= History of broadcasting in Australia =

Aspect of the history of Australia

The history of broadcasting in Australia has been shaped for over a century by the problem of communication across long distances, coupled with a strong base in a wealthy society with a deep taste for aural communications in a silent landscape. Australia developed its own system, through its own engineers, manufacturers, retailers, newspapers, entertainment services, and news agencies. The government set up the first radio system, and business interests marginalized the hobbyists and amateurs. The Australian Labor Party was especially interested in radio because it allowed them to bypass the newspapers, which were mostly controlled by the opposition. Both parties agreed on the need for a national system, and in 1932 set up the Australian Broadcasting Commission, as a government agency that was largely separate from political interference.

The first commercial broadcasters, originally known as "B" class stations were on the air as early as 1925. Many were sponsored by newspapers in Australia, by theatrical interests, by amateur radio enthusiasts and radio retailers, and by retailers generally. Almost all Australians were within reach of a station by the 1930s, and the number of stations remained relatively stable through the post-war era. However, in the 1970s, the Labor government under Prime Minister Gough Whitlam commenced a broadcasting renaissance so that by the 1990s there were 50 different radio services available for groups based on tastes, languages, religion, or geography. The broadcasting system was largely deregulated in 1992, except that there were limits on foreign ownership and on monopolistic control. By 2000, 99 percent of Australians owned at least one television set, and averaged 20 hours a week watching it.

== Regulatory chronology ==
=== 1890s ===
==== Pre-federation ====
Prior to Australian federation, the regulatory framework was vested in the individual colonies and the province of South Australia. Wireless was closely aligned with the important postal and telegraphy functions and each state had its own post and telegraph department, which were merged into the Postmaster-General's Department (PMG) upon federation. Schedule 1 of the Post and Telegraph Act 1901 lists numerous State acts which were superseded by the new act, the key being:

- New South Wales – "An Act to establish and regulate Electric Telegraphs."
- Victoria – "Post Office Act 1890."
- Queensland – "The Post and Telegraph Act 1891."
- South Australia – "An Act to regulate the construction and management of Electric Telegraphs 1857."
- Western Australia – "The Post and Telegraph Act 1893."
- Tasmania – "The Electric Telegraph Act 1857."

==== Earliest wireless experiments ====
The progressive developments in wireless theory and experimentation by James Maxwell, Heinrich Hertz, Guglielmo Marconi and others were not only described in the professional journals, but captured the public imagination to such an extent that each new success was widely reported in the worldwide press. Australia was no exception when it came to this public fascination. The equipment necessary to duplicate the smaller scale experiments was not difficult to manufacture and similar experiments were soon being undertaken in Australian laboratories and then public demonstrations in all Australian states. The experimenters can be categorised into PMG, Military, Academic and Private Experimenters.

- Post and Telegraph Departments In each Australian colony, the respective Post and Telegraph Departments were actively engaging in wireless telegraphy experiments. The driver was not purely scientific, submarine cables were an expensive technology (both capital and maintenance) to give effect to communication to near-coast islands and across the Bass Strait. Australia's vast open spaces had already proven expensive projects for deployments of telegraph lines. Wireless telegraphy offered the prospect of very substantial cost savings.
- Military Military applications for wireless technology were clear and present. Ships of war were isolated from communication upon departure from ports immediately visual contact was lost. A mobile army force could not rely upon existing land lines and considerable effort was required to temporarily deploy additional lines, which in any event were exposed to enemy attention.
- Academia Australia's leading academic institutions were all following the international developments and had the advantage of bringing together our leading theoreticians and leading technologists.
- Private experimenters Prior to Federation, it is not clear whether formal licensing of private experimenters was required by individual colonies, or if it was whether it was pursued. No individual licences have been reported, while experiments by the PMG and Military would be exempt from licensing, and those by academia usually in co-ordination with the PMG. As always Australian amateur experimenters followed close in their wake, often overlooking the formal need for licensing by the authorities.

===== New South Wales =====
Richard Threlfall The announcement by Hertz in 1888 of his successful experiments in the existence of free electromagnetic waves created a sensation throughout the scientific world. The Hertz' experiments were repeated in the Physics laboratory at the University of Sydney the same year.

Philip Billingsley Walker On 10 August 1899, the Postmaster-General, one or two officers of the department and representatives of the press, were invited to a demonstration of wireless under the supervision of P. B. Walker, Engineer-in-Chief of Telegraphs. The transmitting and receiving aerial wires were suspended on the corners of the roof of the Post Office building with the equipment itself in the laboratory below. The demonstration was entirely a success, though interference was present from adjacent tram lines. Walker stated that he felt there was presently limited commercial application, but nevertheless advised that further experiments would be conducted, with sea trials still to be decided upon. The transmitting was undertaken by Walker and the receiving by Watkin Wynne. All the equipment was manufactured by staff of the Government electrician, principally John Nelson. A 12-inch induction coil was used for transmission and a two-inch coherer for reception. An amount of £150.0.0 was stated to have been reserved for purchase of equipment from the Marconi Telegraph Company, with further experiments to proceed upon receipt. However Walker died in August 1900, and with his passing wireless telegraphy seems to have fallen dormant for many years.

Joseph Patrick Slattery is reported from 1900 as experimenting in wireless telegraphy at St Stanislaus' College, Bathurst with equipment made by himself, but the experiments were considerably extended from late 1903 when professional Marconi equipment arrived from London and were immediately deployed.

===== South Australia and the Northern Territory =====
William Henry Bragg was working on wireless telegraphy as early as 1895, though public lectures and demonstrations focussed on his X-ray research which would later lead to his Nobel Prize. In a hurried visit by Ernest Rutherford, he was reported as working on a Hertzian oscillator. There were many common practical threads to the two technologies and he was ably assisted in the laboratory by Arthur Lionel Rogers who manufactured much of the equipment. On 21 September 1897, Bragg gave the first recorded public demonstration of the working of wireless telegraphy in Australia during a lecture meeting at the University of Adelaide as part of the Public Teachers' Union conference. Bragg departed Adelaide in December 1897, and spent all of 1898 on a 12-month leave of absence, touring Great Britain and Europe and during this time visited Marconi and inspected his wireless facilities. He returned to Adelaide in early March 1899, and already by 13 May 1899, Bragg and his father-in-law Sir Charles Todd were conducting preliminary tests of wireless telegraphy with a transmitter at the Observatory and a receiver on the South Road (about 200 metres). Experiments continued throughout the southern winter of 1899 and the range was progressively extended to Henley Beach. In September the work was extended to two way transmissions with the addition of a second induction coil loaned by James Oddie of Ballarat. It was desired to extend the experiments across a sea path and Todd was interested in connecting Cape Spencer and Althorpe Island, but local costs were considered prohibitive while the charges for patented equipment from the Marconi Company were exorbitant. At the same time Bragg's interests were leaning towards X-rays and practical work in wireless in South Australia was largely dormant for the next decade.

===== Victoria =====
George William Selby took an interest in all aspects of the new science of electricity, both in practical experiments and public education. As early as 1878 he was demonstrating an induction coil (a key component of the future wireless telegraphy) and Geissler tube. In July 1897, in response to reports of Marconi's success, he announced that, he had also been successful in his experiments which had commenced some three years earlier (i.e. 1894). While, it does appear that no great distance was traversed, his experiments are amongst the earliest in Australia. At a time when public interest in wireless was extreme, Selby was balancing his time against his business interest in accountancy and progress with his experiments was slow. In June 1899, Selby approached the Victorian Defence Department for approval to conduct experiments between the coast and a warship. Approval was given and successful tests were achieved between HMVS Cerberus, which was moored in Hobsons Bay, and the naval depot, Williamstown. It is stated that the apparatus used was that made by Selby in 1897. In February 1900, it was reported that Selby was now successfully communicating between Malvern and Brighton, a distance of five miles, but still well behind Jenvey. In February 1901, he auctioned much of his equipment and thereafter there is little record of further experimenting. However his public education activities and commentary continued, including presentation in December 1908 of a major paper on Wireless Telegraphy to the Victorian Institute of Engineers.

James Oddie acquired considerable wealth during the gold rush period in Ballarat, and used much of that wealth in philanthropic pursuits. He was closely involved in the Ballarat School of Mines and taught there for a period. In the late 1890s he was involved in wireless telegraphy experiments, but detailed records appear limited. Famously, while visiting Bragg and Todd in Adelaide, he learned of their need for a second large induction coil and promptly arranged dispatch of his own unit which greatly assisted their more advanced experiments.

Frederick John Clendinnen was a well-known doctor of medicine practising in Melbourne. He was an early adopter of X-ray technology and in June 1896 published a wide variety of photographs displaying his art. While continuing his work in X-rays, he was also an inventor in electrical fields. In September 1897, he applied for a patent for an improved coin-operated public telephone. In September 1897, a lecture and demonstration by Clendinnen of X-rays included brief work on "Tesla's experiments" assumed to be wireless. A similar lecture and demonstration was given at Kew in December 1897. In February 1899, Clendinnen demonstrated his wireless telegraphy equipment to the Deputy Postmaster-General of Victoria and other officers. His experiments diverged from the usual into remote detonation of fuses by wireless, as reported in December 1899. The wireless detonation of fuses appears to have caught the public attention and this feature was again included in a lecture to the Bendigo School of Mines in August 1900 which principally addressed X-rays. It was noted in the lecture that the induction coil had been manufactured by Edward Hope Kirkby of Williamstown. Thereafter, Clendinnen's professional work with the booming X-ray field became his passion. Sadly, like so many of the earliest workers in the field, the frequent exposure of X-rays on his own body took its toll. At age only 55 years, he died in London in November 1913, while attending the World Medical Congress.

Henry Walter Jenvey, in late 1896, in explaining "Telegraphy without Wires" to the press, refers only to the leakage and inductive methods. But soon afterwards, he himself was actively engaged in the electromagnetic method. In 1899 his lectures had been extended to include Marconi's system. The successful experiments by Walker in Sydney in August 1899 prompted Jenvey to reveal that for some weeks he had been exchanging messages between the General Post Office and the Telephone exchange at Willis Street, a distance of a half mile. The first message to grace the airwaves of Melbourne was "Long reign Duffy" referring to the Postmaster-General for Victoria. By 1900 he was reporting that an experimental network of wireless stations had been established at the Observatory, Wilson Hall at the university and the General Post Office. As part of the Congress of the Association for the Advancement of Science, on 12 January 1900, Jenvey presented a lecture on the current state of wireless telegraphy in the world at the Wilson Hall of the University of Melbourne. At the conclusion of the lecture, he then sent a request from his station erected in the hall and received in return the word "Melbourne" from his station in the tower of the General Post Office. Jenvey continued his experiments throughout 1900, with regular stations established at Heidelberg and Doncaster. From April 1901, efforts concentrated on Point Ormond, Port Phillip Bay and a station was established with a 155 ft. pole near the shoreline, to take advantage of the better propagation over salt water. From Point Ormond, communication was soon established with Point Cook, a distance of 10 miles, by means of a kite-borne aerial at the latter location. The timing of this extension of transmission distance for Jenvey's apparatus was sublime. The Duke and Duchess of Cornwall and York were to visit Australia to participate in the celebrations of Federation. Jenvey sought and obtained permission from Senator Drake, the Postmaster-General, to erect a facility at Queenscliff to send greetings to the royal party as they approached Port Phillip Bay. In the first week of May, a large tent was erected on the recreation reserve near the fort and the equipment installed. On Sunday evening 5 May 1901, news was received at Queenscliff that the RMS Ophir was off Split Point and the message of greeting was sent. No reply was received, but it was later confirmed that the message was received by the escorting ships, but the absence of a Naval code precluded a response. While the convoy was in port, Jenvey established contact with Lieutenant Trousdale, R.N., of the warship HMS St George and messages were then regularly exchanged with the Point Ormond station. When most of the convoy departed on 18 May, Jenvey exchanged messages with the St. George on the initial part of her journey. The last message received from the St. George was at a distance of 37 miles, a record for Australia which would stand for some years. He continued his experiments throughout the 1900s, but prioritised the essential work of developing and integrating the telegraphic and telephonic networks of the fledgling Commonwealth.

Henry Lord 1899 Henry Lord, Electrician with the Post & Telegraph Department on 12 September 1899 gave a lecture and demonstration of wireless telegraphy at the Bruce Auction and Jumble Fair. It was reported as follows: "a lecture on Wireless Telegraphy was delivered by Mr Henry Lord, electrician of the Telephone branch, Melbourne. The hall was decorated for the occasion with bunting, and the attendance was very satisfactory. The Rev. Canon Watson presided. The programme was opened by a selection on the Gramaphone [sic], after which the lecturer commenced his discourse. He said wireless telegraphy was not the proper name to give the wonderful discovery of recent years, rather it should be called Hertzean [sic] wave telegraphy, or space telegraphy, because it was absolutely necessary that they should have wires to transmit and receive the messages .... The lecturer at this stage proceeded to give practical illustrations of the working of the discovery by means of instruments placed upon the platform. Sparks were transmitted from one instrument to another without any intervening wires, and a bell on one instrument was rung by the despatch of electrical waves from the other instrument, an exhibition that was received with loud applause. Gramophone selections, and a display of electric light in colored globes followed, after which the musical portion of the programme was proceeded with .... At the conclusion of the programme Mr H. E. Caldecott proposed a comprehensive vote of thanks to Mr Lord, to the performers, and to those who helped to make the Bruce Auction a success."

J. W. Wallace in 1899 was another Postal department figure with a practical interest in wireless telegraphy. The Argus reported on 1 May 1899: "An interesting lecture on the subject of wireless telegraphy was delivered at St Patrick's College on Friday evening (28 April 1899) by Mr J. W. Wallace of the Postal department. The lecturer traced the history of telegraphy from its earliest stages down to Marconi's latest triumph, and at the close of his remarks he explained, in response to inquiries, a number of minor features of interest. Mr Wallace is at present engaged in conducting some private experiments in wireless telegraphy." A very detailed report of the lecture in the Advocate of 6 May makes clear Wallace's deep knowledge of the subject.

Edward Hope Kirkby was a jeweler watchmaker in Williamstown who eventually became a manufacturing electrician making systems of fire protection, in 1908 he invented and patented the first automatic sprinkler alarm. He is first recorded as experimenting with X-ray in September 1896. He is reported as experimenting with the medical staff at Williamstown Hospital later that year. In 1900 Dr Clenndinnen was party to demonstrating X-ray at Bendigo School of mines using a Kirkby manufactured X-ray coil, said by him that it was an excellent one. Kirkby eventually moved to Sydney in 1907 where he set up business manufacturing X-ray apparatus and consulting with the medical profession He was first recorded practically demonstrating wireless telegraphy along with X-ray in 1899 He was demonstrating experiments in X-ray and wireless at the Federal Exhibition and Palace of Amusements in 1903 In 1905 on the passing of the wireless telegraphy act he was being interviewed as an expert on the subject of wireless telegraphy as the paper did not trust the PMG Department to adequately understand its implications Wormalds Bros manufacturers of fire protection equipment were getting rich at his expense and he dissolved his partnership with them. He was looking for a place to manufacture his apparatus. He was friends with a Catholic priest, Father Archibald Shaw. He and his superior, Father Guis, built a factory for Kirkby on their land at the procure where Kirkby began manufacturing his fire systems of fire protection. The procure was always short of money and Shaw asked Kirkby to make wireless for him. He did and they became very successful forming a company the Maritime Wireless Company of Australasia.

Francis West Chambers was a professional colleague of Jenvey (government electrician, public works department) and conducted experiments in wireless telegraphy during 1900, both independently and in conjunction with him. At a meeting of the Australian Natives Association on 16 May 1901, he presented a lecture on wireless telegraphy wherein he announced that he had been experimenting in the science for some time. Further that he had been regularly successful in communicating between his residence Mount Eagle, Heidelberg and the Doncaster tower, a distance of 4.75 miles. It was to Chambers that Jenvey telegraphed news of a major development in his experimenting on 17 November 1900 and remarkably that telegraph survived and endures. Museums Victoria

William Charles Kernot was Professor of Engineering at the University of Melbourne as is reported conducting experiments in wireless circa 1900.

E. F. J. Love gave a lecturette on the subject of "wireless, or more properly space telegraphy" on 24 March 1899 at the University of Melbourne as part of the university Conversazione.

===== Queensland =====
In May 1898, a sole report states that Colonel Howel Gunter, commandant of the Queensland defence forces instructed the conduct of wireless telegraphy experiments at Lytton, to ascertain whether the technique could be utilised for signalling purposes at the forthcoming annual Easter camp. The experiments trialed both the conductive and Hertz wave methods and were reported successful in both instances, however, the conductive method was considered more suitable for field use due to utilisation of less-skilled men. It does seem likely that immediate supervision of the experiments was with John Hesketh as he definitely supervised the Phonopore telegraphy experiments in June 1898, but this remains to be established.

John Hesketh 1898

Edward Gustavus Campbell Barton was prominent in Queensland in early electric lighting projects, including first electric lighting of the Queensland Assembly. He was appointed as Queensland Government Electrical Engineer in 1886. But by March 1888 he had left the public service and formed a partnership with Mr C. F. White as Barton, White and Co. Barton had a close association with the Technical College and in a private capacity ran courses with lectures which paralleled the rapid advances in all matters electrical at the time. In July 1891 he gave a lecture at the School of Arts on the topic of induction coils, a key component of wireless and X-ray technology. In April 1899 he gave a comprehensively reported lecture on Wireless Telegraphy at the Technical College and concluded with a demonstration of "Marconi apparatus" including both an induction coil and a Branly detector. In mid-1901, Barton gave an entire series of lectures at the Technical College on the subject of Telegraphy and in May 1901 the lecture was devoted to wireless telegraphy, again concluding with a demonstration of his equipment. It was stated that the system had been imported and consisted of a Righi oscillator, induction coil and Branly coherer. A further series of lectures was conducted in 1902, including one in March 1902 on the subject "Wireless Telegraphy and its Position in Regard to Submarine Cables". The descriptions of the demonstration tend to indicate that the wireless apparatus had not been further developed. Indeed, though Barton's own career continue to ascend, there is little further reference to wireless activities. However, amongst his young students was John Graeme Balsillie who went on to become the inventor of the Balsillie system of wireless telegraphy which was used to deploy the majority of Australia's coastal radio network in the early 1910s.

William Rooke Creswell 1901

===== Tasmania =====
Thomas Edward Self 1898 At the monthly meeting of the Royal Society of Tasmania on the evening of 11 July 1898 in the Art Gallery, Argyle Street, Hobart, Thomas Edward Self read a paper on "Telegraphy without wires", and "made some interesting experiments in the presence of the audience. There were two transmitters, one before the lecturer and the other entirely outside the room. It was shown by the continual ringing of a bell in the apparatus in front of the lecturer that there was continual connection between the two, though the connection was invisible." At a lecture at the Technical School on the evening of 8 August 1898, Thomas Self (instructor at the school) again presented his work on electricity and demonstrated the topic with particular reference to "telegraphy without wires."

Royal Visit Hobart 1901. William Philpot Hallam, Frederick William Medhurst and Frank Prosser Bowden all participated in a successful wireless telegraphy experiment to communicate with the ships of the Royal Party as they arrived at Hobart. None of the group had prior experience in wireless and it appears that Hallam, the leader, was drafted into the exercise. In a newspaper report of 2 July 1901; "The first quickening throb of excitement over the Royal visit pulsated early on Tuesday morning, when a couple of guns, fired from the Queen's Battery, conveyed the lively information that the Ophir had been sighted at 7.30 a.m. in Storm Bay, attended by the St George and the Juno. When the three vessels were coming up the river, a communication, by means of wireless telegraphy, was successfully achieved between One Tree Point and the St George, just as the latter rounded a headland above Brown's River. A wireless telegraphy apparatus was fixed on an 80ft. pole near One Tree Point Lighthouse, and as the St George steamed along about three miles off, Lieut. Trowsdale, from the ship, opened the conversation, with. "Good morning", and then followed this message to the St George, telephoned to Mr. Hallam, the chief operator (who had prepared and affixed the apparatus), to forward: "Tasmania greets the Royal yacht Ophir and her consorts", which was at once acknowledged, and some other messages followed, whilst later in the day wireless communication was established between the St George, lying in the harbour, and the Post Office, by means of an apparatus placed on a pole in the Post Office yard."

===== Western Australia =====
George Phillip Stevens Western Australia, was slow to engage in wireless telegraphy experiments, but there was public outcry in response to a number of marine disasters on the Western Australian coast in 1898. A need for communication between the Rottnest Island lighthouse and Fremantle Port (16 miles) was identified. In January 1899, W. J. Hancock (Government electrician) suggested that wireless telegraphy could be employed for the task at much lower cost than submarine cable and noted that greater distances had already been achieved in England. In May 1899, George Phillip Stevens (Manager and Electrician, General Post-office) announced that preliminary tests had just been completed in a workshop environment and provided a comprehensive description of the equipment which was described as simple. Two further marine disasters of the Western Australian coast in July 1899 forced the Government to act immediately and an order for submarine cables was placed.

Nevertheless, wireless experiments continued. Various difficulties were encountered in extending transmission distance, but in September 1899, Stevens announced that reliable transmissions were now being achieved across 5 rooms in the basement of the Telegraph Office. It was further announced that attempts would now be made between the General Post Office, Perth and the Windsor Hotel, South Perth (about 1 mile). In October 1899, successful tests were conducted between the Perth Yacht Club and a police launch, out to a distance of 3/4 mile. Stevens was limited by local workshop facilities and his coherer was not able to be evacuated, resulting in loss of sensitivity. He recommended acquisition of Marconi apparatus, but this in turn led to excessive establishment costs and experiments ceased at this point. The submarine cable between Rottnest Island and the mainland was officially opened in March 1900. Stevens continued to promote wireless telegraphy through public education activities, including practical demonstrations. As part of the Federal Government proposals in 1906, Stevens made enquiries of the Fremantle Harbour Trust as to their attitude to establishment of a station on Rottnest Island, which was supported.

F McCormick There is a sole report of limited wireless telegraphy experiments at Coolgardie in June 1899. It is stated that the experiments had initially been confused by building wiring induction, but that had now been overcome and Hertzian waves were now being received at a distance of a few feet. McCormick was working with Messrs. Davey and Griffiths in his experiments.

==== Marconi patents asserted ====
In the late 1890s the various patents held by Marconi and related companies in the United Kingdom and the Americas, were separately asserted in each of the Australian colonies.

=== 1900s ===
==== Federation ====
On 1 January 1901, when the Australian colonies and the province of South Australia joined to form a new nation, the Constitution of the Commonwealth of Australia gave federal governments power to make laws with respect to specifically defined areas (section 51). In particular, paragraph 51(v) explicitly identified "postal, telegraphic, telephonic, and other like services". While there was no stated specific power in respect of the press, it was considered that such power fell within the scope of paragraph 51(i) "trade and commerce with other countries and among the states", among others.

==== Post and Telegraph Act 1901 ====
The generic powers under section 51(v) were enunciated in detail in the Post and Telegraph Act 1901, but the act only received royal assent 16 November 1901 and commenced 1 December 1901. The act delegated those powers to the newly established Postmaster-General's Department ("PMG"). This Act included two key definitions: (1) "Telegraphic" includes telephonic and (2) "Telegraph" or "telegraph line" means a wire or cable used for telegraphic or telephonic communication including any casing coating tube tunnel or pipe enclosing the same and any posts masts or piers supporting the same and any apparatus connected therewith or any apparatus for transmitting messages or other communications by means of electricity.

The Act was silent in respect of the relatively new science of wireless telegraphy, which had not yet assumed commercial proportions but likely fell within the scope of "telegraphic". As wireless telegraphy began to display not only commercial but also defence promise, any possible uncertainty of interpretation was removed by a specific act the Wireless Telegraph Act 1905, which placed these powers under PMG. The possible uncertainty had in no way limited the PMG's interest and participation in the new technology before 1905.

Fessenden's tentative initial experiments with wireless telephony would only commence in the following year, but it too clearly fell within scope of both the Post and Telegraph Act 1901 and the Wireless Telegraphy Act 1905. Nevertheless, once wireless telephony began to shine bright on the commercial and defence horizons, this technology too was deemed to warrant explicit provision and some 14 years later, the Wireless Telegraphy Act 1919 simply amended the definition of wireless telegraphy to include wireless telephony.

==== Continuing wireless experiments ====
Australian radio hams can be traced to the early 1900s. The 1905 Wireless Telegraphy Act while acknowledging the existence of wireless telegraphy, brought all broadcasting matters in Australia under the control of the Federal Government. In 1906, the first official Morse code transmission in Australia was conducted by the Marconi Company between Queenscliff, Victoria and Devonport, Tasmania. However, some sources claim that there were transmissions in Australia as early as 1897 – these were either conducted solely by Professor William Henry Bragg of the University of Adelaide or by Prof. Bragg in conjunction with G.W. Selby of Melbourne.

===== New South Wales =====
Joseph Patrick Slattery of St Stanislaus' College, Bathurst, Bathurst had a keen interest in wireless telegraphy and was conducting experiments at the college as early as 1900 and these experiments continued for more than a decade. He was ably supported in these experiments by several of the staff at the college, with at least the President, Maurice Joseph O'Reilly being especially skilled in the field.

John P. King, of the New South Wales Postmaster-General's Department, in 1904 is reported assisting Slattery at St Stanislaus' College in his experiments as well as conducting his own private experiments.

George Augustine Taylor was a prolific experimenter. In October 1909, he was the driving force behind the Great Exhibition of Building and Engineering, conducted at Prince Alfred Park, Sydney. The exhibition included displays and demonstrations of wireless telegraphy.

Charles Dansie Maclurcan and Cyril Lane of the Sydney electrical engineering firm Maclurcan and Lane were granted an experimental licence in 1909 and soon commenced wireless telegraphy transmissions from the rooftop of the Wentworth Hotel (owned by Maclurcan's mother). Maclurcan was to become famous in the broadcasting world in the 1920s when he transmitted broadcasting programmes from his experimental station with callsign 2CM.

===== Victoria =====
E. J. C. Wraith is reported at an early age in November 1896, for displays of electrical appliances at the Bendigo Juvenile Industrial Exhibition, where he was awarded a gold and a silver medal. From 1898 to 1903 he was a student at the Bendigo School of Mines and employed by the Victorian Railways Department as an engine driver. He displayed interest in electrical science and was encouraged in this by school staff and eventually he was constructing his own wireless telegraphy equipment, being the first to do so in the Bendigo district. In January 1902 he is reported as conducting successful experiments with his self-made equipment of the Marconi type, set up in the Bendigo town hall. Messages were sent from one end of the hall to the other, in the presence of G. V. Allen, the secretary of the Bendigo jubilee exhibition. A public demonstration of wireless was subsequently given at the exhibition in March 1902, with the Registrar of the school Captain G. Alec. Thomson assisting. In June 1902, the roles were reversed with Thomson lecturing and Wraith demonstrating both wireless and X-rays technology. Little of Wraith is heard subsequently, he does not appear in early lists of licensed wireless experimenters. In 1916 he filed an application for a patent for Improvements relating to apparatus for inducing air drifts or blasts.

Horace Greeley Robinson, also known as Hyman Rabinowitz, conducted a lecture and exhibition of wireless telegraphy at Glen's Concert Hall, Collins St., Melbourne in August and September 1906. in his stated role as Marconi representative in Australia was providing, upon request, demonstrations of Marconi wireless telegraphy equipment at the premises of the company Munroe and Munroe, 318 Collins St., Melbourne during August and September 1906. Similar lectures and demonstrations were also given at Centenary Hall, York St., Sydney. However, it emerged that the demonstrations had been made to lure investors into purchase of shares in the Marconi company. Large sums were paid but few investors ever saw their shares. Robinson / Rabinowitz was arrested in New York and charged with larceny under false pretences in relation the shares. While it was little publicised at the time, Robinson / Rabinowitz was the recipient of the first experimental licence issued by the department and was no doubt utilised by him to give an air of legitimacy to his scam.

Telefunken proposals to link Victoria, Sydney, New Zealand, Lord Howe Island, Norfolk Island – May 1905

Marconi temporary facility Queenscliff and Devonport across the Bass Strait – 1905–1906

Henry Sutton was an inventor potentially responsible for the telephone, the lightbulb, and front wheel drive automobiles. From 1906 he extended his investigations into the field of wireless telegraphy and even wireless telephony. When the Postmaster-General's Department pointed out the need for a licence for these activities, he circumvented the problem by involving the Defence Department.

"Charles Hughes" is reported as having given a lecture with demonstrations on the subject of wireless telegraphy to the Geelong Lodge of the Manchester Unity Oddfellows in August 1909. He was assisted by T. G. Madden. Hughes is assumed to be the same as C. S. C. Hughes of East Melbourne who appears in the 1914 Wireless Institute of Victoria list of current experimental licences, with callsign XJDU.

Victor Charles John Nightingall was a scientist and prolific inventor. He was an early pioneer of X-rays Victoria, undertook experiments with radioactive irradiation of seeds and soils and invented powerful electromagnets. In a letter to the editor of The Age 12 August 1909 in response to the likely loss of the Waratah, states that he has been experimenting with a new system of wireless telegraphy, nearing completion, with input by typewriter rather than morse key. He states that the system will eliminate the need for a skilled wireless operator with very substantial savings. That announcement was silently received, but subsequently a report in February 1910 from Adelaide that Carnotite, a radioactive ore from the Radium Hill mine was being used by Nightingall with great effect (presumed a new form of contact detector) became national news. These experiments led to detailed scrutiny of the obstacles placed in the way of licensing of wireless experimenters, and eventually to the opening of the flood gates for private experimentation. Nightingall's wireless telegraphy system is fully described and beautifully illustrated in The Leader of 12 March 1910. Nightingall is recorded as licensed with callsign XKK in the 1914 WIV list of experimenters. His stature in the wireless industry was reflected in his election as first president of the reformed Wireless Institute of Victoria in 1919.

===== Queensland =====
Hesketh / PMG tests between South Brisbane (Naval Stores) and Moreton Island (Tangalooma) 1903

In November 1903, John Hesketh was both Queensland Government Electrical Engineer and President of the Queensland Electrical Association (both positions having been previously held by Edward Barton). As part of the University Extension Lecture program, Hesketh gave a lecture on the subjects of "Wireless Telegraphy" and "Telephony". At the conclusion of the lecture a demonstration of Marconi wireless apparatus was provided using the equipment of the Naval Defence Force, kindly lent by Captain Creswell.

Marconi proposals for Torres Strait islands – April 1904

===== South Australia =====
Edward Hope Kirkby is reported in August 1907 as demonstrating a complete wireless telegraphy apparatus to a journalist of the Adelaide Advertiser, at the US depot, Gawler Place, Adelaide. The set was said to be of the kind used by the large Liverpool-America mail boats. Kirkby was also active his wireless experiments in Victoria in the 1890s and New South Wales 1900s

===== Western Australia =====
Lloyd's proposal for Rottnest Island 1903

Frederick Soddy's services were announced in April 1904 as having been secured by the University Extension committee (of the University of Adelaide) for a series of popular lectures on the subject of radioactivity, X-rays and wireless telegraphy. Soddy had already won fame in his co-discovery (with Rutherford) of the transmutation of elements, though his many other discoveries and award of Nobel Prize lay in the future. The committee was aware that they were fortunate in having such a notable scientist in their midst and arranged a comprehensive program both for Perth and several surrounding country centres. Soddy had concluded his tenure at the University College, London and was about to take up his newly created position as lecturer in physical chemistry and radioactivity at Glasgow University. Soddy arrived at Fremantle 14 June 1904 on board RMS Australia. In an interesting twist, this vessel was wrecked at Point Nepean less than a week later (fortunately with no loss of life). The lectures were entitled "Radium and Modern Views on Electricity and Matter". The planned schedule of lectures was varied in number and timing through the course of the tour, but in the end included 7 in Perth (one of which was a repeat), 3 in Fremantle, 2 in Kalgoorlie and 1 each in Coolgardie, Northam, York, Albany and Bunbury.

His first Perth lecture was on 20 June 1904 at St George's Hall, Perth resulted in an attendance of 800, with some 300 having to be turned away. That first lecture included demonstration of a large induction coil for the production of "high frequency currents", but there was no reference to either a Hertzian coil detector or a Branly coherer, so it can not be conclusively said that wireless was covered. The lecture was repeated on 23 June at Queen's Hall, Perth (then the largest capacity hall in the State) to try to accommodate the many who had not been able to be granted entry previously. This venue was also used for all the remaining Perth lectures. The "second" lecture was given on 25 June and mainly addressed fundamentals of physical chemistry and electricity, but concluded with a brief treatment of wireless: "Mr. Soddy concluded with an analogous treatment of wireless telegraphy. He gave several examples of electrical resonance, and also an interesting experiment with miniature wireless telegraphy apparatus." It was his third lecture which was of greatest interest in the history of wireless, being entirely devoted to "Wireless Telegraphy". A comprehensive survey was provided of the theoretical studies of Maxwell, the practical experiments of Herz and the realisation of the technology by Marconi. The demonstrations were properly detailed by solely one journalist versed in the technology: "The radiator which he had on the platform gave a wave a hundred feet long, the hall was about a wave length ... An experiment was then shown in which a wave from the radiator on the platform rang a bell in the back gallery of the hall ... He had on the table a receiving set of instruments as utilised in the Lodge-Muirhead system of wireless telegraphy, and with these he had seen messages sent over a distance of 45 miles. Ordinary telegraph instruments could be adapted to this system. The coherer was of a special type. A steel disc revolved in a pool of mercury covered with a film of oil. In ordinary circumstances the oil insulated the disc from the mercury. A wave coming along broke down the insulation, the two metals cohered and a signal passed through the apparatus into the recorder". The fourth lecture was held on 19 July and addressed the discharge of electricity through rarefied gases (a repeat of a Fremantle lecture). The fifth lecture was delivered 22 July and was characterised by the theft of one of the spinthariscopes being circulated amongst the audience. The sixth and final lecture on 23 July addressed primarily geophysical and astronomical matters.

The first lecture at Fremantle was given on 21 June at Victoria Hall, which venue was also utilised for subsequent lectures. A second lecture was delivered 27 June. The third lecture on 30 June concluded the series at Fremantle. Further lectures were conducted in each of Kalgoorlie (Her Majesty's Theatre, 5 July, 8 July), Coolgardie (Technical School, 7 July), Northam (Town Hall, 12 July), York (Mechanics' Institute, 13 July), Albany (Town Hall, 15 July) and Bunbury (Masonic Hall, 20 July). It is not clear whether the shorter lectures in the country areas addressed wireless telegraphy other than in passing, the focus being upon Radium and radio-activity and it may be that only the instruments were displayed. Soddy's visit to Western Australia caused a significant burst of interest in scientific education in the state and perhaps a trigger for the establishment of its first university The University of Western Australia in 1911. He is recorded as strongly advocating the establishment of a university at the conclusion of his tour. Soddy departed on 27 July aboard the RMS Moldavia for Sydney and thence to North America and Great Britain.

Perth Technical School at its annual demonstration 9 December 1904 included a note: "A very popular resort with visitors was the electrical classrooms, in which interesting demonstrations were given. The apparatus includes some of the instruments used by Mr Soddy in his recent "Radium" lectures, notably an apparatus for showing high frequency currents." The school's annual report for 1904 reveals incidentally further detail of the Soddy instruments: "Mathematical and Physical Department. During this year the work of this department has largely increased with the influx of students, but Mr. Allen and his assistant, Mr. Clucas, have proved equal to the demands made upon them. The appointment of a second assistant will enable important developments to be made. Indents have just been despatched for further valuable apparatus, and soon this school will be fully equipped for the training of electrical and other engineers. One very important gain to this department last year was the acquisition by purchase of most of the apparatus used by Mr. Soddy in his university extension course on radium." It seems unlikely that the Lodge-Muirhead equipment was included in the acquisition, given that that group also fiercely protected its patents, but equally the core equipment would have been easily leveraged into wireless equipment by the lecturers and students of the school.

Masters A. Farrant and Stuart Boots gave a "novel and entertaining" lecture entitled "Practical Electrical Phenomena," in June 1906 at St Barnabas' Hall, Leederville in the presence of a large audience. The lecturers, who had only recently left school, illustrated their discourse with the aid of appliances manufactured by themselves. Exhibitions were given of wireless telegraphy, X-rays, and other marvels of electricity.

===== Tasmania =====
Lloyd's proposal for Bass Strait 1901

AWA proposal for Bass Strait 1901–1903

Visit of Japanese training squadron 1903 to Hobart was a matter of great public anticipation. The Mercury of 29 May 1903 announced that William Philpot Hallam would be conducting further wireless telegraphy experiments, attempting to communicate with the warships off Cape Pillar with equipment set up at the Shot tower. The warships however arrived a little earlier than expected and messages were only briefly intercepted before the progress of the vessels up the river resulted in hills along the propagation path and consequent signal attenuation.

Hobart Conversazione 1904 A Scientific Conversazione was held in Hobart in September 1904. Displays included wireless telegraphy equipment under the charge of W. P. Hallam. The Mercury of 19 September reported: "The committee room will be in charge of Messrs. Robert Henry, W. P. Hallam, and Mr. Todd. This room will be fitted up with electrical appliances, including the wireless telegraphy, which will be explained and at work during each evening." A later report makes it clear that the wireless telegraphy equipment was operated by W. P. Hallam, Frederick William Medhurst and C. Hamilton. It was also later revealed that the equipment displayed was the same as that utilised for the Royal Visit to Hobart in 1901. W. P. Hallam was subsequently granted a wireless experimenter's licence and appears in the 1914 WIV list with callsign XZH. Medhurst also appears in that list with callsign XZD, after WWII he was licensed as 7AH. Medhurst was never required to pass an AOCP examination, no doubt due to his employment and involvement in the field.

Mt Nelson to Tasman Island 1906. 3/4 February 1906, the prodigious William Philpot Hallam conducted a number of successful experiments using home-made equipment and assisted by his team of co-workers at the Telegraph Office of the Hobart GPO. The report was as follows: "On Saturday and Sunday Mr W. P. Hallam, of the Telegraph Department at Hobart Post-office, conducted some interesting experiments in wireless telegraphy, between Mt. Nelson signal station and Tasman Island, also between that station and a steamer proceeding down the river. The SS Moonah left Hobart in the afternoon on Saturday equipped with a wireless receiving apparatus, and signals were sent from Mt Nelson, and received on board up to the time the steamer passed out of the river. The next day Mr Hallam's assistant landed from the SS Moonah at Tasman Island, fixed up a receiving circuit there, and he received signals sent by Mr Hallam from Mt Nelson, from 9 a.m. till 11.50 p.m.; but not having a transmitting instrument the assistant could not reply. The receiving indicator was one of Mr Hallam's own design. He states that the trial was very satisfactory as far as it went, and it was only a matter of detail to put wireless telegraphy into regular use between those two places. The main object of the test was in connection with the desire of the Marine Board to establish wireless telegraphy between Mt Nelson and the lighthouses, and it is evident that this may be done without difficulty, being simply a question of cost."

==== Merchant shipping ====
While Australia's deployment of a network of coastal wireless stations was lost for a decade in a regulatory policy impasse, individual ships in international service were often already equipped for wireless communication. Facilities were used for reception of weather information by the high power long wave transmitters elsewhere in the world. When more than one such ship was in or close to an Australian port, the "sparkies" communicated amongst themselves.

Many developed countries were contemplating compulsory installation of wireless telegraphy on larger vessels for safety of life reasons. Even Australia which was unable to reach a landing on coastal stations on her own shores, in awarding the England-Australia mail contract for 1909 to Peninsular and Orient Co. made it a requirement that all vessels deployed in the mail service be equipped with wireless.

===== P & O Line =====
RMS Mantua (Callsign: MME) was custom built for the mail contract and was launched in April 1909. She was the 8th of the Caird & Co M-class vessels and initial fitout included Marconi wireless. Her first Australian port of call was Fremantle, arriving 6 July 1909 and a local reporter of the Perth Daily News gave comprehensive background on the wireless equipment: "Messages through space; M+aphy installed on RMS Mantua a great success; The P. and O. RMS Mantua, the first English mail boat travelling to Australia carrying the Marconi wireless telegraph, arrived at Fremantle this morning, and great public interest was taken in the skeleton looking apparatus placed on both mast heads. The particular instrument carried on the Mantua has a range of 250 miles, and in this respect differs greatly from the huge liners which cross the Atlantic, but it is considered that this range will more than suffice should emergencies arise during the vessel's progress through the Pacific and Indian Oceans. On the Atlantic liners again two operators are carried, but so far the Mantua has hardly found enough employment for one telegraphist. During the voyage out the Mantua's operator, who is one of Marconi's skilled young men, flashed out messages each day in the hope of gaining connection with some other instrument over the vast expanse of water. When the Mantua emerged from the Red Sea, the first vessels she greeted a la Marconi were two Japanese merchant vessels, which, though scores of miles out of sight, returned the felicitous greetings of the Britisher. Then a prowling English man-o'-war skirting round the shallows of the Seychelles Islands, snapped back a hearty business-like message. During the whole of the journey from Tilbury to Port Said people were sending messages ashore to their friends. It was a novelty, and although costing about 1s. a word to dispatch, with a minimum charge of 6s. 6d., the luxury was largely availed of. The Morea and Malwa, sister ships to the Mantua, are also fitted up with wireless telegraph apparatus." She arrived at Hobson's Bay, Melbourne on 12 July 1909 and it was reported that "The steamer is fitted with the Marconi system of wireless telegraphy, and during the passage out other vessels and people on shore were freely communicated with. Captain F. W. Vibert, who is a well-known visitor to Hobson's Bay, has command of the Mantua." Upon arrival in Sydney, the wireless officer A. F. Goodliffe was interviewed and reported on the problems with obtaining acknowledgement of transmissions with many naval vessels due to protocols in place. But noted that approaching Sydney, communication had been established with HMS Pyramus.

RMS Malwa 1909 (Callsign: MMD)

RMS Morea (Callsign: MMF) though having been launched without wireless telegraphy, was subsequently retrofitted with the necessary equipment. Upon her arrival in Fremantle 18 August 1909, was reported now to be carrying wireless, further that she had been communicating near Cocos Island with RMS Mantua.

RMS China (Callsign: MMU) On 27 April 1910 it was reported: "The P. and O. Company's RMS China, from London, arrived at Fremantle yesterday morning. The China has recently undergone extensive alterations, and is fitted with a wireless plant."

===== Orient Line =====
Orient Line shared the Australian Government contract for the Great Britain-Australia mail with the P&O Line. Each company had a vessel sailing from England to Australia every two weeks, resulting in a weekly service of fast mail ships. Five ships were launched in early 1909 and maiden voyages commenced mid-1909. The ships were the RMS Orsova, RMS Osterley, RMS Otway, ...

RMS Orsova (Callsign: MOF) was an ocean liner owned by the Orient Steam Navigation Company. She was built by John Brown & Company at Clydebank, Scotland, in 1909 to operate a passenger and mail service between London and Australia (via Suez Canal). The Orient Line and P&O Line shared the mail contract for Britain-Australia. Her maiden voyage was 25 June 1909. It was reported in January 1909 that the ship would be "fitted with wireless telegraphy, and with all modern appliances for securing the safety and comfort of passengers." Immediately prior to her first arrival at Fremantle on 29 July 1909, the wireless facilities were described: "On top of the charthouse is the standard compass and observation platform. Aft of the forward funnel casing, is situated the Marconi house, in which the wireless telegraph apparatus is fitted, and accommodation is provided in same for the operators."

RMS Osterley (Callsign: MOY) was an ocean liner owned by the Orient Steam Navigation Company. She was built by the London and Glasgow Shipbuilding Company and launched 27 January 1909. Despite reports that she was fitted initially with wireless telegraphy, this was not the case, the owners stating that they were waiting for Australian coastal stations to be erected. Finally, upon arrival at Fremantle 6 September 1910 it was reported: "Since the last visit of the Orient liner Osterley to Australia, she has been installed with the Marconi system of wireless telegraphy. On the present voyage out from England the ship was in touch with Poldhu (Cornwall) up to within 24 hours of arrival at Port Said, the world's latest telegrams being received daily, and a copy posted in all classes for the passengers' information."

RMS Otway (Callsign: MOH) At the time of launch, the Otway was stated to be being fitted for wireless telegraphy equipment. Her sister ship the RMS Otranto had actually been so fitted at time of commissioning and there was an expectation that the Otway would likewise. But when the Otway arrived in Melbourne 1 August 1909, it was reported: "Apparently the Orient S.N. Co. is in no hurry to equip all its liners with "wireless" until the establishment of Australian shore stations admits of practical use being made of the system between sea and land. In view, however, of the fact that the Otranto was installed with "wireless" before she left London on her present visit to the Commonwealth, it was generally anticipated that the other liners of the fleet would be similarly fitted in turn before their departure for Australia. This expectation, however, is not being fulfilled, as the Otway, which arrived at Port Melbourne yesterday morning, having left London a fortnight later than the Otranto, is still without a "wireless" apparatus. So far, therefore, the Otranto is the only vessel of the "Orient" line with this invaluable system installed. The Otway berthed alongside the Port Melbourne Railway Pier early yesterday morning, having experienced a quiet and enjoyable trip from London via the usual stages. The passengers comprised about 90 in the saloon and 480 in the third class, all of whom were apparently well pleased with their sojourn on board the fine liner. She leaves for Sydney to-day."

RMS Otranto (Callsign: MOD) Unlike other ships of the Orient line, the RMS Otranto was actually fitted with wireless telegraphy equipment at the time of its commissioning, following its launch 27 March 1909. The Otranto made free use of wireless on her voyage to Australia, establishing communication with shore stations and liners en route. During the maiden voyage of the Otranto, wireless exchanges passed between the liner and the Poldhu station, at Cornwall, England until at a distance of 1,500 miles further contact became impossible. It was noted that items of news received from the land by wireless were greatly appreciated by the Otranto's passengers.

RMS Orvieto 1910 (Callsign: MOJ)

===== Union Line =====
RMS Makura (Callsign: MKU) was a ship of the Union Steam Ship Co of NZ which had the mail contract between Australia and Canada. Being fitted with wireless telegraphy equipment was a major marketing advantage. In December 1909 upon arrival in Sydney it was reported: "Since her last visit to Sydney the RMS Makura, of the Canadian-Australian mail line, has been fitted with a powerful wireless telegraphic apparatus, and on the voyage from Vancouver to Sydney, completed yesterday, many experiments of a highly successful character were carried out. The installation was made at Vancouver, and the apparatus extends from the mainmast to the foremast. The best record established in the daytime was 800 miles, while at night-time communication was carried on at much greater distances — up to nearly 2000 miles. It is claimed that under exceptionally favourable conditions it will be possible for the Makura to despatch messages over a distance of nearly 3000 miles. The wireless system of the Makura is said to be the most complete yet installed in any merchant vessel employed in the Pacific Ocean. The Makura was never out of communication with land during the whole of the passage from Vancouver to Honolulu, and the "wireless" station at Nome in Alaska was spoken from a distance of 1100 miles. On an average about 20 messages were despatched for passengers nightly on the run from Vancouver to Honolulu, and "press" messages were received when 1500 miles from Honolulu containing the news of the world. When two days out from Vancouver the Makura picked up the Lurline, then lying to the westward of Honolulu, 1900 miles away, and five days later the two vessels met at the entrance to Honolulu. The Makura after leaving Honolulu remained in communication with that port for five days, and then the mail steamer was out of touch with land until Tuesday night last. All the way from Suva in Fiji the Makura made repeated attempts every night to pick up vessels on the Australian coast, but it was not until Tuesday evening, when steaming down this coast, that she received a reply, and that came from the P. and O. Company's RMS Morea in Neutral Bay."

RMS Marama (Callsign: MKM)was a ship of the Union Steam Ship Co of NZ. In August 1910, in Sydney it was reported: "The Canadian-Australian RMS Marama arrived from Vancouver, via Victoria, Honolulu, Fanning Island, Suva and Brisbane, at 3.40 yesterday afternoon (9 August). She left Vancouver at noon on July 15, and Victoria the following morning. Fine weather and smooth sea were experienced to Honolulu which port was reached on the morning of July 23. Leaving again in the afternoon of the same day, she called at Fanning Island on 26th, and reached Suva at midday on 2nd inst. Between Honolulu and Fanning strong winds and squalls were experienced; thence fine weather to Suva. She departed from Suva at 2.30 a.m. on the 3rd, and experienced fine weather to Brisbane, which port was reached at 3.30 p.m. on 7th. She left again at 4 a.m. on 8th, and experienced moderate sea with occasional rain squalls on passage to Sydney. While at Vancouver the Marama was installed with wireless telegraphy by the United Wireless Telegraph Company and some very satisfactory results were obtained on the passage."

===== NDL Line =====
SS Bremen (Callsign: DBR) later renamed Constantinople and then King Alexander, was a German Barbarossa-class ocean liner commissioned in 1897 by Norddeutscher Lloyd. The SS Bremen was built by F. Schichau of Danzig for the Norddeutscher-Lloyd line. She started her maiden voyage on 5 June 1897 and was sadly most notable for passing through the debris field on 20 April 1912 left by the sinking of the RMS Titanic. On 21 November 1907 it was reported: "The advantage of wireless telegraphy was again demonstrated yesterday, when the N.D.L. steamer Bremen, coming up the coast, communicated with HMS Encounter at Garden Island by means of the "wireless," requesting the commander to convey to the agents of the Norddeutscher Lloyd, Messrs. Lohmann and Co., the fact that the German mail steamer would reach Sydney Harbor at about 5 o'clock. The message was promptly delivered, thus facilitating in a marked degree the arrangements for landing the passengers. The present instance is the first on record of the use of wireless telegraphy by a mail steamer on this coast."

SS Königin Luise (Callsign: DKL) was a Barbarossa-class ocean liner built in 1896 by Vulcan Shipbuilding Corp. of Stettin, Germany, for the North German Lloyd line of Bremen. She is mentioned in a report of November 1909 "After the absence of a few years from the Australian service, the N.D.L. liner Konigin Luise is due at Fremantle on Sunday next from Bremerhaven. Since she was here last she had had wireless telegraphy apparatus installed, and Mr. W. Katsenbuy has charge of it."

==== Navy, coastal and ships ====
===== Australian fleet =====
Australian naval warships (more precisely ships of the British navy on Australia station) were increasingly equipped with Marconi apparatus, with communication range often in hundreds of miles.

Garden Island naval station A naval coastal station was established at Garden Island with little fanfare prior to November 1907. In November 1907 the volume of messages being transacted through the station to and from naval ships was so high that there was informal discussion between relevant authorities whether the ships meteorological reports could be regularised and publicly distributed. In July 1909 it was stated that communication was established with RMS Mantua while more than 200 miles from the Heads prior to her arrival on her maiden voyage.

HMS Euryalus was a Cressy-class armoured cruiser built for the Royal Navy around 1900. Badly damaged by multiple accidents while fitting out, she was not completed until 1904. She became flagship of the Australia Station that year and was reduced to reserve upon her return in 1905. Having been fitted with wireless telegraphy, she is recorded as attempting to contact HMS Powerful while in Fremantle harbour, immediately prior to her return to Great Britain.

HMS Powerful was a ship of the Powerful class of protected cruisers in the Royal Navy. She was built by Vickers Limited, Barrow-in-Furness and launched on 24 July 1895. Powerful was fitted with wireless telegraphy equipment and in Australian waters from December 1905. It does appear that the wireless equipment was being continuously refined and updated, as distance being achieved steadily increased. In September 1906 it was reported that "The Powerful left Melbourne for Sydney direct on Wednesday last, and was followed by HMS Cambrian, HMS Psyche, and HMS Encounter. A series of experiments in wireless telegraphy was made on the trip along the coast with great success. Communications were held between the four warships at distances ranging up to 50 miles, and the Powerful, when to the south-ward of Jervis Bay, 90 miles from Sydney, yesterday morning, sent a message to Garden Island, which was received without mutilation." In March 1907, "The following message was received this afternoon at Garden Island Naval Depot by wireless telegraphy from HMS Powerful – 150 miles south. Will arrive 6.30 a.m. tomorrow. Sea moderate. Strong southerly breeze," a new distance record. By September 1909 the equipment had been upgraded and / or refined to the extent that distances almost ten times that were being achieved: "Return of the Admiral, Island Cruise of the Powerful; HMS Powerful, with his Excellency Vice-Admiral Sir Richard Poore and staff on board, reached Sydney at midnight on Saturday from her cruise in the islands. At Port Vila, in the New Hebrides, the Admiral temporarily transferred his flag to the Prometheus, and proceeded, on a voyage of inspection, to all the principal islands of the group. Subsequently the Powerful visited Suva. On the way from Fiji to Sydney heavy weather was encountered, which delayed the Powerful for some hours. Communication was carried on with Sydney by means of wireless telegraphy, over a distance of 1100 miles."

HMS Challenger was a second-class protected cruiser of the Challenger class of the Royal Navy. A February 1907 report states "reached Fremantle yesterday morning from Singapore. Commander Tilbits reported that Singapore was left on January 22, the day before the departure of the flagship and Encounter. Connection was made at Java Heads by wireless telegraphy with HMS Pegasus, which had been receiving a new crew at Colombo from HMS Vindictive. The Pegasus was proceeding to Sydney via the east coast of Australia and Batavia. After passing the Straits of Sunda communication was established by wireless telegraphy with the flagship, and continued until Wednesday, when the ships parted company. The Challenger will sail this morning for Albany." In May 1909, focus was on fully bridging the Tasman Sea by wireless between the naval ports at Sydney and Wellington, but the propagation path shielding in the Cook Strait and Wellington Harbour was proving challenging. In a newspaper report it was stated: "Wireless across the Tasman; Another demonstration of wireless communication between ships of the Australian squadron was given during the voyage of HMS Challenger from Sydney to Wellington. The Challenger was able to communicate with the flagship Powerful, lying in Sydney Harbor, over 1200 miles away, right from the time of her departure from Sydney till when she turned in Cook Strait. Only one period of difficulty was experienced, when the high wind flapping the stays against the wires somewhat interfered with the messages. One night the Challenger spoke the Prometheus on her way to Norfolk Island. One of the officers of the cruiser interviewed at Wellington said:— "The Challenger had only two wires aloft previously, now she has eight. And the rigging has all been insulated, cutting off indirect communication with the earth, and doing away with what the wireless men call the 'screening' of messages. These alterations were made while in Sydney, so that these messages were really a test. Other means of improvement have been discovered, and the system will be made more perfect." Official communications to the Commander-in-Chief at Sydney comprised a large part of the messages sent. News of the fever cases on board was also communicated, and news from beyond Australia – of the two-Power standard, the American Fleet, racing topics, etc. – was received."

HMS Pyramus was a Pelorus-class protected cruiser of the Royal Navy. She was laid down at Palmers Shipbuilding and Iron Company, Jarrow in May 1896, and launched on 15 May 1897. She served in various colonial posts, including the Royal Navy on Australian station from 1905. In the voyage to Australia in late 1905, she encountered numerous boiler failures and these continued throughout the earliest period of her Australian deployment. She was equipped with Marconi wireless telegraphy and in March 1906 is reported as calling HMS Encounter from Garden Island to advise of the problems. She was also the first warship to communicate with the RMS Mantua as she ran up the Australia coast towards Sydney on her maiden voyage to Australia.

HMS Pegasus was one of 11 Pelorus-class protected cruisers ordered for the Royal Navy in 1893 under the Spencer Program and based on the earlier Pearl class. Like all of the Pelorus-class cruisers, she had numerous boiler issues, but was briefly on Australian service around 1905. She was fitted with wireless telegraphy equipment.

HMS Psyche was a Pelorus-class light cruiser built for the Royal Navy at the end of the 19th century. Initially operating on the North America and West Indies Station, the cruiser was transferred to the Australian Squadron in 1903, and remained there until the Royal Australian Navy (RAN) took over responsibility in 1913.

HMS Encounter was a second-class protected cruiser of the Challenger class operated by the Royal Navy and later the Royal Australian Navy. She was built by H.M. Dockyard Devonport and completed at the end of 1905.

HMS Cambrian was a second-class protected cruiser, of the Royal Navy, built at the Pembroke Dockyard and launched on 30 January 1893. She was the last flagship of the Australia Station. In May 1910 she was a participant in a message which set the Fleet's wireless record. "During the voyage of H.M. flagship Powerful to Fremantle the fleet record for wireless telegraphy in Australian waters was established by the ship. When nearing Fremantle she was able to receive a message from HMS Cambrian in port, at Hobart, a distance of over 1,500 miles away. The Cambrian requested to know if the Powerful had any instructions for her, to which query the Powerful sent a negative reply."

HMS Pioneer was a Pelorus-class light cruiser built for the Royal Navy at the end of the 19th century. A brief report in November 1909 stated: "Wireless signals from HMS Powerful in Sydney Harbor have been picked up by the Pioneer, lying at Lyttelton. This is the first time such signals have been projected across the Tasman Sea without retransmission."

===== Japanese fleet =====
Japanese naval training squadron, Australian visit 1903. In March 1903 it was announced that the Japanese naval training squadron, consisting of the Matsushima, Itsukushima and Hashidate, would be visiting Australia. Rear Admiral Kamimura was in command of the squadron. Note that it was the practice of the squadron for the commander to regularly rotate ship to maximise training effectiveness for all crew, hence the flagship also would regularly rotate. All three cruisers were fitted with Marconi wireless telegraphy equipment. The squadron had left Yokosuka, Japan on 15 February and the tour included Hong Kong, Singapore, Batavia, Perth (Itsukushima, awaiting news of other two cruisers, 4 April to X April), Onslow (Matsushima and Hashidate, unscheduled due to damage to Matsushima during cyclone, X April to X April), Carnarvon (unscheduled due to cyclone dame & resultant need for recoaling, 19 April to 21 April), Perth (22 April to 30 April), Adelaide (7 May to 13 May), Melbourne (16 May to 30 May), Hobart (1 June to 2 June), Sydney (5 June to 14 June), Townsville (????), Thursday Island (1 July), Manila, Amoy, Fusan, Formosa, returning to Yokosuka.

Japanese naval training squadron, Australian visit 1906. In March 1906 it was announced that the Japanese naval training squadron, consisting again of the Matsushima, Itsukushima and Hashidate, would again be visiting Australia. Rear Admiral Shimamura was in command of the squadron. All three cruisers were fitted with Marconi wireless telegraphy equipment. The squadron had left Yokosuka, Japan on 15 February and the tour schedule included Korean ports, Chinese ports, Manila, Thursday Island (18 April to 20 April), Townsville, Melbourne (9 May to 17 May), Sydney (21 May to 28 May), Goode Island (Thursday Island) (10 June), Batavia, Singapore, Formosa, returning to Yokosuka.

Japanese naval training squadron, Australian visit 1907. In March 1907 it was announced that the Japanese naval training squadron, consisting again of the Matsushima, Itsukushima and Hashidate, would again be visiting Australia, albeit briefly. Rear Admiral Tomioka was in command of the squadron. All three cruisers were fitted with Marconi wireless telegraphy equipment. The squadron had left Yokosuka, Japan on X February and the tour schedule included Honolulu (Hawaii), Suva (Fiji) (19 March to 25 March), Wellington (New Zealand) (31 March to 7 April), Brisbane (13 April), Thursday Island, Batavia, Singapore, returning to Yokosuka.

Japanese naval training squadron, Australian visit 1910. In February 1910 it was announced that the Japanese naval training squadron, consisting of the Aso and the Soya would be visiting Australia. Rear Admiral Hikojirō was in command of the squadron. Both cruisers were fitted with Telefunken wireless telegraphy equipment. The tour included Thursday Island (3 March), Townsville (7 March to 13 March), Brisbane (13 March to 17 March), Sydney (19 March to 27 March), Hobart (30 March to 4 April), Melbourne (7 April to 16 April), Adelaide (19 April to 23 April), Albany (29 April to 2 May), Fremantle (4 May to 11 May), Batavia, Suraybaya, Singapore, Hong Kong, Formosa, Shanghai, returning to Yokosuka.

Matsushima (松島) (Callsign ?) was a Matsushima-class protected cruiser of the Imperial Japanese Navy. She was part of the Japanese squadron of three cruisers (initially the flagship) which visited Australia in 1903, all of which were equipped with Marconi wireless telegraphy. In perhaps the first recorded instance of wireless telegraphy being put to practical effect (rather than simple communication) near Australian waters, when the three cruisers of the squadron became separated during a cyclone and the Matsushima damaged her boilers, she announced her plight by wireless telegraphy and the Hashidate came to her aid. The two cruisers then travelled in company to the calmer waters of Exmouth Gulf, where repairs were effected. At this stage the Rear-Admiral transferred to the Hashidate, which then became the flagship for the remainder of the tour. The Matsushima was sunk in 1908 in a terrible accident with the loss of more than 200 lives.

Itsukushima (厳島) (Callsign JUN) was the lead ship in the Matsushima class of protected cruisers of the Imperial Japanese Navy. The Japanese cruiser became separated from its squadron in the course of cyclonic weather in April 1903 and was the first to arrive at the port of Fremantle, thereby becoming the first vessel of the squadron to make port in Australia. The ship was equipped with wireless telegraphy equipment.

Hashidate (橋立) (Callsign JUO) was the third (and final vessel) in the Matsushima class of protected cruisers in the Imperial Japanese Navy. She was part of the Japanese squadron which visited Australia in 1903, all of which were equipped with Marconi wireless telegraphy. An enterprising reporter has provided a comprehensive account of the Hashidate while in Sydney Harbour.

Aso (Callsign JRL) was originally the cruiser Bayan, the name ship of the four Bayan-class armoured cruisers built for the Imperial Russian Navy in the first decade of the 20th century. She struck a mine and sank during the Russo-Japanese War of 1904–05. She was salvaged and extensively repaired by the Imperial Japanese Navy, then renamed the Aso. She served initially as a training ship. She was equipped with Telefunken wireless telegraphy apparatus and visited Australia in 1910 as part of the visit of the training squadron. On 6 May 1910, the Encounter and HMS Challenger were also at Fremantle port, and the Encounter wirelessed an invitation to Admiral Ijichi to attend a dinner with Vice-Admiral Poore on board HMS Powerful on 7 May 1910, the latter ship being about to enter the port also.

Soya (Callsign JLD) was originally the Russian cruiser Varyag. The ship was badly damaged during the Russo-Japanese War of 1904–05 and scuttled. After the war, she was salvaged by the Imperial Japanese Navy and extensively repaired. She was renamed the Soya and served initially as a training ship. She was equipped with Telefunken wireless telegraphy apparatus and visited Australia in 1910 as part of the visit of the training squadron.

===== US fleet =====
The "Great White Fleet" of the US visited Australia (Sydney, Melbourne, Albany) in August and September 1908. The depth of fond sentiment towards the United States displayed can be gauged by the following:

The Fleet that is Coming to Sydney; An official despatch from Washington states that Rear Admiral Robley D. Evans, in charge of the major portion of the battle fleet of the United States, will leave San Francisco on July 6. The fleet will visit Hawaii, Samoa, Melbourne, and Sydney. It will then proceed to the Philippines for the autumn gunnery practice, and return to the Atlantic, via the Suez Canal. The Right Hon. James Bryce, British Ambassador at Washington, supported the Commonwealth's invitation to the fleet to visit Australia. On Saturday evening, at the Centenary Hall, Sydney, when the Prime Minister concluded his address on national defence, he intimated that he had just received a cable message to the effect that the American fleet would visit Melbourne and Sydney. In an instant the hall rang with tumultuous cheering. Mr. Deakin, waiting with uplifted hand, for a lull in the storm, presently shouted: 'The least we can do is to give three cheers for the United States.' The great audience rose en masse, and cheer after cheer was given to the waving of hats and canes and handkerchiefs. The Prime Minister: I venture to say that a welcome such as that fleet has never known, outside its own country at all events, will be given it in Australia. (Great cheering.)

The fleet entered Sydney Harbour on 20 August 1908 with a vast and tumultuous welcome in a "spectacle of unparalleled majesty" viewed by more than half a million people. After a week of celebrations, the fleet departed for Melbourne 28 August 1908. It was less than two days steaming before the fleet arrived at Port Phillip, Melbourne to a welcome on 29 August 1908 only slightly more subdued than that at Sydney. After the scheduled week in Melbourne, the fleet departed on 5 September 1908 with the newspapers of the day publishing patriotic poems about the visit. The fleet's arrival a few hours early on 11 September 1908 at Albany, Western Australia (the then small town with the large harbour), caught the residents and many country visitors literally napping. When the word spread there was a rush of people to the vantage points on the heads and elsewhere. A further week in Albany allowed both coaling operations and celebrations, with the majority of the fleet departing 18 September 1908. While the fleet did not visit any other Australian ports, it closely hugged the Western Australian coastline on its way to Manila and local shipping companies did good business taking tourist out to view the fleet under steam.

For Australia, with wireless telegraphy equipment only deployed to a handful of British naval vessels on Australia Station at the time, the temporary presence of the Great White Fleet meant a 200+ per cent increase in its wireless systems. The vast majority of vessels in the US fleet were equipped with wireless telegraphy. It is curious that a wide variety of different wireless systems were being utilised by the US fleet, with no known inter-operability issues. Yet a few years later, Australia remained concerned about the ability of each system to work with the others. The vessels and their wireless equipments were as follows:

- USS Ajax (relief, callsign BD)
- USS Connecticut (flagship, callsign DC, Shoemaker system, wavelength 425 metres, power 3 kW)
- USS Culgoa (auxiliary, callsign DG, Composite system, wavelength 425 metres, power 3 kW)
- USS Georgia (callsign EM, Stone system, wavelength 425 metres, power 2 kW)
- USS Glacier (auxiliary, callsign EN, Composite system, wavelength 425 metres, power 2 kW)
- USS Illinois (callsign FL, Fessenden system, wavelength 425 metres, power 1 kW)
- USS Kansas (callsign GF, Stone system, wavelength 425 metres, power 5 kW)
- USS Kearsarge (callsign GI, Composite system, wavelength 425 metres, power 2 kW)
- USS Kentucky (callsign GK, Composite system, wavelength 425 metres, power 2 kW)
- USS Louisiana (callsign GT, Shoemaker system, wavelength 425 metres, power 3 kW)
- USS Minnesota (callsign HO, Stone system, wavelength 425 metres, power 3 kW)
- USS Missouri (callsign HQ, Composite system, wavelength 425 metres, power 2 kW)
- USS Nebraska (callsign IE, Telefunken system, wavelength 425 metres, power 3 kW)
- USS New Jersey (callsign IK, Shoemaker system, wavelength 425 metres, power 3 kW)
- USS Ohio (callsign IW, Shoemaker system, wavelength 425 metres, power 2 kW)
- USS Panther (auxiliary, (callsign JG, Composite system, wavelength 425 metres, power 2½kW))
- USS Rhode Island (callsign KA, Shoemaker system, wavelength 425 metres, power 1½kW)
- USS Vermont (callsign LO, Telefunken system, wavelength 425 metres, power 3 kW)
- USS Virginia (callsign LQ, Shoemaker system, wavelength 425 metres, power 3 kW)
- USS Wisconsin (callsign MB, Shoemaker system, wavelength 425 metres, power 3 kW)
- USS Yankton (relief, callsign MK, Telefunken system, wavelength 425 metres, power 1 kW)

As the fleet steamed west from Pearl Harbor, its movements were widely reported in the media as "wireless messages" and "Marconigrams". But the implied directness was not representative and the messages had to almost circumnavigate the globe due to the lack of receiving facilities in Australasia, coupled together with the British Admiralty's refusal to communicate with non-Marconi systems:

How Wireless Messages were Obtained. Mr. Henry M. Collins (general manager for Australasia of Reuter's Telegraph Company, Limited) wrote to us under date Melbourne, August 6:— "As a good deal of curiosity has been aroused by the wireless telegrams received by this company from the American Fleet during the past few days, it may be of interest to the public to know how the information has been obtained. For some time past endeavours have been in progress to get into touch with the battleships before their arrival at Auckland for which port they steamed direct from Honolulu. It was at first attempted to establish communication through the good offices of the British Admiral; but it was found on enquiry that HMS Powerful could not exchange wireless messages with the American vessels, presumably because different systems are employed. During last week the United States storeship Glacier arrived at Suva, and on Friday we learned from our correspondent there that efforts would be made to speak with our representative on board one of the battleships on Tuesday, the 4th instant, at a distance of 1,200 miles. Meanwhile it would be sought to establish a chain of communications on our behalf through the United States vessel Yankton, then lying at Tonga, and the Panther, at the coaling station Pago Pago, in the Samoan group. In this success was achieved, with the result that we have been able to place the information so obtained at the disposal of your readers on five days in succession. As the Glacier left Suva today the aerial "chain" has been broken — for the time being, at least."

Prior to the fleet's arrival in Australia, there was only a brief report that Lee de Forest's wireless telephony equipment had been installed in the vessels of the Great White Fleet. However, while the Great White Fleet was in Australian ports, there was surprisingly little reference to the ships' wireless telegraphy equipment. But a month after the fleet's departure, a detailed report was provided stating that all the warships were not only equipped with wireless telegraphy equipment, but also for wireless telephony. This is among the earliest recorded use of the latter technology in the Commonwealth:

All the ships in the American fleet which recently left Australian waters are fitted with a wireless telephone, besides the usual wireless telegraph gear. The success of the installation of this system — invented by Dr De Forest — has been so thoroughly established that it has been possible to establish communication thereby to distances up to 25 miles. The average working range, however, is about five or 10 miles. The system is a comparatively new one, a successful demonstration of it not having been given until the middle of last year. Seeing the value of such a useful addition to the wireless telegraph, the United States Navy authorities at once ordered trial sets of the instruments to be installed in the battleships Connecticut and Virginia, in conjunction with a shore station. It proved of such value during the grounding of the Kentucky, in Hampton Roads, that it was decided to fit all the ships of Admiral Evans's fleet with it before they left for their voyage round the world. This was done with the utmost despatch, and a month or two later everything was complete.

The article goes on to fully describe the aerial, the transmitting gear and the receiving gear. The lack of detailed reporting on such an important development can be explained by the fact that the US Navy had found the equipment to be too unreliable to meet their needs at all sets were removed upon the fleet's return to Hampton Roads, Virginia.

==== Land military ====
In August 1909 Major Cox-Taylor gave a lecture describing a portable wireless station, and advocated wide deployment in war time. On 28 March 1910 at the Easter camp conducted at Heathcote NSW, George Taylor organised for the attendance of 3 civilians to bring their own equipment and conduct experiments to show his superiors the practical application of wireless telegraphy in the field. The civilians were Edward Hope Kirkby Walter Hannam and Reginald Wilkinson who were credited by Taylor in his own written account.

==== Wireless Telegraphy Act 1905 ====
The United Kingdom enacted it Wireless Telegraphy Act in 1904 and it was considered within Australia that a similar approach should be taken.

While it appeared clear that the Constitution of the Commonwealth of Australia placed responsibility for wireless telegraphy with the Commonwealth rather than the individual States and Territories, to remove any possible doubt, the Wireless Telegraphy Act of 1905 made this explicit. The Wireless Telegraphy Act, No. 8 of 1905 may be cited as the Wireless Telegraphy Act 1905 and was assented to 18 October 1905. The initial Act was brief and to the point, being only a single page and even after almost 80 years of amendments, remained equally concise when finally repealed in 1983. The Act:

- Defined Australia (in the context of the Act) to include the territorial waters of the Commonwealth and any territory of the Commonwealth
- Defined "Wireless telegraphy" to include all systems of transmitting and receiving telegraphic messages by means of electricity without a continuous metallic connexion between the transmitter and the receiver
- Was defined not to apply to ships belonging to the King's Navy
- Gave the Postmaster-General the exclusive privilege of establishing, erecting, maintaining, and using stations and appliances for the purpose of
  - transmitting messages by wireless telegraphy within Australia, and receiving messages so transmitted
  - transmitting messages by wireless telegraphy from Australia to any place or ship outside Australia
  - receiving in Australia messages transmitted by wireless telegraphy from any place or ship outside Australia
- Provided penalty for breach of Act
- Provided for forfeiture of appliances unlawfully erected
- Search warrants for appliances unlawfully erected
- Gave the Postmaster-General the right to institute proceeding
- Gave the Governor-General the right to make regulations, prescribing all matters for carrying out or giving effect to this Act

==== Coastal network proposals ====
In the 1900s there were several unsolicited proposals from major wireless companies seeking to gain a footing in the Australasian market. The proposals were often heavily discounted and strongly guaranteed in the knowledge that initial acceptance would likely lead to further contracts.

==== Postal Union Congress ====
The Postmaster-General (Austin Chapman) attended the Postal Union Congress in Rome in May 1906. While in Italy (and previously in London), he met with Marconi company representatives in company with his New Zealand counterpart (Joseph Ward) and discussed latest developments in wireless telegraphy and possibilities for Australian deployment and communication with New Zealand and Pacific islands. Again in Italy, he visited the Marconi station at Monte Mario, and sent and received wireless messages (no doubt with the aid of a competent telegraphist) with another station 200 miles distant. Chapman was intrigued by the wireless inker system of recording the messages and retained several as mementos of the experience. Upon his return to Australia in July 1906, he waxed eloquent about wireless telegraphy, but stressed the need for Australia to select the "best system." In the end there was no timely development and Australia remained truly wireless.

==== Intra-Imperial Wireless Conference ====
In late 1909 a conference was held in Melbourne of all parties interested in the establishment of a chain of wireless stations link Australia, New Zealand and the islands of the southwest Pacific.

==== The Taylor phenomenon ====
George Augustine Taylor is remembered today mostly for his advocacy for commencement of high power wireless broadcasting in Australia during the mid-1920s through the efforts of his Association for the Development of Wireless in Australia, New Zealand and Fiji. But arguably his work in the late 1900s and early 1910s was even more valuable. Within a civilian/military context he was responsible for demonstrations of the practical military applications for wireless. He then went on to demonstrate that wireless could be used in moving railway trains (and associated signalling applications) and transmission of pictures by wireless. Taylor was solely driven by patriotic intent and without any commercial motivation. His inventions were claimed by others, sometimes decade or more subsequent. Taylor, although an advocate never invented anything. At his demonstrations and lectures he always used Edward Hope Kirkby and wireless equipment manufactured by him. Taylor's own publication recognises this fact

=== 1910s ===
==== WIA Established ====
The public at large was fascinated by wireless generally, and individuals with a practical bent were wanting to explore the technology for themselves. While the WT Act 1905 made specific provision for licensing of wireless experimenters, the PMG's Department employed its absolute discretion in the matter to great effect with only a handful of private licences issued before 1910. Robert Scott made much of the secrecy provisions and penalties for interfering with Government communications. George Augustine Taylor was a prominent patriot advocating for the need for more support for aviation and wireless in Australia with a view to its future defence. As early as October 1909 he was publicly stating the need for an institute to represent the interests of private experimenters and particularly to press for relaxation of policy in respect of licensing of wireless experimenters. It was clearly implied that many wireless experimenters were being forced to operate without licences. Hannam was becoming incredibly frustrated, having waited 18 months for his application to be processed and he embarked upon a publicity campaign to try to change the system. His efforts were eventually assisted by solicitor F. H. Leverrier, another experimenter desiring a licence. The timing of the campaign seemed rather more than fortuitous. On 11 March 1910 a preliminary meeting was held with a view to formally constituting an institute. The Daily Telegraph reported the event under the catchcry headline Three Guineas for the use of the Air: Wireless telegraphy experimenters and enthusiasts are beginning to co-operate, and a number met last afternoon in the Hotel Australia in order to take the preliminary steps towards forming an institution. Vigorous comment was made upon the Government's action in regard to experimental licences, and it was plain that besides a feeling for mutual help and interest, the restrictions alleged had had a large share in hurrying on the movement. Two ladies were among those present. Mr. G. A. Taylor, who was elected chairman, explained the object of the meeting, and touched on the wonderful future ahead of the movement. "It is wise," he said, "to put our heads together and profit by each other's discoveries. Experimenters did not think the authorities were giving them fair encouragement. Every experimenter was at the beck and call of the military, naval, and postal authorities, and was allowed no legal redress if departmental officers thought he was breaking the rules. Mr. Taylor proposed the formation of an institution amongst experimenters and enthusiasts in wireless, for their mutual benefit. The object of founding the institution was to obtain justice, he explained; it would not be founded in opposition to any Government institution or department. Walter Henry Hannam, seconding the motion, repeated the account of his attempts to obtain a Government license. I have had a great deal of trouble with three Postmaster-Generals," said he, "and haven't got my license yet. They're still quibbling. We have all been treated in the same way, but no one has said or done anything until lately. Seventeen months of my time have been wasted since I was ready to erect my plant. Why should we have to pay three guineas for the use of the air, so far as experiments are concerned? The aerial navigation experimenters are charged nothing." One regulation, he complained, penalised an experimenter if the chief electrical engineer of the Postmaster-General's Department should certify telegraphic communication had been interfered with by his wireless appliance used "or intended to be used"! J. H. A. Pike also supported the motion, which was carried, and a provisional committee was appointed to arrange for the next meeting. Later, a general meeting of those interested will be called, and officers elected. It is proposed to assist in the formation of, and perhaps affiliate with, similar organisations in other States. The provisional committee is as follows:— J. H. A. Pike, Walter Henry Hannam, F. Bartholomew, W. H. Gosche, F. H. Leverrier, F. A. Cleary, and A. Garnsey, Major Rosenthal, Captain Cox-Taylor, Dr. Brissenden, and the chairman. Mr. Hannam will act as hon. secretary pro tem. Besides these gentlemen, the Misses Perratt Hill, and Messrs. R. B. Armstrong and J. A. Henderson attended, and gave in their names as prospective members. On 22 April 1910 the first formal meeting was held at the Employers' Federation rooms. There were 36 in attendance and it was announced that membership already stood at 70 persons. The name "Institute of Wireless Telegraphy" was adopted.

==== Prominent experimenters ====
- J. H. A. Pike
- Walter Henry Hannam
- William Henry Haire
- Reginald Wilkinson
- Australasian Antarctic Expedition 1911–1914

==== Coastal network Tranche 0 ====
===== Floating coastal stations =====
The delay of more than a decade by Australia in commencing to establish a network of coastal stations, meant that Australia had failed to keep pace with the deployment of wireless fitouts on shipping. Many shipping lines insisted that the capital and ongoing expense of wireless equipment would not be incurred until at least the high-powered stations in the coastal radio network had been established. But since these ships were often also operating in other regions where coastal stations existed, many ships proceeded with wireless regardless. As a result, the large numbers of wireless equipped ships plying the Australian coast at any given time in the early 1910s, meant that ships remote from ports could often relay messages through other ships closer to port, to give effect to communication upon its arrival.

==== Coastal network Tranche 1 ====
===== Hotel Australia =====
The Australasian Wireless Co. had established a low power experimental station at Hotel Australia, Castlereagh St, Sydney. Hotel Australia was at the time, Australia's most luxurious hotel and the destination of choice for the wealthy and famous. The hotel was the venue for the first meeting for the establishment of the Wireless Institute of Australia in March 1910. This station itself, was useful to the company, primarily for testing equipment at its main station at Underwood St, Sydney (the head office for the Bulletin, part owner of the company). It is first reported in the press in November 1910, but this appears to be a major upgrade rather than initial usage. Medium power equipment was transferred at this time from Underwood Street and a large antenna installed on the rooftop of the hotel, at its highest 80 ft. above the roof (170 ft. AGL). The wireless apparatus was installed in a room immediately below the roof. The apparatus was of the Telefunken system, the company having the rights to that system in Australia. The PMG allocated the callsign AAA. Despite its brief existence, the station made its mark in history. On 5 December 1910, a journalist of the Sydney Sun conducted an "interview" with world champion sculler Dick Arnst, by means of the Hotel Australia station and the fitted-for-wireless RMS Ulimaroa. This was claimed as an Australian first. In a sideline story, the journalist provides an eloquent description of the wireless room. In another triumph, the Hotel Australia station played a major part in establishing that the training ship Mersey was fine when fears were held for her safety at sea.

Due to delays in the establishment of the high power Pennant Hills coastal station, Australasian Wireless Co. (the contractors for the construction of the Pennant Hills station), sought and received a commercial licence to establish at their own cost a temporary facility at Hotel Australia. This new licence was given effect without material change to the technical equipment already installed there. But now the company could advertise its formal approval to solicit communications with nearby merchant shipping, and to charge for the service. The station formally commenced service on 3 June 1911. The service appears to have been an immediate commercial success and daily advertisements offering communication appeared in the local newspapers, together with a list of ships expected to be within wireless range on the day. It is telling that the Postmaster-General's Department intervened with the Australasian Wireless Co. to increase the rates for transmission of messages. This was to ensure parity with future charges for the Pennant Hills station.

A controversy enveloped the station 1 January 1912 when Farmer, the operator of the station reported brief wireless contact with the Macquarie Island station of the Australasian Antarctic Expedition immediately after the Island being in communication with HMS Encounter. Subsequently, the Encounter asserted that no such communication had occurred and the PMG made definitive statements to that effect. It was considered in the press that Farmer had been the victim of a hoax. But Farmer held to his statements. Hotel Australia was using Telefunken equipment identical to that at Macquarie Island which was distinctive in note. Also the two Macquarie Island wireless operators were Charles Albert Sandell and Arthur John Sawyer. Sandell was formerly a Sydney experimenter while Sawyer, immediately prior to the expedition, was the chief operator at the Hotel Australia station. Farmer would have been familiar with the "fist" (the distinctive operating style) of either operator, and on balance of evidence it does appear that the contact occurred, despite it being the height of summer in the southern hemisphere. Farmer nevertheless promptly responded to Macquarie Island when a message was relayed from the RMS Ulimaroa to Hotel Australia, being a message from Sawyer to his mother. P. Farmer quickly established direct communication with Macquarie Island, which stated that they had been hearing Hotel Australia for some time. Farmer provided a vast amount of Australian news for the island's crew and undertook to provide daily updates henceforth.

This was an era of rapid repositioning in wireless regulation. Balsillie had been engaged as Commonwealth wireless expert and offered his "Australian Wireless" system gratis to the Commonwealth. The Australian Wireless system was evaluated by an independent expert and found to be more efficient than either the Marconi system or the Telefunken system. The Commonwealth promptly swung its support behind the Australian Wireless system. The first two coastal stations had been contracted to Australasian Wireless Co. but the Commonwealth now swiftly proceeded with new stations commencing with Melbourne (callsign VIM) and Hobart (VIH). Pennant Hills (callsign VIS) was essentially complete, but the Commonwealth would not sign off on "practical completion". Australasian Wireless Co. did not seem entirely unhappy with this system, as it permitted the commercial operations at Hotel Australia to continue for a longer period than envisaged. Finally, on 3 June 1912, the department gave three months notice of cancellation of the commercial licence, stating that if Pennant Hills was not complete at that time, they would make alternative arrangements. Circa 3 September 1912 the AAA equipment was relocated back to Underwood St (becoming callsign ATY). The "alternative arrangements" alluded to by the PMG were made clear on 10 September 1912 when equipment at Pennant Hills failed, only a few days after cancellation of the licence and the outage was covered by wireless apparatus at Father Shaw's wireless factory at Randwick, the facility at Hotel Australia being dismantled.

===== AAM Hotel Menzies =====
The Postmaster-General approved the establishment of another commercial licence for AWCL at the Menzies Hotel in Melbourne. The callsign AAM List of wireless telegraph stations of the world, 1912 was allocated by the PMG's Department, however there appear to be no reports of actual operation by the station, so it is probable that the proposal did not proceed.

==== Coastal network Tranche 2 ====
The high power government coastal station at Sydney had originally been specified in the contract with Australasian Wireless Co., Ltd. to be at a coastal location. This was with a view to taking full advantage of superior radiofrequency propagation across sea water. But Defence had not been properly consulted and when they became fully aware of the circumstances, they insisted on an inland location to provide immunity from enemy shelling. Eventually the Pennant Hills location was selected and acquired, but in order to be confident of meeting contractual performance requirements, Australasian Wireless insisted that the transmission facility be of greater power. A substantial increase in contracted price resulted.

- VIS Sydney (commenced xxxx, callsign during testing by Australasian Wireless unknown, then POS for Post Office Sydney, after 1912 convention VIS)
- VIP Perth (commenced xxxx, callsign during testing by Australasian Wireless MNS, initially proposed though never implemented POF for Post Office Fremantle, then POS for Post Office Sydney, after 1912 convention VIS)

From 1912, the government progressively established a wide network of low and high power coastal stations to facilitate communications with shipping throughout the Commonwealth. The earlier temporary stations were replaced and the network expanded, eventually consuming the entire series of callsigns VIA to VIZ.

==== Coastal network Tranche 3 ====
Following the Government's decision to utilise Balsillie's system for all further deployments in the Coastal network, developments proceeded apace and all capital cities were quickly provided with wireless telegraph stations:

- VIM Melbourne (commenced 8 February 1912, callsign initially POM for Post Office Melbourne)
- VIH Hobart (commenced 30 April 1912, callsign initially POH for Post Office Hobart)
- VIB Brisbane (commenced 2 September 1912, callsign initially POB for Post Office Brisbane)
- VIA Adelaide (commenced 1 October 1912, callsign initially POA for Post Office Adelaide)

===== VIM Melbourne =====
(commenced 8 February 1912)

===== VIH Hobart =====
(commenced 30 April 1912)

===== VIB Brisbane =====
(commenced 2 September 1912)

===== VIA Adelaide =====
(commenced 1 October 1912) Balsillie arrived in Adelaide 3 July to undertake preliminaries for the construction of the station. Previously in Hobart, he had undertaken tests of various types earth systems, but stated that the Adelaide system would be conventional. The transmitter site was stated to be Rosewater near Port Adelaide. On 5 July 1912 he proceeded to Brisbane and was to return to Adelaide subsequently with the raising tackle.

==== International Radiotelegraph Convention 1912 ====
Most countries with existing or proposed coastal radio services participated in a conference in London. The primary work of the conference was to prepare a Convention to govern overall principles of operation of their services as well as a set of Regulations to details specifics of operation and protocols to be adhered to.

==== Coastal network Tranche 4 ====
From 1912, the government progressively established a wide network of low and high power coastal stations to facilitate communications with shipping throughout the Commonwealth. The earlier temporary stations were replaced and the network expanded, eventually consuming the entire series of callsigns VIA to VIZ. Upon the completion of the capital city stations, work commenced on further stations at commercially and defence-strategic locations and Australia finally had a network capable of servicing all vessels plying their trade in passengers and cargo along its vast coastline:

- VII Thursday Island, Qld. (commenced 26 February 1913)
- VIG Port Moresby, Papua (commenced 26 February 1913, callsign later changed to VJZ)
- VIY Mt Gambier, S.A. (commenced 1 March 1913)
- VIN Geraldton, W.A. (commenced 12 May 1913)
- VIR Rockhampton, Qld. (commenced 24 May 1913)
- VIC Cooktown, Qld. (commenced 12 June 1913, closed circa 1948, callsign later allocated 1960s Carnarvon, W.A.)
- VIE Esperance, W.A. (commenced 21 July 1913)
- VIT Townsville, Qld. (commenced 7 August 1913)
- VIO Broome, W.A. (commenced 18 August 1913)
- VID Darwin, N.T. (commenced 25 September 1913)
- VIL Flinders Island, Tas. (commenced 8 October 1913)
- VIZ Roebourne, W.A. (commenced 26 January 1914)
- VIW Wyndham, W.A. (commenced 18 May 1914)
- King Island, Tas. (commenced January 1916)

===== VII Thursday Island, Qld. =====
(commenced 26 February 1913)

===== VIG Port Moresby, Papua =====
(commenced 26 February 1913)

===== VIY Mt Gambier, S.A. =====
(commenced 1 March 1913)

===== VIN Geraldton, W.A. =====
(commenced 12 May 1913)

===== VIR Rockhampton, Qld. =====
(commenced 24 May 1913)

===== VIC Cooktown, Qld. =====
(commenced 12 June 1913) VIC was originally intended for construction after the VIT Townsville station, but there were difficulties with site acquisition at Townsville and VIC was brought forward. When, in November 1912, supervising engineer A. S. MacDonald arrived at Townsville to arrange onforwarding of the wireless apparatus to Cooktown, there was concern in the town that Townsville would be removed from the deployment programme. Formal protest by the local Chamber of Commerce was made. In late November 1912 it was reported that: "During last week over 20 men were employed in making a passable road to Bald Hill, the site of the wireless station (says the Cooktown Independent of 26 November), and on Friday a start was made by Mr T. E. Thomas, with a team of five horses, in carting the material. On Sunday afternoon quite a large number of people were to be seen climbing the hill out of curiosity to see the site on which the station is to be erected." The wooden mast was hauled into position 8 January 1913. The station commenced 12 June 1913. In early July 1913 it was reported: "The local wireless station has been sending and receiving messages for the past three weeks. The longest station so far communicated with was New Zealand, a distance of about 2,800 miles."

===== VIE Esperance, W.A. =====
In September 1912, John Graeme Balsillie was at the Perth coastal station to confirm performance of VIP and stated that Esperance was to be included in the coastal network and would be commissioned before June 1913. The Albany Chamber of Commerce had been seeking the installation of a coastal station at Albany, but in January 1913 the PMG Department advised that Esperance was the chosen location and as the range of that station would be 350 miles, an Albany station would not be required. The oversight of construction of the station was to have been entirely by Mr. Cox. The Western Mail of 24 January 1913 reported: "Work has commenced on the wireless station. Mr Cox is the officer in charge and Mr Mason the operator. The site chosen is on Dempster's Head, and has an elevation of about 300ft. with an uninterrupted view of the Southern Ocean, except for a few islands." However at the end of January 1913, Cox was relieved in order to proceed to Wyndham and select a site there and to overcome other difficulties with that station. A detailed progress report on the installation at the end of March 1913 also sheds light on the process of erecting a typical mast of the medium power stations:

The work is progressing (says a correspondent) at the Wireless on Radio Telegraph Station at Esperance, and the mast, one of the principal items of a station, is erected to enable the aerial wires to be suspended at a suitable height, so that intervening obstacles will not obstruct the message. The mast has been built on the site where the station is erected, and is 160 feet in length, having about 5880 superficial feet of oregon, bolted and coach screwed together, and is 21 in. square, its approximate weight being 25 tons. Three thousand bolts have been used in the putting of the mast together. The planning and construction of the mast has been carried out under the supervision of Mr. Mason, of Melbourne, and the work compares favourably with any of the similar masts that have been erected on the Australian coast. The raising of this lengthy and weighty mast is a work requiring skill and experience. Mr. J. Johnson of Melbourne, had this part of the work entrusted to him, of which he is an expert. A derrick, 40 feet in height, was erected first and by means of this derrick the jury mast, which was built on top of the mast as it lay on the ground, was raised to an upright position. This jury mast, 75 feet in height, was built up of oregon planks, to a width of 21 in. square and it weighs about 10 tons. The heel of the jury mast was fixed with stout iron plates and bolted on top at the heels of the mast, and five banjo stays from the top of the jury mast were fixed to the main mast at 25 feet apart. These stays hold the mast all along its length and prevents its buckling. An 8-inch Manila rope, through purchase blocks, was fixed to the top of the jury mast, and to a powerful winch. The winch is geared at 32 to 1, and with this eight men were able to raise the mast from the ground, a lift which is estimated to have a pull equal to a 90-ton load, and in pulling down the jury mast the mast slowly but surely ascended to its height of 160 feet. The time taken in raising the mast occupied five and a half hours, and the mast now stands in the proper position and is quite a landmark, and can be seen for miles around. The mast is erected on an ebbwater position. The surface is of concrete. The foundation on which the mast stands is about 250 feet above sea level. The mast is guyed by 12 wire stays at the four corners of the compass. On top of the mast is a 20 ft. gaff, from which the aerial wires are suspended, and that on which the messages are received and conveyed. The electrical parts of the wireless station are entrusted to Mr. M. L. Lloyd, who has had experience in wireless telegraphy. The buildings in which the engines and receiving stations are to be are in course of construction. The walls are of concrete, and this part of the work is carried out under the supervision of Mr G. Riley, and with the gang of men under him he will soon, have the buildings completed. The station, when in working order, will be lit up by electric light, generated on the station. The Esperance Radio Telegraph station will undoubtedly be one of the sights of Esperance.

VIE formally commenced operation 21 July 1913. After the commencement of WW1, a brigade of 20 men was despatched to Esperance for the purpose of guarding the wireless station. The Albany Advertiser reported: "On Wednesday morning 20 men of the 88th Infantry Brigade arrived at Albany by train, en route for Esperance. Upon arrival Lieut. Morris, who is in charge, formed the men up outside the station. After being inspected by Major Meeks they were marched to the steamer Eucla, lying at the Town Jetty. The squad are going to Esperance for the purpose of guarding the wireless station." In early 1916, Charles Albert Sandell one of the wireless operators at the Macquarie Island station of the Australasian Antarctic Expedition was stationed at Esperance and gave a lecture there about his Antarctic experiences.

===== VIT Townsville, Qld. =====
(commenced 7 August 1913)

===== VIO Broome, W.A. =====
(commenced 18 August 1913)

===== VID Darwin, N.T. =====
(commenced 25 September 1913)

===== VIL Flinders Island, Tas. =====
(commenced 8 October 1913)

===== VIZ Roebourne, W.A. =====
(commenced 26 January 1914)

===== VIW Wyndham, W.A. =====
(commenced 18 May 1914)

===== King Island, Tas. =====
(commenced January 1916)

==== AWA established ====
Ernest Fisk (1886–1965) was the dominant figure among numerous pioneers in early wireless developments. Fisk headed AWA during 1917–44, when it was a leader in electronics manufacturing and broadcasting.

==== War Precautions Act 1914 ====
The War Precautions Act, No 10 of 1914 was an Act to enable the Governor-General to make Regulations and Orders for the safety of the Commonwealth during the present state of war. It was assented to 29 October 1914. The Act was brief and incorporated into the Defence Act 1903–1912. It was designed:

- to prevent persons communicating with the enemy, or obtaining information for that purpose or for any purpose calculated to jeopardize the success of the operations of any of His Majesty's forces, in Australia or elsewhere, or to assist the enemy; or
- to secure, the safety of any means of communication or of any railways, docks, harbors, or public works; or
- to prevent the spread of reports likely to cause disaffection or alarm.

The Act was extensively amended through the course of WW1, twice in 1915, again in 1916, and finally in 1918, before being repealed in 1920 by the War Precautions Act Repeal Act 1920.

The War Precautions Act itself was silent in respect of specific provisions addressing wireless telegraphy, however the War Precautions Regulations (Statutory Rules, 1915, No 77) of 19 May 1915 rectified this. Section 23 was as follows:

- No person shall without the written permission of the Postmaster-General, make, buy, sell, or have in his possession or under his control, any apparatus for the sending or receiving of messages by wireless telegraphy, or any apparatus intended to be used as a component part of such apparatus; and no person shall sell any such apparatus to any person who has not obtained such permission as aforesaid; and if any person contravenes the provisions of this Regulation, he shall be guilty of an offence against the Act.
- If the competent naval or military authority has reason to suspect that any person having in his possession any apparatus for sending or receiving messages by telegraphy, telephony, or other electrical or mechanical means, is using or about to use the same for any purpose prejudicial to the public safety or the defence of the Commonwealth, he may by order, prohibit that person from having, any such apparatus in his possession, and may take such steps as are necessary for enforcing the order; and if that person subsequently has in his possession any apparatus in contravention of the order, he shall be guilty of an offence against the Act.
- For the purposes of this Regulation, any apparatus ordinarily used as a distinctive component part of apparatus for the sending or receiving of messages by wireless telegraph, shall be deemed to be intended to be so used unless the contrary is proved.

Again the regulations were amended several times throughout the course of the war and subsequently.

A typical prosecution under the act and regulations was reported as follows: "Toy Wireless Apparatus; Hapless Owner Pilloried with Penalty of £15/15/-; Henry Albert Livermore, engineer, of 239 Nicholson street, was fined £10, with £5 5s costs, at Footscray Court on Thursday for having in his possession, contrary to the War Precautions Act, certain parts of a wireless telegraph apparatus. Wm. T. S. Crawford, Radio Inspector for the Mail Department, found in a shed at Livermore's place certain wireless apparatus customarily used by an amateur for demonstration purposes. It would be possible with the parts there to transmit messages for a distance of 100 yards, but not to receive them. The P.M. in imposing the fine, said the times were too serious to have wireless plant left lying round, and the penalty was just to emphasise the point that possession of wireless plant must be reported and a licence obtained. The P.M. excused defendant of any illicit dealing. Livermore had, further, to enter into a recognisance of £25 to comply with the regulations." No record has yet been identified of Livermore ever having held a wireless experimenter's licence.

==== AWA enemy part ownership ====
The AWA company was part-owned by Telefunken and upon declaration of war, shareholdings of all German-based firms were effectively quarantined. The degree of control over the company exercised by Fisk was greatly increased by this action. More than a decade would pass (long after cessation of hostilities) before ownership of these shares would be resolved.

==== Naval Wireless WW1 ====
The Australian Navy was already well advanced in its use of wireless telegraphy at the time of commencement of WW1. Additional ships were acquired and constructed and deployed in the war effort in unison with the British Navy, with principal deployments in the southwest Pacific. All vessels of any size or war capacity were fitted with wireless which now became indispensable. Australian wireless experimenters were welcome recruits as wireless officers and men, and served with particular distinction.

==== Military Wireless WW1 ====
The Australian military was not so well advanced in wireless as the Australian Navy, but quickly came up to speed in expanding the numbers of officers and men, as well as acquiring the necessary materials to equip several signals divisions. There were several campaigns, mostly in the Middle East, but the deployment to Mesopotamia was both prominent and noteworthy. As in the case of the Navy, Australian wireless experimenters were welcome recruits as wireless officers and men, and served with particular distinction.

==== Wireless Telegraphy Act 1915 ====
With the commencement of WW1, the government of the day desired to place all matters relating to wireless telegraphy under defence control while necessary. To this end the Wireless Telegraphy Act 1905 was amended to provide greater flexibility by replacing the delegation of powers specifically to the "Postmaster-General" to "the Minister for the time being administering the Act." Wireless Telegraphy Act 1915

==== Wireless control to Navy ====
Upon the amendment of the Wireless Regulations to transfer control of wireless from the Postmaster-General's Department to Department of Defence, the entire staff of the PMG's wireless section was transferred to Department of Navy.

==== Wireless Telegraphy Act 1919 ====
Again, while it appeared clear that the Constitution of the Commonwealth of Australia placed responsibility for wireless telephony with the Commonwealth, to remove any possible doubt, the Wireless Regulations of 1919 made explicit provision for this form of communication, recognising the increasing importance of the technology.

==== First taste of wireless telephony ====
Wireless regulation in Australia remained under the control of the Department of Navy after the close of World War I and licensing was very largely limited to shipping and coastal stations. Wireless telegraphy was almost universally employed for communication due to its efficiency and capacity for long-distance transmission. However, there are several reports of telephony transmissions, both music and speech, from international ships visiting Australian ports in the years immediately following World War I. Similarly, enterprising individuals at the coastal stations from time to time provided brief periods of music transmissions. While the equipment was designed for wireless telegraphy, modification to permit telephony was possible. The wireless operators on these ships and coastal stations were often also keen wireless experimenters in private life. The ships were visited by the land-based hams while in port and their equipment viewed in awe. The US in particular was years ahead of Australia in use of telephony and their wireless-equipped ships offered rare glimpses of the state of the art for Australian experimenters. At first the listening audience was restricted to other ships and coastal stations, but from 1920, private experimenters were licensed (for reception only).

==== Initial demonstrations of broadcasting ====
Much was made then (and still is) of the 13 August 1919 demonstration of wireless telephony by Ernest Fisk of AWA. "At a lecture on wireless communication before the industrial section of the Royal Society on Wednesday night, Mr. E. T. Fisk gave a remarkable demonstration of wireless telephony with the aid of an apparatus designed and manufactured in Sydney by the Amalgamated Wireless Company. A gramophone was played into a wireless telephone transmitter at the company's works in Clarence Street, and the music was received on a few wires strung along the wall in the Royal Society's lecture-room in Elizabeth Street. The music was clearly audible in all parts of the hall. The lecture was suitably closed with the audience standing while the National Anthem was played by wireless telephone."

==== Early concerts and amateur broadcasting ====
Following the successful public demonstrations of broadcasting by the AWA and others, the AWA commenced in 1921 a regular series of concerts that were widely heard all over Australia and laid a framework for the introduction of broadcasting in Australia. The handful of wireless experimenters licensed to transmit at the time also commenced regular and intermittent transmissions of speech and music. A number of amateurs commenced broadcasting music in 1920 and 1921. These included 2CM, Sydney; 2YG, Sydney; 2XY, Newcastle; 3ME, Melbourne; 3DP, Melbourne; 4CM, Brisbane; 4AE, Brisbane; 4CH, Brisbane; 5AC, Adelaide; 5AD, Adelaide (not associated with 5AD which commenced in 1930); 5BG, Adelaide; 7AA, Hobart; 7AB, Hobart. Many other amateurs soon followed. 2CM was run by Charles MacLuran who started the station in 1921 with regular Sunday evening broadcasts from the Wentworth Hotel, Sydney. 2CM is often regarded as Australia's first, regular, non-official station.

=== 1920s ===
==== Wireless Telegraphy Regulations 1920 ====
The Wireless Telegraphy Regulations 1920 finally made provision for Experimental Licences, though the Department of Navy remained reluctant to issue to all but a few.

==== Prominent experimenters ====
Florence Violet McKenzie

Oswald Francis Mingay

==== Amateur broadcasting ====
The government was under increasing pressure from businesses and amateurs, both to introduce higher power broadcasting in Australia and to relax licensing requirements for wireless experimenters. A way forward with high power broadcasting was problematic with the interests of numerous parties, particularly AWA, to be considered. The Wireless Regulations failed to address these but enabled ready broadcasting by wireless experimenters as an interim measure. During 1922 and 1923, a large number of experimenters were licensed and commenced to provide low power broadcasting to their local area. This partly satisfied the public's appetite for broadcasting, with the newspapers of the day carrying extensive coverage of the wireless boom taking place in the US and elsewhere. A number of amateurs commenced broadcasting music in 1920 and 1921. These included 2CM, Sydney; 2YG, Sydney; 2XY, Newcastle; 3ME, Melbourne; 3DP, Melbourne; 4CM, Brisbane; 4AE, Brisbane; 4CH, Brisbane; 5AC, Adelaide; 5AD, Adelaide (not associated with 5AD which commenced in 1930); 5BG, Adelaide; 7AA, Hobart; 7AB, Hobart. Many other amateurs soon followed.

==== Wireless Telegraphy Regulations 1922 ====
The Wireless Telegraph Regulations 1922 provided explicit provisions for a "Broadcasting" licence, but advertising was prohibited and there was no funding by government. While several experimenters took out such licences, costs were higher than the "Experimental" licences, and only the amateurs prepared to self fund a service with the intent of promoting the still-new science went down this path.

==== Wireless Telegraphy Regulations 1923 ====
The Wireless Telegraph Regulations 1923 introduced a funded broadcasting model for the first time.

==== The Sealed Set debacle ====
It was not until November 1923 when the government finally gave its approval for a number of officially recognised broadcast stations. These included (with the dates they came on air):

- 2SB, Sydney, Sydney Broadcasters Ltd, the first public radio station in Australia opened in Sydney at 8:00pm on 23 November 1923 (known as 2BL from 1 March 1924);
- 2FC, Sydney, Farmer & Co Ltd, 8 December 1923;
- 3AR, Melbourne, Associated Radio Co, 26 January 1924;
- 3LO, Melbourne, Broadcasting Co of Australia (call sign reminding of 2LO), 23 October 1924;
- 5MA, Adelaide, Millswood Auto and Radio Co., April 1924. Ceased in 1925.
- 6WF, Perth, Westralian Farmers, 4 June 1924.

All stations were to operate under a unique Sealed Set system under Broadcasting Regulations published in August 1923, where each receiving set was "sealed" and received the frequency of only one transmitting station. Part of an annual Licence fee for the set concerned was to go to the Federal Government, via the Postmaster-General's Department (PMG), with part of the money going to the broadcaster. Apart from extremely limited advertising, this was to be any broadcaster's only source of income.

From the outset problems with the system came to the fore. Many radio enthusiasts built their own sets, which could receive any or all of the stations, and the "sealed" receivers could be easily (although illegally) "modified".

The Sealed Set system was devised by broadcasting pioneer Ernest Fisk of AWA.

==== Wireless Telegraphy Regulations 1924 ====
The Wireless Telegraphy Regulations 1924

==== Class A & B Broadcasting ====
Radio stations in 1926 ( class A, class B)

As quickly as July 1924, the Sealed Set system was declared to be unsuccessful and it was replaced by a system of A Class and B Class stations. There were one or two A Class stations in each major market and these were paid for by a listener's licence fee imposed on all listeners-in. Five of the former Sealed Set stations became A Class stations, and were soon joined by the following stations in other State capitals:

- 5CL, Adelaide, Central Broadcasters Ltd, 20 November 1924;
- 7ZL, Hobart, Associated Radio Co, 17 December 1924;
- 4QG, Brisbane, Queensland Radio Service (operated by the Queensland government), 27 July 1925.

As from 1929, all A-Class stations received all their programs from the one source, the Australian Broadcasting Company which was made up of the following shareholders: Greater Union Theatres (a movie theatre chain), Fuller's Theatres (a live theatre chain) and J. Albert & Sons (music publishers and retailers).

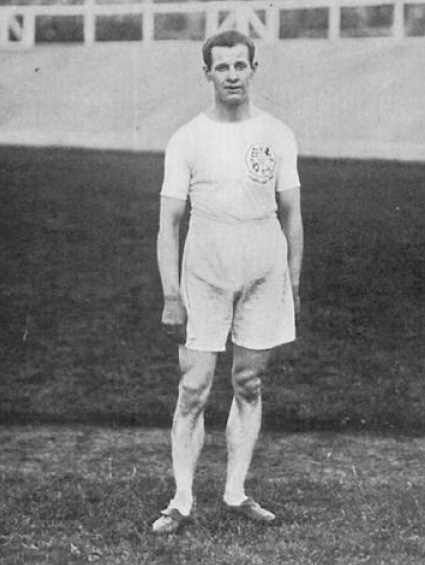
Emil Voigt, founder of 2KY on behalf of the Labor Council of New South Wales This photo was taken in earlier days when Voigt was a prominent British athlete.

A number of B Class stations were also licensed. These did not receive any government monies and were expected to derive their income from advertising, sponsorship, or other sources. Within a few years B Class stations were being referred to as "commercial stations". The following were the first to be licensed:

- 2BE, Sydney, Burgin Electric Company Ltd, 7 November 1924 (closed 6 November 1929);
- 3WR, Wangaratta, Wangaratta Sports Depot, 1 December 1924 (closed 22 December 1925 but later re-opened);
- 2EU, Sydney, Electrical Utilities Supply Co, 26 January 1925, still on the air – name changed to 2UE within months of opening;
- 2HD, Newcastle, H. A. Douglas, 27 January 1925, still on the air;
- 2UW, Sydney, Otto Sandel, 13 February 1925, still on the air;
- 5DN, Adelaide, 5DN Pty Ltd, 24 February 1925, still on the air;
- 3UZ, Melbourne, J. Oliver Nilsen & Co, 8 March 1925, still on the air;
- 4GR, Toowoomba, Gold Radio Electric Services, 9 August 1925, still on the air;
- 2KY, Sydney, Trades and Labour Council, 31 October 1925, still on the air;
- 2MK, Bathurst, Mockler Bros, 11 November 1925 (closed November 1931);
- 2GB, Sydney, Theosophical Broadcasting Service, 23 August 1926, still on the air.

Amateur broadcasters continued to operate in the long-wave and short-wave bands. In Melbourne, for some years, they were also permitted to broadcast on the medium-wave band on Sundays between 12:30 and 2:30 pm, during which time all commercial stations were required to close down.

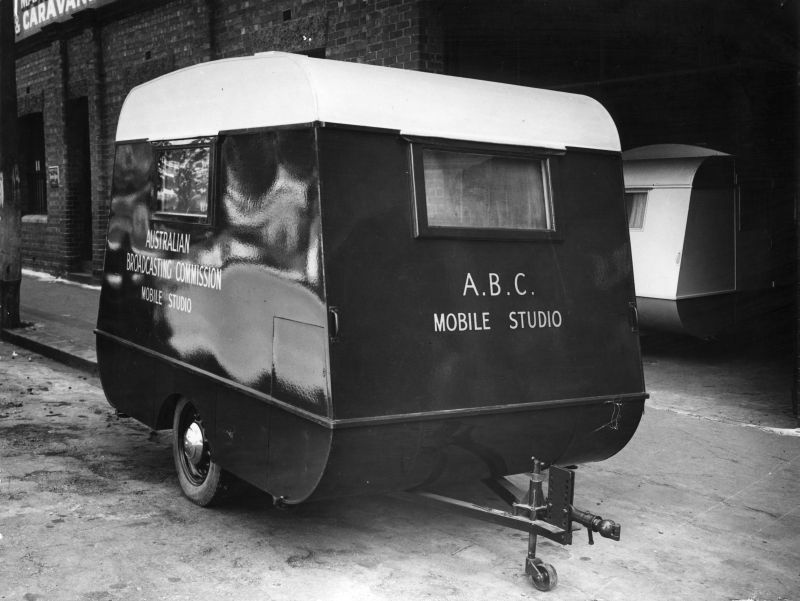
ABC mobile studio caravan, used for concerts presented by the ABC at army camps and other locations, 1940

A national service, the Australian Broadcasting Commission, was formed in July 1932, when the Australian Broadcasting Company's contract expired. The Corporation took over the assets of all A Class stations. It still exists as the Australian Broadcasting Corporation. The Australian Broadcasting Co changed its name to the Commonwealth Broadcasting Company and later the Australian Radio Network. It soon purchased Sydney commercial station 2UW and now has an Australia-wide network of commercial stations.

In the late 1920s and early 1930s, the PMG planned to institute C Class stations which would have had their advertising limited to the station owner(s) only. When the plan was abandoned in 1931, the PMG was about to issue such a licence to the Akron Tyre Co in Melbourne; in lieu of a C Class licence, Akron was given a licence for a B Class station but with a number of limiting conditions on its licence (see 3AK for details).

==== Mobile stations ====
Two of Australia's most unusual medium wave stations were mobile stations 2XT and 3YB. They both operated in eras prior to the universal establishment of rural radio stations. 2XT was designed and operated by AWA within the State of New South Wales, from a NSW Railways train, between November 1925 and December 1927. 2XT, which stood for experimental train, visited over 100 rural centres. Engineers would set up a transmitting aerial and the station would then begin broadcasting. This led to the further sales of AWA products.

3YB provided a similar service in rural Victoria between October 1931 and November 1935. Initially, the station operated from a Ford car and a Ford truck, but from 17 October 1932 they operated from a converted 1899 former Royal Train carriage. While the engineers were setting up the station's 50-watt transmitter in the town being visited, salesmen would sign up advertisers for the fortnight that 3YB would broadcast from that region. The station was on the air from 6:00 to 10:00 pm daily, and its 1,000-record library was divided into set four-hour programs, one for each of 14 days. In other words, the music broadcast from each town was identical. The station was operated by Vic Dinenny, but named after announcer Jack Young from Ballarat. On 18 January 1936, Dinenny set up 3YB Warrnambool, followed on 18 May 1937 by 3UL Warragul.

The passenger ship MV Kanimbla was the world's only ship designed with an inbuilt broadcasting station. Its callsign was 9MI. The broadcasting station operated for several months in 1939; it was run by Eileen Foley for AWA. 9MI's first official broadcast in April 1939 was made from the Great Australian Bight. The station broadcast on short wave, usually a couple of times per week, but many of its programs were relayed to commercial medium-wave stations that were also owned by AWA. Its broadcasting career ended when the war began in September 1939.

==== 1926 AM restack ====
In 1926 the broadcast planners of the PMGD co-ordinated a restack of the AM services with a view to increasing frequency separations between all services to enable better night-time reception.

==== Shortwave broadcasting ====
In the late 1920s, several Class A and Class B stations commenced shortwave broadcasting, simulcasting their AM programmes using experimental transmitters. Stations included 2FC, 2BL, 3AR, 3LO, 3UZ and 6WF. At the same time the PMG's Department established it experimental shortwave service VK3LR, while AWA commenced experimental transmissions using existing transmission sites (2ME, 3ME and 6ME).

==== Australian Broadcasting Company ====
Australian Broadcasting Company

==== Royal Commission 1927 ====
Royal Commission 1927

==== Imperial Wireless & Cable Conference ====
In 1928 the Imperial Wireless and Cable Conference was held in London. The conference was mainly to examine the competition which was occurring between Beam Wireless and Submarine Cable services. Principal outcome of the conference was a recommendation to merge both interests.

=== 1930s ===
==== National & commercial broadcasting ====
The National Broadcasting Service commenced in 1929. As each of the licences of the mostly struggling A-Class broadcasting services expired, they were not renewed. The Commonwealth of Australia acquired, by lease or purchase the transmission and studio facilities from each former licensee. These facilities were then operated by the Postmaster-General's Department. The government had contracted the Australian Broadcasting Company (a private entity, unrelated to the later Australian Broadcasting Commission) to supply the programming for these services. This contract expired in 1932 and was not renewed. While the regulatory framework for the B-Class stations changed little during this period. The stations had never been happy with the label B Class and from this time are increasingly referred to as commercial services.

==== 1930s National expansion ====
With the commencement of the National Broadcasting Service in 1929, the PMG's Department was initially focussed on effecting necessary maintenance to the network of transmitters and studios which they inherited from the former Class A licensees. It had been clear for some years that these licences would not be renewed by the government and level of financial compensation was not clear. As a consequence, perhaps with the exception of 4QG (operated by the Queensland state government), the facilities saw only a bare minimum of maintenance. While funding for future expansion of the transmission facilities of the NBS was limited (both for replacement of the former Class A facilities and establishment of additional NBS services), there was an expectation that this would change and preliminary work to identify new sites and appropriate antenna systems and transmission equipment commenced immediately.

==== 1930s Commercial expansion ====
Following a policy hiatus of some 4 years, the PMG's Department broadcast planners set out from 1930 to quench the demand for new services wherever frequencies were available. The timing was perfect as Australia began to emerge from the Great Depression and businesses with capital reserves and foresight or simply an enthusiasm for wireless broadcasting, presented their applications for a licence and declared their capabilities. The number of new services bought to air laid the framework of Australian broadcasting for the next 50 years. Not until the implementation of the various FM radio schemes in the 1990s and 2000s would Australia see as many new services. In terms of proportionate growth, it was unequalled.

==== 1935 AM restack ====
Prior to September 1935 a raster of channel allocations based upon multiples of 5 kHz progressively developed, but with the complex lattice of allocations implemented, the effective raster was 15 kHz. With the massive expansion of national and commercial services planned for the 1930s, the old raster would not have permitted satisfactory co-existence of the desired services. In the years prior to 1935, the regulator developed a plan based upon 10 kHz channel spacing, essentially identical to that which had been in use in North and South America (ITU Region 2).

==== Australia Calling ====
The PMG commenced a permanent international shortwave service "Australia Calling" using the former experimental transmitting system of VK3LR in the late 1930s. The facility was expanded and eventually was renamed "Radio Australia".

==== Cessation of amateur broadcasting ====
Ever since the commencement of the Wireless Regulations 1922, amateur services (then termed "experimental") had the right to broadcast music and speech. The commencement of high power Class A and Class B broadcasters in the mid-1920s saw a change in focus for listeners, but even in metropolitan areas there were only three or four high power services and amateur broadcasting provided greater, if mostly less professional, variety of programming. In the hiatus of broadcasting development of the late 1920s, amateur broadcasting in regional areas was often the sole source of programming. Such broadcasting was increasingly curtailed on medium wave from the 1930s and by 1939 was largely confined to shortwave, it continued to provide a variety of programming choice, especially in regional areas. With the commencement of WW2, all amateur transmission rights were withdrawn. Upon cessation of hostilities in 1946, amateur licensing was reinstated, but not the right to broadcast music and entertainment.

=== 1940s ===
==== Radio Australia ====
The PMG commenced a permanent international shortwave service "Australia Calling" using the former experimental transmitting system of VK3LR in the late 1930s. The facility was expanded and eventually was renamed "Radio Australia".

==== National security closures – commercial radio ====
In 1941 a number of commercial radio services were closed for alleged national security reasons.

==== Broadcasting and Television Act 1942 ====
The Broadcasting and Television Act was enacted in 1942.

==== Pacific Military Broadcasts ====
During and subsequent to WW2, the Australian military deployed many broadcasting stations for the entertainment of the troops in the field.

==== Amateur transmissions relicensed ====
In 1946 the PMG recommenced licensing of amateur transmissions. Notably, the privilege of transmitting music and entertainment was not reinstated. Similarly, the special privilege of operating in the AM radio band was no longer granted. It was felt that there were now sufficient national and commercial broadcasting services in operation throughout Australia, that amateur broadcasts served no great purpose.

==== 1948 AM restack ====
By 1948, AM transmitter powers in Australia and New Zealand had risen to a level where significant night-time skywave interference was being experienced. Meetings were held between the respective administrations and plans were developed to minimise interference by a partial restack of services in both countries. This was achieved through use of some clear channels for high power services and appropriate operating powers for close-spaced co-channel services. The restack was promptly effected and achieved its limited objective. In subsequent decades, use of directional antennas by Australia greatly minimised co-channel interference to New Zealand services.

==== FM broadcasting tests ====
In 1948, the government authorised test transmissions of FM broadcasting within the international FM radio band. These transmissions continued until the 1960s when the stations were all closed in preparation for the allocation of this band for TV broadcasting.

==== 1948 ABCB ====
The Australian Broadcasting Control Board was created in 1948 and for the first time portion of the planning of Australian broadcasting services was undertaken outside the PMG's Department.

=== 1950s ===
==== Increased power for commercial AM ====
Following establishment of the Australian Broadcasting Control Board in 1948, it was decided to focus the development of commercial radio services in Australia upon increasing the power and coverage of the existing services. During the 1950s the Sydney and Melbourne commercial services were permitted to increase power from typically 2 kW to 5 kW with modest coverage increases. Concurrently many regional commercial services, some with powers as low as 200 watts, through carefully planned sequences of frequency changes, were able to effect power increases to typically 2 kW.

==== ABC HF Inland Service ====
During the 1950s, the PMG's Department established a number of transmitting facilities at existing sites for the simulcasting of ABC programmes to outback areas remaining without adequate reception from the existing AM transmitter networks.

=== 1960s ===
==== 5kW for regional commercial radio ====
Prior to about 1970, essentially all Australian AM radio services were implemented using omnidirectional antennas. Where spectrum scarcity demanded close channel sharing arrangements, night-time skywave interference as controlled by requiring co-channel services to reduce power at night. This arrangement was less than satisfactory as differences in coverage were apparent. Many high-power National Broadcasting System antennas were replaced with an "anti-fading" design which, which minimised skywave radiation, easily distinguished by a "top hat" section resembling a wide flat umbrella. A small number of Australian AM radio services had been commissioned with directional antennas providing pattern minima towards co-channel services. This small deployment was quite effective and the increase in spectrum efficiency was dramatic. The ABCB announced in its Circular Letter B109 of 1975, a changed policy wherein existing services running 2 kW or less would be permitted to increase power to 5 kW, subject to the provision of a directional antenna. The majority of commercial AM radio services availed themselves of this option over the next decade.

=== 1970s ===
==== Department of the Media ====
The Department of the Media was one of several new Departments established by the Whitlam Government, a wide restructuring that revealed some of the new government's program. The department was dissolved shortly after the Dismissal. It was replaced by the Postal and Telecommunications Department, representing a joining of the Department of the Media and the Postmaster-General's Department. The department was an Australian Public Service department, staffed by officials who were responsible to the Minister for the Media, initially Doug McClelland (until June 1975), then Moss Cass (as part of a ministerial reshuffle in June 1975), and finally Reg Withers as a caretaker Minister for the month leading up to the December 1975 election (after the 11 November 1975 Dismissal in which the Governor-General appointed Leader of the Opposition, Malcolm Fraser, as caretaker Prime Minister). Department officials were headed by a Secretary, initially (acting in the position) Ebor Lane (until January 1973) and then James Oswin (from January 1973 to the end of 1975). Gough Whitlam had initially offered the Secretary position to Talbot Duckmanton in January 1973, but Duckmanton was uncertain what the department was supposed to do. After Oswin left the position in June 1975, he was replaced by James Spigelman, a 29-year-old who had previously been employed as the Prime Minister's Principal Private Secretary, the third person Whitlam had appointed as a Permanent Head of an Australian Government Department after time in that role.

==== Postal and Telecommunications Department ====
When the government disaggregated the behemoth Postmaster-General's Department in 1975 into the Australian Postal Commission and Australian Telecommunications Commission, the rump which remained responsible for policy development and regulatory functions including broadcasting planning became the Postal and Telecommunications Department.

==== Australian Broadcasting Tribunal ====
The Broadcasting and Television Amendment Act (No. 2) 1976 abolished the Australian Broadcasting Control Board and created the Australian Broadcasting Tribunal. All powers and responsibilities under the Broadcasting and Television Act 1942 were transferred from the Board to the Tribunal with the exception of the planning and engineering functions associated with broadcasting services, which became the responsibility of the Postal and Telecommunications Department.

The Broadcasting and Television Amendment Act (No. 2) 1976 provided for the appointment of a chairman, a vice-chairman and three Members for periods of up to five years. On 23 December 1976, the Minister announced the appointments for three years of Mr Bruce Gyngell as chairman, Mr James H. Oswin as vice-chairman, and Mrs Janet Strickland as a Member, to become effective as from 1 January 1977. The Act also provided for the appointment of up to six Associate Members.

Associate Members may be appointed for the purposes of the Tribunal's functions relating to public inquiries. No Associate Members had been appointed as at October 1977.

The Tribunal commenced operations on 4 January 1977, utilising premises previously occupied by the Postal and Telecommunications Department at 153 Walker Street, North Sydney.

==== Early community radio ====
In the mid-1970s, the government was preparing to embark on a new class of broadcasting, being community-based. Due to restrictions under the Broadcasting Act 1942, these stations were licensed under the Wireless Telegraphy Act 1905 as experimental services using frequencies immediately above the AM radio bands (the band now used by MF-NAS services).

==== Cass' dirty dozen ====
Continuing pressure to increase access to broadcasting by community groups, led the then Minister for Media to again utilise the Wireless Telegraphy Act 1905 to license 12 such groups with transmission frequencies in both the AM radio and FM radio band. As there was some doubt that such licensing was valid under the WT Act, given the specifics of the Broadcasting Act 1942, these 12 stations were frequently labelled by the incumbent commercial broadcasters as "Cass' dirty dozen". However, the new community broadcasters adopted the label with pride.

==== 1975 Radio 4ZZ ====
Community radio station 4ZZ, now 4ZZZ, became Australia's first FM station, commencing transmission on 8 December 1975.

==== 1978 AM restack ====
The Australian government participated in a number of Regional Broadcasting Conferences which concluded with it signing the 1975 Regional Broadcasting Agreement in 1975. The plan commenced on 23 November 1978. Its principal feature was a raster of 9 kHz channel spacings compared to the 10 kHz plan which had prevailed in Australia since 1935, in line with international standards. As a consequence there were 12 additional channels available for allocation in Australia with but small increase in adjacent channel interference. Together with the increased spectrum opportunities provided use of AM directional antennas, a significant number of new services were able to be introduced, satisfying to some extent, the rapidly increasing demand for new services which ultimately could only be satisfied by the release of the FM radio band for broadcasting purposes.

==== Radio 2JJ ====
The Australian Broadcasting Commission commenced its youth radio service in 1975 utilising a standby transmitter at the PMG's Department Liverpool AM transmission facility. With a modest power, higher frequency allocation and noisy radio environment, coverage was limited to a portion of the Sydney metropolitan area. The allocated callsign was 2JJ, but in an early usage of on-air identifiers it was soon announced as simply Double J. The service was immediately popular and demand for better coverage and transmission quality was strong. In one of the earliest examples of AMFM conversion in Australia, the station was authorised to convert to the FM radio band in 1980, together with high power and full metropolitan coverage. The callsign became 2JJJ and the on-air identifier just Triple J. Popularity continued to soar and the program stream was deployed to new FM transmitters in the capital cities in 1989 (Tranche 2), then many regional areas in the early 1990s (Tranche 3). As the ABC's focus became increasingly content creation, further extension of the network by the ABC itself has ceased, but the network continues significant expansion throughout Australia by means of privately funded retransmission licences (enabled by the BSA92). In newly established mines, a Triple J FM transmitter to entertain the community is often the first choice for establishment.

==== Radio 3ZZ ====
Circa 1975, a station Radio 3ZZ with on-air identifier of Access Radio was licensed in Melbourne with a brief to give voice to the disenfranchised in the broadcasting industry. Its closure some years later caused public uproar, but the concurrent expansion of the community radio sector was equally as effective as 3ZZ.

==== Initial translator licences ====
The Broadcasting Act 1942 made no provision for radio subsidiary licences. In order to bring translator stations to air in a timely manner, the Australian Broadcasting Tribunal had no alternative but to license transmitters for small regions as separate stations. Following amendments to the Act, all commercial station licences were converted to New System licences with an associated defined Service Area, and where translator licences had previously been granted, these licence were brought within the main station licence.

=== 1980s ===
==== Department of Communications ====
In 1980 the government renamed the Postal and Telecommunications Department as Department of Communications to reflect its broader role in the media.

==== Community radio ====
From 1980, numerous community radio services were licensed. Initially these were mostly on the AM radio band, but increasingly FM band allocations were made in gaps within the Band II TV services.

==== FM commercial radio ====
From 1980, the first commercial radio services were licensed, initially in the capital cities, then later in the regional areas.

==== AM stereo ====
From the late 1970s, the Australian regulator had been closely following developments in the US, Britain and Europe, as to the various competing AM radio stereophonic broadcasting technologies. Commercial FM radio in Australia was still nascent and the commercial AM radio incumbents had not yet awoken to the great threat to their viability that FM radio would play in the future. But with the implementation of the Geneva Plan in late 1978, AM channel spacing had been reduced from 10 kHz to 9 kHz, with some potential loss of fidelity in terms of audio bandwidth. All the AM stereo systems under investigation offered not just stereo reproduction but also wider audio bandwidth receivers. The US's FCC chose not to select a particular AM stereo technology, but rather approve a number of systems and let the market decide. Australia did not follow that path and selected a particular system. Sadly, sales of AM stereo receivers in Australia were minuscule. Australian AM stations did deploy the technology for the next decade, but this seemed mainly to be able to promote the theory rather than the practice. Most AM stereo exciters had been switched off by 2000 and none are now operating.

==== Service areas – commercial and community radio ====
Commencing in the mid-1980s, the Department of Communications reviewed all commercial and community radio stations in Australia in consultation with individual stations and neighbouring services. Service areas (now Licence Areas) were determined for every commercial and community radio (and commercial TV) service.

==== Supplementary commercial FM in regional areas ====
It was considered by the government of the day that in many areas then served by only one commercial radio service (on AM), the introduction of an additional and independent commercial FM service would result in economic viability issues for one or both of the services. When initially announced in 1980, the scheme was to apply to both commercial radio and commercial television services. But by the time of commencement in 1985, the program was available for commercial radio services only. Solus regional commercial radio operators were invited to apply for supplementary FM licences and most did so. However the scheme quickly became mired in litigation as prospective independent licensee contested the economic viability assessments. By the time the process was concluded by the commencement of the Broadcasting Services Act 1992, only a handful of supplementary licences had been issued.

==== Department of Transport and Communications ====
In 1987 the government merged the Department of Communications with the Department of Transport and Department of Aviation into the super-Department of Transport and Communications. This merger was with a view to a broader deregulatory agenda which ultimately resulted in the Broadcasting Services Act 1992.

==== New system licensing – commercial & community radio ====
Following amendments to the Act, all commercial and community radio licences were converted to New System licences with an associated defined Service Area, and where translator licences had previously been granted, these licences were brought within the main station licence.

==== ABC second regional radio network ====
During the 1980s the government funded a vast expansion of the ABC regional radio network. During the late 1930s, second ABC radio services in the metropolitan areas with the two networks being labelled simply Radio 1 and Radio 2. But in regional areas there was typically only a single radio services which usually transmitted an amalgam of Radio 1 and Radio 2.

==== ABC Parliamentary News Network, tranche 1 ====
Circa 1990, a few services were established in metropolitan areas, but spectrum scarcity initially precluded a fuller deployment and coverage limitations.

==== AM–FM conversion, tranche 1 ====
The existing licensees in commercial radio industry had been discontent with the auctioning of FM licences to new industry players. In 1988, the government announced the National Metropolitan Radio Plan 1988, which allowed for a limited number of metropolitan AM commercial to bid at auction for the right to convert their operation to FM. Recognising the national strategic importance of the AM transmission facilities of these services, a feature of the plan, was an independent valuation of the AM facilities, which were then acquired by the commonwealth and used primarily for provision of Radio for the Print Handicapped services and Parliamentary broadcasting.

=== 1990s ===
==== ABC Parliamentary News Network, tranche 2 ====
In the early 1990s the network was fully deployed to all metropolitan areas, using AM channels and often transmission facilities released by the first tranche of AM–FM conversions.

==== AM–FM conversion, tranche 2 ====
Planning of the second tranche of AM–FM conversions for commercial AM services was effected within a framework of a schedule of prices for the right to convert and was widely adopted within its target services. The process was not available to metropolitan commercial services and solus commercial operators were in the middle of the Supplementary FM scheme, but many of these target services availed themselves of a process which involved modest cost and minimal intervention.

==== Broadcasting Services Act 1992 ====
With a breadth and scope the BSA92 quietly transformed all aspects of the Australian broadcasting system which had slowly evolved over the 70 years since the Wireless Regulations of 1922. The Australian regulator changed its agenda from detailed planning of all aspects of each stations operation to a lighter touch which looked more towards managing mutual interference between services.

==== Radiocommunications Act 1992 ====
The Radiocommunications Act 1992 was enacted in 1992.

==== Australian Broadcasting Authority ====
The Australian Broadcasting Authority was created under the Broadcasting Services Act 1992 and assumed the functions and staff of the Australian Broadcasting Tribunal

==== Temporary community broadcasting licences ====
Prior to the BSA92, a framework for licensing aspirant community broadcasters had been in place, but the process had been formalised under the BSA92 and comprehensive guidelines were soon developed and implemented.

==== Special events ====
Prior to the BSA92, a framework for special event licensing had been in place, but the process had been formalised under the BSA92 and comprehensive guidelines were soon developed and implemented.

==== Narrowband area services ====
Prior to the BSA92, a framework for Narrowband Area Services licensing had been in place as Limited Broadcasting Licences, but the process had been formalised under the BSA92 and comprehensive guidelines were soon developed and implemented.

==== Low-power open narrowcasting ====
Prior to the BSA92, a framework for Low Power Open Narrowcasting Services licensing had been in place as Limited Broadcasting Licences, but the process had been formalised under the BSA92 and comprehensive guidelines were soon developed and implemented.

==== Domestic HF broadcasting ====
The broadcasting privileges for amateur radio operators prior to commencement of WW2, were not restored following conclusion of hostilities. After some 50 years, private broadcasting was effectively reintroduced with BSA92. A careful framework was introduced and numerous licences issued, but lifetimes appear brief and support remains weak.

==== Private international HF broadcasting ====
The BSA92 made provision for licensing of private entities to broadcast internationally from Australian soil.

==== Digital radio (DAB) testing ====
Commencing in the early 1990s, the Department of Communications conducted extensive studies into DAB digital radio, followed by a number of comprehensive field tests. The studies and tests were conducted by the Departments Communications Laboratory.

==== National Transmission Agency ====
In the early 1990s, the government established the National Transmission Agency, bringing together national broadcast planners from the Department of Transport and Communications and transmission engineers from Telstra Broadcasting. The agency was to oversight the planning and operation of the National Broadcasting Service with a view to creating a discrete entity and cost centre more amenable to sale of the National Transmission Network.

==== s39 FM commercial services ====
The new section 39 of the BSA92 was similar in intent to the Supplementary FM radio scheme. However a simplified regulatory framework was adopted which largely obviated the litigation of the former scheme. There was a short window of opportunity for solus commercial licensees in regional markets to apply for an additional "s39" commercial FM licence. Most qualified licensees availed themselves of the opportunity and in less than a year some 69 such services were licensed and most commenced operations within a very few months.

==== 1993 planning priorities ====
In accordance with the BSA92, the new ABA embarked upon a massive first principles review of Australian broadcasting needs in the context of significant deregulation. There was considerable public consultation which was reflected in the final report which laid out a framework for establishing new radio services, region by region. The framework was very largely adhered to over the next decade.

==== Licence area planning ====
Following on from the 1993 Planning Priorities report, the ABA commenced a program of public consultation, region by region resulting in the determination of Licence Area plans for each Australian broadcasting market.

==== ABC Triple J network ====
During the late 1980s and 1990s, the government funded a massive expansion of the ABC's Triple J network using the FM band exclusively and extending to all capital cities and larger regional areas.

==== AM–FM conversion, tranche 3 ====
During the 1990s there were no further commercial FM AM–FM conversions, however, most of the AM community radio services elected to convert to FM during this period while the ABC chose to convert a number of their regional services where considered suitable.

==== Narrowcasting, tranche 1 ====
As the first and second tranches of AM–FM conversion were effected, the vacated AM channels which were not required by the government for Parliamentary broadcasting services were made available on an interim basis to various narrowcasters, mostly racing radio services.

==== Narrowcasting, tranche 2 ====
Commencing from the mid-1990s, a very large number of vacated AM channels and newly planned FM radio channels were released through a price-based allocation process. This scheme continues to the present, as additional channels are made available through Licence Area Plan variations in response to expressed interest by prospective licensees.

==== Sale of National Transmission Network ====
By the late 1990s, the National Transmission Agency had closely integrated all the former national broadcast planners from the Department of Transport and Communications and the former transmission engineers from Telstra Broadcasting. The oversight by the agency over several years had created a single discrete entity and cost centre for the National Broadcasting Service. A public Request for Tender on the National Transmission Network was made and a sale negotiated. The successful tenderer was NTL Australia. NTA staff were given the option of transferring to NTL Australia, those who did not avail themselves of the option generally were placed in other positions within the ABA. The sale concluded almost 70 years of public ownership of the National Broadcasting Service which had commenced in 1929 with the purchase by the Commonwealth of Australia of the first Class A broadcasting services.

=== 2000s ===
==== ABC Parliamentary News Network, tranche 3 ====
In the mid-2000s, the government funded a major expansion of the ABC's Parliamentary News Network to all population centres in excess of 10,000 persons, almost all of which utilised channels in the FM radio band.

==== Australian Communications and Media Authority ====
The Australian Communications and Media Authority was formed in 2005, commencing on 1 July 2005, by the merger of the former Australian Broadcasting Authority and the former Australian Communications Authority.

==== Digital radio in capital cities ====
Australia was one of the first countries to undertake tests of digital radio. Extensive tests were undertaken of the DAB system at 1.5 GHz in the early 1990s. The Australian policy framework slowly evolved with a number of published studies and policy analyses. There was recognition that only capital city markets would be economically viable for the new medium while digital receiver penetration slowly ramped up. These services commenced in July 2009 using channels within the Band III TV band. A significant deployment of digital on-channel repeaters has been effected in recent years to in-fill coverage gaps both within and at the periphery of their coverage areas.

==== FM radio RDS ====
Prior to the commencement of permanent digital radio in Australia, there had been very limited use of the Radio Data System. Unlike in Europe where inclusion of RDS technology in FM receivers, this had never been mandated in Australia. The few stations which modified their FM radio transmitters to include the RDS signal in the multiplex, mostly made only limited use of the RDS specification to transmit a textual version of their callsign and / or on-air identifier. With the availability of digital radio receivers, there was real concern as to listeners at the periphery of the digital radio coverage area transitioning to the wider FM radio coverage. The RDS specification had always offered automatic and relatively seamless transition between the two. Capital city FM radio operators quickly deployed RDS within their transmitters. As digital radio deployments commence deployment in regional areas, RDS is expected to become ubiquitous.

=== 2010s ===
==== AM–FM conversion, tranche 4 ====
Planning is currently well advanced on conversion of many of the remaining AM services in solus regional commercial markets to the FM radio band. The first such station to convert was 6NW Port Hedland which commenced its FM service in December 2017 and ceased its simulcast with the AM service in January 2018.

==== Digital radio in regional & remote markets ====
Planning is currently well advanced on the establishment of digital radio services in regional and remote markets. Trials in Canberra and Darwin have been underway for some years.

==== Closure of Radio Australia shortwave ====
In 2017, the ABC concluded terrestrial international shortwave transmission with the closure of its sole remaining transmitter site at Shepparton. The action remains controversial.

== Regulatory topics ==
The foregoing regulatory chronology details, decade by decade, specific regulatory developments in broadcasting and the results of those regulations in terms of deployment of new services. However, some topics, once established progressively evolve over many decades and these are discussed in the following.

=== Wireless systems ===
Prior to the early 1910s there were numerous differing systems of wireless telegraphy developed. Drivers for this development included not only improvements in the technology but also a strong element of attempting to identify a technology sufficiently different from the core Marconi system to permit the avoidance of royalty payments to Marconi. Interoperability was perceived as an important issue, with incompatibilities arising out of technological issues as well as operational policies. The key systems that had a presence (or attempted presence) in Australia were:

- Marconi system
- Lodge-Muirhead system
- Telefunken system
- Shoemaker system
- de Forest system
- Balsillie system

=== Call signs ===
Call signs were introduced in 1920 and, with minor refinements, exist in the same form today. All stations have an alphanumeric; the defining numeral is followed by two letters to form a call sign that is unique to each station. The numeral defines the state or territory in which the station is sited. Originally, the following were used: 2 = New South Wales (and originally Australian Capital Territory); 3 = Victoria; 4 = Queensland; 5 = South Australia (and originally Northern Territory); 6 = Western Australia; 7 = Tasmania. The letters often defined the station ownership (e.g.: 2HD = Harry Douglas; 3DB = Druleigh Business College; 5CL = Central Broadcasters Limited) or geographic region (e.g.: 3WR = WangaRatta; 4MK = MacKay; 7HO = HObart), but in other cases the letters had no specific meaning. Over the years, the following numerals were added: 1 = Australian Capital Territory (but earlier stations still retain their "2" call sign); 8 = Northern Territory; 9 = military stations during World War II, and later for New Guinea, and Papua – then there's 9MI which doesn't really fit into any category (see below under "Mobile Stations"); 0 = Australian Antarctic Territory.

Australia's postcodes, introduced in 1967, use the same introductory numeral as radio call signs.

There is an urban myth that call signs were based on Australian military districts but this incorrect, as the following list of military districts show: 1 = Queensland; 2 = New South Wales; 3 = Victoria; 4 = South Australia; 5 = Western Australia; 6 = Tasmania; 7 = Northern Territory; 8 = New Guinea, and Papua.

Today, with minor exceptions, AM stations retain the two letters after the numeral, and since 1975 FM stations have had three letters. Over the last few decades, there has been a trend for many stations to use marketing names on air rather than their official call sign. Inter alia, examples of such on-air names are: Gold, Mix, HOTFM, Nova, and STAR FM. Stations will often change their marketing name even when there is just a small change in format.

=== Spectrum ===
==== AM radio ====
1920s all broadcast services allocated to a few specific frequencies, MF + LF

early 1920s Class A Services low end of AM band & longwave, Class B services upper end of band, Amateurs above 1400? kHz

mid 1920s AWA-influenced longwave services commenced to be switched off due to difficulties in achieving radiator efficiency

late 1920s Australia commences to allocate AM radio services in the range between 1400 kHz and 1500 kHz

1926 AM restack

1930 Captain Eckersley and Radio Research Board give consideration to widespread deployment of longwave services, but eventually it is decided not to proceed

1935 AM restack and 10 kHz spacing plan

1938 Following Cairo conference, the upper limit of the broadcast band was extended from 1500 kHz to 1600 kHz, however most consumer receivers were unable to tune this range and it was many years before the PMG planners were prepared to allocate these frequencies

1948 AM restack

1978 9 kHz spacing plan

==== FM radio ====
1948 First use of the international FM broadcast band for test transmissions by the NBS. These tests were semi-permanent in nature and only switched off in the early 1960s in preparation for introduction of TV services into Band II

1965 UHF band was allocated to FM radio services but policy continued to be reviewed and there were no services deployed.

1975 Decision was made to cease deployments of new TV services using Band II and to progressively convert existing services to Band III and Band IV. Remaining gaps in Band II would be used for new FM radio services

1980s Phase I of Band II TV clearance

1990s Phase II of Band II TV clearance

2000 Decision not to proceed with further Band II TV clearance

2009 Last band II TV service switches off with the completion of transition to Digital TV in Australia which makes no provision for use of Band II

=== External territories ===
==== Australian Antarctic Territory ====
Walter Henry Hannam 1912 (see also Macquarie Island)

Sidney Jeffryes 1913

Francis Howard Bickerton After Jeffryes succumbed to polar madness

Wireless telegraphy was first established on Antarctica at Cape Denison, Adelie Land, in 1912 as part of the Australasian Antarctic Expedition. The callsign allocated by the PMG Department was MAL, which was a duplicate with that for the SS Liguria of the Navigazione Generale Italiana (such duplication was common prior to implementation of the 1912 London agreement).

==== Coral Islands ====
Willis Island in the Willis Islets was utilised as a meteorological observation station even prior to wireless telegraphy development. Coastal shipping deposited and retrieved observers for annual stints at this lonely outpost off the northern Queensland coastline.

Wireless equipment was first deployed in the 1910s around the time of the establishment of the coastal station network. An already valuable station, it became invaluable with the ability to communicate weather observations of approaching cyclones which would subsequently directly impact the northern Queensland coast.

In later years, many of the observer / operators were licensed radio amateurs and there is at least one instance recorded of one of the "hams" conducting broadcasts.

==== Macquarie Island ====
Wireless telegraphy was first established at Macquarie Island in 1912 as part of the Australasian Antarctic Expedition. The callsign allocated by the PMG Department was MQI, which was a duplicate with that for the SS Saxon of the Union-Castle Line (such duplication was common prior to implementation of the 1912 London agreement). Following implementation of the agreement, the callsign was changed to VIQ. Practical equipment of the day was not capable of a direct link between the main base at Cape Denison on the Antarctic mainland and their Hobart main base. Mawson decided to establish an intermediate station at Macquarie Island primarily to relay messages between Cape Denison and Hobart (VIH), but also to originate its own messages. Walter Henry Hannam oversighted the construction and commissioning of the Macquarie Island station, then left the facility in charge of Charles Albert Sandell, in accordance with Expedition plans. Much to his chagrin, the Macquarie station proved effective from the start and continued so, while the Cape Denison station in its first year was problematic at best. The meteorological data from Macquarie was considered so important that upon the relief of the two expedition wireless operators in 1914, the Department of Meteorology provided two further operators to continue the data gathering a further year.

==== Nauru ====
Refer to History of wireless telegraphy and broadcasting in Nauru and History of wireless telegraphy and broadcasting in Australia#Nauru for further detail

During the wireless era, island country of Nauru saw a variety of colonial rulers. It was annexed by Germany in 1888 and incorporated into her Marshall Islands protectorate. Following the outbreak of World War I, the island was captured by Australian troops in 1914. The Nauru Island Agreement made in 1919 between the governments of the United Kingdom, Australia and New Zealand provided for the administration of the island and for working of the phosphate deposits by an intergovernmental British Phosphate Commission (BPC). The terms of the League of Nations Mandate were drawn up in 1920, but it was not till 1923, the League of Nations gave Australia a trustee mandate over Nauru, with the United Kingdom and New Zealand as co-trustees. Japanese troops occupied Nauru in mid-1942. The Japanese garrison surrendered to Australian troops in September 1945. In 1947, a trusteeship was established by the United Nations, with Australia, New Zealand, and the United Kingdom as trustees. Nauru became self-governing in January 1966, and following a two-year constitutional convention it became independent in 1968.

=== Newspaper columns ===
The early days of radio were characterised by intense public interest which was reflected in extensive coverage city and regional newspapers. Particularly in the cities, but occasionally in the larger regional centres, this often led to regular weekly columns devoted specifically to radio. These columns often attracted large followings. Mostly the columnists used pseudonyms and many of them remain unidentified to this day.

In Trove, sponsored by the National Library of Australia, is one of the world's most extensive digital collections of Newspapers. This has allowed unprecedented ready access to this material.

=== Wireless exhibitions ===
While wireless technology was in its infancy, promotional exhibitions were conducted to progress the industry. In the late 1900s and early 1910s, these were mainly a small part of larger industrial exhibitions, displaying the wares of Australian, British and US commerce and the handiwork of private experimenters (which often outclassed the commercial goods). By the 1920s interest had reached a level where entire exhibitions were devoted to wireless and immediately prior and subsequent to the commencement of high power broadcasting, interest reached fever pitch. Throughout the 1920s, the state divisions of the Wireless Institute of Australia played at least major part in most exhibitions. Commercial broadcasting interests were particularly supportive of the exhibitions, as each new set sold meant one more broadcast listener's licence issued by the Postmaster-General's Department, a portion of the fee for which was allocated to the local licensee. Even the PMG itself was not a disinterested party. While the listener's licence fees went to consolidated revenue, the results were widely reported to the newspapers alongside the relative amounts which the department was allocated which included from 1929 the costs for the transmission and studio facilities of the National Broadcasting Service.

== Related Wikipedia articles ==
=== Australia ===
- AWA (the ubiquitous company with major impact upon the first five decades of broadcasting in Australia)
- Call signs in Australia (comprehensive discussion of callsigns for all services, structure a little confusing)
- Australian Broadcasting Company (best known as the contractor for provision of programming to the National Broadcasting Service 1929–1932)
- Australian Broadcasting Corporation (overview of our national broadcaster, mostly current, minimal history)
- History of the Australian Broadcasting Corporation (more detailed history of the ABC)
- List of Australian AM radio stations (still a work in progress but records the many frequency changes for AM services over a century)
- List of people in communications and media in Australia (former section of this article)
- List of radio stations in Australia (comprehensive, mostly current services, but some historical, includes AM, FM, Digital, Narrowcast)
- Media of Australia (brief overview only, another work in progress)
- Newspapers in Australia (brief overview only, another work in progress)
- Radio broadcasting in Australia (material about current radio broadcasting and programming)
- Television broadcasting in Australia (comprehensive overview of current licensing & systems, minimal technology/history/development)
- Timeline of Australian radio (many errors and much trivia given prominence, but also much potential)

=== International/Technology ===
- History of broadcasting
- History of radio
- History of telecommunication (excellent polished discussion of all communications technology categories)
- History of television (excellent discussion of the technology, no material yet about Australia)
- Invention of radio
- Wireless telegraphy (discussion of the three types of "Telegraphy without Wires")

=== Programs ===
- Argonauts Club, the ABC's iconic children's session
- Australia's Amateur Hour
- Blue Hills, radio serial
- Boyer Lectures, annual ABC series of prestige lectures
- Carols by Candlelight, annual presentation originally organised for broadcasting
- The Castlereagh Line, radio serial
- Consider Your Verdict, radio drama (later TV drama)
- D24, radio drama
- Dad and Dave, radio comedy/drama serial
- Football Inquest, Melbourne-based Australian rules football program
- Give it a Go, quiz program
- Information Please, refer to Overseas section
- It Pays to Be Funny, quiz program
- Meet the Press, political interview program
- Music for Pleasure, ABC classical music program
- One Man's Family, refer to Overseas section
- The Oxford Show, variety program
- Pick a Box, quiz program
- The Pressure Pak Show, quiz program
- Quiz Kids, Australian version of a US panel show
- Singers of Renown, ABC program featuring classical singers
- When a Girl Marries, refer to Overseas section
- Yes, What?, radio comedy series
