= Henry Walter Jenvey =

Senior public servant (1851–1932)

Henry Walter Jenvey (7 February 1851 – 14 July 1932) was an Australian senior public servant, initially with the Victorian Post Office and following Federation, the federal Postmaster-General's Department. He was heavily involved in the development of Victoria's telegraphy and telephony networks, and subsequently their integration into those of the Commonwealth. One of Australia's earliest wireless experimenters, he could reasonably be described as Australia's first amateur radio operator, since the majority of his experiments was self-funded and in his private time.

== Professional career ==
=== Telegraph Electrical Society ===
In August 1874, Jenvey was a founding member of the Victorian Telegraph Electrical Society and was in the initial committee of management together with contemporaries Smibert, McGaurin and Mickle. Membership was restricted to employees of the Victorian Postal Department as their meeting and experimental room was provided by the department. Jenvey was a driving force behind the society. After only three months the membership was already 89 persons and papers had been read by all the luminaries of the wireless section. Monthly meeting were held in the Athenaeum and papers were presented which addressed the cutting edge of telegraphy and telephony technology at the time. The society was dormant for two years from 1888, but was reformed in 1890 with Jenvey as president. The society was eventually renamed the Victorian Electrical Society.

=== Wireless experiments ===
In late 1896, Henry Walter Jenvey, in explaining "Telegraphy without Wires" to the press, refers only to the leakage and inductive methods. But soon afterwards, he himself was actively engaged in the electromagnetic method. In 1899, his lectures had been extended to include Marconi's system. The successful experiments by Walker in Sydney in August 1899 prompted Jenvey to reveal that for some weeks he had been exchanging messages between the General Post Office and the Telephone exchange at Willis Street, a distance of a half mile. The first message to grace the airwaves of Melbourne was "Long reign Duffy" referring to the then Postmaster-General for Victoria. By 1900 he was reporting that an experimental network of wireless stations had been established at the Observatory, Wilson Hall at the university and the General Post Office. As part of the Congress of the Association for the Advancement of Science, on 12 January 1900, Jenvey presented a lecture on the current state of wireless telegraphy in the world at the Wilson Hall of the University of Melbourne. At the conclusion of the lecture, he then sent a request from his station erected in the hall and received in return the word "Melbourne" from his station in the tower of the General Post Office. Jenvey continued his experiments throughout 1900, with regular stations established at Heidelberg and Doncaster. From April 1901, efforts concentrated on Point Ormond, Port Phillip Bay and a station was established with a 155 ft. pole near the shoreline, to take advantage of the better propagation over salt water. From Point Ormond, communication was soon established with Point Cook, a distance of 10 miles, by means of a kite-borne aerial at the latter location. The timing of this extension of transmission distance for Jenvey's apparatus was sublime. The Duke and Duchess of Cornwall and York were to visit Australia to participate in the celebrations of Federation. Jenvey sought and obtained permission from Senator Drake, the Postmaster-General, to erect a facility at Queenscliff to send greetings to the royal party as they approached Port Phillip Bay. In the first week of May, a large tent was erected on the recreation reserve near the fort and the equipment installed. On Sunday evening 5 May 1901, news was received at Queenscliff that the R.M.S. Ophir was off Split Point and the message of greeting was sent. No reply was received, but it was later confirmed that the message was received by the escorting ships, but the absence of a Naval code precluded a response. While the convoy was in port, Jenvey established contact with Lieutenant Trousdale, R.N., of the warship HMS St George and messages were then regularly exchanged with the Point Ormond station. When most of the convoy departed on 18 May, Jenvey exchanged messages with the St. George on the initial part of her journey. The last message received from the St. George was at a distance of 37 miles, a record for Australia which would stand for some years. He continued his experiments throughout the 1900s, but prioritised the essential work of developing and integrating the telegraphic and telephonic networks of the fledgling Commonwealth.

=== Postal Commission 1908 ===
Jenvey gave evidence on a number of occasions at the Postal Commission 1908.

== Late life and legacy ==
Jenvey retired from the Postmaster-General's Department in 1910 after 40 years of service. Jenvey passed 14 July 1932 at his home in Carnegie, at age 81 years, with but brief mention of his enduring life's work. His son William Walter Jenvey followed in his father's footsteps and was licensed as an amateur radio operator from the 1920s. Callsigns allocated between 1925 and 1961 were 3AY, VK3AY, VK2YJ and VK2ZO. William was active in a number of Melbourne amateur radio societies in the early 1920s.

A plaque has been erected at Fort Queenscliff to commemorate the 6 May 1901 greetings sent by Jenvey to the Royal Visitors. It reads as follows: On 6 May 1901, from near the Black Lighthouse, an address of welcome to the Duke and Duchess of Cornwall and York arriving by ship to open the first Federal parliament was successfully transmitted by H. W. Jenvey, MIEE, electrical engineer, Victorian Postal Department using equipment he designed, built and operated. This was the first Australian shore to ship wireless telegraph communication except for pre-arranged experiments.'online

== Artifacts ==
- Museums Victoria Jenvey's Coherer, used for communication with St. George, 1901 Museums Victoria
- Museums Victoria Telegram from Jenvey to Chambers, advising major improvement in signals, 1900 Museums Victoria

== Publications ==
- Jenvey, H. W. Practical telegraphy : a guide for the use of officers of the Victorian Post and Telegraph Department. vol. 1 (2nd edition Melbourne, 1891) Trove
- Jenvey, H. W. Practical telegraphy : duplex, quadruplex, testing (Melbourne, 1897) Trove
- Jenvey, H. W. Practical telegraphy : a guide for the use of officers of the Commonwealth Post and Telegraph Departments (Melbourne, 1904) Trove
- Jenvey, H. W. Practical telegraphy : a guide for the use of officers of the Commonwealth Post and Telegraph Departments (5th edition Melbourne, 1913) Trove
