= Oswald Francis Mingay =

Australian public servant, journalist, and wireless signalman

Oswald Francis Mingay (1 July 1895 – 8 August 1973) was a public servant, wireless signalman in the Australian Army during World War I, and an early wireless experimenter. He was, however, best known as a journalist, editor, and publisher of radio-related publications over several decades. He was radio manager for Burgin Electric, and influenced that firm to establish Australia's first Class B broadcasting station in 1924.

During this time, Mingay ran his own radio manufacturing business. His publishing career commenced in 1930 with "The Radio Retailer of Australia".

== Artifacts ==
- Museums Victoria Jenvey's Coherer, used for communication with St. George, 1901 Museums Victoria

== Publications ==
- Jenvey, H. W. Practical Telegraphy: A Guide for the Use of Officers of the Victorian Post and Telegraph Department, Vol. 1 (2nd edition, Melbourne, 1891) Trove
