= George Andrew =

George Andrew may refer to:

- George Andrew (Australian footballer) (1917–1987), Australian rules footballer
- George Andrew (Scottish footballer) (1945–1993), centre-back

== See also ==
- George Andrews (disambiguation)
