= 3DB (Melbourne) =

Melbourne radio station

Licence of KIIS 101.1
- Melbourne, Victoria; Australia
- Broadcast area: Melbourne RA1
- Frequencies: AM: 1026 kHz; DAB+: 9A Melbourne

Programming
- Language: English

Ownership
- Owner: Druleigh Business and Technical College Pty Ltd; 1927–1929 / Herald and Weekly Times Ltd; 1929–1987 / J. Albert & Son; 1987–1988
- Sister stations: Major Broadcasting Network

History
- Founded: 1925
- First air date: 21 February 1927
- Last air date: 2 April 1988 (as 3DB)
- Former frequencies: AM: 1180 kHz (1927–1935); 1030 kHz (1935–1978)
- Call sign meaning: DB = Druleigh Business and Technical College Pty Ltd

3DB was a Melbourne-based radio station that opened in 1927, changed its name to 3TT in 1988, and now operates on the FM band as KIIS 101.1.

3DB was one of Melbourne's most popular radio stations, topping the ratings for many decades.

== Broadcast frequency ==
Upon opening in 1927, 3DB broadcast on the AM band at a wavelength of 254 metres, corresponding to a frequency of 1180 kHz. When seven new Australian broadcasting licences were issued in 1935, including 3XY in Melbourne, most Melbourne stations were allocated new broadcast frequencies; 3DB was allocated 1030 kHz. Until 1978 there was a 10 kHz gap between radio stations. However, the Geneva Frequency Plan of 1975 changed this to a 9 kHz gap, thus allowing more stations on the AM band. Therefore, on 23 November 1978, most Australian stations changed their frequencies and 3DB went to 1026 kHz.

== History ==
=== Pre-war era – 1927–1939 ===
==== On air times ====
3DB was awarded its broadcast licence in 1925 but did not immediately come on air due to debates in Federal Parliament as to whether or not Australia should proceed with the then-unique system of A Class (later ABC) and B Class (later commercial) stations. The station eventually made its on-air debut on 21 February 1927 in a fairly low-key manner.

In the 1920s, at most stations including 3DB, it was not unusual for there to be breaks between programs during which the station temporally closed down. Sometimes these breaks were of 30 minutes' duration; sometimes longer. However, within just a few years, such breaks were eliminated and 3DB (and most other Melbourne commercial stations) broadcast for set times during each day. By 1934, 3DB was on air at the following times:

- 7:00 am to 11:30 pm Monday-Friday;
- 7:00 am Saturday to 1:00 am Sunday;
- 10:00 am to 12:30 pm Sunday;
- 2:30 pm to 10:00 pm Sunday.

Between 12.30 and 2.30 pm on Sundays all mainstream Melbourne commercial stations were required by the Postmaster-General's Department to close down. Amateur radio stations which normally broadcast on the shortwave band were permitted to use the medium wave (AM) band during these hours. 3AK which usually only broadcast after other Melbourne stations had closed down, also broadcast between these two hours. ABC stations 3AR and 3LO did not take the break between 12.30 and 2.30 on Sunday afternoons. This arrangement appears to have been exclusive to Melbourne.

By the Post-war era, 3DB's hours had been extended to:

- 6:00 am to 11:30 pm Monday-Friday;
- 6:00 am Saturday to 1:00 am Sunday;
- 8:00 am to 10:30 pm Sunday.

In the 1930s, the Postmaster-General's Department issued 24-hour licences to one station in each capital city market except Melbourne. In Melbourne, since 1931, 3AK had been broadcasting almost exclusively in the early-morning hours when other stations were off the air. However, on 1 February 1954, 3AK began broadcasting exclusively during hours of daylight, and concurrently 3DB, 3UZ and 3XY were all given 24-hour licences, but both 3DB and 3UZ had ceased all-night broadcasting within six months. 3DB's hours on the air then became:

- 5.30 am Monday-Saturday to 1.00 am the following day;
- 7.00 am Sunday to 1.00 am Monday.

However, 3DB was again broadcasting 24 hours per day by the mid-1960s.

==== DB = Druleigh Business ====
The station was originally owned by Druleigh Business and Technical College Pty Ltd, and the original licence was in the name of Edgar Sayer, principal of the college, hence the callsign "DB". The original studios were located on the 10th floor of Capitol House, above the Capitol Theatre, Swanston Street, Melbourne.

When 3DB eventually made its on-air debut on 27 February 1927, the first program was the children's session conducted by Winnie Wattle, at 6.30 pm. The official opening was at 8:00 pm when announcer Frank Pearson introduced Edward Haynes, Managing Director of Druleigh and 3DB, who said: "This is Melbourne's new 'B' class station, which is the first in Australia to carry out the American idea of making revenue from advertisements". (Even so, the station made a small loss in its first six months.) Despite the claim, in 1927, that 3DB would be the first station to make revenue from advertisements, 2UE had been broadcasting advertisements since 1925.

Others appearing on opening night were Will Davey, tenor; Mrs Henry Johnson, contralto; Billy Meeske, speaking on 'Wrestlers I Have Known'; Len Gibson's Neapolitan Sextet; Edna Johnson, reciting from Shakespeare; Elsie Watkins, soprano; and accompanist, Jess Prideaux.

==== Herald ownership ====
From 14 June 1929 until late in 1987, 3DB was owned and operated by The Herald and Weekly Times Ltd (HWT), owners of The Herald and The Sun News-Pictorial.

Later in 1929, the studios and offices were moved from Capitol House, and 3DB took sole occupancy of 74 Flinders Street, to the east of the HWT building on the corner of Flinders and Exhibition Streets. One of the studios was an auditorium accommodating live audiences, and this became a popular venue for Melburnians and the focus for the many live variety programs which the station broadcast throughout the 1930s to 1960s. In 1966 the HWT truck dock was expanded, and in the process 74 Flinders Street was pulled down, with the station then moving to 61 Flinders Lane, immediately behind the HWT building.

One of the most important people in 3DB's history was David Thomas Worrall, who was appointed manager of the station by the Herald and Weekly Times' Sir Keith Murdoch in 1929, and who was to remain as manager until 1958. He was responsible for introducing many big budget programs which, inter alia, made 3DB the top station in all Melbourne radio surveys for many decades. Worrall also formed the Major Broadcasting Network, with associated stations throughout Australia. From its formation in 1938 until its closure in the late 1970s, the Major Network was usually recognised as being second in importance after its rival, the Macquarie Radio Network. In 1930 Worrall helped to form the Australian Federation of "B" Broadcasting Stations, now Commercial Radio Australia, and he was its Federal President in 1938. David Worrall was married to Kathleen Zoe, née Norris, who broadcast on 3DB from the 1930s until 1952; firstly under her own name, and then as Martha Gardener.

Probably the longest-serving 3DB employee was Geoff Palmer who commenced as an announcer in 1929. He was a member of the Australian Society of Authors and his writing ability led to him being promoted to the continuity department. Palmer was the 3DB advertising manager when he retired in 1973.

In the late 1920s until the 1950s, 3DB tried to produce programming that would appeal to the whole of the population, at least part of the time. Musically, this ranged from classical music through to pop music, including the hit parade; much of the music being live. News and news commentaries were also important, as were live descriptions of sport. 3DB was a major broadcaster of radio drama, including soap operas, much of this being produced by 3DB itself. The station produced and broadcast a wide range variety shows, including quizzes. 3DB (like most other stations) also broadcast a wide variety of women's programs during the day, and children's sessions in the early evening. The broadcasting of this broad range of programming came to an end in the 1960s, mainly due to two factors. The first was the formal introduction of television in Australia in 1956. The second was the gradual replacement of the radio valve with the transistor. These made radios both more portable and much cheaper, meaning that every member of the family was now able to have his/her own radio set, rather than imitating the clichéd image of the whole family sitting around the family's single radio receiver.

The National Film and Sound Archives has issued an on-line list of radio programs from the 1930s to the 1970s, that are in their holdings. This list contains many dozens of 3DB programs.

==== The Smileaway Club ====
During the pre-TV era most Australian radio stations instigated some form of radio club partly as a way of keeping listeners tuned to that particular station. 3DB's Smileaway Club was one of Australia's most successful, with more than 50,000 members at its peak. The club started in 1929, when David Worrall was managing the station, but before the studios were moved away from Capitol House. The club lasted until the late 1950s. For some decades a short session, Smileaway Club Notes, was broadcast each weekday at 8.40 am, and again as a lead-in to the top rating, major news bulletin at 7.00 pm. These sessions featured live music and invitations to events such as theatre parties, bay trips, dances, visits to the zoo, hikes, fancy dress balls. Free or cheap passes to theatres, ice skating, etc., were offered to members. Various charities were also supported. The club had its own theme tune, and a commercial recording of the theme was made in the early 1930s featuring high-profile 3DB comedians/announcers, Charlie Vaude and Renn Millar – the informal style is typical of the Smileaway Club. For many years, membership was one shilling (10¢) per annum. The club issued its own badge, which is now quite collectable. Over the years, many 3DB personalities were associated with the club, in particular: Geoff Palmer, Iris Turnbull, Dorothy Silk, Charlie Vaude, Renn Millar, Sir Eric Pearce, Eric Edgley, Clem Dawe, Cedric Zahara, Dick Cranbourne and Peter Surrey. A Junior Smileway Club conducted children's parties on Saturday mornings in the 3DB auditorium, featuring community singing, games and quizzes.

==== Early experiments in transmitting vision ====
In 1929, 3DB along with 3UZ, Melbourne, and 2UE Sydney, participated in experimental television broadcasts using the Radiovision system. 3DB also experimented with the Baird system. These experiments were conducted late at night after the station had officially closed down. Only a handful of people would have had equipment capable of picking up these transmissions, which were mainly designed for those directly involved in these trials into nascent television broadcasts.

==== News theme ====
In the pre-television era, nearly all Australian radio stations had their own distinctive news themes. From the early 1930s until the 1970s 3DB used "Heart of Oak" as its news theme. "Heart of Oak" was the official march of the Royal Navy, and some other navies. Until recently, it was the Royal Australian Navy's official march. By the 1960s 3DB was using a Columbia recording of the march, played by the Orchestra of the Royal Marines, conducted by Sir Vivian Dunn. The main news bulletins at 7:45 am, 12:30 pm and 7:00 pm used the first minute the theme, whilst other bulletins only used a smaller section. The version used by 3DB can be downloaded.

==== From "Rickety Kate" to "Rehearsal for TV": the story of Test Cricket broadcasts ====
In 1930, test cricketer Don Bradman was a household name throughout Australia. There were even people who incorrectly believed that the call-sign 3DB was based on Bradman's initials. Bradman's popularity led to great interest in the 1930 Ashes series in England, in which he played a major role. In 1930 it was not possible to broadcast descriptions of the games back to Australia. However, 3DB played upon the interest and broadcast cricket updates from England, accompanied by nightly variety programs.

The cricket updates were provided by international telegrams or cables, from England to Australia, sent at the daunting rate of six shillings (60¢) per word. In 1930 the male average wage was A£7 ($14), with the female average wage being less than half of that. This meant that a cable of just 20 words cost the equivalent of the male average wage.

The variety was provided in front of a live audience by 3DB staff members led by Charlie Vaude and Renn Millar, and accompanied by guest artists. The 1930 broadcast was the first pairing of Vaude and Millar, a pair that was to go onto be one of 3DB's most listened-to comedy pairs. The highlight of the programs was their informality which certainly added to the appeal.

3DB originally planned to stay on air until midnight, but on the first night 3DB manager, David Worrall, asked: "is anyone listening?" The 3DB switchboard was flooded with calls, followed by thousands of letters and 500 telegrams. After that, the broadcasts continued until stumps, which was usually at about 3:30 am.

3DB continued to provide similar broadcasts for all of the Ashes games played in England in 1930, 1934, 1938, 1948, 1952 and 1956. (There was no test cricket during World War II.) Over the years commentators included Ron Casey, Lindsay Hassett, Bill Johnston, Ernie McCormick, Keith Rigg, Jack Ryder, Eric Welch and Bill Woodfull.

In later years, the programs were hosted by versatile 3DB announcers, Dick Cranbourne (who was also a singer), and John Stuart.

As well as Australia v England tests, a similar style of programming was also provided for a number of other overseas Test Matches played in the evening/night, Australian time. One example of this were the 1936 South Africa v Australia Tests.

Sitting in front of the audience in the 3DB auditorium was a doll known as Ricketty Kate. Whenever an important cable came through from the cricket, the doll's eyes would light up and the audience would break into the chorus of "We won't worry. We don't care. Who's afraid of the big brown bear?" It is rumoured that the name, Ricketty Kate, was based on the name of a well-known Melbourne prostitute of the time.

These programs were relayed to a number of interstate stations.

The already great interest in cricket was exacerbated by the English tour of Australia in 1932–33 and the subsequent Bodyline scandal. As well as 3DB again providing coverage of the 1934 tour of England, this also resulted in nearly every Australian radio station providing some coverage. Most commercial stations provided a format based on 3DB's successful 1930 coverage, with cricket updates being provided by cable, interspersed with variety programming. Most capital city stations provided their own entertainment, with many of these stations relaying it to country stations. The ABC, then only two years' old, provided a so-called synthetic coverage, with announcers in the studio providing a commentary based on cables from England, but to all intents and purposes sounding as if they were actually at the game in England.

3DB's 1952 cricket broadcasts were so popular that the station management looked at ways of making the informal variety section a permanent feature of the station's schedule. This led to the initiation of The Happy Gang, originally subtitled Rehearsal for TV... (See below, under Post-War History.)

==== The Minstrel Show ====
One of the most popular programs heard on 3DB was The Minstrel Show, which commenced in 1931 and continued into the 1960s. This was an Australian radio version of an American minstrel show. It was broadcast on 3DB every Thursday evening, and was relayed to Major Broadcasting Network affiliates, as well as some independent stations. The program was originally sponsored by the Akron Tyre Company who were also founders of 3AK, but within a short period of time sponsorship was taken over by optometrists Coles and Garrard, whose name was then incorporated into the program's title. When C & G ceased their sponsorship of the program in the 1960s, broadcasts of new programs ceased, but 3DB ended the long-running show by playing a number of transcriptions of programs from the 1930s.

Personalities associated with the C & G's Minstrel Show include Cecil Atkinson, Mervyn Bray, Carl Briglia, Agnes Brown, Reg Brown, Herbert Browne, Walter Burleigh, Maurice Callard, Fred Collier, Colin Crane, Dick Cranbourne, Joe Delany, Alice Dolphin, Fred Ford, Paul Gaving, John Hartley, Cyril Hambley, Don Humphries, Ernest Kopke, Geoff McComas, Jock McLachan, Hec McLennan, Renn Millar, Bert Miller, Bert Munyard, Keith Neilson, Mabel Nelson, Sir Eric Pearce, Bill Rhodesbury, Frank Rich, Stan Shields, Charles Skase, William Smith, Guy Stavordale, Peter Surrey, Mark Sutherland, Lou Toppano, Charlie Vaude, George Ventura, Frank Walsh, Monty Walters, and Ernest Wilson.

Whilst it is conceded that The Minstrel Show was popular during the 1930s, 40s, 50s & 60s, in the 2000s many people would consider it to be politically incorrect, particularly the fact that Anglo-Caucasian actors tried to imitate African Americans.

==== Horse racing ====
In 1934, 3DB lured Eric Welch over from the ABC. He provided a number of 3DB programs and was particularly known for his annual coverage of Melbourne's Anzac Day march. He was also a regular panellist on the Australian version of Information Please. However, probably his most important contribution at 3DB was to instigate the coverage of all Victorian races, as well networking with stations around Australia, so that interstate races were also covered by 3DB. He was 3DB's senior race-caller for 20 years.

One of the most important 3DB racecallers was Bill Collins who joined the station in 1953 and followed Eric Welch as 3DB's senior racecaller.

At various times other stations vied with 3DB in this field, in particular 3AW, 3XY, 3UZ and the ABC. The last station to share racing coverage with 3DB was 3UZ. However, in 1983, 3UZ revamped its program lineup and cancelled all horse racing coverage, leaving 3DB as the sole outlet for racing on Melbourne radio. 3DB adopted the slogan Racing Radio and devoted much of its programming to horse racing. In 1987 the Victorian racing industry, through the Totalisator Agency Board (TAB), purchased 3UZ and took over exclusive rights to horse racing coverage from 3DB, effective from February 1988.

For many years 3DB used the march, Grandstand, by Keith Mansfield as the theme to its racing coverage. The version used by 3DB (at least in the 1960s) was a Chappell recording featuring the Queens' Hall Light Orchestra conducted by Robert Farnon.

==== 3DB/3LK ====
On 16 May 1936, 3DB purchased 3HS Horsham, for and on behalf of the HWT. On 24 December 1936, the call sign was changed to 3LK, when the Horsham studios and transmitter were closed, and the transmitter was relocated to the small village of Lubeck, 30 kilometres to the east. 3LK did not have a local Wimmera studio, and the vast majority of its programming was relayed from 3DB. There was, however, about one or two hours per day of local programming, which came from the 3LK studio in the 3DB Melbourne building, utilising 3DB announcing staff. 3LK supported numerous local Wimmera/Mallee events and charities.

The slogan used for all 3DB/3LK programming during most of that era was: 3DB Melbourne, 3LK Central Victoria, the Herald-Sun stations, but towards the end of the DB/LK partnership, it was modified to the more logical: 3DB Melbourne, 3LK Wimmera Mallee, the Herald-Sun stations. The HWT sold 3LK on 1 February 1972 and its studios and transmitter were returned to Horsham. There was yet another name change in 1977, when 3LK Horsham became 3WM Wimmera Mallee, broadcasting from Horsham.

=== World War II era: 1939–1945 ===
==== The effects of the War on 3DB ====
On Sunday evening, 3 September 1939, 3DB was broadcasting a radio drama in the Lux Radio Theatre series. The performance of Leah Kleschna was interrupted by Prime Minister Robert Menzies announcing that Australia was at war with Germany.

Censorship was rife during the war, particularly after the U.S. entered the conflict on 7 December 1941. After General Douglas MacArthur set up his headquarters in Australia, he wielded enormous power, including on matters of censorship. Inter alia, he declared that every Australian radio station would only broadcast three news bulletins per day and that these would be simultaneous at 7:45 am, midday and 7:00 pm. During this time, the highest rating news in Melbourne was that of 3DB. Weather forecasts were banned because it was felt that this may assist the enemy.

Notices were issued banning radio stations from broadcasting some major wartime events, but as the federal government didn't have the same power over the printed press as it did over radio, newspapers usually reported events that radio was not permitted to mention.

There was some talk of closing down all commercial radio stations, as the enemy could beam-in on the transmitters and use these as bombing targets. As it transpired, this did not happen. However, some stations (not 3DB) were closed down for 24 hours as punishment for perceivably ignoring bans on radio reporting particular news items. Nevertheless, 3DB was off the air for an hour or so during an air raid drill during which all DB staff were ushered into a Flinders Lane warehouse that housed piles of mattresses. Despite this, fears were expressed that 3DB may not be really ready should there be a genuine air raid.

Many sponsors donated their advertising time to patriotic appeals.

3DB was also badly affected by staff enlisting. 3DB personality Keith Smith became a broadcaster at 9AD Labuan, Borneo, attaining the rank of sergeant. Norm Spencer was also at 9AD, joining the staff of 3DB after the war, as a producer. Smith and Spencer were only two of dozens of radio personnel who took up positions at the 20 Australian military radio stations throughout the Pacific.

The supply of overseas programs was virtually cut off during the war, particularly from the U.S., meaning that Australian stations and networks had to produce more local programs. This was particularly the case at 3DB and the Major Broadcasting Network.

15 August 1945 was VP (Victory in the Pacific) Day; a day often described as the day the lights went on all over the world. 3DB listeners heard the joyous news reported by Eric Pearce and Eric Welch.

==== Bob Dyer at 3DB ====
Robert Neal Dyer OBE, born Robert Dies in Hartsville, Tennessee, U.S.A. in 1909, made visits to Australia on a couple of occasions in the late 1930s and 40s as a member of the Marcus Show which toured the Tivoli circuit and the Princess Theatre, with Dyer performing a hillbilly and ukulele act. In 1940, 3DB manager David Worrall employed Dyer to star in a series of 26 shows called The Last of the Hillbillies, broadcast on Saturday nights at 7.15. His later radio career commenced in 1948. He was then stationed in Sydney and broadcast programs for the Major Broadcasting Network from venues throughout Australia. Programs such as Pick a Box from 1948, and Winner Take All were thus heard on Major's Melbourne outlet, 3DB. In these programs, his co-host was his wife, Dolly Dyer.

In 1951, Dyer transferred from the Major Network to the Macquarie Radio Network where he joined his friend and major rival Jack Davey. The so-called feud between the two friends was mainly contrived for promotional purposes.

From 1957, many of his radio programs were simulcast on TV and radio through Sydney station ATN and its then-sister station GTV in Melbourne.

When Dyer's programs were broadcast on 3DB, they usually topped the ratings, even though they were often purposely transmitted at the same times as the Macquarie Network were broadcasting Jack Davey programs.

==== Good Friday appeal ====
In 1942, Keith Murdoch, as managing director of HWT, agreed with the Royal Children's Hospital Good Friday Appeal organisation that The Herald would promote the appeal and that it would be broadcast on radio station 3DB. Things associated with the appeal were virtually the only things broadcast by 3DB on Good Friday, with personalities acknowledging donations on air, interspersed with entertainment and interviews from the hospital.

3DB played a major part in promoting the appeal, with the sums raised annually increasing dramatically from 1942 onwards. Figures published by the appeal management (converted to decimal currency) show that during the first 11 years of the appeal, an average of about $2,124 per annum was raised, but when 3DB joined the appeal in 1942 the amount collected during that one year rose to $16,620, an increase of approximately 800 percent. In 1943, the amount donated had already risen to over $25,000 and to over $37,000 in 1944. The amount of monies collected for the hospital has continued to rise steadily to this day. There have been some very minor, aberrant dips in the amounts raised and, ironically, one of these small decreases occurred in 1957, the year that Channel 7, then also owned by HWT, joined the appeal. The amounts raised in 1953 ($263,493) and 1954 ($312,000) were then world record amounts for radiothons.

3TT and 101.1 TT-FM, successors to 3DB, continued to support the appeal for a few years, but the radio voice of the appeal is now 3AW.

To put the Good Friday Appeal into context, prior to the television era, all Melbourne commercial radio stations (except 3AK which mainly broadcast during the early hours of the morning) conducted appeals for various charities. 3AW conducted a Mothers' Day Appeal for the Royal Women's Hospital; 3KZ's Christmas Day Appeal and its Christmas Eve broadcasts of Carols by Candlelight supported both the Austin Hospital and the blind babies; the 3UZ appeal was for the Red Cross; and 3XY supported the Brotherhood of St Laurence.

==== Stephanie Deste ====
Stephanie Deste was an actor, dancer, beautician and radio broadcaster.

Just after arriving in Australia in the late 1920s, Stephanie Deste broadcast Bible stories on the Australian Broadcasting Company, predecessor of the Australian Broadcasting Corporation.

Her many quirks were particularly highlighted when she recommenced broadcasting, on 3UZ just after World War II, presenting beauty hints and live advertisements for her beauty salons during the morning women's programs. In the late 1940s, Stephanie Deste transferred to 3DB where she continued to broadcast until the early 1960s. As well as regular appearances in the morning programs, from 1954 she presented a half-hour program, Sunday Night with Stephanie Deste at 10.30 pm on a Sunday night. The program was sponsored by the Stephanie Deste Pty Ltd beauty salons.

It is believed that this time-slot was the cheapest offered by 3DB at the time. As discussed above, as from 1 February 1954, 3DB began broadcasting 24 hours per day. Prior to this, the station had closed at 10:30 pm on Sundays. 24-hour broadcasting at 3DB only lasted for a few months, and after this 3DB began closing at 1:00 am every morning. Every evening, a two-hour program called "The Dunlop Hours, Eleven 'til One" was broadcast after 11:00 pm. This meant that as from 1 February 1954, there was a half-hour gap in programming after 10:30 pm on Sundays, which is why Stephanie Deste was able to get this time-slot at very cheap rates.

The program mainly consisted of interviews with show business personalities, both locals but, particularly, with artistes visiting from overseas. However, this eccentric program was usually more about Stephanie Deste than about the people she was interviewing. Despite its late time-slot, Sunday Night with Stephanie Deste was popular with show-biz aficionados.

=== Post World War II era: 1945–1975 ===
==== Football ====
As from 1950, 3DB provided football commentaries on Saturday and holiday afternoons; then the only times that AFL football was played. These broadcasts continued until 1987 when 3DB, as such, ceased to exist. Nevertheless, the broadcasting of races always took precedence over the football at 3DB. Whenever a race commenced, the station would cross to the racecourse, irrespective of what was happening on the football field. (This was also the case at Melbourne's other two racing stations at that time, i.e. 3AR and 3UZ).

The popularity of football in Melbourne is illustrated by the fact that in 1962, the only station not broadcasting the football was 3AR, then the ABC's classical music station.

In 1944, a 16-year-old Ron Casey joined 3DB as a turntable operator. He was soon promoted to Eric Welch's sporting department. Before moving to television, Ron Casey was to broadcast a wide variety of sports including: football, boxing, wrestling, ice hockey, athletics (especially the Stawell Gift), golf and a number of Olympic Games. In 1950 Casey, along with George Andrew were the first to broadcast football over 3DB. Others involved in DB's football coverage over the years included Sam Loxton, Dennis Cometti, Rex Hunt and, most importantly, Lou Richards who also broadcast at other times, including the Saturday breakfast session.

==== Drama ====
===== Crawford Productions =====
Hector Crawford was the brother of 3DB manager and administrator Curteis Crawford, and brother to Dorothy Crawford. He was married to soprano Glenda Raymond. Dorothy Crawford was married to 3DB announcer and producer Roland Strong.

Hector Crawford was manager of Broadcast Exchange of Australia (BEA) prior to the mid-1940s when he formed his own production company in which Dorothy Crawford played a prominent role. Prior to the television era most of the Crawford productions were produced for 3DB and relayed to radio stations across Australia. The program ending featuring the voice of Roland Strong: "produced in the studios of Hector Crawford (pause) by Dorothy Crawford" was often heard on 3DB, with Strong placing the emphasis on the name of his wife, as heard in the attached episodes of D24.

One of its most prestigious programs was Melba, the story of Dame Nellie Melba, with Glenda Raymond singing in the lead role, and Patricia Kennedy in the speaking role of Melba. The program was first broadcast in 1948, two years before Raymond and Crawford were married. Melba was followed by two other music-based dramas, The Blue Danube and The Amazing Oscar Hammerstein. Consider Your Verdict was broadcast on 3DB from 1958 to 1960, and was simulcast over HSV-7. The police drama D24, heard on 3DB, is generally believed to have been the inspiration behind later Crawford TV dramas such as Homicide, Division 4, Matlock Police and Cop Shop. Amongst the many soap operas produced by Dorothy Crawford, and also broadcast by 3DB, were Sincerely Rita Marsden, A Man Called Sheppard, Here Comes O'Malley, John Turner's Family, Women in Love and Prodigal Father.

==== Other radio theatre ====
===== Dad and Dave: a well-loved and well-remembered Australian serial =====
One of the most iconic of Australian radio serials was Dad and Dave (sometimes referred to as Dad and Dave from Snake Gully). Set in the fictional rural town of Snake Gully, it certainly appealed to city-dwellers, many of whom hankered for life in the Australian bush; a lifestyle that may or may not ever have existed. George Edwards, arguably the most important figure in Australian radio drama, played the lead role of Dad; he was also the producer, and played many of the supporting roles. John Saul played Dave, with Nell Stirling, George Edwards' third wife, in the role of Mabel. At different stages, Loris Bingham and Hope Suttor took the role of Mum. Dad and Dave was first heard in Melbourne in 1937 on 3DB but, over the decades, was heard on a number of stations and is still heard from time to time on radio nostalgia programs. The first episode is available on YouTube A collection of 23 episodes are also available through the U.S. nostalgia website Old Time Radio.

===== US broadcasts in Australia =====
Another popular drama series heard on 3DB (and other Major Broadcasting Network stations) was the Australian version of the one-hour U.S. program Lux Radio Theatre which was broadcast at 8.00 pm every Sunday night in the 1940s & 50s. High-profile actors were used. It toured various halls around Australia, and was performed in front of live audiences.

Prior to World War II, 3DB and the Major Broadcasting Network imported a number of programs, on transcription discs, particularly from the U.S. After the U.S. entered the War (see above), it became impossible to import such discs. However, in many cases, scripts were imported and Australian versions were made, often replete with Australian actors with inauthentic American accents.

An Australian version of When a Girl Marries was heard at 7.15 pm on weeknights after the major 7.00 pm news and news commentary, and ran for 19 years commencing from 1946. Although it was based on the U.S. program, some changes were made. Even the U.S. slogan "dedicated to everyone who has ever been in love" was modified to "dedicated to all those who are in love, or can remember". A download of the first Australian episode is available on YouTube.

Another U.S. program with an Australian version was Aunt Jenny. In Australia, Aunt Jenny was played by Ethel Lang.

===== British dramas =====
In the 1950s and 60s, 3DB broadcast a number of British dramas. These were mainly the product of the independent British production house, the Towers of London Syndicate, whose programs were produced for world-wide distribution, rather than in Britain. One of the most popular of these series was Secrets of Scotland Yard.

===== Other local dramas =====
As well as the Australian productions already mentioned, 3DB also broadcast a number of other Australian radio dramas, including a number by that prominent Australian radio drama producer, Grace Gibson Radio Productions.

===== Two important comedy serials =====
As well as drama, 3DB presented a number of radio comedies, two of the most notable being Fred and Maggie Everybody and Daddy and Paddy. Fred and Maggie starred Edward Howell and Therese Desmond. Daddy and Paddy featured Pat McLean and 3DB's stalwart broadcaster John Stuart. For many years, Stuart also conducted the breakfast session as Daybreak Dan and the children's session as Bob Breezy.

===== BBC comedies =====
In the early 1960s, amid much publicity, 3DB announced that it had made a deal with the British Broadcasting Corporation to broadcast a wide range of the popular BBC 30-minute comedy programs. Prior to this deal such programs had only been broadcast in Australia through the ABC or its predecessor companies. As part of the BBC/3DB deal, only programs that had already been heard on the ABC, could be replayed commercially.

==== Music ====
===== Live music =====
====== 3DB staff who were musicians ======
There were a number of employees who were renowned for their presentation of live music. Chronologically, the first was violinist Agnes Brown. She joined 3DB in 1937 as Manager of the transcription department and remained on the staff until the 1960s.

From the 1940s to the 60s, many 3DB programs were enhanced by 3DB's official piano accompanist Mabel Nelson.

Charles Skase (father of Christopher Skase) was a 3DB announcer in the 1950s and 60s. He won the Melbourne Sun Aria in 1947. He sang in many 3DB programs, including (as already noted) C&G Minstrels and The Happy Gang.

====== 3DB Symphony Orchestra ======
3DB's commitment to classical music and light classical music was proven in 1949 when the 3DB Symphony Orchestra was formed, under manager Cedric Zahara. Verdon Williams conducted classical programs and William Flynn had the baton during lighter concerts, for which the orchestra used the shortened name, the 3DB Orchestra. It is believed that apart from the U.S.'s prestigious and long-standing NBC Symphony Orchestra, 3DB and Australia's Colgate-Palmolive Radio Network were the only commercial radio enterprises in the world to form symphony orchestras. Both Australian orchestras had comparatively short lives.

====== Feature programs ======
The 3DB building at 74 Flinders Street (1929–1966) included an auditorium with a public seating area in the studio complex on the 1st floor. When the station was relocated to 61 Flinders Lane in 1966 (see above) a public auditorium was located off the foyer right near the main entrance to the building. However, because of competition to radio by television, live feature programs were becoming rarer and the auditorium at 61 Flinders Lane was certainly not used as much as the former one at 74 Flinders Street.

Some notable live music programs featured on the station over the decades are:

====== Community Singing ======
Community Singing was popular on radio from the 1920s to the 1960s, with 3DB conducting many such programs over the years. These sessions were conducted in front of live audiences who joined in the singing of popular songs, often with the words displayed on large cards or on screens. The venues ranged from large Town Halls, including the Melbourne Town Hall, and the Tivoli Theatre, to the much smaller 3DB auditorium.

Many of the earlier programs were compered by Charlie Vaude and Renn Millar. Later hosts included Dick Cranbourne, John Eden and Geoff McComas, with Mabel Nelson as accompanist.

Community singing was normally broadcast at lunch-time on weekdays.

====== Music for the People ======
As well as his endeavours in the drama field, Hector Crawford was also interested in music and particularly orchestra conducting. In 1938 he produced the first Music for the People concert. These concerts were presented a number of times during each summer season on Sunday afternoons, firstly in the Fitzroy Gardens and from 1959 in the Sidney Myer Music Bowl. 3DB broadcast all Music for the People concerts from 1940. In latter years, the concerts were televised over HSV-7. The concerts were performed by an orchestra especially formed by Hector Crawford for the purpose, and known as the Australian Symphony Orchestra, and supplemented by a wide range of mainly well-known artistes — some, such as Glenda Raymond, made famous by Crawford. Originally, the concerts were composed of light classical music but, over the years, the format became lighter and lighter and even some pop music was later performed. A classic example of the latter occurred on 12 March 1967 when The Seekers performed at Music for the People; their performance being simulcast on 3DB and HSV 7. The Seekers concert was performed in front of the largest crowd ever for a concert event in Australia with an estimated 200,000 people attending. The 2007 Guinness Book of World Records lists it as the greatest attendance at a concert in the Southern Hemisphere in history. This attendance is also included in The Australian Book of Records.

====== Mobil Quest ======
Mobil Quest was an important classical music talent quest produced by 3DB in the post-World War II era and relayed to over 50 stations across Australia. It discovered many musicians who went on to have prestigious careers, including the 1949 Mobil Quest winner Ronal Jackson. Dame Joan Sutherland was second-placed in 1949 and was the winner in 1950.

See main article

====== Australia's Amateur Hour and National Amateur Hour ======
A popular and more populist talent quest was Australia's Amateur Hour which commenced in 1940 and was produced and compered by Sydney people, but toured Australia performing in various large halls. It was originally broadcast nationally over the Macquarie Radio Network before transferring to the Major Broadcasting Network, of which 3DB was the Melbourne outlet. The first compere was Harry Dearth, who was followed by Dick Fair and then by Terry Dear. In 1956 the program was transferred back to the Macquarie network, (3AW in Melbourne). The Major network retaliated by broadcasting the National Amateur Hour at exactly the same time as its Macquarie rival. Dick Fair returned as compere of the National Amateur Hour. Both of these talent quests ceased in 1958, partly because their rivalry split the available audience, and partly because of competition from television.

====== The Happy Gang ======
The Happy Gang evolved from 3DB's pre-War cricket broadcasts (see above, under Pre-War History). Originally subtitled Rehearsal for TV, the program was broadcast in peak listening time, from 8.30 to 10.00 every Monday evening, from 1953 until 1962. Until the inevitable lure of TV cut into The Happy Gang's audience, it was one of Australia's most popular programs, being relayed across the country on the Major Broadcasting Network.

The program was initially produced by Norm Spencer. It was originally hosted by the cricket hosts Dick Cranbourne and John Stuart. Cranbourne was later joined as host by Bill Collins and Jack Perry. Other regulars in the show included Eula and Mary Parker, June Hamilton, Shirlene Clancy, Rod McLennan, Lou Toppanno, Tom Davidson, Charles Skase and Stan Stafford, and special guests including artists of the calibre of Winifred Atwell.

The show usually began with a series of calls for listeners with a particular talent to come into the studio. Dick Cranbourne would say something like: "Tonight we're calling for the biggest leek – and a plumber". Dozens of people dropped what they were doing and brought in their vegetables, whilst plumbers also arrived replete with spanners and wrenches. Other examples included: school children and grandfathers; barbers and butchers; violinists; Antarctic explorers; bathroom baritones and shower sopranos; those with monkeys, or Alsatians; "the biggest aspidistra in the world" – the list goes on. One night, there was a call for choir boys, which resulted in a 14-year-old Ernie Sigley making his first visit to the station where he was later to work.

The original subtitle, "Rehearsal for TV" was in many respects shown to be true after the introduction of TV in Melbourne in 1956. Producer Norm Spencer was to be employed at GTV-9 where he made his name as producer of In Melbourne Tonight. Before Graham Kennedy was employed as compere of I.M.T., Spencer had suggested Dick Cranbourne. Bill Collins became the popular host of HSV-7's variety program Sunnyside Up. Jack Perry made his name as Zig of Zig and Zag, also on HSV-7.

A Happy Gang extract is available on YouTube.

====== Swallow's Parade ======
Swallows Parade was an Australian radio and television series. The radio version was broadcast by 3DB in the 1950s and 1960s, and was relayed on the Major Broadcasting Network. It was heard on a Thursday evening, with auditions being held on Tuesdays. It was sometimes presented in front of a live audience, and sometimes with just the compere and artists. It was usually broadcast from various towns and cities with Major Network outlets. Sometimes programmes would be compiled from various recording sessions. All artists were amateurs.

====== Swallow's Juniors ======
Swallow's Juniors was broadcast at 6:30 pm on a Saturday evening, from the 1950s and into the early 1960s. It was also telecast from November 1957 to 1970 on HSV-7. There was a period of radio/TV simulcasting before it was exclusively telecast.

It was a talent contest featuring young performers, and was initially hosted by 3DB breakfast announcer John Eden. However Brian Naylor soon took over as compere.

====== Coca-Cola Bottlers Club ======
In the late 1950s, Dick Cranbourne, assisted by 3DB's official piano accompanist Mabel Nelson, presented a children's session sponsored by Coca-Cola Bottlers (Melbourne) Pty. Ltd., and recorded at various suburban halls such as church halls, in front of an audience, mainly made-up of children. A full week's programming (4 sessions) was recorded in one sitting. The program mainly consisted of a junior talent quest, quizzes, etc. As well as the 3DB program, Coca-Cola also broadcast a similar program on 2UW Sydney.

====== Hillbilly Time ======
The last live music program to be heard on 3DB was Hillbilly Time, again hosted by Dick Cranbourne. It ran from the early 1950s to the early 1980s. In its final years, it changed its name to Country and Western Hour. As both names suggest, the program featured live hillbilly music, also referred to as country and western music. It was amongst the last fully live programs on Melbourne commercial radio.

==== Recorded music ====
===== The 3DB record library =====
The BBC record library was the world's largest radio record library, at one stage containing 45,000 discs. Thanks to the work of Program Manager Stan Clark, in 1934 3DB had the world's second largest radio library. It has been estimated that, at that time, 3DB could have stayed on the air from daybreak to dawn for six months without repeating a record.

===== Experiments in improved sound =====
Until 1948 when standard long playing discs first became commercially available, most recordings broadcast were 78 rpm monaural discs with one horizontal sound wave on the disc. In the 1930s however, there were some experiments with a vertical sound wave cut straight down into the disc. At the time, the main advantage of this was seen as being the improved sound quality, but these experiments eventually led to the invention of stereophonic sound. In Melbourne, three radio stations signed contracts with producers of vertical discs that gave them exclusive rights to play their recordings, and these were usually broadcast in specially devoted programs. 3DB played Diamondpoint discs especially imported from London, 3KZ played hill and dale records, and 3AW had a contract to use Vitatone recordings.

===== Music formats 1950s–1970s =====
Most Australian radio stations increased their commitment to the teenage market and to pop music in the 1950s, by introducing disc jockeys. 3DB's first DJ was Geoff Corke. He was soon followed by Ernie Sigley who actually commenced his career at 3DB in 1953 as a turntable operator (then usually referred to as record boys) – this was actually a few years before he was given an on-air position. Another early 3DB DJ was Rod McLennan.

==== Television simulcasts ====
HSV-7 was originally owned by the HWT, as was 3DB. After HSV opened on 4 November 1956, there were a few programs that were simulcast on HSV and 3DB; these included Consider Your Verdict (see above – "Crawford Productions"), Music for the People (see above – "Live Music") and Swallows Juniors (see above – "Swallows Juniors"). Another important program that was simulcast was Meet the Press which was originally compared by journalist Frederick Howard.

At this same time, a number of 3DB quiz and variety programs featuring Bob and Dolly Dyer (see above – Bob Dyer) were, on account of Major Broadcasting Network connections, simulcast on Sydney TV station ATN-7 and through its then Melbourne affiliate GTV-9.

==== Talkback ====
3DB was one of the first Melbourne radio stations to initiate talkback programs on 17 April 1967 with Barry Jones conducting the first such program. Other early talkback hosts included Doug Aiton, Gerald Lyons and Michael Schildberger.

=== An era of adjustments: 1975–1988 ===
==== 1975: a major change of direction ====
In 1975 Fred Flowers, Director of Broadcasting at 3DB, announced "the most radical changes in our history". He introduced a new slogan DB MUSIC. He went on to say that the station would have: "an exciting new sound with a blend of Top 40, flashbacks, and popular album tracks ... we aim to please the 18 to 39 age group. In fact, to attract listeners of any age who have a youthful lifestyle".

Because of a contract with the Totalisator Agency Board, 3DB continued to broadcast horse races. Doug Aiton's morning talkback program also continued to be heard.

In August 1980, the station was yet again rebranded as 100 3DB with a new disco-style jingle, "Rhythm of the City", produced by TM Studios. The jingle was also used (with localised variations) by radio stations throughout Australia that had a similar Top 40 format at the time, including 2UE in Sydney, 6PM in Perth, and 5AD in Adelaide. An extended length version of "Rhythm of the City" was later released as a single, inclusive of local branding edits depending on release location. The 3DB version of the single reached number 91 on the Australian Kent Music Report charts in October that year.

==== 3DB – The New Beginning ====
In mid-1986, Bert Newton was appointed general manager of 3DB, which he relaunched as a talkback station, while retaining its horse racing coverage (see above). Many high-profile personalities had regular programs, including Bert Newton himself who was the breakfast session host during this era, also Shane & The King, Arthur Higgins, Mickie De Stoop, Bill Tuckey, and Hal Todd. A new slogan was used by the station – 3DB – The New Beginning.

==== 3DB, the new ending ====
After purchasing the Geelong Advertiser and its subsidiary 3GL in 1987, the Herald and Weekly Times owned more than one station in the Melbourne/Geelong region, and thus was required by the Australian Broadcasting Tribunal to divest itself of one station. 3DB was sold and actually had four owners for short periods in the 12 months of 1987, including Kerry Stokes and Frank Lowy.

J Albert and Son, a Sydney-based music company and owners of 2UW, purchased 3DB in late 1987 and changed the call sign to 3TT. The last program to be broadcast under the 3DB call sign, in the very early hours of 2 April 1988, was a repeat of Bert Newton's five-hour documentary on the 60th anniversary of 3DB, first broadcast in February 1987 to coincide with the 60th anniversary.

3TT was launched at 5:00 am on 2 April 1988. The major reason cited for the change of name was that 3DB had recently broadcast under the slogan 3DB – The New Beginning and it was felt that that would have made it difficult to dramatically change the format whilst retaining the 3DB name. However, the new owners had actually considered a few other new call-signs, particularly names which included the same initial being repeated twice, such as 3BB or 3MM.

Lawrence Costin who had been on the 3DB announcing staff for over 30 years was the only 3DB on-air personality to be retained by 3TT, as a newsreader and reporter.

== Personalities ==
The following list is based, in the main, on names mentioned in a history of 3DB published in 1985. Some names appear under more than one sub-heading. Other personalities crossed from one field to another: for example, a news reader may do some general announcing; a general announcer may appear in a drama; a variety artist may do some general announcing, etc.

=== Management and administration ===
- Agnes Brown,
- Stan Clark,
- Curteis Crawford,
- Rae Dunn,
- Edward Haynes,
- Fred Flowers,
- Geoff McComas,
- Flora McTavish (secretary to the manager),
- Bert Newton,
- Geoff Palmer,
- Sir Eric Pearce,
- Warwick Prime,
- Brendan Sheedy,
- Charlie Taylor,
- David Worrall.

=== Producers, writers, etc. ===
- Clem Dawe,
- Myke Dyer,
- Eric Edgley,
- Geoff McComas,
- Alf Potter,
- Leslie Ross,
- Norm Spencer,
- Morris West,
- Les White,
- Cedric Zahara.

=== Technicians ===
- Clem Allan,
- Ewen Cameron,
- Andrew Darbyshire AM,
- Arnold Holst,
- Hector Holst,
- Otto Holst,
- Val Parker.

=== Gen eral announcers ===
- Bill Acfield,
- John Allan (reputed to be the last duty announcer on 3DB),
- John Anderson,
- Andrew Bensley,
- Monty Blandford,
- Maurie Callard,
- Frank Cave,
- Allan Cooper,
- Pat Corby,
- Geoff Corke,
- Lawrence Costin,
- Dick Cranbourne,
- Colin Crane,
- John Deeks,
- Stephanie Deste
- John Devine,
- Tony Doherty,
- John Eden,
- Keith Eden,
- Doug Entwistle,
- Barry Ferber,
- John-Michael Howson,
- Graham Kennedy,
- Don Kinsey,
- Ken Lyons,
- Bob Machliss,
- Geoff McComas,
- Keith McGowan,
- Rod McLennan,
- Garry Meadows,
- Ric Melbourne,
- Renn Millar,
- Bert Newton,
- John O'Connor,
- Geoff Palmer,
- Sir Eric Pearce,
- Frank Pearson (an original announcer),
- Roland Redshaw,
- Stan Rofe,
- Dennis Scanlan,
- Vernon Sellars,
- Ernie Sigley,
- Charles Skase,
- Keith Smith,
- Peter Surrey,
- Charlie Vaude,
- John Vertigan,
- Danny Webb.

=== Women's program presenters ===
- Stephanie Bini,
- Elizabeth (Elizabeth Burbury),
- Martha Gardener – Kathleen Zoe Worrall (wife of David Worrall) [née Norris],
- Louise Homfrey,
- Bernice "Binny" Lum,
- Dorothy Silk,
- Iris Turnbull.

=== Children's program presenters ===
- Dick Cranbourne,
- Jean Lawson,
- Sally Anne (Milicent Osmond),
- Isobel Ann Shead,
- John Stuart,
- Tillie the Telephone Girl (Marjorie Troy),
- Winnie Wattle (believed to have been the first person to broadcast over 3DB).

=== Sports broadcasters – racing ===
- Brian Blackmore,
- Bill Collins,
- Dick Cranbourne,
- Bert Day,
- Keith McGowan,
- Brian Martin,
- John Vertigan,
- Eric Welch.

=== Sports broadcasters – cricket ===
- Ron Casey,
- Lindsay Hassett,
- Bill Johnston,
- Ernie McCormick,
- Keith Rigg,
- Jack Ryder,
- Eric Welch,
- Bill Woodfull.

=== Sports broadcasters – VFL/AFL Football ===
- George Andrew,
- Ron Casey,
- Dennis Cometti,
- Rex Hunt,
- Sam Loxton,
- Lou Richards.

=== Sports broadcasters – other ===
- Ron Casey – boxing, wrestling, ice hockey, athletics (especially the Stawell Gift), golf and a number of Olympic Games,
- Rex Hunt – fishing,
- Eric Welch – wrestling,
- Merv Williams – boxing & wrestling.

=== News readers and commentators ===
- John Boland,
- Maurie Callard,
- Lawrence Costin,
- Keith Dunstan,
- John Eden,
- David Johnston
- Frederick Howard,
- Reg Leonard,
- Geoff McComas,
- Renn Millar,
- Brian Naylor
- Sir Eric Pearce,
- Geoff Raymond,
- Roland Redshaw,
- Mal Walden.

=== Talkback presenters ===
- Doug Aiton,
- John Anderson,
- Ron Casey,
- Father Gerard Dowling,
- Pat Jarrett,
- Barry Jones,
- Gerald Lyons,
- Michael Schildberger.

=== Actors and drama producers ===
- Dorothy Crawford,
- Hector Crawford,
- Keith Eden,
- George Edwards,
- Louise Homphrey,
- Patricia Kennedy,
- Ray Russell,
- Nell Sterling.

=== Variety artists and producers ===
- The 3DB Quartet,
- Max Bostok,
- Geoff Brooke,
- Agnes Brown,
- Shirlene Clancy,
- Bill Collins,
- Dick Cranbourne,
- Colin Crane,
- Dorothy Crawford,
- Hector Crawford,
- Tom Davidson,
- Bob Dyer,
- Dolly Dyer,
- Jim Gerald,
- Les Gordon,
- June Hamilton,
- Dan Hardy,
- Darcy Kelway,
- Rod McLennan,
- Jock McLachan,
- Renn Millar,
- Mabel Nelson – official 3DB accompanist,
- Jack O'Hagan,
- Eula Parker,
- Marie Parker,
- Sir Eric Pearce,
- Jack Perry,
- Glenda Raymond,
- Charles Skase,
- Stan Stafford,
- John Stuart,
- Mark Sutherland,
- Charles Taylor,
- Lou Toppano,
- Charlie Vaude,
- George Wallace Snr,
- Cedric Zahara.

=== Presenters of speciality programs ===
- Stephanie Deste – theatrical
- Crosbie Morrison – wildlife
- C. G. Scrimgeour – science

== Downloads of 3DB audio (and some video) ==
- 60th anniversary history of 3DB, 1987, with Bert Newton, then Manager of 3DB.
- 3DB bits and pieces from the early 1950s
- 3DB news theme, Heart of Oak, played by the Orchestra of the Royal Marines, conducted by Sir Vivian Dunn. The main news bulletins at 7.45am, 12.30pm and 7.00pm used the first 25 seconds of the theme, whilst other bulletins only used a smaller section.
- The Smileaway Club theme with Charlie Vaude and Renn Millar
- Interview with 1930s 3DB personality Ken Lyons; interview from 3AW's Nightline with Philip Brady and Simon Owens, 2010s.
- 1939 declaration of war by the Prime Minister of Australia, The Rt Hon. Robert Menzies and broadcast by 3DB.
- I Lost My Heart on Hayman Island, Max Blake and the 3DB Orchestra.
- The Melba Story, links to various episodes of the famous Crawford Production.
- Dad and Dave, 1st episode in 1937, plus a collection of 23 episodes
- Episode 1 of the Australian version of the U.S.'s When a Girl Marries.
- Lux Radio Theatre, two episodes.
- Secrets of Scotland Yard, 57 episodes.
- Address Unknown, 33 episodes.
- D24, 15 episodes.
- Consider Your Verdict, a link to a number of episodes.
- Fred and Maggie Everybody.
- Daddy and Paddy.
- Max Bostok interview re his radio and TV days, including The Happy Gang in the 1950s.
- The Happy Gang.
- Top hits of 1962 with Barry Ferber and Ernie Sigley.
- Tony Doherty Show, 1960s.
- Dennis Scanlan talkback, three segments.
- Rhythm of the City jingle, from the late 1970s.
- Another Rhythm of the City promotion, preceded by a 1980 advert. for the United Australia Party with Clive Palmer
- 1981 television commercial for Ernie Sigley on 3DB.
- 1983 racing promotion featuring Michael Schildberger.
- Thanks for the Memory hosted by Bob Machliss, 14 December 1986.
- Ertha Kitt, interviewed by Bert Newton, 1986.
- 3DB Melbourne's Own jingle, 1986/87.
- Overnight music from 3DB, c1986/87

== See also ==
- Major Broadcasting Network
- KIIS 101.1
- History of broadcasting in Australia
- Radio Times
