= Vaude =

Vaude may refer to:

- Madame Vaudé-Green (1822-1902), nineteenth century French photographer
- Charlie Vaude (1884–1942), Australian stage and radio comedian
- Nicolas Vaude (born 1962), French actor
- VAUDE, producer of mountain sports equipment
- Vaud, canton of Switzerland
- Vaudeville, a theatrical genre of variety entertainment
