= 3DB =

3DB may refer to:

- 3 dB point, the cutoff frequency of an electronic amplifier stage at which the output power has dropped to half of its mid-band level
- 3DB (Melbourne) an Australian radio station now broadcasting as KIIS 101.1.
