= Radio Times (Australia) =

Australian weekly radio programme

Radio Times, originally known as Radioprogram, was a weekly Melbourne radio program guide established in Melbourne, Australia in 1934. In the late 1930s it changed its name to Radio Times.

== Radioprogram ==
The first edition of Radioprogram was issued in July 1934. It covered the weekly programs for Melbourne's six major radio stations (3AR, 3LO, 3UZ, 3DB, 3KZ and 3AW) for the week 14–20 July. The programs for Cinderella station 3AK, which mainly broadcast in the early hours of the morning when other Melbourne stations were closed, were not included in early editions.

Radioprogram displayed a dark brown cover with details of the magazine in white print. The first edition did not have any front-cover illustration, but later editions did. Issue No.1 was 122 x 184 mm; it soon evolved into 134 x 215 mm.

By at least the beginning of 1936, the program guide had been expanded to include 3AK's schedules, as well as summaries of some interstate programs, along with an abbreviated list of some shortwave radio station's programs. It also included the programs for 3XY which had opened in 1935.

The editor was Henry Drysdale Bett who was assisted by his brother, John Gordon Bett, and by Tam William Mappin, the assistant editor. Radioprogram was a competitor to The Listener-In a radio program guide published by the Herald and Weekly Times.

== Radio Times ==
By the late 1930s, Radioprogram had evolved into a tabloid. It was renamed Radio Times. After a short period in which Radio Times was printed in conventional black ink on white paper, it adopted a distinctive black ink on green paper format.

After a few years, the Herald and Weekly Times decided that Radio Times was affecting the sales figures for the Listener-In and therefore told newsagents that if they continued to sell Radio Times, all HWT publications would be withdrawn. In this era, HWT publications, including The Herald and The Sun News-Pictorial, would have accounted for a large percentage of all newsagents' sales. The Victorian Railways' bookstalls were the only newsagent chain large enough to stand up to the HWT and continue to stock Radio Times. With this one exception, Radio Times could only be obtained from milk bars. The details of the feud with HWT were reported in a number of editions of Radio Times, and there were legal battles as well.

In the late 1940s Editor H. Drysdale Bett and John Bett had a falling-out which led John Bett to make an offer to The Age. In 1949, John Bett founded and edited "The Age Radio Supplement" which was a supplement published every Thursday. Like Radio Times, it was printed on green paper. "The Age Radio Supplement" evolved into "The Age Green Guide" which is still published every Thursday as a supplement to The Age.

The Radio Times ceased publication in 1950.
