= Information Please =

American radio quiz show

- Genre: radio
- Created by: Dan Golenpaul
- Presented by: Clifton Fadiman
- Country of origin: United States
- No. of seasons: 13

Production
- Running time: 30 minutes

Original release
- Network: NBC Radio
- Release: May 17, 1938 – April 22, 1951

Information Please is an American radio quiz show, created by Dan Golenpaul, which aired on NBC from May 17, 1938, to April 22, 1951. The title is the contemporary phrase used to request from telephone operators what was then called "information" and later called "directory assistance".

The series was moderated by Clifton Fadiman. A panel of experts would attempt to answer questions submitted by listeners. For the first few shows, a listener was paid $2 for a question that was used, and $5 more if the experts could not answer it correctly. When the show got its first sponsor (Canada Dry), the total amounts were increased to $5 and $10 respectively. A complete Encyclopædia Britannica was later added to the prize for questions that stumped the panel. At the end of the November 5th, 1940 program (131), an announcement was made that Canada Dry was ending their sponsorship of the program. Also, it was announced that the program was moving to another network and on Fridays.

The amounts rose to $10 and $25 when Lucky Strike took over sponsorship of the program.

By 1948, the prizes changed to the following: submitting a question awarded the viewer an Encyclopædia Britannica world atlas, and stumping the panel added a $50 savings bond plus the complete encyclopedia. They also replaced the regular sponsorship with a different sponsor for certain broadcasts.

== Regulars ==
Panel regulars included writer-actor-pianist Oscar Levant and newspaper columnists and renowned wits and intellectuals Franklin P. Adams and John Kieran. All the panelists were well versed in a wide range of topics, though each had a specialty. Music and film questions were often addressed to Levant. Adams was well known for his mastery of poetry, popular culture and Gilbert and Sullivan. Kieran was an expert in natural history, sports and literature. A typical question would have three or four parts and would require the panelists to get a majority of the questions right, lest they lose the prize money.

The show would always have a fourth guest panelist, usually either a celebrity, a politician or writer. Guest panelists included Fred Allen, Leonard Bernstein, Boris Karloff, Clare Boothe Luce, Groucho Marx, Dorothy Parker, S. J. Perelman, Sigmund Spaeth, Rex Stout, Jan Struther, Deems Taylor, Jackie Robinson, Alexander Woollcott, George S. Kaufman, Ruth Gordon, Orson Welles, Basil Rathbone, Moe Berg, and a very young Myron "Mike" Wallace.

The show was as much a comedy as a quiz show. The panelists displayed a quick wit in answering the questions, reveling in puns and malapropisms. (For instance, once the panel was asked to supply a common household expression. Adams: "Please pass the salt." Kieran: "The front doorbell's ringing." Levant: "Are you going to stay in that bathroom all day?") Due to the spontaneous nature of the program, it became the first show for which NBC allowed a prerecorded repeat for the West Coast.

== Accolades ==
During World War II, the show frequently went on tours from its New York City base to promote the buying of war bonds. Instead of the usual cash prize, a question writer would win a bond. The show received several awards as an outstanding radio quiz show. It is also believed to be the earliest example of the panel game genre.

The program was so popular that, from 1939 to 1943, excerpts of 18 radio broadcasts were filmed and released by RKO Pictures as a series of theatrical shorts. Two card games based on the series were also released, as was a 1939 tie-in quiz book from Simon & Schuster.

The show was satirized by the zany panel of radio's It Pays to Be Ignorant, which likewise enjoyed a successful radio run from 1942 to 1951.

In 1947, Golenpaul edited the Information Please Almanac, a reference book which continued through the years in different formats (including the website Infoplease).

The program was mentioned by name in the 1949 film A Letter to Three Wives, as well as the 1944 film The Eve of St. Mark.

At the start of the 1942 movie Woman of the Year, Spencer Tracy's character enters a bar and hears on the radio Katharine Hepburn's character appearing on Information Please.

== Television ==
Information Please
- Genre: TV
- Created by: Dan Golenpaul
- Presented by: Clifton Fadiman (June–August); John McCaffery (August–September)
- Country of origin: United States

Production
- Running time: 30 minutes

Original release
- Network: CBS
- Release: June 29 – September 21, 1952

Information Please went to television from June 29 to September 21, 1952, on CBS Television on Sundays at 9:00 pm as a summer replacement for The Fred Waring Show, a musical variety series. Adams and Kieran returned to the show, with Fadiman again as host and a guest panelist on each episode. The first week's guest was James A. Michener. On August 17, Fadiman was replaced by John McCaffery for the rest of the show's run.

A variation of Information Please, this time a program devoted exclusively to music with the same four-member panel format, became popular when it was televised in Los Angeles in 1953. After two years of local success, Musical Chairs became a summer replacement series on NBC Television. The Bill Leyden-hosted game show lasted eleven weeks on the national airwaves.

== International ==
An Australian version of the program was first broadcast from Melbourne radio station 3DB in about 1939, and was relayed to Sydney station 2CH from July 1941. It was soon relayed nationwide through the Major Broadcasting Network. The program continued into the early 1960s. John Stuart was the host. (Stuart was a prominent 3DB broadcaster who presented the breakfast program under the pseudonym Daybreak Dan, and the children's session as Bob Breezy.) Panelists included Barry Jones, Edward Alexander Mann, who broadcast as "The Watchman", Crosbie Morrison, Alan Nichols, John Lynch, Professor W.A. Osborne, Ian Mair, Dr Charles Souter, Eric Welch.

== Listen to ==
- Archive.org Information Please radio shows
- OTR Network Library: Information Please (68 episodes from 1938-1943)
- Zoot Radio, free old time radio show downloads of 'Information Please.'
- "Information Please". RadioEchoes. 1938–1948. 236 episodes.
