= Philip Crosbie Morrison =

Australian naturalist and journalist (1900–1958)

Philip Crosbie Morrison (19 December 1900 – 1 March 1958) was an Australian naturalist, educator, journalist, broadcaster and conservationist.

== Early years ==
Morrison was born in Hawthorn, Victoria. He attended Auburn State School and University High School. In 1918 he became a teacher at Wesley College. He entered Melbourne University in 1921 where he studied zoology, obtaining a BSc in 1924 and a MSc in 1926.

== The journalist and educator ==
In 1926 Morrison joined the staff of the Melbourne Argus as a journalist. In 1938 he was persuaded by Keith Murdoch to accept the position of founding editor of a new monthly magazine, Wild Life. In order to promote the magazine he also began a series of weekly radio broadcasts on the ABC (through 3AR), 3UZ and 3DB. His Wild Life series on 3DB ran for over 20 years and made him an admired radio personality. It was syndicated throughout Australia on the Major Broadcasting Network. He was also a prominent panelist on 3DB's popular Information Please, which was also heard Australia-wide through the Major network.

During the Second World War he also served for a while as the Victorian state publicity censor, and later with the broadcasting division of the federal Department of Information, until policy disagreements forced his departure. He also worked as a lecturer in natural history with the Victorian Council of Adult Education and, from 1942, with the Australian Army Education Service, and contributed articles to Walkabout magazine.

== The conservationist ==
Morrison had long promoted the protection of wildlife and the need for proper management of national parks in his radio broadcasts and in Wild Life magazine. In 1952 he became the inaugural chairman of the newly formed Victorian National Parks Association. In 1957 he was appointed the first director of the Victorian National Parks Authority.

== Personal life ==
Morrison married Lucy Frances Washington on 8 March 1930. He died on 1 March 1958 of a cerebral haemorrhage at his home in Brighton, survived by his wife and two sons.

== Honours ==
- 1941-1943 – President of the Field Naturalists Club of Victoria
- 1947 – awarded the Australian Natural History Medallion by the Field Naturalists Club of Victoria
- 1949-1951 – President of the Royal Society of Victoria
- 1955-1958 – Vice-president and chairman of the National Museum of Victoria

The Crosbie Morrison Building and nearby Amphitheatre at the Australian National Botanic Gardens, Canberra, were named for him.

== Publications ==
Apart from numerous articles, papers and reports published in Wild Life and elsewhere, books authored by Morrison include two posthumous compilations of material from his radio broadcasts:

- 1961 – Along the Track with Crosbie Morrison. Whitcombe & Tombs (Melbourne).
- 1961 – Nature Talks to New Zealanders. Whitcombe & Tombs: Christchurch.
