= Wild Life (magazine) =

Defunct monthly natural history magazine

Wild Life was a Melbourne-based, Australian, illustrated, monthly natural history magazine that was published from 1938 to 1954. It was established by newspaper proprietor Sir Keith Murdoch and largely edited by Philip Crosbie Morrison throughout its existence.
