= Dan Golenpaul =

American radio producer

Dan Golenpaul (1900 – February 13, 1974) was the creator of Information Please, a popular American radio quiz show which aired on NBC from 1938 to 1951. Golenpaul also edited early editions of the spin-off book, the Information Please Almanac. He was married to Ann Golenpaul, with whom he founded Golenpaul Associates, a radio production company. He died in New York City in 1974 after a long illness.
