= Stephanie Deste =

Australian actor and performer (1901–1996)

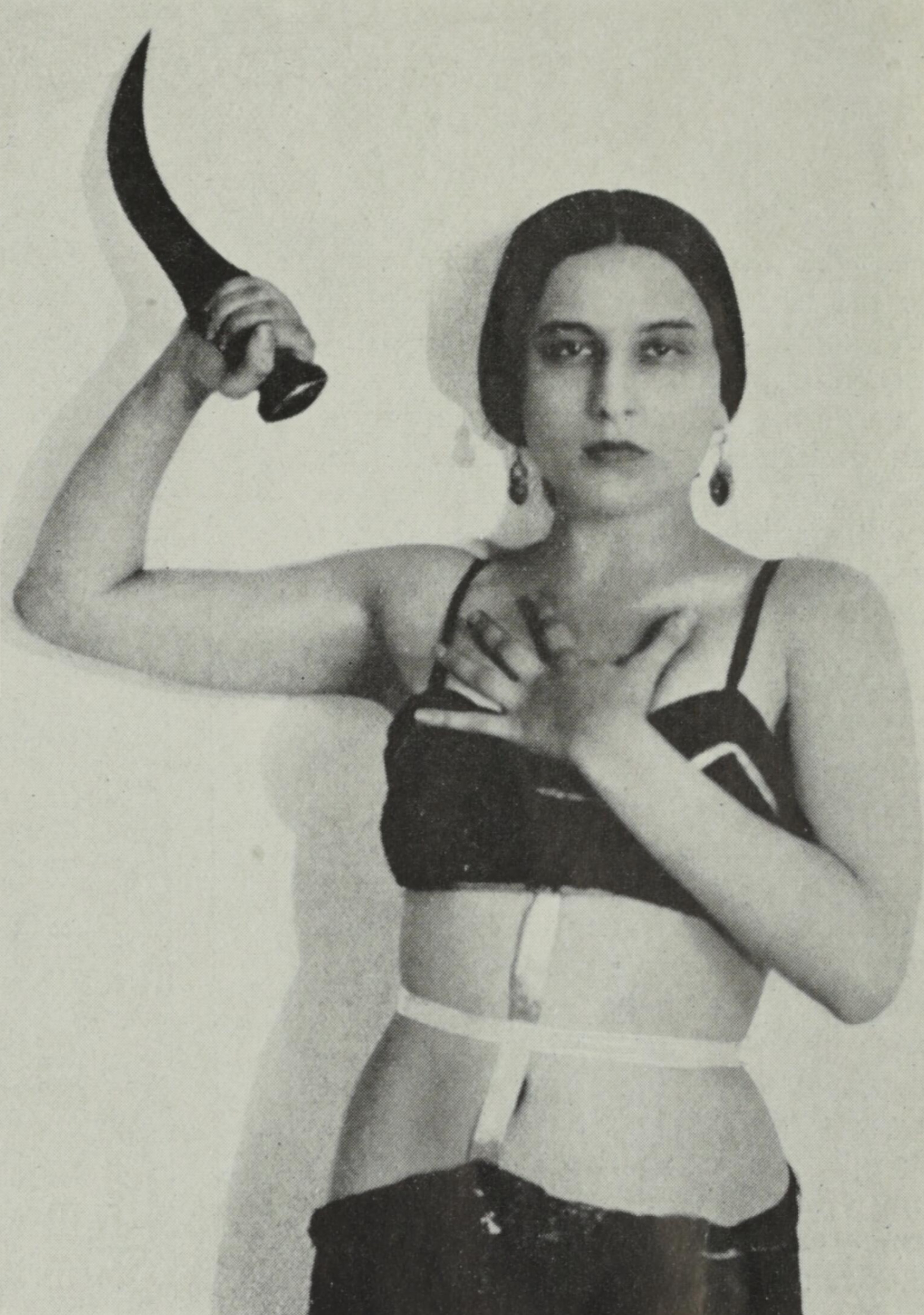
- Deste as Wanda in J. C. Williamson's Rose-Marie (photograph published in 1927)
- Born: Fanny Rosine Deitz; 22 January 1901; Liège, Belgium
- Died: 14 April 1996 (aged 95); Melbourne, Victoria, Australia
- Other name: Stephanie D'Este
- Occupations: dancer, actor, stage performer, radio personality
- Years active: 1920-1973
- Spouse: Remigio Budica

Stephanie Deste (22 January 1901 – 14 April 1996) was an Australian actor, dancer, radio broadcaster, and beautician. Deste made important contributions to Australian theatrical culture through her stage and radio work and was an influence and inspiration to other artists. She was a resident of Melbourne from 1936 to her death in 1996; with her flamboyant dress and mannerisms and a conspicuous public presence, Deste was considered to be one of the great characters of Melbourne.

Deste was born into a Jewish family in Belgium but settled in England as a child after the death of her father. She studied acting and dance and found regular work in London theatrical productions. By the early 1920s she had relocated to North America where she found work in Chicago and New York, often in roles portraying a sensuous exotic dancer. In 1925, Deste was engaged to play the Indigenous Canadian temptress Wanda in JC Williamson's Australian production of Rose-Marie, which proved to be highly successful, running for two years (which included a record-breaking season in Sydney followed by a tour of the Australian states and New Zealand). Deste's performance as Wanda, leading the spectacular Totem dancers, was considered a highlight of the show. In 1928 she featured in The Desert Song in Melbourne, before returning to Europe for about six years where she performed and organised theatrical productions, as well as studying modern methods of cosmetic treatments in Paris.

Deste returned to Australia in 1936 and settled in Melbourne where she operated and managed successful beauty clinics, made regular radio broadcasts and occasionally returned to the stage. She was well known in Melbourne due to a high public profile and her ostentatious and exuberant personal style.

== Early life ==
Stephanie Deste was born Fanny Rosine Deitz on 22 January 1901 at Liège in Belgium, the daughter of Isidore Deitz, a linen merchant from a Sephardic Jewish family, and Christine Manheim, a musician from a Dutch family of goldsmiths and musicians. Fanny's father died when she was young and by 1911 she, her mother, and her younger sister, were living in England (at Eastbourne in county Sussex) with her maternal aunt, Flora van Lier, and her husband Simon (both professional violinists).

Fanny's first acting roles were "playing child parts in Shakespearean presentations". In 1914, aged thirteen, Fanny began studying acting and dance at the Academy of Dramatic Art in London.

== Career ==
=== Theatrical career ===
Fanny Dietz adopted the stage name of 'Stephanie D'Este'.

By 1917, aged sixteen years, D'Este was a member of a company of actors in London performing two plays a week, presenting melodramas such as The Lights o' London and The Dangers of New York. As a fluent French speaker, she was also a member of a French company. D'Este played leading roles in the comedy play Masks and Faces and in 1920 she had a role in the bazaar scene of Chu Chin Chow in London, which she played "with a snake curled up on her shoulder".

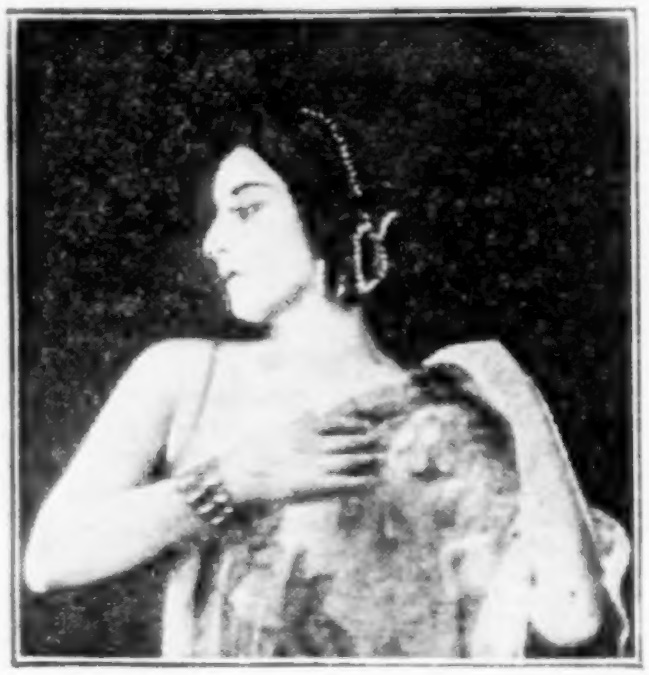
Stephanie D'Este as Salome (published in The Billboard, 16 August 1924).

In September 1921. D'Este travelled to Canada to perform in John Galsworthy's play The Skin Game. By her later account, the play "flopped"; when it was time to return to England D'Este "ran away" and eventually made her way to Chicago. D'Este had decided to remain in America because the theatres of London were "still recovering" from the effects of World War I. In a 1924 interview she "defined America as the land of activity and England as a nice land in which to be lazy". In Chicago D'Este was initially unable to find a job because of her English accent, a period she later described as involving "some starvation and several misadventures".

D'Este eventually relocated to New York "where the English accent was an asset" and found work with the Theatre Guild, appearing in many of their productions including Peer Gynt. She also found work with the Marion Wilcox Company on Long Island. From November to February 1923 D'Este performed the role of "a gentlewoman" in Shakespeare's Hamlet, at the Sam H. Harris Theatre in New York's theatre district (with a cast that included John Barrymore in the title role and Tyrone Power Sr. as Claudius, King of Denmark).

D'Este was cast as Salome in Oscar Wilde's play of the same name by the Co-Operative Play Company in Chicago. While she was engaged with the company D'Este became ill and spent several months in hospital. After her recovery she found work as a model, before returning to New York where in 1924 she was engaged to again play Salome.

By July 1924 D'Este was performing in the title role in Salome, playing at The Triangle Theatre in Greenwich Village, New York. In her performances in both New York and Chicago, Stephanie D'Este ended up playing the title role in Oscar Wilde's Salome a total of 850 times. D'Este was forced to discontinue her role as Salome at The Triangle after she sprained her ankle, followed by a bout of influenza. After recovering, by about March 1925 she was playing The Woman in a one-act version of The Woman of Samaria at The Triangle Theatre, as well as performing dances at the Yiddish Art Theatre. During this period she found roles in motion pictures, including as a dancer in the silent film Soul Fire. D'Este also had several small roles in films featuring Douglas Fairbanks.

From April to June 1925 D'Este had a prominent role in Aloma of the South Seas, a play by LeRoy Clemens and John B. Hymer, which was performed in the Lyric Theatre on 42nd Street in New York.^{[A]}

The operetta Rose-Marie, written by Otto Harbach and Oscar Hammerstein II, had opened in the Imperial Theatre in New York in September 1924. One day during 1925 D'Este was attending a matinee of the performance, sitting in the front near the stage, when an usher tapped her on the shoulder and told her Mr. Hammerstein wished to speak to her backstage. Hammerstein told her the leading lady had broken her jaw and the actress playing the mixed-blood Indigenous Canadian girl Wanda was to move into the leading role of Rose-Marie. He offered the role of Wanda to D'Este, to start the following afternoon. Stephanie accepted; as she later described, she "learnt the lines all night in a cafeteria", adding "I faked the dancing". The musical proved to be a success, running in New York until January 1926. Towards the end of the New York season Nevin Tait of J. C. Williamson's engaged D'Este for a three-month season of Rose-Marie in Australia.

=== To Australia ===
Stephanie D'Este arrived in Australia in February 1926 aboard the Sierra from San Francisco. From her earliest weeks in the country, newspapers in Australia most often rendered Stephanie D'Este's name as 'Stephanie Deste', the name by which she became known in Australia.

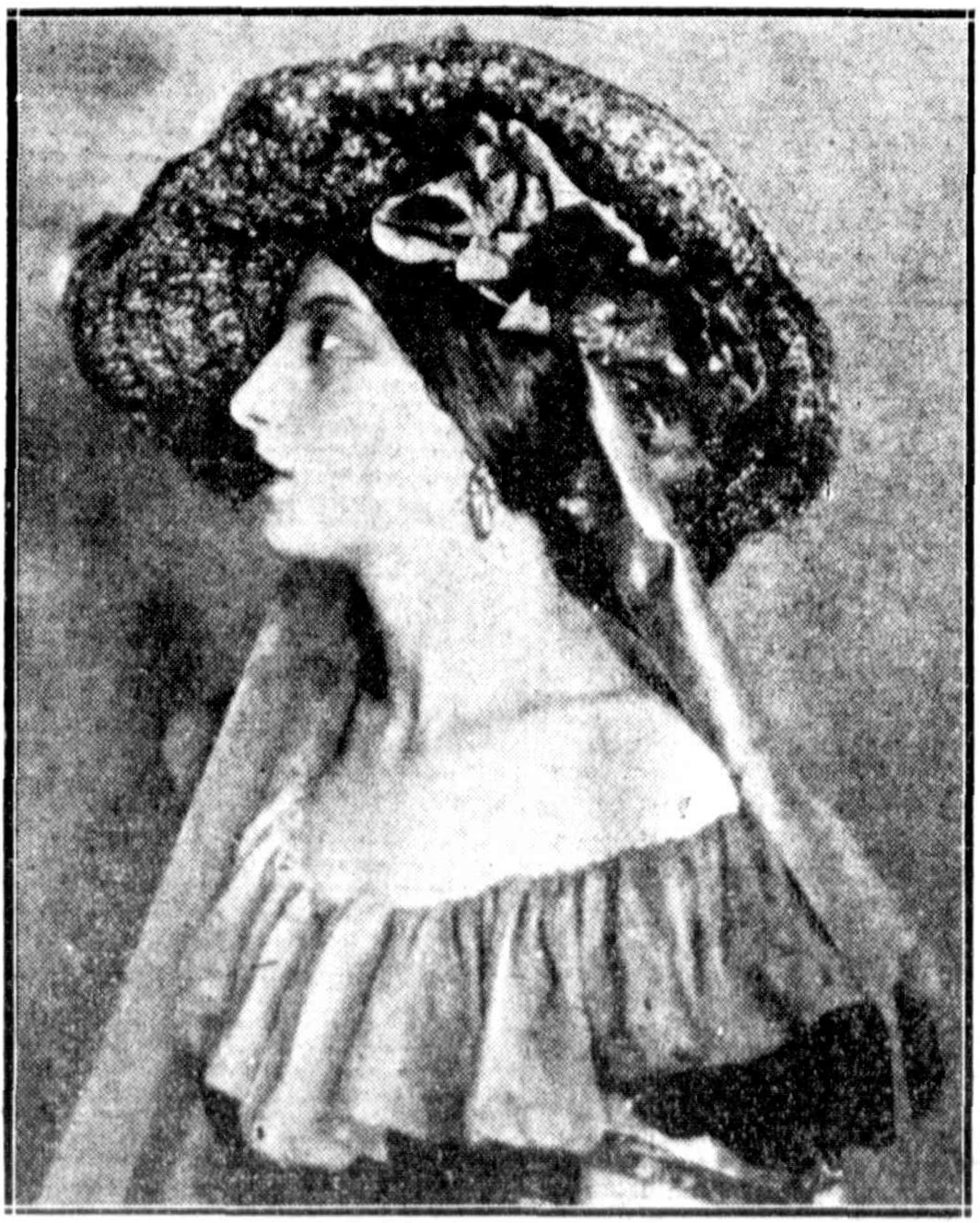
Stephanie Deste as Wanda in Rose-Marie (Brisbane's Telegraph, 5 November 1927).

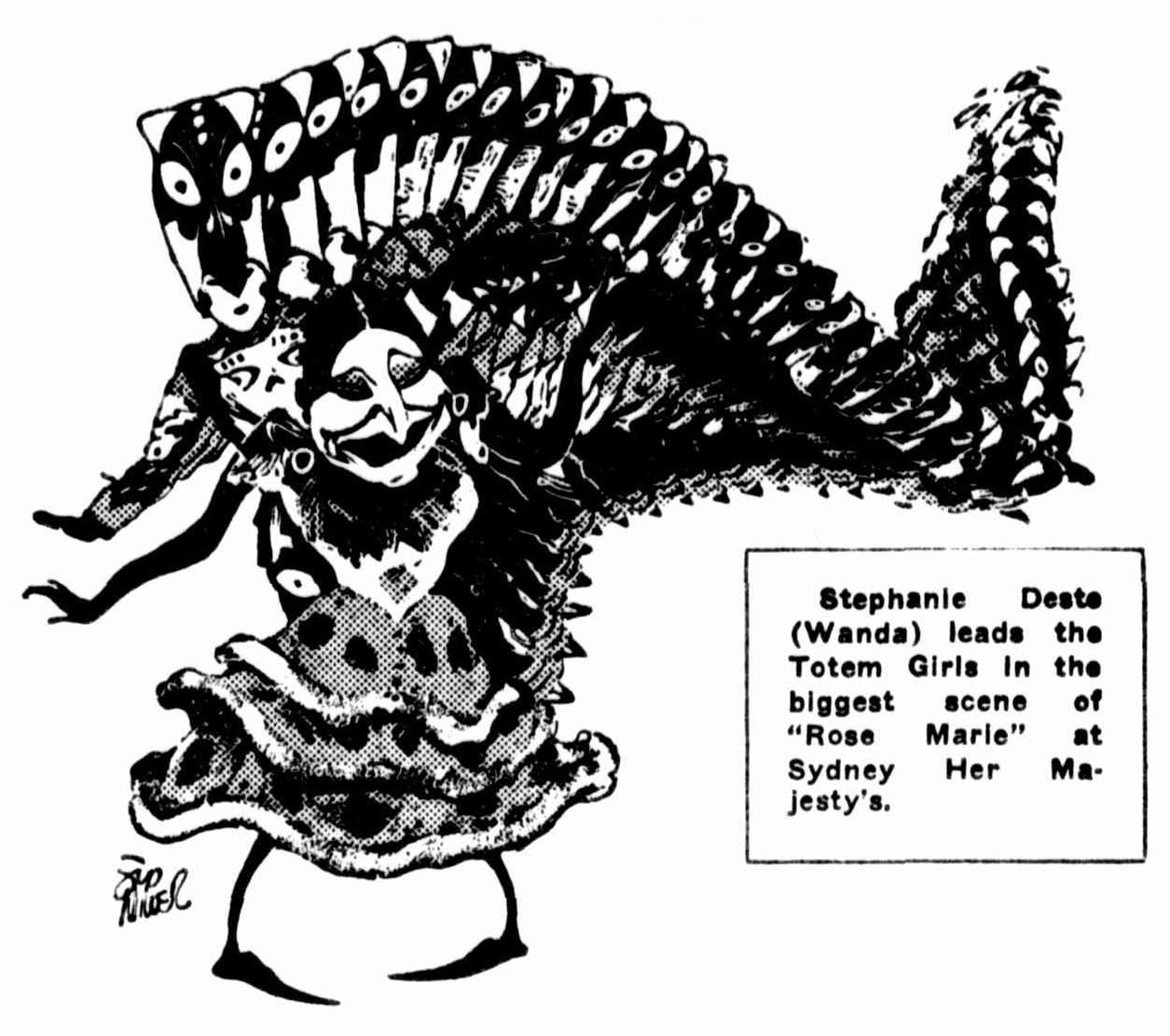
A cartoon by Syd Miller of Stephanie Deste leading "the Totem Girls" in Rose-Marie (Smith's Weekly, 26 June 1926).

Rose-Marie opened in Sydney at His Majesty's Theatre on 29 May 1926. A critic writing for The Sun newspaper described the musical as having "been staged on a scale of such affecting magnificence that serious criticism is disarmed", adding that "the lavishness of the production left the audience blinking through a mist of gratitude". Stephanie Deste's performance "as the half-breed Wanda" was described as "one of the successes of the night". She captured the attention of the audience "with her exotic looks and sensuous dancing". Deste's character performed the 'Totem Tom-Tom' song, which introduced the spectacular 'Totem Pole' ballet. A critic for The Sunday Times described the dancers in the following terms: "So bewilderingly beautiful is it, so dazzling in its kaleidoscopic changes, so startling and breath-catching in the novelty of its evolutions, that one is left gasping".

In August 1926 Stephanie Deste and fellow-actor Arthur Greenaway performed the balcony scene from Romeo and Juliet as part of the 'Daffodil Matinee', a charity event for 'Karitane', an Australian mothercraft society, at the St. James Theatre in Elizabeth Street in Sydney.

The Sydney production of Rose-Marie was an "extraordinary success". In mid-January 1927 it was reported that Rose-Marie had run for 270 nights, with the 1,500-seat Her Majesty's Theatre booked out each night. An article in 1938 recounted the "excitement" caused by Rose-Marie in Sydney during "those comparatively carefree years", when "the totem-pole ballet and Stephanie Deste's fan-dance swept the town". Running from late May 1926 until late February 1927 in Sydney, the musical comedy held the record for the longest run of any play in Australia.

Rose-Marie opened in Melbourne on 26 February 1927 in His Majesty's Theatre in Exhibition Street. A critic who attended the opening night explained that beside the lead characters of Rose-Marie and Herman, the most prominent character in the musical was the "dark-skinned 'vamp'" Wanda, "strikingly portrayed by Miss Stephanie Deste, who dances with rare abandon". With her principal song 'Totem Tom-Tom', Deste introduced the Totem Pole Ballet, made up of fifty young women, who did "their work perfectly" and were comparable with "Ziegfeld's far-famed Follies".

In late March 1927 Deste was broadcast on Radio 3LO from her dressing room prior to a performance of Rose-Marie. Her appearance on 3LO, then owned by the Broadcasting Company of Australia, became a regular feature, performing Bible readings, as well as recitations of poetic, dramatic and literary works. An article in May 1927 of forthcoming highlights on 3LO extolled Deste's "exceptional elocutionary gift", adding that "to hear her recite with a fine succession of pathos, tenderness, and fierce indignation was a revelation of dramatic art". Deste's radio performances were broadcast on 3LO for the duration of the Melbourne season of Rose-Marie. An article published in 1928 titled 'Microphone Fright', discussing artists comfortable with performing in front of an audience but who suffered from nerves "when they face the microphone", included an example of Deste's early radio experience: "Stephanie Deste, who, in a semi-nude make up as 'Wanda' in 'Rose Marie,' faced huge audiences nightly without a sign of nerves, became 'mike stricken' until the ordeal of speaking into the little 'patch of black infinity' had become familiar".

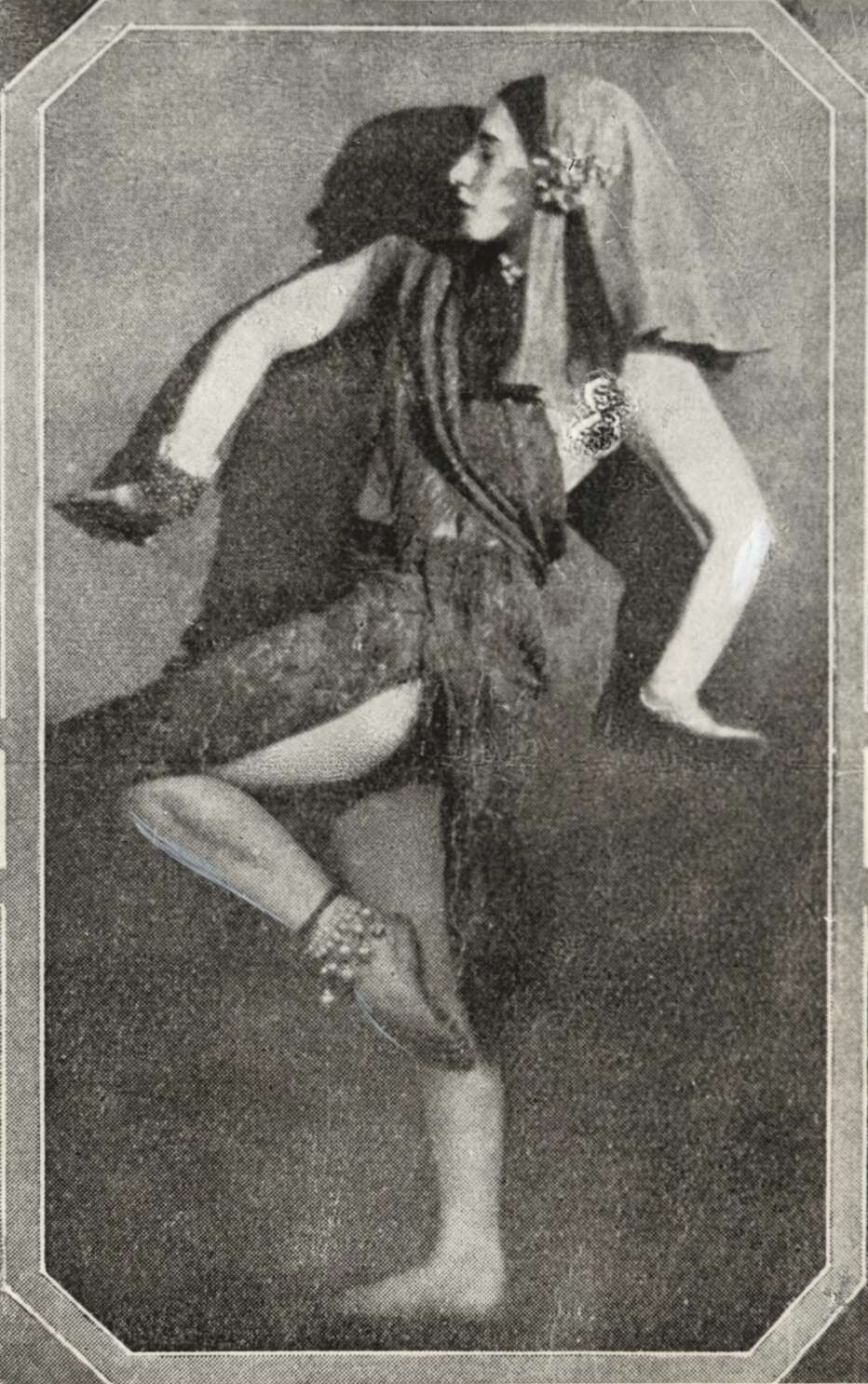
Stephanie Deste as Azuri in The Desert Song (published in 1928).

After a season of 26 weeks the final performance of Rose-Marie in Melbourne was held on 20 August 1927. The musical opened at the Theatre Royal in Adelaide in late August and finished on 1 October 1927. An Adelaide critic wrote the following description of Deste's costume and "her marvellous acrobatic, contortional dancing" in the role of Wanda: "One can see her now, in skirt of long black silk fringes, straps and brassieres of sparkling silver sequins on her bare, lithe, brown body, her shining treacle-black hair drawn straight and tight to a knot behind her head, her deeply dark, inscrutable eyes gazing out on the audience as she folds her apparently boneless body into strange convolutions and sinks, sinks, out of sight beneath the rust-red tinged with golden feathers of a fan so enormous that it completely covers the folded-up body". After Adelaide Rose-Marie travelled to Perth where it was performed during October 1927 to "an enthusiastic and crowded audience". The highly successful Rose-Marie commenced its Brisbane season in November 1927 at His Majesty's Theatre in Queen Street. After Brisbane the Rose-Marie company travelled by train to Newcastle in mid-December 1927, where they played a short season before embarking for New Zealand. After its tour of the Australian States and New Zealand Rose-Marie made a triumphant return to Sydney, opening a farewell season at Her Majesty's Theatre on 3 April 1928. The final night was on May 11, playing to a "packed audience" in a "thoroughly responsive mood, and encores were the order of the evening", during which the Totem Chorus "was recalled eight or ten times".^{[B]}

In May 1928, Deste presented recitals on Radio 2FC in Sydney, including Biblical extracts and The Song of Hiawatha. During June Deste performed in a revue staged by the Kelso brothers called Ace High, playing at the Tivoli Theatre in Sydney. Her performance featured "her famous fan dance" from Rose-Marie. In July a short return season of Rose-Marie, of five nights and a Saturday matinee, was performed in Brisbane.

Stephanie Deste was engaged for the role of the sensuous 'Azuri' in J. C. Williamson's Australian production of the operetta The Desert Song, which premiered on 15 September 1928 at His Majesty's Theatre in Melbourne.

While she was performing in Melbourne Deste met Remigio Budica, a Jewish-Italian restaurateur and former opera baritone who had arrived in Australia in 1922 and had become an Australian citizen by 1928. Budica had been a cadet-officer who had left his ship at Portland and hitch-hiked to Melbourne, where he established the Esperia Café in Exhibition Street.

During her time in Melbourne, Deste resumed presenting dramatic recitations and Bible readings on 3LO. On 4 December 1928 Act II of The Desert Song, featuring the cast members from the stage production, was broadcast on 3LO from 9.30 to 11.10 p.m. On Sunday night, 3 February 1929, a "special representation" of Oscar Wilde's Salome was broadcast on Radio 3AR, produced by Deste. The presentation was a shortened rendering of the play, assisted by Herbert Browne and Colin Crane from The Desert Song company.

After its Melbourne season ended The Desert Song opened in Her Majesty's Theatre in Sydney on 30 March 1929. A critic writing in the Sunday Times commented on Deste's performance of the Azuri character: "Her work is extraordinarily realistic, her acting finished, and her dancing sinuous and expressive", adding that "she has the unusual quality of inspiring admiration tinged with just that touch of repugnance which the character calls for".

Deste left Australia in mid-May 1929 to travel to London on the P&O steamer Mooltan (with the intention, at the time, of travelling from there to America). Her role as Azuri in The Desert Song was taken up by Sonia Rosova, a dancer from New York.

=== Europe ===
In about September 1930, Deste organised the staging of a French language version of the musical comedy Chu Chin Chow at the Casino in Brussels. Deste designed the dresses, engaged the cast, rehearsed and produced the play in conjunction with the ballet mistress and stage manager from His Majesty's Theatre on London, using the scenery and properties from the long-running original London version of the play.

In 1931, Remigo Budica travelled from Australia to England aboard the Ballarat passenger ship, arriving in London on 4 June 1931. Stephanie Deste and Budica were married in the St. Martin district of London later that year. The couple had a daughter named Toti, born in Paris in 1932.

During her period in Europe, Deste performed in Rose-Marie and The Desert Song in Belgium, the Netherlands and France. After her return to Melbourne in 1936 Deste remarked that wherever she played The Desert Song or Rose-Marie in Europe "there seemed to be Australians in the audience, who came after the show to speak to me". During one of her performances in The Hague Deste was "startled to hear a 'Coo-ee' suddenly in the audience". The actress commented: "Dutch audiences are very prim and proper, and the whole house as one man, wheeled round in their seats to fix the culprit with a reproving look", adding "I myself faltered for a moment in my song".

While she was working in Paris, Deste "spent most of her leisure studying modern methods of beauty culture". She studied at the Antoine School and attained a degree "as a practitioner of medical electricity", which involved her attendance at clinics in dermatology and plastic surgery at the Laennec Hospital. After her later return to Melbourne, advertisements for Deste's beauty clinic business stated that she had gained the following qualifications in Paris: the Antoine Diploma, the Certificate De Stage Laennec Hospital and the Diploma of the Dr. Peytoureau Clinic of Plastic Surgery. Deste also used the initials "E.F.O.M." after her name (École Française d’Orthopédie et de Massage; French School of Orthopedics and Massage), a private institution formed in Paris in 1889 for the training of health professionals.

=== Return to Melbourne ===
Stephanie Deste returned to Australia in August 1936 after five years in Europe.

During January and February 1937, Deste presented "dramatic readings" on the Australian Broadcasting Corporation's radio station 3AR in Melbourne.

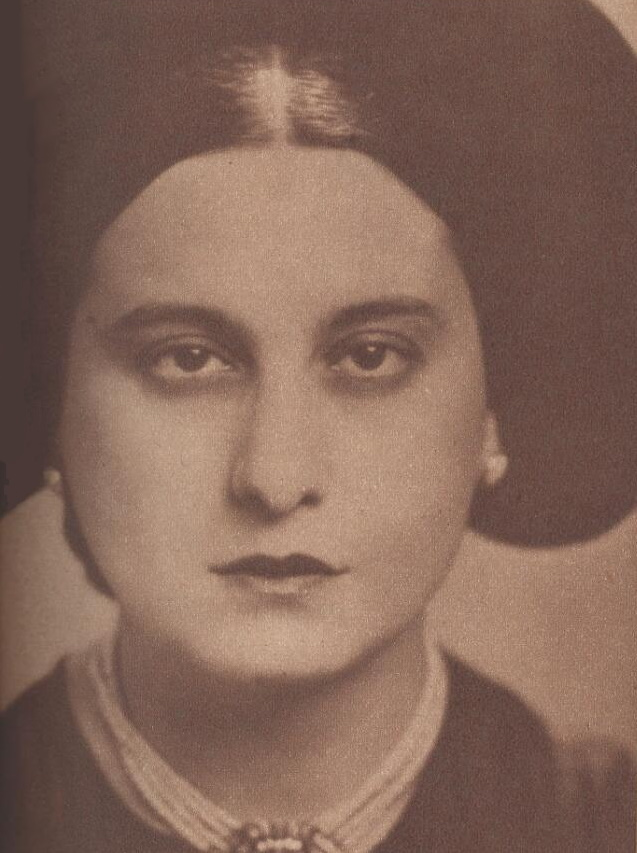
Portrait of Stephanie Deste, published in The Wireless Weekly in February 1937.

In June 1937, Deste met with Doris Winter (Rourke), a well-known beauty specialist in Melbourne who operated a salon called 'Make-Ups' in Collins Street (under the company Make-Ups Pty. Ltd.).^{[C]} Deste and Rourke agreed to form a new company, Stephanie Deste Pty. Ltd. (incorporated in August 1937 with both parties as joint shareholders), to operate a business giving beauty treatments specialising in "the removal of superfluous hair by diathermy" (but also including the removal of warts and moles and the treatment of acne). The 'Stephanie Deste Beauty Clinic' was located on the fourth floor of the newly built Presgrave Building at 273 Little Collins Street in Melbourne. In her clinic Deste used a recent method for permanent hair removal devised by Dr. Simon-Alban Peytoureau, using a short-wave diathermy device (described as an "electro-coagulation machine") to improve the thermolysis process for destroying the hair follicle. Short-wave diathermy was faster and less painful than the older galvanic electrolysis method of permanent hair removal. Deste initially gave all the treatments at the new establishment, with the assistance of an apprentice.

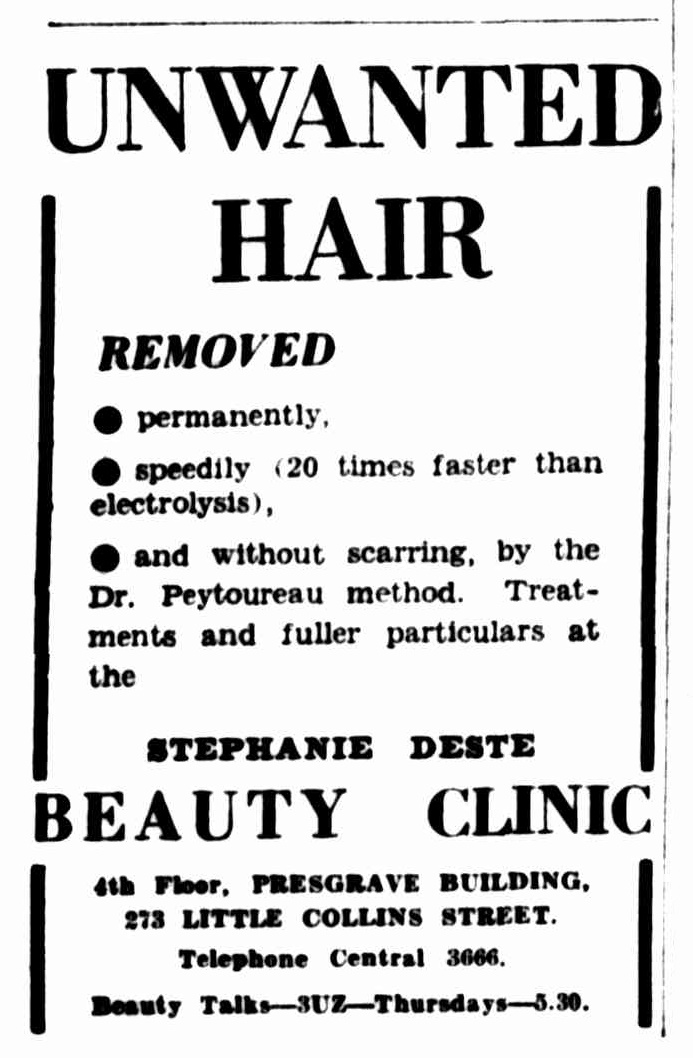
Advertisement for the Stephanie Deste Beauty Clinic, Little Collins Street in Melbourne (December 1938).

From September 1937, Deste presented a segment on "Modern Make Up" and "Beauty Hints" on Radio 3KZ. From January 1938 she also presented a short session of beauty tips and advice on Radio 3UZ.

The partnership between Deste and Rourke proceeded amicably at first, with only minor disagreements arising. Mid-way through 1938 Deste told her partner she intended to take the role of Wanda in the Melbourne performances of a revival of Rose-Marie, maintaining "that the publicity she would gain would assist the business". Rourke "agreed reluctantly", but stipulated that Deste should teach her assistant the electrolysis treatment and also attend the business no later than 10 a.m. each day during the period of the performances.

J. C. Williamson's revival of Rose-Marie opened at His Majesty's Theatre in Melbourne on 25 June 1938, with Deste again playing the role of Wanda. After the Melbourne season finished, Rose-Marie opened in Sydney in mid-August 1938 at the Theatre Royal, with Deste replaced by Gwen Browne in the role of Wanda.

During the period of rehearsals and performances of Rose-Marie in Melbourne, "serious disputes" had arisen between Deste and Rourke, resulting in "a state of mutual distrust". Doris Rourke later claimed that Deste "frequently arrived at the business premises in an exhausted condition" and did not provided adequate supervision of the staff. Rourke also asserted that a weight loss required by Deste for her role "affected her health and her ability to perform treatments". Deste countered by claiming that during this period Rourke "attempted to usurp" her position of manager of her clinic "by giving orders to the staff in the presence of customers". Rourke also installed another electro-coagulation machine at her own 'Make-Ups' salon, in an apparent attempt to take business away from her partner.

In December 1938, Deste applied to the Victorian Practice Court seeking to have the company Stephanie Deste Pty. Ltd. wound up, stating that the animosity that had developed between the partners "precluded all hope of friendly co-operation". After considering the affidavits and evidence from both parties the judge adjourned the matter until the following February, on the understanding that Deste be permitted to make appointments and treat patients in the company's clinic without control from Rourke or her husband, and also to continue to make radio broadcasts on behalf of the company. For her part, Rourke undertook to restrict her role to the provision of supplies and the payment of accounts. The proposed February hearing was further adjourned until eventually, in May 1939, Deste withdrew her petition to wind up the beauty parlour business of Stephanie Deste Pty. Ltd. Her business partner, Doris Rourke, consented to the withdrawal on the condition that Deste give "an undertaking that nothing that had occurred in the past would be used by her in support of any future petition".

In 1940, Deste's beauty clinic was located at 82 Elizabeth Street (at the corner with Collins Street, known as Altson's Corner). The clinic specialised in the removal of "unwanted hair" ("Destroyed for ever by Diathermy"). Clients were offered a consultation with "Miss Deste in person" at no charge. She continued to operate from that location until at least September 1947.

During the war years, Deste was featured on radio stations 3AW and 3DB in Melbourne, providing beauty advice and utilising these segments to promote her salon. In April 1941 Deste presented a rendition of 'David of Judah' as part of the special Easter programs on radio station 3UZ.

Stephanie Deste's husband, Remigio Budica, died in September 1944 of tuberculosis, aged 45 years. He was buried in the Melbourne Cemetery at Carlton.

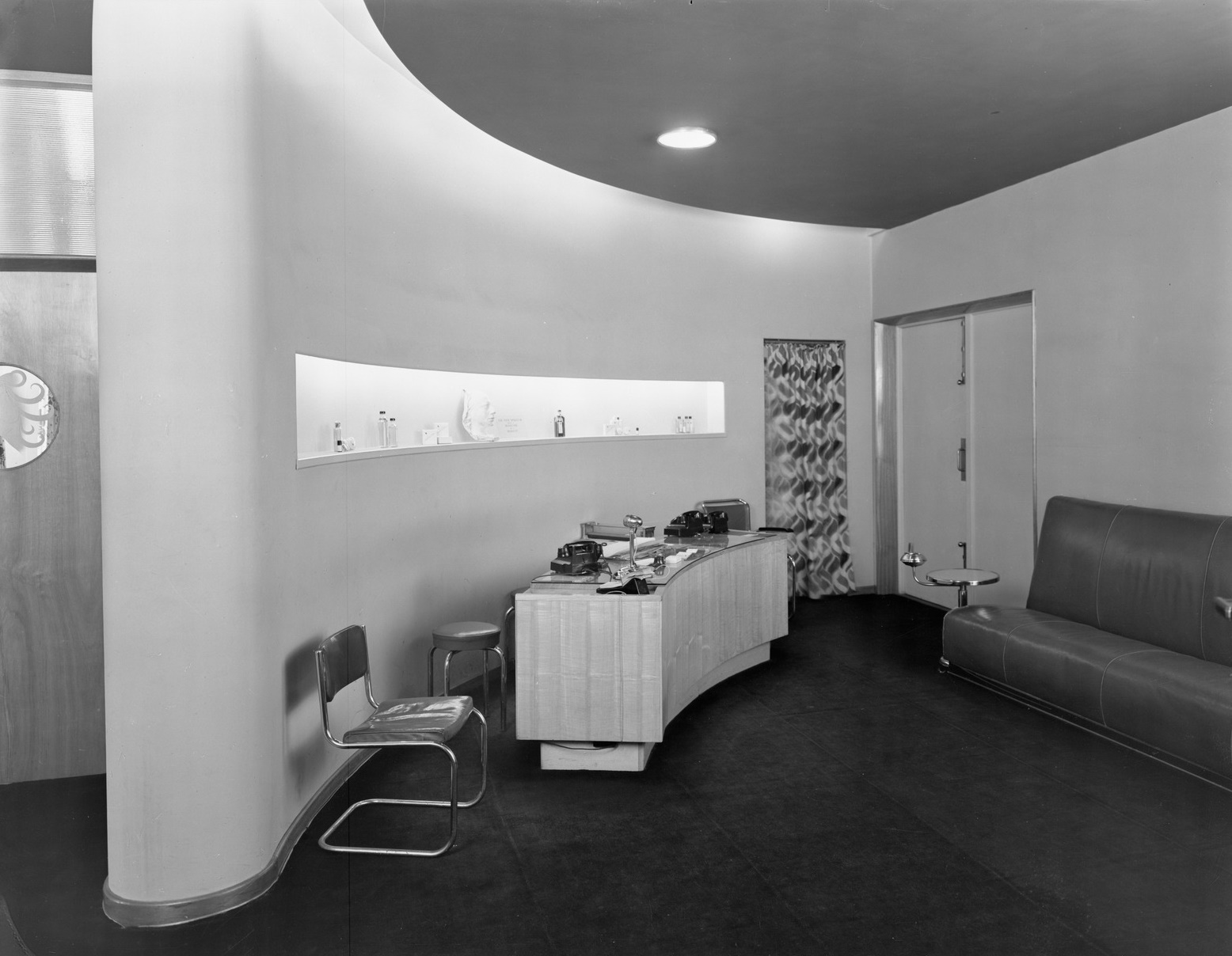
The entrance and reception area of the Stephanie Deste Beauty Lodge at 59 Elizabeth Street in Melbourne, photographed in 1948.

In February 1945, Deste appeared on the stage at His Majesty's Theatre in Melbourne in a revival of the role of Azuri in The Desert Song. Eleven year-old Barry Humphries and his mother were in the audience of one of the performances of The Desert Song. Humphries recalled in 1972 that Deste "did a terribly sexy, voluptuous dance, practically a strip it was; I've never got over it to this day". Despite the show's "enormous success" The Desert Song closed in late June 1945.

During the 'Australia Makes It' trade show, an exhibition of Australian manufacturers and their products held at the Melbourne Exhibition Buildings in June 1947, Deste presented a floor show titled "A Revolution in Hairdressing", where she demonstrated the Marigny cold-wave perm process for creating waves and curls in the hair. At the conclusion of the demonstration "free hair-do's" were given to audience members. The distinctive hairstyle worn by the Swedish actress Ingrid Bergman in her lead role in the film Joan of Arc (a short bob cut into page-boy style), sparked a fashion trend in Britain and Europe after the film's release in November 1948. An article in the Melbourne Argus in December 1949, describing the hairstyle and its growing popularity in Australia, included a photograph of a young woman being "given an Ingrid Bergman hair cut" in the "Melbourne salon of Stephanie Deste".

By July 1948, Deste's business, known as the 'Stephanie Deste Beauty Lodge', was located in the Brooks Robinson Building at 59 Elizabeth Street in Melbourne.

From March 1949 until the late 1960s, Deste presented regular sessions of 'Beauty Talk' on 3DB as part of that station's morning program. From 1954 to 1971 Deste interviewed show business personalities as host of 3DB's Sunday Night with Stephanie Deste at 10.30 p.m. on a Sunday night.^{[D]}. She also made regular television appearances on the HSV7 television station.

=== Later years ===
In March 1973, Deste returned to the stage for a brief season of Façade, a production by the Victorian Opera Company at the Comedy Theatre in Melbourne. Façade, a presentation of a series of poems by Edith Sitwell recited over a musical accompaniment by William Walton, was presented during the Moomba community festival in Melbourne on a double bill with the surrealist operetta The Breasts of Tiresias.

By 1976, Deste's business premises at 59 Elizabeth Street had 40 employees and specialised in superfluous hair removal, cosmetics and hairdressing. By the 1970s Deste was a well-known flamboyant figure in Melbourne, often attending first night theatre events in the company of the journalist, broadcaster and theatre personality Barry Balmer.

Stephanie Deste was a woman of striking features well into old age, known as one of Melbourne's "great personalities, an elegantly dressed, immaculately coiffured figure known to several generations for her stage and radio work and for her famous beauty salons". Her lively character and personal style "earned her a reputation as a Melbourne eccentric".

== Death ==
Stephanie Deste died on 14 April 1996 in the Cabrini Hospital in the Melbourne suburb of Malvern, aged 95 years. She was buried in the Springvale cemetery.

== Cultural influence ==
Robert Helpmann cited Deste as one of the early influences over his dancing and acting career. Early in his career Helpmann performed an imitation of Stephanie Deste's dancing style in Rose-Marie. In a revue called Happy Days at St. James Theatre in October 1930 he "gave an excellent imitation" of the dancer, reproducing her mannerisms "such as her curious style of walking with her toes turned in". Deste herself provided encouragement and advice to the young dancer, reputedly teaching Helpmann "the circular splits" and loaning him "her costume and fan".

Barry Humphries claimed that Deste was one of the inspirations behind his most famous character, Dame Edna Everage, most particularly in regard to Dame Edna's flamboyant spectacle frames. In an interview in 1976, Deste acknowledged her influence on Humphries, who had dubbed her "the nation's depilator". She confirmed that Humphries had copied Edna Everage's glasses from her own characteristic diamante-studded winged spectacles.

== Notes ==
A.In May 1926 Aloma of the South Seas was released as a silent film, with Gilda Gray in the title role as the exotic dancer Aloma. The film was the highest grossing film of 1926 and the fourth most successful film of the 1920s.
B.Rose-Marie became so successful in Australia that by November 1927 J. C. Williamson Ltd. had put together a separate touring company to take the musical to Australian country centres.
C.Doris Irene Winter married John Rourke in 1936. In her public persona as an advisor on cosmetics and beauty regimes and as a clinic manager she was known as Doris Winter, but in her legal dealings with Stephanie Deste she was referred to as her married name of Doris Rourke.
D.As from 1 February 1954, 3DB began broadcasting 24 hours per day. Prior to this, the station had closed at 10.30 pm on Sundays. 24 hour broadcasting at 3DB only lasted for a few months, and after this 3DB began closing at 1.00 am every morning. Every evening, a two-hour program called "The Dunlop Hours, Eleven 'til One" was broadcast after 11.00 pm. This meant that as from 1 February 1954, there was a half-hour gap in programming after 10.30 pm on Sundays, which is why Stephanie Deste was able to get this time-slot at very cheap rates. For more information on 3DB's broadcasting hours, go to 3DB and scroll down to 2.1 On air times.
