= Michael Schildberger =

Australian journalist and presenter (1938–2010)

- Born: Michael Julius Schildberger; 4 April 1938; Berlin, Germany
- Died: 2 June 2010 (aged 72); Prahran, Victoria, Australia
- Education: Melbourne Grammar School
- Occupations: Journalist, broadcaster
- Years active: 1955–2010
- Known for: Host of A Current Affair
- Spouse: Julia (deceased)
- Children: 5
- Awards: Logie: Best TV interviewer (1976)

Michael Julius Schildberger (4 April 1938 – 2 June 2010) was an Australian journalist, radio and television presenter, and author. He is best known for hosting A Current Affair in the 1970s.

He was the son of Hermann Schildberger. Hermann had had an important musical career in Berlin prior to being brought out to Melbourne in 1939 by Rabbi Dr Herman Sanger, to escape the Nazis. He was accompanied by two his wife (check name) and by Michael who was then a babe-in-arms.

Hermann became musical director of Temple Beth Israel in St. Kilda upon arrival in Melbourne in 1939, as well as taking on a number of other important musical roles including being the founding musical director of the Camberwell Chorale.

== Career ==
Michael Schildberger began his media career in 1955 when he joined The Sun News-Pictorial as a copy boy and subsequently became a cadet reporter.

In 1958 he moved to GTV 9 where he remained for the next twenty years. During the 1970s he was executive producer and national host of A Current Affair. For that role, he was awarded a 1976 Logie Award for Best TV Interviewer. While at A Current Affair he conducted the first full-length television interview with singer-songwriter Neil Diamond, who had only previously done brief group press conferences. The interview was in conjunction with Diamond's 1975-76 "Thank You Australia" tour and nationally broadcast live concert.

After leaving Channel 9, Schildberger worked for several years as Director of News for ATV 10 and FOX-FM. He then moved to Melbourne radio station 3LO where he hosted the morning program, with a short stint at 3DB.

In 1984 he founded the media production company Business Essentials.

Schildberger was diagnosed with prostate cancer in 1997. He achieved remission, and became a strong advocate of positron emission tomography. The cancer returned in early 2010. Schildberger died at the Cabrini Hospital in Prahran on 2 June 2010.

== Publications ==
- The sorcerer's apprentice. Spectrum. 2000. ISBN 0-86786-300-5.
- Secrets of success. Information Australia. 2000. ISBN 1-86350-319-6.
