= George Andrew (Australian footballer) =

Australian rules footballer, born 1917

Personal information
- Full name: George William Andrew
- Born: 5 October 1917; Northcote, Victoria
- Died: 26 December 1987 (aged 70); East Melbourne, Victoria
- Original team: Parkdale
- Height: 182 cm (6 ft 0 in)
- Weight: 73 kg (161 lb)
- Position: Forward

Playing career^{1}
Years	Club	Games (Goals)
1938	St Kilda	9 (17)
- ^{1} Playing statistics correct to the end of 1938.

George William Andrew (5 October 1917 – 26 December 1987) was an Australian rules footballer who played with St Kilda in the Victorian Football League (VFL).

He was a nephew of another footballer, Bruce Andrew.

In 1950, George Andrew, along with Ron Casey, became part of 3DB's original football commentary team. He left 3DB in 1956 and joined 3UZ's sale team.
