= 3AK =

Coordinates: 37°44′45″S 145°6′33″E

Licence of 1116 SEN
- Melbourne, Victoria; Australia
- Broadcast area: Melbourne RA1
- Frequencies: AM: 1116 kHz; DAB+: 9A Melbourne

Programming
- Language: English (1990–1994: Italian)

History
- First air date: 29 November 1931
- Last air date: 18 January 2004 (as 3AK)
- Former frequencies: 1500 kHz (1931–1978); 1503 kHz (1978–2001)
- Call sign meaning: Akron Tyre Co

1503 3AK was a popular music radio station dating back to the 1930s. The station is no longer active. It was sold in the 2000s several times, switched to 1116AM frequency and eventually bought by the current owners Sports and Entertainment Network SEN 1116. A number of unusual events and precedents throughout the station's history make its story of interest.

These include:

- In lieu of a "C" class licence, the granting of a "B" class licence in 1931, but with limiting conditions including: a position on the dial that could not be picked up by most contemporary radio sets; only allowed to broadcast when other Melbourne commercial stations were off the air, that is, most of the time only at night; limited power.
- The founder of the station was George Palmer, the father of Clive Palmer.
- The sharing of its wavelength with 2BS Bathurst, a station that was comparatively close geographically, thus causing interference problems.
- From 1954, permitted to broadcast during daylight hours, but only when its signal was perceived not to interfere with that of 2BS.
- Purchased in 1961 by Australian Consolidated Press and thus became sister station of GTV-9. Most high-profile GTV personalities also broadcast on 3AK.
- When some FM licences were auctioned off to existing AM stations in 1989, 3AK became one of the two successful Melbourne bidders, but the station did not take up the offer because of ownership changes.
- In 1990, purchased by Peter Corso. 3AK thus became an Italian language station for some years.
- In late 2003 the 3AK license was leased to Sports Entertainment Network and from January 2004 it became a 24-hour sports station, using the on-air name SEN whilst having to retain 3AK as its official callsign.

== History ==
=== Early years ===
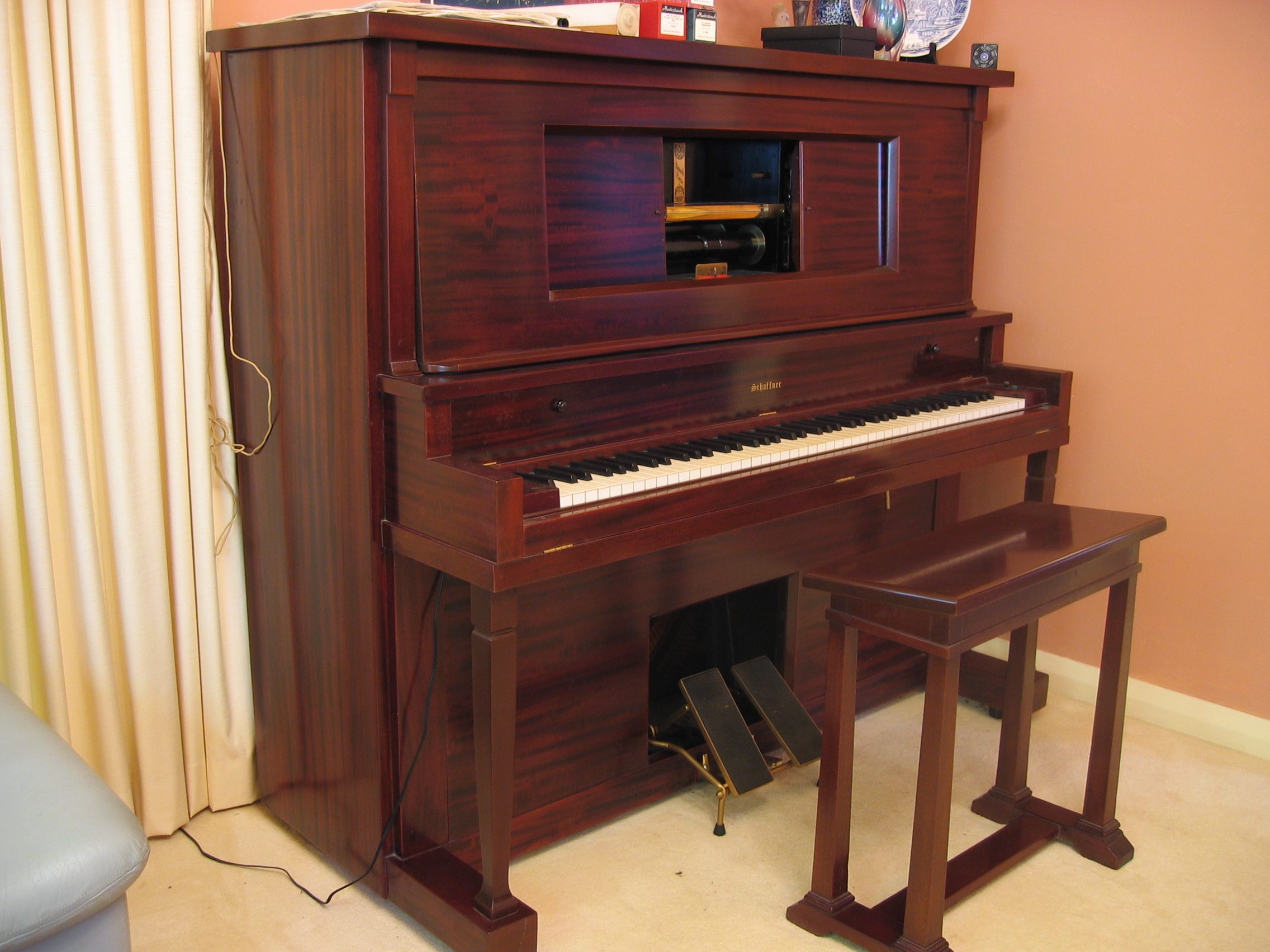
A restored pneumatic player piano of the type that could well have been used in 3AK's first studio.

3AK commenced broadcasting on 29 November 1931, the fourth commercial radio station in Melbourne after 3UZ, 3DB and 3KZ.

The station's call-sign came from the name of its operating company, the Akron Broadcasting Company. The owner of the Akron Tyre Co and of 3AK was George Palmer, the father of Clive Palmer.

At the time of its formation there were three types of broadcasters in Australia, A Class stations (most of which later evolved into the Australian Broadcasting Corporation); B Class stations, which are now known as commercial stations; amateurs. There were also government plans for a set of C class stations which were intended to be used by businesses to exclusively advertise their products. However it was decided not to proceed with this type of license before 3AK was actually granted its licence. Akron and the Postmaster-General's Department had originally discussed the issuance of such a license, but in lieu, a B Class licence with a number of restrictions, was issued to Akron.

From the outset, 3AK was only permitted to broadcast for limited hours when other Melbourne stations were off the air. 3AK originally broadcast from 11.30 pm to 2.00 am daily; 5.00 to 7.00 am Monday-Saturday; 1.00 to 2.00 pm Saturday; 12.30 to 2.30 pm Sunday. The three hours of weekend afternoon broadcasting were shared with amateurs on the MW (medium wave) band. 3AK also had limited power, which although frequently altered was usually about 20% of that given to other B Class stations in Melbourne. 3AK's wavelength of 1500 KC could also be seen as a third limiting factor - it was at the very end of most contemporary radio dials; there were still some radio sets that were unable to receive it.

Most of 3AK's early broadcasts consisted of live concerts from its studio in Queen Street. These were provided free of charge by a number of progressive Melbourne music teachers who believed that radio would help promote both them and their students. These concerts were occasionally interspersed with broadcasts of recordings (both 78 rpm/80 rpm gramophone records and piano rolls).

=== Melbourne Broadcasters ===
On 2 May 1934, the name of the company was changed to Melbourne Broadcasters Pty Ltd, a name that persisted throughout many major changes of management and was still being used as late as the 1980s. At this time Palmer changed the style of the station by introducing a format that mainly consisted of dance music, then very popular.

A listing of all Melbourne radio announcers published in February 1936 shows that George Palmer gave himself announcing duties, as well as managing the station. He was assisted by only two other announcers, F Bibby and T Lelliott. This small announcing staff puts 3AK's lowly status in the 1930s and 1940s into context - the same list of Melbourne announcers shows that each of the five other commercial stations had either nine or 10 announcers each and the ABC is shown as employing 13 announcers in Melbourne to cover its two local stations (although this would have been supplemented by interstate announcers, because of the number of relays that were then taken).

In 1937 3AK was allowed to extend its hours of broadcast to 11.30 pm-7.00 am, however the station still closed at 3.00 am on Sundays. It still broadcast for three hours on Saturday and Sunday afternoons, even though amateurs were no longer permitted to do so after 1939. 3AK's hours of broadcast remained unaltered until 1954.

2BS Bathurst commenced broadcasting on 1 January 1937. Because of 3AK's low power, 2BS was given the same wavelength (1500 kHz) and, within a few years, both stations suffered from interference during the few hours when they were simultaneously on the air.

One of 3AK's major personalities in the late 1930s/early 1940s was Alf Andrew who began broadcasting from 3AK in March 1937. Although a controversial character, Andrew had been a pioneer broadcaster at 3LO, commencing there in 1925 before going to 3UZ and then 2UW and a few other stations.

During the 1930s, 1940s and 1950s, the station's slogan was "3AK - The Voice of the Night". However, unsubstantiated rumours about both drunkenness and the poor wages of the staff led to some referring to the station as "3AK - The Voice of the TIGHT".

In the 1930s, the postmaster general gave one station in the Canberra, Sydney, Brisbane and Adelaide markets a licence to broadcast 24 hours a day. Because 3AK broadcast at night, Melbourne did not get any such 24-hour licences until as late as 1 February 1954 when 3UZ, 3DB and 3XY all began continuous broadcasting. This was concurrent with 3AK changing its hours of broadcast (see below). Within six months 3XY had become Melbourne's only 24-hour station.

In this same era, 3AK moved its studio from Queen Street to Bourke Street. By the 1950s it had again been resited and was to be found in the upper storey of a bank in Grey Street, St Kilda.

In the 1930s, 1940s and 1950s, 3AK provided an alternative to country radio, then the accepted place to commence a broadcasting career, many of 3AK's early staff going on to become well known at major stations, e.g. Stan Rofe, Mike Williamson, Hal Todd, John Worthy, John Eden and John Hart.

At the time very few stations had newsrooms and most relied on newspapers for their news. Due to its poor financial situation, 3AK is believed to have devised a novel system of getting its news – the station had a rope dangling from their studio into the adjoining lane-way and the first newspaper firm to tie their morning edition onto the rope had it read on air.

By the late 1940s, 3AK had been purchased by Mack's Furnishing Company. At this stage, both of the directors, the station's manager, Vernon Margetts and the studio manager Ray Benn held conservative Christian beliefs that were reflected in 3AK's program schedule.

=== 1950s ===
For many years, 3AK management had been lobbying the Postmaster General's Department and, then, the Australian Broadcasting Control Board for an increase to its permitted broadcasting hours. Eventually, 3AK was allowed to broadcast during those daylight hours when it was thought that it would not interfere with transmissions from 2BS. From 1 February 1954, 3AK was permitted to broadcast from 6.00 am to 7.00 pm daily. However, 2BS still experienced difficulties during the summer, and so, for 4 or 5 months per year, 3AK could not broadcast until 7.00 am, and had to close as early as 5.00 pm. Until the introduction of television in Australia in 1956, the peak hours for any radio station were 7.00 pm-10.00 pm, so 3AK was never able to take advantage of this peak listening period.

When 3AK became a "daylight" station, its very first breakfast team was Lennie Holmes and Shin Berinson. Holmes went on to become a well-known radio and television comedian. After changing his first name to Jim, Berinson became one of the most sought-after and well-paid voice-over men. The breakfast program was later compered by Lou Carr. Another notable announcer during that era was Graham Madison.

=== 1960s ===
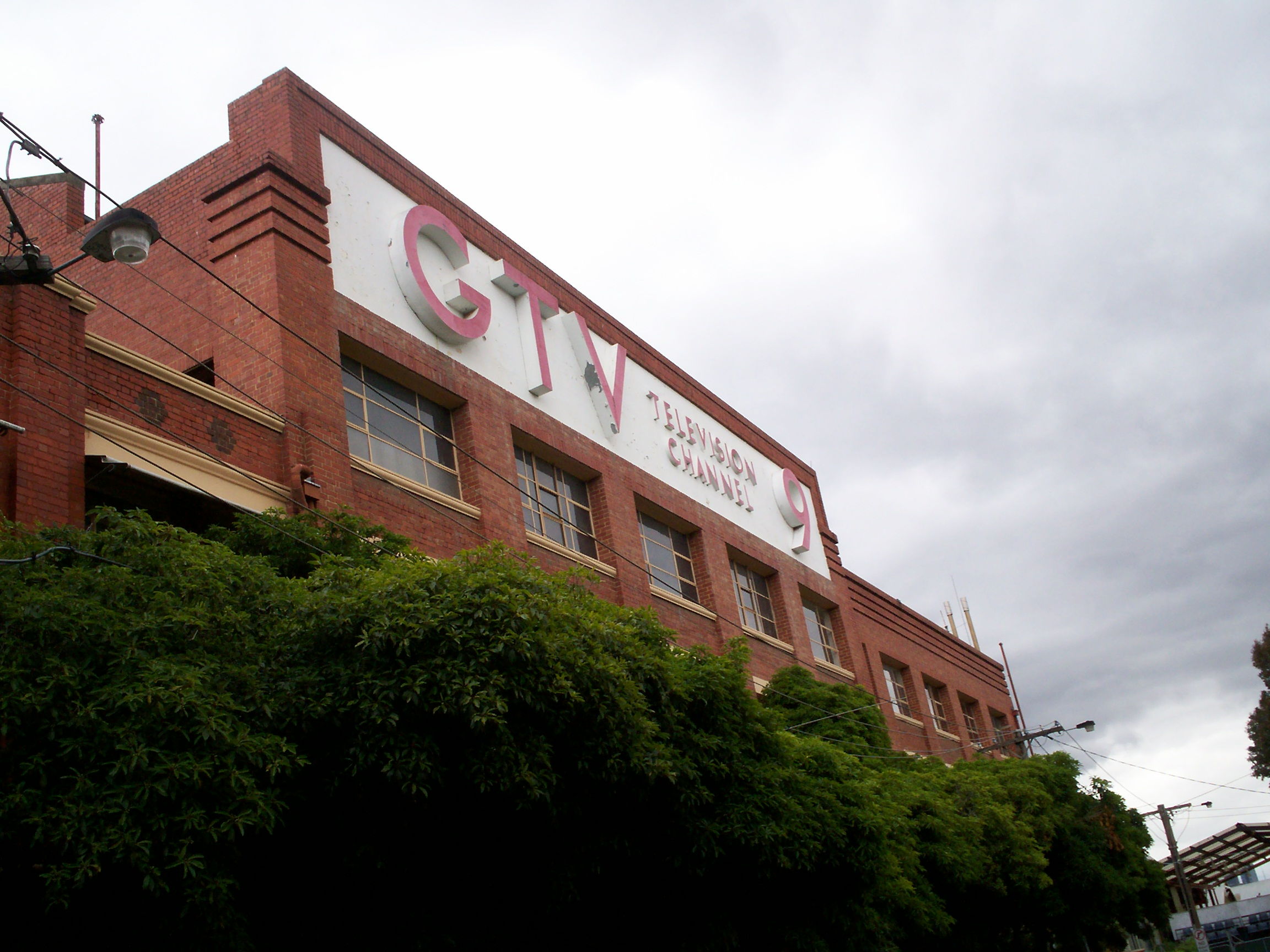
The former GTV-9 "Television City" premises in Richmond which also housed the 3AK studio, from 1961 to 1991

In the early 1960s Australian Consolidated Press (ACP), owned by the Packer family, took over both television station GTV-9 and, a little later, 3AK. 3AK moved from its small St. Kilda studio into GTV-9's Television City premises at Bendigo Street, Richmond, broadcasting a revised format from Easter Monday, 3 April 1961. GTV's major television personalities were forced to broadcast from 3AK. Therefore, overnight, 3AK changed from a station with a young and virtually unknown announcing staff, to one featuring some of Australia's best-known television personalities, including Philip Brady, Geoff Corke, Tommy Hanlon Jr., Geoff Hiscock, Graham Kennedy, Jack Little, Bert Newton, Eric Pearce, Brian Taylor, Hal Todd, Eric Welch, Arthur Young and Frank Zepter. In talking about the use of high-profile celebrities on 3AK, Philip Brady is quoted as saying: "They expected us to do it for nothing". Even so, Philip Brady was one of the few GTV personalities without previous radio experience. Despite his claim that he had always loved radio, his first job in the media was with GTV, as from 1958.

Frank Zepter was actually more of a GTV-9 backroom person than a TV personality. He presented a weekend Italian language program on 3AK. Arthur Young was also heard on 3AK at weekends - he was the leader of GTV-9's studio orchestra and presented a classical music program on 3AK. (This was an era when commercial radio stations were easing out of broadcasting classical music, but a small amount of it was still usually considered de rigueur at weekends. Prior to the ACP takeover, 3AK had broadcast quite a bit of classical music.)

Former 3AK manager Bill Bowie resigned and formed his own radio/television school. Former 3AK announcers (Ron Alderton, Terry Calder, Peter Cavanagh, John Print) were redeployed with the GTV organisation; only the former chief announcer, Ron Alderton, retaining any on-air work at 3AK, albeit only at weekends. Alderton later made his name as a TV newsreader, particularly at ATV-0/10. Peter Cavanagh was to make a name for himself as a TV actor, particularly in a number of Hector Crawford Production's police dramas.

During the mid-1960s, 3AK's program format shifted to Top 40 music with the slogan "The Good Guys".

ACP was always keen to solve the problem of transmission hours caused by 2BS and 3AK sharing the same wavelength. Technology in the form of a directional antenna (at 2BS) seemed to be the answer, but this small country station was deaf to ACP's continuous requests, leading to ACP's purchase of 2BS, allowing them to install such an antenna. By October 1968 permission which enabled 3AK to commence 24-hour transmission had been granted. 3AK officially launched 24-hour broadcasting at 7.00pm on Friday, 8 November 1968. The station's first overnight announcer was Grantley Dee.

=== 1970s–1980s ===
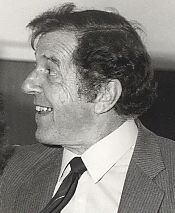
Politician Don Chipp who joined 3AK as a talk-back host in 1988

In the early 1970s "The Good Guys" slogan was replaced by "Where No Wrinklys Fly". During this period there was a head-on battle for the lucrative Top 40 market between 3XY (managed by Rod Muir) and Rhett Walker's 3AK. The fact that 3XY won the battle is reflected in 3AK's rapid change from Top 40 to Beautiful music, a predecessor to today's Easy listening music format. The last announcer to work under the "Wrinkly" format was Mike Nicholls. The last song played was Australian rock band Spectrum's "I'll Be Gone".

The new format paid dividends for 3AK as it took it to the top of the ratings where it remained for over a decade. A feature of the early days of 3AK's Beautiful Music format was that it stopped advertising the names of its on-air personalities, claiming that the format was important but not the announcers. (Sister Beautiful Music station 2CH [Sydney] had a similar policy.)

3AK continued with slight variations of a broadly easy listening sound well into the 1980s. Some changes were also made to the promotional aspects of the station. Use of the words "Beautiful Music" was finally discontinued after marketing research indicated that a high percentage of the male audience wasn't entirely comfortable with the term. Around 1985, the playlist underwent a major update. Most of the instrumental cover versions of Top 40 vocal hits which had always been a key component of the format were abruptly deleted and substituted with "original songs by the original artists". The revamp led to the establishment of a more mainstream soft gold type of sound. However, despite this successful transformation and solid ratings, another much more dramatic change took place early in the following year when the station went adult contemporary. Ratings plummeted as rival station 3MP decided to pick up the Easy Listening concept and the relevant audience simply switched from 3AK to 3MP.

In 1986, after just one disastrous ratings period, 3AK and Sydney's 2UE embarked on a shared talk-back format, called the CBC Network, which featured selected Melbourne and Sydney-based programs being broadcast across both stations. 3AK's weekday breakfast shift with John Blackman remained a Melbourne only concern. Other programs being produced at the station were presented by well-known local personalities such as Ernie Sigley, Wendy Harmer, Jane Clifton, Fabian Datner, David Lentin and Adam Joseph. The experiment was yet another short-lived failure.

CBC was not a success, in part because many considered the format to be Sydney-centric. In 1987, Kerry Packer sold all of ACP's radio and television interests to Alan Bond for A$1 billion. 3AK was included in the deal, even though Bond made no secret of the fact that he wanted the TV stations but was not interested in radio. Because of Bond's insecure financial position, in 1990 Packer was able to buy back the Nine Network for a fraction of what he had sold it for. By this time, Bond had already sold 3AK.

=== Talk 3AK 1989-90 years ===
From mid 1989 to 1990, 3AK again become a purely talk format station with such high-profile names as Darren James (with Bruce Mansfield as "Uncle Roy"), Margaret Peacock, Don Chipp, Peter O'Callaghan (a former 3XY and EON FM DJ), Keith McGowan and Bill Howie (a former 3AK program director).

This period also saw the introduction of regular Saturday broadcasts of VFL (now AFL) with a football team headed by Graham Dawson.

In 1989 the federal government invited bids from all capital city AM commercial radio stations for a number of FM licences. Six of the seven Melbourne commercial AM stations bid for the two licences being offered in their market. (3AW was the only station that didn't bid, on the grounds that its mature adult audience were not really FM listeners.) The two highest bidders were 3KZ with a record bid amongst all Australia-wide bidders of A$32 million, and 3AK with a bid of $22 million. Because of the dire financial position of Alan Bond (he was soon to be declared bankrupt), 3AK defaulted on the payment for its FM licence, which then went to the third highest Melbourne bidder, 3TT who paid only $11 million.

=== 1990s ===
In 1990 the station was sold to Italian businessman Peter Corso who sacked most of its workforce in preparation to relaunch 3AK as Australia's first commercial Italian-language radio station. There was a brief transition period whilst Corso was preparing his Italian format during which Beautiful Music was played continuously without any advertisements, studio announcements, news broadcasts, etc., but interspersed with recorded announcements about the starting dates for the Italian broadcasts. Nevertheless, the station was not able to get out of its obligations to broadcast the football and, so, at 12 noon on Saturdays football was still broadcast, both during this transition period and for the rest of the season.

Only two former 3AK employees, technician Ralph Knight and producer Warren Koglin were to be rehired by the new owner. 3AK continued to broadcast from within the GTV9 complex for about 12 months, before moving to new studios at West Melbourne.

At one stage, Corso contemplated moving away from the unsuccessful Italian format and was in talks with Bert Newton and his partner to sub-lease the station and provide an old-fashioned personality format. The Australian Broadcasting Tribunal knocked back the application, firstly on the grounds that it could not allow the leasing of stations, and secondly because of questions raised as to the suitability of Newton's partner. The former reason is interesting in the light of 3AK/SEN's present situation.

The Italian format continued until 1994 when Corso sold the station to Southern Cross Broadcasting who took the station back to easy-listening music.

Corso was keen to sell 3AK because he had just obtained one of the first of the new narrowcast licences then being offered by the Australian Broadcasting Tribunal. Therefore, 3AK's Italian programming was transferred to the new narrow-cast station, 3BM, which transmitted from 1116 KC (ironically a wavelength that was later to be used by 3AK itself).

By 1996, Southern Cross had found itself owning four radio stations in Melbourne; 3AW, 3AK, 3EE, 3MP; whereas the legal limit was two stations in a single market. 3AK was sold to a Christian organisation, Fusion Media, who switched the format to a mixture of talk-back and magazine programs and easy listening music. The station was moved to studios on St Kilda Road that had originally been built for 3EE. It later moved again to Swan Street, Richmond.

=== Final years ===
After more years of low ratings and financial troubles, 3AK was sold again, to a small media and data company Data and Commerce Limited (DCL). In 2001, DCL transferred 3AK from 1503 kHz to 1116 kHz and relaunched 3AK once again as a talk back station in direct competition to top rating stations 3AW and ABC Radio Melbourne.

Controversial radio broadcaster Derryn Hinch took over 3AK's morning time-slot after twelve months as evening presenter at 3AW. A former Premier of Victoria, Jeff Kennett, was also a presenter.

=== Demise ===
Some unusual programming decisions and lack of promotion led to 3AK failing to lift from the bottom of the ratings ladder. In late 2003, DCL announced it had leased the running of radio 3AK to a new organisation Sports Entertainment Network (SEN) which converted 3AK to a 24-hour sport radio station. In January 2004, 3AK became known on-air as SEN 1116.

== SEN ==
While initially, ratings were steadily rising, the station's financial position took a turn for the worse in early 2005, with several employees, including Dermott Brereton, Mark Doran and Robert Shaw not being paid. This eventually led to Brereton walking out on the station. This financial situation could not have come at a worse time, since SEN had recently begun broadcasting into Adelaide. Adelaide broadcasts were short-lived because of the poor financial situation and the station's heavy Melbourne focus.

In 2006 it was announced that SEN had acquired rights to broadcast five Australian Football League matches per weekend.
