= Charlie Vaude =

Australian stage comedian

Charlie Vaude real name Charles Joseph Ridgway (1882 or 1884 – 29 October 1942), was a popular Australian stage comedian of the duo Vaude and Verne, then became a successful radio personality in Victoria.

== History ==
Ridgway was born in Horselydown, Bermondsey, near the Tower Bridge, London, a son of Charles John Ridgway and Mary Ridgway, née McCarthy. He was entranced by vaudeville, and amused his friends with imitations of music-hall stars. He had a few uncles in the entertainment industry, but his parents were not keen, so on leaving school he was made to work as an errand boy until he became a carpenter's apprentice. He quit to become a bandsman in Her Majesty's Royal West Surrey Regimental Band, but lost that when they found he was under age.

At age 19 he left, with his mother and brother Albert, for Western Australia, where he took a variety of jobs, including auctioneering, and became a friend of "Dryblower" Murphy, who encouraged his thespian proclivities. He joined with George Sorlie in a pierrot show, which failed to attract. He toured Western Australia and South Australia as a political comedian, creating topical jokes for each location and audience, reading all the local papers to keep abreast of the latest topics. He was an excellent singer and songwriter, so much of his act was topical songs to tunes of his own composition.

=== Vaude and Verne ===
Ridgway met William James Newins Bartington (born 1884 in Port Pirie, died 1943) in May 1907, when the two had separate acts for Bert Warne at Los Hayward's Empire Theatre, Broken Hill. Warne claims to have brought them together and given them their new names. They immediately "hit it off" as a team, with Vaude as the fast talking joker, and Verne as his incredulous "feed", punctuating his partner's rants with "Oh, yes." "Is that so?" or "Well?" For the first half of 1908 they toured New Zealand for Ben Fuller as "end men": as a comic foil to the compere, helping introduce each act and getting the audience laughing, then not to leave the stage but lead the applause at the end of each "turn". Then they were signed by Harry Rickards, and the patter act of Vaude and Verne was a popular turn on the Tivoli circuit for many years, through successive owners Hugh D. McIntosh and George Musgrove.

From 1926, together with Bert Dudley, they toured Queensland with Minna's Merrymakers. Minna's Theatres failed in 1928, but Vaude kept the company together, and as "Vaude and Verne's Merry-makers" they toured 1928 to 1930, when they dissolved the partnership.

=== 3DB ===
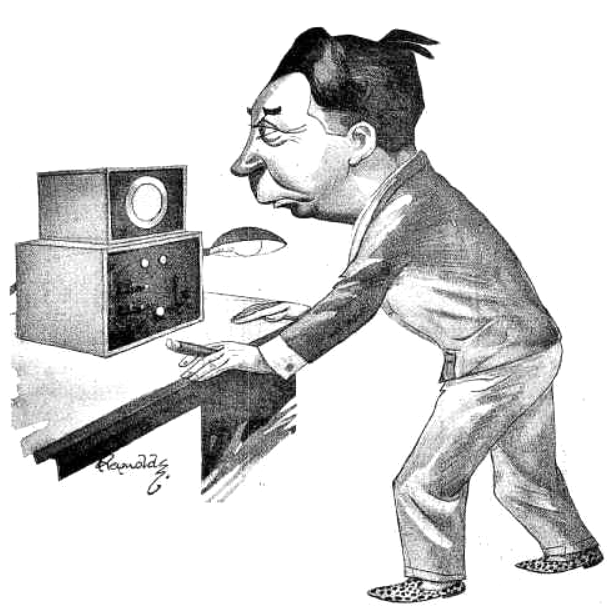
Vaude at 3DB, by L. F. Reynolds

In 1930 Vaude was contracted by Archie Whyte of The Sun to make their radio station 3DB's advertising more appealing. He became part of the station's on-air team.

When Australia played England in Test cricket at the MCC, Vaude added his own commentary to the ball-by-ball descriptions by Jack Ryder and Frank Russell, who were following the action through coded cable messages.

He was associated with Ryder and Bill Woodfull in later Test cricket broadcasts.

From 1932 Vaude and Renn Millar (died 1945) conducted community singing at the Princess Theatre, assisted by the C & G Minstrels, (Note: Named for and sponsored by Cole & Garrard, opticians, of 370 Bourke Street, Melbourne, the minstrels celebrated their 20th anniversary in 1949 and were still broadcasting in 1955.) and in various formats conducted a weekly show from 1932 to 1941.

He was host of the 3DB Smile Away Club.

While working at 3DB he was prominent in fund-raising for charities, being credited with collecting more than £60,000.

He died at home, following a serious operation. His remains were interred at the Melbourne General Cemetery.

== Recognition ==
Woodfull and Ryder helped organise the Charlie Vaude Hospital Cot Fund in his memory.

== Publications ==
- Charlie Vaude (1933). A Chuckle with Charlie Vaude – jokes from 25 years of stage comedy. Lothian Publishing Co., Melbourne.

Songs

- "Kosciuszko", sung by Nella Webb
- "Sing Us a Song of Australia", written 1917 for the First AIF troops, and sung by Violet Trevenyon
- "How Do You Do" (Note: "How Do You Do" was a (possibly unpublished) vaudeville patter song by Vaude in the style of "Mister Gallagher and Mister Shean", in which three rhyming lines were delivered impromptu.)

Gramophone recording

- "Ten, Twenty, Thirty, Forty, Fifty Years Ago" (Note: A "comedy foxtrot" written by Vaude and Jack O'Hagan but the line came from the song "My Old Shako" by Francis Barron and Henry Trotère.) sung by Charlie Vaude

B/W "Smile Away" sung by Charlie Vaude and Renn Miller [sic], on Vocalion disc.

== Family ==
On 25 September 1911, Ridgway married variety performer Lilias May "Lulla" Roots professionally known as Lilas Birt. They had one son:

- Charles Albert Joseph Vaude-Ridgway (8 December 1915 – ) married Edna Mary

He married again, to dancer Leila Halliday Sach on 5 October 1935.

They had a home "Cherwell", Clarke Street, Northcote, Melbourne

== Sources ==
- Charlie Vaude; J. M. Rohan (10 June 1939). "A Born Humorist". Sporting Globe. No. 1769. Victoria, Australia. p. 8 – via National Library of Australia.
- Charlie Vaude; J. M. Rohan (17 June 1939). "Charlie Vaude Recalls Some Experiences While Travelling the Road to the Tivoli". Sporting Globe. No. 1771. Victoria, Australia. p. 8 – via National Library of Australia.
- Charlie Vaude; J. M. Rohan (24 June 1939). "Charlie Vaude Invites You to Meet the Guv'nor". Sporting Globe. No. 1773. Victoria, Australia. p. 8 – via National Library of Australia.
