= Ernie McCormick =

Australian cricketer

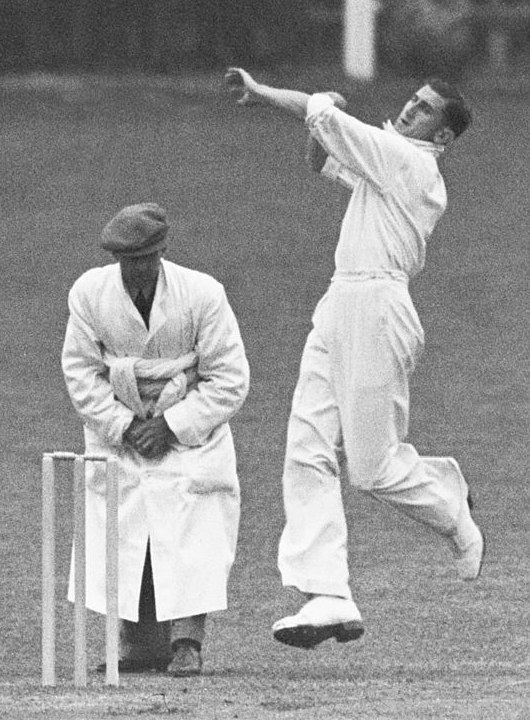
- McCormick in 1938

Personal information
- Born: 16 May 1906; North Carlton, Victoria, Australia
- Died: 28 June 1991 (aged 85); Tweed Heads, New South Wales, Australia
- Height: 188 cm (6 ft 2 in)
- Batting: Left-handed
- Bowling: Right-arm fast
- Role: Bowler

International information
- National side: Australia
- Test debut (cap 154): 14 December 1935 v South Africa
- Last Test: 22 July 1938 v England

Career statistics
Competition	Test	First-class
Matches	12	85
Runs scored	54	582
Batting average	6.00	8.68
100s/50s	0/0	0/1
Top score	17*	77*
Balls bowled	2,107	14,316
Wickets	36	241
Bowling average	29.97	27.74
5 wickets in innings	0	6
10 wickets in match	0	1
Best bowling	4/101	9/40
Catches/stumpings	8/–	46/–
- Source: Cricinfo, 10 September 2022

Ernest Leslie McCormick (16 May 1906 – 28 June 1991) was an Australian cricketer who played in 12 Test matches from 1935 to 1938.

McCormick was an instrument-maker and jeweler. After the 1960–61 West Indies tour of Australia, Donald Bradman and the Australian Cricket Board of Control commissioned McCormick to create a perpetual trophy for winners of Test match series between the two teams. Its design incorporated a ball used in the tied Test and the Frank Worrell Trophy was named in honour of the West Indies captain.

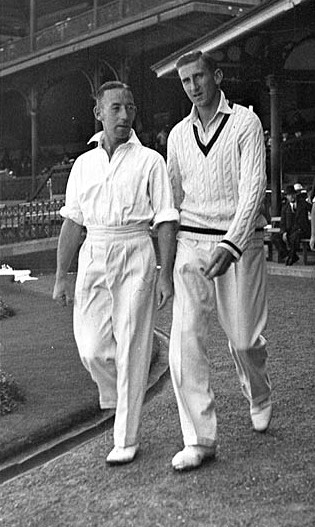
McCormick (r) at the SCG with teammate Lindsay Hassett in the late 1930s
