= George Andrew (Scottish footballer) =

Scottish footballer

Personal information
- Full name: George Andrew
- Date of birth: 24 November 1945
- Place of birth: Glasgow, Scotland
- Date of death: 30 July 1993 (aged 47)
- Place of death: Edinburgh, Scotland
- Position: Centre-back

Youth career
- Possilpark Juniors

Senior career*
| Years | Team | Apps | (Gls) |
| 1963–1967 | West Ham United | 2 | (0) |
| 1967–1968 | Crystal Palace | 0 | (0) |
| 1968–1970 | Romford | | |
- * Club domestic league appearances and goals

George Andrew (24 November 1945 – 30 July 1993) was a Scottish footballer who played as a centre-back.

== Career ==
Andrew began his career in the youth ranks at Scottish club Possilpark Juniors, before joining West Ham United in August 1963. Andrew had to wait nearly four years for his first team debut, deputising in a defence without West Ham stalwarts Bobby Moore and Ken Brown, in a 2–2 draw against Sunderland on 11 February 1967. Andrew made one final appearance for the club, a fortnight later in a 4–0 loss away to Everton. In July 1967, Andrew signed for Crystal Palace. Andrew stayed at the club for a year, failing to make a first team appearance. In 1968, Andrew dropped down into Non-League football, playing for Romford. Following his retirement, Andrew went into teaching and osteopathy.
