= Eric Welch's Sports Album =

- Genre: Sports
- Presented by: Eric Welch
- Country of origin: Australia
- Original language: English

Original release
- Network: GTV-9
- Release: 24 January – 1 August 1957

Eric Welch's Sports Album is an Australian television series which aired from 24 January to 1 August 1957. The series aired at 8:30PM on Thursdays on Melbourne station GTV-9, and featured a mix of live and filmed material.

Eric Welch was a sports commentator (particularly commenting on horse racing and boxing) and announcer on radio from the 1920s to 1970s, working at 3LO, 3DB and 3AK. He was well-known for his annual commentary of the Anzac Day march in Melbourne. On 3DB he was a panelist on the Australian version of the program Information Please. He was part of GTV-9's 1956 Olympics coverage team.

Sports Album utilized the Movietone library of vintage newsreel footage of Australian sporting events such as the Melbourne Cup, combined with live interviews of Australian sports figures.

The series was both an early example of sports-related programming on Australian television, as well as one of GTV's earliest locally produced series.

== See also ==
- List of Australian television series
