= Major Broadcasting Network =

Former broadcaster in Australia

The Major Broadcasting Network was an important part of the Australian broadcasting scene from 1938 until the 1970s.

== History and background ==
In 1938, David Worrall, manager of 3DB Melbourne, launched the Major Broadcasting Network. Up until its closure in the 1970s, MBS was Australia's second most important radio network, after the Macquarie Radio Network. At inception, the Major Network was made up of stations in all mainland state capital cities, i.e. 2UE, 3DB, 4BK, 5AD, 6PR. They were soon to be joined by 7HT.

The Sydney outlet was later changed to 2CH and then 2UW before 2UE yet again became the Sydney outlet in September 1950. In 1973, an important date because it was the 50th anniversary of broadcasting in Australia, the network then consisted of the following stations: 2UE, 2KO, 3DB, 3LK, 4BK, 4AK, 5AD, 5PI, 5MU, 5SE, 6PR, 6CI, 6TZ, 7HT and 7EX.

From formation and until the introduction of television in Australia, Major stations broadcast a popular range of live variety programs particularly quizzes and dramas including soap operas, mainly produced in studios at either 3DB Melbourne or the various Sydney outlets. Because of the high quality of these programs, most Major stations continually had high ratings in the various surveys.

As discussed, the main person behind the formation of the Major Network was David Worrall, manager of 3DB, a most important figure in broadcasting history. The establishment of the Major Network actually occurred after two earlier attempts by David Worrall to form a network both with 3DB as the key station and with 2UE as the Sydney station. Early in 1933, a loose grouping, but the first Australian attempt to form a commercial network, was attempted - it was known as the Federal Network. Then, later in 1933 the Associated Broadcasters of Australia was formed but, again, did not last long.

From 1941 and well into the 1950s, the main producer of live radio programs in Australia was the Colgate-Palmolive Radio Unit which achieved its prestigious status by luring big name stars away from the various stations and the main radio networks. Initially, the many dozens of programs produced by Colgate-Palmolive were heard on the Macquarie Radio Network but, after some years, David Worrall was able to lure Colgate-Palmolive over to the Major Network. Of course, this saw a great increase in listener numbers for the network.

== See also ==
- 3DB
- 2UE
- Macquarie Radio Network
