= List of people in communications and media in Australia =

This list records notable individuals who have participated in the industry.

== Wireless experimenters ==
- Edward Gustavus Campbell Barton
- Frank Prosser Bowden
- William Henry Bragg
- William Rooke Creswell
- Henry Walter Jenvey
- John P. King
- Edward Hope Kirkby
- Oswald Francis (Os) Mingay
- John Yeates Nelson
- Joseph Patrick Slattery
- Frederick Soddy
- George Phillip Stevens
- Henry Sutton
- George Augustine Taylor
- Richard Threlfall
- Charles Todd
- Philip Billingsley Walker

== Broadcasting pioneers ==
- Alfred Bennett, pioneer commercial radio manager
- Hugh Denison, radio pioneer and manager
- Ernest Fisk, radio pioneer and founder of AWA
- Bernard Heinze, musician and pioneer advisor to the ABC
- William James, musician and pioneer ABC broadcaster and manager
- Oliver Nilsen, radio pioneer
- Mel Morris, pioneer football commentator
- Charles Moses, pioneer sports broadcaster, and later ABC Manager
- Jack O'Hagan, composer and pioneer ABC and commercial broadcaster
- Frank Thring Sr, pioneer film director and radio manager
- Emil Voigt, pioneer of commercial radio

== Management ==
- Alan Bond, proprietor of television and radio interests
- Richard Boyer, administrator of ABC
- Talbot Duckmanton, ABC manager
- Ted Harris, director and manager
- David Hill, ABC Chair
- Donald McDonald, ABC manager
- Frank Packer, proprietor of television and radio interests
- Kerry Packer, proprietor of television and radio interests
- Eric Pearce, commercial broadcaster and station manager
- Mark Scott, ABC manager
- John Singleton, proprietor of radio interests
- Ron E Sparks, commercial radio manager
- James Spigelman, ABC Chair

== Producers, back-room personnel, etc. ==
- Dorothy Crawford, drama producer
- Hector Crawford, drama producer
- George Edwards, radio actor and producer
- Grace Gibson, drama producer
- Gwen Meredith, writer of radio plays
- Rex Rienits. writer of radio plays
- John Saul, radio actor and director
- Edward (E. V.) Timms, writer of radio plays

== Announcers, DJs, etc. ==
- Phillip Adams, ABC and commercial broadcaster
- Waleed Aly, ABC broadcaster
- Ward "Pally" Austin, commercial broadcaster
- Jim Ball, commercial broadcaster
- Norman Banks, commercial broadcaster
- Ray Barrett, commercial radio broadcaster, and later television and stage actor
- John Blackman, commercial broadcaster
- Stuart Bocking, commercial broadcaster
- Bruno Bouchet, commercial broadcaster
- Philip Brady, commercial broadcaster
- John Burns, commercial broadcaster
- Leon Byner, commercial broadcaster
- Brian Carlton, commercial broadcaster
- Mike Carlton, ABC & commercial broadcaster
- Ron Casey, commercial broadcaster
- Gordon Chater, commercial broadcaster and radio actor
- Don Chipp, politician and commercial broadcaster
- Jack Davey, commercial broadcaster
- Vic Davies, commercial broadcaster
- Smoky Dawson, singer and commercial radio presenter
- John Dease, commercial broadcaster
- James Dibble, ABC broadcaster
- George Donikian, commercial broadcaster
- Geraldine Doogue, ABC broadcaster
- Bob Dyer, commercial broadscaster
- Dolly Dyer, commercial broadcaster
- Gregg Easton, commercial broadcaster
- Malcolm T. Elliott, commercial broadcaster
- Dick Fair, commercial broadcaster
- Noel Ferrier, comedian and commercial broadcaster
- Greg Fleet, commercial broadcaster
- Graeme Gilbert, commercial broadcaster
- Grant Goldman, commercial broadcaster
- Andy Grace, commercial broadcaster
- Ugly Dave Gray, comedian and commercial broadcaster
- Ray Hadley, commercial broadcaster
- Happy Hammond, commercial broadcaster
- Peter Hand, commercial broadcaster
- Tommy Hanlon Jr., commercial broadcaster
- Mary Hardy, comedian and commercial broadcaster
- Wendy Harmer, ABC & commercial broadcaster
- Derryn Hinch, commercial broadcaster
- Peter Hitchener, commercial broadcaster
- Dave Hughes, commercial broadcaster
- Darren James, commercial broadcaster
- Alan Jones, commercial broadcaster
- Barry Jones, commercial broadcaster
- Brendan Jones, commercial broadcaster
- Amanda Keller, commercial broadcaster
- Fran Kelly, ABC broadcaster
- Graham Kennedy, ABC and commercial broadcaster
- Jeff Kennett, politician and commercial broadcaster
- Sonia Kruger, commercial broadcaster
- Alwyn Kurts, commercial broadcaster
- Don Lane, television compere and commercial broadcaster
- Kate Langbroek, commercial broadscaster
- John Laws, commercial broadcaster
- Tony Leonard, commercial broadcaster
- Jack Lumsdaine, singer, songwriter and commercial broadcaster
- Keith McGowan, commercial broadcaster
- Todd McKenney, commercial broadcaster
- Bruce Mansfield, commercial broadcaster
- Richard Mercer, commercial broadcaster
- Neil Mitchell, commercial broadcaster
- Tony Moclair, commercial broadcaster
- Jason Morrison, commercial broadcaster
- Doug Mulray, commercial broadcaster
- Jackie O (Jackie Henderson), commercial broadcaster
- Gwen Plumb, commercial broadcaster and radio actor
- Steve Price, commercial broadcaster
- Roy Rene "Mo", comedian and commercial broadcaster
- Kel Richards, commercial broadcaster
- Glenn Ridge, commercial broadcaster
- Andrew Rochford, commercial broadcaster
- Stan Rofe, commercial broadcaster
- Bob Rogers, commercial broadcaster
- Kyle Sandilands, commercial broadcaster
- Ernie Sigley, commercial broadcaster
- Trevor Sinclair, commercial broadcaster
- Justin Smith, commercial broadcaster
- Keith Smith, ABC and commercial broadcaster
- Peter Smith, ABC and commercial broadcaster
- Ron E Sparks, commercial broadcaster
- John Stanley, commercial broadcaster
- Ross Stevenson, commercial broadcaster
- Chrissie Swan, commercial broadcaster
- Wilfrid Thomas, ABC broadcaster
- Ian Turpie commercial broadcaster, but mainly known for his TV work
- Denis Walter, commercial broadcaster
- Tim Webster, commercial broadcaster
- Stan Zemanek, commercial broadcaster

== Specialist broadcasters ==
- Eric Baume, journalist, commentator and commercial broadcaster
- Dick Bentley, ABC comedian
- John Bluthal, radio actor
- John Cargher, ABC and commercial presenter of classical music programs
- John Cazabon, radio actor
- Guy Doleman, radio actor
- John Ewart, radio actor and "Jimmy" of ABC Children's Session
- Jane Fennell, ABC children's presenter
- Willie Fennell, commercial radio comedian and actor
- Peter Finch, radio actor who later became a prominent Hollywood star
- Atholl Fleming, "Mac" of ABC Children's Session
- Andrew Ford, music journalist and presenter
- Stewart Ginn, radio actor
- Neva Carr Glyn, radio actor
- Reg Goldsworthy, radio actor
- Reg Grundy, radio actor and sportcaster who later became a television mogul
- Earle Hackett, ABC medical presenter
- Ron Haddrick, radio actor
- Patricia Kennedy, radio actor
- Bill Kerr, radio actor
- Dawn Lake, radio variety artist
- Bobby Limb, radio variety artist
- Doug McKenzie, commercial radio comedian
- Fr Bob Maguire, commercial religious broadcaster
- John Meillon, radio actor
- Crosbie Morrison, naturalist and broadcaster
- Ida Elizabeth Osbourne, ABC children's Session, later women's programs
- Jack Perry, commercial radio comedian
- Redmond Phillips, radio actor and writer
- Walter Pym, radio actor
- James Raglan, radio actor
- Ron Randell, radio actor who later became a prominent Hollywood star
- Deaconess Margaret Rodgers, religious broadcaster
- June Salter, radio actor
- Dinah Shearing, radio actor
- Muriel Steinbeck, radio actor
- Dr Norman Swan, ABC broadcaster
- Charles (Bud) Tingwell, radio actor
- Lou Vernon, radio actor
- George Wallace, commercial comedian
- Myf Warhurst, ABC popular music journalist and presenter
- John West, "The Showman", ABC theatre reviewer
- Robyn Williams, ABC science presenter

== Sportscasters ==
- Mickey Arthur, cricket commentator
- Luke Ball, football commentator
- Harry Beitzel, football commentator
- Andrew Bews, football commentator
- Greg Blewett, cricket commentator
- Henry Blofeld, cricket commentator
- Graeme Bond, football commentator
- Allan Border, cricket commentator
- Dermott Brereton, footballer and commercial broadcaster
- Jonathan Brown, football commentator
- Nathan Brown, football commentator
- Bert Bryant, racecaller
- Wayne Carey, football commentator
- Ron Casey, commercial broadcaster and football commentator
- Ian Chappell, football commentator
- Tony Charlton, football commentator and commercial broadcaster
- Stuart Clark, cricket commentator
- Michael Christian, sportscaster
- Bill Collins racecaller and commercial broadcaster
- Dennis Cometti, football commentator
- Rohan Connolly, football commentator
- Scott Cummings, football commentator
- Jack Dyer, football commentator
- John Emburey, cricket commentator
- Denis Fitzgerald, football commentator
- Damien Fleming, cricket commentator
- John (Gibbsy) Gibbs, commercial broadcaster
- Gerard Healy, commercial sportscaster
- Des Hoysted, racecaller
- Rex Hunt, football commentator and commercial broadcaster, especially fishing programs
- Craig Hutchison, football commentator
- Chris Johnson, football commentator
- Dean Jones, cricket commentator
- David King, football commentator
- Tim Lane, football commentator
- Dr Peter Larkins, football commentator
- Darren Lehmann, cricket commentator
- Cameron Ling, football commentator
- Matthew Lloyd, football commentator
- Garry Lyon, football commentator
- Glenn McGrath, cricket commentator
- Ian Major, commercial broadcaster and football commentator
- Mick Malthouse, football commentator
- Greg Matthews, cricket commentator
- Leigh Matthews, football commentator
- Jack Mueller, football commentator
- Sam Newman, football commentator
- Angela Pippos, sportscaster
- Stephen Quartermain, football commentator
- Lou Richards, football commentator and commercial broadcaster
- Matthew Richardson, football commentator
- Dwayne Russell, commercial sportscaster
- Robert Shaw, footballer and broadcaster
- Tony Shaw, football commentator
- Mike Sheahan, football commentator
- Peter Sterling, football commentator
- John Tapp, racecaller
- Brian Taylor, football commentator and commercial broadcaster
- Mark Thompson, football commentator
- Michael Vaughan, cricket commentator
- Robert Walls, football commentator
- Tim Webster, commercial sportscaster
- Eric Welch, ABC and commercial broadcaster and sportscaster
- Mike Williamson, commercial broadcaster and sportscaster
- Caroline Wilson, football commentator

== Newspaper owners / managers ==
- John Fairfax, purchased the Sydney Herald in 1841, which became the Sydney Morning Herald
- Greg Hywood, former CEO of Fairfax Media
- William McGarvie, one of the three founders of the Sydney Morning Herald

== Journalists ==
- Waleed Aly
- Julia Baird
- Lucian Boz
- Mike Carlton
- Anne Davies
- Elizabeth Farrelly
- Peter FitzSimons
- Ross Gittins
- Richard Glover
- Peter Hartcher
- Amanda Hooton
- Adele Horin
- H. G. Kippax
- Roy Masters
- Anne Summers
- Kate McClymont
