= John Coleman on Football =

- Genre: Sports
- Presented by: John Coleman
- Country of origin: Australia
- Original language: English

Production
- Running time: 15 minutes

Original release
- Network: HSV-7
- Release: 1957 – 1957

John Coleman on Football is an Australian television series which aired in 1957 on Melbourne station HSV-7. It featured former footballer John Coleman. It aired in a 15-minute time-slot on Thursdays (originally at 9:30PM to 9:45PM). In an episode telecast on 18 April 1957, the series aired at 9:30PM, preceded by Hit Parade and followed by news and weather. The episode aired on 19 September 1957 aired at 10:40PM, preceded by The Late Show and followed by news and weather.

== See also ==
- The Footy Show
- Football Survey
- Football Inquest
