= Jack Elliott (racing journalist) =

Australian journalist

Jack Elliott OAM
- Born: John Denis Elliott; 15 April 1922; Essendon, Victoria, Australia
- Died: 4 November 2007 (aged 85)
- Occupations: Horse racing presenter & journalist

John Denis Elliott OAM (15 April 1922 – 4 November 2007), known for most of his life as Jack, was an Australian horse racing journalist and commentator.

== Early life ==
Elliott was born in Essendon, a suburb of Melbourne, in 1922, during a period in Australia's history represented by particularly hard economic times. His parents, John William Elliott and Mary Ann Elliott were living in a shared house in Essendon in 1919 but with the imminent arrival of a new baby moved to a small cottage of their own.

In 1935 he enrolled at St. Joseph's College, North Melbourne and gained his Intermediate Certificate there two years later.

During World War Two, Elliott served as a Warrant officer in the 2nd Australian Infantry Battalion. He was demobilised in May 1946 after completing his duty with the 2/33rd Battalion (Australia).

== Career ==
Elliott began his main working career as a copy boy with The Truth (Melbourne newspaper). Following his period of war service he became a sports writer with The Argus (Melbourne) in 1946 before moving on to The Sporting Globe in 1954. While at the Globe, Elliott filled the role of Chief Racing Writer and was a well known identity both on and off the track. In 1957 he moved to The Herald (Melbourne) as Turf editor, a post he held for 30 years.

His other commitments included acting as a Presenter on Channel 7's World of Sport (Australian TV series), where he became good friends with Ron Casey, Bill Collins and Lou Richards. He also spent some time as a radio Presenter with various radio stations including 3DB in Melbourne.

Elliott retired from his career in 1987 after covering numerous Melbourne Cups beginning in the 1940s.

== Later life ==
Elliott maintained close links with those in the horse racing field including Tommy J. Smith. He lived with his wife Joan in the Essendon area until the mid 1970s when he moved to South Yarra. Awarded a Medal of the Order of Australia (OAM) for services to the sport of horse racing Elliott died in 2007 after battling ill health for some time.
