= World of Sport (Australian TV program) =

Television series

- Genre: Talk show; Sports
- Directed by: Dick Jones; Michael Barnett
- Presented by: Ron Casey; "Uncle Doug" Elliott; Sandy Roberts; Bill Collins
- Country of origin: Australia
- Original language: English
- No. of seasons: 29

Production
- Producer: Gordon Bennett
- Production location: HSV-7
- Running time: 240 minutes

Original release
- Network: Seven Network
- Release: 16 May 1959 – 22 March 1987

World of Sport was an Australian sports program that was broadcast live by HSV-7 in Melbourne from 1959 to 1987 on Sundays between 11am and 2pm. By the end of its run, the show was claimed as the world's longest running sports program.

== History ==
A combination of commentary about sports, the program held a place in the sports-obsessed culture of Melbourne and made stars out of a number of ex-sportsman, particularly Australian rules footballers.

The show premiered on Saturday 16 May 1959, less than three years after the debut of television in Australia.

Initially sponsored by Westinghouse, it ran for two hours and was hosted by radio commentator Ron Casey. The sponsor turned down an opportunity to renew after a thirteen-week run, but Casey saw the opportunity inherent in the concept and enlisted the help of another well-known radio presenter, "Uncle Doug" Elliott.

The duo bought the concept, purchased air time on a Sunday and enlisted a new sponsor, Vealls, for 1960.

Appearing on the show with Casey were racing journalist Jack Elliott, professional foot runner Mike Williamson, publican and footballer Ted Rippon, boxing journalist Merv Williams, footballer and journalist Kevin Coghlan, broadcaster Doug Elliott, who was also a member of the Victorian Legislative Council from 1960 to 1979, Victorian policeman and champion axeman Jack O'Toole, Geelong footballing champion Bob Davis, triple Brownlow medallist Bob Skilton, Collingwood goal-kicking Legend Gordon Coventry, actor, boxer and international boxing referee Gus Mercurio (father of Paul Mercurio), singer and racecaller "The Accurate One" Bill Collins, racing journalist Rollo Roylance, Brownlow Medallist Neil Roberts, boxer and sports reporter and football commentator Peter Landy. One of the delights was seeing Bruce Andrew, "whose hair was parted so emphatically down the centre that it was claimed he used a theodolite", judging the short and long kicking contests.

Dyer in particular was known for some of his legendary one-liners, or "Dyerisms", such as:

- "He's tuckled strongly by Tack." (referring to Michael Tuck)
- "He sets himself for a high mark – actually, that was a low high mark"
- "Bamblett made a great debut last week, and an even better one today."

The show also featured woodchopping contests, a contest involving sand and blue-metal shovelling, sheaf tossing, track-cycle sprint-racing on rollers (with world champion cyclist Sid Patterson taking on all comers), and a game of indoor football invented specifically for that show in that particular studio space. The show was also famous for having champion VFL footballers of the day appearing on the show to contest the handball competition, and receive prizes such as meat pies and hairdryers.

A group involved in the Melbourne-based post-punk little band scene of the 1980s named themselves after the show.

== See also ==
- World of Sport (Sydney, Australia TV series)
