= What's the Meaning? =

- Genre: Game show
- Presented by: Larry K. Nixon
- Country of origin: Australia
- Original language: English

Production
- Running time: 30 minutes

Original release
- Network: HSV-7
- Release: 1962

What's the Meaning? is an Australian television series which aired 1962 on Melbourne station HSV-7. It was a game show featuring a champion and challengers as well as a "seven locks" competition, but little else is known about the series. It was hosted by Larry K. Nixon, who had previously hosted Lady for Day. During 1962 he also hosted Buy Word.

== Scheduling ==
It was a daytime series aired in a half-hour time-slot on Tuesdays at 2:30PM. A later episode, for example, aired against Western series Johnny Ringo on GTV-9 and BBC serial Nicholas Nickleby on ABV-2, while an earlier episode aired against U.S. series The Detectives on GTV-9 and For Schools on ABV-2.
