= Sports Parade (TV series) =

- Genre: Sports
- Presented by: Tony Charlton
- Country of origin: Australia
- Original language: English

Production
- Running time: 30 minutes

Original release
- Network: GTV-9
- Release: 7 June – 23 August 1957

Sports Parade is an Australian television series which aired in 1957. Broadcast on Melbourne station GTV-9, it ran weekly from 7 June 1957 to 23 August 1957. It was a simulcast of a 3KZ radio series. Hosted by Tony Charlton, each episode featured members of a different football club. It aired in a half-hour time-slot. It is not known if the series ever kinescoped.

Other early Australian television series to be based on radio shows included Raising a Husband, Leave it to the Girls, Oxford Show, Swallows Parade and The Pressure Pak Show.

== See also ==
- List of Australian television series
