= At Your Request =

- Genre: Music television
- Presented by: Charles Skase
- Country of origin: Australia
- Original language: English

Original release
- Network: HSV-7
- Release: 1958 – 1959

At Your Request is an Australian television daytime series which aired from 1958 to 1959. The series aired on Tuesdays at 2:30PM on Melbourne station HSV-7, and was hosted by baritone Charles Skase, who was also known as a radio personality. Information on this series is scarce. The series presented requested songs, but it is not clear how these songs were presented (such as whether it was a disc jockey series like TV Disc Jockey, a lip-sync series like Hit Parade, or a live music series like Sweet and Low). The archival status of the series is also not known, although being a daytime series aired in a single city means it is unlikely (though not impossible) that kinescope recordings exist of it.

For some time, the series was preceded on HSV-7's schedule by documentary series Australia Wide and followed by Gadget Man (which consisted of demonstrations of gadgets).

On Australian television of the 1950s, music programmes were typically aired in a single city, with some exceptions.
