= Road Safety (TV series) =

- Genre: Factual
- Presented by: Pat Ryan
- Country of origin: Australia
- Original language: English

Production
- Running time: 10 minutes

Original release
- Network: GTV-9
- Release: 1957 – 1957

Road Safety is a 1957 Australian television series aired on GTV-9 in Melbourne. Each episode aired in a 10-minute time-slot on Mondays. Like most early Australian series, it aired in a single city only.

In the series, constable Pat Ryan gave "points on road safety, courtesy and rules".

A TV schedule from March 1957 shows the series at 7:50PM, following a Roy Rogers film and followed by Jack Davey's game show Give it a Go, and aired against Disneyland on HSV-7 and the 1954 version of Sherlock Holmes on ABV-2. GTV-9's other locally produced programming on that day were The Happy Show (a children's series that later became The Tarax Show), news, and the popular Professor Browne's Study segment.

Though the series is extremely obscure, it represents an early experiment in programming by GTV-9, as the station tried to determine what kind of programming would appeal to viewers. Most 1957 Australian series were fairly short-lived, as stations tried out different formats to see which worked.

The series was later replaced on the schedule by another 10-minute segment, Football Survey.

Although the rather primitive kinescope recording technology existed, none of the episodes are known to survive.
