= Franquin (TV series) =

- Genre: Hypnotism
- Presented by: Franquin
- Country of origin: Australia
- Original language: English
- No. of episodes: 2 or 3

Original release
- Network: HSV-7
- Release: 1958 – 1958

Franquin is a set of two or three Australian TV specials that aired in 1958 on Melbourne television station HSV-7. Franquin was a hypnotist/entertainer (born Francis Patrick Joseph Quinn, 1914–2010).

Melbourne newspaper The Age called the series "most successful" and that HSV-7 "experienced the most favorable viewer-reaction to the series. The station was inundated with telephone calls and letters".

It is not known if kinescope recordings exist of either special. Kinescope recording was the method used to record live and as-live television in the days before video-tape, involving recording the television screen image onto 16mm film using special equipment. HSV-7 appears to have not had video-tape equipment until the early 1960s.
