= Sports Talk (Australian TV series) =

- Genre: Sports
- Presented by: Bill Collins; Harry Gordon; Lou Richards
- Country of origin: Australia
- Original language: English

Original release
- Network: HSV-7
- Release: 9 November 1956 – 1959

Sports Talk is an early Australian television series. Debuting on 9 November 1956, it aired on Melbourne station HSV-7 on a weekly basis until 1958, but was revived for a while in 1959 with a different format.

Hosted by Bill Collins and Harry Gordon, the first version of the series presented sports news and personalities. The 1959 version aired at 11:00PM, was hosted by Lou Richards and focused on football.

== See also ==
- List of Australian television series
