= Variety 7 =

- Genre: Variety
- Presented by: Ron Bond; Michael Cole; Bill Collins
- Country of origin: Australia
- Original language: English
- No. of seasons: 2

Production
- Running time: 55-60 minutes

Original release
- Network: HSV-7
- Release: 1 April 1963 – 1964

Variety 7 is an Australian television series which aired from 1963 to 1964 on Melbourne station HSV-7. Hosts during the run included Ron Bond (1963), Michael Cole (1963), and Bill Collins (1964). It was an hour-long variety series, but some episodes aired in a 55-minute time-slot. The series debuted 1 April 1963, and after taking a short break, the second season aired on January 20, 1964. George Wallace Jr. was a regular in the first season.
