= Time for Terry =

- Genre: Variety
- Presented by: Terry O'Neill
- Country of origin: Australia
- Original language: English

Original release
- Network: HSV-7
- Release: 1964 – 3 April 1969

Time for Terry was an Australian TV series which ran from 1964 until 3 April 1969. It was a variety show that was hosted by English comedian and entertainer as well as jazz musician Terry O'Neill. The show was a forerunner to such shows as The Midday Show and Hey Hey It's Saturday, combining variety and music with game show elements. The show was so successful for HSV-7 that it launched a season of Night-time for Terry in 1966.

O'Neill had run a similar successful show in England called The One O'Clock Show. Amongst other highlights, the show was responsible for launching the careers of Pat Carroll and Olivia Newton-John, whose farewell to Australian television before leaving for England was broadcast on the show. Terry's then wife Peggy Haig (sister of English comic actor Jack Haig) made frequent appearances as did their daughter Coral Kelly - later to become prolific television writer Coral Drouyn.

== Cast ==
- Vi Greenhalf
- Joe Hudson
- Ivan Hutchinson
- Brian Naylor
- Olivia Newton-John
- Ian Turpie
- Terry Norris
