= Mary Hardy (comedian) =

Australian television and radio presenter, actor and comedian

- Born: Mary Veronica Hardy; 14 October 1931; Warrnambool, Victoria, Australia
- Died: 4–7 January 1985 (aged 53)
- Occupations: Radio and television presenter; actress; writer; comedian
- Relatives: Frank Hardy (brother); Marieke Hardy (grandniece)

Mary Veronica Hardy (14 October 1931 – 4 to 7 January 1985) was an Australian television and radio presenter, actress, writer and comedian. She was best known for her caustic wit, indifference to authority and tireless ability to ad lib. On receiving one of her many Logie Awards, she quipped: “In all sincerity I don’t want to thank anybody”.

== Biography ==
Mary Hardy was born in Warrnambool and brought up in Bacchus Marsh. She was the youngest of eight children; her parents were Winifred Mary (née Bourke) and Thomas John Hardy. The author Frank Hardy was her brother; their father died in 1943. Her acting career began when she was noticed by representatives from the J. C. Williamson company, and she worked for several years in various Williamson productions beginning with Charley's Aunt in 1946. She joined the Ethna Players in 1950. However it was not until 1957 when she took the role of Peter in the J. C. Williamson production of Peter Pan that she became famous.

The following year, after Hardy's nomination for "Actress of the Year" for her role as Frankie in A Member of the Wedding, the recently formed Union Theatre Repertory Company offered her a permanent position joining actors such as Noel Ferrier, Frank Thring, Toni Lamond and Fred Parslow. She first appeared with UTRC as the cabin boy Pip in Moby Dick—Rehearsed.

In the early 1960s she began to write, and appear in, late night satirical revues. These began at the Arlen Theatre in St. Kilda with, amongst others, Noel Tovey. Later she would perform at the Phillip Theatre in Sydney with Jill Perryman, Gordon Chater and Judi Farr. The move from theatre to television would come via these revues.

In 1962 she married the musician Ian Pearce. They lived at a home he inherited from his mother in Shanahan Crescent, McKinnon. 1962 was also the year that she first presented a television show, the 26 July episode of Personally Yours. The 13-part series had a different presenter each week; it was 'designed so that the comperes' special talent will be reflected in each show'.

In 1964 Noel Ferrier asked Hardy if she would join him on television in In Melbourne Tonight (also known as IMT); Ferrier was one of three hosts of the show at this time and each IMT was different. As well as television she began co-hosting a morning radio program with Ferrier on 3UZ, which was to become Melbourne's most popular afternoon radio program for five years: Ferrier praised her 'fearless and unstoppable flow of talk on any subject, whether she knew anything about it or not'. In 1966 TV Week's Peter Nally reported that she had decided against signing with a Sydney-based show starring Barry Crocker, staying instead with IMT and her 'daily radio sessions': 'My first love is radio', she told Nally. In 1967 Hardy started a new television program, Noel and Mary with Ferrier on Channel 0. Initial reports suggested that a pilot of the show had been abandoned by the broadcaster because it was vulgar (or 'blue'), which Ferrier denied: 'We are about as dirty as Rebecca of Sunnybrook Farm', he told TV Week, explaining that the 'pilot' had not been intended for broadcast but as a demonstration of the show for potential sponsors.

Both of her notable television and radio shows allowed Hardy to ad-lib. She was very popular and won seven Logie awards for Best Female Personality. Proving to be too successful, especially at the expense of male comedians, Hardy was sacked from GTV-9. Television critic John Pinkney noted in 1970 that Hardy was 'the only performer who has even consistently out-jested Graham Kennedy... for her pains she was sacked from IMT.' She later said "Before I came on the scene, if you were a woman on television, you were barrel girl, a weather girl or a wheel spinner...".

In 1967 Hardy signed up with HSV-7 to co-host The Penthouse Club with Mike Williamson, where telecasts of harness racing, then known as "the trots", were interspersed with live variety. After Williamson left the show, Hardy's co-hosts included Ernie Sigley and Bill Collins. In 1968 she played the character of secretary Miss Dardanelles in the pilot for Once Upon a Twilight, a projected series starring The Twilights.

Hardy returned to the theatre and in 1969 was awarded the Rosa Ribush Award for "Best Supporting Actress" for her role as Agnes in Mame. She also played Phyllis McTaggart in the sitcom Good Morning Mr. Doubleday and Harriet Turner in the soap opera Bellbird.

She also worked at radio station 3AW beginning in October, 1972 and ending in May 1979 for unspecified reasons.

In his play Mary Lives, wherein, he said, 'the factual element... is stronger than most of my other works' Frank Hardy implies that Mary and her husband had extramarital affairs. In the early-to-mid-1970s Mary, according to Frank, spent six weeks of every year with the American comedian and TV actor Freddy Prinze: twenty years her junior and a fellow suicide. Mary Hardy and Ian Pearce divorced in 1975. The stress of her career in radio and television was considerable and in May 1977, Hardy collapsed on set. She was admitted to a private hospital for two weeks, and later gave several interviews about what the studio called a 'virus' which had officially struck her down. But she made no attempt to hide her perilous state saying "You're just hanging by a bit of a string and sometimes they let go of the string and you fall down".

Over the next two years, the 'rests' between shows, the live 'walkouts' on air and brief stays in hospital became more frequent and she left The Penthouse Club in late 1978. After winning her seventh and final Logie, knowing that her long-running command over variety television was coming to an end, she said "I really have to thank Graham Kennedy for this. If he hadn't got me the sack all those years ago, I would not have gone to Seven".

In 1980 she was sacked again, this time from the role of Joyce Pullen in Shut Your Eyes and Think of England, in which she was to play opposite Derek Nimmo. The decision was made to dismiss her two weeks before the play was due to open. Kenn Brodziak, at this time managing director of J. C. Williamson, quoted director Roger Redfarn as saying 'the one thing the character needed was innocence, and Mary doesn't have that.'

== Swearing on live television ==
In her memoir Bloodbath, Patricia Edgar writes 'In 1974, broadcaster Mary Hardy [was] suspended by the ABCB for accidentally using the word fuck on live television.' This happened twice, on Penthouse Club, on 10 August and 7 December of that year. On one occasion, she was pretending to buzz out swear words with a buzzer device, and on another, she was karate chopping bricks. Critics, such as the Melbourne Age's John Pinkney, condemned Channel 7 for allowing the ABCB to penalise Hardy. Frank Hardy claimed credit for contacting the Prime Minister, Gough Whitlam, and asking him to bring pressure to bear to have her suspension lifted.

In early 1975, she told Jim Murphy of Listener-In TV that 'I know that if my mother were alive she would have been very disappointed in me, and that alone makes me regret it deeply.’ However she explained her behaviour by adding:

You can't do a three-and-a-half-hour live, ad-lib television show like Penthouse with an empty head. Your mind is crammed with a jumble of thoughts, all ready to burst out when an opportunity presents itself... It's instant reaction all the way.

== Death ==
Ferrier writes in his 1985 memoir that Hardy 'began living in a world of almost total fantasy' and that she 'became desperately unhappy and engaged in excessive behaviour in what seemed to be a way to keep herself going.' Hardy suicided between 4 and 7 January 1985, and was buried in the Cheltenham Memorial Park. Ferrier mused later in the year that 'The real tragedy is that someone as talented as Hardy was allowed to destroy herself long before she actually died while we, her good friends, stood by and did nothing.'

== Family and tributes ==
Hardy's brother Frank wrote a play celebrating her life, Mary Lives!, which was staged at Melbourne's Malthouse Theatre in 1992. The play starred Mary-Anne Fahey as Mary.

In February 2008 ABC TV broadcast a 30-minute documentary on Hardy's life entitled IOU: Mary Hardy.

Her grandniece is Australian writer and media personality Marieke Hardy.
