= Stop the Music (Australian TV series) =

- Genre: Game show
- Presented by: John Eden
- Country of origin: Australia
- Original language: English

Original release
- Network: HSV-7
- Release: 7 November 1956 – 24 April 1957

Stop the Music is an early Australian television series, which aired from 1956 to 1957 on Melbourne station HSV-7. The station began broadcasting on 4 November 1956, and Stop the Music debuted a few days later on the 7th, along with Eric and Mary. A music-based game show, Stop the Music was hosted by John Eden and also featured audience participation. The last air-date for the show was 24 April 1957, and the program was replaced the following week by the talent program Stairway to the Stars. It is not known if HSV-7 had equipment to make kinescope recordings during the run of the series (which was broadcast live), and the archival status of the series is unknown, with the series possibly being lost (though this is not confirmed).
