= Fun with Charades =

- Genre: Game show
- Based on: Pantomime Quiz by Mike Stokey Productions
- Presented by: Miles Maxwell; Danny Webb
- Country of origin: Australia
- Original language: English

Original release
- Release: 1956 – 1958

Fun with Charades is an Australian television program which aired on Sundays from late 1956 to early 1958 on Melbourne station HSV-7. The show was originally hosted by Miles Maxwell, a music teacher at Brighton Grammar School. Later episodes were hosted by Danny Webb. The format was near-identical to the American series Pantomime Quiz, which itself saw an Australian version in 1957 on stations ATN-7 and GTV-9. It is not known if Fun with Charades was ever kinescoped.

== Gameplay ==
Two teams of four members compete. One member of the team is told the charade (which could be the title of a book, play, etc.) and without saying anything has to act it out, with his team needing to figure out the answer within 60 seconds.

== See also ==
The following game shows also debuted on station HSV-7 during late 1956:

- I've Got a Secret
- Stop the Music
- Wedding Day
