= Blues, Studio One =

- Genre: Music
- Starring: Joan Bilceaux
- Country of origin: Australia
- Original language: English
- No. of episodes: 5

Original release
- Network: HSV-7
- Release: 24 September 1957 – 1957

Blues, Studio One is an Australian television series which aired live on Melbourne station HSV-7 for five episodes in 1957. The first episode aired Tuesday, 24 September 1957 at 7:15PM, while the remaining episodes were aired on Wednesdays at 7:00PM. The series starred singer Joan Bilceaux and her Quintet.
