= Let's Dance (Australian TV series) =

- Genre: Instructional
- Presented by: Sue Campbell; Colin Campbell
- Country of origin: Australia
- Original language: English

Production
- Running time: 15 minutes

Original release
- Network: HSV-7
- Release: 25 March – 23 September 1957

Let's Dance is an early Australian television series. The fifteen-minute series ran weekly from 25 March to 23 September 1957, and aired on Melbourne station HSV-7.

The series featured Sue and Colin Campbell, who demonstrated dancing for the viewers. Sue Campbell would put decorations on her shoes to attract viewers attention to her feet.

It is not known if any of the episodes exist as kinescope recordings.
