= Cool Cats Show =

- Genre: Music television
- Presented by: Don Bennetts
- Country of origin: Australia
- Original language: English

Original release
- Network: HSV-7
- Release: 1958 – 1960

Cool Cats Show is an Australian television series that aired live on Melbourne station HSV-7 from 1958 to 1960. When it debuted Australian series often aired on a single station, but this was becoming less common during the run of the series, as more shows began being shown in several cities as television spread across the country. The series is notable as an early example of an Australian television series aimed at teenagers. TV listings of the era described it as a "teenage studio dance" hosted by Don Bennetts with guest artists. The Ted Vining Trio is listed as appearing in several episodes.

It is not known if kinescope recordings exist of the series.
