= Brenda's Time =

Television series

- Genre: Talk show
- Presented by: Brenda Marshall
- Country of origin: Australia
- Original language: English

Production
- Running time: 15 minutes

Original release
- Network: HSV-7
- Release: 1959 – 1959

Brenda's Time is an Australian television series which aired in 1959 on Melbourne station HSV-7. It featured Brenda Marshall, a HSV personality of the period. It aired in a 15-minute time-slot, and appears to have been an interview show. It aired on Wednesdays at 4:00PM, preceded by Menu for Tomorrow and followed at 4:15PM by imported drama Scarlet Pimpernel.
