= Pick a Pint =

- Genre: Children's television; Game show
- Presented by: Pat Hodgins
- Country of origin: Australia
- Original language: English

Production
- Running time: 15 minutes

Original release
- Network: HSV-7
- Release: February 1960 – May 1960

Pick a Pint was an Australian television series which aired in 1960 on Melbourne station HSV-7. It was a game show for children and was hosted by Pat Hodgins. A 15-minute series broadcast on Fridays, it proved short-lived, running from February to May. The archival status of the series is not known.

Hodgins had previously hosted Snakes and Ladders on the same station.
