= Auditions (TV series) =

- Genre: Talent show
- Presented by: Wally Peterson
- Country of origin: Australia
- Original language: English

Original release
- Network: HSV-7
- Release: 21 July 1962

Auditions is an Australian television series which aired in 1962, and for which little information is available. Hosted by Wally Peterson (sometimes listed as Wally Petersen), the series aired on Melbourne station HSV-7 for several months. It was described as a "local amateur talent programme". At the time, Australian television was not yet fully networked.
