= Hold Everything (TV series) =

Television series

- Genre: Variety
- Presented by: Peter Colville
- Country of origin: Australia
- Original language: English

Original release
- Network: HSV-7
- Release: 1961

Hold Everything is an Australian television series which aired in 1961 on Melbourne station HSV-7. A variety series, it was hosted by Peter Colville and aired at 9:30PM on Thursdays. It was facing tough competition from the popular In Melbourne Tonight on GTV-9. The series was produced at the Fitzroy Teletheatre.

After the series ended, some of the game show elements were retained in a new series titled Merry-Go-Round.
