= 1954 Melbourne Cup =

Edition of the Melbourne Cup

- Melbourne Cup
- Location: Flemington Racecourse
- Date: 2 Nov 1954
- Distance: 2 miles
- Winning horse: Rising Fast
- Winning time: 3:23.0
- Final odds: 5/2
- Jockey: Jack Purtell
- Trainer: I J Tucker
- Surface: Turf

Here's Rising Fast going after him at every stride, Pandie Star behind them and then coming home well Commodore. Rising Fast has hit the front from Gay Helios at the furlong post, Hellion coming from the clouds on the outside, Rising Fast is too far in front however and in the run to the post Rising Fast going to win the Melbourne Cup by two lengths from Hellion!

— Commentator Bill Collins describes the climax of the race

The 1954 Melbourne Cup was a two-mile handicap horse race which took place on Tuesday, 2 November 1954.

Rising Fast became the first and to date only horse to complete The Spring Grand Slam by winning the Caulfield Cup and Cox Plate before winning the Melbourne Cup which was part of a string of seven straight wins. Behind him was 7/1 shot Hellion by 1 1/4 lengths and 200/1 outsider Gay Helios. The race is also noteworthy because the great racecaller Bill Collins called his first Melbourne Cup.

This is the list of placegetters for the 1954 Melbourne Cup.

Place	Name	Jockey	Trainer
1	Rising Fast	Jack Purtell	Ivan J Tucker
2	Hellion	Noel McGrowdie	W. Foster
3	Gay Helios	W Toohey	S. Boyden

== See also ==
- Melbourne Cup
- List of Melbourne Cup winners
- Victoria Racing Club
