= Western Holiday =

- Genre: Variety show
- Starring: Freddie Bamberger; Pam Bamberger; Jackie Clancy; Ted Zeigler
- Country of origin: Australia
- Original language: English

Production
- Running time: 60 minutes

Original release
- Network: HSV-7
- Release: 8 January – 22 January 1960

Western Holiday is an Australian television series which aired in 1960 on Melbourne station HSV-7. The live variety series aired on 8 January, 15 January, and 22 January. The cast included Freddie and Pam Bamberger, Jackie Clancy, and Ted Zeigler.
