= Swallows Parade =

- Genre: Talent show
- Presented by: Doug Elliot
- Country of origin: Australia
- Original language: English

Original release
- Network: HSV-7
- Release: 1957 – 1957

Swallows Parade is an Australian radio and television series. The radio version was broadcast by Melbourne station 3DB in the 1950s, and was also heard on other Major Broadcasting Network stations on a Thursday evening, with auditions being held on Tuesdays. It was presented in front of a live audience from various towns and cities with Major Network outlets.

== Television series ==
The television version was hosted by Doug Elliot and telecast on Melbourne station HSV-7 (early Australian series often aired on a single station as opposed to being networked), and is described as being a talent show, and is notable as one of the first such shows produced for Australian television.

It aired at 8:30PM on Saturdays during 1957. During this period, the same station broadcast another, longer-lived talent show, titled Stairway to the Stars, which ran from 1956 to 1958.

Although HSV-7 was likely making at least some use of kinescope recording by 1957 (it being the method used to record live television prior to the introduction of video-tape to Australia), it is not known if any such recordings of exist of Swallows Parade or Stairway to the Stars. A later Swallow's-sponsored talent contest, a special from 1959 that was hosted by Bert Newton, exists as a 16mm kinescope recording.
