= Saturday Showcase =

- Genre: Variety
- Presented by: Michael Cole
- Country of origin: Australia
- Original language: English

Production
- Running time: 90 minutes

Original release
- Network: HSV-7
- Release: 16 January 1960

Saturday Showcase is an Australian television series that aired in 1960 on Melbourne station HSV-7. Lasting about three months, it was a variety series hosted by Michael Cole. It aired in a 90-minute time-slot. It debuted 16 January.
