= Buy Word =

- Genre: Game show
- Presented by: Larry K. Nixon
- Country of origin: Australia
- Original language: English

Production
- Running time: 30 minutes

Original release
- Network: HSV-7
- Release: 1962

Buy Word is an Australian television series which aired in 1962. It was a game show hosted by American-born Larry K. Nixon, and aired on HSV-7 in Melbourne. Per an April 1962 TV listing, it was preceded on the schedule by Sydney-produced game show Say When! and followed by Armchair Theatre, which consisted of films. A word game, little is known about the series. Its main claim to notability is its host, who for a while was a popular personality on Melbourne television. His other series included Lady for a Day, Auction Day and Answer, Please.
