= John Hinde (broadcaster) =

Australian broadcaster and film reviewer

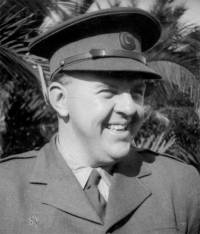
- John Hinde as a war correspondent in 1942
- Born: 26 October 1914; Adelaide, South Australia
- Died: 4 July 2006 (aged 91); Sydney
- Occupations: Film reviewer, news reporter
- Spouse: Barbara Jefferis

John Hamilton Hinde AM (26 October 1914 – 4 July 2006) was an Australian broadcaster and film reviewer. He worked for the Australian Broadcasting Corporation (ABC) for more than 50 years, in both television and radio.

Hinde was also one of Australia's first foreign correspondents, reporting from the Pacific Theater during World War II.

Upon his death he left bequests to fund two awards: a literary prize in honour of his late wife, novelist Barbara Jefferis; and the John Hinde Award, for a science fiction script for film or television.

== Early life and education ==
Born in 1914, Hinde grew up in Adelaide. He started studying medicine at the University of Adelaide, but dropped out and married. After a short-lived marriage he went first to Melbourne and later to Sydney.

== Career ==
=== Journalism ===
In Sydney, Hinde got a job with The Daily Telegraph in 1937, but was sacked by the editor, Syd Deamer, who mistook him for someone else. Hinde then took a job with the Labor Daily, but soon left because of a political disagreement. Deamer later became editor of ABC Weekly and rehired him. Hinde then joined the ABC News and Current Affairs department in 1939 and in the same year married for the second time to Barbara Jefferis, who later became a well-known novelist.

In 1942 Hinde got a break as a war correspondent, after senior correspondent Haydon Lennard was badly injured in a plane crash in New Guinea. Hinde was attached to General Douglas MacArthur's headquarters in 1942, first in Melbourne and then Brisbane, and eventually got to New Guinea and the Pacific.

Hinde was hurt at Hollandia in Netherlands New Guinea, after a Japanese Betty bomber bombed a US Army ammunition dump. His eyes were badly injured, which affected him for the rest of his life.

After the war Hinde returned to Sydney and was responsible for writing the ABC's first television news bulletin. But in 1963, with no career progress, a frustrated Hinde resigned from the ABC and for three years, with his wife earning a good living from her novels, Hinde indulged in electronics, his favourite pastime.

=== Film reviewer ===
After the ABC's previous reviewer, Frank Legg, was killed in a car crash, Hinde was offered freelance work as the film critic. To start with he received £30 and tickets to three movies a week which he then critiqued on a radio show, initially on 2BL, but later on Radio 2 and ABC regional radio.

Hinde made the transition from radio to television, in 1983, and found the switch surprisingly easy. He found though that on television he could not be as critical as on radio, but the value of showing footage made up for that. By 1986 he was doing film reviews every Sunday night as part of the ABC Television news.

=== Comedy ===
Towards the end of his career, Hinde gained a new generation of fans through appearances on comedy programs like Elle McFeast's ABC show McFeast. He was renowned for outrageous skits on the show, even donning high heels and pink tights for McFeast's foray into the Sydney Gay and Lesbian Mardi Gras. He was astonished that he had gained a cult following, saying "When I went to Adelaide recently, young people were stopping me in the street everywhere".

== Recognition ==
On 10 June 2002, Hinde was appointed a Member of the Order of Australia in the Queen's Birthday Honours list "for service to the film and media industry, particularly through the Australian Broadcasting Corporation".

== Later life, death and legacy ==
In 1999, with his eyesight failing and threatened by blindness, he was obliged to retire because he could not watch films properly. The last film that John Hinde presented on the ABC was Odd Man Out, starring James Mason and Kathleen Ryan, on 15 December 1999.

He died on 4 July 2006 in a nursing home in Sydney.

=== John Hinde Award ===
The John Hinde Award for Excellence in Science-Fiction Writing is funded by a bequest left by Hinde. Intended to encourage and reward creativity in science-fiction writing for feature film, television, web series, and interactive media, the award is worth $10,000 for the best produced script, as well as professional support for the best unproduced script. It is administered by the Australian Writers' Guild and awarded at the AWGIE Awards ceremony.

=== Barbara Jefferis Award ===
Upon Hinde's death the Barbara Jefferis Award was created in 2007 in honour of Hinde's late wife of 64 years, Barbara Jefferis. The literary prize will be one of Australia's richest, the result of a $1 million bequest by Hinde.

== See also ==
- Bill Collins
- Ivan Hutchinson
- Margaret Pomeranz
- David Stratton
