= Bill Collins (television presenter) =

Australian film critic (1934–2019)

Bill Collins OAM
- Born: William Roderick Collins; 4 December 1934; Sutherland, New South Wales, Australia
- Died: 20 June 2019 (aged 84); Sydney, Australia
- Other name: Mr. Movies
- Occupations: Film critic and historian; radio and television presenter; journalist; author; lecturer
- Years active: 1963–2018
- Spouse: Joan Collins

William Roderick Collins OAM (4 December 1934 – 20 June 2019) was an Australian film critic and film historian, radio and television presenter, journalist, author and lecturer best known for presenting Hollywood films on television in Australia.

Collins specialised in the era of Classical Hollywood cinema, and his favourite film was Gone with the Wind. He was well known for his association with Network 10, presenting Bill Collins' Golden Years of Hollywood for fifteen years, and later with Foxtel, presenting movies on the cable channel FOX Classics from 1995 to 2018.

== Biography ==
Bill Collins was born in Sutherland, Sydney, the son of a policeman and school teacher. He was educated at Canterbury Boys' High School and the University of Sydney, where he obtained a Bachelor of Arts with Honours in Latin in 1959, a Diploma of Education in 1960 and a Master of Education in 1965.

Originally an English school teacher at East Hills Boys High School and his alma mater Canterbury Boys' High School, and later lecturer at Sydney Teachers College, Collins' appreciation of cinema led him to write reviews in the early 1960s and resulted in him working as a film presenter for the Australian Broadcasting Corporation (then the Australian Broadcasting Commission). He moved from the ABC to TCN Channel 9 working there between 1967 and 1974; later moving to ATN Channel 7 from 1975 to 1979. In 1980 he moved to Channel Ten to present movies nationally.

In the late 1970s he worked as a reviewer of teachers in Sydney high schools. He was widely recognised in Australia for his passionate enthusiasm for films, and his profile allowed him to meet and become acquainted with a range of film makers from the "Golden Age of Hollywood". His presentations usually consisted of a brief review of the film and its actors, specific discussion of filming techniques, theme music, as well as personal recollections and quotes from the film makers he had interviewed. From 23 October 1995 until his retirement on 20 October 2018, he presented films for the Foxtel cable television network FOX Classics. His celebrity status allowed him to take cameo roles in film and television, notably Prisoner (1985) and Howling III (1987).

In addition to his television work, he lectured at the University of Sydney on film and related subjects. In 1987, he published a book of film reviews and essays, Bill Collins Presents "The Golden Years of Hollywood".

== Personal life ==
Collins met his wife Joan in 1983 when he was 48. They both lived in Vincentia, New South Wales. From Vincentia they moved to Winmalee, New South Wales. In 2005, they moved to a large house in Berry, New South Wales, which they listed for sale in August 2017, but which Joan still owned as of February 2020.

Collins died in his sleep on 20 June 2019.

== Awards and honours ==
In 1987, Collins was awarded the Medal of the Order of Australia (OAM) for services to film and television. In 2009, he was inducted into the Logies Hall of Fame. In 2013, he received the inaugural ASTRA Lifetime Achievement Award.

== See also ==
- Ivan Hutchinson
- John Hinde
- Margaret Pomeranz
- David Stratton
