= Handyman (TV series) =

- Genre: Lifestyle
- Presented by: Jack Easton; Colin Burns
- Country of origin: Australia
- Original language: English

Production
- Running time: 15 minutes

Original release
- Network: HSV-7
- Release: 1957 – 1958

Handyman is an Australian television series which aired on Melbourne station HSV-7 from 1957 to 1958. Originally hosted by Jack Easton, it was later hosted by Colin Burns. It aired live, and consisted of "hints to the home handyman". It aired in a 15-minute time-slot on Sundays, later moved to Saturdays. It is not known if any of these episodes were kinescoped.

A different Handyman aired on ABV-2 around the same time.
