= The Penthouse Club =

- Genre: Variety
- Presented by: Michael Williamson; Mary Hardy
- Country of origin: Australia
- Original language: English

Production
- Producer: Garry Stewart

Original release
- Network: Seven Network
- Release: 10 October 1970 – 1978

The Penthouse Club is an Australian weekly variety program produced live to air from the studios of HSV-7 Melbourne from 10 October 1970. It was originally hosted by Michael Williamson (also a football commentator for HSV) and comedian Mary Hardy.

== Production and synopsis ==
The program, screening each Saturday night from around 8.30 pm (the starting time varied over the years depending on HSV-7's Saturday night VFL football commitments), was a mix of comedy, light entertainment and live coverage of harness racing from the RAS Showgrounds and, later, Moonee Valley racecourse. The weekly lottery draw Tattslotto was incorporated as a segment in the program from around 1972. The Penthouse Club was considered a welcome alternative on Saturday nights which is often regarded as a wasteland of reruns and low-grade movies on other channels. The long-time musical director for the program was Ivan Hutchinson.

In 1978, Williamson was replaced by Ernie Sigley and the program was retitled Saturday Night Live (with no relation to the NBC show) in 1979. Hardy left the program during 1978. The predecessor programs were Sunnyside Up and Club Seven.

== Similar programs ==
Rival television network Network Ten station ATV-10 attempted to resurrect the format in 1980 with little success.

Also during the 1970s, Network Ten's Adelaide station ADS-7 produced their own version of The Penthouse Club with Bob Francis, Anne Wills and Sandy Roberts, with the program and presenters winning a number of Logie Awards for popularity in South Australia.

In 1979 John Cootes was appointed as John Singleton's replacement as host of Channel 10's Saturday Night Live program.
