= Mike Williamson (broadcaster) =

Mike Williamson (OAM)
- Born: Michael Francis Williamson; June 1928; Australia
- Died: 2 May 2019 (aged 90); Australia
- Occupations: Sports commentator, television presenter

Michael Francis Williamson OAM (June 1928 – 2 May 2019) was an Australian sports commentator and television presenter

== Career ==
Williamson was a well-performed professional runner. Having been banned from professional foot-running for "running dead", he became a sports commentator of Australian rules football matches in the Victorian Football League with radio stations 3AK and 3AW before joining the HSV-7 television station in 1959 as part of its VFL football broadcast team.

Significant moments in Williamson's commentary career include the 1966 VFL Grand Final, when St Kilda won their first premiership, as well as the 1970 VFL Grand Final in which Williamson exclaimed "Jesaulenko, you beauty!" when Carlton player Alex Jesaulenko took a dramatic contested mark. "Jesaulenko, you beauty!" became one of the most famous quotations in the history of Australian rules. The words were part of numerous advertising campaigns, including one for Carlton Draught, as well as a 2006 Toyota Legendary Moments campaign featuring Jesaulenko himself.

As well as commentating, Williamson was involved with general announcing duties at both 3AK and 3AW. Staff at 3AW gave him the nickname "Scoop", a reference to his midday program Radio Roundsman, featuring interviews with people making news around Melbourne. He also compèred the TAA Hit Parade, a 6:00 pm Sunday program featuring the eight top tunes of the week.

At HSV-7, he compèred a number of variety and quiz shows, the most notable being Tell the Truth and The Penthouse Club. The latter was co-hosted by Mary Hardy, who later compèred the show with others, including Bill Collins and Ernie Sigley.

Williamson died on 2 May 2019, at the age of 90.

== Honours ==
Williamson retired in 1977 and was awarded the Medal of the Order of Australia in 2006 for his charity work with the Royal Children's Hospital raising money for leukaemia research.
