= Hit Parade (TV series) =

- Genre: Music television
- Country of origin: Australia
- Original language: English
- No. of seasons: 1

Production
- Running time: 30 minutes

Original release
- Network: HSV-7
- Release: 1956 – 1959

The Hit Parade is an early Australian television pop music series which aired on the Seven Network's HSV-7 from 1956 to 1959. It is often mentioned in books discussing Australian television of the 1950s.

The series presented hit recordings, which were danced to and lip-synced by the cast ("The Hit Paraders"), often presenting the songs in settings with sets and costumes (anticipating the music video). Over 20 episodes of this series are held by National Film and Sound Archive, along with a few episodes of These Were the Hits, a similar series.

== See also ==
- The Dotty Mack Show – U.S. series in which popular recordings were lip-synced by cast
