= Ernie Sigley =

Australian television personality (1938–2021)

- Ernie Sigley - Radio and television presenter
- Born: Ernest William Sigley; 2 September 1938; Footscray, Victoria, Australia
- Died: 15 August 2021 (aged 82)
- Other name: Ernie Williams
- Occupations: Radio personality; television host; singer
- Years active: 1957–1993 (television); 1952–2009 (radio)
- Known for: "The Ernie Sigley Show"; "Saturday Night Live"; "Wheel of Fortune"; "In Melbourne Today"

Ernest William Sigley (2 September 1938 – 15 August 2021) was an Australian Gold Logie award winning television host, comedian, variety performer, radio presenter and singer. Known as a pioneer of radio and television in Australian, he was often styled as a "little Aussie battler" with a larrikin sense of humour.

Sigley started his career in radio, before becoming a presenter of TV programs and was best known for his self-titled program The Ernie Sigley Show and Saturday Night Live as well as original host of game show Wheel of Fortune, after presenting talk shows with his frequent co-presenter Denise Drysdale in the late 80s and early 90s, he returned to presenting radio broadcasts, until retiring in 2009.

== Biography ==
=== Early life and career ===
Sigley was born in Footscray, Melbourne, one of seven children of a boilermaker. After completing his education at Williamstown High School, his career began in 1952 as a turntable operator on Danny Webb's breakfast program at radio station 3DB.

Television started in Australia in 1956 and Sigley made his TV debut in 1957 as host of Teenage Mailbag, later known as The Teenage Show, on Seven Network's HSV-7. Shortly after this, he travelled to London, gaining some work experience at the BBC. But a bigger break was to come with a three-year stint at Radio Luxembourg, where he performed under the name "Ernie Williams".

Sigley is remembered for his 1964 association with the Adelaide leg of the Beatles' tour of Australia. In one press conference, his questioning of the Beatles brought about an enthusiastic response from John Lennon, which led to one of the more notable interviews of the tour.

=== Radio ===
In 1981, Sigley returned to 3DB to host the breakfast program. In 1982, he switched to the breakfast shift at the personality-driven News Talk 3UZ. In 1996, Sigley joined 3AW to host the afternoon program. He hosted the afternoon program for 12 years until his retirement on 7 November 2008. Denis Walter was announced as Sigley's replacement. He then took on a part-time role at the station where he partnered either Bruce Mansfield or Philip Brady to host Nightline on Friday nights.

=== Television ===
Sigley was part of the original cast of variety TV program Sunnyside Up, In the 1960s and early 1970s, he hosted the prime time Adelaide variety show Adelaide Tonight on NWS-9.

Beginning in 1974, he was the host of the national Nine Network variety show The Ernie Sigley Show, featuring notable Australian media personalities such as Denise Drysdale, Noni Hazlehurst, Pete Smith and Joy Westmore. The program was abruptly axed after an off-air outburst by Sigley, directed at station owner Kerry Packer and producer Peter Faiman, when the network cut short his first show for 1976 to accommodate a network sports awards telecast. Packer flew to Melbourne the next day and dismissed Sigley in person, effective immediately, and replaced him with Don Lane.

After his dismissal in 1976, Sigley moved to ATV-0 and hosted the early evening variety show Ernie and then, in 1978, The Penthouse which became Saturday Night Live on HSV-7 co-hosting with Mary Hardy.

Sigley was the original host of the Australian version of the popular game show Wheel of Fortune from 1981 to 1984. In 1982, he presented the regional variety program Six Tonight from BTV-6 in Ballarat and the daytime talent show Pot Luck in 1987.

After a break from television, Sigley returned in 1989 with Denise Drysdale, hosting GTV-9's morning program In Melbourne Today.

Sigley was involved in an argument with fellow TV star Don Lane at a Logies after party in 1988, when Sigley allegedly made insulting remarks about Lane's partner.

=== Singing ===
Sigley began singing as a choir boy at St Paul's Cathedral, Melbourne, and went on to be a regular on the local town hall circuit in the 1950s. In 1957, his first record, "Love Is A Golden Ring", was released.

In 1974, Sigley, with Denise Drysdale, recorded the popular duet "Hey Paula", a cover of a hit by US duo Paul & Paula released by Festival Records and produced at Armstrong Studios, Melbourne. The record was produced and arranged by Brian Rangott and engineered by Ian McKenzie and peaked at number 2 in Australia.

Sigley regularly performed around Australia on the club circuit, often with his television partner Denise Drysdale.

== Awards ==
Sigley won the TV Week Gold Logie Award for Most Popular Personality on Australian Television in 1975. He had previously won eleven local Logies for his work in Adelaide.

== Personal life ==
Three times married and twice divorced, Sigley was married to Glenys O'Brien, a former television personality, for 47 years. They lived in Atkins Ave, Glen Iris in the eastern suburbs of Melbourne and had four children. His son Matthew was a keyboardist for the Australian bands the Earthmen, the Fauves and Drop City.

Sigley was a supporter of the Western Bulldogs (formerly known as the Footscray Football Club) in the Australian Football League. He was also a supporter of the South Adelaide Football Club in the South Australian National Football League.

Sigley once owned the Radio Springs Hotel at Lyonville in country Victoria.

Sigley and his wife were ambassadors for CBM Australia, a charity that works with people with disabilities in developing countries, and visited projects in Vietnam and Tanzania.

Sigley's family announced in October 2016 that he had Alzheimer's disease. He died on 15 August 2021, aged 82.

== Filmography ==
=== Selected TV ===
Production	Year	Role	Network
Teenage Mailbag (TV series)	1957	Host	Seven Network (HSV-7)
The Teenage Show (TV series)	1958–1959	Host	?
Adelaide Tonight (TV series)	1959-1973	co-host, Host	Nine Network (NWS-9)
The Annual TV Week Logie Awards	1968–1974/1976-1979	As himself	Nine Network
Countdown (TV series)	1974	Guest	ABC
Ernie (TV series)	1976	Host	Ten Network
This is Your Life Mary Hardy	1978	Guest	Seven Network
The Don Lane Show	8.6.81	Guest	Nine Network
Wheel of Fortune (TV series)	1981	Host	Seven Network
'Video from Hell (Video)	1985	Himself	Direct
In Melbourne Today (TV series)	1989	Host	Nine Network
Ernie and Denise (TV series)	1993	Host	Nine Network
The Late Show (TV series)	1993	Himself	
Good Morning Australia	2004	Guest	Ten Network
The Man from Dame Edna (TV movie documentary)	2008	Radio Presenter	

== Actor ==
Production	Year	Role
Jack and the Beanstalk (TV movie)	1964	Miffin
The Story of Dick Whittington (TV movie)	1966	Robin
Dead Man's Float	1980	Snarks

=== Studio albums ===
List of albums, with Australian chart positions
Title	Album details	Peak chart positions
Title	Album details	AUS
Ernie	Released: 1969; Format: LP; Label: RCA Camden (CAMS-147)	-
Ernie Sigley	Released: November 1971; Format: LP; Label: RCA (SL101964)	30
...And Here's Ernie	Released: December 1974; Format: LP; Label: Festival Records (L 35383)	44

=== Charting singles ===
List of singles, with Australian chart positions
Year	Title	Peak chart positions	Certification
Year	Title	AUS	Certification
1957	"Love is a Golden Ring "/"I Happened Again"	9	
1961	"Mary's Boy Child"/"Brush Those Tears from Your Eyes"	57	
1965	"Think About Me" / "Mona Lisa"	52	
1966	"Hey! Girl" / "It's Almost Tomorrow"	73	
1967	"True Love" / "A Boy Without a Girl"	76	
1967	"A Clown Am I" / "A Million Years or So"	86	
1970	"Give Me Love"/"A Little Thing Called Love"	99	
1971	"City of Angels"	69	
1974	"Hey Paula" (with Denise Drysdale)	2	AUS: Gold
1974	"Just Thank Me"	94	
