= Ivan Hutchinson =

Film critic and television personality

- Promotional image of Hutchinson c. 1986
- Born: 11 February 1928; Melbourne, Victoria, Australia
- Died: 7 October 1995 (aged 67); Melbourne, Victoria, Australia
- Occupations: film critic, television personality, Music Director for HSV-7
- Years active: 1964–1994

Ivan Joseph Hutchinson (11 February 1928 – 7 October 1995) was an Australian film critic, television personality and music director.

== Career ==
Hutchinson was active in the Australian entertainment industry for over 30 years, from the early 1960s until the mid-1990s, first on Melbourne only programs for HSV-7 and later nationwide through the entire Seven Network.

In the early 1970s he appeared alongside film and TV journalist Jim Murphy on Channel 7 in probably Australian TV's first regularly scheduled evening movie review program entitled Two on the Aisle. Hutchinson later moved into the roles of midday and classic movie host and appeared in several local film cameos, usually playing himself or a critic.

In his last years, Hutchinson was a film columnist for The Sun News-Pictorial and its successor, the Herald Sun.

In addition to his on-air role for Seven, Hutchinson was a studio and session pianist, serving as the band leader, arranger and music director for most of the variety shows, children's programs, and specials originating from HSV-7 throughout 1960 to 1994; including Sunnyside Up and The Penthouse Club.

== See also ==
- Bill Collins
- John Hinde
- Margaret Pomeranz
- David Stratton
