= Sunnyside Up =

Australian television series

Sunnyside-Up is a Australian black and white weekly variety program produced at HSV-7 Melbourne, during the late 1950s until the mid 1960s. Surviving Kinescope episodes sometimes presented the title in three words as “Sunny Side Up“ and with a 3-letter acronym.

== Synopsis ==
The program had its genesis as a television version of the radio variety program The Happy Gang on HSV-7's sister radio station 3DB. The first television edition of The Happy Gang was shown on HSV-7 on 30 August 1957 at 9.30pm and broadcast every Friday.

From 23 May 1958, under the direction of producer Alf Spargo, the program was revamped with a refreshed line-up and a new title, Sunnyside Up. Original Happy Gang cast members Dick Cranbourne and John Stuart were dropped from the revamped show.

The new Sunnyside Up was hosted by Bill Collins, with comedy by Syd Heylen (Sydney from Sydney), Honest John Gilbert, Syd Hollister, Maurie Fields and Val Jellay. Singers included Shirlene Clancy, Ron Lees, Val Ruff, Tony Jenkins and Neil Williams. The Chordaires were a regular vocal group, as well as The Thin Men from 1960 to 1965 before they moved to Sydney to work on television there.

Musical selections were eclectic and ambitious from latest pop hits, overseas show tunes, to operetta and contemporary ballet. A relatively large studio orchestra for television was under the direction of Jimmy Allan. Ivan Hutchinson began his career-long association with HSV-7 as a pianist on the show.

The final episode of Sunnyside Up appeared on HSV-7 on 17 June 1966.

A reunion of the cast of Sunnyside Up was planned for March 1973 as part of HSV-7's coverage of the opening of the annual Moomba Festival, but the segment was dropped at the last moment when the production was outsourced to Crawford Productions.

== Notable Guests ==
Helen Reddy and Olivia Newton-John also appeared on the show before gaining fame overseas.

== Logie Awards ==
Host Bill Collins won a Logie Award in 1959 in the Outstanding Performance category.

The program, which was produced and written by Spargo, won a state award in 1962 for Most Popular Program in Victoria.

== Theme ==
The theme song played under the opening titles and sung by the full cast in the finale was "(Keep Your) Sunny Side Up" by DeSylva, Brown and Henderson from the 1929 American musical film Sunny Side Up.

The predecessor program was Club Seven. The successor was The Penthouse Club.

== Similar program in Adelaide ==
ADS-7 Adelaide had a similar program On The Sunnyside compered by Blair Schwartz, with Mary MacGregor, Mary McMahon, Lynn Seward, Mike Neil, Rick Paterson, Angela Stacey, Ian Boyce and the ADS7 Ballet. The "Over The Fence" comedy segment featured Peter Celier and Max Lawler. In 1962 On The Sunnyside became The Sunnyside Show.
