= Football Inquest =

- Genre: Sports
- Presented by: Ian Johnson (1957); Phil Gibbs (1957); Jack Mueller (1957); Michael Williamson (1960s-70s)
- Country of origin: Australia
- Original language: English

Original release
- Network: GTV-9 (1957); HSV-7 (1960s-70s)
- Release: 20 April 1957 – 1974

Football Inquest is the name of two Australian television series, which both aired in Melbourne. The first aired 1957 on GTV-9, while the second aired 1960-1974(?) on HSV-7. There was also a South Australian version.

== 1957 ==
The 1957 version was an early Australian television series which ran from 20 April 1957 to 21 September 1957 on Melbourne television station GTV-9. It was a half-hour weekly series broadcast on Saturdays at 7:30PM.

Hosted by Ian Johnson, Phil Gibbs and Jack Mueller, the series featured also featured V.F.L. players. Sam Loxton was later a regular. The program was simulcast over GTV-9 and 3KZ. Little else is known about the television program, but the radio version certainly predated the simulcast.

== 1960-1974 ==
Hosted by Michael Williamson, the second version was a panel discussion series which debuted 9 April 1960. It ran for several seasons, the last aired in 1974(?) . During its first season, the series was broadcast on Saturdays at 7:00PM, competing in the time-slot against Pick a Box on GTV-9 and the evening news on ABV-2

== South Australia ==
A South Australian version ran on Channel 9 in Adelaide in the 1960s and 1970s. Panellists included Max Hall, Ken Cunningham, Lindsay Head, Stan Wickham and Bo Morton.

== See also ==
- List of Australian television series
