= Football Survey =

- Genre: Sports
- Presented by: Ian Johnson; Sam Loxton
- Country of origin: Australia
- Original language: English

Production
- Production locations: Melbourne, Victoria
- Running time: 10 minutes

Original release
- Network: GTV-9
- Release: 29 April 1957 – 1957

Football Survey is an Australian television series which aired in 1957. Broadcast at 7:50PM on Mondays on Melbourne station GTV-9, it was a series in which Australian rules football personalities discussed the weekend matches, and aired in a 10-minute time-slot. It was sponsored by Brylcreem, and was originally hosted by Ian Johnson, later by Sam Loxton.

The series aired against U.S. series Disneyland on HSV-7 and US series Sherlock Holmes on ABV-2.

== See also ==
- List of Australian television series
