= Jane Bunn =

Australian meteorologist and weather presenter (born 1979)

- Born: Australia
- Education: Firbank Grammar School; Monash University; Pennsylvania State University
- Occupations: Meteorologist, weather presenter
- Employer: Seven Network
- Known for: Seven News Melbourne

Jane Bunn is an Australian meteorologist and weather presenter.

Bunn is the weather presenter on Seven News Melbourne.

== Career ==
Jane completed a Bachelor of Science at Monash University in 2005, where she had majors in Atmospheric Science and Mathematics. During her degree, she spent a semester abroad studying at Pennsylvania State University. In 2006, Jane was selected to undertake a Graduate Diploma of Meteorology provided by the Bureau of Meteorology. After completing her degree, she was posted to work as a weather forecaster in Sydney, then Canberra and finally at RAAF's Williamtown base.

In June 2009, Jane was appointed as weather presenter on WIN News Victoria, where she garnered a loyal following – particularly with farmers reliant on her bulletins.

In June 2014, Jane resigned from WIN News Victoria after five years to work on a new project; she was replaced by Britt Ditterich. After leaving WIN News she became a fill in weather presenter on ABC News Breakfast and ABC News Victoria.

In November 2014, the Seven Network announced that Jane would be joining the Seven News Melbourne team replacing Jo Silvagni. Jane began her new role in December.

Jane has also been a weather contributor on Today and 3AW covering severe weather events, including the Queensland floods and Victoria's Black Saturday bush fires.

== Personal life ==
In 2006, Jane married Michael, an IT consultant, and the couple live in Melbourne.

Bunn grew up in Melbourne's bayside suburbs and attended Firbank Grammar School during her high school years.

She supports St Kilda Football Club in the Australian Football League.
