= Bruno Bouchet =

Australian radio producer

Bruno Bernard Bouchet
- Born: Bruno Bernard Bouchet; 19 February 1986 (age 40); Sydney, Australia
- Occupations: broadcast producer and radio personality
- Years active: 2004–present
- Spouse: Laura Bouchet (2008–present)

Bruno Bouchet (born 19 February 1986 in Sydney, Australia) is a broadcast producer and radio personality.

== Early life and education ==
Bouchet was born to French migrants in Brisbane, Australia. Bouchet's mother, Annick, had previously hosted music and talk radio shows in Perth, Western Australia. On completion of seventh grade, Bouchet left Nudgee Junior College for Marist College Ashgrove. It was during high school that, at the age of 15, Bouchet first started in radio, hosting a 3-hour talk show on Switch 1197 called The Speak Up Show.

In September 2004, Bouchet appeared on the SBS television program Insight where he had a heated argument with Graham Perrett, the Australian Labor Party's candidate for the federal seat of Moreton, over the issue of private school funding. Perrett was employed as a teacher at Marist College Ashgrove, a private school, at the same time that Bouchet was a student. Later in the show he was howled down by the panel of guests for stating that: “...(Iraq) at the moment, it's in the reconstruction phase, it's all positive from here".

In February 2004, Bouchet anchored Switch 1197's broadcast of the 2004 Queensland State Election from the official tally room at the Brisbane Entertainment Centre.

== Career ==
=== Brisbane ===
In 2004, Bouchet was hired as the producer of talkback station 4BC 1116am's weekend mornings show. During this time, Bouchet also worked as a casual researcher for the Seven Network's Today Tonight program as well as writing stories for Quest Community Newspapers. Later that year, Bouchet moved onto a weekday breakfast show hosted by Peter Dick and Ross Davie.

During his time at 4BC Bouchet produced shows for Greg Cary, Claire Blake, Chris Adams, Dean Miller, Rupert McCall, Rod Tiley and John Miller.

In 2006, Bouchet moved to the Brisbane bureau of the Nine Network's A Current Affair program where he worked as associate-producer for Brisbane-based reporters.

In January 2007, Bouchet moved to the Australian Radio Network where he produced the 4KQ Classic Hits breakfast program as well as associate-producing the Brisbane|97.3FM breakfast show.

=== Sydney ===
In February 2008, Bouchet took on the role of Producer with the Sonia Kruger and Todd McKenney breakfast show on Mix 106.5 Sydney as well as producing the Body & Soul program hosted by Marnie T. In November 2009, Bouchet was appointed as the Executive Producer of Mix 106.5's breakfast show.

From June 2010 until July 2012, Bouchet worked at 2Day FM as the Guest and Talent Producer on The Kyle & Jackie O Show.

In May 2004, Bouchet used his Switch 1197 radio show to accuse Federal Opposition Leader Mark Latham of plagiarising a policy idea that Bouchet claims he had developed. Bouchet claimed that he had originally come up with a "learn or earn" policy and that Latham had taken it off him without any proper acknowledgement. A spokesperson for Latham denied the claims of plagiarism.

In February 2011, 2Day FM was pressured to sack Bouchet following comments he made on air during The Kyle & Jackie O Show about organ donation and the fact that he would never even consider donating his own.

After Crikey contacted Bouchet about the appropriateness of some of the content on his website, "Bruno loves boobs", he removed the website. The website featured images of a man dressed in a fancy dress costume made to look like a used sanitary pad; a video of a man apparently beating up a woman in front of her child, and an "anti-Obama sticker slapped on a car featuring the phrase 'Don’t re-nig in 2012'", which Crikey deemed racist.

=== 2Day FM termination ===
Bouchet was fired from his job as guest and talent producer at 2Day FM on 23 July 2012 after making jokes on Twitter about a shooting in a movie theatre in the US state of Colorado. He told media website Mumbrella that he did not realise the seriousness of the situation and had been drinking. A spokesman for the network said that Bouchet had been terminated because his comments violated the network's social media policy.

In a statement, 2Day FM's Sydney general manager, Jeremy Simpson, said: “Southern Cross Austereo has a strict social media policy that all staff must adhere to, and Bruno's activity on Twitter was in breach of this policy. It is for this reason that Bruno's employment has been terminated, effective immediately".

The 2Day FM website was quick to remove most references about Bouchet, with his profile on the Kyle and Jackie O 'team' page disappearing along with all photo galleries with Bouchet's photos. Bouchet issued a statement in an article he wrote on media website Mumbrella apologising.

== Awards ==
Bouchet is a four-time Australian Commercial Radio Award finalist. In September 2009, Bouchet was part of a team that took out the Australian Commercial Radio Award for Best Music Special.

Bouchet was twice a finalist for the Australian Commercial Radio Award's Best Newcomer Off-Air category (2005 & 2006). In 2008 Bouchet received his third nomination, this time for Best Multimedia Execution.

Year	Nominee / work	Award	Result
2005	Bruno Bouchet	Best Newcomer Off-Air	Nominated
2006	Bruno Bouchet	Best Newcomer Off-Air	Nominated
2008	Mix Mornings	Best Multimedia Execution	Nominated
2009	Chris-Mas-Isaak	Best Music Special	Won

== Personal life ==
Since March 2008, Bouchet has been dating Laura Bouchet, radio executive producer. They are now married and have a daughter, Juliette.
