= Zig and Zag (Australian performers) =

Australian clown duo, primarily in TV programs for children

- Zig and Zag, Jack Perry (left) and Doug McKenzie (right), 1998
- Notable work: Peters Fun Fair

Comedy career
- Years active: 1956–1999
- Medium: Television, radio
- Genres: Clown, slapstick
- Former members: Jack Perry; Douglas McKenzie

Zig and Zag, were an entertainer clown duo from Melbourne consisting of Jack Asher Perry (31 December 1916 – 22 June 2006) and Douglas McKenzie (22 March 1918 – 4 August 2004), respectively. Both had been born in England and migrated to Australia. They became notable for appearing on Australian television from its inception in 1956 until 1999 beginning with Peters Fun Fair (1956–69). They also featured on the annual Moomba parade (a community festival), and were regulars at annual charity events including the Good Friday Appeal to raise funds Royal Children's Hospital.

Perry was also an actor on television serials and presenter whilst McKenzie, was also a radio and television presenter, producer and former World War II soldier.

In March 1999 it was revealed that Jack Perry had been convicted in 1994 of the indecent assault of his granddaughter, which caused considerable controversy and the duo subsequently parted ways.

== History ==
=== Radio and Television ===
Zig and Zag were the clown duo of Jack Perry and Doug McKenzie; they began performing together in the 1950s in Melbourne. By 1952, McKenzie was voicing radio advertisements on 3XY dressed as a clown with a then young Bert Newton. This led to Zig and Zag regularly appearing on a Saturday morning children's show hosted by Frank Thring, alongside Newton and disc jockey, Stan Rofe. The clown duo first worked on their own show on 3XY's Tye's Radio Revue on Sundays and Peters Town Hall Show on Thursdays. In March 1956 they drove a toy car at their first Moomba parade and were crowd favourite's at the annual festival.

The Seven Network local TV station HSV7 broadcast the first episode of Peters Fun Fair on 10 November 1956, with the duo as its stars in the first children's session televised in Australia. They dressed in costumes advertising the series sponsor Peters Ice Cream, it had been common of that time for TV programs to be named for their sponsors) with the slogan, "the health food of a nation", and used the catchphrase, "No-o-o trouble".

Zig and Zag added their theme song, "You and Me", to their act in the late 1950s. It was written by Tommy Steele and was originally performed by Steele and Jimmy Edwards in the 1958 London pantomime production of Rodgers and Hammerstein's Cinderella. Peters Fun Fair also featured Roy Lyons as Cousin Roy, and continued for 13 years.

For audiences who watched television during that era, the duo is associated with an incident involving the King Street Bridge. Following a structural failure in July 1962, they filmed a television segment where they dropped a coconut, jokingly insinuating that they caused the damage. Aditionally, Zig and Zag participated in the annual HSV7 Good Friday Appeal, a telethon benefiting the Royal Children's Hospital, for over forty years.

In mid-February 1999, Zig and Zag were named as Moomba Monarchs, a festival that they had been associated with for 44 years, and crowned as Kings of Moomba at Melbourne Town Hall. They were stood down before the associated Moomba parade, in March. Revelations of Perry's indecent assaults on his granddaughter, from his 1994 trial, were broadcast on current affairs show Today Tonight. Since the duo's act was always aimed at children, it was irreparably ruined, and after the scandal, McKenzie never spoke to Perry again.

== Members ==
=== Jack Perry: Zig ===
Jack Perry
- Born: Jack Asher Perry; 31 December 1916; London, England
- Died: 22 June 2006 (aged 89); Melbourne, Victoria, Australia
- Other name: Zig
- Occupations: Comedian, TV presenter and actor
- Years active: 1956–1999
- Known for: Zig and Zag

Jack Perry (Zig) was born on 31 December 1916 in London, England. During World War II he worked for Sutton Tool & Gauge, Melbourne which was a company listed as an "essential service" and so he did not enlist in the armed forces. After the war he turned to radio and, for 20 weeks, worked on 3UZ's Are You an Artist?. He later worked as an adult comedian at coffee lounges. By May 1958 he was married with three children.

Perry made many TV appearances outside his clown character, including as an actor in drama series such as Homicide, Division 4 (1970), Matlock Police (1971) and Prisoner (in nine episodes from 1979 to 1985). He had a supporting role in the feature film Dimboola (1979). Perry appeared in the 1997 TV series State Coroner. In November 2006, it was reported that Perry had died in April, aged around 88–89, with furniture marked "Heritage" and "Once belonged to Zig the Clown" being sold by the Salvation Army's South Melbourne store. His vintage Peters Ice Cream cylindrical hat was held at Australian Centre for the Moving Image museum in Federation Square; it apparently dates back to the 1950s

=== Doug McKenzie: Zag ===
Douglas McKenzie
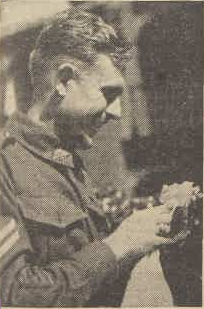
- Doug McKenzie, former Changi P.O.W., November 1945. He is holding a mock version of the Melbourne Cup.
- Born: 22 March 1918; Gloucester, England
- Died: 4 August 2004 (aged 86); Melbourne, Victoria, Australia
- Other name: Zag
- Occupations: Comedian, soldier, TV and radio presenter, TV producer
- Years active: 1939–1999
- Known for: Zig and Zag

Douglas McKenzie (Zag) was born on 22 March 1918 in Gloucester, England. He later recalled that his father was "in heavy drama, graduated to producing, and finally wrote his own shows." His mother, Violet (née Viola Rene), was a soprano; the couple toured as a pantomime act and visited New Zealand before settling in Australia. Before 1939 McKenzie was a junior announcer on a Melbourne radio station known then as 3XY.

McKenzie enlisted in the Australian Army on 12 July 1940 during World War II and, seven months after the fall of Singapore, became a prisoner of war at Changi. As a corporal, McKenzie and another prisoner, Bill West, annually ran a mock version of the Melbourne Cup in the prison by using bull frogs. In 1942 his frog, Greenbottle, won the mock cup trophy: made of cardboard, which McKenzie cherished upon return to Australia in 1945 (see photo above). He was discharged on 17 January 1946.

Whilst appearing on-air as Zag, he also produced many programs for HSV7, including Club 7, Hold Everything and Junior Jamboree. In 2002 McKenzie was the inaugural recipient of Variety's Heart of Show Business Award. Doug Christie, chairman of Variety, the children's charity, said that McKenzie was awarded for his long service to "Melbourne's entertainment industry and his commitment to children's charity". McKenzie died on 4 August 2004, aged 86.

== Child abuse scandal ==
In March 1999, Zig and Zag stood down from the Moomba Festival after they had been announced as Moomba Monarchs. It was disclosed that, in 1994, at Heidelberg Magistrates' Court, Perry had "pleaded guilty to seven counts of unlawful indecent assault against his granddaughter" Debra Clark, which had occurred "from the age of 12, between 1979 and 1981, while she lived with her grandparents". In 1999, other allegations of indecent assault of children also surfaced. Clark revealed that she had been indecently assaulted by Perry, during an interview with Tracee Hutchison on the television current affairs show Today Tonight just before Perry (as Zig) with McKenzie (as Zag), were due to be crowned. McKenzie revealed in February 2000 that he had supported Perry at his 1994 trial, "If you're a parent, it's quite common that kids will come along and get into bed with you on a Sunday morning or something like that. And being easy going I suppose, I was probably wrong (but I believed it had involved something like that)." In 1999 the Moomba committee was devastated; they announced that there would be no replacement for the duo. Subsequent festivals had no monarch until 2010 when singer Kate Ceberano and music commentator Molly Meldrum were announced as Queen and King of Moomba, respectively.
