= The Footy Show (1957 TV program) =

1957–1958 Australian TV series

- Genre: Sports
- Presented by: Doug Elliot; Jack Dyer
- Country of origin: Australia
- Original language: English

Production
- Running time: 30 minutes

Original release
- Network: HSV-7
- Release: 12 April 1957 – 19 September 1958

The Footy Show is an Australian television program which was broadcast on the Seven Network, Melbourne television station HSV-7. It was broadcast on Fridays from 12 April 1957 to 20 September 1957, and again from 4 April 1958 to 19 September 1958.

== Broadcast ==
The program was presented by Australian footballers Doug Elliot and Jack Dyer, along with fellow VFL football players. It was a 30-minute program.

== See also ==
- List of Australian television series
