= Stairway to the Stars (TV series) =

1956–1958 Australian TV series

- Genre: Talent show
- Presented by: Eric Pearce; Geoff McComas
- Country of origin: Australia
- Original language: English

Original release
- Network: HSV-7
- Release: 9 November 1956 – November 1958

Stairway to the Stars is an early Australian television series that aired on Melbourne station HSV-7. The first episode aired 9 November 1956, with the series ending circa November 1958.

Hosts of the series included Eric Pearce for early episodes and Geoff McComas for later episodes.

Originally broadcast on Fridays, it later moved to Wednesdays. Competition in the time-slot varied. At first, since HSV-7 was the only station in Melbourne, the series had no competition in the time-slot. By March 1957 the series competed against U.S. series Alfred Hitchcock Presents on GTV-9 and UK series The World is Ours on ABV-2. By November 1958 episodes competed against U.S. comedy series Susie on GTV-9, while ABV-2 featured Election Talk and UK series Fabian of the Yard.

The series was a talent show. For example, the episode broadcast 21 December 1956 featured a pop vocalist, a soprano, a dancer, a tenor, and a saxophonist, as well as Sonia Korn as the guest.

== External ==
- Stairway to the Stars at IMDb
