= Ron Casey (Melbourne broadcaster) =

Australian broadcaster (1927–2000)

Ron Casey AM MBE
- Born: Ronald Patrick Casey; 28 December 1927; Melbourne, Victoria, Australia
- Died: 19 June 2000 (aged 72); Melbourne, Victoria, Australia
- Occupations: TV presenter, sports journalist and radio host
- Years active: 1948−1996

Ronald Patrick Casey AM, MBE (28 December 1927 – 19 June 2000) was a Melbourne-based Australian rules football administrator, sporting commentator and radio and television pioneer.

== Radio roles ==
Casey was a Melbourne sporting commentator and radio presenter with station 3DB (now known as KIIS 101.1) Melbourne from the late 1940s to the late 1970s.

He started out as a panel operator at radio 3DB and overcame a speech impediment to replace Eric Welsh as 3DB's sports director. He became one of Victoria's and Australia's leading sports commentators on radio and television, especially in football, boxing and harness racing. His most famous radio broadcast was the 1968 call from Japan when Lionel Rose defeated Fighting Harada for the world boxing title.

== Television roles ==
Joining HSV-7 in 1956, he served as host of HSV-7's World of Sport program for 28 years. He became studio manager of HSV in 1969 and was general manager from 1972 until 1987, when the station was sold to the Fairfax Group.

He served on the board of the Federation of Australian Commercial Television Stations, chairing it for three terms.

== Other ==
He served many years as president and chairman of his beloved North Melbourne Football Club leading the club to two premierships. He was awarded the MBE in 1982 for his services to sport and journalism. In 1991 he was inducted into the Sport Australia Hall of Fame, and in 1996 was an inaugural inductee into the Australian Football Hall of Fame in the Media category. The Melbourne Cricket Ground's media centre is called the Ron Casey Media Centre in his honour.

Of Irish descent, Casey was a long-time member of the Celtic Club, and frequently attended major Irish-Australian events throughout his life.
