= Lady for a Day (game show) =

- Genre: Game show
- Based on: Queen for a Day by John Masterson
- Presented by: Larry K. Nixon
- Country of origin: Australia
- Original language: English

Production
- Running time: 60 minutes

Original release
- Network: HSV-7
- Release: 8 August 1960 – 8 August 1962

Lady for a Day was an Australian television game show which aired from 1960 to 1962 on Melbourne station HSV-7. Hosted by American Larry K. Nixon, the first episode aired 8 August 1960 while the final episode aired 8 August 1962. It was based on controversial US series Queen for a Day. Each episode was 60 minutes, and the series aired 5 days a week.

The National Film and Sound Archive holds a copy of the opening and closing sequences of the program, and also a compilation of Australian programs with American hosts, in which the program is featured.
