= Oxford Show =

- Genre: Variety
- Presented by: Jim Berinson
- Starring: Laurie Wilson; Hector McLennan
- Country of origin: Australia
- Original language: English

Production
- Running time: 15 minutes

Original release
- Network: HSV-7
- Release: April 1957 – 1958

Oxford Show is an Australian radio program which was broadcast on Melbourne station 3KZ in the 1950s. According to an article in the 4 April 1957 issue of The Age newspaper, It was a variety series hosted by Jim Berinson, a tenor. Also featured were Laurie Wilson, pianist-organist, and Hector McLennan, banjoist.

In April 1957, the show switched to television. At the time, it was not unusual to simulcast a radio show on television, or to record the audio of a television show for radio broadcast. In the case of Oxford Show, however, the Melbourne radio version ended when the show switched to television. Nevertheless, a recording of the audio was still made for broadcast on Sydney radio (per the same article in The Age).

The television version aired from 1957 to 1958 on station HSV-7, and ran in a 15-minute timeslot. At one point it aired on Fridays at 7:15PM, preceded by Art and the Kids (a re-titled American series starring Art Linkletter), and was followed at 8:00PM by Tales of the 77th Bengal Lancers (an American adventure series).

There is no information available as to whether any of the radio recordings still exist. It is also unknown if any kinescope recordings exist of the television version.

The series was sponsored by Oxford products, including Oxford Pine-O-Cleen.
