= Bill Collins (racecaller) =

Australian racecaller and TV pioneer

Bill Collins OAM
- Born: William Henry Collins; 23 September 1928; Trafalgar, Victoria, Australia
- Died: 14 June 1997 (aged 68); Melbourne, Victoria, Australia
- Occupations: Racecaller, radio and television personality
- Years active: 1951–1988
- Known for: Calling of the Melbourne Cup
- Awards: Australian Racing Hall of Fame

William Henry Collins OAM (23 September 1928 – 14 June 1997) was an Australian racecaller and radio and television personality who earned the reputation for being able to accurately call the winner of even the closest of races. Known as "The Accurate One", he was well known for his call of the Melbourne Cup each year. One of his most notable commentaries was the 1986 Cox Plate, dubbed the "Race of the Century". Collins also called important races internationally including the UK, US, South Africa, New Zealand, Hong Kong and Singapore. Collins died on 14 June 1997 from cancer.

== Radio and television broadcasting ==
Collins's radio career began in the early 1950s in Sale, Victoria, and in 1953 he moved to Melbourne where he worked as a racecaller for the radio station 3DB, and appeared on television hosting the musical comedy program Sunnyside Up at HSV-7, leading to a Logie Award in 1959 for Outstanding Performance. He would later host the Saturday Night "Seven's Penthouse Club" along with Mary Hardy from 1970 until 1978, an unusual series which mixed Variety entertainment with Night Trotting .

Bill called his last meeting at Caulfield in April 1988

== Order of Australia ==
In 1988, Collins received an Order of Australia Medal (OAM) for his services to the media as a broadcaster and journalist, and was also inducted into the "Australian Racing Hall of Fame". He called his last race on Easter Saturday 1988 on radio 3UZ, as 3DB had already dropped its racing coverage.

== Legacy ==
In 2004, he was honoured posthumously at the Moonee Valley Racecourse, home of the W.S. Cox Plate, with the 'Kingston Town Greatness Award' for his services to the event. Moonee Valley Racecourse also featured the Bill Collins Mile for trotters, which is now run at Cranbourne. A monument to Collins was unveiled in 2013 at Caulfield Racecourse.

== Memorable Calls ==
1954 Melbourne Cup "Here's Rising Fast going after him at every stride, Pandie Star behind them and then coming home well Commodore. Rising Fast has hit the front from Gay Helios at the furlong post, Hellion coming from the clouds on the outside, Rising Fast is too far in front however and in the run to the post Rising Fast going to win the Melbourne Cup by two lengths from Hellion!"

1965 Melbourne Cup "A furlong and a half to go and Ziema's hit the front, Light Fingers under the whip trying to run him down from Yangtze, Midlander and then Tobin Bronze and Prince Grant. It's Ziema in front, Light Fingers throwing in a desperate challenge. Ziema about a neck in front, Light Fingers pegging him back. Light Fingers goes to Ziema hit the line locked together. Dead heat! A dead heat in the Melbourne Cup!"

1979 WS Cox Plate "At the 400 Dulcify shot away two and a half lengths Imposing then Shivaree under the whip from Arbre Chene and Gyspy Kingdom. But Dulcify well clear Brent Thompson going for his fourth Cox Plate and he's got it! He's home Dulcify! He's six lengths in front of Shivaree then Arbre Chene, Imposing stopping. Dulcify's won by a minute and that's the way he might win the Melbourne Cup! Dulcify by six lengths to Shivaree."

1981 WS Cox Plate "Up by the 500, Bingbinga joined by Lawman on the rails Prince Ruling from Silver Bounty, Quinton's in trouble on Kingston Town he's trying to find somewhere to go there followed by Sovereign Red, he's not responding Kingston Town. On the turn it's Bingbinga from Lawman two lengths to Kingston Town now getting out from Silver Bounty. Kingston Town's got out he's pulled the whip on him tackling Lawman quickly, Kingston Town raced to Lawman and Silver Bounty. It's Kingston Town, Lawman, Lawman in front, Kingston Town wearing him down, he'll win! The million dollar man's won it! Kingston Town a half-length to Lawman."

1982 WS Cox Plate "On the turn 500 out Fearless Pride and My Axeman a length and a half Lawman, Kingston Town can't win! Then Allez Bijou and the three-year old Grosvenor running on. My Axeman took the lead from Fearless Pride, Grosvenor coming down the outside is after them. My Axeman in front, Grosvenor and Kingston Town flashing he might win yet the champ! Grosvenor grabbed the lead oh, Kingston Town swapping them! What a run! Kingston Town wins it a neck to Grosvenor."

1986 WS Cox Plate "Here come the New Zealanders Our Waverley Star and Bonecrusher they've raced to the lead 600 out have they gone too early? Two lengths to Drought running up to third from Society Bay they were followed then by Drawn at the head of the others Dinky Flyer. But Our Waverley Star he got a half-length to Bonecrusher he's gone for the whip on Bonecrusher, three lengths to Drought followed then by Dinky Flyer and Drawn. But the two great New Zealanders have come away on the turn, Our Waverley Star a half-length Bonecrusher the big red won't give in Drought running on, Bonecrusher responds to the whip, the roars of the crowd! He races up to Our Waverley Star a hundred out Bonecrusher, Our Waverley Star stride for stride nothing in it, Our Waverley Star the rails Bonecrusher the outside and Bonecrusher races into equine immortality!"

1987 Australian Cup "At Talaq's taken the lead at the 300 shot a length in front of Sir Lustrious. Bonecrusher, Stewart's gone for the whip and he makes his run on the outside but At Talaq's got two lengths on him! Bonecrusher's gonna be everything we thought to get near At Talaq! At Talaq a length and half in front, Bonecrusher trying hard he's gradually making ground. Bonecrusher coming at At Talaq will the champ get up? He lunges, yes! Oh, it might be a dead heat, Bonecrusher or a dead heat with At Talaq."

1988 Australian Cup "Oh, he's got this won I'd say, at the distance Vo Rogue by six lengths, Dandy Andy second then Bonecrusher and Bahrain, it's Dandy Andy racing after Vo Rogue can it be a boilover? Vo Rogue stopping, Dandy Andy's got him, Dandy Andy, goodness gracious me! Dandy Andy a length to Vo Rouge."

== Hobbies ==
Collins was a philatelist who amassed an excellent collection of the stamps of the Australian colonies, that is 1850 to 1913, when the Federal Government issued its first stamps.

== References and resources ==
- Inductees, Champions: Australian Racing Museum and Hall of Fame
- Horse Racing Personalities, Horse Racing Magazine
- Collins family history
