= HSV (TV station) =

- Melbourne, Victoria; Australia
- Channels: Digital: 6 (VHF); Virtual: 7
- Branding: Seven

Programming
- Language: English
- Network: Seven

Ownership
- Owner: Seven Media Group; (Channel Seven Melbourne Pty Ltd)

History
- First air date: 4 November 1956
- Former channel number: Analog: 7 (VHF) (1956–2013)
- Former affiliations: Australian Television Network (1956–1963)
- Call sign meaning: Herald/Sun Victoria

Technical information
- Licensing authority: Australian Communications & Media Authority
- ERP: 50 kW
- HAAT: 555 m
- Transmitter coordinates: 37°50′8″S 145°20′52″E

Links
- Website: 7plus.com.au/seven-news-melbourne

HSV is a television station in Melbourne, Australia. It is part of the Seven Network, one of the three main commercial television networks in Australia, its first and oldest station. It launched in time for the 1956 Summer Olympic Games in Melbourne. HSV-7 is the home of AFL coverage.

The HSV building (also known as 'Broadcast Centre Melbourne') was the network's operations hub, where the Master Control Room was located, controlling all metropolitan and regional feeds. Its headquarters was next to Etihad Stadium (now Marvel Stadium) they now have . Programming lineup, advertisement output, feed switching, time zone monitoring and national transmission output was previously delivered there. All Seven Network owned and operated studios had their live signals relayed there: for instance, ATN's output was fed to HSV and then transmitted via satellite or fibre optics to towers around metropolitan Sydney. In 2019 this function was transferred to a new centre in Sydney as part of a joint venture with Nine Network. As with other Melbourne terrestrial stations, its original transmission tower was atop Mount Dandenong. In 2025, HSV moved all their operations to Melbourne Quarter Tower in Collins Street.

== History ==
HSV-7 began test transmissions in July 1956, becoming the first 7 station in Australia and the first television station in Melbourne. It began broadcasting on 4 November, soon after the Commonwealth Government started issuing television licences. In the opening ceremony, Eric Pearce declared :

"We dedicate this station to the full service of the community. To Australian life – the happy families in the homes – we promise to serve you faithfully and well".

HSV-7 and rival station GTV-9 were formed in time to broadcast the Melbourne Olympics, while Sydney stations TCN-9 and ATN-7 in Sydney relayed the Melbourne coverage. HSV-7 was originally owned by the Herald & Weekly Times, owners of The Herald and The Sun (now merged as the Herald Sun). These two newspapers gave rise to the call sign HSV (the 'V' stands for Victoria, as is the normal protocol for television call signs to have the third letter indicate the state where the station is licensed, although for publicity purposes HSV was said to stand for Herald Sun Vision just as sister station ATN became the Australian Television Network rather than New South Wales). In March 1960, the station converted an old cinema in Fitzroy into the Southern Hemisphere's first fully remote studio, equipped with RCA TRT video tape recorders, camera cranes and AV mixing equipment. It featured a larger stage and backstage rooms, and audience capacity for up to 600. It was called the Channel 7 Teletheatre and connected to the station's main Dorcas Street studios in South Melbourne by multiple microwave links. The teletheatre opened with a major live show featuring the US entertainer Bob Crosby and his band and the British comedian Jimmy Edwards, among others. Many popular children's shows and variety programs (e.g. Sunnyside Up and The Happy Show) originated there in front of live audiences.

This station commissioned many of Australian TV's earliest and longest-running courtroom and police procedural dramatic series such as Crawford's Consider Your Verdict and Homicide.

One of the longest-serving station and general managers during the transformative years into international satellite links and color transmissions was Ron Casey. By the late 1960s, Channel 7 was demonstrating PAL color TV to crowds visiting the annual Royal Melbourne Show.

The station began to identify as Channel Seven in the late 1960s, and in the early 1970s used the national Seven Network logos. It followed the network's on-air presentation and programming. In 1979, John Fairfax & Sons bought a substantial share of HSV-7 after many failed bids for the entire station. In December 1986, the station was purchased by News Limited. In February 1987 HSV-7 was sold back to Fairfax, along with Brisbane station BTQ-7. As a result of the payback, HSV's unique faces – World of Sport, Mal Walden and its Hello Melbourne campaign, Australia's contribution to Frank Gari's Hello News campaigns were all ended. By 1987 its rights to Australian rules football telecasts were taken by ABC's state station ABV-2. Walden later moved to Ten (ATV-10) as a result of this.

In 1987, the government introduced cross-media ownership laws which forced Fairfax to choose between its print and broadcast operations. It chose print, and HSV-7 was sold to Christopher Skase's Qintex, which already owned Seven stations in Sydney, Adelaide and Perth. Skase pledged to revitalize the channel and its programs, and to return it to its prior success among Melbourne viewers. In 1990, Qintex was sent into damage control after Skase escaped extradition proceedings, and the Seven Network became a discrete company. Entrepreneur Kerry Stokes bought the network in 1995. On 10 December 2013, HSV-7 terminated its analogue signal as part of the switchover to digital transmission. At around 8:54am local time, HSV-7's analogue signal broke away from Sunrise to air a montage of the history of its analogue broadcasts from all the way back in the 50s and 60s. The signal was then cut off after the montage.

== Headquarters ==
Broadcast Centre Melbourne, was the centre of programming operations for the entire Seven Network up until 2019 and formerly the headquarters for HSV

HSV's production studios and headquarters were originally located at the Dorcas Street Studios in South Melbourne. HSV remained there until 10 March 2002 when news, current affairs and sport shows were moved to new headquarters at Docklands and the Dorcas Street Studios were closed. Docklands Studios Melbourne and Global Television is home to HSV's studio facilities for the Seven Network's Melbourne-based entertainment, drama and reality programmes shows such as Dancing with the Stars (Australian TV series) and the quiz show The Chase Australia.

HSV's headquarters, known on-air as Broadcast Centre Melbourne or BCM, are located near the Docklands Stadium in Docklands. On 11 March 2002, the first Seven News Melbourne bulletin, presented by Peter Mitchell, was first broadcast from the new HSV building. The centre consists of three studios: a theatre studio, a production studio and a news studio that opens onto the newsroom. The building is used as the transmission control centre for Seven's owned-and-operated stations in Melbourne, Sydney, Brisbane, Adelaide, Perth and regional areas of Queensland. Approximately 200 full-time employees work in the building with an additional 100 part-timers. In 2005, the HSV building experienced a power failure that resulted in a blackout across the Seven Network, as well as all regional affiliates.

The HSV studios produces Seven News Melbourne and was the main play-out centre for sports broadcasting. While broadcasting on air, national news programs often refer to HSV as 'News Centre', while 'Sports Central' (or 'Footy Central' for AFL broadcasts) is commonly used for sports programs.

2019 saw the Seven Network move its main play-out centre to NPC Media in Sydney.

After more than two decades at Docklands, HSV moved its headquarters and operations to Collins Street, Melbourne. The HSV building at Docklands closed on 11 May 2025 with HSV's staff to move into a newly constructed office tower located within the "Melbourne Quarter" development.

After 24 years, the Seven News Melbourne bulletin concluded broadcast from the Broadcast Centre Melbourne on 11 May 2025 before moving to the Melbourne Quarter Tower, located on Collins Street starting from 12 May 2025.

== Programming ==
Locally produced programs by or with HSV-7 Melbourne:

=== HSV Studios ===
- Seven News Melbourne (1956–present)
- Seven Afternoon News Melbourne (2015–present)
- Seven News With Alex Cullen (2025–present)
- Sunday Footy Feast (2025–present)
- The Wash Up (2025–present)
- NFL Coverage (2025–present)

=== Location ===
- The Agenda Setters (2025–present)
- Healthy, Wealthy and Wise (2025–present)
- House of Wellness (2017–present)
- The Front Bar (2016–present)
- Better Homes and Gardens (1995–present)
- Melbourne Weekender (2005) (2015–16) (2024–present)
- Highway Patrol (2007–present)
- Border Security (2004–present)
- Good Friday Appeal (1957–present)

Seven Melbourne is also the official broadcaster for these major events in Melbourne.

- Saturday Afternoon Horse Racing (2013–present)
- Australian Test Cricket (2018–present)
- Women's Big Bash League (2018–present)
- Big Bash League (2018–present)
- Australian Football League (1957–2001, 2007–present) excluding 1987

== Past programming ==
=== News and current affairs ===
- Today Tonight (HSV-7 1995–2006) (ATN-7 2006–2012) (HSV-7 2013)
- Seven 4.30 News (HSV-7 2003–2006) production moved to ATN-7
- Seven Afternoon News (2013) production moved to ATN-7
- Seven News at Five (1996)
- Hinch (1987–1991)
- Newsworld (1982–1988) Local Late night news bulletin
- Meet The Press (1958–1967)
- Sunrise Weather (2008)

=== Entertainment ===
- Moomba Street Parade (2010–2020)
- Melbourne New Year's Eve Fireworks (2011–2020)
- The Great Weekend (2019–2020)
- Kinne (2014–2017)
- A Moveable Feast (2017–2018)
- Behave Yourself! (2017–2020) – ABC Studios Elsternwick
- The Big Music Quiz (2016)
- Powerball (Australia) (1996–2016)
- Oz Lotto (1995–2016)
- Dancing with the Stars (2004–2015)
- Million Dollar Minute (2013–2015)
- Slide Show (2013)
- Pictures of You (TV series) (2012)
- Spit It Out (TV series) (2010–2011)
- Iron Chef Australia (2010)
- Medical Emergency (2004–2009)
- Double Take (2009)
- Beat the Star (Australia) (2010)
- Thank God You're Here (2009)
- The Rich List (2007–2009)
- Battle of the Choirs (2008)
- Kath & Kim (2007)
- Australia's Got Talent (2007–2012)
- It Takes Two (2006–2008)
- Where Are They Now? (2006–2008)
- Great Comedy Classics (2006–2007)
- The Master (2006)
- The Support Unit 2005 (2005)
- Made in Melbourne Specials (2005, commemorating station's 50th anniversary)
- Let Loose Live (2005)
- Coxy's Big Break (2004–2015)
- Hamish and Andy (2004)
- Deal or No Deal (2003–2013)
- Big Bite (2003) (parts)
- Greeks on the Roof (2003)
- The Weakest Link (2001–2002)
- The Mole (2000–2005)
- Something Stupid (1998)
- Eric (1997)
- Big Girl's Blouse (1994)
- Man O Man (1994)
- Jimeoin (1994–1995)
- Full Frontal (1993–1997) (parts)
- Bligh (1992)
- Tonight Live With Steve Vizard (1990–1993)
- Fast Forward (1989–1992) (parts)
- Acropolis Now (1989–1992)
- The D-Generation (1988–1989)
- The Eleventh Hour (1985)
- The New Price Is Right (1981–1986)
- Shirl's Neighbourhood (1979–1983)
- Two on the Aisle (1971–1974) with Ivan Hutchinson and Jim Murphy
- The Penthouse Club (1970–1979)
- It's Academic (1970–1978)
- TV Ringside (1966–1975)
- SSB Club (1960s)
- Video Village (1960s) with Danny Webb and Liz Harris
- Fighting Words (1960s)
- Review with Geoff Raymond (1960s)
- Romper Room (1963–1988)
- Time For Terry (1965)
- Variety 7 (1963–1964)
- Auditions (1962)
- Buy Word (1962)
- Make a Wish (1962–1964)
- Make Mine Music (1962)
- What's the Meaning? (1962)
- Hold Everything (1961)
- Merry-Go-Round (1961)
- Lady for a Day (1960–1962)
- The Happy Show (1960–1969) with Happy Hammond
- Saturday Showcase (1960)
- Tea for Two (1960)
- Western Holiday (1960)
- Pick a Pint (1960)
- Bandwagon (1959–1960)
- Brenda's Time (1960)
- Club Seven (1959–1961)
- Don't Argue (1959)
- Let's Make Clothes (1959)
- What's On (1959)
- At Your Request (1958–1959)
- Brian and the Juniors (1958–1970) with Brian Naylor
- Cool Cats Show (1958–1960)
- Movie Guide (1958–1959)
- Personal Column (1958–1959)
- Tuesday Home Show (1958–1959)
- Be My Guest (1957)
- Blues, Studio One (1957)
- Zig & Zag (1957–1969)
- Handyman (1957–1958)
- Beauty is My Business (1957–1958)
- Let's Dance (1957)
- Oxford Show (1957–1958)
- Peters Fun Fair
- Sunnyside Up (1957–1964/1966)
- Swallows Parade (1957)
- Take That (1957–1959)
- Teenage Mailbag (1957–1958) with Ernie Sigley
- Tivoli Party Time (1957)
- The Late Show (1957–1959) with Noel Ferrier and Bert Newton
- Fun with Charades (1956–1958)
- I've Got a Secret (1956–1958)
- The Isador Goodman Show (1956–1957)
- The Judy Jack Show (1956–1957)
- Guest of the Week (1956–1957)
- Sports Talk (1956–1959)
- Stairway to the Stars (1956–1958)
- Eric and Mary (1956)

==== Drama ====
- Ms Fisher's Modern Murder Mysteries (2019)
- The Doctor Blake Mysteries (2013–2017 on ABC, 2018 on Seven)
- Winners & Losers (2011–2016)
- City Homicide (2007–2011)
- Blue Heelers (1994–2006)
- Marshall Law (2002)
- Last Man Standing (2005)
- Skirts (1990)
- The Power, The Passion (1989)
- All the Rivers Run (1983, 1990)
- Sons And Daughters (1982–1987)
- Neighbours (1985) moved to Network 10 from 1986 and axed in 2022. Revived by Amazon in 2023.
- Skyways (1979–1981)
- Cop Shop (1977–1983)
- Solo One (1976)
- Ryan (1972–1974)
- Bluey (1976–1977)
- Homicide (1964–1975)
- Consider Your Verdict (1961–1964)

==== Sport ====
- Victorian Football League (2015–2025)
- Talking Footy (1994–2002, 2013–2020, 2024)
- AFL Game Day (2008–2020)
- Footy Flashbacks (2010–2017)
- Melbourne Spring Racing Carnival Horse Racing (2002–2018)
- The Emirates Melbourne Cup Carnival Horse Racing (2002–2018)
- V8 Supercars Sandown 500 Motor Racing (1985–1996) (2007–2014)
- Santo, Sam and Ed's Sports Fever! (2012)
- Rex Hunt's Footy Panel (1997–2003)
- Sportsworld (1987–2003, production moved to Sydney)
- World of Sport (1959–1987)
- Live and Kicking (1998–1999)
- The Game (2000–2001)
- Seven's Big League (AFL Football) (1978–1986)
- Football Inquest (1960–1974)
- The Footy Show (1957–1958)
- John Coleman on Football (1957)

== Seven News ==
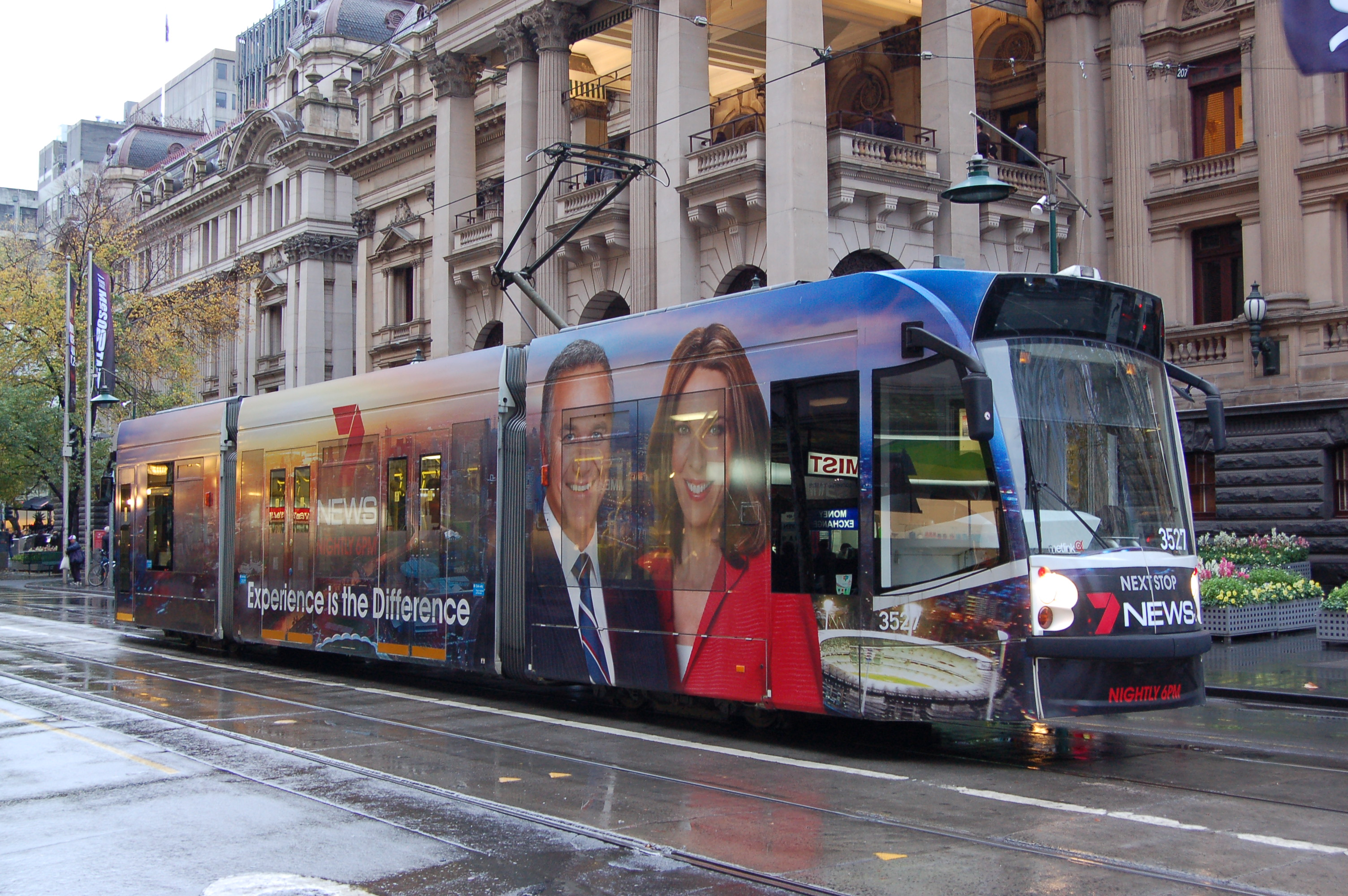
A tram in Seven News Melbourne wrap livery outside Melbourne Town Hall.

Wideshot of Melbourne's news studio, with Peter Mitchell presenting.

Seven News Melbourne is directed by Chris Salter and presented by Peter Mitchell from Monday to Thursday and Karina Carvalho from Friday to Sunday from Melbourne Quarter Tower, located at Collins Street, Docklands. Sport is presented by Rebecca Maddern on weeknights and Theo Doropoulos on weekends. Weather is presented by certified meteorologist Jane Bunn on weeknights and Tyra Stowers on weekends.

Peter Mitchell previously held the role of weekend presenter for then-titled Seven Nightly News between 1987 and 2000 when he replaced the short-lived presenting duo of David Johnston and Anne Fulwood. Jennifer Keyte was appointed as main weeknight presenter in 1990, becoming Australia's first solo female primetime commercial news presenter. In a network reshuffle in 1996, Keyte terminated her employment after the Seven Network attempted to pair her with David Johnston, who went on to present solo for three years. She returned in 2003, assuming the role as weekend presenter, succeeding Jennifer Adams.

In May 2018, Network Ten announced that Keyte would leave Seven Network to present Ten Eyewitness News Melbourne replacing Stephen Quartermain. In August 2018, it was announced that Mike Amor would move back to Australia after 17 years as United States Bureau Chief to replace Keyte as weekend presenter.

Following decades of trailing Nine News Melbourne, 10 News First Melbourne (previously Ten Eyewitness News, Ten News at Five, Ten Evening News and Ten News: First at Five) and ABC News Victoria in the ratings, Seven News Melbourne won the ratings battle from February 2005. As of 2007, Seven News held the number one position. This was followed by a series of advertisements and promos which touted Seven News Melbourne as Melbourne's New #1 and Nine altering their promotions to simply say Melbourne's Best News – a throwback to the 1980s when National Nine News Melbourne was beaten in the ratings by ATV-10's Ten Eyewitness News. But, it was replaced in 2009 when Nine News returned to win the Melbourne news ratings battle.

Between 2018 and 2021, during the AFL season, Peter Mitchell, Tim Watson, Jane Bunn and the weeknight team would present from Sunday to Thursday and Mike Amor, Jacqueline Felgate, Melina Sarris and the weekend team would present on Friday and Saturday nights.

In January 2022, it was announced that Rebecca Maddern would return to the Seven Network to present 7NEWS Melbourne on weekends with Mike Amor.

In November 2024, Tim Watson announced that he would be retiring after 30 years with the network from December. It was announced that Rebecca Maddern will step into an expanded role with Seven News Melbourne starting January 2025, as Chief Sports Presenter. In January 2025, it was announced that Karina Carvalho will replace Maddern to present on weekends with Mike Amor.

In October 2026, it was announced that Mike Amor would be leaving Seven News Melbourne after three decades with the network. Following his departure, Karina Carvalho will continue to present weekends solo.

Afternoon news updates for Melbourne are presented by Carvalho or Turner, while Mitchell presents weeknight updates. Carvalho presents weekend news updates. Karina Carvalho, Laura Turner and Blake Johnson are the fill-in news presenters, with Theo Doropoulos and Kate Massey are the fill-in sport presenters and Melina Sarris, Tyra Stowers and Blake Johnson are the fill-in weather presenters.

In August 2015, Seven News Melbourne began producing a local Seven Afternoon News bulletin replacing the national bulletin. Amor and Carvalho present the bulletin on alternate days. In 2020, owing to the COVID-19 pandemic, that bulletin temporary included news items from South Australia following the cancellation of the statewide afternoon bulletin from SAS-7 in Adelaide before the network reinstated it due to viewer opposition and the threat faced by the local Nine News team on Seven's news dominance.

=== Presenters ===
Current presenters
Role	Bulletins						
Role	Monday	Tuesday	Wednesday	Thursday	Friday	Saturday	Sunday
News	Peter Mitchell (2000–present)				Karina Carvalho (2025–present)		
Sport	Rebecca Maddern (2025–present)					Theo Doropoulos (2025–present)	
Weather	Jane Bunn (2014–present)					Tyra Stowers (2025–present)	

=== Reporters ===
- Blake Johnson (Senior Reporter/Fill-in News and Weather Presenter)
- Nick McCallum (Senior Reporter)
- Paul Dowsley (Senior Reporter)
- Jackie Quist (Senior Reporter)
- Kristy Mayr (Senior Reporter)
- Hope Wilson (Senior Reporter)
- Rochelle Brown (Senior Reporter)
- Kathleen O’Connor (Senior Reporter)
- Melina Sarris (Senior Reporter and Weather Presenter)
- Laura Turner (Senior Reporter/Fill-in News Presenter)
- Tyra Stowers (Senior Reporter and Weather Presenter)
- Jordy Wright (Senior Reporter)
- Sara Jones (Senior Reporter)
- Ainsley Koch (Senior Reporter)
- Sheri Smith (Senior Reporter)
- Jordan Quinn (Senior Reporter)

=== Sport Reporters ===
- Mitch Cleary (Chief AFL Reporter)
- Theo Doropoulos (Senior AFL Reporter and Sport Presenter)
- Xander McGuire (Sport Reporter)

=== Sunrise & The Morning Show Correspondent ===
- Teegan Dolling (Sunrise Correspondent)
- Andrew McCormack (Sunrise Correspondent)

=== Canberra Bureau ===
- Mark Riley (Canberra Political Bureau Chief)
- Tim Lester (Canberra Political Reporter)

=== Overseas Bureaus ===
- Mylee Hogan (US Correspondent)
- Rob Scott (US Correspondent)
- Ben Downie (Europe Correspondent)
- Isabelle Mullen (Europe Correspondent)

=== Past Presenters ===
- Eric Pearce (1956–1957) – Weeknight Presenter
- Mary Parker (1956–unknown)
- Dan Webb (1956–unknown)
- Brian Naylor (1964–1978) – Weeknight Presenter
- Mal Walden (1979–1987) – Weeknight Presenter
- Greg Pearce (1987) – Weeknight Presenter
- David Johnston (Late 1960s; 1996–2005) – Weeknight Presenter & Seven 4.30 News Presenter
- Anne Fulwood (1999–2000) – Weeknight Presenter
- Sandy Roberts (1983–2013) – Sport Presenter
- Ivan Hutchinson (1964–1994) – Music Director & Presenter
- Nicole Chvastek (1996–2002) – Presenter & Reporter
- Jennifer Adams (1999–2003) – Weekend News Presenter
- Rob Gell (2004–2008) – Weekend Weather Presenter
- David Brown (1995–2012; 2015) – Weather Presenter
- Jill Singer (1995–1997) – Today Tonight Presenter
- Naomi Robson (1997–2006) – Today Tonight Presenter
- Helen Kapalos (2013) – Today Tonight Presenter
- Jennifer Keyte (2003–2018) – Weekend News Presenter
- Jacqueline Felgate (2012–2022) – Weekend Sport & Afternoon News Presenter
- Sean Sowerby (2012–2021) – Weekend Sport Presenter
- Sonia Marinelli (2020–2025) – Weekend Weather Presenter & Reporter
- Abbey Gelmi (2022–2024) – Weekend Sport Presenter
- Mike Amor (2018–2026) – Weekend & Afternoon News Presenter

=== Past Reporters ===
- Greg Shackleton (mid 1970s)
- Dean Felton
- Heath O'Loughlin (2000–2006)
- Dylan Howard (2005–2008)
- Leith Mulligan (2008–2012)
- Amy Parks (2009–2013)
- Michael Felgate (2004–2012 & 2014–2019)
- Brendan Donohoe (1990–2020)
- Jade Robran
- Karen O'Sullivan (2004–2018)
- Michael Scanlan (2012–2018)
- Peter Beaton (1987–1995)
- Laurel Irving (2008–2021)
- Nathan Templeton (2012–2022)
- Mark Stevens (2013–2021)
- Alan Murrell
- Tom Browne
- Cameron Baud (2010–2024)
- Sharnelle Vella (2017–2024)

== See also ==
- Television broadcasting in Australia
