= Baskett =

Baskett is a surname that may refer to:

- Ann Baskett (1928–2020), English actress, critic, and painter
- Bruce Baskett, Australian journalist
- Forest Baskett (born 1943), American computer scientist, venture capitalist and academic
- Hank Baskett (born 1982), American football player
- James Baskett (1904–1948), American actor; portrayed Uncle Remus in the Disney film Song of the South
- James Newton Baskett (1849–1925), American naturalist and writer
- John Baskett (1664/5–1742), English printer
- Kieran Baskett (born 2001), Canadian soccer player
- Kendra Baskett (a.k.a. Kendra Wilkinson) (born 1985), American glamour model and television personality
- Peter Baskett (1934–2008), British physician and health system reformer

== Other uses ==
- Baskett, Kentucky

== See also ==
- Baskette (surname)
- Basket (disambiguation)
