= Mass media in Australia =

Adults employed in the information media and telecommunications industries as a percentage of the adult population in Australia divided geographically by statistical local area, as of the 2011 census

Mass media in Australia spans traditional and digital formats, and caters mostly to its predominantly English-speaking population. It is delivered in a variety of formats including radio, television, newspaper, internet and IPTV. Varieties include local, regional, state, federal and international sources of media, reporting on Australian news, opinion, policy, issues and culture.

Australia has two public broadcasters: the Australian Broadcasting Corporation (ABC), which has an extensive reach across television and radio, and is entirely funded by tax revenue; and the Special Broadcasting Service (SBS), which has a remit to provide multilingual programming, and is partially funded by taxes.

Australia has been on a decline on the Press Freedom Index, in reflection of rising media censorship and intimidation of journalists in the country, including media companies maintaining close ties to political leaders, fueling doubts about editorial independence. Two giant firms dominate mass media in Australia – Nine Entertainment and News Corp Australia, a subsidiary of American-based News Corp. The country was ranked 19th out of 180 countries in 2018, before subsequently dropping to 26th out of 180 countries for 2020 and 39th in 2022.

== Television ==
=== Free-to-air TV ===
New South Wales and Victoria were introduced to television in 1956, with the other states and territories following suit up to 1971 (the Northern Territory). Colour television was introduced in 1975.

In addition to the public broadcasters which are available to almost all of Australia's population, there are three major commercial television networks: the Seven Network, the Nine Network and Network 10. Most of Australia's heavily populated cities are serviced by all three networks. Some rural or regional areas may receive a more limited selection, often with some of the channels available showing programming from more than one of the major networks. An example of such a "shared" regional network is Imparja.

Digital free-to-air broadcasts commenced on 1 January 2001. Analogue broadcasts were originally intended to be phased out by 2008, however analogue phaseout was not achieved until 2013.

After heated debate in the early 2000s over a Bill that would have removed the foreign ownership restrictions of broadcasting TV licences, the Keating government chose to retain the foreign-ownership restrictions in its 1992 Broadcasting Act. The Howard government was set to remove this law sometime in 2007, having gained parliamentary approval to change the legislation in 2006.

In 2007, with Helen Coonan as communications minister, there were two significant changes. Foreign ownership limits were scrapped, government changed the cross-media ownership rules to allow ownership of two out of three media types.

=== Pay TV and streaming services ===
Approximately 25% of Australian households had access to pay television services by the end of 2005. The main provider is Foxtel in both metropolitan, regional and rural areas offering nearly all Australian channels via cable & satellite TV in capital cities, and mostly the same channels are offered by Foxtel via satellite TV (predominantly) in regional areas with the recent merger with Austar in 2012.

In mid-2016 the number of Australians with access to some form of pay television outstripped those with without. At the end of 2019 14.5 million Australians had access to some form of Pay TV or Subscription TV, with the combined audience of these platforms equalling almost 70% of the population. Netflix remains the market leader, although Foxtel and Stan have gained continual growth since entering the market.

There are several smaller competitors offer a subset of channels – with Fetch TV entering the market in 2010 with a subscription service over a few ADSL2+ networks, and TransACT offering TV via its own VDSL, VDSL2 and FTTP/FTTH networks in Canberra and its Neighbourhood Cable network in parts of Victoria. Other providers of Internet television in Australia offer free content or PPV, but don't offer a subscription product. UBI World TV offers a number of ethnic satellite TV and Radio channels nationwide, and other small companies offer some channels via satellite, especially foreign services or free-to-air channels, and some channels are available over the Internet.

==== Netflix ====
Netflix was released in Australia and New Zealand 24 March 2015. As of February 2019, 11.2 million Australians had a Netflix subscription in their household, up 25% on a year before that.

Netflix has been criticised for not "telling" Australian stories by former ABC managing director Mark Scott. Research has found that Australian film and television made up less than 2% of Netflix's Australian catalogue in 2018. In 2020, the Australian Competition & Consumer Commission floated a proposal to subject Netflix to local content requirements. However, this proposal was ultimately rejected by the government.

==== Stan ====
Stan (stylised as Stan.) is an Australian subscription video on-demand over-the-top streaming television service. It was launched on 26 January 2015. Stan originally was founded as StreamCo Media, a 50/50 joint venture between Nine Entertainment and Fairfax Media. In August 2014, each company invested A$50 million in StreamCo. StreamCo was renamed Stan Entertainment in December 2014, prior to the January 2015 launch of the streaming service. Nine Entertainment acquired Fairfax Media in 2018, making Stan a wholly owned subsidiary of Nine Digital.

The service offers a broad range of film and television content from both local and foreign productions, particularly from the United States and United Kingdom. Stan also includes a growing library of their own original film and television content. With over 2.6 million subscribers, as of June 2023 Stan is the fourth largest streaming service in Australia, behind Disney+, Amazon Prime Video and Netflix.

== Newspapers and news websites ==
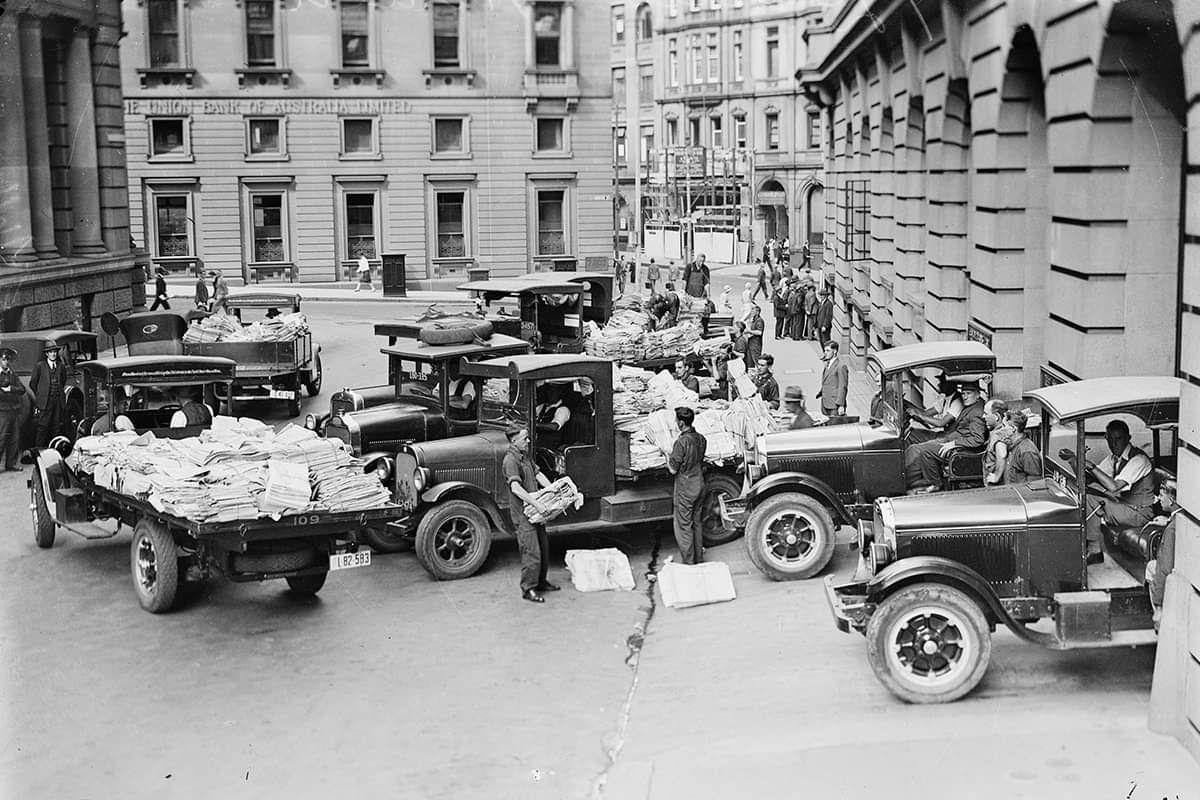
Newspapers being loaded onto trucks outside the Sydney Morning Herald office, O’Connell Street, Sydney, 1920

There are two national and 10 state/territory daily newspapers, 35 regional dailies and 470 other regional and suburban newspapers in Australia. Each state and territory has one or two dominant daily newspapers which focus upon the major national news while also containing news of importance for the state that it is sold in. These include: the Sydney Morning Herald, Daily Telegraph (Sydney), The Age , Herald Sun (Melbourne) and Canberra Times. The two national daily newspapers are The Australian and the Australian Financial Review, which are owned by different companies. Nearly all major metropolitan newspapers are owned either by News Corp Australia, or Nine Entertainment, with notable exceptions including The West Australian and The Sunday Times in Perth, and The Canberra Times in the nation's capital city.

Other notable newspapers and news websites are: news.com.au, ABC News Online, Seven News Online, SBS News Online, Nine News, the Guardian Australia, The New Daily and The Saturday Paper. Increasingly, news material is published online in Australia, sometimes exclusively.

== Radio ==
Australia's first regular radio broadcasts began on 23 November 1923 with station 2SB (later to become 2BL) in Sydney. The ABC began broadcasting in 1932. Talkback radio was first broadcast with 2UE in Sydney, just after midnight on 17 April 1967. ABC began experimenting with FM stations in the 1960s, but it wasn't until July 1980 that the first FM station commenced full operations. Melbourne-based 3EON (now known as Triple M) was the first to air.

In 2009, there were 274 operational commercial stations (funded by advertising) and 341 community (publicly funded) radio stations.

National news radio broadcasters include the Australian Broadcasting Corporation which operates 4 national radio news networks (including ABC NewsRadio and Radio National), 53 local news stations through ABC Local Radio and several digital radio stations; and the Special Broadcasting Service which also delivers multilingual Australian-produced news content.

== Regulation ==
Regulation of the media is principally assured by the federal government through its power to make laws governing telecommunications. The Australian states and territories also have important roles in this area, notably in the area of defamation law, although their laws may not conflict with a valid federal law.

The Australian Communications & Media Authority (ACMA) is the broadcasting regulator for radio and television in Australia, and also the co-regulatory Online Content Scheme. Consumers who have complaints about programs on television and radio or certain types of content on the Internet can apply to the ACMA. The Commercial Television Code of Practice is a set of regulatory guidelines, registered with the ACMA, with which commercial television broadcasters should comply.

The Australian Press Council is the self-regulatory body of the print media. The Council deals with complaints from the public about editorial material in newspapers and magazines published in Australia, and aims to maintain the freedom of the press.

=== Media ownership ===
Controls over media ownership in Australia are laid down in the Broadcasting Services Act 1992, administered by the ACMA. Even with laws in place Australia has a high concentration of media ownership compared to other western countries. Ownership of national and the newspapers of each capital city are dominated by two corporations, News Corp Australia, (which was founded in Adelaide but is now based from the United States) and Nine Entertainment – News Corp-owned titles account for nearly two-thirds (64.2 per cent) of metropolitan circulation and Nine-owned papers account for a further quarter (26.4 per cent).

The Australian Associated Press (AAP) is owned by a not-for-profit organisation. The AAP distributes the news and then sells it on to other outlets such as the Australian Broadcasting Corporation. Although much of the everyday mainstream news is drawn from the AAP, all the privately owned media outlets still compete with each other for exclusive pop culture news.

Rural and regional media is dominated by Australian Community Media, with significant holdings in all states and territories. Rural Press received a takeover offer from Fairfax Media in late 2006, and completed the merger on 8 May 2007.

There are rules governing foreign ownership of Australian media and these rules were loosened by Helen Coonan under the Howard Government via Act No. 129 of 2006 which allowed for changes to the cross-media and foreign ownership laws with the Broadcasting Services Amendment (Media Ownership) Bill 2006 . These changes came into effect in 2007 and are still in Force. The changes relaxed restrictions against cross-media ownership & control by a single company.

According to Reporters Without Borders in 2006, Australia was in 35th position on a list of countries ranked by Press Freedom; well behind New Zealand (19th) and United Kingdom (27th) (but well ahead of the US, ranked 53rd). This ranking was primarily due to the restrictions imposed by the recent anti-terrorism laws. The problem, and the concentration of media ownership, was one of many mentioned on the television show Media Watch, broadcast on the government funded ABC. As of 2018 these rankings have changed with Australia moving up to 19th, New Zealand moving up to 8th and the United Kingdom falling to 40th.

=== News Media Bargaining Code ===
The News Media Bargaining Code (NMBC, or News Media and Digital Platforms Mandatory Bargaining Code) is a law designed to have large technology platforms that operate in Australia pay local news publishers for the news content made available or linked on their platforms. The law's definition of news is broad, including "content that reports, investigates or explains ... current issues or events of public significance for Australians at a local, regional or national level." Originating in April 2020, when the Australian Government asked the Australian Competition & Consumer Commission (ACCC) to begin drafting it, it achieved broad support in the Australian Parliament but staunch opposition from Facebook and Google.

- the news providers can directly negotiate agreements with the platforms;
- if negotiations are unsuccessful, the Treasurer of Australia can "designate" the platform, imposing mandatory fees.

=== Media freedom ===
On 4 June 2019 the Australian Federal Police conducted a raid on the home of News Corp Australia journalist Annika Smethurst's home, looking for information connected to a story she had written a year earlier about new laws that would give the security forces new powers for surveillance over Australian citizens. Radio host Ben Fordham also said he was under investigation for some of his reporting.

The next day, the AFP raided the ABC over a story about alleged war crimes in Afghanistan. The search warrant allowed the police to "add, copy, delete or alter" any files they found on the computers.

The incidents caused an outcry of condemnation, even from the Reporters Without Borders, BBC and the New York Times.

In Australia itself, newspaper outlets normally driven by partisanship and advertising exhibited a surprisingly united show of protest on 21 October as they published front pages with the appearance of documents having been blacked out by government censors. The protest demanded journalists gain access to sensitive government material. Most of the larger media outlets formed a coalition, Right To Know, to represent the protest and demand six changes in legislation. The demands are, for the ability to contest any search warrant of a journalist or news entity while the search warrant is under request, reform of whistleblower protection, new limitations on which documents may be classified as secret, changes in freedom of information, exemption from national security laws enacted over the previous seven years, and reforms of defamation laws.

== See also ==
- Canberra Press Gallery
- Censorship in Australia
- Journalism in Australia
- Australian media personalities (Category)
- Australian Commercial Television Code of Practice
- Convergence Review

== Sources ==
- The Department of Foreign Affairs and Trade, Media in Australia
- Kim Jackson, Parliament of Australia – Parliamentary Library, Media Ownership Regulation in Australia, 2003
