= Basket (disambiguation) =

A basket is a wicker container used for transporting many things from small animals to food products.

Basket or baskets may also refer to:

- Baskets, the two back seats facing one another on the outside of a stagecoach
- Basket (finance), an economic term for a collection of securities aggregated into a single product to allow for simultaneous trading
- Baskets (TV series), an American television series on FX
- Market basket, an economic term for a collection of goods for tracking their price
- Basket Dome, a mountain in California
- Breadbasket, a region of country which produces an agricultural surplus which is considered vital for the country as a whole
- Three baskets, the Pali canon of Buddhist texts
- Tokri (The Basket), a 2017 Indian short animated film by Suresh Eriyat

== Sport ==
- Basket (basketball), basketball goal structure
- Basket (disc golf), most common type of disc golf target
- Brose Baskets, a former name of Brose Bamberg, a professional basketball club based in Bamberg, Germany
- Düsseldorf Baskets, a professional basketball club based in Düsseldorf, Germany
- ETB Wohnbau Baskets, a professional basketball club based in Essen, Germany
- Paderborn Baskets, a professional basketball club based in Paderborn, Germany
- SCH Würzburg Baskets and s. Oliver Baskets, former names of s.Oliver Würzburg, a professional basketball club based in Würzburg, Germany
- Telekom Baskets Bonn, a professional basketball club based in Bonn, Germany
- Uni Baskets Münster, a professional basketball club based in Münster, Germany

== See also ==
- Baskett, a surname
- Baskette, a surname
