= Newspapers in Australia =

Australian newspaper publications

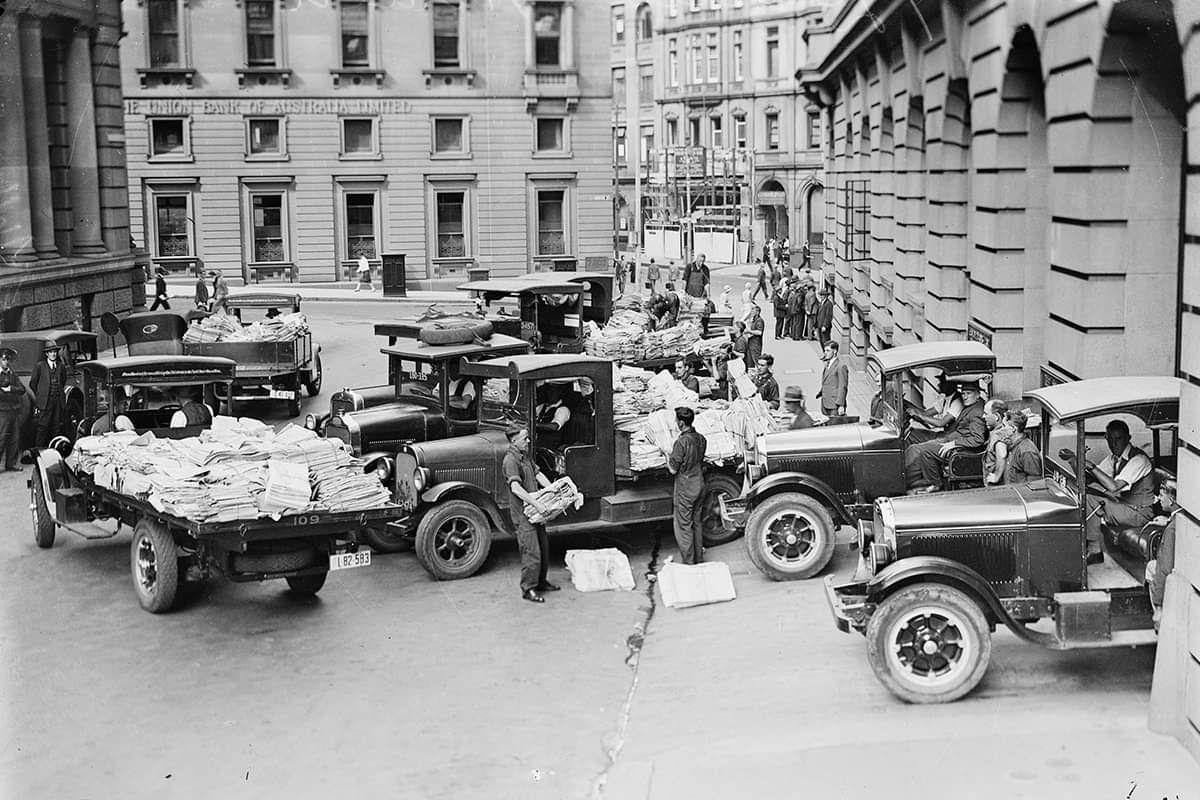
Newspapers being loaded onto trucks outside the Sydney Morning Herald office, O’Connell Street, Sydney, 1920

There are two national and 10 state/territory daily newspapers, 35 regional dailies and 470 other regional and suburban newspapers in Australia. Each state and territory has one or two dominant daily newspapers which focus upon the major national news while also containing news of importance for the state that it is sold in. These include: the Sydney Morning Herald, Daily Telegraph (Sydney), The Age , Herald Sun (Melbourne) and Canberra Times. The two national daily newspapers are The Australian and the Australian Financial Review, which are owned by different companies. Nearly all major metropolitan newspapers are owned either by News Corp Australia, or Nine Entertainment, with notable exceptions including The West Australian and The Sunday Times in Perth, and The Canberra Times in the nation's capital city.

Other notable newspapers and news websites are: news.com.au, ABC News Online, Seven News Online, SBS News Online, Nine News, the Guardian Australia, The New Daily and The Saturday Paper. Increasingly, news material is published online in Australia, sometimes exclusively.

== History ==
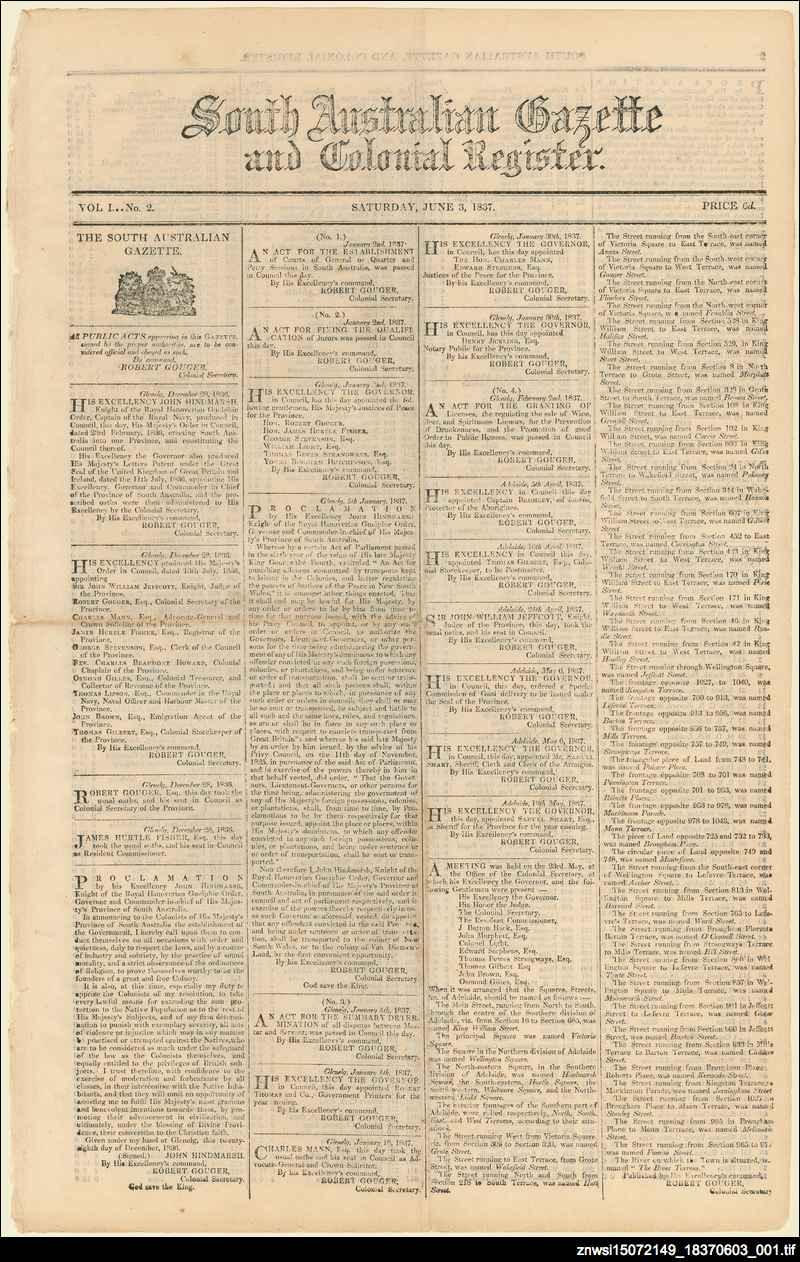
South Australian Register and Colonial Gazette, Adelaide, 3 June 1837

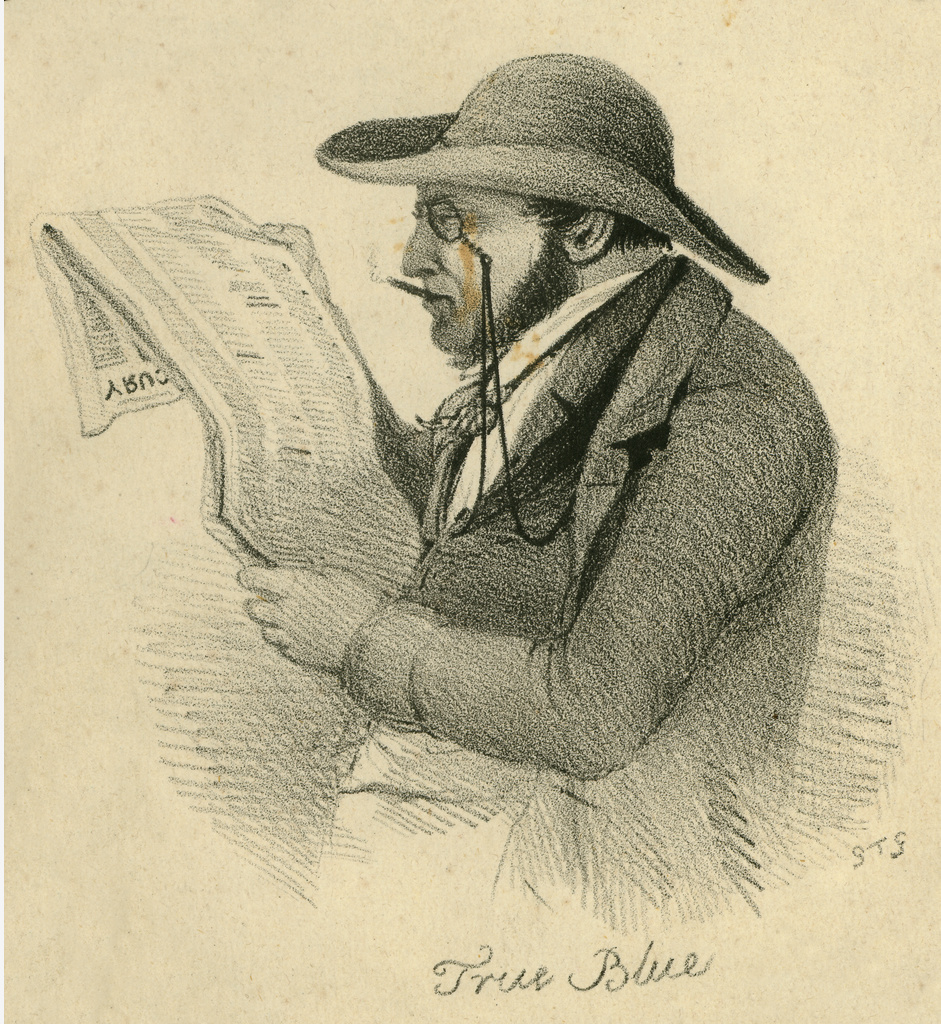
Sydney ship captain reading a newspaper, mid 19th century

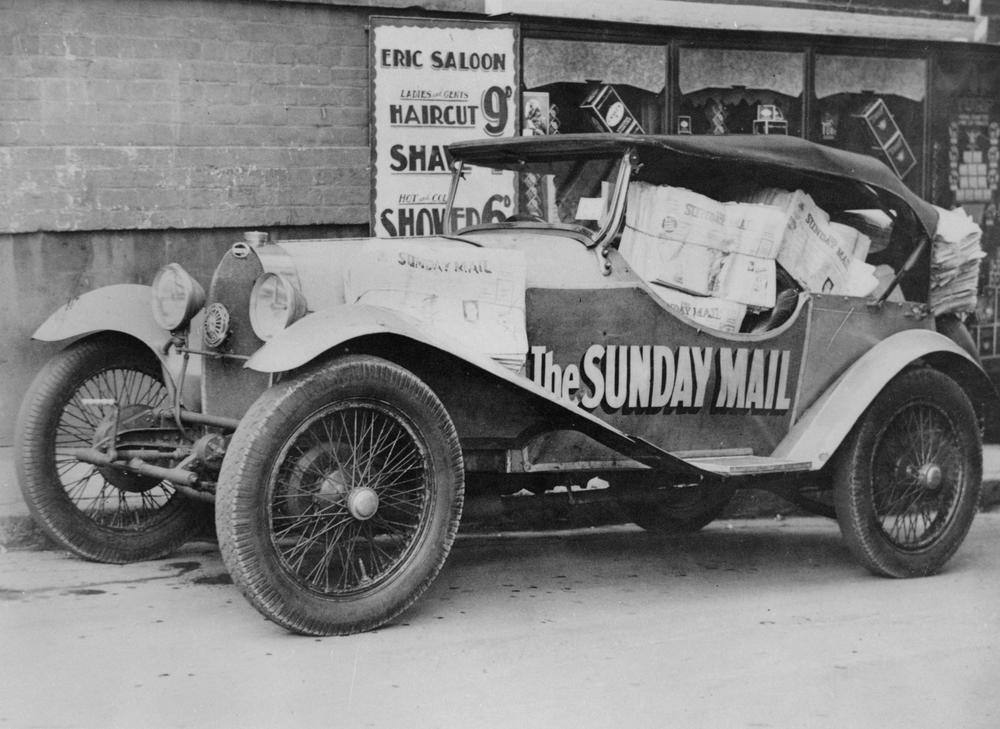
Newspaper delivery vehicle for The Sunday Mail, Brisbane, early 20th century

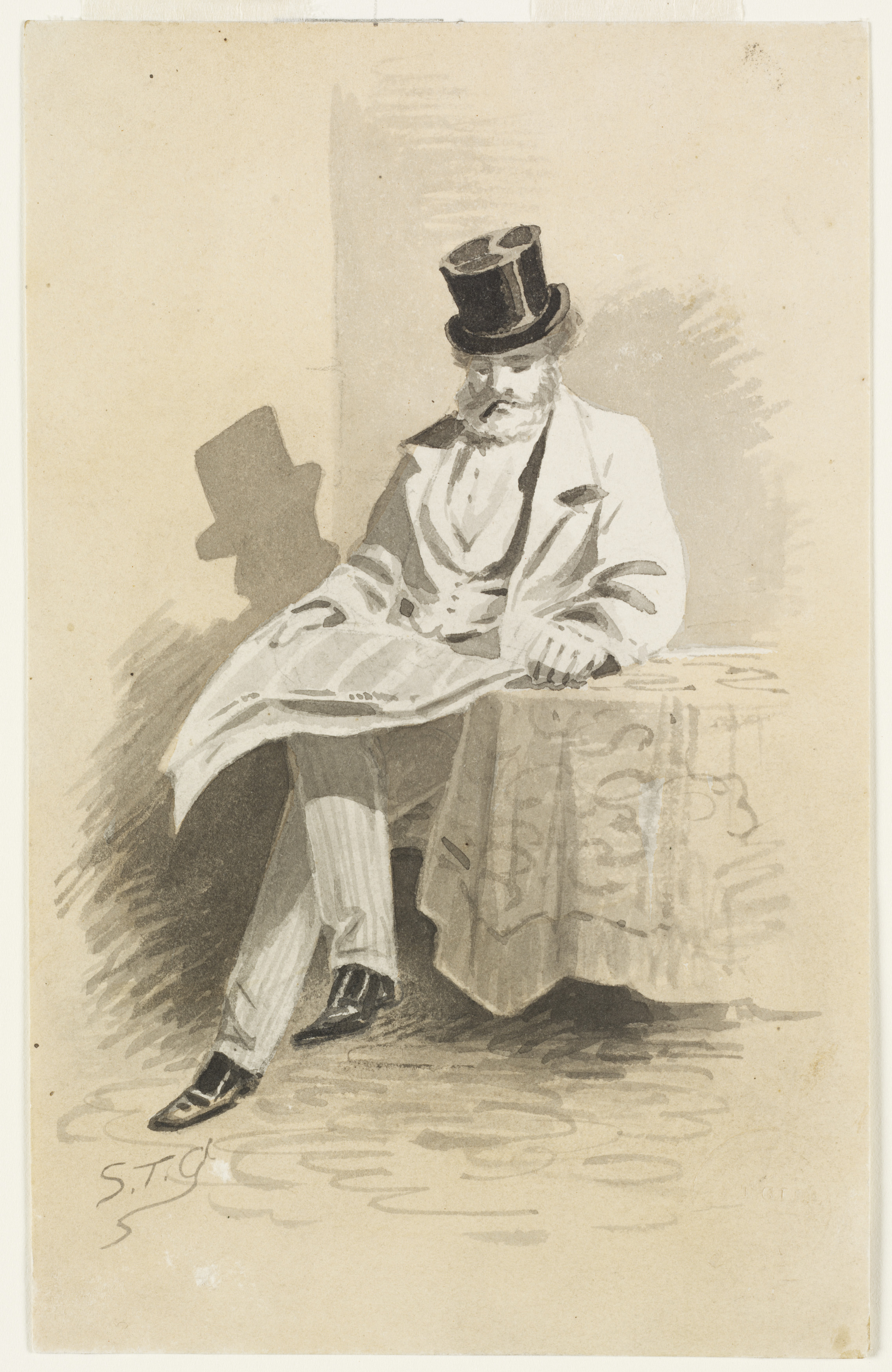
Gentleman reading a newspaper

=== 19th century ===
Australia's first newspaper was the Sydney Gazette and New South Wales Advertiser, which began in 1803. In 1810, the second newspaper in Australia, the Derwent Star and Van Diemen's Land Intelligencer was founded in Van Diemen's Land (Tasmania), but it was short-lived and ceased publication the same year.

These early newspapers were subject to government censorship. The first to be free of this restriction was the Sydney newspaper The Australian (1824). The governor of New South Wales realised there was little point continuing to censor the Sydney Gazette when its rival was free of censorship and so the freedom of the press began in Australia.

Victoria's first paper was the Melbourne Advertiser, which began in 1838. By the mid-1850s, there were 11 papers in Tasmania alone. The Tasmanian and Port Dalrymple Advertiser founded in Launceston in 1825 was the first provincial newspaper in Australia.

Early newspapers tended to consist of four pages and generally appeared one or two days a week. They were hindered by occasional shortages of suitable paper, ink, compositors and printers. Publication sometimes had to be suspended due to such shortages.

Australia's longest-running newspaper, the Sydney Morning Herald, was first published as the Sydney Herald in 1831. The Herald's rival, The Daily Telegraph, was first published in July 1879. Weekly newspapers were an important feature of the Australian newspaper scene in the nineteenth century. Illustrated newspapers became increasingly important from 1850 onwards. They initially featured wood-engravings and toward the end of the nineteenth century black and white photographs began to appear.

Australia's first foreign-language newspaper, Die Deutsche Post für die australischen Kolonien, was published in Adelaide from 1848 to 1850.

Australia's first national daily newspaper, Daily Commercial News (now Lloyd's List Australia), was first published in April 1891. Only during the second part of the twentieth century did other national newspapers start to be published.

Newspapers played an important role in Australia in the nineteenth century. According to historian and former newspaper man Thomas McCombie in his History of the Colony of Victoria (1858):

the newspaper press constitutes nearly the only literature published in the Australian colonies. It monopolises the greater part of the thought. The newspaper occupy the space of all literature, and stop the channels of information from all other sources; by far the largest class derive no information from any other quarter ...

These sentiments were echoed by Richard Twopeny in Town Life in Australia (1883):

This is essentially the land of newspapers. Nearly everyone can read, and nearly everybody has the leisure to do so ... The proportion of the population who can afford to purchase and subscribe to newspapers is ten times as large as in England; hence the number of sheets issued is comparatively much greater.

=== 20th century ===
This national obsession with newspapers continued into the 20th century. The historian Ken Inglis wrote in 1962 that,

Australians are more intensely addicted to daily newspapers than almost all other people in the world ... We buy more than 40 papers a day per 100 of population. Nearly 90 per cent of us usually read, or look at, a morning paper, and 70 per cent an evening paper.

There were 26 metropolitan dailies in 1924, but this had fallen to 14 by the 1960s due to closures and amalgamations. During the same period, the number of separate proprietors had gone from 21 to seven.

During the 1980s and 1990s colour printing and cold offset printing took place in the production of newspapers. Many newspapers became available in electronic form either on CD-ROM or via the World Wide Web.

=== 21st century ===
The disruption of traditional print media by digital media that began late in the 20th century continued into the 21st century. In response, newspapers in Australia closed, amalgamated or laid off staff – by 2011, the top two newspaper owners accounted for 86% of newspaper sales in Australia. All major newspapers and most minor newspapers in Australia now produce a digital version of their publication. Many periodicals produce a digital version only. Further major changes to legacy media in Australia seem inevitable.

The COVID-19 pandemic impacted Australian news media by reducing advertising income. Some titles were closed permanently, while others were suspended for a time. In response, the Australian government provided financial support for regional media outlets.

== See also ==
- Journalism in Australia
- List of newspapers in Australia
- List of newspapers in Australia by circulation
- List of people in communications and media in Australia
- Media of Australia
