= Journalism in Australia =

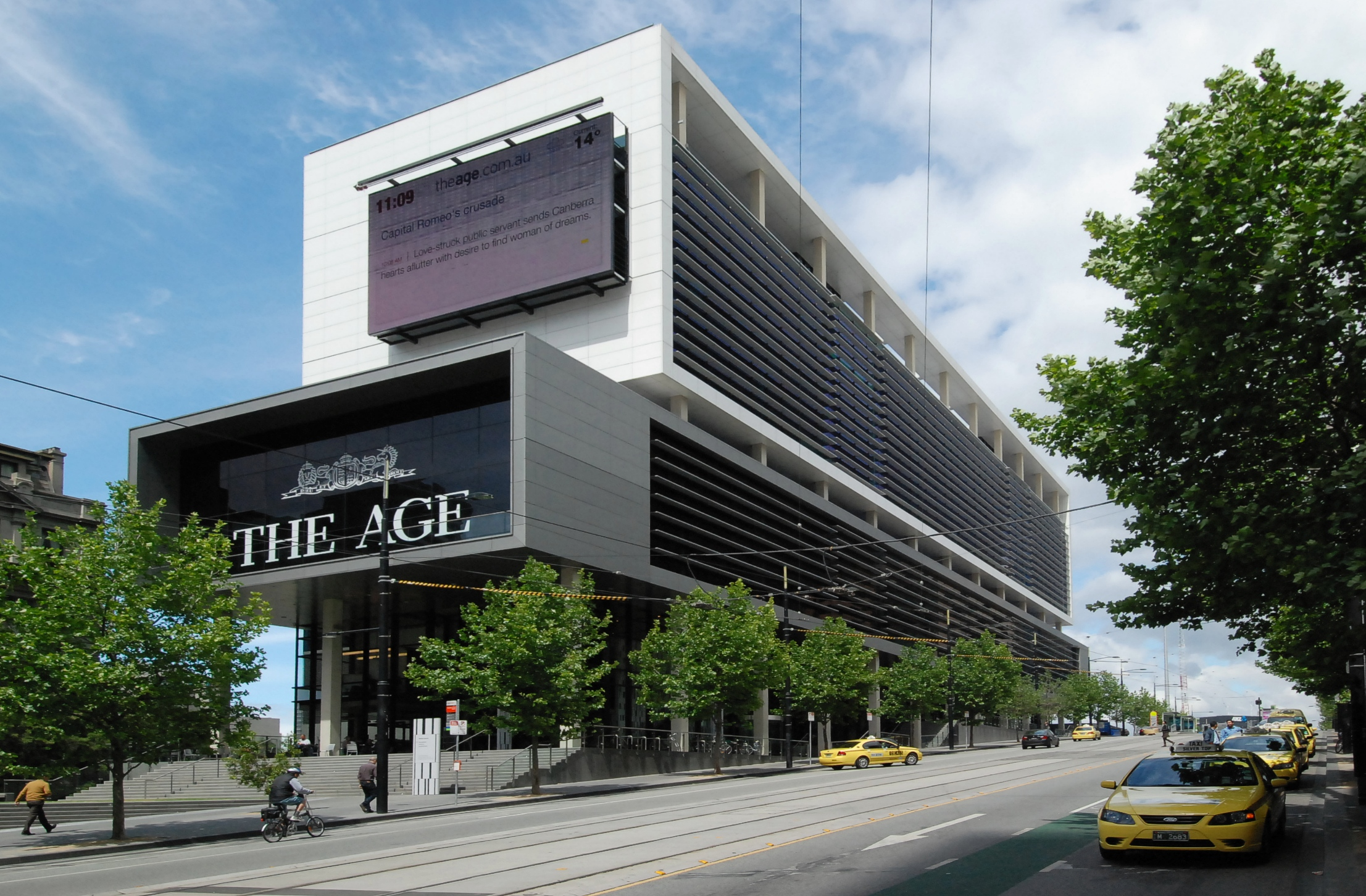
The Age former headquarters in Melbourne

Journalism has an extensive history in Australia. Reporters Without Borders placed Australia 26th on a list of 180 countries ranked by press freedom in 2020, ahead of both the United Kingdom and United States. Most print media in the country is owned by either News Corp Australia or Nine Entertainment.

== History ==
The front page of the Sydney Gazette

Most of the published material in the first twenty years of the New South Wales colony was to inform residents of the rules and laws of the time. These were printed with a portable wooden and iron printing press. Since half of the convicts of the time were not able to read, it was compulsory for these notices to be read at Sunday church services.

On 22 November 1800, George Howe arrived in Australia. Nicknamed "Happy", Howe was born in the West Indies, although his father had been a native of Ireland. In London, Howe had worked in the print industry for several newspapers including The Times, but was sent to New South Wales after being charged with shoplifting, a crime which was also punishable by hanging.

In 1803, Howe started production on Australia's first newspaper, the Sydney Gazette. While much of its content was government notices, there was also an abundance of news to report in the burgeoning colony. An extract from the paper about the first Koala to be captured told of the "graveness of the visage", which "would seem to indicate a more than ordinary portion of animal sagacity".

One news gathering technique that Howe used for local content was to place a slip box outside of the store where the Gazette was published, to let the public suggest stories. Because of the country's geographic isolation, international news arriving via arriving ships was usually printed 10 to 14 weeks out of date.

The Sydney Gazette was the only paper published on the mainland until 1824, when William Wentworth began publishing the colony's first uncensored newspaper, The Australian (no connection with the current paper of the same name, which was established by Rupert Murdoch in 1964).

The Australian Journalist's Association (AJA) was formed in 1910 and registered federally in 1911. In 1921, the University of Queensland became the first Australian institution to offer a diploma of journalism. The AJA was amalgamated in 1992 into the Media, Entertainment and Arts Alliance.

In 1956, Ampol Petroleum founder Sir William Gaston Walkley established Australia's most prestigious Journalism Awards, the Walkleys.

On 16 October 1975, five Australian journalists, now known as the Balibo Five, reporting on the invasion of East Timor (then Portuguese Timor) by Indonesia were murdered at a house in Balibo. The journalists, from both the Nine Network and the Seven Network, were killed by Indonesian soldiers after recording footage which proved Indonesia was behind the conflict, as opposed to the claim it was an internal Timorese coup.

Paul Moran, an ABC cameraman from Adelaide became the first Australian journalist to die while covering the Iraq war in March 2003. He was killed while working when a car bomb near him exploded. The ABC foreign correspondent working with Moran, Eric Campbell, survived the explosion and went on to write about the incident in his book Absurdistan.

== Legal protection ==
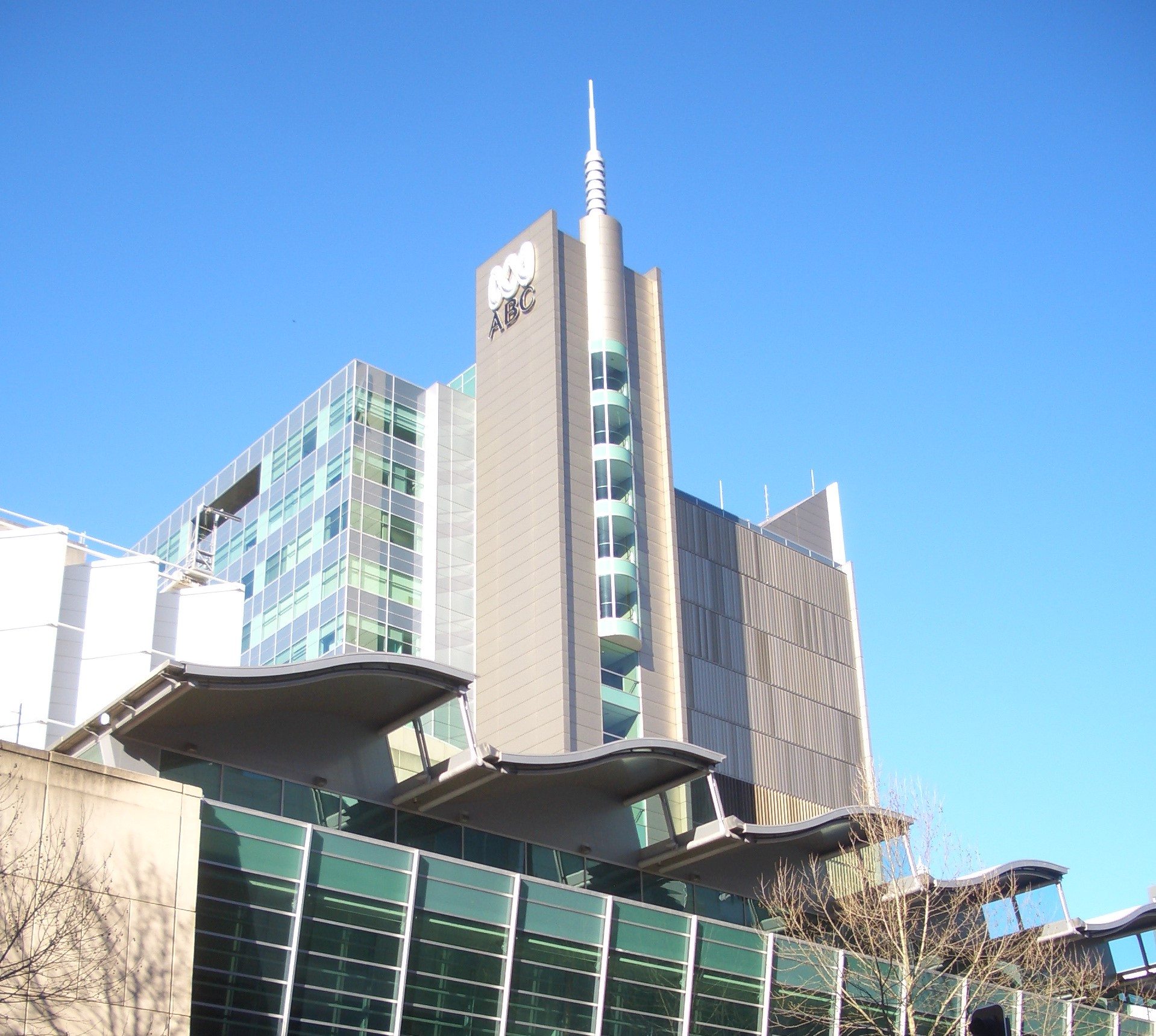
The ABC headquarters in Sydney

Australian journalists are more vulnerable to defamation action than many of their international counterparts. Australia lacks both a bill of rights and an explicit rights to freedom of speech in the Australian constitution. Writing in 2021, the BBC stated that "Australian media outlets have been overwhelmingly united in their criticism of strict local defamation laws".

The 2006 Reporters Without Borders survey ranking the countries of the world in relative press freedom listed Australia as number 35 behind Ghana and Mauritius. Australia's score of nine had increased greatly since scoring a much better three in 2002. According to the Australia's Right to Know campaign, a collaborative effort between all major Australian media publishers and outlets, major causes in the decline of press freedom include anti-terrorism legislation (Australian anti-terrorism legislation, 2004 and Australian Anti-Terrorism Act 2005), sedition laws, suppression orders and Freedom of Information requests.

=== Implied freedom ===
In 1992, the High Court of Australia saw the case of Australian Capital Television Pty Ltd v Commonwealth, concerning a decision the previous year which inserted Part IIID into the Broadcasting Act 1942. The resulting regulations banned political advertising during Federal, State or Local elections. There was some free time provided for political messages, but 90 percent of this was allocated to parties in the previous government. A majority decision found in favour of Australian Capital Television, ruling there was an implied right to freedom of political communication in the constitution.

The 4–3 decision of the Theophanous v Herald and Weekly Times Ltd case two years later enforced the previous ruling to the extent of validating the constitution's implied freedom of speech as a defamation defense, however this would not last.

=== Lange v ABC ===
In 1997, the High Court heard the case of former New Zealand Prime Minister Lange v Australian Broadcasting Corporation on the rulings of the Theophanous and Stephens v West Australian Newspapers. "While the judges unanimously confirmed the existence of an implied constitutional freedom of political speech, they did not cite it as a defense against defamation action by politicians."

Since Australian law does not currently accept the implied freedoms as a defamation defense, Australian journalists facing slander or libel must use common law defense. This involves the defendant proving that they:

- did believe defamatory imputations were true
- undertook reasonable steps to confirm the accuracy of defamatory information
- had reasonable grounds for a belief that defamatory imputations were true
- included a response from the defamed person, except where this was seen as not practical or was unnecessary

== Education in journalism ==
Many Australian universities provide journalism and communication courses. The majority of new Australian journalists have a tertiary education in the field. In 2000, seven of eight cadetships given by the Age were given to those with a journalism degree. In the same year, however, the Media, Entertainment and Arts Alliance estimated Australian universities produced approximately 600 students graduating with either a Bachelor of Journalism or an undergraduate degree majoring in Journalism, with another (approx.) 50 graduates with a Masters qualification. The alliance estimated these graduates were competing for fewer than 150 jobs. Since that time the situation has worsened considerably, with a record 4750 journalism students enrolled in 2010 for fewer than 1000 jobs. Additionally, depending on their own personal preference, many editors prefer to employ graduates with qualifications in other fields in the belief that they (as working journalists) are better equipped to pass on journalistic skills than academics (who have left the profession).

The following Australian tertiary educational institutions provide journalism courses:

- Curtin University of Technology, Perth, Western Australia
- Central Queensland University
- Edith Cowan University, Perth, Western Australia
- Bond University, Gold Coast, Queensland
- Charles Sturt University
- Deakin University
- Griffith University
- James Cook University, Townsville
- Jschool: Journalism Education & Training, Brisbane
- La Trobe University, Melbourne
- Macleay College, Sydney and Melbourne
- Macquarie University, Sydney
- Monash University, Melbourne
- Murdoch University, Perth, Western Australia
- Queensland University of Technology
- Royal Melbourne Institute of Technology
- Swinburne University of Technology, Melbourne
- University of Canberra
- University of Melbourne, Melbourne
- University of Newcastle
- University of New South Wales
- University of Notre Dame
- University of Southern Queensland
- University of Queensland
- University of South Australia
- University of the Sunshine Coast
- Western Sydney University
- University of Wollongong
- University of Technology, Sydney

== See also ==
- Australian Broadcasting Corporation
- Media of Australia
- List of newspapers in Australia
- Journalism
- Journalism education
- Media, Entertainment and Arts Alliance
- Media Watch
- Newspapers in Australia
- Walkley Awards
- National Women's Media Centre
- Television in Australia#News and current affairs
- List of Australian television news services
- Australian Financial Review
- 6 News Australia
