= List of newspapers in Australia by circulation =

Note that this article provides historical figures only for selected papers only with very few updates since 2018. Newspapers such Guardian Australia, Crikey and The Saturday Paper are not listed.

There are several measures of circulation of newspapers. The Australian Bureau of Circulations (ABCs) Paid Media Audit Data provides independent verification of paid media distribution in Australia. Measures are also divided by electronic and print versions. The trend shown over the years is continuously declining for the print newspapers and surging for electronic newspapers since the 21st century.

== Circulation of print newspapers ==
Circulation of print newspapers is typically divided into Monday–Friday, Saturday/weekend and Sunday for each quarter. In 2017 the Audited Media Association of Australia announced that circulation figures were to be published every six months. The Herald Sun has the highest circulation in Australia. Based in one of the country's two major cities, Melbourne, it is the result of the amalgamation of the original Sun and Herald newspapers.

Title	2018	2017	2016	2015	2014	2013	2012	2011	2010	2009	2008	2007	2006	2005
The Australian Financial Review	139,834	44,635	48,844	54,430	57,451	64,270	68,425	73,158	75,339	79,201	87,702	88,264	86,182	85,373
The Australian	88,581	94,448	98,757	102,222	104,774	116,854	126,901	133,081	136,268	134,100	140,000	133,000	131,538	133,841
The Canberra Times	13,808	15,298	17,059	19,347	23,183	25,228	28,162	30,420	32,116	34,000	34,687	33,935	36,027	36,695
Daily Telegraph	221,641	221,641	236,574	254,722	273,241	289,839	341,583	347,924	363,399	360,781	375,000	392,000	396,497	397,915
The Sydney Morning Herald	78,789	88,634	97,530	107,127	114,634	136,623	161,169	189,803	204,421	208,210	209,508	212,700	212,078	210,085
Northern Territory News	11,279	11,279	12,569	13,925	13,670	16,757	19,030	20,510	21,103	22,128	22,188	20,880	21,172	22,090
The Courier-Mail	135,007	135,007	142,776	153,532	158,286	172,816	190,915	194,949	206,110	216,503	222,500	221,049	216,075	211,279
The Advertiser	112,097	112,097	121,079	129,319	136,458	148,430	169,889	175,372	180,807	186,669	185,683	191,325	195,903	201,323
The Mercury	28,265	28,265	30,075	31,765	33,111	35,821	40,638	41,443	44,221		46,758	46,985	48,886	49,601
The Age	74,360	83,229	91,166	99,807	106,843	133,981	158,485	190,750	190,100	200,800	203,800	207,000	201,000	193,000
Herald Sun	303,140	303,140	324,124	340,113	363,384	399,638	460,370	481,573	500,800	505,500	503,500	535,000	554,700	551,500
The West Australian	128,365	153,431	136,076	152,357	158,400	172,188	190,251	188,947	192,230	195,211	194,862	203,328	205,610	207,914

Weekend/Saturday Print
	The Australian Financial Review	The Australian	The Canberra Times	Daily Telegraph	The Sydney Morning Herald	Northern Territory News	The Courier-Mail	The Advertiser	The Mercury	The Age	Herald Sun	The West Australian
2002	90320	297158	72080	335388	399455	31773	343323	280490	65308	318900	515598	385871
2003	86679	295168	72835	341062	391678	31777	346445	281117	65194	315250	517650	384976
2004	87680	300360	71049	341240	373750	31932	342253	278385	64905	304200	521000	381079
2005	89360	291752	68743	342657	360323	32442	333910	274364	64297	297500	523500	380417
2006	90998	293966	67371	342724	363901	31511	326825	269695	63554	301000	522400	372608
2007	92194	299500	63115	340000	364000	31150	316662	259807	61985	301000	513000	356844
2008	92415	301000	59939	327000	358224	31860	309602	256063	61813	301500	510500	342787
Jul-Sep 2008		307000	58978	316000	347299	32611	310224	256134		292300	503500	336532
Jul-Sep 2009		302115	56000	318944	348300	32810	295056	251486		284500	505000	329911
Jul-Sep 2010	72898	300078		325000	332066	32260	278982	242903	60082	273300	495600	
Jul-Sep 2011	71834	283793		317796	315548	39241	264634	238671	57292	265704	471644	
Jul-Sep 2012	69012	277386	45162	318092	265457	28961	248452	224976	54469	225976	455197	301466
Jul-Sep 2013	62278	250186	37319	274050	231989	25315	221572	200456	49440	198537	399730	278332
Jul-Sep 2014	55354	231349		262920	214387							
Oct-Dec 2014	63621	227486	32094	275380	210115	19636	197963	178350	45367	180447	362399	255335
Jan-Mar 2015	61911	230182	31652	265111	208053	18999	199153	176951	45619	178721	353346	249865
Apr-Jun 2015	62643	225206	30280	244587	199472	19709	188217	171730	43612	172280	347230	265143
Jul-Sep 2015	52892	223526	29144	244863	196406	19821	193895	173354	42396	168411		
Oct-Dec 2015	58523	224691	28750	257943	194207	18198	189654	168293	42423	166917	347175	239623
Jan-Mar 2016	62345	227465	28210	247946	191728	17318	180050	167357	42609	164774	342546	242298
Apr-Jun 2016	53121	223926	26894	233546	186918	17252	179149	162731	40918	159801	335232	232176
Jul-Sep 2016	48009	220945	25571	228360	181113	17979	181932	165110	39455	152471	317517	219606
Oct-Dec 2016	56141	221930	24940	235091	177722	16371	173014	156374	38914	152229	322360	207801
Jan- Jun 2017	48773	219242	23470	221996	168470	14624	166502	114005	37646	144574	306571	216071

Sunday Print
	CANBERRA TIMES	SUN-HERALD	SUNDAY TELEGRAPH	SUNDAY TERRITORIAN	SUNDAY MAIL (QLD)	SUNDAY MAIL (SA)	SUNDAY TASMANIAN	SUNDAY AGE	SUNDAY HERALDSUN	SUNDAY TIMES (WA)
2002	39075	559725	726906	27083	601851	345407	58245	199350	570647	346037
2003	39161	542735	734021	25422	611298	340667	59227	194500	582630	352000
2004	38877	524777	726153	24535	615328	334872	59720	194500	603000	354000
2005	37844	514542	720030	24811	615920	330998	61110	200000	620000	354000
2006	36892	516394	702125	23386	607975	324973	61391	210000	623000	347500
2007	34674	505000	671500	22340	592440	318179	60134	225000	620000	336500
2008	34316	483220	663000	22658	565173	313469	59930	227500	622000	328000
Jul-Sep 2008	35116	478890	657424	23548	566773	305808		225700	615000	320000
Jul-Sep 2009	35000	447946	638354	23498	537764	306556		226900	612500	316544
Jul-Sep 2010		429199	635269	22624	506975	294930	57868	226700	593700	293136
Jul-Sep 2011		410407	606101	21981	479884	284141	54945	228826	555684	282000
Jul-Sep 2012	28808	322959	600236	21220	453871	267625	51617	193545	524237	269910
Jul-Sep 2013	25335	273790	516584	18182	415184	239488	46901	167775	470326	240486
Jul-Sep 2014	19652	205667	437560	15923	347108	206435	40179	135731	396251	
Oct-Dec 2014	21578	227340	489257	14450	363068	214609	42645	147017	417442	204892
Jan-Mar 2015										
Apr-Jun 2015	20312	212280	439926	15144	342381	205643	40916	139989	400657	193842
Jul-Sep 2015										
Oct-Dec 2015	19700	200851	452377	15363	339738	200264	40232	136043	396574	184012
Jan-Mar 2016										
Apr-Jun 2016	18305	188806	410137	14214	318830	200102	38925	128478	384993	184486
Jul-Sep 2016	17271	182626	401702	14912	321840	200027	37926	122547	374918	
Oct-Dec 2016	16842	175652	406326	14343	308339	190789	37607	123229	368912	173511
Jan- Jun 2017	15775	164652	378449	12772	289888	182462	36212	115056	349252	183128

== Circulation of digital newspapers ==
For the quarterly reporting period of the ABC data, from March to June 2016, Fairfax made the decision to remove its digital circulation numbers because it believes the figures, released by the Audited Media Association of Australia (AMAA), wrongfully suggest subscriptions at The Sydney Morning Herald and The Age are falling. In October 2017, The Australian owned by News Corp, claimed to be the first newspaper in Australia achieving over 100,000 paying online subscribers.

	Australian Financial Review	The Australian	Canberra Times	Daily Telegraph	Sydney Morning Herald	Northern Territory News	The Courier-Mail	The Advertiser	The Mercury	The Age	Herald Sun	The West Australian
Jul-Sep 2015		73118			139752	478				136009	63615	7959
Oct-Dec 2015		75018			138165					133496	66866	
Jan- Mar 2016		77371			134934							
Apr-Jun 2016		79018									73470	
Jul-Sep 2016		80722				1130			1430		75067	16528
Oct-Dec 2016		83833				1517			1928		75865	17517
Jan- Jun 2017		85349				3051			3793		77213	19672
Jan- Jun 2018	0	135783	0	114203	0	3051	80291	85770	3793	0	108801	6037

== Circulation of local/community newspapers ==
Local/Community newspapers tend to be distributed free of charge to a given community/area. A measure of paid print copies has no meaning in this circumstance. Readership tends to be measured by the number of copies distributed. Below are the distribution numbers for the quarter ending December 2016.(registration required)

Publication	Average Net Distribution (Dec. 2016)	Publisher	Region
ADVOCATE ELLENBROOK EDITION	12583	Community Newspaper Group Ltd	WA Metropolitan
ALBANY EXTRA	18954	West Australian Regional Newspapers Pty ltd	WA Regional
ALBERT & LOGAN NEWS	70970	Quest Community Newspapers	QLD Metropolitan
ALBURY WODONGA NEWS WEEKLY	22164	Star News Group	NSW Regional
ARMADALE EXAMINER	22905	Examiner Newspapers (WA)	WA Metropolitan
ARMIDALE EXPRESS EXTRA	13523	Fairfax Regional Media - Tamworth	NSW Regional
AUGUSTA MARGARET RIVER MAIL	5808	Fairfax Regional Media - WA	WA Regional
AUGUSTA MARGARET RIVER TIMES	6834	West Australian Regional Newspapers Pty Ltd	WA Regional
AVON VALLEY GAZETTE	1444	Community Newspaper Group Ltd	WA Metropolitan
BALLINA SHIRE ADVOCATE	16346	APN Australian Regional Media	NSW Regional
BANKSTOWN-CANTERBURY TORCH	88607	Torch Publishing Co Pty Ltd	NSW Metropolitan
BAROSSA & LIGHT HERALD	12572	Barossa News Pty Ltd	SA Metropolitan
BAYSIDE & NORTHERN SUBURBS STAR	37454	APN Australian Regional Media(Bayside)	QLD Metropolitan
BAYSIDE LEADER	39479	Leader Newspaper Group	VIC Metropolitan
BENDIGO WEEKLY	38093	Bendigo Publishing Pty Ltd	VIC Regional
BERWICK NEWS	32112	Star News Group	VIC Metropolitan
BLACKTOWN ADVOCATE	47904	NewsLocal	NSW Metropolitan
BLACKTOWN SUN	38278	Fairfax Community Newspapers NSW	NSW Metropolitan
BLUE MOUNTAINS GAZETTE	35271	Fairfax Regional Media - Orange	NSW Regional
BRIBIE WEEKLY	12535	APN Australian Regional Media	QLD Regional
BRIMBANK & NORTHWEST STAR WEEKLY	60655	MMP Star Pty Ltd	VIC Metropolitan
BROOME ADVERTISER	7455	West Australian Regional Newspapers Pty Ltd	WA Regional
BUDERIM CHRONICLE	16402	APN Australian Regional Media	QLD Regional
BUNBURY HERALD	29010	West Australian Regional Newspapers Pty Ltd	WA Regional
BUNBURY MAIL	25439	Fairfax Regional Media - WA	WA Regional
BUSSELTON DUNSBOROUGH MAIL	14400	Fairfax Regional Media - WA	WA Regional
BUSSELTON DUNSBOROUGH TIMES	15527	West Australian Regional Newspapers Pty Ltd	WA Regional
BYRON SHIRE ECHO	23190	Echo Publications Pty Ltd	NSW Regional
BYRON SHIRE NEWS	15534	APN Australian Regional Media	NSW Regional
CABOOLTURE NEWS	33696	APN Australian Regional Media	QLD Regional
CABOOLTURE SHIRE HERALD	34151	Quest Community Newspapers	QLD Metropolitan
CAIRNS SUN	21962	Cairns Post Pty Ltd	QLD Regional
CALOUNDRA WEEKLY	18878	APN Australian Regional Media	QLD Regional
CAMDEN ADVERTISER	20434	Fairfax Community Newspapers NSW	NSW Metropolitan
CAMDEN HAVEN COURIER	8352	Fairfax Regional Media - Port Macquarie	NSW Regional
CAMPBELLTOWN MACARTHUR ADVERTISER	47551	Fairfax Community Newspapers NSW	NSW Metropolitan
CANBERRA WEEKLY MAGAZINE	42631	Newstate Media Pty Ltd	Australian Capital Territory
CANNING EXAMINER NEWSPAPER	32132	Examiner Newspapers (WA)	WA Metropolitan
CANNING TIMES	25488	Community Newspaper Group Ltd	WA Metropolitan
CANTERBURY BANKSTOWN EXPRESS	70926	NewsLocal	NSW Metropolitan
CAPRICORN COAST MIRROR	11699	APN Australian Regional Media	QLD Regional
CAULFIELD GLEN EIRA LEADER	30532	Leader Newspaper Group	VIC Metropolitan
CENTRAL	26036	NewsLocal	NSW Metropolitan
CENTRAL COAST EXPRESS ADVOCATE GOSFORD-FRI	57759	NewsLocal	NSW Regional
CENTRAL COAST EXPRESS ADVOCATE GOSFORD-WED	57752	NewsLocal	NSW Regional
CENTRAL COAST EXPRESS ADVOCATE WYONG-FRI	55064	NewsLocal	NSW Regional
CENTRAL COAST EXPRESS ADVOCATE WYONG-WED	55064	NewsLocal	NSW Regional
CESSNOCK ADVERTISER	17033	Fairfax Regional Media - Maitland	NSW Regional
CHELSEA-MORDIALLOC NEWS	18842	Mornington Peninsula News Group	VIC Regional
CITY NORTH MESSENGER	34116	Messenger Newspapers Pty Ltd	SA Metropolitan
CITY NORTH NEWS	21740	Quest Community Newspapers	QLD Metropolitan
CITY SOUTH NEWS	18725	Quest Community Newspapers	QLD Metropolitan
COASTAL VIEWS	10743	APN Australian Regional Media	NSW Regional
COCKBURN GAZETTE	30983	Community Newspaper Group Ltd	WA Metropolitan
COFFS COAST ADVOCATE	30564	APN Australian Regional Media	NSW Regional
COMMENT NEWS ARMADALE EDITION	20957	Community Newspaper Group Ltd	WA Metropolitan
COMMENT NEWS GOSNELLS EDITION	28791	Community Newspaper Group Ltd	WA Metropolitan
COOKS RIVER VALLEY TIMES	21986	Torch Publishing Co Pty Ltd	NSW Metropolitan
COOLUM & NORTH SHORE NEWS	12508	APN Australian Regional Media	QLD Regional
COUNTRY NEWS	39035	Shepparton Newspapers	VIC Regional
CRANBOURNE LEADER	25830	Leader Newspaper Group	VIC Metropolitan
CRANBOURNE NEWS	31421	Star News Group	VIC Metropolitan
DANDENONG JOURNAL	45130	Star News Group	VIC Regional
DIAMOND VALLEY LEADER - BANYULE ED.	21373	Leader Newspaper Group	VIC Metropolitan
DIAMOND VALLEY LEADER - NILLUMBIK ED.	16385	Leader Newspaper Group	VIC Metropolitan
EAST GIPPSLAND NEWS	16500	James Yeates & Sons Pty Ltd	VIC Regional
EAST TORRENS MESSENGER	28518	Messenger Newspapers Pty Ltd	SA Metropolitan
EASTERN COURIER MESSENGER	44174	Messenger Newspapers Pty Ltd	SA Metropolitan
EASTERN REPORTER	45765	Community Newspaper Group Ltd	WA Metropolitan
ECHO NEWS EASTSIDE	20579	Birkenhead Pty Ltd	WA Metropolitan
ECHO NEWS ELLENBROOK	13586	Birkenhead Pty Ltd	WA Metropolitan
ECHO NEWS KALAMUNDA	23273	Birkenhead Pty Ltd	WA Metropolitan
ECHO NEWS MUNDARING	8309	Birkenhead Pty Ltd	WA Metropolitan
FAIRFIELD ADVANCE	51441	NewsLocal	NSW Metropolitan
FAIRFIELD CITY CHAMPION	53055	Fairfax Community Newspapers NSW	NSW Metropolitan
FLINDERS NEWS	9961	Northern Argus	SA Metropolitan
FRANKSTON STANDARD LEADER	54070	Leader Newspaper Group	VIC Metropolitan
FRANKSTON TIMES	29880	Mornington Peninsula News Group	VIC Regional
FREMANTLE GAZETTE	14104	Community Newspaper Group Ltd	WA Metropolitan
FREMANTLE HERALD	74652	Herald Publishing Co Pty Ltd	WA Metropolitan
GATTON, LOCKYER & BRISBANE VALLEY STAR	19358	APN Australian Regional Media	QLD Regional
GEELONG INDEPENDENT	51500	Star News Group	VIC Regional
GIPPSLAND TIMES	13193	Gippsland Times	VIC Regional
GLASSHOUSE COUNTRY NEWS	11359	Blurb Communications Pty Ltd	QLD Regional
GOLD COAST SUN	192901	Quest Community Newspapers	QLD Regional
GOSNELLS EXAMINER	36309	Examiner Newspapers (WA)	WA Metropolitan
GREATER DANDENONG LEADER	40488	Leader Newspaper Group	VIC Metropolitan
GUARDIAN EXPRESS	26817	Community Newspaper Group Ltd	WA Metropolitan
GUARDIAN INCORPORATING MIDWEEK DRUM	21901	APN Australian Regional Media	QLD Regional
GUARDIAN MESSENGER	60887	Messenger Newspapers Pty Ltd	SA Metropolitan
HARVEY REPORTER	4128	West Australian Regional Newspapers Pty Ltd	WA Regional
HAWKESBURY COURIER	19582	Fairfax Regional Media - Orange	NSW Regional
HEIDELBERG LEADER	24471	Leader Newspaper Group	VIC Metropolitan
HERVEY BAY OBSERVER	22600	APN Australian Regional Media	QLD Regional
HILLS GAZETTE EAST EDITION	12008	Community Newspaper Group Ltd	WA Metropolitan
HILLS GAZETTE KALAMUNDA EDITION	17165	Community Newspaper Group Ltd	WA Metropolitan
HILLS NEWS	49185	Fairfax Community Newspapers NSW	NSW Metropolitan
HILLS SHIRE TIMES	57197	NewsLocal	NSW Metropolitan
HORNSBY & UPPER NORTH SHORE ADVOCATE	47365	NewsLocal	NSW Metropolitan
HUME LEADER	41315	Leader Newspaper Group	VIC Metropolitan
HUNTER VALLEY NEWS	18173	Fairfax Regional Media - Tamworth	NSW Regional
INNER WEST COURIER - CITY EDITION	39183	NewsLocal	NSW Metropolitan
INNER WEST COURIER - WEST EDITION	43081	NewsLocal	NSW Metropolitan
IPSWICH ADVERTISER	34065	APN Australian Regional Media	QLD Regional
JIMBOOMBA TIMES	21073	QLD Community Newspapers - Jimboomba Times	QLD Regional
JOONDALUP TIMES	36957	Community Newspaper Group Ltd	WA Metropolitan
JOONDALUP WEEKENDER	35727	Community Newspaper Group Ltd	WA Metropolitan
JOURNAL NEWS	12946	Star News Group	VIC Metropolitan
KALAMUNDA REPORTER	11336	Community Newspaper Group Ltd	WA Metropolitan
KIAMA INDEPENDENT	6059	Illawarra Newspapers Pty Ltd	NSW Regional
KINGBOROUGH CHRONICLE	9202	The Huon Newspaper Company Pty Ltd	Tasmania
KNOX LEADER	57799	Leader Newspaper Group	VIC Metropolitan
KWINANA COURIER	8269	Community Newspaper Group Ltd	WA Metropolitan
LATROBE VALLEY EXPRESS	36281	Latrobe Valley Express Pty Ltd	VIC Regional
LEADER MESSENGER	40054	Messenger Newspapers Pty Ltd	SA Metropolitan
LILYDALE & YARRA VALLEY LEADER	23203	Leader Newspaper Group	VIC Metropolitan
LISMORE ECHO	17810	APN Australian Regional Media	NSW Regional
LIVERPOOL CITY CHAMPION	48751	Fairfax Community Newspapers NSW	NSW Metropolitan
LIVERPOOL LEADER	47586	NewsLocal	NSW Metropolitan
LOWER HUNTER STAR	23693	Fairfax Regional Media - Maitland	NSW Regional
MACARTHUR CHRONICLE - CAMDEN EDITION	22453	NewsLocal	NSW Metropolitan
MACARTHUR CHRONICLE - CAMPBELLTOWN EDITION	48471	NewsLocal	NSW Metropolitan
MACEDON RANGES LEADER	11899	Leader Newspaper Group	VIC Metropolitan
MAILBOX SHOPPER	13829	Fairfax Regional Media - Dubbo	NSW Regional
MANDURAH COASTAL TIMES	31619	Community Newspaper Group Ltd	WA Metropolitan
MANDURAH MAIL	37397	Fairfax Regional Media - WA	WA Regional
MANLY DAILY	85346	NewsLocal	NSW Metropolitan
MANNING - GREAT LAKES EXTRA	19466	Fairfax Regional Media - Port Macquarie	NSW Regional
MANNINGHAM LEADER	43257	Leader Newspaper Group	VIC Metropolitan
MARIBYRNONG & HOBSONS BAY STAR WEEKLY	50019	MMP Star Pty Ltd	VIC Metropolitan
MARIBYRNONG LEADER	22014	Leader Newspaper Group	VIC Metropolitan
MAROOCHY & KAWANA WEEKLY	10617	APN Australian Regional Media	QLD Regional
MAROONDAH LEADER	34762	Leader Newspaper Group	VIC Metropolitan
MARYBOROUGH HERITAGE HERALD	12085	APN Australian Regional Media	QLD Regional
MELTON & MOORABOOL STAR WEEKLY	29721	MMP Star Pty Ltd	VIC Metropolitan
MELVILLE TIMES	32853	Community Newspaper Group Ltd	WA Metropolitan
MID COAST OBSERVER	20123	Fairfax Regional Media - Port Macquarie	NSW Regional
MIDLAND EXPRESS	22300	Elliott Midland Newspapers	VIC Regional
MIDLAND REPORTER	15147	Community Newspaper Group Ltd	WA Metropolitan
MIDSTATE OBSERVER	12791	Fairfax Regional Media - Orange	NSW Regional
MIDWEST TIMES INCORPORATING NORTHERN GUARDIAN	21832	West Australian Regional Newspapers Pty Ltd	WA Regional
MILDURA MIDWEEK	19985	Sunraysia Publishing Co Pty Ltd	VIC Regional
MILDURA WEEKLY	25480	Mildura Weekly Pty ltd	VIC Regional
MITCHAM & HILLS MESSENGER	25656	Messenger Newspapers Pty Ltd	SA Metropolitan
MONASH LEADER	65750	Leader Newspaper Group	VIC Metropolitan
MONTHLY CHRONICLE	54080	Adelphi Printing Pty Ltd	NSW Metropolitan
MOONEE VALLEY LEADER	43660	Leader Newspaper Group	VIC Metropolitan
MOORABBIN GLEN EIRA LEADER	18271	Leader Newspaper Group	VIC Metropolitan
MOORABBIN KINGSTON LEADER	24921	Leader Newspaper Group	VIC Metropolitan
MORDIALLOC CHELSEA LEADER	33349	Leader Newspaper Group	VIC Metropolitan
MORELAND LEADER	52188	Leader Newspaper Group	VIC Metropolitan
MORELAND LEADER - NORTHERN ED.	12751	Leader Newspaper Group	VIC Metropolitan
MORNINGTON NEWS	19880	Mornington Peninsula News Group	VIC Regional
MORNINGTON PENINSULA LEADER	38662	Leader Newspaper Group	VIC Metropolitan
MOSMAN & LOWER NORTH SHORE DAILY	34593	NewsLocal	NSW Metropolitan
MOUNTAIN VIEWS MAIL	7054	Mail Newspaper Group Pty Ltd	VIC Regional
MT DRUITT ST MARYS STANDARD	36396	NewsLocal	NSW Metropolitan
NAMBOUR WEEKLY	11038	APN Australian Regional Media	QLD Regional
NEWCASTLE WEEKLY	40385	Newstate Media Newcastle Pty Ltd	NSW Regional
NOOSA NEWS	24295	APN Australian Regional Media	QLD Regional
NORTH CENTRAL REVIEW	13493	The North Central Review Pty Ltd	VIC Regional
NORTH COAST TIMES	13921	Community Newspaper Group Ltd	WA Metropolitan
NORTH COAST WEEKENDER	11466	Community Newspaper Group Ltd	WA Metropolitan
NORTH LAKES TIMES	7821	Quest Community Newspapers	QLD Metropolitan
NORTH SHORE TIMES FRIDAY	68495	NewsLocal	NSW Metropolitan
NORTH WEST NEWS	38763	Quest Community Newspapers	QLD Metropolitan
NORTH WEST TELEGRAPH	6587	West Australian Regional Newspapers Pty Ltd	WA Regional
NORTHCOTE LEADER	18836	Leader Newspaper Group	VIC Metropolitan
NORTHERN DISTRICT TIMES	51631	NewsLocal	NSW Metropolitan
NORTHERN MESSENGER	70407	Messenger Newspapers Pty Ltd	SA Metropolitan
NORTHERN STAR WEEKLY	46146	MMP Star Pty Ltd	VIC Metropolitan
NORTHERN TERRITORY RURAL WEEKLY	9663	APN Australian Regional Media	Northern Territory
NORTHSIDE CHRONICLE	54323	Quest Community Newspapers	QLD Metropolitan
PAKENHAM NEWS	11602	Star News Group	VIC Metropolitan
PARRAMATTA ADVERTISER	76212	NewsLocal	NSW Metropolitan
PENRITH CITY GAZETTE	38601	Fairfax Community Newspapers NSW	NSW Metropolitan
PENRITH PRESS (THURSDAY)	49789	NewsLocal	NSW Metropolitan
PERTH VOICE	28324	Herald Publishing Co Pty Ltd	WA Metropolitan
PILBARA NEWS	9930	West Australian Regional Newspapers Pty Ltd	WA Regional
PINE RIVERS PRESS	29754	Quest Community Newspapers	QLD Metropolitan
PINJARRA MURRAY TIMES	5798	Community Newspaper Group Ltd	WA Metropolitan
PORT DOUGLAS & MOSSMAN GAZETTE	3732	Cairns Post Pty Ltd	QLD Regional
PORT MACQUARIE EXPRESS	23522	Fairfax Regional Media - Port Macquarie	NSW Regional
PORT PHILLIP LEADER	26024	Leader Newspaper Group	VIC Metropolitan
PORT STEPHENS EXAMINER	28953	Newcastle Newspapers Pty Ltd	NSW Regional
PORTSIDE MESSENGER	28037	Messenger Newspapers Pty Ltd	SA Metropolitan
POST	51717	Post Newspapers Pty Ltd	WA Metropolitan
PRESTON LEADER	34493	Leader Newspaper Group	VIC Metropolitan
PROGRESS LEADER	62172	Leader Newspaper Group	VIC Metropolitan
REDCLIFFE & BAYSIDE HERALD	32246	Quest Community Newspapers	QLD Metropolitan
REDLAND CITY BULLETIN	48446	Queensland Community Newspapers	QLD Regional
REVIEW PICTORIAL	22676	Torch Publishing Co Pty Ltd	NSW Metropolitan
RICHMOND RIVER EXPRESS-EXAMINER	13503	APN Australian Regional Media	NSW Regional
ROUSE HILL STANHOPE GARDENS NEWS	13335	Fairfax Community Newspapers NSW	NSW Metropolitan
ROUSE HILL TIMES	25409	NewsLocal	NSW Metropolitan
SATELLITE	42328	APN Australian Regional Media	QLD Metropolitan
SERPENTINE/JARRAHDALE EXAMINER	4099	Examiner Newspapers (WA)	WA Metropolitan
SHEPPARTON ADVISER	32030	Simtru Pty Ltd	VIC Regional
SOUND TELEGRAPH	49807	West Australian Regional Newspapers Pty Ltd	WA Regional
SOUTH EAST ADVERTISER	43877	Quest Community Newspapers	QLD Metropolitan
SOUTH WEST NEWS	45327	Quest Community Newspapers	QLD Metropolitan
SOUTHERN COURIER	45311	NewsLocal	NSW Metropolitan
SOUTHERN GAZETTE - BELMONT EDITION	10843	Community Newspaper Group Ltd	WA Metropolitan
SOUTHERN GAZETTE - SOUTH PERTH	13835	Community Newspaper Group Ltd	WA Metropolitan
SOUTHERN GAZETTE - VICTORIA PARK EDITION	7671	Community Newspaper Group Ltd	WA Metropolitan
SOUTHERN PENINSULA NEWS	14930	Mornington Peninsula News Group	VIC Regional
SOUTHERN STAR	53288	Quest Community Newspapers	QLD Metropolitan
SOUTHERN TELEGRAPH	4659	West Australian Regional Newspapers Pty Ltd	WA Regional
SOUTHERN TIMES MESSENGER	63624	Messenger Newspapers Pty Ltd	SA Metropolitan
SPRINGFIELD NEWS	10107	Quest Community Newspapers	QLD Metropolitan
ST GEORGE & SUTHERLAND SHIRE LEADER - ST GEORGE EDITION	73934	Fairfax Community Newspapers NSW	NSW Metropolitan
ST GEORGE & SUTHERLAND SHIRE LEADER - SUTHERLAND SHIRE EDITION	73705	Fairfax Community Newspapers NSW	NSW Metropolitan
ST MARYS MT DRUITT STAR	33129	Fairfax Community Newspapers NSW	NSW Metropolitan
STAR, NEWCASTLE & LAKE MACQUARIE	34144	Newcastle Newspapers Pty Ltd	NSW Regional
STIRLING TIMES	36534	Community Newspaper Group Ltd	WA Metropolitan
STONNINGTON LEADER	40542	Leader Newspaper Group	VIC Metropolitan
SUN NEWSPAPERS	23299	Nationwide News Pty Ltd	Northern Territory
SUNBURY & MACEDON RANGES STAR WEEKLY	26229	MMP Star Pty Ltd	VIC Metropolitan
SUNBURY LEADER	13957	Leader Newspaper Group	VIC Metropolitan
SURF COAST TIMES	39673	Surf Coast News Australia P/L	VIC Regional
TABLELANDER	15737	Cairns Post Pty Ltd	QLD Regional
TABLELANDS ADVERTISER	14169	Cairns Post Pty Ltd	QLD Regional
TAMWORTH CITY TIMES	14523	Fairfax Regional Media - Tamworth	NSW Regional
TASMANIAN COUNTRY	17907	Davies Brothers Limited	Tasmania
THE ADVERTISER (INCORPORATING THE LAKE TIMES)	57773	Illawarra Newspapers Pty Ltd	NSW Regional
THE BAW BAW SHIRE & WEST GIPPSLAND TRADER	16591	Warragul Regional Newspapers Ltd	VIC Regional
THE CITY	44500	Messenger Newspapers Pty Ltd	SA Metropolitan
THE ECHO	38761	Geelong Advertiser Pty Ltd	VIC Regional
THE FREE PRESS	2333	The North Central Review Pty Ltd	VIC Regional
THE LOGAN REPORTER	47149	APN Australian Regional Media	QLD Metropolitan
THE MIDWEEK	12204	APN Australian Regional Media	QLD Regional
THE MOORABOOL NEWS	12000	The Ballan News	VIC Regional
THE SUN PARRAMATTA HOLROYD	37982	Fairfax Community Newspapers NSW	NSW Metropolitan
THE WEEKLY REVIEW BAYSIDE	69045	Metro Media Publishing	VIC Metropolitan
THE WEEKLY REVIEW CITY	24500	Metro Media Publishing	VIC Metropolitan
THE WEEKLY REVIEW EASTERN	82713	Metro Media Publishing	VIC Metropolitan
THE WEEKLY REVIEW GREATER GEELONG	72806	Metro Media Publishing	VIC Regional
THE WEEKLY REVIEW IVANHOE & VALLEY	68797	Metro Media Publishing	VIC Metropolitan
THE WEEKLY REVIEW MELBOURNE TIMES	76798	Metro Media Publishing	VIC Metropolitan
THE WEEKLY REVIEW MOONEE VALLEY	53585	Metro Media Publishing	VIC Metropolitan
THE WEEKLY REVIEW SOUTH-EAST	51772	Metro Media Publishing	VIC Metropolitan
THE WEEKLY REVIEW STONNINGTON & BOROONDARA	115971	Metro Media Publishing	VIC Metropolitan
TWEED DAILY NEWS COMMUNITY EDITION	26862	APN Australian Regional Media	NSW Regional
WANNEROO TIMES	21004	Community Newspaper Group Ltd	WA Metropolitan
WANNEROO WEEKENDER	16136	Community Newspaper Group Ltd	WA Metropolitan
WARWICK & SOUTHERN DOWNS WEEKLY	11869	APN Australian Regional Media	QLD Regional
WEEKEND COURIER	35292	Community Newspaper Group Ltd	WA Metropolitan
WEEKLY ADVERTISER	22524	Ace Radio	VIC Regional
WEEKLY TIMES	53771	Weekly Times	NSW Metropolitan
WEEKLY TIMES MESSENGER	61700	Messenger Newspapers Pty Ltd	SA Metropolitan
WENTWORTH COURIER	48577	NewsLocal	NSW Metropolitan
WESTERN PORT NEWS	11980	Mornington Peninsula News Group	VIC Regional
WESTERN SUBURBS WEEKLY	46618	Community Newspaper Group Ltd	WA Metropolitan
WESTERN TIMES (BATHURST)	10724	Fairfax Regional Media - Orange	NSW Regional
WESTERN WEEKENDER	58135	Western Sydney Publishing Group	NSW Metropolitan
WESTSIDE NEWS	45155	Quest Community Newspapers	QLD Metropolitan
WHITEHORSE LEADER	59379	Leader Newspaper Group	VIC Metropolitan
WHITSUNDAY TIMES	7004	APN Australian Regional Media	QLD Regional
WHITTLESEA LEADER	50658	Leader Newspaper Group	VIC Metropolitan
WHITTLESEA REVIEW	1300	The North Central Review Pty Ltd	VIC Regional
WOLLONDILLY ADVERTISER	11788	Fairfax Community Newspapers NSW	NSW Metropolitan
WYNDHAM STAR WEEKLY	46124	MMP Star Pty Ltd	VIC Metropolitan
WYNNUM HERALD	31563	Quest Community Newspapers	QLD Metropolitan

== Top 25 newspapers in Australia in early 2010 ==
This is a list of the top 25 newspapers in the Australia by Monday–Friday or Monday–Saturday circulation for the three-month period ending 30 June 2010. These figures were released by The Newspaper Works, a trade organization.

Newspaper	City	State/ Territory	Circulation	Owner
Herald Sun	Melbourne	Victoria	515,500	News Corp
The Daily Telegraph	Sydney	New South Wales	374,395	News Corp
The Courier-Mail	Brisbane	Queensland	216,638	News Corp
The Sydney Morning Herald	Sydney	New South Wales	207,013	Nine Entertainment
The West Australian	Perth	Western Australia	203,304	Seven West Media
The Age	Melbourne	Victoria	197,500	Nine Entertainment
The Advertiser	Adelaide	South Australia	180,091	News Corp
The Australian	Sydney	New South Wales	135,115	News Corp
The Australian Financial Review	Melbourne	Victoria	77,046	Nine Entertainment
The Herald	Newcastle	New South Wales	49,300	Australian Community Media
The Mercury	Hobart	Tasmania	45,339	News Corp
The Gold Coast Bulletin	Gold Coast	Queensland	38,728	News Corp
The Canberra Times	Canberra	Australian Capital Territory	32,706	Australian Community Media
The Examiner	Launceston	Tasmania	31,947	Australian Community Media
Illawarra Mercury	Wollongong	New South Wales	27,057	Australian Community Media
Townsville Bulletin	Townsville	Queensland	26,395	News Corp
Geelong Advertiser	Geelong	Victoria	25,955	News Corp
The Cairns Post	Cairns	Queensland	25,758	News Corp
The Border Mail	Albury / Wodonga	Victoria	24,729	Australian Community Media
The Advocate	Burnie	Tasmania	23,488	Australian Community Media
The Toowoomba Chronicle	Toowoomba	Queensland	22,932	News Corp
Northern Territory News	Darwin	Northern Territory	20,562	News Corp
Sunshine Coast Daily	Maroochydore	Queensland	20,259	News Corp
The Courier	Ballarat	Victoria	18,860	Australian Community Media
The Morning Bulletin	Rockhampton	Queensland	17,702	News Corp

== See also ==
- Lists of newspapers
- List of newspapers in Australia
- Newspaper circulation
- Newspapers in Australia
- List of newspapers by circulation

== Sources ==
- http://www.presscouncil.org.au/uploads/52321/state-of-the-news-print-media-2008.pdf
- https://mumbrella.com.au/afr-circulation-falls-while-famous-enjoys-35-boost-11721
- https://mumbrella.com.au/why-you-might-not-want-to-book-newspaper-ads-in-melbourne-for-tuesdays-64601
- https://web.archive.org/web/20110722033436/http://media.crikey.com.au/wp-content/uploads/2010/11/circulation.pdf
- https://web.archive.org/web/20131208053344/http://www.adnews.com.au/files/dmfile/ABCNEWS.pdf (Sep qtr, 2013)
- https://mumbrella.com.au/abcs-australian-slides-100000-copies-first-time-389108
- https://mumbrella.com.au/abcs-newspapers-march-2016-australian-afr-fairfax-news-366400
- https://mumbrella.com.au/abcs-age-sees-digital-subscriptions-slide-australian-nearly-doubles-afr-print-sales-345756
- https://mumbrella.com.au/abcs-newspapers-3-188553
- http://www.adnews.com.au/abc-the-austrian-sees-increase#l56PBIotCwB1O07d.99
- http://www.adnews.com.au/news/abc-figures-newspaper-sales-continue-to-fall-but-can-digital-save-the-day
- https://mumbrella.com.au/abcs-fairfax-medias-weekly-titles-continue-decline-australian-grows-digital-subscribers-407573
