= Baskette =

Baskette is the surname of the following people:

- Billy Baskette (1884–1949), American pianist and composer
- Jim Baskette (1887–1942), American Major League Baseball pitcher
- Lina Basquette (Lena Copeland Baskette) (1907-1994), American film actress
- Michael Baskette, American music producer

== See also ==
- Baskett (surname)
- Basket (disambiguation)
