= Australian Commercial Television Code of Practice =

The Australian Commercial Television Industry Code of Practice is a self-regulatory code adopted by free-to-air broadcasters in the Australian media. Although developed by industry, the code has been registered (as the regulatory regime permits) with the Australian Communications and Media Authority (ACMA).

The Code was developed by Free TV Australia, an industry body which represents Australia's commercial free-to-air broadcast networks and stations and is put under review triennially.

== Description ==
FreeTV Australia's website describes the Code as being an attempt "to balance and provide for the various and often conflicting interests of our diverse society in the delivery of commercial television services. It is the result of extensive consultation with Government advisory bodies, community interest groups and the public generally."

Commercial television networks in Australia are required to comply with the Australian Commercial Television Code of Practice, which is governed by the Australian Communications and Media Authority with Free TV Australia mediating between the networks and ACMA, as well as handling viewer complaints. Classifications for each program broadcast on TV, are decided upon by trained classification officers at each network. If viewers believe a network has breached the TV Code of Practice (an incorrect classification has been given, for example), viewers can submit a complaint to Free TV Australia, who then submit that complaint to the network. If viewers are dissatisfied with the result, they may then refer their complaint to the ACMA for an investigation.

== Content ==
The Code covers the matters prescribed in section 123 of the Broadcasting Services Act 1992 and other matters relating to program content that are of concern to the community including:

- program classifications;
- accuracy, fairness and respect for privacy in news and current affairs;
- advertising time on television, and
- placement of commercials and program promotions and complaints handling.

The Code operates alongside the ACMA Standards which regulates programs for children and the Australian content of programs and advertisements.

== Television content rating system ==
=== Child-specific ratings ===
These time zones are further governed by the Australian Commercial Television Code of Practice, over and above the commercial Code of Practice. Both are similar to the G and PG classifications, respectively, in terms of allowable content, but are specifically targeted at children, whereas G specifies programming content that is suitable for all audiences, but may not necessarily be of interest to children. Until 2020, commercial free-to-air stations were obligated to broadcast a set number of hours of content per year. These quotas were removed in October 2020, leaving broadcasters with no requirement to air programs specifically aimed at children.

| Symbol | Abbreviation | Name | Description |
|---|---|---|---|
| P-rated (pink) | P | Preschoolers | Programs deemed to specifically meet the educational needs and interests of preschool children who have not yet started school. P-rated content must be broadcast between 7 am and 4:30 pm, Monday to Friday. P-classified programs must be broadcast without any advertisements. No prizes may be awarded or given, and programs and advertisements must not carry endorsements for commercial products. |
| C-rated (orange) | C | Children | Programs deemed to specifically meet the educational needs and interests of children of school age who are 14 years or younger. C-rated content must be broadcast between 7 a.m. and 8:30 a.m. or between 4 p.m. and 8:30 p.m on weekdays or 7 a.m. and 8:30 p.m. on weekends and school holidays. Each 30 minute broadcast of a C-classified program may not contain more than six minute and 30 seconds of appropriate advertising. Programs and advertisements must not carry endorsements for commercial products. |

=== Standard ratings ===
The Australian television content rating system is intended to be equivalent to the Australian Classification Board (ACB) classifications, albeit with some minor alterations. They're usually presented with the same shape and sometimes colour as their ACB counterparts. The two government-owned TV networks, ABC and SBS, are not bound by the same regulations as their commercial counterparts, and are, instead, each bound by their own Codes of Practice.

The guidelines provided by these Codes are similar but not identical to the Codes of Practice for commercial stations. For example, SBS referred to the rating MAV 15+ instead of AV 15+, while ABC did not use the AV/MAV rating at all; instead, programs rated MA 15+ did not start before 9:30 p.m., instead of 9:00 p.m. While the ABC recognizes the G rating, its code of practice does not require that it display its classification symbol on-air in respect to G-rated programming.

From December 2015, the ACMA introduced sweeping changes to the ratings system for commercial networks. Among them were allowing M and MA 15+ programs to air an hour earlier then they were previously allowed, from 7:30 pm and 8:30 pm respectively, PG programs can air all day, dissolving the AV 15+ classification, as well as changes to when adverts with higher classifications program can air. R 18+ and X 18+ restricted classifications are not permitted for free-to-air broadcast in Australia. Many R 18+ movies on DVD/Blu-ray are often edited on Free TV/cable networks, to secure an MA 15+ classification or lower. Some movies that were classified R 18+ on DVD have since been aired on Australian TV with an MA 15+ classification.

Pay television networks also have a different system to the free-to-air networks. In general, all content on pay TV must still be given one of the above ratings; however, there are not usually restrictions on the time of day any particular programming can be broadcast. There is no R 18+ rating for pay TV, but its use is strictly limited to special interest channels. FOXTEL, a pay TV company, has a parental lock-out system which can be programmed by parents to stop children from seeing certain programs. In 2009, the system malfunctioned, allowing children access to violent TV shows and films. The restrictions on R 18+ rated programming have been increased since then, and those programs can now only be shown on the two adult channels.

| Symbol | Abbreviation | Name | Description |
|---|---|---|---|
| G-rated (green) | G | General | General exhibition, suitable for all ages but not necessarily intended for young children and may be aimed at older children or adults. Content is VERY MILD in impact. G content may air at any time of day.: Violence: Depiction of violence must be brief and very mild. Use of weapons and taunting language must be only slightly menacing and infrequent, and justified by context. Harmful imitable behaviour should not be encouraged, but can be depicted if necessary to context.; Sex/nudity: Depiction of sexual behaviour, and sexual references, should contain little or no detail. Brief and infrequent nudity when really essential may be permitted if justified by context.; Language: Very mild offensive and discriminatory language may be used scarcely when justified by context.; Drugs: Scenes depicting illicit drug use or references to them must be necessary and justified by the program's context.; Themes: Thematic material about social and domestic struggles must not be very threatening to children and must be justified by context. Brief and mild reference to suicide is permitted provided that it is not encouraged. |
| PG-rated (yellow) | PG | Parental Guidance Recommended | Parental guidance is recommended for young viewers. (Note: On ABC, the voiced-over board specifies the age by saying "parental guidance is recommended for persons under 15 years". Other channels' voiced-over boards have referred to "young viewers" instead.) Content contains depictions or references which may be confusing or upsetting to children without adult guidance. Content is MILD in impact; Elements in these programs may require parental supervision for young children. PG content may air at any time of the day since December 2015.: Violence: Depiction of violence must be mild and contained. More moderate amount of stylised violence, rather than realistic violence, is permitted.; Sex/nudity: Depiction of sexual behaviour and sexual references must be infrequent and intermittent. Brief nudity is permitted when justified by the story's context.; Language: Mild offensive language may be used infrequently.; Drugs: Mild illicit drug use or references to them must be justified by the program's context and they must not be promoted.; Themes: Social and domestic thematic elements can be directed for mature audiences, but still must be mild in impact. Supernatural and mild horror themes are permitted. Reference to suicide or attempted suicide is permitted provided that it is mild and brief, and isn't encouraged as being normal. |
| M-rated (lime) | M | Mature | Recommended only for viewing by mature audiences. (Note: On ABC, the board narrator specifies the age by saying "recommended for people aged 15 years and over"; SBS also did the same before voiced-over boards were cancelled. Other channels' voiced-over boards said "recommends viewing by mature audiences".) May contain material that is potentially harmful or disturbing to those under 15 years. Content is MODERATE in impact; These programs may require a mature perspective and are deemed not suitable for all children. M content may only be broadcast between 7:30 p.m. and 6:00 a.m. on any day, and additionally between 12:00 p.m. and 3:00 p.m. on school days.: Violence: Depiction of violence can be realistic if it is infrequent, not gratuitous, and is especially justified by context. It should also not be presented in a positive manner. Reference to sexual violence, or its depiction, must be brief and not frequent, and justified by the story's context.; Sex/nudity: Depiction of sexual activity, and sexual references, must be infrequent and not be detailed. Nudity is permitted when justified by the story's context, but must not be explicit during sex scene.; Language: Offensive language may be used and must not be aggressive and frequent, unless when justified by context.; Drugs: Depiction of drug use is permitted, but it must not be shown in explicit detail and be encouraged.; Themes: Most thematic elements are permitted, but more strong themes should be justified by context. |
| MA15+-rated (red) | MA 15+ | Mature Audiences (Note: In the 1990s and 2000s, MA stood for 'Mature Adult' on channels such as Prime7 and ABC. Further, the Australian Classification Board MA's abbreviation stands for 'Mature Accompanied'.) | Not suitable for people under 15. Content is STRONG in impact; It is advised people under the age of 15 do not view these programs, due to the strength of the elements within. MA 15+ programming may only be broadcast between 8:30 p.m. and 6:00 a.m. on any given day. Consumer advice is mandatory.: Violence: Graphic violence is permitted if it isn't prolonged or extremely gory, unless if justified by context. Sexual violence must not be detailed, should be brief and justified by the story.; Sex/nudity: Depiction of strong simulated sex alongside nudity is permitted if justified by context. Exploitative and degrading sexual activity, including non-consenting sex, is prohibited.; Language: Very offensive language may be used if it is not too frequent.; Drugs: Depiction of drug use is permitted, but it must not be shown in explicit detail and be encouraged.; Themes: Strong thematic elements are permitted, but more stronger themes should be justified by context. Suicide methods should not be depicted in graphic detail. |
| AV15+-rated (purple) | AV 15+ | Adult Violence; No longer used | Not suitable for people under 15. The category dealt with content or contain depictions that require a more mature perspective. Violence was STRONG in impact; this classification was the same as MA 15+, except renamed "Adult Violence". This category was used specifically for extremely violent programming. The AV classification was only allowed to exceed MA 15+ content on the basis of violence, where MA 15+ material could contain "some violence". AV 15+ material could carry advisory warnings for "frequent violence" or "strong violence". AV 15+ content may only be broadcast between 9:30 p.m. and 5:00 a.m. on any day. Consumer advice was mandatory. The AV 15+ classification was abolished after 30 November 2015. Strong impact violence is now incorporated into the MA 15+ classification. |

Adult "Pay Per View" only

| Symbol | Abbreviation | Name | Description |
|---|---|---|---|
| | R 18+ | Restricted R 18+ | Not for anyone under 18; this is limited to Adult "Pay Per View" VC 196 and 197, access to these programs is locked by a personal password. Content may include prolonged scenes of intense violence, sexual situations, coarse language and strong drug use. |
| | X 18+ | Restricted X 18+ | Contains material that is pornographic in nature. No one under 18 may legally rent, buy, possess, exhibit, hire, or view these programs, on television, DVD, or otherwise. The exhibition or sale of these programs to people under the age of 18 years is a criminal offence carrying a maximum fine of $5,500. |
| | E | Exempt | Exempt from classification; Only very specific types of material can be exempt from classification and the material cannot contain anything that exceeds the constraints of the PG classification. These include news and current affairs, sports broadcasting, education videos and certain documentaries. Many complaints have been handled before, however, regarding LIVE broadcasts. |

=== Consumer advice ===
Consumer advice is compulsory for all MA 15+ and one-off programs, as well as very short series classified M or higher (such as feature films, miniseries and documentaries). Commercial networks have been providing consumer advice to all PG and M programs, anyway. From February 2019, the Nine Network, the Seven Network, Network 10, SBS and Foxtel, along with regional networks Prime7, GWN7, WIN Television, and NBN Television, no longer use full-screen and voiced-over boards before the beginning of programs, instead opting for small text boxes in the bottom right-hand corner (Nine and WIN) or top left-hand corner (SBS, GWN7, Prime7, Seven and 10), though ABC and some Foxtel channels continue to use full-screen and voiced-over boards before the start of programs.

Consumer advice takes the form of a full-screen written and verbal announcement at the start of the program, announcing the classification, as well as listing the type and strength and/or frequency of any classifiable element. When a program carries consumer advice, the appropriate abbreviations in letter form are displayed along with the classification symbol after each commercial break. They also usually appear in programming guides, usually in lower case to distinguish from primary classifications. In general, these abbreviations are as follows:

- A – used for programs with adult themes;
  - strong adult themes
  - medical procedures
  - crude humour
  - sexual violence
  - suicide themes
  - war scenes
- V – used for programs depicting violence;
  - stylised violence
  - mild violence
  - some violence
  - frequent violence
  - realistic violence
  - strong violence
- L – used for programs coarse language;
  - mild coarse language
  - some coarse language
  - frequent coarse language
  - very coarse language
  - frequent very coarse language
- S – used for programs depicting simulated sex scenes and/or references;
  - sexual references
  - a sex scene
  - sex scenes
  - strong sex scenes
- H – used for programs containing horror or supernatural themes;
- D – used for programs with drug references and/or use;
  - drug references
  - drug use
- N – used for programs containing nudity;

Previously, abbreviations such as MP (medical procedures) and SN (supernatural themes) have been used.

== See also ==
- Advertising Standards Bureau (Australia)
- Australian Classification Board
