= Bruce Baskett =

Australian journalist

Bruce Baskett is an Australian journalist who was the last editor of The Herald from 1989 until it was merged with its morning sister paper The Sun News-Pictorial in 1990. Upon the merger, Baskett was appointed the first editor of the new Herald-Sun. Although he later left The Herald and Weekly Times, Baskett continues to contribute to articles for the Herald Sun upon the deaths of old Herald, Sun, and Herald Sun colleagues.
