= National Women's Media Centre =

The National Women’s Media Centre is a defunct Australian women’s organisation dedicated to the development of a media ethic within Australia which assumes the equality of women and men in all aspects of its operations.

The NWMC operated from 1989 to 2003 with branches in all Australian States and Territories with the exception of the Northern Territory. Before its final incarnation as the National Women’s Media Centre, the organisation was known as MediaSwitch, and was established to monitor and improve the portrayal of women in the media. As of 2003, the organisation ceased operations after more than a decade of campaigning for women’s rights.

== Resources and campaigns ==
Aside from the issue of women’s rights and portrayals in the media, the National Women’s Media Centre also lent its weight to various political, media and socio-economic campaigns such as the ‘Support the ABC’, ‘Free Tibet’, and the ‘Net Censorship’ campaigns.

The organisation had also previously released resources to empower women in managing the media and its impact on their lives. These resources included tips on how to write letters to the editor, a how-to guide on lodging complaints about issues in the media, contact lists for the various media sources and federal politicians, a guide on handling interviews and an activists’ handbook called Lobbying Made Easy.

Also provided was a paid media release scheme known as Media Assist, where the National Women’s Media Centre could be engaged to provide services in planning media and public relations campaigns.

== Advertising standards ==
The organisation lobbied extensively as a representative of women’s interests in negotiations between the Government, the advertising industry and consumers regarding the establishment of a new Advertising Standards system. The main intention was to persuade the Government to intervene in order to regulate an industry where the organisation viewed there was a lack of access and attention to the issues of importance to women.

In October 1997, the organisation launched the Advertising Complaints Hotline as a means of providing an accessible outlet of complaint for women feeling aggrieved about sexualized advertising campaigns. The main aims of this action were to:

- Keep a register of the complaints to develop an overview of women’s opinions about advertising and to monitor which complaints are being addressed by the new industry regulation systems and which are being rejected.
- Assist women in framing their complaints in line with the codes.
- Forward relevant complaints to the advertising industry’s regulatory system, the media carriers, and relevant members of parliament.

== Global Media Monitoring Project ==
The first Global Media Monitoring Project was an imitative of the 1994 Women and Media Conference in Bangkok which was undertaken by Mediawatch Canada and executed in 1995 with the participation of seventy-one countries. The report was launched at the Beijing Women’s Forum.

The second Global Media Monitoring Project was proposed at the 1997 Women and Communication Policy Forum in Manila and the National Women’s Media Centre was to co-ordinate the project in partnership with Deakin University and Mediawatch Canada.

== Timeline ==
- 1902: Australia becomes the second country in the world to grant women the vote.
- 1960: Resurgence of the feminist movement is accompanied by a critique of the portrayal of women in popular culture.
- 1975: The South Australian parliament passes the first sex discrimination act in Australia (The Sex)
- 1981: A survey by the Office of the Status of Women reveals that women find advertising offensive when it stereotypes women’s roles and occupations, patronises or insults women, and uses women as sex objects.
- 1982: Advertising industry research (Bartos 1982; Clemenger 1984) concludes that Australian advertisers need to change negative and outdated portrayals of women.
- 1983: The Office of the Status of Women publishes Fair Exposure: Guidelines For The constructive and Positive Portrayal and Presentation of Women in The Media.
- 1983: The Women’s Electoral Lobby submits guidelines covering sexual discrimination (or sexism) in advertising codes of practice.
- 1984: The federal Parliament passes the Sex Discrimination Act 1984. It adopts the provisions of The United Nations Convention on the Elimination of all Forms of Discrimination Against Women.
- 1984: The Australian Broadcasting Tribunal establishes a committee on the status of women which disbands the following year.
- 1985: The Media Council of Australia applies to the Trade Practices Commission for authorisation of advertising codes but loses on appeal.
- 1986: The Human Rights and Equal Opportunity Commission is established.
- 1986: National Agenda consultations by the Office of the Status of Women reveal that Australian women want more realistic and positive images of women in the media. Over one third of 26,000 women surveyed object to negative portrayals, particularly those which trivialise and sexually objectify women.
- 1987: The Federal government announces its intention to conduct an investigation into the portrayal of women in the media.
- 1987: The Office of the Status of Women commissions content analysis studies on the sex role portrayal of women in advertising (Saulwick, Weller and Associates, 1987; Sally Hartnett and Associates, 1988) Findings show that women in Australian advertisements are typically young, white and attractive and that they are portrayed in a narrow range of non-authoritative and stereotypical roles
- 1987: A telephone survey of 1002 women by the Office of the Status of Women indicates that the portrayal of women in advertisements is a concern to Australian women of all ages and social backgrounds.
- 1988: Public Forum is held, which leads to the establishment of the National Working Party on the Portrayal of Women in the Media. The objective of the working party is to achieve a more fair and accurate portrayal of women in the media.
- 1989: MediaSwitch, a national organization to monitor and improve the portrayal of women in the media, is established.
- 1990: Communicating to Women in the 90’s, an advertising industry workshop is held in Sydney.
- 1990: The Women and Advertising: Reference Dictionary is published by the Office of the Status of Women.
- 1991: Women and Advertising Resource Package is released by the National Working Party on the Portrayal of Women in the Media.
- 1991: MediaSwitch branch is established in Queensland.
- 1992: Qualitative study by Consumer Contact finds that women object to media portrayals which objectify or depict ‘unintelligent’ women.
- 1993: Women and Media, a result of a national content analysis study by Media Insight on the portrayal of women in news and current affairs is released by the National Working Party on the Portrayal of Women in the Media.
- 1993: Southdown Research Services publishes a report showing that 62% of women think the media does not accurately reflect the lives of women in the 90’s.
- 1994: The National Women’s Media Centre is established in Sydney.
- 1995: The Global Media Monitoring Project reveals that women are still negatively portrayed and under-represented in both Australian and international media.
- 1995: Guidelines for the Portrayal of Women in Public Sector Advertisements and Publications is published by the Queensland Government.
- 1996: Breaking the Mould: Beyond Media Images, a resource package promoting critical analysis of the portrayal of women in the media is published by MediaSwitch (QLD).
