= James Newton Baskett =

American writer and zoologist known for science and historical works

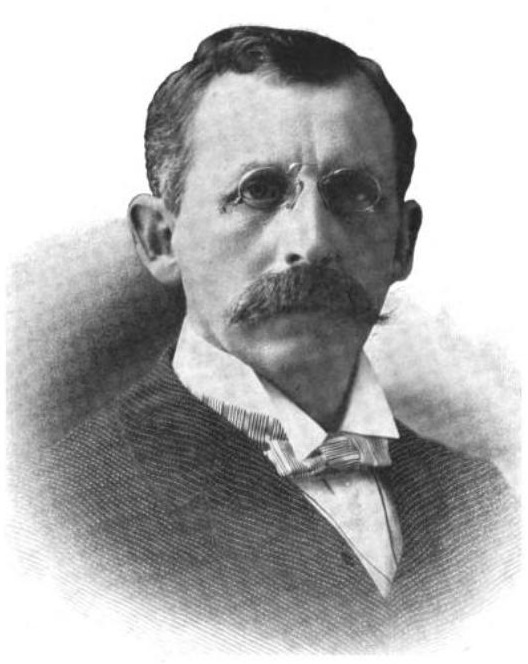

James Newton Baskett (1 November 1849 – 14 June 1925) was an American zoologist and popular science writer. He also wrote several short novels apart from some historical studies.

== Life and work ==
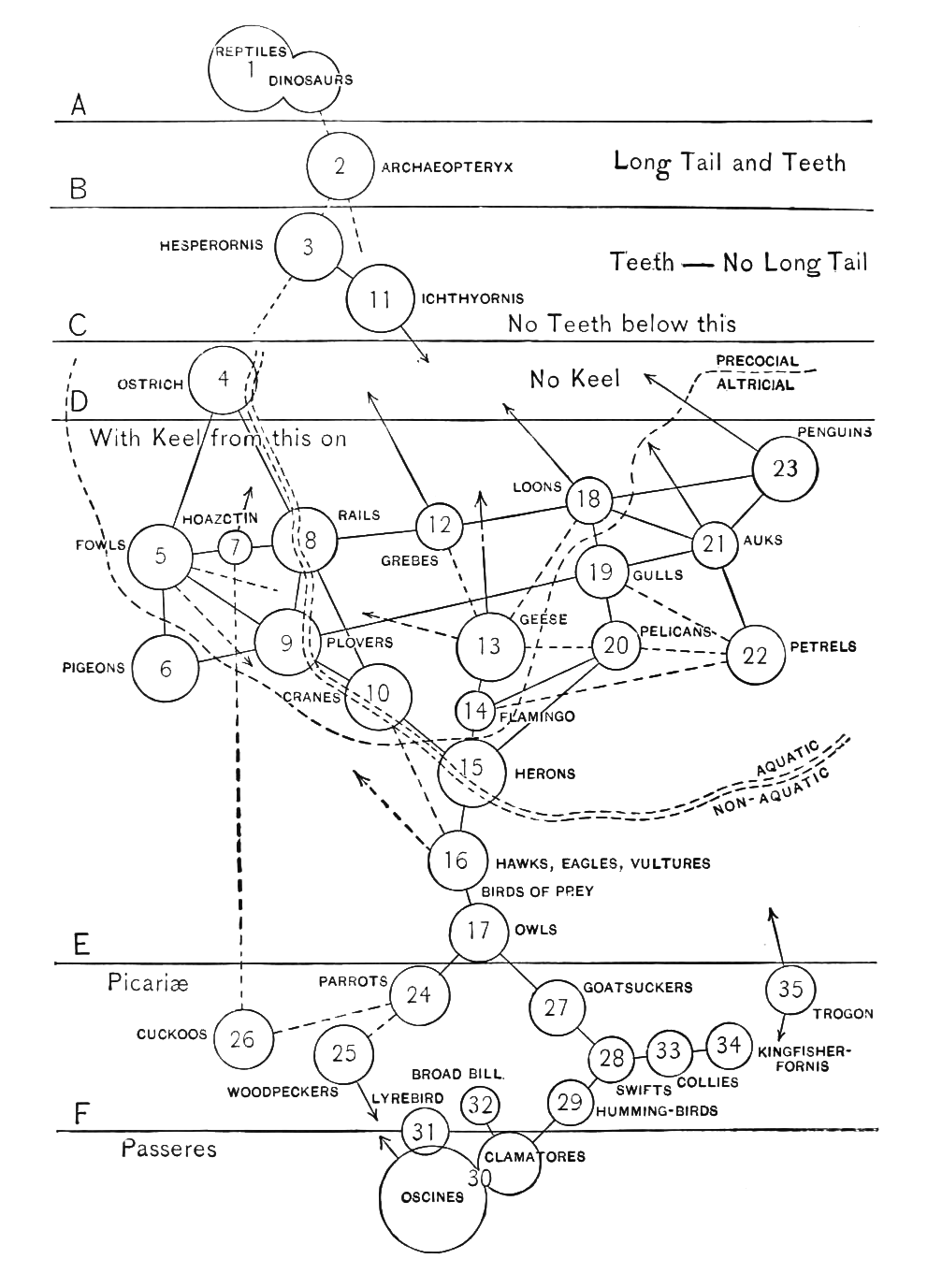
Evolutionary bird relationships, 1897

Baskett was born in Nicholas County, Kentucky and studied at the University of Missouri. He received a doctorate in 1872 and an honorary AM degree in 1893. In 1893 he also presented a study of the evolutionary relationships of birds based on their eggs at the ornithological congress held in Chicago. He worked as a surveyor and engineer and wrote articles on nature in various magazines. He lived in Missouri for most of his life, taking an interest in nature as well as history. He wrote several popular book including:

- The Story of the Birds (1896)
- The Story of the Fishes (1899)
- The Story of Amphibians and Reptiles (1902)
- At You-Alls House (1898)
- As the Light Led (1900)
- Sweet Briar and Thistledown (1902)
- A study of the route of Coronado between the Rio Grande and Missouri rivers (1912)
- Whispers from Nature (1920)

In 1907 he wrote on the route taken by Cabeza de Vaca. He moved along with his wife to live in Mexico, Missouri. They returned to live in St. Louis in 1910. In 1913, his wife (married 1874) Jeannie Morrison, a music teacher, daughter of surgeon Douglas Morrison, died. After her death he moved back to Mexico where he died.
