= Ann Baskett =

British actress

Ann Baskett, actress, (1928–2020), RADA scholar, starred in the 1952 BBC production of Pride and Prejudice by Jane Austen opposite Peter Cushing. This was a 5-part mini-series and was transmitted live, requiring theatre-like timing and TV production techniques which were the most advanced of the time, as the players followed their cues to appear in up to five theatre sets in succession. After having a family, Ann took up painting and has exhibited at the Royal Society of Miniature Painters Sculptors and Gravers. She also worked as a theatre critic using her married name, Ann St Clair-Stannard.

== Filmography ==
Year	Title	Role	Notes
1951	Sweethearts and Wives		TV film
1952	Pride and Prejudice	Jane Bennet	Mini-series
1952	How Does It End?	Rose Red	Episode: "What Katy Did"
