= Convergence Review =

The Convergence review was an initiative by the Australian government to examine the future of media and communications in Australia. Along with the Finkelstein inquiry, the Convergence review was one of the most significant reviews of Australian media policy in recent years. The Finkelstein inquiry was ordered by the Federal Government in reaction to the UK's phone-hacking controversy and the subsequent Leveson Review and Convergence Review was asked to consider its findings. The final Convergence Review report was released in 2012.

== Background and report ==
The Convergence review focused on three areas: media ownership and control, content standards and promoting locally produced content. The Convergence Review's Final Report suggested a move away from platform regulation, to a framework which focussed on the size and relevance of content entities. It also suggested changes to media ownership rules, content regulation and Australian content. The committee was chaired by Glen Boreham, former managing director of IBM Australia and New Zealand. It included board member and international digital executive Louise McElvogue who has worked in the UK, US and Australia and former managing director of SBS and deputy managing director of ABC, Malcolm Long.

== Reception ==
As noted in The Conversation: "Media owners have always, in response to inquiry recommendations, run campaigns against any suggestion that their right to carry out their business as and how they see fit should be tampered with." The review sparked strong reactions from media entities.

News Corp executive Kim Williams accused the then ruling Labor government of using the review as 'political payback' while Foxtel chief executive Richard Freudenstein expressed concern over the powers of the new regulators. Other commentators argued that the reforms were needed in order to respond to the changing media environment. The review "proposes an entirely different philosophy of media regulation...one in which politicians don't make the key decisions about media ownership through law, merely identify the broad principles of what they want achieved and leave it to an independent regulator to accomplish". The then communications minister Stephen Conroy responded to the criticism by saying that "These reforms will ensure for the Australian public a media sector that is fair, diverse, and able to tackle the challenges of the future".
