= Basket Dome =

Granite dome in Yosemite National Park, USA

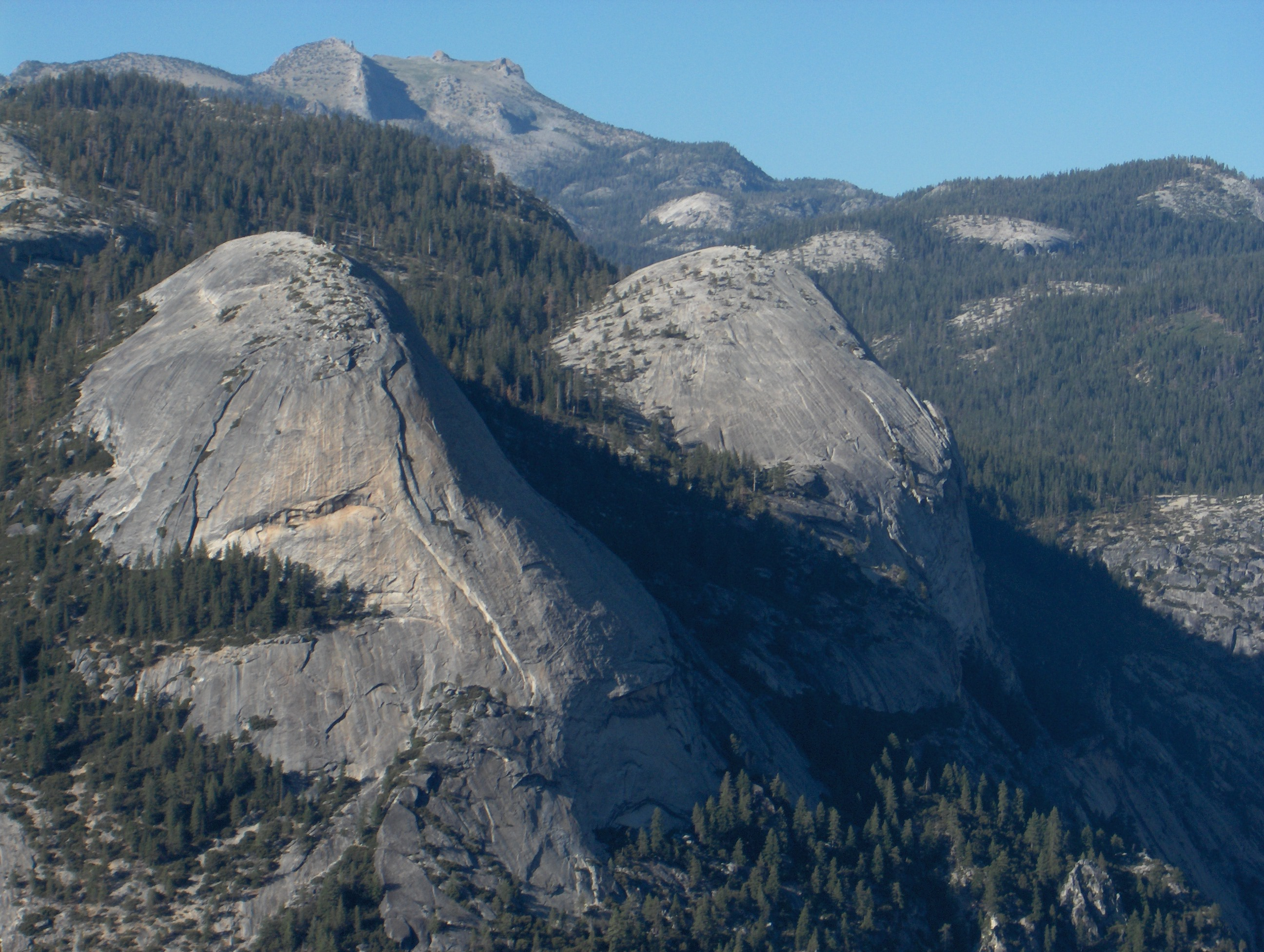
- Basket Dome to the right of North Dome

Highest point
- Elevation: 7,612 ft (2,320 m) NGVD 29
- Prominence: 212 ft (65 m)
- Coordinates: 37°45′49″N 119°33′03″W

Geography
- Location within California Location within the United States
- Location: Mariposa County, California, U.S.
- Parent range: Sierra Nevada
- Topo map: USGS Yosemite Falls

Basket Dome is a granite dome in Yosemite National Park, United States.

Basket Dome was named from a Native American legend involving a woman carrying a basket, who was turned by anger into stone, forming the dome.
