= Herald Sun =

Newspaper in Victoria, Australia, founded 1840

- Herald Sun front page 12 December 2005, reporting on the 2005 Cronulla riots
- Type: Daily newspaper
- Format: Tabloid
- Owner: The Herald and Weekly Times (News Corp Australia)
- Editor: Sam Weir
- Founded: The Port Phillip Herald (3 January 1840); The Melbourne Morning Herald (1 January 1849); The Melbourne Herald (1 January 1855); The Herald (8 September 1855); The Sun News-Pictorial (11 September 1922); The Herald Sun (8 October 1990)
- Political alignment: Centre-right (Coalition (federal), Victorian Liberal Party and Victorian National Party)
- Headquarters: The Herald and Weekly Times Tower, 40 City Road, Southbank, Victoria, Australia (formerly The Herald and Weekly Times Building, 44-74 Flinders Street, Melbourne, Victoria, Australia from 1990 to 1995)
- Website: www.heraldsun.com.au

The Herald Sun, including its Sunday edition, Sunday Herald Sun is a 7-day daily conservative tabloid newspaper based in Melbourne, Australia, published by The Herald and Weekly Times, a subsidiary of News Corp Australia, itself a subsidiary of the American Murdoch owned News Corp. The Herald Sun primarily serves Melbourne and the state of Victoria and shares many articles with other News Corporation daily newspapers, especially those from Australia.

It is also available for purchase in Tasmania, the Australian Capital Territory and border regions of South Australia and southern New South Wales such as the Riverina and the South Coast, and is available digitally through its website and apps. In 2017, the paper had a daily circulation of 350,000 from Monday to Friday.

The Herald Sun newspaper is the product of a merger in 1990 of two newspapers owned by The Herald and Weekly Times Limited: the morning tabloid paper The Sun News-Pictorial and the afternoon broadsheet paper The Herald. It was first published on 8 October 1990 as the Herald-Sun.

== History ==
=== The Herald ===
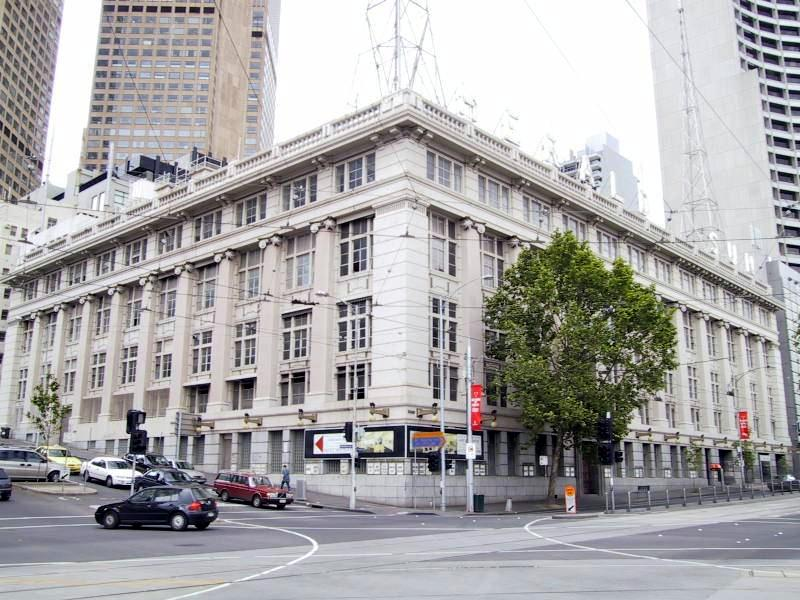
The old Herald and Weekly Times building in Flinders Street.

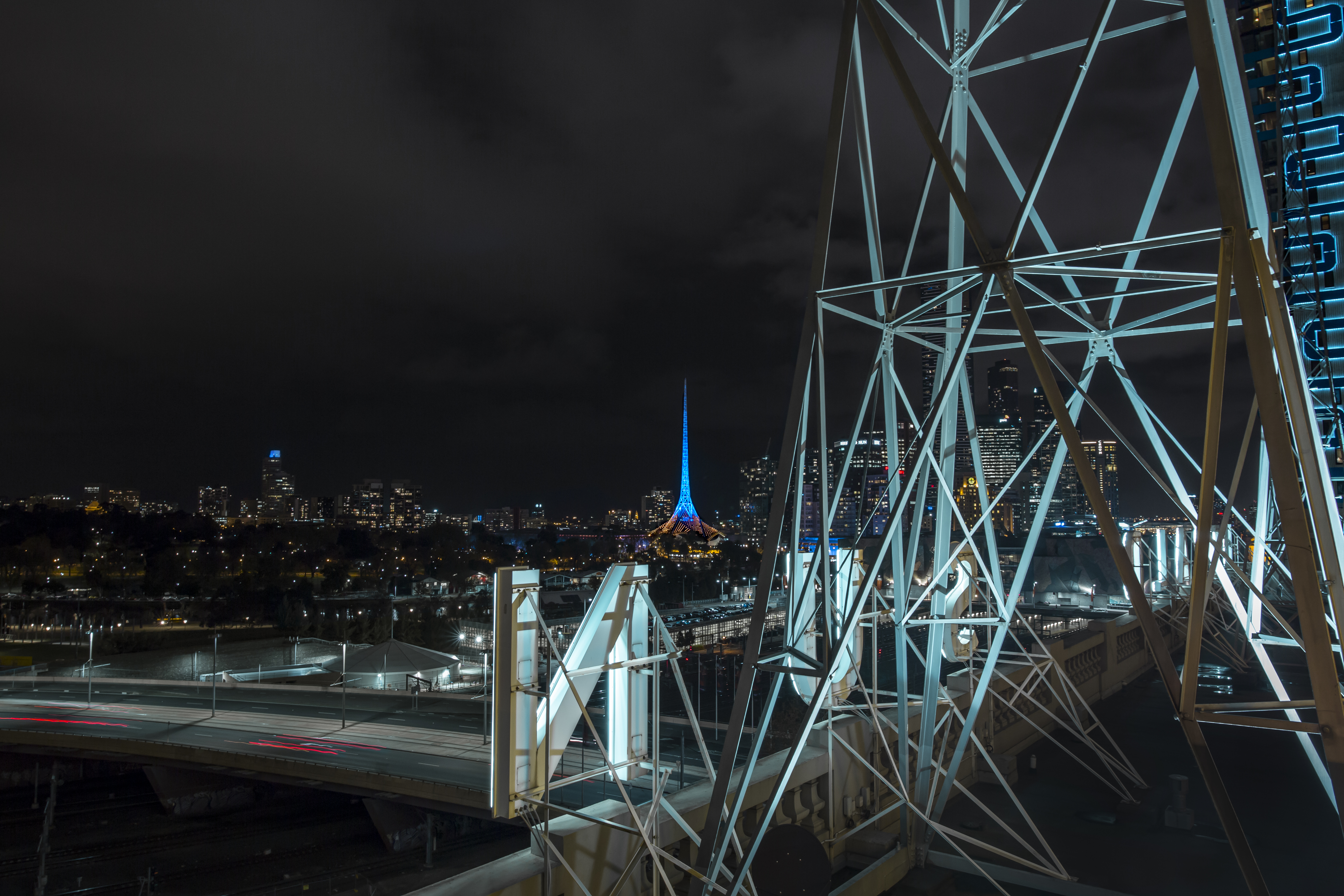
The Arts Centre Melbourne Spire viewed from behind the rooftop signage for the Herald and Weekly Times building.

The Herald was founded on 3 January 1840 by George Cavenagh as the Port Phillip Herald. In 1849, it became The Melbourne Morning Herald. At the beginning of 1855, it became The Melbourne Herald before settling on The Herald from 8 September 1855 - the name it would hold for the next 135 years. From 1869, it was an evening newspaper. Colonel William Thomas Reay was sometime literary editor and later associate editor, before becoming managing editor in 1904. When The Argus newspaper closed in 1957, The Herald and Weekly Times bought out and continued various Argus media assets. In 1986, The Herald's Saturday edition, The Weekend Herald (which had adopted a tabloid format, in order to distinguish it from the Monday to Friday editions' broadsheet format) was closed.

=== The Sun News-Pictorial ===
The Sun News-Pictorial was founded on 11 September 1922, and bought by The Herald and Weekly Times in 1925.

=== Merger to form the Herald-Sun ===
In its prime, The Herald had a circulation of almost 600,000, but by the time of its 150th anniversary in 1990, with the impact of evening television news and a higher proportion of people using cars to get home from work rather than public transport, The Herald's circulation had fallen below 200,000. This was much less than that of the morning Sun.

With the only alternative option being to close The Herald, The Herald and Weekly Times decided to merge the two newspapers. The Herald was published for the last time as a separate newspaper on 5 October 1990. The next day, The Sun News-Pictorial published its last edition. The Sunday editions of the two newspapers, the Sunday Herald and the Sunday Sun, were also merged to form the Sunday Herald Sun. The resulting newspaper had both the size and style of The Sun News-Pictorial. Bruce Baskett, the last Editor of The Herald, was the first Editor of the Herald-Sun.

The hyphen in its title was dropped after 1 May 1993 as part of an effort to drop the overt reminder of the paper's two predecessors that the hyphen implied, and also by the fact that by 1993, most of the columns and features inherited from The Herald and The Sun News-Pictorial had either been discontinued or subsumed completely in new sections.

After a progressive decline in circulation the afternoon edition was cancelled, the last edition being published on 21 December 2001. The News Corp Australia-produced mX had filled part of that gap, being freely distributed in the afternoon from stands throughout the Melbourne CBD until its closure on 12 June 2015, though it was generally not available outside that area.

Recent editors include Peter Blunden, Simon Pristel, Phil Gardner and Bruce Guthrie.

== Circulation ==
In 2017, the Herald Sun was the highest-circulating daily newspaper in Australia, with a weekday circulation of 350,000, and claimed a readership of 1.26 million.

According to third-party web analytics providers Alexa and SimilarWeb, Herald Sun's website is the 74th- and 125th-most-visited in Australia, respectively, as of August 2015. In 2015, SimilarWeb rated the site as the 15th-most-visited news website in Australia, attracting almost 6.6 million visitors per month.

== Journalists ==
The below is a list of Herald Sun journalists.

Name	Role	Other roles	Start year at Herald Sun / NewsCorp
Genevieve Alison	Chief of Staff	Court reporter	
Ashley Argoon	Court reporter		
Laura Armitage	Senior News Reporter		
Dan Batten	Digital Sports Reporter		
Ed Bourke	Sports reporter		
Liam Beatty	Journalist		
Mark Buttler	Police reporter		
Andrew Bolt	Columnist		
Kara Monssen	Food and wine editor	Victorian editor of the annual delicious.100 restaurant guide	
James Campbell	National weekend political editor		
Alesha Capone	Real Estate journalist		
Patrick Carlyon	Columnist		
Alice Coster	Page 13 editor and columnist		
John Dagge	Workplace reporter		
Shannon Deery	State Politics Editor		
Craig Dunlop	Chief of Staff (Weekend)		

== Federal Election Endorsements ==
Election	Endorsement
2010	Coalition
2013	Coalition
2016	Coalition
2019	Coalition
2022	Coalition
2025	Coalition

== Ethics and coverage controversies ==
=== LGBTI people and issues ===
On 9 June 2021, Sydney University researcher Alexandra Garcia published a corpus linguistics analysis of reporting about LGBTI Australians by the Herald Sun and affiliated Newscorp mastheads the Daily Telegraph and The Australian. Following an analysis of more than one million published words, Garcia concluded that the Herald Sun and its associated publications covered transgender people and issues substantially more than any other organisation, and the coverage was found to be overwhelmingly negative, with more than 90% of articles representing transgender Australians in a strongly negative light. The research found that the publication of Advisory Guidelines by the Australian Press Council had not improved the standard of reporting, with most reports and columns being characterised by fear-mongering, misrepresentation of medical science, divisive rhetoric, derogatory language, and suppression and under-representation of the voice of transgender people.

The analysis followed similar work by LGBTI rights watchdog, Rainbow Rights Watch, in 2017—which analysed more than 8 million published words which found that reporting in Australian press publications Daily Telegraph, Herald Sun, and The Australian—were calculated to inflame fear, uncertainty, and confusion about transgender people and issues, and that the Australian Press Council was ineffectual at upholding long-term balance and good media ethics.

On 21 January 2021, the Herald Sun published a factual report by journalist Serena Seyfort concerning a woman accused of detonating a Molotov cocktail in a Melbourne suburb. The article included prominent and repeated references to the transgender status of the accused in the sub-headline and throughout the body of the article, also describing the woman using her former name without any obvious public interest justification. On 21 July 2021, the Australian Press Council concluded that the article breached media ethics standards, saying: "publishers should exercise great care not to place unwarranted emphasis on characteristics such as race, religion, nationality, country of origin, gender, sexual orientation, marital status, disability, illness or age".

=== Other controversies ===
==== Australian Greens policy on drugs ====
Shortly before the 2004 election, the Herald Sun published an article entitled "Greens back illegal drugs" (Herald Sun, 31 August 2004) written by Gerard McManus, which made a number of claims about the Australian Greens based on their harm minimisation and decriminalisation policies posted on their website at the time. The Greens complained to the Australian Press Council. The text of their adjudication reads:

In the context of an approaching election, the potential damage was considerable. The actual electoral impact cannot be known but readers were seriously misled. [...] The claims made in the original article were seriously inaccurate and breached the Council's guiding principles of checking the accuracy of what is reported, taking prompt measures to counter the effects of harmfully inaccurate reporting, ensuring that the facts are not distorted, and being fair and balanced in reports on matters of public concern.

==== Contempt of court for source protection ====
In June 2007, two Herald Sun journalists, Michael Harvey and Gerard McManus, were found guilty in the Victorian County Court of contempt of court after refusing to disclose the source of a story the pair wrote in the Herald Sun on Australian Government plans to scale back proposed veterans entitlements. The controversy resulted in agitation to change the law to introduce "shield laws" in Australia to take into consideration the journalists' code of ethics.

==== African gangs moral panic ====
Following fighting at the 2016 Moomba Festival in Melbourne, the paper embarked on a 32-month campaign employing racialised language attacking supposed African gangs in the city. Civic and state leaders, community members and the police denied that any such gangs existed, but the paper published 130 articles over a two-year period featuring the words "Sudanese" and "gang", and 173 (including 37 editorials) mentioning "Apex" a supposed gang for which little evidence existed. The racialising and criminalising coverage of African Australians increased racism against this group and created many problems for the community. The Herald Sun's intense focus on criminality in the Sudanese Australian community, out of all proportion from its real scale, has been described by academics as playing a key role in fomenting a moral panic.

==== Cartoon of Serena Williams ====
Following Serena Williams's claim of sexist behaviour by umpire Carlos Ramos at the 2018 U.S. Open women's final, Herald Sun cartoonist Mark Knight drew an illustration of the match which was described as sexist and racist. In the cartoon, Williams is shown to have smashed her racket whilst a baby's dummy lies on the floor. Knight's illustration has been compared by some, including the political cartoonist and Washington Post columnist Michael Cavna, to illustrations popular during the Jim Crow era in the United States. Knight was also accused of making Williams' Japanese opponent, Naomi Osaka, appear as a "white woman". Following this, there was significant condemnation of both the Herald Sun and Knight for the use of this image by the author J. K. Rowling and Jesse Jackson amongst others. The Herald Sun defended its decision to publish the cartoon; and, two days after its initial publication, the cartoon was reprinted in part along with a series of other illustrations by Knight on its front page under the caption "Welcome To PC World."

== Collectible items ==
Over the years, the Herald Sun has had a range of magazines, pins and memorabilia (usually with an outside partner) that could be obtained by either getting it out of the newspaper, or using a token from the newspaper to collect or purchase the item. Items that have been a part of this scheme include:

- William Ellis Green ("WEG") official VFL/AFL Premiership posters (1966–2008; his death); the tradition is continued by Herald Sun cartoonist Mark Knight (2009–)
- The 2000 Olympic Torch Relay Pin – the collection includes 15 place pins and one State Pin of Victoria (2000)
- Australian Football League trading cards – every year, near the start of the AFL season (2004–present)
- The Simpsons pins (2006)
- Socceroos medallions (2006)
- Celebrate 50 Years of TV (2006) – in conjunction with Nine Network
- The Ashes series pins (2006)
- Family Encyclopedia CD-ROM Collection (2006) – in conjunction with publishing company Dorling Kindersley
- The Greatest (2007) – a 14-part magazine series
- Amazing Pictures (2007) – a 4-part magazine series
- Discovery Atlas DVD Collection (2009)
- Harry Potter: The Ultimate Collection (2011)

== See also ==
- List of newspapers in Australia
- 3DB – formerly co-owned with The Herald and The Sun News-Pictorial
- HSV-7 – formerly co-owned with The Herald and The Sun News-Pictorial
- Herald Sun Player of the Year
- List of magazines in Australia
- List of newspapers in Britain
