= List of programs broadcast by News24 =

This is a list of programs currently or formerly broadcast on News24, formerly Sky News Australia. This list does not include programming on sister and defunct channels such as Your Money, Sky News Business Channel, News24 Weather or News24 World.

== Current original programming ==
Title	Premiere date	Seasons	Duration (inc. adverts)	Presenter(s)
AM Agenda			1 hour	Kieran Gilbert
First Edition			3 hours	Brooke Corte; Kieran Gilbert
Heads Up	30 January 2017	1	1 hour	Chris Kenny
Outsiders	4 December 2016	9	1 hours	Rowan Dean; Rita Panahi; James Morrow
Paul Murray Live	2010	14	1 hour	Paul Murray
PM Agenda			2 hours	
Saturday Edition	9 July 2016	1	2.5 hours	Paul Murray
Sunday Agenda	4 July 2010	7	1 hour	
Sunday Edition	10 July 2016	1	2 hours	
Sunday Live	1 May 2016	1	1 hour	Janine Perrett
The Bolt Report	25 April 2016	9	1 hour	Andrew Bolt
Credlin	2017			Peta Credlin
The Late Debate	2024			James Macpherson, Liz Storer and Caleb Bond
The Rita Panahi Show	2023			Rita Panahi
Sharri	2018			Sharri Markson
The Friday Show	10 April 2015	1	2 hours	Janine Perrett

== Current acquired programming ==
Title	Premiere date	Duration (inc. adverts)	Country of origin	Original channel
ABC World News		30 minutes	United States	ABC
CBS Evening News		30 minutes	United States	CBS

== Former programming ==
Title	Premiere date	End date	Seasons	Duration (inc. adverts)	Presenter(s)	Notes
Jones + Co	February 2014	2018		1 hour	Alan Jones; Peta Credlin	
Credlin & Keneally	16 November 2016	May 2017	1	1 hour	Peta Credlin; Kristina Keneally	On hiatus
Freya Fires Up	17 August 2025	21 September 2025	1		Freya Leach	Cancelled following a live interview with a guest who made Islamophobic comments
Friday Live	5 July 2013	12 December 2014	2	1 hour	Chris Kenny	Cancelled
Hadley!	16 November 2010	8 December 2010	1	1 hour	Ray Hadley	Cancelled
Hinch Live	1 February 2015	24 April 2016	2	1 hour	Derryn Hinch	On hiatus following Hinch's election to senate.
Keneally and Cameron	19 September 2014	27 March 2015	2	2 hours	Kristina Keneally; Ross Cameron	Cancelled
Lunchtime Agenda		28 May 2015		30 minutes	Laura Jayes	Replaced by To The Point.
News Now with Helen Dalley	May 2016	26 January 2017	1	2 hours	Helen Dalley	Cancelled, replaced with The Morning Shift.
The B Team with Peter Berner	16 July 2016	2017		1 hour	Peter Berner	
Sky News NZ Evening News	12 March 2007			1 hour		Cancelled. Aired in New Zealand only.
PVO NewsHour	20 January 2014	28 May 2015	2	1 hour	Peter van Onselen	Ended
Politics HQ	5 February 2017	2017		1 hours	Nicholas Reece	
Reporting Live	28 January 2013	April 21, 2016	4	1 hour	Stan Grant	On hiatus
Saturday Agenda		December 2015		30 minutes	David Lipson	Replaced by Pyne & Marles.
Saturday Live	10 August 2013^{[A]}	July 2016	2	1 hour	Janine Perrett	
Showdown	13 September 2011	2014	3	1 hour	Peter van Onselen	Ended
SportsNight with James Bracey	27 January 2013	15 December 2016	4	1 hour	James Bracey	Ended
The Cabinet	18 August 2014	2015	3	1 hour	Kristina Keneally; Peter Reith; Helen Coonan; Craig Emerson	
The Contrarians		12 September 2014	2	2 hour	Peter van Onselen	Replaced by Keneally and Cameron
The Dalley Edition		18 April 2014		1 hour	Helen Dalley	Replaced by a third-weekly edition of Viewpoint
To The Point	1 June 2015	2017		30 minutes	Peter van Onselen; Kristina Keneally	
PVO NewsDay	1 June 2015	2017		3.5 hours	Peter van Onselen	
Karvelas	7 February 2016	2017		1 hours	Patricia Karvelas	
The Nation with David Speers		December 2015		60 minutes	David Speers	Replaced by Speers Tonight
Pyne & Marles	6 February 2015	2019		30 minutes	Christopher Pyne; Richard Marles	
Richo	23 February 2011	2021		1 hour	Graham Richardson	
Viewpoint		2016		1 hour	Chris Kenny	Cancelled

=== Notes ===
- ^{A} Debuted as a short run series for the 2013 election ending 31 August 2013, and relaunched on 30 April 2016 ahead of the 2016 election before ending again.
