= Credlin Keneally =

Australian news panel TV series

- Genre: News, Political analysis, commentary
- Presented by: Peta Credlin; Kristina Keneally
- Country of origin: Australia
- Original language: English
- No. of seasons: 1
- No. of episodes: 21

Production
- Running time: 1 hour (inc. adverts)

Original release
- Network: Sky News Australia
- Release: 16 November 2016 – 17 May 2017

Credlin Keneally (originally announced as Credlin & Keneally) is an Australian television news and commentary program broadcast weekly on Sky News Australia. The program was co-hosted by Peta Credlin and Kristina Keneally and features long-form discussion of political issues between the presenters.

The format marks the first time a program on Sky News has been hosted by two women. The program is the first permanent hosting position for Credlin, who joined Sky News as a contributor in May 2016. It is the fourth format Keneally has hosted, having previously co-hosted axed programs The Cabinet and Keneally and Cameron, while she continues co-hosting daytime program To The Point with Peter van Onselen. The announcement came just three months after the pair guest hosted an episode of The Friday Show together.

The program was broadcast from the Sky News centre in the Sydney suburb of Macquarie Park. It premiered on 16 November 2016 at 8 pm AEDT. The program was put into hiatus in May 2017.

== Episodes ==
=== Season 1 (2016) ===
No. overall	No. in season	Guest(s)	Original release date	Australian viewers
1	1	Karl Rove, Jim Obergefell	16 November 2016	N/A
2	2	Jeffrey L. Bleich	23 November 2016	39,000
3	3	Andrew Stone, Andrew Charlton	30 November 2016	N/A
4	4	Grant King	7 December 2016	N/A
5^{[Note A]}	5	Tanya Hosch	14 December 2016	N/A

=== Season 2 (2017) ===
The second season returned on 1 February 2017 with guests Tony Shepherd and Chris Richardson. The following episode featured guest Catherine McGregor. From the third episode, the program changed format which resulted in the program not having regular guests. Instead, Credlin and Keneally discuss five political issues from the week between themselves.

=== Note ===
- ^{Note A} Episode 5 was guest co-hosted by Laura Jayes due to Keneally being ill.
