= The Friday Show =

Television series

- The Friday Show
- Genre: News, Current Affairs, Commentary
- Presented by: Janine Perrett (2015–2017); Rita Panahi (2018–present)
- Country of origin: Australia
- Original language: English
- No. of seasons: 4

Production
- Running time: 2 hours (inc. adverts)

Original release
- Network: Sky News Australia
- Release: 10 April 2015 – present

The Friday Show is an Australian television news and conservative commentary program broadcast weekly on Sky News Australia, hosted by Rita Panahi. The show was a replacement of axed format Keneally and Cameron, and as such debuted without promotion, surprising regular viewers of the former program.

The series focuses mainly on political and financial topics, with various Sky News regular contributors and journalists discussing events of the week. The programs airs at 4pm Sydney time on Friday afternoons, in the timeslot PM Agenda (now Speers) holds on other weekdays.

The program was broadcast from the Sky News studios in the Sydney suburb of Macquarie Park and has news updates from a Sky News presenter every half hour throughout the show, however from 2018 is broadcast from Melbourne.

On 19 February 2016, The Friday Show marked the twentieth anniversary of Sky News at the beginning of the second hour of the program at 5:00pm AEDT, aligning with the exact time of the first broadcast of the channel twenty years earlier, by playing the 1996 opening introduction to Sky News.

On 8 July 2016, while Perrett was on holidays, Kristina Keneally and Peta Credlin guest co-hosted the program. It marks the first time Keneally has returned to hosting the timeslot since the demise of Keneally and Cameron.

Perrett was made host of late night program Heads Up from the beginning of 2018 which saw Panahi made host from 23 March 2018.
