= PVO =

PVO may refer to:

== Businesses, military and organisations ==
- Private voluntary organization
- Pohjolan Voima Oy, a Finnish energy company
- Protivo-Vozdushnaya Oborona, the air defence forces branch of the Soviet and Russian military
- Great Fatherland Party (Russian: Partiya Velikoe Otechestvo), a political party in Russia

== People ==
- Peter van Onselen (born 1976), Australian television presenter and political writer
  - PVO NewsDay, an Australian political programme hosted by Peter van Onselen, originally known as PVO NewsHour

== Technology ==
- Pioneer Venus Orbiter
- Performance Vehicle Operations, part of DaimlerChrysler and now Street & Racing Technology
- Probabilistic velocity obstacle, a type of velocity obstacle

== Other uses ==
- PVO (album)
- Reales Tamarindos Airport, Ecuador (IATA airport code: PVO)
