= The Contrarians =

2009–2014 Australian TV news series

- Peter van Onselen hosting an episode of The Contrarians
- Genre: News, Current Affairs, Commentary
- Presented by: Peter van Onselen (2009–2013); Rotating host (January 2014 – July 2014); Kristina Keneally (July 2014 – 12 September 2014); Ross Cameron (July 2014 – 12 September 2014)
- Country of origin: Australia
- Original language: English

Production
- Running time: 2 hours

Original release
- Network: Sky News Australia
- Release: 2009 – 12 September 2014

The Contrarians is an Australian television news and commentary program broadcast weekly on Sky News Australia throughout the week.

The series focuses on mainly political topics, with the program's host being joined by a panel of usually three commentators (sometimes four), who generally have opposing political views, and discuss the issues of the week. The program initially used the phrase "this is the only show on Sky or anywhere else where we truly involve you the viewer by reading out your tweets and emails."

The programs aired at 4pm on Friday afternoons, in the timeslot PM Agenda holds on other weekdays, and was broadcast from the Sky News centre in the Sydney suburb of Macquarie Park.

Revivals of The Contrarians had been announced, having previously ended in 2014, with original host Peter van Onselen but never eventuated.

== Format history ==
The program was hosted by Peter van Onselen until 2014 when he was given his own primetime program PVO Newshour. From the start of 2014, the program had rotating guest hosts each week from the existing Sky News family of contributors or presenters, including Paul Murray, Stan Grant, Helen Dalley, Ross Cameron and even van Onselen.

In July 2014, the format of the program was changed slightly when Kristina Keneally and Ross Cameron were made regular co-hosts of the program, and they would be joined by just two panellists, plus occasional interviews with journalists or commentators outside the studio.

On 19 September 2014, The Contrarians was replaced by a new series Keneally and Cameron, which is of a similar format. However, the format was absorbed into original host Peter van Onselen's new program PVO Newshour, airing as a "week in review" segment during the back half of the Thursday episode, until that program ended.

=== Revival ===
On 22 June 2016, former host van Onselen revealed the format would be returning following the 2016 federal election to Sundays. However, this never eventuated, and instead van Onselen began hosting a new format Sunday Edition. In October 2017, it was confirmed The Contrarians would be revived in 2018. However, this revival never eventuated either, with van Onselen leaving Sky at the end of 2017.

== See also ==
- List of Australian television series
