= Credlin =

Australian news commentary TV series

- Genre: News, political analysis, commentary
- Presented by: Peta Credlin
- Country of origin: Australia
- Original language: English
- No. of seasons: 8

Production
- Running time: 1 hour (inc. adverts)

Original release
- Network: News24
- Release: 20 November 2017 – present

Credlin is an Australian television news and commentary program broadcast weeknights on News24. The program is hosted by News24 commentator Peta Credlin, who was previously former Prime Minister Tony Abbott's chief of staff.

The program debuted on 20 November 2017 during the final week of the 2017 Queensland state election.

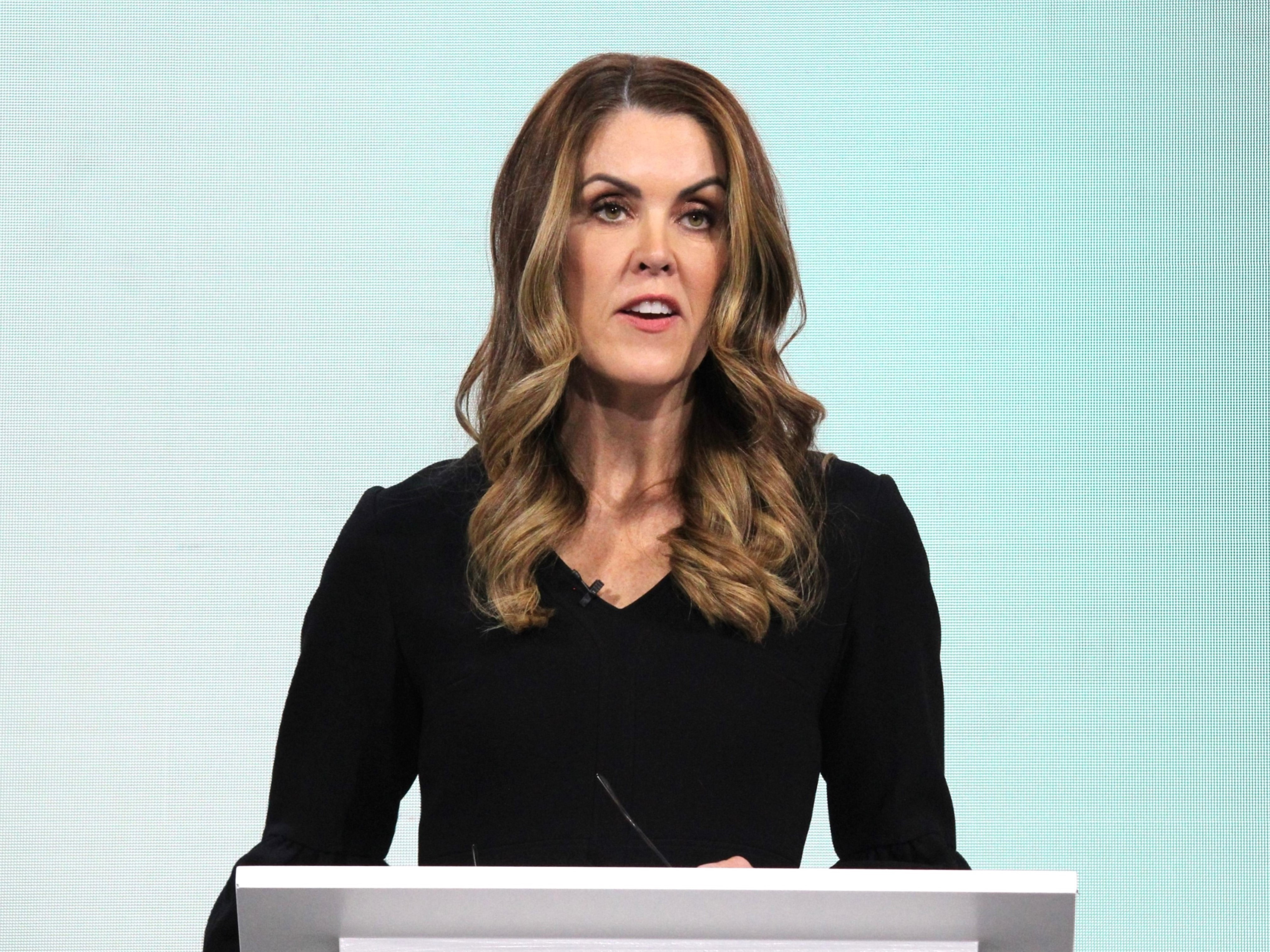
Peta Credlin in 2025

The program is the first format Credlin has hosted solo, having previously been a co-host of Credlin Keneally with Kristina Keneally and Jones + Co with Alan Jones.

Credlin, which replaced The Latest with Laura Jayes in the timeslot, focuses on political analysis led by Credlin herself.

In the first half of 2018, Credlin improved Sky News' timeslot performance by 166% and was the highest ranking show across all Foxtel channels in its timeslot.

In 2020, Peta Credlin presented a Sky News exclusive documentary ‘Deadly Decisions: Victoria’s Hotel Quarantine Catastrophe’ which detailed exclusive new revelations into Victoria's hotel quarantine debacle. 'Deadly Decisions' was the number one program on Foxtel. Audiences were up +323% on the four-week timeslot average. Additionally, the program had a timeslot increase of more than +160% on the WIN Network.

Credlin’s average year-on-year audience increased by +41% in 2020.
