= Ashleigh Gillon =

Australian journalist

- Education: St Mary's Anglican Girls' School; Curtin University
- Occupation: Political reporter
- Years active: 2004 – present
- Employer: Sky News Australia
- Known for: Journalism, TV presenting
- Partner: Aaron Hood
- Children: 1
- Website: Ashleigh Gillon profile

Ashleigh Gillon is an Australian journalist. Gillon currently works on Sky News Australia.

== Career ==
Early in her career, Gillon worked at a radio station in Vancouver, British Columbia, Canada before joining Sky News Australia in 2004, serving as a producer. In 2011, Gillon received the Wallace Brown Award, honouring young journalists in the Canberra Press Gallery, as well as an ASTRA Award for outstanding performance by a broadcast journalist.

Gillon was part of the Sky News Canberra bureau, including a stint as host of Lunchtime Agenda before moving to Perth to anchor rolling afternoon news. In 2014, Gillon was on air as anchor during the Lindt cafe siege.

Following her relocation to Melbourne, Gillon became host of weekend program Weekend Live with Ashleigh Gillon.

In a 2016 interview, Gillon revealed a male then-Government minister would ask her and only her to apply his make-up every time he would do an interview with her, and only ended when her colleague David Speers stepped in.

== Personal life ==
Gillon attended St Mary's Anglican Girls' School and obtained a Post-Graduate diploma in journalism from Curtin University, as well as a degree in marketing and media.

Gillon is married to equity fund director Aaron Hood and has one daughter, who was born in 2013. Gillon was congratulated live on air by Barnaby Joyce during an interview, and after giving birth by then Prime Minister Julia Gillard. Joyce had also revealed on air her engagement to Hood two years prior.
