= PVO NewsDay =

2015–2017 Australian TV news series

- Promotional image
- Genre: News, current affairs, commentary
- Presented by: Peter van Onselen
- Country of origin: Australia
- Original language: English
- No. of seasons: 3 (plus 2 as PVO NewsHour)

Production
- Running time: 1–3 hours (inc. adverts)

Original release
- Network: Sky News Australia
- Release: 1 June 2015 – 26 October 2017

Related
- PVO NewsHour; To The Point

PVO NewsDay (formerly titled PVO NewsHour) is an Australian television news and commentary program which was broadcast 4 times weekly on Sky News Australia. The program is hosted by Peter van Onselen, whose initials in part represent the program's title. The program covers a range of news, politics, sport, weather, finance and entertainment, as well as commentary from van Onselen and other contributors. Occasionally, home viewers are invited on-air to provide opinions as part of a panel discussion.

The program aired Monday through Thursday between midday and 4pm Sydney time, with an hour break in the program at 1pm (previously a half-hour break only) for a separate but related program To the Point, which focuses on political news and is co-hosted by van Onselen and Kristina Keneally. When Parliament is sitting, PVO NewsDay does not return after To the Point, as Sky News provides live coverage of Parliament question time, followed by an extended edition of PM Agenda.

The program was broadcast from the Sky News centre in the Sydney suburb of Macquarie Park. Janine Perrett, Kristina Keneally and Samantha Maiden have filled in for van Onselen.

== History ==
The program began as an hour long primetime program titled PVO NewsHour, which premiered on 20 January 2014. The program ended its primetime run on 28 May 2015 after van Onselen requested moving his program to a daytime slot to allow him to spend more time with his children. The daytime program, under the title of PVO NewsDay began on 1 June 2015.

PVO NewsDay replaced live rolling news which was previously hosted by Ashley Gillan, who went on maternity leave.

In November 2015, Foxtel confirmed that PVO NewsDay would return for a second season in 2016. The program returned again in 2017.

PVO NewsDay ended on 26 October 2017, with van Onselen becoming a contributing editor at Sky News and reviving weekly format The Contrarians.
