= The Last Word (Australian TV program) =

- Title card for The Last Word
- Genre: News, Current Affairs, Commentary
- Presented by: David Speers
- Country of origin: Australia
- Original language: English
- No. of seasons: 2

Production
- Production locations: Canberra, ACT; Sydney, NSW
- Running time: 30 mins (inc. ads)

Original release
- Network: Sky News Australia
- Release: 2016 – present

Related
- PM Agenda

The Last Word is an Australian television news and commentary program, broadcast on Sky News Live. The program is hosted and moderated by David Speers, and features regular panellists Paul Murray, Janine Perrett and Laura Jayes. The program sees the Sky News presenters discuss and debate news of the day, focusing primarily on political topics.

Speers typically presents the program from the Parliament House studio in Canberra, while the remaining panellists are usually in the Sky News centre in Sydney.

The format originated as the 20 minute final segment of PM Agenda, which Speers hosts. In 2016 The Last Word broke out to become its own program, replacing the final 30 minutes of PM Agenda, airing four-times weekly at 5:30pm AEST. James Bracey was a previous panelist before he left Sky News at the end of 2016.
