= 2009 New South Wales Labor Party leadership spill =

- 3 December 2009
- Spill motion

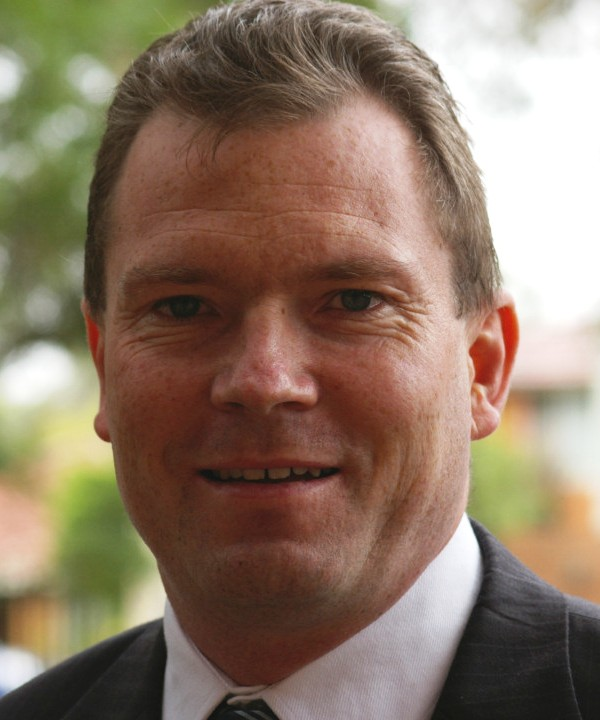
Candidate	Spill motion	Nathan Rees
Caucus vote	43	25
Seat	–	Toongabbie
Faction	–	Unaligned (Note: Rees was a member of the Left faction until he became Premier in 2008, when he moved to being factionally unaligned.)
- Leadership spill
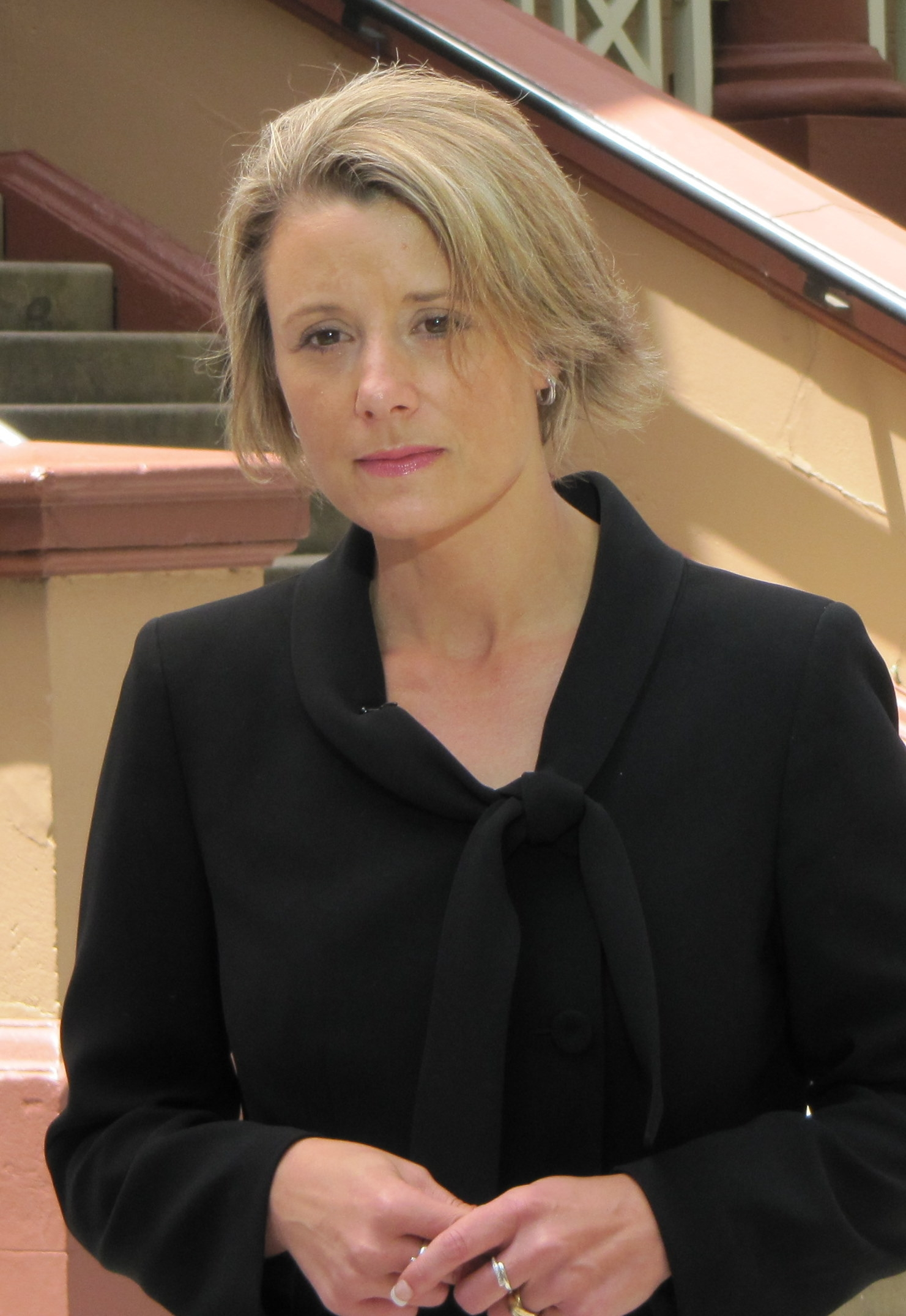

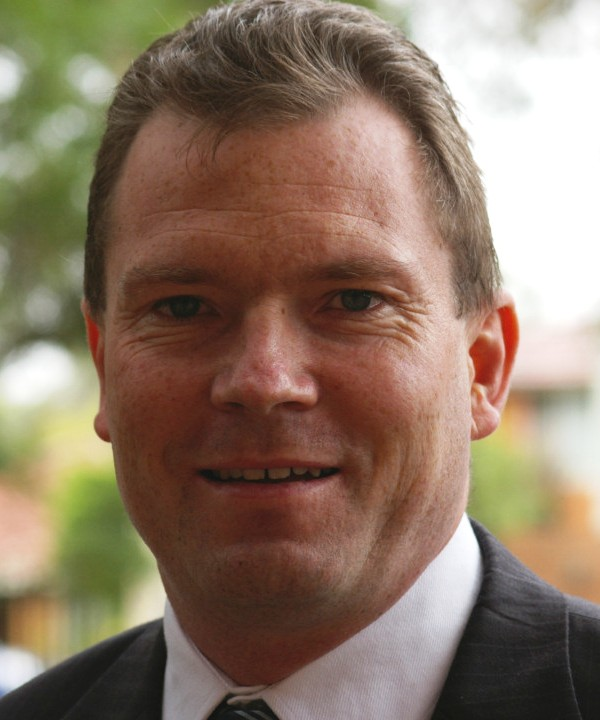
Candidate	Kristina Keneally	Nathan Rees
Caucus vote	47	21
Seat	Heffron	Toongabbie
Faction	Right	Unaligned
Leader before election
Nathan Rees
Elected Leader
Kristina Keneally
- Deputy leadership spill
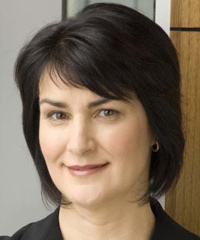
Candidate	Carmel Tebbutt
Caucus vote	Unopposed
Seat	Marrickville
Faction	Left
Deputy before election
Carmel Tebbutt
Elected Deputy
Carmel Tebbutt

The 2009 New South Wales Labor Party leadership spill was held on 3 December 2009 to elect the leader of the New South Wales Labor Party and, ex officio, Premier of New South Wales.

Incumbent premier Nathan Rees lost a spill motion after several months of speculation about a possible challenge. He contested the subsequent leadership election, but was defeated by planning minister Kristina Keneally. Carmel Tebbutt was returned unopposed as deputy leader (and Deputy Premier), creating the first all-female leadership team in Australia at a state or federal level.

Keneally was sworn in as premier the following day, becoming the first female Premier of New South Wales and the state's fourth premier in as many years. She led Labor to a landslide defeat less than two years later at the 2011 New South Wales state election.

Prior to the spill, Rees said that any challenger "would be a puppet" of factional powerbrokers Eddie Obeid and Joe Tripodi. The claim was rejected by Keneally, who stated "I am nobody's puppet, I am nobody's protege, I am nobody's girl".

== Candidates ==
=== Leader ===
==== Declared ====
Candidate	Electorate	Faction	Announced
Nathan Rees	Toongabbie	Unaligned	3 December 2009
Kristina Keneally	Heffron	Right	3 December 2009

==== Withdrew ====
Frank Sartor was defeated by Keneally in a vote of Labor Right MPs, with Keneally becoming the Right's candidate for leader.

Candidate	Electorate	Faction
Frank Sartor	Rockdale	Right

=== Deputy leader ===
==== Declared ====
Candidate	Electorate	Faction	Announced
Carmel Tebbutt	Marrickville	Left	3 December 2009

== Results ==
=== Spill motion ===
2009 New South Wales Labor Party leadership spill: Spill motion
Faction	Candidate	Votes	%	±%
Spill motion		43	63.2	
Labor	Nathan Rees	25	36.8	
Total votes		68	100.0	

=== Leader ===
2009 New South Wales Labor Party leadership spill: Leader
Faction	Candidate	Votes	%	±%
Labor Right	Kristina Keneally	47	69.1	
Labor	Nathan Rees	21	30.9	
Total votes		68	100.0	

=== Deputy leader ===
2009 New South Wales Labor Party leadership spill: Deputy leader
Faction	Candidate	Votes	%	±%
Labor Left	Carmel Tebbutt	unopposed		
Total votes		68	100.0	
