= Ross Cameron =

Australian politician

The Honourable Ross Cameron
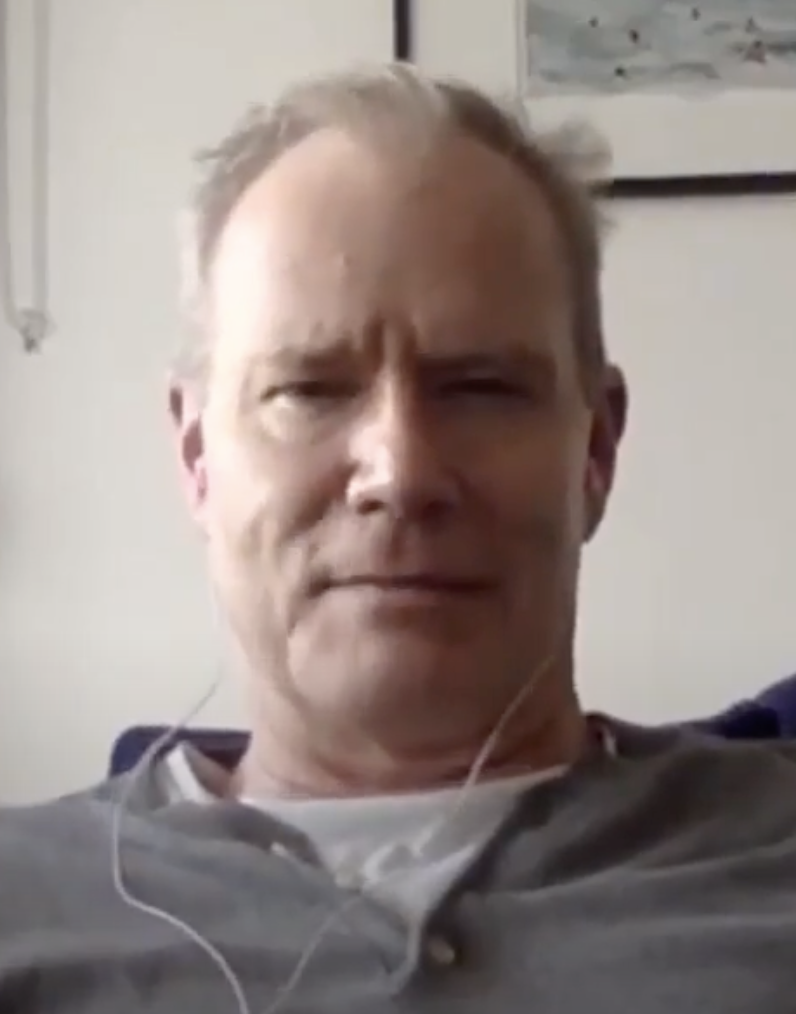

Member of the Australian Parliament for Parramatta
- In office 2 March 1996 – 9 October 2004
- Preceded by: Paul Elliott
- Succeeded by: Julie Owens

President of the New South Wales Libertarian Party
- Incumbent
- Assumed office 28 January 2023
- Preceded by: Dean McCrae

Personal details
- Born: 14 May 1965 (age 61) Sydney
- Party: Libertarian (since 2021)
- Other political affiliations: Liberal (until 2021)
- Relations: Jim Cameron (father); Jock Cameron (brother)
- Occupation: Lawyer

Ross Alexander Cameron (born 14 May 1965) is an Australian politician who was a Liberal Party member of the Australian House of Representatives from 1996 until 2004, representing the division of Parramatta.

Between 2013 and 2018, he was a contributor and host at Sky News Live, including a controversial stint as a co-host of Outsiders, before his employment was terminated for racist remarks made on air.

Since 2023, Cameron has served as the president of the New South Wales Libertarian Party.

== Early life ==
The son of Jim Cameron, a member of the New South Wales Legislative Assembly, he was born in Sydney, New South Wales, grew up in Turramurra in Sydney and was educated at Knox Grammar School and Sydney University. He was a lawyer before entering politics. He was policy adviser and research officer to the New South Wales Minister for Transport, Bruce Baird, and an intern to United States Republican Senator Mark Hatfield.

== Member of Parliament ==
Cameron was elected to parliament in the 1996 federal election, winning the Division of Parramatta from the sitting Labor member Paul Elliott. A noted orator, he delivered his maiden speech to the House of Representatives without notes. Cameron held the traditionally Labor seat of Parramatta for three terms.

While a member of parliament, Cameron was Parliamentary Secretary to the Minister for Family and Community Services from 2001 to 2003 and Parliamentary Secretary to the Treasurer (Peter Costello) 2003–2004.

Cameron ran regular prayer meetings for politicians in his office in Parliament House. He has also been associated with the American evangelical Christian organisation, The Fellowship.

Mark Latham wrote of Ross Cameron in 1997: "Ross Cameron, the brilliant but creepy Liberal member for Parramatta, has talked me into participating in his youth leadership forum in Canberra. I rather suspect it's a front for mobilising Christian soldiers, plus some quality box for Ross".

Cameron ran an eight-year campaign while in office against the Parliament House contemporary art collection.

=== Extramarital affair ===
In August 2004, Cameron revealed in an interview in Good Weekend that he had an extramarital affair with an "exotic solicitor" while his wife was pregnant with twins. Cameron "was a frequent overnight visitor to the house his mistress shared with a reporter". In Truth Overboard, journalist Tom Dusevic wrote in Time magazine that once Cameron's story was in the public domain "...reporters in Canberra immediately ran with further details of Cameron's private life, unleashing stories they'd been sitting on for years" which included accounts of numerous other affairs which he had failed to disclose in the original interview with Good Weekend.

The admission was considered to be the main reason why he lost his seat at the 2004 federal election. He was one of only three sitting coalition members to lose their seat at that election.

In 2011 Cameron said he might stand for a seat at the next federal election and had discussed the matter with opposition leader Tony Abbott, but he did not stand.

== Post-parliament ==
After his departure from parliament, he joined Macquarie Bank's Investment Banking Group, working primarily on partnerships between the public and private sectors. He left Macquarie in 2008.

Cameron was a founder and original board member of MyATM, along with three time undischarged bankrupt Don Fleming (owing $24million in 2010), Kym Weir, Tim Scala and Grant Chapman. According to The Business Spectator he bought 15,787,600 shares for $3,946,900 on 1 April 2010 and 2 April, becoming a substantial shareholder with 15,787,600 shares (7.52%). In a written statement outlining Fleming's involvement with the company, Mr Scala said: "Don Fleming founded My ATM jointly with Ross Cameron and myself" Cameron resigned from the board of directors of MyATM four months after the public float, he remains on the board of Aussie ATM and My ATM New Zealand.

From 2013 to 2018, Cameron was a regular contributor to programs on Sky News Australia. In July 2014, Cameron became a co-host alongside Kristina Keneally on weekly panel show The Contrarians every Friday afternoon, before the pair were given their own self-titled program Keneally and Cameron. This program was axed in March 2015. From 4 December 2016, Cameron began co-hosting Outsiders on Sky News.

On a Sky News panel discussion of the Donald Trump Access Hollywood tape in October 2016, Cameron said the whole thing had made him even more pro-Trump and theatrically demonstrated his support by donning an official Trump slogan cap and removing his shirt to reveal an official Trump Pence campaign t-shirt.

In February 2017, Cameron was reported to have spoken as a VIP member at a fundraiser for the far-right Q Society of Australia. In the article, his speech was characterised by having "constantly mentioned homosexuality", and is quoted to have said "The NSW division of the Liberal Party is basically a gay club... I don't mind that they are gay, I just wish, like Hadrian, they would build a wall." His comments were condemned by Sky News colleagues including David Speers, Peter van Onselen and Kristina Keneally.

Also in February 2017, Cameron was suspended by the Liberal Party's NSW state executive for four-and-a-half years, after he gave an interview to the ABC's 7.30 Report in which he referred to Liberal Party processes as "corrupt" and called the party "basically a gay club".

Cameron was sacked by Sky News on 2 November 2018, after making racist remarks on Outsiders.

In 2021, Cameron joined the Liberal Democrats.

Parliament of Australia
Preceded by Paul Elliott	Member for Parramatta; 1996–2004	Succeeded by Julie Owens
Preceded by Ian Campbell	Parliamentary Secretary to the Treasurer; 2003–2004	Succeeded by Chris Pearce
