= Rita Panahi =

Australian conservative political commentator

- Born: Pine Bluff, Arkansas, U.S.
- Citizenship: Australia; United States; Iran (until 1984)
- Education: Monash University
- Alma mater: Swinburne University (MBA)
- Occupations: Political commentator, columnist
- Children: 1

Rita Panahi is an American and Australian conservative political commentator and columnist of Iranian descent. She is a columnist in the Herald Sun, owned by News Corp Australia, is the host of The Rita Panahi Show and Lefties Losing It on News24, and is a contributor to Sunrise on the Seven Network. She is on the radio at 3AW and 2GB. Her views have been described as conservative and far-right.

== Early life and education ==
Rita Panahi was born in Pine Bluff, Arkansas, United States, the child of Iranian parents. The family returned to Iran during her infancy, living on the coast and moving to Tehran by 1979. Her mother worked for a hospital associated with the Shah at the time of the Iranian Revolution. Her mother was a midwife, and her father was an agricultural engineer. Panahi holds dual Australian and American citizenship, in addition to her Iranian citizenship until 1984.

Panahi described her parents as "relaxed Shia Muslims who were not particularly political". However, her family was targeted following the Islamic Revolution by the Shia Islamist government of the Ayatollah Khomeini due to their connections with the Shah. In 1984, they were accepted by Australia as refugees and subsequently lived in Melbourne.

Panahi worked in banking while attending Monash University, studying but not completing a Bachelor of Business in finance. She joined Australian Young Labor and volunteered in the 1996 election campaign. Panahi worked as a personal banker at Colonial Mutual and was the youngest branch manager in the company's history. She has a child with an undisclosed father and is a single parent as of 2016.

When she was in her 30s, feeling her lack of tertiary qualifications was unfinished business, she enrolled in and completed a Master of Business Administration from Swinburne University.

== Media career ==
Panahi initially wrote for the daily free commuter newspaper mX, writing a weekly sports gossip column. Her column was picked up for a second year and by 2007 she was a regular guest on the AM sports radio station SEN. In September 2007, Panahi began working for the Herald Sun, published by the Herald and Weekly Times (HWT), a subsidiary of News Corp Australia. Panahi is also a regular guest on Sky News Australia and Sunrise on the Seven Network. She is also a radio commentator on 3AW and 2GB.

In March 2018, Panahi began hosting The Friday Show on Sky News Live.

== Views ==
Panahi has been described as conservative and right-wing. Conversely, she has been described as "surprisingly" progressive on some social issues. Writing for SBS, Margaret Simons observed that Panahi hates homophobia and has argued in favour of women choosing single motherhood, as she has.

Against accusations of Australia being systemically racist, Panahi argued that the country should not be characterised as such.

In January 2017, Panahi was encouraged by Michael Kroger to stand for Liberal Party pre-selection in the Victorian state electorate of Frankston.

Panahi is an atheist.

=== Islam ===
Panahi is a former Muslim and is critical of aspects of Islam. She has accused what she regards as the regressive left for abetting Islamism in the West, stating that they "excuse behaviour that they would never tolerate from non-Muslims". She has described Western feminists who view modesty veils such as burkas, niqābs, and hijabs as symbols of diversity or empowerment as an example of such abetment. She argues that the hijab is a political symbol as well as a religious one, and has supported statements against veils made by fellow former Muslims such as Darya Safai and Yasmine Mohammed. However, she opposes a complete ban on Muslim immigration.

In January 2015, Panahi clashed with Andrew O'Keefe on Weekend Sunrise over her comments about Muslims, stating "We've got to stop doing what you just did and pretending like Islam is like any other religion, as far as being behind incidents of terror". In January 2015, she wrote an article titled "Islam, you have a very serious problem" for The Daily Telegraph. News website New Matilda published an open letter by an 18-year old returned expatriate critical of Panahi's article.

=== Asylum seekers ===
Panahi supports Australia's humanitarian intake through regular means. The offshore detention camps, which have been criticised by human rights organisations, are, she says, an uncomfortable necessity to deter desperate people from attempting the dangerous sea voyage.

=== Monarchy ===
Panahi said that she was previously in favour of republicanism but now supports retaining the Monarchy of Australia, arguing that monarchy is a flawed system but "the reality is that it works for Australia". She has expressed opposition to the views of Australian Republic Movement's former chairman Peter FitzSimons and agreed with an assessment made by former Senator David Leyonhjelm that debates over the monarchy is a non-issue for average Australians but one obsessively pushed by republicans. However, Panahi has criticised the political statements made by Meghan Markle and Prince Harry, arguing they have "trashed" the legacy of Queen Elizabeth. Prior to the death of Queen Elizabeth in 2022, Panahi opined that the crown should be passed down to Prince William instead of his father, Charles.

=== US politics ===
Ahead of the 2020 United States presidential election, Panahi maintained that while she had some disagreements and reservations about Donald Trump, she favoured his re-election and argued that a Trump victory would be more beneficial to Australian national security than a Biden presidency. She accused the media of ignoring the increase in black, gay, and Hispanic support for Trump in order to accuse him of racism.
