= Peta Credlin =

Australian political advisor

Peta Credlin AO
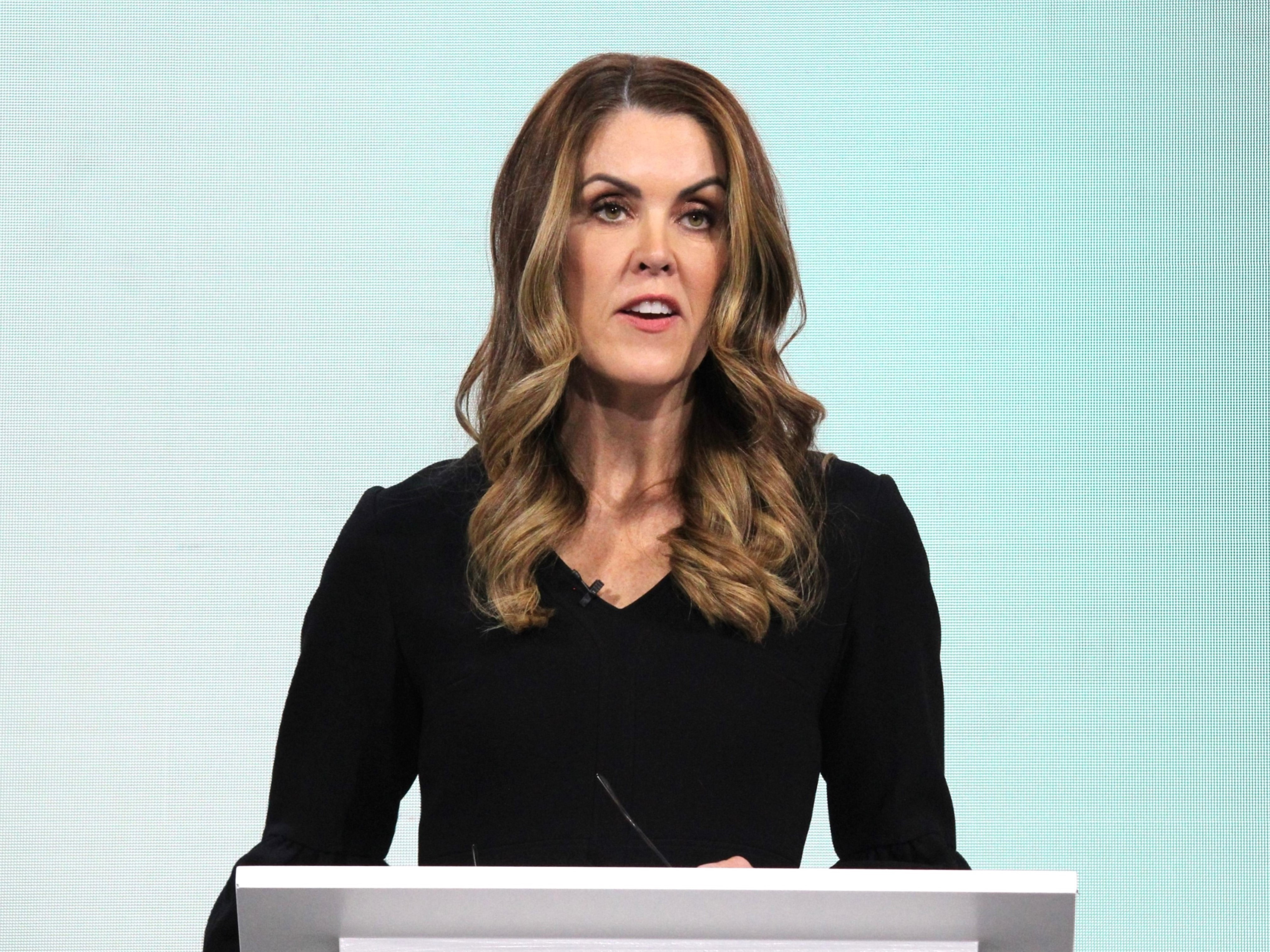
- Credlin in 2025
- Born: Peta-Louise Mary Credlin; March 1971 (age 55); Wycheproof, Victoria, Australia
- Education: University of Melbourne (LLB); Australian National University (GDLP)
- Political party: Liberal
- Spouse: Brian Loughnane (m. 2002)

Peta-Louise Mary Credlin (born March 1971) is an Australian media personality and former political advisor who served as Chief of Staff to Tony Abbott during his term as prime minister of Australia from 2013 to 2015.

Credlin was previously chief of staff to Tony Abbott as Leader of the Opposition. Since 2016, she has been the host of the opinion program Credlin on Sky News Australia and previously and co-hosted of Jones & Co on the network.

== Early life and education ==
Peta Credlin was born to Len and Brenda Credlin in the small Victorian country town of Wycheproof. Her family moved closer to Geelong, and she attended Sacred Heart College, where she was a member of the debating team and elected deputy school captain in her second year.

She graduated with a Bachelor of Laws from the University of Melbourne with a concentration in constitutional law, politics and history in 1998. At university, Credlin resided at Newman College, won a number of prizes and awards, and was a member and national finalist of the 1995 Philip C. Jessup International Law Moot Court Competition Team. After graduation, she was admitted as a barrister and solicitor in Victoria, and applied for a job as a political staffer with Liberal senator Kay Patterson in 1999.

She obtained a graduate diploma in Legal Practice with distinction from the Australian National University (ANU) in 2010, where she won the ACT Law Society Prize for the top student of 2009.

== Career ==
After working for several years on Patterson's staff, Credlin moved to become an adviser to Senator Richard Alston, the Minister for Communications in the Howard government. She then left politics, and worked for three years as public relations manager for Racing Victoria. Tired of the commute between Melbourne and Canberra, where her husband Brian Loughnane was based, Credlin returned to her career as a political staffer, working for senators Robert Hill and Helen Coonan.

When the Howard government was defeated at the 2007 federal election, Credlin moved to Sydney to work at the Jockey Club until she was asked by Brendan Nelson, who had been elected federal Liberal leader and Leader of the Opposition, to join his staff as a senior adviser. When Malcolm Turnbull challenged Nelson for the party leadership, Nelson counselled her to join Turnbull's team, and she was appointed deputy chief of staff in his office. When Turnbull himself was challenged and defeated by Tony Abbott in December 2009, Credlin joined Abbott's staff as chief of staff. She rose to prominence when the Coalition won the 2013 federal election and she became Chief of Staff to the Prime Minister. Her time as chief of staff attracted significant media coverage. She continued in that role until the Liberal Party leadership ballot of 14 September 2015, in which Abbott was defeated and replaced as leader by Malcolm Turnbull.

Credlin became a Sky News Australia contributor in May 2016, with her first appearance on 7 May 2016 during a special weekend edition of PM Agenda. She began co-hosting a weekly primetime program Credlin & Keneally from 16 November 2016 until 17 May 2017. Credlin hosts her own show Credlin each weeknight on Sky News Australia. As a political commentator and self-described journalist, Credlin has been described as a partisan. Crikey's Paula Matthews wrote in February 2017 that Credlin's support for Tony Abbott and criticism of then Prime Minister Malcolm Turnbull "takes media partisanship to its extreme" and represents "the channelling of a politician directly through a media mouthpiece".

Credlin was an ardent critic of the Victorian government response to the COVID-19 pandemic, and particularly of then-Victorian premier Daniel Andrews. Credlin has been lauded by fellow Sky News hosts for her aggressive questioning of Andrews during his daily press conferences during the pandemic.

In 2020, Credlin was criticised for claiming that South Sudanese Australians were not following government measures intended to stop the spread of COVID-19 due to problems with language proficiency, Credlin also claimed that South Sudanese migrants were "poorly-assimilated" and had ignored restrictions in an "end-of-Ramadan feast". Credlin's statement was criticised in the media, with SBS News noting that the vast majority of South Sudanese people are actually Christians. Credlin subsequently apologised for her comments.

In November 2020, Credlin compared COVID-19 lockdowns to the inquiry into the conduct of Australian SAS forces in Afghanistan.

During 2020, former Labor Prime Minister Kevin Rudd started a petition for a Royal Commission into Murdoch owned media. Credlin claimed that the petition was a "data harvesting exercise" of email addresses by Rudd intended for political uses. Later, as part of a confidential settlement regarding defamation, Credlin in February 2021 made an apology to Rudd on Sky News for her comments.

In May 2021 she was accused of inciting violence by suggesting Labor leaders Daniel Andrews and Anthony Albanese be "whacked" with "baseball bats". In November 2021, she joined anti-vaccine mandate protests in Melbourne, where members of the crowd carried prop gallows and chanted anti-Andrews slogans.

Credlin became a columnist for The Australian newspaper in July 2021. Her arrival at that paper prompted Niki Savva to leave the paper and join The Age and The Sydney Morning Herald.

== Criticisms and controversies ==
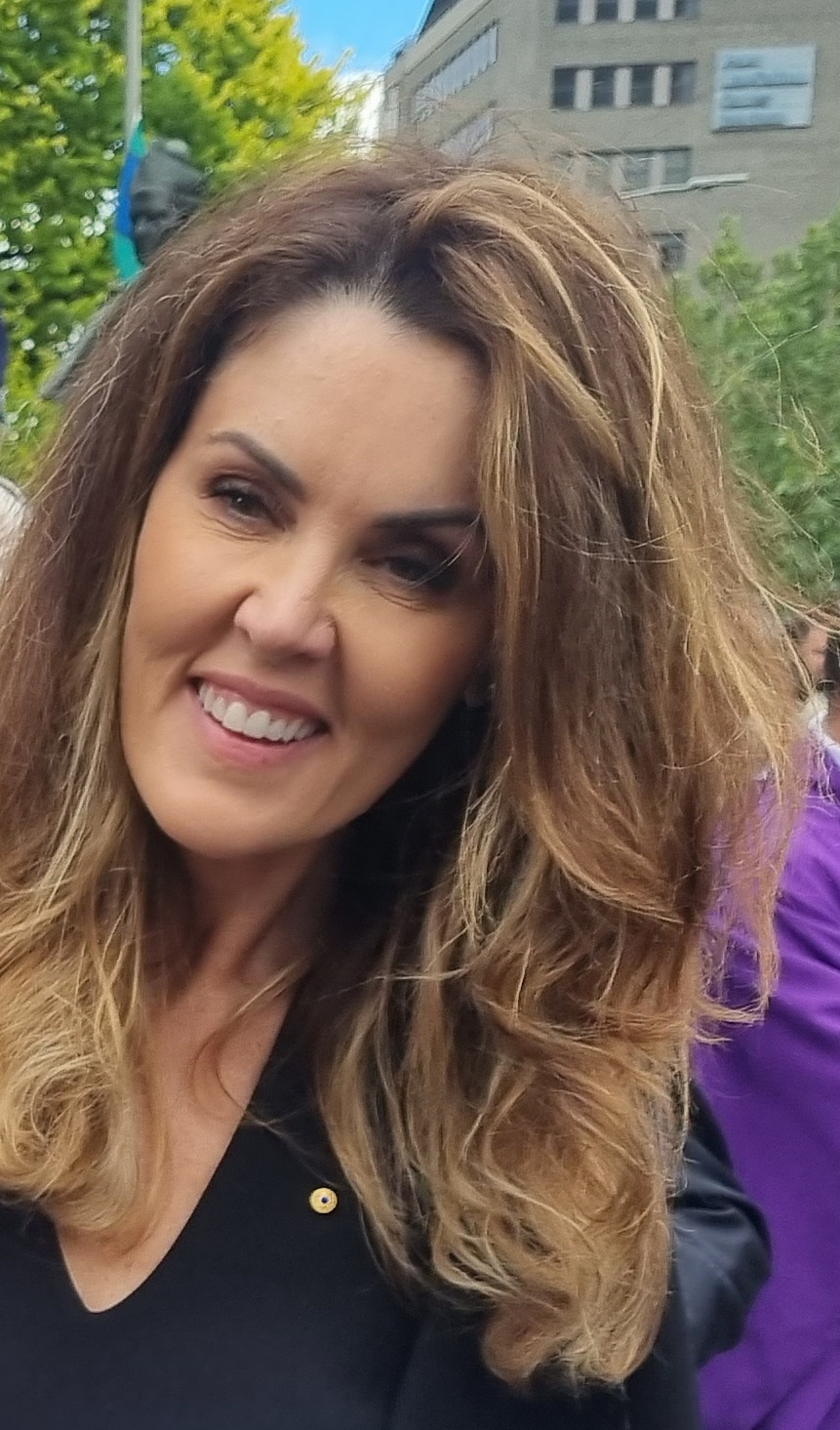

Credlin has frequently played a role in internal Liberal Party divisions. In 2024 it was revealed that she provided extensive advice to expelled Liberal Party Member Moira Deeming, in her bid to remain in the Victorian Liberal Party, against the wishes of leader John Pesutto. She also provided a reference for Deeming when she lost her preselection ahead of the 2026 Victorian state election.

Most notably, Credlin has been an ardent critic of former Liberal Prime Minister Malcolm Turnbull, who defeated her former boss Tony Abbott for the liberal Party leadership.

Like Abbott, Credlin is a member of the right faction of the Liberal Party, and a frequent critic of moderates within the party.

== Honours ==
In June 2021, Credlin was appointed an Officer of the Order of Australia in the 2021 Queen's Birthday Honours for "distinguished service to parliament and politics, to policy development, and to the executive function of government".

== Personal life ==
Credlin is married to Brian Loughnane, a former federal director of the Liberal Party of Australia, since December 2002. They had worked together in the Victorian office of the Liberal Party during the campaign for the 2001 federal election. They have no children.

In 2013, Credlin pleaded guilty to a drink-driving offence, recording a blood alcohol level of 0.075, but did not have a conviction recorded against her.
