= The Cabinet (TV series) =

Australian news panel TV series

- The Cabinet title card
- Genre: Current affairs, commentary
- Presented by: Kristina Keneally; Peter Reith; Helen Coonan; Craig Emerson
- Country of origin: Australia
- Original language: English

Production
- Running time: 60 minutes (inc. adverts)

Original release
- Network: Sky News Australia
- Release: 18 August 2014 – 2015

The Cabinet is an Australian television program, which premiered on 18 August 2014 on Sky News Australia. The program sees two former Labor Party politicians Kristina Keneally and Craig Emerson discuss political issues of the week with two former Liberal Party politicians Peter Reith and Helen Coonan.

The program is notable for not having an anchor or moderator, as the four commentators control the debate themselves and take turns throwing to commercial breaks throughout the program.

The program airs sporadically as a fill-in program on Sky News, and doesn't have a permanent weekly timeslot. Peter Beattie filled in for Keneally on an episode which aired on 2 April 2015.

Despite no official confirmation of the program's cancellation, it has not aired after 2015.
