= Kieran Gilbert =

Australian journalist

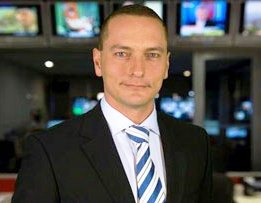
- Education: Charles Sturt University; University of Sydney
- Occupation: Journalist
- Years active: 2002–present
- Employer: Sky News Australia
- Known for: Journalism, TV presenting
- Relatives: Tim Gilbert (brother)
- Website: Kieran Gilbert profile

Kieran Gilbert is an Australian journalist currently serving as chief political reporter for Sky News Australia. Gilbert attended Patrician Brothers' College, Fairfield.

== Career ==
Gilbert holds a Master of International Studies from the University of Sydney and a Bachelor of Arts (Communications) from Charles Sturt University. Gilbert worked at Sydney radio station 2UE including as breakfast news editor before joining Sky News in 2002. Gilbert is a member of the Canberra Press Gallery.

At Sky News, he is the anchor of AM Agenda, and became co-host of First Edition with Nina Stevens on 17 March 2014 following the departure of Michael Willesee. Gilbert co-hosts from Canberra while Stevens presents from Sydney. Brooke Corte replaced Stevens as Gilbert's co-host in 2016. Gilbert is currently the host of Sunday Agenda and Afternoon Agenda on Sky News Australia.

Gilbert received the Department of Foreign Affairs' Elizabeth O'Neill Journalism Award in 2009.

== Personal life ==
Gilbert is the brother of television presenter Tim Gilbert. They are of Irish and Lebanese descent.
