= Keneally and Cameron =

Australian television news program

- Cameron (left) and Keneally during first episode of the program
- Genre: News, Current Affairs, Commentary
- Presented by: Kristina Keneally; Ross Cameron
- Country of origin: Australia
- Original language: English

Production
- Running time: 2 hours

Original release
- Network: Sky News Australia
- Release: 19 September 2014 – 27 March 2015

Related
- The Contrarians; The Friday Show

Keneally and Cameron is an Australian television news and commentary program broadcast weekly on Sky News Australia from 2014 to 2015, co-hosted by former NSW Premier Kristina Keneally and former Federal Liberal Minister Ross Cameron. The show was a replacement of axed format The Contrarians, which Keneally and Cameron had co-hosted since mid-2014.

The series focused on mainly political topics, with the co-hosts joined by different newsmakers, politicians and commentators throughout the show, and discussed the issues of the week. The program aired at 4pm on Friday afternoons. The program had news updates from a Sky News presenter every half-hour throughout the show.

The final segment of the show was The Team Australia Awards, named after a phrase coined by Prime Minister Tony Abbott shortly before the program premiered, in which Keneally, Cameron and their guests give awards to prominent Australians or groups. These awards included positive awards such as 'Team Australia MVP' to anyone the hosts thought made a positive contribution during the week, and negative awards including a yellow card and red card given to people who caused controversy or did something wrong during the week.

Tweets were also read out during the show from viewers using the show's hashtag. The program was broadcast from the Sky News centre in the Sydney suburb of Macquarie Park.

== Ending of program ==
The program last aired on 27 March 2015 with Janine Perrett filling in for Keneally who was on holidays. It was replaced by a two-hour news bulletin on 3 April (which was a public holiday), and again by a new program called The Friday Show hosted by Janine Perrett on 10 April.

It was reported that the show ended due to Keneally being unhappy with the way the program portrayed her. Keneally was named co-host of a new daytime program To The Point, while Cameron remained a contributor to other Sky programs.
