= Janine Perrett =

Australian journalist and commentator (born 1961)

- Born: 13 May 1961 (age 65); Warrnambool, Australia
- Occupations: Television presenter, journalist, commentator
- Years active: 1979–2019
- Known for: The Small Business Show (1994–2002); The Perrett Report (2010–2015); The Friday Show (2015–2019)
- Website: Janine Perreet bio

Janine Perrett is an Australian journalist and commentator who has worked across newspapers, radio and television for four decades. She currently works for ABC TV after working as a television presenter for Sky News Australia, until December 2019.

== Career ==
Perrett began working for The Australian newspaper in 1979, was a business reporter at the paper's Melbourne and Sydney bureaus and, in 1984, was appointed London correspondent. From 1985 to 1989, she was US correspondent for the paper, covering everything from US Presidential elections and the space shuttle disaster to unrest in Haiti, Panama and Chile. In 1989, Perrett worked as a business news editor for The Sydney Morning Herald, before moving to television as a reporter for the Nine Network's Business Sunday.

In 1994 Perrett founded Nine's The Small Business Show, which she anchored for its entire run until 2002, while also reporting for the Business Sunday and Sunday programs on Nine.

From 2003 to 2006 she was a guest presenter on ABC radio, and was a columnist for The Sydney Morning Herald.

In 2007 Perrett was awarded the John S. Knight Journalism Fellowship from Stanford University in California to study for a year.

In May 2010 Perrett joined Sky News Business to host a nightly program The Perrett Report. Perrett has appeared as a panelist on numerous Sky News programs, including weekly appearances on Paul Murray Live. Perrett also serves as substitute host of Paul Murray Live. Ahead of the 2013 Australian federal election, Perrett was the host of the short run series Saturday Live, which returned for the 2016 Australian federal election.

From 10 April 2015 Perrett was host of new weekly format The Friday Show on Sky News, which abruptly replaced the axed program Keneally and Cameron. In 2016 and 2017, she presented The Perrett Report on Sunday evenings and was also a nightly panelist on The Last Word.

Perrett was the Australia Day ambassador for Dubbo, New South Wales in 2015 and Broken Hill in 2017. From February to October 2018, she hosted Heads Up on Sky News, until the program was axed.

In August 2021 Perrett guest hosted the ABC's Media Watch while host Paul Barry was recovering from a bike injury.
