= To the Point (TV program) =

2015 Australian TV program

- Peter van Onselen and Kristina Keneally on set
- Genre: News, current affairs, commentary
- Presented by: Peter van Onselen (2015–2017); Kristina Keneally; Laura Jayes
- Country of origin: Australia
- Original language: English
- No. of seasons: 3

Production
- Running time: 30 minutes (inc. adverts)

Original release
- Network: Sky News Australia
- Release: 1 June 2015 – 13 November 2017

Related
- Lunchtime Agenda; PVO NewsDay

To the Point is an Australian television political commentary program that was broadcast 4 times weekly on Sky News Australia. The program was originally hosted by Kristina Keneally and Peter van Onselen. Van Onselen left the program in October 2017, replaced by Laura Jayes. The program premiered on 1 June 2015 and covers a range of political news as well as commentary and analysis from the hosts, plus guest contributors.

The program replaced Lunchtime Agenda in the 1:30 pm AEST timeslot and serves as a lead-in to Parliament Question time during parliamentary sitting weeks. The program airs in between PVO NewsDay, which van Onselen hosts solo.

It is broadcast from the Sky News centre in the Sydney suburb of Macquarie Park. Laura Jayes filled in as a guest co-host before becoming permanent co-host in October 2017.

For the 2016 election campaign, To the Point was extended to a one-hour program and from 16 May was moved to 1 pm AEST.

The program was suspended by Sky News on 14 November 2017, due to Keneally announcing her candidacy for the Bennelong by-election as a Labor candidate.
