= Peter van Onselen =

Australian political academic (born 1976)

- Born: 1976 (age 49–50); Sydney, New South Wales, Australia
- Education: Bachelor of Arts, Masters, PhD
- Alma mater: University of New South Wales; University of Western Australia
- Occupations: Journalist; Author; Academic; Commentator
- Known for: 10 News First; The Project

Peter van Onselen is an Australian academic, author, commentator, and political journalist. He is professor of politics and public policy at the University of Western Australia, and as of May 2025 he is political editor of Daily Mail Australia, having started in the position on 29 April 2024.

He was previously a weekly columnist at The Australian newspaper. Between 2010 and 2017, he hosted several programs at Sky News Australia. From 2018 to 2023 he served as Network 10's political editor and as a co-host of TV show The Project.

== Early life ==
Van Onselen was born in 1976 in Sydney and grew up in Coogee in the eastern suburbs of Sydney. He graduated from Scots College in Bellevue Hill in 1993, later continuing his studies via the University of New South Wales and the University of Western Australia.

He was awarded a PhD in political science from the University of Western Australia, converting his dissertation into a book. Van Onselen also holds a Bachelor of Arts with first-class honours in political science, majoring in philosophy, and a Masters in Policy Studies (with Distinction). Both degrees were obtained from the University of New South Wales. He has also completed a Master of Commerce (with Distinction) and was included in the Dean's honours list.

== Career ==
Before completing his PhD and commencing his academic career, van Onselen worked for Tony Abbott as an adviser when Abbott was the Minister for Workplace Relations in the Howard government in 2001. Van Onselen also previously worked as an intelligence analyst at the New South Wales Crime Commission.

=== Academic career ===
Van Onselen began an academic career at University of New South Wales in 2002, and became an associate professor at Edith Cowan University in 2004, organising the politics and government program. From 2007 to 2008, van Onselen presented stories on the Nine Network's Sunday and wrote a column for The Bulletin. In early 2011, van Onselen left Edith Cowan University to become a Winthrop Professor and Foundation Chair of Journalism at the University of Western Australia (UWA).

Van Onselen has written several politically themed books, including John Winston Howard (co-written with Wayne Errington), which was rated by The Wall Street Journal Asia as the best biography of 2007. Van Onselen has also written numerous refereed journal articles and conference papers, including articles for the Australian Journal of Political Science, the British Journal of Legislative Studies. He has also written columns and opinion pieces for a range of newspapers, including The Sydney Morning Herald, The Age, the Australian Financial Review, The Canberra Times and The Courier-Mail.

In May 2018, he was appointed Professor of Policy at Griffith Business School, Griffith University, Brisbane.

As of May 2025 he is Winthrop Professor of Politics & Public Policy at UWA.

=== Media career ===
Van Onselen has featured as a television commentator across numerous broadcasters, including as a panelist for state, federal and United States election coverages for both the Seven Network and Nine Network. In 2008, Van Onselen was a special investigator for the Perth edition of A Current Affair. He also presented cover stories for the Sunday program on the Nine Network in 2007 and 2008.

In 2009, Van Onselen joined The Australian as contributing editor. He wrote his last column for the paper in April 2024.

For the 2010 federal election he was the host of the National Tally Room panel for Sky News Business. The coverage was plagued by technical errors, and was satirised by the ABC1 comedy group The Chaser during their election parody program Yes We Canberra!.

Following the 2010 election, Van Onselen became a regular presenter at Sky News, co-hosting Australian Agenda from 2010 as well as his own programs The Contrarians and The Showdown.

In 2014, Van Onselen stepped down from hosting The Contrarians (which would later become Keneally and Cameron) and The Showdown was axed, when he was given his own four-times-weekly primetime program PVO Newshour, which premiered on 20 January 2014.

On 1 June 2015, Van Onselen voluntarily moved his program from primetime to daytime, with the program being retitled PVO NewsDay. He also co-hosted To The Point with Kristina Keneally, which aired in between his self-titled daytime show. In November 2015, Foxtel confirmed that PVO NewsDay would return for a second season in 2016.

In July 2016, Van Onselen added a fourth hosting role at Sky News, presenting morning program Sunday Edition. but relinquished the role in February 2017. In October 2017, it was announced that Van Onselen would step down from all his Sky News programs, to become a contributing editor to Sky News as well as revive The Contrarians as a weekly format. However, it was subsequently announced Van Onselen had left Sky News after his contract expired at the end of 2017.

In 2018, Van Onselen had a weekly segment on Radio National Breakfast, and appeared regularly on The Drum, Insiders, and The Project. On 3 December 2018, it was announced that Van Onselen was joining Network 10 as their political editor.

In January 2020, Van Onselen replaced Hamish Macdonald as co-host of The Sunday Project, with Macdonald becoming host of Q&A on ABC.. Van Onselen stepped aside as co-host of The Sunday Project 18 months later, continuing as Network 10 political editor and a co-host of The Project.

On 25 January 2022, Van Onselen was called out by The Project co-host Carrie Bickmore about an article he had written about 2021 Australian of the Year Grace Tame. He had described her behaviour as “childish”, after seeing her apparently deliberate refusal to smile for press photos with the Prime Minister, Scott Morrison, in Canberra. Van Onselen suggested that she would have done better not to attend the event.

Van Onselen was a personal friend of Christian Porter. When Porter was accused of rape, Van Onselen defended him. When Porter resigned from Parliament the politician thanked Van Onselen for this support in his farewell speech.

In 2023, Van Onselen was accused of breaching his departure agreement with Network Ten after he wrote a scathing opinion column about the network. On his departure from the network, Van Onselen signed an agreement agreeing not to disparage or ridicule Network Ten or its staff.

In a surprise announcement in mid-April 2024, tabloid media outlet Daily Mail Australia announced that Van Onselen would be joining them as their political editor from 29 April 2024. This news was greeted by the satirical newspaper The Chaser with the headline "The ‘Daily Mail of political commentators’ joins the Daily Mail". As of May 2025 he is still in the position.

== Personal life ==
Van Onselen is of Dutch heritage. He is married to Ainslie van Onselen, the chief executive of Chartered Accountants Australia and New Zealand, and has two daughters.

== Published works ==
- John Winston Howard: The Biography (with Wayne Errington, 2007) (Melbourne University Press)
- Howard's End: The Unravelling of a Government (with Philip Senior, 2008) (Melbourne University Press)
- Liberals and Power: The Road Ahead (editor, 2008) (Melbourne University Press)
- Professionals or Part-timers? Major Party Senators in Australia (2015) (Melbourne University Press) ISBN 978-0-52286-899-9
- Battleground: Why the Liberal Party Shirtfronted Tony Abbott (with Wayne Errington, 2015) (Melbourne University Press) ISBN 978-0-52286-971-2
