= Kristina Keneally =

Australian politician (born 1968)

The Honourable Kristina Keneally AO
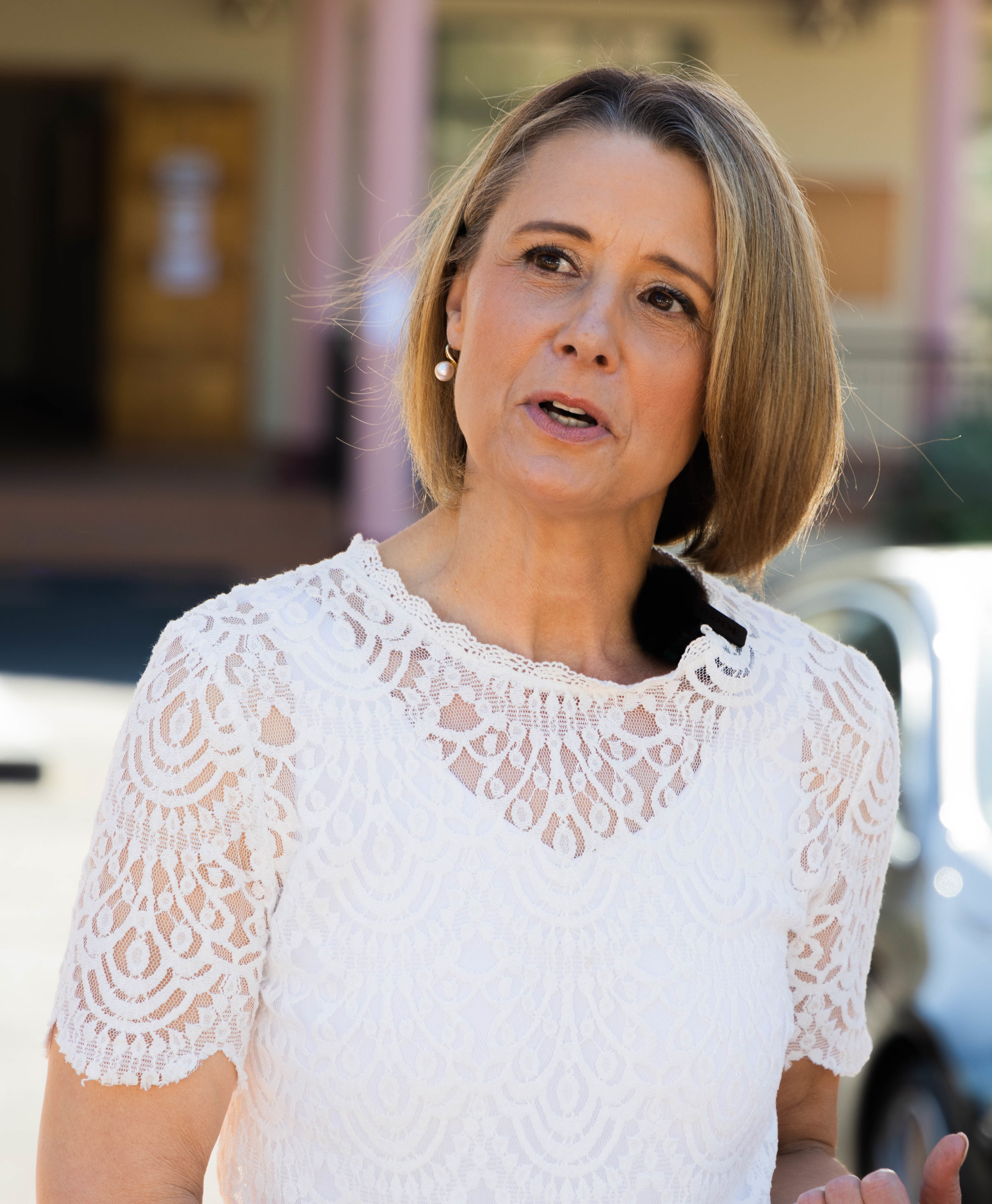
- Keneally in 2021

42nd Premier of New South Wales
- In office 4 December 2009 – 28 March 2011
- Monarch: Elizabeth II
- Governor: Marie Bashir
- Deputy: Carmel Tebbutt
- Preceded by: Nathan Rees
- Succeeded by: Barry O'Farrell

Senator for New South Wales
- In office 14 February 2018 – 13 April 2022
- Preceded by: Sam Dastyari
- Succeeded by: David Shoebridge

Deputy Leader of the Opposition in the Senate
- In office 30 May 2019 – 13 April 2022
- Leader: Penny Wong
- Preceded by: Don Farrell
- Succeeded by: Michaelia Cash

19th Leader of the Australian Labor Party in New South Wales
- In office 3 December 2009 – 31 March 2011
- Deputy: Carmel Tebbutt
- Preceded by: Nathan Rees
- Succeeded by: John Robertson

Member of the New South Wales Parliament for Heffron
- In office 22 March 2003 – 29 June 2012
- Preceded by: Deirdre Grusovin
- Succeeded by: Ron Hoenig

First Lady of Botany Bay
- In role 8 September 2012 – 9 September 2016
- Preceded by: Christine Hoenig
- Succeeded by: Council dissolved

Personal details
- Born: Kristina Marie Kerscher; 19 December 1968 (age 57) Las Vegas, Nevada, US
- Party: Labor (2000–present)
- Other political affiliations: Democratic (before 2000; US)
- Spouse: Ben Keneally
- Children: 3 (1 deceased)
- Education: University of Dayton (BA, MA); Marquette University; Australian Catholic University
- Website: Agency website Senate Profile

Kristina Marie Kerscher Keneally AO (born 19 December 1968) is an American-born Australian politician who served as the first female Premier of New South Wales from 2009 to 2011 and was later a Labor Senator for New South Wales from February 2018 until April 2022. She resigned from the Senate to contest the House of Representatives seat of Fowler, but was unsuccessful. From 2019 to 2022 she served as Deputy Leader of the Opposition in the Senate, Shadow Minister for Home Affairs, and Shadow Minister for Immigration and Citizenship.

Keneally was born in the United States to an American father and an Australian mother. She grew up in Toledo, Ohio, and is a graduate of the University of Dayton. After marrying an Australian, Ben Keneally, she settled in Australia permanently and became a naturalised citizen in 2000. Keneally was elected to the New South Wales Legislative Assembly seat of Heffron at the 2003 state election, succeeding Deirdre Grusovin after a controversial preselection process. After being re-elected to parliament at the 2007 state election, she became the Minister for Ageing and Disability Services and was subsequently appointed Minister for Planning by Premier Nathan Rees in 2008. She was also the state government's spokeswoman for World Youth Day 2008.

By December 2009 Keneally had emerged as the preferred leadership candidate of the Labor Right faction, and defeated incumbent Premier Nathan Rees (who had been in office for just 15 months) in a party room ballot, winning by 47 votes to 21. The Keneally Government went on to suffer a 16.5 per cent two-party preferred statewide swing at the 2011 state election – the biggest swing in Australian political history. She resigned as Labor Party leader on election night and was succeeded by John Robertson, who was elected unopposed, on 31 March 2011. She resigned from Parliament in June 2012.

In 2014 Keneally joined Sky News Live as a political commentator, later becoming co-host of To The Point. She took leave in November 2017 to stand as the Labor candidate for the Bennelong by-election, achieving a swing to Labor but losing to previous member John Alexander. In February 2018 she was appointed to the Senate to fill a casual vacancy caused by Sam Dastyari's resignation. After the 2019 leadership election, Keneally was selected as deputy Senate leader in the shadow cabinet of new Labor leader Anthony Albanese. She was also given the portfolios of Home Affairs and Immigration and Citizenship.

At the 2022 federal election Keneally, whose main residency is in the Northern Beaches, was parachuted over the local Labor branch candidate Tu Le, into the traditionally safe Labor seat of Fowler, which has one of the highest concentrations of Vietnamese Australians in the country. As a result of community backlash against her candidacy, Labor suffered a 15.6% swing against them, and she was defeated by independent challenger Dai Le, a Vietnamese-Australian journalist and former Liberal Party candidate.

Keneally was appointed as an Officer of the Order of Australia (AO) in the 2026 Australia Day Honours for "distinguished service to the people and the Parliament of Australia, to the Parliament of New South Wales, particularly as Premier, and to the community".

== Early life ==
Keneally was born Kristina Marie Kerscher in Las Vegas to an American father and an Australian mother (born in Brisbane). She lived briefly in Colorado but grew up in Toledo, Ohio, where she attended high school at Notre Dame Academy. While at Notre Dame she was twice awarded most valuable player (1985, 1986) in the academy's soccer team.

Upon graduating from Notre Dame, she undertook studies at the University of Dayton, also in Ohio. While there she became involved in student politics, and was involved in founding the National Association of Students at Catholic Colleges and Universities, serving as president of the group in 1990 and 1991. She graduated with a Bachelor of Arts in political science in 1991, was a registered Democrat and worked as an intern for the Lieutenant Governor of Ohio, Paul Leonard. In 1995 she graduated with a Master of Arts in religious studies. She later studied at Marquette University in Milwaukee, Wisconsin. After graduating from the University of Dayton she worked for a year as a volunteer teacher in New Mexico.

Keneally met her future husband, a member of the Australian Labor Party, Ben Keneally, at World Youth Day 1991 in Poland. She moved to Australia in 1994 to be with him, but they returned to the US, so Ben could take up a position with the Boston Consulting Group. They married there in 1996. They returned to Australia two years later, after their elder son was born. She became a naturalised Australian in 2000, the same year she joined the Labor Party. She renounced US citizenship in 2002, prior to standing for election.

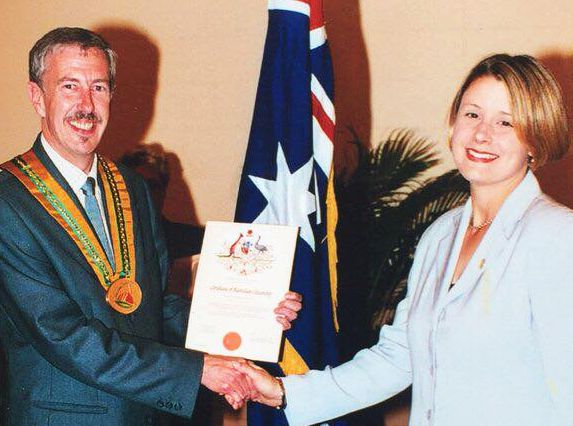
Keneally receiving her Certificate of Australian Citizenship from South Sydney Mayor John Fowler

After arriving in Australia she worked for the New South Wales branch of the Society of Saint Vincent de Paul as State Youth Coordinator before leaving full-time work to care for her children. She also briefly attended the Australian Catholic University in Strathfield, New South Wales.

== State politics ==
Keneally was elected to the seat of Heffron in the New South Wales Legislative Assembly in 2003, following a bitter pre-election battle with Deirdre Grusovin, the sister of senior Labor politician Laurie Brereton. It was in fact her husband Ben who was more interested in a political career, relying on his friendship with Joe Tripodi. However, the party's affirmative action rules required a female candidate, so Keneally ran instead. Before the election, Labor insiders were concerned that her strong American English accent would not play well with voters. Although she reportedly took elocution lessons to sound more Australian, to this day she speaks with a marked American accent.

As NSW Minister for Disability Services, Keneally undertook measures to rebuild outdated institutional residential facilities for people with disability, going back on promises made by her (non-immediate) predecessor Faye Lo Po'.

As NSW Planning Minister from August 2008, Keneally's department oversaw the local traffic diversions, and strict environmental management during construction, around the desalination pipeline works between Erskineville and Kurnell, approved by the department under the desalination pipeline project approval, granted by Frank Sartor, in November 2007.

On 17 November 2009, Keneally was appointed Minister for Infrastructure.

=== Premier ===
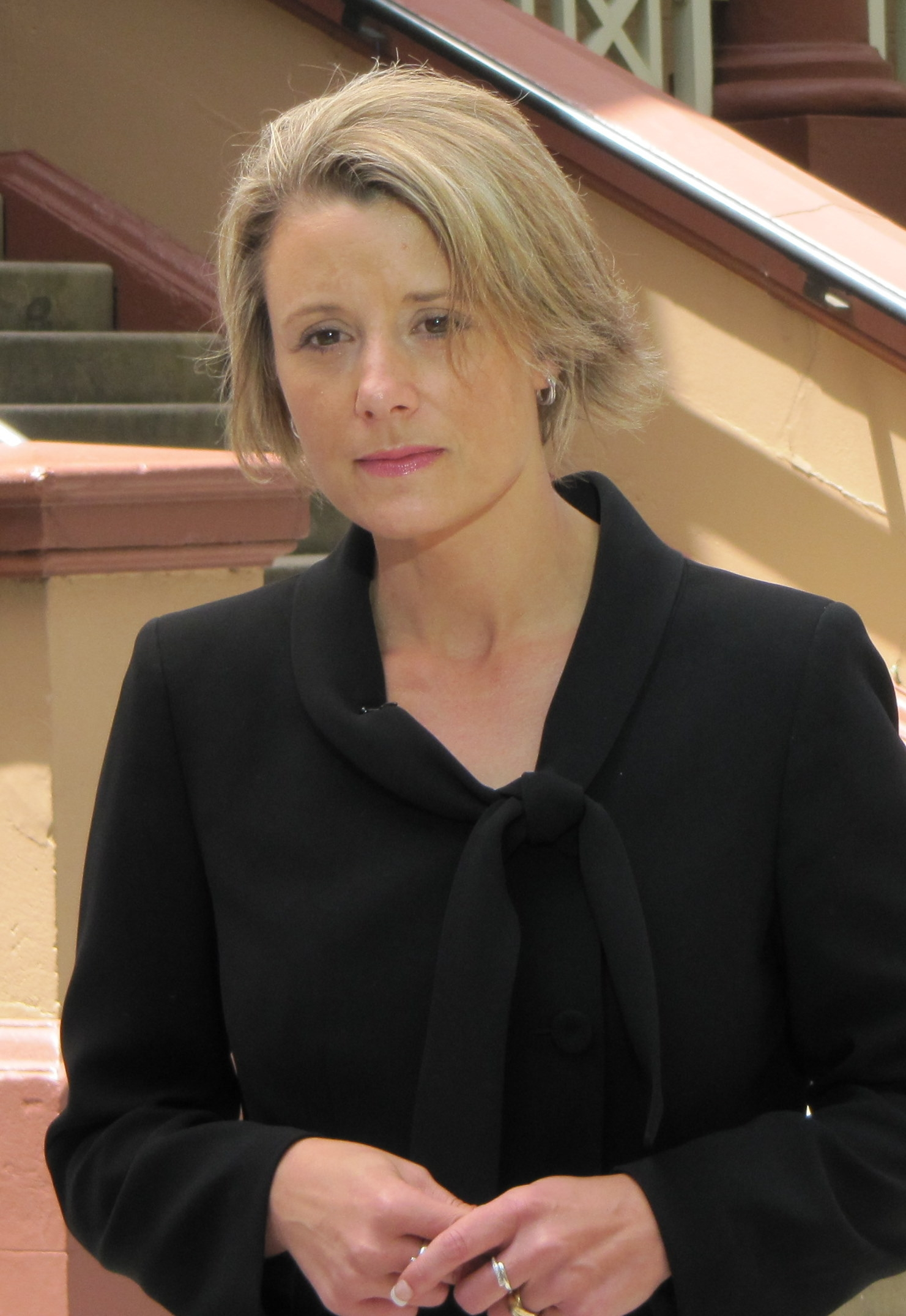
Keneally in December 2009, on the day she was sworn in as Premier

==== Challenges for leadership ====
On 3 December, Keneally narrowly defeated Sartor by two votes to become the Right's candidate in a leadership spill against Rees. After famously denying suggestions of a leadership spill against Rees, a spill was called and she defeated Rees in a party room ballot with a majority of 45–21. On 4 December 2009 Keneally was sworn in as the 42nd premier (and first female Premier) of New South Wales, by the State Governor, Marie Bashir, famously declaring "I'm nobody's puppet, nobody's girl" addressing allegations by Rees that she was chosen to act in the interest of disgraced fellow Terrigal faction members including Eddie Obeid. For the first time in Australian history, both the Premier and Deputy Premier (Carmel Tebbutt) of a state were women.

During her time as Premier Keneally was a supporter of the development of the Barangaroo headlands. To ensure the project was completed without delay, Keneally transferred various local government planning powers to the state government, created a new portfolio relating to the major development Barangaroo for which she took responsibility, and oversaw the project while Premier. Despite her dedication to the project she was criticised for a perceived conflict of interest in the development of Barangaroo worth over one million dollars and linked to installation of electric car infrastructure associated with the development and additionally for giving exemption to Barangaroo from environmental planning laws. In the eve of her time as premier, during investigations into corrupt dealings by former minister Ian Macdonald, Keneally refused to release a report made about him relating to misuse of taxpayer funds, though she was compelled to release the report to the Independent Commission Against Corruption (ICAC).

==== Party renewal ====
Keneally pushed to renew the Labor Party, with 23 members of the 50 caucus members retiring. Her push also included the resignation of the NSW Labor President, Bernie Riordan and retirements of Labor powerbrokers, Joe Tripodi and Eddie Obeid.

==== Electricity privatisation ====
On 14 December 2010 her government sold the first tranche of the partial privatisation of the state's electricity assets for $5.3 billion. Eight of the directors quit in protest over the sale of trading rights to the output of generators. After criticism of the privatisation, her Government abandoned the second stage of its electricity privatisation plan, as no companies bid.

On 22 December 2010 NSW Governor Marie Bashir prorogued Parliament on Keneally's request. This act normally takes place later than December prior to elections. There were accusations that Keneally tried to halt the electricity inquiry, which later proceeded.

In October 2011 the inquiry which the O'Farrell government set up reported to the NSW Liberal/National Government that the partial sale was "reasonable and appropriate".

==== Election defeat ====
Keneally led Labor into the 2011 state election. She was seeking to lead Labor to a fifth consecutive term in government, and also to become the second woman elected as a state premier in her own right, after Anna Bligh in Queensland.

But Keneally was a heavy underdog for most of the campaign. At one point polls showed Labor trailed the Barry O'Farrell-led Coalition by 26 points on the two-party vote and Keneally trailed O'Farrell by 16 points as preferred premier. Despite Keneally's efforts to rehabilitate Labor's image, opinion polls and commentators had almost universally written Labor off by the time the writs were dropped. An election-eve poll showed Labor's support at a record low of 23 per cent primary vote. The ABC's Antony Green estimated that Labor faced being cut down to as few as 13 seats.

In the 26 March election the Labor government was heavily defeated, suffering a swing of over 16 points on a two-party basis —the largest in a general election at any level in Australia since World War II. In the process, Labor lost many seats in its former western Sydney heartland. Ultimately, Labor was reduced to 20 seats (down from 48 at dissolution), its worst showing in over a century.

Keneally resigned as Premier and state Labor leader on election night and announced she would return to the backbench. On 11 June 2011, Keneally was granted by the Governor retention of the title "The Honourable". On 23 June 2012, Keneally announced her resignation from the New South Wales Parliament.

=== Labor government and ICAC ===
After the defeat of the Labor government, a series of investigations at the Independent Commission Against Corruption, found that Keneally ministers Obeid, Tripodi, and McDonald had acted in a corrupt manner. Counsel assisting the inquiry, Geoffrey Watson SC, said in 2012 of investigations into the actions taken by the men in 2010 that these inquiries were the most important investigation ever undertaken by the ICAC and that there was corruption on a scale probably unexceeded since the days of the Rum Corps.

Keneally appeared as a witness at the ICAC in March 2014 concerning investigations of her former colleagues. She said that she had had concerns about Obeid, Tripodi and Tony Kelly's lobbying and that their efforts had not influenced her. Asked if Obeid had "put her in her job" as premier, Keneally replied: "No, caucus did".

== Federal politics ==
=== Bennelong by-election, 2017 ===
In November 2017 Keneally was preselected by federal Labor as their candidate for the Bennelong by-election on 16 December. Despite picking up a five per cent two-party swing, she lost to the previous incumbent and Liberal candidate John Alexander.

=== Senator and opposition frontbencher, 2018–2022 ===
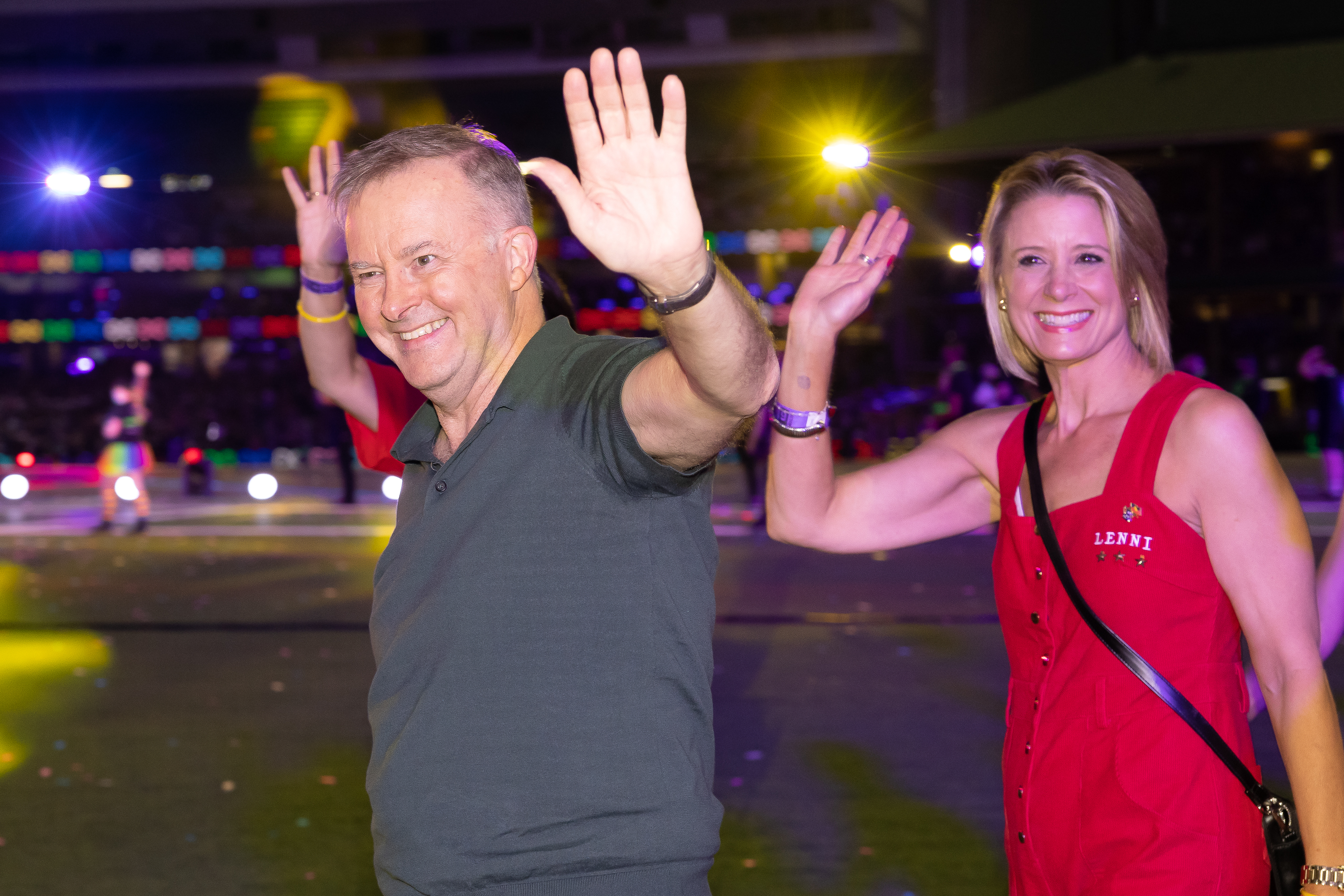
Keneally with Anthony Albanese at the Sydney Gay and Lesbian Mardi Gras in 2021

On 30 January 2018 the Labor Party announced that Keneally would fill the casual vacancy caused by the resignation of New South Wales senator Sam Dastyari, who resigned earlier that month. Keneally was formally appointed to the vacancy on 14 February 2018 and was sworn in as a senator the following day.

In June 2018 Keneally stated her opposition to mandatory reporting for Catholic priests who are informed of child sexual abuse in confession; she believes it is not the most effective way to prevent abuse. Keneally also attended the Rambam Israel Fellowship Program in Israel, sponsored by the Australia/Israel and Jewish Affairs Council. The lobby group funded "transport, accommodation, meals and other associated costs".

After the 2019 federal election, new leader Anthony Albanese expressed his intention to bring Keneally onto the frontbench despite opposition from the NSW Right faction. On 29 May Ed Husic announced his resignation from the frontbench and endorsed Keneally as his replacement. On 30 May, Labor's deputy leader in the Senate Don Farrell announced his resignation from the position to make way for a gender-balanced leadership team (since 2013, two of the four leadership positions were held by women). Keneally was subsequently announced as the new Deputy Leader of the Opposition in the Senate, Shadow Minister for Home Affairs, and Shadow Minister for Immigration and Citizenship in the Albanese shadow cabinet. She resigned from the senate on 13 April 2022.

=== Fowler candidacy, 2022 ===
In September 2021 it was reported that Keneally would seek preselection for the Division of Fowler in the House of Representatives to succeed retiring MP Chris Hayes at the 2022 federal election.

This occurred after Tu Le, a Vietnamese–Australian lawyer was endorsed by Hayes. Le was his preferred candidate due to her ability to reflect the multiculturalism of the area and her strong links to the community. The electorate of Fowler includes Sydney suburbs such as Cabramatta and Liverpool which has a population of over 50,000 Asian-Australians. Though Keneally moved to the seat after winning preselection, she did not have roots within the electorate and previously resided on Scotland Island in the Northern Beaches area of Sydney. The push for a white American-born woman with limited connections to a safe Labor seat primarily made up of people of Asian or Middle Eastern background, including a large proportion of recent migrants and refugees, was criticised by Labor MPs such as Anne Aly and Peter Khalil. Others, including former prime minister Paul Keating, supported Keneally, who was installed by party leadership without a pre-selection ballot. Independent Dai Le, a Vietnamese refugee and former Liberal Party councillor and candidate, was nominated for the seat, and defeated Keneally in one of only two Labor losses at the 2022 federal election.

== Private sector ==
=== Sporting roles ===
In 2011 Keneally became a director of Souths Cares, the nominated charity of the South Sydney Rabbitohs and Chair of the Basketball Australia board. She resigned from Parliament on 29 June 2012, to commence work as the Chief Executive of Basketball Australia. Keneally left Basketball Australia in April 2014 to spend more time with her family. In 2016 she was named as Chairperson of Souths Cares following incumbent chairman Nicholas Pappas stepping aside after eight years.

=== Political commentator and television host ===
In 2014 Keneally began a career as a media presenter. In May she spent a week filling in for Ita Buttrose on panel show Studio 10. In July, Keneally joined Sky News Australia and began co-hosting the panel program The Contrarians every Friday afternoon with Ross Cameron, before the pair were given their own self-titled program Keneally and Cameron. This program was axed in April 2015. Keneally joined Peter van Onselen as co-host of Sky News daytime program To The Point on 1 June 2015 which airs during PVO NewsDay. Keneally was also a regular presenter of primetime programs The Cabinet and Credlin & Keneally. Upon announcing her intention to stand for Federal parliament, she took leave from Sky News on the same day as her announcement on 14 November 2017.

Keneally regularly contributed to The Guardian Australia on a range of politico-social issues such as religion in politics, same-sex marriage, and asylum-seeking between December 2014 and June 2019.

Keneally was appointed CEO of the Sydney Children's Hospitals Foundation in November 2022.

== Personal life ==
Keneally is married to former Mayor of Botany Bay, Ben Keneally; together they have two sons. A daughter died at birth. Her husband is the nephew of Australian writer Thomas Keneally. Keneally is the patron of the Stillbirth Foundation Australia.

Keneally and her family previously lived in Pagewood, within the electorate of Heffron which she represented in state parliament. In 2016, Keneally and her husband sold their home and moved across Sydney to a rented home in Hunters Hill. Together they own a $1.8 million home on the isolated Scotland Island on the Northern Beaches of Sydney and a townhouse in Wollstonecraft purchased for $1.3 million in 2016. Keneally and her family moved to Liverpool prior to contesting the local seat of Fowler at the 2022 federal election.

In late 2022, Keneally was appointed as chief executive officer of the Sydney Children's Hospitals Foundation, which raises funds for children's healthcare.

Keneally is a supporter of the South Sydney Rabbitohs in the NRL.

== See also ==
- Keneally ministry
- 2011 New South Wales state election
- List of female heads of government in Australia

New South Wales Legislative Assembly
Preceded by Deirdre Grusovin	Member for Heffron; 2003–2012	Succeeded by Ron Hoenig
Political offices
Preceded by John Della Bosca	Minister for Ageing; 2007–2008	Succeeded by Paul Lynch
Preceded by John Della Bosca	Minister for Disability Services; 2007–2008	Succeeded by Paul Lynch
Preceded by Frank Sartor	Minister for Redfern-Waterloo; 2008–2011	Ministry abolished
Preceded by Frank Sartor	Minister for Planning; 2008–2009	Succeeded by Tony Kelly
Preceded by Joe Tripodi	Minister for Infrastructure; 2009	Succeeded by Tony Kelly
Preceded by Nathan Rees	Premier of New South Wales; 2009–2011	Succeeded by Barry O'Farrell
Party political offices
Preceded by Nathan Rees	Leader of the Australian Labor Party (NSW Branch); 2009–2011	Succeeded by John Robertson
Parliament of Australia
Preceded by Sam Dastyari	Senator for New South Wales; 2018–2022	Succeeded by David Shoebridge
