= Agenda (Australian TV program) =

Series of Australian news programs

- Also known as: AM Agenda; PM Agenda; Sunday Agenda; Weekend Agenda
- Genre: News, Current Affairs, Commentary
- Presented by: Kieran Gilbert (AM); Laura Jayes (Lunchtime); David Speers (PM); David Lipson (Saturday); Peter van Onselen (Sunday); Kristina Keneally (Sunday); Jim Middleton (Weekend)
- Country of origin: Australia
- Original language: English

Production
- Running time: 30 minutes – 2 hours

Original release
- Network: News24
- Release: 4 July 2010 – present

Agenda is the name given to a series of Australian television news and commentary programs, broadcast on News24 throughout the week. The Agenda series of bulletins serve as the channel's flagship program.

The series focuses on mainly political topics, and in each episode the host usually interviews a guest, and is then usually joined by either News24 contributors or politicians from opposing sides of politics debating the issues of the day.

With the exception of Sunday Agenda and the Thursday episode of PM Agenda, the program is broadcast live from the News24 studio at Parliament House in Canberra. The other programs are broadcast from the main News24 centre in the Sydney suburb of Surry Hills.

Lunchtime Agenda was ended on 29 May 2015, when it was replaced by To The Point co-hosted by Peter van Onslen and Kristina Keneally. Saturday Agenda ended in 2015, when its presenter David Lipson defected to the ABC and the format was eventually replaced by Pyne & Marles.

While the contemporary Australian Agenda debuted on 4 July 2010, the title had previously been used for a weekly interview program presented by John Gatfield in at least 2001. The edition rebranded as Sunday Agenda on 9 July 2016.

== Current variations ==
Program title	Duration	Host	Notes
AM Agenda	60 mins	Kieran Gilbert	
PM Agenda	120 mins	David Speers	This program is usually broadcast from the Canberra studio, however on Thursdays was broadcast from Sydney due to Speers hosting primetime program The Nation in another Sydney studio, however this ended in 2016, when The Nation was replaced by Speers Tonight. Extended to two hours from 2013. Also includes The Last Word.
Sunday Agenda	60 mins	Peter van Onselen; Kristina Keneally (2017–2018)	Sunday morning talk show from Sydney studios. Co-produced with The Australian, and features the newspaper's editor Paul Kelly as co-host. Debuted 4 July 2010 with David Speers originally as host. Formerly replayed at 1:30pm AEST. Previously titled Australian Agenda until 3 July 2016.
Weekend Agenda	120 mins	Jim Middleton	Began in July 2016 as a weekend extension of PM Agenda.

== Former variations ==
Program title	Duration	Host	Notes
Late Agenda	60 mins	Helen Dalley	The only primetime edition of Agenda. Ended and replaced with The Dalley Edition.
Lunchtime Agenda	30 mins	Laura Jayes	When Parliament is sitting, this program led directly into the live broadcast of Question time. Final episode aired 29 May 2015, when it was replaced by To The Point.
Saturday Agenda	30 mins	Chris Kenny (until June 2013); David Lipson (July 2013 – 2015)	Ended in late 2015. Replaced by Pyne & Marles.
New Zealand Agenda		James O'Doherty	Ran in 2018.

== See also ==
- List of Australian television series
