= News24 (Australian TV channel) =

Australian conservative pay TV news channel

- Type: News channel
- Country: Australia
- Broadcast area: Australia; New Zealand
- Headquarters: Surry Hills, New South Wales

Programming
- Language: English
- Picture format: 1080i HDTV (downscaled to 16:9 576i for the SDTV feed)

Ownership
- Owner: News Corp Australia
- Parent: Australian News Channel
- Sister channels: News24 Weather; News24 World

History
- Launched: 19 February 1996; 30 years ago
- Former names: Sky News Australia (1996–2026)

Links
- Website: www.news24.com.au

Availability

Terrestrial
- Freeview (Australia): Channel 56 (Regional Queensland, Regional Victoria, Southern NSW and ACT) (Northern NSW and Gold Coast)
- Foxtel (Australia): Channel 600 (HD)
- Sky Television (New Zealand): Channel 85

Streaming media
- Australia Channel: Watch live outside Australia
- Binge: Watch live within Australia
- Foxtel Go: Watch live within Australia
- News24.com.au: Watch live within Australia and New Zealand

News24 is an Australian conservative news channel owned by News Corp Australia. Originally launched on 19 February 1996, it broadcasts rolling news coverage throughout the day, while its prime time lineup is dedicated to opinion-based programs featuring a line-up of conservative commentators.

News24 is distributed on pay television in Australia and New Zealand, while a free-to-air version of the service, News24 Regional (which features programming from News24 and Fox Sports News) is distributed on digital terrestrial television by Network Ten Pty Ltd and selected WIN Television stations. The channel also operates two spin-off services, News24 Weather and world service News24 World (formerly A-PAC and Sky News Extra).

The channel was originally launched as Sky News Australia, a joint venture between British broadcaster BSkyB (thus making it a spin-off of the Sky News channel in the United Kingdom), Seven Network Limited, and Publishing and Broadcasting Limited (owner of the Nine Network), as Australian News Channel. The company was acquired by News Corp Australia in 2016. With the subsequent sale of Murdoch's remaining shares in Sky UK to Comcast, Sky News Australia no longer had any direct ties to its UK counterpart, but continued to use the Sky News branding under licence from Sky UK until 27 July 2026, when it rebranded as News24.

== History ==
News24’s parent company, Australian News Channel (ANC), was owned equally by British Sky Broadcasting, Seven Network Limited (later Seven Group Holdings then Seven West Media) and Publishing and Broadcasting Limited (later PBL Media then Nine Entertainment), each with a 33% stake in the company from its founding until December 2016, when it was acquired by News Corp Australia.

News24 launched as Sky News Australia at 5 pm on 19 February 1996, as the first Australian-produced television news channel. The channel aired its 50,000th unique newscast on 23 April 2003 at 11 am. Sky News was added to Austar on 1 April 2000.

2004's Sky News logo

In 2004, Sky News began broadcasting Sky News Active, its on-demand interactive TV news service. In 2008, Sky News launched the Sky News Business Channel, and on 20 January 2009, Sky News launched Australian Public Affairs Channel (A-PAC). It began widescreen broadcasting on 17 May 2009.

The logo introduced in 2010.

In 2013, Sky News Australia was granted A$20 million in funding from its parent company to be used over three years.

News24 began broadcasting in high definition on 1 December 2015.

With the sale of Murdoch's remaining shares in Sky UK to Comcast in 2018, News24 no longer has any direct ownership ties to its UK counterpart, but continued to use the Sky News branding under licence from Comcast.

The logo introduced in 2018.

In February 2018, Sky News Australia launched a digital-first brand and content platform called 2600. The online political newsletter is sent out daily with breaking news from Canberra.

In November 2018, Sky News terminated the contract of former Liberal Party MP and late-night presenter Ross Cameron for using sinophobic language to describe Chinese people.

In mid-2019, the channel began expanding its digital operations. This included a content partnership with YouTube, Microsoft News, Facebook and Taboola. That led to new, opinion-focused videos being uploaded more frequently and across News Corp platforms, after having previously not uploaded any videos from February 2017 to April 2019.

In July 2024, it was reported that the network would relocate to the News Corp Australia headquarters in Surry Hills in 2025.

=== Rebranding as News24 ===
The logo after the rebranding in 2026.

News Corp's license to carry the Sky News brand expired in late 2026. As the expiration date approached, Sky Limited showed little interest in renewing the agreement between the companies, with some reports suggesting this was due to the change in ownership and divergence in editorial direction between the brands. Whereas Sky News UK is required to provide an impartial service under British broadcasting regulations, Sky News Australia has developed increasingly conservative content in its flagship opinion and discussion programs. Names News Corp were reported to be considering rebranding the network included "Australian News Channel" or a name containing either "Fox News"—derived from the U.S. sister network owned by Fox Corporation, or "Talk"—coming from News UK brand Talkradio, which operates a spin-off internet television service.

On 20 February 2026, during the official opening of their new Surry Hills headquarters to mark the channel's 30th anniversary, Sky News Australia announced that it would rebrand as News24. The rebrand was implemented on 27 July 2026. The new logo incorporates part of the News Corp wordmark, which itself is based on the handwriting of company founder Rupert Murdoch; News Corp described the new name as transitioning Sky News from being an Australia-centric television channel to a "globally ambitious", multi-platform news brand.

== Programming ==
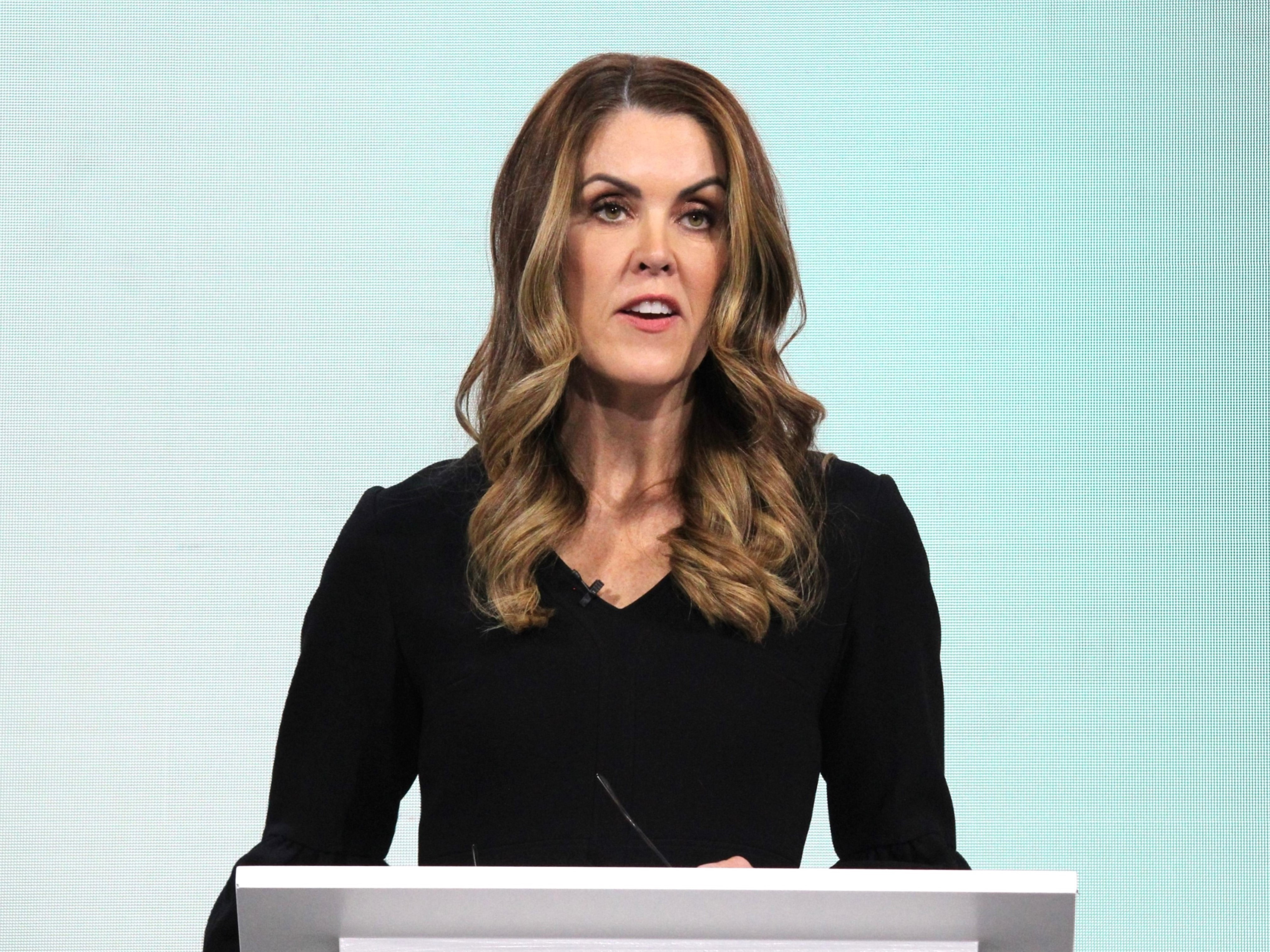
Peta Credlin, host of Credlin, in 2025

News24 programming consists of a mix of live news bulletins, live broadcasts from events (such as Parliament Question Time and selected press conferences), original commentary panel programs. Sky News has broadcast every sitting of Question Time from the House of Representatives since its launch in 1996.

In 2013, ahead of the federal election, Sky News Australia began to pivot its prime time programming to feature live current affairs programming, adding the new programme Paul Murray Live and the weekly Viewpoint with Chris Kenny. It also added a new sportscast presented by James Bracey, and named Stan Grant the new presenter of Newsnight. Following the acquisition of the channel by News Corp, News24 began to increasingly feature conservative, opinion-based programming during the evening and prime time hours.

On weekdays, throughout most of the day, rolling news coverage is presented from one of News24's studios. From 5 pm (AEST/AEDT), commentary programs begin, and continue through primetime until 11 pm AEST/AEDT. Most of these programs are presented by conservative commentators discussing the news of the day, often with a panel of other commentators, and feature a news update at the beginning of the program (and sometimes further updates during the program). Rolling news continues from 11 pm AEST/AEDT before coverage switches to an overnight simulcast of Sky News UK at 1 am AEST/AEDT.

Beginning in 2007, News24 aired local breakaway programming for New Zealand viewers in primetime, filmed at Prime NZ's Auckland studios and produced from Sydney. One of these programs, Prime News – First at 5:30, was also simulcast to Australian viewers. The debut of Sky News NZ Evening News was watched by just 1,500 viewers and panned by critics. Sky News Australia continued to produce news programming for Prime until 2015, when MediaWorks New Zealand took over production of Prime's news programming via its own news department. On 16 June 2018, Sky News Australia premiered New Zealand Agenda, a political program hosted by New Zealand bureau chief James O'Doherty from Wellington, New Zealand.

=== Current programmes ===
Daytime
- First Edition with Peter Stefanovic (Monday to Friday)
- Weekend Edition with Alex Thomas (Saturday to Sunday)
- News24 Breakfast with Jaynie Seal and Samantha Chiari (Only on News24 Regional & News24 Weather) (Monday to Friday)
- AM Agenda with Laura Jayes (Monday to Friday)
- Weekend Agenda with Andrew Clennell (Saturdays)
- Outsiders with Rowan Dean, Rita Panahi, and James Morrow (Sundays)
- Business Weekend with Ross Greenwood (Sundays)
- NewsDay with Tom Connell and Ashleigh Gillon (Monday to Friday)
- Weekend Live (Saturday to Sunday)
- Afternoon Agenda with Kieran Gilbert (Monday to Friday)
- Politics Now (Monday to Friday)
- Business Now with Ross Greenwood (Monday to Friday)
- The Kenny Report with Chris Kenny (Monday to Thursday)
- NZ Edition with Jack Nyhof (Saturday to Sunday)

Nighttime

- Credlin with Peta Credlin (Monday to Friday)
- The Bolt Report with Andrew Bolt (Monday to Thursday)
- The Steve Price Show with Steve Price (Fridays)
- The World According to Rowan Dean with Rowan Dean (Fridays)
- Opinionated with Danica De Giorgio (Fridays)
- The US Report with James Morrow (Fridays)
- Sharri with Sharri Markson (Monday to Thursday)
- Paul Murray Live with Paul Murray (Sunday to Thursday)
- The Rita Panahi Show with Rita Panahi (Monday to Thursday)
- The Late Debate with James Macpherson, Danica De Giorgio and Caleb Bond (Monday to Thursday)
- The Media Show with Jack Houghton (Fridays)
- The Papers with James Macpherson, Liz Storer and Caleb Bond (Fridays)
- In Conversation with Laura Jayes (Sundays)
- Danica and James with Danica De Giorgio and James Macpherson (Sundays)
- The Sunday Showdown with Caleb Bond (Sundays)
- Lefties Losing It with Rita Panahi (Sundays)
- The Royal Report (Sundays)
- NewsNight (Saturday to Sunday)

== Presenters and reporters ==
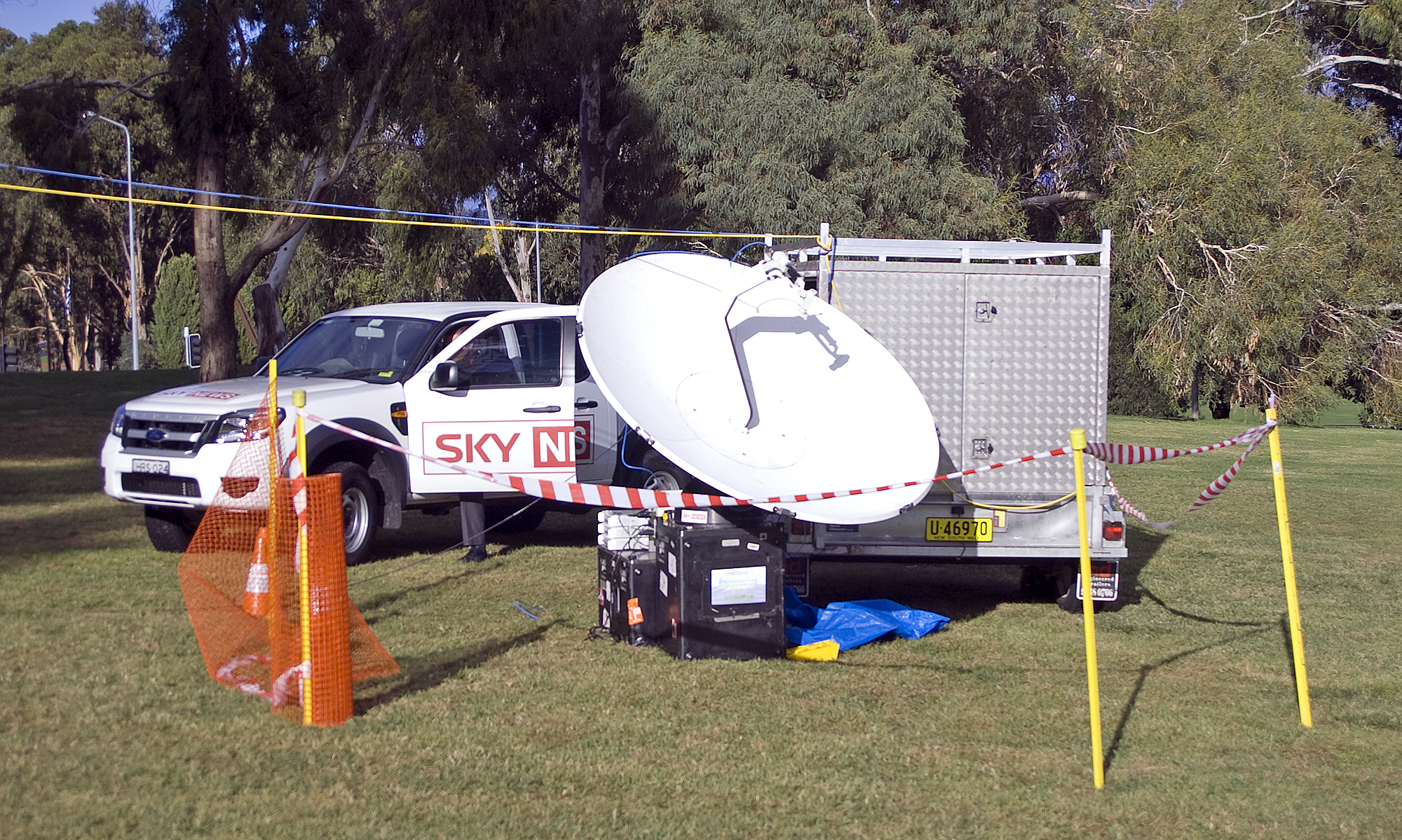
broadcast equipment

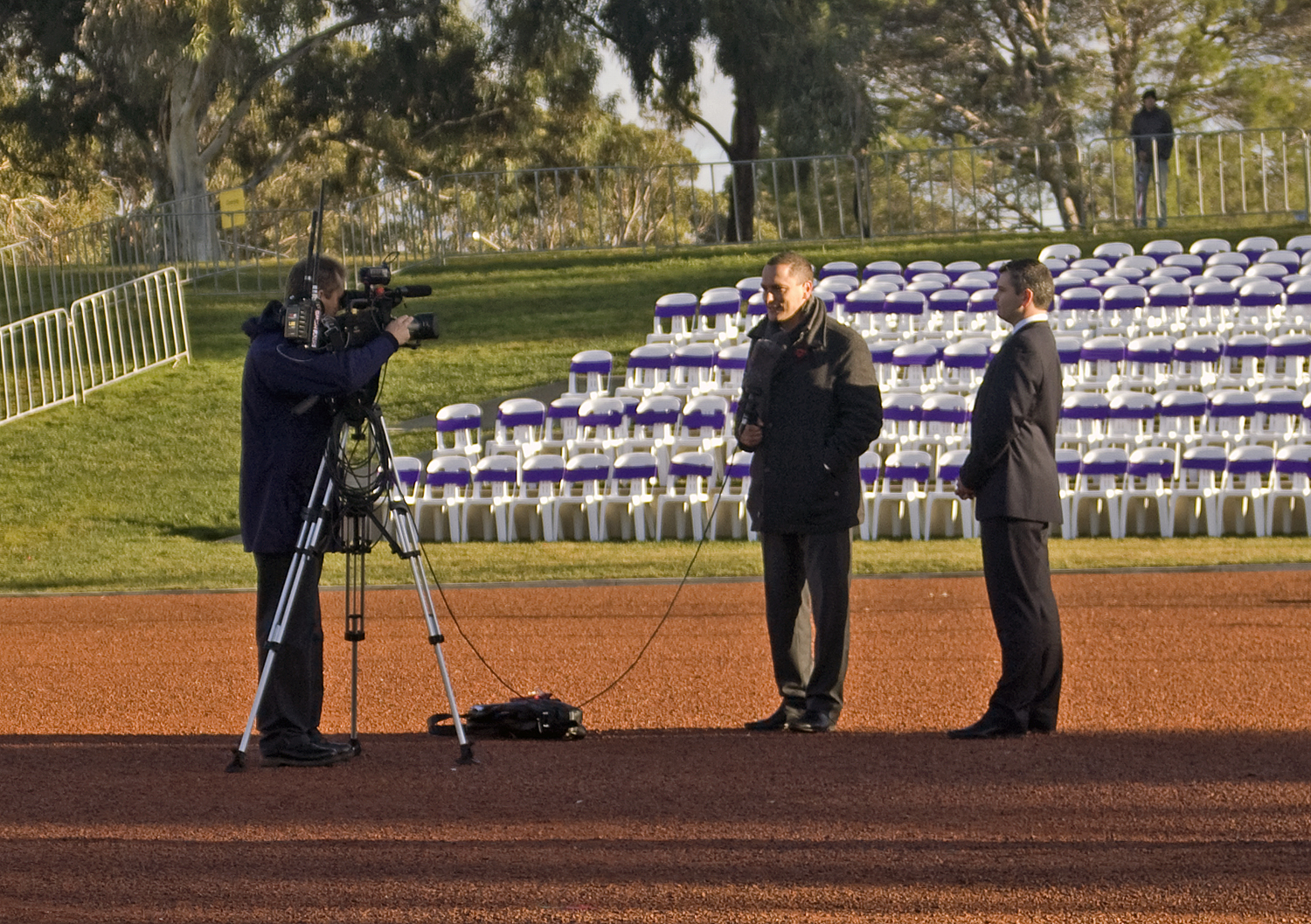
Kieran Gilbert, reporting from the Australian War Memorial in Canberra

=== News presenters ===
- Peter Stefanovic
- Jaynie Seal
- Laura Jayes
- Tom Connell
- Ashleigh Gillon
- Kieran Gilbert
- Tim Gilbert
- Kristie Lloyd
- Ortenzia Borre
- Rhiannon Elston
- Cheng Lei
- Candice Wyatt

=== Program presenters ===
- Rowan Dean
- Rita Panahi
- James Morrow
- Ross Greenwood
- Chris Kenny
- Peta Credlin
- Andrew Bolt
- Paul Murray
- Jack Houghton
- Jenna Clarke
- James Macpherson
- Sharri Markson
- Laura Jayes
- Kieran Gilbert
- Cheng Lei
- Danica Di Giorgio
- Caroline Di Russo
- Gabriella Power

=== Reporters ===
- Julia Bradley, Caroline Marcus and Crystal Wu – Sydney
- Georgie Dickerson, Holly Stearnes and Jack Nyhof – Melbourne
- Trudy McIntosh, Cameron Reddin and Reuben Spargo – Canberra
- Kaiser Shields and Harry Clarke – Brisbane
- Lauren Forbes – Gold Coast
- Monique Van Der Heyden – Adelaide
- Ciara Hain – Perth
- Matt Cunningham – Darwin
- Aspen Blomfield – Hobart
- Jack Nyhof – Wellington, New Zealand
- Staś Butler – Taipei, Taiwan
- Annelise Nielsen – Washington DC, United States

=== Former presenters and reporters ===
- Alan Jones
- Cory Bernardi (2023)
- John Gatfield (1996–2008) (now with Sky Racing) Co-anchored the first bulletin on 19 February 1996 with Juanita Phillips.
- Samantha Armytage
- Dan Bourchier (later with ABC News)
- Ross Cameron (2013–2018)
- Brooke Corte
- Freya Leach
- Helen Dalley
- Craig Emerson (resigned in protest over Blair Cottrell interview)
- Georgie Gardner (later with Nine News)
- Amy Greenbank (now with ABC News)
- Stan Grant (2013–2017)
- Leigh Hatcher
- Patricia Karvelas (now with ABC News) (2016–2017)
- Kristina Keneally (former Premier of New South Wales and Former Senator for New South Wales) (2014–2017)
- Chris Kohler (now with Nine News)
- David Koch (former Sunrise co-host on the Seven Network)
- Mark Latham (now a member of the New South Wales Legislative Council) (2016–2017)
- Prue Lewarne
- Samantha Maiden (resigned whilst suspended. Now with news.com.au)
- John Mangos
- Sharon McKenzie
- Piers Morgan
- Melanie McLaughlin (now with Seven News)
- Jim Middleton (now a Media Advisor for Climate 200)
- Erin Molan
- Kelly Nestor
- Janine Perrett
- Juanita Phillips (now with ABC News)
- Cameron Price (later with Seven News)
- Chris Roe
- Celina Edmonds (now with ABC News)
- Vanessa Grimm
- Nina Stevens (now with Seven News)
- Matt Shirvington (now with Sunrise on the Seven Network)
- Amber Sherlock (later with Nine News)
- David Speers (now with Insiders)
- Greg Thomson (resigned whilst suspended)
- Karen Tso (now with CNBC)
- Jacinta Tynan
- Peter van Onselen (2010–2017)
- Terry Willesee
- Michael Willesee Jr.
- Ahron Young
- Craig Norenbergs
- James Bracey (now with Nine News)
- Ticky Fullerton (now CEO of the Australian British Chamber of Commerce)
- Peter Gleeson
- Fiona Willan (now with ABC News)
- Olivia Caisley (now with ABC News)

== Bureaus ==
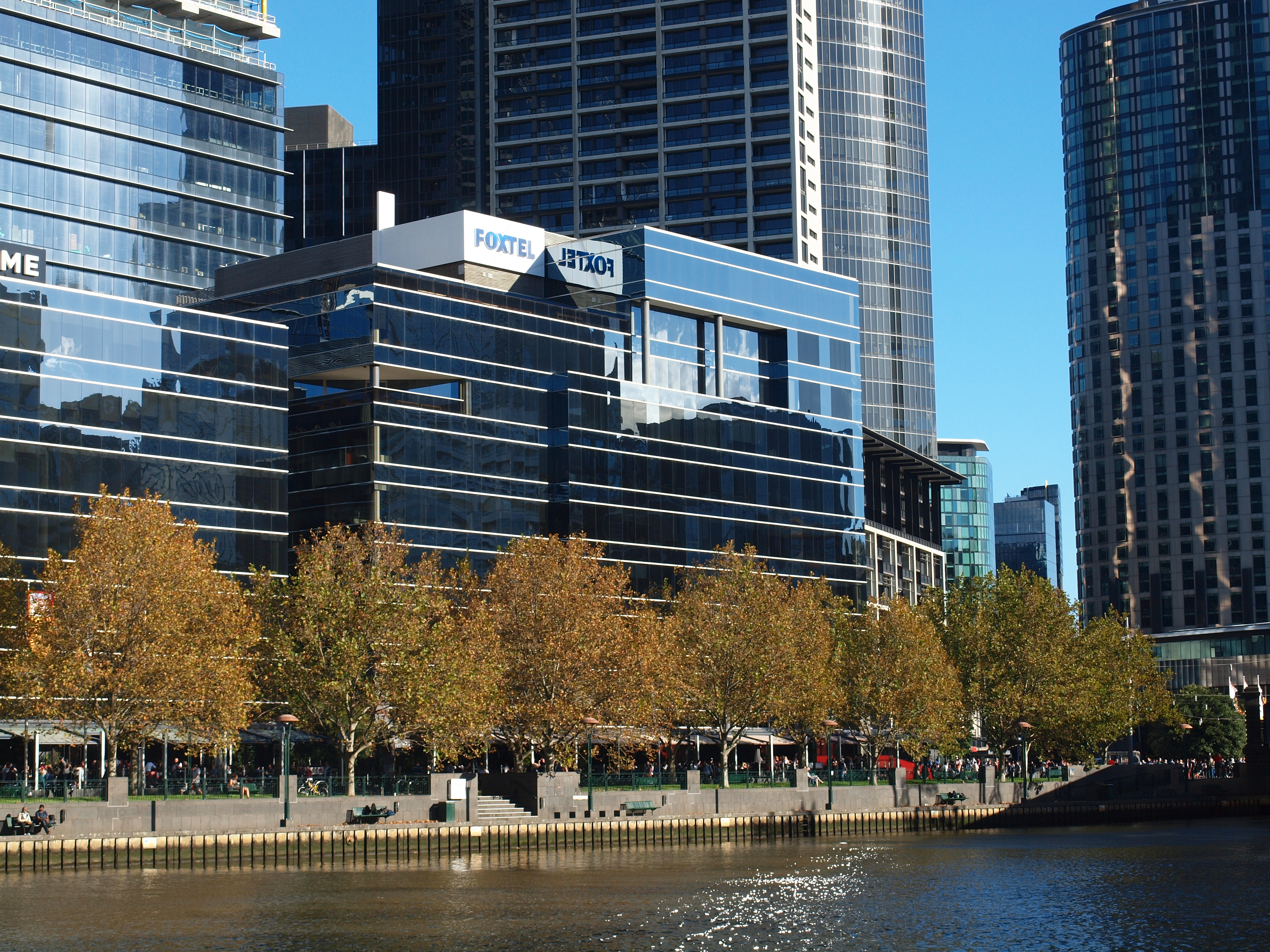
The News24 Melbourne bureau is within the Foxtel headquarters in Southbank, Victoria.

News24 has a bureau in every capital city in Australia, completing this with the opening of its Hobart studio in 2013. In 2016, it opened a bureau in Cairns, making it the first non-capital city bureau. In 2017, a Gold Coast bureau was opened marking the third non-capital city studio after Cairns and Geelong.

The base of News24 is in the Sydney suburb of Surry Hills, from which the majority of its news and programming is broadcast. Its Melbourne studio was upgraded in 2014, allowing it to be used as a secondary broadcast studio. Hinch Live became the first regular program to be broadcast from Melbourne.

The third major bureau is in Parliament House, Canberra, opened in 2000. Lyndal Curtis became Bureau Chief of in October 2015. Additionally News24 has a small office in the Channel Seven building in Martin Place, which includes a small street-level single camera studio which looks onto Elizabeth Street, Sydney.

Internationally, News24's only foreign bureau is in Wellington, New Zealand, opened in 2015.

== Resources ==
Apart from its own resources, at launch News24 used the news resources of its former parent companies Seven News, Nine News and Sky News UK, and Fox News Channel. ABC America and CBS were founding international partners of News24.

In 2010 it had agreements with CCTV China, ABC America, CBS, Reuters, APTN, Bloomberg, Dow Jones and Newshub, when it signed a four-year partnership deal with CNN International, commencing on 1 January 2011.

== Content ==
In 2017, Denis Muller, a senior research fellow at the University of Melbourne's Centre for Advancing Journalism, described the channel as having a "split personality", running straight news bulletins and reporting during the day with professional and independent journalists and presenters, while moving toward "right-leaning punditry" (which has been colloquially referred to by the media as "Sky after dark") in prime time.

In February 2021, Muller, commenting on former Prime Minister and former leader of the Australian Labor Party Kevin Rudd's statement that Sky News was following a pattern laid down by Fox News, described the nighttime programming of Sky News Australia as including "the unconstrained peddling of extreme right-wing propaganda, lies, disinformation, crude distortion of fact, and baseless assertions".

=== Political alignment and views ===
News24 has an editorial policy that follows a conservative, right-wing bias. Many of the presenters also have openly pro-Israel views. Coverage is frequently critical of Australia's main progressive political parties, Labor and the Greens in addition to the Moderate Faction of Liberal Party, while being supportive of right-wing parties such as the Liberal-National Coalition (except for the Moderate Faction ) and One Nation. Presenter Paul Murray has stated that "Sky News at night is a Liberal echo chamber". Drawing a strong comparison to Fox News, the network began moving towards panel-based programming from 2010, with most of its highest profile prime time commentators being conservative. Hosts Andrew Bolt and Paul Murray have been compared to Fox News presenters Bill O'Reilly and Sean Hannity respectively.

During the COVID-19 pandemic, Murdoch-owned outlets—including Sky News Australia commentators—dubbed Victoria premier Daniel Andrews a "dictator" for his local response. Andrews criticised the network in an interview, stating that "in Victoria, the haters hate and the rest vote Labor and that's fine by me. Call me what you want, what really matters is not that nonsense, that noise, that vitriol, that After Dark bullshit. That's all that it is – the worst of American politics imported into ours."

Andrew Bolt and Alan Jones frequently spread claims about the mental health of then-United States president Joe Biden, claiming he was unfit to be the president and suggesting he was suffering from dementia.

=== Misinformation and conspiracy theories ===
On 13 December 2020, Rowan Dean promoted the Great Reset conspiracy theory on Sky News Australia, claiming that "This Great Reset is as serious and dangerous a threat to our prosperity – to your prosperity and your freedom – as we have faced in decades".

As of February 2021, American far-right conspiracy theorist Alex Jones uses segments from Sky News Australia to back up his claims.

In July 2021, Alan Jones and Craig Kelly falsely claimed that United Kingdom data proved that getting vaccinated against COVID-19 would increase the likelihood of death due to COVID-19. The claim originated in The Daily Exposé, a British website known for promoting COVID-19 and anti-vaccine misinformation. The Daily Exposé's claim was debunked by the BBC, Full Fact and Reuters. Sky News Australia subsequently removed the broadcast and issued a correction on its website.

On 1 August 2021, YouTube barred Sky News Australia from uploading new content onto their channel for a week for breaking YouTube's rules on posting videos containing COVID-19 misinformation. Upon the channel's return to the platform, Sky News Australia published a piece titled "Uncancelled: Sky News Australia Set Free" wherein Digital Editor Jack Houghton claimed the channel's temporary banning was the result of Silicon Valley and left-wing media attempting to stifle free speech.

A 2022 analysis by the Institute for Strategic Dialogue, a British think tank, found that Sky News Australia was a major source for climate change misinformation. Sky News Australia rejected the findings of the analysis, saying that they would "continue to encourage debate" on climate change. In 2022, Sky News Australia promoted a now retracted journal article from the European Physical Journal that claimed to have found no evidence of climate change in two video segments. The two segments were viewed more than 500,000 times.

== Reception ==
=== Ratings ===
The highest rating broadcast on Sky News Australia was an episode of Paul Murray Live on 26 June 2013 (following the 2013 Labor leadership spill), averaging 197,000 viewers across a special two-hour broadcast. The highest audience share Sky News Australia has achieved was during coverage of the 2009 Victorian bushfires.

On 15 December 2014 during the Sydney Lindt café siege, coverage of the unfolding incident took 16 of the 20 most watched programs on the Foxtel platform. The 7 pm (AEST) hour was the highest rated at 109,000 viewers. Sky News achieved a day time share of 2.6% (behind ABC News 24's 3.8%) and a primetime share of 1.5% (behind ABC News 24's 2.5%).

Sky News Live rated 56,000 viewers for early evening coverage of the 2015 Queensland state election, and 83,000 viewers for later coverage, beaten by ABC News 24's coverage which was watched by 195,000 viewers nationally. For its coverage of the failed Liberal leadership spill on 9 February 2015 between 9 am and 10 am, Sky News Live was the second most watched subscription channel and the coverage was the third most watched program of the day with 69,000 viewers.

Sky News Live reached a total audience of 700,000 viewers on 14 September 2015 (including simulcast on Sky News Business) during the 2015 Liberal leadership spill. It was the most watched subscription television channel for the evening and outrated all free-to-air television channels between 11 pm and midnight AEST. The highest rated hour of coverage was from 10pm, achieving 190,000 viewers, the second highest ratings since the 2013 Labor Party spill.

A March 2016 article in the Guardian Australia reported Sky News averages 12,000 national viewers between 6 pm and midnight, with a peak of 18,000 between 8 pm and 10 pm, although the report did not specify what days or dates this average refers to.

During the 2016 federal election, Sky News averaged 96,000 viewers, an increase of 46% from the 2013 election.

In July 2018, Sky News claimed to have achieved its highest ratings on record, with viewership up 9% overall and its weeknight primetime (6pm–11pm) viewership 25% higher on the same period last year, according to OzTAM figures.

In August 2018, coverage of the Liberal Party of Australia leadership spill, 2018 saw Sky News gain its highest Tuesday primetime audience ever with a 4.2% audience share. Speers, Credlin and Jones & Co all had their highest-rated episodes on record.

The Sky News 2022 Australian federal election debate had 415,000 viewers.

The Sky News 2025 Australian federal election debate had a viewership of 410,000.

=== Criticism ===
In August 2018, Sky News was heavily criticised for providing a platform to Blair Cottrell, leader of the far-right, Neo-Nazi organisation United Patriots Front in a one-to-one discussion about immigration on The Adam Giles Show. Sky News presenter Laura Jayes and ABC journalist David Speers were among those critical (both on-air and off-air) of his appearance on the programme due to the fact that he has expressed admiration for Adolf Hitler and claimed to have manipulated women "using violence and terror." Sky News commentator and former Labor Party minister Craig Emerson resigned in protest after the interview was broadcast, stating that "My father fought Nazis in WWII and was interred in a German POW camp", and that the decision to give Cottrell a platform on Sky News was "another step in a journey to normalising racism & bigotry in our country". The activist group Sleeping Giants Oz called on advertisers to pull advertising campaigns off Sky News in the wake of the channel's interview with Cottrell.

Several high-profile figures have criticised Sky News, including former prime minister Kevin Rudd, who told a media inquiry in February 2021 that it was following the "template" of Fox News in becoming a "legitimising echo-chamber for this increasingly far-right, extremist worldview". In December 2023, former Victorian premier Daniel Andrews, who was a frequent target of scorn from Sky News pundits during his premiership, referred to the channel's prime time coverage as "bullshit" and "the worst of American politics imported into ours".

=== Accolades ===
List of accolades
Year	Award	Category	Recipient(s)	Result
2007	2007 ASTRA Awards	Most outstanding performance by a presenter	David Speers	Won
2007	2007 ASTRA Awards	Most Creative Use of Technology	Anytime, Anywhere	Nominated
2008	Logie Awards of 2008	Most Outstanding News Coverage	Federal Election	Nominated
2008	2008 ASTRA Awards	Most outstanding performance by a presenter	David Speers	Won
2008	2008 ASTRA Awards	Most outstanding performance by a broadcast journalist	Kieran Gilbert	Won
2008	2008 ASTRA Awards	Most outstanding performance by a broadcast journalist	Mike Willesee	Nominated
2008	2008 ASTRA Awards	Most outstanding performance by a presenter	Hellen Dalley	Nominated
2008	2008 ASTRA Awards	Channel of the year	Sky News Australia	Nominated
2008	2008 ASTRA Awards	Favourite male personality	James Bracey	Nominated
2008	2008 ASTRA Awards	Favourite male personality	David Speers	Nominated
2008	2008 ASTRA Awards	Favourite female personality	Helen Dalley	Nominated
2008	2008 ASTRA Awards	Favourite female personality	Brooke Corte	Nominated
2008	2008 ASTRA Awards	Most Outstanding News Program or Coverage	APEC 2007	Won
2009	2009 ASTRA Awards	Most Outstanding Performance by a Broadcast Journalist	David Speers	Won
2009	2009 ASTRA Awards	Favourite male personality	Kieran Gilbert	Nominated
2010	Logie Awards of 2010	Most Outstanding Public Affairs Report	Liberal Leadership Meltdown	Nominated
2010	2010 ASTRA Awards	Most Outstanding Performance by a Broadcast Journalist	Kieran Gilbert	Won
2011	Logie Awards of 2011	Most Outstanding News Coverage	Election 2010	Nominated
2011	2011 ASTRA Awards	Most Outstanding Performance by a Broadcast Journalist	Ashleigh Gillon	Won
2011	2011 ASTRA Awards	Most Outstanding Performance by a Presenter	David Speers	Won
2011	2011 ASTRA Awards	Most Outstanding News Program or Coverage	Election 2010	Won
2012	Logie Awards of 2012	Most Outstanding News Coverage	Qantas Grounded	Nominated
2012	2012 ASTRA Awards	Most Outstanding Performance by a Presenter	David Speers	Won
2013	Logie Awards of 2013	Most Outstanding News Coverage	Rudd Vs Gillard Leadership Challenge	Nominated
2013	2013 ASTRA Awards	Most Outstanding Performance by a Broadcast Journalist	Ahron Young	Won
2013	2013 ASTRA Awards	Favourite personality – male	Paul Murray	Nominated
2013	2013 ASTRA Awards	Favourite Programme Australian	Paul Murray Live	Nominated
2014	Logie Awards of 2014	Most Outstanding News Coverage	Leadership Spill	Nominated
2014	2014 ASTRA Awards	Channel of the year	Sky News National	Nominated
2014	2014 ASTRA Awards	Favourite personality – male	Paul Murray	Nominated
2014	2014 ASTRA Awards	Favourite personality – female	Laura Jayes	Nominated
2014	2014 ASTRA Awards	Favourite program: Australian	Paul Murray Live	Nominated
2014	2014 ASTRA Awards	Most Outstanding News Program	Election 2013 coverage	Won
2014	2014 ASTRA Awards	Most Outstanding News Program	Paul Murray Live	Nominated
2014	2014 ASTRA Awards	Most Outstanding performance by a broadcast journalist	Kieran Gilbert	Nominated
2014	2014 ASTRA Awards	Most Outstanding performance by a broadcast journalist	Ahron Young	Nominated
2014	2014 ASTRA Awards	Most Outstanding performance by a broadcast journalist	Daniel Bourchier	Nominated
2014	2014 ASTRA Awards	Most Outstanding performance by a broadcast journalist	David Speers	Won
2015	Logie Awards of 2015	Most Outstanding News Coverage	What Is Metadata?	Nominated
2015	2015 ASTRA Awards	Channel of the year	Sky News National	Won
2015	2015 ASTRA Awards	Most Outstanding Presenter – Male	Paul Murray	Won
2015	2015 ASTRA Awards	Most Outstanding Presenter – Female	Nina Stevens	Nominated
2015	2015 ASTRA Awards	Most Outstanding Performance by a Broadcast Journalist	David Speers	Won
2015	2015 ASTRA Awards	Most Outstanding Performance by a Broadcast Journalist	Kieran Gilbert	Nominated
2015	2015 ASTRA Awards	Most Outstanding Performance by a Broadcast Journalist	Celina Edmonds	Nominated
2015	2015 ASTRA Awards	Most Outstanding Performance by a Broadcast Journalist	Ahron Young	Nominated
2015	2015 ASTRA Awards	Most Outstanding News Program	Paul Murray Live	Won
2015	2015 ASTRA Awards	Most Outstanding News Program	PM Agenda	Nominated
2015	2015 ASTRA Awards	Most Outstanding News Program	Richo + Jones	Nominated
2016	Logie Awards of 2016	Most Outstanding News Coverage	Liberal Leadership Crisis: Abbott V Turnbull	Nominated
2016	ASTRA Industry Awards	Most Outstanding Innovation (use of technology)	LiveU SmartGRIP	Nominated
2016	Walkley Awards	Coverage of a Major News Event or Issue	2016 Election coverage	Won
2016	6th AACTA Awards	Subscription Television Award For Best Live Event Production	2016 Election Coverage	Nominated
2016	6th AACTA Awards	Subscription Television Award For Best Male Presenter	David Speers	Nominated
2017	Logie Awards of 2017	Most Outstanding News Coverage	2016 Election coverage	Won
2021	Kennedy Awards	Journalist of the Year	Sharri Markson	Nominated
2021	Kennedy Awards	Outstanding TV News Reporting	Kieran Gilbert and Andrew Clennell	Nominated
2021	Kennedy Awards	Outstanding Nightly Current Affairs	Sharri Markson	Won
2021	Kennedy Awards	Outstanding Long Form Current Affairs	Peta Credlin	Won
2023	NT Media Awards	NT Journalist of the Year	Matt Cunningham	Won
2023	NT Media Awards	Best News Coverage x 2	Matt Cunningham	Won
2023	NT Media Awards	Best Current Affairs or Feature	Matt Cunningham	Won
2023	NT Media Awards	Best Crime / Court Reporting	Matt Cunningham	Won
2023	Kennedy Awards	The Paul Lockyer Award for Regional Broadcast Reporting	Matt Cunningham	Won
2023	Queensland Clarion Awards	Broadcast Report	Jonathan Lea	Won

== Broadcast ==
News24 began broadcasting in widescreen, along with its sister channels on 17 May 2009. News24 only provides closed captioning between 4 pm and 5 pm (AEST/AEDT) each day.

News24 began broadcasting in high definition on 1 December 2015.

== Other services ==
=== News24 social media ===
The popularity of News24 YouTube channel has grown rapidly compared with other news outlets. At one point it ranked among the top 10 most-watched news channels in the world on YouTube, surpassing the BBC and Sky News in total video views. This growth has been driven by opinion-led segments that attract international audiences, especially in the United States.

On more than one occasion, News24 has had its social media accounts temporarily restricted or suspended for breaching platform rules on misinformation. For example, YouTube once suspended the network's account for a week over alleged COVID-19 misinformation.

=== Sky News Multiview ===
With the roll-out of Foxtel Digital, Sky News Australia launched the Sky News Active interactive news service based on the Sky News UK service with the same name. The service offered a choice of eight news screens, some with original content not seen on the main channel they vary depending on the days news or events and include the latest news, business, sport, showbiz and weather in text. Other features included interactive polling and the latest news headlines via text. On 15 November 2009 Sky News Active re-launched with a new look as well as 5 additional local screens (Sydney, Melbourne, Brisbane, Perth, and Adelaide.)

=== Sky News Now (mobile service) ===
Sky News Now was a mobile service available on Vodafone, Telstra and 3. It offered a wide variety of news in both video and text. As of 2015, the service was no longer available.

=== Sky News Alerts ===
Sky News Alerts is a SMS and MMS breaking news service available on all mobile phones inside Australia. Breaking news alerts are sent to a subscriber via SMS or MMS at a cost per message.

=== Qantas ===
In November 2014, News24 was contracted to provide Qantas with in-flight news bulletins replacing a longstanding contract with the Nine Network.

=== Radio and podcasting ===
In Australia, since June 2023, Sky News partners with Nova Entertainment to offer an audio simulcast of its television channel via the free Nova Player app (nationally) and DAB+ digital radio (Sydney, Melbourne and Brisbane only). Various programs podcasts including First Business, Market Day, Showbiz, Agenda, Australian News Week, Credlin and The Rita Panahi Show are also available on the app. Previously, it was on IHeartRadio from March 2020 until June 2023, as part of a deal with ARN.

=== News24 Regional ===
News24 Regional
- Country: Australia
- Broadcast area: Regional QLD, Northern NSW & Gold Coast, Southern NSW & ACT, Regional VIC

Programming
- Language: English
- Picture format: 576i SDTV

Ownership
- Owner: Australian News Channel (News Corp Australia)
- Sister channels: News24; News24 Weather; News24 World

History
- Launched: 2 September 2018; 8 years ago
- Replaced: Aspire TV (in SCA areas)
- Replaced by: 9Life (in most WIN areas)
- Former names: Sky News on WIN (2018–2021); Sky News Regional (2021–2026)

Links
- Website: www.news24.com.au

Availability

Terrestrial
- Network 10: Channel 56 (Regional Queensland, Regional Victoria, Southern NSW and ACT) (Northern NSW and Gold Coast)

Launch logo as Sky News on WIN

News24 Regional, formerly known as Sky News Regional is a free-to-air version of Sky News Australia, which was launched on 2 September 2018 as Sky News on WIN. The channel features Sky News Australia and Fox Sports News programming, as well as the morning newscast Sky News Breakfast commissioned for this channel that also airs on Sky News Weather. The channel was originally established as part of a partnership with WIN Television. In 2021, WIN's contracts with both Network 10 and Sky News expired; with WIN returning to its previous Nine Network affiliation on 1 July 2021, and Sky News's contract expiring on 1 August 2021 (the allotments were, in turn, used for 9Life). Sky News reached a new agreement with Southern Cross Austereo to distribute the channel on their now Network 10-affiliated stations, now known as Sky News Regional.

In its first two weeks on the air, the channel averaged 10,000 viewers in primetime and 4,000 viewers in daytime, with Richo the highest rated program at 24,000 viewers.

The channel is available on digital channel 56 across Southern Cross Austereo's regional markets in Regional QLD, Southern NSW & ACT, Regional VIC, and Northern NSW and the Gold Coast was previously on WIN digital channels 53 from August 2021 until July 2026. It is not available in Broken Hill/Spencer Gulf, Tasmania, Mildura, Darwin, Remote & Central Australia and Regional WA. WIN-owned stations in Mildura, Tasmania, and Regional Western Australia previously broadcast the channel until August 2021 when it switched to 9Life's feed. The channel was previously on WIN digital channels 83 and 85, prior to the rebrand as Sky News Regional on 1 August 2021.

Sky News Regional ended its broadcast on channel 53 in Griffith and South-East South Australia/Riverland on 30 June 2024 after an unsuccessful renewal of the affiliation agreement with WIN.

In July 2025, Sky News and Network 10 signed an agreement to continue airing Sky News Regional, following 10's acquisition of its affiliated stations in regional Queensland, Southern New South Wales, regional Victoria (formerly owned by Southern Cross Austereo) and Northern New South Wales (formerly owned by WIN Television).

=== Sky News Election Channel ===
In April 2016, Sky News Australia announced a temporary spin-off channel known as the Sky News Election Channel. The channel carried extended coverage of the Australian federal election, the United Kingdom referendum on remaining in the European Union, and United States presidential election, including coverage and programming from partners such as Sky News UK, ABC News (United States), CBS News, CNN, C-SPAN, and Fox News, as well as encore showings of Sky News Australia opinion programmes. The channel temporarily replaced A-PAC on Foxtel; A-PAC remained available on Sky News Multiview. It operated from 1 May 2016 to 23 January 2017.

On 28 June 2024, the Sky News Election Channel was revived, focusing upon coverage of the 2024 United Kingdom general election, French legislative election, and United States presidential elections, and the 2025 Australian federal election. The channel once again replaced Sky News Extra on Foxtel.

=== News24 Now ===
On 23 March 2023, the network launched a free ad-supported streaming television (FAST) channel on Samsung TV Plus and LG TV Live Channels known as Sky News Now; the channel features highlighted content from Sky News, Sky News Weather Channel, and Sky News Extra.

On 27 July 2026, Sky News Now rebranded as News24 Now.

== See also ==
- List of programs broadcast by News24
- Foxtel
- Media bias
- ADH TV
- Sky Television
