= Insiders (Australian TV program) =

Political news TV series in Australia

- Title card
- Genre: Politics, analysis
- Presented by: Barrie Cassidy (2001—2019); David Speers (2020—present)
- Theme music composer: Herbie Hancock
- Opening theme: Call It 95
- Ending theme: Call It 95
- Country of origin: Australia
- Original language: English
- No. of seasons: 25
- No. of episodes: 45 (2025)

Production
- Executive producer: Samuel Clark (until November 2025)
- Producer: Robyn Powell
- Production locations: Canberra, Australian Capital Territory
- Running time: 60 minutes

Original release
- Network: ABC TV; ABC News (2010–present)
- Release: 15 July 2001 – present

Related
- Offsiders

Insiders is an Australian panel format news and political discussion television program produced by ABC News, and currently hosted by David Speers, airing at 9 am Sunday mornings on ABC TV, ABC News and on demand via ABC iview.

== Format ==
As a Sunday morning talk show, the format of the program usually starts with the show's host discussing political issues of the week and the weekend newspapers, followed by a long form interview of around 15 to 20 minutes with a current Australian political figure, usually an Australian politician. Following the interview in the first half hour, current political issues are discussed with a changing panel of three commentators/journalists of varying political perspectives. Similar in format to Sunday morning talk shows in the United States, Insiders analyses and discusses Australian politics with the use of a panel of political journalists and columnists and interviews with prominent politicians and commentators with a number of regular weekly segments, such as 'Talking Pictures'. The show ends with the panel members asked for their "final observation and predictions".

The program features a wide array of regular commentators from various Australian media outlets and think tanks. The show is part of the ABC's Sunday morning line-up, commencing with Insiders, followed by a similar format half hour panel show Offsiders since 2006, a sports program developed and initially hosted by Barrie Cassidy.

== Background ==
=== First host: Barrie Cassidy (2001—2019) ===
The program first aired on 15 July 2001 on ABC TV, and was hosted by Barrie Cassidy for 18 years until his retirement in June 2019. The first guest interview was with Prime Minister John Howard.

"Insiders entered a very crowded Sunday morning political market in 2001. But our approach was to provide coverage with so many more elements, and to do it in a way that is informative but irreverent. And of course have a few laughs along the way. If you took politics too seriously you'd go mad," — founding host, Barrie Cassidy.

Fran Kelly hosted Insiders when Barrie Cassidy tooklong service leave, and Chris Uhlmann, prior to his move to the Nine Network, also hosted the show in Cassidy's absence.

The 2007 series included small changes to the format of the show: re-ordering the segments, commencing the program with the political interview, followed by 'Your Shout'. Paul Kelly's discussion (this segment was discontinued in 2010) was then used as a starting point for the panel discussion. 'Talking Pictures' continued to provide a break point within the panel discussions.

In 2011, the usual program format began with a brief monologue from Cassidy followed by a brief video summary of the major events of the preceding week. Cassidy then reviewed the Sunday papers with the studio panel before moving on to the studio guest. If the guest is present in the studio the interview is introduced by a short video clip relating to the first interview question. The interview usually lasts until midway through the hour and is followed by a video clip which concentrates on events surrounding a major news topic of the week. This was followed by a panel discussion between Cassidy and his studio guests. Cassidy introduced 'Talking Pictures' towards the end of the hour, which is followed by further panel discussion in the studio. The show usually wound up with Cassidy introducing amusing or otherwise interesting media clips followed by an observation or prediction from each panel member before Cassidy ended the show with a final media clip or two.

In March 2019, Cassidy announced he would be leaving Insiders after the 2019 Australian election and after eighteen years in the hosting chair. His last show was on 9 June 2019; regular fill-in presenters Fran Kelly and Annabel Crabb alternated hosting duties until the end of the year.

On 11 July 2021, Barrie Cassidy returned to the show as a guest on 'Talking Pictures' to celebrate the show's 20th anniversary.

=== Second host: David Speers (2020—) ===
In June 2019 David Speers was announced as Cassidy's replacement from 2020.

Since David Speers became host in 2020 the format has remained relatively consistent, with an opening edited video compilation that frames the weeks key events, opening remarks and discussion with the three panellists, a look at the Sunday newspaper stories followed by a political interview of around 15 to 20 minutes in duration. The discussion returns to the panellists for around 20 minutes then breaking to a prerecorded 'Talking Pictures' package (hosted by Mike Bowers with a weekly guest), then returns to the studio for closing comments and observations.

In June 2020, the program received criticism for having an all-white panel discussing the Black Lives Matter movement. An investigation by Junkee discovered that there seemingly had never been a person of colour on the panel in the show's history. Consequently, ABC journalist Bridget Brennan accepted an invitation to be on the following week's program, seemingly becoming the first non-white person to ever appear on the Insiders panel. Addressing the criticism, Speers admitted the previous week's edition of Insiders lacked an important perspective and that the program needed to do better in having more diverse insights into political debate.

In May 2023, it was announced that the show would relocate from the ABC's Melbourne studio to Canberra later in 2023. The first episode broadcast from Canberra was on 9 July 2023.

== Regular segments ==
=== Making News ===
Originally titled 'Sunday Papers' the show opened with a review of headlines and front pages of Sunday newspapers from around Australia. The segment now covers the latest stories, still mostly in newspapers, but sometimes from other sources or online outlets, at the beginning of the show.

=== Talking Pictures ===
Presented by Mike Bowers, the Talking Pictures segment analyses political cartoons and photographs featured in the nation's newspapers, magazines and news websites from the previous week in around a four minute timeslot. Regularly appearing cartoonists and photographers have included Warren Brown, Bryan Dawe,Bill Leak, Geoff Pryor, Bruce Petty, Alan Moir, Peter Nicholson, Mark Knight, Jon Kudelka, Peter Hoysted, Matt Golding, Andrew Meares, David Pope, Amanda Copp, Paul Batey, Cathy Wilcox, Sean Leahy, Fiona Katauskas and Alex Ellinghausen. The segment is produced by Fiona Katauskas.

=== The Curve ===
Presented by Casey Briggs, The Curve started in 2020 during the COVID-19 pandemic providing weekly analysis and information graphics of infection and hospitalisation rates. The segment has evolved into other subject areas including electoral polling analysis and the 2023 Australian Indigenous Voice referendum called The Crunch. Federal election polling analysis segments are titled as Australia Votes.

=== Matt Price Moment ===
The 'Matt Price Moment' is an annual award and is included in the final Insiders episode of each year with an edited shortlist, and a selected winner decided by the show's producers. It showcases humorous, oddball, quirky and lighthearted political moments from the previous 12 months, often highlighting politician gaffes or amusing event, speech or media interaction. The segment honours journalist and sketch writer Matt Price, a regular Insiders panellist who died in 2007.

==== Matt Price Moment Winners ====
- 2008
- 2009
- 2010 Bob Brown — Masterchef cooking tips
- 2011 Kevin Rudd — Appears on stage
- 2012 Bill Shorten — "My view is what the Prime Minister's view is." — interview with David Speers
- 2013 Tony Abbott — "Suppository of all wisdom."
- 2014 Tony Abbott — "Shirt front Mr Putin, you bet you are."
- 2015 Christopher Pyne — "I'm a fixer." — interview with David Speers.
- 2016 Richard Marles and Christopher Pyne — Pyne & Marles TV show intro
- 2017 Bob Katter — "People are entitled to their sexual proclivities, let there be a thousand blossoms bloom, as far as I am concerned, but I ain’t spending any time on it because in the meantime, every three months, a person is torn to pieces by a crocodile in North Queensland!"
- 2018 Pauline Hanson — Flip flop answer
- 2019 Simon Birmingham — Closed doors
- 2020 Daniel Andrews — "Platonic and intimate partners."
- 2021 David Honey (West Australian Liberal leader) — "Fight like a chi-chi-uana."
- 2023 Jane Hume — Mangled Winston Churchill quote
- 2024 Elizabeth Lee (ACT Liberal leader) — Flips middle finger
- 2025 Anthony Albanese goes into reverse gear "You have to deal with things as you get..."

== Former segments ==
=== Your Shout ===
The Your Shout segment (dropped in 2010) gave a member or group of members of the public a chance to air a grievance or present opinions about topical political issues that concerned them, in a short, pre-recorded segment shown during the program. It appears that the program attempted to ensure that the members of the public selected from week to week represented a broad range of political opinion and were spread across different parts in Australia.

=== Poll of Polls ===
Presented by Andrew Catsaras, the Poll of Polls segment aggregated and reviewed political polling from the previous month. This segment commenced in February 2012, appearing during the last week of each month in 2012, moving to the first week of each month in 2013.

=== Video mashups ===
Up until May 2022 the program's editor, Huw Parkinson, produced dozens of video mashups compositing the faces of political figures onto well known films and other pop culture footage. Parkinson's videos won him a Walkley Award for multimedia storytelling in 2015.

== Theme music ==
The Insiders opening and closing theme music uses a track titled 'Call It 95' by American jazz musician Herbie Hancock, from the 1994 album Dis Is da Drum. The track includes the line "you're making us all feel very excited about being here".

== Commentators and panellists ==
=== Regular panellists ===
Insiders panellists since 2023
Commentator	Background	Latest appearance
Gary Adshead	Journalist, Drive presenter ABC Radio Perth	20 July 2025
Waleed Aly	Journalist	4 October 2026
Clare Armstrong	Chief digital political correspondent, ABC News	8 November 2026
Bridget Brennan	Co-host, News Breakfast	27 April 2025
Greg Brown	Chief political reporter, The Australian	25 October 2026
Dan Bourchier	Journalist	17 March 2024
James Campbell	Political editor, The Sunday Telegraph, Sunday Herald Sun	6 September 2026
Melissa Clarke	National affairs editor, ABC News	27 September 2026
Miriam Corowa	Presenter, ABC News	6 July 2025
Annabel Crabb	Political journalist, ABC	19 July 2026
Natassia Chrysanthos	Federal political correspondent, The Sydney Morning Herald	31 May 2026
Charles Croucher	Chief political editor, Nine News	20 September 2026
David Crowe	Chief political editor for The Age and The Sydney Morning Herald	28 September 2025
Tom Crowley	Political reporter, ABC News	1 November 2026
Phil Coorey	Political editor, Australian Financial Review	1 November 2026
Katina Curtis	Canberra bureau chief, The West Australian	11 October 2026
Rafael Epstein	Presenter, ABC Radio Melbourne	11 October 2026
Osman Faruqi	Culture editor, The Age and The Sydney Morning Herald	19 April 2026
Anthony Galloway	Chief political correspondent, Capital Brief	27 October 2024
Andrew Greene	Defence correspondent, ABC News	30 April 2023
Jacob Greber	Political editor, ABC News	13 September 2026
Peter Hartcher	Political editor and international editor for The Age and The Sydney Morning Herald	11 October 2026
Anna Henderson	Chief political correspondent, SBS World News	18 October 2026
Jennifer Hewett	National affairs columnist, Australian Financial Review	14 June 2026
Isabella Higgins	Senior journalist, ABC News	14 September 2025
Sarah Ison	Federal political reporter, The Australian	10 August 2025
John Paul Janke	Journalist, NITV	16 March 2025
Daniel James	Journalist, 7am podcast	5 July 2026
Greg Jennett	Political correspondent, ABC	29 October 2023
Patricia Karvelas	Presenter, ABC News	31 May 2026
John Kehoe	Economics editor, Australian Financial Review	4 October 2026
Fran Kelly	Presenter, ABC Radio National	10 September 2023
Sean Kelly	Journalist, The Sydney Morning Herald	26 May 2024
Mark Kenny	Senior fellow at the Australian Studies Institute, Australian National University	25 October 2026
Matthew Knott	Foreign affairs and national security correspondent, The Sydney Morning Herald and The Age	27 September 2026
Alan Kohler	Finance presenter and columnist, ABC News	17 May 2026
Jason Koutsoukis	Special correspondent, The Saturday Paper	15 March 2026
Jack Latimore	Indigenous affairs journalist, The Age	16 April 2023
Rosie Lewis	Political correspondent, The Australian	12 March 2023
Claudia Long	Journalist, ABC News	30 November 2025
Jade Macmillan	North America bureau chief, ABC News	3 November 2024
Samantha Maiden	Political editor, news.com.au	8 November 2026
Sarah Martin	Senior correspondent, The Guardian	13 September 2026
James Massola	National affairs editor, The Age and The Sydney Morning Herald	20 September 2026
Jacqueline Maley	Columnist, The Sydney Morning Herald	1 November 2026
Tom McIlroy	Chief political correspondent, Guardian Australia	5 October 2025
Shalailah Medhora	Political reporter, Triple J Hack program	27 July 2025
Karen Middleton	Political journalist Inside Story, former political editor, Guardian Australia	6 September 2026
Dana Morse	Political reporter ABC News	24 September 2023
Jane Norman	National affairs correspondent, ABC News	16 August 2026
Andrew Probyn	National affairs editor, Nine Network and former political editor, ABC News	8 November 2026
Ashleigh Raper	Political editor, Network 10	30 August 2026
Amy Remeikis	Political reporter, formerly with Guardian Australia	7 July 2024
Paul Sakkal	Federal political correspondent, The Age and The Sydney Morning Herald	18 October 2026
Niki Savva	Author, political columnist The Age and The Sydney Morning Herald and former Liberal staffer	25 October 2026
Greg Sheridan	Journalist, foreign editor, The Australian	27 September 2026
Cameron Stewart	Chief international correspondent, The Australian	14 June 2026
Michael Stutchbury	Editor–at–large, Australian Financial Review	13 April 2025
Lenore Taylor	Editor–in–chief, Guardian Australia	18 October 2026
Laura Tingle	Global affairs editor, ABC News	20 September 2026
Farrah Tomazin	North America correspondent for The Age and The Sydney Morning Herald	3 November 2024
Peter van Onselen	Contributing editor, The Australian newspaper, professor at Griffith University and adjunct professor at the University of Western Australia	8 October 2023
Carly Williams	Journalist, ABC News	13 October 2024
Shane Wright	Senior economics correspondent for The Age and The Sydney Morning Herald	24 May 2026

Panellists who have appeared since January 2023

=== Former panellists ===
Commentator	Background	Last appeared
Piers Akerman	Columnist, Sydney's The Daily Telegraph and Sunday Telegraph	22 September 2013
Lorena Allam	Former indigenous affairs editor, Guardian Australia	31 July 2022
Dennis Atkins	Former national affairs editor, The Courier-Mail	1 November 2020
Simon Benson	Political and national affairs editor, The Australian	29 November 2020
Andrew Bolt	Host of The Bolt Report on Sky News Live, Herald Sun columnist and blogger	10 April 2011
Tim Blair	Opinion editor, Sydney's The Daily Telegraph	27 September 2009
Gabrielle Chan	Guardian Australia	15 November 2020
James Chessel	Former executive editor of The Sydney Morning Herald and The Age	26 April 2020
Malcolm Farr	Guardian Australia	12 July 2020
Jan Fran	Journalist and presenter	25 October 2020
Stan Grant	Journalist	20 November 2022
Gerard Henderson	Executive director, The Sydney Institute	13 October 2019
Narelda Jacobs	Presenter, Network 10	3 July 2022
Paul Kelly	Editor–at–large, The Australian	11 September 2022
David Marr	Journalist, Guardian Australia	17 November 2019
George Megalogenis	Author/columnist, The Age and The Sydney Morning Herald	13 May 2018
Glenn Milne	Political journalist, The Australian and News Corp Sunday publications (sacked as a panelist)	24 October 2010
Katharine Murphy	Former political editor, Guardian Australia (moved to Prime Minister's Office, January 2024)	8 October 2023
Gareth Parker	Journalist and former presenter, 6PR	29 November 2020
Matt Price	Sketch writer, The Australian	12 November 2006
Mark Riley	Political editor, Seven News	24 May 2020
Mike Seccombe	National correspondent, The Saturday Paper	12 August 2018
Lanai Scarr	Former journalist, The West Australian	13 March 2022
Tory Shepherd	Journalist, Guardian Australia and former News Corp correspondent	13 September 2015
Annika Smethurst	State political editor, The Age	20 November 2022
Brian Toohey	Former columnist with Australian Financial Review	6 September 2015
Virginia Trioli	Journalist and presenter, ABC News and Radio	26 April 2020
Renee Viellaris	Former federal political editor, The Courier-Mail (moved to Australian Federal Police June 2020)	12 April 2020
Kerry-Anne Walsh	Political author	24 November 2013
Alice Workman	Former political reporter, Buzzfeed	5 August 2018

== Episode listing ==
=== 2024 season episode listing ===
Season 23 episodes
Ep	Date	Panel	Guest interview	Talking Pictures guest	Key issues	Location	Host
1	4 February 2024	Phil Coorey; Samantha Maiden; Karen Middleton	Anthony Albanese; Prime Minister	Cathy Wilcox	Stage three tax cuts	Canberra	David Speers
2	11 February 2024	Clare Armstrong; Tom Crowley; Jacob Greber	Angus Taylor; Shadow Treasurer	Alex Ellinghausen	Stage three tax cuts	Canberra	David Speers
3	18 February 2024	David Crowe; Ashleigh Raper; John Paul Janke	Max Chandler-Mather; Greens housing spokesperson	Amanda Copp	Boat arrivals in WA	Canberra	David Speers
4	25 February 2024	Raf Epstein; Sarah Ison; Katina Curtis	Jason Clare; Education Minister	Dan Ilic	Boat arrivals in WA	Canberra	David Speers
5	3 March 2024	Patricia Karvelas; Niki Savva; Paul Sakkal	Dan Tehan, Shadow Immigration Minister	Fiona Katauskas	2024 Dunkley by-election, Victoria	Canberra	David Speers
6	10 March 2024	Peter Hartcher; Anna Henderson; Jennifer Hewett	Chris Bowen; Minister for Climate Change and Energy	Andrew Meares	Vehicle emission standard	Canberra	David Speers
7	17 March 2024	Dan Bourchier; Phil Coorey; Samantha Maiden	James Paterson; Shadow Minister for Home Affairs	Zoe Norton Lodge	Tik Tok; Immigration Detention	Canberra	David Speers
8	24 March 2024	Clare Armstrong; Anthony Galloway; Shalailah Medhora	Richard Marles; Deputy Prime Minister of Australia	Peter Hoysted (Jack the Insider)	2024 Tasmanian state election Trump v Rudd	Canberra	David Speers
9	7 April 2024	Katina Curtis; Karen Middleton; Paul Sakkal	Simon Birmingham; Shadow Foreign Minister	Megan Herbert	World Central Kitchen drone strikes	Canberra	David Speers
10	14 April 2024	Anna Henderson; John Kehoe; David Crowe	Jim Chalmers; Treasurer	Mark Humphries	2024 Bondi Junction stabbings 2024 Australian federal budget	Canberra	David Speers
11	21 April 2024	Phil Coorey; Samantha Maiden; Lenore Taylor	Peter Dutton; Opposition Leader	Cathy Wilcox	Elon Musk; 2024 Wakeley church stabbing	Canberra	David Speers
12	28 April 2024	Karen Middleton; Shane Wright; Bridget Brennan	Dai Le; Independent MP for Fowler	Lewis Hobba	Elon Musk; 2024 Wakeley church stabbing Domestic violence	Canberra	David Speers
13	5 May 2024	Clare Armstrong; Tom Crowley; Jennifer Hewett	Katy Gallagher; Finance Minister	Fiona Katauskas	Marches against domestic violence 2024 Australian federal budget	Canberra	David Speers
14	12 May 2024	Annabel Crabb; Jacob Greber; Niki Savva	Angus Taylor; Shadow Treasurer	Alex Lee	2024 Australian federal budget	Canberra	David Speers
15	19 May 2024	Phil Coorey; Peter Hartcher; Laura Tingle	Jim Chalmers; Treasurer	Alex Ellinghausen	2024 Australian federal budget	Canberra	David Speers
16	26 May 2024	Katina Curtis; Sean Kelly; Samantha Maiden	Adam Bandt; Leader of the Australian Greens	Glen Le Lievre	2024 Australian federal budget, Nuclear power in Australia	Canberra	David Speers
17	2 June 2024	James Campbell; Karen Middleton; James Massola	Murray Watt; Agriculture Minister	Zoe Norton Lodge	Immigration, inflation	Canberra	David Speers
18	9 June 2024	Clare Armstrong; John Kehoe; Claudia Long	David Coleman; Shadow Communications Minister	Dan Ilic	Climate emissions targets	Canberra	David Speers
19	16 June 2024	Jennifer Hewett; Anna Henderson; Paul Sakkal	Penny Wong; Foreign Minister	Jon Kudelka	Climate emissions targets, Chinese Premier visit to Australia, Australia–China relations	Canberra	David Speers
20	23 June 2024	David Crowe; Melissa Clarke; Ashleigh Raper	Ted O'Brien; Shadow Climate Change and Energy Minister	Cathy Wilcox	Coalition nuclear energy policy	Canberra	David Speers
21	30 June 2024	Mark Kenny; Samantha Maiden; Tom Crowley	Richard Marles; Deputy Prime Minister and Minister for Defence; Fatima Payman; Labor Senator	Amanda Copp	Julian Assange release, Fatima Payman crossing Senate floor	Canberra	David Speers
22	7 July 2024	Katina Curtis; Phil Coorey; Amy Remeikis	Mehreen Faruqi; Deputy Leader of the Australian Greens	Fiona Katauskas	Fatima Payman resignation from ALP	Canberra	David Speers
23	14 July 2024	Clare Armstrong; John Paul Janke; Anthony Galloway	Tony Burke; Minister for Employment and Workplace Relations	Not screened	Attempted assassination of Donald Trump, CFMEU and John Setka	Canberra	Patricia Karvelas
24	21 July 2024	Karen Middleton; Rafael Epstein; Shane Wright	Zoe Daniel; Independent MP for Goldstein	Peter Hoysted (Jack the Insider)	Presidential Nomination of Donald Trump at the 2024 Republican National Convention, CFMEU	Canberra	David Speers
25	28 July 2024	Jacob Greber; Niki Savva; Samantha Maiden	Brendon O'Connor; Outgoing Minister for Skills and Training	Glen Le Lievre	Minister retirements and cabinet reshuffle, Kamala Harris presidential nomination	Canberra	David Speers
26	4 August 2024	Carly Williams; Patricia Karvelas; John Paul Janke	Anthony Albanese; Prime Minister	Music performance by Yirrmal	Indigenous affairs post Voice referendum	Garma Festival	David Speers
27	11 August 2024	Melissa Clarke; David Crowe; John Kehoe	Mike Burgess; ASIO Director-General	Benjamin Law	Inflation, cost of living, terrorism and security	Canberra	David Speers
28	18 August 2024	Charles Croucher; Jennifer Hewett; Anna Henderson	David Littleproud; Nationals Leader	Amanda Copp	Gaza War, immigration, CFMEU, gambling	Canberra	David Speers
29	25 August 2024	Phil Coorey; Claudia Long; Karen Middleton	Bill Shorten; Minister for Government Services, Minister for the National Disability Insurance Scheme	Cathy Wilcox	National Disability Insurance Scheme reforms, 2024 Northern Territory general election, CFMEU	Canberra	David Speers
30	1 September 2024	Laura Tingle; Mark Kenny; Paul Sakkal	Andrew Bragg; Shadow Assistant Minister for Home Ownership	Lewis Hobba	2026 Census, foreign student caps	Canberra	David Speers
31	8 September 2024	Annabel Crabb; James Massola; Katina Curtis	Jim Chalmers; Treasurer	Mark Knight	Economy, interest rates, inflation	Canberra	David Speers
32	15 September 2024	Waleed Aly; Clare Armstrong; Jacob Greber	Jane Hume; Shadow Finance Minister	Alex Ellinghausen	Aged care	Canberra	David Speers
33	22 September 2024	Samantha Maiden; David Crowe; Shalailah Medhora	Mark Butler; Health Minister	Dan Ilic		Canberra	David Speers
34	29 September 2024	Karen Middleton; Greg Sheridan; John Kehoe	Bridget McKenzie; Shadow Transport Minister	Megan Herbert		Canberra	David Speers
35	6 October 2024	Niki Savva; Katina Curtis; Phil Coorey	Richard Marles; Deputy Pime Minister and Defence Minister	Glen Le Livre		Canberra	David Speers
36	13 October 2024	Mark Kenny; James Massola; Carly Williams	James Paterson; Shadow Home Affairs Minister	Peter Hoysted (Jack the Insider)		Canberra	David Speers
37	20 October 2024	Raf Epstein; Sarah Ison; Paul Sakkal	Murray Watt; Employment & Workplace Relations Minister	Alex Lee		Canberra	David Speers
38	27 October 2024	Clare Armstrong; Anthony Galloway; Patricia Karvelas	Cameron Dick; Queensland Treasurer	Charles Firth	2024 Queensland state election	Brisbane	David Speers
39	3 November 2024	Farrah Tomazin; Jade Macmillan	Joe Hockey; Former US Ambassador	Cathy Wilcox	2024 United States presidential election	Detroit, Michigan, USA	David Speers
40	10 November 2024	Sarah Ferguson; Charles Croucher	Charles Edel; Senior Adviser and Australia Chair, Center for Strategic and International Studies	Nick Bryant	2024 United States presidential election	Washington DC, USA	David Speers
41	17 November 2024	Annabel Crabb; Katina Curtis; Peter Hartcher	Anthony Albanese; Prime Minister (interviewed by David Speers in Lima, Peru)	Sammy J	APEC Peru 2024; 2024 G20 Rio de Janeiro summit	Canberra and Lima, Peru	Patricia Karvelas
42	24 November 2024	Clare Armstrong; Paul Sakkal; Phil Coorey	Sarah Hanson-Young; Greens Senator for South Australia	Peter Hoysted (Jack the Insider)		Canberra	David Speers
43	1 December 2024	Samantha Maiden; David Crowe; Karen Middleton	Anthony Albanese; Prime Minister	Megan Herbert	Final sitting week in Canberra, social media ban for under 16s, Matt Price Moment	Canberra	David Speers

=== 2025 season episode listing ===
Season 24 episodes
Ep	Date	Panel	Guest interview	Talking Pictures guest	Key issues	Location	Host
1	2 February 2025	Phil Coorey; Clare Armstrong; Laura Tingle	Peter Dutton; Opposition Leader	Glen Le Lievre	Inflation, interest rates	Canberra	David Speers
2	9 February 2025	Paul Sakkal; Samantha Maiden; Niki Savva	Katy Gallagher; Finance Minister	Cathy Wilcox	Gaza, Trump	Canberra	David Speers
3	16 February 2025	Anna Henderson; Tom Crowley; Jason Koutsoukis	Allegra Spender; Independent MP	Jack the Insider	US tariffs	Canberra	David Speers
4	23 February 2025	Shane Wright; Jennifer Hewitt; Jacob Greber	Jim Chalmers; Treasurer	Zoe Norton Lodge		Canberra	David Speers
5	2 March 2025	Clare Armstrong; Michael Stutchbury; Shalailah Medhora	James Paterson; Shadow Home Affairs Minister	Alex Ellinghausen		Canberra	David Speers
6	9 March 2025	Katina Curtis; Jane Norman; Gary Adshead	Murray Watt; Minister for Employment and Workplace Relations	Jan Fran	2025 Western Australian state election	Perth	David Speers
7	16 March 2025	Patricia Karvelas; John Kehoe; John Paul Janke	Adam Bandt; Leader of the Greens	Mark Humphries	Trade wars, Trump tariffs	Canberra	David Speers
8	23 March 2025	Mark Kenny; Melissa Clarke; Paul Sakkal	Angus Taylor; Shadow Treasurer	Glen Le Lievre		Canberra	David Speers
9	30 March 2025 (90 minute episode)	Laura Tingle; Phil Coorey; Samantha Maiden	Anthony Albanese; Prime Minister of Australia; James Paterson; Shadow Home Affairs Minister and campaign spokesperson	Professor Andrew Meares	2025 Australian federal election	Canberra	David Speers
10	6 April 2025 (90 minute episode)	Niki Savva; Jennifer Hewett; Tom Crowley	David Littleproud; Leader of the National Party; Penny Wong; Minister for Foreign Affairs	Fiona Katauskas	2025 Australian federal election, US tariffs, Port Darwin	Canberra	David Speers
11	13 April 2025 (90 minute episode)	Patricia Karvelas; Michael Stutchbury; James Massola	Clare O'Neil; Minister for Housing; Monique Ryan; Independent member for Kooyong	Zoe Norton Lodge	2025 Australian federal election, housing policy	Canberra	David Speers
12	20 April 2025 (90 minute episode)	Karen Middleton; Clare Armstrong; Raf Epstein	Michael Sukkar; Shadow Minister for Housing; Adam Bandt; Leader of the Australian Greens	Mark Humphries	2025 Australian federal election	Canberra	David Speers
13	27 April 2025 (90 minute episode)	Bridget Brennan; Anna Henderson; Jason Koutsoukis	Mark Butler; Minister for Health; Bridget McKenzie; Shadow Minister for Transport and Infrastructure	Cathy Wilcox	2025 Australian federal election	Hanging Rock, Victoria, Division of McEwen	David Speers
14	4 May 2025 (90 minute episode)	David Crowe; Samantha Maiden; Jacob Greber	Jim Chalmers; Treasurer; Zali Steggall; Independent MP for Warringah; Keith Wolahan Outgoing MP for Menzies	Government Coach (Sammy J)	2025 Australian federal election	Canberra	David Speers
15	11 May 2025	Phil Coorey; Melissa Clarke; Peter Hartcher	Ed Husic; MP for Chifley and outgoing Minister for Industry and Science	Jack the Insider	2025 Australian federal election Cabinet reshuffle, leadership challenges	Canberra	David Speers
16	18 May 2025	Niki Savva; Paul Sakkal; Anna Henderson	Anne Ruston; Liberal Senator	Mark Humphries	2025 Australian federal election, leadership changes	Canberra	David Speers
17	25 May 2025	Claudia Long; Jennifer Hewett; Mark Kenny	Kevin Hogan; Deputy Leader of the Nationals	Zoe Norton Lodge	2025 Australian federal election, Liberal–National Coalition split	Canberra	David Speers
18	1 June 2025	Jason Koutsoukis; Laura Tingle; Clare Armstrong	Chris Bowen; Minister for Climate Change and Energy	Anthony Lehmann	Liberal–National Coalition split and shadow cabinet, energy policy	Canberra	David Speers
19	8 June 2025	Karen Middleton; James Massola; Jane Norman	James Paterson; Shadow Home Affairs Minister	Eleri Harris	Gaza war	Canberra	David Speers
20	15 June 2025	Greg Sheridan; Waleed Aly; Katina Curtis	Penny Wong; Minister for Foreign Affairs	Cathy Wilcox	June 2025 Israeli strikes on Iran, 51st G7 summit, AUKUS	Canberra	David Speers
21	22 June 2025	Samantha Maiden; Phil Coorey; Rafael Epstein	Andrew Hastie; Shadow Minister for Home Affairs	Jack the Insider	June 2025 Israeli strikes on Iran, defence	Canberra	David Speers
22	29 June 2025	Mark Kenny; Isabella Higgins; Charles Croucher	Tanya Plibersek; Minister for Social Services	Glen Le Lievre	2025 United States strikes on Iranian nuclear sites, defence, Liberal Party quotas for women	Canberra	David Speers
23	6 July 2025	Miriam Corowa; Tom Crowley; Karen Middleton	Melissa McIntosh; Shadow Minister for Women and Communications	Amanda Copp	Childcare safety, defence, tariffs, Quad Meeting	Canberra	Patricia Karvelas
24	13 July 2025	Jacob Greber; Jennifer Hewett; Mark Kenny	Pat Conroy; Defence Industry Minister	Billi FitzSimons	PM's trip to China, US review of AUKUS, PBS and Trump tariffs, Antisemitism review	Canberra	Patricia Karvelas
25	20 July 2025	Gary Adshead; Peter Hartcher; Katina Curtis	Jonathon Duniam; Shadow Education Minister	Melina Wicks	PM's trip to China and meeting with CCP general secretary Xi Jinping, trade, 2025 Tasmanian state election	Canberra	David Speers
26	27 July 2025	Samantha Maiden; Paul Sakkal; Shalailah Medhora	Anthony Albanese; Prime Minister	Brendan Esposito	Student debt, childcare reform, Opening of 48th Parliament of Australia, Nationals and net zero, Gaza, AUKUS, US beef imports	Canberra	David Speers
27	3 August 2025	John Kehoe; Patricia Karvelas; Karen Middleton	Sally McManus; Secretary of the ACTU	Tina Quinn	Recognition of Palestine state, tax reform, productivity	Canberra	David Speers
28	10 August 2025	Anna Henderson; Melissa Clarke; Sarah Ison	Richard Marles; Deputy Prime Minister, Minister for Defence	Jack the Insider	Recognition of Palestine state, 2025 Russia–United States Summit	Canberra	David Speers
29	17 August 2025	Jacob Greber; Clare Armstrong; James Massola	Tim Wilson; Shadow Minister for Industrial Relations, Employment and Small Business	Zoe Norton Lodge	Productivity and Economic Reform Roundtable, 2025 Russia–United States Summit, Ukraine War	Canberra	David Speers
30	24 August 2025	Phillip Coorey; Jane Norman; Shane Wright	Jim Chalmers; Treasurer	Fiona Katauskas	Productivity and Economic Reform Roundtable, National Disability Insurance Scheme changes	Canberra	David Speers
31	31 August 2025	Laura Tingle; Paul Sakkal; Samantha Maiden	Julian Leeser; Shadow Attorney General	Eleri Harris	Recognition of Palestine	Canberra	David Speers
32	7 September 2025	Karen Middleton; Rafael Epstein; Ashleigh Raper	Sussan Ley; Leader of the Opposition	Mick Tsikas	2025 China Victory Day Parade, AUKUS	Canberra	David Speers
33	14 September 2025	Mark Kenny; Isabella Higgins; Greg Sheridan	Richard Marles; Minister for Defence	Cathy Wilcox	Defence, climate change, Net Zero targets, Jacinta Price immigration comments, Pacific Islands Forum	Canberra	David Speers
34	21 September 2025	Katina Curtis; Peter Hartcher; Jennifer Hewett	Chris Bowen; Minister for Energy and Climate Change; David Speers in New York	Benjamin Law	Climate change, Net Zero targets, Eightieth session of the United Nations General Assembly	Canberra	Melissa Clarke
35	28 September 2025	David Crowe; Anna Henderson; Phil Coorey	Anthony Albanese; Prime Minister	Nick Bryant	Palestinian statehood, AUKUS, PM in UK, Eightieth session of the United Nations General Assembly	London	David Speers
36	5 October 2025	Jacob Greber; Samantha Maiden; Tom McIlroy	Larissa Waters; Leader of the Australian Greens	Zoe Norton Lodge	Defence treaty with PNG, Optus Triple Zero failure, hospital funding, net zero	Canberra	David Speers
37	12 October 2025	Waleed Aly; Melissa Clarke; Paul Sakkal	Melissa McIntosh; Shadow Communications Minister	Jack the Insider	Gaza ceasefire, Optus Triple Zero failure, Andrew Hastie	Canberra	David Speers
38	19 October 2025	Laura Tingle; Peter Hartcher; Karen Middleton	Tony Burke; Minister for Home Affairs	Fiona Katauskas	Gaza ceasefire, superannuation, Barnaby Joyce, rare earth minerals supply	Canberra	David Speers
39	26 October 2025	Tom Crowley; Matthew Knott; Samantha Maiden	Matt Canavan; Senator for Queensland	Mark Knight	Prime Minister meeting with Trump, AUKUS, Ambassador Kevin Rudd, Net Zero	Canberra	David Speers
40	2 November 2025	Clare Armstrong; Katina Curtis; Paul Sakkal	Murray Watt; Minister for Environment	Amanda Copp		Canberra	David Speers
41	9 November 2025	Patricia Karvela; Jason Koutsoukis; John Kehoe	Andrew Bragg; Shadow Minister for Housing	Mick Tsikas		Canberra	David Speers
42	16 November 2025	James Massola; Jennifer Hewett; Jane Norman	Penny Wong; Minister for Foreign Affairs	Benjamin Law	LNP dump Net Zero, bilateral security treaty with Indonesia, COP30	Canberra	David Speers
43	23 November 2025	Niki Savva; Tom Crowley; Mark Kenny	Sarah Hanson-Young; Senator for South Australia	Zoe Norton Lodge	LNP leadership, environment bill, COP30, social media ban	Canberra	David Speers
44	30 November 2025	Karen Middleton; Claudia Long; Paul Sakkal	David Littleproud; National Party leader	Alex Ellinghausen	Environment bill, Prime Minister's wedding, Barnaby Joyce defection	Canberra	David Speers
45	7 December 2025	Phillip Coorey; Samantha Maiden; Jacob Greber	Anthony Albanese; Prime Minister	Matt Golding, Political cartoonist of the year	Social media ban, travel expenses, Matt Price Moment	Canberra	David Speers

=== 2026 season episode listing ===
Season 25 episodes
Ep	Date	Panel	Guest interview	Talking Pictures guest	Key issues	Location	Host
1	25 January 2026	Lenore Taylor; Samantha Maiden; Matthew Knott	Anthony Albanese; Prime Minister	Mark Humphries	2025 Bondi Beach shooting, Hate speech laws in Australia, new Ambassador to USA announced, Australia Day, Liberal–National Party split	Canberra	David Speers
2	1 February 2026	Phil Coorey; Waleed Aly; Clare Armstrong	Ted O'Brien; Shadow Treasurer and Deputy Leader of The Opposition	Zoe Norton Lodge	Liberal–National Party split, inflation, interest rates	Canberra	David Speers
3	8 February 2026	Karen Middleton; John Kehoe; Paul Sakkal	Jim Chalmers; Treasurer	Amy Remeikis	Liberal–National Party split and second reunion, inflation, interest rate rise, visit of Isaac Herzog	Canberra	David Speers
4	15 February 2026	Jennifer Hewett; Jacob Greber; Natassia Chrysanthos	Jane Hume; Deputy Leader of the Opposition	Cathy Wilcox	Liberal leadership spill	Canberra	David Speers
5	22 February 2026	Niki Savva; Charles Croucher; Patricia Karvelas	Tony Bourke; Minister for Home Affairs	Zoe Norton Lodge	'ISIS Brides' repatriation, Coalition frontbench, inflation	Canberra	David Speers
6	1 March 2026 (70 minute episode)	Mark Kenny; Melissa Clarke; Shane Wright	Tim Wilson; Shadow Treasurer	Alex Lee (not broadcast)	2026 Israeli–United States strikes on Iran, live press conference by Foreign Minister Penny Wong	Canberra	David Speers
7	8 March 2026	Annabel Crabb; Samantha Maiden; Peter Hartcher	Penny Wong; Foreign Minister	Jack the Insider	2026 Iran war, Mark Carney visit to Australia	Canberra	David Speers
8	15 March 2026	Matthew Knott; Jane Norman; Jason Koutsoukis	Barnaby Joyce	Matt Roberts	2026 Iran war, David Littleproud resignation, inflation and fuel prices	Canberra	David Speers
9	22 March 2026	Paul Sakkal; Clare Armstrong; Greg Brown	Chris Bowen; Minister for Climate Change and Energy	Mark Knight	2026 South Australian state election, 2026 Iran war, inflation and fuel prices, Federal Budget	Canberra	David Speers
10	29 March 2026	Greg Sheridan; Niki Savva; Phil Coorey	Andrew Hastie; Shadow Minister for Industry	Alex Lee	EU-Australia Free Trade Agreement, 2026 Iran war, 2026 Federal Budget	Canberra	David Speers
11	12 April 2026	Jacob Greber; Karen Middleton; Waleed Aly	Catherine King; Minister for Transport	Fiona Katauskas	Fuel supply and prices, US-Iran ceasefire, PM trip to Singapore, Ben Roberts-Smith	Canberra	David Speers
12	19 April 2026	Jennifer Hewett; Osman Faruqi; Samantha Maiden	Richard Marles; Deputy Prime Minister and Minister for Defence	Cathy Wilcox	Israel-Lebanon ceasefire, US-Iran peace talks, blockade of Strait of Hormuz, fuel supply issues, new defence strategy, Coalition immigration policy	Canberra	David Speers
13	26 April 2026	Lenore Taylor; Tom Crowley; Katina Curtis	Angus Taylor; Leader of the Opposition	Michael Hing	NDIS Reforms, 2026 Farrer by-election	Canberra	David Speers
14	3 May 2026	Paul Sakkal; Anna Henderson; Daniel James	Matt Canavan; Leader of the National Party	Tom Ballard	Killing of Kumanjayi Little Baby, 2026 Farrer by-election, Royal Commission on Antisemitism and Social Cohesion, inflation	Canberra	David Speers
15	10 May 2026	Niki Savva; Greg Brown; Melissa Clark	Tim Wilson; Shadow Treasurer	Eleri Harris	2026 Farrer by-election, 2026 Australian federal budget, interest rates, inflation	Canberra	David Speers
16	17 May 2026	Phil Coorey; Alan Kohler; Samantha Maiden	Jim Chalmers; Treasurer	Jack the Insider	2026 Australian federal budget, 2026 state visit by Donald Trump to China, 2026 Strait of Hormuz crisis	Canberra	David Speers
17	24 May 2026	Mark Kenny; Clare Armstrong; Shane Wright	David Pocock; Independent Senator	Zoe Norton Lodge	2026 Australian federal budget, Capital gains tax changes, 2026 Strait of Hormuz crisis	Canberra	David Speers
18	31 May 2026	Patricia Karvelas; John Kehoe; Natassia Chrysanthos	Clare O'Neil; Minister for Housing	Amanda Copp	Inflation, housing, NACC, Teals, capital gains taxes	Canberra	David Speers
19	7 June 2026	Karen Middleton; Paul Sakkal; Waleed Aly	David Shoebridge; Greens Senator	Mick Tsikas	AUKUS, tax changes, NDIS reform, One Nation	Canberra	David Speers
20	14 June 2026	Jennifer Hewett; Cameron Stewart; Raf Epstein	Mark Butler; Health Minister	Michael Hing	One Nation surge in polls, political fundraising, inquiries into NDIS, property tax changes, Middle East, economy	Canberra	David Speers
21	21 June 2026	Peter Hartcher; Melissa Clarke; Greg Brown	Ted O'Brien; Shadow Foreign Affairs Minister	Melina Wicks	National Press Club speech by Pauline Hanson, US-Iran ceasefire deal, Capital gains tax carve-outs, tax inquiry, interest rates, fuel excise	Canberra	David Speers
22	28 June 2026	Laura Tingle; Phil Coorey; Anna Henderson	Jim Chalmers; Treasurer	Dan Ilic	Capital gains tax and negative gearing budget bill passes in the Senate, inflation, jobs and economy, new Teal party Community Strong Australia, multiculturalism	Canberra	David Speers
23	5 July 2026	Niki Savva; Daniel James; Samantha Maiden	Dan Tehan; Shadow Energy Minister	Jack the Insider	House prices, social media ban and gambling reforms, One Nation	Canberra	David Speers
24	12 July 2026	Jacob Greber; Sarah Martin; Andrew Probyn	Pat Conroy; Defence Industry Minister	Fiona Katauskas	Pacific relations, China's missile testing, Telstra outage, Prime Minister's comments about Kylie Minogue	Canberra	Patricia Karvelas
25	19 July 2026	Annabel Crabb; Katina Curtis; Paul Sakkal	Andrew Bragg; Shadow Housing Minister	Tina Quinn	AI regulation and national framework, housing, economy	Canberra	Patricia Karvelas
26	26 July 2026	Ashleigh Raper; Rafael Epstein; Greg Brown	Anthony Albanese; Prime Minister (prerecorded)	Mark Knight	2025 Australian Labor Party National Conference in Adelaide, Victorian State election	Canberra	David Speers
27	2 August 2026	James Campbell; Jacqueline Maley; Tom Crowley	Jane Hume; Deputy Leader of the Opposition	Melina Wicks (Zoe Norton Lodge, host)	Victorian Government leadership change, end of fuel excise relief, AusAlert test	Canberra	David Speers
28	9 August 2026	Samantha Maiden; Melissa Clarke; Karen Middleton; Barrie Cassidy; Paul Kelly	Sarah Hanson-Young; Greens Senator	25 years of Talking Pictures, Mike Bowers	25 years of Insiders; Gambling reform, migration quotas	Canberra	David Speers
29	16 August 2026	Lenore Taylor; Jane Norman; Mark Kenny	Jenny McAllister; NDIS Minister	Eleri Harris	NDIS reforms, interest rates, migration, gambling advertising, GST distribution	Canberra	David Speers
30	23 August 2026	Andrew Probyn; Clare Armstrong; Phil Coorey	David Farley; One Nation MP	Amy Remeikis	Gambling reforms, NDIS review, News Bargaining Incentive	Canberra	David Speers
31	30 August 2026	Anna Henderson; Ashleigh Raper; Waleed Aly	Tanya Plibersek; Social Services Minister	Cathy Wilcox	2026 Nepal–Tibet floods, data centres, migration, inflation	Canberra	David Speers
32	6 September 2026	Niki Savva; James Campbell; Karen Middleton	Jonathon Duniam; Shadow Home Affairs Minister	Ed Iffland	Economic growth, migration, housing, privacy reforms, tobacco excise duty, private health rebate, One Nation, Pacific relations	Canberra	David Speers
33	13 September 2026	Jacob Greber; Sarah Martin; Greg Brown	Anika Wells; Minister for Communications	Jack the Insider	Regulating social media algorithms, AI alarms, One Nation attacks on Andrew Hastie, superannuation access	Canberra	David Speers
34	20 September 2026	Laura Tingle; Charles Croucher; James Massola	Anthony Albanese; Prime Minister (interview by David Speers in California)	Dan Ilic	AI regulation, migration, United Nations visit, UN Security Council bid	Canberra	Patricia Karvelas
35	27 September 2026	Melissa Clarke; Greg Sheridan; Matthew Knott	Jane Hume; Deputy Opposition Leader	Zoe Norton Lodge	AI, digital safety, data breaches, inflation, interest rates	Canberra	David Speers
36	4 October 2026	Waleed Aly; Samantha Maiden; John Kehoe	Jim Chalmers; Treasurer	Jess Harwood	Inflation, fuel price increases, credit card surcharge ban, Australian Greens leadership change	Canberra	David Speers
37	11 October 2026	Peter Hartcher; Raf Epstein; Katina Curtis	Angus Taylor; Leader of the Opposition	Adam Liaw	Coalition migration policy, preCOP31 climate meeting in the Pacific, illegal tobacco, housing	Canberra	David Speers
38	18 October 2026	Lenore Taylor; Paul Sakkal; Anna Henderson	Daniel Mulino; Assistant Treasurer	Fiona Katauskas	Interest rates	Canberra	David Speers
39	25 October 2026	Niki Savva; Mark Kenny; Greg Brown	Krissy Barrett; AFP Commissioner	Eleri Harris	Helen Haines attack in Wangaratta, political violence	Canberra	David Speers
40	1 November 2026	Phil Coorey; Jacqueline Malley; Tom Crowley	Katy Gallagher; Finance Minister	Mick Tsikas	EV subsidies, inflation, interest rates	Canberra	David Speers
41	8 November 2026	Samantha Maiden; Andrew Probyn; Clare Armstrong	Matt Canavan; Leader of the National Party	Mark Humphries	Interest rate rise, inflation, data centres	Canberra	David Speers
