= Speers Tonight =

2016–2017 Australian television series

- Title card of Speers Tonight
- Genre: Current affairs, Commentary
- Presented by: David Speers
- Country of origin: Australia
- Original language: English

Production
- Running time: 60 minutes (inc. adverts)

Original release
- Network: Sky News Australia
- Release: 28 January 2016 – 22 December 2017

Related
- The Nation with David Speers

Speers Tonight is an Australian television program on Sky News Australia. The program sees host David Speers interview a prominent guest, followed by a discussion of political issues from the week with journalists Paul Kelly and Peter Hartcher. The weekly program replaced similar format The Nation with David Speers on Thursday nights and was one of two programs hosted by Speers, the other being the four-times weekly PM Agenda.

The program debuted on 28 January 2016 with Anthony Albanese as the inaugural guest.

Episode 42 of the first season is the highest rated regular episode of Speers Tonight, when it was watched by 49,000 viewers, making it the third most viewed Sky News program and sixth most watched program on the Foxtel platform for that day. A special post-American election episode was watched by 89,000 viewers, ranked as the sixth most watched program on both Sky News and Foxtel for that day.

== Episodes ==
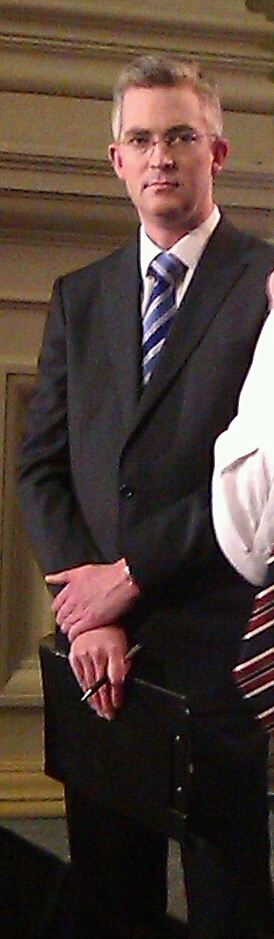
David Speers, host of Speers Tonight.

=== Season 1 (2016) ===
No.	Guest(s)	Original release date
1	Anthony Albanese	28 January 2016
2	Mike Baird	4 February 2016
3	Andrew Robb	11 February 2016
4	Ken Morrison, John Daley, David Kilcullen	18 February 2016
5	Clive Palmer	25 February 2016
6	Stephen Conroy	3 March 2016
7	John Howard	10 March 2016
8	Richard Di Natale, Thomas Lembong	17 March 2016
9	David Morrison	24 March 2016
10	Daniel Andrews	31 March 2016
11	Peter Dutton, Li Cunxin	7 April 2016
12	Josh Frydenberg, Gillon McLachlan, Peter Arkell	14 April 2016
13	Fiona Nash, Nick Xenophon	21 April 2016
14	Marise Payne	28 April 2016
15	Jennifer Westacott, Malcolm Turnbull	5 May 2016
16^{[Note A]}	Brendan O'Connor	12 May 2016
17	Catherine King	19 May 2016
18	no guests	26 May 2016
19	Bronwyn Bishop	2 June 2016
20	Patrick McGorry, John Daley, Stephen Koukoulas	9 June 2016
21	Richard Di Natale	16 June 2016
22	David McCann, Paul O'Donnell, Tracy Colgan, Elena Douglas	23 June 2016
23	Forum with group of undecided voters	30 June 2016
24	Kieran Gilbert, Laura Jayes, Peter van Onselen	7 July 2016
25^{[Note B]}	Tom Switzer, Mark Kenny, Katherine Murphy	14 July 2016
26	Brian Loughnane, Michael Gannon, Cathy O'Toole	21 July 2016
27	Adam Giles, Bruce Wolpe	28 July 2016
28	Nick Xenophon, Tom Rogers	4 August 2016
29	Bob Carr, Josh Frydenberg	11 August 2016
30	Scott Morrison, Peter Aspinall	18 August 2016
31	Rod Culleton	1 September 2016
32	Phil Coorey, Andrew Probyn, Mark Dreyfus	8 September 2016
33	Scott Morrison, Everald Compton	15 September 2016
34	Michael Sukkar, Ron Petersen	22 September 2016
35	Nick Xenophon, Will Steffen	29 September 2016
36^{[Note C]}	Frank Jotzo, Brendan Pearson, Miles Kupa, Mark Kenny, Phil Coorey, Andrew Stock	6 October 2016
37	Troy Grant, Jason Crusan	13 October 2016
38	John Williams, Kate Ellis, Jonathan Mann	20 October 2016
39	Bob Walker, Thomas Wright	27 October 2016
40	Michael Green, Adam Creighton	3 November 2016
41^{[Note D]}	Richard Marles, Steven Ciobo, Georgina Downer, David Smith	9 November 2016
42	Michael Meehan, Barnaby Joyce	10 November 2016
43	Jacinta Price, Duncan McFetridge	17 November 2016
44	George Christensen, Roger Carr	24 November 2016
45	Richard Di Natale, Ian Quin, Kate Ellis	1 December 2016
46	Noel Pearson, Tony Wood, Nigel Scullion	8 December 2016
47	Zed Seselja, Anne Aly, John Daley	15 December 2016
48	Michael Keenan, Sarah Martin, James Massola, Nic Marchesi	22 December 2016

=== Season 2 (2017) ===
No.	Guest(s)	Original release date
1	Forum with residents of Morwell, Victoria	2 February 2017
2	Steven Ciobo, Paul Collins	9 February 2017
3	Julie Bishop, Dean Smith	16 February 2017
4	Tony Wood, Danny Price, Peter Burn, Olivia Kember, Martin Ferguson	23 February 2017
5	Barnaby Joyce	2 March 2017
6	Ashleigh Gillon, Gareth Parker, Gary Gray	9 March 2017
7	John Alexander, Paul Broad	16 March 2017
8	Penny Wong, Dr Paul Quinnett, Kim Ruocco	23 March 2017
9	Derryn Hinch, Bronwyn Bishop, Everald Compton	30 March 2017
10	Arthur Sinodinos, Anna Bligh, Hugh White	6 April 2017
11	Silma Ihram, Anna Brown, Danielle Wood	13 April 2017
12	Peter Dutton, Nick Xenophon	20 April 2017
13	Jim Chalmers, Matt Canavan, Janine Perrett, David Weishrot	27 April 2017
14	Simon Birmingham, Gladys Berejiklian, Cecil Wiswell	4 May 2017
15	Tony Burke, Arthur Sinodinos, Samantha Maiden	11 May 2017
16	David Murray, Andrew Shearer, Jonathan Taplin	18 May 2017
17	Anne Aly	25 May 2017
18	Greg Barton, Warren Mundine	1 June 2017
19^{[Note E]}	Mark Butler, Phil Coorey, Malcolm Farr, Matthew Warren, Latika Bourke	8 June 2017
20	Noel Pearson, Mark Leibler, Cory Bernardi, Julian Leeser	15 June 2017
21	Peter Dutton	22 June 2017
22	Ingrid Irwin, John Edwards	29 June 2017
23	Mathias Cormann, Leonid Petrov, Michael Wesley	6 July 2017
24	Amin Saikal, Josh Frydenberg	13 July 2017
25^{[Note F]}	Eric Abetz, Lyle Shelton, Harris Faulkner	20 July 2017
26	Dan Tehan, serving members of the Australian Defence Force	27 July 2017
27^{[Note G]}	Jim Chalmers, Jim Stanford, Ged Kearney	3 August 2017
28^{[Note H]}	Bob Carr, Hugh White	10 August 2017
29	Wayne Swan, Ed Balls, Scott Morrison	17 August 2017
30	Peter Leahy, Thomas Wright	24 August 2017
31	Mark Butler, Khalid Koser	31 August 2017
32	Tim Wilson, Cory Bernardi, Sarah Martin	7 September 2017
33	Bill Bashford, Nigel Scullion	14 September 2017
34	Frank Brennan, Jim Bolger	21 September 2017
35	Mark Coleridge	28 September 2017
36	Mark McGowan, Greg Barton, Roger Bradbury	5 October 2017
37	Brian Owler, Alistair MacGibbon	12 October 2017
38	Rodney Syme, Mark Yates, James O'Doherty	19 October 2017
39	Kevin Rudd, Ken Wyatt	26 October 2017
40	Barnaby Joyce, Kim Rubenstein	2 November 2017
41	Gladys Berejiklian, Nelson Cunningham	9 November 2017
42	John Howard	23 November 2017
43	Peter Switzer, Andrew Broad, Phil Coorey, Malcolm Farr	30 November 2017
44	Bridget McKenzie	7 December 2017
45	Penny Wong, Fiona Jose, Francis J. Sullivan	14 December 2017
46	Tom Connell, Kerry-Anne Walsh, Sarah Martin	22 December 2017

=== Notes ===
- ^{Note A} Episode 16 was hosted by Peter van Onselen while Speers was on parental leave.
- ^{Note B} Episode 25 was hosted by Kristina Keneally while Speers was on holidays. Additionally, neither Hartcher or Kelly appeared.
- ^{Note C} Episode 36 was hosted by Kieran Gilbert while Speers was on holidays. Additionally, neither Hartcher or Kelly appeared.
- ^{Note D} Episode 41 aired on a Wednesday as a special episode following coverage of the 2016 United States presidential election.
- ^{Note E} Episode 19 was hosted by Kieran Gilbert while Speers was on assignment, filming segments for the following episode of Speers Tonight. Additionally, neither Hartcher or Kelly appeared.
- ^{Note F} Episode 25 was hosted by Peter van Onselen while Speers was on leave.
- ^{Note G} Episode 27 was hosted by Samantha Maiden while Speers was on leave.
- ^{Note H} Episode 28 was hosted by Kieran Gilbert while Speers was on leave.
