= James Massola =

Australian journalist and author

James Massola is an Australian journalist and author, currently the National Affairs Editor for The Age and The Sydney Morning Herald.

== Early life ==
Massola grew up in Melbourne, Victoria and graduated from Xavier College, and then Monash University with a master's degree in International Relations. His great uncle is Aldo Massola, an anthropologist, author and museum curator.

== Career ==
He moved to Canberra in 2007 and worked in the Canberra Press Gallery for 10 years, mostly for Fairfax Media. He began working for The Age and the Sydney Morning Herald in January 2014.

In October 2017, he announced via Twitter that he was leaving the job of chief political correspondent and in 2018 took up the job of south-east Asia correspondent for the newspapers.

In November 2018, Allen and Unwin published his first book, The Great Cave Rescue, about the rescue of the Wild Boars football team from the Tham Luang cave in Thailand in July 2018. The book was published by Duckworth Books in the UK in October 2019.

== Outing of Greg Jericho ==
During the campaign for the 2010 federal election, ABC managing director Mark Scott cited a posting by Greg Jericho in a speech on the topic of the media coverage of the election. Jericho's opinion was that coverage of the election had been driven by polls rather than policy, and that the public interest was suffering as a result. At the same time, Jericho attended and live-blogged the "media140" conference, which was also attended News Limited journalist James Massola. During the conference, Massola and Jericho were seated at the same table, although Jericho states that the two did not speak on the day.

On 27 September, Massola wrote an article in The Australian entitled "Controversial political blogger unmasked as a federal public servant". In it, Massola revealed Jericho's real name and that he was an employee of the Australian Public Service, justifying the outing on the grounds that "the prolific blogger shows a strong preference for the ALP, despite the Public Service code of conduct stating that "the APS is apolitical"". In a follow-up article on 28 September, Massola expanded further on his reasons for naming Jericho, claiming that "the fact he had a partisan point of view, worked in the public service and wrote about his department was a matter of public interest" and "Jericho's decision to 'live blog' the Media 140 conference (was it a sick day, a day in lieu, annual leave, did he clear it with his supervisor?) made my mind up."

Massola's article attracted a mixed response, some critical and some supportive. Bernard Keane wrote in Crikey that rather than discuss the content of Jericho's blog, Massola had just launched "a malicious, hypocritical ad hominem attack on him" and pointed out the hypocrisy of The Australian running anonymous opinion columns itself. ABC journalist Jonathon Green opined that "Jericho made the fatal mistake of making them angry, of impugning the conduct of Australian journalism during an election campaign in which the media slowly became a significant part of the story; not so much for what it did but for the debate it let rot and degenerate. Outing him is payback", while journalist Tim Dunlop argued that "It is not their [The Australian's] role to deprive someone of their privacy when they are engaged in a legal activity". James Paterson wrote that Massola's article was "a legitimate story in the public interest".

== Awards ==
Massola was a finalist in the Walkley awards for journalism for reporting with Peter Hartcher a detailed leak from former Australian Prime Minister Tony Abbott's cabinet. In 2016 he was a finalist in the Quills for the David Feeney residence scandal and in 2017 he was part of the team that won the Grant Hattam Quill award for investigative journalism into the Sam Dastyari Chinese influence story, involving Huang Xiangmo. In 2019 he was named "outstanding foreign correspondent" in the Kennedy Awards.
