= Timothy Blair =

Tim or Timothy Blair may refer to:

- Tim Blair (born 1965), Australian journalist and commentator
- Tim Dog (born Timothy Blair, 1967–2013), American rapper
- Timothy Blair Pardee (1830–1889), Canadian lawyer and politician
