= Greg Jericho =

Australian civil servant, blogger & journalist

Greg Jericho is an Australian civil servant, blogger, and journalist. He came to prominence during the 2010 Australian federal election when Australian Broadcasting Corporation director Mark Scott referenced his blog Grog's Gamut during a speech. He was subsequently outed by News Limited journalist James Massola, a move that provoked widespread condemnation and criticism amongst the Australian blogging community. After a break from blogging following his outing, Jericho has been blogging and providing opinion items for other outlets, including the ABC. He has been an economics writer for The Guardian since 2013.

== Early life ==
Jericho spent some time working at the Cairns Casino as a table dealer. During this time, Jericho wrestled with the issue of taking money from problem gamblers, which "sent (him) very close to the edge". He later referred to his period working in the casino as "the most depressing time of my life".

Jericho has an honours degree in economics and a PhD in English literature, which he completed at James Cook University in 2005. Between 2006 and 2011 he worked in Canberra in the Australian Public Service, mostly in the film-policy division.

Among other things, Jericho has said that he has wanted to be prime minister of Australia, captain of the Australian cricket team and a winner of the Booker Prize, but eventually settled for just being a blogger.

== Blog ==
Jericho began blogging as Grog's Gamut in July 2008, his first post on the Tour de France. His blog primarily discusses classic films, sports and Australian politics, and has no fixed update schedule, although a new article is usually posted every few days. When blogging on politics, Jericho is frequently critical of Australia's conservative Coalition parties, and has been described as "partisan".

=== Outing ===
During the campaign for the 2010 federal election, ABC managing director Mark Scott cited a posting by Jericho in a speech on the topic of the media coverage of the election. Jericho's opinion was that coverage of the election had been driven by polls rather than policy, and that the public interest was suffering as a result. At the same time, Jericho attended and live-blogged the "media140" conference, which was also attended by News Limited journalist James Massola. During the conference, Massola and Jericho were seated at the same table, although Jericho states that the two did not speak on the day.

On 27 September, Massola wrote an article in The Australian, "Controversial political blogger unmasked as a federal public servant". In it, Massola revealed Jericho's real name and that he was an employee of the Australian Public Service, justifying the outing on the grounds that "the prolific blogger shows a strong preference for the ALP, despite the public service code of conduct stating that 'the APS is apolitical'". In a follow-up article on 28 September, Massola expanded further on his reasons for naming Jericho, claiming that "the fact he had a partisan point of view, worked in the public service and wrote about his department was a matter of public interest" and "Jericho's decision to 'live blog' the Media 140 conference (was it a sick day, a day in lieu, annual leave, did he clear it with his supervisor?) made my mind up."

Reaction to Massola's article was scathing. Bernard Keane wrote in Crikey that rather than discuss the content of Jericho's blog, Massola had just launched "a malicious, hypocritical ad hominem attack on him" and pointed out the hypocrisy of The Australian running anonymous opinion columns itself. ABC journalist Jonathon Green opined that "Jericho made the fatal mistake of making them angry, of impugning the conduct of Australian journalism during an election campaign in which the media slowly became a significant part of the story; not so much for what it did but for the debate it let rot and degenerate. Outing him is payback", while journalist Tim Dunlop argued that "It is not their (The Australian's) role to deprive someone of their privacy when they are engaged in a legal activity.".

== Journalist ==
After leaving the public service in 2011, Jericho worked as a researcher for several ABC and SBS series. In 2013 he was hired by The Guardian as an economics writer for its new Australian edition.

== Other activities ==
In February 2022, Jericho joined The Australia Institute as a policy director in labour and fiscal economics within its Centre for Future Work. He was appointed as the think tank's chief economist in July 2023.
