= Matt Price =

Australian journalist

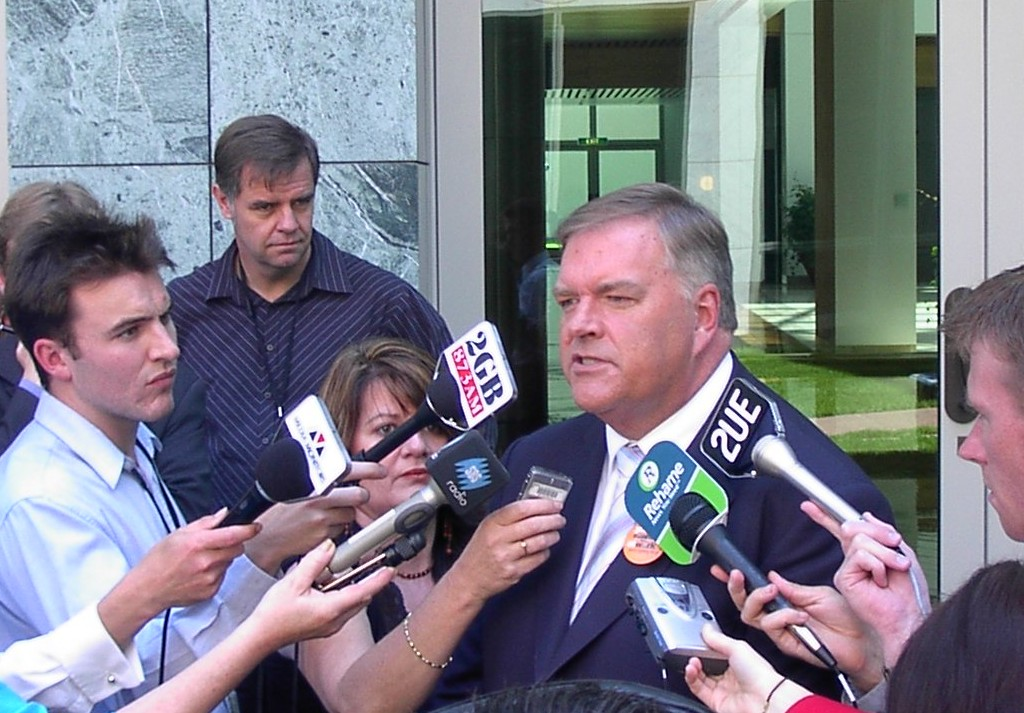
- Price, in the background in the purple shirt, watches Kim Beazley at a press conference in November 2005
- Born: 15 October 1961
- Died: 25 November 2007 (aged 46)

Matt Price (15 October 1961 – 25 November 2007) was an Australian journalist and newspaper columnist.

Price was from Western Australia and was educated at Newman College, Churchlands and the University of Western Australia, from which he graduated with a Bachelor of Arts degree in 1984. He worked for the Albany Advertiser and Perth's Daily News, and covered federal politics as a member of the Canberra Press Gallery for The Australian newspaper, writing a regular column entitled "The Sketch" which often took a humorous view of parliamentary proceedings. He also occasionally wrote about sport. He worked in television, including stints at Channel Nine and Sky News, and was a regular guest on the ABC Television program Insiders.

Price was a supporter of the Fremantle Dockers, a team based in Fremantle that competes in the AFL, and regularly wrote columns about them in The Australian. Matt placed a collection of his best work together in a book entitled "Way to Go: Sadness, Euphoria and the Fremantle Dockers".

In early October 2007, Price was diagnosed with multiple brain tumours (glioblastoma multiforme). He died on 25 November 2007. The prime minister-elect, Kevin Rudd, said of his death that "I am shocked and deeply saddened by the news of Matt Price's death. He had emerged in recent years as one of the greats of the new generation of Australian journalists."

Price was married to Sue and had three children. His brother Richard, a barrister, is married to Senator Michaelia Cash.

== Publications ==
Way to Go: Sadness, Euphoria and the Fremantle Dockers (2003)
Top Price: The Australian's Matt Price on Sport, Politics, Music and Life (2008)
