= Canberra Press Gallery =

Journalists reporting Australian federal politics

Federal Parliamentary Press Gallery
- Formation: 9 May 1901
- Headquarters: Parliament House, Canberra
- Members: 250 (2025)
- President: Jane Norman (ABC News)
- Vice-President: Katina Curtis (The West Australian)
- Secretary: Tom McIlroy (Guardian Australia)
- Treasurer: Guy Southwell (Nine News)
- Website: Canberra Press Gallery

The Canberra Press Gallery, officially called the Federal Parliamentary Press Gallery, is the name given to the approximately 250 journalists and their support staff, including producers, editors and camera crews, who report the workings of the Australian Parliament. The name derives from the press galleries, which are viewing galleries behind the president of the Senate and the Speaker of the House of Representatives respectively that have been allocated to the media.

== Use of the name ==
The expression "Canberra Press Gallery" also refers to the association of Gallery journalists which represents their professional interests in dealing with the Parliament. The current president of the Gallery is the ABC's Jane Norman. The vice-president is Katina Curtis, the secretary is Jade Tom McIlroy and the treasurer is Guy Southwell.

Apart from the one and a half hours per sitting day of Question Time, journalists spend little time in the actual press gallery overlooking the floor of Parliament. Another area, also named the "press gallery" refers to the office space within the Parliament building, above the Senate chamber which includes television studios and radio booths where the gallery journalists spend most of their time compiling stories and communicating with editors.

== Role and influence ==
Australian academics have described the gallery as 'collectively responsible for the great majority of news stories about federal politics that appear in Australian Print and broadcast media'.

Many of Australia's most influential journalists, such as Paul Bongiorno, Malcolm Farr, Michelle Grattan, Laurie Oakes, Glenn Milne, Mark Riley, Hugh Riminton, Dennis Shanahan, Jim Middleton, Karen Middleton, Sharri Markson, Phil Coorey, Chris Uhlmann and David Speers are or have been gallery members.

== Media affiliations ==
Studios for the major TV networks are among the gallery; including the ABC, SBS, Channel Nine, News24, Channel Seven, Network 10 and other media partners.

Major newspapers that participate in the gallery include The Australian Financial Review, The Sydney Morning Herald, The Age, The Australian, The Daily Telegraph, the Herald Sun, The Courier-Mail, The West Australian, The Advertiser, The Canberra Times as well as Guardian Australia.

== Gallery ==
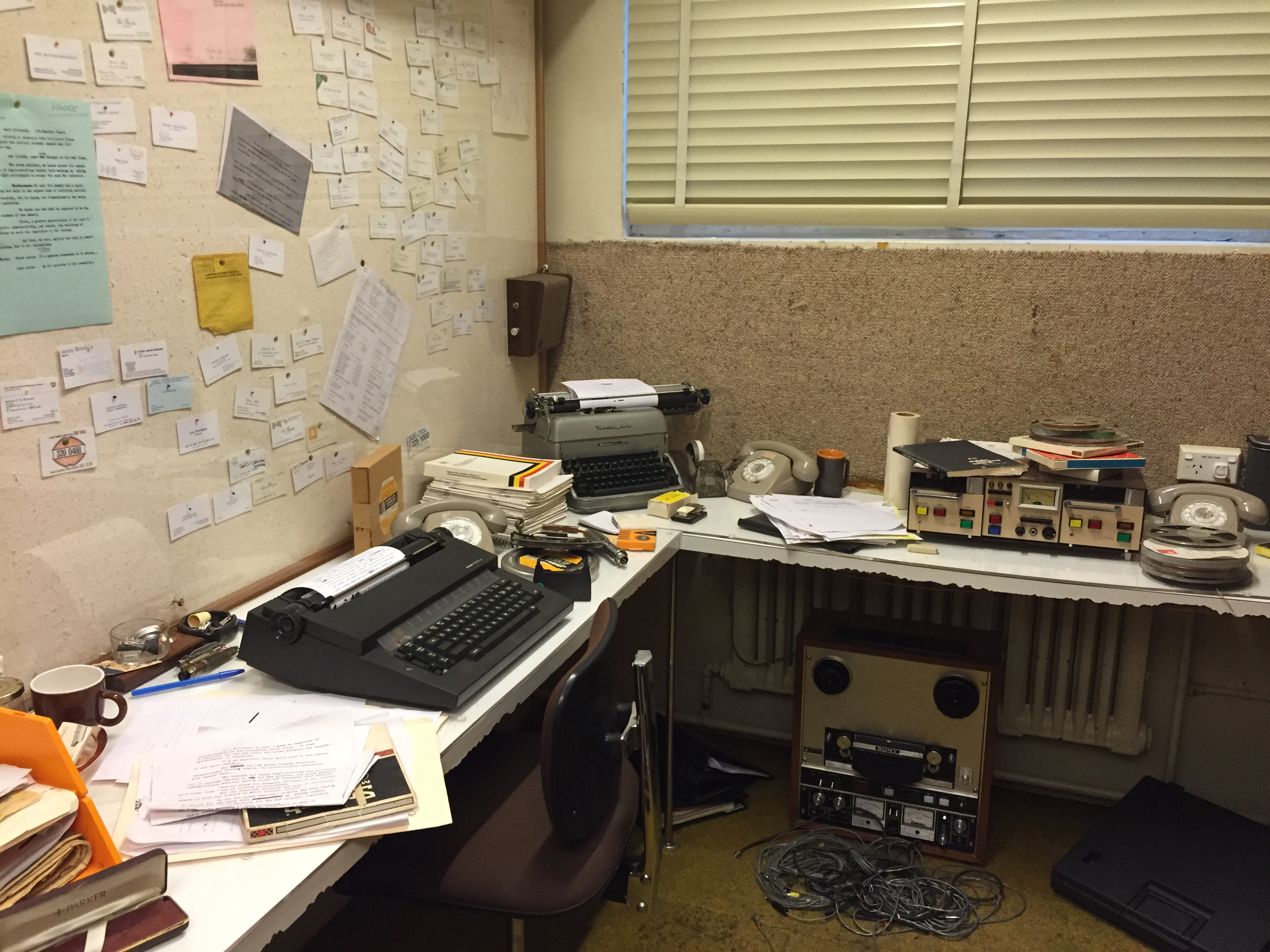
Recreation of a journalist's desk from the 1980s, at the Museum of Australian Democracy in Old Parliament House, Canberra
