= Malcolm Farr =

Australian political journalist

- Born: 2 August 1951 (age 75)
- Occupation: Journalist
- Website: Malcolm Farr on Twitter

Malcolm Farr (born 2 August 1951) is a political journalist in the Canberra Press Gallery covering the Parliament of Australia in Canberra, Australia.

== Work ==
Based in Canberra, Farr was the National Political Editor for News.com.au and contributing writer to The Punch. Most recently he was writing for The Guardian Australia in January 2025.

He has worked for a number of Australian publications including The Daily Telegraph, The Daily Mirror, Brisbane Sun and The Australian.

Farr regularly appeared on political current affairs programs Meet the Press on Network Ten, and ABC TV's Insiders.

Farr also served as President of the Federal Parliamentary Press Gallery until 2005.
