= Mike Seccombe =

Australian journalist

Mike Seccombe is an Australian journalist. He is The Saturday Paper's national correspondent, and appears regularly as a panelist for Insiders on ABC TV.

== Career ==
According to the Guardian Australia's website, Seccombe covered national affairs and politics for The Sydney Morning Herald and from 2006 to 2011, he lived on Martha's Vineyard, Massachusetts writing for the Vineyard Gazette. He is now a national correspondent for The Saturday Paper. He is a regular panelist on the ABC Insiders program.
