= Jon Kudelka =

Australian cartoonist (1972–2026)

- Born: 22 February 1972; Burnie, Tasmania, Australia
- Died: 8 February 2026 (aged 53); Hobart, Tasmania, Australia
- Citizenship: Australian
- Years active: 1993–2026
- Known for: Cartoonist for The Saturday Paper
- Website: kudelka.com.au

Jonathan Oscar Kudelka (22 February 1972 – 8 February 2026) was an Australian editorial cartoonist. His work has regularly appeared in The Australian, The Mercury and The Saturday Paper.

== Life and career ==
Kudelka was born in Burnie, Tasmania on 22 February 1972. He obtained a Bachelor of Science from the University of Tasmania. In 2008, he won the Stanley Award for best editorial/political cartoonist, as well as the Walkley Award for best cartoon. In 2018 he won a second Walkley for a cartoon about Uluru, while in 2019 he won the Vince O’Farrell Award for Outstanding Cartoon at the Kennedy Awards. published over 10,000 cartoons.

Kudelka was diagnosed with glioblastoma in early 2024. He died in Hobart on 8 February 2026, at the age of 53.
