= Fiona Katauskas =

Australian cartoonist (born 1969)

- Born: 1969 (age 56–57)
- Education: Australian National University
- Known for: Political cartoons
- Awards: Jim Russell Award, 2022; Political Cartoonist of the Year, 2023

Fiona Katauskas (born 1969) is an Australian political cartoonist at the Guardian Australia. She won the Jim Russell Award in 2022 for her contribution to Australian cartooning.

Katauskas was born in 1969. She attended the Australian National University majoring in political science. She has been creating cartoons since 1997 and her work has appeared in The Age, The Australian, Australian Financial Review, The Bulletin, Eureka Street, New Matilda and The Sydney Morning Herald.

Katauskas has written and illustrated two books for children. Her first, The Amazing True Story of How Babies Are Made, was shortlisted for the Eve Pownall Award for Information Books at the 2016 Children's Book Council of Australia Awards Book of the Year Awards.

The State Library of New South Wales holds 300 of her original works created between 1998 and 2022.

== Awards and honours ==
She won the Cartoon On The Night at the 2017 Stanley Awards. She received the Jim Russell Award at the 2022 Stanleys, recognising her contribution to Australian cartooning. She was named Political Cartoonist of the Year in 2023 by the Museum of Australian Democracy.

== Publications ==
- The Amazing True Story of How Babies Are Made (HarperCollins, 2015)
- Hi From Outer Space (Allen & Unwin, 2024)
