= Darren Davidson =

British and Australian journalist

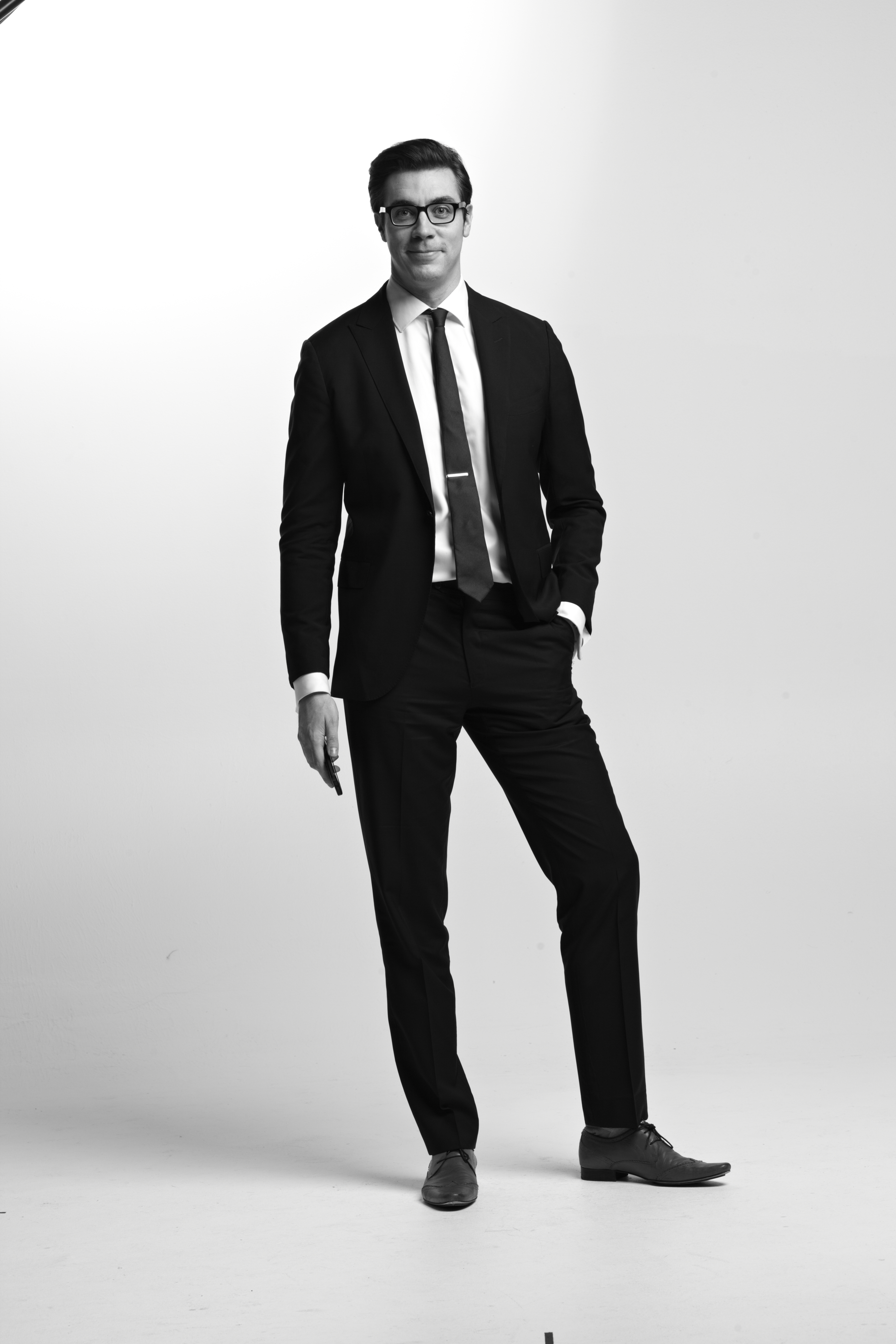
- Davidson at The Australian
- Born: London, England
- Occupations: Managing editor and commercial director, The Australian
- Children: 2

Darren Davidson is a British and Australian journalist. He is the managing editor and commercial director of The Australian newspaper.

Davidson was born in the United Kingdom. He holds a BA Hons in History. After university, Davidson undertook a journalist apprenticeship with the National Council for the Training of Journalists.

He began his career in London, writing for local newspapers, business-to-business magazines and national newspapers, including The Daily Telegraph.

Davidson became media editor of The Australian in November 2015 after joining The Australian in 2011.

Davidson was the editor-in-chief of Storyful, a news and video company owned and operated by News Corp. Based at News Corp's New York headquarters, Davidson led editorial and commercial activities between 2018 and 2023.

In 2017, The Australian exposed how Facebook targeted emotionally vulnerable teenagers. In an interview with The Front, Davidson recounts how he uncovered the story, what the investigation revealed, Facebook’s extraordinary efforts to suppress it, and why its impact continues to reverberate years later.
