= Phil Coorey =

Australian journalist

- Occupation: Journalist
- Years active: 1998–present
- Employer: The Australian Financial Review
- Awards: Paul Lyneham Award (2012)

Phillip Coorey is an Australian journalist, currently serving as the political editor for The Australian Financial Review.

Coorey has covered federal politics since 1998, beginning as political correspondent for The Advertiser. In 2003, he spent two years as a New York correspondent for News Corp Australia, before returning to Canberra as the political editor of The Advertiser.

He became chief political correspondent at Fairfax Media's The Sydney Morning Herald in 2006. During his seven years at the paper, he gained a reputation for being a journalist with key contacts on both sides of politics, who breaks major political stories. He won the Paul Lyneham Award for Canberra press gallery excellence in 2012 and again in 2013. In 2012, Coorey defected to sister newspaper The Australian Financial Review.

Coorey has appeared on political panel television programs such as Insiders and Speers Tonight.

== Personal life ==
Coorey is married to Fleur Anderson, a fellow journalist at The Australian Financial Review.
