= The Nation with David Speers =

2015–2016 Australian TV news analysis series

- Genre: Current affairs, Commentary
- Directed by: Harry Michaels
- Presented by: David Speers
- Country of origin: Australia
- Original language: English

Production
- Production locations: Silk Studios, Willoughby, New South Wales
- Camera setup: Multi-camera
- Running time: 60 minutes (inc. adverts)

Original release
- Network: Sky News Australia
- Release: 2015 – 2016

Related
- Speers Tonight

The Nation with David Speers is an Australian television program on Sky News Australia. The program discusses political issues of the week with a panel of political contributors, moderated by host David Speers. The weekly program was one of two shows hosted by Speers, the other being the four-times weekly PM Agenda.

The program was filmed at Silk Studios in the Sydney suburb of Willoughby, Where other select Sky News panel programs are filmed such as Richo + Jones and The Cabinet.

The program did not return in 2016, instead replaced by Speers Tonight.
