= Cameron Stewart (journalist) =

Australian journalist

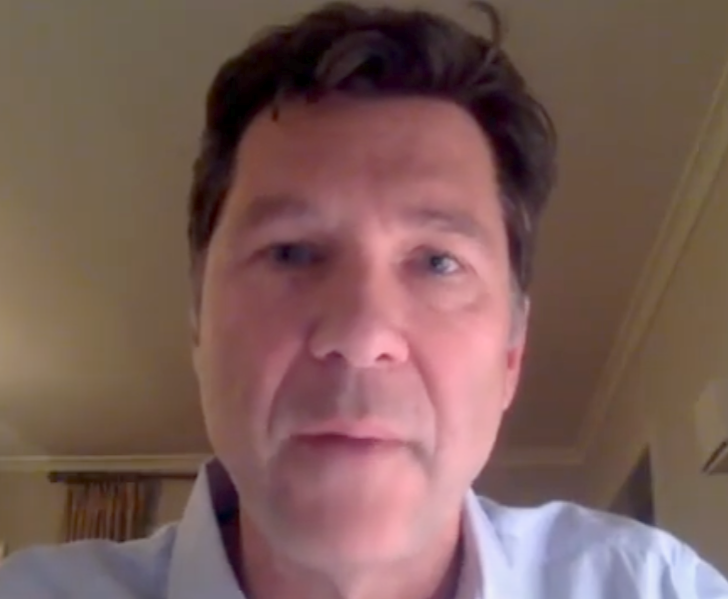
- In a Lowy Institute video in 2018
- Occupation: Journalist

Cameron Stewart is an Australian award-winning journalist and chief international correspondent at The Australian.

Stewart reported in 2016 on a leak of documents containing technical and design information of the Scorpène-class submarine. The story won him a nomination for the 2017 Lowy Institute Media Award.

He was The Australian's New York correspondent during the late 1990s and the Washington correspondent covering the United States from 2017 until 2021.

Stewart has appeared as panellist on ABC TV programs Insiders and Q+A. In 2024, Stewart was one of three judges on the panel of the Graham Perkin Australian Journalist of the Year Award, and was the deputy chair of the Walkley Award judging board.

== Awards ==
- 2008: Graham Perkin Australian Journalist of the Year Award
- 2009: Quill Award
- 2016: Elizabeth O'Neill Journalism Award
- 2023: European Union – Qantas Journalism Award
- 2024: The Bragg UNSW Press Prize for Science Writing
