= 2024 Australian federal budget =

- Submitted to: House of Representatives
- Presented: 14 May 2024
- Parliament: 47th Parliament of Australia
- Government: Albanese Government
- Party: Australian Labor Party
- Treasurer: Jim Chalmers
- Total revenue: A$711.5 billion
- Total expenditures: A$734.5 billion
- Tax cuts: A$1,888 on average
- Debt payment: A$23.8 billion
- Surplus: A$9.3 billion
- Deficit: A$28.3 billion
- Debt: 33.9% of GDP
- Website: budget.gov.au

The 2024 Australian federal budget was presented on 14 May 2024 by Treasurer Jim Chalmers. The budget dictated how the Australian Government would allocate an estimated A$715 billion across the federal government and to the state and territory governments. It was the third federal budget handed down by the Labor Party since their victory in 2022. The consultation period described the budget as focused on support for Australians and creating a "stronger, more inclusive and more sustainable economy".

== Pre-budget ==
=== Predictions and commentary ===
With global inflation decreasing and markets stabilising, the ABC predicted that the budget would focus less on mitigating the impacts of inflation and instead address "trouble in China, sluggish growth, and the ever-present pressures on government spending." All three 'threats' to the budget have been raised by the International Monetary Fund, with a property-driven slow-down effecting the Chinese economy and its import-export markets and the anticipated recommendations from a number of inquiries across the health and aged care, education and social services sectors. Global consulting firm KPMG anticipates the budget will focus on cost of living challenges, investment in infrastructure, and emission reduction initiatives.

Independent economist Chris Richardson described the government's position as "rolling in cash" as a result of temporary improvements from a stronger-than-expected economy resulting in greater income tax receipts, and higher commodity prices pushing corporate tax revenue up. Richardson however advised against "using temporary good news to spend big", noting that these financial improvements are likely to reduce. During a press conference with the Committee for Economic Development in Australia, Chalmers said there would be no "big cash splashes", in part due to already declining iron ore prices and "softening labour market", and that much of the leading items had already been announced including an expansion of the NDIS, university reforms and aged care changes.

It was forecast that inflation could return to the target band of between two and three per cent, by the end of 2024.

==== Political importance ====
Political reporter Brett Worthington surmised in his analysis that the federal budget will likely deliver an overall surplus for the second year in a row with massive political significance. The Australian Labor Party is frequently criticised by the opposing Liberal Party for what is seen as financial mismanagement, however Worthington highlights that the Liberal-led coalition had failed to deliver a single surplus budget during its nine years of power until 2022. The 2023–24 budget was the first federal surplus in 15 years, with a final surplus of more than A$22 billion, an improvement of more than A$100 billion since Labor won the 2022 federal elections from the coalition.

== Announcements ==
On Wednesday 17 April, defence minister Richard Marles announced more than A$50 billion of extra funding for the Australian Defence Force over 10 years, bringing total military spending to 2.4% of the national GDP. Marles also announced the budget would include the re-allocation of an additional A$72.8 billion in planned spending, and an immediate A$1 billion injection to "accelerate long-range missiles and targeting systems, as well as lethal autonomous systems." Included in the conference at the National Press Club was a renewed focus on sea passages throughout South-East Asia and projecting Australia's defence capabilities throughout the region.

Students, welfare recipients and taxpayers were expected to be significant beneficiaries of the budget. Stage three tax cuts and student debt relief had been announced, with welfare support and energy bill relief highlighted in the lead up to the budget.

A 6 May announcement included details on a "Commonwealth Prac Payment" of $319.50 per week, to support teaching, nursing, midwifery and social work students during mandatory unpaid placements for their degrees. In an effort to alleviate the housing supply crisis about $90 million is being spent to cover the education costs of 20,000 people which the government hopes will boost the sector.

Every household will receive a $300 energy bill credit. A rebate of $325 has been allocated towards 1 million small businesses receiving an energy bill. There will be a 10 per cent increase to Commonwealth rent assistance.

$1 billion will be spent on crisis and transitional accommodation for women and children fleeing family violence.

Under the 'Future Made in Australia' program, a $22.7 billion investment aims to support renewable energy manufacturing and exports to help fight climate change.

== Financial measures ==
=== Balance sheet ===
It was projected that the budget would provide a surplus for the third year in a row, with a predicted balance of A$9.3 billion. However, the budget was released with a total annual deficit of A$23.8 billion attributed to cost-of-living relief measures and extensions to some time-limited funding. The annual deficit was originally thought to grow to A$42.8 billion for 2025–26, however that figure was revised to A$34.5 billion (representing A$8.3 billion in improvements), and is further predicted to decrease to A$10.1 billion by 2027–28.

The budget includes total government expenditure totalling A$734 billion (26.6% of GDP), an increase from the previous year but projected to reduce from 2025–26 onwards.

=== Spending and revenue by category ===
The 2024-25 Budget Snapshot produced by the Parliamentary Budget Office provides a high-level overview of government spending and revenue projected from the budget. Total Federal Budget Spending was 25.97% of Australia's GDP.

Federal government spending by major category
Major category	Spending	Percent of government spending
Social security and welfare	A$263 billion	36.8%
Health	A$108.9 billion	15.2%
General purpose inter-governmental transactions	A$99.9 billion	14%
Other	A$60.3 billion	8.4%
Defence	A$44.57 billion	6.2%
Education	A$38.6 billion	5.4%
General public services	A$30.1 billion	4.2%
Interest	A$23.9 billion	3.3%
Transport and communication	A$17.7 billion	2.5%
Fuel and energy	A$16.5 billion	2.3%

Federal government revenue by major category
Major category	Revenue	Percent of government revenue
Individuals and withholding tax	A$335.6 billion	47.1%
Company tax	A$141 billion	19.9%
Goods and services tax	A$92 billion	12.9%
Non-taxation revenue	A$52.6 billion	7.4%
Excise and customs duty	A$47.28 billion	6.6%
Other taxes	A$23 billion	3.2%
Superannuation fund taxes	A$19.8 billion	2.8%

== Opposition and crossbench response ==
The opposition approved of new budget measures that addressed the cost of living. In the days after the budget's release the lack of means testing for the energy bill relief was criticised.

== Reception ==
The Australian Council of Social Service said the budget failed to deliver the solutions needed. The Salvation Army Australia welcomed any assistance at this time of need. The Australian Conservation Foundation welcomed crucial measures that helped the climate.
