= Karen Middleton (journalist) =

Australian journalist

Karen Middleton, also known as Kate Middleton, is an Australian political journalist in the Canberra Press Gallery covering the Parliament of Australia in Canberra, the national capital of Australia. Until March 2025, Middleton was Political Editor of Guardian Australia.

== Career ==
Middleton was Chief Political Correspondent and Canberra Bureau Chief for SBS Television.

She was a seasoned radio and TV commentator, had a weekly radio spot on James O'Loghlin's Evening Show on ABC Radio across New South Wales and the Australian Capital Territory, and on Perth radio 6PR, Sydney radio 2GB and ABC Radio National, and TV appearances on Sunrise on the Seven Network, Meet the Press on the Ten Network, and ABC TV's Insiders. She is a fortnightly commentator on Radio New Zealand and has done commentary and analysis for CNBC and al Jazeera.

Middleton was a political correspondent for several newspapers, such as The West Australian, the Melbourne Age and Herald Sun, as a weekend columnist for the Canberra Times, and as an occasional contributor to The New York Times. In 2016, Middleton gained the position of Chief Political Correspondent for The Saturday Paper.

In October 2016, Middleton wrote about her experiences of being sexually harassed while covering Australian politics as a journalist. Later she described the strong response she had received for this article, and about how some who had read it described it as "jawdropping" or "deeply unsettling".

In 2024, Middleton left her position at The Saturday Paper to become Guardian Australia's Political Editor. However, from late 2024, Middleton went on extended leave. In March 2025, Middleton announced her departure from the role, but revealed her intention to continue with political journalism.

=== Notable professional achievements ===
2011 Middleton reported for SBS from Afghanistan in August and published a book through Melbourne University Press on Australia's involvement in the War in Afghanistan, titled 'An Unwinnable War' in September.

2008 Middleton was awarded a Churchill Fellowship.

==== Afghanistan, March 2007 ====
While on assignment in Afghanistan in March 2007, Middleton and other Australian journalists were travelling in an Australian Army CH-47 Chinook helicopter that was fired on with at least one rocket propelled grenade. Middleton's SBS colleague, cameraman Jamie Kidston, was at the rear ramp of the helicopter and filmed the RPG pass the back of the Chinook. He only saw the missile pass when reviewing and editing the tape. The story made national news on several TV and radio networks, and in newspapers.

This visit was neatly timed to coincide with an un-announced visit by Prime Minister John Howard and Chief of the Australian Defence Force, Air Chief Marshal Angus Houston, to meet Australian troops. Howard also met the President, Hamid Karzai.

==== Copenhagen, 2009 ====
Middleton reported and blogged for SBS on the 2009 United Nations Climate Change Conference in Copenhagen, Denmark, notably reporting from a "press room" in a shipping container in a snowy car park.

== Personal life ==
Born in Ottawa, Ontario, Canada to Australian parents, Middleton grew up in Canberra, attending Belconnen High School and Hawker College.

She has regularly volunteered to assist refugee families relocate to Australia.

Middleton's grandfather was Sir Crawford Nalder, who served as deputy premier of Western Australia from 1962 to 1971.

== Publications ==
- An Unwinnable War: Australia in Afghanistan, 2011 (Note: The original title was The... and there are numerous references to "The Unwinnable War".)
