= Jim Chalmers =

Australian politician (born 1978)

The Honourable Jim Chalmers MP
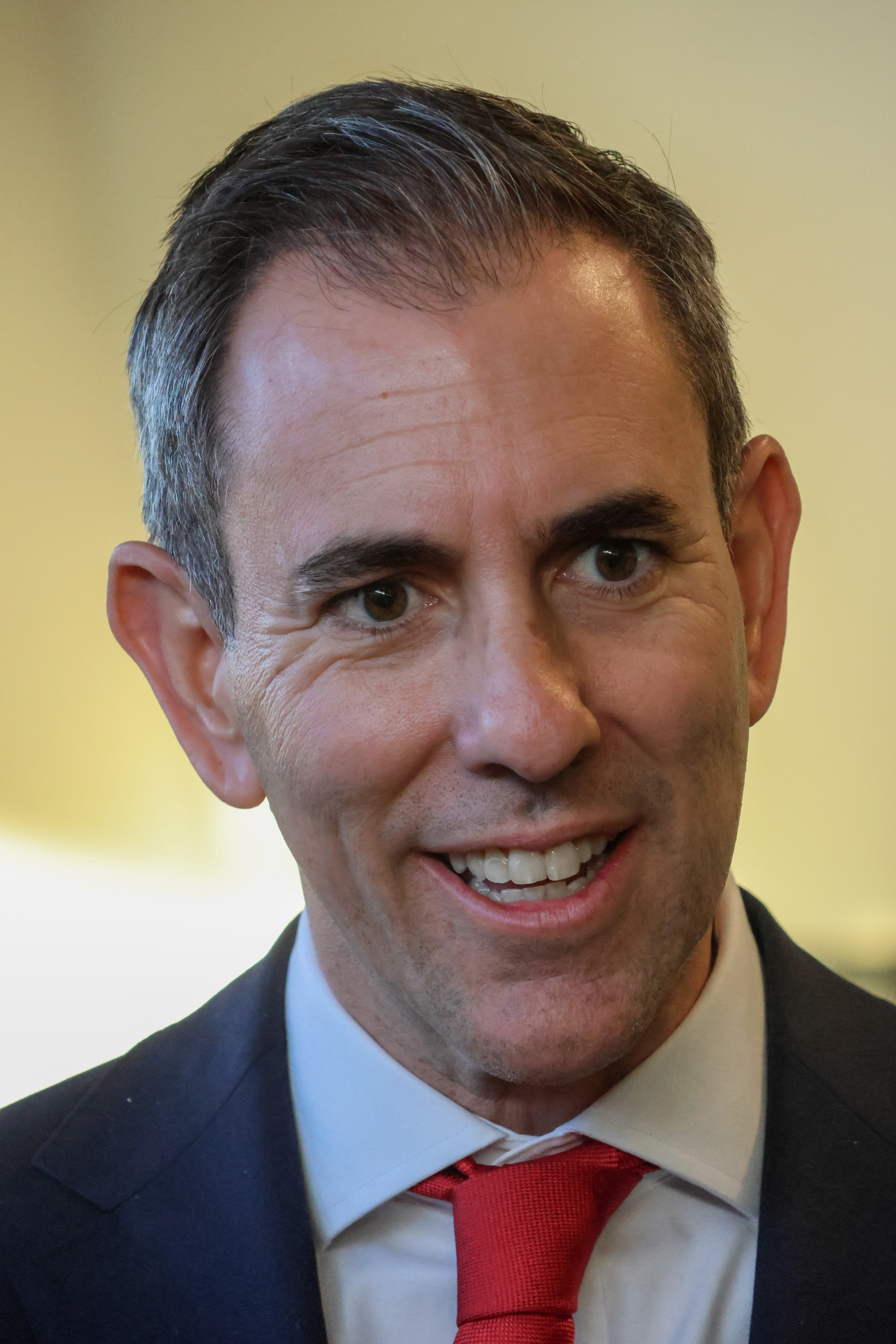
- Chalmers in 2026

Treasurer of Australia
- Incumbent
- Assumed office 23 May 2022
- Prime Minister: Anthony Albanese
- Preceded by: Josh Frydenberg

Member of the Australian Parliament for Rankin
- Incumbent
- Assumed office 7 September 2013
- Preceded by: Craig Emerson

Personal details
- Born: James Edward Chalmers; 2 March 1978 (age 48) Brisbane, Queensland, Australia
- Party: Labor
- Spouse: Laura Anderson (m. 2013)
- Children: 3
- Education: Griffith University (BA, BComm); Australian National University (PhD)
- Website: Government website Personal website Party website

James Edward Chalmers (born 2 March 1978) is an Australian politician who has served as the treasurer in the Albanese government since 2022. A member of the Labor Party, he has been the member of Parliament (MP) for the Queensland division of Rankin since 2013.

Born in Brisbane, Chalmers graduated from Griffith University in 1999 with a Bachelor of Arts and a Bachelor of Commerce, and later from the Australian National University in 2004 with a doctorate in political science. He worked as a research officer and manager for the Queensland government and the national Labor Party from 1999 to 2001, and 2002 to 2004 respectively, and held senior advisory positions in the staffs of Wayne Swan, Kim Beazley, and Morris Iemma from 2005 to 2007. He was elected to the House of Representatives at the 2013 federal election, winning the southeast Brisbane seat of Rankin. He was appointed to the shadow ministry by Bill Shorten in 2013, becoming a frontbencher in 2015, and later to the shadow ministry of Anthony Albanese after Shorten's retirement. Chalmers became the treasurer after the Labor Party's victory at the 2022 election.

== Early life and education ==
Chalmers was born on 2 March 1978 in Brisbane, the youngest of three children born to Graham and Carol Chalmers. His father worked as a courier and his mother worked as a nurse. They divorced when he was 14, by which time his older sisters had left home.

Chalmers was raised in Logan City in Brisbane's south. He attended Catholic schools before going on to Griffith University, where he completed the degrees of Bachelor of Arts and Bachelor of Commerce and attained a First Class honours degree in public policy. He went on to complete a PhD in political science at the Australian National University, writing his doctoral thesis on the prime ministership of Paul Keating, titled "Brawler statesman: Paul Keating and prime ministerial leadership in Australia".

== Early political involvement ==
From 1999 to 2001, Chalmers worked as a research officer in the Queensland Department of Premier and Cabinet. He was the ALP's national research manager from 2002 to 2004, media adviser to Shadow Treasurer Wayne Swan from 2005 to 2006, deputy chief of staff to Opposition Leader Kim Beazley in 2006, and a senior adviser to New South Wales premier Morris Iemma from 2006 to 2007. After Labor won the 2007 federal election, Chalmers returned to work for Wayne Swan, as deputy chief of staff and principal adviser (2007–2010) and then as chief of staff (2010–2013). He briefly served as the executive director of the Chifley Research Centre in 2013. In the same year he published Glory Daze, a book about the disconnect between Australia's strong economic performance and popular discontent with government.

== Member of Parliament ==
=== Opposition (2013–2022) ===
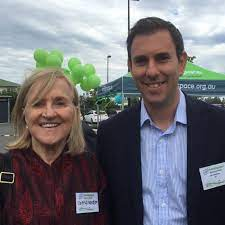
Chalmers in 2016

Chalmers was elected to parliament at the 2013 federal election, replacing the retiring ALP member Craig Emerson in the Division of Rankin. He defeated former MP Brett Raguse for Labor preselection. Chalmers was made a shadow parliamentary secretary in October 2013, a shadow minister in October 2015, and promoted to the shadow cabinet after the 2016 election as Shadow Minister for Finance.

After the 2019 federal election, Chalmers publicly considered running to succeed Bill Shorten as party leader and Leader of the Opposition. His relative youth and status as a Queenslander were seen as potential assets, as well as his membership of the Labor Right faction. However, some within his faction had already chosen to support the Labor Left candidate Anthony Albanese. Chalmers eventually chose not to stand for the position, allowing Albanese to become leader unopposed. He subsequently also ruled out standing for the deputy leadership. He was subsequently appointed Shadow Treasurer in Albanese's cabinet.

=== Albanese government (2022–present) ===
Labor was victorious in the 2022 federal election, and two days later, Albanese had himself, Chalmers and three other senior Labor frontbenchers sworn in as an interim five-person government, with Chalmers becoming the Treasurer of Australia. He was also the interim Minister for Home Affairs until the full ministry was sworn in after the Quadrilateral Security Dialogue. In October 2022, Chalmers handed down his first budget.

In May 2023, Chalmers handed down his second budget. After being initially predicted to deliver a surplus of over $4 billion, the budget ended up significantly exceeding expectations by delivering a surplus of $22.1 billion (equivalent to 0.9% of Australia's GDP); this was Australia's first budget surplus in 15 years, and the largest ever Australian budget surplus. In January 2024, Chalmers played a key role in championing the Albanese government's changes to the stage three tax cuts. Chalmers handed down his third budget in May 2024, which saw the government post a second consecutive surplus of $9.3 billion. He handed down the 2025 budget, which saw the budget return to a $42.1 billion deficit. The budget included a further $17 billion in personal income tax cuts for the lowest earners. During the 2025 federal election campaign, Chalmers participated in several debates with shadow treasurer Angus Taylor.

In 2026, Chalmers handed down the 2026 Australian federal budget.

== Political positions ==
Chalmers is a member of the Labor Right faction. In 2016 he co-founded the Courtyard Group, a roundtable linking Labor MPs with "Australia's leading progressive thinkers from business, academia, media, and consumer advocacy bodies".

According to political scientist Carol Johnson, Chalmers' 2013 book Glory Daze "defined Labor as standing for intergenerational mobility, aspiration and the Fair Go, while emphasising the importance of sound economic management". His 2017 book Changing Jobs: The fair go in the new machine age, co-authored with telecommunications executive Mike Quigley, argued that future governments should consider a robot tax to reduce the impact of technological unemployment. He has also expressed positive views on the concept of a universal basic income. In the lead-up to the 2022 election, Chalmers stated that an ALP government would not increase taxes other than on multinational corporations. He also rejected new taxes. His campaigning focused on cost of living issues but also emphasised the need to work co-operatively with business.

In a long-form essay published in The Monthly in 2023, Chalmers argued for more active involvement by the government in capital markets to collaborate with enterprises that suit the government's social and environmental priorities, describing it as "values-based capitalism".

== Electoral history ==
House of Representatives
Year	Electorate	Party	First preference result				Two candidate result			
Year	Electorate	Party	Votes	%	±%	Position	Votes	%	±%	Result
2013	Rankin	Labor	35,098	42.18	▼2.97	First	45,580	54.78	▼0.63	Elected
2016	Rankin	Labor	42,147	49.34	▲7.16	First	52,362	61.30	▲6.52	Elected
2019	Rankin	Labor	35,156	41.43	▼7.91	First	47,893	56.44	▼4.86	Elected
2022	Rankin	Labor	38,596	43.95	▲2.52	First	51,892	59.09	▲2.65	Elected
2025	Rankin	Labor	45,303	49.42	▲5.47	First	60,092	65.55	▲6.46	Elected

== Personal life ==
In March 2013, Chalmers married Laura Anderson, a journalist and writer who worked as a staffer to Penny Wong and Julia Gillard. The couple have three children. Their wedding, attended by Gillard and Wayne Swan among others, occurred two days after an ALP leadership spill. While in attendance Gillard "convened a council of war in a specially set-aside room to frame a new ministry".

Chalmers identifies as a Catholic, though more "tribal than Bible", his three children having been baptised in the same church as himself. His interests have been listed to include running, rugby league and basketball. He is a fan of hip-hop music, with some of his favourite artists including Tupac Shakur, The Notorious B.I.G. and Nas.

In the National Rugby League Chalmers supports the Brisbane Broncos.

== Publications ==
- Chalmers, Jim (2004). Brawler statesman: Paul Keating and prime ministerial leadership in Australia (PhD thesis). Canberra: Australian National University. doi:10.25911/5d78d7aebdf5c.
- ——————— (2013). Glory Daze: How a world-beating nation got so down on itself. Melbourne: Melbourne University Press. ISBN 978-0-522-86413-7.
- ———————; Quigley, Mike (2017). Changing Jobs, The Fair go in the New Machine Age. Melbourne: Redback Quarterly. ISBN 978-1-86395-944-5.

Parliament of Australia
Preceded by Craig Emerson	Member for Rankin; 2013–present	Incumbent
Political offices
Preceded by Josh Frydenberg	Treasurer of Australia; 2022–present	Incumbent
