= Capital Brief =

Australian news website

- Available in: English
- Headquarters: Sydney, Australia
- Owner: Scire
- Editor: John McDuling
- CEO: Chris Janz
- Website: www.capitalbrief.com
- Commercial: Yes
- Registration: Optional
- Launched: August 23, 2023; 3 years ago
- Current status: Active

Capital Brief is an Australian news website that primarily covers business and politics. It was launched in August 2023 and is aimed at founders, executives, investors, politicians and policymakers.

The editor-in-chief is John McDuling, the former national business editor of The Sydney Morning Herald and The Age.

Journalists are based in Sydney, Melbourne and Canberra. They include chief political correspondent Matthew Franklin, VC and startups correspondent Bronwen Clune, legal correspondent Michael Pelly, and markets and finance correspondent Jack Derwin.

Its main newsletter, The Edition, is published at 4.30pm weekdays. Its politics and policy newsletter Political Capital, led by Matthew Franklin, expanded to five days a week in June 2026. Specialist newsletters Capital Gains (banking and finance), Prima Facie (legal affairs), and Sweat Equity (VC and startups) are published weekly.

The company also produces the daily M&A, equity capital markets and VC deals newsletter Letter of Intent, which was acquired in 2023 for an undisclosed sum.

Its business model is subscription based and unlike many Australian media companies, it does not collect personal data for advertisement targeting. Its "reader-revenue-first and journalism-first" approach is modelled on the US websites The Information, Axios and Semafor.

The publication includes breaking news provided by national newswire Australian Associated Press in a "briefings" format that is unique to the publication.

It is the first publication from Scire, a start-up launched by former Fairfax Media executives Chris Janz and David Eisman. The venture was confirmed in March 2023 after months of speculation in Australian media. Janz was previously publisher of The Sydney Morning Herald, The Age and The Australian Financial Review and led the initiatives that prevented The Age and Herald from discontinuing their print editions.

Scire is backed by Sydney venture capital firm Shearwater Capital.

== Notable contributors ==
- Anthony Albanese
- Allegra Spender
- Robin Khuda
- Nicolette Boele
- Andrew Bragg
- Anthony Liveris
- Flavia Tata Nardini
