= Tim Blair =

Australian journalist

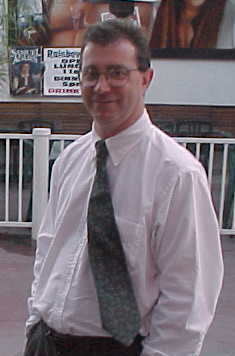
Blair in 1999

Tim Blair (born 1965) is an Australian editor, journalist, political commentator, and blogger. He works for The Daily Telegraph in Sydney.

In mid-2001, Blair began blogging on Blogspot. By 2004, he had attracted a significant following, with The Sydney Morning Herald describing him as a "top dog among the new Australian digerati" who "some days draws more than 20,000 readers to his website." In addition to running his blog, Blair previously served as a news editor and regular columnist for the now-defunct magazine The Bulletin. He also worked as a journalist and senior editor at Time, Truth, and Sports Illustrated, and has written for Fox News. Since May 2017, he has contributed a monthly column titled "Sweetness & Light" to Quadrant. Additionally, Blair has appeared on 4BC, Radio National, and the ABC programme Insiders.
