= Dennis Shanahan =

Newspaper editor in Australia

- Occupation: Newspaper editor
- Known for: criticised for telling readers that John Howard would win the 2007, which he lost in a landslide
- Notable work: political editor of The Australian
- Children: Brendan Shanahan (author)

Dennis Shanahan is a political editor of The Australian, a newspaper in Australia.

Shanahan has been a journalist at major newspapers for "almost forty years". He covered NSW politics for the Sydney Morning Herald in the 1980s before joining The Australian. He led the paper's Canberra Bureau for 10 years before becoming the paper's political editor, a position he has held for 11 years.

He is the father of Australian author and columnist Brendan Shanahan.

In 2007, he was criticised by continuing to believe and tell readers that John Howard would win the election. Howard was beaten by a landslide including his own seat of Bennelong.
