= Mark Kenny =

Australian journalist

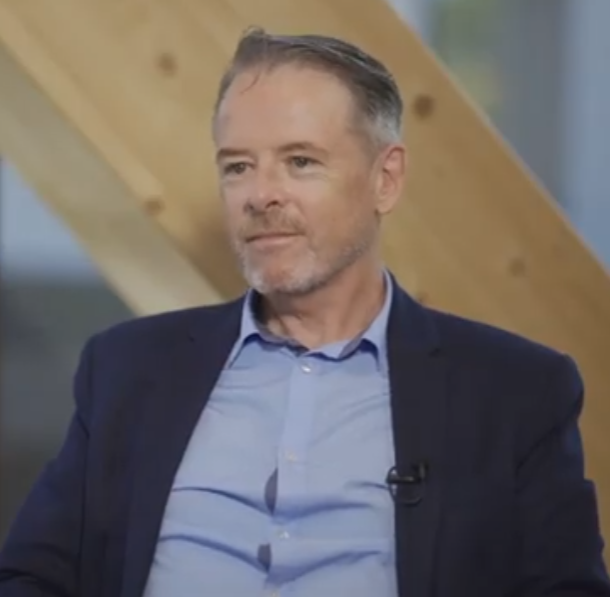
- In an ANU video in 2019
- Occupations: Journalist, academic
- Employer: Australian National University

Mark Kenny is an Australian journalist. He was the national affairs editor for The Age and the Sydney Morning Herald, and is now a Professor at the Australian Studies Institute at the Australian National University.

== Career and personal life ==
Kenny is a correspondent for Fairfax Media, and formerly worked for ABC, for the Advertiser as the national political editor, and was the national affairs editor for The Age and the Sydney Morning Herald. He is director of Canberra's National Press Club, and regular commentator on the ABC TV Insiders program. Kenny is the cousin of political commentator and Sky News Live presenter Chris Kenny.

While working as a senior political correspondent, Kenny has covered bilateral talks inside the White House, 10 Downing Street, Beijing's Great Hall of the People, the German Chancellery (Bundeskanzleramt), the Japanese Prime Minister's Residence (The Kantei), The Vatican, and many others. He has also covered summits including annual APEC and G20 meetings, G8, ASEAN and East Asia Summit, NATO, and the Copenhagen climate talks in 2009.

In December 2018, it was announced that Kenny was taking up a position of senior fellow at the Australian Studies Institute at the Australian National University on the strength of his media output. Kenny was promoted to Professor in February 2020.

His recent publications include the chapter, "Coarse and Effect: Normalised anger online as an essential precondition to violence" in the ANU Press book Rethinking Social Media and Extremism.

Kenny currently hosts the podcast Democracy Sausage with Mark Kenny.

== Political views ==
Kenny is a republican, who describes CHOGM meetings as "quaint". He advocated for marriage equality.

== Research interests ==
Kenny's research interests include national politics, comparative studies, democracy, and the rise of populism.
