= Cathy Wilcox =

Australian cartoonist (born 1963)

- Born: Catherine Morville Wilcox; 1963 (age 62–63); Sydney, New South Wales, Australia
- Known for: Cartoons
- Notable work: A Proper Little Lady
- Awards: Walkley Award for Excellence in Journalism – Cartooning, 2007, 2013, 2017/Stanley Award for Best Editorial/Political Cartoonist and Best Single Gag Artist in 1994 and for Best Single Gag Artist in 1997, 2014, 2015 / Australian Book Council of Australia Award. Cartoonist of the Year in 2009, 2016, 2020 / Museum of Australian Democracy.
- Website: www.cathywilcox.com.au

External videos
- Cathy Wilcox: MoAD's 2020 Political Cartoonist of the Yea, 2020.
- Lazy and Outraged? Don’t Take It Personally, Cathy Wilcox, TEDxSydney, 2016
- Meet The Speakers: Cathy Wilcox, TEDxSydney, 25 May 2016

Cathy Wilcox (born 1963) is an Australian cartoonist and children's book illustrator, best known for her work as a cartoonist for The Sydney Morning Herald and The Age newspapers. Wilcox left The Sydney Morning Herald and The Age in August 2026.

== Awards ==
She has also twice won the Australian Children's Book Council's 'Picture Book of the Year' award. In 2007 she won the Walkley Award in Cartooning for a cartoon about Sheikh Taj el-Din al Hilaly's infamous 'uncovered meat' remarks on Australian women. She went on to win a second Walkley Award in Cartoon for 'Kevin Cleans Up' and a third in 2017 for 'Low-cost Housing, London' which is a reference to the Grenfell Tower fire in North Kensington, London.

Wilcox won her first Australian Cartoonist Association Stanley Award for Best Editorial/Political Cartoonist and Best Single Gag Artist for her work in The Sydney Morning Herald in 1994. Since then, she has received a Stanley Award for Single Gag Cartoonist in 1997, 2014 and 2015 and was a finalist in 2018.

Wilcox was named Cartoonist of the Year in 2009, 2016 and 2020 by the Museum of Australian Democracy.

== Royal Commission cartoon ==
In January 2026, The Sydney Morning Herald and The Age published a Wilcox cartoon about the campaign for a Royal Commission on Antisemitism and Social Cohesion. On 11 January, The Sydney Morning Herald and The Age published an apology for the cartoon, which, it said, many of its readers found thought-provoking but many others, particularly Jews, found deeply hurtful and offensive.

== Selected publications ==
- Wilcox, Cathy (1991). Throw away lines : cartoons by Cathy Wilcox; with an introduction by Patrick Cook. North Ryde, N.S.W.: Collins/Angus & Robertson.
- Wilcox, Cathy (1993). Enzo the Wonderfish. North Ryde, N.S.W.: Angus & Robertson. ISBN 0207176507.
- Wilcox, Cathy (2005). The Bad Guys Are Winning: Cartoons by Cathy Wilcox; foreword by James Valentine. Australia: Lothian Books. ISBN 9780734408235.
- Saclier, Krys (2020). Vote 4 Me. Illustrated by Cathy Wilcox. Wild Dog Books. ISBN 9781742035956.
- Wilcox, Cathy; Macdonald, Sarah (4 February 2020). So ... You're Having a Teenager: An A-Z of adolescence from argumentative to zits. Allen & Unwin. ISBN 978-1-76087-349-3.
