= Glenn Milne =

Glenn Milne (born 1954) is a Canberra journalist and political commentator. He worked for News Limited as a columnist for The Australian newspaper and as a writer for the Australian Broadcasting Corporation. He is a former chief political correspondent for the Seven Network where he reported for Seven News and often conducted interviews on Sunday Sunrise. He has also been political editor of The Australian.

He is a former Vice President of the National Press Club in Canberra.

In 1997 Milne won a Walkley award in the "Television News Reporting" category, for his reporting on the 1997 Thredbo landslide.

== Controversies ==
Milne was involved in a scuffle onstage with Crikey founder Stephen Mayne at the 2006 Walkley Awards, where an intoxicated Milne verbally abused Mayne and pushed him off a stage, before being restrained and removed by security staff. Milne later released a statement apologising for his actions, and claimed that his behaviour was caused by a combination of alcohol and migraine medication.

In August 2011 The Australian removed a story by Milne from its website that falsely claimed that then-Prime Minister Julia Gillard was unknowingly implicated in a "major union fraud" during her time as a lawyer, and failed to contact her at any point or provide Gillard her right of reply.
