= Stage three tax cuts =

Policy by the Australian Government

The stage three tax cuts are a taxation policy overseen by the Australian Government, that came into effect on 1 July 2024. Originally forming the third and last stage of the Turnbull government's personal income tax reforms, stage three was altered in the Morrison government's 2019 budget to include an additional $90 billion of tax cuts.

Stage three has been the subject of significant political discussion and controversy in Australian politics, and has been used as a wedge issue. During the 2022 Australian federal election campaign, the Coalition and Australian Labor Party both stated their full support for retaining stage three, whereas the Australian Greens and several independent MPs argued for its modification or abolition. In January 2024, the Albanese government announced modifications to stage three that reduced the overall cost and gave larger cuts to individuals earning under $200,000.

== Timeline ==
=== 2018 ===
The original suite of tax cuts were legislated by the Turnbull government as the Treasury Laws Amendment (Personal Income Tax Plan) Bill 2018. Stage three was set to take place on 1 July 2024.

All three stages were part of the same legislation, with Treasurer Scott Morrison stating this was done to provide "certainty".

Following amendments, the final legislation passed the House of Representatives with the support of the Coalition, Bob Katter and independent MP Julia Banks. The bill was opposed by Labor, the Greens and two independents; Cathy McGowan and Andrew Wilkie.

== 2019 ==
In the lead-up to the 2019 federal election, Labor made a number of criticisms of stage three. Shadow treasurer Chris Bowen stated in April 2019 that it was "neither fair nor responsible to lock in billions of dollars of tax giveaways that disproportionately benefit a relative few - and so far into the future”. Shadow finance minister Jim Chalmers stated that "the last stage of tax cuts can only be funded by budget cuts".

Following the Morrison government's victory at the federal election on 18 May, treasurer Josh Frydenberg handed down his budget. In it, the stage three tax cuts were modified to cut taxes by a further A$90 billion. This change brought the total cost of stage three to A$254 billion over the 2024-2034 period.

The legislation was passed on 4 July 2019, and was entitled "Treasury Laws Amendment (Tax Relief so Working Australians Keep More of Their Money)". Opposition leader Anthony Albanese unsuccessfully proposed amending the name of the bill to "Treasury Laws Amendment (Tax Relief So Working Australians Keep More of Their Money But Not For a Really Long Time)."

Labor voted for the A$158 billion dollar tax plan in both chambers of parliament, but leader Anthony Albanese stated that they had done so as not to block the earlier stages from benefiting "working Australians". In the Senate, the legislation was supported by the Coalition, Labor, Jacqui Lambie and the Centre Alliance, and was opposed by the Greens. Labor unsuccessfully proposed amending the legislation to delay stage three and bring stage two of the tax cuts forward.

=== 2020 ===
In September 2020, The Australia Institute published a report stating that the majority of the stage two and three cuts would benefit the top 10% of earners.

=== 2021 ===
In July 2021, the Labor party held a party room meeting where they decided that if they formed government, they would retain stage three.

=== 2022 ===
After becoming prime minister, Anthony Albanese ruled out altering or abolishing stage three.

In August 2022, federal crossbenchers voiced their opposition to stage three. David Pocock, Jacqui Lambie, Dai Le, Monique Ryan, Bob Katter and Andrew Wilkie stated that stage three should be abandoned, and Rebekha Sharkie stated that the timing of stage three "should be reconsidered". Pauline Hanson stated her support for stage three being implemented.

In the same month, the Parliamentary Budget Office released a report, commissioned by the Australian Greens. The report stated that stage three would provide around twice as much benefit to men as to women, and that 48% of the benefits of stage three would go to those earning above A$180,000.

In October 2022, former prime minister Malcolm Turnbull stated that he did not believe the cuts should be implemented, due to their cost, and that Labor had made a mistake by committing to implement them at the 2022 federal election.

=== 2023 ===
Independent members of the Australian Parliament advocated for restructuring of stage three, including Dai Le, David Pocock and Monique Ryan.

=== 2024 ===
In January, the Albanese government announced changes to the stage three tax cuts. The changes mean that individuals earning between A$45,000 to A$150,000 (the median taxpayer earning around A$59,000 in FY2024-25) will pay A$804 less tax compared to the previous stage three plan. For those earning over A$200,000, the cut is reduced by half.

== Details ==
=== Stages one and two ===
Stage one (Schedule 1 of Treasury Laws Amendment (Personal Income Tax Plan) Bill 2018) is the Low and Middle Income Tax Offset (LMITO, nicknamed the "lamington"), along with some changes to the Low Income Tax Offset (see Income tax in Australia - Low income tax offset). The LMITO is a separate and temporary tax rebate introduced by the Morrison government in July 2019 and is available for the 2018–19, 2019–20, 2020–21 and 2021–22 income years only. The maximum amount of LMITO is $1,080, it cannot reduce tax liability below zero dollars, and the offset cuts out when taxable income reaches $126,000. The LMITO does not reduce the Medicare levy. Further changes in 2019 increased the LMITO from the 2018 legislation.

Taxable income	Low and middle income tax offset (until 2021–22)
$18,200 – $37,000	$255
$37,001 – $48,000	$255 plus 7.5c for every $1 above $37,000, up to a maximum of $1,080
$48,001 – $90,000	$1,080
$90,001 – $126,000	$1,080 minus 3c for every $1 above $90,000
$126,001 and over	$0

Stage two (part of Schedule 2) involves lifting the thresholds for the 19% and 32.5% marginal tax brackets. As initially legislated, the upper threshold for the 32.5% bracket would rise from A$87,000 to A$90,000 in 2018, and to A$120,000 in 2022, while the upper threshold for the 19% bracket would rise from A$37,000 to A$41,000 in 2022. Further changes in 2019 increased the upper threshold of the 19% bracket further to $A45,000, and brought the remaining stage two changes forward to 2020.

Before stage two (FY2017-18)		Planned Turnbull Govt. stage two (FY2018-19, 2019-20, 2020-21, 2021-22)		Planned Turnbull Govt Stage two (FY 2022-23, 2023-24)		Actual Morrison Govt stage two (FY2020-21, 2021-22, 2022-23, 2023-24)	
Taxable income	Marginal tax rate	Taxable income	Marginal tax rate	Taxable income	Marginal tax rate	Taxable income	Marginal tax rate
$1 – $18,200	0%	$1 – $18,200	0%	$1 – $18,200	0%	$1 – $18,200	0%
$18,201 – $37,000	19%	$18,201 – $37,000	19%	$18,201 – $41,000	19%	$18,201 – $45,000	19%
$37,001 – $87,000	32.5%	$37,001 – $90,000	32.5%	$41,001 – $120,000	32.5%	$45,001 – $120,000	32.5%
$87,001 – $180,000	37%	$90,001 – $180,000	37%	$120,001 – $180,000	37%	$120,001 – $180,000	37%
$180,001 and over	45%	$180,001 and over	45%	$180,001 and over	45%	$180,001 and over	45%

Tax rates are as listed for Australian residents.

=== Stage three ===
The stage three tax cuts (part of Schedule 2), as initially legislated (not including temporary stage one changes, and stage two changes) would have kept the lowest two brackets the same (A$1-$18,200, and A$18,201-$45,000), but would have merged the next two brackets to create a bracket from A$45,001 to A$200,000 that would have been taxed at a lower marginal rate of 30%. The threshold for the top tax bracket would have been increased from A$180,001 to A$200,001.

The revised stage three tax cuts from the Albanese Government keeps all five tax brackets. The tax rate for the second lowest bracket (A$18,201-$45,000) will be reduced from 19% to 16%, while the third lowest bracket will cover incomes from A$45,001 to A$135,000 (A$45,001 to A$120,000 before stage three) and be taxed at a rate of 30%. The two highest brackets will be taxed at their current marginal rates, but will have higher thresholds, only applying for incomes above A$135,001 and A$190,001, compared to A$120,001 and A$180,001 before stage three.

Pre stage three (FY2023-24)		Morrison stage three tax cuts		Revised Albanese stage three tax cuts	
Taxable income	Marginal tax rate	Taxable income	Marginal tax rate	Taxable income	Marginal tax rate
$1 – $18,200	0%	$1 – $18,200	0%	$1 – $18,200	0%
$18,201 – $45,000	19%	$18,201 – $45,000	19%	$18,201 – $45,000	16%
$45,001 – $120,000	32.5%	$45,001 – $200,000	30%	$45,001 – $135,000	30%
$120,001 – $180,000	37%	$45,001 – $200,000	30%	$135,001 – $190,000	37%
$180,001 and over	45%	$200,001 and over	45%	$190,001 and over	45%

Tax rates are as listed for Australian residents.

== Response to changes ==
=== Coalition ===
The Coalition has accused Albanese and the government of lying and breaking an election promise by changing aspects of stage three. Deputy Liberal leader Sussan Ley stated that Labor "lied about these tax cuts", and shadow Treasurer Angus Taylor stated that the decision was "the mother of all broken promises”.

Initially, several figures in the Coalition suggested that they would oppose the government's changes. On 23 January, Taylor stated that the Coalition would "absolutely not" support any changes to the tax cuts. On 25 January, Ley stated that the Coalition's position was to "support the existing stage three arrangements", and opposition leader Peter Dutton stated that the changes were significant enough that the government should hold an election to get a mandate for them. On 26 January, Dutton stated that the Coalition was wanting to "understand the costings" before making a decision about supporting the changes.

On 6 February 2024, the Coalition announced that they would support the government's amended legislation in Parliament. The legislation passed through the House of Representatives on 15 February, and passed through the Senate in an evening sitting of 27 February.

=== Greens ===
Greens leader Adam Bandt stated on 26 January 2024 that the changes to stage three were not sufficient for assisting low- and middle-income earners.

== Public opinion ==
A poll conducted by The Australia Institute in September 2022 found that 41 percent of respondents supported a repeal of the stage three tax cuts, while 22 percent were opposed. Another poll by the Australia Institute in October 2023 found that in a cohort of voters informed of the cost to the budget and who benefitted from the tax cuts, 25% of respondents supported repealing the tax cuts, and 44% stated they should be restructured. 17% were in favour of retaining stage three in an unchanged form.

After the Albanese government announced changes to the tax cuts in January 2024, a poll by Newspoll found that 62 percent of those surveyed were supportive of the changes.

Polling by the Australia Institute in the Division of Dunkley in the lead-up to the 2024 Dunkley by-election found that 66% of residents surveyed supported the government's changes to stage three.

The Australian Industry Group called for a reduction in the next minimum wage increase due to the redesign of the stage three tax cuts, arguing that workers would receive 2% more money, adding to inflationary pressures. The Fair Work Commission previously decided in 2019 that it would not be appropriate to directly reduce the minimum wage increase that year from the Low and Middle Income Tax Offset.
