= Peter Hartcher =

Australian journalist (born 1963)

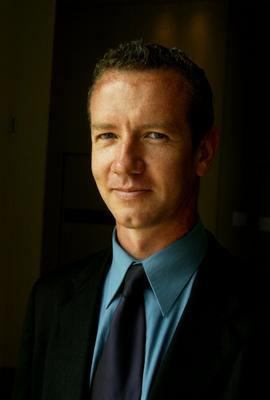
- Born: 9 August 1963 (age 63); Sydney
- Occupations: Journalist, author, columnist

Peter Hartcher is an Australian journalist and the Political and International Editor of The Sydney Morning Herald. He is also a visiting fellow at the Lowy Institute, a Sydney-based foreign policy think tank.

== Career ==
In 1981, while a student at Chevalier College in Burradoo, New South Wales, Hartcher was national winner of The Sydney Morning Herald's Plain English Speaking competition and won a trip to England, where he won the international final the following year.

His career in journalism began the following year with a cadetship at the Herald. In 1986 he took up his first overseas posting as the newspaper's Tokyo correspondent.

On his return to Australia in 1988, Hartcher was made chief political correspondent, a position he held until 1991, when he accepted a job with the Australian Financial Review as Tokyo correspondent.

Between 1995 and 2000 he was the Australian Financial Review's Asia-Pacific editor. His 1996 investigative series uncovering the secret negotiation of a security treaty between Australia and Indonesia won the Australian journalism award, the Gold Walkley. He then went to the US for three years, where he was the Washington DC correspondent. In 1998 he was the recipient of the Citibank Award for Excellence in Journalism. In 2004 Hartcher rejoined The Sydney Morning Herald in his current capacity.

In late 2012 and early 2013 Hartcher wrote several columns covering Prime Minister Julia Gillard's ailing leadership and the potential return to leadership of the former prime minister, Kevin Rudd.

== Books ==
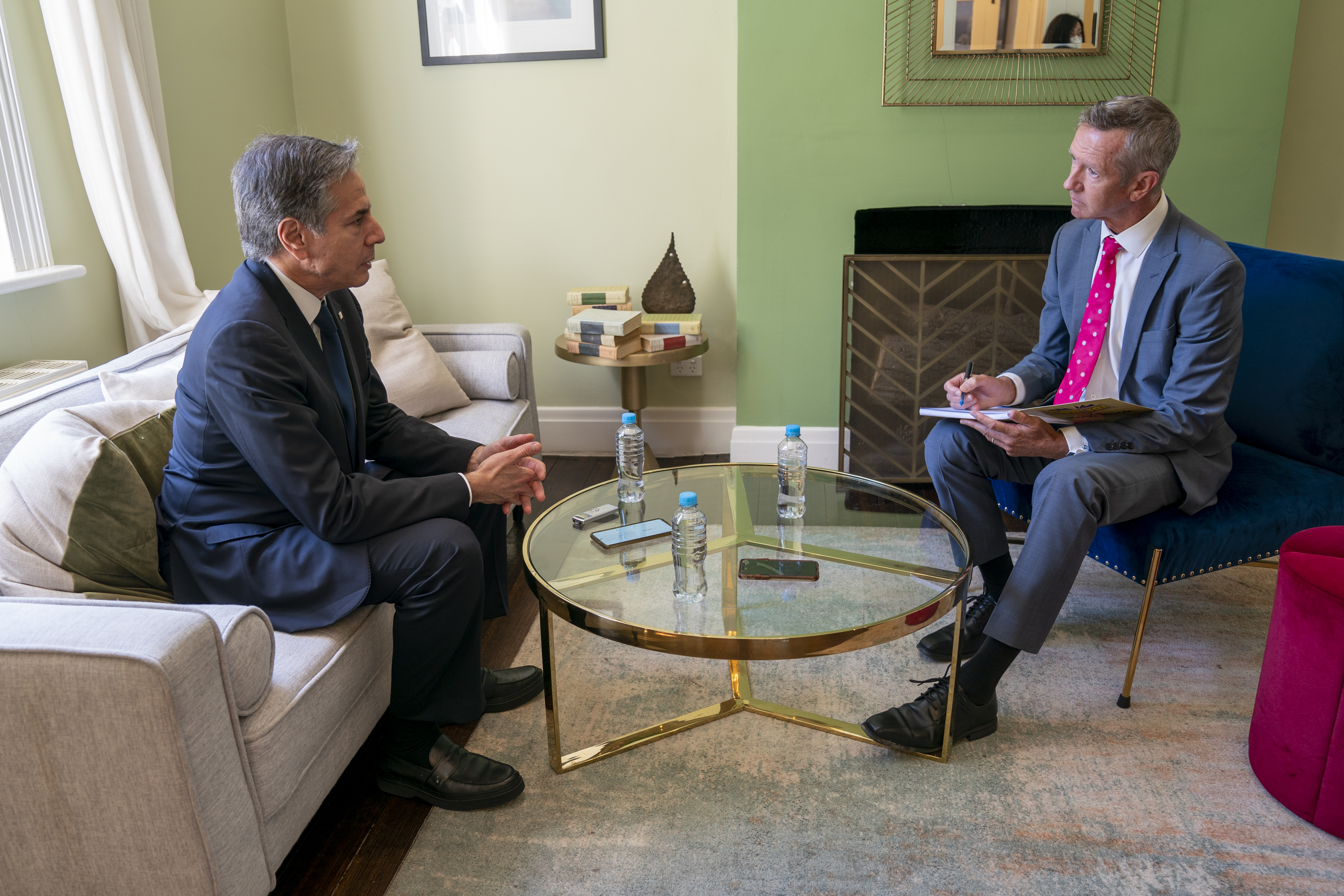
US secretary of State, Antony Blinken, interviewed by Peter Hartcher, February 2022

In 1998 Hartcher published his first book, The Ministry (ISBN 978-0875847856), an exposé of the role played by Japan's Ministry of Finance in that country's economic collapse and subsequent stagnation.

Bubble Man: Alan Greenspan and the Missing 7 Trillion Dollars (ISBN 978-0393062250), Hartcher's critique of Greenspan's and the Federal Reserve Board's management of the US economy through the years of irrational exuberance, was published in 2004 to a mixed reception in the US, but was met with greater critical enthusiasm internationally.

In 2007 Hartcher wrote Bipolar Nation: How to Win the 2007 Election in Black Inc's Quarterly Essay (ISBN 9781863954013), an analysis of the Australian electorate's collective psyche and what he argues is its peculiar susceptibility to manipulation.

In 2009 Hartcher published To The Bitter End: The Dramatic Story of the Fall of John Howard and the Rise of Kevin Rudd (Crows Nest, NSW:Allen & Unwin. ISBN 978-1-74175-623-4).

In 2011 Hartcher published The Sweet Spot: How Australia Made Its Own Luck – And Could Now Throw It All Away (Black Inc. ISBN 978-1-86395-497-6), for which in 2013 he was awarded the 2013 Ashurst Business Literature Prize.

Hartcher's second Quarterly Essay, "Red Flag: Waking Up to China's Challenge", was published in 2019.

His 2021 book Red Zone: China's Challenge and Australia's Future was longlisted for that year's Walkley Book Award.
