= The Australian =

Daily newspaper in Australia

- "Welcome to the Contest of Ideas"
- Front cover of The Australian, 26 July 2017
- Type: Newspaper
- Format: Broadsheet
- Owner: News Corp Australia
- Editor-in-chief: Michelle Gunn
- Editor: Kelvin Healey
- Founded: 14 July 1964; 62 years ago
- Political alignment: Centre-right
- Headquarters: Surry Hills, Sydney, New South Wales, Australia
- Country: Australia
- Circulation: Four-week reach (July 2023 to June 2024): 1.82 million (print); 4.06 million (cross-platform)
- ISSN: 1038-8761
- Website: theaustralian.com.au

The Australian, including its Saturday edition The Weekend Australian, is a six-days-a-week broadsheet-format newspaper published by News Corp Australia since 14 July 1964. It is one of two Australian daily newspapers distributed nationally. Its readership as of September 2019, of both print and online editions, was 2,394,000. Its editorial line has been self-described over time as centre-right.

== Owners ==
The Australian is published by News Corp Australia, an asset of News Corp, which also owns the sole daily newspapers in Brisbane, Adelaide, Hobart, and Darwin, and the most circulated metropolitan daily newspapers in Sydney and Melbourne. News Corp's chairman and founder is Rupert Murdoch.

The Australian integrates content from overseas newspapers owned by News Corp Australia's international owner News Corp, including The Wall Street Journal and The Times of London.

== History ==
The first edition of The Australian was published by Rupert Murdoch on 15 July 1964, becoming the third national newspaper in Australia following shipping newspaper Daily Commercial News (1891) and Australian Financial Review (1951). Unlike other original Murdoch newspapers, it is not in tabloid format. At its inauguration, a national paper was considered commercially unfeasible, since newspapers mostly relied on local advertising for their revenue. The Australian was printed in Canberra, from where plates were flown to other cities for copying. From its inception, the paper struggled for profitability, and ran at a loss for several decades.

A Sunday edition, The Sunday Australian, was established in 1971 but was discontinued the following year because printing-press capacity was insufficient to print it in addition to The Sunday Telegraph and the Sunday Mirror.

The Australian's first editor was Maxwell Newton, who left the newspaper within a year. He was succeeded first by Walter Kommer and then by Adrian Deamer. Under Deamer's editorship, The Australian encouraged female journalists and was the first mainstream daily newspaper to hire an Aboriginal reporter, John Newfong.

During the 1975 election, campaigning against the Whitlam government by owner Rupert Murdoch led to the newspaper's journalists striking over editorial direction.

Editor-in-chief Chris Mitchell was appointed in 2002 and retired on 11 December 2015; he was replaced by Paul Whittaker, formerly the editor-in-chief of Sydney's Daily Telegraph.

In 2010, the newspaper launched the first Australian newspaper iPad application.

In 2011, The Australian launched a paywall with a AU$2.95/week charge (with a free 3-month trial) for access to its online content. As of October 2025, the subscription was AU$44 every four weeks after a reduced-price 3-month trial.

In September 2017, The Australian launched a Chinese language website.

In October 2018, Chris Dore, former editor of The Daily Telegraph, The Courier-Mail and The Sunday Times (Western Australia), was announced as editor-in-chief. He resigned in November 2022 following what was reported as "lewd comments" towards a woman at an event in the United States.

The following month, the newspaper's editorial board began investigating a senior editor after women employees filed complaints about his physical and verbal conduct at an after-work event.

Michelle Gunn was appointed in January 2023 as editor-in-chief – the first woman to assume that position.

Since 2019, The Australian has published an annual study, called Australia's Richest 250, which ranks the country's wealthiest people from one to 250, in order of their net worth.

== Coverage ==
The Australian is one of only two daily newspapers distributed nationally in Australia, the other being the Australian Financial Review. Daily sections include national news ("The Nation"), world news ("Worldwide"), sport, and business ("Business"). Contained within each issue is a prominent opinion/editorial (op/ed) section, including regular columnists and occasional contributors. Other regular sections include technology ("Australian IT"), media (edited by Darren Davidson since 2015), features, legal affairs, aviation, defence, horse-racing ("Thoroughbreds"), the arts, health, wealth, and higher education. A Travel + Luxury lift-out magazine is included on Saturdays, along with "Inquirer", an in-depth analysis of major stories of the week, alongside much political commentary. Saturday lift-outs include Culture (named Review until late October 2025) focusing on books, arts, film, and television, and The Weekend Australian Magazine, the only national weekly glossy insert magazine. A glossy magazine, Wish, is published on the first Friday of the month.

"The Australian has long maintained a focus on issues relating to Aboriginal disadvantage." It also devotes attention to the information technology, defence and mining industries, as well as the science, economics, and politics of climate change. It has also published numerous special reports into Australia's energy policy, legal affairs, and research sector.

The Australian Literary Review was a monthly supplement from September 2006 to October 2011.

The tone and nature of The Australian's coverage has changed over time, but since the late 20th century under the ownership of Rupert Murdoch and with Chris Mitchell as editor-in-chief, it has taken a markedly conservative direction.

== Editorial and opinion pages ==
Former editor Paul Kelly stated in 1991, "The Australian has established itself in the marketplace as a newspaper that supports economic libertarianism". Laurie Clancy asserted in 2004 that the newspaper "is generally conservative in tone and heavily oriented toward business; it has a range of columnists of varying political persuasions, but mostly to the right." It has been described in Politico Magazine as "conservative", and Claire Lehmann has described it as "partisan and narrow" in comparison with her intentions for her own magazine, Quillette. Former editor-in-chief Chris Mitchell has said that the editorial and op-ed pages of the newspaper are centre-right but "claims it is down the middle in its news coverage".

In 2007, Crikey described the newspaper as generally in support of the Liberal Party of Australia and the then-Coalition government, but has pragmatically supported Labor governments in the past as well. In 2007, The Australian announced their support for Kevin Rudd of the Australian Labor Party in the Federal election. Along with other Australian papers owned by News Ltd, The Australian has been highly and repeatedly critical of the Labor Party.

The Australian has presented varying views on climate change, such as those of Ian Plimer, Tim Flannery and Bjørn Lomborg. A 2011 study of the previous seven years of articles claimed that four out of every five articles were opposed to taking action on climate change.

In 2010, ABC's Media Watch presenter Paul Barry accused The Australian of waging a campaign against the Australian Greens, and the Greens' federal leader Bob Brown wrote that The Australian has "stepped out of the fourth estate by seeing itself as a determinant of democracy in Australia". In response, The Australian opined that "Greens leader Bob Brown has accused The Australian of trying to wreck the alliance between the Greens and Labor. We wear Senator Brown's criticism with pride. We believe he and his Green colleagues are hypocrites; that they are bad for the nation; and that they should be destroyed at the ballot box."

In late 2022, editor-in-chief Chris Dore resigned from The Australian citing health issues. After acting as editor-in-chief following the departure of Dore, Michelle Gunn become the first female editor-in-chief at the newspaper in January 2023. Gunn was replaced as editor by Kelvin Healey.

== Notable stories ==
=== AWB kickback scandal ===
Caroline Overington, a senior journalist writing for The Australian, reported in 2005 about the Australian Wheat Board funneling hundreds of millions of dollars to Iraq and the government of Saddam Hussein before the start of the Iraq War. This story became known as the AWB oil-for-wheat scandal, and resulted in a commission of inquiry into the matter. Overington received a Walkley Award for her coverage.

=== Stimulus Watch ===
In 2009, The Australian ran a large number of articles about the Rudd government's Building the Education Revolution policy, which uncovered purported evidence of overpricing, financial waste, and mismanagement of the building of improvements to schools such as halls, gymnasia, and libraries. On the newspaper's website, a section named "Stimulus Watch", subtitled "How your Billions Are Being Spent", contained a large collection of such articles.

The following year, other media outlets also reported these issues and the policy turned into a political embarrassment for the government, which until then had been able to ignore The Australian's reports. Along with the government's insulation stimulus policy, it contributed to criticisms, perceptions of incompetence, and general dissatisfaction with the government's performance.

On 16 July 2010, Julia Gillard was reported to have admitted that the school-building program was flawed and that errors had been made because the program was designed in haste to protect jobs during the Great Recession.

=== AWU Affair ===
In 2011, Glenn Milne reported on the allegations against Prime Minister Julia Gillard concerning the AWU affair, including a claim regarding Gillard's living arrangements with Australian Workers' Union official Bruce Wilson. Gillard contacted the chief executive of The Australian, resulting in the story being removed and an apology and retraction posted in its place.

On 18 August 2012, Hedley Thomas reported that Gillard had left her job as a partner with law firm Slater & Gordon as a direct result of a secret internal investigation in 1995 into corrupt conduct on behalf of her then-boyfriend Ralph Blewett. The story was ignored for a long time by other media outlets until after Gillard held a press conference to respond to the allegations against her. In 2013, the Fair Work Commission commenced initial inquiries into allegations of improper union financial conduct, and the government initiated a judicial inquiry into the AWU affair in December of that year as part of a royal commission into trade unions.

=== The Teacher's Pet ===
The Teachers Pet, an investigation into the disappearance of Lynette Dawson, is a podcast written by Hedley Thomas and Slade Gibson that ran in 2018. It was credited with generating new leads that led to the subsequent arrest of Chris Dawson for the murder of his wife, and the setting up of police enquiry Strike Force Southwood to explore claims of sexual assaults and student-teacher relationships at several Sydney high schools brought up on the podcast. The series has had 28 million downloads, was the number-one Australian podcast and reached number one in the UK, Canada, and New Zealand. Both Thomas and Gibson received Gold Walkleys for their work on the series.

== Columnists and contributors ==
Former columnists include Mike Steketee, David Burchell, Michael Stutchbury, Emma Jane, George Megalogenis, Glenn Milne, Cordelia Fine, Alan Wood, Michael Costa, P. P. McGuinness, Michael Costello, Frank Devine, Matt Price, Christopher Pearson, Niki Savva. Political cartoonist Bill Leak worked for the paper until his death.

Stuart Rintoul (active from around 1989) was a senior writer with The Australian, with some expertise in Indigenous languages and history. His 2020 book Lowitja: The Authorised Biography of Lowitja O'Donoghue, a biography of Indigenous Australian trailblazer Lowitja O'Donoghue, was shortlisted for a Walkley Award for Best Non-Fiction Book, and was highly commended in the National Biography Awards in 2021.

Columnists include Janet Albrechtsen, Troy Bramston, Henry Ergas, Ticky Fullerton, Antonella Gambotto-Burke, Adam Creighton, Robert Gottliebsen, Gideon Haigh, Paul Kelly, Chris Kenny, Brendan O'Neill, Nicolas Rothwell, Angela Shanahan, Dennis Shanahan, Greg Sheridan, Judith Sloan, Cameron Stewart, Peter van Onselen, Graham Richardson, Peta Credlin, and Claire Lehmann. It also features daily cartoons from Johannes Leak and John Spooner.

Occasional contributors include Gregory Melleuish, Kevin Donnelly, Caroline Overington, Tom Switzer, James Allan, Hal G.P. Colebatch, Luke Slattery, Noel Pearson, Bettina Arndt, Julia Gillard, Tony Abbott, and Lucian Boz.

Contributors to The Weekend Australian Magazine and Culture in The Weekend Australian include Phillip Adams, national art critic Christopher Allen, actor and writer Graeme Blundell, Jeremy Clarkson, Antonella Gambotto-Burke, author Trent Dalton, author Nikki Gemmell, poet Sarah Holland-Batt, and demographer Bernard Salt. Film critic David Stratton retired in December 2023.

== Australian of the Year Award ==
In 1971, The Australian instituted its own "Australian of the Year award" separate and often different from the Australian of the Year chosen by the government's National Australia Day Council. Starting in 1968, the official award had long had links to the Victorian Australia Day Council, and at the time a public perception arose that it was state-based. As a national newspaper, The Australian felt it was better situated to create an award that more truly represented all of Australia. Nominees are suggested by readers, decided upon by an editorial board, and awarded in January of every year.

== Circulation ==
In the June quarter of 2013, the average print circulation for The Australian on weekdays was 116,655, and 254,891 for The Weekend Australian. Both were down (9.8 and 10.8%, respectively) compared to the June quarter the previous year.

As of March 2015, the weekday edition circulation was 104,165 and the weekend edition was 230,182, falling 6.5% and 3.3%, respectively, compared to the same period in 2014. The Australian had 67,561 paid digital subscribers in the same period.

As of August 2015, according to third-party web analytics providers Alexa and Similarweb, The Australian's website was the 72nd- and 223rd-most visited websites in Australia, respectively. SimilarWeb rates the site as the 23rd-most visited news website in Australia, attracting almost 3 million visitors per month.

In June 2018, according to Roy Morgan, The Australian had a readership of 292,000 for the Monday–Friday editions and 576,000 for the Saturday edition.

In June 2019, Roy Morgan reported figures of 851,000 (June 2018: 831,000) for the print version (total, weekend, and weekday editions); digital versions 1,965,000 (June 2018: 1,965,000); total cross-platform 2,421,000 (June 2018: 2,564,000). (By way of comparison, The Sydney Morning Herald total figure was 4,125,000; The Age (Melbourne) 2,782,000, Herald Sun (Melbourne) 2,729,000. The only other nationally distributed daily newspaper, the business-focused Australian Financial Review, had 1,587,000 cross-platform readers.)

The paper had a 4-week-reach in June 2024 of 1.82 million in print, 3.56 million on its digital platform, and 4.06 million cross-platform.

== Awards ==
Several journalists writing for The Australian have received Walkley Awards for their investigative reporting.

In the 2nd IT Journalism Awards in 2004, The Australian won the top award, Best Title ("Gold Lizzy"), as well as three other awards.

The paper has won Pacific Area Newspaper Publishers' Association awards on several occasions:

- 2007 Online Newspaper of the Year award
- 2017 Daily Newspaper of the Year, Weekend Newspaper of the Year and Best Mobile site categories

== See also ==
- Journalism in Australia
- List of newspapers in Australia
- List of newspapers in New South Wales
- List of Walkley awards won by The Australian
- List of newspapers in Britain
- List of magazines in Australia
