= List of Australian game shows =

The following is a list of game shows in Australia.

== Current shows ==
Title	Network	Years
The 1% Club	Seven Network	2023–
The Chase Australia	Seven Network	2015–
Deal or No Deal	Seven Network (2003–2015); Network 10 (2024)	2003–2015; 2024–
The Floor	Nine Network	2025—
Hard Quiz	ABC	2016–
Hard Quiz Kids	ABC Family	2024–
Have You Been Paying Attention?	Network 10	2013–
Jeopardy! Australia	Seven Network; Network 10; Nine Network	1970–1978; 1993; 2024–
Mastermind	ABC; SBS	1978–1984; 2019–
Spicks and Specks	ABC	2005–2014, 2018–
Talkin’ ‘Bout Your Gen	Network 10 (2009–2012, 2025–); Nine Network (2018–2019)	2009–2012, 2018–2019, 2025–
Tipping Point Australia	Nine Network	2024–
Wheel of Fortune	Network 10	2024–

== Future shows ==
Title	Network	Years
Millionaire Hot Seat	Network 10	2026

== Past shows ==
Title	Network	Years
1 vs. 100	Nine Network	2007
31 Questions	Channel 31	2012–2014
AFL Lovematch	Fox8	2004–?
ADbc	SBS One	2009–2010
All About Faces	Nine Network	1971
Almost Anything Goes	Network 10	1976–1978
It's a Knockout	Network 10	1985–1987, 2011
A*mazing	Seven Network	1994–1998
Ampol Stamp Quiz	Nine Network	1964–1965
Are You Smarter than a 5th Grader?	Network 10	2007–2009
Australia's Brainiest	Network 10	2005–2008
Australia's Celebrity Game	Nine Network	1969
Balance Your Budget	TCN-9	1959–1960
Battle of the Sexes	Network 10	1998
Beat the Star	Seven Network	2010 (Cancelled before all recorded episodes could be aired)
The Better Sex	Nine Network	1978
Between the Lines	Nine Network	2011
The Big 9 (see Twenty One)	Nine Network	1969–1970
Big Square Eye	ABC	1991–1993
Binnie Time	GTV-9	1958–1959
Blankety Blanks	Network 10; Nine Network	1977–1978; 1985–1986, 1996–1997
Blind Date	Network 10; Seven Network	1968–1970; 1974; 1991; 2018
Perfect Match Australia	Network 10; Seven Network	1978, 1984–1989; 2002
Blockbusters	Seven Network	1991–1994
C'mon, Have a Go!	Seven Network	1985–1986
Cash Bonanza	Nine Network	2001
Cash Cab	Channel V	2007–2010
Casino 10	Network 10	1975–1977
Catch Phrase / Burgo's Catch Phrase	Nine Network	1997–2001, 2002–2004
Catch Us If You Can	Channel V	2007
The Celebrity Game	Network 10	1976–1977
Celebrity Name Game	Network 10	2019–2020
Celebrity Letters and Numbers	SBS	2021–2024
Celebrity Tattletales (see also Tattletales)	Seven Network	1980
Child's Play	Seven Network	1984
Coles £3000 Question / Coles $6000 Question / The $7000 Question	Seven Network	1960–1971
The Con Test	Network 10	2007
Concentration	Nine Network; Seven Network	late 1950s to 1967; 1970s, 1997
Match Mates	Nine Network	1981–1982
Crown Australian Celebrity Poker Challenge	Fox8	2006
The Cube	Network 10	2021
The Daryl and Ossie Show	Network 10	1978
Do You Trust Your Wife?	GTV-9	1957–1958
Dog Eat Dog	Seven Network	2002
Don't Forget Your Toothbrush	Nine Network	1995
Double Dare	Network 10	1989–1992
Family Double Dare	Network 10	1989
Double Your Dollars	Nine Network	1965
The Dulux Show	Seven Network	1957
EC Plays Lift Off	ABC	1994
The Einstein Factor	ABC	2004–2009
Fairway Fun	Nine Network	1960s
Family Feud (1977–84/1988–96)	Nine Network; Seven Network	1977–1984; 1988–1996
Bert's Family Feud	Nine Network	2006–2007
Family Feud (2014–2018/2020)	Network 10	2014–2018; 2020
All Star Family Feud	Network 10	2016–2018
The Family Game	Network 10	1967
Fear Factor	Nine Network	2002
Flashback	ABC	1983
Flashback	ABC	2000
Free for All	Nine Network	1973
Friday Night Games	Network 10	2005–2006
Fun with Charades	HSV-7	1956–1958
Gambit	Nine Network	1974
Game of Games	Network 10	2018
Generation Gap	Network 10	1969
Get the Message	Network 10	1971–1972
Gladiators (1995–96)	Seven Network	1995–1996
Gladiators (2008)	Seven Network	2008
Go Go Stop	Seven Network	2004–2009
The Golden Show	Nine Network	1960s
The Gong Show	Network 10	1976
Good News Week	ABC; Network 10	1996–1998; 1999–2000, 2008–2011
Good News World	Network 10	2011
Great Temptation	Seven Network	1970–1976
Sale of the Century	Nine Network	1980–2001
Temptation	Nine Network	2005–2009
The Great TV Game Show	Network 10	1989
Greed	Network 10	2001
Guess What?	Nine Network	1992–1993
Have a Go	Seven Network	1987
Head 2 Head	ABC	2006
High Rollers	Seven Network	1975
Hole in the Wall	Nine Network	2008
Hot Streak	Seven Network	1998
I Do, I Do	Network 10	1996
It's Academic	Network 10; Seven Network; 7two	1968–1970; 1970–1980, 2005–2015
It Could Be You	Nine Network	1960–1967, 1969, 1982
It Pays to Be Funny	ATN-7 and GTV-9	1957–1958
I've Got a Secret	HSV-7, Network 10	1956–1958, 1966, 1968–1969
Jigsaw	Nine Network	1960s
Joker Poker	Network 10	2005
Keynotes	Nine Network	1964, 1992–1993
The Krypton Factor	ABC	1987
Lab Rats Challenge	Nine Network; Seven Network; ABC3	2008–2014
A League of Their Own	Network 10	2013
Let's Make a Deal	Nine Network; Network 10	1968–1969, 1977; 1991
Letter Box and $50,000 Letterbox	Seven Network	1962, 1981
Letter Charades	Nine Network	1967
Letters and Numbers	SBS	2010–2012
Little Aussie Battlers	Nine Network	10 February 1998 (one off special)
Long Play	Network 10	1977
The Love Game	Seven Network	1984
The Main Event	Seven Network	1991–1992
Man O Man	Seven Network	1994
The Marriage Game (see also The Newlywed Game)	Network 10	1966–1972
Millionaire Hot Seat	Nine Network	2009–2023
The Newlywed Game	Network 10; Nine Network	1968; 1987
The Master	Seven Network	2006
Match Game	Network 10	1960s
Micro Macro	ABC	1978
Million Dollar Chance of a Lifetime	Seven Network	1999–2000
The Million Dollar Drop	Nine Network	2011
Million Dollar Minute	Seven Network	2013–2015
Mind Twist	Network 10	1992–1993
The Mint	Nine Network	2007–2008
Minute to Win It	Seven Network	2010
Money Makers	Network 10	1971–1973, 1982
Junior Money Makers	TVQ0 (Brisbane only)	1973
Move It	9Go!	2014–2018
My Generation	Nine Network	1995–1996
Name That Tune	TCN9 (Sydney only)	1956–1957, 1975) (The first game show on Australian television)
National Bingo Night	Seven Network	2007
National Star Quest	Syndicated	1978 (Talent show with a country theme. Made in Wollongong, aired on regional TV stations)
New Faces	Nine Network; Network 10	1963–1985, 1989–1990; 1991–1993
Noughts and Crosses	HSV-7	1957-1960
Now You See It	Seven Network; Nine Network	1985–1993; 1998–1999
Download	Nine Network	2000–2002
Opportunity Knocks	Seven Network	1976
Out of the Question	Seven Network	2008
The Oz Game	ABC	1988–1989
Pantomime Quiz	ATN-7 and GTV-9	1957
Pass the Buck	Nine Network	2002
Personality Squares (See Hollywood Squares)	Network 10	1967–1969; 1981
Celebrity Squares (see also Hollywood Squares)	Network 10; Nine Network	1975–1976
All-Star Squares (See also "Hollywood Squares")	Seven Network	1999
The Phone	Fox8	2009
Pick a Box	Seven Network	1957–1971
Ford Superquiz	Nine Network	1981–1982
Superquiz	Network 10	1989
Pick Your Face	Nine Network	1999–2003
Play Your Cards Right	Seven Network	1984–1985
Play Your Hunch	Nine Network	1962–1964
Playcards	Network 10	1969
Pointless	Network 10	2018–2019
Pot Luck	Network 10	1987
Pot of Gold	Network 10	1975–1978
The Pressure Pak Show	Seven Network	1957–1958
The Price Is Right (1957–1963)	ATN-7 (Sydney only); GTV-9 (Melbourne only); Seven Network	1957–1959; 1958; 1963
The Price Is Right (1973–2012)	Seven Network; Network 10; Nine Network	1973–1974; 1981–1986; 1989; 1993–1998; 2003–2005; 2012
Pyramid	Nine Network; GO!	2009–2014
A Question of Sport	Network 10	1995–1996
Quiz Kids
Quizmania	Nine Network	2006–2007
Quizmaster	Seven Network	2002
Race Around the World	ABC	1997–1998
Raising a Husband	GTV-9	1957–1958
Randling	ABC1	2012
Ripsnorters	Seven Network	1997
The Rich List	Seven Network	2007–2009
RocKwiz	SBS	2005–2015
Say G'day	Nine Network	1986
Say When!!	Nine Network	1962–1964
Spending Spree	Nine Network	1971–1976
Search for a Star	Network 10	1970–1971, 1981
Second Chance	Network 10	1977
Press Your Luck	Seven Network	1987–1988
Shafted	Nine Network	2002
Sharky's Friends	Nine Network	2007
Showcase	Network 10	1965–1970, 1973–1974, 1978
Simply Irresistible	Nine Network	1995
The Singing Bee	Nine Network	2007
Snakes and Ladders	HSV-7	1959
Spit It Out	Seven Network; 7two	2010–2011
Split Personality	Network 10	1967
Split Second	Nine Network	1972–1973
Sport in Question	ABC	1986
The Squiz	SBS	2009
Star Search	Network 10	1985–1986; 1991
Steam Punks!	ABC3	2013–2014
Stop the Music	HSV-7	1956–1957
Strike It Lucky	Nine Network	1994
Supermarket Sweep Australia	Nine Network	1992–1994
Surprise Package	Nine Network	1961
Take a Chance	Seven Network	1959
Take a Letter	Network 10	1967
Take the Hint	Nine Network	1963–1966
Talking Telephone Numbers	Seven Network	1996
Tell the Truth	Nine Network; Network 10	1959–1965; 1971–1972)
That's My Desire	HSV-7	1958–1960
Theatre Sports	ABC	1987
Think Tank	ABC	2018–2019
Three on a Match	Seven Network	1973–?
Tic-Tac-Dough	Nine Network	1960–1964
Crossfire	Nine Network	1987–1988
Time Masters	Seven Network	1996–1998
The Tommy Hanlon Show	Nine Network	1967–1968
Total Recall	Seven Network	1994–1995
Treasure Hunt	Network 10	1977–1978
The Trivial Video Show	Seven Network	1986
TV Talent Scout	Seven Network	1957–1958
University Challenge	ABC	1987–1989
The Up-Late Game Show	Network 10	2005–2006
Video Village	Nine Network	1960s
Vidiot	ABC	1992–1994
Visquiz	SBS	1985
The Weakest Link	Seven Network	2001–2002
The Wall	Seven Network	2017
What Do You Know?	ABC3	2010–2011
What's It Worth?	ABC	1950s
What's My Line?	TCN-9	1956–1958
Wheel of Fortune	Seven Network	1981–2006
Million Dollar Wheel of Fortune	Nine Network	2008
Who Wants to Be a Millionaire?	Nine Network	1999–2006, 2007, 2021
Win Roy and HG's Money (see Win Ben Stein's Money)	Seven Network	2000
Wipeout	Seven Network	1999–2000
Wipeout	Nine Network	2009
Who Dares Wins	Seven Network	1996–1998
Who, What And Where?
Would You Believe?	ABC	1970–1974
You're A Star	Network 10	1982

== Longest serving Australian game show hosts ==
Host	Show	Duration
Andrew O'Keefe	Deal or No Deal / The Chase Australia	2003–2021
Larry Emdur	The Price Is Right / The Chase Australia	1993–1998, 2003–2005, 2012, 2021–present
Tony Barber	Sale of the Century	1980–1991
Glenn Ridge	Sale of the Century	1991–2001
John Burgess	Wheel of Fortune	1984–1996
Rob Elliott	Wheel of Fortune	1997–2003
Eddie McGuire	Who Wants to Be a Millionaire? / Hot Seat	1999–2023
Simon Reeve	It's Academic / Million Dollar Minute	2005–2015

== See also ==
- List of Australian television series
