= Surprise! Surprise! (1972 TV series) =

- Presented by: Tommy Hanlon Jr.
- Country of origin: Australia

Original release
- Network: Network 10
- Release: 1972

Surprise! Surprise! is an Australian television series which aired in 1972 on the 0-10 Network (later Network Ten). It was a daytime game show hosted by Tommy Hanlon Jr. who was assisted by Ian Turpie.

A review in The Age felt that the show did not properly utilise Tommy Hanlon Jr's talents, and described the show as being similar to his earlier series It Could Be You.
