= Take a Letter =

Take a Letter may refer to:

- Take a Letter (UK game show), a British game show that originally aired 1962 to 1964
- Take a Letter (Australian game show), an Australian television game show which aired 1967
- "Take a Letter" (Family Guy), an episode of the animated sitcom Family Guy
