= Bernard King (disambiguation) =

Bernard King (born 1956) is an American basketball player who played in the National Basketball Association from 1977 to 1993.

Bernard King may also refer to:

- Bernard King (basketball, born 1981) (born 1981), American basketball player
- Bernard King (television) (1934–2002), Australian stage actor, celebrity chef and television personality

== See also ==
- King (surname)
