= Personality Squares =

- Genre: Game show
- Based on: Hollywood Squares by: Merrill Heatter; Bob Quigley
- Presented by: John Bailey (1967); Joe Martin (1968); Bob Moore (1969); Jimmy Hannan (1981)
- Narrated by: John Blackman (1967-1969)
- Country of origin: Australia
- Original language: English
- No. of seasons: 4

Production
- Running time: 30 minutes

Original release
- Network: Network Ten
- Release: 1967 – 1969
- Network: Network Ten
- Release: 1981

Related
- All-Star Squares

Personality Squares is an Australian game show series aired on Network Ten in 1967 until 1969 and revived in 1981. It was hosted by John Bailey, followed by Joe Martin then Bob Moore and ran until 1969, with announcer John Blackman. The revival in 1981 was hosted by Jimmy Hannan. The format was based on the American game show Hollywood Squares.

The show was briefly known as "Celebrity Squares" when it debuted in 1967. The title was also used for the version on the Nine Network hosted by Jimmy Hannan from 1975 to 1976. Regular panellists included Chelsea Brown, Ugly Dave Gray, Bert Newton, Patti Newton, Bob Rogers, Barbie Rodgers, Malcolm T. Elliott and Beryl Cheers.

"All-Star Squares" was another version of the show in 1999 hosted by Ian 'Danno' Rogerson with announcer Gavin Wood.

The rights to this format, as of 2017, are owned by Network Ten, as its North American syndication subsidiary acquired the format from Orion Pictures in 1991.

== See also ==
- Celebrity Squares
