= Billy Raymond =

Scottish-Australian entertainer (1938–2013)

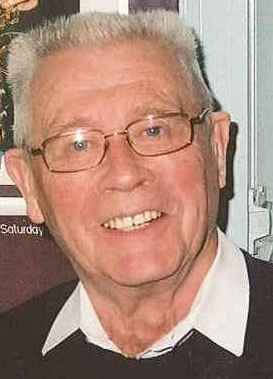
- Born: Raymond Jamieson Hubner; 6 January 1938; Paisley, Renfrewshire, Scotland
- Died: 15 May 2013 (aged 75); Australia
- Occupation: Entertainer
- Height: 5 ft 9 in (175 cm) [CONVERT]

Billy Raymond (6 January 1938 – 15 May 2013) was a Scottish-Australian entertainer.

== Early career ==
He was born Raymond Jamieson Hubner on 6 January 1938 in Paisley, Renfrewshire, Scotland, the second son of May and Lawrence Hubner.

Raymond became a Paisley Abbey choirboy and was called "Scotland's Wonder Boy Soprano" before his voice broke. Young Raymond gathered theatrical experience by performing locally during the 1950s while studying at the Royal Scottish Academy of Music and Drama (RSAMD). His first two records, first print 78 r.p.m. discs, second print 45 r.p.m., "Makin' Love/I Would" and "One in Particular/"Seven Daughters", were released in 1958, when he also appeared in his first networked BBC TV series, The Night and the Music. In 1959 he recorded another single on 45 r.p.m., "Charlie Is Their Darling"/"Loch Lomond". He made several guest appearances in the BBC Television pop series Six-Five Special.

In 1960, he was the compere of a touring pop show starring Eddie Cochran and Gene Vincent, during which Cochran was killed in a car accident. He also compered the summer season pop show at the Queen's Theatre, Blackpool, starring Marty Wilde and Billy Fury. In 1961, he got his big break on TV when he became the youngest-ever compere of Granada Television's musical quiz Spot The Tune, starring Marion Ryan. He also compered six episodes of International Variety Show and starred in his second Blackpool Summer Show at the Orion Theatre, Cleveleys. In 1963, he was the compere of "The Vera Lynn Show" which toured Australia and New Zealand. He extended his stay in Australia after the tour ended by starring at Chequers, Sydney, and made guest appearances in the ATN-7 Channel TV series Startime before returning to Scotland. In 1964, he returned to Australia to appear in ATN-7's two daytime series, The Golden Show and the quiz Jigsaw. Raymond also starred in seasons at Chequers, The Silver Spade, Latin Quarter with major American and British stars such as Kathryn Grayson and Shirley Bassey. He also released his first Australian album for the Festival label, Shamrocks and Heather. In 1965, he returned to Scotland and compered the BBC Radio series On Tour and Grampian Television's quiz series Try For Ten.

In 1966, he made a second series of Grampian's Try For Ten, was the compere of Scottish Television's beauty pageant A Search for Beauty and was one of the regional comperes for BBC TV's Come Dancing. In 1967, Raymond made a third series of Try For Ten and won the Scottish Television Personality of the Year award for his work on the show. He also released a 45 r.p.m. disc for the Scotia label with the songs "Royal Telephone" and "Will the Angels Play Their Harps For Me?" During 1968, Raymond made two further series of Try For Ten for Grampian Television. Raymond returned to Australia and co-starred with Reg Varney in Australia's Channel 10 TV series Rose and Crown. When Varney returned to the UK for a further series of On The Buses, Raymond starred in the remainder of the 56-part series. He also hosted Late Night Extra on Network 10. Raymond won the "Penguin" Award for "Best Support in a Television Variety Series" for The Rose and Crown. In 1970, Raymond took over as compere of The Generation Gap, a quiz show which had already been running for two years, that pitted the younger generation against the older generation, who answered questions relating to the opposing generation's events and interests. The show was networked throughout Australia. In 1971 Raymond again returned to Scotland to host a 12-part series for BBC TV Scotland of The Generation Gap.

During the 1970s, Raymond spent six to nine months each year in Australia starring in stage shows. He also appeared in three networked TV series for NBN Television in Newcastle, Australia, hosted ABC TV (Australia) Winner Takes All, starred in his own stage production of Scotland The Brave and A Touch of Tartan, and wrote and produced three TV specials of A Touch of Tartan for QTQ9 Brisbane, which was also screened nationally. Raymond was also a frequent guest on all major national and interstate variety and panel TV shows. However, Raymond paid the price of such a heavy workload by suffering a heart attack whilst performing at the Fairfield RSL Club. He was back at work six weeks later, compering Winner Takes All. During 1979, he toured the UK, Europe and the US during June, July and August. Also during the 1970s, Raymond recorded five albums released in Australia on the Festival Records (Australia) and CBS labels. The album A Toast to the Tartan reached Gold Record sales two and a half days after it was released and resulted in a total of four Gold albums. "The Kilt is My Delight" was released in April 1979.

In 1980, Raymond's eighth LP, A Touch of Tartan, was released and the stage production of Scotland The Brave continued to be one of Clubland's greatest draws. Raymond produced a 13-week series of "Tonight" variety shows for NBN TV through his production company, Glen-Martin Associated. During 1981, Raymond appeared in TV and radio shows – the top-rating radio station 2CH featured him in a "Nine O'Clock Special" and he had a smash-hit season at the Manly Music Loft Theatre Restaurant with a specially devised revue, A Toast to the Tartan, which also played an eight-week season in the Sir Joseph Banks Room Theatre Restaurant at Bankstown RSL. During 1981–84, Raymond and his company (GMA) were asked to continue producing shows for the competitive new "Club" theatre restaurant market. In late 1983, Raymond started working with the new FM radio station 2BCR-FM (Bankstown City Radio), featuring a reciprocal Australian–Scotland request programme heard by 1.5 million listeners each Sunday morning on Radio Forth in Scotland. The success of this show resulted in the management of 2BCR asking Raymond to have his own three-hour-per-day, Monday-to-Friday show called Showstoppers, which ran until mid-1987. Raymond was invited to join the Board of 2BCR, which he declined but accepted a position on the station's Programming Committee. In September 1984, Raymond underwent a five-valve heart bypass operation to repair the damage caused by his near-fatal heart attack in 1976. Also during 1984, Raymond received a Golden Hand award by the Apex Club for his fund-raising performances for the Leukaemia Foundation at the Burdekin Theatre, North Queensland.

In 1985, Raymond again returned to Scotland to make a BBC Radio broadcast and also had interviews on Scottish Television. On his return to Australia he continued to work for 2BCR-FM until June 1987 as well as appearing on TV and touring with his new stage production "Sounds of Scotland". The show toured Sydney, Victoria and South Australia. At the end of June 1987, Raymond took the position of Director of the Burdekin Theatre in Ayr, Queensland, a position which he held for 15 years.

In 1994, Raymond underwent a second five-valve heart bypass operation. In 2003, he moved to the Gold Coast, Queensland and, in 2007, he became the Front of House Manager and Jazz Co-ordinator at the Gold Coast Arts Centre, Surfers Paradise, Queensland, interspersed with the occasional appearances with his stage show, Scotland The Brave. At the end of December 2009, Raymond resigned on amicable terms from the Gold Coast Arts Centre to concentrate on his upcoming tour of Australia in 2010. In 2010, Raymond released a new compilation CD album, The Pride of Scotland, which is available hard copy in Australia and in downloadable format. The album has 25 tracks of well-known Scottish songs. In 2010, he premiered his one-man show "Get A Life!!" which is a retrospective look at his 60-year career in show business.

In December 2010, Raymond underwent a major operation for the removal of a cancerous kidney. Despite ill health related to the return of cancer, in February 2013 he made a 14-day tour of the East Coast of Australia.

Raymond died of a cancer on 15 May 2013.

== Discography ==
=== Charting albums ===
List of albums, with Australian chart positions
Title	Album details	Peak chart positions
Title	Album details	AUS
Toast to the Tartan	Released: 1977; Format: LP; Label: Dyna House (CD 2034)	40

== Other sources ==
- "Who Do You Think You Are Kidding!", Colin Bean's Story. Author: Colin Bean. Published by Edward & George (1998). ISBN 0-9546034-0-0. ref. p. 79.
- American Rock'n'Roll – The UK Tours 1956–72. Author: Ian Wallis. Published by Music Mentor Books, York, England. (2003). ISBN 0-9519888-6-7. ISBN 978-0-9519888-6-2. ref. pp. 60, 66, 69.
- Gene Vincent and Eddie Cochran, Rock'n'Roll Revolutionaries. Author: John Collis. Published by Virgin Books Ltd. (2004). ISBN 1-85227-193-0. ref. pp. 31, 36, 39–40, 42, 44, 54, 64, 73, and 75.
