= Pot of Gold (TV series) =

Australian television series

- Genre: Talent show
- Presented by: Tommy Hanlon Jr.
- Judges: Bernard King
- Country of origin: Australia
- Original language: English

Production
- Running time: 60 minutes
- Production company: Reg Grundy Organisation

Original release
- Network: Network 10
- Release: 1975 – 1978

Pot of Gold is an Australian talent television series produced by the Reg Grundy Organisation.

The series was broadcast on Network 10 between 1975 and 1978. It was presented by Tommy Hanlon Jr., former host of the quiz show It Could Be You. Bernard King, a former judge from talent show New Faces, was the resident judge.

== Guest judges ==
- Joan Whalley
- Tommy Hanlon Jr.
- John Farnham
- Molly Meldrum
- Ian Turpie
- Graeme Blundell
- Briony Behets
- Lois Ramsey

== Revival ==
The series was revived in 1987 with a fresh title (Pot Luck) and hosted by Ernie Sigley. Bernard King resumed his role as head judge.
