= Jaynie Seal =

Australian television presenter (born 1973)

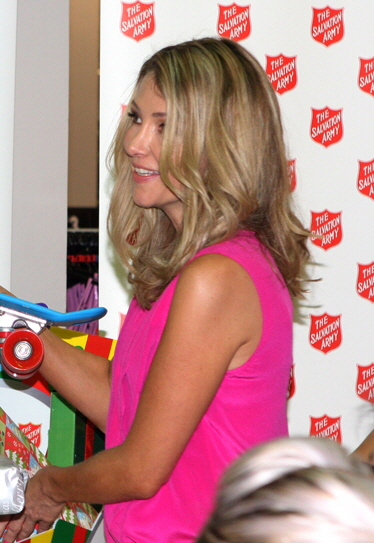
- Jaynie Seal at the 25th anniversary of the Kmart Wishing Tree Appeal, in November 2012
- Born: 18 May 1973 (age 53); Sydney, New South Wales, Australia
- Occupation: Television presenter
- Years active: 1999−present
- Children: 2

Jaynie Seal (born 18 May 1973) is an Australian television presenter.

Seal is currently a weather presenter on Sky News Weather Channel, news presenter on Saturday Edition and Sunday Edition on Sky News Australia.

== Career ==
Seal was part of the original team for the Weather Channel when it launched in 1999 and she found a passion for weather and live television.

In 2004, Seal joined the Nine Network as weather presenter for National Nine News in Sydney along with Nine Morning News and Nine Afternoon News; she remained in this position for 7 years. Seal has also worked on The Footy Show, Fresh, Today, ABBAmania, Hole in the Wall and Kerri-Anne where she also co-hosted for a week.

In late 2012, she rejoined Sky News Weather Channel as a weather presenter while also remaining with the Nine Network as an advertorial presenter on Today Extra.

In 2016, Seal added a role as news presenter on Sky News Live weekend morning programs Saturday Edition and Sunday Edition.

Coinciding with the launch of Sky News on WIN in September 2018, Seal was announced as the inaugural presenter of breakfast news program Headline News. Seal now hosts Sky News Breakfast across regional markets.

== Personal life ==
Seal is the mother of two boys and lives in Sydney.

She was also in a long-term relationship with television and radio presenter Ed Phillips until they separated in 2012.

Media offices
Preceded by Georgie Gardner	Nine News Sydney; Weather presenter 2004–2011	Succeeded by Amber Sherlock
Preceded by Originator	Nine Afternoon News; Weather presenter 2004–2011	Succeeded by Livinia Nixon
Preceded by Helen Kapalos (as news presenter)	Nightline; Weather presenter 2005–2010	Succeeded by Bulletin axed
