= Livinia Nixon =

Australian television presenter and actress (born 1975)

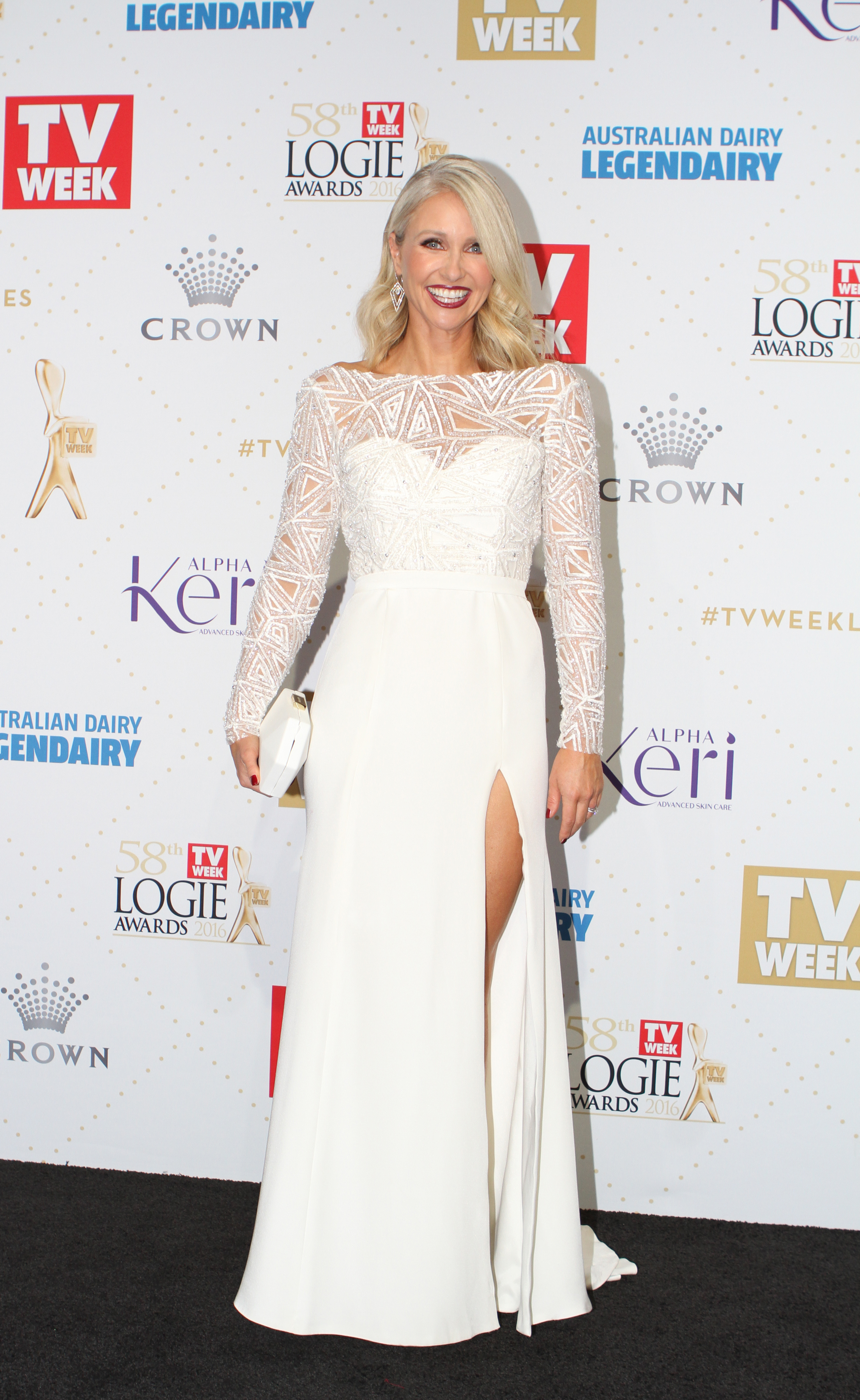
- Nixon in 2016
- Born: Livinia Helen Nixon; 19 March 1975 (age 51); Melbourne, Victoria, Australia
- Education: Lauriston Girls' School; Deakin University; Melbourne University
- Occupations: TV presenter, weather presenter, actress
- Years active: 1994-present
- Partner: Alistair Jack
- Children: 2

Livinia Helen Nixon (born 19 March 1975) is an Australian television presenter and actress.

Nixon is currently a presenter on travel and lifestyle programs, Getaway and Postcards. She served as the chief weather presenter for Nine News Melbourne from 2004 until 2025.

== Career ==
Nixon began her television career in 1994, making two appearances in Blue Heelers as a nurse at the local hospital. The following year, she appeared in an advertisement for Physical skim milk before she joined GTV-9 in 1997. She appeared on the children's show Plucka's Place in 1997, before moving to the iconic Australian show Hey Hey It's Saturday as co-host, from 1997 until the show's cancellation in late 1999. She has also worked in radio on Nova 100 in Melbourne and hosted the drive shift on TT FM with Ed Phillips for 18 months. It was during this time that she developed her on-air rapport with Phillips, which led to them to host the revamped version of Sale of the Century called Temptation. She was on this version's entire run from 2005 until early 2009.

Nixon has also appeared on the Today, Carols by Candlelight, Micallef Tonight, co-hosted Weekend Today, Things To Try Before You Die, co-hosted the Logies Red Carpet Arrivals (2008–2012) and co-hosted Test Australia: The National IQ Test with Eddie McGuire. She has filed stories for Getaway from Switzerland, Germany, the Netherlands, Samoa, Japan, France, India and around Australia.

In 2009, Nixon appeared in both Hey Hey It's Saturday reunion specials. The popularity of the specials led to the revival of Hey Hey It's Saturday in April the following year, in which Nixon resumed her role as co-host.

Nixon served as Nine News Melbourne's chief weekday weather presenter from 2004 until 2025, succeeding Rob Gell in the role.

In 2011, Livinia replaced Jaynie Seal as weather presenter on Nine Afternoon News. The national edition of Nine Afternoon News was axed in 2017 and replaced by local statewide editions. She began presenting the weather on Nine Afternoon News Melbourne.

In July 2020, Nixon joined Nine Radio to host weekend breakfast across 2UE 954, Magic 1278, 4BH 882 and 6GT DAB+.

In November 2020, Nine announced that Nixon will host Carols by Candlelight with David Campbell. However, due to COVID-19 border restrictions, it was announced she would be presenting with Eddie McGuire.

In November 2025, Nixon resigned as weather presenter on Nine News Melbourne. Her final bulletin aired on 18 November 2025. She will continue to work with the Nine Network on Getaway and Postcards.

Nixon has been a fill‑in presenter on 3AW.

== Education ==
Nixon was educated at Lauriston Girls' School as well as Deakin University. She has also completed a Graduate Diploma in Applied Science at Melbourne University.

== Personal life ==
Nixon grew up in the affluent Melbourne suburb of Toorak.

Livinia is an ambassador for the Juvenile Diabetes Foundation and World Vision. She also travelled to parts of Thailand with World Vision after the tsunami in December 2004.

Nixon is married and has two sons.

She is a keen Richmond Football Club supporter.

Media offices
Preceded by Rob Gell	Nine News Melbourne; Weather presenter 12 January 2004 – 18 November 2025	Succeeded by Scherri-Lee Biggs
Preceded by National bulletin	Nine Afternoon News Melbourne; Weather presenter 2017–2025	Succeeded by TBA
Preceded by Jaynie Seal	Nine Afternoon News; Weather presenter 2011–2017	Succeeded by Local bulletins
