= Brodie Harper =

Australian TV presenter (born 1981)

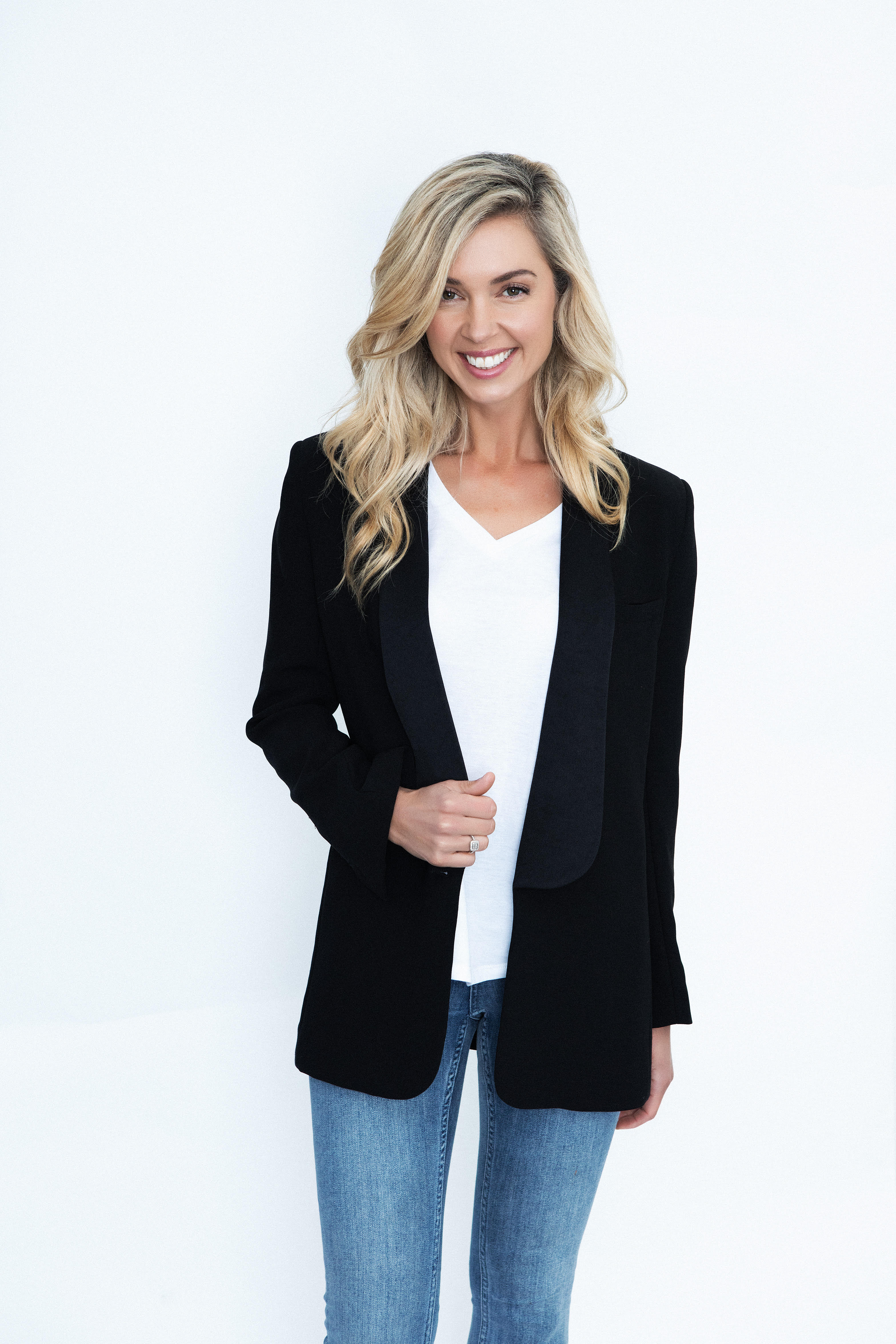
- Born: Brodie Harper; 1 September 1981 (age 45); Australia
- Occupation: TV presenter
- Years active: 2006-present
- Known for: Postcards
- Spouse: Heath Meldrum
- Children: 1

Brodie Harper (born 1 September 1981) is an Australian TV presenter.

== Career ==
Brodie Harper is a presenter for the Nine Network's travel and lifestyle program Postcards. She is also a weather reporter for Nine News nightly news bulletin, having filled in for Livinia Nixon. She has also appeared on other Nine programs such as Hole in the Wall and 20 to One.

== Personal life ==
Harper is married to Heath Meldrum, and they have one daughter together.
