= Ed Phillips =

Australian TV and radio presenter

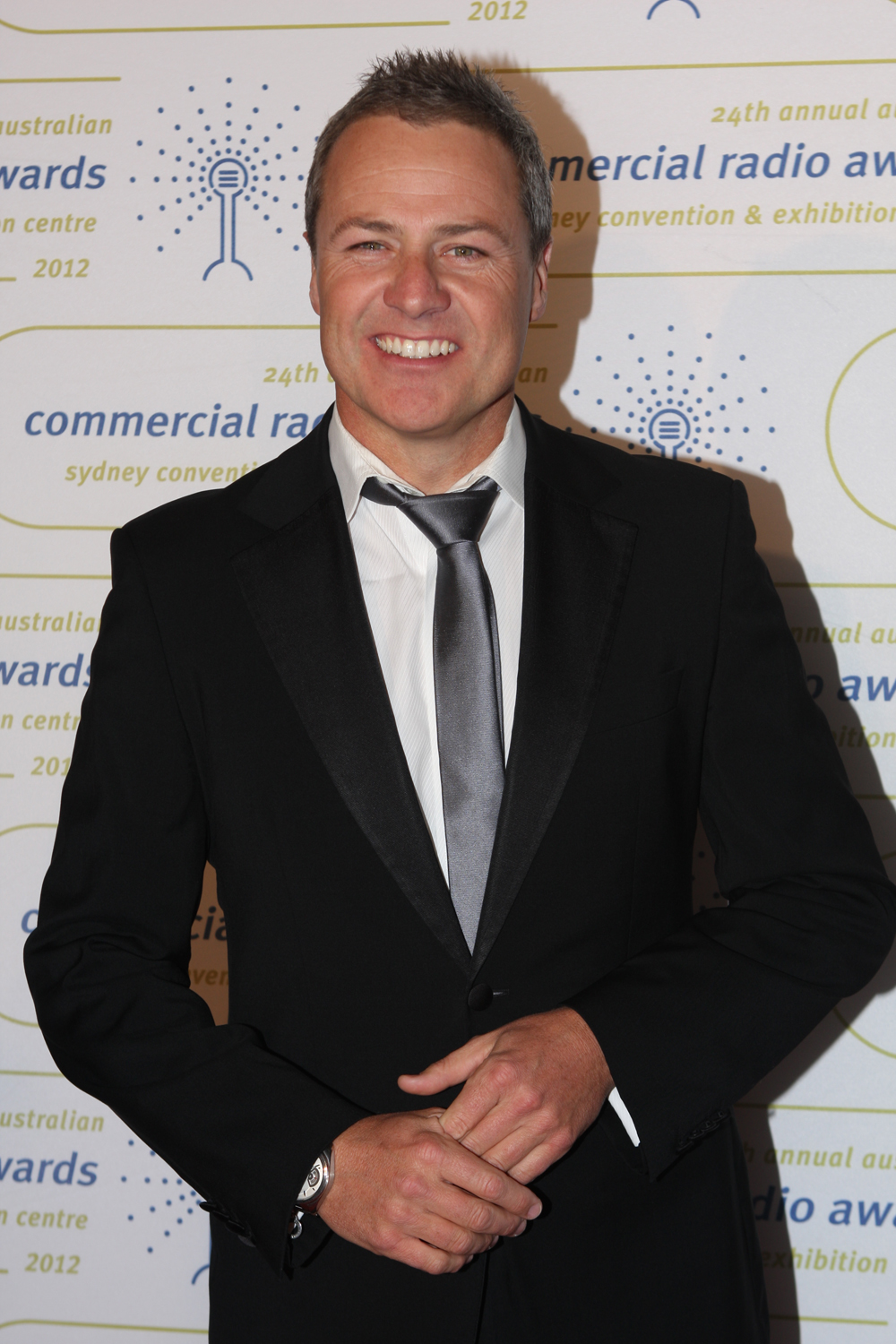
- Ed Phillips at the Australian Commercial Radio Awards (ACRAs), 2012.
- Born: 6 July 1966 (age 60); Sydney, Australia
- Occupations: TV and radio presenter
- Known for: Host of Temptation (2005–2009)

Ed Phillips (born 6 July 1966) is an Australian television and radio presenter.

== Career ==
Phillips began his career in 1988 with radio station Triple M, where he stayed until 1997. It was around this time that he acquired his on-air handle "Laughin' Ed Phillips", which eventually became more widely known than his real name. In 1994 he hosted television game show Pot of Gold, which lasted for two seasons.

He then made another foray into television as a sports reporter for the Nine Network (in 1997 and 98). From 1998 to 2000 he hosted an afternoon drive show on Melbourne's TTFM (now KIIS 101.1) with his future Temptation co-host Livinia Nixon. In 1998 Phillips hosted a game show on Network Ten named Battle of the Sexes. Afterwards, he became a senior presenter on Australia's Weather Channel.

He was also a popular fixture on daytime TV as an infomercial host and live-cross man on Good Morning Australia. In mid-2005 he left Network Ten to move to the Nine Network as host of Temptation, which he hosted alongside Livinia Nixon until the show's cancellation in January 2009.

In 2010, he joined Network Ten's new morning program The Circle as a roving reporter and infomercial host similar to that of his position on Good Morning Australia. Phillips has also been a fill-in presenter on 2UE and hosted 'Destinations' on MIX FM.

In March 2012, Phillips joined 95.3 FM Sydney and 91.5 FM Melbourne presenting Drive. In June 2012 he appeared on the TV series The Block.

== TV roles ==
- Pot of Gold (1994–1995), host
- National Nine News (1997–1998), sports presenter
- Battle of the Sexes (1998), host
- Good Morning Australia (1999–2005), reporter/infomercial host
- The Weather Channel (2004–2005), presenter
- Temptation (2005–2009), co-host with Livinia Nixon
- The Circle (2010–2012), roving reporter and infomercial host
- The House of Wellness (2017–2019), co-host with Zoe Marshall

== Personal life ==
Phillips was the partner of Sky News Australia presenter Jaynie Seal until 2012. The couple have two children.
