= Hollywood Squares =

American television game show

- Genre: Game show
- Created by: Merrill Heatter; Bob Quigley
- Presented by: Peter Marshall; John Davidson; Tom Bergeron; Nate Burleson
- Announcer: Kenny Williams; Shadoe Stevens; Jeffrey Tambor; John Moschitta Jr.
- Country of origin: United States
- Original language: English
- No. of seasons: 14 (NBC); 10 (Syndicated; 1971-1981); 3 (Syndication; 1986–1989); 6 (Syndication; 1998–2004); 2 (CBS)
- No. of episodes: 3,536 (NBC Daytime); 27 (NBC Primetime); 16 (NBC Saturday Mornings); 812 (Syndicated; 1971-1981); 585 (Syndication; 1986–1989); 1,060 (Syndication; 1998–2004); 42 (CBS)

Production
- Executive producers: Merrill Heatter (1966-1989); Bob Quigley (1966–1981); Rick Rosner (1986-1989); John Moffitt (1998–2002); Pat Tourk Lee (1998–2002); Whoopi Goldberg (1998–2002); Henry Winkler (2002–2004); Michael Levitt (2002–2004); Drew Barrymore (2025); Nate Burleson (2025); Ember Truesdell (2025); Jesse Collins (2025); Dionne Harmon (2025); Madison Merritt (2025); Elaine Metaxas (2025); Vincent Rubino (2025); Jason Kurtz (2025)
- Camera setup: Multi-camera
- Running time: 22–24 minutes
- Production companies: Heatter-Quigley Productions (1966–1981); Century Towers Productions (1986–1989); Moffitt/Lee Productions (1998–2002); One Ho Productions (1998–2002); Henry Winkler-Michael Levitt Productions (2002–2004); Sony Pictures Television (Note: As Columbia TriStar Television from 1998 to 2001 and Columbia TriStar Domestic Television from 2002 to 2003.) (1998–2004); King World (1998–2004); Jesse Collins Entertainment (2025); Flower Films (2025); CBS Studios (2025)

Original release
- Network: NBC
- Release: October 17, 1966 – June 20, 1980
- Network: Syndication
- Release: November 1, 1971 – May 22, 1981
- Release: September 15, 1986 – June 16, 1989
- Release: September 14, 1998 – June 4, 2004
- Network: CBS
- Release: January 16, 2025 – present

Related
- Storybook Squares; Match Game-Hollywood Squares Hour; Hip Hop Squares; Nashville Squares; Celebrity Squares

Hollywood Squares (Note: Originally The Hollywood Squares, The New Hollywood Squares (1986-1989), then later stylized as H2: Hollywood Squares) is an American television game show in which two contestants compete in a game of tic-tac-toe to win cash and prizes. The show originally aired as a pilot on NBC in 1965, and debuted as a regular series in October 1966. The board for the game is a 3 × 3 vertical stack of open-faced cubes, each occupied by a celebrity seated at a desk facing the contestants. The stars are asked questions by the host and the contestants judge the truth based on their answers to gain squares in the right pattern to win the game.

Though Hollywood Squares was a legitimate game show, the game largely acted as the background for the show's comedy in the form of joke answers (commonly called "zingers" by the production staff), often given by the stars prior to their real answer. The show's writers usually supplied the jokes. In addition, the stars were given the questions' subjects and bluffs before the show. The show was scripted in this sense, but the gameplay was not. The original host Peter Marshall explained at the beginning of the Secret Square game, "the celebrities were briefed before the show to help them with bluff answers, but they are hearing the actual questions for the first time."

Marshall hosted the original version of Hollywood Squares that aired on NBC from 1966 to 1980, as well as a nighttime syndicated version that ran from 1971 to 1981. It then returned to NBC in 1983 as part of a 60-minute hybrid series with Match Game, featuring Jon Bauman hosting the Hollywood Squares portion of that show. Following Marshall's retirement, the show has since been revived twice in syndication: a version hosted by John Davidson from 1986 to 1989, and another hosted by Tom Bergeron from 1998 to 2004. Three revivals were run from 2012 to 2024 with a different title all on Paramount cable channels: Hip Hop Squares, originally on MTV2 with Peter Rosenberg in 2012 and on VH1 with DeRay Davis from 2017 to 2019; Nashville Squares, on CMT with Bob Saget in 2019, and Celebrity Squares on VH1 with John "DC Young Fly" Whitfield from 2023 to 2024.

In 2013, TV Guide ranked it at No. 7 in its list of the 60 greatest game shows ever. Internationally, there have been multiple versions produced under a variety of names (see International versions below). When combined with two spinoffs of the franchise, the show has been produced for seven different decades.

In May 2024, it was announced that the show would be revived by CBS (which has owned the rights to the program since 2000, when it acquired format owner King World), with Drew Barrymore as a co-executive producer and center square, and Nate Burleson as host. The series premiered on January 16, 2025. On February 24, 2025, the revival was renewed for a second season, which premiered on January 7, 2026.

== Gameplay ==
Two contestants compete in every match, with one playing the letter X and the other the letter O (referred to as "circle") in a game of tic-tac-toe. The tic-tac-toe board features nine celebrities, each seated behind a square of a three-by-three grid game board.

Taking turns, each contestant selects a square. The celebrity in that square is asked a question by the host and gives an answer, typically preceded by a comedic response known as a "zinger". The contestant may then choose to agree or disagree with the answer given by the celebrity. Correctly agreeing or disagreeing awards the contestant's symbol, while doing so incorrectly awards the opponent's symbol, unless doing so would result in an automatic win for the opponent. As in the regular game of tic-tac-toe, the objective is to create three in a row of the same symbol vertically, horizontally, or diagonally. Should a game develop in such a way that it is impossible to achieve three in a row, the round is won by whichever contestant is able to place their letter in at least five squares (a majority of the board).

== 1966–1981 ==
Title card for the original 1966–1981 version

Bert Parks hosted the 1965 pilot of Hollywood Squares, which was taped at CBS Television City. A second pilot was taped with comedian Sandy Baron as host. Neither Parks nor Baron were considered to host the series, partly because NBC was "looking for a complete non-entity", and partly because Baron was considered "too New Yorky". NBC acquired the rights to the show, which debuted on October 17, 1966, with Peter Marshall as host, a job he held for 15 years. Marshall agreed to host because he did not want rival Dan Rowan to host. Hollywood Squares was the final addition to a short-lived game show powerhouse block on NBC, which for the next two years also included Concentration, Jeopardy!, You Don't Say!, Let's Make a Deal, Match Game and others. During most of its daytime run, NBC broadcast The Hollywood Squares at 11:30 a.m. Eastern/10:30 a.m. Central; it dominated the ratings until 1976 when it made the first of several time slot moves. During its peak at its timeslot, the show attempted an hour-long trial format for the week of November 3–7, 1975, but it did not last long. The show begin falling apart and declining after the premieres of Stumpers! and 50 Grand Slam and lasted all the way to its cancellation in 1980. The show officially announced its cancellation by NBC executive Fred Silverman on February 27, 1980, citing the fact the set was outdated and the host was aging in contrast to the neon-lit sets of their newer game shows at that time. The daytime show aired its 3,536th and last episode on June 20, 1980, when it was canceled to make way for a talk show with David Letterman that would become a precursor to his Late Night and Late Show programs.

The show also ran at night, first on NBC from January 12 to September 13, 1968, as a mid-season replacement for the short-lived sitcom Accidental Family. A nighttime syndicated program ran from November 1, 1971, until May 22, 1981. Initially airing once weekly, the syndicated Squares added a second airing in 1972 and began airing daily or nightly in September 1980, the show's final season.

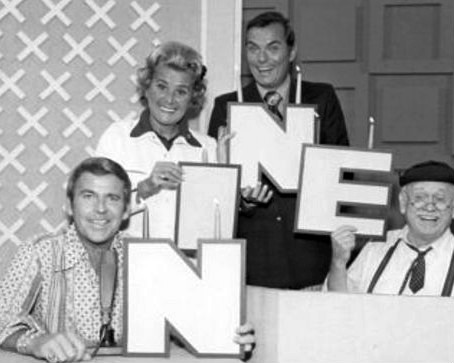
Celebrating the start of its ninth year on the air in 1974, (L–R) are Paul Lynde, Rose Marie, host Peter Marshall and Cliff Arquette as Charley Weaver.

The daytime series was played as a best two-out-of-three match between a returning champion and an opponent, with each game worth $200/$400 per match (originally $100 for each game and an additional $300 for the match, totaling $500). Originally, a five-match champion retired with an additional $2,500, the Secret Square prize package (if not yet won), and a new car; the cash bonus was increased through the years. By 1976, the prize for a five-day champion included additional cash ($5,000 or $10,000), two new cars, and a luxury vacation, with a total value of somewhere between $20,000 and $25,000. In September 1976, an endgame was added after each match, with the champion simply selecting a star, each of whom held an envelope with a prize; the top prize was $5,000, with additional prizes ranging from small kitchen appliances to items worth up to about $2,000.

The nighttime versions featured the same two contestants playing for the entire half-hour, with each completed game worth $300 (NBC prime time) or $250 (syndicated). On the syndicated version, if time ran out with a game still in progress (interrupted by a loud horn that the host called "the tacky buzzer"), each X or O on the board at that point was worth an additional $50 to the contestants, with each contestant guaranteed at least $100 in total winnings. The contestant with the most money at the end of the show won a bonus prize, which for the first seven years of the syndicated series was a car. From 1978 to 1980, the endgame described above was used with each prize worth at least $5,000 including a new car; cash prizes of $5,000 and $10,000 were also available. If the match ended in a tie, one final question was played with the star of one contestant's choosing; if the contestant agreed or disagreed correctly, they won the match; otherwise, the match went to the opponent. The nighttime syndicated version's episodes were self-contained, unlike the daytime version where games could straddle.

For the final (1980–1981) season, the syndicated series left NBC's Burbank, California studio and moved to the Riviera Hotel and Casino in Las Vegas, Nevada. During the final season, games were no longer scored. Instead, the winner of each game won a prize, and if time ran out before a game could be completed, the prize went to the player with the most squares on the board. Additionally, eight of the season's winning contestants were invited back to play in a Grand Championship tournament at the end of the season. The final $100,000 Grand Championship Tournament was played in 1980 and won by Eric Lloyd Scott of Denver, Colorado. Prizes that year included a Geodesic Dome Home from Domes America, a Botany 500 wardrobe, a 50-day cruise on Delta Line, the first Apple II computer system, the original Sony Betamax, a camper trailer, a motorhome and $20,000 in cash.

=== Cast of stars ===
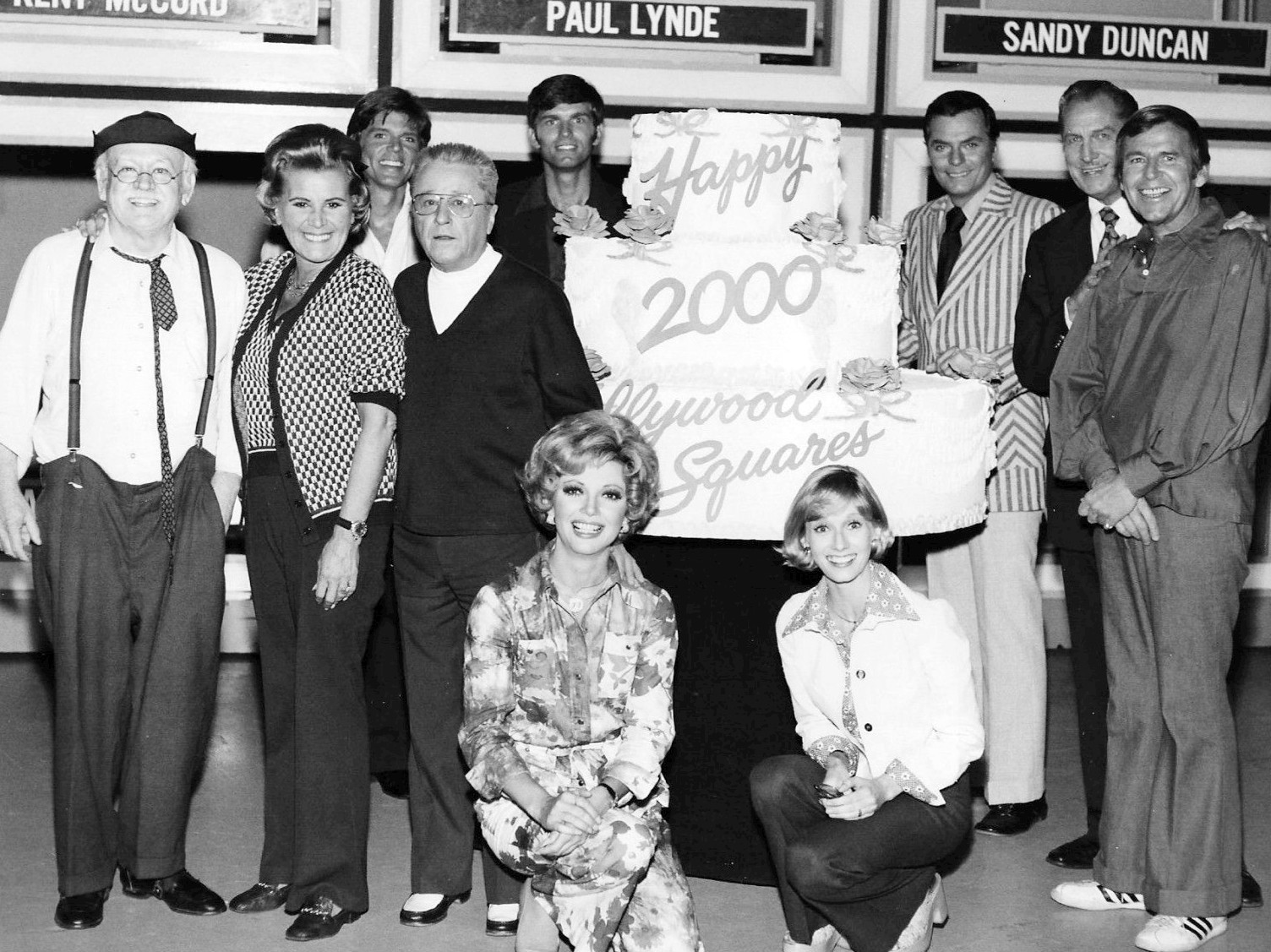
The 2000th show in 1974. Back row, L-R: Cliff Arquette as Charley Weaver, Rose Marie, John Davidson (who later hosted the 1986 revival of the show), George Gobel, Kent McCord, Peter Marshall, Vincent Price and Paul Lynde. Front row: Ruta Lee and Sandy Duncan.

Many celebrities became recognized as regulars on the show. Some regulars were frequently asked questions pertaining to a certain topic or category. For instance, Paul Lynde was frequently asked questions related to history or relationships, to which he would first respond with a clever zinger to get a laugh (usually a wrong answer but funny joke/punch line) before providing his answer. Cliff Arquette (in character as "Charley Weaver"), a history buff, excelled at American history questions; Rich Little almost always received questions about other celebrities, which allowed him to do an impression of that individual; Wally Cox was also given a lot of celebrity questions for which he usually gave the wrong answer; Roddy McDowall usually gave correct answers about the plays of Shakespeare; Rose Marie often received questions on dating and relationships, playing off her lovelorn comic persona; and Demond Wilson often responded with mock anger to questions that were carefully worded to play upon African-American stereotypes.

Lynde was featured in the tactically important center square throughout most of the show's original run. In 1968, after the first two years on the show, Lynde became the regular center square. Lynde's outrageous jokes earned him three consecutive Daytime Emmy Award nominations from 1972 to 1974. He left the series after taping the August 20–24, 1979, week of shows and was replaced by Wayland Flowers; Lynde returned when the series relocated to Las Vegas for the 1980–1981 season.

=== Secret Square ===
The Secret Square game is played as the first game on a given broadcast (or the first complete game, if a show began with a game already in progress) during the daytime series. In this game, a randomly selected Secret Square is shown only to the home audience by the shot of the television camera. A contestant who picked that square during the game won a bonus prize package if they correctly agreed or disagreed with the star. Secret Square prize packages added cash on the daytime edition, which started at around $1,000 for the 1966 episodes; the base amount increased in the later years from 1967 to 1980, by which time a new Secret Square package was worth around $3,500 to $4,500. The package grew daily until won. The question for the star was sealed in a special envelope and was almost always multiple-choice.

For the 1968 NBC primetime series, the first two games were the Secret Square games. One Secret Square offered a trip and the other Secret Square offered a car or occasionally a boat. If not won, the prize offered in the first round carried over to the second round, with a second prize added. If not won in the second round, the Secret Square prize package went unclaimed.

During the first two seasons of the syndicated series (1971–1973), the first two games were Secret Square games, with the prize packages generally worth about $2,500. If no one claimed the prizes offered in the first round, they were carried over to the second round, and if still not won went unclaimed. Beginning in 1973 and ending in 1978, the first three games had a Secret Square, with each game offering different prize packages, usually worth between $2,000 and $7,000. From 1978 to 1980, the Secret Square games were cut to game numbers two and three (the first two games early on). The Secret Square was not used during the 1980–1981 daily syndicated version.

== Storybook Squares (1969 and 1976–1977) ==
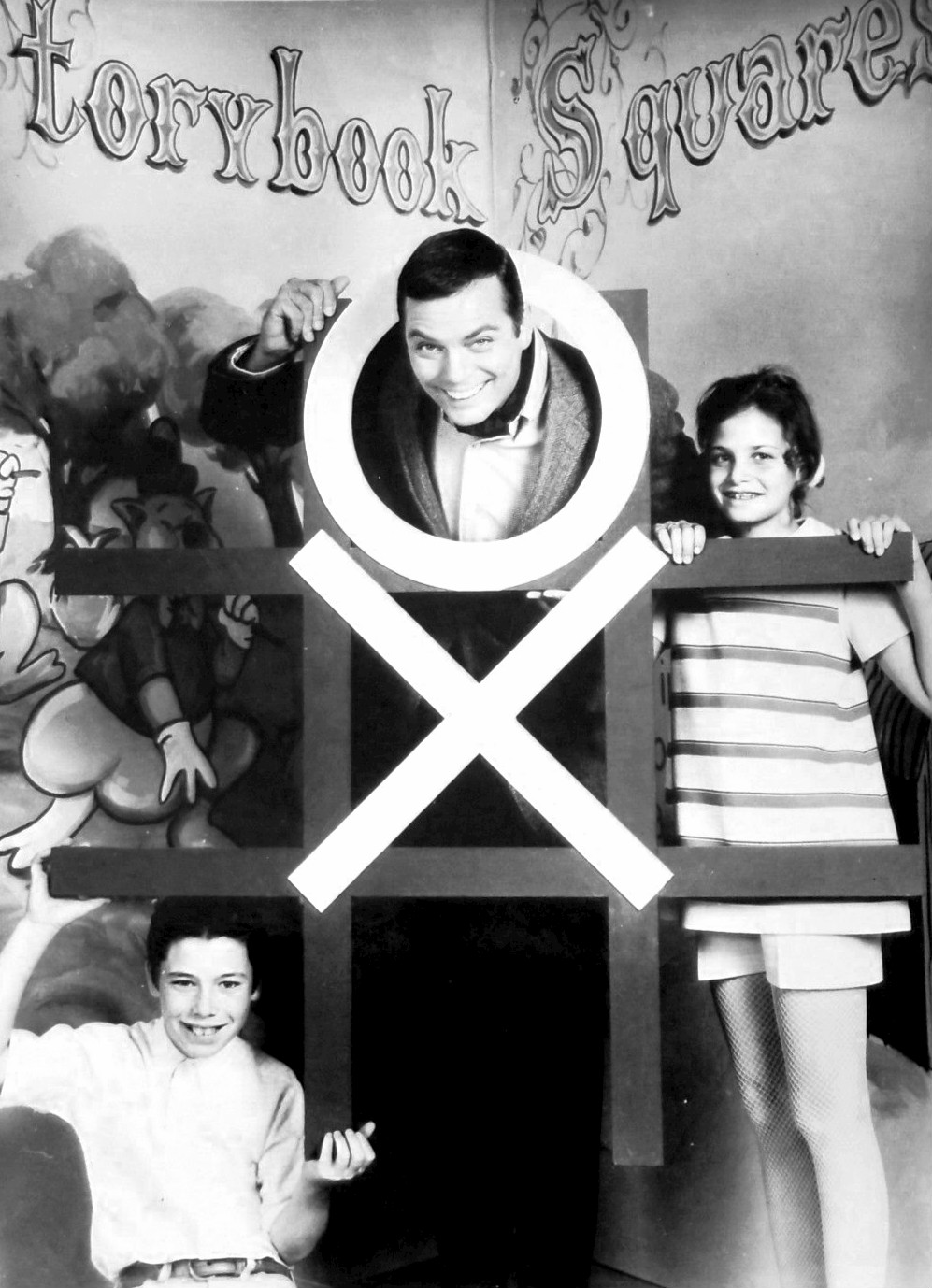
Peter Marshall hosting Storybook Squares in 1969

Hosted by Peter Marshall and announced by Kenny Williams, Storybook Squares, a children's version of Hollywood Squares, aired briefly on Saturday mornings on NBC from January 4 to August 30, 1969, and featured stars dressed as various fictional characters from television and fairy tales as well as historical figures from the past. NBC later brought the concept back to the daytime series in the 1976–1977 season with a slight retooling, where instead of children playing entire families played.

In an interview with E!'s True Hollywood Story on March 30, 2003 (episode 7.21), Marshall lauded the concept, but lamented that by the time each of the characters was introduced, very little of the show's half-hour format was left for actual gameplay.

== The Match Game-Hollywood Squares Hour (1983–1984) ==
In 1983, several years after Orion Pictures acquired Hollywood Squares rights owner, Filmways, NBC decided to attempt a revival of the series. What resulted was an effort produced by Mark Goodson Productions that combined the Hollywood Squares program, under license from Orion, with a revival of the Goodson-produced Match Game. The 60-minute program was dubbed The Match Game-Hollywood Squares Hour and debuted on October 31, 1983, at 3 p.m. Eastern, replacing the Peter Marshall–hosted series Fantasy. Jon Bauman (appearing as himself without his "Bowzer" persona from Sha Na Na) hosted the Hollywood Squares portion of the show. The only regular panelist on this version was Gene Rayburn, who reprised his role as host of Match Game; he always occupied the lower left square during Hollywood Squares, which Bauman also occupied during Match Game segments. Most of the semi-regulars were previously better known for Match Game (only on two weeks of episodes did a regular from the previous Hollywood Squares, George Gobel, appear on the panel). The announcer for this version was Gene Wood but was also sub-announced by either Rich Jefferies or Johnny Olson.

Hollywood Squares was always played as the second (middle) segment of the show, and featured the winner of the Match Game match played in the first half of the program playing O and the show's returning champion playing X, regardless of the player's genders (all other versions had women playing O and men playing X with exceptions, as noted above). This version of Hollywood Squares saw several different variations on the gameplay. First, the panelists were not given bluff answers or briefed. Second, the questions followed either a multiple-choice or true/false format. Third, for each square a contestant claimed $25 was added to their score with each game win starting at $100 for the first and increasing by that amount for subsequent games until time ran out and a winner was declared. In contrast to the original version of the show, players could win games by default if the opposing player incorrectly agreed/disagreed with a celebrity whose square gave the other player a completed row or five-square win. On all other versions of Squares, the player had to earn the winning celebrity's square on their own. The winner played the Super Match from Match Game for a cash prize.

The Match Game segment featured six panelists, as it had from 1973 to 1982; for the Hollywood Squares portion, a third tier was added to the panel seating area, with three more celebrities being introduced to the proceedings at the show's midpoint. All nine celebrities could play the Super Match.

The Match Game-Hollywood Squares Hour was not a success, and NBC announced its cancellation in the Summer of 1984, with the final episode airing on July 27, 1984. It was replaced the following Monday with the soap opera Santa Barbara, which ran for nine years.

== 1986–1989 ==
Title card for the Davidson run, used from 1986 to 1989

Two years after the cancellation of The Match Game-Hollywood Squares Hour, a new Hollywood Squares series was put into production. Referred to throughout its run as The New Hollywood Squares, the program debuted on September 15, 1986, and was produced by Century Towers Productions with Rick Rosner serving as executive producer, Ernie De Massa as producer, Paul Ruffino as Location Manager for remote productions, and Orion Television as a distributor (Century Towers was a subdivision of Orion formed to produce game shows, specifically this series and the 1987–88 syndicated revival of High Rollers; the name was in reference to the street that Orion was headquartered at the time).

John Davidson, who was a semi-regular panelist on the original Hollywood Squares, hosted the series. Shadoe Stevens was the announcer for the series and, beginning late in the first season, he also became a regular panelist occupying the bottom center square. Starting with episode #100, Stevens temporarily left the show to film the movie Traxx, and his brother Richard took over as announcer; Stevens returned for the final two weeks of the first season and remained until the series' end. After one season of rotating center squares, former Hollywood Squares panelist Joan Rivers joined the series as the permanent center square. Comic actor Jim J. Bullock also became the series' third regular panelist, usually in the upper-left square. All three took turns as guest hosts for Davidson; Howard Stern replaced Stevens as announcer/panelist during his week as host. All music for the program was composed by Stormy Sacks.

The game used the original version's rule that games could not be won due to an opponent's error. For the first season, each game was worth $500 with a bonus of $100 per square if time ran out in the middle of a game. Beginning in season two, the third and subsequent games were worth $1,000 (or $200 per square). If time had run out with the contestants tied, one more question was asked to one celebrity; if the contestant agreed or disagreed correctly, they won the money for one square and the match. If not, their opponent automatically won. The single-question format was also used on occasions where there was not enough time remaining for a proper third round. The contestant who finished with the most money won the match and went on to the bonus round. Contestants wore name tags on all episodes of this version except for the premiere.

This version lasted three seasons, ending on June 16, 1989. At the end of the final episode, a video clip from the first week of shows was run, introducing the celebrities who had appeared that week. Davidson, the panelists, the audience, and the crew then sang "Happy Trails" under the credits, with the crew members sitting in the squares and holding up signs that displayed their names and titles. The song continued under a montage of audio clips from the show's run as everyone faded away and the lights gradually went out, leaving only the squares illuminated, and the credits sequence ended on a freeze frame of balloons being showered onto the stage before the final fade to black.

=== Secret Square ===
The second game of each show was a Secret Square game. As with the original version, the Secret Square was revealed to the home audience at the start of this game. If a contestant chose that square and correctly agreed/disagreed with the celebrity's answer, they won a bonus prize (usually a trip), which was theirs to keep regardless of the outcome of the game. The prize did not increase in value from one episode to the next if it went unclaimed.

=== Bonus round ===
The first two seasons of this version of the series employed a bonus round that was similar to the one used on the 1970s game show Split Second. Five cars, each of the same brand/make, were displayed on the stage for the entire week. A new champion chose one of five keys in a bowl held by Davidson, then selected the car they thought it would start. If the key did start the car, they won it and retired from the show; if not, they held on to the key and could try to start one of the remaining cars with it should they reach the bonus game on the next day's episode.

Any contestant who won five consecutive games automatically won the only car still in play at that point and retired. If a champion's reign extended past a Friday, five new cars would be displayed on the following Monday and one would be automatically eliminated for each victory in the previous week, in ascending order of price. The champion would then select one of the remaining keys and try to start the car of their choice.

In the final season, each celebrity was given a key; five of them would start the cars, while the other four would not start any of them. The champion selected a car, then tried to start it using the key held by the celebrity of their choice. All five cars and all nine celebrities were in play every day, regardless of the champions' success or failure during the week. The five-day limit was removed, allowing champions to stay on the show until they either won a car or were defeated.

== 1998–2004 ==
First title card for the Bergeron run, used from 1998 to 2000

Second title card for the Bergeron run, used from 2000 to 2002

Final title card for the Bergeron run, used from 2002 to 2004

In 1991, as part of Orion Pictures' bankruptcy, its intellectual properties were auctioned off. King World Productions bid for and won the rights to the Hollywood Squares format; six years later, a revival series began development. Whoopi Goldberg was brought in to be the executive producer, with John Moffitt and Pat Tourk Lee as producers. The venture was to be a co-production of Moffitt-Lee Productions and Goldberg's One Ho Productions, in association with Sony Pictures Television and King World, who would also be responsible for distributing the revival; this differed from Columbia-TriStar and King World's other collaborations, Wheel of Fortune and Jeopardy!, where King World had no stake in production.

On September 14, 1998, the revival debuted with Tom Bergeron, who was also appearing as an anchor on Good Morning America at the time, as its host; former Nickelodeon host Marc Summers was also considered. In addition to her production duties, Whoopi Goldberg served as the permanent center square, with series head writer Bruce Vilanch, Gilbert Gottfried, Martin Mull and Caroline Rhea as regular panelists and Brad Garrett, Bobcat Goldthwait, Jeffrey Tambor, George Wallace, Kathy Griffin and various others as semi-regular panelists. Shadoe Stevens returned as an announcer but unlike the previous series, he was not a panelist on this version.

After the 2001–2002 season, Goldberg left the series and Moffitt and Lee were fired. Vilanch also left his writing position and Rhea moved to New York to host The Caroline Rhea Show, a daytime variety series launched to replace The Rosie O'Donnell Show; O'Donnell had decided to leave her namesake show before the end of the 2001–02 season and Rhea, who was chosen by O'Donnell to be her replacement, served as guest host for most of the last season. Stevens also left his role as announcer.

The 2002–2003 season launched with Henry Winkler and his production partner Michael Levitt as the new executive producers and Jeffrey Tambor as the announcer (in addition to retaining his semi-regular appearance). Winkler guest announced for several weeks during the season. Some changes were made to the overall production with the show adopting a new logo that referred to the show as "H^{2}". The set was given a new makeover where the contestant desks were replaced with podiums with LED screens inside and a rewritten version of the Teena Marie song "Square Biz" became the theme song.

After Goldberg's departure, at first, the show did not feature a traditional permanent center square. Instead, a new celebrity was in the center square each week. Ellen DeGeneres, Alec Baldwin and Simon Cowell were among those who played center square, as well as Peter Marshall, who appeared during a special theme week in 2002. Martin Mull was eventually chosen as the permanent center square for the 2003–2004 season (though some guests continued to appear as center square during a few theme weeks of that season).

For most of the first five seasons of this Hollywood Squares series, the first and second games were worth $1,000 to the winner. The third game was worth $2,000, and every subsequent game until time ran out was worth $4,000. If a contestant did not win anything in the main game, $500 was given to them as a consolation prize. In the early episodes of the first season, contestants only played for half the money; $500 was won for each of the first two games, with $1,000 for the third and $2,000 for all subsequent games, and $250 was given as a consolation prize for failing to win a game. The consolation prize amount was also used for each contestant's square if time ran out during a game and was counted towards their cash total to determine the day's champion.

The tiebreaker was the same as the previous versions except that the contestant who had won the most games, most squares overall, or won the last game played (whichever came first) had the option to play the question or pass it to their opponent, with a miss by either contestant giving their opponent the win by default.

For the first season of this Hollywood Squares series, two new contestants competed on each episode. A coin toss determined who would begin the first game during this time. Beginning in the second season, the returning champion rule was reinstated; a contestant could stay on for a maximum of five days. With this change, the incoming challenger began the first game of a match. The show ended on June 4, 2004.

=== Secret Square ===
The first season also saw up to two Secret Square games. In the earliest episodes of the series, two Secret Square games were played on each show with a different prize offered for each game. The Secret Square was played in both the second and third games of the day, but after two weeks, the Secret Square prize only carried over to the third game if neither contestant had claimed it by the second game. From the second season forward, the Secret Square was only played in the second game.

Beginning in the second season and continuing until the end of the fifth season, the Secret Square game was played for an accumulating jackpot of prizes that Bergeron referred to as the "Secret Square stash.” A new prize was added to the jackpot each day until someone claimed it.

=== Bonus round ===
The Bergeron Hollywood Squares employed three different bonus games during its six seasons on air.

==== First version ====
Originally, the show used the same "pick a star, win a prize" format the Marshall version had used during its last few years on the air. Each of the nine squares hid a different prize, with $10,000 cash ($15,000 in season 3) and a car being the two most expensive. The day's winner simply picked the celebrity they wanted and won whatever prize was in an envelope that the star was holding. As noted by Bergeron at the start of the bonus round for each episode, the prizes totaled over $100,000.

Beginning partway through the first season and continuing until partway through season four, the champion could only win the prize by correctly agreeing/disagreeing with the response that the chosen celebrity gave to a Secret Square-style question. A champion who failed to do so was awarded a consolation prize of $2,500 cash in the first season; this award was dropped once returning champions were reinstated in the second season. However, during theme weeks in which contestants only played once, the $2,500 was given for a miss.

==== Big money round ====
Beginning approximately two months into season four and continuing until the end of that season in June 2002, Hollywood Squares instituted a new high-stakes round in response to the recent trend of quiz shows offering big cash prizes.

The champion faced a general knowledge trivia round with their choice of any of the nine celebrities. Again, each of the celebrities held envelopes with varying dollar amounts hidden inside, ranging from $1,000 to $5,000 (increments of $500). If the champion picked a square that contained more than one person, the champion selected only one person from that square. The champion was given 60 seconds to answer as many multiple-choice questions as possible and was allowed to consult their celebrity partner for help; however, only the champion's answers were accepted. Each correct answer was worth the amount in the envelope, which was revealed at the start of the round.

At the end of the 60 seconds, the champion was given a choice to either quit with the money earned in the round or attempt to go double-or-nothing on an open-ended final question, with the category given to the contestant before they decided to play on.

==== Keys ====
As part of the overhaul done for the fifth season of Hollywood Squares, a new bonus round was conceived. Taking a cue from the 1980s syndicated series, the round involved contestants using keys to try to win prizes.

To start the round, a 30-second speed round was played. One at a time, the champion chose a celebrity and Bergeron would read a statement about them. The champion had to either agree or disagree with the statement.

Once the 30 seconds were up, Bergeron and the champion moved from the contestant area to the stage floor where the day's prize awaited. For each correct answer the champion gave in the speed round, one key was blacked out on a grid of nine. After the speed round, the champion chose one of the remaining keys. If the key performed the desired action, the champion won the prize.

If the champion did not win the prize on a particular show, they received $1,000 for each correct answer given during the speed round as a consolation prize. For each subsequent attempt to win the same prize, one free key was blacked out at the outset of the round.

Once the champion won a prize, a new prize would be available for them to try for if they returned to the bonus round the next day. The procedure for each new prize was the same.

For season five, the prize levels and the methods to win them were as follows:

- 1st win: Car (To win, the selected key had to start its engine.)
- 2nd: $25,000 cash (To win, the selected key had to unlock a safe containing the money.)
- 3rd: Luxury vacation or a trip around the world, worth $20,000–$30,000 (To win, the selected key had to open a steamer trunk.)
- 4th: $50,000 cash (To win, the safe needed to be unlocked.)
- 5th: $100,000 cash (To win, the safe needed to be unlocked.)

On occasion, a gift certificate to an upscale merchant was placed inside the safe instead of the designated cash prize. This was usually done for special theme weeks or tournaments.

Also, for theme weeks, each match's winner would have one extra key removed at the start of the round since they would only play once.

=== Final season changes ===
For the 6th and last season of Hollywood Squares, more changes were made to the series. First, John Moschitta Jr. replaced Jeffrey Tambor as the announcer, and Bruce Vilanch returned to the series as an occasional panelist. Second, the game format was scrapped in favor of returning to the best-two-of-three match format last seen on the NBC series in 1980. Each game was worth $1,000 and the first player to win the necessary two games won the match. The Secret Square was still played during the second game but the accumulating jackpot of prizes was discarded in favor of playing for one prize per match, regardless of whether or not the previous match's prize was won. Third, the format change resulted in the show no longer being self-contained, as matches could and often did straddle episodes.

The bonus round format from the previous season remained but with several changes. All nine keys were in play every time a contestant played the bonus round, regardless of whether they had won the prize in the previous round or not. Each correct answer in the first half of the round was now worth $500 if the prize was not won.

The prize structure was also changed, with the objectives the same as noted above. The new structure was as follows:

- 1st win: Vacation (worth approximately $10,000)
- 2nd win: $10,000 cash
- 3rd win: Luxury car (worth approximately $40,000)
- 4th win: $25,000 cash
- 5th win: Trip around the world

Season 6 theme weeks used the game format from the first five seasons, with each match played to time and the bonus round serving as the final segment. The winners of these matches played the bonus round for $10,000 cash or a car, and had one key eliminated at the outset before eliminating any additional keys.

== Hip Hop Squares (2012, 2017–2019) ==
Hip Hop Squares aired on MTV2 from May 22, 2012, until December 18, 2012, and was hosted by Peter Rosenberg; while the announcer was DJ Ms. Nix (a.k.a. Nicole Lyn). The show returned five years later on VH1 and was hosted by DeRay Davis (who was previously a panelist in the original MTV2 version) while the announcer was executive producer Ice Cube. The second edition ran from May 13, 2017, until September 17, 2019. While the MTV2 version played much like the original, the VH1 version featured celebrities as contestants playing for a member of the studio audience.

== The West Virginia Squares (2014) ==
From June 23–24, 2014, as part of an event called FestivAll; a one-off limited live stage version dubbed The West Virginia Squares streamed on local television station WVPB's official YouTube channel and on wvpublic.org in West Virginia only. Hosted by the original Hollywood Squares host (and local native) Peter Marshall reprising his role while the announcer was Bob Brunner. The trivia questions were mainly focused on the music and history of its state, for only four episodes were taped at the Clay Center. The celebrities that were seen in this version were: Larry Groce, Landau Eugene Murphy Jr., Bil Lepp, Donnie Davidson, Charlie McCoy, Autumn Blair, Joyce DeWitt (also a local West Virginia native), Charisse Hailsop, Danny Jones, Steve Bishop, Billy Edd Wheeler, and Michael Cerveris. DeWitt was also a panelist on the original version and (like Marshall) was a West Virginia native. The game contained no bonus round.

== Nashville Squares (2019) ==
A country music themed version called Nashville Squares hosted by Bob Saget aired on CMT from November 1 until November 29, 2019. Similarly to Hip Hop Squares (2017 version), celebrities played for a member of the studio audience.

== Hollywood Museum Squares (2021) ==
In 2021, The Hollywood Museum announced a limited-run revival of the series as a fundraiser for the organization. Dubbed Hollywood Museum Squares, each episode is introduced by Marshall and announced by Shadoe Stevens and Harvey (One Episode), with Davidson, Bergeron, Vilanch, Pat Finn and Marc Summers each hosting one of the episodes. The panelists for the game included Loni Anderson, Alison Arngrim, Rico E. Anderson, Gilbert Gottfried, Rich Little, Glenn Scarpelli, Jerry Mathers, Donna Mills, Judy Tenuta and Lindsay Wagner, among others. All participants appeared via videoconferencing over a 3D computer simulation of the 1986-89 set designed by Dustin James.

Writers included Louis Virtel from Jimmy Kimmel Live! and Jason Antoniewicz, a writer from Match Game, College Bowl and Tug of Words, to name a few.

The programs were directed by Steve Grant and Bob Loudin, who directed many television programs, including the Davidson Squares.

John Ricci Jr. and Philip Berman served as the executive producers.

== Celebrity Squares (2023) ==
On September 25, 2023, it was announced that a Black culture–themed version called Celebrity Squares, hosted by D.C. Young Fly (who was a frequent panelist on the 2017 version of Hip Hop Squares), would premiere on VH1 on October 17, 2023.

== CBS revival (2025-present) ==
A new version of Hollywood Squares premiered in January 2025, as part of CBS's midseason primetime schedule, with a random celebrity from any of the eight squares surrounding the center square taking announcer duties during the show's opening titles. Drew Barrymore serves as a co-executive producer and as the center square. Nate Burleson is the host. Originally scheduled to premiere on January 9, 2025, the premiere was delayed to January 16, 2025, being seen as sensitive due to the ongoing wildfires in Los Angeles and surrounding areas. CBS also scheduled an episode to air after its coverage of an NFL divisional playoff game on January 19, 2025. During the week of January 27, 2025, the four episodes that had aired to that point received extra airings in the daytime.

The first season of twenty half-hour episodes presented as ten hour-long broadcasts, concluded on May 9, 2025.

The revival was renewed for a second season.

=== Main game ===
The gameplay still remains similar to its predecessors: pick a star for the host to ask a question to them, correctly agree or disagree with their response in order to capture the square, getting 3 in a row either across, up and down, or diagonally, or earning five squares. The winning square must be earned by the contestant themselves and cannot be earned on an unsuccessful block attempt. The game win structure amounts have changed though. R1 is $1,000 ($250 per square), R2 is $2,500 ($500 per square), and R3 is $5,000 ($1,000 per square) for the win. However most of the episodes have wrapped up during or at the end of 2 rounds; round 3 was rarely played during the first season.

Any ties when match is tied are resolved with a sudden death question which decides the champion who advances to the bonus round. Otherwise whoever won the most money advanced to it, as in which, any money is added for each square if the current round is incompleted when the main game ends.

=== Secret Square ===
The Secret Square Star is now revealed at the beginning before round 1 and remains the same throughout the game until they are picked, or in the event of not being found the host will reveal who it was. During this revival run, they are playing for a trip rather than random prizes as in previous iterations. However, just as in its previous versions, the Secret Square has no bearing on the final totals to determine the winner of the game.

=== Bonus game ===
The Bonus game on the front end plays very similar to the 2002–2004 version of the Bergeron years. The contestant will run through the nine celebrities within 60 seconds by agreeing or disagreeing to a statement read about them. Unlike the Bergeron version, the host automatically starts with the celebrity in the upper left-hand corner moving right, until they either run out of time or reach the celebrity in the lower right-hand square. After the front half has been run through, the 2nd half of the bonus game is different from the Bergeron version. Instead of keys, all the squares have an envelope in them, eight containing solid blue cards and one containing the prize of $25,000 on it. If one of the celebrities captured in the front half of the bonus round has the $25,000 card in their envelope, or if all nine celebrities are captured, the contestant wins the prize.

== International versions ==
Color Key: Currently airing No longer airing Upcoming or returning version

| Country | Local title | Host | Channel | Year(s) aired |
|---|---|---|---|---|
| Arab World | سين جيم; Sin Jim | Shareef El Alami | Dubai TV | 1995 |
| Arab World | معجب عجيب; Mojab Ajeeb | Michel Kazi | Future TV | 2009 |
| Argentina | Ta Te Show | Leonardo Simons; Silvio Soldán; Fernando Bravo | Telefe | 1992–1997 |
| Australia | Celebrity Squares | John Bailey | Network Ten | 1967 |
| Australia | Celebrity Squares | Jimmy Hannan | Nine Network | 1975–1976 |
| Australia | Personality Squares | John Bailey; Joe Martin; Bob Moore | Network Ten | 1967–1969 |
| Australia | Personality Squares | Jimmy Hannan | Network Ten | 1981 |
| Australia | All-Star Squares | Ian 'Dano' Rogerson | Seven Network | 1999 |
| Belgium | Sterrenconnectie | Hans Otten | VTM | 1996–1998 |
| Belgium | De waarzeggers | Rani De Coninck | VTM | 2015 |
| Belgium | L'académie des 9 | Maureen Louys | La Une | 2015 |
| Brazil | Batalha dos Astros | Luíz Carlos Miele | TV Globo | 1983–1984 |
| Brazil | Jogo da Velha | Fausto Silva | TV Globo | 1989–1993; 2008; 2015 |
| Brazil | Paredão dos Famosos | Rodrigo Faro | RecordTV | 2021–2022 |
| Canada (Quebec) | Tic Tac Toc | Claude Mailhot | TVA | 1978–1979 |
| Canada (Quebec) | Tic Tac Show | Jean-François Mercier | V | 2013–2014 |
| Czech Republic | Čtveráci | Martin Severa; Barbora Štěpánová | Nova | 1999–2000 |
| Denmark | Stjerner på stribe | Jarl Friis-Mikkelsen | TV2 | 2013 |
| France | L'Académie des neuf | Jean-Pierre Foucault; Yves Lecoq; Benjamin Castaldi | Antenne 2 NRJ 12 | 1982–1987; 2015 |
| France | Le Kadox | Alexandre Debanne | France 3 | 1998–2000 |
| France | La Porte ouverte a toutes les fenêtres | Cyril Hanouna | France 4 | 2009–2010 |
| Germany | XXO – Fritz & Co | Fritz Egner | Sat.1 | 1995–1997 |
| Germany | Star Weekend | Marco Strohlein | RTL | 2000 |
| Greece | Τα Τετράγωνα Των Αστέρων; Ta Tetragona ton asteron | Maria Aliferi | ERT | 1979–1981 |
| Greece | Τα Τετράγωνα Των Αστέρων; Ta Tetragona ton asteron | Giorgos Marinos | Mega Channel | 2003–2004 |
| Greece | Τα Τετράγωνα Των Αστέρων; Ta Tetragona ton asteron | Smaragda Karydi | ERT1 | 2025 |
| Hungary | Esti Broadway | István Vágó | TV2 | 1999–2000 |
| India (Telugu) | Tollywood Squares | Navdeep Pallapolu | Star Maa | 2018 |
| Indonesia | Selebritis Indonesia | Joe Richard; Ferry Salim | Indosiar | 1999–2002 |
| Indonesia | Celebrity Squares | John Martin | NET | 2015–2016 |
| Israel | תשע בריבוע; Tesha BaRibu'a | Uri Zohar; Tuvia Tzafir; Eyal Geffen | Channel 1 | 1977–1982; 1993 |
| Israel | כוכבים בריבוע; Kochavim BaRibu'a | Shai Avivi; Ido Rosenblum | Channel 2 (Keshet); Channel 12 | 1999; 2025 |
| Israel | חכמים בריבוע; Hakhamin BaRibu'a | Avri Gilad | Channel 2 (Keshet) | 2010 |
| Italy | Il gioco dei 9 | Raimondo Vianello; Gerry Scotti; Enrico Papi | Canale 5 (1988–1992); Italia 1 (1992, 2004) | 1988–1990; 1990–1992; 2004 |
| Italy | Tris per vincere | Nicola Savino | TV8 | 2024 |
| Japan | 3・3が9イズ; 3 times 3 is quiz | Genzō Wakayama | TBS | 1970–1971 |
| Japan | うそつきクイズ; Liar Quiz | Jun Nagasawa | Nippon TV | 1979–1980 |
| Japan | クイズ スクエア; Quiz Square | Haruo Mizuno | Nippon TV | 1980 |
| Kuwait | 3 X 3 | Sherif Al-Alami | Kuwait TV | 1989–1991 |
| Malaysia | Celebrity Squares | Sharifah Shahirah | ntv7 | 2002–2003 |
| Netherlands | Sterrenflat | Ron Brandsteder | RTL 4 | 1999 |
| New Zealand | Personality Squares | Les Andrews; Jack Maybury | TVNZ | 1969–1973 |
| Peru | Michi Show | Luis Angel Pinasco | América Televisión | 1993–1994 |
| Poland | Dziewięciu wspaniałych | Wojciech Malajkat; Robert Rozmus | Polsat | 1997–1998 |
| Russia | Проще простого Proshche prostogo | Igor Wernick; Nikolay Fomenko | Rossiya 1 (1993–1994, 1996–1997); MTK (1994–1996); NTV (1997) | 1993–1994; 1994–1997 |
| Singapore | Celebrity Squares | Lawrence Chau | MediaCorp TV Channel 5 | 2001 |
| Singapore | Tic Tac Toe | Dennis Chew | MediaCorp 8 | 2003 |
| Spain | VIP | Emilio Aragón; Belén Rueda; José Luis Moreno; Mar Flores; Thalía; Juan Carlos Martín; Raquel Carrillo; Ana Chávarri; Tito Augusto; Miguel Lara; Pepe Viyuela; Arantxa del Sol; Juan Luis Cano; Jaime Barrella; Guillermo Fesser; Heather Parisi; Cannelle | Telecinco | 1990–1992 |
| Spain | Tres en Raya | Carolina Ferre | LaSexta | 2007 |
| Sweden | OAS | Lenhart Swahn | TV1 | 1972 |
| Sweden | Prat I Kvadrat | Fredrik Belfrage; Harald Treutiger; Martin Örnorth | Sveriges Television | March 2, 1983; 1985–1986; 1999–2002 |
| Thailand | ซุป'ตาร์ท้า OX; Superstars OX Challenge | Kitti Chiaw-wongkul | ONE | 2017–2018 |
| Turkey | XOX: Kare Akademisi | Yalçın Menteş | aTV; Show TV | 1993–1996; 2002–2003 |
| Turkey | Kandıramazsın Beni | Vatan Şaşmaz | Fox Türkiye | 2009 |
| United Kingdom | Celebrity Squares | Bob Monkhouse | ITV | 1975–1979; 1993–1995 |
| United Kingdom | Celebrity Squares | Warwick Davis | ITV | 2014–2015 |
| United States (original format) | The Hollywood Squares | Peter Marshall | NBC | Daytime: 1966–1980; Nighttime: 1968 |
| United States (original format) | Storybook Squares | Peter Marshall | NBC | 1969, 1976–1977 |
| United States (original format) | The Hollywood Squares | Peter Marshall | Syndicated | Weekly: 1971–1972; Twice weekly: 1972–1980; Daily/Nightly: 1980–1981 |
| United States (original format) | The Match Game-Hollywood Squares Hour | Gene Rayburn (MG); Jon Bauman (HS) | NBC | 1983–1984 |
| United States (original format) | The New Hollywood Squares | John Davidson | Syndicated | 1986–1989 |
| United States (original format) | Hollywood Squares | Tom Bergeron | Syndicated | 1998–2004 |
| United States (original format) | Hollywood Squares | Nate Burleson | CBS | 2025–present |
| United States (original format) | Hip Hop Squares | Peter Rosenberg | MTV2 | 2012 |
| United States (original format) | Hip Hop Squares | DeRay Davis | VH1 | 2017–2019 |
| United States (original format) | Nashville Squares | Bob Saget | CMT | 2019 |
| United States (original format) | Celebrity Squares | D.C. Young Fly | VH1 (2023); BET (2024) | 2023–2024 |
| Vietnam | Chọn ai đây | Trường Giang; Hứa Minh Đạt | HTV7 | 2020–2023 |

== Home versions and merchandise ==
Watkins-Strathmore produced the first two home versions of the show in 1967. Both versions featured a game board that allowed for writing in the celebrities' names under each square (using crayon, soft lead pencil, or a similar wipe-off medium). Each version included four decks of 45 question cards, one of which was marked with asterisks as the "Secret Square" question, which earned the player an extra $100 if answered correctly. Rules allowed for a 3-game match to be played, with $200 awarded for each game (just as the daytime rules specified).

Ideal issued a version of the game in 1974 with a picture of Peter Marshall on the box. Marshall was the original host of the television version throughout its entire first run. This was the first of the adaptations to feature humorous names for the celebrities. A similar board game based on the UK version under the title Celebrity Squares was released by Buckingham Toys five years later in 1979 with a picture of host Bob Monkhouse on the cover. It did not specify a "Secret Square" rule. Matches were best two-out-of-three with no money awards specified.

Also in 1974, Event Records released a compilation album entitled Zingers from The Hollywood Squares (along with two companion books) on vinyl LP and cassette, containing the audio of what were considered to be some of the show's funniest moments. A CD of the album was included in Peter Marshall's 2002 book Backstage with the Original Hollywood Square.

Milton Bradley produced two home versions, first in 1980 with a game loosely based on the Marshall version, then in 1986 for the Davidson version, with a 3-D board and twelve "celebrities" to insert into the board. Both versions specified that there was no "Secret Square" rule, and like the Ideal version, matches were best two-out-of-three with no money awards specified.

Parker Brothers released a similar 3-D board/12 celebrity inserts version in 1999, based on the Bergeron version. Early printings did not specify a "Secret Square" rule, but this was later revised so that every question card with a number ending in "5" was a "Secret Square" question worth $1,000 in bonus cash. Games were played until one player/team won $5,000. Alternate rules allowed for timed play (suggesting a 30-minute "as if you were on TV" game), with the player/team ahead once time expired being declared the winner.

GameTek released a version of Hollywood Squares in 1988 for MS-DOS, Commodore 64, and Apple II computers and later for the Nintendo Entertainment System based on the Davidson version. In 1999, Tiger Electronics released an electronic LCD handheld game based on the Bergeron version. In 2002, the official Hollywood Squares website had an online version of the show using the celebrities that were on that week. In 2010, Ludia released their version of Hollywood Squares for the PC, Wii, iPhone, iPad, iPod Touch and on PlayStation 3's PSN downloadable service from November 15, 2011; the games were based upon the 2002–2004 format and featured the voice of host Tom Bergeron and video clips of celebrities Brad Garrett, Kathy Griffin, Jeffrey Tambor and Martin Mull as the center square.

== Episode status and reruns ==
Of the over 3,000 episodes of the original series, "no one has an exact count" of how many still exist. A substantial number, mostly from the daytime run, may have been destroyed in accordance with NBC policy of the era.

Game Show Network previously reran a package of 130 episodes from Marshall's hosting run, the majority of which came from the syndication run during the 1970s. At least 13 episodes from the 1968 NBC primetime run are also known to have been part of the Game Show Network rerun package. It was noted at the time that substantially more Marshall episodes than the 130 that GSN aired are believed to exist, but for a number of reasons (including political correctness concerns and personality rights clearance issues) have never been rerun. UCLA has a handful of NBC daytime episodes in its film and television archive.

The Match Game-Hollywood Squares Hour episodes exist in their entirety and, barring a few skipped episodes, have been airing on the digital television network Buzzr, which is owned by Fremantle (the successor in interest to Mark Goodson Productions) since 2019.

The 1986–1989 syndicated series aired as part of USA Network's afternoon game show rerun package from September 11, 1989, to June 25, 1993. This version has not been seen on television since USA stopped airing them.

The 1998 syndicated series has been rerun on Game Show Network in the past, and every season (including the final season) except season 3, has been carried by the network over the years. Episodes were also rerun on GameTV in Canada. In July 2023, a Hollywood Squares channel was added to Pluto TV, featuring episodes from the final two Bergeron seasons. The channel was removed from the lineup in March 2025.
