= Postcards (Australian TV series) =

Australian television series

Postcards is an Australian holiday and travel television franchise, featuring advertorial content in a thirty minute format.

== History ==
There have been a number of versions of Postcards on the Nine Network. At one point, there were three, each serving a particular state. In 1995, Channel Nine Adelaide produced their first series. It promoted holiday spots within South Australia, encouraging viewers to travel within their state. Soon after, Channel Nine Melbourne launched their own state-based version (Postcards Victoria) and Channel Nine Perth followed in 1999 with Postcards WA.

In 2007, WIN Television purchased the Nine stations in Adelaide and Perth. The Perth-based Postcards WA was then renamed Postcards Australia and expanded to cover more parts of the country, using reporters positioned across the WIN Network, and in 2011 they axed the original Adelaide-based Postcards SA.

In March 2016, Postcards moved to a new Friday night timeslot and one hour format for the Perth, Adelaide and Melbourne markets. Rebecca Judd hosted the show alongside presenters Livinia Nixon, Lauren Phillips, Brodie Harper, Shane Crawford, Glen Moriarty, Scherri-Lee Biggs, Warren Tredrea and celebrity chef Shane Delia.

Later, the national program was discontinued, and a Victoria-focused Postcards returned. As of 2025, it is still being made.

== TV series ==
=== Postcards South Australia (earlier Postcards) ===
Postcards South Australia was produced by Nine Network in Adelaide and was shown every Sunday at 5:30 pm from 1995 to 2011 hosted by Keith Conlon. Other reporters included Lisa McAskill, Ali Carle, Michael Keelan, Chad Cornes, Mark Bickley and Kym Dillon. The series aired its final episode on 20 November 2011.

=== Postcards Victoria (later Postcards) ===
Postcards Victoria airs on Sundays at 5.30pm on the Nine Network across Victoria. The show was presented by Brodie Harper, Shane Delia, Lauren Phillips, Livinia Nixon, Madeline Spark, Kris Smith, and Todd Woodbridge.

The show has previously been hosted by Shane Crawford, Rebecca Judd, Giaan Rooney, Bridget McIntyre, Suzie Wilks and Geoff "Coxy" Cox.

Postcards was produced by the Nine Network in Melbourne and was hosted by Rebecca Judd along with presenters Livinia Nixon, Lauren Phillips, Brodie Harper, Shane Crawford, Glen Moriarty, Scherri-Lee Biggs, Warren Tredrea and celebrity chef Shane Delia. The show aired in the Perth, Adelaide and Melbourne markets on Friday nights at 7.30pm.

=== Postcards Western Australia ===
Postcards WA was produced by the Nine Network in Perth. It was first launched in April 1998 and was hosted by Philippa O'Connell who was joined by co-host Paul Entwistle in 2003. Reporters for the show included Ryan Campbell, Teresa Spiniello, Craig James, Fiona Argyle and Dan Paris. In 2009, a brief series of Postcards WA was broadcast with host Angela Tsun.

=== Postcards Australia ===
Postcards Australia was produced by WIN Television and WIN Digital Media and showcased destinations around Australia and later also New Zealand. Hosted by Scott McRae, series two was seen across Australia and was also seen on Discovery Travel & Living in South East Asia, Korea, China and New Zealand.

== See also ==
- List of longest-running Australian television series
- List of Australian television series
- List of Nine Network programs
