= Greg Thomson =

Australian journalist

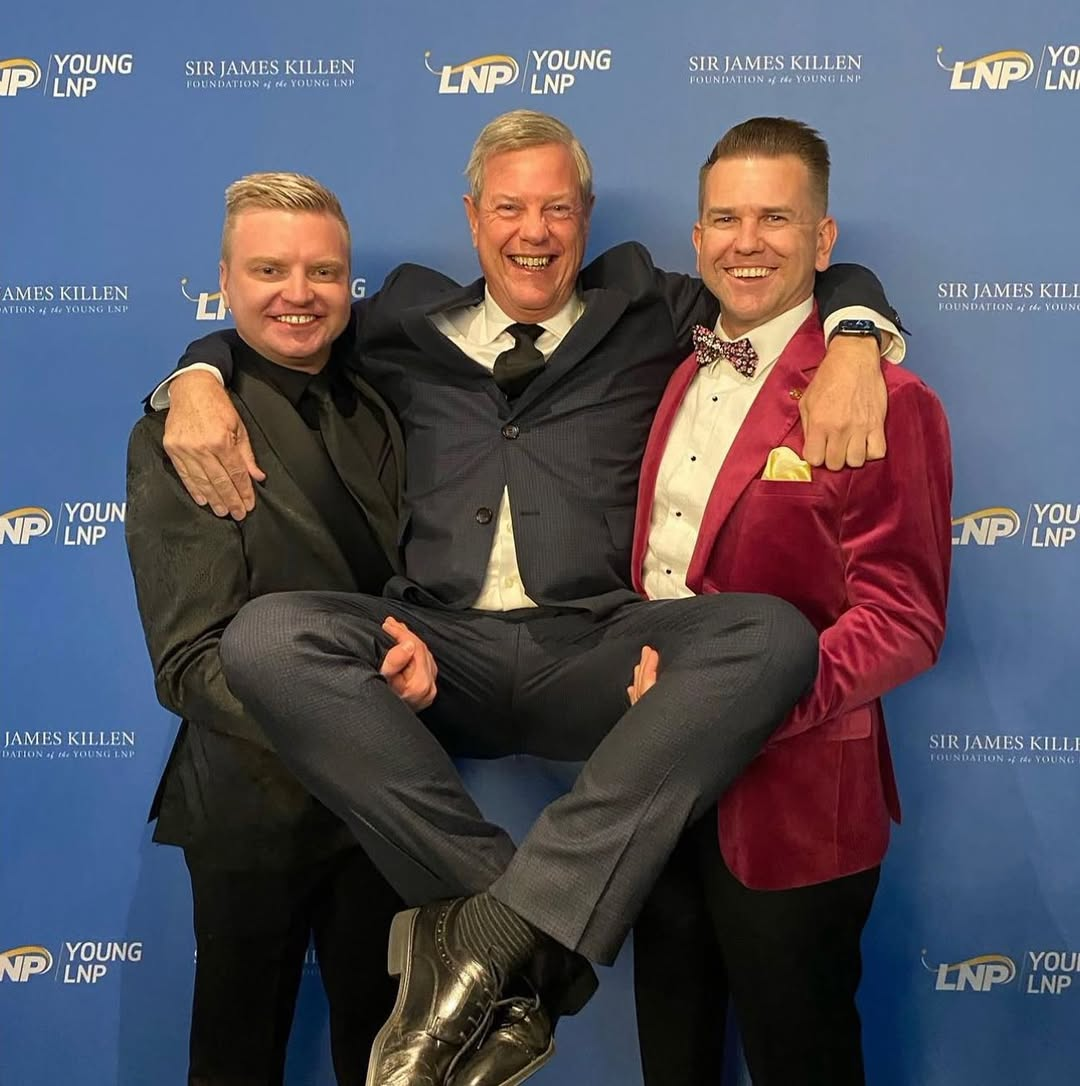
- Greg Thomson (left) with Tim Nicholls and Jarrod Bleijie at the Young LNP Gala 2023
- Occupation: Sports presenter
- Years active: 2007–present
- Known for: Journalism, TV presenting, Public meltdown

Greg "Greggo" Thomson is an Australian former journalist. Thomson was a sports presenter and reporter for Sky News Australia and Fox Sports News, until resigning in July 2018.

== Career ==
Thomson is originally from Brisbane and began his media career in 2007 at age 19, working for Southern Cross Austereo regional television stations, including Southern Cross Ten. Between 2010 and 2013, Thomson moved to Canberra becoming sports editor and presenter at WIN Television.

He moved to Melbourne in 2013 to join Sky News, remaining there for less than a year before becoming a freelance journalist. As a freelancer, Thomson worked for Seven News, Nine News and A Current Affair as well as radio station Triple M.

Thomson re-joined Sky News in Sydney in October 2015. He was initially sports presenter on Sunday Edition before becoming co-anchor of both Sunday Edition and Saturday Edition in 2018 and reports for sister station Fox Sports News.

== Public meltdown ==
In July 2018 Thomson was suspended from Sky News pending an internal investigation for abusing guests at a charity fundraiser in Sydney. He resigned a few days later.
