= Jigsaw (Australian game show) =

- Genre: Game show
- Presented by: Billy Raymond
- Country of origin: Australia
- Original language: English

Production
- Running time: 30 minutes

Original release
- Network: Australian Television Network
- Release: 15 February 1965 – 1965

Jigsaw is an Australian television series that aired 1965 on the Australian Television Network, which later became the Seven Network. Hosted by Billy Raymond, it was a daytime game show aired in a 30-minute time-slot. (Running time excluding commercials is not known. Though a prime-time series of the era could run 24–25 minutes, daytime series tended to run shorter). The series was produced in Sydney. It ran for 24 weeks, starting 15 February.
