= Weekend Edition (Australian TV program) =

Australian television series

- Genre: News, Current Affairs, Commentary
- Presented by: Greg Thomson (2016–2018); Jaynie Seal (2016–present)
- Country of origin: Australia
- Original language: English

Production
- Camera setup: Multi-camera
- Running time: 3 hours (inc. adverts)

Original release
- Network: News24
- Release: 9 July 2016 – present

Related
- Agenda

Weekend Edition is an Australian news and current affairs television program on News24 on Saturdays and Sundays. It is the weekend incarnation of First Edition.

== Saturday Edition ==
Saturday Edition is a weekly Australian news and current affairs television program on News24. It is hosted by Greg Thomson and Jaynie Seal.

The program was premiered on 9 July 2016 and runs from 7am to 10am (AEST) on Saturdays. It was originally planned to have the show break out for 30 minutes to allow Pyne & Marles to appear, but that program was moved to Friday afternoons after Saturday Edition began. The program replaces the bulk of First Edition as Sky News' breakfast program.

The program was hosted by Paul Murray, along with Paul Murray Live. Coinciding with the launch of Saturday Edition, the Friday episode of Paul Murray Live became a highlights package of scenes from the previous week. In 2016, Seal presented news updates and Jim Callinan presented sport.

In 2017, Caroline Marcus was added as aa co-host of the program and Thomson replaced Callinan as sports presenter, while Seal exited. From 4 March 2017, Seal and Thomson became main anchors of the program, with both Murray and Marcus exiting without notice. The pair also host Sunday Edition from 7am AEDT, but the program is 60 minutes in duration, prior to Speers on Sunday.

== Sunday Edition ==
Weekend Edition
- Genre: News, Current Affairs, Commentary
- Presented by: Peter van Onselen; Kristina Keneally (2017); Jaynie Seal; Greg Thomson
- Country of origin: Australia
- Original language: English

Production
- Camera setup: Multi-camera
- Running time: 2 hours (inc. adverts)

Original release
- Network: News24
- Release: 10 July 2016 – present

Sunday Edition (also known as Sunday Edition with Peter van Onselen) is a weekly Australian news and current affairs television program on News24.

The program was premiered on 10 July 2016 and runs from 7am to 10am (AEST) on Sunday mornings, breaking out for one hour at 8:30am AEST for Sunday Agenda. The program replaces the bulk of First Edition as Sky News' breakfast program on Sundays.

In its first season, the program was hosted by Peter van Onselen, and is one of four News24 formats he presents, alongside Sunday Agenda and his daytime programs PVO NewsDay and To The Point. Coinciding with the launch of Sunday Edition, the flagship Sunday morning talk show, Australian Agenda, was retitled as Sunday Agenda. Seal presents news updates and Thomson presents sport.

In 2017, Kristina Keneally was added as co-host of Sunday Edition. Keneally also co-hosted To The Point with van Onselen.
