= Hole in the Wall (Australian game show) =

Australian television game show

- Genre: Game show
- Presented by: Jules Lund
- Country of origin: Australia
- Original language: English
- No. of seasons: 1
- No. of episodes: 8

Production
- Production location: Melbourne Central City Studios
- Running time: 30 minutes (including commercials)

Original release
- Network: Nine Network
- Release: 6 August – 17 October 2008

Related
- Brain Wall

Hole in the Wall was an Australian television game show hosted by Jules Lund, based on the Japanese game show Brain Wall (also known as Human Tetris). In the show, contestants are required to fit though holes in a polystyrene wall that moves towards them.

Produced by FremantleMedia, the show began airing on the Nine Network from 6 August 2008.

== Format ==
The show follows a similar format as the British version, and uses the same music package.

Each episode features two teams consisting of three celebrity contestants, with each team competing for a charity. The contestants, fitted with hard hats and spandex, stand on a rectangular strip called the "Play Area" as a polystyrene wall moves towards them. The aim is to assume a position that will best allow their bodies to fit through a shape or a number of shapes cut into the wall. The wall measures 4 metres (13 ft) by 2.3 metres (7.5 ft) and travels along a 15 metres (49 ft) straight path that approaches at varying speeds. If contestants fail to fit through the hole, they are pushed back into a 1.5 metres (4.9 ft) deep pool of water behind them.

The game consists of four rounds plus a final round that decides the winner. The first round has three contestants on the strip. A point is awarded to each contestant who fits through the hole. The second round has two contestants. For two points to be awarded, both contestants must fit through the hole.

The third round is variable in the number of players and the scenario played, differing in each episode. For example, scenarios have included facing the wall blindfolded, being forced to rely on the studio audience to guide a contestant, and facing the wall with either a prop or a guest contestant. These guests have included members of the audience and Jules Lund himself. The fourth round sees all three contestants having to face a wall traveling at double speed. Five points are awarded if all contestants fit through the hole, but otherwise no points are scored.

The last round has the team with the most points being given the choice of either facing the wall or forcing the other team to do so. In the event of a tie, a coin toss determines which team has control. The winner is based on the success of the team that is chosen to face the wall. This brings up controversy since all the points accumulated are worth nothing and the winner of the last round wins the whole show.

The winning team at end of the show wins a trophy and AU$10,000 for their chosen charity.

== Catchphrase ==
- "It's time to face the wall!"

== Episodes ==
No.	Title	Original release date	Australian viewers (millions)
1	"Beauty and the Beasts"	6 August 2008	1.555
Beasts: Scott Cam (captain); Mark "Jacko" Jackson; Tim Smith; Beauties: Tottie Goldsmith (captain); Brodie Harper; Kelly Landry
2	"NRL vs AFL"	27 August 2008	1.188
NRL: Paul "Fatty" Vautin; Paul "Chief" Harragon; Matty Johns; AFL: Garry Lyon; James Brayshaw; Billy Brownless
3	"Battle of the Sexes"	3 September 2008	1.143
Guys: Richard Reid; Jason Dundas; Luke Jacobz; Girls: Giaan Rooney; Jaynie Seal; Bianca Dye
4	"Blondes vs Burnettes"		
Blondes: TBA; Burnettes: TBA
5	"Actors vs Reality"	17 September 2008	1.040
Actors: Ian Stenlake; Kate Kendall; Simon Westaway; Reality: Brodie Young; Sara-Marie Fedele; Zach Douglas
6	"Brains vs Brawn"	10 October 2008	
TV Stars: TBA; Radio Stars: TBA
7	"Couch Potatoes vs Sports Stars"		
Couch Potatoes: TBA; Sports Stars: TBA
8	"TV vs Radio Stars"	10 September 2008	1.145
TV Stars: Ed Phillips (Captain); Tim Campbell; Shelley Craft; Radio Stars: Mike "Fitzy" Fitzpatrick; "Labrat" Jason Hawkins; Steve Bedwell

== Production ==
=== Casting ===
The search for a host for Hole in the Wall was tough for producers, with a late withdrawal of the hosting job meaning another search had to be made in the last weeks before recordings began. Quite a number of personalities had auditioned for the hosting role, including Colin Lane, Jason Dundas, Jules Lund, Shura Taft and Dan O'Connor. It was believed that Shura Taft had landed the job when he was in the hosting role for early recordings of the show. Taft was in fact a stand-in host for early production shoots to trial the shows' format while producers were still finding a suitable host. Lund was eventually named as the host, several weeks after actual recordings were scheduled to start.

=== Filming ===
Hole in the Wall began recording episodes in mid-May 2008, after being delayed from late April 2008 at Melbourne Central City Studios at the Docklands. The pre-show buzz was highlighted when bigger studio audiences than anticipated turned up at the first shoots and some had to be turned away. The later episodes' audience numbers were adjusted to cater for the overwhelming demand.
