= Pot Luck (TV series) =

Television series

- Genre: Talent
- Presented by: Ernie Sigley
- Judges: Bernard King
- Country of origin: Australia
- Original language: English
- No. of seasons: 1

Production
- Running time: 60 minutes

Original release
- Network: Network Ten

Related
- Pot of Gold

Pot Luck was an Australian talent television series aired on Network Ten in 1987. It was hosted by Ernie Sigley.
