= Rob Gell =

Australian meteorologist

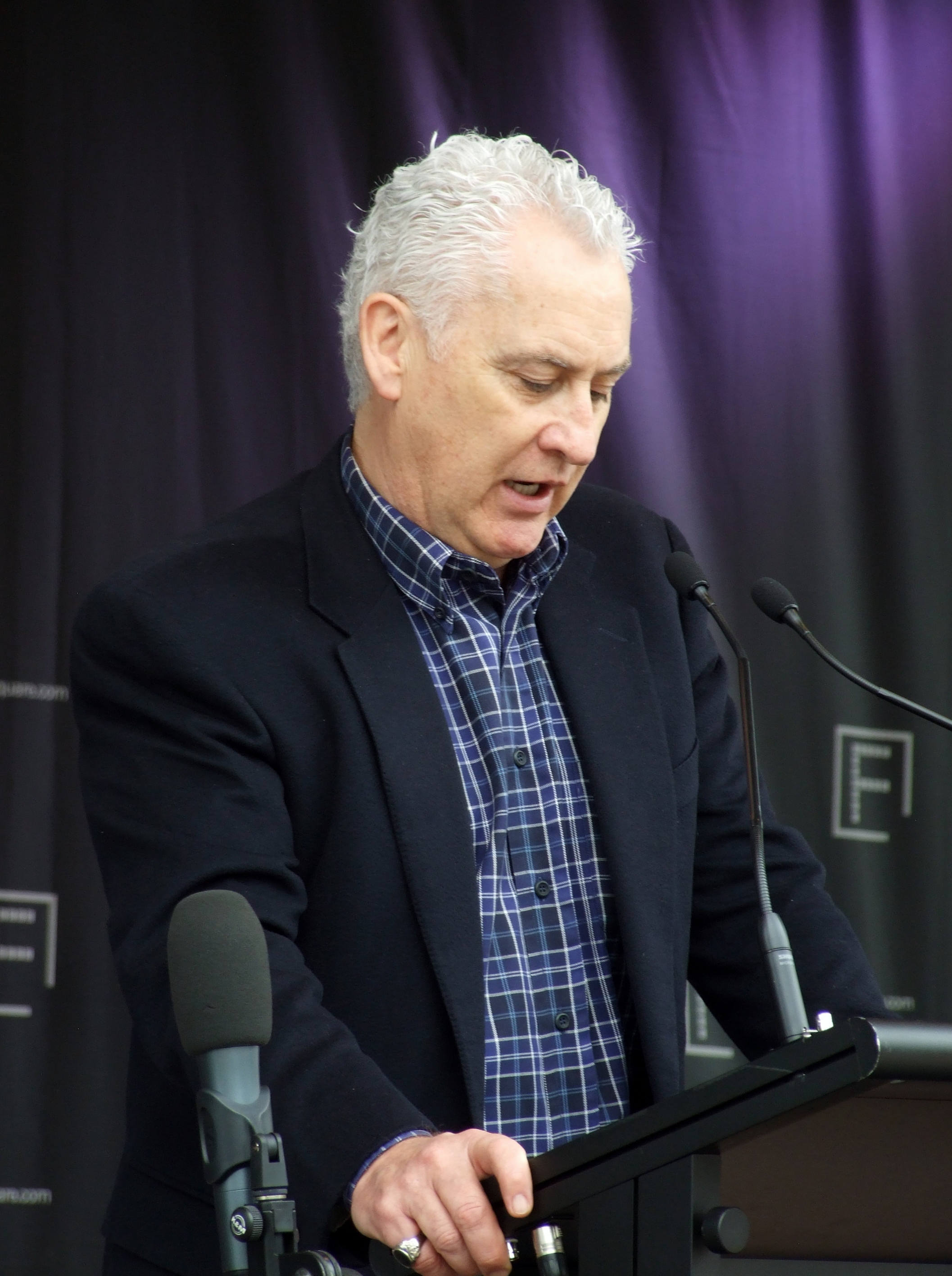
Rob Gell addressing the 2012 U3A Carnival of Learning at Federation Square, Melbourne.

Rob Gell AM is a geomorphologist and weather presenter, with a degree in meteorology. Gell attended Camberwell Grammar School as a student in the 1960s.

Gell has been a weather presenter for National Nine News and later Seven News. He was one of the few Australian weather presenters on free-to-air television with a degree in science, along with David Brown and Magdalena Roze.

He became President of the Royal Society of Victoria in 2021.

== Career ==
Gell, who attended Koonung Secondary College, is a trained coastal geomorphologist and geography teacher. He began his television career in 1979, moving from Melbourne University to work with Ten News. Moving to the Nine Network in 1988, Gell was innovative as a designer and producer of television weather presentations for 15 years until 2003, when he was replaced by Livinia Nixon.

In 2004, Gell was approached by the Seven Network to become the weekend weather presenter on Seven News Melbourne.

Gell is a fellow of the Royal Geographical Society. He is also a passionate environmental campaigner and supporter of the Melbourne Football Club. In 1996, Gell became the first Patron of the Geography Teachers' Association of Victoria, for which he takes an active role in lobbying and chairing conferences and forums.

Gell is also the co-founder of the ICES Green College (International College of Environmental Sustainability) headquartered in Melbourne. The ICES delivers many sustainability qualifications, including the Certificate of Sustainable Business Practices.

From 2021, Gell commenced his term as President of the Royal Society of Victoria.
