= The Golden Show =

- Genre: Variety
- Presented by: Billy Raymond
- Country of origin: Australia
- Original language: English

Original release
- Network: Australian Television Network
- Release: 3 February – 27 April 1964

The Golden Show is an Australian television series which aired in 1964 on the Australian Television Network, which later became the Seven Network.

Hosted by Billy Raymond, the daytime series featuring interviews, a talent segment, and an audience sing-along. The series was produced in Sydney.
