= All-Star Squares =

- Genre: Game Show
- Based on: Hollywood Squares by: Merrill Heatter; Bob Quigley
- Presented by: Ian Rogerson
- Narrated by: Gavin Wood
- Country of origin: Australia
- Original language: English
- No. of seasons: 1

Production
- Production locations: South Melbourne, Victoria
- Running time: 30 minutes

Original release
- Network: Seven Network
- Release: 12 April – 3 September 1999

All-Star Squares is the Australian adaption of the American game show Hollywood Squares that aired on the Seven Network in 1999, hosted by Ian 'Danno' Rogerson. Like the American version, the object of the game was to get three stars in a row, either across, up-and-down or diagonally. The contestant in turn, chose a celebrity, to whom host Rogerson asked a question. After (usually) a joke answer, they gave a response, to which the contestant either agreed or disagreed. If correct in their judgement, they received their mark in that box; if wrong, their opponent got the square (unless it led to three in a row, in which case that player had to earn it him/herself).

Each of the first two games scored $250, the third game scored $500 and each game thereafter scored $1,000. The second game featured a "secret square" which awarded a special prize to the first player to choose that square and correctly judge the celebrity's answer. If neither player found that celebrity, the "secret square" would be moved to another celebrity in the next game. If time expired during a game, each player scored $250 per square. If the match ended in a tie, the winner of the most games decided who chose a square for the $250 tie-breaker. The player with the most cash kept their winnings and chose a celebrity, each of whom held an envelope concealing a card with the description of a major prize which the champion would win by correctly judging that celebrity's answer. Win or lose, the carryover champion returned on the following show to face another opponent.

== Previous versions ==
Prior to this there were two other versions that aired from the 1960s to the mid-1980s. Personality Squares originally aired on Network Ten from 1967 hosted by John Bailey, followed by Joe Martin then Bob Moore and ran until 1969. It was revived as Celebrity Squares on the Nine Network hosted by Jimmy Hannan from 1975 to 1976. The format was revived again in 1981 but the Personality Squares name was reused with Jimmy Hannan as host on Network Ten, which now owns format rights through Paramount's ownership. (King World acquired the format in 1991, which Paramount acquired in 2000.)
