= Battle of the Sexes (radio contest) =

Radio quiz

The Battle of the Sexes is a game where male and female contestants challenge each other on trivia questions. The principle of the game is to demonstrate the imbalance between male and female genders as they compete. The concept was created by Perth radio announcer Paul Redman.

== History ==
The game initially began as a regular call-in radio contest, whereby one male and one female contestant would compete answering trivia questions. A leaderboard by gender was kept from day-to-day. The concept spread to Austereo's affiliated radio stations across Australia, including FOX FM's Tracy Bartram and Matt Tilley. The segment became a daily staple of the 2Day FM Morning Crew with Wendy Harmer.

In 1998, the concept was adapted into a short-lived television show on Network Ten hosted by Ed Phillips. It only lasted for two series with the girls winning them both (25–24 and 25–21). The number of episodes depended on the number of wins it took to 25.

The concept lives on in radio, as well as in a series of board games which allow the game to be played at home. It has also been adopted by MTV, uniting cast members from The Real World and Road Rules for a chance at money.
