= Split Personality (game show) =

Australian television series

- Genre: Game show
- Presented by: Terry Dear
- Country of origin: Australia
- Original language: English

Production
- Production company: Reg Grundy Productions

Original release
- Network: 0-10 Network
- Release: 1967 – 1967

Split Personality was an Australian television series which aired in 1967. A game show, it was hosted by Terry Dear and aired on the 0-10 Network (now Network Ten). An article in the 21 January 1967 edition of Sydney Morning Herald suggests the format was based on identifying famous people based on their hair, eyes and lips.

The series did not last long. Produced by Reg Grundy Productions, the archival status of the show is not known, and it is possible the series was wiped. It is listed in old TV schedules as airing at 7:00PM on Fridays.

== See also ==
- Leave It to the Girls - 1957 TV series with Terry Dear
