= The Tommy Hanlon Show =

- Genre: Game show
- Presented by: Tommy Hanlon Jr.
- Country of origin: Australia
- Original language: English

Production
- Running time: 30 minutes

Original release
- Network: Nine Network
- Release: 1967 – 1968

The Tommy Hanlon Show is an Australian television series which aired 1967 to 1968 on the Nine Network. It was a game show similar to Let's Make a Deal, and aired in a daytime half-hour time-slot. As the title suggests, it was hosted by Tommy Hanlon Jr., an American who found popularity with Australian viewers during the 1960s.

== Episode status ==
The exact archival status of the show is not known, given the wiping of the era. Two episodes are held by the National Film and Sound Archive, a nighttime edition and a daytime edition with Mike Dyer hosting as Hanlon was in hospital.
