= Take a Letter (Australian game show) =

Australian television series

- Genre: Game show
- Presented by: Jimmy Hannan

Original release
- Network: 0-10 Network
- Release: 1967

Take a Letter is an Australian television game show which aired 1967 on the 0-10 Network (now Network Ten). It aired Mondays to Fridays in a daytime time-slot and was hosted by Jimmy Hannan. A word game based on Scrabble, it was produced in Melbourne.

== Reception ==
Sydney Morning Herald said of the series "it is a fairly harmless and moderately entertaining piece of nonsense.
