= C'mon, Have A Go! =

Australian television game show (1985–1986)

- Created by: Sandy Scott
- Presented by: Tony Young
- Country of origin: Australia

Production
- Running time: 30 minutes

Original release
- Network: Seven Network
- Release: 1985 – 1986

C'mon, Have A Go! is an Australian television game show broadcast on the Seven Network in 1985 and 1986. The show was hosted by Tony Young.

Contestants were drawn from the studio audience and encouraged to participate in games outside their declared area of expertise – using the show's title as a chanted catchphrase. Young would subject incorrect answers to a good-natured ribbing, drawing on his talents as a stand-up comedian.

When creator and lead producer Sandy Scott left to work on a revival of the Family Feud format for Seven, the network dropped a planned third season of C'mon from its 1987 lineup. Tony Young resumed a radio career in his native Adelaide. Since 1995 he has worked as a media consultant.

== Sources ==
- Mars, Damian (16 March 1996). "Restless Young". Good Weekend. pp. 18–22.
- "C'mon, Have A Go!". Where Are They Now?. Season 2. Episode 4. 27 May 2007.
