= Bankstown-Auburn Community Radio =

Coordinates: 33°57′00″S 151°01′49″E

Connect FM 100.9 – Formerly 2BACR
- Bankstown, New South Wales; Australia
- Branding: Bankstown–Auburn Community Radio

Programming
- Format: Community radio

History
- Former call signs: 2BACR 100.9 FM
- Call sign meaning: Connecting the Community

Links
- Website: www.connectfm.au

Bankstown–Auburn Community Radio Inc (ACMA call sign CONNECT FM 100.9) is a community radio station broadcasting on 100.9 FM from Padstow, New South Wales. The licensed broadcast area covers Silverwater to Picnic Point, Villawood to Mount Lewis in Sydney, New South Wales. Programs are produced for the local community and include sports, music, talk back and local news.

== History ==
=== As 2BCR/2BACR/CONNECT FM 100.9 ===
The Bankstown City Radio Co-operative was one of the first groups to receive a community radio broadcasting licence. Awarded the licence in 1983, the station began broadcasting as 2BCR from studios in a building at the former site of Georges Hall Public School in Birdwood Avenue, Georges Hall. Its programming included music and community interest programmes including weekend sports shows, youth-oriented request programmes, religious programming and for many years hosted a weekly police round-up. In the mid-1990s, the station had a media booth at Belmore Oval to enable live broadcasts of home games by the Bulldogs rugby league team. A mobile studio allowed the station to broadcast from local events. Brendan "Jonesy" Jones got his start at 2BCR, when it was at Georges Hall. He famously got his father's car bogged on the oval after his shift "Jazz beat". Jones now works on Breakfast radio as the Jonesy part of Jonesy and Amanda on WSFM.

In 1999 BFM moved to new permanent studios at 104 Cahors Road, Padstow. By the early 2000s, the station's focus had shifted to community language programming almost exclusively. On 21 June 2007 the Australian Communications and Media Authority announced that it would not be renewing BFM's community radio broadcasting licence when it expired in July. The reason stated was:

"Most of the licensee's members are from communities outside of the licence area and a significant proportion of its programmes are directed at communities that are largely resident outside the licence area."

The station was then required to apply for a temporary licence to start from the day the previous licence expired.

Connect FM 100.9 - Bankstown Auburn Community Radio Incorporated now hold the licence, and has done since 2011 serving the local community. The station is active in the community providing live broadcasts from events such as ANZAC/Remembrance Day services, community events. Their mission statement is "Connecting the local Community". Programs are produced and presented by locals for the local community, and include more than 8 languages for the CALD community.

=== As a TCBL ===
Three operators shared the 100.9FM frequency between January 2008 and November 2011. They were BACR, a sub-group of the incumbent; CAMS RADIO FLAME FM and BSACR.

On 15 November 2011, 2BACR - Bankstown Auburn Community Radio Incorporated (Connect FM 100.9) was awarded the licence to broadcast a community radio service to Bankstown. The licence was successfully renewed by the current group in October 2021 and again in 2026 meeting the stringent ACMA criteria of providing quality broadcasting of programs to the RA1 licenced area. In May 2022, the on-air identifier (call sign) was changed from 2BACR 100.9 FM to Connect FM 100.9 FM, with ACMA. Visit connectfm.au for more information on the station including the latest programs and listening on demand. Connect FM 100.9 - Bankstown Auburn Community Radio can be followed on social media platforms such as Facebook and Instagram.
