= Tommy Hanlon Jr. =

Australian actor, comedian and musician

- Born: Tommy Gene Thomason; 14 August 1923; Parkersburg, West Virginia, United States
- Died: 11 October 2003 (aged 80); Melbourne, Victoria, Australia
- Occupations: Actor; comedian; magician; television host; ringmaster
- Years active: 1927–2001
- Spouses: Jean Gregory; Muriel
- Children: Tommy Hanlon Thomason, April Thomason
- Parent(s): Homer Emmons Thomason, Ruth Dorothy Manning

Tommy Hanlon Jr. (14 August 1923 – 11 October 2003) was an American-born actor, comedian, magician, television host and circus ringmaster. He was notable for his career in Australia after emigrating there in 1959, where he became a Gold Logie-award-winning media personality in 1962. Hanlon was notable for his early television appearances on daytime television and as a host of the Australian version of United States game show It Could Be You.

== Biography ==
=== Early life ===
He was born Tommy Gene Thomason in Parkersburg, West Virginia in 1923, to vaudeville performers Homer Emmons Thomason (whose stage name was "Tommy Hanlon") and Ruth Dorothy Manning. He appeared in his parents' act at the age of four, and later took the stage name Tommy Hanlon Jr. after his father's stage name.

=== Professional career ===
Hanlon first appeared on his own as a magician as a teenager and was an entertainer for the rest of his life. As chief stage assistant, he collaborated with Orson Welles in The Mercury Wonder Show (1943) and the 1944 film Follow the Boys. After appearing on stage with W. C. Fields, Hanlon came to Australia in 1959, first as a club act, then appearing on television.

Hanlon became a major TV celebrity in Australia in the early 1960s, especially as host of the popular daytime program "It Could Be You" on the Nine Network, operating out of the GTV-9 studios in Melbourne. The program was a mixture of game show, human interest and humour. It featured tearful reunions of long separated families or friends. He typically closed each program sitting on a stool with a social commentary presented as a Letter from Mom.

After GTV-9 purchased radio station 3AK in April 1961, all GTV-9 personalities were expected to present programs on the new acquisition. Hanlon hosted a Saturday morning show with Jack Little as his sidekick.

=== Awards ===
Award	Association	Year	Work	Result
Gold Logie	Logie Awards	1962		Won
Special Award	Logie Awards	1963	It Could Be You	Won

He won two Logie awards, including the Gold Logie in 1962, opposite Australian entertainer Lorrae Desmond, and became one of the highest-paid entertainers in Australia.

=== Circus career ===
In 1967, he bought into Ashton's Circus. In the 1970s, he hosted talent show Pot of Gold, with resident judge Bernard King who mocked most entrants mercilessly, to the consternation of the more kind-hearted Hanlon. Hanlon quit television in 1978 and toured Australia as a ringmaster with Silvers Circus.

=== Personal life ===
He was honoured in an episode of This is Your Life filmed in August 2003.

Hanlon died from cancer in Melbourne on 11 October 2003, only weeks after suffering a heart attack. He was predeceased by his wife, Muriel (whom he always called Murphy), and survived by his daughter April Bell from that marriage and her son Jeff Almond. He was also survived by his first wife, Jean Gregory, his son by that marriage, Tommy Hanlon Thomason, three grandchildren and two great-grandchildren.

Despite his love for Australia, he never relinquished his United States citizenship.
