= Visquiz =

Australian quiz series (1985-86)

- Genre: Quiz show
- Created by: Peter Benardos
- Directed by: Peter Benardos
- Presented by: Mark Bonelli
- Country of origin: Australia
- Original language: English
- No. of seasons: 1
- No. of episodes: 26

Production
- Producer: Peter Benardos
- Running time: 30 minutes

Original release
- Network: SBS
- Release: 16 August 1985 – 14 February 1986

Visquiz is an Australian television quiz show hosted by Mark Bonelli and first broadcast on SBS in 1985–86. Each episode features three contestants who are Year 11 students with multicultural backgrounds drawn from schools around Australia. Questions are on current events and general knowledge and are answered on a computer. The show featured a computer character called Go To but in early episodes it was difficult to understand. Prizes included computers, encyclopedias and atlases.

== Reception ==
Commenting on the first episode Geraldine Walsh from the Sydney Morning Herald writes "Visquiz is a clever idea and, with trimming and general smartening up, could improve out of sight." The Age's Marie McNamara Says "The first episode just does not measure up.
