= Noughts and Crosses (game show) =

- Genre: Game show
- Presented by: Geoff Raymond; Danny Webb
- Country of origin: Australia
- Original language: English

Production
- Running time: 30 minutes

Original release
- Network: HSV-7
- Release: 1957 – 1960

Noughts and Crosses is an Australian television game show which aired live on Sundays from 1957 to 1960 on Melbourne station HSV-7. The half-hour series was hosted by Geoff Raymond, though Danny Webb hosted four episodes in 1960. Archival status of this game show is unknown.

== Gameplay ==
The format was described in the 2 July 1959 issue of The Age: "Contestants are asked to choose subjects on which they are asked questions. Their answers provide the moves to the noughts and crosses board."
