= It Could Be You (Australian game show) =

Australian television series

- Genre: Game show
- Presented by: Tommy Hanlon Jr.
- Country of origin: Australia
- Original language: English

Original release
- Network: GTV-9
- Release: 1961 – 1966

It Could Be You is an Australian daytime television series which aired from 1961 to 1966, with later revivals. The best known version was the first version, which was hosted by Tommy Hanlon Jr., assisted by Jack Little. Hanlon was among several Americans who had shows on 1960s Australian television, the others included Delo and Daly, Larry K. Nixon, and Don Lane.

Broadcast originally on Melbourne station GTV-9, it eventually become a Nine Network show.

While considered a game show, it was not a strict quiz format. The unusual format (often involving reunions with long-lost relatives) was popular with female viewers.

The running time of the episodes is not known (Australian prime-time series typically ran 23–25 minutes during the 1960s, but daytime series could sometimes run shorter).

The series was still popular when it ended, with Hanlon hosting a new show called The Tommy Hanlon Show.

It was revived in 1969 with Tim Evans as host, with an additional revival in the 1980s co-hosted by Barry Crocker and Tony Porter.

== Episode status ==
During the 1960s game shows were often wiped, not just in Australia but also in several other countries. Despite this, several episodes of the series (both the original and the Evans-hosted revival) are held by the National Film and Sound Archive.
