= Bernard King (television) =

Australian stage actor, celebrity chef, and television personality

- Born: Bernard James King; 25 March 1934; Maleny, Queensland, Australia
- Died: 20 December 2002 (aged 68); Gold Coast, Queensland, Australia
- Occupations: Celebrity chef; television personality; actor; TV judge; businessman

Bernard James King (25 March 1934 – 20 December 2002) was an Australian stage actor, celebrity chef, and television personality.

== Early life ==
King was born into a farming family in Maleny, Queensland. He attended a Christian Brothers College in Nudgee on a scholarship. After his graduation he became a school teacher.

== Acting career ==
King entered his first talent competition at age eight. He also participated in a World War II fund-raising effort, Smokes for Six Soldiers. While attending college he gained a reputation as a keen student and a powerful debater.

Even though he was working full-time as a teacher after graduation, he found time to participate in amateur theatre productions and variety shows. Part-time work on ABC Radio eventually became sufficient to allow him to give up the teaching post.

His career as a chef began almost accidentally, due to a party he hosted for English actress Vivien Leigh and the Stratford on Avon Theatre Company. The dinner, for 50 people, was at his small apartment in Brisbane. One of the attendees was Maureen Kissell, host of ABC's program A Woman's World; she was so impressed that she invited him to present a cooking demonstration on her show in Sydney.

Another party at his residence, attended by Good Morning Australia hostess Del Cartwright, resulted in an invitation to demonstrate his prowess on that program. That soon became a regular part of the program, and then a separate 30-minute program, King's Kitchen.

He became a judge on the daytime TV talent show Pot of Gold, then Pot Luck, and New Faces. He soon gained a reputation as an acerbic judge. King took pride in steering the talentless away from show business. He would frequently give a contestant very low scores, such as two out of ten, and would at times simply give them zero.

King pioneered television advertorials, demonstrating the use of sponsor-supplied products. He mounted a cabaret show at Sydney's Roxy Revue Theatre-Restaurant, which ran for seven years.

By 1982 King had become an industry, earning five million dollars from lucrative sponsorship deals, licensing arrangements, a signature range of herbs and spices and wide-ranging media commitments.. During the late 1990s he made public appearances in shopping centres, television programs and other public locations to host cooking demonstrations. These appearances were made alongside two well built and scantily clad male assistants dubbed by Kerri-Anne Kennerley as The Bernardettes (Craig Bonney and Ian Burn).

== Personal life ==
King was homosexual and had many lovers. His biographer, Stephanie Clifford-Smith, says "Fidelity wasn't top of his list". His partner of thirteen years was Alan Marshall. One of his best known platonic friendships was with song and dance man Sammy Davis Jr.

In later years, King struggled with his finances. He mortgaged his house to fund a second season at the troubled Parramatta Riverside Theatres. The season was a flop, and the house was lost.

King died mid-morning on 20 December 2002 in the garden of a house where he was living rent-free in exchange for gardening duties on the Gold Coast, Queensland. He had an angina attack and blacked out, causing him to fall from the upper terrace 10 metres (33 ft) to the driveway. He was 68 years old.

== Legacy ==
Interview tapes recorded by King's biographer, Stephanie Clifford-Smith, were acquired by State Library of Queensland in 2016.
