= Jimmy Hannan =

Australian television presenter (1934–2019)

- Born: 25 August 1937; Surry Hills, New South Wales, Australia
- Died: 7 January 2019 (aged 84); Bellingen, New South Wales Australia
- Occupations: Television personality; radio personality; singer; entertainer; variety and game show host
- Years active: 1956−1984
- Children: Mark Hannan, Melissa Hannan, Vanessa Hannan, Emily Gillman
- Awards: Gold Logie (1965)

Jimmy Hannan (25 August 1937 – 7 January 2019) was an Australian radio and television personality, variety show host, singer, entertainer and game show host of the 1960s and 1970s. One of the pioneers of television, he appeared regularly on variety show In Melbourne Tonight, and later hosted his own musical variety show Jimmy, later called Tonight with Jimmy Hannan. Hannan hosted music show Saturday Date from 1963 until 1967, which featured such performers as Billy Thorpe and Olivia Newton-John. He won the 1965 Gold Logie award for most popular personality on Australian television.

== Early life and career ==
Hannan had his start musically performing in a big-band. As a teen idol, he often performed with people such as Johnny Devlin and Little Pattie. He released the single "Beach Ball", originally recorded by the City Surfers, in 1963. The song was written by Roger McGuinn who went on to become a member of the Byrds. The single reached number No. 2 on the local charts and featured the Bee Gees as backing vocalists. He worked on radio in Melbourne at 3UZ and at 2GB Sydney. He hosted game shows including Name That Tune and Celebrity Squares.

=== Personal life ===
Hannan was married to Joanne Goode and had four children, including actress and model Melissa Hannan who won the Miss Australia title in 1981 and was also in the Miss World competition held in London. He left the show business industry in 1984, Hannan died on 7 January 2019, aged 84, from cancer in Bellingen, New South Wales.

== Filmography ==
Year	Title	Role
1956	Name That Tune (TV series)	
1962	Say When!! (TV series)	Host
1966	Jimmy (TV music variety show) (also later known as Tonight with Jimmy Hannan)	Host
1967	The Go!! Show (TV music series)	
1967	Take a Letter (TV series)	
1969	The Johnny Farnham special (TV special)	Host
1970	In Melbourne Tonight (TV series)	Host
1963-1970	Bandstand (TV series)	Singer
1971	The 13th annual TV Week Logie Awards	Himself- presenter
1971	Spending Spree (TV series)	Host
1972	Matt Flinders (TV series)	Host
1972	Split Second (TV series)	Host
1974	Ted Hamiltons Musical World (TV series)	Himself
1974	The Ernie Sigley Show (TV series)	Himself
1972-1975	The Graham Kennedy Show (TV series)	Himself
1975	Something Special (TV series)	Himself
1975-1976	Celebrity Squares (TV series)	Host
1978	Micro Macro (TV special)	Himself
1979	The Magic of Cole Porter Special (TV special)	
1981	Search for a Star (TV series)	Host

== Actor ==
Year	Title	Role
1976	The Sentimental Bloke (TV movie)	Ginger Mick

== Soundtrack ==
Year	Title	
1970	In Melbournre Tonight (see above)	1 episode (14 May) - Performer -"Soon It's Gonna Rain -The "In" Crowd"
1974	The Ernie Sigley Show (see above)	4 episodes - Performer -"The Greatest Show on Earth" -"Watching Scotty Grow" -"Song Sung Blue", "Cracklin' Rose" -"Name"
1972-1975	"The Graham Kennedy Show" (TV series)	10 episodes - Performer -"Once in a Lifetime" -"If You Go Away (Ne me quitte pas)" -"Cabaret" -"(I Don't Know Why) But I Do" -"Personality" -"Get Down" -"And I Love You So" -"Welcome Home". "Country Boy" -"You've Lost That Lovin' Feelin'" -"Beer Barrel Polka"

== Discography ==
=== EPs ===
List of EPs
Title	Album details
Jimmy Hannan Sings	Released: 1963; Format: LP; Label: Reg Grundy (RGX-10,694)
Hokey Pokey Stomp And Beach Ball	Released: 1964; Format: LP; Label: Reg Grundy (RGX-10,829)
It's a Cotton Candy World	Released: 1965; Format: LP; Label: Reg Grundy (RGX-10,992)
Jimmy Hannan	Released: 1973; Format: LP; Label: Fable (FBEP-167)

=== Singles ===
List of singles, with selected chart positions
Year	Title	Peak chart positions
Year	Title	AUS
1963	"Beach Ball"/"You Gotta Have Love"	-
1964	"Little Latin Lupe Lu"/"You Guessed It"	-
1964	"Hokey Pokey Stomp"/"You Make Me Happy"	50
1964	"It's a Cotton Candy World"/"Come Out Dancin'"	-
1965	"See That Girl"/"In My Imagination"	-
1966	"Gloria"/"Young"	-
1968	"The Lady Came from Baltimore"/"You Can't Do That"	-
1970	"Curly"/"Sheila Anne"	49
1970	"Thanks"/"Anything Could Happen"	-
1971	"Money Money"/"Little Girl"	-
1972	"May Each Day"/"Together Forever"	-
1975	"Chang the Magic Dragon"	49
1975	"Sail Away"/"Wooden Heart"	-
1979	"Crazy Signs"/"Bon Appetit"	-
