= Electoral results for the Division of Mackellar =

Australian division election results

This is a list of electoral results for the Division of Mackellar in Australian federal elections from the division's creation in 1949 until the present.

== Members ==
Member	Party	Term
Bill Wentworth	Liberal	1949–1977
Bill Wentworth	Independent	1977–1977
Jim Carlton	Liberal	1977–1994
Bronwyn Bishop	Liberal	1994–2016
Jason Falinski	Liberal	2016–2022
Sophie Scamps	Independent	2022–present

== Election results ==
=== Elections in the 2020s ===
==== 2025 ====
2025 Australian federal election: Mackellar
Party	Candidate	Votes	%	±%
Independent	Lisa Cotten			
One Nation	Brad Hayman			
Greens	Ethan Hrnjak			
Libertarian	Justin Addison			
Trumpet of Patriots	Amber Robertson			
Liberal	James Brown			
Independent	Mandeep Singh			
Independent	Sophie Scamps			
Labor	Jeffery Quinn			
Total formal votes				
Informal votes				
Turnout				

==== 2022 ====
2022 Australian federal election: Mackellar
Party	Candidate	Votes	%	±%
Liberal	Jason Falinski	40,993	41.41	−11.60
Independent	Sophie Scamps	37,724	38.11	+38.11
Labor	Paula Goodman	8,162	8.25	−8.69
Greens	Ethan Hrnjak	6,032	6.09	−5.39
United Australia	Christopher Ball	2,881	2.91	+0.55
One Nation	Darren Dickson	2,624	2.65	+2.65
TNL	Barry Steele	575	0.58	+0.58
Total formal votes		98,991	96.22	+0.93
Informal votes		3,884	3.78	−0.93
Turnout		102,875	92.54	−0.51
Notional two-party-preferred count
Liberal	Jason Falinski	58,012	58.60	−4.62
Labor	Paula Goodman	40,979	41.40	+4.62
Two-candidate-preferred result
Independent	Sophie Scamps	51,973	52.50	+52.50
Liberal	Jason Falinski	47,018	47.50	−15.73
Independent gain from Liberal				

Alluvial diagram for preference flows in the seat of Mackellar in the 2022 federal election. indicates at what stage the winning candidate had over 50% of the votes and was declared the winner.

=== Elections in the 2010s ===
==== 2019 ====
2019 Australian federal election: Mackellar
Party	Candidate	Votes	%	±%
Liberal	Jason Falinski	52,088	53.01	+1.84
Labor	Declan Steele	16,648	16.94	−0.38
Independent	Alice Thompson	11,975	12.19	+12.19
Greens	Pru Wawn	11,283	11.48	−2.57
Sustainable Australia	Suzanne Daly	2,550	2.60	+2.60
United Australia	David Lyon	2,317	2.36	+2.36
Christian Democrats	Greg Levett	1,401	1.43	−1.13
Total formal votes		98,262	95.29	+0.55
Informal votes		4,857	4.71	−0.55
Turnout		103,119	93.05	+1.39
Two-party-preferred result
Liberal	Jason Falinski	62,124	63.22	−2.52
Labor	Declan Steele	36,138	36.78	+2.52
Liberal hold		Swing	−2.52	

==== 2016 ====
2016 Australian federal election: Mackellar
Party	Candidate	Votes	%	±%
Liberal	Jason Falinski	48,103	51.17	−11.26
Labor	Rhonda Funnell	16,286	17.32	+0.08
Greens	Mike Hall	13,204	14.05	−0.14
Independent	Jim Ball	6,797	7.23	+7.23
Independent	Julie Hegarty	4,542	4.83	+4.83
Independent	Liam Gavin	2,669	2.84	+2.84
Christian Democrats	Annie Wright	2,411	2.56	+0.58
Total formal votes		94,012	94.74	+0.49
Informal votes		5,223	5.26	−0.49
Turnout		99,235	91.66	−1.94
Two-party-preferred result
Liberal	Jason Falinski	61,800	65.74	−3.10
Labor	Rhonda Funnell	32,212	34.26	+3.10
Liberal hold		Swing	−3.10	

==== 2013 ====
2013 Australian federal election: Mackellar
Party	Candidate	Votes	%	±%
Liberal	Bronwyn Bishop	56,521	62.43	+0.31
Labor	Chris Hedge	15,606	17.24	−3.86
Greens	Jonathan King	12,843	14.19	−2.58
Palmer United	Debra Drummond	3,771	4.17	+4.17
Christian Democrats	Silvana Nero	1,791	1.98	+1.98
Total formal votes		90,532	94.25	−0.55
Informal votes		5,525	5.75	+0.55
Turnout		96,057	93.40	+0.14
Two-party-preferred result
Liberal	Bronwyn Bishop	62,322	68.84	+3.12
Labor	Chris Hedge	28,210	31.16	−3.12
Liberal hold		Swing	+3.12	

==== 2010 ====
2010 Australian federal election: Mackellar
Party	Candidate	Votes	%	±%
Liberal	Bronwyn Bishop	54,110	62.12	+5.74
Labor	Linda Beattie	18,381	21.10	−3.33
Greens	Jonathan King	14,609	16.77	+5.08
Total formal votes		87,100	94.80	−0.53
Informal votes		4,780	5.20	+0.53
Turnout		91,880	93.23	−2.05
Two-party-preferred result
Liberal	Bronwyn Bishop	57,245	65.72	+3.34
Labor	Linda Beattie	29,855	34.28	−3.34
Liberal hold		Swing	+3.34	

=== Elections in the 2000s ===
==== 2007 ====
2007 Australian federal election: Mackellar
Party	Candidate	Votes	%	±%
Liberal	Bronwyn Bishop	47,343	56.41	−0.62
Labor	Chris Sharpe	20,439	24.35	+4.24
Greens	Craige McWhirter	9,840	11.72	+1.19
Christian Democrats	Mike Hubbard	1,955	2.33	+2.33
Climate Change	John Adams	1,772	2.11	+2.11
Independent	Matt McLellan	1,651	1.97	+1.97
Democrats	Clinton Barnes	933	1.11	−0.29
Total formal votes		83,933	95.29	+0.11
Informal votes		4,150	4.71	−0.11
Turnout		88,083	95.32	+1.86
Two-party-preferred result
Liberal	Bronwyn Bishop	52,395	62.42	−3.04
Labor	Chris Sharpe	31,538	37.58	+3.04
Liberal hold		Swing	−3.04	

==== 2004 ====
2004 Australian federal election: Mackellar
Party	Candidate	Votes	%	±%
Liberal	Bronwyn Bishop	44,778	57.26	−0.38
Labor	Chris Sharpe	15,492	19.81	+0.91
Greens	Christian Downie	8,193	10.48	+2.41
Independent	Robert Dunn	6,050	7.74	+7.74
Family First	Roz Trestrail	1,318	1.69	+1.69
Independent	Stephen Wells	1,231	1.57	+1.57
Democrats	Mario Nicotra	1,133	1.45	−8.01
Total formal votes		78,195	95.24	−0.10
Informal votes		3,905	4.76	+0.10
Turnout		82,100	94.16	−0.20
Two-party-preferred result
Liberal	Bronwyn Bishop	51,415	65.75	−1.12
Labor	Chris Sharpe	26,780	34.25	+1.12
Liberal hold		Swing	−1.12	

==== 2001 ====
2001 Australian federal election: Mackellar
Party	Candidate	Votes	%	±%
Liberal	Bronwyn Bishop	44,854	57.64	+2.51
Labor	Ben Carpentier	14,708	18.90	+0.11
Democrats	Vicki Dimond	7,365	9.46	+0.01
Greens	Andrea Pape	6,277	8.07	+4.75
One Nation	Peter Cuthbertson	2,182	2.80	−4.18
Independent	George May	1,265	1.63	+1.63
Against Further Immigration	Tom Moody	1,171	1.50	+1.50
Total formal votes		77,822	95.34	−1.14
Informal votes		3,801	4.66	+1.14
Turnout		81,623	94.67	
Two-party-preferred result
Liberal	Bronwyn Bishop	52,039	66.87	−0.26
Labor	Ben Carpentier	25,783	33.13	+0.26
Liberal hold		Swing	−0.26	

=== Elections in the 1990s ===
==== 1998 ====
1998 Australian federal election: Mackellar
Party	Candidate	Votes	%	±%
Liberal	Bronwyn Bishop	39,966	53.68	−0.98
Labor	Nick Lorentzen	14,605	19.62	+0.11
Democrats	Vicki Dimond	7,104	9.54	−1.40
One Nation	John Webeck	5,355	7.19	+7.19
Independent	Bob Ellis	4,729	6.35	+6.35
Greens	Trevor Ockenden	2,500	3.36	−0.97
	Stephen Doric	193	0.26	+0.26
Total formal votes		74,452	96.41	−0.29
Informal votes		2,770	3.59	+0.29
Turnout		77,222	94.67	−1.80
Two-party-preferred result
Liberal	Bronwyn Bishop	48,874	65.64	−0.88
Labor	Nick Lorentzen	25,578	34.36	+0.88
Liberal hold		Swing	−0.88	

==== 1996 ====
1996 Australian federal election: Mackellar
Party	Candidate	Votes	%	±%
Liberal	Bronwyn Bishop	40,886	54.66	−1.95
Labor	Ross McLoughlin	14,590	19.51	−13.73
Democrats	Vicki Dimond	8,188	10.95	+3.87
Greens	Chris Cairns	3,236	4.33	+4.33
Against Further Immigration	John Bridge	2,909	3.89	+3.89
Independent	Anne Ellis	2,848	3.81	+3.81
Call to Australia	Rick Bristow	1,369	1.83	+0.10
Reclaim Australia	Rodney Smith	631	0.84	+0.84
Natural Law	Stephen Doric	144	0.19	−1.16
Total formal votes		74,801	96.71	−0.29
Informal votes		2,547	3.29	+0.29
Turnout		77,348	96.47	+0.69
Two-party-preferred result
Liberal	Bronwyn Bishop	49,341	66.53	+5.37
Labor	Ross McLoughlin	24,827	33.47	−5.37
Liberal hold		Swing	+5.37	

==== 1994 by-election ====
1994 Mackellar by-election
Party	Candidate	Votes	%	±%
Liberal	Bronwyn Bishop	34,999	52.25	−4.36
Independent	Bob Ellis	15,501	23.14	+23.14
Against Further Immigration	John Phillips	5,464	8.16	+8.16
Greens	Fiona E. McLeod	3,940	5.88	+5.88
Democrats	Brian Johnson	3,851	5.75	−1.33
Independent	Stephen Ross Wells	2,063	3.08	+3.08
Republican	Peter Consandine	586	0.87	+0.87
	Godfrey Bigot	582	0.87	+0.87
Total formal votes		66,986	96.85	−0.15
Informal votes		2,181	3.15	+0.15
Turnout		69,167	87.63	−8.14
Two-candidate-preferred result
Liberal	Bronwyn Bishop	40,328	60.27	−0.89
Independent	Bob Ellis	26,587	39.73	+39.73
Liberal hold		Swing	N/A	

Jim Carlton (Liberal) resigned.

==== 1993 ====
1993 Australian federal election: Mackellar
Party	Candidate	Votes	%	±%
Liberal	Jim Carlton	41,100	56.61	+5.27
Labor	Charles Wild	24,126	33.23	+8.08
Democrats	Brian Johnson	5,139	7.08	−10.52
Call to Australia	Lesley Maher	1,253	1.73	+0.11
Natural Law	Valdamar Kurylenko	981	1.35	+1.35
Total formal votes		72,599	97.00	−0.26
Informal votes		2,247	3.00	+0.26
Turnout		74,846	95.77	
Two-party-preferred result
Liberal	Jim Carlton	44,394	61.16	−0.51
Labor	Charles Wild	28,193	38.84	+0.51
Liberal hold		Swing	−0.51	

==== 1990 ====
1990 Australian federal election: Mackellar
Party	Candidate	Votes	%	±%
Liberal	Jim Carlton	31,773	50.4	−6.5
Labor	Adam Hatcher	15,886	25.2	−5.9
Democrats	Jonathan King	11,595	18.4	+8.4
Independent	Maurice Foley	1,976	3.1	+1.0
Call to Australia	Muriel O'Neill	1,164	1.8	+1.8
Australian Green	Brad Hogarth	648	1.0	+1.0
Total formal votes		63,042	97.2	
Informal votes		1,828	2.8	
Turnout		64,870	94.7	
Two-party-preferred result
Liberal	Jim Carlton	38,358	61.1	−2.1
Labor	Adam Hatcher	24,472	38.9	+2.1
Liberal hold		Swing	−2.1	

=== Elections in the 1980s ===
==== 1987 ====
1987 Australian federal election: Mackellar
Party	Candidate	Votes	%	±%
Liberal	Jim Carlton	35,225	56.9	+2.8
Labor	Eileen Blackmore	19,254	31.1	−3.9
Democrats	Graeme Maclennan	6,189	10.0	+0.7
Independent	Maurice Foley	1,274	2.1	+0.4
Total formal votes		61,942	96.0	
Informal votes		2,584	4.0	
Turnout		64,526	93.1	
Two-party-preferred result
Liberal	Jim Carlton	39,137	63.2	+3.1
Labor	Eileen Blackmore	22,799	36.8	−3.1
Liberal hold		Swing	+3.1	

==== 1984 ====
1984 Australian federal election: Mackellar
Party	Candidate	Votes	%	±%
Liberal	Jim Carlton	31,875	54.1	−2.5
Labor	Tim Cusack	20,614	35.0	−0.9
Democrats	Graeme Maclennan	5,472	9.3	+3.1
Independent	Maurice Foley	977	1.7	+0.5
Total formal votes		58,938	94.1	
Informal votes		3,690	5.9	
Turnout		62,628	93.5	
Two-party-preferred result
Liberal	Jim Carlton	35,436	60.1	+0.4
Labor	Tim Cusack	23,500	39.9	−0.4
Liberal hold		Swing	+0.4	

==== 1983 ====
1983 Australian federal election: Mackellar
Party	Candidate	Votes	%	±%
Liberal	Jim Carlton	36,587	55.6	−4.6
Labor	Keith Jackson	24,292	36.9	+5.2
Democrats	Robert Williams	4,055	6.2	−1.9
Independent	Maurice Foley	813	1.2	+1.2
Total formal votes		65,747	98.1	
Informal votes		1,253	1.9	
Turnout		67,000	94.2	
Two-party-preferred result
Liberal	Jim Carlton		58.7	−4.8
Labor	Keith Jackson		41.3	+4.8
Liberal hold		Swing	−4.8	

==== 1980 ====
1980 Australian federal election: Mackellar
Party	Candidate	Votes	%	±%
Liberal	Jim Carlton	38,922	60.2	+4.8
Labor	Kevin Mason	20,513	31.7	+3.5
Democrats	Robert Williams	5,222	8.1	−3.1
Total formal votes		64,657	97.3	
Informal votes		1,785	2.7	
Turnout		66,442	93.5	
Two-party-preferred result
Liberal	Jim Carlton		63.5	−0.8
Labor	Kevin Mason		36.5	+0.8
Liberal hold		Swing	−0.8	

=== Elections in the 1970s ===
==== 1977 ====
1977 Australian federal election: Mackellar
Party	Candidate	Votes	%	±%
Liberal	Jim Carlton	36,064	55.4	−7.4
Labor	John Barclay	18,329	28.2	−1.9
Democrats	Robert Williams	7,262	11.2	+11.2
Independent	Ronald Davis	1,604	2.5	+2.5
Progress	John Booth	1,000	1.5	−3.5
Independent	Barry Geyle	621	1.0	+1.0
Independent	Thomas Mellor	185	0.3	+0.3
Total formal votes		65,065	97.5	
Informal votes		1,682	2.5	
Turnout		66.747	93.1	
Two-party-preferred result
Liberal	Jim Carlton		64.3	−2.7
Labor	John Barclay		35.7	+2.7
Liberal hold		Swing	−2.7	

==== 1975 ====
1975 Australian federal election: Mackellar
Party	Candidate	Votes	%	±%
Liberal	Bill Wentworth	43,536	61.4	+6.2
Labor	Kevin Mason	22,330	31.5	−8.8
Workers	Barry Bracken	3,576	5.0	+5.0
Independent	Jennifer Sheehan	1,408	2.0	+2.0
Total formal votes		70,850	98.3	
Informal votes		1,189	1.7	
Turnout		72,039	95.0	
Two-party-preferred result
Liberal	Bill Wentworth		65.6	+8.6
Labor	Kevin Mason		34.4	−8.6
Liberal hold		Swing	+8.6	

==== 1974 ====
1974 Australian federal election: Mackellar
Party	Candidate	Votes	%	±%
Liberal	Bill Wentworth	36,697	55.2	+7.1
Labor	Evan Davies	26,772	40.3	+3.8
Australia	Noel Gash	2,987	4.5	−7.2
Total formal votes		66,456	98.6	
Informal votes		949	1.4	
Turnout		67,405	93.7	
Two-party-preferred result
Liberal	Bill Wentworth		57.0	+1.8
Labor	Evan Davies		43.0	−1.8
Liberal hold		Swing	+1.8	

==== 1972 ====
1972 Australian federal election: Mackellar
Party	Candidate	Votes	%	±%
Liberal	Bill Wentworth	28,677	48.1	−8.6
Labor	Evan Davies	21,744	36.5	−1.4
Australia	Richard Jones	6,956	11.7	+11.7
Democratic Labor	Thomas Colman	1,971	3.3	−2.1
Independent	Norman Ward	284	0.5	+0.5
Total formal votes		59,632	98.3	
Informal votes		1,001	1.7	
Turnout		60,633	94.8	
Two-party-preferred result
Liberal	Bill Wentworth		55.2	−5.8
Labor	Evan Davies		44.8	+5.8
Liberal hold		Swing	−5.8	

=== Elections in the 1960s ===
==== 1969 ====
1969 Australian federal election: Mackellar
Party	Candidate	Votes	%	±%
Liberal	Bill Wentworth	29,136	56.7	−10.3
Labor	William Bramwell	19,516	37.9	+15.5
Democratic Labor	Thomas Colman	2,775	5.4	+1.9
Total formal votes		51,427	98.0	
Informal votes		1,060	2.0	
Turnout		52,487	94.1	
Two-party-preferred result
Liberal	Bill Wentworth		61.0	−11.0
Labor	William Bramwell		39.0	+11.0
Liberal hold		Swing	−11.0	

==== 1966 ====
1966 Australian federal election: Mackellar
Party	Candidate	Votes	%	±%
Liberal	Bill Wentworth	44,980	65.9	+3.7
Labor	Kenneth McLean	16,018	23.5	−6.8
Liberal Reform Group	Peter Allison	4,534	6.6	+6.6
Democratic Labor	Philip Cohen	2,699	4.0	−0.5
Total formal votes		68,231	96.9	
Informal votes		2,206	3.1	
Turnout		70,437	94.0	
Two-party-preferred result
Liberal	Bill Wentworth		70.9	+4.8
Labor	Kenneth McLean		29.1	−4.8
Liberal hold		Swing	+4.8	

==== 1963 ====
1963 Australian federal election: Mackellar
Party	Candidate	Votes	%	±%
Liberal	Bill Wentworth	37,827	62.2	+8.1
Labor	Mabel Elliott	18,440	30.3	−4.6
Democratic Labor	Philip Cohen	2,725	4.5	−1.0
Communist	Hugh Begg	1,834	3.0	−2.5
Total formal votes		60,826	98.3	
Informal votes		1,055	1.7	
Turnout		61,881	94.8	
Two-party-preferred result
Liberal	Bill Wentworth		66.1	+7.2
Labor	Mabel Elliott		33.9	−7.2
Liberal hold		Swing	+7.2	

==== 1961 ====
1961 Australian federal election: Mackellar
Party	Candidate	Votes	%	±%
Liberal	Bill Wentworth	29,248	54.1	−4.9
Labor	Mabel Elliott	18,872	34.9	+4.6
Democratic Labor	Philip Cohen	2,983	5.5	+0.8
Communist	Hugh Begg	2,971	5.5	−0.4
Total formal votes		54,074	97.5	
Informal votes		1,382	2.5	
Turnout		55,456	94.6	
Two-party-preferred result
Liberal	Bill Wentworth		58.9	−4.4
Labor	Mabel Elliott		41.1	+4.4
Liberal hold		Swing	−4.4	

=== Elections in the 1950s ===
==== 1958 ====
1958 Australian federal election: Mackellar
Party	Candidate	Votes	%	±%
Liberal	Bill Wentworth	27,258	59.0	−3.1
Labor	Mabel Elliott	14,002	30.3	−0.1
Communist	Hugh Begg	2,734	5.9	−1.6
Democratic Labor	Ann Macken	2,170	4.7	+4.7
Total formal votes		46,164	96.7	
Informal votes		1,589	3.3	
Turnout		47,753	93.3	
Two-party-preferred result
Liberal	Bill Wentworth		63.3	+0.4
Labor	Mabel Elliott		36.7	−0.4
Liberal hold		Swing	+0.4	

==== 1955 ====
1955 Australian federal election: Mackellar
Party	Candidate	Votes	%	±%
Liberal	Bill Wentworth	25,553	62.1	+2.6
Labor	Norman McAlpine	12,525	30.4	−5.6
Communist	Frank Hardy	3,087	7.5	+3.1
Total formal votes		41,165	97.0	
Informal votes		1,255	3.0	
Turnout		42,420	95.2	
Two-party-preferred result
Liberal	Bill Wentworth		62.9	+1.3
Labor	Norman McAlpine		37.1	−1.3
Liberal hold		Swing	+1.3	

==== 1954 ====
1954 Australian federal election: Mackellar
Party	Candidate	Votes	%	±%
Liberal	Bill Wentworth	28,546	59.8	−3.3
Labor	Francis Neate	17,072	35.8	−1.1
Communist	Ray Clarke	2,120	4.4	+4.4
Total formal votes		47,738	98.7	
Informal votes		650	1.3	
Turnout		48,388	95.5	
Two-party-preferred result
Liberal	Bill Wentworth		60.2	−2.9
Labor	Francis Neate		39.8	+2.9
Liberal hold		Swing	−2.9	

==== 1951 ====
1951 Australian federal election: Mackellar
Party	Candidate	Votes	%	±%
Liberal	Bill Wentworth	26,832	63.1	+0.5
Labor	Thomas Sherley	15,684	36.9	−0.5
Total formal votes		42,516	98.8	
Informal votes		953	2.2	
Turnout		43,469	95.2	
Liberal hold		Swing	+0.5	

=== Elections in the 1940s ===
==== 1949 ====
1949 Australian federal election: Mackellar
Party	Candidate	Votes	%	±%
Liberal	Bill Wentworth	25,678	62.6	+7.2
Labor	James Mitchell	15,314	37.4	−7.2
Total formal votes		40,992	97.5	
Informal votes		1,068	2.5	
Turnout		42,060	96.2	
Liberal notional hold		Swing	+7.2	
