= Members of the Australian House of Representatives, 1993–1996 =

This is a list of members of the Australian House of Representatives from 1993 to 1996, as elected at the 1993 federal election.

Member	Party	Electorate	State	Term in office
Tony Abbott^{[5]}	Liberal	Warringah	NSW	1994–2019
Dick Adams	Labor	Lyons	Tas	1993–2013
Ken Aldred	Liberal	Deakin	Vic	1975–1980, 1983–1996
John Anderson	National	Gwydir	NSW	1989–2007
Neil Andrew	Liberal	Wakefield	SA	1983–2004
Kevin Andrews	Liberal	Menzies	Vic	1991–2022
Rod Atkinson	Liberal	Isaacs	Vic	1990–1996
Peter Baldwin	Labor	Sydney	NSW	1983–1998
Julian Beale	Liberal	Bruce	Vic	1984–1996
Kim Beazley	Labor	Swan	WA	1980–2007
David Beddall	Labor	Rankin	Qld	1983–1998
Arch Bevis	Labor	Brisbane	Qld	1990–2010
Gordon Bilney	Labor	Kingston	SA	1983–1996
Bronwyn Bishop ^{[4]}	Liberal	Mackellar	NSW	1994–2016
Neal Blewett ^{[3]}	Labor	Bonython	SA	1977–1994
John Bradford	Liberal	McPherson	Qld	1990–1998
Ray Braithwaite	National	Dawson	Qld	1975–1996
Laurie Brereton	Labor	Kingsford-Smith	NSW	1990–2004
Bob Brown	Labor	Charlton	NSW	1980–1998
Alan Cadman	Liberal	Mitchell	NSW	1974–2007
Eoin Cameron	Liberal	Stirling	WA	1993–1998
Graeme Campbell	Labor	Kalgoorlie	WA	1980–1998
Jim Carlton ^{[4]}	Liberal	Mackellar	NSW	1977–1994
Bob Charles	Liberal	La Trobe	Vic	1990–2004
Bob Chynoweth	Labor	Dunkley	Vic	1984–1990, 1993–1996
Phil Cleary	Independent	Wills	Vic	1992, 1993–1996
Peter Cleeland	Labor	McEwen	Vic	1984–1990, 1993–1996
Michael Cobb	National	Parkes	NSW	1984–1998
David Connolly	Liberal	Bradfield	NSW	1974–1996
Peter Costello	Liberal	Higgins	Vic	1990–2009
Mary Crawford	Labor	Forde	Qld	1987–1996
Simon Crean	Labor	Hotham	Vic	1990–2013
Janice Crosio	Labor	Prospect	NSW	1990–2004
Barry Cunningham	Labor	McMillan	Vic	1980–1990, 1993–1996
John Dawkins ^{[2]}	Labor	Fremantle	WA	1974–1975, 1977–1994
Maggie Deahm	Labor	Macquarie	NSW	1993–1996
Don Dobie	Liberal	Cook	NSW	1966–1972, 1975–1996
Peter Dodd	Labor	Leichhardt	Qld	1993–1996
Alexander Downer	Liberal	Mayo	SA	1984–2008
Michael Duffy	Labor	Holt	Vic	1980–1996
Peter Duncan	Labor	Makin	SA	1984–1996
Mary Easson	Labor	Lowe	NSW	1993–1996
Paul Elliott	Labor	Parramatta	NSW	1990–1996
Martyn Evans ^{[3]}	Labor	Bonython	SA	1994–2004
Richard Evans	Liberal	Cowan	WA	1993–1998
Wendy Fatin	Labor	Brand	WA	1983–1996
Laurie Ferguson	Labor	Reid	NSW	1990–2016
Paul Filing	Liberal	Moore	WA	1990–1998
Tim Fischer	National	Farrer	NSW	1984–2001
Eric Fitzgibbon	Labor	Hunter	NSW	1984–1996
John Forrest	National	Mallee	Vic	1993–2013
Ross Free	Labor	Lindsay	NSW	1980–1996
Chris Gallus	Liberal	Hindmarsh	SA	1990–2004
George Gear	Labor	Canning	WA	1983–1996
Petro Georgiou ^{[6]}	Liberal	Kooyong	Vic	1994–2010
Garrie Gibson	Labor	Moreton	Qld	1990–1996
Russ Gorman	Labor	Greenway	NSW	1983–1996
Ted Grace	Labor	Fowler	NSW	1984–1998
Alan Griffin	Labor	Corinella	Vic	1993–2016
Alan Griffiths	Labor	Maribyrnong	Vic	1983–1996
Steele Hall	Liberal	Boothby	SA	1981–1996
Bob Halverson	Liberal	Casey	Vic	1984–1998
Chris Haviland	Labor	Macarthur	NSW	1993–1996
David Hawker	Liberal	Wannon	Vic	1983–2010
Marjorie Henzell	Labor	Capricornia	Qld	1993–1996
John Hewson ^{[8]}	Liberal	Wentworth	NSW	1987–1995
Noel Hicks	National	Riverina	NSW	1980–1998
Clyde Holding	Labor	Melbourne Ports	Vic	1977–1998
Colin Hollis	Labor	Throsby	NSW	1983–1998
Bob Horne	Labor	Paterson	NSW	1993–1996, 1998–2001
John Howard	Liberal	Bennelong	NSW	1974–2007
Brian Howe	Labor	Batman	Vic	1977–1996
Ben Humphreys	Labor	Griffith	Qld	1977–1996
Harry Jenkins	Labor	Scullin	Vic	1986–2013
Gary Johns	Labor	Petrie	Qld	1987–1996
Barry Jones	Labor	Lalor	Vic	1977–1998
David Jull	Liberal	Fadden	Qld	1975–1983, 1984–2007
Bob Katter	National	Kennedy	Qld	1993–present
Paul Keating	Labor	Blaxland	NSW	1969–1996
Ros Kelly ^{[7]}	Labor	Canberra	ACT	1980–1995
David Kemp	Liberal	Goldstein	Vic	1990–2004
John Kerin ^{[1]}	Labor	Werriwa	NSW	1972–1975, 1978–1993
Duncan Kerr	Labor	Denison	Tas	1987–2010
Peter Knott	Labor	Gilmore	NSW	1993–1996
John Langmore	Labor	Fraser	ACT	1984–1997
Mark Latham ^{[1]}	Labor	Werriwa	NSW	1994–2005
Michael Lavarch	Labor	Dickson	Qld	1987–1996
Carmen Lawrence ^{[2]}	Labor	Fremantle	WA	1994–2007
Michael Lee	Labor	Dobell	NSW	1984–2001
Lou Lieberman	Liberal	Indi	Vic	1993–2001
Ted Lindsay	Labor	Herbert	Qld	1983–1996
Bruce Lloyd	National	Murray	Vic	1971–1996
Ted Mack	Independent	North Sydney	NSW	1990–1996
Michael MacKellar ^{[5]}	Liberal	Warringah	NSW	1969–1994
Stephen Martin	Labor	Cunningham	NSW	1984–2002
Stewart McArthur	Liberal	Corangamite	Vic	1984–2007
Peter McGauran	National	Gippsland	Vic	1983–2008
Jeannette McHugh	Labor	Grayndler	NSW	1983–1996
Ian McLachlan	Liberal	Barker	SA	1990–1998
Leo McLeay	Labor	Watson	NSW	1979–2004
Daryl Melham	Labor	Banks	NSW	1990–2013
Chris Miles	Liberal	Braddon	Tas	1984–1998
John Moore	Liberal	Ryan	Qld	1975–2001
Allan Morris	Labor	Newcastle	NSW	1983–2001
Peter Morris	Labor	Shortland	NSW	1972–1998
Judi Moylan	Liberal	Pearce	WA	1993–2013
Garry Nehl	National	Cowper	NSW	1984–2001
Neville Newell	Labor	Richmond	NSW	1990–1996
Paul Neville	National	Hinkler	Qld	1993–2013
Peter Nugent	Liberal	Aston	Vic	1990–2001
Gavan O'Connor	Labor	Corio	Vic	1993–2007
Neil O'Keefe	Labor	Burke	Vic	1984–2001
Andrew Peacock ^{[6]}	Liberal	Kooyong	Vic	1966–1994
Roger Price	Labor	Chifley	NSW	1984–2010
Geoff Prosser	Liberal	Forrest	WA	1987–2007
Gary Punch	Labor	Barton	NSW	1983–1996
Christopher Pyne	Liberal	Sturt	SA	1993–2019
Harry Quick	Labor	Franklin	Tas	1993–2007
Bruce Reid	Liberal	Bendigo	Vic	1990–1998
Peter Reith	Liberal	Flinders	Vic	1982–1983, 1984–2001
Allan Rocher	Liberal	Curtin	WA	1981–1998
Michael Ronaldson	Liberal	Ballarat	Vic	1990–2001
Philip Ruddock	Liberal	Berowra	NSW	1973–2016
Rod Sawford	Labor	Port Adelaide	SA	1988–2007
Con Sciacca	Labor	Bowman	Qld	1987–2004
Bruce Scott	National	Maranoa	Qld	1990–2016
Les Scott	Labor	Oxley	Qld	1988–1996
John Sharp	National	Hume	NSW	1984–1998
David Simmons	Labor	Calare	NSW	1983–1996
Ian Sinclair	National	New England	NSW	1963–1998
Peter Slipper	Liberal	Fisher	Qld	1984–1987, 1993–2013
Silvia Smith	Labor	Bass	Tas	1993–1996
Stephen Smith	Labor	Perth	WA	1993–2013
Brendan Smyth ^{[7]}	Liberal	Canberra	ACT	1995–1996
Jim Snow	Labor	Eden-Monaro	NSW	1983–1996
Warren Snowdon	Labor	Northern Territory	NT	1987–1996, 1998–2022
Alex Somlyay	Liberal	Fairfax	Qld	1990–2013
Peter Staples	Labor	Jagajaga	Vic	1983–1996
Kathy Sullivan	Liberal	Moncrieff	Qld	1984–2001
Wayne Swan	Labor	Lilley	Qld	1993–1996, 1998–2019
Lindsay Tanner	Labor	Melbourne	Vic	1993–2010
Bill Taylor	Liberal	Groom	Qld	1988–1998
Andrew Theophanous	Labor	Calwell	Vic	1980–2001
Andrew Thomson ^{[8]}	Liberal	Wentworth	NSW	1995–2001
Robert Tickner	Labor	Hughes	NSW	1984–1996
Warren Truss	National	Wide Bay	Qld	1990–2016
Wilson Tuckey	Liberal	O'Connor	WA	1980–2010
Mark Vaile	National	Lyne	NSW	1993–2008
Barry Wakelin	Liberal	Grey	SA	1993–2007
Frank Walker	Labor	Robertson	NSW	1990–1996
Daryl Williams	Liberal	Tangney	WA	1993–2004
Ralph Willis	Labor	Gellibrand	Vic	1972–1998
Harry Woods	Labor	Page	NSW	1990–1996
Michael Wooldridge	Liberal	Chisholm	Vic	1987–2001
Trish Worth	Liberal	Adelaide	SA	1993–2004

== Notes ==
^{1} Labor member John Kerin resigned in December 1993; Labor candidate Mark Latham won the resulting by-election on 29 January 1994.
^{2} Labor member John Dawkins resigned in February 1994; Labor candidate Carmen Lawrence won the resulting by-election on 12 March 1994.
^{3} Labor member Neal Blewett resigned in February 1994; Labor candidate Martyn Evans won the resulting by-election on 19 March 1994.
^{4} Liberal member Jim Carlton resigned in January 1994; Liberal candidate Bronwyn Bishop won the resulting by-election on 26 March 1994.
^{5} Liberal member Michael MacKellar resigned in February 1994; Liberal candidate Tony Abbott won the resulting by-election on 26 March 1994.
^{6} Liberal member Andrew Peacock resigned in September 1994; Liberal candidate Petro Georgiou won the resulting by-election on 19 November 1994.
^{7} Labor member Ros Kelly resigned in January 1995; Liberal candidate Brendan Smyth won the resulting by-election on 25 March 1995.
^{8} Liberal member John Hewson resigned in February 1995; Liberal candidate Andrew Thomson won the resulting by-election on 8 April 1995.
