= Rowan Dean =

Australian advertising executive and social commentator

- Born: Canberra, Australia
- Occupations: Advertising executive; television presenter; magazine editor
- Employer: Sky News Australia

Rowan Dean is an Australian advertising executive and conservative commentator. After a career as an advertising industry copywriter, Dean was a panellist on early seasons of Gruen, and became a commentator with multiple newspapers and a co-host of conservative Sky News Australia program Outsiders. He is currently the editor of Spectator Australia in addition to being a frequent contributor. He is a columnist at the Australian Financial Review, has written for The Age, and has appeared on the ABC's panel talk show Q&A.

== Career ==
=== Advertising ===
Educated at Canberra Grammar School, Dean moved to Britain in 1978 and worked in a number of advertising agencies. He co-wrote the 'Photobooth' commercial for Hamlet Cigars, as well as successfully launching Foster's Lager into the UK market, winning D&AD Awards and both Gold and Silver Cannes Lions. Dean returned to Australia in 1988 working in the Australian advertising industry, setting up Rowan Dean Films in 1995 to produce advertisements.

=== Broadcasting ===
Dean was a regular panellist on ABC comedy series Gruen from 2008, and started writing pieces for News Corp Australia and The Australian Financial Review. Dean became editor of The Spectator Australia in 2014.

In 2016, Dean became co-host of the Sky News Australia conservative commentary program Outsiders, along with Mark Latham and Ross Cameron. The stated impetus for the program's launch was as an answer to the ABC's weekly Insiders current affairs talk show which, according to Dean, Cameron and Latham, was "the embodiment of an out-of-touch, inner-city Leftist class". The program has proved controversial. In July 2016, Outsiders guest David Leyonhjelm remarked on air that Australian Greens senator Sarah Hanson-Young was "well-known [in parliament] for liking men", leading to an on-air apology from Dean and a producer being stood down. Dean remains the only original host of the format, with the other two initial co-hosts being fired by the channel for various controversies related to comments made during the program.

Dean is a frequent critic of political correctness and cancel culture and frequently speaks out on controversial cultural issues. He produced a special for Sky News titled The Death of the Aussie Larrikin, in which he and a host of guests contended that political correctness was destroying Australia's larrikin tradition. Dean has also ridiculed the modern push to rename brands and place names with offensive connotations. Dean was criticised in The Guardian in June 2016 after compiling a "Poor Me List" (a parody of a rich list) mocking prominent Australians who he perceived as displaying a victim mentality in spite of their success, many of whom were Indigenous Australians or from other ethnic minorities.

Dean has been accused of misogyny based on his comments about women and feminism. In December 2018, Spectator Australia published a column that described the Australian Greens senator Sarah Hanson-Young in sexualised language, which the Greens leadership called "appalling" and demanded that Sky News and the Australian Financial Review sack Dean.

In July 2017, Dean suggested on Sky News that the Australian Race Discrimination Commissioner, Tim Soutphommasane, should "leave the country" after Soutphommasane called for more cultural diversity in Australian media and politics. On Sky News he comically mispronounced Soutphommasane's name and said "Tim, if you don’t like [Australia], join Yassmin, hop on a plane and go back to Laos" in what Junkee's Osman Faruqi called a "blatantly race-based attack". Soutphommasane was in fact born in Montpellier, France, to Chinese and Laotian parents. Several Sky News presenters publicly distanced themselves from Dean, with Sky's chief political reporter, Kieran Gilbert, describing Dean's comments as "pathetic", "low" and "reprehensible".

Dean is a supporter of US President Donald Trump. In November 2016, Dean attended a party at The Rugby Club in Sydney to celebrate the victory of Donald Trump in the 2016 United States presidential election. In 2018, Dean described Trump as "the greatest president since Ronald Reagan". Dean prematurely predicted the re-election of Donald Trump in 2020 on Sky News based on early, incomplete results. In the aftermath of the election, Dean drew criticism from a columnist writing for The Guardian for repeating the debunked and discredited claim that Joe Biden's victory was due to large-scale electoral fraud.

Dean rejects the scientific consensus on climate change and has claimed that human induced climate change is a "hoax". He was widely criticised for comments he made on Sky News in 2019 that climate change was a "fraudulent and dangerous cult" and that children boycotting school to protest climate inaction was a form of "child abuse".

On 13 December 2020, Dean expressed fear about the Great Reset on Sky News Australia, claiming that "This Great Reset is as serious and dangerous a threat to our prosperity – to your prosperity and your freedom – as we have faced in decades."

== Bibliography ==
- Beyond Satire: ISBN 9781922168726, 290 pages, Connor Court Publishing Pty Ltd, 2013.
- Way Beyond Satire: ISBN 9781925265873, 288 pages, Wilkinson Publishing, 2017.
- Corkscrewed: ISBN 978-1925642124, 320 pages, Wilkinson Publishing, 2017.
- The Best of The Spectator Australia: ISBN 9781925642070, 368 pages, Wilkinson Publishing, 2017.
- The Canberry Tales: Salacious Satire from the Culture Wars: ISBN 9781925927818, 288 pages, Wilkinson Publishing, 2021.
- The Many Lives of Barry Humphries: A Treasury of Reminiscences: ISBN 9781922810694, 240 pages, Wilkinson Publishing, 2023.
