= 1994 Warringah by-election =

Australian federal by-election

- 26 March 1994
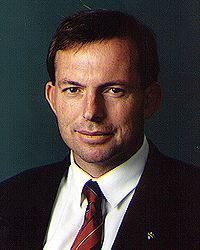
	First party	Second party
		IND
Candidate	Tony Abbott	Judith Halnan
Party	Liberal	Independent
Primary vote	34,440	9,563
Percentage	55.21%	15.33%
Swing	▼0.89	▲15.33
TPP	63.46%	36.54%
TPP swing	▲3.20pp	▲36.54pp
	Third party	Fourth party
	DEM	AAFI
Candidate	Troy Anderson	Robyn Spencer
Party	Democrats	AAFI
Primary vote	9,932	8,446
Percentage	15.92%	13.54%
Swing	▲11.66	▲13.54
MP before election
Michael MacKellar
Liberal
Elected MP
Tony Abbott
Liberal

The 1994 Warringah by-election was held in the Australian electorate of Warringah in New South Wales on 26 March 1994. The by-election was triggered by the resignation of the sitting member, Liberal MP Michael MacKellar on 18 February 1994, from the safe Liberal seat. The writ for the by-election was issued on the same day.

The by-election was won by Liberal candidate Tony Abbott who served as the Prime Minister of Australia from 18 September 2013 to 15 September 2015. Abbott would hold the seat for 25 years until he would lose the seat to teal independent Zali Steggall.

The Warringah by-election was held on the same day as the Mackellar by-election triggered by the resignation of sitting Liberal member Jim Carlton.

During the by-elections in Mackellar and Warringah, the maverick far-right Labor MP Graeme Campbell urged electors to vote for Australians Against Further Immigration. Labor did not field a candidate in either by-election.

Unsuccessful candidates for Liberal preselection included former NSW Liberal leader John Dowd, future MP Peter King, and future senator Concetta Fierravanti-Wells.

== Results ==
1994 Warringah by-election
Party	Candidate	Votes	%	±%
Liberal	Tony Abbott	34,440	55.21	−0.89
Democrats	Troy Anderson	9,932	15.92	+11.66
Independent	Judith Halnan	9,564	15.33	+15.33
AAFI	Robyn Marion Spencer	8,446	13.54	+13.54
Total formal votes		62,382	96.39	−1.23
Informal votes		2,339	3.61	+1.23
Turnout		64,721	82.79	−12.68
Two-party-preferred result
Liberal	Tony Abbott	39,588	63.46	+3.20
Independent	Judith Halnan	22,794	36.54	+36.54
Liberal hold				

== See also ==
- List of Australian federal by-elections
