= Adam Magro =

Australian rugby union player (born 1971)

- Full name: Adam Terry Fergus Magro
- Born: 14 April 1971 (age 55) Sydney, NSW, Australia
- School: Sydney Boys High School
- Notable relative: Sophie Scamps (wife)
- Occupation: Mortgage broker

Rugby union career
- Position: Outside centre
Senior career
Years	Team	Apps	(Points)
2000	Toyota Shokki		
2001–03	Leinster		
Super Rugby
Years	Team	Apps	(Points)
1996–99	Brumbies	23	(15)
2001	Waratahs	1	(0)
International career
Years	Team	Apps	(Points)
1996–97	Australia		
2004	Malta		

Adam Terry Fergus Magro (born 14 April 1971) is an Australian former professional rugby union player.

== Early years ==
A native of Sydney, Magro played junior rugby with Coogee Seahorses and made the GPS 1st XV during his time at Sydney Boys High School. He gained Australian Schoolboys representative honours in 1988, as a centre partner to future Wallaby Matt O'Connor, then continued his studies at the University of New South Wales.

== Rugby career ==
Magro, an outside centre, was signed by the ACT Brumbies from Randwick for the inaugural Super 12 season. His first season form was enough to earn a Wallabies call up for the 1996 end of year tour of Europe. He made his first Wallabies appearance in a tour match against Combined Scottish Districts, after which he had to return home with a broken ankle. The following year, Magro made his second Wallabies tour, but again only played uncapped matches.

Finishing at the Brumbies in 1999, Magro spent the next period of his career overseas, starting with a year in Japan at Toyota Shokki. He returned to Randwick briefly in 2001, then linked up with Irish team Leinster for two seasons. While studying for a Masters of Science, Magro won a blue featuring for Oxford University in the 2003 Varsity match.

Magro is of Maltese descent and played Test rugby for Malta in 2004.

== Personal life ==
Magro, a mortgage broker, is married to independent MP Sophie Scamps.
