= Sophie Scamps =

Australian politician, general practitioner (born 1971)

Sophie Scamps MP FRACGP
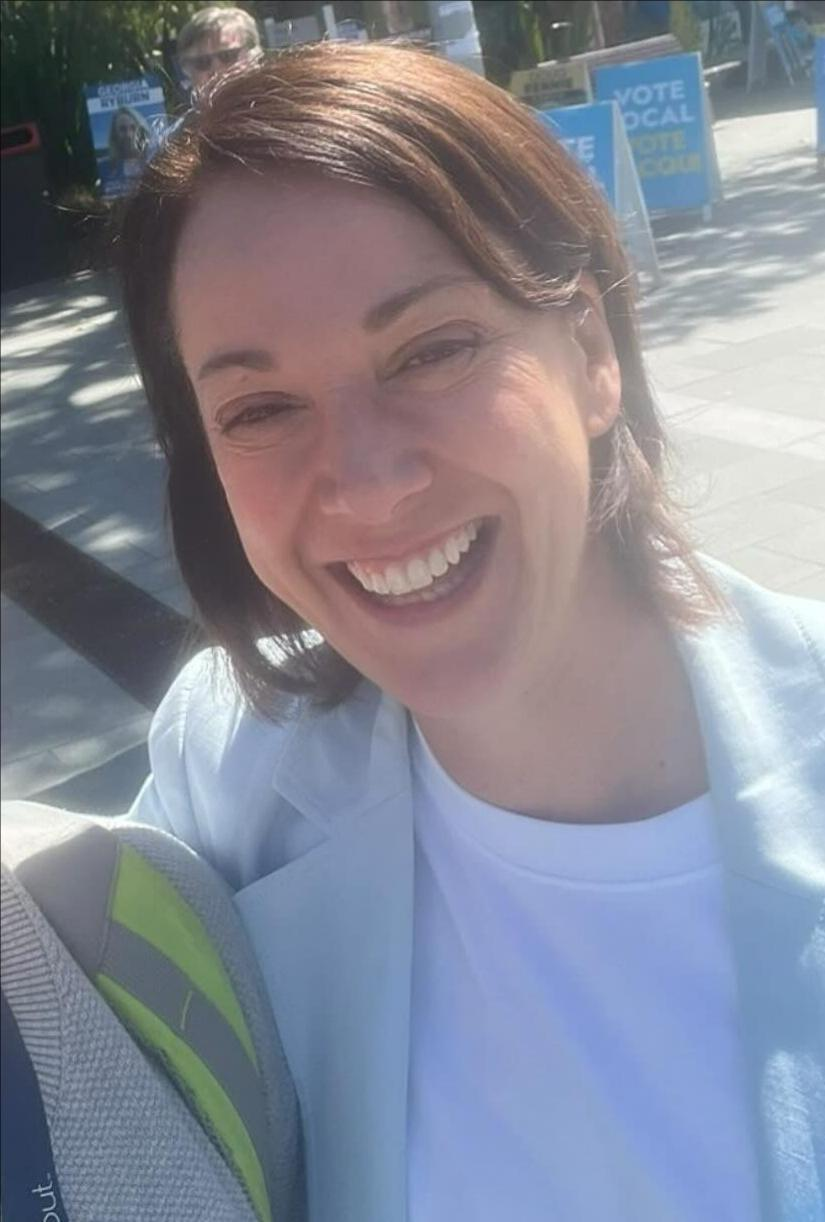
- Scamps in 2024

Member of the Australian Parliament for Mackellar
- Incumbent
- Assumed office 21 May 2022
- Preceded by: Jason Falinski

Personal details
- Born: 15 March 1971 (age 55) Wahroonga, New South Wales, Australia
- Party: Independent
- Spouse: Adam Magro
- Education: University of Sydney; UNSW; University of Oxford
- Occupation: Politician; athlete; general practitioner
- Website: Official website

Sophie Scamps (/skɒmps/ SKOMPS; born 15 March 1971) is an Australian independent politician, general practitioner, and former athlete. In the 2022 Australian federal election, she was elected as the Member for Mackellar in the Australian House of Representatives as a teal independent candidate.

Scamps was born in New South Wales, and spent her early career competing in running at an Olympic standard. She completed her higher education at the University of Sydney, University of New South Wales, and University of Oxford.

In 2020, Scamps became involved in politics, co-founding the "Voices of Mackellar" group, and was chosen as the independent candidate for Mackellar. At the 2022 federal election, she was elected with 52.5% of the after-preferences vote after a campaign that focused on climate change, integrity, and respect for women.

As a member of parliament, Scamps has introduced several private member's bills relating to health and integrity policy, and has advocated for a number of issues such as climate action and support for an Indigenous Voice to Parliament.

== Early life ==
Scamps was born on 15 March 1971, and grew up in Turramurra, New South Wales. She attended Abbotsleigh school.

Scamps was a sprinter and middle-distance runner. She competed internationally for Australia, and was a member of the gold medal winning 4 × 400 m relay team at the 1990 World under-20 Championships. Her team achieved the 1992 Olympic qualifying standard of 3:38.00 in that race, but Scamps was not ultimately selected by Athletics Australia to start any races at the 1992 Olympics. Her personal bests included 55.72s for 400 m (Canberra, 1991), 2:07:31 for 800 m (Athens, 1986), and 3:30:38 in the 4 × 400 m relay (Deveti Septemvri Stadium, Plodiv, 1990).

Scamps studied medicine at the University of Sydney, graduating in 1995. Later, she received a Master of Public Health degree from the University of New South Wales, and a Master of Science with honours degree from the University of Oxford. According to her profile on the Narrabeen Family Health website, Scamps practised emergency medicine in Canberra and at Royal North Shore and Mona Vale Hospitals, before electing to move into General Practice.

In 2019, Scamps co-founded the Our Blue Dot environmental movement, which campaigned for waste reduction and reduction of carbon emissions.

== 2022 election campaign ==
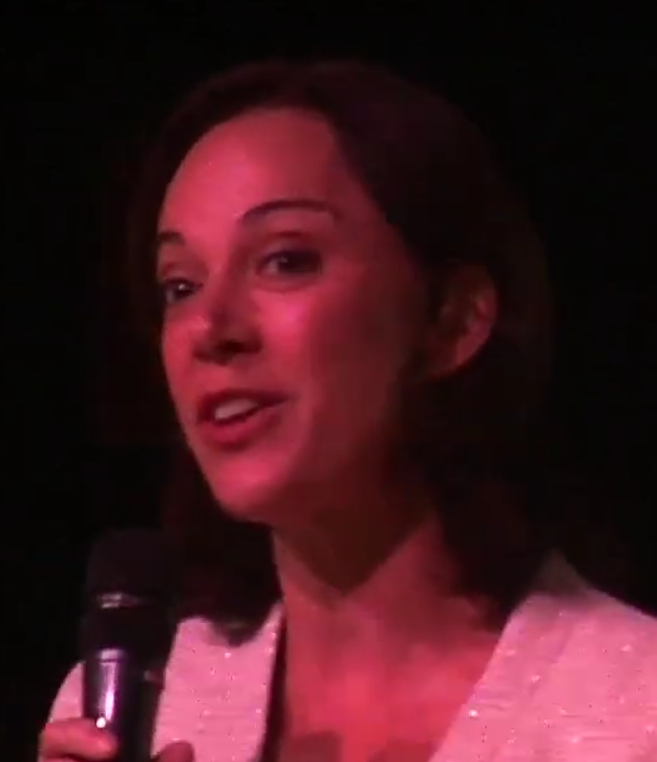
Scamps speaking at a candidate forum in 2022

In 2020, using the "kitchen table conversations" model previously employed by former Indi independent Cathy McGowan, Scamps and four like-minded locals created the "Voices of Mackellar" group. Scamps left Voices of Mackellar in January 2021, and created Mackellar Rising, a group designed to find an independent candidate.

Backed by Climate 200, as well as a large grass-roots local campaign, Scamps announced her candidacy as an independent for the 2022 Australian federal election in December 2021. She was one of the 23 independents who ran. Scamps is classified as a teal independent, as she was one of a group of independents at the 2022 federal election supported by Climate 200. Her campaign focused on the issues of climate, integrity and gender diversity. Scamps has stated that she became motivated to stand for election when she received a survey from the incumbent Liberal Member of Parliament Jason Falinski, which omitted climate change as an issue important to Mackellar residents. Scamps has also said that Julia Gillard's Misogyny Speech inspired her to enter politics.

Scamps' campaign was primarily community-funded, as she received A$1,558,960 from 828 separate donors to her election campaign, and spent A$1,216,746.

In early May 2022, fake election posters were placed around Mackellar, falsely claiming that Scamps was a member of the Australian Greens.

Scamps won Mackellar at the election with 52.5% of the two-candidate vote after preferences, representing a 15.73% swing against Falinski. In her first speech, Scamps stated her support for the Uluru Statement from the Heart, action on climate change, and implementation of a federal version of New South Wales' Independent Commission Against Corruption.

== Member of Parliament (2022–) ==
=== 2022 ===
In July 2022, Scamps announced she would introduce a bill to parliament to prevent public servants and politicians being appointed to public offices based on personal connections, rather than based on skill. In March 2023, Scamps tabled it as a private member's bill entitled "Transparent and Quality Public Appointments Bill 2023 ('Ending Jobs for Mates Bill')". The bill was written with the support of the Centre for Public Integrity. Scamps stated the bill specifically targeted appointments such as Kathryn Campbell's appointment as an advisor on AUKUS, with an annual salary of A$900,000.

In August, Scamps called for a parliamentary investigation into the secret appointment of Prime Minister Scott Morrison to several ministries. In September, Scamps introduced a motion to the House of Representatives, proposing that the Parliament recognised climate change as a health emergency. Scamps also stated in Parliament her support for lifting the Medicare rebate to increase the number of General Practitioners (GPs), stating "Not enough GPs are being trained because the stagnant Medicare rebate was not enough to attract them, especially when other medical specialties are better remunerated."

=== 2023 ===
In February, Scamps called for federal recognition of the 1915 Armenian, Assyrian and Greek genocides carried out by the Ottoman Empire. In June, Scamps introduced a private member's bill to Parliament entitled "Healthy Kids Advertising Bill 2023". The bill proposed to ban advertising of junk food on television and radio between 6 am and 9:30 pm, and a blanket ban on online advertising of junk food. Scamps' bill was publicly supported by fellow teal MP Monique Ryan, the Australian Medical Association, Dietitians Australia, the Cancer Council, the Food for Health Alliance, the Public Health Association of Australia, The Royal Australasian College of Physicians, The Royal Australian College of General Practitioners, and the Heart Foundation. In response, the federal health minister Mark Butler met with Scamps and announced a A$500,000 feasibility study on restricting junk food marketing to children.

In August, Scamps joined with Ryan to criticise government legislation allowing companies to store carbon dioxide emissions in undersea repositories in international waters. Scamps described the proposal as "a colossal attempt at greenwashing". In October, Scamps introduced a private member's bill to the House to expand the existing "Water Trigger", requiring the federal environment minister to assess gas fracking projects for risks of damage to local water resources. Scamps' bill was seconded by fellow teal Zali Steggall.

Scamps supported the unsuccessful campaign to create an Indigenous Voice to Parliament, which was voted upon in the October 2023 referendum. She spoke at a number of public forums discussing the importance of the referendum succeeding. In October, Scamps called for a parliamentary inquiry into the harmful effects of gambling advertising on young people. She was supported by the Greens as well as MPs Kate Chaney, Zoe Daniel, Monique Ryan and Andrew Wilkie. On 17 October, Scamps voted for a resolution in parliament that condemned the 2023 Hamas-led attack on Israel. The Greens proposed an amendment to the resolution, adding a statement that said Parliament also condemned "war crimes perpetrated by the State of Israel, including the bombing of Palestinian civilians". Scamps supported the amendment, but it was not successful. The resolution passed with the support of the government, opposition, and several crossbenchers.

In November 2023, Scamps led a campaign to ban native forest logging in Australia. She was supported by former environment ministers Robert Hill and Peter Garrett, all other federal teal independents, Senator David Pocock, environmental advocacy groups, and other state and federal parliamentarians. Scamps also assisted the Mona Vale Surf Club in her electorate to apply for a Commonwealth grant to purchase a beach-accessible wheelchair. Her office subsequently ran a free grant-writing workshop to instruct community organisations in applying for government funding.

=== 2024 ===
In February 2024, Scamps called for the Australian government to restore funding to UNRWA after it was withdrawn in January, and for there to be an immediate ceasefire in the Gaza war. In response, on 5 March, former Speaker and Liberal MP Bronwyn Bishop stated on Sky News Australia that Scamps was "part and parcel of the antisemitic movement". Bishop apologised and withdrew her comments a week later.

== Personal life ==
As of 2022, Scamps lives in Avalon on Sydney's Northern Beaches, with her husband – former Australia national rugby union team player Adam Magro – and three children. Scamps' family also hosted a family of Ukrainian refugees from the Russian invasion of Ukraine. Her surname is Belgian and pronounced 'Scomps'. As well as her home in Avalon, Scamps owns three investment properties and a farm in Wee Jasper, New South Wales.

Parliament of Australia
Preceded by Jason Falinski	Member for Mackellar; 2022–present	Incumbent
