= Outsiders (Australian TV program) =

Australian television news and commentary show

- Genre: News; political analysis; commentary
- Presented by: Rowan Dean; Rita Panahi; James Morrow; Ross Cameron (2016–2018); Mark Latham (2016–2017)
- Country of origin: Australia
- Original language: English
- No. of seasons: 9

Production
- Running time: 1–2 hours (incl. adverts)

Original release
- Network: News24
- Release: 4 December 2016 – present

Outsiders is an Australian television news and commentary show broadcast on News24. The show is currently co-hosted by editor of The Spectator magazine Rowan Dean, The Friday Show host Rita Panahi, and The Daily Telegraph opinion editor James Morrow, and features long-form discussion of political issues between conservative contributors.

The show is broadcast from the News24 Centre in the Sydney suburb of Surry Hills. The series debuted in a pilot episode on 4 December 2016, and began airing weekly in 2017, before the format expanded to a two-hour Sunday morning edition and hourly primetime episodes in 2018. From October to December 2018, the show aired late at night, four times a week.

The show debuted with three co-hosts, two of whom were fired for separate controversial comments. Former Labor leader Mark Latham was the show's primary host until his employment was terminated by Sky News on 29 March 2017, following several controversial statements made on the show. On 2 November 2018, former Liberal MP Ross Cameron became the second co-host to be sacked, after using offensive racial stereotypes to refer to Chinese people.

== Background ==
The format was designed as a response to the long-running ABC program Insiders, which many conservatives see as aimed towards the "inner-city leftist class". The hosting trio described themselves as "[Donald] Trump's Aussie mates" and proudly boasted "absolutely no balance whatsoever", intending to "do the opposite of [Insiders host] Barrie Cassidy". In 2017, the program aired at 10 a.m. AEDT, beginning as Insiders concluded, but in 2018, the program added a second hour, beginning at the same time as Insiders and competing with it directly.

The program was the second format co-hosted by both Cameron (following the now-defunct Keneally and Cameron) and Latham (who continued co-hosting Jones + Co until his sacking), and is the first hosting role for Dean. It was developed following the appearance of all three men on an episode of Paul Murray Live.

== Reception ==
The pilot episode on 4 December 2016 was watched by 22,159 viewers, a 79 per cent increase in the timeslot average of Weekend Live ratings over the previous four weeks. Amongst homes with subscription television (STV), Insiders on the ABC was watched by 790,070 viewers, and including viewers without STV rated 220,000 viewers.

An episode on 5 March 2017 had 37,000 viewers but that dropped to 24,000 viewers on 26 March, following a series of controversial comments by Latham.

An episode on 27 August 2017 was the twentieth-most-watched program on subscription television, with viewership of 41,000.

In the first half of 2018, Sky maintained that the weekend edition of Outsiders increased its audience by 24 per cent, the Monday edition by 84 per cent and the Thursday edition by 105 per cent in their respective timeslots "year-on-year".

== Controversies ==
In early 2017, Sky News presenter Peter van Onselen, whose program Sunday Agenda airs ahead of Outsiders, was critical of the program following an Outsiders segment which named van Onselen's wife Ainslie as a member of the "diversity bunch" who Latham claims push diversity but only help "rich and privileged women". The ABC program Media Watch noted that Ainslie van Onselen had left her position five months earlier. The same report revealed Outsiders has an audience of only 31,000 viewers each week.

Latham's employment was terminated by Sky News on 29 March 2017, following several controversial statements made on the program. Subsequently, the program was put on hiatus, with the scheduled episode on 2 April 2017 being pulled. When it returned on 9 April 2017, it was revealed that the program would use rotating guest hosts in place of Latham, until the use of the third host was eventually dropped several week later. In April 2017, Latham launched a website called Mark Latham's Outsiders and began hosting a weekly Facebook Live program affiliated with The Rebel Media. Despite sharing the same name, it was unrelated to the Sky News program.

On 1 July 2018, a producer of Outsiders was suspended after the program broadcast controversial comments by Senator David Leyonhjelm about the personal life of Senator Sarah Hanson-Young, and further displayed them in an on-screen strap. Sky News issued an apology on Twitter hours later, describing the comments as "appalling". In response to a social media campaign targeting companies who advertise during Outsiders, Sky News replaced paid advertisements with station promotions in episodes airing the following week.

In November 2018, Cameron was sacked from Sky News days after making allegedly racist comments on Outsiders, becoming the second original co-host to be fired. The program briefly used a roster of guest co-hosts alongside Dean, including Liberal MP Craig Kelly, until permanent presenters were appointed in 2019. Panahi and Morrow were appointed permanent co-hosts alongside Dean in 2019.
