= Jason Falinski =

Australian politician

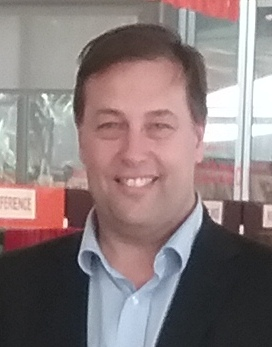
- Falinski in 2016

President of NSW Liberal Party
- In office 7 July 2023 – 11 March 2024
- Preceded by: Maria Kovacic
- Succeeded by: Don Harwin

Member of the Australian Parliament for Mackellar
- In office 2 July 2016 – 21 May 2022
- Preceded by: Bronwyn Bishop
- Succeeded by: Sophie Scamps

Councillor of Warringah Council for A Ward
- In office 13 September 2008 – 8 September 2012
- Preceded by: Ruth Sutton
- Succeeded by: Vanessa Moskal

Personal details
- Born: 24 August 1970 (age 56) Manly, New South Wales, Australia
- Party: Liberal Party
- Spouse: Nicola Constant
- Children: 1
- Education: Saint Ignatius' College, Riverview
- Alma mater: University of Sydney (BAgEc); University of New South Wales (MBA)
- Occupation: Politician
- Website: www.jasonfalinski.com.au
- Nickname: Jase

Jason George Falinski (born 24 August 1970) is an Australian former politician. He was first elected as the Member for Mackellar for the Liberal Party in the Australian House of Representatives at the 2016 Australian election and was re-elected at the 2019 Australian election. He lost his re-election bid in the 2022 Australian federal election to independent candidate Sophie Scamps. During his time in office, Falinski served as Chair of the House of Representatives Standing Committee on Economics, and the Standing Committee on Tax and Revenue. He was elected as President of the New South Wales division of the Liberal Party in 2023.

== Early life ==
Falinski was born on 24 August 1970 in Manly, New South Wales. He is the oldest of four children born to Jill (née Brittain-White) and Stanley Falinski. His father was born in Soviet Kyrgyzstan to Jewish parents originally from Poland and Russia, who had been subject to Soviet population transfers during World War II. His father's family immigrated to Australia from Poland in 1958 to escape post-war antisemitism. On his mother's side, he has English and Irish heritage.

Falinski attended Saint Ignatius' College, Riverview, then graduated from the University of Sydney with a Bachelor of Agricultural Economics. He later completed an MBA at the Australian Graduate School of Management at UNSW Sydney.

== Career ==
Falinski first worked for Smorgons ARC at Dee Why loading and unloading reinforced metal for building companies. Falinski and his brother Tim worked for computer retailer Osborne, of which his father was a co-founder and managing director until its collapse in 1995. After entering politics, Falinski attributed the company's failure to the ALP's economic policies and the early 1990s recession, stating that "the bank took our family home" as a result of the collapse. Contemporary reporting instead attributed the company's failure to "a range of non-recessionary causes", with the administrator stating that "the problems of the company have been largely self-inflicted by the management".

He later worked as an adviser to former Liberal leaders John Hewson and Barry O'Farrell, and was a spokesman for the Australian Republican Movement. He also worked in corporate affairs for Credit Union Services Corporation Limited, and in strategy and mergers and acquisitions for IAG before setting up his own company, CareWell Health, in 2005.

== Early political involvement ==
Falinski was president of the New South Wales branch of the Young Liberals in 1994–1995, and served as the vice-president, in 1996–1996, and president, in 1997–1998, of the Australian Young Liberals.

Falinski was elected to Warringah Council in September 2008 as a Councillor for A Ward.

== Parliamentary career ==
In April 2016, Falinski won an internal Liberal Party preselection ballot in the seat of Mackellar, defeating the incumbent member Bronwyn Bishop. He was elected as Bishop's successor at the 2016 federal election. Falinski was re-elected for a second term at the 2019 federal election, but was defeated by independent candidate Sophie Scamps in the 2022 federal election.

Falinski is a member of the Moderate/Modern Liberal faction of the Liberal Party.

=== Economy ===
Falinski has called for reform of the Australian Taxation Office, stating that the onus of proof should lie with the ATO, not the taxpayer, in relation to allegations of fraud or evasion. He has also called for the introduction of a taxpayer bill of rights, and to empower the tax ombudsman with powers similar to the taxpayer advocate service in the US.

In his capacity as Chair of the Standing Committee on Economics, Falinski has called for the introduction of legislation that would require asset managers, including super funds and index funds, publish shareholder voting decisions to ensure they do not use proxy advisers to collude at shareholder meetings. The committee also recommended that mechanisms be put in place to ensure asset managers engage with their members when making voting decisions, and to require proxy advisers to hold a broader financial service licence than is currently the case.

Falinski supports the development of Australia's retail corporate bond market, noting that Australia's market had been held back by regulatory failure and institutional obstructionism. The Standing Committee on Tax and Revenue noted that the Australian market had less depth, breadth and liquidity than the same market in New Zealand, even though the latter’s capital markets and savings pool are much smaller.

Falinski supports innovation-focussed reform, having chaired an Inquiry into the tax treatment of employee share schemes. In 2021, the Inquiry recommended reforms which were accepted by then Treasurer, Josh Frydenberg, including legislative changes which would allow an employee to leave their job without facing a large tax bill on shares they had been issued. These reforms were welcomed and warmly received by industry groups.

=== Transport ===
Falinski has indicated his support for proposals to extend a metro line from Chatswood to Frenchs Forest to combat congestion on the Northern Beaches.

Falinski is a supporter of the Beaches Link, and has expressed his disappointment at delays to the project due to lacklustre funding commitments from the Government of New South Wales following the resignation of Gladys Berejiklian.

During his time as the member for Mackellar, Falinski consistently campaigned for funding to upgrade Wakehurst Parkway by widening and flood-proofing this critical arterial road. In March 2022, Falinski was successful in securing a $75 million budget commitment from the Commonwealth Government to carry out these upgrades, and this commitment which was matched by the NSW State Government bringing the total investment to $150 million. Following the election of the Albanese Government, the Commonwealth Government withdrew its funding commitments in their October budget update.

=== Environment ===
In October 2021, Falinski was named as one of several moderate Liberal MPs pressuring the Morrison Government to commit to a net-zero by 2050 target in the lead up to COP26, which they ultimately succeeded in doing. Falinski was credited with hosting and convening regular zoom meetings with like-minded colleagues to discuss how they could get the Prime Minister Scott Morrison to commit to their position.

Falinski is staunchly opposed to renewal of Petroleum Exploration Permit – 11 (PEP-11) licence and introduced a notice of motion in the House of Representatives against its renewal. Renewal of the licence, which allows for offshore drilling for gas exploration between Sydney and Newcastle, was opposed by many community groups and MPs however the decision to reject renewal required approval from the Federal and relevant State resources minister. In December 2021 the then Prime Minister Scott Morrison held a press conference indicating that the licence had been cancelled crediting Falinski's advocacy amongst others for his decision.

Morrison's announcement regarding the cancellation of PEP-11 was scrutinised following the defeat of the Morrison Government at the 2022 Australian election, when it emerged the then Prime Minister had secretly had himself sworn in to multiple ministerial portfolios during the COVID-19 pandemic and used this authority to cancel the permit.

Falinski’s electoral defeat in 2022 was part of a broader backlash against Liberal moderates for perceived inaction on key issues. As a self-described Moderate Liberal, Falinski claimed to support stronger climate policy and a federal anti-corruption commission, however during Falinski’s term (2016–2022), the Liberal-National government had no legislated net-zero plan until late 2021 and failed to establish the promised Commonwealth Integrity Commission.

=== Integrity ===
Falinski has called for reform to political advertising laws to ensure truth in advertising laws apply to political parties and candidates. In 2019 Falinski and the Independent member for Warringah, Zali Steggall, made a joint submission to the Joint Standing Committee on Electoral Matters to push for truth in political advertising laws.

Falinski was one of several politicians featured in Craig Reucassel's documentary on political donations and lobbying, Big Deal.

=== Parliamentary diversity ===
In March 2021, Falinski co-wrote an opinion piece with the outgoing member for Boothby, Nicolle Flint MP, calling for the Liberal Party of Australia to consider adopting a candidates list, in a similar vein to the model introduced by David Cameron to the UK Conservatives. This proposal advocates for the administrative wing of the Liberal Party to identify and train potential candidates from a diverse range of backgrounds to improve the calibre and diversity of candidates at elections.

=== Housing ===
As chair of a 2021 federal inquiry into housing supply and affordability, Falinski became a vocal proponent of loosening planning laws to enable more development and bring down house prices. He was later accused of hypocrisy and for opposing a significant housing development at Lizard Rock in his own electorate. Specifically, when the Metropolitan Local Aboriginal Land Council proposed building 450 homes at a site in Belrose (known as the Lizard Rock development), Falinski actively campaigned for more transport infrastructure to accompany any development. He appeared in a video at the Lizard Rock bushland calling for better infrastructure and citing environmental concerns.

== Post-parliamentary career ==
In 2023, Falinski was elected NSW Liberal Party president. During his time as President there was significant internal unease about factional tensions and the collapse of fundraising and membership engagement. Reports in late 2023 and 2024 noted low morale, poor candidate recruitment, and ongoing divisions between the conservative and moderate camps.

In 2024 Jason Falinski became a spokesperson for conservative political advocacy group Australians for Prosperity (AFP). The group describes itself as a grassroots movement promoting “economic freedom, individual empowerment, and responsible governance” in Australia. Australians for Prosperity received $2,738,026 in donations from Coal Australia as well as $940,000 in “other receipts” from the coal group. During the 2025 election, the group spent $414,903 on online ads attacking the Greens, independents and Labor. Falinski serves as the spokesperson for AFP, which has primarily campaigned against progressive candidates – notably Greens and “teal” independent MPs – by focusing on issues of taxation, regulation and opposition to what it views as excessive government intervention. AFP’s campaigns in the 2025 federal election targeted several inner-city and traditionally Liberal-held seats that were won by Greens or teal independents, aligning with Falinski’s stated goal of encouraging voter scrutiny of candidates’ tax and spending policies.

In April 2025, during the federal election campaign, the Australian Electoral Commission (AEC) contacted the Australians for Prosperity regarding social media advertisements that did not carry proper authorisation disclosures (as required by electoral law). In response, the group deleted two months’ of posts from its Facebook and Instagram pages and temporarily deactivated its online ads to ensure compliance. Around the same time, some individuals who had been featured in AFP’s online "vox pop" videos – street interview-style campaign ads – complained that they were not informed their comments would be used in paid political advertising and felt their views were edited misleadingly.

== Controversies ==
In late 2017, Falinski was one of several MPs and Senators who was identified as being potentially ineligible to serve in Parliament due to being in breach of Section 44(i) of the Australian Constitution, in Falinski's case because of his Polish heritage through his father. Falinski provided legal advice indicating he did not hold Polish citizenship and was ultimately not one of the MPs or Senators who were required to resign.

In February 2019, Falinski was directly linked to controversy surrounding the House of Representatives Standing Committee on Economics inquiry into Labor's proposed changes to refundable franking credits. Falinski reportedly wrote to self-managed superannuation fund trustees promoting a $25-per-person Liberal Party fundraising event featuring committee chair Tim Wilson and Liberal candidate Dave Sharma at Dee Why RSL, a venue that had also hosted an inquiry hearing.

Also in 2019, Falinski was accused of misusing research by cherry picking statistics to justify the government imposing a drug testing policy on welfare recipients..

At the 2022 election, Falinski attended a joint event with the Liberal candidate for Warringah, Katherine Deves, who had attracted controversy for comments describing transgender children as "surgically mutilated and sterilised". In May 2022, Falinski had to delete a campaign video after Surf Life Saving NSW complained it breached their apolitical charity rules. In the video a lifesaving club volunteer praised Falinski for his work in securing more resources for the volunteer organisation. Falinski’s pages hosted other videos with members of an RSL and Marine Rescue branch endorsing him for his work in the local community.

== Personal life ==
Falinski lives in Collaroy with his wife Nichola Constant, a Senior Commissioner at the Industrial Relations Commission of New South Wales. Together they have a daughter.

Parliament of Australia
Preceded by Bronwyn Bishop	Member for Mackellar; 2016–2022	Succeeded by Sophie Scamps
