= 1994 Mackellar by-election =

26 March 1994
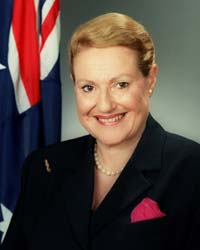
	First party	Second party
		IND
Candidate	Bronwyn Bishop	Bob Ellis
Party	Liberal	Independent
Popular vote	34,999	15,501
Percentage	53.25%	23.14%
Swing	▼4.36	▲23.14
TPP	60.27%	39.73%
TPP swing	▼0.89	▲39.73
MP before election
Jim Carlton
Liberal
Elected MP
Bronwyn Bishop
Liberal

The 1994 Mackellar by-election was held in the Australian electorate of Mackellar in New South Wales on 26 March 1994. The by-election was triggered by the resignation of the sitting member, the Liberal Party of Australia's Jim Carlton on 14 January 1994. The writ for the by-election was issued on 18 February 1994. On the same day a by-election was held in Warringah.

The Australian Labor Party did not stand a candidate for the by-election. The main opposition for the seat was writer/journalist, film-maker, Labor supporter and political commentator Bob Ellis, who stood as an independent.

During the by-elections in Mackellar and Warringah the Maverick Far Right Labor MP Graeme Campbell urged electors to vote for Australians Against Further Immigration (AAFI).

The by-election was won by the Liberal Party's Bronwyn Bishop.

== Results ==
1994 Mackellar by-election
Party	Candidate	Votes	%	±%
Liberal	Bronwyn Bishop	34,999	52.25	−4.36
Independent	Bob Ellis	15,501	23.14	+23.14
AAFI	John Phillips	5,464	8.16	+8.16
Greens	Fiona E. McLeod	3,940	5.88	+5.88
Democrats	Brian Johnson	3,851	5.75	−1.33
Independent	Stephen Ross Wells	2,063	3.08	+3.08
Republican	Peter Consandine	586	0.87	+0.87
	Godfrey Bigot	582	0.87	+0.87
Total formal votes		66,986	96.85	−0.15
Informal votes		2,181	3.15	+0.15
Turnout		69,167	87.63	−8.14
Two-candidate-preferred result
Liberal	Bronwyn Bishop	40,328	60.27	−0.89
Independent	Bob Ellis	26,587	39.73	+39.73
Liberal hold		Swing	N/A	

== See also ==
- List of Australian federal by-elections
