= Bill Wentworth =

Australian politician (1907–2003)

The Honourable Bill Wentworth AO
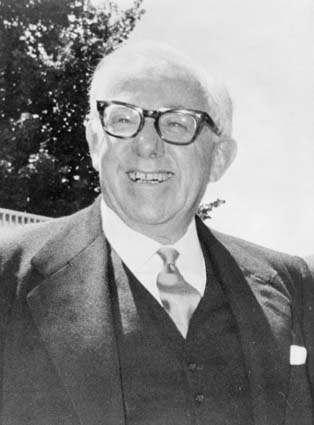

Minister for Social Services
- In office 28 February 1968 – 5 December 1972
- Prime Minister: John Gorton; William McMahon
- Preceded by: Ian Sinclair
- Succeeded by: Bill Hayden

Minister in charge of Aboriginal Affairs under the Prime Minister
- In office 28 February 1968 – 31 May 1971
- Prime Minister: John Gorton; William McMahon
- Preceded by: New Title
- Succeeded by: Peter Howson

Member of the Australian Parliament for Mackellar
- In office 10 December 1949 – 10 December 1977
- Preceded by: Division created
- Succeeded by: Jim Carlton

Personal details
- Born: 8 September 1907 Sydney, New South Wales, Australia
- Died: 15 June 2003 (aged 95) Sydney, New South Wales, Australia
- Party: Independent (1943); Liberal Democratic (1943); Liberal (1945–1977); Independent (after 1977)
- Relations: Mungo MacCallum (nephew)
- Education: New College, Oxford
- Occupation: Politician

William Charles Wentworth AO (8 September 1907 – 15 June 2003), usually known as Bill Wentworth and sometimes referred to as William Charles Wentworth IV, was an Australian politician. He was a member of the Liberal Party for most of his career and held ministerial office in the governments of John Gorton and William McMahon, serving as Minister for Social Services (1968–1972) and Minister in charge of Aboriginal Affairs (1968–1971). Wentworth served in the House of Representatives from 1949 to 1977, representing the New South Wales seat of Mackellar. He frequently crossed the floor and served his final months in parliament as an independent.

== Early life and education ==
Wentworth was born on 8 September 1907 in Sydney, the son of a prominent Sydney barrister of the same name, and the great-grandson of William Charles Wentworth, a leading political and literary figure in colonial New South Wales. He is sometimes referred to as "William Charles Wentworth IV" but he never used this name himself. His family and friends called him Bill or Billy.

Wentworth was educated at Tudor House School in Moss Vale from 1919 to 1921 before moving to The Armidale School in Armidale in northern New South Wales, and at New College, Oxford, where he gained an MA, and a Blue in athletics (he was a half-miler, and ran as first string to the future Olympic champion and world record holder Tom Hampson).

== Public service career ==
Returning to Australia aged 23, Wentworth worked briefly as a factory hand at Lever Brothers in Balmain, Sydney, before becoming Secretary to the Attorney General of New South Wales, Sir Henry Manning. Then he joined the New South Wales public service as an economic advisor to the Premier's Department and the Treasury, a position from which he resigned in 1937 in protest against what he saw as the state conservative government's timid economic policies. He was an early exponent of Keynesianism and favoured an expansion of state credit.

== Early political involvement ==
From 1941 to 1943 Wentworth served in the Australian Army in administrative positions. At the 1943 federal election, he stood as an independent for the House of Representatives seat of Wentworth (named after his great-grandfather), arguing for an all-party "national government". He polled 20 per cent of the vote against United Australia Party incumbent Eric Harrison. However, his preferences allowed Harrison to see off a spirited challenge from Labor candidate Jessie Street.

Later in 1943, Wentworth joined the newly created Liberal Democratic Party and was chairman of its training group. He resigned from the party in December 1943 after coming into conflict with the executive, subsequently accusing party chair Ernest White of behaving in an "undemocratic fashion".

== Federal politics ==
In 1945 Wentworth joined Robert Menzies' new party, the Liberal Party of Australia. At the 1949 election, he was elected to the House of Representatives for Mackellar in the northern suburbs of Sydney.

Wentworth in 1953

By the late 1940s Wentworth had become a fierce anti-Communist, to an extent that even some in his own party regarded as excessive (though Menzies was more than willing to benefit from his frequent red-baiting): he was frequently accused of McCarthyism in making allegations under parliamentary privilege, usually unsubstantiated, of Communist influence in various quarters of Australian public life. He was a leading member of the "Taiwan lobby" in the Liberal Party, which also included Wilfrid Kent Hughes and the young John Gorton. He frequently sought to imply that the leader of the opposition Australian Labor Party, Dr H. V. Evatt, was a communist sympathizer, or at best a dupe of the communists. The communists, he said, wanted to "ride into power on the back of the Australian Labor Party". Menzies's biographer referred to him as "the notorious Liberal Party backbench red-baiter".

Wentworth, however, was more than a one-issue politician, and had great energy and ability. As Gorton's biographer writes: "For all his erratic and sometimes bizarre behaviour, his flaws were at least those of an inventive mind". Despite this, he had a long wait for ministerial preferment, mainly because he was a party-room rebel on other matters, such as pensions. During these years he busied himself with parliamentary committee work. He was an active member of the Foreign Affairs Committee from 1952 to 1961. From 1956 he was chair of the Government Members Committee on Rail Gauge Standardisation. He made important recommendations on solving one of Australia's longest-standing infrastructure problems, the incompatible rail gauges in the different states, a legacy of colonial times. Gough Whitlam, no admirer of Wentworth in other respects, credited him with being one of the architects of the rail standardisation agreement that led to the opening of the single-gauge rail line from Melbourne to Sydney in 1961. On the wider front, however, the head of the South Australian Railways observed that "despite his undoubted enthusiasm for railway matters, Bill Wentworth’s intrusion into the debate and his advocacy for nothing more than inter-capital links doomed forever any chance of an integrated standard gauge rail network being achieved. It is a pity that he ever became involved."

Wentworth's other long-term interest was in Aboriginal affairs. In 1959, he put forth a proposal to Cabinet for the establishment of an Australian Institute of Aboriginal Studies, arguing for a more comprehensive approach by the government to recording Aboriginal and Torres Strait Islander peoples and cultures. The institute was established by an Act of Parliament in 1964 and is now known as the Australian Institute of Aboriginal and Torres Strait Islander Studies (AIATSIS). He was one of the Liberal backbenchers who supported a constitutional referendum to give the Commonwealth the power to legislate specifically for the benefit of Indigenous Australians, something which was finally achieved under Menzies' successor Harold Holt in 1967 (via the 1967 referendum). When Wentworth's friend Gorton succeeded Holt, he made Wentworth Minister for Social Services and Minister in Charge of Aboriginal Affairs, the first minister to hold this office.

As Minister, Wentworth was disappointed that the Cabinet was reluctant to take any steps to pass the kind of far-reaching legislation he wanted, mainly due to the resistance of pastoral interests represented by the Country Party. Nevertheless, Wentworth took the first practical step towards the granting of Indigenous land rights when he proposed giving the Gurindji people control of their land at Wave Hill Station in the Northern Territory (which was at that time under Commonwealth control): this scheme, in a fine irony given Wentworth's history, was denounced as "communist inspired" by the Cattle Producers Council (a reference to the fact that the Communist writer Frank Hardy was an adviser to the Gurindji).

Wentworth was already 60 when he became a minister, but he proved to be energetic and innovative. When William McMahon succeeded Gorton as Prime Minister in March 1971, he retained Wentworth in the ministry despite dropping Gorton's other proteges. Wentworth contested the Liberal deputy leadership at this time, but was eliminated on the first ballot, with the position going to Billy Snedden, whom Wentworth regarded as a light-weight. When the McMahon government was defeated by Labor under Whitlam in December 1972, Wentworth returned to the backbench.

Snedden succeeded McMahon as leader, but Wentworth was among his most persistent party-room critics. In March 1975 it was Wentworth who moved the motion in the Liberal Party room to depose Snedden from the leadership in favour of Malcolm Fraser. But under Fraser's government he soon found himself back in his old role of the backbench rebel. His lifelong commitment to Keynesianism led him to criticise Fraser's cuts to government spending as deflationary. Having already announced his intention of retiring from Parliament at the next election, he resigned from the Liberal Party on 11 October 1977, citing the government's handling of the economy and industrial relations. He stood for the Senate in New South Wales at the December 1977 election, polling 2.1 per cent of the vote. Later he was active in the Grey Power movement, and stood again for the Senate as a Grey Power candidate at the 1984 election; again, he did badly.

Wentworth's last appearance in Australian politics was in April 1995, when he contested the by-election in the seat of Wentworth (which was named after his great-grandfather) caused by the resignation of Dr John Hewson. In the absence of a Labor candidate, he polled 18 per cent of the vote, 52 years after he first contested the seat in 1943.

During his time in the House of Representatives, Wentworth voted against his party more often than any other Representative in Australian history.

== Honours ==
In 1993, Wentworth was appointed an Officer (AO) of the Order of Australia in the Queen's Birthday Honours for "service to the Australian Parliament, particularly in relation to Aboriginal rights and to the standardisation of inter-state rail gauges".

== Later life, death and family ==
Wentworth retired to north Queensland, from where he continued to write pamphlets and newspaper articles until his death in Sydney in 2003 at the age of 95.

He was survived by his wife Barbara, and four children. The prominent journalist Mungo MacCallum is his nephew.

== Publications ==
- Referendum and Reform: The Upper House in New South Wales Deaton & Spencer, Sydney, 1933
- Demand for defence: being a plan to keep Australia white and free Sydney, W.C. Wentworth, 1939
- Labor, Socialism and Soviets: the Trend to Totalitarianism in Australia: The Place of Bank Nationalisation in the Plan Compress Printing Limited, Sydney, 1947

== Ancestry ==
Ancestors of Bill Wentworth

8. William Charles Wentworth
4. Fitzwilliam Wentworth
9. Sarah Cox
2. William Charles Wentworth
10. George Hill M.L.C.
5. Mary Jane Hill
11. Jane Binnie
1. William Charles Wentworth
12. George Richard Griffiths
6. George Neville Griffiths M.L.A.
13. Letitia Chatfield
3. Florence Denise Griffiths
14. John Scott M.L.A. and M.L.C
7. Ada Frances Scott
15. Agnes Thomson

== See also ==
- Political families of Australia: Wentworth/Hill/Griffiths/Scott/Cooper family
- Wentworth family

Political offices
Preceded by Ian Sinclair	Minister for Social Services; 1968–72	Succeeded by Bill Hayden
New title	Minister for Aboriginal Affairs; 1968–1971	Succeeded by Peter Howson
Parliament of Australia
New division	Member for Mackellar; 1949–1977	Succeeded by Jim Carlton
