= Jonathan King (historian) =

Australian historian (born 1942)

- Born: Jonathan Leslie Essington King; 28 December 1942 (age 83); Geelong, Victoria
- Occupations: Historian and journalist
- Writing career
- Language: English
- Years active: 1995–

Jonathan Leslie Essington King, OAM (born 28 December 1942) is an Australian historian, author and journalist. He has written 30 books in a 40-year career, mostly on Australian history, including a number of works on the Anzacs. King has also written thousands of articles for Australian newspapers and magazines, produced and presented numerous television documentary films, and acted as resident historian on many radio programs.

In 1977, King proposed and organised the First Fleet Re-enactment Voyage to commemorate the Australian Bicentenary in 1988. As the Australian Bicentenary Authority and the Australian government declined to support the project, King set up the voyage as a private venture and obtained corporate sponsorship for the re-enactment, as well as state government grants and public donations.

In October 2002, King attended a conference in Turkey called "Australia in Peace and War" at which historians discussed Gallipoli and the Anzac legend. As history correspondent for The Australian newspaper, King wrote an article for the paper titled "Charge of the rewrite brigade", which stated that the conference had concluded that Australians should reframe the Gallipoli Campaign as an "unmitigated disaster" and apologise to the Turkish government for invading their country. The claims in the article provoked controversy in Australia and New Zealand. Jenny Macleod in her essay "Beckham, Waugh and the Memory of Gallipoli" in the book New Zealand's Great War asserts that King mis-attributed quotes, and mis-represented the "broader political edge" of the conference.

In April 2018, Fairfax Media published a correction and apology for numerous factual errors published in King's article in Fairfax newspapers about John Monash and the Battle of Villers-Bretonneux.

King is also an environmental campaigner, having held positions with the Australian Conservation Foundation and running several times for office as a Democrats and Greens candidate.

King was awarded the Medal of the Order of Australia in the 2022 Queen's Birthday Honours for "service to community history".

== Books ==
=== Great Moments in Australian History ===
Great Moments in Australian History (2009) describes 66 events from the early colonial period through the Eureka Rebellion and Gallipoli to Kevin Rudd's apology to the "Stolen Generations".

=== Great Battles in Australian History ===
Great Battles in Australian History (2011) runs from the Battle of Vinegar Hill through the Boer War and the many First World War and Second World War battles involving Australians, before covering Korea, Vietnam, and Afghanistan. It was praised by Weekly Times (Australia) for its organisation, explanation of the importance of battles, and the "immediacy and energy" of his descriptions of battles: although they found the content predictable the presentation was good.
