= The Rugby Club =

Australian licensed club & restaurant in Sydney

The Rugby Club (rebranded as The Rugby Club Sydney) was a rugby union-themed Australian licensed club and restaurant filled with sports memorabilia. Once located in Rugby Place on Pitt Street, in Sydney, New South Wales, Australia, it was formed in 1945. Professional rugby union players frequent the restaurant when touring in Australia, a rite of passage in the rugby community.

In 2015 the property was sold for $21 million. The money was used to create The Rugby Club Foundation.

== History ==
The Rugby Club was formed in 1945 and was originally the Headquarters of the New South Wales Rugby Union and later the Australian Rugby Union and was where Wallabies touring teams were presented their jerseys. It was also where the Australian Rugby Union and New Zealand Rugby Union Boards agreed to establish the Rugby World Cup and later the Super Rugby and Tri-Nations competitions and the clubhouse of Sydney Harlequins who Participate in the New South Wales Suburban Rugby Union.
