= Division of Mackellar =

Australian federal electoral division

Coordinates: 33.669°S 151.253°E

Mackellar Australian House of Representatives Division
- Interactive map of electorate boundaries from the 2025 federal election
- Created: 1949
- MP: Sophie Scamps
- Party: Independent
- Namesake: Sir Charles Mackellar; Dorothea Mackellar
- Electors: 129,396 (2025)
- Area: 222 km^{2} (85.7 sq mi)
- Demographic: Outer metropolitan
Electorates around Mackellar:
Berowra	Robertson	Tasman Sea
Bradfield	Mackellar	Tasman Sea
Bradfield	Warringah	Tasman Sea

The Division of Mackellar is an Australian electoral division in the state of New South Wales. It is located in the Northern Beaches region of Sydney. Since 2022, it has been held by independent MP Sophie Scamps.

== History ==
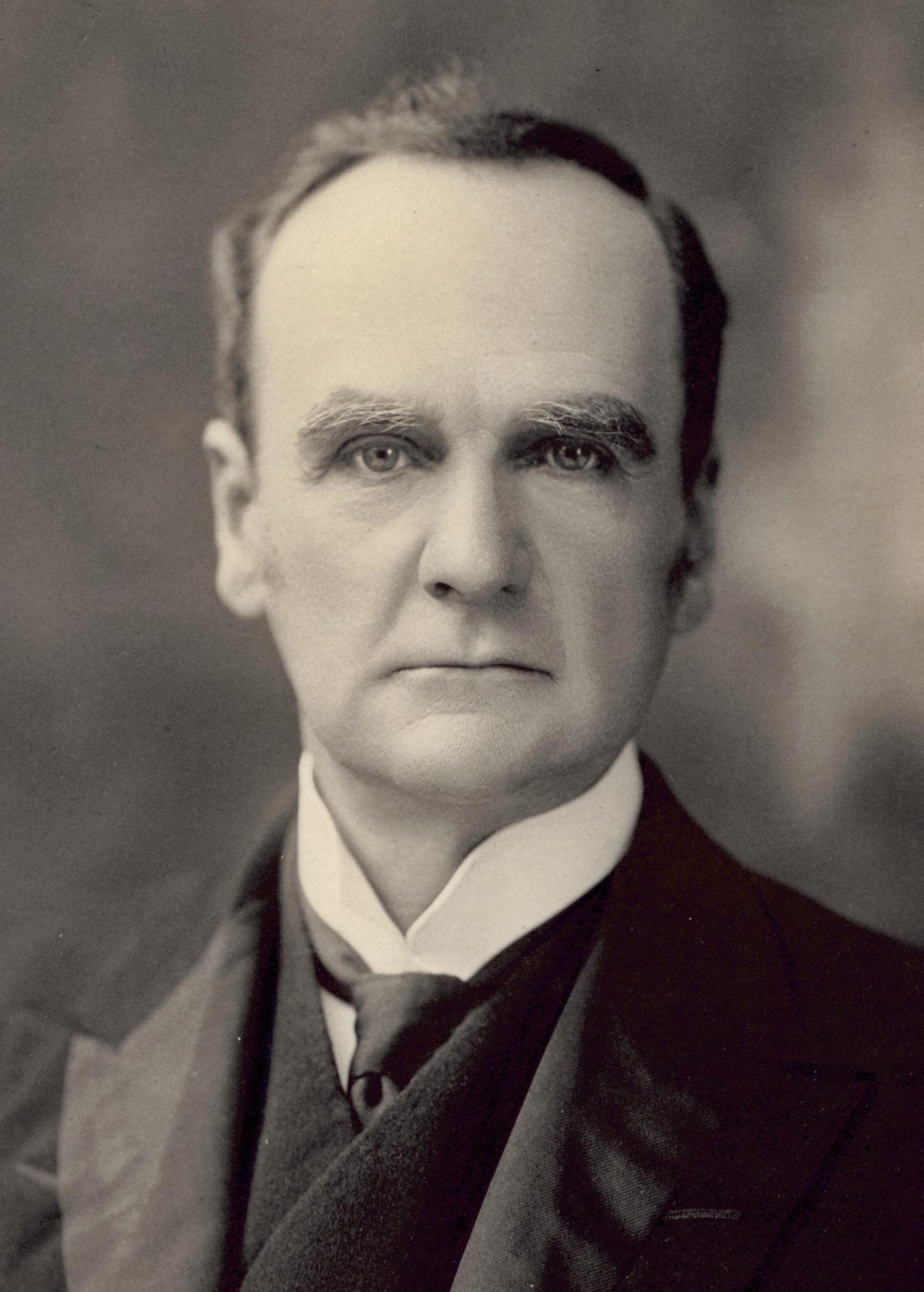
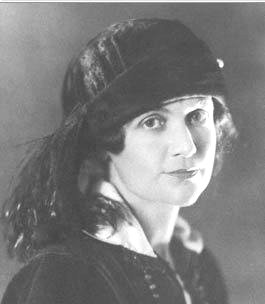
Sir Charles and Dorothea Mackellar, the division's namesakes

The division is named after Sir Charles Mackellar, a social reformer and surgeon who served in the Senate from October to November 1903, and his daughter Dorothea Mackellar, a 20th-century Australian poet. The division was proclaimed at the redistribution of 11 May 1949, and was first contested at the 1949 federal election. It was first held by Bill Wentworth, the first Minister for Aboriginal Affairs, and the great-grandson of politician and explorer William Wentworth, one of the first three Europeans to cross the Blue Mountains.

Like most seats in northern Sydney, Mackellar was a safe seat for the Liberal Party of Australia for the majority of its history. Prior to 2022, for all but two months of its existence, the seat was held by Liberal MPs; Wentworth briefly sat as an independent for the last two months of his term. The territory covered by the electorate had been represented by the Liberals and their predecessors for most of its history since Federation; it was part of North Sydney before 1922, and then part of Warringah from 1922 to 1949.

In 1972, Wentworth only tallied 55.2 percent of the two party vote. This election was also the first time the Liberals had come up short of winning enough votes on the first count to win the seat outright. It would be half a century before the Liberals' hold on the seat would be seriously threatened again.

Former Speaker of the House of Representatives Bronwyn Bishop held the seat from 1994 until 2016, when she lost a preselection contest for the Liberal nomination following an expenses scandal. The Liberal Party preselected Jason Falinski to contest the seat, who won both the 2016 and 2019 Federal elections.

At the 2022 federal election, a Liberal candidate lost the election for the first time in the seat's history. Falinski lost over 11 percent of his primary vote from 2019, and was unseated by teal independent Sophie Scamps as part of a wave of Liberal losses in wealthy metropolitan seats. In 2025, Scamps retained Mackellar with a swing in her favour of 3.9 points. Meanwhile, the Liberals set a new record low for their two-party-preferred vote against Labor in this seat. Following the election, it sits at 53.7 percent, below the 1972 result.

== Geography ==
Mackellar is located in the Northern Beaches region of Sydney, adjacent to the Tasman Sea, south of Broken Bay and the Hawkesbury River. The division includes the suburbs of Akuna Bay, Avalon Beach, Bayview, Belrose, Bilgola Beach, Bilgola Plateau, Careel Bay, Church Point, Clareville, Coasters Retreat, Collaroy, Collaroy Plateau, Cottage Point, Cromer, Davidson, Dee Why, Duffys Forest, Elanora Heights, Elvina Bay, Forestville, Great Mackerel Beach, Ingleside, Killarney Heights, Lovett Bay, McCarrs Creek, Mona Vale, Morning Bay, Narrabeen, Newport, North Curl Curl, North Narrabeen, Oxford Falls, Palm Beach, Scotland Island, Terrey Hills, Towlers Bay, Warriewood, Whale Beach and Wheeler Heights; as well as parts of Beacon Hill, Frenchs Forest and Narraweena.

Since 1984, federal electoral division boundaries in Australia have been determined at redistributions by a redistribution committee appointed by the Australian Electoral Commission. Redistributions occur for the boundaries of divisions in a particular state, and they occur every seven years, or sooner if a state's representation entitlement changes or when divisions of a state are malapportioned.

== Members ==
Image	Member	Party	Term	Notes
	Bill Wentworth (1907–2003)	Liberal	10 December 1949 – 11 October 1977	Served as minister under Gorton and McMahon. Did not contest in 1977. Failed to win a Senate seat.
	Bill Wentworth (1907–2003)	Independent	11 October 1977 – 10 December 1977	Served as minister under Gorton and McMahon. Did not contest in 1977. Failed to win a Senate seat.
	Jim Carlton (1935–2015)	Liberal	10 December 1977 – 14 January 1994	Served as minister under Fraser. Resigned to retire from politics
	Bronwyn Bishop (1942–)	Liberal	26 March 1994 – 9 May 2016	Previously a member of the Senate. Served as minister under Howard. Served as Speaker during the Abbott Government. Lost preselection and retired
	Jason Falinski (1970–)	Liberal	2 July 2016 – 21 May 2022	Lost seat
	Sophie Scamps (1971–)	Independent	21 May 2022 – present	Incumbent

== Election results ==
2025 Australian federal election: Mackellar
Party	Candidate	Votes	%	±%
Independent	Sophie Scamps	42,482	37.98	+4.26
Liberal	James Brown	39,647	35.45	−5.06
Labor	Jeffrey Quinn	13,499	12.07	+3.70
Greens	Ethan Hrnjak	6,858	6.13	−0.21
One Nation	Brad Hayman	2,825	2.53	−0.13
Independent	Lisa Cotton	2,297	2.05	+2.05
Libertarian	Justin Addison	1,949	1.74	+1.74
Trumpet of Patriots	Amber Robertson	1,588	1.42	+1.42
Independent	Mandeep Singh	702	0.63	+0.63
Total formal votes		111,847	92.63	−3.61
Informal votes		8,894	7.37	+3.61
Turnout		120,741	93.35	+1.66
Notional two-party-preferred count
Liberal	James Brown	60,014	53.66	−4.21
Labor	Jeffrey Quinn	51,833	46.34	+4.21
Two-candidate-preferred result
Independent	Sophie Scamps	62,255	55.66	+3.89
Liberal	James Brown	49,592	44.34	−3.89
Independent hold		Swing	+3.89	
