= Bronwyn Bishop =

Australian politician (born 1942)

The Honourable Bronwyn Bishop AO
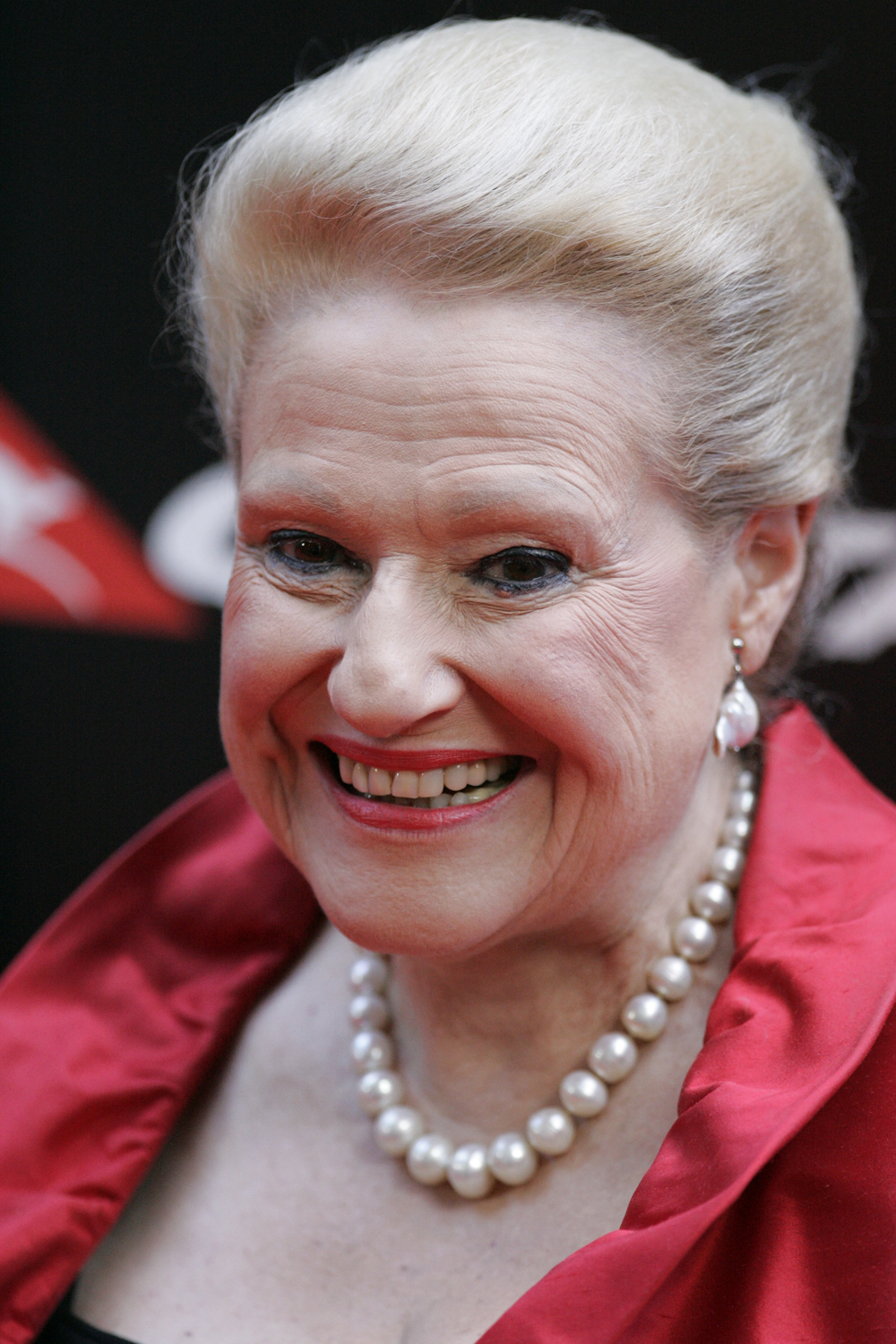
- Bishop in 2012

29th Speaker of the Australian House of Representatives
- In office 12 November 2013 – 2 August 2015
- Deputy: Bruce Scott
- Preceded by: Anna Burke
- Succeeded by: Tony Smith

Minister for Aged Care
- In office 21 October 1998 – 26 November 2001
- Prime Minister: John Howard
- Preceded by: Peter Staples
- Succeeded by: Kevin Andrews

Minister for Defence Industry, Science and Personnel
- In office 11 March 1996 – 21 October 1998
- Prime Minister: John Howard
- Preceded by: Gary Punch
- Succeeded by: Warren Snowdon

Member of the Australian Parliament for Mackellar
- In office 26 March 1994 – 9 May 2016
- Preceded by: Jim Carlton
- Succeeded by: Jason Falinski

Senator for New South Wales
- In office 11 July 1987 – 24 February 1994
- Preceded by: Sir John Carrick
- Succeeded by: Bob Woods

Personal details
- Born: Bronwyn Kathleen Setright; 19 October 1942 (age 84) North Sydney, New South Wales, Australia
- Party: Liberal
- Spouse: Alan David Bishop (m. 1966; div. 1992)
- Education: Cremorne Girls High School; University of Sydney (no degree)
- Occupation: Solicitor and company director

Bronwyn Kathleen Bishop AO (née Setright; born 19 October 1942) is an Australian former politician who served as the 29th speaker of the Australian House of Representatives from 2013 to 2015, during the Abbott government. Her service of almost 30 years as a member of the federal parliament is the longest of any woman in Australia. A member of the Liberal Party of Australia, she served as a senator for New South Wales from 1987 to 1994 after which she became the member of parliament (MP) for the division of Mackellar from 1994 to 2016. During her time in parliament she served as the minister for Defence Industry from 1996 to 1998 and minister for Aged Care from 1998 to 2001 under Prime Minister John Howard.

Bishop was born in Sydney and worked as a lawyer before entering politics. She served as state president of the New South Wales Liberals from 1985 to 1987, and then won election to the Senate at the 1987 federal election. She became the state's second female senator and the first to be popularly elected. In 1994 Bishop switched to the House of Representatives, winning a by-election for the Division of Mackellar. She was a shadow minister under John Hewson, Alexander Downer, and John Howard.

In 1996 Bishop was appointed Minister for Defence Industry, Science and Personnel in the newly elected Howard government. She was made Minister for Aged Care in 1998, but lost her place in the ministry after the 2001 election. Bishop returned to the shadow ministry after the Liberal–National Coalition lost the 2007 election. In 2013, following the election of the Abbott government, she was elected Speaker of the House, becoming the first non-Labor woman to hold the post. She resigned in mid-2015 after being caught in the centre of a travel-expenses scandal, and was defeated for Liberal preselection at the 2016 election, ending her parliamentary career. Since 2016, she has been a political commentator at Sky News Live.

== Early years and education ==
Bronwyn Kathleen Setright was born on 19 October 1942 at the Mater Hospital in North Sydney. Her father, Thomas Francis Setright (1909–1999), was an engineer, and her mother was Kathleen Annie Congreve (1912–1986), an opera singer who worked as a dramatic soprano at the Australian Opera Company. As a child, Bishop was sent to singing lessons by her mother.

Bishop was educated at Roseville Public School, completing her primary education in 1954. She then attended secondary school at Cremorne Girls High School, graduating in 1959. In 1960, Bishop enrolled in a five-year Bachelor of Laws program at the Sydney Law School, University of Sydney. However, she was deemed ineligible to continue her studies at the university after failing a number of subjects multiple times. Bishop failed a total of 11 subjects over six years. In her first year in 1960, she failed all four core subjects. In 1964, she failed four subjects again and repeated them in 1965, in which she failed three again. The policy of the University of Sydney at the time was that a student was required to show cause why they should be allowed to repeat a subject for a third time, and Bishop was deemed ineligible to continue.

During her university years, Bishop was not involved in student politics but was a member of the Killara branch of the Young Liberals. After leaving university, Bishop used the university subjects she had passed to apply for the Solicitors’ Admission Board (now the Legal Profession Admission Board) and was admitted to practise law as a solicitor in New South Wales in 1967. Bishop first worked as an articled clerk and then as a solicitor from 1967. She played an acting role as a barrister in the 1960s Australian television program Divorce Court.

== Politics ==
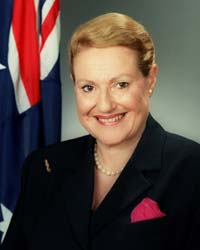
Bishop early in her political career

Having formed an ambition to become a politician, she joined the Liberal Party at the age of 17.

Heavily involved in organised politics, Bishop joined Killara Young Liberals in 1961 and during her association with that branch, she became vice-president. She first became a Liberal Party office-holder in 1973 as president of the Balmoral branch and was later elected as the chairman of the Liberal Party Convention Committee from 1981 to 1985 and as the first female president of the NSW Liberals from 1985 to 1987.

She is formerly a member of the National Right faction of the Liberal Party.

=== Senator (1987–1994) ===
At the 1987 federal election, Bishop was elected to the Senate in the fifth position on the Coalition's ticket in New South Wales. She was effectively a one-to-one replacement for Sir John Carrick, who was retiring from politics. She was the second woman to serve as a senator for New South Wales, and the first to be popularly elected; Sue West had been appointed to a casual vacancy a few months earlier, but had failed to retain her seat. Bishop was elevated to the shadow ministry by Andrew Peacock in 1989, as Shadow Minister for Public Administration, Federal Affairs and Local Government (1989–1990). She proved an aggressive debater against the Australian Labor Party, particularly with Foreign Minister Gareth Evans, who during one debate in 1992 exclaimed to the chamber "I am reminded of the exchange I heard recently in Parliament House when someone said, 'Why do so many people take an instant dislike to Senator Bishop?' to which the answer was, 'It saves time'."

=== Move to the House of Representatives ===
After the Coalition lost the 1993 election, speculation began to mount over John Hewson's future as leader of the Liberal Party. From that time through to early 1994, a series of opinion polls showed Bishop to be among the most popular politicians in the country. She consistently polled ahead of Hewson as preferred Liberal leader, and a February 1994 poll gave her a 13-point lead as preferred prime minister over Paul Keating.

Shortly after the 1993 election, Jim Carlton, the Liberal member for Mackellar, resigned. In a move widely seen as furthering her leadership ambitions, Bishop resigned from the Senate on 24 February 1994 to contest the ensuing by-election for the safe Liberal seat. Although she was comfortably elected, her planned challenge to Hewson's leadership faced a setback when she did not poll as well as expected against author and filmmaker Bob Ellis, who ran as an independent in the by-election. When Hewson called a spill for the Liberal leadership in 1994, Bishop opted not to stand as a candidate, and Alexander Downer successfully challenged for the party leadership.

Prior to his ousting by Downer, Hewson brought Bishop back to the frontbench as she had declined a frontbench position from him the previous year. Hewson appointed her as Shadow Minister for Urban and Regional Strategy.

The 1993 frontbench offer that Bishop had declined was as Shadow Minister for Privatisation and Administrative Affairs, a position in the Shadow Outer Ministry.

She declined this position as she felt it was an insult to a woman of her talent and dedication. A talent and dedication she felt would only be reflected by being a member of the Shadow Cabinet which she had demanded but was not acceded to by Hewson. On refusing Privatisation and Administrative Affairs she says that she was not willing to put up with a junior portfolio of "limited interest."

This portfolio now renamed Privatisation and Administrative Services went instead to David Connolly.

When Downer became leader, Bishop became Shadow Health Minister, a senior position, but caused controversy on her first day in office by announcing her support for tobacco advertising, drawing criticism from both the Australian Medical Association and her own party, which supported the Keating government's legislation to prohibit tobacco advertising in 1992. Her remarks were attacked by the then AMA president and soon-to-be Liberal MP for the neighbouring seat of Bradfield, Brendan Nelson, who said that: "Mrs Bishop has a lot to learn about health...there are now more than 50,000 pieces of medical research and literature supporting the view that smoking is injurious to humans." Bishop was dropped from Health and moved to Privatisation and Commonwealth/State Relations (1995–1996).

=== Howard government (1996–2007) ===
When the Liberals returned to Government in 1996, Prime Minister John Howard appointed Bishop a minister in junior portfolios. She was the first Liberal woman from New South Wales to become a minister. She was Minister for Defence Industry, Science and Personnel from 11 March 1996 to 21 October 1998 and Minister for Aged Care from 21 October 1998 to 26 November 2001. It was in this role that she endured her greatest scandal, the kerosene baths controversy of 2000. The revelation that some residents at Melbourne's Riverside Private Nursing Home had suffered blistering after being bathed in a weak kerosene solution as a cure for scabies led to a national outcry over the standards of care maintained by Bishop's department. She was dropped from the ministry after the 2001 election. On 1 January 2001, Bishop was presented with the Centenary Medal "For service to Australian society through parliament and government". In 2004, she campaigned to succeed Neil Andrew as Speaker of the House, but was not successful.

An affirmed monarchist, Bishop, along with fellow ministers Nick Minchin and Tony Abbott, supported the "No" campaign leading up to the failed 1999 Republican referendum and on one occasion spoke to Australians for Constitutional Monarchy, warning of the "Seven deadly myths of the republican debate". On 17 July 1991, in response to the infamous debate on the Nine Network's Midday television show with host Ray Martin, debating on Australia remaining a constitutional monarchy, in a live televised debate with singer Normie Rowe and radio broadcaster Ron Casey, who ended up physically brawling, Bishop issued a media release which said: "It may well have been High Noon on the Midday Show when Ron Casey took a swipe at Normie Rowe but this conduct indicates just how divisive the debate on the Monarchy has become. Not content to see the country on its knees as a result of the recession the Labor Party must be pleased that it is dividing the community on an issue which has absolutely no political relevance."

In August 2005, Bishop called for Muslim headscarves to be banned from public schools, an opinion also expressed by another prominent Liberal backbencher, Sophie Mirabella. However, the Prime Minister, John Howard, said that he did not agree with this view as a ban would be impractical. In November 2005, Bishop expressed the view that "she is opposed to the wearing of the Muslim headscarf, where it does not form part of the school uniform. This is because that in most cases the headscarf is being worn as a sign of defiance and difference between non-Muslim and Muslim students" and then went on to say that she "does not believe that a ban on the Jewish skull cap is necessary, because people of the Jewish faith have not used the skull cap as a way of campaigning against the Australian culture, laws and way of life."

On 21 January 2006, at a Young Liberals convention in Sydney, Bishop declared her intention to introduce a private members bill to make "destroying or violating" the Australian flag a federal offence. Shortly before the Howard government lost office, Bishop headed the House of Representatives Standing Committee on Family and Human Services, and released the report "The winnable war on drugs: The impact of illicit drug use on families". The report was highly critical of harm minimisation and suggested mandatory adoption of children under 5 years of age whose parents were known to use drugs. The report was widely criticised by a range of organisations such as Family Drug Support, the Australian Democrats and the Australian Drug Foundation for lacking evidence, being ideologically driven, and having the potential to do massive harm to Australia.

In 2006, following a flag-burning incident during the 2005 Cronulla riots and a burnt flag display by a Melbourne artist, Bishop introduced the Protection of the Australian National Flag (Desecration of the Flag) Bill 2006. This bill sought to make it "a criminal offence to wilfully destroy or otherwise mutilate the Flag in circumstances where a reasonable person would infer that the destruction or mutilation is intended publicly to express contempt or disrespect for the Flag or the Australian Nation." The bill received a second reading but subsequently lapsed and did not go to vote in the House of Representatives.

=== Opposition (2007–2013) ===
In the 2007 federal election, Bishop was re-elected to her seat with a 0.62-point primary swing and 3.04-point two-party-preferred swing against her on slightly redistributed boundaries. After his appointment as Liberal Leader, Brendan Nelson appointed Bishop to the Shadow Ministry portfolio of Veterans' Affairs.

Nelson bringing back Bishop to the frontbench was in contrast to their past conflict in 1994 when Bishop as Shadow Health Minister defended tobacco advertising which was contrary to the position taken by Nelson, then President of the Australian Medical Association (AMA).

However, after the election of Malcolm Turnbull as leader of the Liberal Party, she was dropped from this portfolio, to return to the backbench. Despite speculation that she would be challenged for preselection in her seat of Mackellar for the next election, this did not eventuate and she later reaffirmed her intention to contest the next election. On 5 May 2009, Bishop criticised Turnbull's leadership, saying "Malcolm seems to have been strong at the beginning but now he has gone soft." However, with Turnbull's loss of the party leadership and the election of Tony Abbott as his successor, on 8 December 2009 Bishop was appointed as Shadow Minister for Seniors. Bishop was re-elected at the 2010 Election and was appointed to the outer shadow ministry as Shadow Special Minister of State and Shadow Minister for Seniors. In April 2011, Bishop stated that she believed former Prime Minister John Howard's decision to include an emissions trading scheme (ETS) in the 2007 Coalition policy platform was a mistake. She went on to question humans' contribution to the warming of the planet, suggesting that "climate changes continually, and if we have got to do something about it we have got to learn to adapt".

=== Speaker of the House (2013–2015) ===
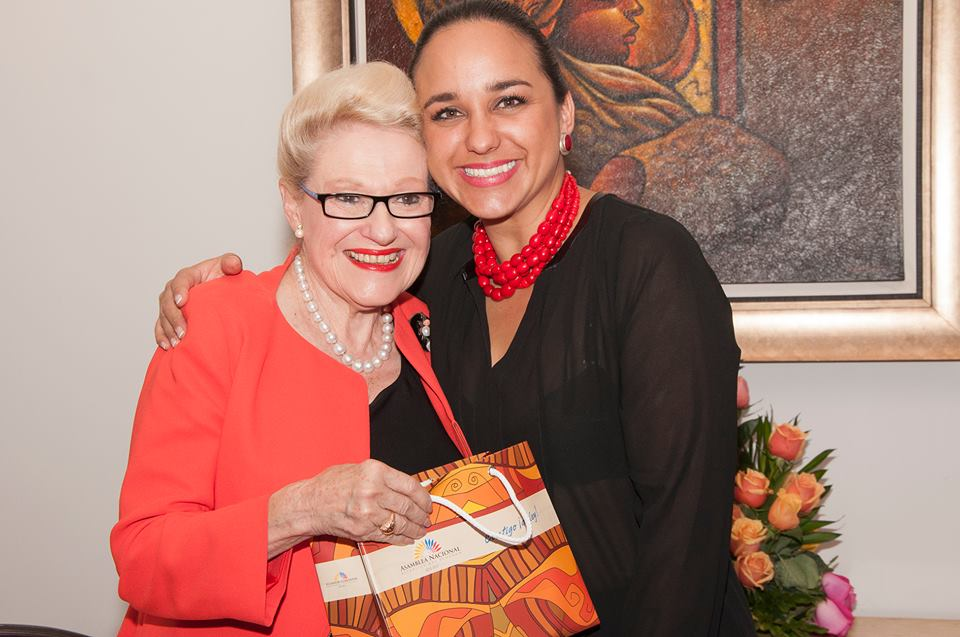
Bishop with Gabriela Rivadeneira, her Ecuadorian counterpart, at the Asia Pacific Parliamentary Forum in 2015

Following the Coalition victory at the federal election on 7 September 2013, Tony Abbott announced Bishop as the Coalition's nominee as next Speaker of the Australian House of Representatives. Bishop was elected as Speaker on 12 November 2013. Her tenure was largely concurrent with the premiership of Abbott. She was the third woman, and the first non-Labor woman, to hold the post. She was also the first former senator to become Speaker of the lower house. She opted against wearing the full traditional attire of the Speaker like her predecessor Peter Slipper, instead continuing to wear ordinary business attire.

In October 2014, Bishop became the longest-serving woman in the history of the Australian Parliament, outstripping the record of 27 years and 3 months previously held by Kathy Sullivan. In November 2014 Bishop lost her bid for presidency of the Inter-Parliamentary Union.

Bishop received significant criticism for her partisanship and claims of bias as speaker. The speaker's role is expected to be nonpartisan. The perception of bias led to the opposition unsuccessfully attempting to move a motion of no confidence in Bishop's speakership in 2014. During her tenure in the chair, Bishop ejected Labor MPs from the House 393 times, but Coalition MPs only seven times. In particular, Bishop ejected 18 MPs from the chamber during a sitting of the House of Representatives on the 27th of November, 2014, prompting then-Manager of Opposition Business, Tony Burke to point out: "At risk of adding to the total, I should point out that 18 members in one sitting is an all-time record since Federation". Bishop had also continued to attend Liberal party room meetings during her speakership, despite convention against this.

==== Expenses controversy and resignation ====
In mid-July 2015, Bishop became embroiled in the "Choppergate" expenses scandal surrounding her use of parliamentary travel entitlements that ultimately led to her resignation as Speaker. It had emerged that she had chartered helicopter flights from Melbourne to Geelong and back to attend a state Liberal Party fundraiser on 5 November 2014. The cost of the flights was $5,227.27 for a journey that typically takes an hour each way by road. Bishop refused to resign over the expenses claim, describing it as an "error of judgement", while expressing disappointment that the controversy had become a distraction from the opposition and its policies. However, she agreed to pay back the sum of the helicopter flight plus a penalty of $1,307.

The controversy was fuelled by further revelations of spending on travel. In 2014, Bishop and four parliamentary delegates spent $88,084 on a two-week trip to Europe in her bid for presidency of the Inter-Parliamentary Union, including almost $1,000 a day on private limousines. Bishop also incurred costs of over $3,300 for car expenses in order to attend the opera and other arts events from 2010 to 2013 and $800 for flights to the wedding of Sophie Mirabella in Albury.

In response to the controversy, Tony Abbott declared Bishop was on what he termed "probation", calling her behaviour "out of line", though maintaining his confidence in the Speaker. A transcript of Tony Abbott's comments calling for Prime Minister Julia Gillard to make Peter Slipper resign over a travel expenses scandal was also removed from the Liberal Party's website. On 31 July, Tony Abbott announced that the Department of Finance would be reviewing all expenses claimed by Bishop over the past 10 years, including the $800,000 claimed during 2014.

Bowing to political pressure, Bishop resigned the speakership on 2 August 2015 and moved to the backbench. Commentators noted that Prime Minister Abbott would have had to deal with the probability that "a significant number of government MPs would not support her in a no-confidence motion."

Bishop repaid over $6,700 after an investigation into her finances, but did not give the Department of Finance enough information about her engagements for them to determine whether they were a legitimate use of taxpayer funds or not. She said that she would no longer be cooperating with the review after her retirement from the parliament. Bishop had provided statements for the financial years 2005–06, 2006–07 and 2013–14.

==== Return to the backbench ====
Though it was initially speculated that the 73-year-old MP would leave parliament at the 2016 federal election, Bishop announced in December 2015 her intent to recontest her seat of Mackellar, claiming she had been "exonerated" over the "Choppergate" expenses scandal, and that the "threat of terrorism" had convinced her she needs to remain in Parliament. Support from the local Liberal branches in her seat had been "dented" following revelations she voted for Malcolm Turnbull in the September 2015 Liberal leadership spill before unsuccessfully lobbying senior Liberals for a ministry in the Turnbull government, a charge which a cabinet minister confirmed but was denied by Bishop. In challenges for preselection, candidate Walter Villatora was endorsed by Mike Baird and Tony Abbott to replace Bishop, and former Wallaby player Bill Calcraft was endorsed by Alan Jones. Bishop was eventually defeated by Jason Falinski by 51 votes to 39. Falinski retained Mackellar for the Liberals at the 2016 election.

== After politics ==
Bishop joined Sky News Live as a political contributor in June 2016, making her debut on Speers Tonight on 2 June 2016.

In November 2016, Bishop attended a party at The Rugby Club in Sydney to celebrate the victory of Donald Trump in the 2016 United States presidential election.

On 26 November 2018, her official Speaker's painting was hung in Parliament House. It was painted by Jiawei Shen and was attended by Prime Minister Scott Morrison, Speaker of the House Tony Smith, her family and other members of the Liberal Party of Australia including the Liberal Chief Whip, Nola Marino.

Bishop was made an Officer of the Order of Australia in the 2020 Queen's Birthday Honours, for distinguished service to the Parliament of Australia, to the people of New South Wales, and to women in politics.

== Personal life ==
Bishop is an amateur actress, having appeared in several charity productions including The Sound of Music (as Baroness Elsa), and Grease (as the Headmistress). In 2007, she sang a duet of Irving Berlin's A Couple of Swells with then Health Minister, Tony Abbott, and Deputy Leader of the Liberal Party, Julie Bishop, at a fund-raiser in Sydney. Bishop is also a patron of Opera Australia and was 2008 President of the Sydney International Piano Competition Committee.

In 1966, she married Alan David Bishop (20 April 1940 – 22 January 2010), with whom she studied law at the University of Sydney. Alan Bishop was a judge of the now defunct Compensation Court and the District Court of New South Wales and was instrumental in the establishment of the WorkCover Authority of New South Wales. He is honoured by the Bishops' alma mater with the Alan Bishop Scholarship for distinguished final-year undergraduate law students. Alan Bishop also served as an alderman of the City of Sydney and was involved in multiple committees and companies, including the public medical research company AGITG.

Bronwyn and Alan Bishop have two daughters; Angela, an entertainment reporter for Network Ten, and Sally. Bronwyn and Alan Bishop divorced in 1992.

== See also ==
- Women in the Australian Senate
- Women in the Australian House of Representatives

Parliament of Australia
Preceded by Anna Burke	Speaker of the Australian House of Representatives; 2013–2015	Succeeded by Tony Smith
Preceded by Jim Carlton	Member for Mackellar; 1994–2016	Succeeded by Jason Falinski
Preceded by Sir John Carrick	Senator for New South Wales; 1987–1994	Succeeded by Bob Woods
Political offices
Preceded by Peter Staples	Minister for Aged Care; 1998–2001	Succeeded by Kevin Andrews
Preceded by Gary Punch	Minister for Defence Industry, Science and Personnel; 1996–1998	Vacant Title next held by Warren Snowdon as Minister for Defence Science and Personnel
