= Jim Carlton =

Australian politician (1935–2015)

The Honourable Jim Carlton AO

Minister for Health
- In office 7 May 1982 – 11 March 1983
- Prime Minister: Malcolm Fraser
- Preceded by: Peter Baume
- Succeeded by: Neal Blewett

Member of the Australian Parliament for Mackellar
- In office 10 December 1977 – 14 January 1994
- Preceded by: Bill Wentworth
- Succeeded by: Bronwyn Bishop

Personal details
- Born: James Joseph Carlton; 13 May 1935
- Died: 24 December 2015 (aged 80)
- Party: Liberal Party of Australia
- Spouse: Diana Wilson (m. 1964)
- Children: Rob Carlton
- Education: University of Sydney
- Occupation: Business and industry consultant, politician, humanitarian

James Joseph Carlton AO (13 May 1935 – 24 December 2015) was an Australian businessman, politician, and humanitarian.

== Early life ==
Carlton was born in Sydney and earned a Bachelor of Science from the University of Sydney.

== Early career ==
Carlton’s political career began at the Sydney University Liberal Club, of which he later became president. He succeeded Sir John Carrick as General Secretary of the NSW Liberal Party during the McMahon – Snedden – Fraser periods.

== Political career ==
=== Fraser Government (1977–83) ===
Carlton was elected to the Australian House of Representatives during the 1977 election for the seat of Mackellar and was Minister for Health from May 1982 to the defeat of the Fraser Government in March 1983.

=== Opposition (1983–94) ===
Carlton served on the Defence Sub-Committee of the Joint Committee on Foreign Affairs, Defence and Trade, and held a number of Shadow Ministry positions in Opposition, including Shadow Treasurer from 1985 to 1987 and Shadow Minister for Defence from 1989 to 1990.

In 1985, he stood for the Liberal Party leadership. He lost easily to John Howard.

He resigned from Parliament in January 1994.

== Post Politics ==
From 1994 to 2001, Carlton was Secretary General of the Australian Red Cross, receiving the Red Cross Movement's highest honour, the Henry Dunant Medal. As a founder of the Crossroads Group together with John Hyde and Peter Shack he was influential in establishing the free-market or 'dry' cause in the Parliamentary wing of the Australian Liberal Party. He served on the boards of the PNG Sustainable Development Program and the Australia New Zealand School of Government. Additionally he was a Professional Fellow at the Centre for Public Policy at the University of Melbourne, and a Senior Adviser with the Boston Consulting Group, and was a council member of the Australian Strategic Policy Institute.

== Honours ==
In January 2001, Carlton was awarded the Australian Centenary Medal; and in June that year, was appointed Officer of the Order of Australia (AO) for service to Australian society.

Parliament of Australia
Preceded by Bill Wentworth	Member for Mackellar; 1977–1994	Succeeded by Bronwyn Bishop
Political offices
Preceded by Peter Baume	Minister for Health; 1982–1983	Succeeded by Neal Blewett
