= List of Australian television series =

== Future shows ==
=== Nine ===
- Château DIY Australia (lifestyle, 2026)
- Swim GP (sports, 2026)

=== ABC ===
- Dustfall (crime drama, 2026)
- Fortitude Valley (crime drama, TBA)
- The Great White (drama, TBA)
- Separated at Birth (comedy, 2026)
- Shakedown (drama, 2026)

=== Stan ===
- Careless (thriller, TBA)

=== Netflix ===
- Breakers (drama, TBA)

=== Hulu ===
- Deano (animated, TBA)

== In production ==
=== Arts and culture ===
- Message Stick (ABC 1999–)

=== Children, teens and family ===
- Beep and Mort (ABC Kids 2022–)
- Bluey (ABC Kids 2018–)
- Fizzy and Suds (ABC Kids 2024–)
- Ginger & the Vegesaurus (ABC Kids 2022–)
- Good Game: Spawn Point (ABC ME 2010–)
- Kangaroo Beach (ABC Kids 2021–)
- Knee High Spies (ABC Kids 2025-)
- Play School (ABC 1966–2013, ABC Kids 2013–)
- Reef School (ABC Kids 2023–)
- The Strange Chores (ABC ME 2019–)
- Ultimate Classroom (10 Shake/Nickelodeon 2022–)
- The Wonder Gang (ABC Kids 2021–)
- Yamba's Playtime (Imparja Television 1995–, Nine Network 2012, 9Go! 2013–, NITV 2013–)

=== Comedy ===
- Austin (ABC 2024–)
- The Back Side of Television (SBS 2021, Binge 2023–)
- The Cheap Seats (Network 10 2021–)
- Claire Hooper’s House of Games (ABC 2025–)
- Colin from Accounts (Binge 2022–)
- Fisk (ABC 2021–)
- Ghosts Australia (Network 10 2025–)
- Gogglebox Australia (The Lifestyle Channel/Network 10 2015–)
- Gruen (ABC 2008–)
- Guy Montgomery's Guy Mont-Spelling Bee (ABC 2024–)
- Have You Been Paying Attention? (Network 10 2013–)
- The Last Year of Television (SBS 2020–2022, Binge 2023–)
- Mother and Son (ABC 1984–1994, 2023–)
- Shaun Micallef's Eve of Destruction (ABC 2024–)
- Utopia (ABC 2014–2019, 2023–)
- The Weekly with Charlie Pickering (ABC 2015–)
- Sam Pang Tonight (Network 10 2025–)

=== Documentaries ===
- Australian Story (ABC 1996–)
- Compass (ABC 1998–)

=== Drama ===
- High Country (Binge 2024–)
- The Killings at Parrish Station (Stan 2026)
- My Brilliant Career (Netflix 2026)
- My Life is Murder (Network 10 2019, Acorn TV 2021–)
- NCIS: Sydney (Paramount+ 2023–)
- RFDS (Seven Network 2021–)
- Treasure & Dirt (ABC 2026)

=== Factual ===
- Ambulance Australia (Network 10 2018–)
- Airport 24/7 (Network 10 2025)
- Aussie Gold Hunters (Foxtel Discovery 2016–)
- Aussie Lobster Men (7mate 2019–)
- Aussie Salvage Squad (7mate 2018–)
- The Australian Wars (SBS 2022–)
- Back Roads (ABC 2015–)
- Big Miracles (Nine Network 2023–)
- Bondi Rescue (Network 10 2006–2021, 2023–)
- Border Security: Australia's Front Line (Seven Network 2004–)
- Catalyst (ABC 2001–)
- Coast Australia (Foxtel History 2013–)
- Dance Life (Amazon Prime 2024)
- Deadly Down Under (7mate 2018–)
- Desert Collectors (Foxtel A&E 2018–)
- Desert Vet (Nine Network 2019–)
- The Dog House Australia (Network 10 2021–)
- Dogs Behaving (Very) Badly (Network 10 2023–)
- Every Family Has A Secret (SBS 2019–)
- Fearless: The Inside Story Of The AFLW (Disney+ 2022–)
- For the Love of Pets (Nine Network 2023–)
- The Force: Behind the Line (Seven Network 2006–)
- Highway Patrol (Seven Network 2009–2014, 2019–)
- The Matchmakers (SBS 2024–)
- MegaTruckers (7mate 2012–)
- Missing Persons Investigations (Nine Network 2022–)
- Outback Opal Hunters (Foxtel Discovery 2018–)
- Outback Ringer (ABC 2020–)
- Outback Truckers (Seven Network 2012, 7mate 2016–)
- Outback Wrangler (9Go!, Nine Network 2016–)
- Paramedics (Nine Network 2018–)
- The Pet Rescuers (Nine Network 2021–)
- RBT (Nine Network 2010–)
- Road to Riches (A&E 2019–)
- Stuff the British Stole (ABC 2022–)
- Taronga: Who's Who in the Zoo (Nine Network 2020–)
- Territory Cops (Crime & Investigation Network 2012, Network 10 2016, 2021)
- Todd Sampson's Body Hack (Network 10 2016–)
- Towies (7mate 2016–)
- War On Waste (ABC 2017–2018, 2023–)
- Who Do You Think You Are? (SBS 2008–)

=== Game shows ===
- The 1% Club (Seven Network 2023–)
- The Chase Australia (Seven Network 2015–)
- Deal or No Deal (Seven Network 2003–2013, Network 10 2024–)
- The Floor (Nine Network 2025–)
- Hard Quiz (ABC 2016–)
- Have You Been Paying Attention? (Network 10 2013–)
- The Hundred with Andy Lee (Nine Network 2021–)
- Jeopardy! Australia (Nine Network 2024–)
- Mastermind (ABC 1978–1984, SBS 2019–)
- Taskmaster Australia (Network 10 2023–)
- Tipping Point Australia (Nine Network 2024–)

=== Lifestyle ===
- 10 Minute Kitchen (Network 10 2021—)
- Alive and Cooking (WIN Television 2008–)
- Ben's Menu (Network 10 2014–)
- Better Homes and Gardens (Seven Network 1995–, 7two 2014–)
- Billion Dollar Playground (Binge, 2025–)
- Cheese Slices (ABC 2008–)
- Compass (ABC 1998–)
- Cook Like An Italian (SBS Food 2020–)
- The Cook Up with Adam Liaw (SBS Food 2021–)
- Creek to Coast (Seven Network Queensland 2002–)
- Delish (Nine Network/9Life 2010–)
- Designing A Legacy (ABC 2021–)
- Destination WA (Nine Network)
- Dream Build (ABC 2012–)
- Dream Gardens (ABC 2017–)
- Escape from the City (ABC 2019–)
- Escape with ET (Nine Network 1997–2004, Network 10 2005–)
- Everyday Gourmet with Justine Schofield (Network 10 2011–)
- Fishing Australia (WIN Television 2001–)
- Freshly Picked with Simon Toohey (Network 10 2020—)
- Further Back in Time for Dinner (ABC 2020)
- The Garden Hustle (Nine Network 2023–)
- Gardening Australia (ABC 1990–)
- Getaway (Nine Network 1992–)
- Good Chef Bad Chef (Seven Network 2006–2007, Network 10 2011–)
- Good Game: Spawn Point (ABC Me 2010–)
- Grand Designs Australia (Lifestyle Channel 2010–)
- Helloworld (Nine Network 2018–2019, Seven Network 2019–)
- The Home Team (Network Ten 2014–)
- Hook, Line and Sinker (Seven Tasmania 2001–, 7mate 2013–)
- House Hunters Australia (Network 10, 2025-)
- The House of Wellness (Seven Network, 2017–present)
- Hungry (Network 10 2022-)
- Kitchen Cabinet (ABC 2012–2016, 2023–)
- Lee Rayner's Fishing Edge (Network 10 2017—)
- The Living Room (Network 10 2012–)
- Love It or List It (Lifestyle Channel 2017–)
- Luca's Key Ingredient (Network 10 2021–)
- Luxe Listings Sydney (Amazon Prime 2021–)
- Luxury Escapes (Network 10 2018–)
- Mass for You at Home (Network 10 1971–2013, Network 10/10 Comedy 2013–)
- Melbourne Weekender (Seven Network 2015–)
- Plat du Tour (SBS 2020–)
- Ready Set Reno (9Life 2017–)
- River to Reef (Foxtel/Southern Cross/C31/10 Drama 2005–)
- Selling Houses Australia (Lifestyle Channel 2008–)
- Small Business Secrets (SBS 2016-)
- South Aussie with Cosi (Nine Network 2012–)
- Space Invaders (Nine Network 2021–)
- Undressed (Network 10 2022)
- Vasili's Garden (SBS 2007, Channel 31 2002–2007, 2008–2013, 7two 2016–)
- Weekender (Seven Network Queensland 2020–)
- Your Domain (Nine Network 2019–)

=== Music ===
- Rage (ABC 1987–)

=== News and current affairs ===
- 10 News (Network 10 2018–)
- 10 Late News (1991–2011, 2012–2014, 2024–present)
- 10 News+ (Network 10 2025–)
- 60 Minutes (Nine Network 1979–)
- 7.30 (ABC 2011–)
- ABC News (ABC 1956–)
- ABC News At Five (ABC/ABC News 2018)
- ABC News Breakfast (ABC TV Plus 2008–2011, ABC News/ABC TV Plus 2010–2011, ABC/ABC News 2011–)
- ABC News: Early Edition (ABC 2013–)
- ABC News Mornings (ABC News 2010–)
- ABC News with Ros Childs (ABC 2005–) (previously Midday Report) and World at Noon
- ABC Open (ABC News 2012–)
- Afternoon Live (ABC News 2010–)
- Agenda (News24 Australia)
- Australia Network News (ABC 2001–)
- Australia Wide (ABC News 2015–)
- Australian Agenda (News24 Australia)
- Australian Story (ABC 1995–)
- Behind the News (ABC 1969–2003, 2005–)
- The Bolt Report (Network 10 2011–2015, News24 Australia 2016–)
- BTN Newsbreak (ABC 2009–)
- The Business (ABC 2012–)
- Catalyst (ABC 2001–)
- Credlin (News24 2017–)
- A Current Affair (Nine Network 1971–1978, 1988–)
- Dateline (SBS 1984–)
- The Feed (SBS 2 2013–)
- First Edition (News24 Australia)
- Foreign Correspondent (ABC 1996–)
- Four Corners (ABC 1961–)
- The Friday Show (News24 2015–)
- Future Forum (ABC 2012–)
- Inside Story (Nine Network 2014–)
- Insiders (ABC 2001–)
- Insight (SBS 1995–)
- Jones + Co (News24 2016–)
- Landline (ABC 1992–)
- Living Black (SBS 2003–)
- Media Watch (ABC 1989–2000, 2002–)
- NBN News (Nine Northern NSW 1972–)
- News On 3 (ABC3 2009–2016)
- Nine News (Nine Network 2008–)
- Nine's Afternoon News (Nine Network 2004–)
- Nine's Early Morning News (Nine Network 2008–)
- Nine's Morning News (Nine Network 1981–)
- NITV News (NITV 2007–)
- Order in The House (ABC)
- Outsiders (News24 Australia 2016–)
- Paul Murray Live (News24 Australia 2010–)
- Planet America (ABC News 2012–)
- Q&A (ABC/ABC News 2008–)
- Question Time (News24)
- SBS World News Australia (SBS 2002–)
- Seven Afternoon News at 4 (Seven Network 2013–)
- Seven Early News (Seven Network 2008–)
- Seven Morning News (Seven Network 2000–)
- Seven News (Seven Network 2000–)
- Seven News with Mark Ferguson (Seven Sydney 2014–)
- News24 (News24 1996–)
- Speers (News24 2018–)
- Sunrise (Seven Network 1991–1998, 2002–)
- Today (Nine Network 1982–)
- Weekend Breakfast (ABC News 2012–)
- Weekend Sunrise (Seven Network 2005–)
- Weekend Today (Nine Network 2009–)
- WIN News (WIN Television 1960–)
- The World (ABC News 2010–)
- The World This Week (ABC News 2010–)
- World Watch (SBS 1993–, SBS WorldWatch 2022–)

=== Reality ===
- Alone Australia (reality SBS 2023–)
- The Amazing Race Australia (Seven Network 2011–2014, Network 10 2019—)
- Australia's Got Talent (Seven Network 2007–2012, Nine Network 2013, 2016, Seven Network 2019–)
- Australian Idol (Network Ten 2003–2009, Seven Network 2023–)
- Australian Survivor (Nine Network 2002, Seven Network 2006, Network 10 2016–)
- The Bachelor Australia (Network 10 2013–)
- The Block (Nine Network 2003–)
- The Bridge Australia (Paramount+ 2022–)
- Byron Baes (Netflix 2022)
- The Challenge: Australia (Network 10 2022–)
- Dessert Masters (Network 10 2023–)
- Dishing It Up (SBS 2022–)
- Dream Home (Seven Network 2024)
- Family Rules (NITV 2017–)
- The Farmer Wants a Wife (Nine Network 2007–2012, 2016, Seven Network 2020–)
- Filthy Rich and Homeless (SBS 2017–)
- The Golden Bachelor (Nine Network 2025–)
- Gordon Ramsay’s Food Stars Australia (Nine Network 2024–)
- Hunted (Network 10 2022–)
- I'm a Celebrity...Get Me Out of Here! (Network 10 2015–)
- Lego Masters (Nine Network 2019–)
- Made In Bondi (Seven Network 2024)
- Married at First Sight (Nine Network 2015–)
- MasterChef Australia (Network 10 2009–)
- The Matchmakers (SBS 2023–)
- Mates on a Mission (Seven Network 2022)
- Maxim TV (Network 10/10 Bold 2014, 7mate 2018–)
- Mirror, Mirror (Network 10 2021–2023)
- My Mum, Your Dad (Nine Network 2022–2023)
- My Reno Rules (Seven Network 2026–)
- Parental Guidance (Nine Network 2021–)
- The Piano (ABC 2025)
- The Real Love Boat (Network 10 2022)
- SAS Australia (Seven Network 2020–)
- Snackmasters (reality Nine Network 2021–2022)
- Stranded on Honeymoon Island (Seven Network 2025–)
- The Summit (Nine Network 2023–2024)
- The Traitors (Network 10 2022–2023)
- Travel Guides (Nine Network 2017–)
- The Voice (Nine Network 2012–2020, Seven Network 2021–)
- Wife Swap (Lifestyle 2012–2013, Seven Network 2021)

=== Special events ===
- AACTA Awards (Network 10 2012–)
- Antenna Awards (Channel 31 2004–)
- APRA Awards (Foxtel)
- ARIA Awards (Network 10 1992–2000, 2002–2008, 2010, 2014–2016, Nine Network 2001, 2009, 2017– 9Go! 2011–2013)
- Australia Day Live Concert (ABC 2004–2011, Network 10 2012–2018, ABC 2019–)
- Carols by Candlelight (Nine Network 1952–)
- Carols in the City (Nine Network 1970s–2008, Network 10 2009–)
- Carols in the Domain (Seven Sydney/Disney Channel 1982–)
- Channel Seven Perth Telethon (Seven Perth)
- Creative Generation (Network 10 2005–2023, Nine Network 2024–) Celebrating 20 years
- Eurovision Song Contest (SBS 1983–present)
- Gold Week Telethon (Nine Sydney)
- Good Friday Appeal (Seven Melbourne 1957–)
- National Dreamtime Awards (NITV 2017–)
- Schools Spectacular (ABC 1985–2012, Nine Network 2013–2015, Seven Network 2016–2019, 2022–)
- Sydney Gay and Lesbian Mardi Gras (ABC 1994–1996, 2022–, Network 10 1997–1999, SBS 2014–2021)
- Sydney New Year's Eve Fireworks (Nine Network 1995–2006, 2009–2013, Network 10 2006–2009, ABC 2013–)
- TV Week Logie Awards (ABC 1961–1965, Seven Network 1989–1995, 2023–, Nine Network 1959–2022, Network 10 1981–1993)

=== Soap operas ===
- Home and Away (Seven Network 1988–)

=== Sport ===
Does not include sport broadcasts themselves

- 10 Sport (Network 10)
- 100% Footy (Nine Network 2018–)
- A-Leagues All Access (Network 10 2022–)
- ABC Sport (ABC)
- AFL 360 (Fox Sports 2011–)
- AFL Game Day (Seven Network 2008–)
- Armchair Experts (Seven Network 2021–)
- The Back Page (Fox Sports 1997–)
- The Barefoot Rugby League Show (NITV)
- Barefoot Sports (NITV)
- Bill & Boz (Fox Sports 2017–)
- Commonwealth Games (Seven Network/7two/7mate 2002, 2018, 2022–present)
- The Cricket Show (Cricket) (Nine Network 1997–2018)
- Cycling Central (Cycling) (SBS 2003–2007, 2010–)
- The Fan (Fox League 2017–)
- The FIFA World Cup Show (Football) (SBS)
- Fight Call Out (Foxtel)
- Fight Week: Training Grounds (Foxtel 2016)
- Footy Classified (AFL) (Nine Network 2007–) (except NSW and QLD)
- The Footy Fix (Seven Network)
- Footy QLD (NRL) (Nine Network)
- Footy SA (AFL) (Nine Network)
- Footy WA (AFL) (Nine Network)
- The Front Bar (Seven Network 2016–)
- GolfBarons (9Now/Fox Sports 2020–)
- The Golf Show (Fox Sports)
- Grandstand (ABC News 2012–)
- How Good Is Golf (Fox Sports)
- Inside Cricket (Fox Sports)
- Inside Rugby (Fox Sports)
- Inside Supercars (Fox Sports 2015–)
- The Late Show with Matty Johns (Fox League 2017–)
- The Lawn Bowls Show (Channel 31 2006–)
- The Marngrook Footy Show
- MotorRacing 360 (Fox Sports 2026–)
- The Night Watchmen (Fox Cricket 2018–)
- Nine's Wide World of Sports (Nine Network 1981–)
- NITV Sport (NITV)
- NRL 360 (Fox Sports 2013–)
- NRL on FOX (Fox Sports 2009–)
- Offsiders (ABC 2006–)
- Olympics on Seven (Seven Network/7two/7mate 1992–2008, 2016–present)
- Over The Black Dot
- Paralympic Games (Seven Network 2016–2022, Nine Network 2024–present)
- Pardon the Interruption Australia (ESPN Australia 2004–)
- The Professor's Farewell Tour (Fox League 2017–)
- Round Ball Rules (Network 10 2022–)
- Rugby 360 (Fox Sports 2016–)
- SBS Speedweek (Motorsport) (SBS)
- SBS Sport (SBS)
- Seven Sport (Seven Network 1999)
- Shannons Legends of Motorsport (7mate 2014–)
- Sports Lounge (Australia Plus TV)
- Sports Sunday (Nine Network 2017–)
- The Sunday Footy Show (AFL) (Nine Network 1993–)
- The Sunday Footy Show (NRL) (Nine Network 1993–)
- Sunday Footy Fest (Seven Network 2021–)
- Sunday Night with Matty Johns (Fox League 2017–)
- The Sunday Roast (NRL) (Nine Network 2005–)
- Supercars Life (Fox Sports 2015–)
- TAC Cup Future Stars (Nine Network 2009–)
- Talking Footy (Seven Network 2013–)
- That Pacific Sport Show (ABC 2020)
- Total Football (Fox Sports)
- UFC Fight Week (Foxtel)
- Wide World of Sports (Nine Network 1981–1999, 2008–)
- Women's Footy (Nine Network 2017–)
- The World Game (Football) (SBS 2001–)

=== Talk and variety ===
- 20 to 1 (Nine Network 2005–2011, 2016–2019)
- The ABC Of (ABC 2022–)
- The Bolt Report (Network 10 2011–2015, News24 Australia 2016–)
- Frankly (ABC 2022–)
- The Morning Show (Network 10 with Bert Newton 1992, Seven Network 2007–)
- National Press Club Address (ABC)
- One Plus One (ABC 2010–)
- Take 5 with Zan Rowe (ABC 2022–)
- Today Extra (Nine Network 2016–)

== Production ended ==
=== Arts and culture ===
- Art Nation (ABC 2010–2011)
- The Arts Show (ABC 1999–2001)
- Artscape (ABC 2011)
- Art Works (ABC 2021–2023)
- At the Movies (ABC 2004–2014)
- The Bazura Project (Channel 31 2006–2008) (ABC TV Plus 2011)
- Big Ideas (ABC 2010–2014)
- The Book Club, formerly First Tuesday Book Club (ABC 2006–2017)
- Critical Mass (ABC 2014)
- E! News (Network 10 1998–2001)
- The Exhibitionists (ABC 2022)
- Fashionista (SBS 2003–2005)
- Hannah Gadsby's Oz (ABC 2014)
- The Mix (ABC 2014–2021)
- Movie Guide (HSV-7 1958–1959)
- Movie Juice (Network 10 2014–2015, Nine Network 2017–2018)
- The Movie Show (SBS 1986–2006, 2007–2008)
- Myf Warhurst's Nice (ABC 2012)
- Next Stop Hollywood (ABC 2013)
- Sunday Arts (ABC 2006–2009)
- Tiny Oz (ABC 2022)

=== Children, teens and family ===
- 100% Wolf (ABC ME 2021)
- 100% Wolf (ABC ME 2023)
- Active Kidz (ABC 2004)
- Adventure Island (ABC 1967–1972)
- The Adventures of Blinky Bill (ABC 1993)
- The Adventures of Bottle Top Bill and His Best Friend Corky (ABC 2009)
- The Adventures of the Bush Patrol (Seven Network 1996–1998)
- The Adventures of Long John Silver (ABC 1958)
- The Adventures of Sam (ABC 1997)
- Adventures of the Seaspray (ABC 1967)
- The Adventures of Sebastian the Fox (ABC 1963)
- The Adventures of Skippy (Nine Network 1992)
- The Adventures of the Terrible Ten (Nine Network 1959–1960)
- Adventures on Kythera (Nine Network 1991–1992)
- The Afternoon Show (ABC)
- Agro's Cartoon Connection (Seven Network BTQ/ATN 1989–1997)
- Alexander Bunyip's Billabong (ABC 1978–1988)
- Alien TV (9Go! 2019–2021)
- All for Kids (Seven Network 2008–2009)
- Alpha Scorpio (ABC 1974)
- A*mazing (Seven Network 1994–1998)
- Andra (ABC 1976)
- Animal Park (Seven Network 1991)
- Arthur! and the Square Knights of the Round Table (cartoon series) (ABC 1966–1968)
- As the Bell Rings (Disney Channel 2007–2011)
- Baby Animals in Our World (Eleven 2016–2017)
- Backyard Science (ABC/Seven Network 2004–2008)
- The Ballad of Riverboat Bill (ABC 1965)
- Bambaloo (Seven Network 2003–2007)
- Bananas in Pyjamas (ABC 1992–2002)
- Bananas in Pyjamas (animated) (ABC4Kids 2011–2012)
- Bang Goes the Budgie (ABC 1985)
- Barrumbi Kids (NITV 2023)
- Bay City (Seven Network 1993)
- Beat Bugs (7two 2016–2018)
- Berry Bees (9Go! 2019–2020)
- The Big Arvo (Seven Network 2001–2004)
- The Big Breakfast (Network Ten 1992–1995)
- The Big Cheez (Network 10 1998–2005)
- Big Square Eye (ABC 1991–1992)
- Bindi the Jungle Girl (ABC 2007–2008)
- Bindi's Bootcamp (ABC 2012–2015)
- Blue Water High (ABC 2005–2008)
- Blue Zoo (ABC ME 2014)
- Boffins (ABC 1994)
- The Book Place (Seven Network 1991–2003)
- Bootleg (ABC 2002)
- Born to Spy (ABC ME 2021)
- Bottersnikes and Gumbles (7TWO 2015–2016)
- BrainBuzz (9Go! 2018–2020)
- Bright Sparks (1989)
- Bubble Bath Bay (ABC TV Plus 2015–2016)
- Built to Survive (ABC 2022)
- Bunyip (ABC 1987)
- The Bureau of Magical Things (10 Peach 2018, 10 Shake 2020)
- The Bush Gang (ABC 1981)
- Bushwhacked! (ABC ME 2012–2017)
- Butterbean's Café (9Go! 2015–2017)
- Butterfly Island (ABC 1985, Seven Network 1985–1987)
- C/o The Bartons (ABC 1988)
- Calvin and Kaison's Play Power (Nick Jr/10 Shake 2020)
- Captain Flinn and the Pirate Dinosaurs (9Go! 2015)
- Captain Fortune Show (Seven Network 1957)
- The Cartoon Company (Nine Network 1986–1991)
- Castaway (Seven Network 2011)
- Catch Kandy (Seven Network 1973)
- Challenger (Nine Network 1997–1998)
- Channel Niners (Nine Network 1983–1985)
- Cheez TV (Network 10 1995–2005)
- Chuck Finn (Seven Network 1999–2000)
- The City Lights What You Gonna Do (Seven Network 2004)
- CJ the DJ (ABC ME 2009–2010)
- Clowning Around (Seven Network 1992–1993)
- C'mon Kids (Nine Network 1986–1990)
- Colour in the Creek (Nine Network 1985)
- Come Midnight Monday (ABC 1982)
- Cooking for Kids with Luis (Nick Jr. 2004–2005)
- The Coral Island (ABC 2000)
- Couch Potato (ABC 1991–2005)
- Count Us In (ABC 1999–2000)
- Crash Zone (Seven Network 1999–2001)
- Crazy Fun Park (ABC ME 2023–)
- Creature Features (ABC 2002–2008)
- The Crew, formerly known as School Torque (SBS 2013–2014)
- Crocamole (10 Peach 2016–2017)
- Crunch Time (9Go! 2016–2018)
- The Curiosity Show (Nine Network 1972–1990)
- Cushion Kids (Nine Network 2001)
- Cybergirl (Network 10/ABC 2001–2002)
- Dance Academy (ABC ME 2010–2013)
- The Daryl and Ossie Cartoon Show (Nine Network 1976–1978)
- The Day My Butt Went Psycho! (9Go! 2013–2015)
- Dead Gorgeous (ABC 2010)
- Deadly (Nine Network 2006–2009)
- The Deep (7two/ABC 2015–2019)
- Desmond and the Channel 9-Pins (TCN-9 1957–1962)
- Dex Hamilton: Alien Entomologist (Network 10 2008–2009)
- Didi and B. (Nickelodeon 2012–2013)
- dirtgirlworld (ABC 2009)
- The Disposables (ABC ME 2023)
- Dive Club (Network 10 2021)
- Dogstar (Nine Network 2008)
- Don't Blame The Koalas (Nine Network 2002–2003)
- Dorothy the Dinosaur (ABC Kids 2007–2010)
- Double Trouble (Nine Network 2008)
- Download (Nine Network 2000–2002)
- Driven Crazy
- Drop Dead Weird (7two 2017–2019)
- A Drop In The Ocean (ABC 1972)
- Dumbotz (9Go! 2019)
- The Early Bird Show (Network 10 1984–1989)
- Earthwatch (ABC 1980)
- The Eggs (Nine Network 2004)
- The Elephant Princess (Network 10 2008–2011)
- Elly & Jools (Nine Network 1990)
- Erky Perky (Seven Network 2006–2009)
- Escape from Jupiter (1994) and Return to Jupiter (1997)
- Escape of the Artful Dodger (Nine Network 2001)
- Eugénie Sandler P.I. (ABC 2000)
- The Experimentals (ABC 2014)
- The Fairies (ABC 2000 (Vintage VHS series), Seven Network 2005–2012 (TV series))
- Falcon Island (Nine Network 1981)
- Fame and Misfortune (ABC 1986)
- Fanshaw & Crudnut (9Go! 2017)
- Fast Tracks (Network 10 1998–1999)
- Fat Cat and Friends (Network 10 1972–1987, Seven Network 1987–1992)
- Fatty and George (ABC 1981)
- Feral TV (ABC 1995)
- The Ferals (ABC 1994–1995)
- Fergus McPhail (Network 10 2004)
- Ferry Boat Fred (ABC 1992)
- Finders Keepers (ABC 1991–1992) (also known as The Finder)
- First Day (ABC ME 2020–2022)
- Five Minutes More (ABC 2006)
- Five Times Dizzy (Nine Network 1986)
- The Flamin' Thongs (ABC ME 2014)
- Flipper & Lopaka (Seven Network 1999–2005)
- Flushed (7two 2015–2016)
- The Flying Dogtor (1962–1964)
- For Real (10 Shake 2020)
- Foreign Exchange (Nine Network 2004)
- Frank and Francesca (ABC 1973)
- Fredd Bear's Breakfast-A-Go-Go (Network 10 1969–1971)
- Fun Farm (TCN-9 1956–1957)
- G2G (Nine Network 2008)
- The Gamers 2037 (9Go! 2020)
- Gamify (10 Peach 2019)
- Gardening for Kids with Madi (Nick Jr. 2006–2008)
- The Genie From Down Under (ABC 1996–1998)
- Get Ace (Eleven 2014)
- Get Arty (7two 2017–2020)
- Get Clever (7two 2018–2020)
- Get It Together (ABC ME 2019–2020)
- The Gift (Nine Network 1997)
- Giggle and Hoot (ABC Kids 2009–2020)
- The Girl from Tomorrow (Nine Network 1991–1992)
- Girl TV (Seven Network 2003–2004)
- Glad Rags (Nine Network 1995)
- Golden Pennies (ABC 1985)
- Good Game (ABC 2006–2016)
- Good Morning!!! (Network Ten 1967–1971)
- Goodsports (WIN, Nine Network 1991–2000)
- Grace Beside Me (NITV/ABC ME 2018)
- Guinevere Jones (Network 10 2002)
- A gURLs wURLd (Nine Network 2011)
- Gymnastics Academy: A Second Chance (Netflix 2022)
- H_{2}O: Just Add Water (Network 10/Disney Channel 2006–2010)
- Hairy Legs (7two 2014)
- Halfway Across the Galaxy and Turn Left (Seven Network 1991–1992)
- Hanging With (Disney 2013–2019)
- Happy Go 'Round (Nine Network 1970s)
- Hardball (ABC ME 2019–2021)
- Haydaze (Network 10 1990)
- The Henderson Kids (Network 10 1985–1987)
- Here's Humphrey (Nine Network 1965–2009)
- Hi-5 (Nine Network 1999–2012, 9Go! 2017–2018)
- Hi-5 House (Nick Jr. 2013–2018, 10 Peach 2014–2015)
- Hiccup and Sneeze (9Go! 2017–2018)
- High Flyers (Network 10 1999)
- Hills End (ABC 1989)
- Holly's Heroes (Nine Network 2005)
- Home (ABC 1983)
- The Hooley Dooleys (ABC 1996–2009)
- Hoot Hoot Go! (ABC TV Plus 2016)
- Horace and Tina (Network 10 2001)
- Hot Source (Nine Network 2003–2006)
- Hunter (ABC 1984–1985)
- I Am Me (9Go! 2020)
- I Got a Rocket (Network 10 2006–2007)
- Imagination Train (9Go! 2015–2017)
- In the Box (Network Ten 1998–2006)
- In Your Dreams (7two 2013–2014)
- The InBESTigators (ABC ME 2019–2020)
- Infinity Limited (ABC 1980)
- The Interpretaris (ABC 1966)
- Itch (ABC ME 2020–2021)
- It's Academic (Network 10 1968–1969, Seven Network 1970–1978, 2005–2012, 7two 2013–2016)
- Jar Dwellers SOS (10 Peach 2013–2014)
- Jarjums (NITV 2013–2015)
- Jass Time (KidsCo 2009)
- Jay's Jungle (7two 2015–2018)
- Johnson and Friends (ABC 1990–1995)
- The Judy Jack Show (HSV-7 1956–1957)
- Just 4 Fun (Southern Cross 1976–1978)
- K-9 (Network 10 2009–2010)
- Kaboodle (ABC 1987–1990)
- Kangaroo Creek Gang (Nine Network 2002)
- Kelly (Network 10 1991)
- Kelvin Wood & Autone featuring Amanda Wilson Crush (Network 10 2022)
- Kid Detectives (Seven Network 2009)
- Kids Only (Nine Network 1986–1988)
- Kids' WB (Nine Network 2006–2009, Nine Network/9Go! 2009–2012, 9Go! 2013–2019)
- The Kingdom of Paramithi (Nine Network/Nick Jr. 2008)
- Kitchen Whiz (Nine Network 2011–2012, 9Go! 2013–2015)
- Kitty is Not a Cat (7two 2018–2019)
- KTV (TasTV)
- Kuu Kuu Harajuku (10 Peach 2015–2019)
- Lab Rats Challenge (Nine Network 2008, Seven Network 2012, ABC ME 2013–2014)
- Lah-Lah's Adventures (7two 2014)
- Lah-Lah's Big Live Band (7two 2009)
- Lah-Lah's Stripy Sock Club (ABC Kids 2019)
- Larry the Lawnmower (Seven Network 2008–2010)
- Larry the Wonderpup (7two 2018)
- Legacy of the Silver Shadow (Network 10 2002)
- Lexi & Lottie: Trusty Twin Detectives (10 Peach 2016–2017)
- Lift Off (ABC 1992–1995)
- Lightning Point (Network 10 2012)
- Lights, Camera, Action, Wiggles! (ABC 2002–2003)
- Li'l Elvis and the Truckstoppers (ABC 1997–1998)
- Li'l Horrors (Seven Network 2001)
- The Listies Work For Peanuts (ABC ME 2019)
- Little J & Big Cuz (NITV 2017)
- Little Lunch (ABC ME 2015)
- Lizzie's Library (ABC 1995)
- Lockie Leonard (Nine Network 2007–2011)
- The Lost Islands (Network Ten 1976)
- The Magic Boomerang (ABC 1965–1966)
- Magic Circle Club (ABC 1966)
- Magic Mountain (ABC 1997–1998)
- Mako: Island of Secrets (Network 10 2013, 10 Peach 2013–2016)
- Mal.com (ABC 2011)
- Master Raindrop (Seven Network 2009)
- Match It (Seven Network 2012, 7two 2013–2014)
- Match Mates (Nine Network 1981–1982)
- MaveriX (ABC ME 2022)
- Me and My Monsters (Network Ten/Nickelodeon/BBC 2010–2011)
- Mikki vs The World (ABC ME 2021–2022)
- Mind Over Maddie (Disney Channel 2013)
- Minty (ABC 1998)
- The Miraculous Mellops (Network 10 1991–1992)
- Mirror, Mirror (Network 10 1995) (Australian/New Zealand co-production)
- Mirror, Mirror II (Nine Network 1997–1998) (Australian/New Zealand co-production)
- Misery Guts (Nine Network 1998)
- Mission Top Secret (Seven Network 1991 telemovie, Network 10 1994–1995)
- Mixy (ABC 1998–2002)
- Mortified (Nine Network 2006–2007)
- Move It (9Go! 2014–2018)
- Mr. Squiggle (ABC 1959–1999)
- Mulligrubs (Network 10 1988–1996)
- The Music Shop (Network Ten 1996–1998)
- Mustangs FC (ABC ME 2017–2020)
- My Generation (Nine Network 1995–1996)
- My Great Big Adventure (ABC ME 2012)
- My Place (ABC ME 2009–2011)
- The Mystery of Black Rose Castle (ABC 2001)
- The Nargun and the Stars (ABC 1981)
- Nate is Late (9Go! 2018)
- The New Adventures of Blinky Bill (ABC 1984–1987)
- The New Adventures of Ocean Girl (Network Ten 2000)
- The New Legends of Monkey (ABC ME 2018–2020)
- New MacDonald's Farm (Nine Network/ABC 2004–2007)
- News of the Wild (7two 2018–2019)
- News to Me (ABC ME 2016–2017)
- Noah and Saskia (ABC 2004)
- Now You See It (Seven Network 1985–1993, Nine Network 1998–2000)
- Nowhere Boys (ABC ME 2013–2018)
- Numbers Count (ABC)
- Ocean Girl (Network 10 1994–1998)
- Ocean Star (Network 10 2003)
- Ocean Star: the Quest (Network 10 2002)
- Oh Yuck! (7two 2017–2019)
- Old Tom (ABC 2001)
- Once Upon a Dream (Network 10 2012)
- Our Animals (ABC)
- Out There (ABC 2003–2004)
- Outback 8 (Network 10 2008)
- Outriders (Nine Network 2001)
- Parallax (ABC/Nine Network 2004)
- Pearlie (Network 10 2009)
- Penelope K, by the way (Cbeebies 2010–2012)
- Petals (ABC 1998–1999)
- Peters Club (GTV-9)
- Phoenix Five (ABC 1969–1970)
- Pig's Breakfast (Nine Network 1999)
- Pipsqueaks (7two 2013)
- Pirate Express (9Go! 2015)
- Pirate Islands (Network 10 2003, 2007)
- Pixel Pinkie (Nine Network 2009)
- Planet Lulin (ABC TV Plus 2023)
- Play Along with Sam (Nick Jr. 2013–2020)
- Playhouse Disney (Seven Network 2003–2007)
- The PM's Daughter (ABC ME 2022–)
- Prank Patrol (ABC 2009–2013)
- Prisoner Zone (ABC3 2016)
- Professor Poopsnagle's Steam Zeppelin (Nine Network 1986)
- Pugwall (Nine Network 1989–1991)
- Puzzle Play (Network 10 2006–2011)
- Pyramid (Nine Network 2009–2012, 9Go! 2013–2014)
- Raggs (Seven Network 2006–2009, 7two 2008–2012)
- Random and Whacky (10 Peach 2017–2020)
- Ready For This (ABC ME 2015)
- Ready Set Dance (Nick Jr 2019)
- Ready, Steady, Wiggle! (ABC Kids/Disney Junior 2013–2015, 2021)
- Return to Jupiter (ABC 1997)
- Rock Island Mysteries (10 Shake/Nickelodeon 2022–2024)
- Ridgey Didge (Network 10 1987–1989)
- RollerCoaster (ABC 2005–2010)
- Romper Room (Seven Network 1963–1988)
- Round the Twist (Seven Network 1989, ABC 1992–2001)
- The Rovers (Network 10 1969–1970)
- The Saddle Club (ABC 2001–2004, Nine Network 2009–2010)
- Sam Fox: Extreme Adventures (10 Peach 2014)
- Sarvo (Nickelodeon 2003–2007)
- Saturday Disney (Seven Network 1990–2012, Seven Network/7two 2012–2016, Seven Network/7flix 2016)
- Saturdee (1986)
- Scooter: Secret Agent (Network 10 2005)
- Scope (Network 10 2005–2013, 10 Peach 2013–2020, 10 Shake 2020–2021)
- Search for Treasure Island (Seven Network 1998, 2000)
- Secret Valley (ABC 1980, 1984)
- Seven Little Australians (ABC 1973)
- The Shak (Nine Network 2006–2009)
- The Shak at Home (Nine Network 2009–2010)
- Shake Tales (10 Shake 2020–2023)
- The Shapies (Nine Network 2002)
- Sharky's Friends (Nine Network 2007–2008)
- Sherazade: The Untold Stories (10 Peach 2017–2018)
- SheZow (Network 10 2012–2013)
- Ship to Shore (Nine Network 1993–1996)
- Shirl's Neighbourhood (Seven Network 1979–1983)
- Short Cuts (Seven Network 2001)
- The Silver Brumby (Network 10 1996–1998)
- Silversun (ABC/Seven Network 2004)
- Simon Townsend's Wonder World (Network 10 1979–1986)
- The Skinner Boys: Guardians of the Lost Secrets (9Go! 2014–2017)
- Skippy: Adventures in Bushtown (Nine Network 1998–1999)
- Skippy the Bush Kangaroo (Nine Network 1966–1968)
- Sky Trackers (Seven Network 1994)
- The Sleepover Club (Nine Network 2003–2008)
- Smashhdown! (9Go! 2018–2021)
- Smugglers Beware (ABC 1963)
- Snake Tales (Nine Network 2009)
- Snobs (Nine Network 2003)
- Soundtrack to Our Teenage Zombie Apocalypse (ABC ME 2022)
- Space Chickens in Space (9Go! 2018–2019)
- Space Nova (9Go!/ABC ME 2021–2023)
- Spellbinder (Australian/Polish co-production) (Nine Network 1995)
- Spellbinder: Land of the Dragon Lord (Australian/Polish/Chinese co-production) (Nine Network 1997)
- Spit It Out (Seven Network 2010–2011)
- Spongo, Fuzz & Jalapena (ABC ME 2019)
- Spooky Files (ABC ME 2023–2024)
- Staines Down Drains (2006–2011)
- Stereo Soundclash featuring Louise Carver Stand Back (Seven Network 2004)
- Star Space with Adam Saunders (ABC 2008)
- Stay Tuned (ABC ME 2011–2012)
- Steam Punks! (ABC ME 2013–2014)
- Stormworld (Nine Network/ABC 2010)
- The Stranger (ABC 1964–1965)
- Streetsmartz (Nine Network 2005–2006)
- Studio 3 (ABC ME 2009–2016)
- Sugar and Spice (ABC TV 1988–1989)
- Super Flying Fun Show (Nine Network 1970–1980)
- Surprises! (Nine Network 2012, 9Go! 2013–2014)
- Surviving Summer (Netflix teen drama 2022–2023)
- Swap Shop (ABC 1988–1989)
- Swinging (ABC 1997)
- Tabaluga (Seven Network 1997–2004)
- Take on Technology (ABC)
- Tarax Show (GTV-9 1957–1969)
- Tashi (ABC/7two 2014–2016)
- Teddies (9Go! 2017–2018)
- Teenage Fairytale Dropouts (Seven Network/7two 2012–2013)
- The Terrific Adventures of the Terrible Ten and The Ten Again (1960, 1964)
- Thunderstone (Network 10 1999–2001)
- Time For Kids (RTS-5A Riverland)
- Time Trackers (Seven Network 2008)
- Toasted TV (Network 10 2005–2012, 10 Peach 2012–2020)
- Tomorrow, When the War Began (ABC ME 2016)
- Total Recall (Seven Network 1994–1995)
- Totally Australia (Network 10 1997–2008)
- Totally Wild (Network 10 1992–2013, 10 Peach 2013–2020, 10 Shake 2020–2021)
- Touch the Sun (ABC 1988)
- Toybox (Seven Network 2010–2012, 7two 2013–2014)
- Tracey McBean (ABC 2001)
- Trapped (Seven Network 2008)
- ttn (Network Ten 2004–2008)
- Turn Up The Volume (ABC ME 2023–)
- The Unlisted (ABC ME 2019)
- The Upside Down Show (Nick Jr. 2006)
- Vega 4 (ABC 1968)
- Vic the Viking (Network Ten/10 Peach 2013–2015)
- Vidiot (ABC 1992–1995)
- Wandjina! (ABC 1966)
- Watch This Space (ABC 1982)
- The Wayne Manifesto (ABC 1996)
- What Do You Know? (ABC ME 2010)
- What's Up Doc? (Nine Network 1991–1999)
- Wicked Science (Network 10 2004–2006)
- Wiggle and Learn (ABC 2008)
- The Wiggles (Seven Network/ABC Television/Disney Channel/Playhouse Disney 1998–2008)
- The Wiggles' World (ABC Kids 2020)
- Wiggly Waffle (ABC 2009–2012)
- The Wild Adventures of Blinky Bill (7two 2016–2017)
- Wild Kat (Network 10 2001)
- William & Sparkles' Magical Tales (Nine Network 2010–2012, 9Go! 2013–2016)
- Wombat (Seven Network 1983–1988)
- Woobinda (Animal Doctor) (ABC/Nine Network 1968–1969)
- Wormwood (Network 10/ABC 2007)
- Worst Best Friends (Network 10 2002)
- The Worst Day of My Life (ABC 1991–1992)
- Worst Year of My Life Again (ABC ME 2014)
- Wurrawhy (Network 10 2011–2013, 10 Peach 2013–2016)
- Y? (Nine Network 1999)
- Yakkity Yak (Nickelodeon 2002–2003)
- Young Seven (HSV-7 1957–1960)
- You're Skitting Me (ABC ME 2012–2016)
- Zander featuring Alexis Hart What's Up (Seven Network 2003)
- Zoo Family (Nine Network 1985)

=== Comedy ===
- 30 Seconds (Comedy Channel 2009)
- 8MMM Aboriginal Radio (ABC 2015)
- Acropolis Now (Seven Network ATN 1989–1992)
- The Adventures of Lano and Woodley (ABC 1997–1999)
- AFHV: World's Funniest Videos (Nine Network 2009)
- After the Beep (ABC 1995)
- Aftertaste (ABC 2021–2023)
- All Aussie Adventures (Network 10 2001–2003, 2018)
- All Together Now (Nine Network 1991–1994)
- Alvin Purple (ABC 1976)
- And the Big Men Fly (ABC 1974)
- Angry Boys (ABC 2011)
- Are You Being Served? (Network Ten 1980–1981)
- At Home Alone Together (ABC 2020)
- At Home With Julia (ABC 2011)
- Audrey's Kitchen (ABC 2012–2013)
- Aunty Donna's Big Ol' House of Fun (Netflix 2020)
- Aunty Donna's Coffee Cafe (comedy ABC 2023)
- The Aunty Jack Show (ABC 1972–1973)
- Australia You're Standing In It (ABC 1983–1984)
- Australian Epic (2023)
- Australia's Sexiest Tradie (7mate 2021)
- Bachelor Gaye (Nine Network 1971)
- Back in Very Small Business (ABC 2018)
- Back Seat Drivers (ABC 2014)
- BackBerner (ABC 1999–2002)
- Bad Cop, Bad Cop (ABC 2002)
- Barley Charlie (Nine Network 1964)
- Beached Az (ABC 2009)
- Ben Elton Live From Planet Earth (Nine Network 2011)
- Big Bite (Seven Network 2003)
- The Big Gig (ABC 1989–1991)
- Big Girl's Blouse (Seven Network 1994)
- Bingles (Network Ten 1992–1993)
- Birds in the Bush (Seven Network 1972) (co-produced with the BBC in UK)
- Black Comedy (ABC 2014–2020)
- Blah Blah Blah (ABC 1988)
- The Bob Morrison Show (Nine Network 1994)
- Bobby Dazzler (Seven Network 1977–1978)
- Bogan Hunters (7mate 2014)
- Bogan Pride (SBS 2008)
- Brass Monkeys (Seven Network 1983)
- Bullpitt! (Seven Network 1997–1998)
- Caravan of Courage (Network Ten 2007–2010, Nine Network 2012)
- Chandon Pictures (Movie Extra/ABC 2007–2008)
- The Chaser Decides (ABC 2004)
- Chaser News Alert (ABC2 2005)
- The Chaser's Election Desk (ABC 2016)
- The Chaser's Media Circus (ABC 2014–2016)
- The Chaser's War on Everything (ABC 2006–2009)
- The Checkout (ABC 2013–2018)
- Chop-Socky's The Prison of Art (Foxtel 1999)
- The Cleanists (Showcase 2013–2014)
- CNNNN (ABC 2002–2003)
- The Comedy Company (Network Ten 1988–1990)
- The Comedy Game (ABC 1971–1973)
- Comedy Inc. (Nine Network 2003–2007)
- The Comedy Sale (Seven Network 1993)
- Comedy Showroom (ABC 2016)
- Comedy Slapdown (Comedy Channel 2008)
- Commercial Breakdown (Nine Network 2007–2009)
- The Company Men (ABC 1975)
- Corridors of Power (ABC 2001)
- Cuckoo in the Nest (Seven Network 1978)
- The D-Generation (ABC 1986–1987, Seven Network 1988–1989)
- DAAS Kapital (ABC 1991–1992)
- Daily at Dawn (Seven Network 1981)
- Danger 5 (SBS 2012–2015)
- Darradong Local Council (Seven Network 2023)
- The Dave & Kerley Show (V Channel 2008)
- Dave in the Life (SBS 2009–2010)
- Die On Your Feet (One 2014)
- Dirty Laundry Live (ABC2 2013–2014, ABC 2015)
- The Divorce (ABC 2015)
- Dog's Head Bay (ABC 1999)
- Dossa and Joe (ABC 2002)
- Double the Fist (ABC 2004–2008)
- Double Take (Seven Network 2009)
- Download (Network Ten 2007–2008)
- Drunk History Australia (Network 10 2020)
- Eagle & Evans (ABC 2004–2005)
- Effie, Just Quietly (SBS 2001)
- Eggshells (ABC 1991–1993)
- The Election Chaser (ABC 2001)
- The Elegant Gentleman's Guide to Knife Fighting (ABC 2013)
- The Eric Bana Show Live (Seven Network 1997)
- The Ex-PM (ABC 2015–2017)
- Fam Time (Seven Network 2024)
- The Family Law (SBS 2016–2019)
- Fancy Boy (ABC2 2016)
- Fast Forward (Seven Network 1989–1992)
- Fat Pizza: Back in Business (7mate 2019)
- Flat Chat (Nine Network 2001)
- Flipside (ABC 2002)
- Frayed (ABC 2019–2021)
- Fresh Blood (ABC 2015–2018)
- Frontline (ABC 1994–1995, 1997)
- Full Frontal (Seven Network 1993–1997, Network Ten 1998–1999)
- Fun with Frith (HSV-7 1957)
- Funky Squad (ABC 1995)
- The Games (ABC 1998–2000)
- Get Krack!n (ABC 2017–2019)
- Gillies and Company (ABC 1992)
- The Gillies Report (ABC 1984–1985)
- The Gillies Republic (ABC 1986)
- Gold Diggers (ABC 2023)
- Good Morning Mr Doubleday (ABC 1969)
- Good News Week (ABC 1996–1998, Network Ten 1999–2000, 2008–2011)
- Good News World (Network Ten 2011)
- Grass Roots (ABC 2000–2003)
- The Group (Seven Network 1971)
- Growing Up Gracefully (ABC 2017)
- Gruen Nation (ABC 2010, 2013)
- Gruen Planet (ABC 2011–2013)
- Gruen Sweat (ABC 2012)
- The Gruen Transfer (ABC 2008–2011)
- Hamish & Andy (Seven Network 2004)
- Hamish and Andy's Gap Year (Nine Network 2011–2014)
- Hamish and Andy's “Perfect” Holiday (Nine Network 2019)
- Hampton Court (Seven Network 1991)
- The Hamster Decides (ABC 2013)
- The Hamster Wheel (ABC 2011–2014)
- Here Come the Habibs (Nine Network 2016–2017)
- Here's Dawn (Nine Network 1964–1965)
- Hey Dad..! (Seven Network 1984–1994)
- Hey You! (Seven Network and Nine Network 1967)
- The Hollowmen (ABC 2008)
- House Gang (SBS 1996)
- Housos (SBS 2011–2013)
- Housos vs. Virus – The Lockdown (7mate 2020)
- How Not to Behave (ABC 2015)
- How the Quest Was Won (ABC 2004–2005)
- How to Stay Married (Network Ten 2018–2021)
- Hughesy, We Have a Problem (Network Ten 2018–2021)
- I Rock (ABC2 2010)
- In Harmer's Way (ABC 1990)
- Introducing Gary Petty (The Comedy Channel 2000)
- It's a Date (ABC 2013–2014)
- I've Married A Bachelor (ABC 1968–1969)
- Ja'mie: Private School Girl (ABC 2013)
- The Jesters (Movie Extra 2009–2011)
- Jimeoin (Seven Network 1994–1995)
- Joan and Leslie (Seven Network 1969)
- John Safran vs God (SBS 2004)
- John Safran's Music Jamboree (SBS 2002)
- John Safran's Race Relations (ABC 2009)
- Jonah from Tonga (ABC 2014)
- The Joy of Sets (Nine Network 2011)
- Judith Lucy Is All Woman (ABC 2015)
- Judith Lucy's Spiritual Journey (ABC 2011)
- Just for Laughs (Nine Network 2007)
- Just For Laughs Australia (Network 10 2013–2023) (Fox Comedy 2013–2023)
- Just Kidding! (Nine Network 1993–1996)
- The Katering Show (ABC 2015–2016)
- Kath & Kim (ABC 2002–2004, Seven Network 2007)
- Kenny's World (Network Ten 2008)
- Kick (SBS 2007)
- Kidspeak (Seven Network 1998)
- Kiki and Kitty (ABC Comedy 2017)
- Kingswood Country (Seven Network 1980–1984)
- Kinne (7mate 2014–2015)
- Kinne Tonight (Network Ten 2018–2019)
- Kittson Fahey (ABC 1992–1993)
- Koala Man (Hulu 2023)
- Laid (ABC 2011–2012)
- The Last of the Australians (Nine Network 1975)
- Late For School (Network Ten 1992)
- The Late Show (ABC 1992–1993)
- Lawrence Leung's Choose Your Own Adventure (ABC 2009)
- Lawrence Leung's Unbelievable (ABC 2011)
- Legally Brown (SBS 2013–2014)
- Leongatha (Channel 31 2013)
- Let the Blood Run Free (Network Ten 1990–1994)
- Let Loose Live (Seven Network 2005)
- The Letdown (ABC 2017–2019)
- Let's Talk About (Presto/Foxtel 2015–2017)
- The Librarians (ABC 2007–2010)
- Life Support (SBS 2004)
- LOL: Last One Laughing (Apple TV+ 2020)
- Look and Laugh (ATN-7 1958–1959)
- Lowdown (ABC 2010–2013)
- Luke Warm Sex (ABC 2016)
- Lunatics (Netflix 2019)
- Magda's Funny Bits (Nine Network 2006)
- The Mansion (Comedy Channel 2008)
- Mark Loves Sharon (Network Ten 2008)
- Marx and Venus (SBS 2007)
- The Mavis Bramston Show (Seven Network 1964)
- Maximum Choppage (ABC2 2015)
- The Merrick & Rosso Show (Comedy Channel 2008–2009)
- Merrick and Rosso Unplanned (Nine Network 2003–2004)
- The Micallef Program (ABC 1998–2001)
- Micallef Tonight (Nine Network 2003)
- The Mick Molloy Show (Nine Network 1999)
- Micro Nation (Eleven 2012)
- Mikey, Pubs and Beer Nuts (Network Ten 2000)
- The Money or the Gun (ABC 1992)
- Monster House (Nine Network 2008)
- A Moody Christmas (ABC 2012)
- The Moodys (ABC 2014)
- The Moth Effect (Amazon Prime 2021)
- Mr. Black (Network Ten 2019)
- Mrs. Finnegan (Seven Network 1969)
- Mulray (Seven Network 1994–1995)
- My Two Wives (Nine Network 1992)
- The Naked Vicar Show (Seven Network 1977–1978)
- The Nation (Nine Network 2007)
- Newlyweds (Seven Network 1993–1994)
- News Free Zone (ABC 1985)
- Newstopia (SBS 2007–2008)
- A Nice Day at the Office (ABC 1971–1972)
- Nice 'n Juicy (ABC 1966–1967)
- No Activity (Stan 2015–2018)
- No Thanks, I'm on a Diet (ABC 1976)
- The Norman Gunston Show (Seven Network 1975–1979)
- One Size Fits All (ABC 2000)
- Open Slather (Comedy Channel 2015)
- Orange Is the New Brown (Seven Network 2018)
- The Other Guy (Stan 2017–2020)
- Our Man in Canberra (ABC 1971–1972)
- Our Man in the Company (ABC 1973–1974)
- Outland (ABC 2012)
- Pacific Heat (Comedy Channel/Eleven 2016)
- Pat's Late Night Coffee Revival (Channel 31 2004)
- The Paul Hogan Show (Nine Network 1973–1984)
- Pizza (SBS 2000–2007)
- Please Like Me (ABC2 2013–2016)
- Plonk (Eleven 2014, Stan/Nine 2015)
- Preppers (ABC 2021)
- The Private World of Miss Prim (1966)
- Problems (ABC 2012)
- Ratbags (Network Ten 1981)
- Question Everything (ABC 2021–2025)
- Real Stories (Network Ten 2006)
- Regular Old Bogan (7mate 2020)
- Retrograde (ABC 2020)
- Review with Myles Barlow (ABC 2008–2011)
- The Rise and Fall of Wellington Boots (ABC 1975)
- Rita and Wally (Seven Network 1968)
- The Roast (ABC2 2012–2014)
- The Ronnie Johns Half Hour (Network Ten 2006)
- Ronny Chieng: International Student (ABC 2016–2017)
- Rosehaven (ABC 2016–2021)
- Rostered On (Netflix 2018, 7mate 2019)
- Rubbery Figures (ABC 1987–1990)
- The Rumpus Room with Darren & Brose (Channel 31 1999–2002)
- Russell Coight's All Aussie Adventures (Network Ten 2002–2004, 2018)
- The Russell Gilbert Show (Nine Network 1998, 2000–2001)
- Sammy J & Randy in Ricketts Lane (ABC 2015)
- Sando (ABC 2018)
- Scattergood: Friend of All (ABC 1975)
- Shaun Micallef's Mad as Hell (ABC 2012–2022)
- Shock, Horror, Aunty! (ABC 2012–2013)
- Shock Jock (Foxtel/ABC 2001–2002)
- Sit Down, Shut Up (Network Ten 2000)
- SkitHOUSE (Network Ten 2003)
- Sleuth 101 (ABC 2010)
- The Slot (The Comedy Channel 2017)
- Small Time Gangster (Movie Extra 2011)
- Smiling Friends (Adult Swim 2022–2026)
- Snake Gully with Dad and Dave (Seven Network 1972)
- Soul Mates (ABC 2014–2016)
- Speaking in Tongues (SBS 2005–2006)
- Squinters (ABC 2018–2019)
- The Strange Calls (ABC2 2012)
- Street Smart (Network Ten 2018)
- Stupid, Stupid Man (TV1/ABC 2006–2007)
- Summer Heights High (ABC 2007)
- Summer Love (ABC 2022)
- Supernova (BBC/UKTV 2005)
- Superwog (ABC Comedy 2018–2021)
- Surprise Surprise (Nine Network 2000–2001)
- Surprise Surprise Gotcha (Nine Network 2007)
- Swift and Shift Couriers (SBS 2008–2011)
- Taboo (Network Ten 2019)
- Take That (HSV-7 1957–1959)
- Talkin' 'Bout Your Generation (Network Ten 2009–2012, Nine Network 2018–2019)
- Thank God You're Here (Network Ten 2006–2007, Seven Network 2009)
- This is Littleton (ABC2 2014)
- This Week Live (Network Ten 2013)
- Three Men of the City (ABC 1974)
- The Thursday Creek Mob (ABC 1971)
- Timothy (ABC 2014)
- Tomorrow Tonight (ABC 2018)
- Tonightly with Tom Ballard (ABC Comedy 2017–2018)
- The True Blue Show (Seven Network 1973–1974)
- True Story with Hamish & Andy (Nine Network 2017–2018)
- TV Burp (Seven Network 2009)
- TwentyfourSeven (SBS 2002)
- Twentysomething (ABC 2011, 2013)
- The Unbelievable Truth (Seven Network 2012)
- Under the Milky Way (Channel 31 2016)
- Unreal Ads (Network Ten 2000)
- Unreal TV (Network Ten 1999)
- Upper Middle Bogan (ABC 2013–2017)
- The Urban Monkey with Murray Foote (ABC/ABC2 2009)
- Us and Them (Nine Network 1995)
- Very Small Business (ABC 2008)
- The Warehouse Comedy Festival (ABC 2012)
- The Warriors (ABC 2017)
- We Can Be Heroes: Finding The Australian of the Year (ABC 2005)
- We Interrupt This Broadcast (Seven Network 2023)
- The Wedge (Network Ten 2006–2007)
- Wedlocked (Seven Network 1994)
- Wednesday Night Fever (ABC 2013)
- Welcher & Welcher (ABC 2003)
- Wellmania (Netflix 2023)
- Wham Bam Thank You Ma'am (ABC2 2016)
- Whatever Happened to That Guy? (Comedy Channel 2009)
- Who Do You Think You Are? (ABC 1976)
- Whose Line is it Anyway? (Comedy Channel 2016)
- Why Are You Like This (ABC/ABC TV Plus 2018)
- Wilfred (SBS 2007–2009)
- Willing and Abel (Nine Network 1987)
- The Wizards of Aus (SBS2 2016)
- Woodley (ABC 2012)
- YOLO (Adult Swim 2020)

=== Documentaries ===
- 50 Years of ABC TV (ABC 2016)
- The ABC of Our Lives – 50 Years of Television (ABC 2006)
- The Amazing 80s (Nine Network 2013)
- The Amazing 90s (Nine Network 2015)
- The Amazing Noughties (Nine Network 2016)
- Asking for It (SBS 2023)
- Australian Druglords (Nine Network 2010)
- Australian Families of Crime (Nine Network 2010)
- Australian Wildlife (ABC 1963)
- Australia's Best Competition Competition (ABC 2022)
- Australia's Wild Odyssey (factual ABC 2023–)
- The Big School Swap (SBS 2023–)
- The Black Hand (factual ABC 2023–)
- Blue Water Empire (ABC 2019)
- Books that Made Us (ABC 2021)
- Bush Tucker Man (ABC 1987–1990)
- Carbon: The Unauthorised Biography (ABC 2022)
- Celebrating 50 Years: Reporting the Nation (ABC 2006)
- Celebrating 50 Years: Reporting the World (ABC 2006)
- Con Girl (Seven Network 2023)
- Crime Investigation Australia (CI/Nine Network 2005–2010)
- The Daters (ABC 2014)
- Decadence (SBS)
- The Family Court Murders (2022)
- The First Inventors (Network 10/NITV 2023)
- First Weapons (factual ABC 2023–)
- Forensic Investigators (Seven Network 2004–2006)
- Gangs of Oz (Seven Network 2009–2010)
- The Gift (Nine Network 2007–2009)
- Global Village (SBS 1998–2015)
- Great Australian Stuff (ABC 2023–)
- Hawke: The Larrikin & The Leader (2018)
- Help (SBS 2006)
- Hipsters (SBS 2015)
- Home Truths (ABC 1995)
- Housemates (ABC 2016–2017)
- Howard on Menzies: The Making of Modern Australia (ABC 2016)
- The Howard Years (ABC 2016)
- The Hunter (ABC News 24 2012)
- Inside Australia (SBS 2003–2009)
- Inside Sydney Airport (SBS 2023)
- Ithaka: A Fight to Free Julian Assange (2022)
- The Killing Season (ABC 2015)
- Labor in Power (ABC 2016)
- Look Me In The Eye (SBS 2017)
- Million Dollar Cold Case (Seven Network 2017)
- Miriam Margolyes: Almost Australian (ABC 2020)
- Miriam Margolyes: Australia Unmasked (ABC 2022)
- Missing Persons Unit (Nine Network 2006–2010)
- Murder Calls Australia (Nine Network 2017)
- Murder Uncovered (Seven Network 2017)
- My Space is an Amazing Place (SBS)
- New Look at New Guinea (ABC 1959–1960)
- Opening Shot (ABC2 2012–2015)
- Outback House (ABC 2005)
- Palazzo di Cozzo: The Australian Dream. Italian Style. (2022)
- Parent Rescue (SBS 2007)
- Pauline Hanson: Please Explain! (SBS 2016)
- Podlove (SBS 2007)
- Queerstralia (ABC 2023–)
- Redesign My Brain (ABC 2013–2015)
- A River Somewhere (ABC 1975)
- Saltwater Heroes (Discovery Channel 2015)
- Secrets of Our Cities (SBS 2017–2020)
- Shaun Micallef's On The Sauce (ABC 2020)
- Shaun Micallef's Stairway to Heaven (SBS 2015–2016)
- Sporting Nation (ABC 2012)
- Storyline Australia (SBS 2004–2007)
- Struggle Street (SBS 2015)
- Sydney Grows Up (ABC 1958)
- Sydney Harbour Patrol (Discovery Channel 2016)
- This Is Brazil! (SBS ONE 2014)
- Time of My Life (7TWO 2013)
- Tony Robinson's Time Walks (The History Channel 2013–2014, ABC 2016)
- Tough Nuts: Australia's Hardest Criminals (Crime & Investigation Network 2010–2012)
- Two of Us (SBS 2006)
- Who Makes The News? (ABC News 24 2012, ABC 2013)
- Wide Open Road (ABC 2011)
- The World Around Us (Seven Network 1979–2006)
- World Tales (SBS)

=== Drama ===
- 600 Bottles of Wine (Network Ten 2018)
- 800 Words (Seven Network 2015–2018)
- Above the Law (Network Ten 2000)
- After the Deluge (Network Ten 2003)
- After the Verdict (Nine Network 2022)
- Against the Wind (Seven Network 1978) (mini-series)
- The Alice (Nine Network 2005)
- All the Rivers Run (Seven Network 1983) (mini-series)
- All the Rivers Run 2 (Seven Network 1990) (mini-series)
- All Saints (Seven Network 1998–2009)
- All the Way (Nine Network 1988)
- Always Greener (Seven Network 2001–2004)
- Answered By Fire (ABC 2006)
- ANZAC Girls (ABC 2014)
- Anzacs (Nine Network 1985) (mini-series)
- The Artful Dodger (Disney+ 2023)
- Australian Gangster (Seven Network 2021)
- Australians (ABC 1996) (also known as Michael Willesee's Australians)
- Back to the Rafters (Amazon Prime 2021)
- Bad Behaviour (Stan 2022)
- Bad Mothers (Nine Network 2019)
- Bali 2002 (Nine Network and Stan 2022)
- Banished (BBC First 2015)
- Barons (ABC 2022)
- Barracuda (ABC 2016)
- Barrier Reef (ABC 1971–1972)
- Bastard Boys (ABC 2007) (mini-series)
- The Battlers (Seven Network 1968)
- Bay of Fires (ABC 2023–2025)
- Beat of the City (ABC 1975)
- The Beautiful Lie (ABC 2015)
- Bed of Roses (ABC 2008–2011)
- Bellamy (Network Ten 1981)
- Ben Hall (ABC 1975)
- Better Man (SBS1 2013)
- Between Two Worlds (Seven Network 2020)
- Big Sky (Network Ten 1997–1999)
- Bikie Wars: Brothers in Arms (Network Ten 2012)
- Bite Club (Nine Network 2018)
- Black Snow (Stan 2022–)
- BlackJack (Network Ten 2003–2007)
- Bloom (Stan 2019–2021)
- Blue Heelers (Seven Network 1994–2006)
- Blue Murder (ABC 1995) (mini-series)
- Blue Murder: Killer Cop (Seven Network 2017) (mini-series)
- Bluey (Seven Network 1976–1977)
- Bodyline (Network Ten 1984) (mini-series)
- Boney (Seven Network 1972)
- Bordertown (ABC 1995)
- Boy Swallows Universe (Netflix 2024)
- Brides of Christ (ABC 1991) (mini-series)
- Brock (Network Ten 2016)
- The Broken Shore (telemovie ABC 2014)
- Bump (Stan 2021–2025)
- Canal Road (Nine Network 2008)
- Captain James Cook (Australian/German co-production) (Network Ten 1987) (mini-series)
- Carla Cametti PD (SBS 2009)
- Case for the Defence (Network Ten 1978)
- Cash and Company (Seven Network 1975)
- Castaways (ABC 1973)
- Catching Milat (Seven Network 2015)
- Catwalk (ABC 1972)
- C*A*U*G*H*T (Stan drama 2023–)
- Chances (Nine Network 1991–1992)
- Changi (ABC 2001) (mini-series)
- Children's Hospital (ABC 1997–1998)
- Chopper Squad (Network Ten 1976–1979)
- The Circuit (SBS 2007–2009)
- City Homicide (Seven Network 2007–2011)
- The Claremont Murders (Seven Network 2023–)
- Class of '07 (Amazon Prime Video 2023)
- The Clearing (Disney+ 2023)
- Cleverman (ABC 2016–2017)
- Cloudstreet (Showcase 2011) (mini-series)
- Cluedo (Nine Network 1992)
- The Code (ABC 2014–2016)
- Colour in the Creek (Nine Network 1985)
- The Commons (Stan 2019)
- Consider Your Verdict (Seven Network 1961)
- Conspiracy 365 (Showcase 2012)
- Contrabandits (ABC 1967–1968)
- The Cooks (Network Ten 2004)
- Cop Shop (Seven Network 1977–1984)
- Cops L.A.C. (Nine Network 2010)
- A Country Practice (Seven Network 1981–1993, Network Ten 1994)
- CrashBurn (Network Ten 2003)
- Crownies (ABC 2011)
- The Cry (ABC 2019)
- The Cut (ABC 2009)
- The Damnation of Harvey McHugh (ABC 1994)
- Dangerous (FOX8 2007)
- Darby and Joan (Acorn 2022)
- The Day of the Roses (Network Ten 1998) (mini-series)
- Dead Lucky (SBS 2018)
- Dead Men Running (ABC 1971)
- Deadline Gallipoli (Showtime 2015) (mini-series)
- Deadloch (Amazon Prime comedy 2023)
- Deep Water (SBS 2016)
- Delta (ABC 1969–1970)
- Devil's Playground (Showcase 2014)
- Diary of an Uber Driver (ABC 2019)
- A Difficult Woman (ABC 1998) (mini-series)
- Dirt Game (ABC 2009)
- The Dirtwater Dynasty (Network Ten 1988) (mini-series)
- The Dismissal (Network Ten 1983) (mini-series)
- Division 4 (Nine Network 1969–1975)
- Divorce Court (Nine Network 1967)
- The Doctor Blake Mysteries (ABC 2013–2017)
- Doctor Doctor (Nine Network 2016–2021)
- Dogwoman (Nine Network 2000)
- Dynasty (ABC 1970–1971)
- East of Everything (ABC 2008–2009)
- East West 101 (SBS 2007–2011)
- Eden (Stan 2021)
- Embassy (ABC 1990–1992)
- Emergency (Nine Network and Seven Network 1959)
- The Emigrants (ABC 1977)
- The End (Binge 2021)
- Erotic Stories (SBS 2023)
- Fake (Paramount+ 2024)
- Fallen Angels (ABC 1997)
- The Far Country (ABC 1972)
- The Far Country (ABC 1987)
- Fat Tony & Co. (Nine Network 2014)
- The Feds (Nine Network 1993–1996)
- Fighting Season (Showcase 2018)
- Fire (Seven Network 1995–1996)
- Firebite (AMC 2021
- Fireflies (ABC 2004)
- Fires (ABC 2021)
- Five Bedrooms (Network 10 2019, Paramount+ 2021–2023)
- The Flying Doctors (Nine Network 1987–1991)
- For the Term of His Natural Life (Nine Network 1983) (mini-series)
- The Fourth Wish (ABC 1974)
- Friday On My Mind (ABC 2017) (mini-series)
- G.P. (ABC 1989–1996)
- Gallipoli (Nine Network 2015)
- The Girl from Steel City (SBS 1986)
- Glitch (ABC 2015–2019)
- The Gloaming (Stan 2020)
- The Godfathers (Nine Network 1971–1972)
- The Gods of Wheat Street (ABC 2014)
- Going Home (SBS 2000–2001)
- Golden Pennies (ABC 1985)
- Good Guys Bad Guys (Nine Network 1997–1998)
- Great Australian Walks with Julia Zemiro (factual/documentary SBS 2023–)
- Halifax f.p. (Nine Network 1994–2001, 2020–)
- The Harp in the South (Network Ten 1987)
- Harrow (ABC 2018–2021)
- The Haunted School (ABC 1986)
- Head Start (ABC 2001)
- headLand (Seven Network 2005–2006)
- Heartbreak High (Netflix 2022–2025)
- Heartland (ABC 1994) (mini-series)
- Here Out West (ABC 2022)
- Hiding (ABC 2015)
- Hoges (Seven Network 2017)
- Homicide (Seven Network 1964–1976)
- House Gang (ABC 1996)
- House Husbands (Nine Network 2012–2017)
- House of Gods (ABC 2024)
- House of Hancock (Nine Network 2015)
- The House on the Corner (ATN-7 1957)
- House Rules (SBS 1988)
- Howzat! Kerry Packer's War (Nine Network 2012) (mini-series)
- Human Error (Nine Network 2024)
- Hungry Ghosts (SBS 2020)
- The Hungry Ones (ABC 1963)
- Hunter (ABC 1967–1969)
- The Hunting (SBS 2019)
- Hyde and Seek (Nine Network 2016)
- In Limbo (ABC 2023)
- In Our Blood (ABC 2023–)
- The Incredible Journey of Mary Bryant (Network Ten 2005) (mini-series)
- Informer 3838 (Nine Network 2020)
- Inside Running (ABC 1981)
- Invisible Boys (Stan 2025)
- INXS: Never Tear Us Apart (Seven Network 2014)
- Irreverent (Peacock/Netflix 2022)
- Jack Irish (ABC 2012–2021)
- Janet King (ABC 2014–2017)
- Janus (ABC 1994–1995)
- Jessica (Network Ten 2004)
- Jonah (Seven Network 1962)
- Kangaroo Palace (Seven Network 1997)
- The Kettering Incident (Showcase 2016)
- The Killing Field (Seven Network 2014)
- Killing Time (TV1 2011)
- King's Men (Seven Network 1976)
- Kirby's Company (ABC 1977)
- Lambs of God (Fox Showcase 2019)
- Last Days of the Space Age (Disney+ 2024)
- Last King of the Cross (drama Paramount+ 2023–)
- Last Man Standing (Seven Network 2005)
- The Last Resort (ABC 1988–1989)
- Law of the Land (Nine Network 1993)
- Les Norton (ABC 2019)
- Lie With Me (Network Ten 2021)
- The Link Men (Nine Network 1970)
- Little Oberon (Nine Network 2005) (telemovie)
- The Long Arm (Network Ten 1970)
- The Lost Flowers of Alice Hart (Amazon Prime 2023)
- Love Bytes (Fox8 2004)
- Love Child (Nine Network 2014–2017)
- Love Is a Four Letter Word (ABC 2001)
- Love Me (Binge 2021–2023)
- Love My Way (FOX8 2004, W 2005, Showcase 2006)
- Lucky Colour Blue (ABC 1976)
- Luke's Kingdom (Nine Network 1976)
- The Man From Snowy River (Nine Network 1993–1996) (also known in the United States as Snowy River: The McGregor Saga)
- Marion (ABC 1974)
- Marking Time (ABC 2003) (mini-series)
- Marshall Law (Seven Network 2002)
- Matlock Police (Network Ten 1971–1975)
- McLeod's Daughters (Nine Network 2001–2009)
- MDA (ABC 2002–2005)
- Medivac (Network Ten 1996–1998)
- Menotti (ABC 1980–1981)
- Mercury (ABC 1996)
- The Messenger (ABC 2023)
- Miss Fisher's Murder Mysteries (ABC 2012–2015)
- Molly (Seven Network 2016)
- More Than This (Paramount+ 2022)
- More Winners (ABC 1990)
- Mr & Mrs Murder (Network Ten 2013)
- Mr Inbetween (Fox Showcase 2018–2021)
- Mrs Biggs (ITV/Seven Network 2012)
- Ms Fisher's Modern Murder Mysteries (Seven Network 2019, Acorn TV 2021)
- Murder Call (Nine Network 1997–1999)
- The Murray Whelan Series (ABC 2004)
- My Brother Jack (ABC 1965)
- My Brother Jack (ABC 2001)
- Mystery Road (ABC 2018–2020)
- Naked: Stories of Men (ABC 1996)
- The Narrow Road to the Deep North (Amazon Prime 2025)
- New Gold Mountain (SBS 2021)
- The Newsreader (ABC 2021–2025)
- Newton's Law (ABC 201
- North Shore (Network 10 2023–)
- Offspring (Network Ten 2010–2014, 2016–2017)
- Old School (ABC 2014)
- Olivia Newton-John: Hopelessly Devoted to You (Seven Network 2018)
- On the Ropes (SBS 2018)
- One Night (Paramount+ 2023)
- Operation Buffalo (ABC 2020)
- The Outcasts (ABC 1960)
- The Outsiders (ABC 1976–1977)
- Over the Hill (Seven Network 1994–1995)
- Over There (ABC 1972–1973)
- Packed to the Rafters (Seven Network 2008–2013)
- Paper Dolls (Paramount+ 2023)
- Paper Giants: Magazine Wars (ABC 2013)
- Pastures of the Blue Crane (ABC 1969)
- Party Tricks (Network Ten 2014)
- The Patriots (ABC 1962)
- Patrol Boat (ABC 1979–1980)
- The People Next Door (Nine Network 1973)
- Peter Allen: Not The Boy Next Door (Seven Network 2015) (mini-series)
- Phoenix (ABC 1992–1993)
- Picnic at Hanging Rock (Showcase 2018)
- Pig in a Poke (ABC 1977)
- Pine Gap (2018)
- A Place To Call Home (Seven Network 2013–2014, SoHo 2015, Showcase 2016–2018)
- Playing for Keeps (Network Ten 2018–2019)
- Police Rescue (ABC 1991–1996)
- Poor Man's Orange (Network Ten 1989) (mini-series)
- The Potato Factory (Seven Network 2000) (mini-series)
- Power Games: The Packer-Murdoch War (Nine Network 2013) (mini-series)
- Power Without Glory (ABC 1976)
- The Principal (SBS 2015) (mini-series)
- Prosper (Stan 2024–)
- Puberty Blues (Network Ten 2012–2014)
- Pulse (ABC 2017)
- The Purple Jacaranda (ABC 1964)
- Rafferty's Rules (Seven Network 1987–1990)
- Rain Shadow (ABC 2007)
- Rake (ABC 2010–2018)
- RAN (Remote Area Nurse) (SBS 2006)
- Redfern Now (ABC 2012–2015)
- Reef Doctors (Network Ten, Eleven 2013)
- Rescue: Special Ops (Nine Network 2009–2011)
- Restoration (9Go! 2016)
- R.F.D.S. (Nine Network 1992–1993)
- Ride on Stranger (ABC 1979) (mini-series)
- Riptide (Seven Network 1969)
- Riptide (Network 10 2023–)
- Robbery Under Arms (ABC 1985)
- Romper Stomper (Stan 2018)
- Rush (ABC 1974–1976)
- Rush (Network Ten 2008–2011)
- Ryan (Seven Network 1973–1974)
- Safe Harbour (SBS 2018)
- Safe Home (SBS 2023)
- Satisfaction (Showcase 2007–2010)
- Savage River (ABC 2022)
- Scales of Justice (ABC 1983)
- Schapelle (Nine Network 2014)
- Scorched (Nine Network 2008)
- Sea Patrol (Nine Network 2007–2011)
- SeaChange (ABC 1998–2000, Nine Network 2019)
- Secret Bridesmaids' Business (Seven Network 2019)
- Secret City (Showcase 2016–2019)
- The Secret Daughter (Seven Network 2016–2017)
- The Secret Life of Us (Network Ten 2001–2005)
- The Secret River (ABC 2015) (mini-series)
- Secrets (ABC 1993)
- Secrets & Lies (Network Ten 2014)
- The Secrets She Keeps (Network 10 2020–2022)
- See How They Run (ABC/BBC 1999)
- Serangoon Road (ABC 2013)
- Serpent in the Rainbow (ABC 1973)
- Seven Types of Ambiguity (ABC 2017)
- Shannon's Mob (Nine Network 1975–1976)
- The Shark Net (ABC 2003)
- Shark's Paradise (Network Ten 1986)
- Shell Presents (1959–1960)
- Significant Others (ABC 2022)
- The Silence (ABC 2006) (mini-series)
- Silent Number (Nine Network 1974–1976)
- Sisters (Network Ten 2017)
- Skirts (Seven Network 1990)
- The Slap (ABC 2011)
- Slide (FOX8 2011)
- Small Claims (Network Ten 2005–2006)
- Snowy (Nine Network 1993)
- Solo One (Seven Network 1976)
- Special Squad (Network Ten 1984)
- Spirited (W 2010–2011)
- The Spoiler (Nine Network 1972)
- Spreadsheet (Paramount+ 2022)
- Spyforce (ABC 1971–1973)
- Stacey's Gym (ABC 1974)
- Stark (ABC/BBC 1993)
- Starting From … Now! (SBS2 2015–2016)
- State Coroner (Network Ten 1997–1998)
- Stateless (ABC 2020)
- Stingers (Nine Network 1998–2004)
- Stormy Petrel (ABC 1960)
- The Story of Peter Grey (Seven Network 1961)
- The Straits (ABC 2012)
- Strife (Binge 2023–2025)
- The Strip (Nine Network 2008)
- Sun on the Stubble (ABC 1996) (also known as The Valley Between)
- Sunshine (SBS 2017)
- The Surgeon (Network Ten 2005)
- Sweat (Network Ten 1996)
- Sweet and Sour (ABC 1984)
- Sword of Honour (Seven Network 1986)
- The Tailings (SBS 2021)
- Tales of the South Seas (Network Ten 1998)
- Tanamera – Lion of Singapore (Network Ten 1989)
- Tandarra (Seven Network 1976)
- Tangle (Showcase 2009–2012)
- A Taste for Blue Ribbons (ABC 1973)
- Tenko (ABC/BBC 1981–1984)
- Territory (Netflix 2024)
- The Thorn Birds (Nine Network 1983) (American production) (mini-series)
- A Thousand Skies (Seven Network 1985) (mini-series)
- Three Forever (SBS 1998)
- Tidelands (Netflix 2018)
- The Time Of Our Lives (ABC 2013–2014)
- Timelapse (ABC 1980)
- The Timeless Land (ABC 1980) (mini-series)
- Top of the Lake (UKTV 2013, BBC First 2017, ABC 2015–2020)
- Total Control (ABC 2019–2024)
- A Touch of Reverence (ABC 1974)
- The Tourist (Stan 2022)
- A Town Like Alice (Seven Network 1981)
- Tricky Business (Nine Network 2012)
- Tripping Over (Network Ten 2006))
- Troppo (ABC 2022)
- The Truckies (ABC 1978)
- True Colours (SBS 2022)
- The Twelve (2022–2025)
- Twisted Tales (Nine Network 1996)
- Two Twisted (Nine Network 2006)
- Underbelly (Nine Network 2008)
- Underbelly: Badness (Nine Network 2012)
- Underbelly Files: Chopper (Nine Network 2018)
- Underbelly: The Golden Mile (Nine Network 2010)
- Underbelly: Razor (Nine Network 2011)
- Underbelly: Squizzy (Nine Network 2013)
- Underbelly: A Tale of Two Cities (Nine Network 2009)
- Underbelly: Vanishing Act (Nine Network 2022)
- The Unloved (Nine Network 1968)
- The Unusual Suspects (SBS 2021)
- Upright (Foxtel Showcase 2019)
- The Violent Earth (Network Ten 1998)
- Wake In Fright (Network Ten 2017)
- Wakefield (ABC 2021)
- Wanted (Seven Network 2016–2017)
- Warnie (Nine Network 2023–)
- Water Rats (Nine Network 1996–2001)
- Wentworth (SoHo 2013–2015, Fox Showcase 2017–2021, ABC 2018–2021)
- While the Men Are Away (SBS 2023–)
- Whiplash (Seven Network 1961)
- White Collar Blue (Network Ten 2002–2003)
- Wild Boys (Seven Network 2011)
- Wildside (ABC 1997–1999)
- Winners (ABC 1985)
- Winners and Losers (Seven Network 2011–2016)
- Winter (Seven Network 2015)
- Wolf Creek (Stan/Nine Network 2016–2018)
- Women of the Sun (ABC 1981) (mini-series)
- Wonderland (Network Ten 2013–2015)
- The Wrong Girl (Network Ten 2016–2017)
- Year Of (Stan 2023–)
- Young Lions (Nine Network 2002)
- Young Ramsay (Seven Network 1977–1979)

=== Factual ===
- 72 Dangerous Animals: Asia (Netflix 2018)
- 72 Dangerous Animals: Latin America (Netflix 2017)
- 8 Nights Out West (ABC 2022)
- Advancing Australia (Network Ten 2021)
- AFP (Nine Network 2011)
- Air Ways (Seven Network 2009–2012)
- Animal Emergency (Nine Network 2007–2009)
- Animals Aboard with Dr Harry (Seven Network 2023)
- Any Questions (ABC 1958–1960)
- Australia Behind Bars (Nine Network 2022)
- Beach Cops (Seven Network 2015–2016)
- Better Date Than Never (ABC 2023)
- Beyond 2000 (Seven Network 1985–1993, Network Ten 1993–1995, 1999)
- Beyond Tomorrow (Seven Network 2005–2006)
- BIG - Extreme Makeover (Nine Network 2011)
- Blokesworld (Channel 31, Aurora, 7mate, One 2003–2016)
- Bondi Ink (Eleven 2015–2017)
- Bondi Vet (Network Ten 2009–2016)
- Bondi Vet: Coast to Coast (Nine Network 2019)
- Books and Authors (ATN-7 1956–1957)
- Bush Doctors (Seven Network 2008)
- Changing Faces (Style 2015)
- The Checkout (ABC 2013–2018)
- Class Of... (Network Ten 2012)
- Coastwatch Oz (Seven Network 2014)
- The Code (Nine Network 2007)
- Come In on This (ABC 1959)
- Court Justice: Sydney (Foxtel Crime + Investigation Network 2017) (Style 2015)
- Crash Investigation Unit (Seven Network 2008)
- Demonstrations in Physics (ABC 1969)
- Dr. Lisa to the Rescue (Nine Network 2015–2017)
- Dumb, Drunk and Racist (ABC 2012)
- Dynasties (ABC 2011)
- The Embassy (Nine Network 2014–2016)
- Emergency Call (Seven Network 2018–2019)
- Employable Me (ABC 2018)
- Face the Nation (GTV-9 1958–1959)
- Family Confidential (ABC 2012–2015)
- Family Footsteps (ABC 2006–2008)
- Fashion Bloggers (Style 2014–2015)
- Find My Family (Seven Network 2008–2010)
- Fire 000 (Nine Network 2008)
- First Contact (SBS 2014–2016)
- Go Back to Where You Came From (SBS 2011–2012, 2015)
- Going Places (Nine Network 2007)
- Gold Coast Cops (Network Ten 2014–2015)
- Gold Coast Medical (Seven Network 2016–2017)
- Great Expectations (ABC 2013)
- Hatch, Match & Dispatch (ABC 2016)
- Head First (ABC2 2013, ABC 2014)
- Health (ABC 1959)
- Inside Central Station (SBS 2021)
- Inside the Sydney Opera House (ABC 2022)
- Instant People (Seven Network 1962–1963)
- Islands of Oz (Seven Network 2016)
- Julia Zemiro's Home Delivery (ABC 2013)
- Kalgoorlie Cops (Crime & Investigation Network 2011)
- Kings Cross ER: St Vincent's Hospital (Foxtel Crime + Investigation Network 2012–2015)
- Last Chance Surgery (Seven Network 2009)
- Life on the Outside (SBS 2022–)
- Long Lost Family (Network Ten 2016)
- Medical Emergency (Seven Network 2005–2010)
- Meet the Penguins (ABC 2022)
- MegaTruckers (A&E Australia 2013–2015)
- Melbourne Composers (ABC 1961–196?)
- Melbourne Magazine (ABV-2 1957)
- Missing Pieces (Nine Network 2009)
- Money (Nine Network 1993–2002, 2002–2006)
- Nature Notebook (ABV-2 1958)
- New Leash on Life (ABC 2023)
- Nurses (Seven Network 2021)
- Old People's Home for 4 Year Olds (ABC 2019)
- Old People's Home for Teenagers (ABC 2022)
- One Born Every Minute Australia (Network Ten 2019)
- Outback Adventures (ABC 1997)
- Outback ER (ABC 2015)
- Outback Wildlife Rescue (Seven Network 2008–2010)
- Pawn Stars Australia (A&E 2015)
- Photo Finish (ABC 2012)
- Picture Page (ABC 1957)
- Police Files: Unlocked (Seven Network 2006–2007)
- The Real Seachange (Seven Network 2006–2007)
- Recruits (Network Ten 2009–2010)
- Recruits: Paramedics (Network Ten 2011)
- Road Safety (GTV-9 1957)
- Royal Flying Doctor Service (Nine Network 2007)
- RPA (Nine Network 1995–2012)
- RSPCA Animal Rescue (Seven Network 2007–2010)
- Saving Babies (Network Ten 2007)
- Saving Kids (Network Ten 2008)
- Science Today (ABC 1958)
- Search and Rescue (Nine Network 2008)
- The Secret Life of 4 Year Olds (Network Ten 2018)
- Shitsville Express (ABC 2013)
- Southern Ocean Live (ABC 2022)
- Space 22 (ABC 2022)
- Stargazing Live (ABC 2017–2018)
- Steve Irwin's Wildlife Warriors (Network Ten 2012)
- Streets of Your Town (ABC 2016)
- Sudden Impact (Nine Network 2008)
- Surf Patrol (Seven Network 2007–2010)
- Surveillance Oz (Seven Network 2012–2016)
- Thalu (NITV/ABC ME 2020)
- This Is Your Life (Seven Network 1975–1980, Nine Network 1995–2005, 2011)
- Tomorrow's World (ABC 1959)
- Tonic (ABC 2011–2012)
- Towards 2000 (ABC 1981–1984)
- Triple Zero Heroes (Seven Network 2009)
- Unreal Estate (Nine Network 2016)
- Untold Stories (ABC 2014)
- What Really Happens in Bali (Seven Network 2014)
- What Really Happens in Thailand (Seven Network 2015)
- What Really Happens on the Gold Coast (Seven Network 2016)
- Where Are You Really From? (SBS 2018)
- Who The Bloody Hell Are We? (SBS 2023)
- Who's Been Sleeping in My House? (ABC 2011–2013)
- Why Is It So? (ABC 1963–1986)
- The World's Strictest Parents (Seven Network 2009–2012)
- You Saved My Life (Nine Network 2009)
- Young Doctors (Nine Network/9Gem 2011–2012)
- The Zoo (Seven Network 2008–2010)
- Zumbo (SBS 2011)

=== Game shows ===
- 1 vs. 100 (Nine Network 2007–2008)
- ADbc (SBS 2009–2010)
- All About Faces (Nine Network 1971)
- All Star Family Feud (Network Ten 2016–2018)
- All-Star Squares (Seven Network 1999)
- Almost Anything Goes (Network Ten 1976–1978)
- A*mazing (Seven Network 1994–1998)
- Ampol Stamp Quiz (Nine Network 1964–1965)
- Any Questions? (ABC 1950s)
- Are You Smarter than a 5th Grader? (Network Ten 2007–2009)
- Australia's Brainiest (Seven Network 2004, Network Ten 2005–2006)
- Australian Ninja Warrior (Nine Network 2017–2022)
- Balance Your Budget (TCN-9 1959–1960)
- Battle of the Sexes (Network Ten 1998)
- Beat the Odds (Seven Network 1971–1972)
- Behave Yourself! (Seven Network 2017)
- Bert's Family Feud (Nine Network 2006–2007)
- The Better Sex (Nine Network 1978)
- The Big Game (GTV-9 1966)
- The Big Music Quiz (Seven Network 2016)
- Big Nine (Nine Network 1969–1970)
- Big Square Eye (ABC 1991–1993)
- Binnie Time (GTV-9 1958–1959)
- Blankety Blanks (Network Ten 1977–1978, Nine Network 1985–1986, 1996)
- Blind Date (Network Ten 1967–1970, Seven Network 1974, Network Ten 1991, 2018)
- Blockbusters (Seven Network 1990–1994)
- Burgo's Catch Phrase (Nine Network 1997–2004)
- Buy Word (HSV-7 1962)
- Cannonball (Seven Network 2017)
- Cash Bonanza (Nine Network 2001)
- Cash Cab (Channel V 2007–2010)
- Casino 10 (Network Ten 1975–1977)
- Catch Us If You Can (Seven Network 1981)
- The Celebrity Game (Nine Network 1969, Network Ten 1976–1977)
- Celebrity Letters and Numbers (SBS 2021–2023)
- Celebrity Name Game (Network Ten 2019–2020)
- Celebrity Squares (Network Ten 1967, Nine Network 1975–1976)
- Celebrity Tattletales (Seven Network 1980)
- Clever (Nine Network 2006)
- Coles £3000 Question, Coles $6000 Question and The $7000 Question (Seven Network 1960–1971)
- The Con Test (Network Ten 2007)
- Concentration (Nine Network 1950s–1967, Seven Network 1970s, 1997)
- CRAM! (Network Ten 2017)
- Crossfire (Nine Network 1987–1988)
- The Cube Australia (Network Ten 2021)
- The Daryl and Ossie Show (Network Ten 1978)
- Deal or No Deal (Seven Melbourne 2003–2013)
- Dirty Laundry Live (ABC 2013–2015)
- Do You Trust Your Wife? (GTV-9 1957–1958)
- Dog Eat Dog (Seven Network 2002–2003)
- Don't Forget Your Toothbrush (Nine Network 1995)
- Double Dare (Network Ten 1989–1992)
- Double Your Dollars (Nine Network 1965)
- Download (Nine Network 2000–2002)
- The Dulux Show (Seven Network 1957)
- EC Plays Lift Off (ABC 1994)
- The Einstein Factor (ABC 2004–2009)
- Fairway Fun (Nine Network 1960s)
- Family Bowl Quiz (ABC 1969)
- Family Double Dare (Network Ten 1989)
- Family Feud (Nine Network 1977–1984, Seven Network 1988–1996, Network Ten 2014–2018, 2020)
- The Family Game (Network Ten 1967)
- Find the Link (ABC 1957–1958?)
- Flashback (ABC 1983, 2000)
- Flashez (ABC 1976–1977)
- Ford Superquiz (Nine Network 1981–1982)
- Free for All (Nine Network 1973)
- Friday Night Games (Network Ten 2006)
- Fun with Charades (HSV-7 1956–1958)
- Gambit (Nine Network 1974)
- Game of Games (Network Ten 2018)
- The Generation Game
- The Generation Gap (Network Ten 1969)
- Get the Message (Network Ten 1971–1972)
- Give it a Go (Seven Network 1957)
- Gladiators (Seven Network 1995–1997, 2008)
- Go Go Stop (Seven Network 2004–2009)
- The Golden Show (Nine Network 1960s)
- The Gong Show (Network Ten 1976)
- The Great Australian Spelling Bee (Network Ten 2015–2016)
- Great Temptation (Seven Network 1970–1976)
- The Great TV Game Show (Network Ten 1989)
- Greed (Network Ten 2001)
- Guess What? (Nine Network 1992–1993)
- Happy Go Lucky (TCN-9/HSV-7 1961)
- Have a Go (Seven Network 1987)
- Head 2 Head (ABC TV 2006)
- High Rollers (Seven Network 1975)
- Hole in the Wall (Nine Network 2008)
- Holey Moley (Seven Network 2021)
- Hot Streak (Seven Network 1998)
- I Do I Do (Network Ten 1996)
- Initial Reaction (Nine Network 2000)
- It Could Be You (Nine Network 1960–1967, 1969, 1982)
- It Pays to Be Funny (Seven Network 1957–1958)
- It's a Knockout (Network Ten 1985–1987, 2011–2012)
- I've Got a Secret (Network Ten 1966, 1968–1969)
- Jackpot (TCN 1960–1961)
- Jeopardy! (Network Ten 1970–1978, 1993)
- Jigsaw (Nine Network 1960s)
- Joker Poker (Network Ten 2005–2006)
- Ken and Jonathan (Seven Network 1964)
- Keynotes (Nine Network 1964, 1992–1993)
- The Krypton Factor (ABC 1987)
- Lady for a Day
- A League of Their Own (Network Ten 2013)
- Let's Make a Deal (Nine Network 1968–1969, 1977, Network Ten 1991)
- Letter Charades (Nine Network 1967)
- Letterbox and $50,000 Letterbox (Seven Network 1962, 1981)
- Letters and Numbers (SBS 2010–2012)
- Little Aussie Battlers (Nine Network 1998)
- Long Play (Network Ten 1977)
- The Love Game (Seven Network 1984)
- The Lucky Show (TCN-9 1959–1961)
- The Main Event (Seven Network 1991–1992)
- Man O Man (Seven Network 1994)
- The Marriage Game (Network Ten 1966–1972)
- The Master (Seven Network 2006)
- Match Game (Network Ten 1960s)
- Match Mates (Nine Network 1981–1982)
- Micro Macro (ABC 1978)
- Midnight Zoo (Seven Network 2006)
- Million Dollar Chance Of A Lifetime (Seven Network 1999–2000)
- Million Dollar Minute (Seven Network 2013–2015)
- Million Dollar Wheel of Fortune (Nine Network 2008)
- Millionaire Hot Seat (Nine Network 2009–2023)
- Mind Twist (Network Ten 1992–1993)
- The Mint (Nine Network 2007–2008)
- Minute to Win It (Seven Network 2010)
- Money Makers (Network Ten 1971–1973, 1982)
- My Fair Lady (HSV-7 1958–1962)
- My Generation (Nine Network 1995–1996)
- Name That Tune (TCN9 1956–1957, 1975)
- National Bingo Night (Seven Network 2007)
- National Star Quest (Regional TV 1978)
- The Newlywed Game (Network Ten 1968, Nine Network 1987)
- Now You See It (Seven Network 1985–1996, Nine Network 1998–1999)
- Off to the Races (ATV-0 1967–1969)
- Opportunity Knocks (Seven Network Sydney 1977–1978)
- Out of the Question (Seven Network 2008)
- The Oz Game (ABC 1988–1989)
- Party Time (Seven Network 1963)
- Pass the Buck (Nine Network 2002)
- Perfect Match (Network Ten 1978, 1984–1989, Seven Network 2002)
- Personality Squares (Network Ten 1967–1969, 1981)
- Pick a Box (Seven Network 1957–1971)
- Pick Your Face (Nine Network 1999–2003)
- Play Your Cards Right (Seven Network 1984)
- Play Your Hunch (Nine Network 1962–1964)
- Playcards (Network Ten 1969)
- Pointless (Network Ten 2018–2019)
- Pot Luck (Network Ten 1987)
- Pot Of Gold (Network Ten 1975–1978)
- Power of 10 (Nine Network 2008)
- Press Your Luck (Seven Network 1987–1988)
- The Pressure Pak Show (Seven Network 1957–1958)
- The Price Is Right (ATN7 1957–1959, GTV9 1958, Seven Network 1963, Network Ten 1973–1974, Seven Network 1981–1986, Network Ten 1989, Nine Network 1993–1998, 2003–2005, Seven Network 2012–2013)
- Pyramid (Nine Network 2009–2012, 9Go! 2013–2014)
- Pyramid Challenge (Network Ten 1978)
- Quest (ABC 1976–1978)
- A Question of Sport (Network Ten 1995–1996)
- The Quiz Kids (Seven Network 1964–1968)
- Quiz Master (Seven Network 2002)
- Quizmania (Nine Network 2006–2007)
- Race Around the World (ABC)
- Raising a Husband (1957–195?)
- Randling (ABC 2012)
- The Rich List (Seven Network 2007–2008)
- Ripsnorters (Seven Network 1997)
- RocKwiz (SBS 2005–2017)
- Sale of the Century (Nine Network 1980–2001)
- Say G'day (Nine Network 1987)
- Say When!! (Nine Network 1962–1964)
- Search for a Star (Network Ten 1970–1971, 1981)
- Second Chance (Network Ten 1977)
- Shafted (Nine Network 2002)
- Shaun Micallef's Brain Eisteddfod (Network 10 2022)
- Show Me the Money (Nine Network)
- Show Me the Movie! (Network Ten 2018–2019)
- Showcase (Network Ten 1965–1970, 1973–1974, 1978)
- The Singing Bee (Nine Network 2007–2010)
- Sleek Geeks (ABC 2008–2010)
- SlideShow (Seven Network 2013)
- Snakes and Ladders (HSV-7 1959)
- Spending Spree (Nine Network 1971–1976)
- Spicks and Specks (ABC 2005–2011, 2014)
- Split Personality (Network Ten 1967)
- Split Second (Nine Network 1972–1973)
- Sport in Question (ABC TV 1986)
- The Squiz (SBS 2009–2010)
- Star Search (Network Ten 1985–1986, 1991)
- Stop the Music (Seven Network 1950s)
- Strictly Dancing (ABC 2004–2005)
- Strike It Lucky (Nine Network 1994)
- Supermarket Sweep (Nine Network 1991–1994)
- Superquiz (Network Ten 1989)
- Surprise Package (Nine Network 1961)
- Surprise! Surprise! (Network Ten 1972)
- Take a Chance (Seven Network 1959)
- Take the Hint (Nine Network 1962–1966)
- Take A Letter (Network Ten 1967)
- Take Me Out (Seven Network 2018)
- Taken Out (Network Ten 2008)
- Talkin' 'Bout Your Generation (Network Ten 2009–2012, Nine Network 2018–2019)
- Talking Telephone Numbers (Seven Network 1996)
- Tell the Truth (Nine Network 1959–1965, Network Ten 1971–1972)
- Temptation (Nine Network 2005–2009)
- That's My Desire (HSV-7 1958–1960)
- Theatre Sports (ABC 1987)
- Think Tank (ABC 2018)
- Three on a Match (early 1970s)
- Tic-Tac-Dough (Nine Network 1960–1964)
- Time Masters (Seven Network 1996–1998)
- The Tommy Hanlon Show (Nine Network 1967–1968)
- Total Recall (Seven Network 1994–1995)
- Tractor Monkeys (ABC 2013)
- Treasure Hunt (Network Ten 1977–1978)
- The Trivial Video Show (Seven Network 1986)
- The Trophy Room (ABC 2010)
- TV Bingo (TCN-9 1965)
- TV Talent Scout (Seven Network 1957–1958)
- Ultimate Tag (Seven Network 2021)
- University Challenge (ABC 1987–1989)
- The Up-Late Game Show (Network Ten 2005–2006)
- Video Village (Seven Network 1962–1966)
- Vidiot (ABC 1992–1994)
- Visquiz (SBS 1985)
- The Weakest Link (Seven Network 2001–2002)
- Wedding Day (Seven Network 1956–1957)
- What Next (ABV-2 1958–1959)
- What's in the Picture (ABC 1958–1959)
- What's It Worth? (ABC 1950s)
- What's the Meaning? (HSV-7 1962)
- What's My Line (TCN-9 1956–1958)
- Wheel of Fortune (Nine Network 1959–1962, no relation to later series of the same name)
- Wheel of Fortune (Seven Network 1981–2006) (see also Million Dollar Wheel of Fortune)
- The White Room (Seven Network 2010)
- Who Dares Wins (Seven Network 1997–1998)
- Who Wants to Be a Millionaire? (Nine Network 1999–2007)
- Win Roy and HG's Money (Seven Network 2000)
- Wipeout (Seven Network 1999–2001)
- Wipeout Australia (Nine Network 2009)
- Would I Lie To You? Australia (Network 10 2022–2023)
- Would You Believe? (ABC 1970–1974)
- You May Be Right (Seven Network 2006)
- You're Back in the Room (Nine Network 2016)
- You're A Star (Network Ten 1982)

=== Lifestyle ===
- About Your Garden (HSV-7 1959–1960)
- Aerobics Oz Style (Network Ten 1982–2005)
- Anh Does... (Seven Network 2012–2015)
- At Home (RTS-5A, SES-8)
- At Home with David Jones (CTC-7 1963–1964)
- Auction Room (ABC 2012)
- Auction Squad (Seven Network 2001–2004)
- The Aussie Property Flippers (Seven Network 2017)
- Australia's Best Backyards (Seven Network 2007)
- Australia's Best Houses (7two 2013)
- Back in Time for Dinner (ABC 2018)
- Back in Time for the Corner Shop (ABC 2023–)
- Backyard Blitz (Nine Network 2000–2007)
- Barossa Gourmet with Justine Schofield (SBS Food 2023–)
- Beach House Escape (Nine Network 2022)
- Beauty Case (TCN-9 1958)
- Beauty is My Business (HSV-7 1957–1958)
- Behind the Sash (Network Ten 2019)
- Bright Ideas (Network Ten 1997–2005)
- Burke's Backyard (Nine Network 1987–2004)
- Buying Blind (Nine Network 2018)
- Can We Help? (ABC 2006–2011)
- Canberra Gardener (ABC 1964–1966)
- Changing Rooms (Nine Network 1995–2005, Network 10 2019)
- The Chef Presents (HSV-7 1957–1959)
- The Chocolate Queen (SBS Food 2023)
- Collectors (ABC 2005–2011)
- The Cook and the Chef (ABC 2006–2010)
- Cordon Bleu Kitchen (ATN-7 1960)
- Costa's Garden Odyssey (SBS 2009–2011)
- Counterpoints (TCN-9 1958)
- Country Home Rescue (reality Nine Network 2022–)
- Coxy's Big Break (Seven Network 2004–2015)
- The Critics (ABC 1959–1960)
- Cross Country (Prime7, GWN7, Seven Queensland, Southern Cross GTS/BKN, SES8, RTS5A, GWN7, Imparja Television, Southern Cross Tasmania, 1989–1999)
- Cruise Mode (Network Ten 2016–2017)
- Deadline Design with Shaynna Blaze (Lifestyle Home 2016–)
- Dirty Jobs (Nine Network 2007)
- Discover Downunder (Nine Network 2010–2014)
- Discover Tasmania (Southern Cross Tasmania 2007)
- DIY Rescue (Nine Network 2003)
- Do It (Nine Network 2006–2010)
- Domestic Blitz (Nine Network 2008–2010)
- Dream Listing (reality Nine Network 2023–)
- Duncan's Thai Kitchen (9Gem 2014)
- Everyday Health (Network Ten 2016)
- Fashion Digest (ATN-7/GTV-9 1960–1961)
- Food 4 Life (Seven Network 2007, 4ME 2013–)
- Food Lovers' Guide to Australia (SBS 1996–2006)
- Food Safari (SBS 2006–2018)
- Fresh (Nine Network 2000–2009)
- Fun With Food (Nine Network 1960–1971)
- Gourmet Farmer (SBS 2010)
- The Great Australian Cookbook (Lifestyle Food 2017)
- The Great Day Out (Seven Network Queensland 2017–2020)
- The Great Outdoors (Seven Network 1992–2009, 2012)
- The Great South East (Seven Network Queensland 2001–2016)
- Green Fingers (HSV-7 1957–1959)
- Ground Force (Seven Network 1999–2004)
- Handyman (HSV-7 1957–1958)
- Harry's Practice (Seven Network 1997–2003)
- Home Cooked! With Julie Goodwin (Nine Network 2010)
- The Home Show (TCN-9 1956–1957)
- Hot Property (Seven Network 1999–2010, Nine Network 2010–2013)
- The House and Garden Show (TCN-9 1958)
- House Calls to the Rescue (Seven Network)
- Huey's Cooking Adventures (Seven Network 1997, Network Ten 1998–2010)
- Huey's Kitchen (Network Ten 2010–2014)
- Is Your House Killing You? (SBS 2007)
- It's a Lifestyle TV (Network Ten 2013)
- The Jean Bowring Show (HSV-7 1957–1960)
- Just Add Water WA (Nine Network 1996–2011)
- Keeping Company (GTV-9 1958–1959)
- Khanh Ong's Wild Food (SBS Food 2023)
- Let's Dance (HSV-7 1957)
- Let's Do It (Network Ten)
- Let's Make Clothes (1959)
- Level 23 (Network Ten 1994)
- Level 3 (Channel 31 2005–2012)
- Location Location Location Australia (Lifestyle Channel 2012–2014, Network 10 2023)
- Lonely Planet Six Degrees (SBS)
- Lovely to Look At (GTV-9 1957)
- Luke Nguyen’s Indian Insights (SBS Food 2023)
- Luke Nguyen's Vietnam (SBS 2010–2011)
- Lyndey and Blair's Taste of Greece (SBS 2011)
- Mainly for Women (ABC 1961–1964)
- Mannequin Parade (GTV-9 1957–1958)
- Melbourne Weekender (Seven Network Melbourne 2006–2016)
- Menus for Moderns (ATN-7 1960–1961)
- Mercurio's Menu (Seven Network 2008–2011)
- A Moveable Feast (Seven Network 2015–2017)
- My Family Feast (SBS 2009–2010)
- My Home (Nine Network 2007)
- The N.R.M.A Show (TCN-9 1957)
- The New Inventors (ABC 2004–2011)
- Open Homes Australia (Nine Network 2020–)
- Our House (Nine Network 1993–2001)
- Our Place (Nine Network 2005)
- The Outdoor Room (Seven Network 2008)
- Paradise Kitchen Bali with Lauren Camilleri (SBS Food 2023)
- Personal Column (HSV-7 1958–1959)
- Personal Touch (Network Ten 1966)
- Poh & Co. (ABC 2013–2016)
- Poh's Kitchen (ABC 2010–2012)
- Postcards (Nine Network 1995–2008, WIN Television/Nine Network 2008–2011)
- Queensland Weekender (Seven Network Queensland 2003–2020)
- Ralph TV (Nine Network 2007)
- Ready Steady Cook (Network Ten 2005–2013)
- Renovation Rescue (Nine Network 2006)
- Room for Improvement (Seven Network 2000–2003)
- SA Life (Seven Network South Australia 2012–2017)
- SA Weekender (Seven Network South Australia 2017–2020)
- Second Opinion (ABC 2005)
- Sow What (ABC 1967–1988)
- Surfing the Menu (ABC 2003–2006)
- Surfing the Menu: The Next Generation (ABC 2016)
- Surprise Chef (Seven Network 2001–2003)
- Sydney Weekender (Seven Network Sydney 1994–2020)
- Teenage Boss (ABC 2019–2020)
- Televisit (TVW-7 1960–1965)
- Three Blue Ducks (Network Ten 2021)
- Things To Try Before You Die (Nine Network 2007)
- Travelcade (TEN Queensland, Prime and QSTV 1990–1996)
- TV Kitchen (Nine Network 1971–1976)
- WA Weekender (Seven Network Western Australia 2014–2017)
- What's On (HSV-7 1959)
- Woman's World (SES-8)
- Women's World (ABC 1957–1963)
- The World of Glamour (TCN-9 1964–1965)
- Your Home (ATN-7 1956–1964)
- Your Life on the Lawn (Seven Network 2003)
- You've Got the Job (Seven Network 2006)
- The Zone (Nine Network 1994–1995)

=== Music ===
- Countdown (ABC 1974–1987)
- The Loop (10 Peach 2012–2020)
- Music Express (SES-8 Mt. Gambier)
- SBS PopAsia (SBS ONE 2011–2013, SBS2 2013–2016, SBS 2 2016–2018)
- The Set (ABC 2018–2019)
- The Sound (ABC 2020–2022)

=== News and current affairs ===
- #TalkAboutIt (Australia Plus TV 2011–2016)
- 9StreamLIVE (Nine Network 2013)
- 11AM (Seven Network 1982–1999)
- 6.30 with George Negus (Network Ten 2011)
- 7 Days (ABC 2001–2005)
- The 7.30 Report (ABC 1986–2011)
- ABC Fora (ABC 2008–2009)
- Alan Jones Live (Network Ten 1994)
- Asia Pacific Focus (ABC 2001–2014)
- Australia Wide (ABC 2005–2008)
- Breakfast (Network Ten 2012)
- Business Breakfast (ABC 2002–2003)
- Business Sunday (Nine Network 1986–2006)
- Business Today (Australia Plus TV 2006–2014)
- Capital Hill (ABC News 24 2010–2015)
- The Daily Edition (Seven Network 2013—2020)
- The Dalley Edition (Sky News 2014–2016)
- Difference of Opinion (ABC 2007)
- The Drum (ABC 2012–2023, ABC News 2010–2023)
- Entertainment Tonight Australia (Nine Network 1999)
- Eric Baume's Viewpoint (TCN-9 1959–1961)
- Extra (Nine Network Brisbane 1992–2009)
- Face to Face (Seven Network 1995–1997)
- FAQ (ABC 1999–2000)
- Feedback (ABC 2002–2004)
- Financial Review Sunday (Nine Network 2013–2015)
- focus (NQTV 1979–)
- George Negus Tonight (ABC 2001–2004)
- Good Morning Australia (Network Ten 1981–1992)
- Good Morning Delhi (Network Ten, One 2010)
- Hadley! (Sky News Australia 2010)
- Hemispheres (co-produced with the CBC in Canada)
- Hinch (Seven Network 1987–1991, Network Ten 1992–1994)
- Hinch Live (Sky News Live 2015–2016, 2019)
- Hotline (SBS 1990–2007)
- Hungry Beast (ABC 2009–2011)
- Inside Business (ABC 2002–2013)
- Karvelas (Sky News Live 2016–2017)
- Lateline (ABC 1990–2017)
- Lateline Business (ABC 2006–2010)
- The Latest with Laura Jayes (Sky News Live 2016–2017)
- Mandarin News Australia (SBS 2010–2012)
- Meet the Press (Seven Network 1958–1967, Network Ten 1992–2013)
- Missing Persons Unit (Nine Network 2006–2009)
- News Magazine (HSV-7 1958–1960)
- Newsline with Jim Middleton (Australia Plus TV 2008–2014)
- Newsweek (NQTV 1978–1989)
- Nightline (Nine Network 1988–2008)
- Nine News at 7 (9Gem 2013)
- Nine News Now (Nine Network 2013–2019)
- The Observer Effect (SBS ONE 2013)
- PVO NewsDay (Sky News Live 2015–2017)
- Pyne & Marles (Sky News 2016–2018)
- The Quarters (ABC News 24 2010–2015)
- Quantum (ABC 1985–2001)
- Real Life (Seven Network 1992–1994)
- Revealed (Network Ten 2013)
- Richo (Sky News 2011–2016)
- Seven News at 7 (7two 2013–2014)
- Speers Tonight (Sky News Live 2016–2017)
- State to State (ABC 2010–2015)
- Stateline (ABC 1996–2010)
- Sunday (Nine Network 1981–2008)
- Sunday Night (Seven Network 2009–2019)
- Ten Eyewitness News Early (Network Ten 2013–2014)
- Ten Eyewitness News Late (Network Ten 2012–2014)
- Ten Eyewitness News Morning (Network Ten 2013–2014)
- Terry Willesee Tonight (Seven Network 1984–1988)
- This Afternoon (Nine Network 2009)
- This Day Tonight (ABC 1967–1978)
- This I Believe (ATN-7 1956–1958)
- This is Television (TCN-9 1956)
- The Times (Seven Network 1994–1995)
- To the Point (Sky News Live 2015–2017)
- Today (GTV-9 1960–1961, no relation to later program of the same name)
- Today Tonight (Seven Network 1995–2014, Seven Adelaide and Seven Perth 2014–2019)
- The Truth Is (Network Ten 2013)
- Viewpoint (Sky News 2003–2004, 2012–2016)
- Wake Up (Network Ten 2013–2014)
- Wanted (Network Ten 2013)
- Willesee (Seven Network 1975–1982, Nine Network 1984–1988)
- Witness (Seven 1990s)

=== Reality ===
- The $20 Challenge (Network 10 2000)
- 10 Years Younger in 10 Days (Seven Network 2009)
- All Together Now (Seven Network 2018. Not to be confused with the comedy series of the same name that ran on Channel Nine from 1991 to 1994)
- The Apprentice Australia (Nine Network 2009)
- Aussie BBQ Heroes (Seven Network 2015)
- Aussie Pickers (A&E Australia 2013–2014)
- Aussie Queer Eye for the Straight Guy (Network 10 2005)
- Australia's Cheapest Weddings (Seven Network 2016)
- Australia's Next Top Model (FOX8 2005–2016)
- Australia's Perfect Couple (Nine Network 2009)
- Australian Spartan (Seven Network 2018, 7mate 2019)
- Bachelor in Paradise Australia (Network 10 2018–2020)
- The Bachelorette Australia (Network 10 2015–2021)
- Back with the Ex (Seven Network 2018)
- The Band (Network 10)
- Battle of the Choirs (Seven Network 2008)
- Beauty and the Geek Australia (Seven Network 2009–2014)
- Being Lara Bingle (Network 10 2012)
- The Big Adventure (Seven Network 2014)
- Big Brother (Network 10 2001–2008, Nine Network 2012–2014)
- The Biggest Loser (Network 10 2006–2017)
- Blow Up (Seven Network 2023)
- Bride & Prejudice (Seven Network 2017–2019)
- The Briefcase (Nine Network 2016)
- Bringing Sexy Back (Seven Network 2014)
- Brynne: My Bedazzled Life (Seven Network 2012)
- The Celebrity Apprentice Australia (Nine Network 2011–2015)
- Celebrity Big Brother (Network 10 2002)
- Celebrity Come Dine With Me Australia (Lifestyle Food 2012–2014)
- Celebrity Dog School (Network 10 2007)
- Celebrity MasterChef Australia (Network 10 2009)
- Celebrity Overhaul (Nine Network 2005–2006)
- Celebrity Splash! (Seven Network 2013)
- Celebrity Survivor (Seven Network 2006)
- The Chefs' Line (SBS 2017–2019)
- Child Genius (SBS 2018)
- The Chopping Block (Nine Network 2008–2009)
- The Colony (SBS 2005)
- Come Date with Me (10 Peach 2013–2014)
- Come Dine with Me Australia (Lifestyle Food 2011–2015)
- Cricket Superstar (FOX8 2012)
- Dance Boss (Seven Network 2018)
- Dancing with the Stars (Seven Network 2004–2015, Network 10 2019–2020)
- Date Night (Nine Network 2018)
- Dating in the Dark Australia (FOX8 2010–2012)
- Demolition Man (A&E Australia 2017)
- Dinner Date (Seven Network 2011)
- Don't Tell the Bride (Network 10 2012)
- Dreamhome (Nine Network 2000)
- Eco House Challenge (SBS 2007)
- Everybody Dance Now (Network 10 2012)
- Excess Baggage (Nine Network/9Go! 2012)
- The Family (SBS 2011–2012)
- Family Food Fight (Nine Network 2017–2018)
- First Dates (Seven Network 2016–2020)
- Football Superstar (FOX8 2008–2011)
- Formal Wars (Seven Network 2013)
- Four Weddings (Seven Network 2010)
- Freshwater Blue (MTV Australia 2011)
- The Fugitive (Network 10)
- Girlband (Network Ten 2006)
- Good Game (ABC TV Plus 2006–2006)
- Gus Worland: Marathon Man (A&E Australia 2014–)
- Hell's Kitchen Australia (Seven Network 2017)
- homeMADE (Nine Network 2009)
- The Hot House (Network Ten 2004)
- The Hot Plate (Nine Network 2015)
- House From Hell (Network Ten 1998)
- House Rules (Seven Network 2013–2020)
- I Do I Do (Network 10)
- I Will Survive (Network 10 2012)
- Instant Hotel (Seven Network 2017–2019)
- Iron Chef Australia (Seven Network 2010)
- It Takes Two (Seven Network 2006–2009)
- Junior MasterChef Australia (Network 10 2010–2011)
- Kiss Bang Love (Seven Network 2016)
- Last Chance Learners (Seven Network 2007)
- The Last Resort (Nine Network 2017)
- Let's Do Coffee (Network Ten 2015–2016)
- The Lost Tribes (Nine Network 2007)
- Love Island Australia (9Go!/Nine Network 2018–2019)
- Make Me a Supermodel (Seven Network 2008)
- Making It Australia (Network 10 2021)
- The Masked Singer (Network 10 2019—2023)
- MasterChef Australia All-Stars (Network 10 2012)
- MasterChef Australia: The Professionals (Network 10 2013)
- Meet the Hockers (9Go! 2017)
- The Mentor (Seven Network 2018)
- Million Dollar Island (Seven Network 2023)
- The Mole (Seven Network 2000–2003, 2005, 2013)
- My Kid's a Star (Nine Network 2008)
- My Kitchen Rules (Seven Network 2010–2020)
- My Restaurant Rules (Seven Network 2004–2005)
- Neighbours at War (Nine Network 2007)
- Nerds FC (SBS 2006–2007)
- The NRL Rookie (9Go! 2016)
- Outback House (ABC 2005)
- Outback Jack (Nine Network 2004–2005)
- Pawn Stars Australia (A&E Australia 2015–)
- Photo Number 6 (Network 10 2018)
- Planet Cake (Lifestyle Food 2011)
- Playing It Straight (Seven Network 2004)
- Please Marry My Boy (Seven Network 2012–2013)
- Pooch Perfect (Seven Network reality 2020)
- Popstars (Seven Network 2000–2002)
- Popstars Live (Seven Network 2004)
- Project Runway Australia (Arena 2008–2012)
- The Proposal (Seven Network 2019)
- Queer Eye for the Straight Guy (Network 10 2005)
- The Real Dirty Dancing (Seven Network 2019)
- The Real Housewives of Melbourne (Arena 2014–2021)
- The Real Housewives of Sydney (Arena 2017)
- Recipe to Riches (Network 10 2013–2014)
- The Recruit (FOX8 2014)
- Reno Rumble (Nine Network 2015–2016)
- The Renovators (Network 10 2011)
- The Repair Shop Australia (Lifestyle Australia 2023)
- The Resort (Network 10 2004)
- Restaurant Revolution (Seven Network 2015)
- Rush (Nine Network 2023)
- Say Yes to the Dress: Australia (Arena 2016)
- Search for a Supermodel (Network 10 2000–2002)
- Seven Year Switch (Seven Network 2016–2017)
- Shark Tank (Network 10 2015–2018)
- The Shire (Network 1 2012)
- Silvia's Italian Table (ABC 2016)
- The Single Wives (Seven Network 2018)
- So You Think You Can Dance Australia (Network 10 2008–2010, 2014)
- The Stafford Brothers (FOX8 2011–2012)
- StarStruck (Nine Network 2000)
- StarStruck (Nine Network 2005)
- The Steph Show (Network 10 2006)
- The Super Switch (Seven Network 2019)
- Sylvania Waters (ABC 1992)
- Teen Fit Camp (Network Ten 2007)
- Teen Mom Australia (MTV 2019, 10 Shake 2020)
- This Time Next Year (Nine Network 2017–2019)
- Top Design Australia (Nine Network 2011)
- Top Gear Australia (SBS 2008–2010, Nine Network 2010–2011)
- Torvill and Dean's Dancing on Ice (Nine Network 2006)
- Treasure Island (Seven Network 2000)
- Trial By Kyle (Network 10 2019)
- Undercover Boss Australia (Network 10 2010)
- The Voice Kids (Nine Network 2014)
- WAG Nation (Arena 2012)
- When Love Comes to Town (Nine Network 2014)
- The X Factor (Network Ten 2005, Seven Network 2010–2016)
- Yasmin's Getting Married (Network 10 2006)
- Young Talent Time (Network 10 1971–1988, 2012)
- Yummy Mummies (Seven Network 2017–2019)
- Zumbo's Just Desserts (Seven Network 2016–2019)

=== Soap operas ===
- Arcade (Network 10 1980)
- Autumn Affair (ATN-7/GTV-9 1958–1959)
- Bellbird (ABC 1967–1977)
- The Box (Network 10 1974–1977)
- Breakers (Network 10 1997–1999)
- Carson's Law (Network 10 1983–1984)
- Certain Women (ABC 1973–1976)
- Chances (Nine Network 1991–1992)
- Class of 74 (Seven Network 1974–1975)
- Cop Shop (Seven Network 1977–1984)
- Counter Play (9Go! 2018–2019)
- A Country Practice (Seven Network 1981–1993, Network 10 1994)
- Crash Palace (FOX8 2001–2001)
- E Street (Network 10 1989–1993)
- Echo Point (Network 10 1995)
- Family and Friends (Nine Network 1990)
- Glenview High (Seven Network 1977–1978)
- Heartbreak High (Network 10 1993–1996, ABC 1997–1999)
- The Heights (ABC 2019–2021)
- Holiday Island (Network 10 1981)
- Hotel Story (Network 10 1977)
- Kings (Nine Network 1984)
- Lane End (ABC 1972)
- Motel (TV series) (Seven Network 1968)
- Neighbours (Seven Network 1985, Network 10 1986–2010, 2023–2025, 10 Peach 2011–2022, 10/Amazon Prime Video 2023–2025)
- Number 96 (Network 10 1972–1977)
- Out of the Blue (Network 10 2008–2010)
- Pacific Drive (Nine Network 1995)
- Paradise Beach (Nine Network 1993–1994)
- Possession (Nine Network 1985)
- The Power, The Passion (Seven Network 1989)
- Prime Time (Nine Network 1986–1987)
- Prisoner (Network 10 1979–1986)
- Punishment (Network 10 1981)
- The Restless Years (Network 10 1977–1981)
- Return to Eden (Network 10 1986)
- Richmond Hill (Network 10 1988)
- Shark Bay (Foxtel 1996)
- Skyways (Seven Network 1979–1981)
- Something in the Air (ABC 2000–2002)
- Sons and Daughters (Seven Network 1981–1987)
- Starting Out (Nine Network 1983)
- The Story of Peter Grey (Seven Network 1961–1962)
- The Sullivans (Nine Network 1976–1983)
- Taurus Rising (Nine Network 1983)
- The Unisexers (Nine Network 1975)
- Until Tomorrow (Seven Network 1975)
- Waterloo Station (Nine Network 1983)
- You Can't See 'Round Corners 1963
- The Young Doctors (Nine Network 1976–1983)

=== Special events ===
- 50 Years 50 Shows (Nine Network 2005–2006)
- 50 Years 50 Stars (Nine Network 2006)
- 50 Years Young (Network 10 2014)
- Australia Unites: Reach Out To Asia (Seven Network/Nine Network/Network Ten)
- Countdown to 3 (ABC 2009)
- Deadly Awards (SBS 1995–2013)
- Diva Awards (Fox8 2003)
- Lights, Camera, Party!: Television City Celebrates (Nine Network 2010)
- My Favourite Album (ABC 2006)
- My Favourite Australian (ABC 2008)
- My Favourite Book (ABC 2004)
- My Favourite Film (ABC 2005)
- Nickelodeon Australian Kids' Choice Awards (Nickelodeon 2003–2011)
- Oz Concert (SBS)
- Seriously 40 (Network Ten 2005)
- SlimeFest (Nickelodeon 2012–2016)
- TV Turns 50 (Seven Network 2006)

=== Sport ===
- Any Given Sunday (AFL) (Nine Network 2005–2006)
- Australian Premier League Football Show (Aurora Community Channel)
- Before the Game (AFL) (Network 10 2003–2013) (as After the Game in 2003)
- Beyond the Boundary (AFL) (Network 10)
- Boots N' All (NRL) (Fox Sports/Nine Network)
- The Bounce (AFL) (Seven Network 2010)
- Contact Sport (ABC News 24 2010–2012)
- Double Dribble (ABC TV Plus 2014)
- The Dream in Athens with Roy & HG (Seven Network August 2004) (Athens Greece Summer Olympics)
- The Dream with Roy & HG (Seven Network September–October 2000) (Sydney 2000 Summer Olympics)
- Eric Welch's Sports Album (GTV-9 1957)
- The Fat (moved to the Seven Network from ABC and became 110% Tony Squires in 2004)
- Football Inquest (1957 series on GTV-9 and a 1960–1974 series on HSV-7)
- Football Survey (GTV-9 1957)
- The Footy Show (HSV-7 1957–1958)
- The Footy Show (AFL) (Nine Network 1994–2019)
- The Footy Show (rugby league) (Nine Network 1994–2018)
- The Full Brazilian (SBS ONE 2014)
- The Game Plan (AFL) (10 Bold 2011–2012)
- The Game Plan (NRL) (10 Bold 2011–2013, Network 10 2012)
- The Ice Dream With Roy & HG (Seven Network February 2002) (Salt Lake City USA Winter Olympics)
- In Conversation with Alex Malley (Nine Network 2016–2018)
- Inside Edge (ABC News 2012)
- John Coleman on Football (HSV-7 1957)
- Junior Sports Magazine (ABC 1962–1965)
- League Teams (HSV-7 1960s & 1970s)
- Live and Kicking (Seven Network 1998–1999)
- Live and Sweaty (ABC 1991–1995)
- The Marngrook Footy Show (NITV 2007–2019, ABC TV Plus 2011–2012)
- Olympics on Nine (Nine Network/9Gem 1956, 1976, 1992, 1994, 2010, 2012)
- Olympics on Seven (Seven Network 1992, 1996, 2000, 2004, 2008, 2016, 2020)
- Olympics on Ten (Network 10/10 Bold 1984, 1988, 2014)
- One Week at a Time (AFL) (10 Bold 2009–2011)
- One Week at a Time (NRL) (10 Bold 2011)
- Ra (FOX8 2005)
- RPM (Network 10 1997–2008, 2015–2020, One 2011)
- Sam and The Fatman (Nine Network 2000)
- Santo, Sam and Ed's Total Football (2013–2015) on Fox Sports (Australia)
- Saturday Sports Round-Up (GTV-9 1957)
- Sideliners (ABC 2017)
- Sports Parade (GTV-9 1957)
- Sports Talk (HSV-7 1956–1959)
- Sports Tonight (Network 10 1993–2009, Network 10/10 Bold 2009–2012, Network 10 2018–2019)
- SportsFan Clubhouse (7mate 2013–2015)
- Sportsline (Sky News 1996–2014)
- SportsNight with James Bracey (Sky News Live 2013–2016)
- Sportsworld (Seven Network 1990–2006)
- Surf and Snow (Network 10, 10 Bold 2014)
- Talking Footy (1995–2004)
- Teams on 10 (2020–2021)
- Thursday FC (SBS 2 2013–2014)
- Thursday Night Live (all) (10 Bold 2009–2010)
- The Thursday Night Sport Show (10 Bold 2014)
- Toyota World Sport (SBS 2005–2006)
- V8Xtra (Seven Network 2007–2014)
- The Western Front (Network 10 2002–2011)
- World of Sport (Seven Network 1957–1987)

=== Talk and variety ===
- 9am with David & Kim (Network 10 2006–2009)
- Access 1974 (ABC 1974)
- Adam Hills Tonight (ABC 2011–2013)
- Agony Aunts (ABC 2012)
- The Agony of... (ABC 2012–2015)
- The Agony of Christmas (ABC 2013)
- The Agony of Life (ABC 2013)
- Agony Uncles (ABC 2012)
- Andrew Denton's Interview (Seven Network 2018–2019)
- The Annette Klooger Show (ABC 1959–1961)
- Anything Goes (GTV-9 1957)
- Astor Showcase (ATN-7 1957–1959)
- At Seven on 7 (ATN-7 1956–1957)
- Auditions (HSV-7 1962)
- Australia Versus (Seven Network 2010)
- Australia's Amateur Hour (TCN-9/HSV-7 1957–1958)
- Bandwagon (HSV-7 1959–1960)
- Be My Guest (HSV-7 1957)
- Beauty and the Beast (Seven Network 1964–1973; 1982, Network Ten 1982–1983; 1996–2002, Foxtel 1996–2002; 2005–2007)
- The Beer Factor (9Go! 2012)
- Beginners, Please (ABC 1961)
- Bentley's Bandbox (ABC 1960)
- Between Ourselves (ABC 1963)
- The Big Breakfast (Network 10 1992–1995)
- The Big Schmooze (Comedy Channel 2000–2001)
- The Bobby Limb Show (Nine Network, 1959–1961, then became The Mobil-Limb Show)
- Boomerang (GTV-9 1961–1962)
- The Bottom Line (Nine Network 2013–2014)
- BP Super Show (circa 1959 to circa 1970)
- Brenda's Time (HSV-7 1959)
- The Burning Question (ATN-7 1957–1960)
- Cafe Continental (ABC 1958–1961)
- Can of Worms (Network 1 2011–2013)
- Canberra Report (ATN-7 1959–1960)
- Canberra Week (ABC 1963–1965)
- The Catch-Up (Nine Network 2007)
- Chris & Julia's Sunday Night Takeaway (Network 10 2019)
- The Circle (Network 10 2010–2012)
- Clarke and Dawe (ABC 2013–2017)
- Club Seven (HSV-7 1959–1961)
- Coast to Coast (Nine Network 1987–1989)
- Comment (ATN-7 1958–1960)
- Common Sense (Lifestyle/Network 10 2017)
- The Contact Show (TCN-9 1960)
- Couch Time (10 Peach 2011–2017)
- Curtain Call (ATN-7 1960)
- The Daily Edition (Seven Network 2013–2020)
- Daly at Night (HSV-7 1962–1963)
- The Danny Dean Show (ATN-7 1959–1960)
- David Tench Tonight (Network 10 2006)
- The Delo and Daly Show (Seven Network 1963–1964)
- Denise (Seven Network 1998–2001)
- Dita (Network 10 1967–1970)
- The Don Lane Show (Nine Network 1975–1983)
- Elders with Andrew Denton (ABC 2008–2009)
- Enough Rope with Andrew Denton (ABC 2003–2008)
- Eric and Mary (HSV-7 1956)
- The Eric Bana Show Live (1997)
- An Evening With (CTC-7 1966–1967)
- The Evie Hayes Show (ABV-2 1960)
- Fiesta (ABC 1958)
- First Appearances (ABC 1962)
- Floorshow (ABC 1963)
- Gaslight Music Hall (ABC/TCN-9 1959–1960)
- The George Wallace Show (TCN-9 1960)
- The Glass House (ABC 2001–2006)
- The Golden Show (Seven Network 1964)
- Good Morning Australia with Bert Newton (Network 10 1993–2005), formerly known as The Morning Show (Network 10 1992)
- Good Morning Delhi (Network 10/10 Bold 2010)
- Greeks on the Roof (Seven Network 2003)
- Guest of the Week (HSV-7 1956–1957)
- Hal Lashwood's Alabama Jubilee (ABC 1958–1961)
- The Happy Go Lucky Show (GTV-9 1957–1959)
- Here Come the Girls (ABC 1960)
- Hey Hey It's Saturday (Nine Network 1971–1999, 2009–2010)
- His and Hers (Network 10, 1971–1972)
- Hold Everything (HSV-7 1961)
- Homeward Bound (ABV-2 1958)
- House Party (HSV-7 1959–1960)
- In Brisbane Today (Nine Network Queensland 1990–1992, hosted by Fiona McDonald)
- In Melbourne Today (GTV-9 1957–1958)
- In Melbourne Tonight (Nine Network 1957–1970 and became The Graham Kennedy Show from 1972–1975, Nine Network 1996–1998)
- The Isador Goodman Show – (HSV-7 1956–1957)
- The Jimmy Wheeler Show (ABC 1960)
- Joe Martin's Late Show (TCN 1959)
- The Johnny Gredula Show (ABC 1957–1958)
- The Johnny O'Connor Show (TCN-9 1956)
- Just Barbara (ABV-2 1961)
- Katrina (ATV-0/ATV-10, 1967)
- The Ken Noyle Show (ABC 1958)
- Kerri-Anne (Nine Network 2002–2011)
- The Late Show (HSV-7 1957–1959)
- Latin Holiday (ABC 1961)
- Leave it to the Girls (GTV-9 1957)
- Like You to Meet (HSV-7 1959)
- Little Big Shots (2017–2019)
- Live on Bowen (C31 Melbourne 2012–2015)
- Make Mine Music (Seven Network 1962)
- Malcolm Muggeridge Meets Australians (Nine Network 1958)
- Meet (ABC 1957)
- Meet James Mossman (ATN-7 1957–1958)
- Meet Me at Bebarfalds (TCN-9 1958–1959)
- Men at the Top (ABC 1959)
- Merry-Go-Round (HSV-7 1961)
- Micallef Tonight (with Shaun Micallef 2003)
- The Midday Show (Nine Network 1985–1998)
- The Mike Walsh Show (Network 10 1973–1977, Nine Network 1977–1984 then became The Midday Show from 1985–1998)
- Mouthing Off (The Comedy Channel)
- Music and Dance (ABV-2 1959)
- New Faces (Nine Network 1963–1985, 1989–1990, Network Ten 1991–1993)
- The NightCap (Seven Network/7HD 2008)
- Noel and Mary (ATV-0 1967)
- Off the Peg (ABC 1965)
- Old-Time Ballroom (ABC 1959–1960)
- O'Loghlin on Saturday Night (ABC 1999)
- On Camera (ATN-7 1959–1960)
- On the Couch with Wippa (10 Peach 2013)
- On the Spot (GTV-9 1959–1960)
- Open Hearing (ABC 1960–1961)
- Open House (GTV-9 1957–1958)
- Oxford Show (HSV-7 1957–1958)
- The Panel (Network 10 1998–2004)
- Penthouse (ATN-7 1960–1961)
- Person to Person (ATN-7 1959–1960)
- Personal Album (GTV-9 1958–1959)
- Personal Column (HSV-7 1958–1959)
- Personally Yours (ABC 1962)
- Pictures of You (Seven Network 2012)
- Reality Check (ABC 2014–2015)
- The Red Moore Show (ABC 1962)
- Rendezvous at Romano's (TCN-9 1957)
- Rooftop Rendezvous (ABC 1959)
- Room for Two (ATN-7 1958–1959)
- Roundabout (ATV-0 1967–1971)
- Rove (Nine Network 1999, Network 10 2000–2009)
- Rove LA (FOX8 2011–2012)
- Salam Cafe (Channel 31 2005–2008, SBS 2008)
- Santo, Sam and Ed's Sports Fever! (Seven Network/7mate 2012)
- Saturday Night Rove (Network 10 2019)
- Saturday Party (ABV-2 1959)
- The Saturday Show (ABV-2, 1959)
- Saturday Showcase (HSV-7 1960)
- Say It with Music (TCN-9 1957–1958)
- Say It with Music (Network 10 1967–1969)
- Screen Time (ABC 2017)
- Seeing Stars (ABC, 1957–1959)
- The Shirley Abicair Show (ATN-7/GTV-9, 1958)
- Shower of Stars (ATN-7 1959)
- Showtime (ABC 1959–1960)
- The Sideshow (ABC 2007)
- The Simon Gallaher Show (ABC 1982–1983)
- The Spearman Experiment (Network 10 2009)
- Stairway to the Stars (HSV-7 1956–1958)
- Startime (Seven Network 1962–1963)
- State Your Case (ATN-7 1957)
- The Steph Show (Network 10 2006)
- Stop Laughing...This Is Serious (ABC 2015–2017)
- Studio A (Seven Network 1963–1964)
- Studio A (C312008–2011)
- Studio 10 (Network 10 2013–2023)
- Susie (WIN Television 2007–2009)
- Swallow's Juniors (HSV-7 1957–1970, later retitled Brian and the Juniors)
- Sydney Tonight (ATN-7 1956–1959)
- Take it Easy (GTV-9 1959–1960)
- Take Three (ABC 1961–1962)
- Talking Heads (ABC 2005–2010)
- Tele-Variety (ABC 1957–1958)
- Theatre Royal (BTQ-7 1961–1968)
- The Project (Network 10 2009–2025), previously The 7PM Project
- This Week Live (Network Ten 2013)
- Thursday at One (1957–1960 GTV-9)
- Tivoli Party Time (HSV-7 1957)
- Toddy Time (GTV 1961)
- Tonight in Canberra (CTC-7 1968)
- Tonight Live with Steve Vizard (Seven Network 1990–1993)
- The Toppanos (ATN-7 1958–1959)
- Town Talk (TCN-9 1957)
- TV Channell (ABC 1956–1957)
- TV Follies (ABC 1979)
- TV Showboat (ABC 1960)
- TV Talent Scout (ATN-7 1957–1958)
- Two's Company (ABV-2 1959–1961)
- Under Melbourne Tonight (C31 1993–1997)
- Under Melbourne Tonight Presents...... What's Goin' On There? (C31 1998)
- Variety 7 (HSV-7 1963–1964)
- Variety View (ABV-2 1958–1959)
- Vikki (ABC 1963)
- Western Holiday (HSV-7 1960)
- Where Are They Now? (Seven Network 2006–2007)
- Whovians (ABC TV Plus 2017–2019)
- Women at the Top (ABC 1959)
- Wonderful World (HSV-7 1959–1960)

== See also ==
- List of Australian television news services
- List of live television plays broadcast on ABC (1950–1969)
- List of longest-running Australian television series
- List of longest-running UK television series
- List of New Zealand television series
- Lists of Canadian television series
