= Jarjums =

- Genre: Pre-school
- Country of origin: Australia
- Original language: English
- No. of seasons: 2

Production
- Running time: 30 minutes

Original release
- Network: Imparja; NITV
- Release: 2013 – present

Jarjums is an Australian television series for preschoolers which screens on NITV. The series is dedicated to young and old alike. It provides fun and educational Indigenous and First Nations content from Australia and around the world. The series was originally screened on Imparja and the Nine Network.

== See also ==
- List of Australian television series
