= Saturday Sports Round-Up =

- Genre: Sports
- Presented by: Bert Bryant
- Country of origin: Australia
- Original language: English

Production
- Running time: 30 minutes; 25 minutes

Original release
- Network: GTV-9
- Release: 26 January 1957 – 1957

Saturday Sports Round-Up is an Australian television series which aired in Melbourne in 1957 on GTV-9. It debuted 26 January 1957, aired at 6:00PM Saturdays, and was hosted by Bert Bryant. It was described as "film and commentary of the day's events". It was the second sports series produced by a GTV-9, debuting two days after Eric Welch's Sports Album. At the time, television in Australia was limited to Sydney and Melbourne, and the vast majority of locally produced series were single-city only. The show originally aired in a 30-minute time-slot. It later aired in an unusual 25-minute time-slot.

== See also ==
- List of Australian television series
