= Malcolm Muggeridge Meets Australians =

- Genre: Talk show
- Presented by: Malcolm Muggeridge
- Country of origin: Australia
- Original language: English

Original release
- Network: ATN-7; GTV-9
- Release: 1958 – 1958

Malcolm Muggeridge Meets Australians was a short-lived Australian television series featuring British interviewer Malcolm Muggeridge, which aired in 1958. The series was produced in Sydney and was also shown in Melbourne via telerecordings. In Sydney it aired on ATN-7, and in Melbourne it aired on GTV-9, as this was prior to the creation of the Seven Network and Nine Network. An episode may be held by the National Film and Sound Archive.
