= The Burning Question (TV series) =

- Genre: Panel show
- Presented by: Malcolm Mackay
- Country of origin: Australia
- Original language: English

Original release
- Network: ATN-7
- Release: 1957 – 1960

The Burning Question is an Australian television series which aired from 1957 to 1960 on Sydney station ATN-7. It was a panel discussion series with Malcolm Mackay as moderator. Topics in the series included "should comics be banned?", "should the church remarry divorced people?", "will inflation increase?", and "can our roads be made safe?".
