= Person to Person (Australian TV series) =

- Genre: Talk show
- Presented by: Bob Sanders
- Country of origin: Australia
- Original language: English

Original release
- Network: ATN-7
- Release: 1959 – 1960

Person to Person was an Australian television series that aired from 1959 to 1960. It was an interview show, hosted by Bob Sanders and aired on ATN-7. Sanders interviewed people of topical interest.
