= Take It Easy (TV series) =

- Genre: Lifestyle
- Presented by: Bob Horsfall; Joy Fountain
- Country of origin: Australia
- Original language: English

Original release
- Release: 1959 – 1960

Take it Easy was an Australian television variety series which aired from 1959 to 1960 on Melbourne station GTV-9. Hosted by Bob Horsfall and Joy Fountain, the series aired at 1:00pm on Tuesdays, and included guests, contests and quizzes.

It represented an early attempt at midday programming by a Melbourne station, as television in the city was not yet a 24-hour service. Little else is known about the series.
