= Televisit =

- Genre: Lifestyle
- Presented by: David Farr; Joan Wilson
- Country of origin: Australia
- Original language: English

Original release
- Network: TVW-7
- Release: 1960 – 1965

Televisit is an Australian television series which aired on Perth station TVW-7 from 1960 to 1965. It was a daytime series for women. It was among the first series produced by the station, and is significant as one of the first series produced in Western Australia. The original presenters included David Farr and Joan Wilson.
