= The Jimmy Wheeler Show =

British TV comedy series (1956–1957)

The Jimmy Wheeler Show is the name of two different television series which starred English comedian Jimmy Wheeler.

The first was a British series which aired 1956–1957. Little is known about this series, which is believed to have been wiped.

The second was an Australian television series which aired on ABC during 1960. It was a 30-minute variety series. In one episode, the cast included singer Wheeler, Peggy Mortimer, juggler Lloyd Nairn, Stuart Finch, the Beryl Ellis Dancers and the Musical Troubadours. Archival status of this version is not known.
