= Floorshow =

- Genre: Variety
- Presented by: Joe Martin
- Starring: Enzo Toppano
- Country of origin: Australia
- Original language: English

Original release
- Network: ABC Television
- Release: 1963

Floorshow is an Australian television series which aired in 1963 on ABC Television. It was a variety series set in a fictional night-club, hosted by Joe Martin, and also featuring Enzo Toppano and his sextet. Acts included singers, dancers, musicians and such.

Despite having aired in an era where variety series were often wiped, three episodes are held by the National Film and Sound Archive.

== See also ==
- The Toppanos
