= Housemates (TV series) =

Australian reality TV documentary series

Housemates is an Australian reality television documentary series on ABC2. The series is produced by Mashup Pictures and features young Australians who combat housing affordability by living in share-houses, introducing audiences to unique living arrangements. It is directed and produced by Rob Innes.

The first season of Housemates became the fourth-most viewed factual documentary program on iview in 2016, so a second season was commissioned by Mashup Pictures which began screening in 2017.

== Series 1 ==
- Crunchy Town
- Private House
- App House
- Animal House

== Series 2 ==
- Stripper House
- Almost Vegan House
- Jesus House
- Anarchist House
