= Instant People =

- Also known as: The Nestle's Show
- Genre: Talk show
- Presented by: Keith Smith
- Country of origin: Australia
- Original language: English

Original release
- Network: Seven Network
- Release: 1962 – 1963

Instant People is an Australian television series which aired from 1962 to 1963 on the Seven Network, hosted by Keith Smith. It was also known as The Nestle's Show.

== Format ==
It was a Vox pop interview show. For example, one episode asked women on the street the question "should married women go to work?"; another interviewed a sixteen-year-old who left school to look after her ill mother and younger siblings following the death of her father; tested people's reactions to a bitter fruit cocktail; interviewed an art teacher, among other segments.

== Episode status ==
22 of the episodes are held by the National Film and Sound Archive. It would appear the series was produced on film, which may explain the high survival rate, though this is not confirmed.
