= First Appearances =

- Genre: Variety
- Presented by: Peter Colville
- Music by: ABC Dance Band
- Country of origin: Australia
- Original language: English

Production
- Running time: 30 minutes

Original release
- Network: ABC Television
- Release: 4 September 1962

First Appearances is an Australian television series which aired in 1962 for a short run on ABC. It was a variety series featuring acts not previously seen on ABC television. Hosted by Peter Colville, musical backing was provided by the ABC Dance Band conducted by Jim Gussey.
