= What's in the Picture =

- Genre: Panel game
- Presented by: Harry Dearth
- Country of origin: Australia
- Original language: English

Production
- Running time: 30 minutes

Original release
- Network: ABC Television
- Release: September 1958 – 1959

What's in the Picture is an Australian television panel game show which aired on ABC from 1958 to 1959. Produced and broadcast live in Sydney, it was also shown in Melbourne via telerecordings, a type of recording also known as a kinescope recordings. The series was hosted by Harry Dearth, and aired in a half-hour time-slot.

== Game play ==
A panel of celebrities were required to identify people and events from pictures shown on-screen.

== Episode status ==
Although 16mm film prints ("telerecordings") were made of the live broadcasts so the series could be shown in Melbourne, it is not known if any of these still exist.
