= Counter Play =

Australian television drama series

- Genre: Drama
- Created by: Chrys Phillips
- Written by: Chrys Phillips
- Directed by: Chrys Phillips
- Opening theme: "Falls" by Little Theatre
- Country of origin: Australia
- Original language: English
- No. of seasons: 2
- No. of episodes: 15

Production
- Executive producers: Chrys Phillips; Mikaela Phillips
- Production company: Free Spirit Creative

Original release
- Network: 9Gem Amazon Video
- Release: 27 August 2018 – present

Counter Play is an Australian television drama series screening on Nine Network's 9Gem in 2018. Created by Chrys Phillips, the series centres around the residents of the high-end affluent town of South Point.

== Plot ==
The series opens with protagonist Jake Spector (played by Tyson Martick) returning to town years after a near-fatal accident, driven solely by a desire for revenge. His girlfriend, Faith Morgan (portrayed by Mikaela Phillips), remains unaware of his true intentions. Morgan's family holds significant historical sway in the town, adding layers to the unfolding drama. Jake targets old friends and his former love interest, Riley Cornwall (played by Isabel Dilena), for what he perceives as betrayal after a fateful incident following their high school graduation. Jake initiates a series of calculated "play or be played" scenarios, intent on exposing everyone's secrets and lies. However, as the scenarios progress there is the increasing sign Jake may not be the only one involved with the threatening notes and is someone else infiltrating his game.

== Production ==
Counter Play was originally launched as a six-part web-series in 2016 and achieved major online success with 1.5 million total views. Joint producers Chrys and Mikaela Phillips decided to continue the series into Season 2 with plans for a commercial platform. Filming since October 2017, two seasons of the show were completed by May 2018 with plans for season 3 commencing mid-late 2018.

== Cast and characters ==
- Tyson Martick – Jake Spector/Aaron Robertson
- Mikaela Phillips – Faith Morgan
- Michelle Rowley – Mrs Heather Cornwall
- Isabel Dilena – Riley Cornwall
- Victor Gralak – Wes Morgan
- Luke Styles – Mayor Ferguson
- Sophie Thurling – Amber Rose
- Leigh Smith – Tim

== Broadcast ==
The series will premiere in Australia on Nine Network's 9Gem in 2018. The program was acquired by Amazon Video in the United States and officially premiered on August 27, 2018, and is available to stream in Australia. The show is also currently in negotiations with networks in the UK, New Zealand and Asia.
