= Once Upon a Dream (TV series) =

- Genre: Children's show
- Presented by: David Wenham
- Country of origin: Australia
- Original language: English
- No. of seasons: 1
- No. of episodes: 2

Production
- Production locations: Sydney, New South Wales
- Running time: 25 minutes

Original release
- Network: Network Ten
- Release: 16 October 2012 – present

Once Upon a Dream is an Australian children's television series. It airs on Network Ten. The six episodes take you behind the scenes of the Australian Ballet's production of Swan Lake. It is a documentary style series.
