= TV Showboat =

- Genre: Variety show
- Country of origin: Australia
- Original language: English

Production
- Running time: 30 minutes

Original release
- Network: ABC Television
- Release: 29 August 1960

TV Showboat is an Australian television series which aired in 1960 on ABC Television. A variety show with emphasis on music, it was produced in Melbourne and was kinescoped for showing in Sydney (it is not known if it was also shown on ABC's stations in Adelaide and Brisbane). Performers included singers Jim Berinson and Anne Lane, banjo player Hec McLennan, Fred King on Vibraphone and Clarinet. Producer was Leslie Ross

Episodes were 30 minutes in duration, in black-and-white. The series aired live.
