= Outback Ringer =

Outback Ringer is an Australian factual television series. It follows workers who retrieve feral cattle. The first season of ten episodes was first broadcast in 2020 on the ABC.

== See also ==
- Outback Wrangler
