= Shock, Horror, Aunty! =

- Genre: Comedy
- Presented by: Craig Reucassel
- Country of origin: Australia
- Original language: English
- No. of seasons: 2

Production
- Running time: 30 minutes

Original release
- Network: ABC1
- Release: 9 February – 27 December 2013

Shock, Horror, Aunty! was an Australian comedy television series that aired on ABC1 on 9 February 2013 until 27 December 2013. It was hosted by Craig Reucassel.
