= Take Three =

- Genre: Variety
- Starring: Sheila Bradley; Bill French; Bob Hornery; Johnny Ladd; Frank Camm
- Country of origin: Australia
- Original language: English

Production
- Running time: 30 minutes

Original release
- Network: ABC Television
- Release: 17 March 1961 – 1962

Take Three is an Australian television series that aired from 17 March 1961 to 1962 on ABC TV. A live 30-minute variety series with music and comedy, it featured Sheila Bradley, Bill French, Bob Hornery, and Johnny Ladd and Frank Camm.
