= What Next =

- Genre: Panel game
- Presented by: Bob Cornish
- Country of origin: Australia
- Original language: English

Original release
- Network: ABV-2
- Release: 1958 – 1959

What Next is an Australian television panel game show which aired on Melbourne station ABV-2 from 1958 to 1959. The series aired live. The exact format of the series is unknown, as is the archival status of the program. The show was hosted by Bob Cornish, and featured two teams competing against each other.
