= Fun with Frith =

- Genre: Children's
- Presented by: John Frith
- Country of origin: Australia
- Original language: English
- No. of episodes: 15

Production
- Running time: 5 minutes

Original release
- Network: HSV-7
- Release: 9 March – 15 June 1957

Fun with Frith is an early Australian television series. It aired on Melbourne station HSV-7 in 1957, from 9 March to 15 June 1957 for a total of fifteen episodes. The series was broadcast at 7:25PM on Saturdays, each episode being a brief 5 minutes long. The series featured cartoonist John Frith, who provided jokes and sketches.

Fun with Frith was preceded on HSV's schedule by American series Kaleidoscope and followed by another US series, Grantland Rice.

The archival status of Fun with Frith is not known. Additionally, it was not the only five-minute series to have aired on HSV-7 during 1957. For example, Green Fingers started off as a five-minute series before expanding to 15 minutes. GTV-9, meanwhile, offered a five-minute music series, also at 7:25PM on Saturdays, with Dennis Gibbons and Stan Stafford alternating each week.
