= Meet James Mossman =

- Genre: Talk show
- Presented by: James Mossman
- Country of origin: Australia
- Original language: English

Production
- Running time: 15 minutes

Original release
- Network: ATN-7
- Release: 6 October 1957 – 1958

Meet James Mossman is an Australian television series which aired from 1957 to 1958 on Sydney station ATN-7. It debuted 6 October 1957, and was a talk show. It aired in a 15-minute time-slot at 4:45PM on Sundays. At the time, most Australian series aired in a single city only.
