= Personal Touch =

- Genre: Lifestyle
- Presented by: Jim Swartzman; Mary Mackay
- Country of origin: Australia
- Original language: English

Original release
- Network: 0-10 Network
- Release: 1966

Personal Touch is an Australian television series which aired in 1966 on what would eventually become Network Ten. A monthly series, it was an interior decorating show featuring Jim Swartzman and Mary Mackay. In Sydney it aired at 3:00PM on Wednesdays, it was preceded on the schedule by Matinee Movie and followed by Owly's School. In Melbourne it aired at 3:30PM on Thursdays, preceded by Compass and followed by The Texan.
