= Melbourne Composers =

- Genre: Talk show
- Presented by: John Royle
- Country of origin: Australia
- Original language: English

Production
- Running time: 30 minutes

Original release
- Network: ABC Television
- Release: 1961 – 1962

Melbourne Composers is an Australian television series which aired 1961-1962(?) on ABC. It featured John Royle interviewing Melbourne composers, whose works were featured in the series.
