= 1959 in Australian television =

1959 in Australian television was the fourth year of television broadcasts in Australia.

== Events ==
Television Broadcasts in Western Australia were aired for the first time on 15 October 1959, TVW was opened by the Governor of Western Australia, Sir Charles Gairdner.

Television broadcasts in the state of Queensland (Brisbane) were aired for the very first time, starting with the Nine Network's QTQ on 16 August, followed soon after by the Seven Network's BTQ on 1 November, and the ABC's ABQ on the next day.

The first television station in Adelaide, South Australia (NWS-9) began broadcasting on 5 September.

On 1 July, Australian children's TV series Mr. Squiggle and Friends debuts on ABC starting off as a temporary fill in. Years later the show has been so popular it continues to air on the ABC until 9 July 1999.

Melbourne and Sydney are linked by microwave for the first time on 9 January, enabling television programs to be screened, simultaneously in both cities.

== Notable debuts and endings ==
Notable Australian series that debuted during 1959 included variety and/or music series Adelaide Tonight, The Bobby Limb Show, Six O'Clock Rock and Make Ours Music, game show Wheel of Fortune, discussion series The Critics, and short-lived drama series Emergency. Additionally, ATN-7 and GTV-9 experimented with local drama with the Shell Presents productions of plays.

Notable series which ended in 1959 included variety and/or music series Astor Showcase, Hit Parade and Sydney Tonight (which had been re-titled and re-formatted as Tonight), drama series Autumn Affair and Emergency, and comedy series Take That.

== New programming ==
=== Domestic ===
- 16 February – Emergency (Nine Network - Melbourne)
- 9 April – Balance Your Budget (Nine Network)
- 13 May – Eric Baume's Viewpoint (Nine Network)
- 1 July – Mr. Squiggle and Friends (ABC TV)
- 9 July – Rooftop Rendezvous (ABC TV)
- 26 July – Don't Argue (Seven Network - Melbourne)
- 29 July – What's On (Seven Network)
- 29 July – Let's Make Clothes (Seven Network)
- 31 July – About Your Garden (Seven Network - Melbourne)
- 1 November – Canberra Report (Seven Network - Sydney)
- 6 December – On the Spot (Nine Network - Melbourne)
- 29 December – New Look at New Guinea (ABC TV)

=== International ===
- 2 January – (United States) The Donna Reed Show (ABC TV)
- 30 January/8 June – (United States) Rescue 8 (30 January: Seven Network - Sydney, 8 June: Nine Network - Melbourne)
- 2 February – (United States) Frontier Doctor (Seven Network)
- 5 February – (United States) Naked City (Nine Network)
- 13 April – (United States) Wanted Dead or Alive (Nine Network)
- 24 May – (United Kingdom) The Adventures of William Tell (Seven Network)
- 7 August/4 September – (United States) Adventures of Pow Wow (7 August: Seven Network - Sydney, 4 September: Nine Network - Melbourne)
- 22 August – (United States) Bronco (Nine Network - Sydney, Seven Network - Melbourne)
- 31 August – (United Kingdom) The Invisible Man (1958) (Seven Network)
- 12 October – (United Kingdom) Sword of Freedom (ABC TV)
- (United States) Huckleberry Hound (Nine Network - Sydney, Seven Network - Melbourne)
- (United States) Spunky and Tadpole (Nine Network)
- (United States) Quick Draw McGraw (Nine Network - Sydney, Seven Network - Melbourne)
- (United Kingdom) / (Canada) Cannonball (Nine Network)
- (United States) Tom Terrific (Nine Network - Sydney, Seven Network - Melbourne)
- (United States) 77 Sunset Strip (Seven Network)
- (United States) Union Pacific (Seven Network)
- (United States) Peter Gunn (Nine Network)
- (United States) Mackenzie's Raiders (Seven Network)

== Television shows ==
=== 1950s ===
- Australian Unlimited (1956 – 1961)
- The Late Show (1957 – 1959)
- Swallow's Juniors (1957 – 1970)
- The Price is Right (1957 – 1959)
- The Happy Go Lucky Show (1957 – 1959)
- Binnie Time (1958 – 1959)
- My Fair Lady (1958 – 1962)
- That's My Desire (1958 – 1960)
- Room for Two (1958 – 1959)
- The Toppanos (1958 – 1959)
- Binnie Time (1958 – 1959)
- The Annette Klooger Show (1959 – 1961)
- Bandwagon (1959 – 1960)
- Sweet and Low (1959)
- Mr. Squiggle and Friends (1959 – 1999)
- Serenade (1959 – 1960)

== Ending this year ==
Date	Show	Channel	Debut
14 January	Keeping Company	Nine Network	27 August 1958
6 May	Personal Column	Seven Network	27 August 1958
10 May	Face the Nation	Nine Network	20 July 1958
12 May	Personal Album	Nine Network	18 November 1958
18 May	Seeing Stars	ABC TV	1957
1 June	Emergency	Nine Network	16 February 1959
24 July	Movie Guide	Seven Network	29 August 1958
24 July	Green Fingers	Seven Network	22 March 1957
12 October	Strictly for Mothers	Seven Network	27 July 1959
14 October	Like You to Meet	Seven Network	29 July 1959
14 October	Let's Make Clothes	Seven Network	29 July 1959
14 October	What's On	Seven Network	14 July 1959
4 November	The Happy Go Lucky Show	Nine Network	30 October 1957
13 December	Don't Argue	Seven Network	26 July 1959

== See also ==
- NWS-9
