= Strictly for Mothers =

- Genre: Lifestyle
- Presented by: Jean Battersby
- Country of origin: Australia
- Original language: English

Production
- Running time: 30 minutes

Original release
- Network: HSV-7
- Release: 27 July – 12 October 1959

Strictly for Mothers was an Australian television series, which aired on Melbourne television station HSV-7. The weekly half-hour daytime series was short-lived, broadcast on Mondays from 27 July 1959 to 12 October 1959 at 2:45PM. It was a series aimed at mothers and expectant mothers. It was hosted by Jean Battersby. It was followed on HSV-7's schedule by Snakes and Ladders, a short-lived game show.

Jean Battersby's other hosting duties during the 1950s at HSV-7 included What's On, which aired during the same months as Strictly for Mothers, but on Wednesdays, and she also was the host of Movie Guide (Fridays, 29 August 1958 to 24 July 1959) and Personal Column (1958-1959). All of these were daytime series.

This was not the first time a personality at HSV-7 did several series in a row or at the same time. In 1956, Eric Pearce hosted novelty game show I've Got a Secret (1956-1958), co-hosted the very short-lived Eric and Mary, was a newsreader on HSV-7's newscast, and in early 1957 began hosting Be My Guest.
