= Snakes and Ladders (game show) =

- Genre: Game show
- Presented by: Pat Hodgins
- Country of origin: Australia
- Original language: English

Production
- Running time: 30 minutes

Original release
- Network: HSV-7
- Release: 1959

Snakes and Ladders is a short-lived Australian television game show which aired on Melbourne station HSV-7 in 1959. Hosted by Pat Hodgins, it was a half-hour 'jackpot quiz' based on the board game of the same name. It was preceded on the HSV-7's schedule by Strictly for Mothers (with Jean Battersby) and followed by Home Decorator (with Joyce Turner). It is extremely unlikely that any of the episodes exist as kinescope recordings, and as such it is likely lost.

A different Snakes and Ladders aired from 1965 to 1966 on the 0-10 Network (now Network Ten). Hosted by Chuck Faulkner, it is not known if it had any connection with the 1959 series. It is not known if anything remains of the series.
