= Health Club (TV series) =

- Also known as: Health and Happiness
- Genre: Lifestyle
- Presented by: Beryl Wright
- Country of origin: Australia
- Original language: English

Production
- Running time: 15 minutes

Original release
- Network: HSV-7
- Release: 1957 – 1959

Health Club is an Australian television series which aired from 1957 to 1959, also known as Health and Happiness. A daytime series aired on Melbourne station HSV-7, very little information is available on the series, however it is notable as an early example of an Australian television series aimed at women. A 15-minute series, it was hosted by Beryl Wright and aired weekly on Wednesdays.

For much of its run, it aired as part of a programming block called Home, which also included The Jean Bowring Show. For example, on 13 November 1957 the Home Programme consisted of Cooking (with Jean Bowring), Home Decoration (with Joyce Turner), Beauty (with Bambi Smith), Shopping Guide (with Brenda Marshall) and Health Club, with the programming block running from 2:30PM to 4:00PM, and followed by the station signing-off for 75 minutes.

Under the Health and Happiness title during 1959, the series was preceded on the HSV schedule by My Fair Lady and followed by Drama (which typically consisted of selections of American anthology series Four Star Playhouse).
