= Personal Column =

Personal Column may refer to:

- Personal advertisement, a form of classified advertising
- "Personal Column" (TV series), broadcast in Australia in 1958 and 1959
- Personal Column (film), original title Pièges, a 1939 French film
- Lured, also known as Personal Column, a 1947 American film, a remake of the French film
