= Room for Two =

Room for Two may refer to:

- Room for Two (film), a 1940 British comedy film
- Room for Two (American TV series), a 1992 American sitcom television series
- Room for Two (Australian TV series), 1958–1959

== See also ==
- "Room for 2", a 2016 song by Dua Lipa, from her debut self-titled album
