= David Thomas Worrall =

David Thomas Worrall (18 June 1894 – 12 April 1968) was an Australian journalist, radio station manager and soldier. Worrall was born in Castle Hill, New South Wales and died in St Kilda, Victoria.

== Military service ==
David Worrall enlisted with the Australian Imperial Force on 14 October 1915. He saw service in Egypt, France and Sydney. He was wounded at Pozières, France in August 1916 and then spent some time in England in recovery. He was discharged on 29 July 1919.

== Journalism ==
Prior to enlisting, Worrall had worked for The Leader newspaper in Orange, New South Wales. After discharge from the A.I.F., Worrall returned to journalism; his first job being with the Newcastle Morning Herald. Melbourne's Sun News-Pictorial commenced publication in 1922 and Worrall was one of the first journalists to be employed there. In 1925, he went to New York where he provided articles for the New York World, as well as supplying material on a freelance basis to The Herald (Melbourne) and The Sun (Sydney). He settled in Melbourne in 1928, beginning a long association with Keith Murdoch and the Murdoch media. In the late 1920s, he organised the Herald learn-to-swim campaign and their Ideal Town competition.

== 3DB ==
Worrall is perhaps best known as the long-running manager of Melbourne radio station 3DB. 3DB commenced broadcasting in 1927 under the ownership of the Druleigh Business and Technical College Pty Ltd, hence the DB call-sign. However, from 1929 until 1987, 3DB was owned and operated by the Herald & Weekly Times (HWT), owners of The Herald and The Sun News-Pictorial.

David Worrall was appointed manager of the station in 1929, by the Herald and Weekly Times' Sir Keith Murdoch, and he was to remain as manager until 1958. He was responsible for introducing many big-budget programs covering all forms of broadcastable material which, inter alia, made 3DB the top station in all Melbourne radio surveys for many decades.

== Major Broadcasting Network ==
Worrall also formed the Major Broadcasting Network, with associated stations throughout Australia. From its formation in 1938 until its closure in the late 1970s, the Major Network was usually recognised as being second in importance after its rival, the Macquarie Radio Network.

== Australian Federation of "B" Broadcasting Stations ==
In 1930 Worrall helped to form the Australian Federation of "B" Broadcasting Stations, now Commercial Radio Australia, and he was its Federal President in 1938.

== Family ==
David Worrall was the son of Thomas Hirst Worrall, an English-born orchardist and artist, and his wife Emily Jane née Barker.

He grew up in West Maitland, New South Wales, and was educated at public schools in the Hunter Valley.

In 1929, he married Kathleen Zoe née Norris at the Independent Church, Collins Street, Melbourne. Kathleen Worrall became a prominent broadcaster in her own right, using the nom-de-plume Martha Gardener. She first broadcast on 3DB and later 3AW, 3UZ, ABC radio and GTV9. Her programs, aimed mainly at a female audience, offered handy hints to listeners, usually in answer to their questions.

== See also ==
- 3DB
- Major Broadcasting Network
- Australian Federation of "B" Broadcasting Stations
- Herald and Weekly Times
- Sir Hugh Denison
- Sir Keith Arthur Murdoch
- Sidney Myer
- Martha Gardener (broadcaster)
