= Fashion Digest =

- Genre: Lifestyle
- Presented by: Sylvia Rapley
- Country of origin: Australia
- Original language: English

Production
- Running time: 15 minutes

Original release
- Network: ATN-7 (Sydney); GTV-9 (Melbourne)
- Release: 10 August 1960 – 1961

Fashion Digest is an Australian television series aired 1960–1961 on Sydney station ATN-7, and also aired on Melbourne station GTV-9 (this was prior to the creation of the Nine Network and Seven Network). The series featured Sylvia Rapley, who had a regular segment on the series Your Home. Fashion Digest was a weekly series aired in a 15-minute time-slot.

Rapley gave sewing demonstrations on the series, and advised women on how to dress. The series was produced in Sydney.

== See also ==
- Let's Make Clothes
