= Like You to Meet =

- Genre: Talk show
- Presented by: Geoff Raymond
- Country of origin: Australia
- Original language: English

Original release
- Network: HSV-7
- Release: 29 July – 14 October 1959

Like You to Meet was an Australian television series which aired 1959 on Melbourne station HSV-7, on Wednesdays from 29 July 1959 to 14 October 1959. It was an interview series with Geoff Raymond. The 15-minute series aired at 4:15PM, on a daytime schedule which also included shows like Let's Make Clothes and The Jean Bowring Show.
