= Gordon De Lisle =

Australian mid-20th-century photographer and gallerist

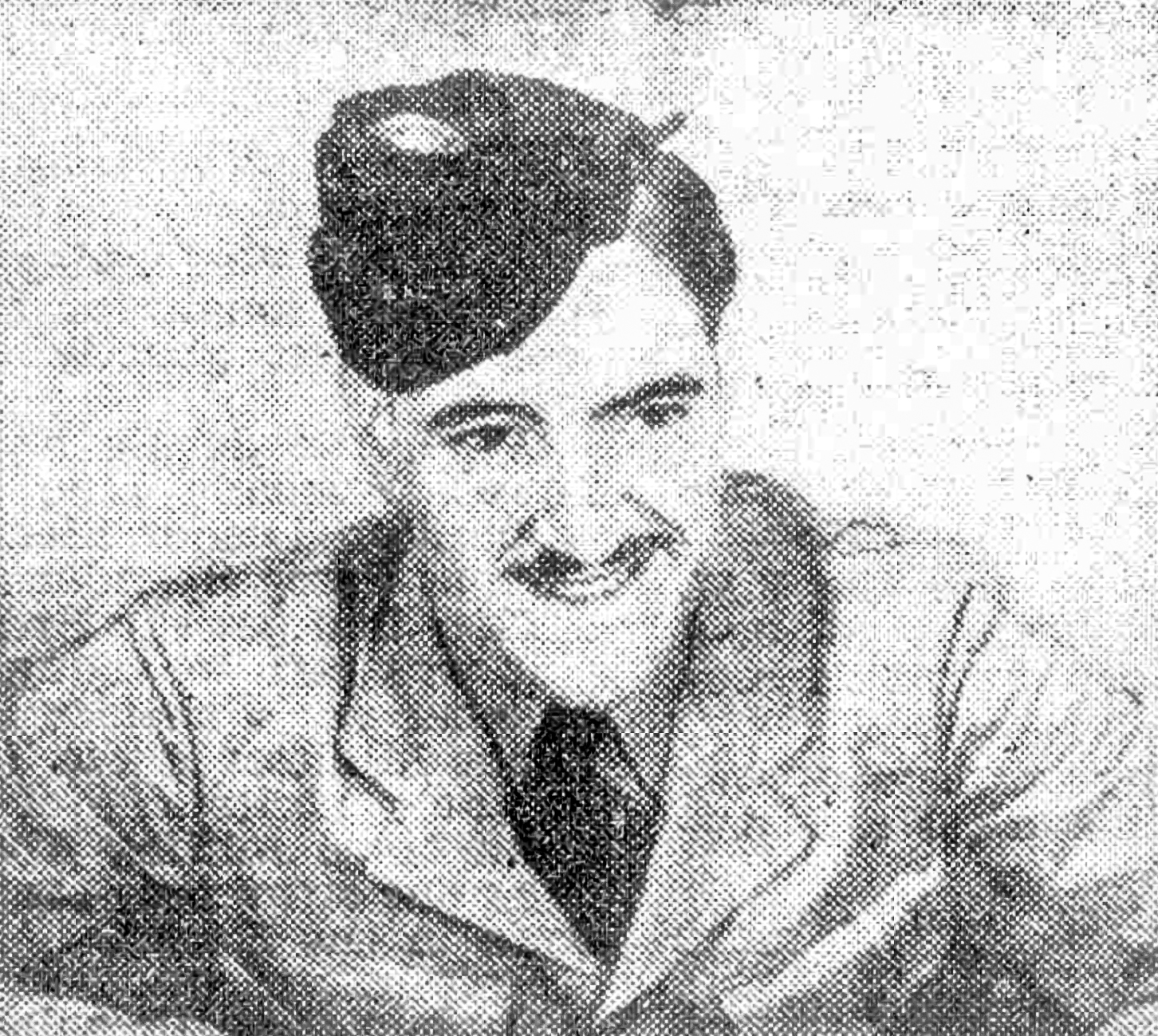
Leading aircraftman Gordon De Lisle in 1943

Gordon Franklin de Lisle (28 Feb 1923–2002 Died at age 79) FRPS, FRSA, EFIAP (Excellence de la Federation de l' Art Photographique) was an Australian commercial photographer, lecturer in photography and gallery owner.

== Training ==
De Lisle, who in business styled his name 'De'Lisle', was born in Melbourne 28 Feb 1923. His father was Arthur Thoby Haversleigh Prinsep, a member of the well-known Prinsep family. Prinsep was an actor, journalist and fiction writer, who wrote under the name of Fabiau Esme D’Aigular Coligney De L'Isle, and Frankland De Lisle. Prinsep, known as De Lisle at the time, died when Gordon was 11. Gordon left school at 13 to help support his mother Ada (who later lived in Mt Macedon) and sister. He trained in photography from 1939 as a cadet at age fifteen on the pictorial staff of The Daily Telegraph (Sydney) and The Australian Women's Weekly. When the war began he joined the merchant marine and participated in the evacuation of the Solomon Islands, then at eighteen joined the RAAF as a radar operator, but was soon reassigned as a photographer. He flew in Catalina flying-boats for four years on reconnaissance and torpedo-training duties, with frequent assignments to Mitchell and Liberator squadrons. He was engaged in 1945 to Bettie Tuck.

He found time and means during the war to write and photograph for newspapers and magazines including an article on Marjorie Lawrence's concerts for armed service personnel. After his demobilisation in 1945 De Lisle faced charges and a £2 fine for keeping his Colt service pistol in ignorance of Victorian regulations being at odds with Queensland's.

== Professional photographer ==
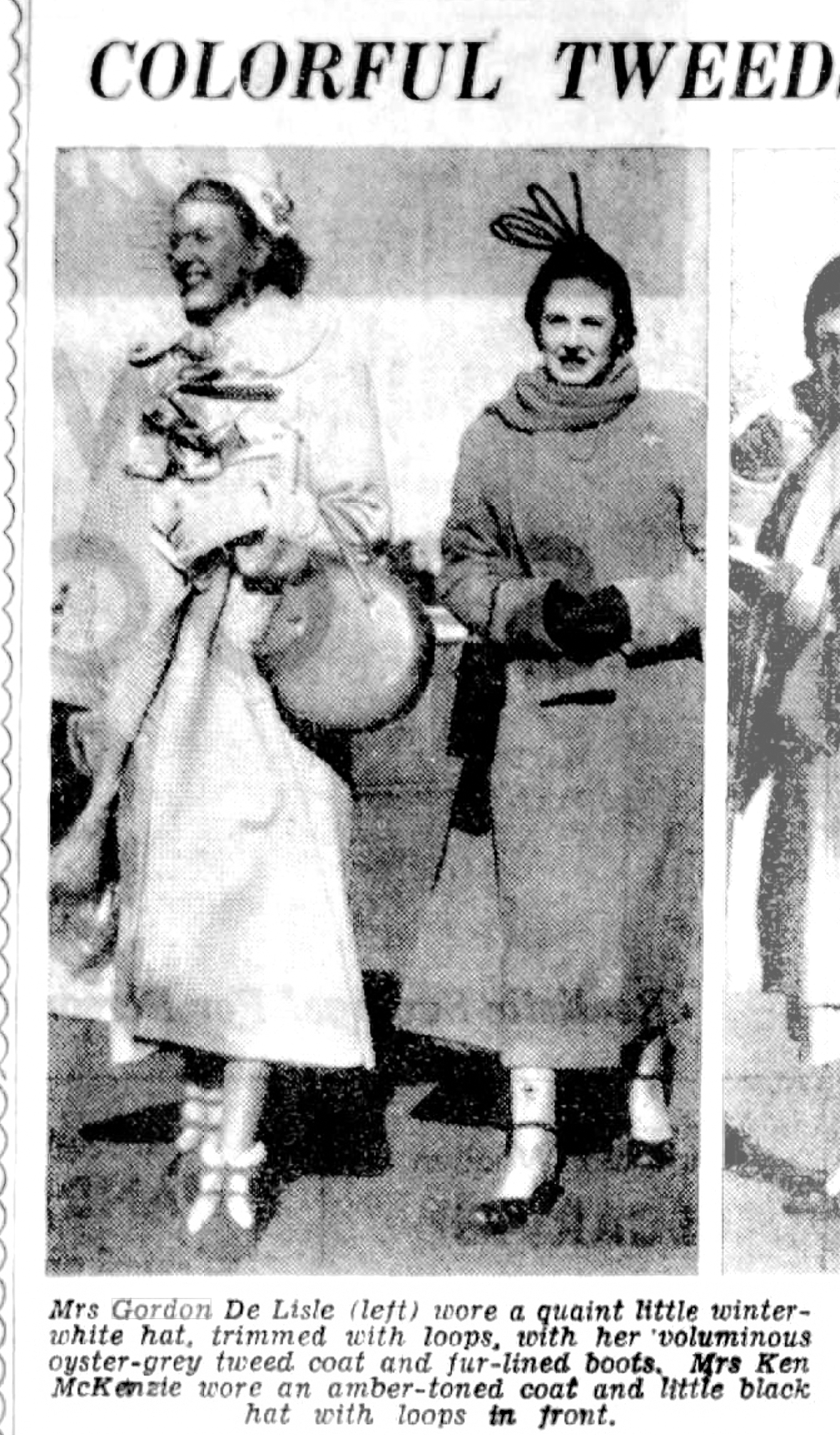
Fashion model Cynthia De Lisle at the races in a press photo from the Woman's World page of the Melbourne Herald

After the war in 1947 De'Lisle opened his own photographic studios in the Exhibition Buildings specialising in society portraits, industrial, aerial and automotive photography, and met, and on 20 February 1948 married after nearly a year's engagement, Merton Hall-educated model Cynthia Ferguson of Malvern, who worked for Georges department store. Parties associated with the engagement and wedding were well publicised and the Lord Mayor Sir Raymond Connelly attended the reception.

They travelled 1948–1949, he first to Indonesia before the couple toured Britain and Europe, then returned to Melbourne before the birth in April 1949 of their first child Jeanine (Jennie) Christina. He installed his business at 9 Collins Street in the Grosvenor Chambers where Wolfgang Sievers also had a studio only doors away from their friend Athol Shmith, to concentrate on commercial and fashion photography. The Department of Trade and Industry was amongst his clients.

From 1949 De Lisle was a stringer for the Sydney Morning Herald magazine and newspaper group in Melbourne and was living in the wealthy suburb of Brighton in Grosvenor Court, 260 St Kilda Street. Through this franchise his picture of a tractor-driving monkey was published in Life magazine in February 1963 and, by popular demand, a whole series from the same story May 1964.

He relinquished the SMH role when in 1958/9 director Stanley Kramer appointed him stills photographer on the motion picture On the Beach, to produce thousands of production prints for the film. Subsequently, he returned to advertising photography. In 1966 he was styling his business more broadly as "public relations" and advertised for "PR men" using the tone-drop-out image of a pouting woman apparently speaking the words.

== Publisher ==
In 1963 De Lisle and his wife Cynthia started a publishing company, Joey Books Pty. Ltd., and with writer Joyce Nicholson photographed and designed their first book Kerri and Honey, one of a series of their children's books with the same author.

== Recognition ==
De Lisle was a member of Melbourne Camera Club and exhibited with Group M in the 1960s and won international photographic contests. Among other prizes was a third in the U.S. Camera magazine international contest, from 158,000 entries, and in 1960 the magazine noted that "of 5 prizes being shipped to Australia, 4 are going to one photographer, Gordon De Lisle, a past U.S. Camera winner." His series of "Australia" posters won awards in American Art Directors' exhibitions, with one winning thirteen. A member of the Institute of Australian Photographers (IAP) he was the invited speaker at its October 1969 'Hypo' bi-annual convention in Canberra at which he agitated for better remuneration for photographic services;

"This is a profession where a photographer with a lifetime of training and with plant worth $20,000 finishes with exactly the same money for taking a fashion photograph, processing it, retouching it, packing it and delivering a ten-by-eight print as does his model: whose plant is a bra, panties, and a pair of false eyelashes! This is a profession whose ideas are pillaged consistently and blatantly by art directors of advertising agencies; who pay the photographers’ meagre fees, with luck and after endless dispute, in five months. Above all, this is a weak-kneed, spineless profession, whose members wallow in apathy and self-adoration; while those trades and professions about them get on with the task. Do any of you really feel any concern for your image? Are you content to be made to look like bumbling congenital idiots on television? Are you content to do more and more, yet accept less and less? Are you content to slash the “ground from under your contemporaries by every known price-cutting device? And here’s something of particular importance to your wives and children! Do you know what the community thinks of you? The Sociology Department of the University of New South Wales does! It finds you enjoying precisely the same esteem in the eyes of your fellow citizens as do beekeepers, [and] bank clerks..."

== Educator ==
In 1970 De Lisle, then in his late forties, followed Ian McKenzie as Senior Lecturer in Charge Photography in the Diploma stream of Prahran College of Technology where he researched videotape and electronic education, hired by the vocationally-oriented graphic designer Principal Alan Warren but after suffering a severe heart attack, was replaced with Athol Shmith by the incoming Principal Dr David Armstrong, in 1971.

While at Prahran he worked on his high-contrast photomontage series on “the raped land, Australia, as it would appear to a woman who returns from the dead to discover that her country, too, is dying,” which combined his love of the Australian landscape and the female form, and was exhibited and published in 1972 in the Ilford-funded Concern.

Though he contributed to charities, and decried cruelty to sheep, and expressed sympathy for the plight of Marilyn Monroe in letters to newspapers, De Lisle had a reputation at the college for a wolfish attitude to young women, and one of De Lisle's students, and employee at his studio, was Graham Howe, who regarded him "as the Sam Haskins of Australia". Victorian premier of 1955–72, Henry Bolte's vice squad raided his family home, confiscating his "pornography"; nudes for which he was then winning international awards, an experience which confirmed his vehemently expressed opposition to censorship, particularly of the arts. A regular writer of letters to the editor, he notoriously criticised the new National Gallery in Melbourne: "The building squats, featureless, like an obscure grey telephone exchange, floating in already scungy moats floored with lolly papers ... like a bleak penitentiary."

== Later life ==
In 1974 the De Lisle family moved to the Sunshine Coast and established the DeLisle (now Montville) Art Gallery, first at Buderim and from later in 1974 at Montville, renovating the colonial Manjalda homestead which in 1915 had been designed to accommodate about 35 people and was sited between St. Mary's Church of England and the School of Arts. Its croquet lawn, exotic tropical gardens with Balinese statuary, a hot tub beneath a huge frangipani tree and ocean views, proved attractive to tourists. De Lisle enjoyed the roles of hotelier and gallerist and adopted a relaxed and gregarious bohemian lifestyle.

He retired in 1991, and on his death in 2002 was survived by Cynthia, his wife of 54 years, his daughter Jennie, sons Rodney, and artist Christopher, who has continued to operate the gallery, and eight grandchildren and one great-grandchild. Another son, James, died in 1997.

== Publications ==
- Nicholson, Joyce; De Lisle, Gordon (1963). Kerri and Honey. Story by Joyce Nicholson. Photography by Gordon De'Lisle. OCLC 1079106430.
- Nicholson, Joyce; De’Lisle, Gordon (1963). Cranky. The baby Australian camel. Story by Joyce Nicholson, photography by Gordon De'Lisle. Angus & Robertson: London; Tokyo printed. OCLC 562512677.
- Nicholson, Joyce; De'Lisle, Gordon (1964). Andy's kangaroo; story. Melbourne: Lansdowne. OCLC 1415244.
- Nicholson, Joyce (1966). Ringtail the possum. Angus & Robertson. OCLC 30297769.
- White, Osmar; De'Lisle, Gordon (1968). Melbourne. Melbourne: Hill of Content Pub. OCLC 465890.
- De'Lisle, Gordon (1970). Of woman, love and beauty. Melbourne: Joey Books. ISBN 978-0-9599825-0-3. OCLC 205151.
- De'lisle, Gordon (1971). Introducing Australia. New York: Taplinger Pub. Co. ISBN 978-0-8008-4198-0. OCLC 301394396.

== Collections ==
- National Library of Australia; 674 images
- National Archives of Australia, 300+ images

== Gallery of De Lisle 1950s photographs ==
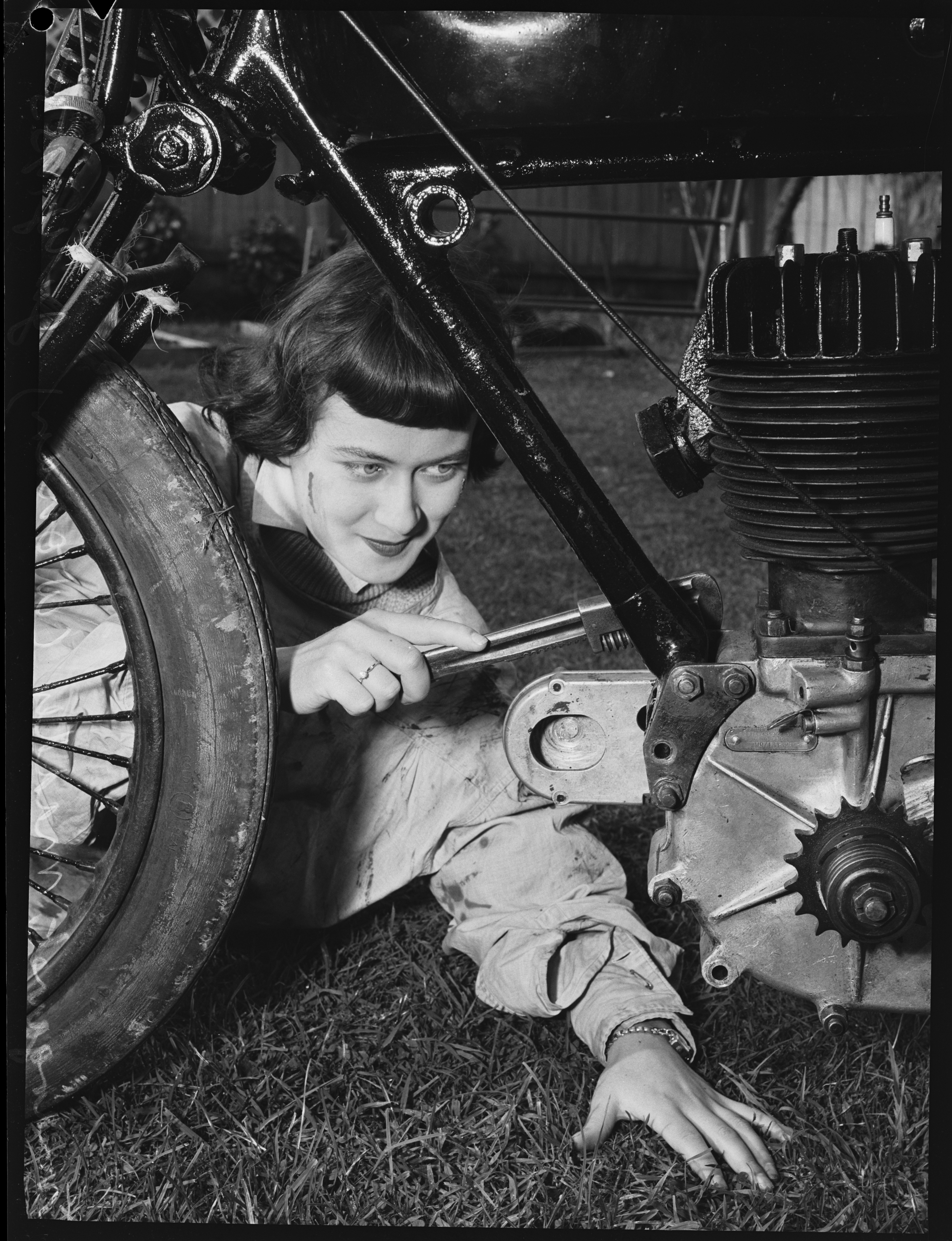

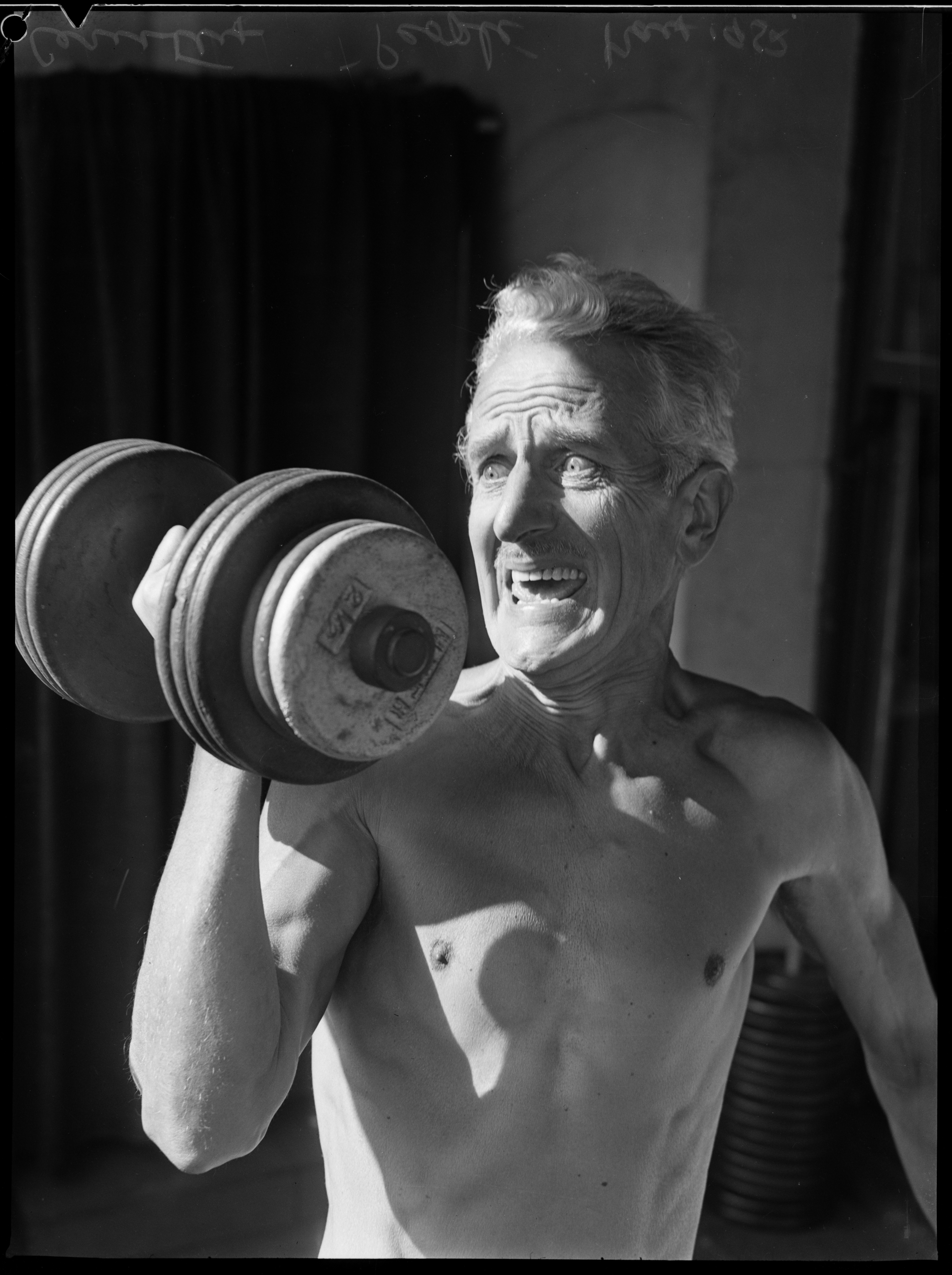

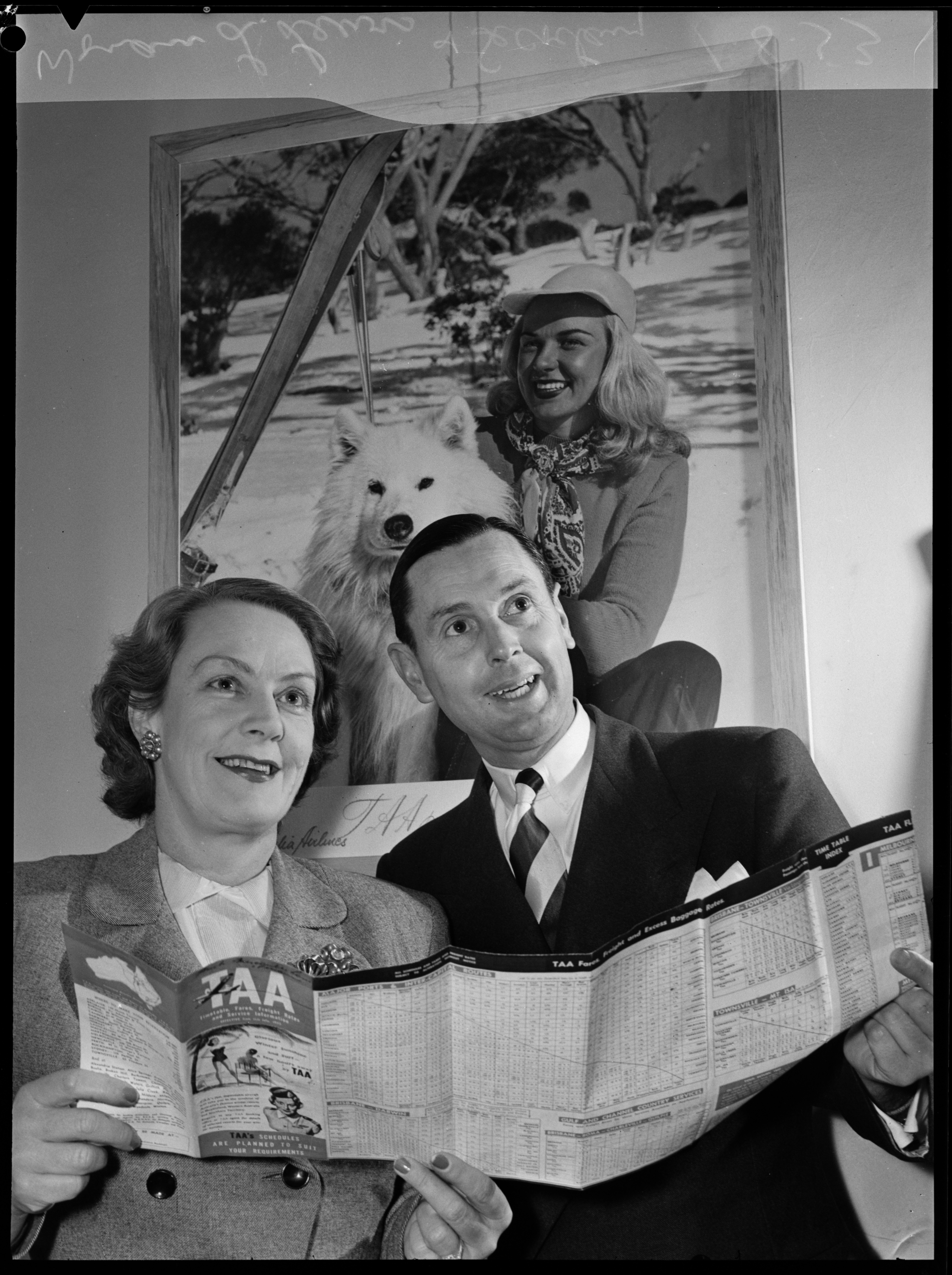

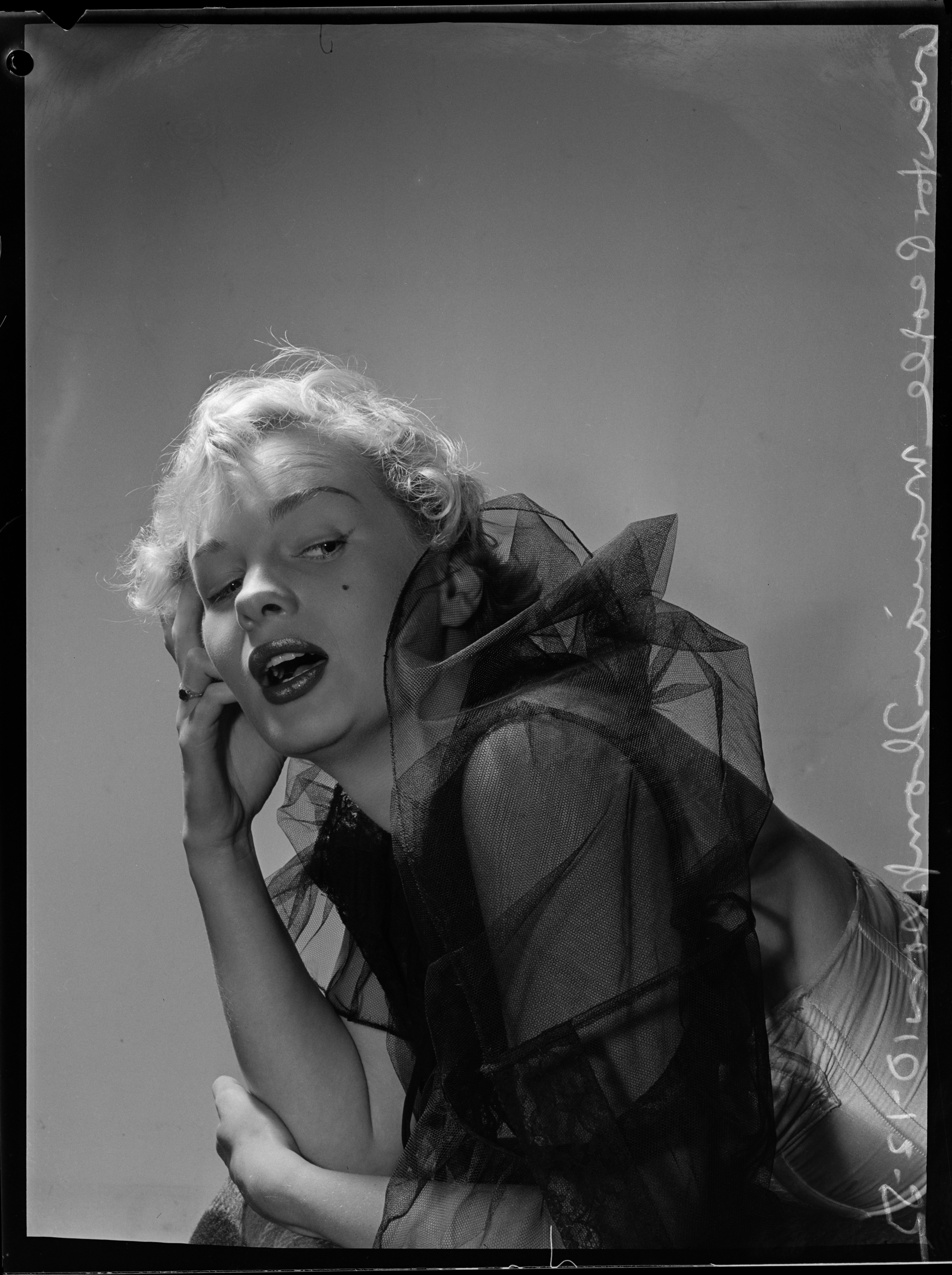

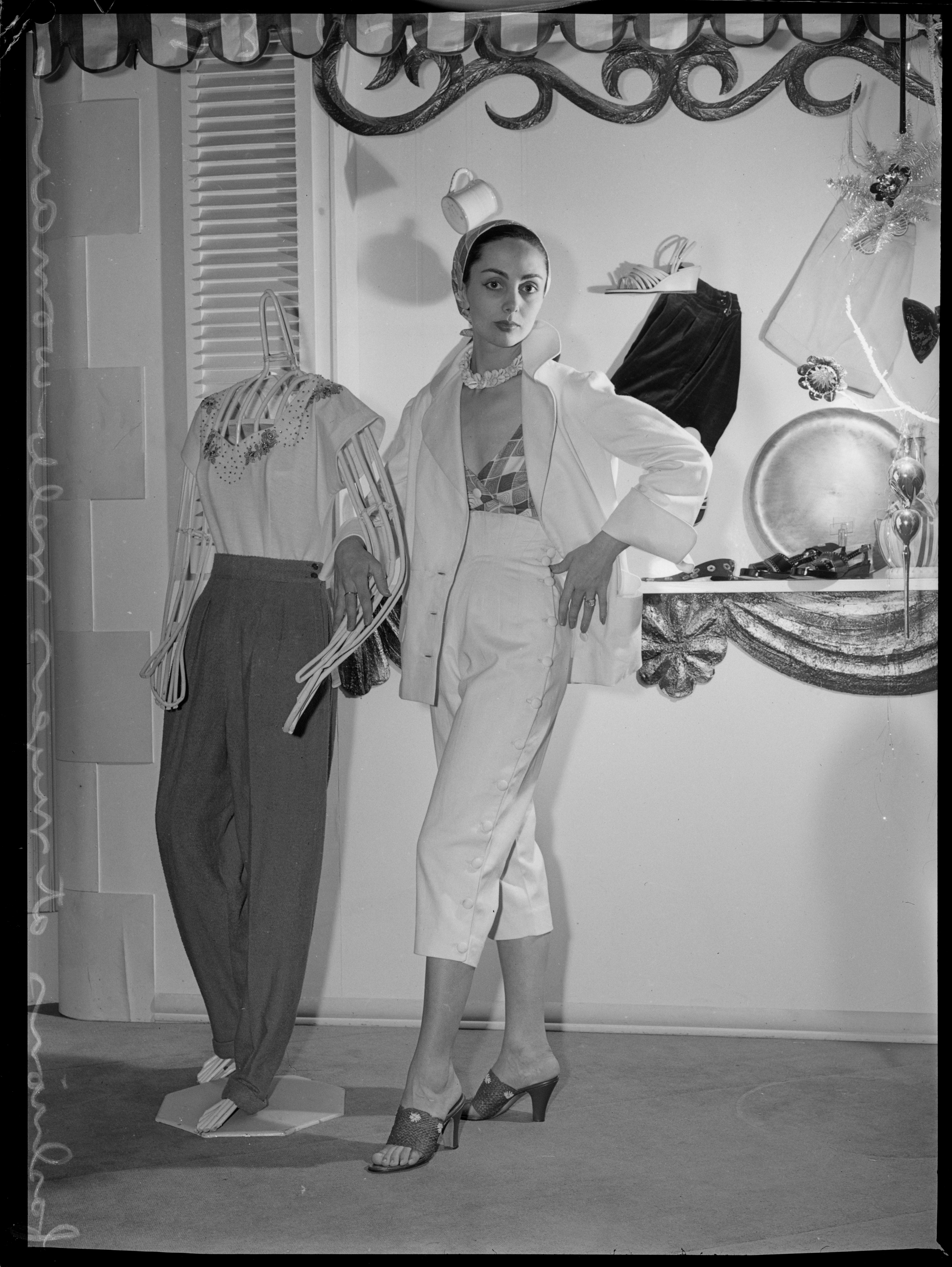

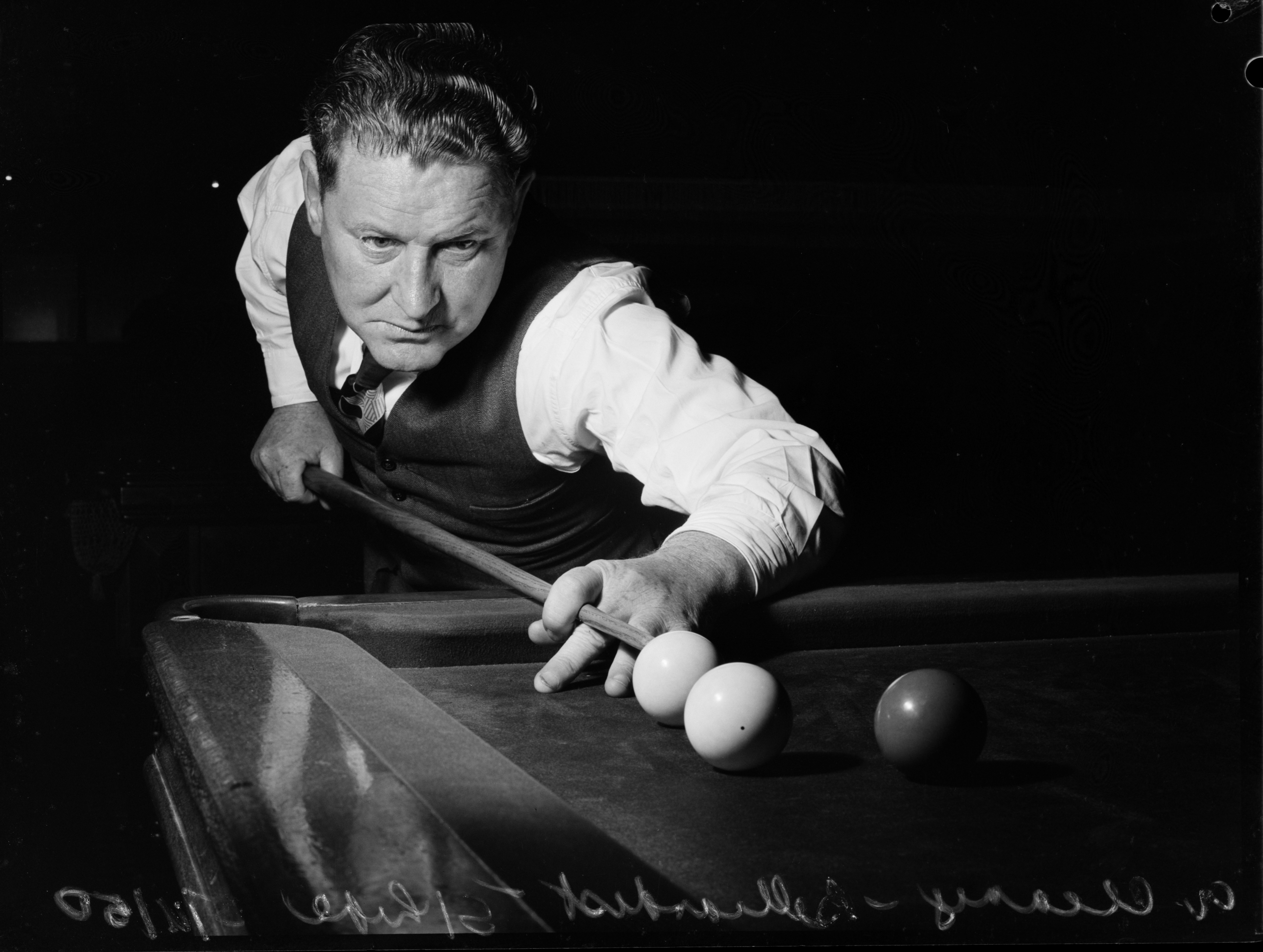

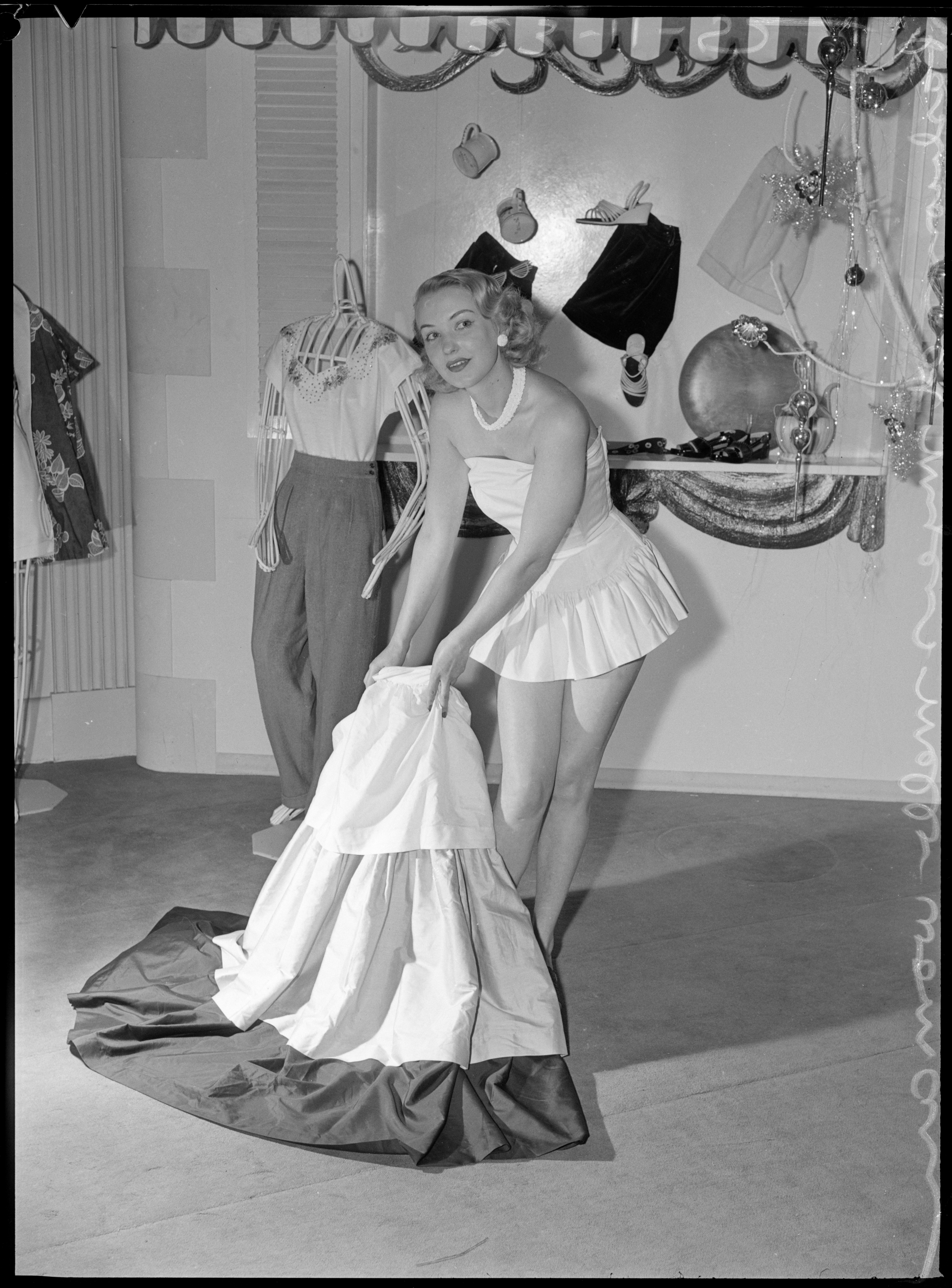

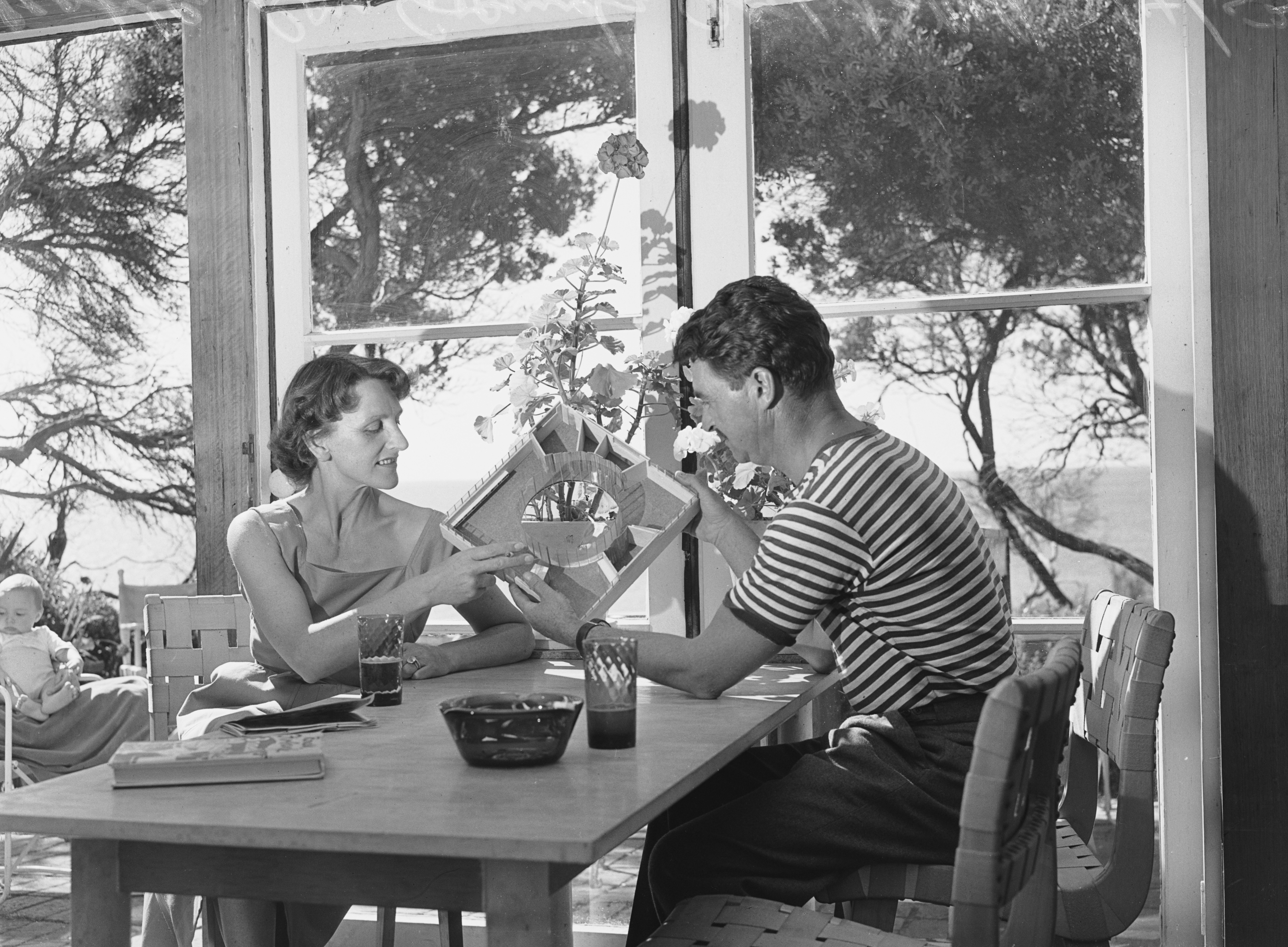

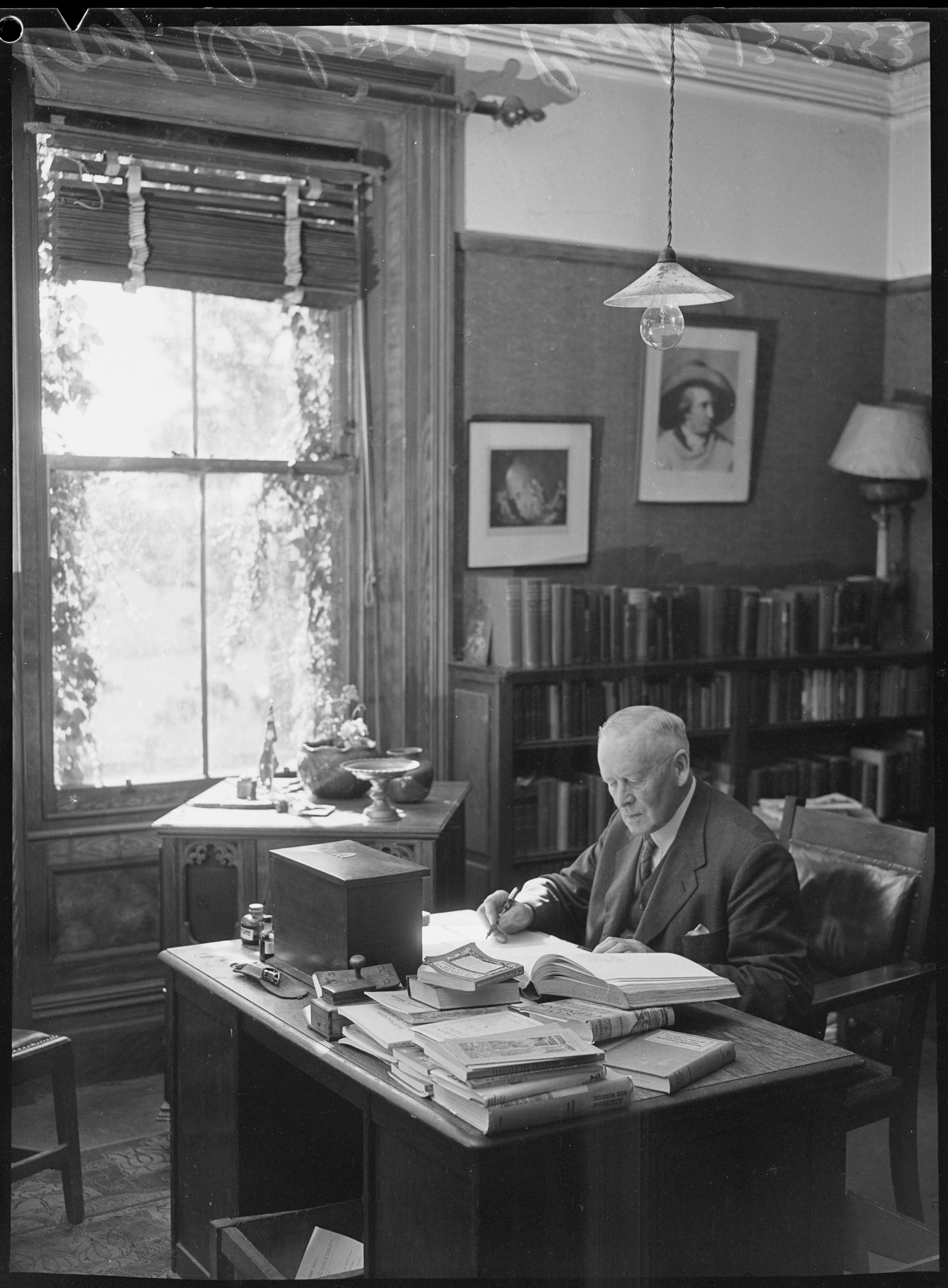

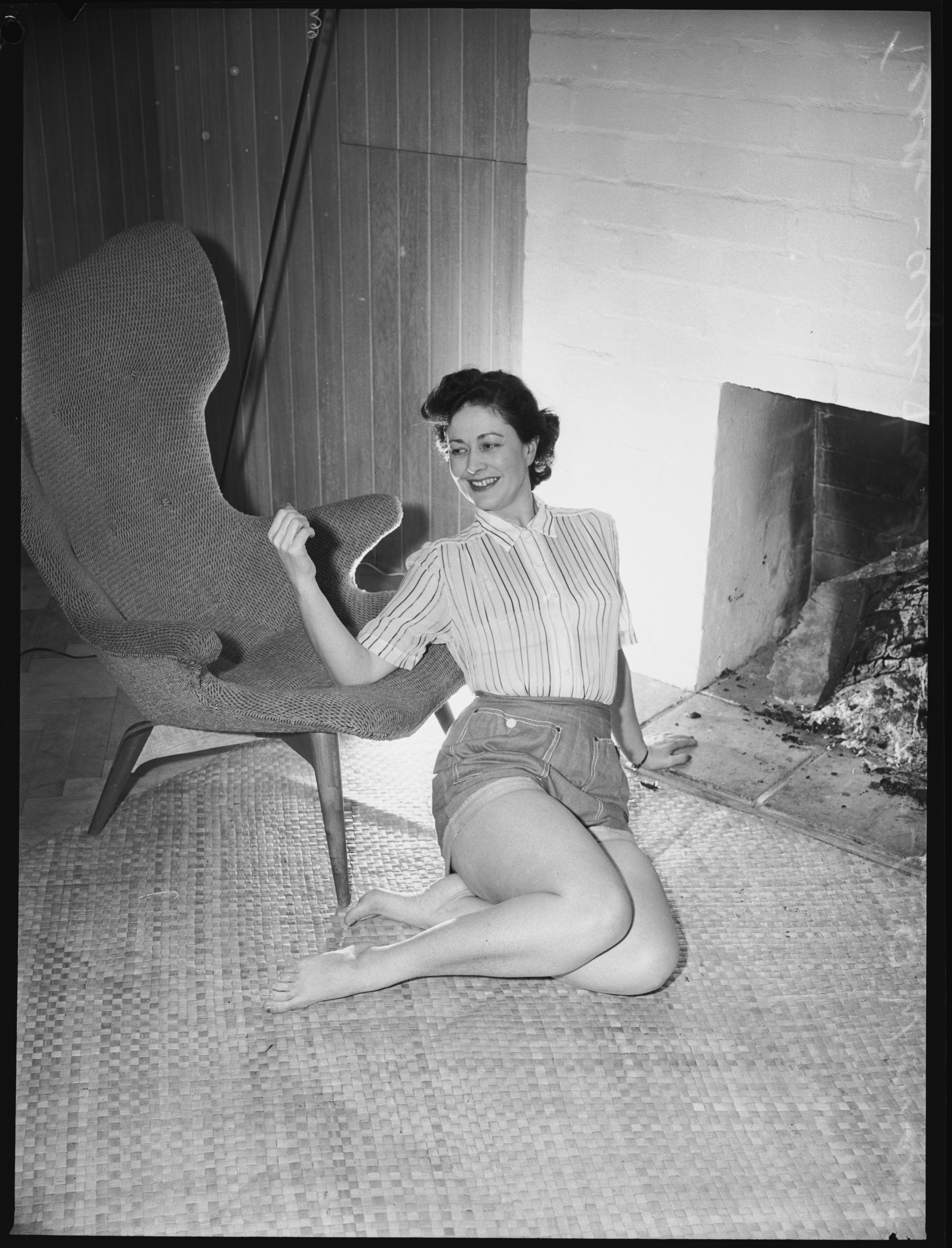

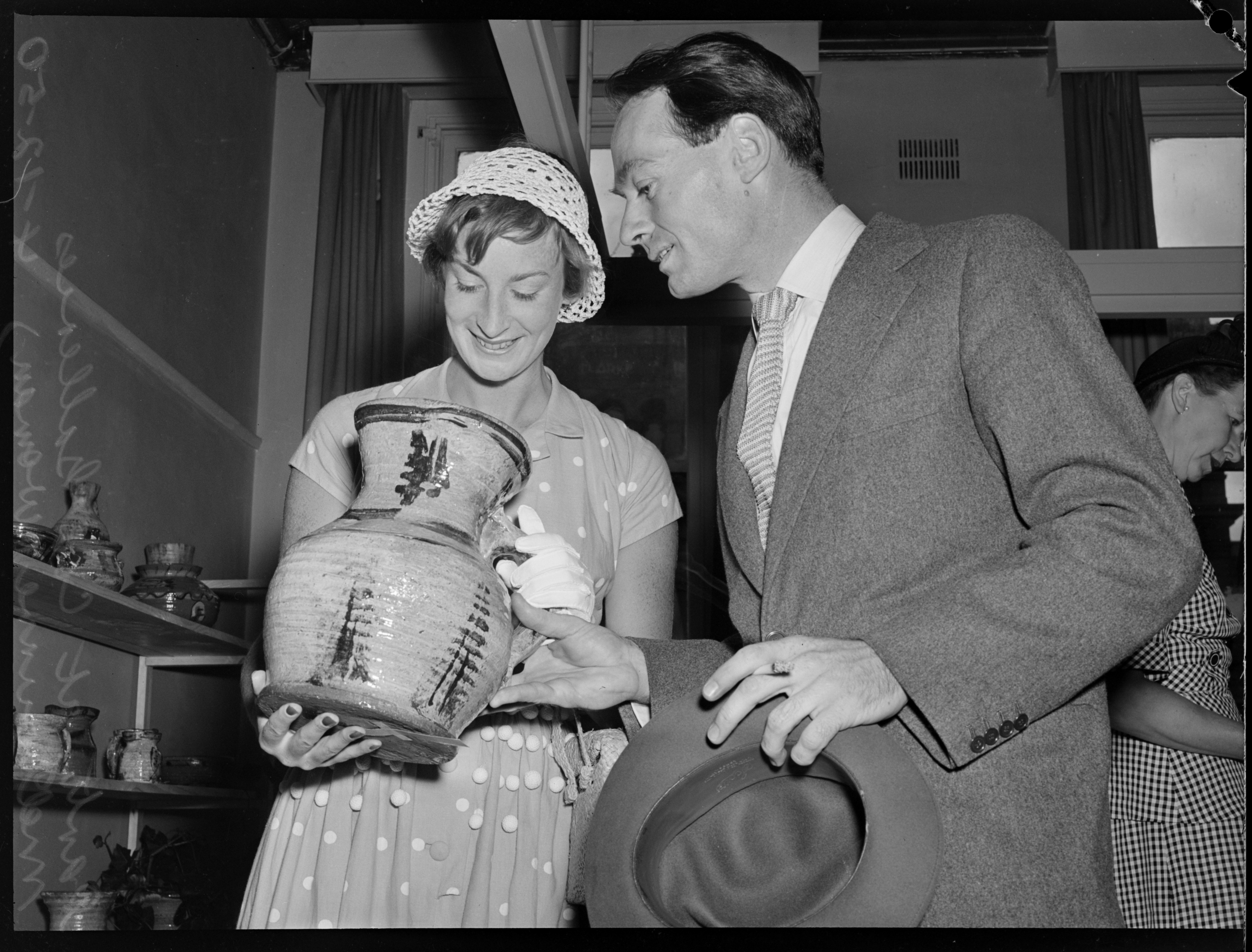

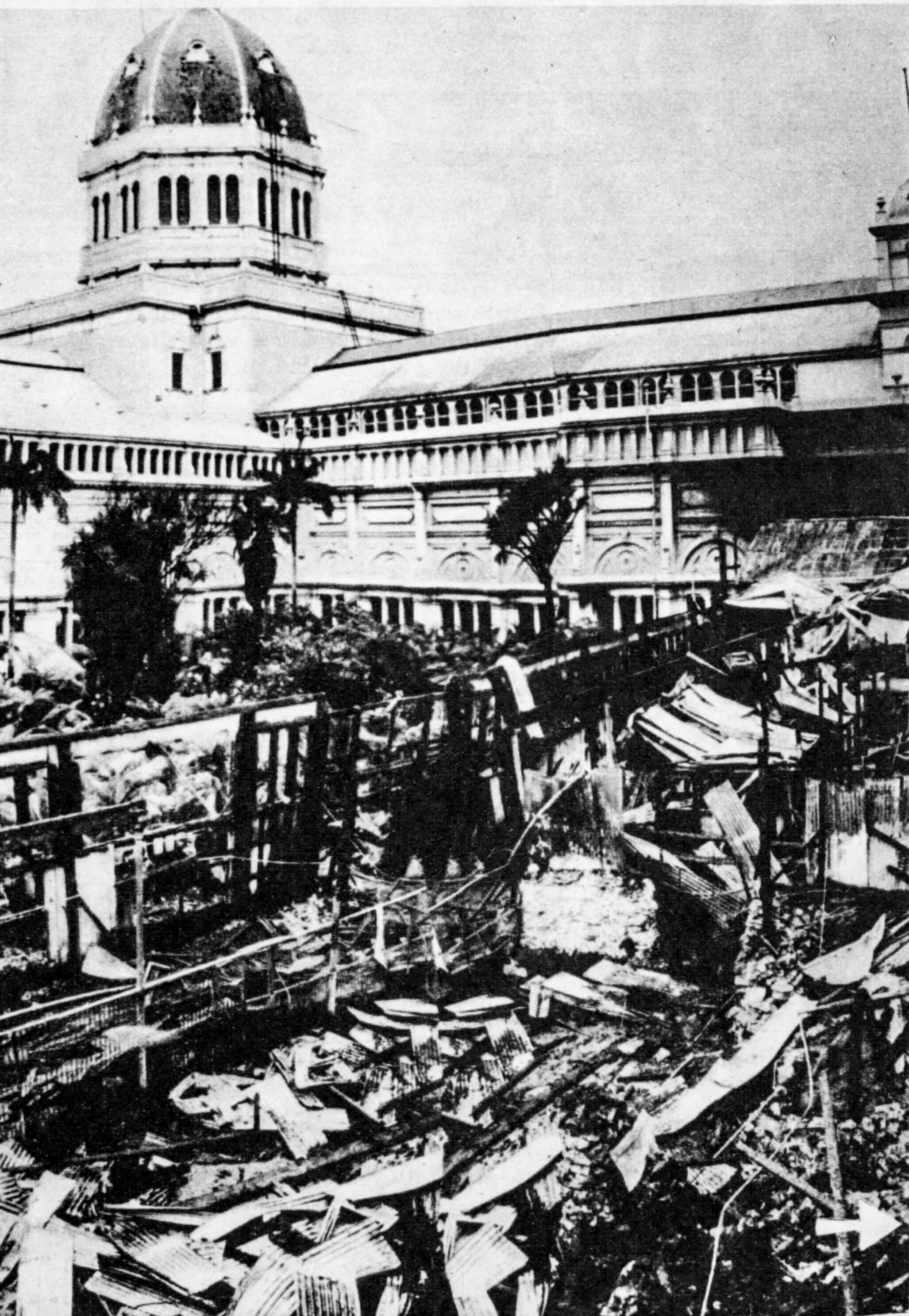
