= Aileen Britton =

Australian actress (1916–1986)

- Born: 18 February 1916; Inverell, New South Wales, Australia
- Died: 19 April 1986 (aged 70); Sydney, Australia
- Occupation: Actress
- Years active: 1937–1986

Aileen Britton (18 February 1916 in Sydney – 19 April 1986) credited also as Aileen Britain, was an Australian character actress of theatre, radio, television, and film (TV movie and theatrical), with a career in the industry spanning nearly 50 years.

Britton made her debut in a film Tall Timbers in 1937, a performance called "heartbreakin". She then worked primarily exclusively in theatre roles and having been signed with the Independent Theatre

Britton post-theatre was a staple of the small screen, where she usually played quirky elderly ladies, mothers and grandmothers, in TV series'. Her television credits include Number 96 Matlock Police, The Restless Years, The Sullivans, Prisoner, and A Country Practice.

== Filmography ==
=== Film ===
Year	Title	Role	Type
1937	Tall Timbers	Claire Darley	Feature film
1942	100,000 Cobbers	Miss Lane	Film short
1958	An Enemy of the People	Kate Stockman	Teleplay
1959	The Skin of Our Teeth	Mrs Antrobus / Mrs Everyman	Teleplay
1975	The Tichborne Affair	Mrs. Skinner	TV film
1977	Born to Run (aka Harness Fever)	Susannah	Feature film
1977	The Death Train	Barmaid / Hotel Desk Clerk	TV film
1977	Ballantyne's Mission		TV film
1978	She'll Be Sweet (aka 'Magee and the Lady')	Mrs. Avery	TV film
1979	My Brilliant Career	Grandma Bossier	Feature film
1982	Fluteman	Beatrice Peachley	Feature film
1982	The Mystery at Castle House	Miss Markham	Feature film
1982	Now and Forever	Bethanie	Feature film
1983	Platypus Cove	Grandma Mason	TV film
1985	Don't Call Me Girlie	Herself	Documentary film short
1987	The Place at the Coast	Gran	Feature film

=== Television ===
Year	Title	Role	Type
1957	The Adventures of Long John Silver	Conseulla	TV series, 1 episode
	That's My Desire		TV series
1960	Probation Officer	Mrs. Andrews	TV series, 1 episode
1962	Call Oxbridge 2000	Mrs. Bennett	TV series, 11 episodes
1963	24-Hour Call	Mrs. Bennett	TV series, 4 episodes
1964	The Purple Jacaranda	Housekeeper	TV series
1966	Australian Playhouse	Mrs. Plum	TV series, 1 episode
1967	Homicide	Mrs. Townley	TV series, 1 episode
1968–69	I've Married A Bachelor	Mrs. Malley	TV series, 14 episodes
1972	Redheap	Mrs. Piper	TV series, 3 episodes
1973	Serpent in the Rainbow		TV series
1973	Boney	Nora	TV series, 1 episode
1973	Seven Little Australians	Mrs. Gormiston	TV miniseries, 1 episode
1974	Behind the Legend	Lady Mitchell	TV series, 1 episode: "Thomas Mitchell"
1975	Number 96	Mrs. Florentine	TV series, 12 episodes
1975; 1976	Matlock Police	Mrs. Gates / Nan Skuhorp	TV series, 2 episodes
1976	The Lost Islands	Widow Martha Quack	TV series, 1 episode
1976	Solo One	Aunt Nan	TV series, 9 episodes
1977	The Sullivans	Mrs. Skinner	TV series, 4 episodes
1977	Glenview High	Mrs. Greer	TV series, episode 5: "The Cheat"
1977	Young Ramsay	Mrs. Anderson	TV series, episode 9: "All Things Bright and Beautiful"
1979	The Restless Years	Kath Campbell	TV series, 4 episodes
1980	Arcade	Joyce Blair	TV series, 35 episodes
1981; 1985	Prisoner	Mrs. Hartley / Florence Marne	TV series, 8 episodes
1981; 1983; 1985	A Country Practice	Emily Page / Evelyn Cuthrie / Aunt Daphne	TV series, 7 episodes
1983	Carson's Law	Lillian Brewster	TV series
1986	Cyclone Tracy	Big Caroline	TV miniseries, 3 episodes
