= That's My Desire (TV series) =

- Genre: Panel show
- Presented by: Danny Webb
- Country of origin: Australia
- Original language: English

Production
- Running time: 30 minutes

Original release
- Network: HSV-7
- Release: 1958 – 1960

That's My Desire is an Australian television game show which ran from 1958 to 1960 on Melbourne station HSV-7. Hosted by Danny Webb, it was a panel game. The half-hour series changed time-slot several times. At one point it aired at 4:45PM, it later aired at 3:00PM, then at 4:00PM, and finally at 2:30PM.

In the episode aired 28 September 1959, the guests included Guy Doleman, Diana Davidson, John Grey and Aileen Britton, while the panel consisted of Bambi Smith, John Frith, Jocelyn Terry and Hugh Wills. Barry Humphries appeared in an episode aired 4 October 1962.

There is no information available as to whether any of the episodes exist as kinescope recordings. Game shows were generally considered disposable by Australian broadcasters in the 1950s and 1960s. Reportedly no kinescopes or video-tapes exist of HSV-7's version of Tell the Truth, while footage does exist of Lady for a Day, making it difficult to know for certain whether anything remains of That's My Desire.
