= Hans Hasenpflug =

German-born Australian photographer (1907–1977)

- Born: 1907; Mainz, Germany
- Died: 1977 (age 70)
- Occupation: Photographer

Hans Hasenpflug (1907–1977) was born in Germany and migrated to Australia where he became a portrait and fashion photographer and was naturalised.

== Biography ==
Hans Hasenpflug was born in Germany in 1907 where he was trained as a clerk for an exporting firm in the Munsterlager. He migrated to Sydney in 1927 and was a salesman in a firm similar to the one in Germany. Unlike other important German photographer migrants to Australia he is likely only to have become interested in photography after his arrival, around the time he was working with Leica Photo Service in 1932 in their processing lab. Throughout 1935–1937, he worked in the studio of fashion photographer Russell Roberts (1904–99) which launched his professional career as a photographer.

== Photography/career ==
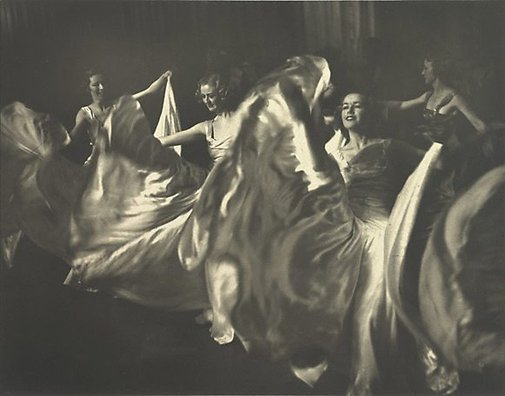
Hans Hasenpflug, Rhapsody in satin, 1937

Hasenpflug was self-taught and specialised in glamour, fashion and product advertising, with some portraiture, including one of painter Hans Heysen. Success in his career was marked by his imagery being taken up by The Sydney Morning Herald Women's Supplement and Table Talk. Hasenpflug mirrored the approach taken by Hungarian Martin Munkácsi who in the 1920s brought spontaneity to his fashion shots shot on location such as his Beach!, (1930, Hungarian Museum of Photography) which uses a similarly high angle of view as Hasenpflug's 1937 fashion shot taken from above a wharf (below, in the Art Gallery of New South Wales ).

Hasenpflug's photographs were displayed in the portrait, commercial and pictorial segments of the 1938 150th Anniversary Salon held in celebration of the colonisation of Australia. One of his better known works is in soft focus; a child leaning over a balustrade, praised as a representation of "modern" photography and as "an outstanding study of light and shade".

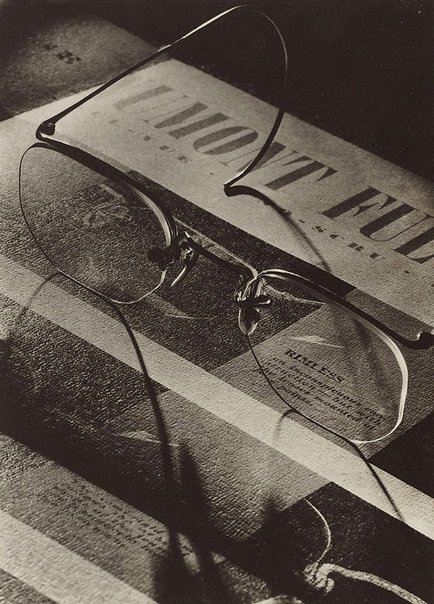
Hans Hasenpflug, Glasses, 1947

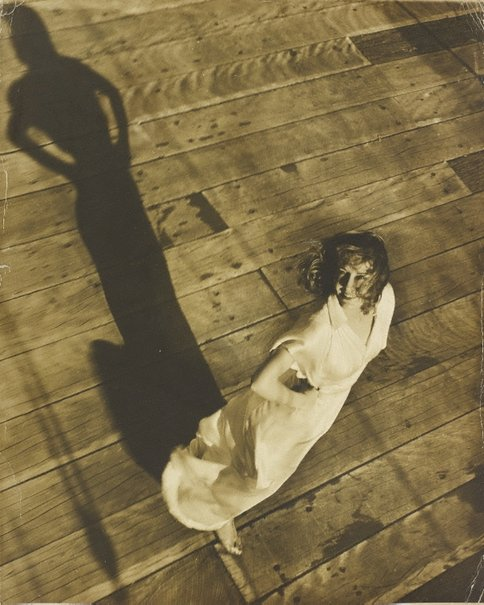
Untitled (Girl on wharf, fashion shot), Hans Hasenpflug, 1937

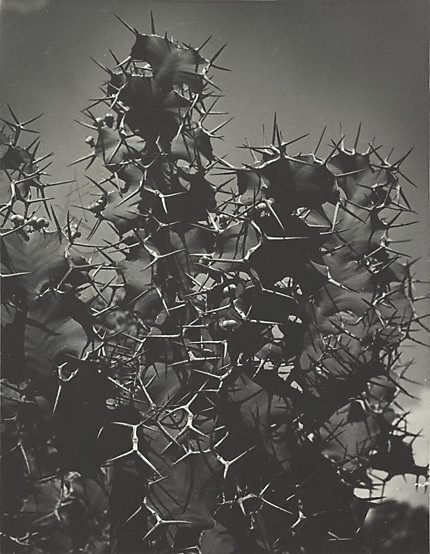
Cactus, Hans Hasenpflug, 1947

At the time of the 150th Anniversary Salon, Hasenpflug worked briefly in Melbourne for Athol Shmith's studio in Collins Street. From 1942 to 1945, he moved to the commercial studio of Austin-Murcott and Ritter-Jespersen.

In the 1940s, Hasenpflug began developing an industrial clientele but the field was off limits to him as an 'enemy alien' during the war and he had to transition to child portraiture. At the end of the war, Hans was made a citizen in Australia. In the 1950s, he was a printer at Latrobe Studios with Bruno Benini whose entry into fashion he encouraged. Henry Talbot replaced him there when he moved back to Sydney to open his own commercial illustration studio in Drury Lane in Mosman.

Before he fell ill and ended his career, he worked for Myer department store, specialising in product advertising.
