= About Your Garden =

- Genre: Lifestyle
- Presented by: Martha Gardener
- Country of origin: Australia
- Original language: English

Production
- Running time: 15 minutes

Original release
- Network: HSV-7
- Release: 31 July 1959 – 11 March 1960

About Your Garden is an Australian television series that aired from 31 July 1959 to 11 March 1960 on Melbourne station HSV-7. A series about gardening, it was hosted by Martha Gardener, who provided hints on gardening. A 15-minute series, it replaced Green Fingers on the HSV-7 schedule. The series is fairly obscure, and most of what is known about the series comes from old TV listings.

During the 1950s, most Australian series were aired in a single city only, which was also the case with About Your Garden. It is not known if the series was live or kinescoped in advance (HSV-7 likely did not have video-tape equipment at the time). Information on the archival status of the series is not available.

Gardener's other works included an early 1950s radio series on station 3AW called Martha Gardener Recommends.
