= My Fair Lady (1958 TV series) =

- Genre: Makeover
- Starring: Charles Bush; Ray Leighton
- Country of origin: Australia
- Original language: English

Original release
- Network: HSV-7, ADS-7, TCN-9
- Release: 1958 – 1964

My Fair Lady was an Australian television series which aired from 1958 through to the sixties on multiple television stations.

The show featured a female compere and a male fashion critic. There would be three or four housewives as contestants and the critic would analyse their looks, commenting on clothes and figure. One would be chosen as My Fair Lady, would be rewarded with a makeover and a wardrobe and would reappear the next week to present her new look.

In Melbourne it aired on HSV-7 and starred Charles Bush (from 1958-62) as the critic with multiple comperes during the years, starting with Bambi Smith and including June Finlayson, Vikki Hammond, and Gretta Miers. It finished up in May 1962. The Adelaide version aired on ADS-7 and also featured Bush and the comperes included Maree Tomasetti, Heather Duncan, Mary McMahon and Yvonne Woods. In Sydney it aired on TCN-9 and saw Ray Leighton in the critic role with comperes including Elaine White.

In Melbourne it was originally part of a line-up titled Home, which featuring various segments including Cooking, Home Decorator and Shopping Guide. Later, it appears the Home branding was dropped. For part of its run it aired at 2:30PM. At one point in 1959 it was the first show on the station schedule for the day (this was prior to Australian television being a 24-hour service), while at another point in 1959 it was preceded by US anthology series episodes of shows like Four Star Playhouse.

Archival status is unknown, but as Australian game shows (and daytime series in general) were rarely kept during the era the show aired in, it is likely the series is either lost or largely missing.

In his obituary of Bush, Michael Shmith described the show as "television at its most sexist".
