= Athol Shmith =

Australian photographer (1914–1990)

Athol Shmith AM
- Born: Louis Athol Shmith; 19 August 1914; Melbourne, Australia
- Died: 21 October 1990 (aged 76)
- Known for: Photography
- Spouses: Yvonne Pearl Slater (m. 1939; div. 1948); Patricia Tuckwell (m. 1948; div. 1958); Paule Grant Hay (m. 1967)
- Children: Michael Shmith

Louis Athol Shmith AM, FRPS, (19 August 1914 – 21 October 1990) was an Australian studio portrait and fashion photographer and photography educator in his home city of Melbourne, Australia. He contributed to the promotion of international photography within Australia as much as to the fostering of Australian photography in the world scene.

== Early life ==
Shmith was born in Melbourne in 1914 into a comfortable and cultured middle-class family, the youngest of three, after Verna and Clive, of Harry Wolf Shmith, an analytical chemist associated with Mr. George. R. Nicholas in the formulation of aspirin for mass production, and an accomplished pianist, and his wife Genetta, née Epstein, both born in England. When he celebrated his 21st birthday, Shmith's family lived at 'Grasmere' 181 Barkly Street, St Kilda. Shmith played piano and vibraphone and considered music as a possible career.

== Professional photographer ==
Shmith's father gave him a camera as a teenager and what was a hobby became a profession in his late teens when Shmith, who had an interest in theatre and played at charity performances, including acts with the 'Youth and Laughter Revue', was asked to take the publicity photographs and stills for a show. He saw there was a career in his former hobby and, for the first five years he specialised in theatre work and society and wedding portraits through which he first made his reputation. He exhibited his works in photographic salons at home and abroad. At age 17 his work, among 7,000 international entries was awarded a bronze plaque in the Colonial and Overseas photographic Exhibition, and shown in the Royal Photographic Society’s salon in London. In early 1933 and supported by his family, he established a studio in 'The Warwick', newly built by Joseph Plottel, at 75A Fltzroy Street, cnr. Jackson Street, St Kilda and in May that year his portrait of John Atkinson, an Australian Air Force pilot, was exhibited as the only Australian entry in the International Salon of Photography, Chicago.

Shmith's professional break had come in the early 1930s when he gained the contract to take portraits of visiting celebrities for the newly formed Australian Broadcasting Commission. Shmith's work expanded to include a range of commercial advertising and illustration and appeared in local society magazines including Table Talk, with cover images by 1934, by which time he was starting to concentrate on fashion, and had joined the social set himself, with his family holidays being reported in newspapers. At the age of just 19 he was appointed Vice-Regal Photographer in Melbourne, and was contracted for stage and publicity photography by theatre producer J.C. Williamson Limited.

When in 1936 he showed with Julian Smith and Spencer Shier in the annual exhibition of the Victorian salon of photography at the Athenaeum Galleries, modernist artist and Sun newspaper critic George Bell praised Shmith's "delicate tonal nuance in Nude in Repose," and a pictorial report in The Australasian featured his Technical Inspection from the same show. He exhibited in October at the Kodak gallery, when Harold Herbert of The Argus noted that "Mr. Athol Shmith is original in Nude In Repose. That year he was advertising as a Fellow of the Royal Society of Arts (FRSA), had secured the Myer Emporium as a fashion client, and The Argus ran a congratulatory article on his overseas successes at "only 22 years"; in Boston's American Annual competition; the Chicago Century of Progress Fair; receiving a request from Arnold Glngrlch, founder of Esquire for examples of his work; and as the subject of a special article in the French art magazine La Revue Moderne. He won prizes in Yugoslavia and Vienna, then in 1937 exhibited at the Cape Town and Dublin international salon, and in June it was reported that he had been made an Associate of the British Royal Photographic Society. By the late mid-1930s, he was seen as representing a new modern style of work, and to meet demand, he employed other photographers including Hans Hasenpflug in 1937. Shmith was active in the Melbourne Camera Club from 1938, for whose members he held demonstrations in his studio.

== Collins Street studio ==
After the death of his father in November 1938, in 1939 Shmith, then merely twenty-five years of age, became a Fellow of the Royal Photographic Society and moved his business to a studio in the Rue de la Paix building at 125 Collins Street, run with the assistance of his brother Clive, and sister, Verna, who was his receptionist and who became an expert negative retoucher. The studio had originally been fitted out for Helena Rubenstein, and retained her elegant powder blue and deep pink fittings.

Influenced in his early career by the soft Pictorialist style of turn-of-the-century art photographers and, as Newton notes, contemporaries May and Mina Moore, Shmith later embraced the clearer light, bolder compositions and design emphasis of art deco modernism which he admired in the fashion, product and portrait work of (Sir) Cecil Beaton, Edward Steichen and Hollywood portraitist George Hurrell. He exhibited again with the Victorian Salon of Photography at the Athenaeum in August 1939.

== War years ==
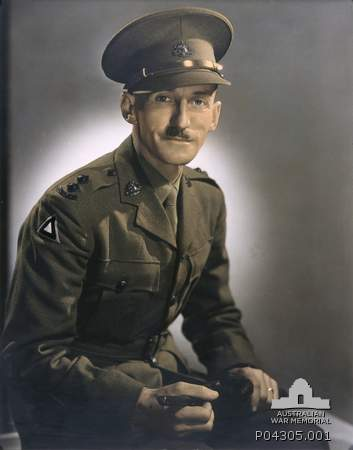
Lt Hamilton Lamb MLA photographed by Athol Shmith; a portrait typical of those he produced of service personnel during WW2

The outbreak of the Second World War interrupted the studio work Shmith had just commenced after his move into the city. When he attempted to enlist, he failed the medical examination, but he conducted photographic analyses for the army, including the interpretation of aerials of the American landing in Italy, and made donations to The Australian Comforts Fund. His studio produced portrait photographs of hundreds of servicewomen and men, including those of many Americans on leave in Melbourne.

Shmith was represented internationally by the Pix agency which brought his work to the cover of LIFE magazine of 3 August 1942; his portrait of the son of General MacArthur who was in the country with his family at the time. Inside were several of his pictures illustrating a story on the general's pretty wife and his son whiling away a Melbourne winter, while for a previous issue, 27 July 1942, Shmith had provided a photograph of MacArthur's air commander Lieutenant General George H. Brett playing cribbage (with 'U.S.A. cards' and matches, emphasises the caption) in a Melbourne restaurant with Brigadier General Ralph Boyce.

== The 'New Look' ==
After World War II Shmith embraced the "New Look" and the spirit of post-war recovery in fashion illustration, becoming the most respected professional in the field in Australia. In 1947 he represented Melbourne among the fifteen mostly Sydney professionals who exhibited when the Institute of Photographic Illustrators, formed in 1947, had its first show in 1949, and to counter a perceived Sydney bias, Max Dupain later urged him, Dacre Stubbs, Helmut Newton, Norman Ikin and Wolfgang Sievers to form the institute's Melbourne chapter.

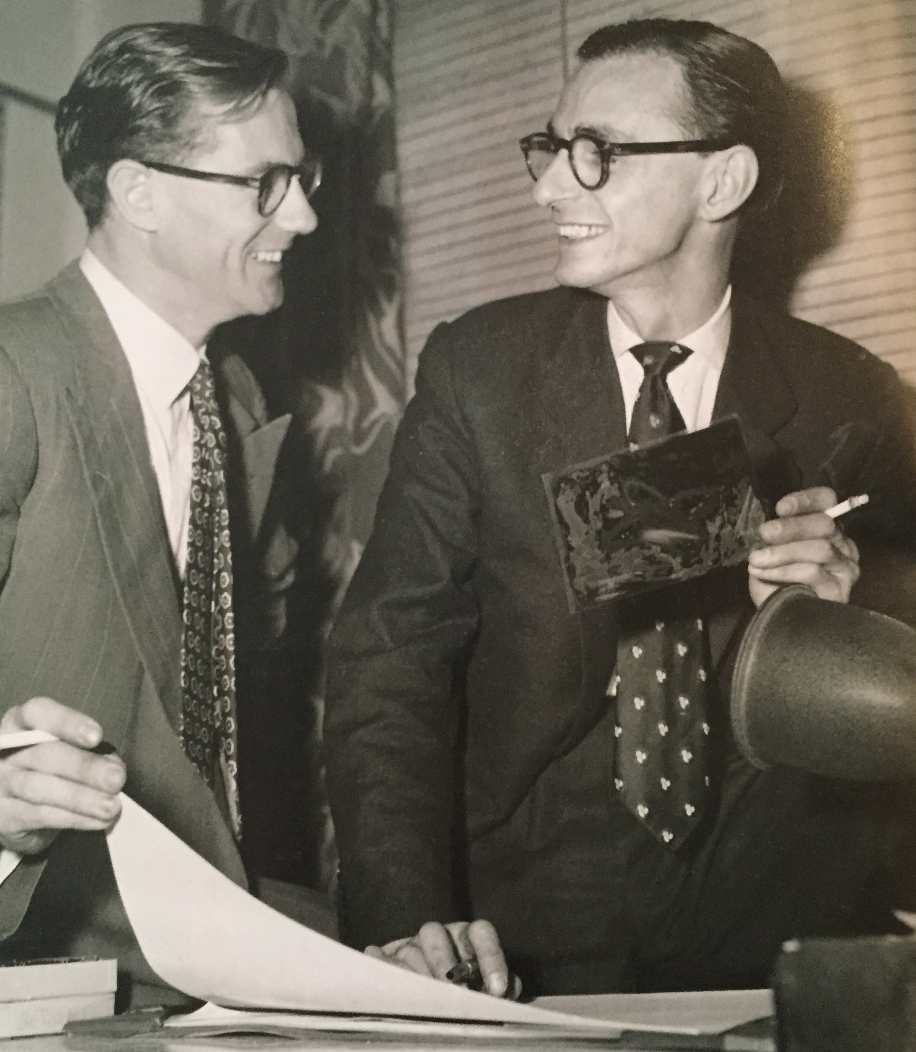
Business partners John Cato and Athol Shmith, 1955. Photographer unknown.

His studio was increasingly associated with zestful, creative fashion photography, and Shmith, who prided himself on his skill in lighting, had learned much from the model of European modernism and the quirkiness of surrealism. He was also indebted to the top-lit and back-lit glowing 'Hollywood lighting' style of portraiture popularised by Californian photographer George Hurrell in the 1920s and 1930s. He described his portrait of actress Vivien Leigh in costume as lit by his 'inky dinky light', a top spotlight diffused by tracing paper. Shmith treated his female sitters and models as princesses. In 1950 John Cato, the son of Jack Cato became co-director of Shmith's studio, who recalled that Shmith;

...was a man of enormous enthusiasms. He was childlike because he always embraced new things - novelty was tremendously important to him. Even when he was in his 70s, he always wanted the latest camera or lens. His lighting techniques were theatrical. He used Hollywood spotlights when the generation before him used floodlights. He was theatrical - an urbane, debonair guy with this enormous magnetism but was enormously insecure underneath.

From the 1960s Shmith responded to cultural shifts with a freeing-up of the style and setting of his fashion photographs. He moved from the studio into everyday environments, like the street and beach. Shmith acknowledged as his inspiration during this period the work of Richard Avedon.

== Contributions to photography in Australia ==
Athol Shmith's commercial career produced photographs that embodied a world of grace, glamour and allure and his dramatic portraits remain a record of significant personalities of his era.

His technical expertise was also considerable; in 1945, he co-developed and patented (application 1947, granted 1950) a photo-finish racecourse camera invented by his friend, Melbourne scientist Bertram Alston Pearl; the 'Camera Graph' continuous-flow film system, with the innovation of a neon lamp in the finish-post, the oscillations of which record a time-register on the image. Smith was responsible for devising a rapid film processing method that would cut the time to 65 seconds, enabling course officials to announce a result moments after the running of the race. The system was first officially used on 6 July 1946 and adopted throughout Australia.

Throughout the 1960s Shmith remained energetic and dynamic in his development of fashion work, but by the close of the decade he took on roles in photographic heritage and education. Shmith was a member, and later, president, of the Institute of Victorian Photographers. In 1968 he was made an honorary life member of the Institute of Australian Photographers. In the same year he was instrumental as an appointed member, with gallery director Eric Westbrook, Dacre Stubbs and Albert Brown, of the advisory panel, in founding the photographic department at the National Gallery of Victoria, the first in Australia, and among the first at public galleries worldwide. Jennie Boddington was appointed as its first curator and she commissioned Shmith, as NGV council member (1972–75), to travel to Britain and France in 1973, to acquire international photographs for the collection. As a consequence, in 1975 he established a fruitful partnership between the gallery and the Bibliothèque Nationale de France which led to numbers of Australian photographers' work entering their collection.

== Photographic educator ==
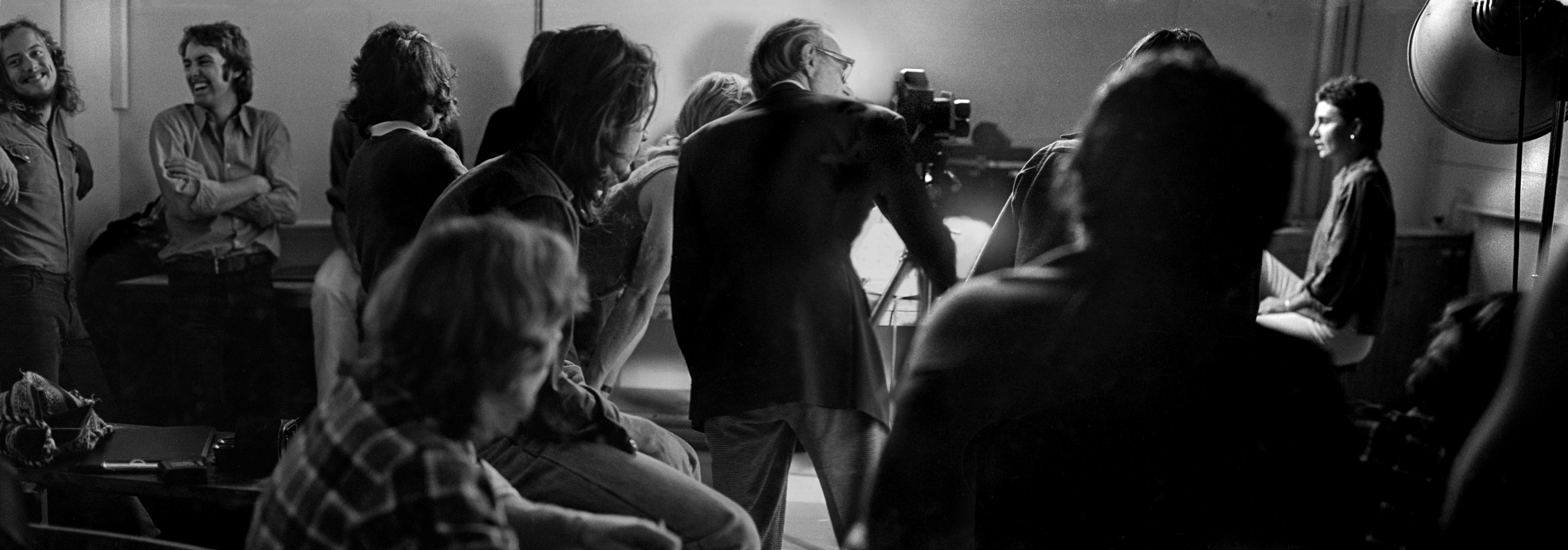
Athol Shmith demonstrates lighting techniques to a second year photography class at Prahran College of Advanced Education in 1975.

In 1971 Shmith left his studio to take on a new role as head of the Photography Department at Prahran College of Advanced Education, replacing Gordon De'Lisle. He taught there with his business partner John Cato and the film-maker Paul Cox with whom he exhibited at the Australian Centre for Photography in 1977. While teaching he produced and exhibited his 1973 psychedelic 'Anamorphic Series' now held in the collection of the National Gallery of Australia.

Shmith's support assisted the careers of students whom he closely mentored such as Bill Henson, Carol Jerrems, Rod McNicol, Phil Quirk, Andrew Chapman and Christopher Koller. A brain tumour forced his retirement from the college in 1979, but after surgery and recovery he continued with a limited professional practice, including documenting the 1980 opening of the High Court of Australia building.

== Legacy ==
Shmith's work was collected by the major art museums commencing in the 1970s and he had a retrospective in 1977 at the Australian Centre for Photography. In 1989 the National Gallery of Victoria held an Athol Shmith survey. The major holdings of his work can be found in the National Gallery of Victoria and the National Gallery of Australia. A small monograph on his work was published in 1980.

Shmith was appointed a Member of the Order of Australia on 8 June 1981 "in recognition of service to photography".

A more substantial catalogue was written by curator Isobel Crombie and published in association with Shmith's major retrospective at the NGV in 1989.

Posthumously, the NGV showed his work in 1996 in their photography gallery. A National Gallery of Australia Travelling Exhibition comparing Shmith and Yousef Karsh was held at the Monash Gallery of Art, Wheelers Hill, Victoria, 7 February–30 March 2003, and 5 other venues to March 2004, included a catalogue. The Paris End: Photography, Fashion and Glamour at the NGV 3 June – 1 October 2006 included Shmith's photographs along with those of Jack Cato, Mina Moore, Ruth Hollick, Wolfgang Sievers, Helmut Newton and Henry Talbot and was accompanied by a substantial publication by NGV Curator of Photography Susan van Wyck.

== Personal life ==
Athol Shmith was said to be urbane, charming and witty and also madcap and less concerned with the gravitas of his many celebrity sitters as moral exemplars, his pictures instead celebrating their elan, style and creative spirit. He's described as being fascinated with his subjects rather than in awe of them, and married three of his fashion models subjects.

On 9 November 1939, Shmith married Yvonne Pearl Slater. The couple divorced in 1948.

From 1948 to 1958, he was married to fashion model 'Bambi' (Patricia Tuckwell, sister of Barry Tuckwell and future wife of Lord Harewood, 1st cousin to Queen Elizabeth II). They were married on 7 July 1948 in Melbourne. Their son Michael Shmith, a senior writer with The Age newspaper, now retired, was born on the first anniversary of their marriage, 7 July 1949, and his son Sam follows in his grandfather's footsteps as a photographer. The couple divorced in 1958.

Shmith's third wife was divorcée Paule Grant Hay (née Paulus), a former mannequin for Christian Dior in Paris. They married in 1967.

== Selected exhibitions ==
- 1933: Royal Photographic Society Salon, London
- 1936, April: Victorian Salon of Photography. Athenaeum Galleries
- 1936, October: Group show. Kodak gallery, Melbourne
- 1936: American Annual competition Boston
- 1936: Chicago Century of Progress Fair
- 1937: Cape Town and Dublin international salons
- 1939, 7–18 August: Victorian Salon of Photography exhibition. Athenaeum Gallery
- 1977: Retrospective Australian Centre for Photography
- 1989/90, 21 October–25 February: Athol Shmith Fashion Photography from the 1940s to the 1970s. NGV International, Photography Gallery. National Gallery of Victoria
