= Tote Sport Radio =

Former sport radio station in Tasmania, Australia

Tote Sport Radio (7TAB)

Australia
- Broadcast area: Tasmania
- Frequency: See below

Programming
- Format: Racing and sport

Ownership
- Owner: Tote Tasmania

Tote Sport Radio Was owned by Tote Tasmania. It was included in the sale of Tote Tasmania to Tatts Group that was completed on March 26, 2012, and as a result, the radio network was integrated into RadioTAB in the early hours of March 27, 2012.

Following the merger of Tatts Group, which operated RadioTAB for its jurisdictions (its wagering services then styled UBET), with fellow wagering and gaming operator Tabcorp, RadioTAB is now a sister station to Sydney-based Sky Sports Radio. Both stations have retained their separate identities as of 2021. However, RSN 927am Melbourne is heard Monday to Friday from 6 am to 1 pm, before reverting back to RadioTAB for the Tasmanian market.

== History ==
Following the Tasmanian TAB's purchase of 7HT 1080 am in Hobart and 7EX 1008 am in Launceston, 7TAB commenced statewide broadcasting at 4:00 p.m. on January 8, 1993.

It later became Tote Sport Radio following a rebrand of the Tasmanian TAB.

Tote Sport Radio broadcasts were largely a relay of RSN Racing & Sport in Melbourne, although the John Laws Morning Showsyndicated programming was broadcast on the Launceston frequency. Tote Sport Radio broadcast live commentary of thoroughbred, harness and greyhound racing along with race form and betting information. Other sports were also covered in breakfast and weekend programming.

Some of the locally produced flagship programs included Tasmanian Turf Talk, the Harness Racing Show, the Greyhound Show, Tassie Footy Show, and various locally produced segments during the RSN Big Sports Breakfast.

Now the station broadcasts a mix of RSN and RadioTAB programming into the state.

== Frequencies ==
- Hobart – 1080 AM
- Launceston – 1008 AM
- Burnie – 97.7 FM
- Devonport – 101.3 FM
- Carrick - 87.6 FM
- Bicheno - 87.6 FM
- Queenstown - 87.6 FM
- Rosebery - 87.6 FM
- Scottsdale - 87.6 FM
- Strahan - 87.6 FM
- St Helens - 87.6 FM
- St Marys - 87.6 FM
- Smithton - 87.6 FM
- Zeehan - 87.6 FM
