= Green Fingers (TV series) =

- Genre: Lifestyle
- Presented by: John Sunnyman; Danny Webb
- Country of origin: Australia
- Original language: English
- No. of seasons: 2

Production
- Running time: 5 minutes (Season 1); 15 minutes (Season 2)

Original release
- Network: HSV-7
- Release: 22 March 1957 – 24 July 1959

Related
- About Your Garden (1959-1960)

Green Fingers is an early Australian television series, which aired for two seasons on Melbourne station HSV-7. Much of what is known about the series comes from old television listings. As the title suggests, it was a gardening series. The first season aired from 22 March 1957 to 3 January 1958, with its hosts being unknown. The second season aired from 29 August 1958 to 24 July 1959. Television listings in The Age list the cast as being John Sunnyman and Danny Webb. During its first season, it was a five-minute series aired before HSV-7's newscast, but the second season aired as a fifteen-minute series in daytime. Both seasons aired on Fridays.

The series was replaced with/became About Your Garden, which aired from 31 July 1959 to 11 March 1960, and was hosted by Martha Gardener.
