= Jack Little (broadcaster) =

American-born Australian commentator and presenter

- Born: Jack Hiram Little; 16 December 1908; Missoula, Montana, United States
- Died: 4 January 1986 (aged 77); Upper Ferntree Gully, Victoria, Australia
- Occupations: Radio sports broadcaster, sports promoter, radio quiz master, television broadcaster, television sports broadcaster, stage actor, defence force personnel
- Years active: 1931–1978
- Spouses: Ann Oman (1935– ) divorce; Patricia McNamara (17 September 1942 – 1959) divorce; Patricia Dolores Anderson (Patti Raye) (12 December 1967 – 4 January 1986) his death

Jack Hiram Little (20 December 1908 – 4 January 1986) was an American-born Australian media personality, including as a television commentator for GTV-9's broadcasts of the World Championship Wrestling between 1964 through to 1978.

== Biography ==
Jack Hiram Little was born on 20 December 1908 in Missoula, Montana the second child of John Herman Little (a salesman and amateur vaudeville performer) and Edna Jane née Fife (a teacher). In 1931 Little worked for KJR, an all-sports radio station based in Seattle, Washington, where, in February 1932, he commentated his first professional wrestling show from Everett. During World War II he served in the United States Army, following which he moved to Hollywood, where he worked for KPOL sports radio station, announcing televised wrestling matches from the Hollywood Legion Stadium.

In 1952 Little moved to Australia, with his second wife, Patricia McNamara, and their family, working as a radio compere for Melbourne station, 3DB, where he hosted his own shows, including The Greys Game, Two For the Money and Magazine of the Air. In 1956 Little together with a number of other 3DB personnel moved to TV station, GTV-9, where he worked alongside Eric Pearce presenting the news.

He also performed and scripted sketches on In Melbourne Tonight (1957), hosted Personal Album (November 1958 – May 1959) and Taking It Easy (1960) as well as regular appearances on It Could Be You, (1961–69) alongside Tommy Hanlon Jr. Little also performed in a number of stage productions, including Tea and Sympathy (1956), the musical The Pajama Game (1957) and "Anniversary Waltz" (1958).

When GTV-9 purchased radio station 3AK in 1961, it required its personalities to also present radio programs. Little appeared with Tommy Hanlon Jr. on a 3AK Saturday morning program.

In 1957 Little brought film footage of US professional wrestling to Australia, where it was screened on HSV-7 as International Wrestling later becoming Ringside with the Rasslers. In 1960 GTV-9 began telecasts of wrestling from Melbourne Festival Hall, with Little providing the commentary.

In 1964 Little convinced US wrestling promoters, Jim Barnett and Johnny Doyle that it was viable to bring professional wrestling to Australia. Little had previously worked with Doyle in the US. On 23 October 1964 Barnett and Doyle presented the first match of the World Championship Wrestling at the Sydney Stadium. A headline making event was when a television match for the Australian championship between Killer Karl Kox and Spiros Arion was declared ended due to time limit by Little. Kox responded by applying a wrestling manoeuvre, 'Brain Buster', to Little, who was hospitalised and called matches over the following month while wearing a neck brace. Little's memorable catchphrases included "Wham! Bam! Thank you Mam!", "All I can say is – Wow!", "Be There!" and "That's all there is, there isn't any more!". In 1978 Little retired from broadcasting although he continued to be associated with the sport into the 1980s.

During 1985 Andrew Duffield and Phil Kenihan produced a three-track extended play, Over the Ropes – A Tribute to Jack Little by The Forearm Jolt, which used a compilation of commentaries by Little and his co-host, Paul Jennings, from their program, World Championship Wrestling. The extended play was released as a tribute to the ailing Little. The Forearm Jolt were a studio ensemble with Duffield on keyboards; Mark Ferrie on bass guitar; James Valentine on saxophone; twins sisters Sherine and Zan Abeyratne on vocals; Rozzi Bazzani on vocals; John Fielding on trumpet; Noel Crombie on thumps and bumps; and Andrew Pendlebury on lead guitar. Lyrics were co-written by Duffield, Kenihan and news journalist, James Cockington.

== Personal life ==
In 1935 he married Ann Oman in Portland, Oregon, they had a daughter and were later divorced. On 17 September 1942 he married Patricia McNamara in Los Angeles (a divorced Australian office worker) and they moved to Australia in 1952. The couple had two daughters. In 1959 Little and Patricia divorced. On 12 December 1967 he married Patricia Dolores Anderson (known as Patti Raye), a singer-dancer.

In 1946 he acknowledged his alcoholism, joined Alcoholics Anonymous and maintained his sobriety as well as supporting others. Little died from a heart complaint at the William Angliss Hospital in Upper Ferntree Gully, Victoria, on 4 January 1986. He was survived by his third wife, the daughter of his first marriage and the two daughters of his second.
