= Ardath Hit Parade =

- Genre: Music television
- Presented by: Keith Walshe; Jimmy Parkinson
- Country of origin: Australia
- Original language: English

Original release
- Network: ATN-7
- Release: 1958 – 1959

Related
- Sydney Tonight

Ardath Hit Parade is an Australian television series which aired on Sydney station ATN-7 from 1958 to 1959. Originally hosted by Keith Walshe, it was later hosted by Jimmy Parkinson. It was a spin-off from Sydney Tonight, and had been a segment of that series prior to becoming a series of its own.

The series presented the top 10 songs of the week. Guest singers and groups appeared on the series from time to time.

It should not be confused with Melbourne-produced series Hit Parade (in which hit recordings were lip-synced by a recurring cast in sets and costumes), which was shown in Sydney on TCN-9. There was also another Hit Parade which aired on ABC.

An episode of this series may be held by the National Film and Sound Archive under the title Australia's Hit Parade.
