= Personal Album (TV series) =

- Genre: Talk show
- Presented by: Jack Little
- Country of origin: Australia
- Original language: English

Production
- Running time: 15 minutes; 30 minutes

Original release
- Network: GTV-9
- Release: 18 November 1958 – 12 May 1959

Personal Album was an Australian television series, which aired on Melbourne station GTV-9 on Tuesdays, from 18 November 1958 to 12 May 1959. Originally the programme ran for 15 minutes, it was later expanded to 30 minutes. The series was hosted by Jack Little, it was an interview series.

People interviewed by Little during the series included Noel Ferrier, Toni Lamond and Frank Sheldon, Bill McCormack and Happy Hammond.

It should not be confused with Personal Column, a HSV-7 series which also aired from 1958 to 1959.
