= Patricia Lascelles, Countess of Harewood =

Australian musician and model

The Right Honourable The Countess of Harewood
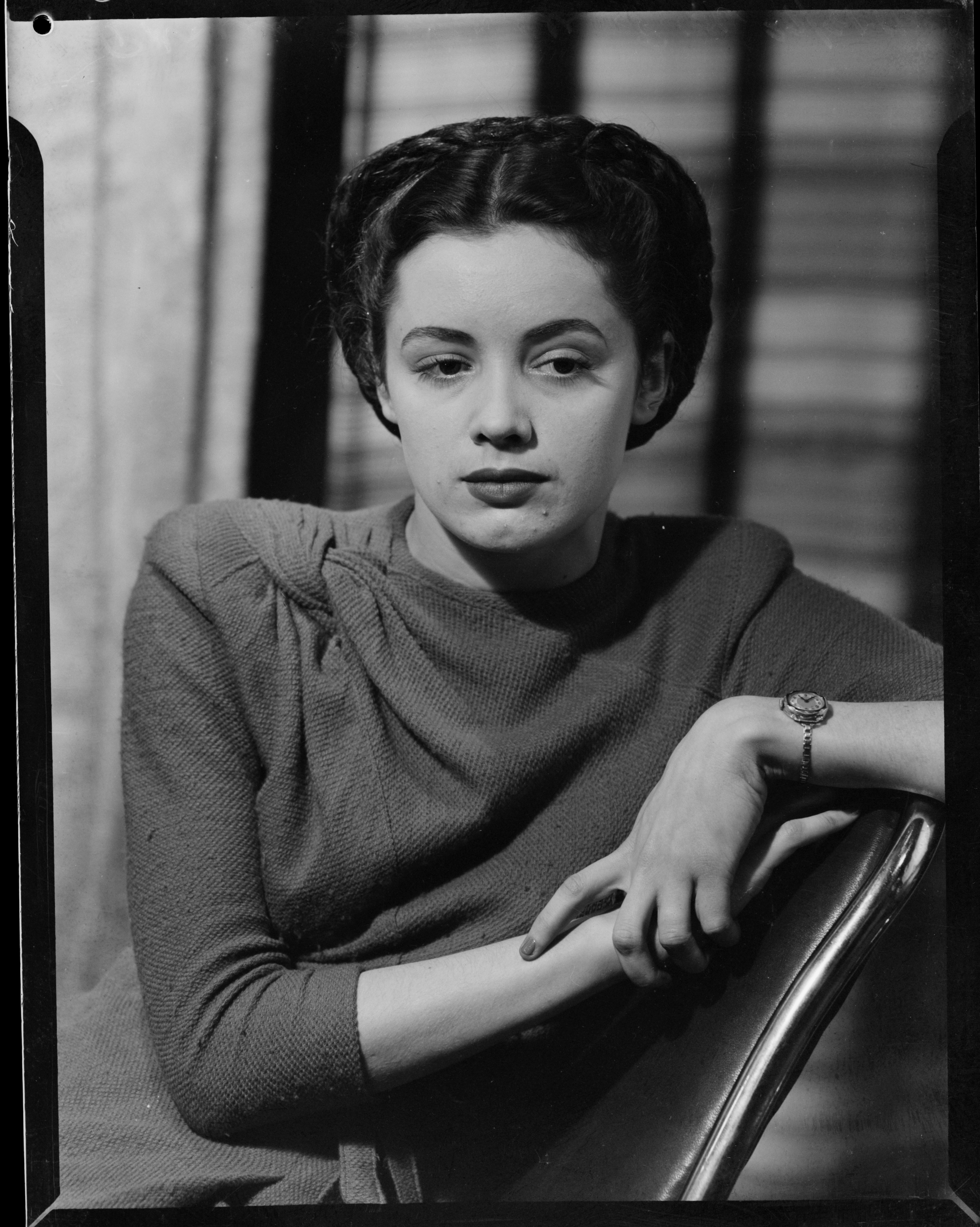

Personal details
- Born: Patricia Elizabeth Tuckwell; 24 November 1926 Melbourne, Victoria, Australia
- Died: 4 May 2018 (aged 91) Harewood House, Leeds, England
- Spouses: Athol Shmith (m. 1948; div. 1957) George Lascelles, 7th Earl of Harewood (m. 1967; died 2011)
- Children: Michael Shmith; Mark Lascelles
- Relatives: Barry Tuckwell (brother)
- Occupation: Violinist, former fashion model

Patricia Elizabeth Lascelles, Countess of Harewood (née Tuckwell, formerly Shmith; 24 November 1926 – 4 May 2018) was an Australian-British violinist and fashion model. She was the second wife of George Lascelles, 7th Earl of Harewood, eldest paternal first cousin of Queen Elizabeth II.

== Early life and career ==
Lascelles was born in Melbourne, the daughter of Charles Tuckwell, an organist, and his wife Elizabeth, and an older sister of Barry Tuckwell.

After being educated privately, she pursued a career in music as a violinist for the Sydney Symphony Orchestra.

She was also a fashion model and a favourite model of Athol Shmith, who became her first husband. While they were married, Patricia often modeled for him, under the name Bambi Smith. In 1951, she was one of the founders of the Mannequins' Association of Victoria. She ran the Bambi Smith Modelling College in Melbourne. Her alumnae include such notables as Roma Egan. After the opening of Melbourne's first television station, HSV-7, on 4 November 1956, she appeared on a number of early programs, including Beauty is My Business, in which her co-host was Mary Parker.

== Personal life ==
On 7 July 1948, Patricia married Athol Shmith in Melbourne, and they had one son, Michael (b. 1949), formerly a senior journalist for The Age 1981–2017. The couple divorced in 1957.

She later married George Lascelles, 7th Earl of Harewood, on 31 July 1967 at Waveny Park, New Canaan, Connecticut (USA), having been forced to marry outside the UK by the Royal Marriages Act 1772, then still in force. The couple had met in Italy in 1959. They had one son, Mark, who was born on 5 July 1964, while the Earl was still married to his first wife, Marion Stein. This event was a society scandal, and resulted in the earl and his second wife being ostracised by the royal family for some years, although the Queen had given her consent to the marriage.

== Countess of Harewood ==
As Countess of Harewood, Lascelles helped manage the family seat Harewood House in Yorkshire, developing it as a centre for bird conservation and expanding it as a visitor attraction.

She was patroness of the Huntington's Disease Association. She was club patron of Leeds United from 2011 until 2017 when she was named honorary president of the club; her late husband had been president of Leeds United from 1961 until his death.

The Countess died at Harewood House on 4 May 2018.
