= Canberra Report =

1959–1960 Australian television series

- Genre: Talk show
- Presented by: George Baker; Bob Sanders
- Country of origin: Australia
- Original language: English

Production
- Running time: 15 minutes

Original release
- Network: ATN-7
- Release: 1 November 1959 – 1960

Canberra Report is an Australian television series which aired 1959 to 1960 on Sydney station ATN-7. Originally hosted by George Baker, it was later hosted by Bob Sanders. The series debuted 1 November 1959.

The series featured interviews with people in the field of politics. It aired in a 15-minute time-slot.
