= The Happy Go Lucky Show =

- Genre: Variety show
- Presented by: Happy Hammond; Bob Horsfall
- Country of origin: Australia
- Original language: English

Original release
- Network: GTV-9
- Release: 30 October 1957 – 4 November 1959

The Happy Go Lucky Show is an Australian television variety series which aired from 30 October 1957 to 4 November 1959 on Melbourne television station GTV-9. Originally hosted by Happy Hammond, by 1958 the series was hosted by Bob Horsfall. Horsfall sometimes had a female co-host, these varied during the run of the series and included Pat McCormack, Susan Gaye Anderson, Patricia Rumbold, and (during 1959) Joy Fountain. The series aired at 1:00PM on Wednesdays. During 1958, one of the segments included "community singing". Other segments included guests and competitions.

Early Australian television series often aired in just a single city, which was also the case with The Happy Go Lucky Show. It is unlikely (though not impossible) that any of the episodes were kinescoped.
