= Michael Shmith =

Australian journalist and writer (born 1949)

- Born: July 7, 1949 (age 77); Australia
- Occupations: Journalist, writer
- Notable work: The New Pocket Kobbé's Opera Book (1999); Cranlana: The First 100 Years (2019); Merlyn (2021)
- Relatives: George Lascelles, 7th Earl of Harewood (stepfather)

Michael Shmith (born 7 July 1949) is an Australian journalist and writer. Michael Shmith is the son of Athol Shmith and his wife Patricia "Bambi" née Tuckwell (they later divorced).

== Journalist, publicist ==
Shmith worked at The Age newspaper in Melbourne from 1981 as a senior writer for The Age and its arts editor from 1985 to 1993. In 1995, he became communications director for the Australian Ballet. From 2010 to 2017 he was the paper's opera critic. He resigned from that position in August 2017 over a disagreement with The Age's arts editor Hannah Francis about the paper's dwindling coverage of the arts. Since then, he writes reviews for the Australian Book Review.

== Author ==
Shmith edited the 1999 Ebury Publishing edition of The New Pocket Kobbé's Opera Book with his stepfather George Lascelles, 7th Earl of Harewood. Shmith's 2019 book, Cranlana: The First 100 Years, described the garden and house of Sidney Myer and Merlyn Myer in Toorak, Melbourne. His biography of Merlyn Myer, Merlyn, was published in 2021.
