= Room for Two (Australian TV series) =

- Genre: Variety show
- Presented by: Ray Taylor
- Country of origin: Australia
- Original language: English

Production
- Running time: 60 minutes

Original release
- Network: ATN-7
- Release: 1958 – 1959

Related
- Sydney Tonight

Room for Two is an Australian television series which aired on Sydney station ATN-7 during 1958–1959. Hosted by Ray Taylor, it was an hour-long variety program, and a spin-off from Sydney Tonight. An episode aired 11 December 1958 was the first Australian TV episode to feature songs from the hit musical My Fair Lady. Like many ATN series of the era, the series featured the ATN Orchestra, conducted by Thomas Tycho.
