= Movie Guide (TV program) =

- Genre: Talk show
- Presented by: Jean Battersby
- Country of origin: Australia
- Original language: English

Production
- Running time: 15 minutes

Original release
- Network: HSV-7
- Release: 29 August 1958 – 24 July 1959

Movie Guide was an Australian television program which aired on Melbourne station HSV-7 from 29 August 1958 to 24 July 1959.

According to 1950s-era TV listings, the series was hosted by Jean Battersby. Each episode was 15 minutes in duration, and aired at 4:15PM on Fridays. According to TV listings, the series presented reviews of new films.

The series aired only in Melbourne. Prior to 1959 Australian television was limited to Sydney and Melbourne, and it was common for early Australian series to air in only a single city.

Jean Battersby's other hosting duties on HSV-7 during the 1950s included Personal Column and What's On.
