= Personal Column (TV program) =

- Genre: Lifestyle
- Presented by: Brenda Marshall; Jean Battersby
- Country of origin: Australia
- Original language: English

Production
- Running time: 15 minutes

Original release
- Network: HSV-7
- Release: 27 August 1958 – 6 May 1959

Personal Column is an Australian television program. It aired on Melbourne station HSV-7, broadcast weekly at 4:00PM on Wednesdays from 27 August 1958 to 6 May 1959. Episodes aired in a 15-minute time-slot. It was replaced on the schedule by Brenda's Time with HSV personality Brenda Marshall, a program about which very little information is available. The archival status of either program is not known. It should not be confused with Personal Album, a GTV-9 series which also aired from 1958 to 1959.

== Format ==
It appears to have originally been hosted by Brenda Marshall, but most episodes featured Jean Battersby as the host. The program had a format similar to newspaper personal column sections, with Battersby discussing viewers personal problems.

At the time, most Australian programs aired in a single city only, which was also the case with Personal Column.

== See also ==
- Movie Guide
- What's On
