= The Toppanos =

- Also known as: Meet the Toppanos
- Genre: Comedy
- Starring: Enzo Toppano; Peggy Mortimer
- Country of origin: Australia
- Original language: English

Production
- Running time: 15 minutes

Original release
- Network: ATN-7
- Release: 20 October 1958 – 1959

The Toppanos (also known as Meet the Toppanos) is a 15-minute Australian television series which aired from 1958 to 1959 on Sydney station ATN-7. It starred Enzo and Peggy Toppano, and combined music with ab-libbed comedy, along with a dog puppet named Jazza.

Though short-lived, the program is notable as an early example of a morning television series produced in Australia. The series debuted on 20 October 1958. It aired at 8:30AM each weekday, and followed on Mondays, Tuesdays and Wednesdays at 8:45AM by Autumn Affair, which was Australia's first television soap opera, and followed on Thursdays and Fridays by U.S. series Dr. Christian. Also on the ATN-7 morning schedule during the period were cartoons, music segments from taped editions of Sydney Tonight, news, and weather forecasts.

A contemporary review of the debut of ATN-7's morning schedule in The Australian Women's Weekly said the Toppanos "provide some pleasant music and painless chatter".

Information on the archival status of the series is not available. The National Film and Sound Archive lists an item consisting of Enzo Toppano and Peggy Mortimer (Toppano) performing a song and comedy sketch on early television, which may possibly be footage from The Toppanos, though this is not confirmed.
