= The Annette Klooger Show =

- Genre: Variety
- Starring: Annette Klooger
- Country of origin: Australia
- Original language: English

Production
- Running time: 30 minutes

Original release
- Network: ABC Television
- Release: 1959 – 1961

The Annette Klooger Show is an Australian television series that aired 1959–61 on ABC. Starring singer Annette Klooger, it was a half-hour variety series that aired live in Melbourne, and was kinescoped for showing in Sydney (it is not known if it was also shown on ABC's stations in Adelaide, Brisbane and Perth).

In one episode, the performers were Klooger, Ted Preston Quartet, The Unichords, flute player John Wright, singer Frankie Davidson and singer Terry Stanhope.

Archival status is unknown. Two episodes are held by National Film and Sound Archive.
