= RSN Racing & Sport =

Radio station in Victoria, Australia

- Melbourne, Victoria; Australia
- Frequencies: AM: 927 kHz (Melbourne); DAB+: 9A (Melbourne)

Programming
- Language: English
- Format: Horse racing, sports radio

Ownership
- Owner: Sports Entertainment Group; (Sports Entertainment Network Pty Ltd)

History
- First air date: 8 March 1925 (as 3UZ)
- Former frequencies: 930 kHz (1925–1978) (Melbourne)

Technical information
- Licensing authority: Australian Communications and Media Authority
- Power: 5 kW
- Repeaters: 1314 kHz AM (3BT Ballarat); 18 AM and FM open narrowcast repeaters

Links
- Public licence information: Profile
- Website: www.rsn.net.au

RSN Racing & Sport (ACMA call sign 3UZ, verbally referred to as RSN 927) is an Australian radio station in Australia. It broadcasts a sports radio format to Melbourne, and to much of Victoria through various repeater stations.

First broadcast as 3UZ on 8 March 1925, it was sold in 1986 to the state's racing harness and greyhound racing bodies, as well as the three Melbourne-based throughbred clubs (Victoria Racing Club, Melbourne Racing Club and Moonee Valley Racing Club) as well as Country Racing Victoria. The metropolitan clubs continued to hold individual stakes following the formation of Racing Victoria as the state's principal thoroughbred racing authority in 2001. RSN's programming was previously syndicated to racing radio services in Tasmania and the Australian Capital Territory, however as of 2024 it broadcasts to the state of Victoria only.

In 2021, Racing Victoria took control of the thoroughbred industry's stake in RSN via its integrated media arm, making it a sister to its television station and web site, Racing.com. The harness racing and greyhound authorities continue to hold stakes in RSN.

Today, the majority of the station's programming is dedicated to coverage of thoroughbred, harness and greyhound racing.

== History ==
=== As 3UZ ===
3UZ was founded by electrical engineer Oliver John Nilsen CBE, who was later to become a Lord Mayor of Melbourne. Known as "O.J.", Nilsen had created an electrical business, Oliver J. Nilsen & Co. (later Oliver J. Nilsen (Australia) Ltd) in 1916, manufacturing electric jugs, kettles, toasters, crystal sets and radios.

On 6 February 1925, Nilsen was granted a broadcasting licence, and in March 3UZ commenced operations as "The Voice of Victoria". Initially, the station broadcast on 930 kHz AM from studios in 45 Bourke Street, under Victoria's first "B-class" licence, permitting it to broadcast paid advertisements. At the time, other stations were dependent on subscriptions. 3UZ's first lineup saw Keith Cooke engaged as chief announcer, with Leslie Dobson, George Cowley, Dulcie Cherry and Gertrude Hutton included as the first "night artists".

"...has received many favourable comments from Tasmania, South Australia and New South Wales, and many remote country districts in Victoria on its transmission."

In 1929, 3UZ, along with rival Melbourne station 3DB, participated in experimental television broadcasts using the Radiovision system. In 1978, with the implementation of 9 kHz spacing on the AM band, the station moved to 927 kHz.

Over the sixty years between 1925 and 1985, the station achieved consistent top ratings as "The Greater 3UZ", with stars including Stan "The Man" Rofe, Eric "Tiny" Snell, John McMahon, Nicky Whitta, Graham Kennedy, Happy Hammond, Allan Lappan, Don Lunn, Ken Sparkes, John Vertigan, Neil Thompson, Sjaak Kusters, Martha Gardener, Stephanie Deste, Don Lane and Bert Newton.

In 1985, the Nilsen family sold 3UZ for $9.2 million to Launceston-based ENT Limited, associated with the controversial figure Edmund Rouse.

==== Programmes ====
A handful of programme titles from 3UZ's history:

- Bolero
- Clancy Of The Overflow
- Crosbie Morrison Session
- Dan Dare
- Grouches and Appreciations
- Harry Dearth's Playhouse
- Hymn for the Day
- Newsbeat
  News Beat reported motor vehicle accidents in Melbourne, with audio recorded at the scene, interviewing witnesses and tow-truck drivers and typically ending with "... and here is the police report". Eventually, Newsbeat reporter Neil Thompson attended a fatal accident which turned out be his own son's. In later years, the program broadened its focus to include any calls made on emergency services – ambulance, fire police. It was broadcast on Sunday mornings, with the tagline "this was Melbourne, overnight". In the 1980s, it was hosted by Paul Makin.
- Portia Faces Life
- Radio Auditions
  Hosted by Johnny McMahon, Radio Auditions was an extraordinarily long-lived talent show in which participants were awarded up to three "gongs". By the late 1960s it had become a rather sad affair, with Shirley Radford heroically attempting to provide piano accompaniment to nervous persons whose ambitions exceeded their talent. Entertainer Barry Crocker first appeared on the programme as did Jamie Redfern who went on to appear with Shirley Radford on HSV7's Brian and The Juniors. Shirley Radford was best known for showcasing talented musicians.
- Tailwaggers’ Club
- The Early Risers’ Club
- Who's Who in Rhythm

=== As Sport 927 ===
However, just one year later, 3UZ was onsold to the Victorian thoroughbred, harness and greyhound racing bodies. In 1988, the station re-introduced horse racing coverage, leading the station to rebrand as Sport 927 in 1996. Throughout the late 1990s and 2000s, the station would acquire various AM and FM open narrowcast radio stations, as well as Shepparton-based 3SR, extending coverage across Victoria. It also established 3BT as a Ballarat-based rebroadcaster as 3BA transferred to the FM band, and affiliated with ACTTAB Radio and TOTE Sport Radio.

In 2004, the station participated in DAB digital radio trials in Melbourne, alongside 3RRR, ABC Classic FM, ABC DiG, Radio 2 and SBS Radio. In May, the station took Nielsen Media Research to court, citing "hundreds of thousands of dollars" in lost advertising revenue due to ratings reporting policies. The case returned in April, and reached a settlement in September.

=== As RSN Racing and Sport ===
Briefly, in 2011, the station rebranded as Radio Sport National. However, coinciding with the pending sale of Tote Tasmania to Tatts Group, the station rebranded as RSN Racing & Sport. Following this sale, RSN was replaced on its Tasmanian frequencies by Brisbane-based RadioTAB.

The 927 kHz Melbourne frequency was slowly returned to RSN's branding starting in 2014 (Note: For instance, the frequency was returned to the RSN logo on their website in February 2014, based on evidence from Wayback Machine snapshots ( on February 21st vs. on February 16th).), although the "RSN" name was retained. ACTTAB Radio also eventually dropped its simulcast of RSN following that TAB's purchase by Tabcorp in 2014, with the Sydney-based Sky Sports Radio broadcast in its place.

With Racing Victoria having recently purchased the throughbred industry's stake in the station, RSN was relaunched in early 2023, with plans announced at the time for a deeper specific focus on Victorian racing, including during afternoon and evening coverage on its main service.

== Frequencies ==
- 3UZ Melbourne 927 AM
- 3BT Ballarat 1314 AM
- Bairnsdale 87.6 FM
- Bendigo 945 AM
- Hamilton 87.6 FM
- Heywood 88.0 FM
- Lakes Entrance 89.9 FM
- Mildura 1359 AM
- Moe 88.0 FM
- Orbost 95.5 FM
- Sale 87.6 FM
- Swan Hill 106.9 FM
- Traralgon 87.6 FM
- Wangaratta 99.3 FM
- Warrnambool 87.6 FM
- Yarram 92.7 FM

== Digital radio ==
In Melbourne, RSN Racing & Sport is simulcast on DAB+ digital radio, as well as via streaming services. The station currently operates two additional stations on digital platforms, which as of 2024 are branded RSN Xtra and RSN Xtra 2. These two digital stations were originally branded RSN Carnival, providing capacity for additional programming during major events such as the Victorian Spring Racing Carnival.

RSN also provides an audio simulcast of Sky Racing through its digital services. Originally an additional DAB+ service known as TAB Live, the first RSN Xtra channel is now used for this purpose since 2023. Unlike Sky Racing simulcasts on Tabcorp-owned Sky Sports Radio (which run during radio station downtime), this service operates only operates between 10:00 and 23:00, as a supplement to in-depth race-day coverage on the main RSN channel, and simulcasts RSN's normal programming at other times.

RSN's digital platforms were also used to broadcast Victorian Amateur Football Association matches and shows between 2019 and 2023; in 2023 these were broadcast on RSN Xtra 2. The rights to VAFA games passed to rival radio network SEN in 2024.

== See also ==
- Radio Times
