= Australia Unlimited =

- Genre: Factual
- Country of origin: Australia
- Original language: English

Production
- Running time: 15-30 minutes

Original release
- Network: Australian Broadcasting Corporation
- Release: 7 November 1956 – 1961

Australia Unlimited is an Australian television program, which aired from 1956 to circa 1961 on Sydney station ABN-2, with part of the run also being shown on Melbourne station ABV-2. The first episode of the series aired 7 November 1956. The series moved time-slot and day of broadcast several times. Ron Powell hosted the series for part of the run. Originally 30 minutes, it later became a 15-minute show. It was one of the first series produced by the ABC.

Topics in early episodes of the non-fiction series (which largely focused on rural subjects) varied from snakes to bonsai trees, the latter considered an odd choice of subject matter by The Australian Women's Weekly.

The National Film and Sound Archive holds a radio episode of a show called Australia Unlimited from 1955, as well as several scripts, but it is unknown if that is related to the television program.
