= Sydney Tonight =

- Also known as: Tonight
- Genre: Variety show
- Presented by: Keith Walshe; Roy Hampson
- Country of origin: Australia
- Original language: English

Original release
- Network: ATN-7
- Release: December 1956 – 1959

Related
- Tonight Starring Steve Allen

Sydney Tonight is an Australian television variety series which aired from December 1956 to early 1959 on Sydney station ATN-7. Originally compered by Keith Walshe, it was later hosted by Roy Hampson and re-titled Tonight. The series featured a format including guests, interviews, audience participation, and music. Like In Melbourne Tonight, which came later, it was patterned on the American series Tonight Starring Steve Allen.

In October 1958, station ATN-7 experimented by using video-tape recordings of Sydney Tonight segments as part of their morning line-up. Reviewing the morning line-up, Nan Musgrove of The Australian Women's Weekly criticised the use of the Sydney Tonight segments, saying that "I may be peculiar, but ladies in full warpaint and baretopped evening dresses at 7:30 a.m. wiggling their way through seductive songs are not my favorite breakfast entertainment", though the reviewer had more positive feelings towards the other morning offerings, soap opera Autumn Affair and music series The Toppanos.

The series had segment titled Ardath Hit Parade which was later spun off into its own series.

A kinescope of a 1958 episode of the series is held by the National Film and Sound Archive.

== Reception ==
The 2 January 1957 edition of Australian Women's Weekly gave the series 2/4, saying that "Variety artists so far have been good" but felt that Walshe was not a compelling host.
