= Jean Battersby =

- Born: 28 March 1928
- Died: 24 February 2009 (aged 80)
- Occupation: CEO of the Australia Council for the Arts

Jean Battersby, AO (28 March 1928 – 24 February 2009) was an Australian arts executive and adviser, and the founding chief executive officer of the Australian Council for the Arts in 1968.

== Early life ==
Born Jean Robinson in Drouin, Victoria, she attended Geelong Church of England Grammar School and gained a PhD in French literature at the University of Melbourne with a thesis on Charles Baudelaire, and undertook postgraduate studies at the Sorbonne.

== Career ==
In the late 1950s she hosted several television series on HSV-7: Movie Guide, Personal Column and What's On. In 1968, she was invited by H. C. Coombs, chairman of the Australian Council for the Arts, to become its first executive officer. Coombs became her mentor and friend.

She was appointed an Officer of the Order of Australia in 1986.

In 1987 she began a new career as an arts advisory consultant for corporate buyers.

== Family ==
In 1950 she married Charles Battersby, whom she met as a university student.

== Death ==
She died in a Sydney nursing home after an 18-month battle with cancer of the oesophagus.
