= The Jean Bowring Show =

- Genre: Cooking show
- Presented by: Jean Bowring
- Country of origin: Australia
- Original language: English

Production
- Running time: 15 minutes; 30 minutes

Original release
- Network: HSV-7
- Release: 1957 – 1960

The Jean Bowring Show is an Australian television cooking show that aired on Melbourne station HSV-7 from 1957 to 1960. At one point it aired in a 15-minute timeslot, but later became a 30-minute series.

The Jean Bowring show is notable as an early attempt by Australian television at producing programming aimed at women, along with series like HSV-7's Interior Decoration (with Joyce Turner) and ABC's Women's World (with Joy Wren).

It is not known if any kinescope recordings exist of the series. During the 1950s/1960s in Australia, daytime series were rarely considered worth keeping after broadcast.

== See also ==
- Health Club (TV_series)
