= Martha Gardener =

Australian broadcaster

Martha Gardener is the nom de plume used by Kathleen Zoe Worrall (née Norris), during nearly all of her career of well over 50 years, at Melbourne broadcasting stations 3DB, 3AW, Australian Broadcasting Corporation radio and 3UZ, and nationally for The Nine television Network.

== Personal life ==
Kathleen Norris was born in Camberwell, a suburb of Melbourne, Australia on 9 February 1905. She was the second of four children born to John Alexander Norris (public servant) and Ellen (née Heffernan). Martha was educated at Milverton Girls' Grammar School, Camberwell. She trained as a teacher and, during the 1920s, taught at St Duthus Girls' School, Canterbury.

On 18 April 1929, Kathleen Norris married journalist David Thomas Worrall at the Independent Church, Collins Street, Melbourne. They had two children. The Worrall's lived on 7 acres (2.83 ha) of orchard and bushland at Donvale. Shortly after their marriage, David Worrall was appointed as Manager of Melbourne broadcasting station 3DB.

In 1942, her 12-year-old daughter died as a result of a horse-riding accident.

Martha Gardener died on 12 February 1991, in the Melbourne suburb of South Yarra, outliving her husband, son and daughter. Her estate of over A$2 million was bequeathed to the Little Sisters of the Poor in the Melbourne suburb of Northcote.

== Broadcasting career ==
=== 3DB ===
Kathleen Worrall's radio career began in an ad hoc way, filling-in for various 3DB presenters during the 1930s; that is, during the early years of her husband David Worrall's long stint as station manager. For some two years she was the Queen in a program called The King and Queen of Nonsense, during which she called upon her talents as a pianist and on her experience in amateur theatre.

In the 1940s, she was a fill-in in the 3DB Gardening Show, and it was then that she adopted the name Martha Gardener. She later explained that "it sounded nice and homely".

As a way of coping with the death of her daughter in 1942, she pursued a more active broadcasting career, initially on a shopping and cooking advice show called Can I Help You?. This led to her getting a well-deserved reputation as a person who gave advice to listeners in a chatty and informal manner. Can I Help You? also set the path for the career that she would follow for the rest of her life.

=== 3AW ===
Martha is best known for the 30 years that she spent at 3AW, commencing in July 1952. Her popular hourlong program Martha Gardener Recommends was broadcast every afternoon, Monday to Friday. Initially, listeners were asked to send Martha their household, gardening, etc., queries either by mail or by telephone, and they were then passed onto Martha in the studio, but after tallkback radio was made legal in Australia in 1967, all queries were handled live on air.

Martha once admitted that she had had little hands-on experience of housework or cooking. However, she did complete a course at the Emily McPherson College of Domestic Economy. She was a voracious reader with an extraordinary memory, which helped her develop knowledge of the subjects on which she gave advice. She also treated callers with respect, particularly younger listeners.

=== 3UZ ===
After leaving 3AW, Martha spent a few years on 3UZ, commencing in July 1982.

=== The Nine Network ===
For some time, Martha Gardener presented a segment on Channel Nine's The Mike Walsh Show.

=== Australian Broadcasting Corporation radio ===
As late as 1989, Martha was a regular guest on various ABC radio programs.

== Heritage ==
Martha Gardener is still remembered today:

- firstly for Martha's Wool Mix, a mixture of soap flakes, methylated spirits and eucalyptus oil, which was, until recently, available at most supermarkets, and which was named after her, because she used to suggest that her listeners make this product themselves, but then it was produced commercially. The same product is now marketed under the Softly name and is available at major supermarkets such as Woolworths, Coles and IGA;
- secondly, in the 1980s Martha Gardener produced a TV commercial to advertise Martha's Stain Removal Kit;
- thirdly, Martha Gardener made a number of contributions to the 60th anniversary history of 3DB, in 1987, with Bert Newton, then Manager of 3DB;
- in the fourth place, for a book that she published in 1985, Martha Gardener's Book; Everyone's Household Help, and which is still available second-hand. The book has Martha's image on the cover.
