= Let's Make Clothes =

- Genre: Lifestyle
- Presented by: Joyce Turner; Dorothy Bradfield
- Country of origin: Australia
- Original language: English

Original release
- Network: HSV-7
- Release: 29 July – 14 October 1959

Let's Make Clothes is an Australian television series.

It was broadcast on Melbourne station HSV-7 from 29 July to 14 October 1959. In the series, Joyce Turner and Dorothy Bradfield demonstrated methods of making dresses at home. It was common at the time for Australian daytime TV series to air in only a single city, which was the case with Let's Make Clothes. The archival status of the series is not known.

== See also ==
- Strictly for Mothers - Another 1959 daytime series on HSV-7
