= What's On (Australian TV program) =

- Genre: Entertainment
- Presented by: Jean Battersby
- Country of origin: Australia
- Original language: English

Production
- Running time: 13 minutes

Original release
- Network: HSV-7
- Release: 29 July – 14 October 1959

What's On was an Australian television program, which aired in Melbourne on station HSV-7. The short-lived weekly program aired on Wednesdays from 29 July 1959 to 14 October 1959, and was hosted by Jean Battersby. Each episode was about 13 minutes long. According to TV listings in The Age newspaper, the program presented a round-up of stage and film entertainment in the Melbourne area.

The archival status of the program is unknown.
