= Comment =

Comment may refer to:

== Computing ==
- Comment (computer programming), explanatory text or information embedded in the source code of a computer program
- Comment programming, a software development technique based on the regular use of comment tags

== Law ==
- Public comment, a term used by various U.S. government agencies, referring to comments invited regarding a report or proposal
- Short scholarly papers written by members of a law review
- Comments on proposed rules under the rulemaking process in United States administrative law

== Media and entertainment ==
- Comment (TV series), a 1958 Australian television series
- Comment (album), a 1970 album by Les McCann
- "Comment", a 1969 song by Charles Wright & the Watts 103rd Street Rhythm Band
- Comment, a quarterly journal published by Cardus
- Comment, later aCOMMENT, an Australian quarterly literary magazine published 1940-7
- Comment section, a user-generated content feature of Web content allowing readers to publish comments

== Other ==
- Comment (linguistics) or rheme, that which is said about the topic (theme) of a sentence
- Bernard Comment (born 1960), Swiss writer and publisher

== See also ==
- Commentary (disambiguation)
- Comment spam (disambiguation)
- Internet commentator (disambiguation)
- Remark (disambiguation)
- Annotation, an explanation included with other data
- Footnote, a note at the bottom of a page
- Obiter dictum, a remark or observation made by a judge that does not form a necessary part of the court's decision
