= Primary education =

First stage of education for children

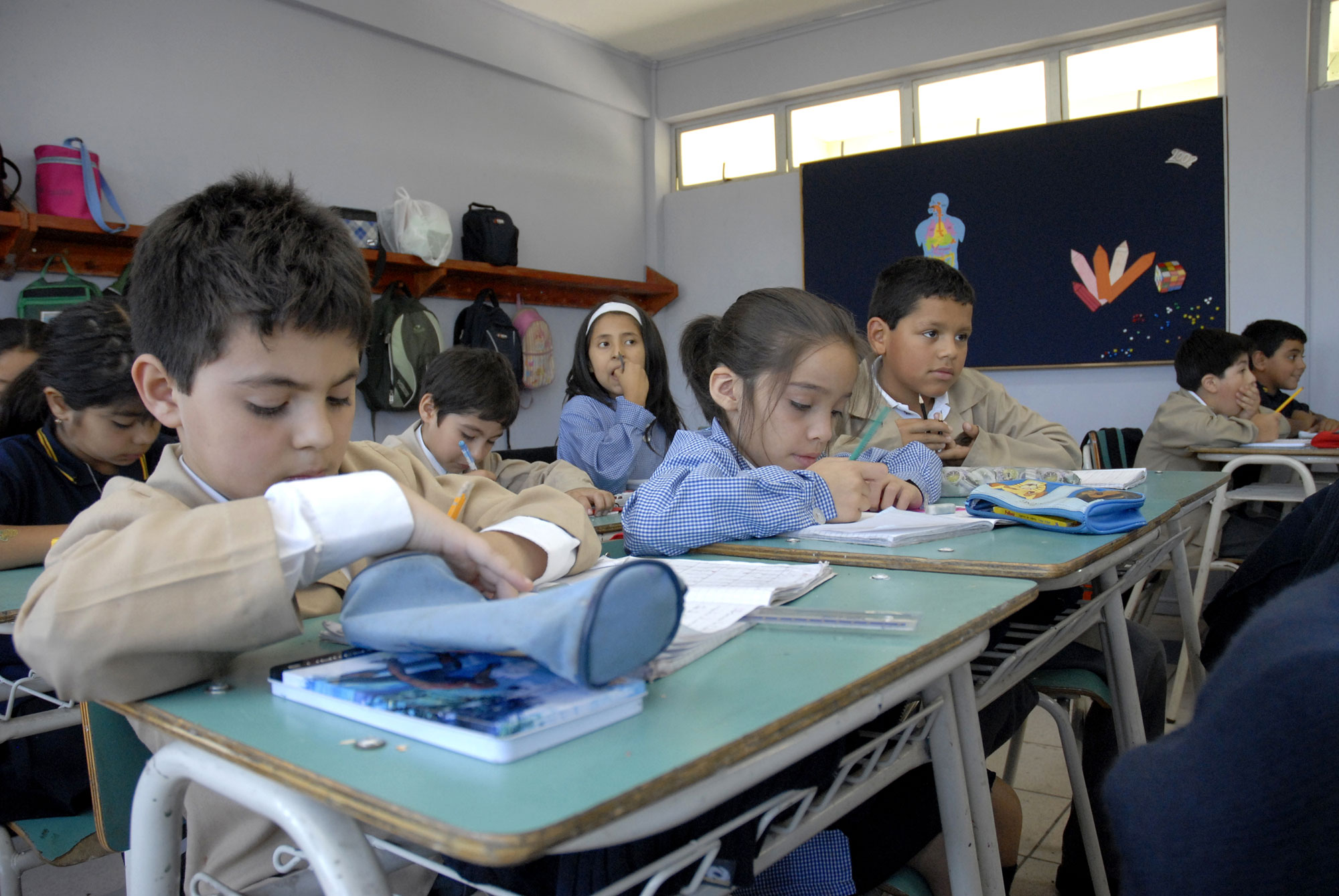
School children in primary education, Chile

Total net enrollment rate in primary education (as of 2015)

Primary education is the first stage of formal education, coming after preschool/kindergarten and before secondary education. Primary education takes place in primary schools, elementary schools, or first schools and middle schools, depending on the location. Hence, in the United Kingdom and some other countries, the term primary is used instead of elementary.

The duration varies by country, but it typically lasts between three and six years. In some countries, such as the United States, the first seven to nine years of schooling are considered part of primary education.

The International Standard Classification of Education considers primary education as a single phase where programs are typically designed to provide fundamental reading, writing, and mathematics skills and establish a solid foundation for learning. This is ISCED Level 1: Primary education or the first stage of basic education. (Note: Basic education corresponds to the first nine years of formal schooling and is made of two levels distinguished as Levels 1 and 2. Level 1 should correspond to primary education and Level 2 to lower secondary. ISCED.)

== Definition ==
The ISCED definition in 1997 posited that primary education normally started between the ages of 5 – 8 and was designed to give a sound basic education in reading, writing, and mathematics along with an elementary understanding of other subjects. By 2011 the philosophy had changed, the elementary understanding of other subjects had been dropped in favour of "to establish a solid foundation for learning".

The United Nations Children's Fund (UNICEF), believes that providing children with primary education has many positive effects. It:

- Decreases poverty
- Decreases child mortality rates
- Encourages gender equality
- Increases environmental understanding

The ages cited cover a rapidly developing phase of child development. This is studied in the discipline of developmental psychology, which attempts to describe how children learn.

In the United Kingdom, reception, the first year of primary school, is part of the Early Years Foundation Stage.

The philosophy of education—teaching and learning— attempts to say what children should be taught.

== History ==
In pre-agrarian cultures, children learnt by following their instinct to play. There was no need for enforced education. In agrarian cultures, agriculture, husbandry, bartering, and building skills can be passed on from adults to children or master to apprentice. Societies agree on the need for their children to learn and absorb their cultural traditions and beliefs. They attempt to do this informally in the family or by gathering the children together and employing a tutor to handle the task. This worked well for the landowners, but the children of the landless would be employed from the age of seven as servants. In one source from the turn of the 15th century, a French count advised that nobles' huntsmen should "choose a boy servant as young as seven or eight" and that "...this boy should be beaten until he has a proper dread of failing to carry out his masters orders." The document listed chores that the boy would perform daily and that the boy would sleep in a loft above the kennels to attend to the hounds' needs.

Religious communities became providers of education and defined the curriculum. Learning to recite passages from their holy text is a priority. For their society to advance, the oral tradition must be superseded by written texts; some students must write down the passages. Monasteries students needed to read out what is written in the religious language and not just the vernacular. This led to formal education in madrassas and schools. Martin Luther declared that salvation depends on each person's own reading of the Scriptures. Trading and management create a demand for accountancy. Basic skills thus included literacy and numeracy. This was the core of Elementary Education.

In mid 17th century America, Massachusetts became the first colony to mandate schooling for this purpose. Beginning in 1690, children there and in adjacent colonies learned to read from the New England Primer, known colloquially as "The Little Bible of New England".

=== History of elementary education in Europe ===
During Greek and Roman times, boys were educated by their mothers until the age of seven, then according to the culture of their location and times, would start formal education. In Sparta until twelve, it would be at a military academy building up physical fitness and combat skills, but also reading, writing and arithmetic while in Athens the emphasis would be on understanding the laws of the polis, reading, writing, arithmetic and music with gymnastics and athletics, and learning the moral stories of Homer. Girls received all their education at home. In Rome the primary school was called the ludus; the curriculum developed over the centuries featuring the learning of both Latin and Greek. In AD 94, Quintilian published the systematic educational work, Institutio Oratoria. He distinguished between teaching and learning, and that a child aged between 7 and 14 learned by sense experience, learns to form ideas, develops language and memory. He recommended that teachers should motivate their pupils by making the teaching interesting, rather than by corporal punishment. The trivium (grammar, rhetoric and logic) and quadrivium (arithmetic, geometry, astronomy and music) were legacies of the Roman curriculum.

==== The medieval church and education in Europe ====
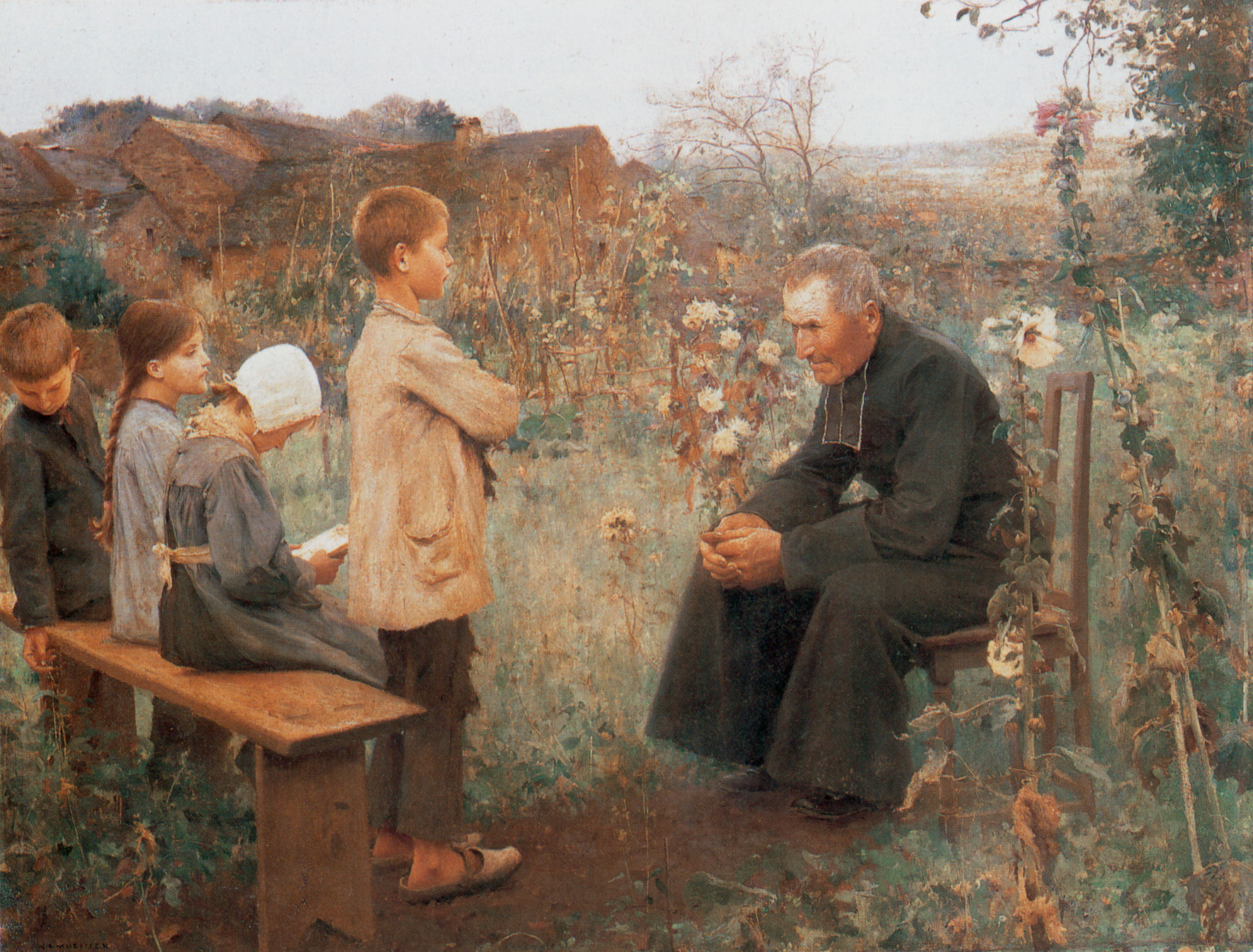
The Catechism Lesson by Jules-Alexis Meunier

As the Roman influence waned, the great cathedral schools were established to provide a source of choristers and clergy. Kings School, Canterbury dates from 597. The Council of Rome in 853 specified that each parish should provide elementary education: religious ritual but also reading and writing Latin. The purpose of education was to explain salvation, not social change. The church had a monopoly on education; the feudal lords concurred and allowed their sons to be educated at the few church schools. The economy in most of Europe was agrarian and the children of serfs started work as soon as they were able. It was accepted as a truth by Christians that man was created by God in the image of Adam with his share of original sin and that a boy was born sinful. Therefore, only the teachings of the church and the sacraments could redeem him. The parishes provided elementary education- but had no requirement to provide it to every child. The need was to produce priests, and in a stable kingdom such as that of Charlemagne, administrators with elementary writing skills in Latin and the arithmetic needed to collect taxes and administer them. Alcuin (735–804) developed teaching material that was based on the catechetical method- repeating and memorizing questions and answers, although often understanding the information was not important. These skills were also needed in the great abbeys such as Cluny. There was a divergence between the needs of town and monasteries and we see the development of the parish, chantry, monastic, and cathedral schools. With the entry of women into church life, convents were established, and with them convent schools. Girls entered at the age of eight and were taught Latin grammar, religious doctrine, and music, and the women's arts of spinning, weaving, tapestry, painting, and embroidery. Bede entered the monastic school at Jarrow at the age of seven and became a writer and historian. Chantry schools were the result of charitable donations and educated the poor. Parishes were obliged to provide schooling, and cathedrals had to establish schools after the Third Council of the Lateran in 1179. Elementary education was mainly to teach sufficient Latin for the trivium and the quadrivium that formed the basis of the secondary curriculum.

==== Renaissance ====
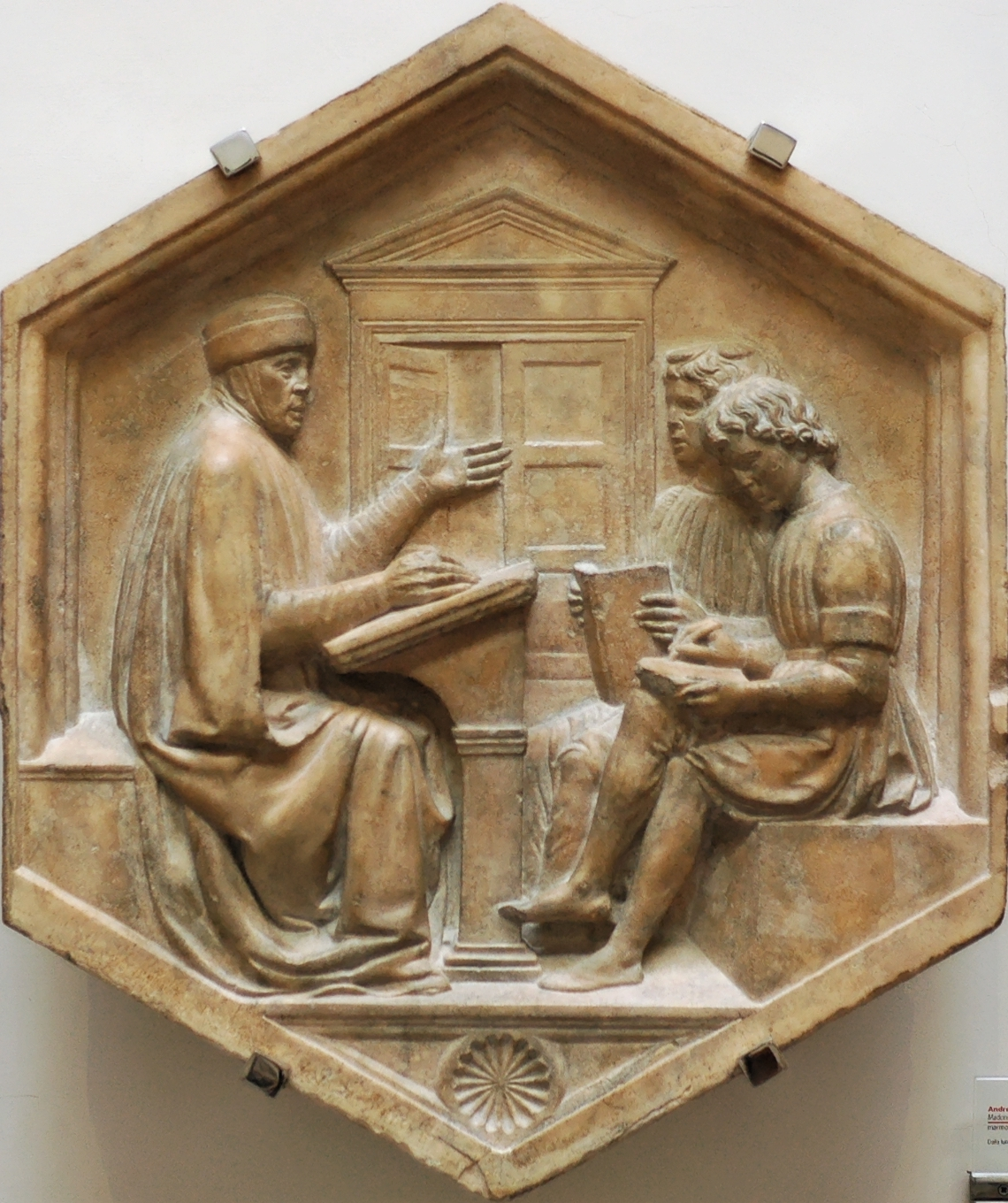
Priscian

While Humanism had a great change on the secondary curriculum, the primary curriculum was unaffected. It was believed that by studying the works of the greats, ancients who had governed empires, one became fit to succeed in any field. Renaissance boys from the age of five learned Latin grammar using the same books as the Roman child. There were the grammars of Donatus and Priscian followed by Caesar's Commentaries and then St Jerome's Latin Vulgate.

Wealthy boys were educated by tutors. Others were educated in schools attached to the parishes, cathedrals, or abbeys. From the 13th century, wealthy merchants endowed money for priests to "establish as a school to teach grammar". These early grammar schools were to teach basic, or elementary grammar, to boys. No age limit was specified. Early examples in England included Lancaster Royal Grammar School, Royal Latin School, Buckingham, and Stockport Grammar School. The Reformation and the Dissolution of the Monasteries (1548) disrupted the funding of many schools. The schools petitioned the King, Edward VI, for an endowment. Examples of schools receiving endowments are King Edward VI Grammar School, Louth, King Edward VI Grammar School, Norwich and King Edward VI School, Stratford-upon-Avon, where William Shakespeare was thought to be a pupil from the age of 7 to 14.

==== Paupers and the poor ====
Though the Grammar schools were set up to deliver elementary education, they did require their entrants to have certain skills on admission. In particular, they expected them to be able to read and write in the vernacular. There was a need for something more basic.

This was addressed by Dame schools, then charity schools, often set up by the churches (C of E schools), Bell's British Schools and Joseph Lancaster's National Schools.

==== Educational philosophies ====
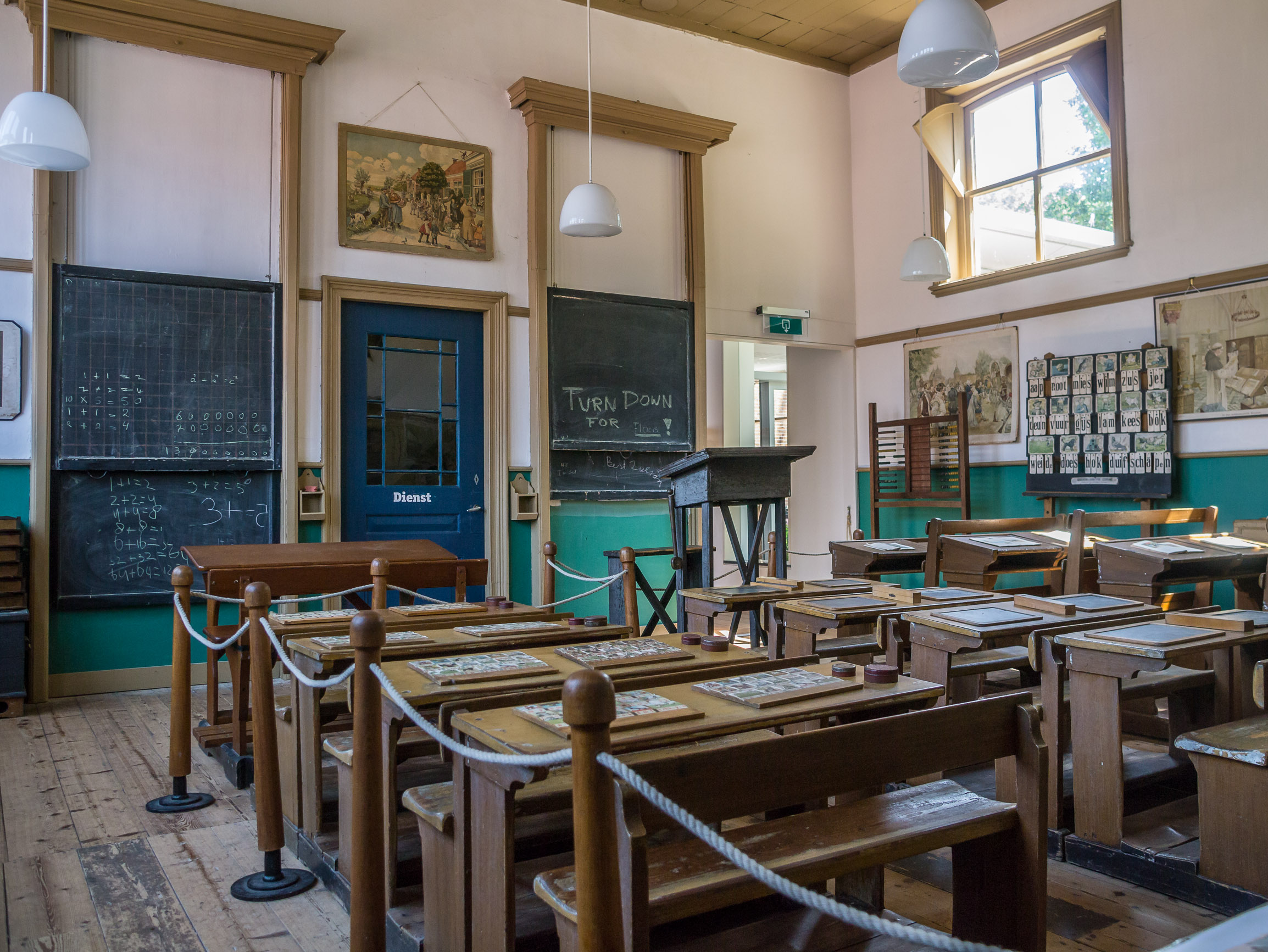
Classroom from 1910 in a late 19 century elementary school, Het Hoogeland Openluchtmuseum

Certain movements in education had relevance in all of Europe and its diverging colonies. The Americans were interested in the thoughts of Pestalozzi, Joseph Lancaster, Owen and the Prussian schools.

=== History of primary education in England ===
In England, 1870 was the beginning of compulsory state education. Elementary schools in England and Wales were publicly funded schools which provided a basic standard of education for children aged from six to 14 between 1870 and 1944. These were set up to enable children to receive manual training and elementary instruction, and provided a restricted curriculum with the emphasis on reading, writing and arithmetic (the three Rs). The schools operated on a monitorial system, whereby one teacher supervised a large class with the assistance of a team of monitors, who were quite often older pupils. Elementary school teachers were paid based on students' results. Their pupils were expected to achieve precise standards in reading, writing and arithmetic: such as reading a short paragraph in a newspaper, writing from dictation, and working out sums and fractions. To achieve this, a dual education system was initiated, consisting of both voluntary denominational schools and non-denominational state schools (Board schools) to supplement rather than replace schools already run by the churches, guilds, and private individuals or organisations.

Before 1944 around 80 percent of the school population attended elementary schools through to 14. The remainder transferred either to secondary school or to junior technical school at age 11. The school system was changed with the Education Act 1944. Education was restructured into three progressive stages, which were known as primary education, secondary education and further education.

==== Timeline of 20th century English education ====
- 1912 – Maria Montessori publishes The Montessori Method.
- 1915 – John and Evelyn Dewey publish School of Tomorrow.
- 1918 – Education Act 1918 ends all fees for elementary education and raises the school leaving age from 12 to 14.
- 1919 – The Burnham Committee introduces national pay scales for elementary teachers.
- 1923 – Piaget publishes The Language and Thought of the Child.

A S Neill opens Summerhill.

- 1944 – Elementary education split by age into primary and secondary. A tripartite system with an eleven plus exam.
- 1955 – The last gas lamps are removed from London schools.
- 1957 – Britain's first school TV was broadcast by Associated Rediffusion in May,
- 1958 – BBC Schools TV broadcasting

A S Neill's Summerhill published.

- 1963 – London and Manchester end 11-plus.
- 1967 – The Plowden Report advocates the expansion of nursery schooling.
- 1968 – The Newsom Report on public schools calls for integration with state schools.

== Child development during the primary education phase ==
Jean Piaget was responsible for establishing the framework that describes the intellectual, moral and emotional development of children. He received a doctorate in 1918 and did post-doctoral research in Zürich and Paris. His thoughts developed in four phases:

1. the sociological model of development- where children moved from a position of egocentrism to sociocentrism. He noticed there was a gradual progression from intuitive to scientific and then socially acceptable responses.
2. the biological model of intellectual development -this could be regarded as an extension of the biological process of the adaptation of the species, showing two ongoing processes: assimilation and accommodation.
3. the elaboration of the logical model of intellectual development, where he argued that intelligence develops in a series of stages related to age and are progressive because one stage must be accomplished before the next can occur. For each stage of development, the child forms an age-related view of reality.
4. the study of figurative thought- this included memory and perception. Piaget's theory is based upon biological maturation and stages; the notion of readiness is important. Information or concepts should be taught when the students have reached the appropriate stage of cognitive development and not before.

Using this framework, the child's staged development can be examined. His theory included four stages: the sensorimotor period, the pre operational period, the concrete operational period, and the formal operational period.

Lev Vygotsky's theory is based on social learning, where a more knowledgeable other (MKO) helps a child progress within their zone of proximal development (ZPD). Within the ZPD, there are skills that the child could do but needs to be shown to move from yearning to independent proficiency. The assistance or instruction becomes a form of Instructional scaffolding; this term and idea was developed by Jerome Bruner, David Wood, and Gail Ross. These are in the realms of the:

- Intellectual
- Physical
- Learning skills
- Language
- Emotional

== International interpretations ==
=== Millennium Development Goals ===
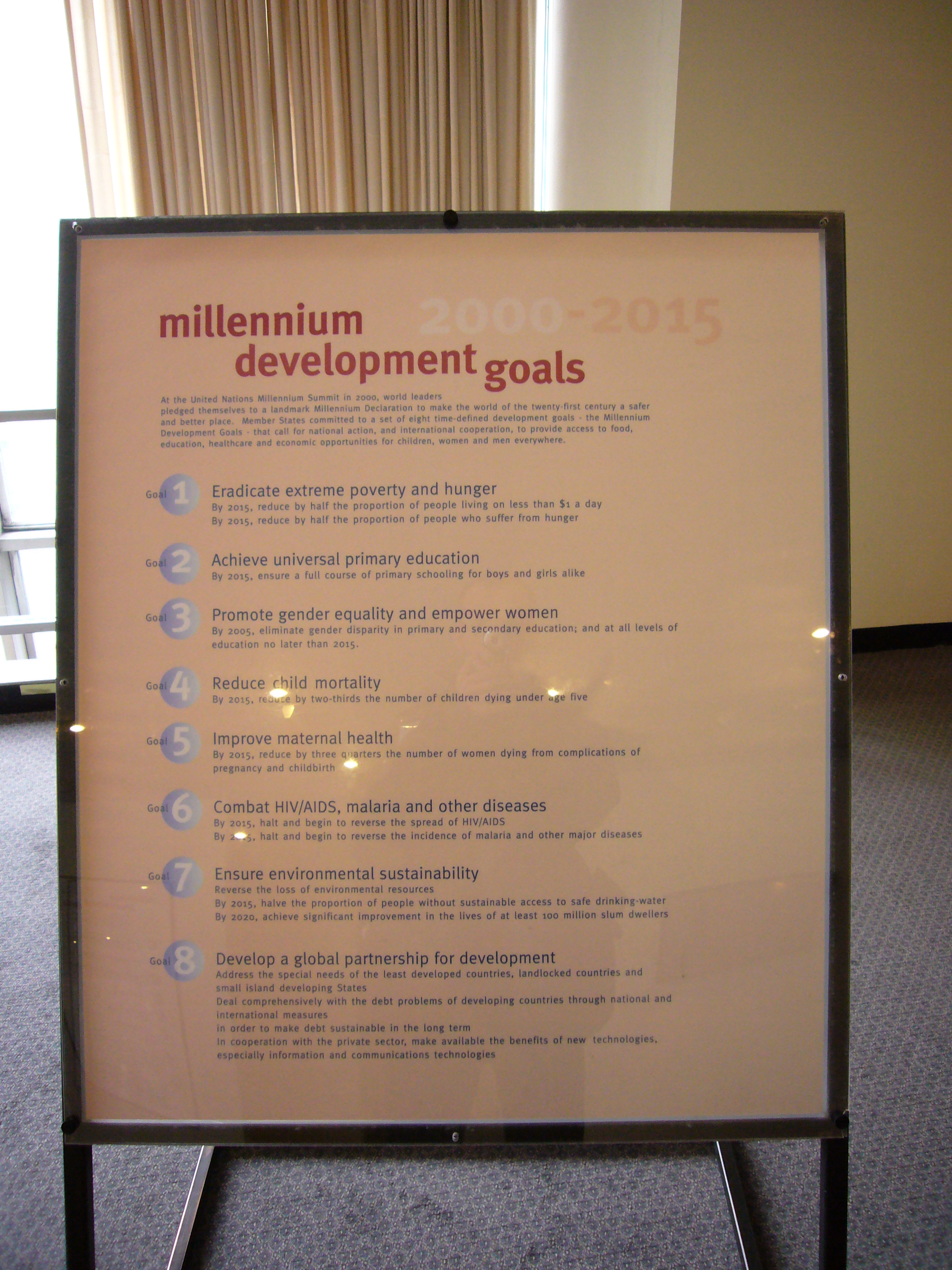
A poster at the United Nations Headquarters in New York City, New York, United States, showing the Millennium Development Goals

The United Nations Millennium Development Goal 2 (2002) was to achieve universal primary education by 2015. By that time, they aimed to ensure that all children everywhere, regardless of race or gender, could complete primary schooling.

Because the United Nations specifically focused on Sub-Saharan Africa and South Asia, as they are both home to the vast majority of children out of school, they hypothesized that they might not have been able to reach their goal by 2015. According to the September 2010 fact sheet, this was because there were still about 69 million school-age children who were not in school with almost half of the demographic in sub-Saharan Africa and more than a quarter in Southern Asia.

In order to achieve the goal by 2015, the United Nations estimated that all children at the official entry age for primary school would have had to have been attending classes by 2009. This would depend upon the duration of the primary level and how well the schools retain students until the end of the cycle.

Not only was it important for children to be enrolled in education, but countries would have to ensure that there were a sufficient number of teachers and classrooms to meet the demand. As of 2010, the number of new teachers needed in sub-Saharan Africa alone, equaled the extant teaching force in the region.

The gender gap for children not in education narrowed. Between 1999 and 2008, the number of girls not in education worldwide had decreased from 57 percent to 53 percent. However, in some regions, the percentage had increased.

According to the United Nations, many things in the regions have already been accomplished. Although enrollment in the sub-Saharan area of Africa continues to be the lowest region worldwide, by 2010, "it still increased by 18 percentage points—from 58 percent to 76 percent—between 1999 and 2008." There was also progress in Southern Asia and North Africa, where both areas saw an increase in enrollment. For example, in Southern Asia, this had increased by 11 percent and in North Africa by 8 percent- over the last decade.

Major advances had been made even in the poorest countries, like the abolition of primary school fees in Burundi where there was an increase in primary-school enrollment, which reached 99 percent as of 2008. Also, Tanzania experienced a similar outcome. The country doubled its enrollment ratio over the same period. Moreover, other regions in Latin America such as Guatemala and Nicaragua, and Zambia in Southern Africa "broke through the 90 percent towards greater access to primary education."

== Promoting the rule of law in primary education ==
Global citizenship education for the rule of law learning outcomes at the primary level

Schools play an important role in children's socialization and in developing their appreciation of sharing, fairness, mutual respect and cooperation. Schools form the foundational values and competencies that are the building blocks towards the understanding of concepts such as justice, democracy and human rights.

Education systems that promote education for justice, that is, respect for the rule of law (RoL) together with international human rights and fundamental freedoms strengthen the relationship between learners and public institutions to empower young people to become champions of peace and justice. Teachers are often on the front line of this work and, along with families, play a formative role in shaping children's attitudes and behaviours.

Global citizenship education provides the overall framework for the approach to the RoL. It aims to empower learners to engage and assume active roles, both locally and globally, as proactive contributors to a more just, peaceful, tolerant, inclusive, secure, and sustainable world.

== See also ==
- Secondary education
- Education Index
- List of education articles by country
- List of schools by country
- The New England Primer 1620–1720

== Sources ==
- This article incorporates text from a free content work. Licensed under CC BY-SA 3.0 IGO. Text taken from Empowering students for just societies: a handbook for primary school teachers, UNESCO, UNESCO. UNESCO.

== Bibliography ==
- India 2009: A Reference Annual (53rd edition), New Delhi: Additional Director General (ADG), Publications Division, Ministry of Information and Broadcasting, Government of India.
- "Organisation of Primary Education". Eurydice - European Commission. 10 October 2017.
- The blackboard clock (1892) Elva Aldrich (subtitled device desk book for the primary teacher, for teaching pupils in first year and kindergarten grades how to tell time of day by the clock, and time drill)
