= Commentator =

Commentator or commentators may refer to:

== Professions and people ==
- Literary commentator or critique, who writes exegesis on a literary work
- Commentator (historical) or Postglossator, a member of a European legal school that arose in France in the fourteenth century
- Political commentator or pundit
- Sports commentator or sportscaster
- The Commentator or Ibn Rushd or Averroes (1126–1198), Andalusian philosopher

== Media ==
- The Commentator, a political website published by Robin Shepherd
- The Commentator, formerly a student publication at Texas A&M University
- The Commentator, student newspaper at Yeshiva College
- Oregon Commentator, formerly a student publication at the University of Oregon

== Other ==
- Commentator (horse) (foaled 2001), American Thoroughbred racehorse
- "The Commentators", a 1985 single by Rory Bremner

== See also ==
- Color commentator, someone who assists the play-by-play commentator
- Commentary (disambiguation)
- Internet commentator (disambiguation)
