= Internet commentator =

Internet commentator means a person who posts or publishes comments on the Internet.

Internet commentator may refer to:

- Shoutcaster, an eSports commentator who streams comment on the Internet
- A critic paid to produce comment for an Internet company
- 50 Cent Party, Internet commentators hired by the government of China to post comments favorable towards government policies
- Russian web brigades, anonymous Internet political commentators and trolls linked to the Russian government

== See also ==
- Pundit, a person who offers his or her opinion or commentary on a particular subject area
- Internet (disambiguation)
- Commentator (disambiguation)
- Comment (disambiguation)
