= History of education in Trzebiatów =

Town in the West Pomeranian Voivodeship, Poland

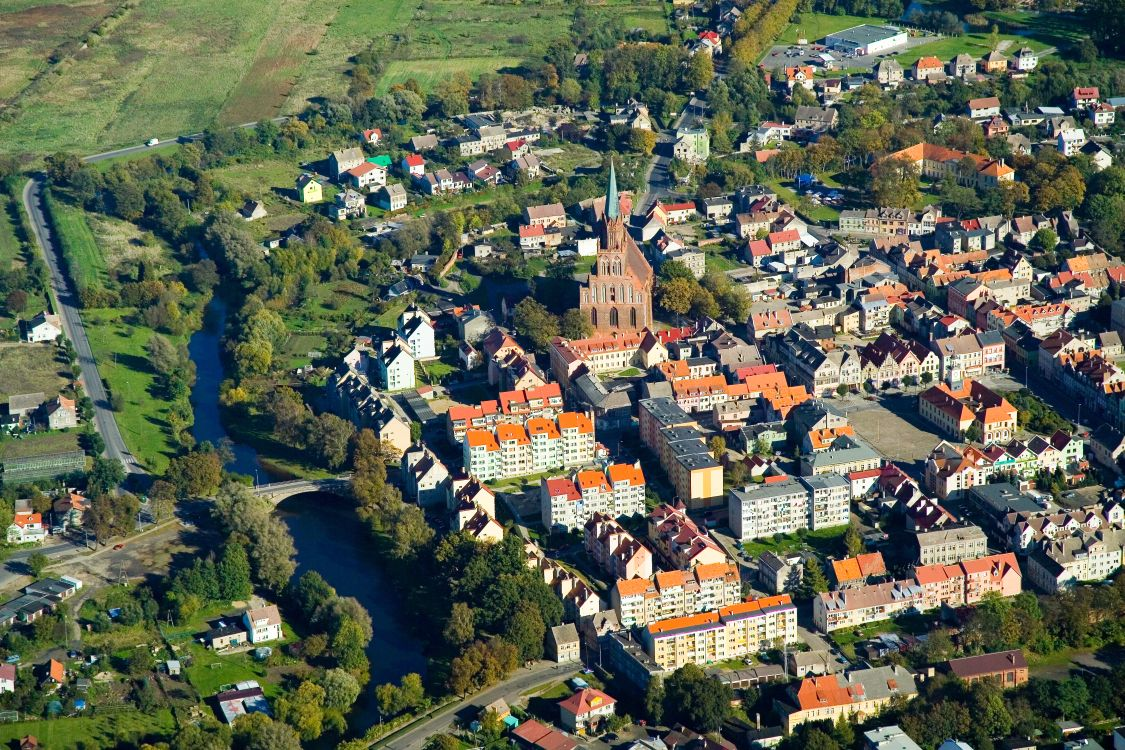
Trzebiatów from a bird's eye view

The history of education in Trzebiatów spans from the first half of the 14th century to contemporary times.

In larger population centers, the development of education was tailored to local, church, and state needs. Over the centuries, various types of schools emerged in Trzebiatów, including Latin schools (from 14th to 19th century), particular schools (16th century), foundation schools (18th century), elementary schools, schools for the poor, a gymnasium (19th century), secondary schools (20th century), private schools, and the so-called clandestine schools (up to 1734).

Educational reforms carried out by the Kingdom of Prussia in the 18th century introduced compulsory schooling for children aged 5 to 12. Until the 19th century, schools primarily educated boys. As a result of reforms in 1800, the first girls' school was established in Trzebiatów, followed by coeducational institutions. From 1887, the German Empire implemented a centralized management system, transforming schools into state institutions.

After 1945, Polish education developed in Trzebiatów. Compulsory schooling and centralized management of educational development were introduced. By the educational reform of 1999, the town had established primary, secondary, and vocational schools. This reform also led to the creation of gymnasiums and upper secondary schools. Additionally, private schooling and education for working individuals expanded.

== Decline of the Middle Ages ==
=== First source mentions ===
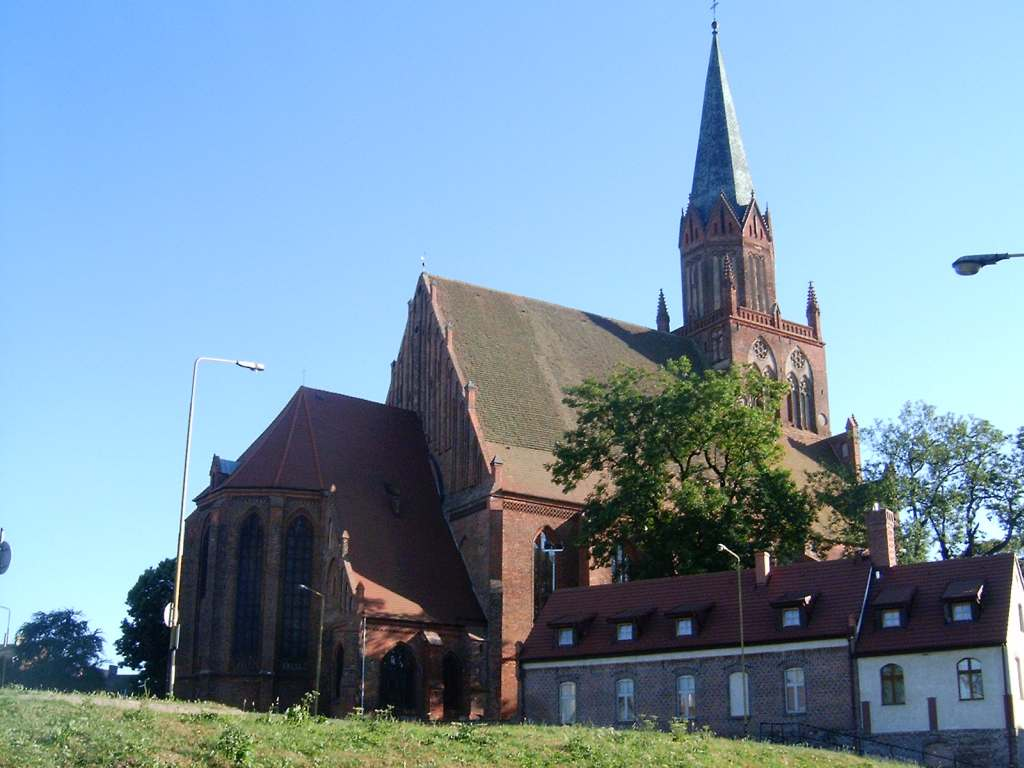
Latin school was located by St. Mary's Church until 1830/1832

The first mention of an educational institution in Trzebiatów comes from a document issued by Abbot Arnold of Białoboki, dated 29 November 1328. This document refers to the construction of St. Mary's Church and the foundation of a school. The abbot, along with the municipal council, reserved the right to influence the appointment of the school's rector. This patronage continued until the secularization of the monastery in 1521. The school rector also served as a reader at the abbey. A minor mention is found in a document dated 6 December 1354, issued by Johannes, Bishop of Kamień, regarding a pension for the Norbertine monastery in Białoboki from the village of Roby, purchased by Ludolf Webelen. Part of this pension financed the school's activities.

=== Latin school ===
The Latin school in Trzebiatów, established in the 14th century, was intended for the sons of the town's patriciate. Its aim was to prepare young people for work in trade and the town magistrate. The townspeople of Trzebiatów sought to ensure that their descendants received an education that extended beyond the ecclesiastical training norms. Therefore, they intended to establish a type of secular school. However, this project was never realized due to the lack of consent from church authorities, who at that time claimed the exclusive right to establish schools. A compromise allowed for the organization of education in Trzebiatów at the middle, lower, and lowest levels.

The Latin school's curriculum was based on the seven liberal arts. The first stage of education included writing and reading, Latin grammar, and familiarization with classical works. The second stage included instruction in rhetoric and dialectic (known as trivium, which, along with grammar, constituted the lower level of education), arithmetic, geometry, music, and astronomy (known as quadrivium, the higher level). Additionally, due to the education of the wealthy bourgeois youth, the curriculum was expanded to include geography and elements of law. Latin remained the language of instruction.

== Early modern period ==
=== Activities of Johannes Bugenhagen ===
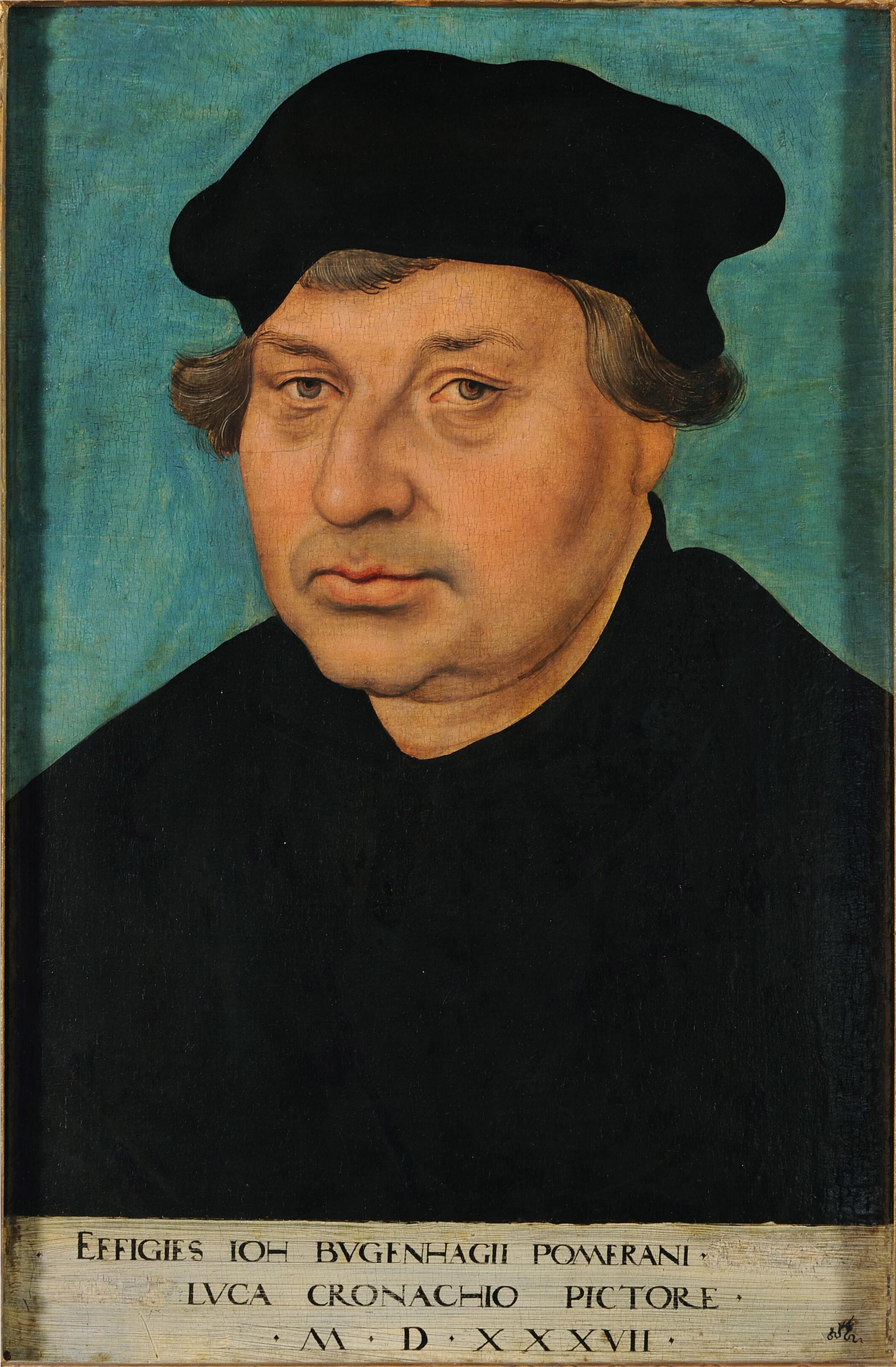
Johannes Bugenhagen, rector of the Latin school in Trzebiatów

The peak period of Trzebiatów's school occurred when Johannes Bugenhagen served as its rector. In mid-1504, through the intervention of Abbot H. von Beggerow of the Norbertines, Bugenhagen arrived in Trzebiatów and took charge of the town school. He held this position continuously until 1517, with a brief interruption until 1521. Bugenhagen's work was supported by A. Knöpke, G. Bugenhagen (Johannes' brother), and J. Lorichius. The rector expanded the curriculum, which gained wide interest; he lectured on the First and Second Epistles to Timothy and the Psalms, and introduced students to humanistic studies. Students began arriving in Trzebiatów from regions such as Westphalia and Livonia (modern-day Lithuania and Latvia).

In 1517, at the initiative of Abbot J. Boldewan, the Collegium presbiterorum sive sacerdotum (College of Priests) was established at the Białoboki Monastery. Bugenhagen was appointed as a lecturer. His lectures were marked by anti-clericalism and new theological theories. He expressed disappointment with the church institution in his sermons, which became evident in 1521 when he openly left the church after becoming acquainted with the works of Martin Luther. He propagated the new teachings among students and clergy. That same year, he left Trzebiatów for Wittenberg. Many new followers of the Reformation left the town and later contributed to spreading it in Pomerania. Trzebiatów became a major center of Reformation thought, especially after the Trzebiatów Parliament session on 13 December 1534, where the introduction of Lutheranism in Pomerania was approved.

=== Church and administrative ordinance ===
At the beginning of 1535, work began on a new church ordinance for the Duchy of Pomerania. The general provisions contained in Die Kerken – Ordenige des gantzen Pamerlandes regulated church, administrative, and educational relations in the duchy. Chapter V of the document was dedicated to educational matters.

The ordinance envisaged the establishment of so-called particular schools in larger urban centers. A minimum of three teachers (rector and baccalaureus) were to be employed, with funding for the institutions coming from church funds. School principals were to be appointed by municipal councils along with deacons and pastors. It was proposed to establish educational institutions at cathedrals, which would teach both Latin and German, along with writing, reading, prayer, catechism, and singing skills. These institutions were to be managed by rectors. Coordination of the work of Latin and German schools was also recommended.

=== School ordinance ===
In 1556, during the synod in Greifswald, work began on a new ordinance that included the expansion of Pomeranian education. This work was completed in 1563, and the document was issued two years later.

The school in Trzebiatów was located on the northeast side of St. Mary's Church. The massive building housed five classrooms and an apartment for the rector. The school operated under the patronage of the municipal council, according to the 1563 ordinance and the later school ordinance for Trzebiatów, Ordo scholae Treptoviensis ad Regam, issued in 1594. High standards were set for teachers. They were required to have a university-level education and the approval of the local pastor and church council. In the 1590s, the school employed three teachers: a rector, a cantor, and a hypodidascalus. The rector at that time was Joachim Teske. Teachers' salaries ranged from 16 to 60 guilders. Additionally, they were entitled to an annual bonus (4 guilders) and the so-called Holzgeld (from 6 to 8 groszy per student).

School classes were held from Monday to Saturday, from 6 AM to 3 PM, in both summer and winter systems. On Wednesdays, classes began with a mass and were shortened to 10 AM. Exams were held on Sundays. Besides Latin, Greek was also taught. Commonly used textbooks in Pomerania included Religion die Catechesis D. Chytraeusa, Dialogi sacri Castellii, Luther's Catechism, F. Melanchton's Lateinische Grammatik, and works by Cicero, Terence, and Ovid.

During the Thirty Years' War, teaching at the Trzebiatów school was disrupted. Financial problems due to contributions imposed on the town by imperial troops (1630, 1636, and 1648) led to frequent suspensions of the school's activities. The incorporation of Trzebiatów into Brandenburg-Prussia following the Peace of Westphalia, signed in 1648 in Osnabrück, did not cause significant changes in the curriculum. The so-called Latin model of education based on religious upbringing remained in place until the end of the 18th century.

=== Prussian education system ===
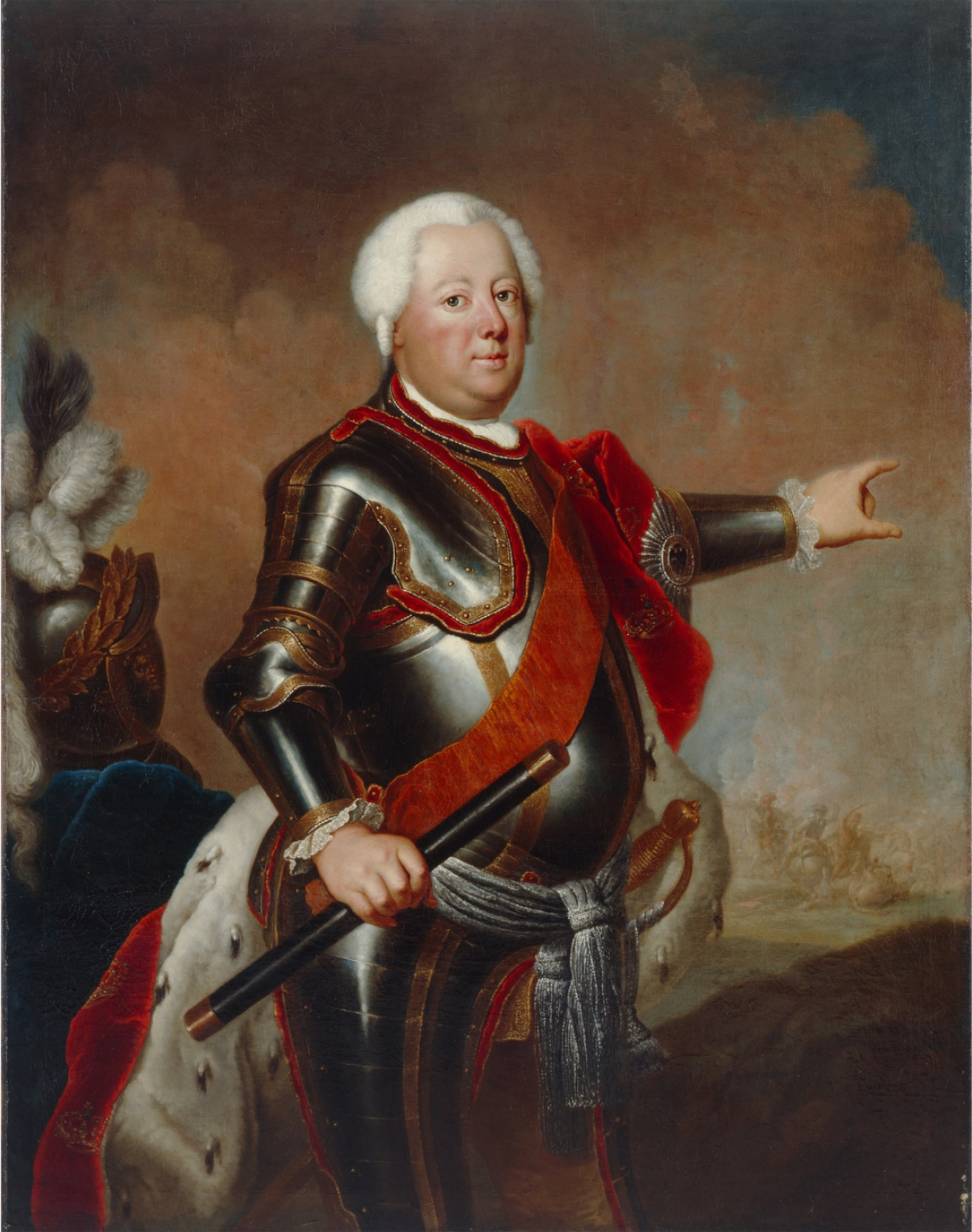
Frederick William, Prussian education reformer

Changes occurred in the Prussian education system in 1717, 1735, and 1763. Royal edicts introduced compulsory schooling for children from 5 to 12 years old. This obligation only applied to towns (including villages) with existing schools. The edict issued by Frederick William I in 1734 included mandatory winter (daily) and summer (once or twice a week) schooling. The school reform revealed imperfections. The shortage of qualified teaching staff was supplemented by unqualified workers, particularly former soldiers and disabled people.

The reforms also addressed the existing method of school funding. Each school received initial capital, granting them legal personality. Following the school reform in Trzebiatów, it was decided to abolish the existing "clandestine" school (German: Winkelschule). Sources do not indicate when it was established in the town, but it is known that such (private) institutions existed in Pomerania from the mid-15th century. They taught basic writing and reading skills with limited religious knowledge. This school was closed in 1734 at the request of the then rector Erasmus B. Egerland. Another aspect of creating a new education system was addressing the needs of the town's poorest class. A record from the 1730s mentions that Martin G. von Beggerow built a building at Kirchstrasse No. 412 in Trzebiatów for a foundation school for 20 poor children (German: Stiftungsschule). He also bequeathed 20 thalers for its maintenance in his will (1739). The funds were to be managed by St. Mary's Church.

In the 18th-century Trzebiatów school, textbooks included Allgemeine heilige und weltliche Geschichte by Hardion, Geographie by Phennings, Naturlehre and Naturgeschichte by J. J. Ebert, Grammatik by Langen, and works by Cornelius Nepos, along with Cicero's letters and De rebus gestis Alexandri Magni by Quintus Curtius Rufus. Classes began at 7 AM and lasted with breaks until 5 PM (Monday to Friday). Besides mandatory prayer, singing was taught, Bible passages were read to the children, and exercises in German and Latin (grammar) were conducted, as well as instruction in orthography and calligraphy. Classes were also held on Saturdays. Besides prayer and mandatory Gospel reading, lessons in morality, principles of faith, and arithmetic were conducted.

== Modern era ==
=== New education system ===
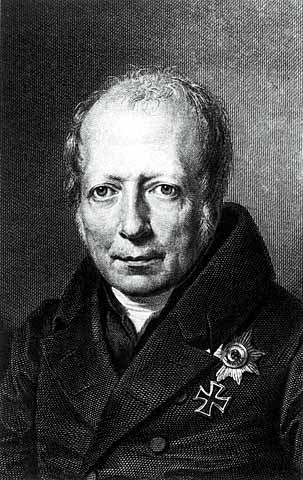
Wilhelm von Humboldt

In 1800, Prussia introduced a new education system designed by Wilhelm von Humboldt. This system established compulsory education for children at the elementary level and introduced a three-tier structure consisting of general elementary schools (German: allgemeine Volksschule), secondary schools (German: höhere Schule), and higher education institutions (German: Hochschule). Elementary schools provided education in German, religion, arithmetic, natural sciences, geography, history, calligraphy, drawing, and singing. Secondary schools prepared students for university studies. A significant aspect of this reform was the removal of the new education system from church control.

==== School reorganization ====
In 1815, a folk school (German: Volksschule) was established in Trzebiatów, later renamed an elementary school (German: Elementarschule). The school was headed by a rector who also served as a preacher in St. Mary's Church. The existing Latin school was transformed into a große Ratschule, which included three classes, and in the 1830s, it was further transformed into a höhere Bürgerschule or höhere Realschule. Students were examined every September, receiving report cards and scholarships if they excelled.

In 1824, a new regulation added a fourth class, and in 1832, a fifth class, shifting the school's focus to preparing students for gymnasiums. In the 1830s, the school moved to a new building, formerly a manufactory. The foundation school established by M. Beggerow in the 18th century was converted in 1826 into a school for the poor (German: Allgemeine städtische Armenschule). A new building was constructed on Papenstrasse, containing a teacher's apartment, learning spaces, and a barn. The school for the poor was a three-year institution employing four teachers, funded by a special city treasury. A girls' school, a so-called middle girls' school (German: Mädchenschule), was also established and later renamed a höhere Töchterschule. It employed six teachers and taught good manners and needlework.

=== Establishment of the gymnasium ===
In 1851, the town authorities began efforts to transform the existing höhere Bürgerschule into a gymnasium. This new type of school was established in 1855, named after Johann Bugenhagen. Its character and operation were governed by school instructions and statutes from 1856 and 1857. The teaching staff formed on 30 March 1857 consisted of eight teachers. Dr. Robert Geier became the prorector and principal. The gymnasium was located at a new site on Woldeckenstrasse (now Wodna Street), with the construction costing approximately 42,000 thalers, funded by the city treasury. The official opening took place on 30 September 1858. The school also had a boarding house (Latin: alumnare) built in 1862, which served both residential and educational purposes. The institution was under the patronage of a curatorium comprising the town mayor, gymnasium principal, pastor, two magistrate members, and two town residents.

The school initially included five gymnasium classes (later seven) and two preparatory classes (later three). According to records, in 1860, there were 211 students, 79 of whom took the first matura exams. The curriculum focused on Latin and Greek, with additional subjects such as German, French, religion, history, geography, and mathematics. The students received secondary education (after six classes), without the right to continue at the university level. In 1881, the school employed 15 teachers, including a principal, prorector, cantor, three senior teachers (German: Oberlehrer), five ordinary teachers (German: ordentlicher Lehrer), an assistant teacher (German: Hilfslehrer), and subject-specific teachers (technical, drawing, and gymnastics).

Due to educational reforms, schools came under the central management of the German Empire (from 1886 to 1887). The state committed to transferring ownership of school buildings and library collections to the local gymnasium, building a new gymnasium hall, and funding the institution with 12,000 Deutsche Marks annually. Archival data from 1906 indicates that the Trzebiatów gymnasium was considered prestigious. By 1906, 47 works authored by the school's teachers had been published, including philosophical dissertations. Up to that year, 657 students had completed the matura exam, with graduates from Brandenburg, Berlin, other Prussian provinces, and foreign countries such as the Indian Empire, England, and Switzerland.

== Recent history ==
=== From 1918 to 1945 ===
The state of education in Trzebiatów from 1918 to 1945 remained largely unchanged from the period between 1887 and 1918 period. Post-World War I sources lack detailed information about the schools, except for the gymnasium, and mention the existence of institutions such as the Rural Household School and the Police School. In 1926, the Police School was downgraded to a progymnasium, operating only six classes. The matura exams were suspended due to limited facilities and financial constraints. The number of faculty members also decreased. A positive development during this time was the electrification of the school, although electricity was used sparingly during the winter to save costs. In 1928, Trzebiatów celebrated the 600th anniversary of education, with the progymnasium and city authorities organizing the festivities. The school prided itself on its continuous educational tradition, tracing back to the old Latin school.

In the 1930s, youth associations such as the Rowing Association (German: Ruderverein) and the Gymnastics Association (German: Turnverein) were active in the Bugenhagen Realprogymnasium. These associations included most of the students and the school had facilities like tennis courts, a sports field, and a gymnasium. Interest clubs, such as theatrical groups, were also formed. During this period, the school became coeducational, admitting girls, although they were a small minority of the 127 students in 1932. Efforts were made to reorganize the school and restore its gymnasium status from before 1926. In 1937, the Nazi Germany made amendments to the education system, leading to the establishment of a secondary school (German: Oberschule) in Trzebiatów.

World War II caused a gradual suspension of school activities in Trzebiatów. The shortage of basic food supplies and utilities (water, electricity, and natural gas) disrupted the functioning of educational and cultural institutions. On 7 August 1943, people were relocated from the Ruhr area (cities of Bochum and Herne) to Trzebiatów due to the war. Among the evacuees were students and teachers, who were accommodated in many rooms of the secondary school. In early 1945, the evacuation of the city began. Although more than 600 Germans remained in the city after the war, German schools ceased to operate officially. The secondary school building was used as an infectious diseases hospital by the Red Army until 1947.

=== Development of education after 1945 ===
After World War II, the new residents of Trzebiatów faced numerous challenges in terms of provisioning, housing, and communication. However, within the first post-war year, they managed to lay the foundations for the efficient functioning of the city, including its education system. A plan for the future school network was developed based on the technical condition of the buildings. The city authorities emphasized securing school properties, which were susceptible to vandalism and theft. On 24 August 1945, following the directive of the Minister of Education from 30 May 1945, the School Inspectorate conducted a census of children subject to compulsory education.

==== Primary and secondary education ====
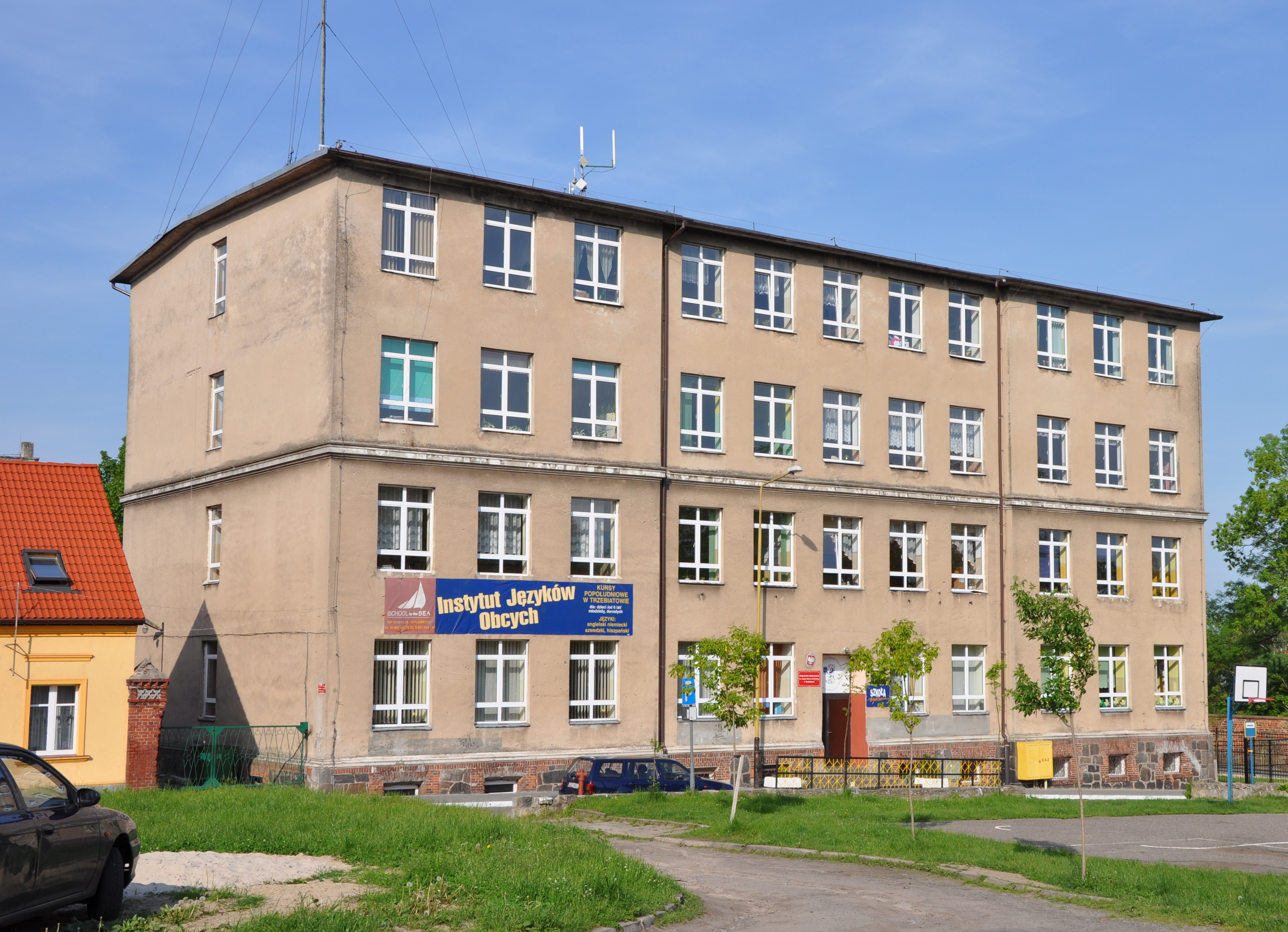
Public Gymnasium of the Dukes of Western Pomerania

Polish education in Trzebiatów began on 1 September 1945, although classes started with a three-day delay. There were 112 students taught by four teachers. The pioneers of the Trzebiatów Public School included Stefan Turkowski (school principal), Włodzimierz Gryżak, and Stanisława and Alfons Tafelski. The institution was a 7-year school (Note: School reform (1961) introduced a uniform 8-year primary education system throughout the country. Until 1961, only the larger cities had 8-year schools.) located in the former German school building at 2 Szkolna Street and also served as the cultural center of the city. The school faced many difficulties in its early years, primarily the lack of textbooks and teaching aids. Initially, classes were conducted in 7 classrooms (which increased to 12 a year later). Numerous activities infused with communist slogans were conducted to engage the students.

In the 1948/1949 school year, due to the efforts of the school administration, the school was moved to the building of the former secondary school at 2 Wodna Street. The relocation was necessary due to the large number of students (the institution acquired a gymnasium built through community effort between 1966 and 1972). In 1956, a school with Ukrainian as the language of instruction began operating on the premises for ten years. Two years later, the Ukrainian Social and Cultural Society requested the establishment of an independent 11-year school, but the lack of space halted the project.

In the 1950s, Trzebiatów experienced a significant population increase. (Note: Statistics show that the population has increased by more than 2,000 people.) Consequently, city authorities decided to build a new school building, completed in 1959 at Długa Street (now the First Polish Army Primary School No. 2). The Public School was then renamed Primary School No. 1 (named after Jan Kochanowski in 1980).

Initially, the Primary School No. 2 had 12 classrooms, a library, two workshops, a sports field, a track, and a gymnasium. The school was intended for a maximum of 400 students, but in its first year, it admitted 647 children. To improve the educational situation, a branch of the school was established in nearby Jaromin, which conducted classes for the first stage of education (grades from I to III) in 1968. According to the 1961 education reform, these schools became 8-year institutions.

In the early 1960s, a major renovation of the Primary School No. 1 building began. It was decided that classes would take place in four temporary buildings (by the 1990s, they were located on Daszyńskiego, Szkolna, and Wodna streets. After 2003, it moved to 16 Kamieniecka Street).

In 1974, the Collective Municipal School was established in Trzebiatów, comprising 17 facilities in the municipality (6 schools, 8 branches, and 3 kindergartens). Collective Municipal School was established by a decree from the Department of Education and Upbringing in Gryfice on 25 July 1974. Collective Municipal School's guidelines aimed to provide all students with appropriate healthcare, nutrition, transportation to schools and cultural facilities, and to develop artistic talents and interests.

In 1999, as a result of the education reform, the Public Gymnasium of the Dukes of Western Pomerania was established in Trzebiatów, located at 2 Wodna Street (the building was previously used by Primary School No. 1 before the reform).

==== Vocational education ====
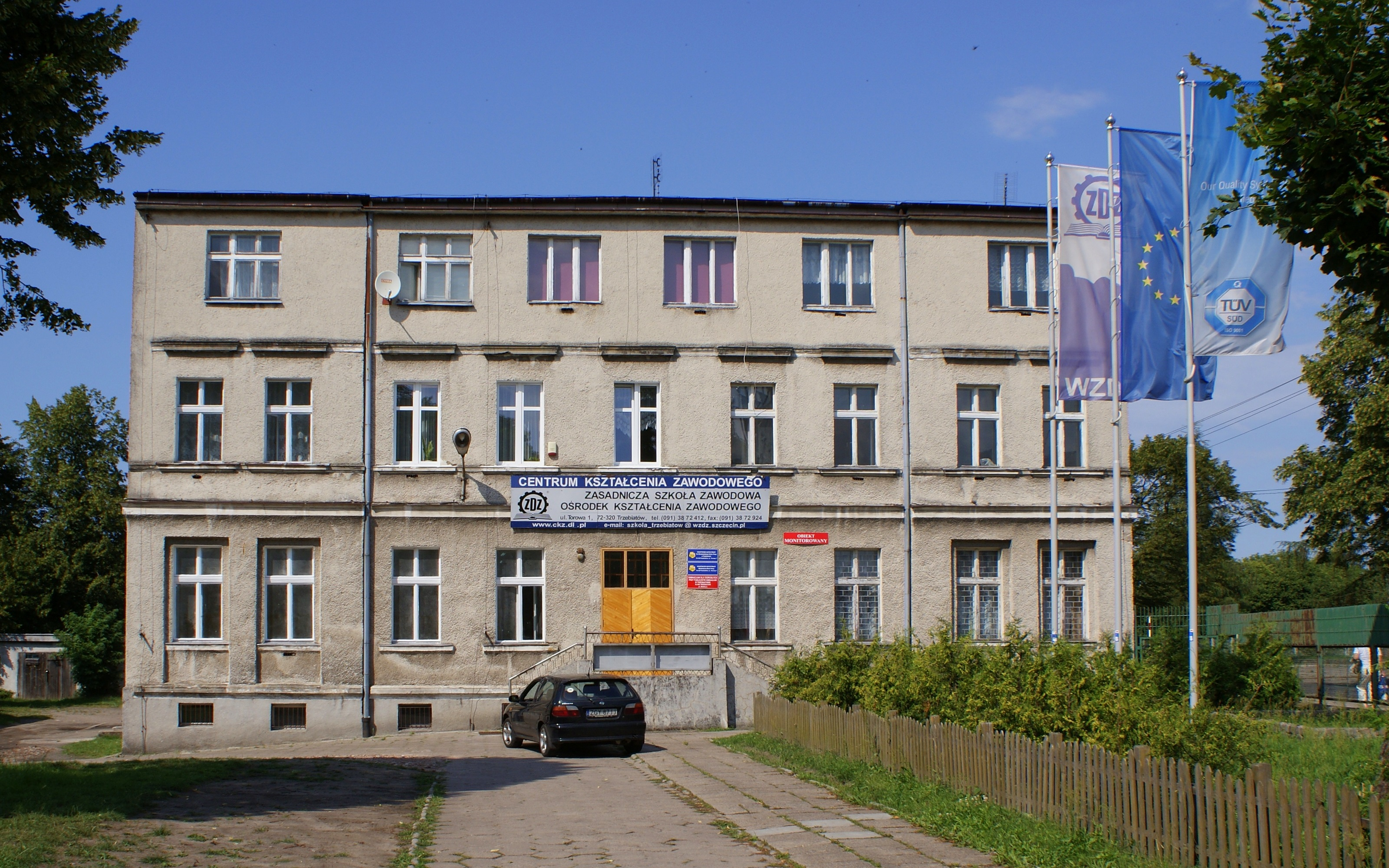
Vocational School in Trzebiatów

In 1949, Trzebiatów established its first vocational school, the Administrative and Commercial High School, which was later transformed into the Administrative and Commercial Technical School. However, this institution had a short lifespan and was relocated to Barlinek. In 1950, a Vocational School (focused on electrical and metalwork, later turning into a lathe and locksmith specialization) was established in the vacated school building at 2 Szkolna Street.

By the mid-1950s, the school had moved to a building located at 15 Lipowy Square, which was well-equipped with teaching aids. The range of vocational training was expanded to include agricultural mechanization, mechanics of agricultural machinery, industrial machinery and equipment, as well as vocational classes for bakers, butchers, waiters, electricians, and salespeople. The school had training workshops that were partially converted into school laboratories after the education reform.

On 1 January 1954, the Craft Improvement Facility was established, based on several artisanal service workshops. These points employed up to three practical vocational training instructors. On 1 September 1959, the Vocational School of the Union of Vocational Improvement Facilities was established at 1 Torowa Street. This school functioned as a branch of the Provincial Vocational Improvement Facility School in Szczecin until 1981. Afterward, it became an independent institution, training students in trades such as locksmith-mechanic, locksmith-welder, furniture carpenter, construction painter, and sanitary installation fitter. In 1983, a Vocational Preparation School was established, offering courses in mechanics and masonry. In 2000, a Vocational High School with a carpentry specialization was founded.

In 1965, the Mechanical Technical School (a 5-year school) was inaugurated in Trzebiatów. It provided education in areas such as metal cutting and agricultural mechanization and had a dormitory to accommodate non-local students. In 1973, a 3-year Mechanical Technical School for working students was established. In the 1990s, a General Secondary School was created within the Mechanical Technical School, leading to the institution being renamed as the School Complex. In 2002, the Zbigniew Herbert Upper Secondary School Complex was established, encompassing General Secondary Schools, Profiled Secondary Schools, Supplementary Secondary Schools, and Vocational Schools.

==== Adult education ====
Adult education in Trzebiatów traces its roots back to the 1940s when efforts to combat illiteracy began in the post-war years. Initially, special courses and supplementary education at the primary school level were conducted until 1951. In the 1962/1963 school year, a branch of the General Secondary School for Working Adults in Gryfice was established in Trzebiatów to provide secondary education. This school did not have its own building and was initially located in the Mechanical Technical School building, later moving to Primary School No. 1 in the 1970s. In the mid-1990s, based on the Vocational School, a private school was established a 3-year Evening General Secondary School (now a Correspondence General Secondary School), which operates in the School Complex building.

== Bibliography ==
- Berghaus, H. (1870). Landbuch des Herzogthums Pommern und des Fürstenhums Rügen Enthaltend Schilderung der Zustände dieser Lande in der zweiten Hälfte des 19 Jahrhunderts (in German). Vol. VI. Anklam: Bayerische Staatsbibliothek.
- Bülow, G. (1880). Beiträge zur Geschichte des pommerschen Schulwesens im 16. Jahrhundert (in German). Szczecin: Verl. der K. Akad.
- Tracz, R. (2005). "Rozwój szkolnictwa w Trzebiatowie po 1945 roku". In Kochanowska, J. (ed.). Trzebiatów – spotkania pomorskie – 2004 r. (in Polish). Szczecin: Oficyna In Plus. ISBN 83-89402-33-5.
- Wesołowska, S. (2001). "Szkic do dziejów szkolnictwa w Trzebiatowie od XIV wieku do czasów współczesnych". In Łysiak, Wojciech (ed.). Trzebiatów – historia i kultura II (in Polish). Poznań: Wydawnictwo "Eco". ISBN 83-87437-08-5.
- Cieśliński, Antoni. "Powiat gryficki" (PDF) (in Polish). Archived from the original (PDF) on 2014-09-05.
