= Commentary =

Commentary or commentaries may refer to:

== Publications ==
- Commentary (magazine), a U.S. public affairs journal, founded in 1945 and formerly published by the American Jewish Committee
- Caesar's Commentaries (disambiguation), a number of works attributed to Julius Caesar
- Commentaries of Ishodad of Merv, set of ninth-century Syriac treatises on the Bible
- Commentaries on the Laws of England, a 1769 treatise on the common law of England by Sir William Blackstone
- Commentaries on Living, a series of books by Jiddu Krishnamurti originally published in 1956, 1958 and 1960
- Moralia in Job, a sixth-century treatise by Saint Gregory
- Commentary of Zuo, one of the earliest Chinese works of narrative history, covering the period from 722 to 468 BCE
- Commentaries, a work attributed to Taautus

== Religions ==
- Atthakatha, commentaries on the Pāli Canon in Theravāda Buddhism
  - Sub-commentaries (Theravāda), commentaries on the commentaries on the Pali Canon of Theravada Buddhism
- Exegesis, a critical explanation or interpretation of a text, especially a religious text (e.g. a Bible commentary)
- Tafsir, an exegesis, or commentary, of the Quran
- List of biblical commentaries
- Jewish commentaries on the Bible

== Other uses ==
- Published opinion piece material, in any of several forms:
  - An editorial, written by the editorial staff or board of a newspaper, magazine, or other periodical
  - Column (periodical), a regular feature of such a publication in which usually the same single writer offers advice, observation, or other commentary
  - An op-ed, an opinion piece by an author unaffiliated with the publication
  - Letters to the editor, written by readers of such a publication
  - Posts made in the comments section of an online publication, serving a similar function to paper periodicals' letters to the editor
- Commentary (philology), a line-by-line or even word-by-word explication (and usually translation) of a text
- Audio commentary track for DVDs and Blu-Rays – an additional audio track that plays in real-time with the video material, and comments on that video
- Sports commentary or play-by-play, a running description of a game or event in real time, usually during a live broadcast
  - Color commentary, supplementing play-by-play commentary, often filling in any time when play is not in progress
- Criticism, the practice of judging the merits and faults of something or someone
- Textual Criticism, the production of scientifically reliable editions of historical texts
- Commentary! The Musical, the musical commentary accompanying Dr. Horrible's Sing-Along Blog
- Commentary or narration, the words in a documentary film
- Literary criticism, the study, evaluation, and interpretation of literature
  - Close reading in literary criticism, the careful, sustained interpretation of a brief passage of text
- Political criticism or political commentary, criticism that is specific of or relevant to politics
  - Public commentary received by governmental and other bodies, e.g. in response to proposals, reports, etc.

== See also ==
- Commentry, a place in central France
- Comment (disambiguation)
- Commentaire, a French quarterly
- Reaction video, commentaries in video format
