= Remark =

Remark may refer to:

- Remark Media, a digital media and social media company
- Erich Paul Remark (1898–1970) a.k.a. Erich Maria Remarque, a German novelist

== See also ==
- Comment (disambiguation)
