= Internet (disambiguation) =

The Internet is a global system of interconnected computer networks.

Internet may also refer to:

== Companies ==
- Internet Co., Ltd., a Japanese software company

== Arts and entertainment ==
- The Internet (band), a soul music band
- Internet – O Filme, a 2017 Brazilian comedy film
- "The Internet" (Room 104), a 2017 television episode
- "Internet", a song by Post Malone from Hollywood's Bleeding (2019)
- "Internet", a song by Lizzo featuring Tierra Whack from My Face Still Hurts from Smiling (2025)

== Other uses ==
- Internet (web browser), by Amazon
- "Internets", a catchphrase to portray someone as ignorant about technology
- International Project Management Association, known as INTERNET before 1996; see Association for Project Management

== See also ==
- Internet protocol suite, a computer networking model
- Internetwork, any system of interconnected networks
- Private network, referred to in RFC 1918 as "private internets"
- Intranet, a computer network within an organization
- Internet2, a consortium that develops high bandwidth network applications
