= Comment spam =

Comment spam is a term referencing a broad category of spambot or spammer postings which abuse web-based forms to post unsolicited advertisements as comments on forums, blogs, wikis and online guestbooks. Related topics include:

- Forum spam, posts on Internet forums that contains related or unrelated advertisements, links to malicious websites, and abusive or otherwise unwanted information
- Newsgroup spam, a type of spam where the targets are Usenet newsgroups
- Social spam, unwanted spam content appearing on social networks and any website with user-generated content
- Spam in blogs, a form of spamdexing done by posting random comments, copied material, or promotion of commercial services
- Troll (Internet), a person who sows discord on the Internet
- Hit-and-run posting, a tactic where a poster at an Internet forum enters, makes a post, only to disappear immediately after
- Sockpuppet (Internet), an online identity used for purposes of deception
- Astroturfing, the practice of masking the sponsors of a message or organization

== See also ==
- Comment (disambiguation)
- State-sponsored Internet sockpuppetry
