= Oregon Commentator =

University of Oregon student publication (1983–2015)

- Cover of the January 31, 2012 issue of the Oregon Commentator
- Categories: Opinion, Political, Conservatism, Humor
- First issue: 27 September 1983
- Country: United States
- Based in: Eugene
- Website: oregoncommentator.com

The Oregon Commentator was a student publication at the University of Oregon in Eugene, Oregon, United States. Founded on September 27, 1983, and first published on October 24, 1983, it was a self-described "conservative journal of opinion," modeled after such publications as Harvard Lampoon, The Onion and Reason Magazine. The magazine's official ideological stance was conservative, although many of the ideas and values it promoted might be better described as libertarian.

The Commentator served as an independent journal of opinion for the campus community and provided students with an alternative to the predominant viewpoints of professors, student groups and other student publications. The magazine officially ceased operations at the culmination of the 2014–2015 academic year.

== History ==
The magazine was founded in the fall of 1983, primarily by Dane S. Claussen and Richard E. Burr. Claussen later became the editor and/or publisher of various US newspapers and magazines, and a journalism/media professor. He is now Director of Research, Publications, and Professional Advancement at the National Communication Association, and former executive director of the American Civil Liberties Union of Nevada. Burr is a long-time editor at The Detroit News. Other co-founders included Robert Davis and the late Michael Rust, in addition to faculty adviser Paul S. Holbo.

The Commentator was once the second-oldest publication on campus, following the Oregon Daily Emerald. It was also a member of the Collegiate Network, a group of conservative and libertarian college publications. The magazine was operated as part of the Associated Students of the University of Oregon (ASUO) and was staffed by volunteer editors and writers. It was funded through student incidental fees, advertising revenue and private donations. The Commentator's aim was to serve as a contrarian outlet for students resistant to the prevailing trends on campus, including opposition to the mandatory nature of the non-academic "incidental fee."

In addition to its periodic print edition, The Commentator published additional content on its website, where it also maintained a group-run blog frequently linked to by national news outlets. In 2008, the blog won second place in the America's Future Foundation's inaugural College Blogger Contest.

== Controversies ==
Since its inception, there were several attempts to shut down the magazine's operations. In 2004, the program lost its funding after satirizing a prominent transgender student. Its funding was restored soon after the Foundation for Individual Rights in Education became involved.

In 2006, then Editor in Chief Tyler Graf appeared on The O'Reilly Factor to defend the First Amendment rights of The Student Insurgent, a rival student publication. The Insurgent had received national attention after publishing controversial illustrations of Jesus Christ. Jethro Higgins, who was part of the opposition on campus hoping to shut down The Student Insurgent, also appeared on the program.

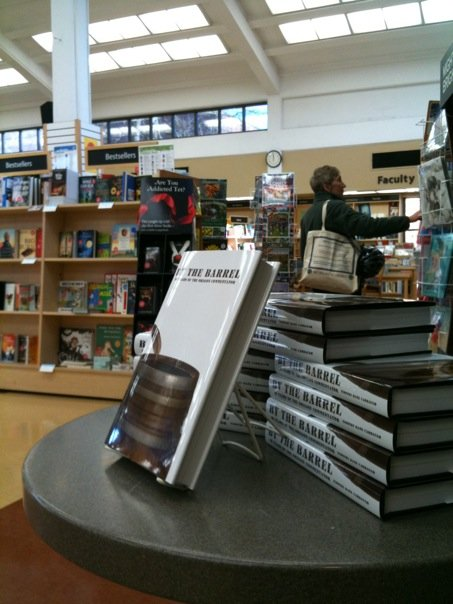
By the Barrel:25 Years of the Oregon Commentator on display at the University of Oregon Bookstore

== By the Barrel: 25 Years of the Oregon Commentator ==
In November 2009, The Oregon Commentator published By the Barrel: 25 Years of the Oregon Commentator. The book served as a culmination and celebration of the publication's 25th year at the University of Oregon. The book contains three sections:

- An overview of the publication's history.
- Retrospectives on nine key moments that involved attempted de-fundings, vandalism and other significant events.
- Ten essays written by Commentator alumni, including a foreword in honor of the 25th Anniversary.
