= Comment (TV series) =

- Genre: Talk show
- Presented by: George Baker
- Country of origin: Australia
- Original language: English

Original release
- Network: ATN-7
- Release: 1958 – 1960

Comment is an Australian television series which aired 1958 to 1960 on Sydney station ATN-7. In the series, George Baker interviewed prominent people. It aired in a single city only, typical of early Australian series. Archival status is not known.
