= Internet (web browser) =

Android web browser from Amazon

- Developer(s): Amazon
- Initial release: March 2018
- Operating system: Android
- Platform: Smartphones
- Available in: English
- Type: Web browser
- Website: Google Play

Internet (Full title: Internet, fast, lite and private) is a mobile web browser made by Amazon. It is aimed at India and other emerging markets. It is the second web browser by the company and is designed for the lower bandwidth environments that emerging markets face. As of April 2018 it is available for Android 5.0 and up in India only.
