= Friedrich Eberhard von Rochow =

Prussian educator (1734-1805)

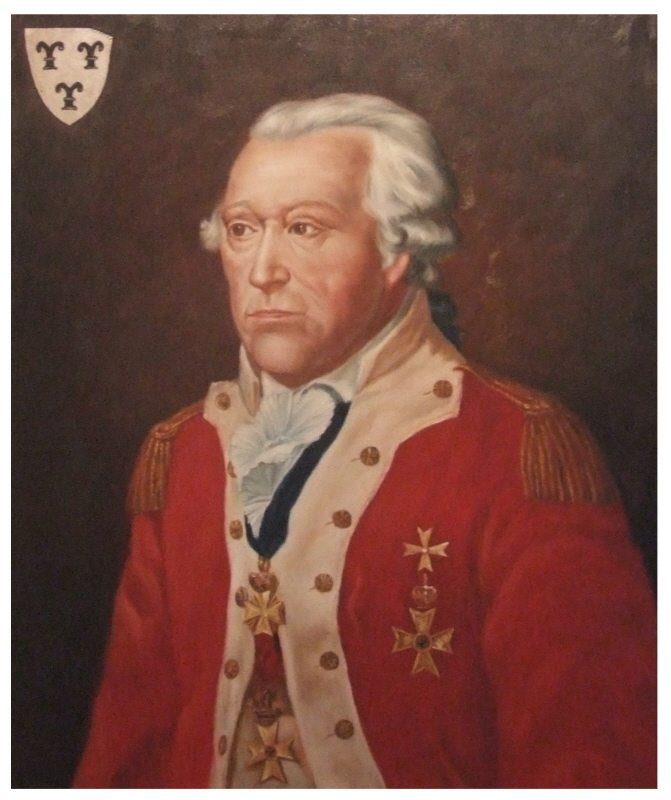
Portrait of F. E. v. Rochow (Schulmuseum Reckahn).

Friedrich Eberhard von Rochow (11 October 1734 - 16 May 1805) was a Prussian landowner and educator during the German Enlightenment, most notable for his philanthropic school reforms.

He came from a noble family, originally from Switzerland and first documented in 927, which had come to Brandenburg in the 11th century to fight the Wends and settled in what became the Margraviate of Brandenburg. The first estate they acquired in the Margraviate was Rochow.

== Life ==
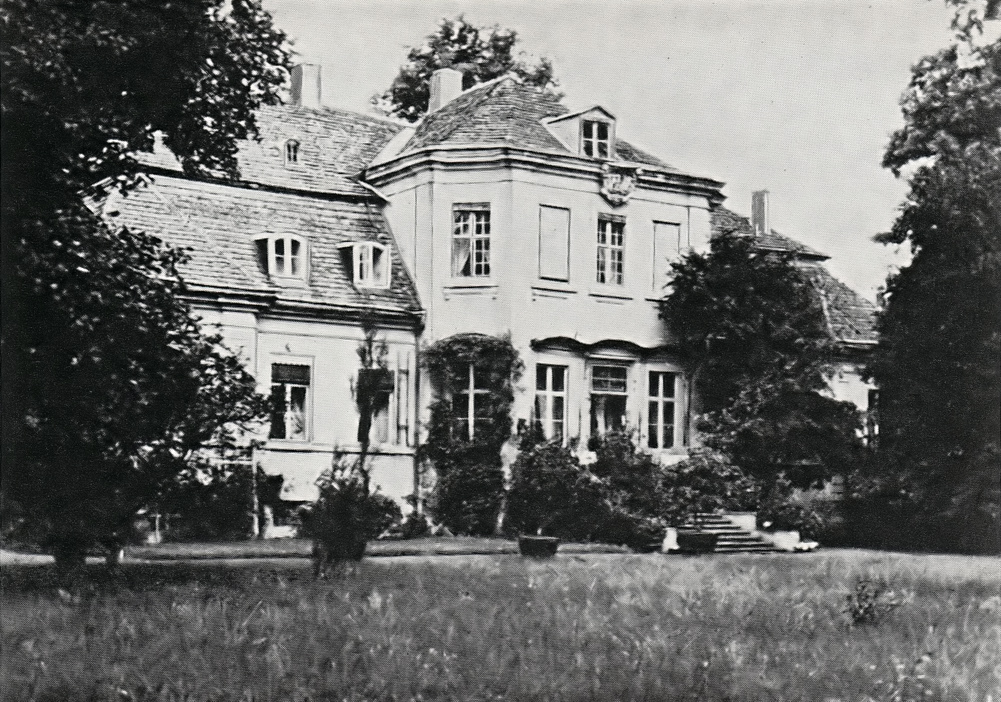
Schloss Reckahn, the family estate (c. 1920).

Born in Berlin, he was the son of the government minister Friedrich Wilhelm III. von Rochow (1690–1764) and his wife Friedericke Eberhardine, nee von Görne (1700–1760). After private tutoring and two years as pupil No. 473 in the Ritterakademie in the Dom district of Brandenburg an der Havel he joined the royal cavalry and fought as a lieutenant in the Garde du Corps during the first campaigns of the Seven Years' War. He was severely wounded in his left hand at the Battle of Lobositz and later in his right hand in a duel, which led to his leaving the army.

In 1759 he married Christiane Louise von Bose (1734–1808). He devoted himself to agricultural and scientific research from 1760 onwards and became a canon of Halberstadt in 1762 and put in charge of the charitable interests in the abbey's estates. The same year he was made a Knight of the Order of Saint John. Rochow was also a member of the Knighthood Council and director for the Mittelmark region, as part of the Kur- und Neumärkisches Ritterschaftliches Kreditinstitut (Electoral and New March Knighthood Credit Institution), founded in 1777.

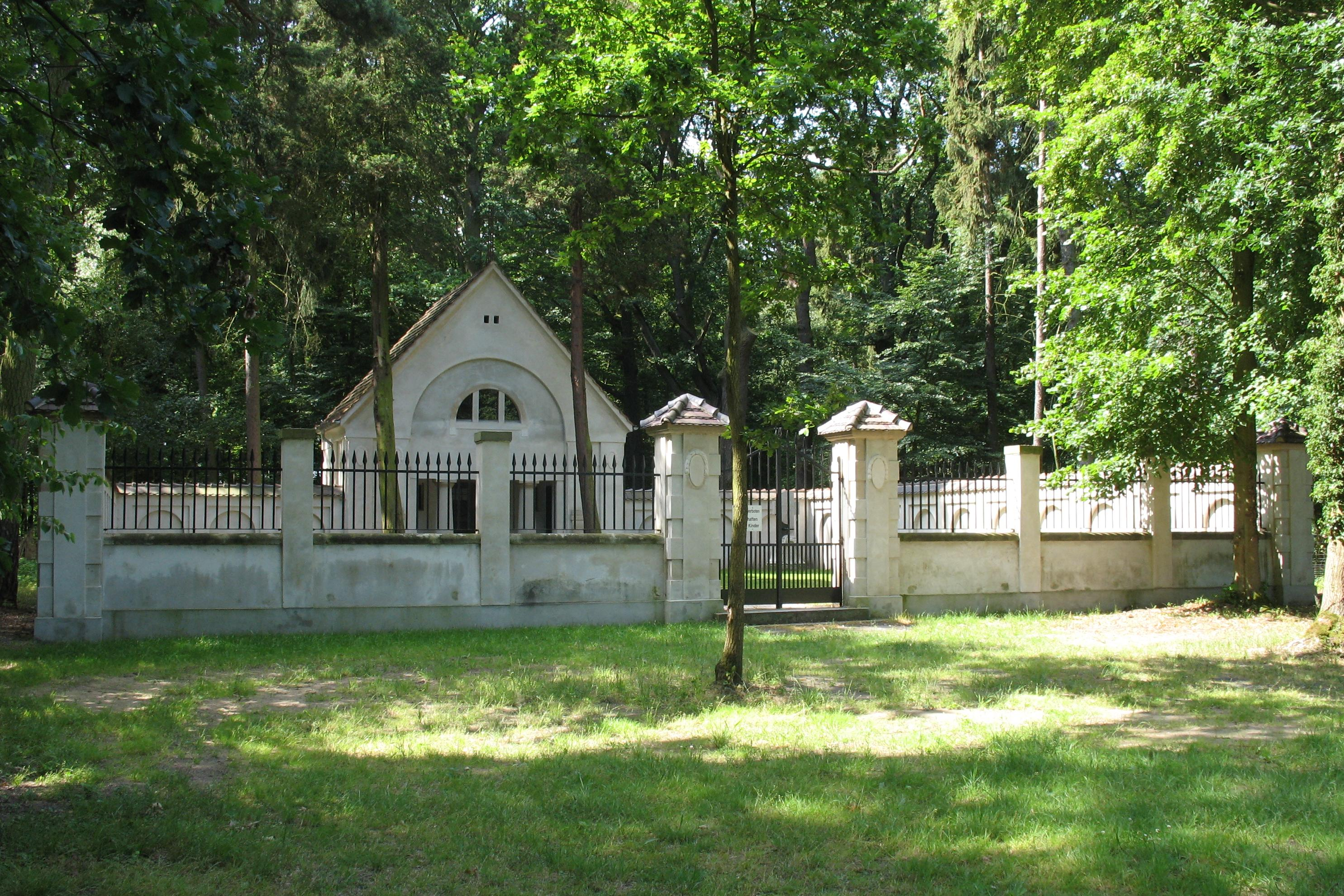
von Rochow family grave in Reckahn

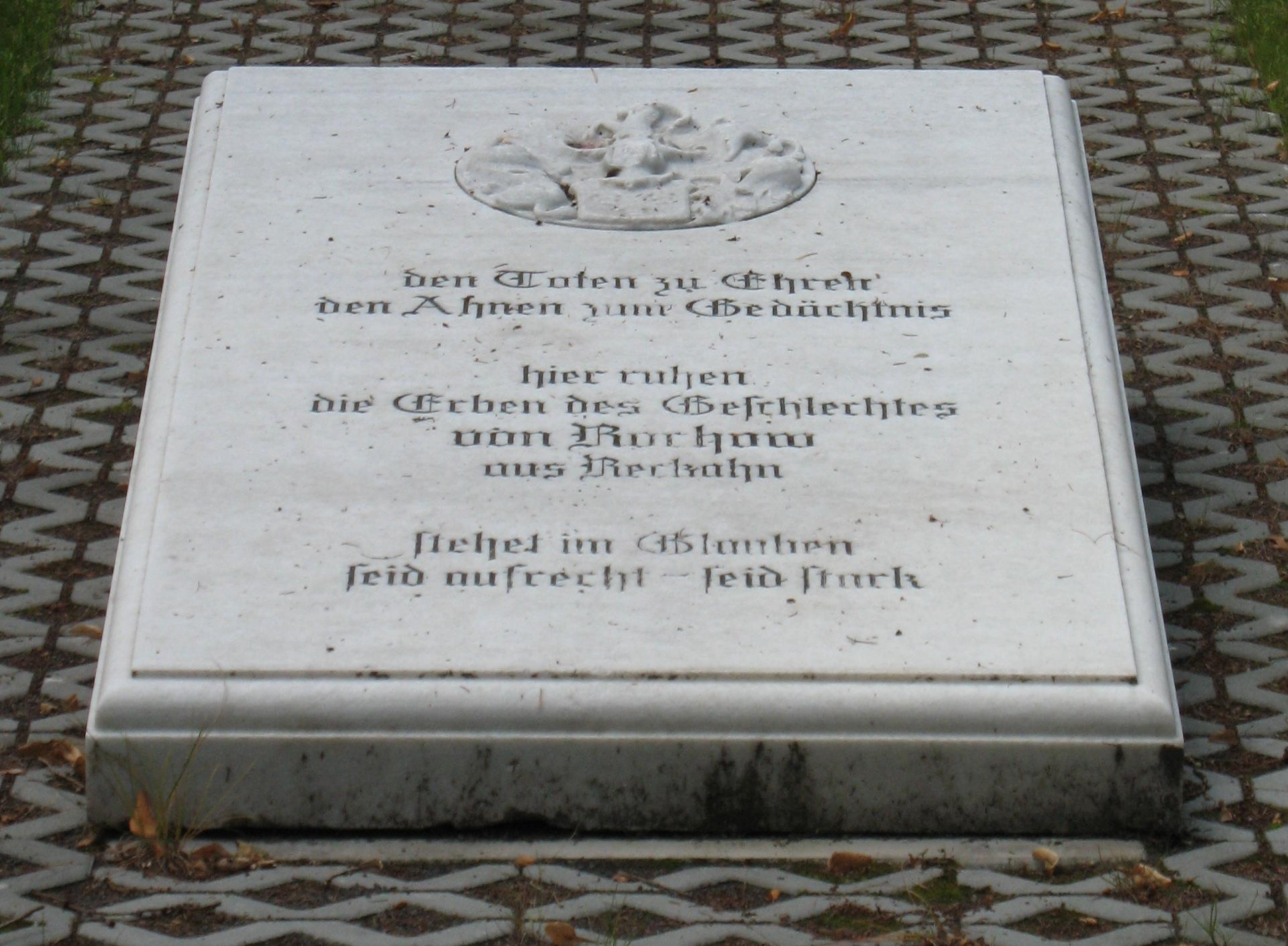
Gravestone on the family grave

== Namesakes ==
The following are named after him:

- Rochowstraße in the Friedrichshain district of Berlin
- Eberhard-von-Rochow-Straße in Offenbach
- the Rochow-Grundschule in Golzow
- the Freiherr-von-Rochow-Schule in Pritzwalk
- the Rochow-Wanderweg in Kloster Lehnin

== Selected works ==
- Schreiben eines Landwirts an die Bauern wegen Aufhebung der Gemeinheiten. Stendal 1769.
- Versuch eines Schulbuches, für Kinder der Landleute, oder zum Gebrauch in Dorfschulen Nicolai, Berlin 1772.
- Der Bauernfreund Brandenburg 1773.
- Stoff zum Denken über wichtige Angelegenheiten des Menschen. Braunschweig 1775.
- Der Kinderfreund. Ein Lesebuch zum Gebrauch in Landschulen. Gebrüder Halle, Brandenburg und Leipzig 1776. 1779: (Digitized)
- Vom Nationalcharakter durch Volksschulen. 1779.
- Der Kinderfreund. Zweyter Theil. Frankfurt 1779. (Digitized)
- Versuch eines Entwurfes zu einem deutschen Gesetzbuch nach christlichen Grundsätzen zum Behufe einer besseren Rechtspflege. Berlin 1780.
- Hand-Buch in katechetischer Form für Lehrer die aufklären wollen und dürfen. Waisenhaus, Halle 1783.
- Catechismus der gesunden Vernunft. Oder Versuch, in faßlichen Erklärungen wichtiger Wörter, nach ihren gemeinnützigsten Bedeutungen, und mit einigen Beyspielen begleitet. Nicolai, Berlin 1786.
- Versuch über Armen-Anstalten und Abschaffung aller Betteley. Berlin 1789.
- Honoré-Gabriel de Riquetti Mirabeau, Friedrich Eberhard von Rochow (Übersetzer) Herrn Mirabeau des ältern Discurs über die Nationalerziehung. Nach seinem Tode gedruckt und übersetzt, auch mit einigen Noten und einem Vorbericht begleitet. Nicolai, Berlin und Stettin 1792.
- Berichtigungen. Erster Versuch. Schulbuchhandlung, Braunschweig 1792.
- Berichtigungen. Zweiter Versuch. Braunschweig 1794.
- Geschichte meiner Schulen. Röhß, Schleswig 1795.
- Summarium oder Menschen-Katechismus. Röhß, Schleswig 1796.
- Zusätze zu dem Summarium oder Menschen-Katechismus. Röhß, Schleswig 1796.
- Materialien zum Frühunterricht in Bürger und Industrieschulen. Berlin / Stettin 1797.
- Litterarische Correspondenz mit verstorbenen Gelehrten. Nicolai, Berlin / Stettin 1798. Title
- Friedrich Eberhard von Rochows sämtliche pädagogische Schriften. 4 Bände. G. Reimer, Berlin 1907–1910.

== Bibliography (in German) ==
- Adolf Friedrich August von Rochow: Nachrichten zur Geschichte des Geschlechts derer von Rochow und ihrer Besitzungen. Ernst und Korn, Berlin 1861, S. 148–153. (diglib.hab.de)
- Binder: 'Rochow, Friedrich Eberhard' v. In: Allgemeine Deutsche Biographie (ADB). Vol. 28, Duncker & Humblot, Leipzig 1889, p. 727–734.
- Karl Goedeke, Edmund Goetze: Grundriss zur Geschichte der deutschen Dichtung aus den Quellen. 3. Auflage. Ehlermann, Leipzig 1916, Vol. 4, Abtlg. 1. p. 511 f.
- Rainer Lachmann (1994). "Friedrich Eberhard von Rochow". In Bautz, Traugott (ed.). Biographisch-Bibliographisches Kirchenlexikon (BBKL) (in German). Vol. 8. Herzberg: Bautz. cols. 461–466. ISBN 3-88309-053-0.
- Hanno Schmitt (ed.): Vernunft fürs Volk. Friedrich Eberhard von Rochow 1734–1805 im Aufbruch Preußens. Henschel, Berlin 2001. ISBN 3-89487-394-9.
- Annegret Völpel (2003). "Rochow, Friedrich Eberhard Freiherr von". Neue Deutsche Biographie (in German). Vol. 21. Berlin: Duncker & Humblot. pp. 683–684. (full text online).
- H.-P. Michael Freyer: Einflüsse der Erfahrungs-Seelenlehre auf die Erziehungstheorie des Freiherrn Friedrich Eberhard von Rochow (1734–1805). in: Würzburger medizinhistorische Mitteilungen. 24, Würzburg 2005, S. 341–347. ISSN 0177-5227
- Silke Siebrecht: Der Halberstädter Domherr Friedrich Eberhard von Rochow. Handlungsräume und Wechselbeziehungen eines Philanthropen und Volksaufklärers in der zweiten Hälfte des 18. Jahrhunderts. 334 S., zahlr. Abb., edition lumière, Bremen 2013. ISBN 978-3-943245-05-9. (Teildigitalisat, PDF).
- Johanna Goldbeck: Volksaufklärerische Schulreform auf dem Lande in ihren Verflechtungen. Das Besucherverzeichnis der Reckahner Musterschule Friedrich Eberhard von Rochows als Schlüsselquelle für europaweite Netzwerke im Zeitalter der Aufklärung. Bremen 2014. ISBN 978-3-943245-19-6.
