= Caesar's Commentaries =

Caesar's Commentaries may refer to one of two works written by Julius Caesar:

- Commentarii de Bello Gallico, concerning Caesar's campaigns in Gaul and Britain, 58–50 BC
- Commentarii de Bello Civili, concerning his participation in the Roman Civil War of 49–48 BC
