= List of Australian television series premieres in 2011 =

This is a list of Australian television programs which first aired in 2011. The list is arranged chronological order. Where more than one program debuted on the same date, those programs are listed alphabetically.

== Premieres ==
=== Free-to-air television ===
Program	Network	Debut date	Reference/s
Couch Time	Eleven	11 January	
6.30 with George Negus	Network Ten	24 January	
Wurrawhy	Network Ten	31 January	
Ben Elton: Live from Planet Earth	Nine Network	8 February	
Adam Hills In Gordon Street Tonight	ABC1	9 February	
Laid	ABC1	9 February	
Zumbo	SBS One	10 February	
Send in the Dogs Australia	Nine Network	13 February	
Conviction Kitchen	Seven Network	22 February	
The Game Plan NRL	One HD	10 March	
The Million Dollar Drop	Nine Network	21 March	
Winners & Losers	Seven Network	22 March	
The Game Plan AFL	One HD	23 March	
The Final Siren	One HD	27 March	
AFP: Australian Federal Police	Nine Network	26 April	
Bananas in Pyjamas (2011)	ABC2	2 May	
BIG - Extreme Makeover	Nine Network	4 May	
In Their Footsteps	Nine Network	8 May	
Angry Boys	ABC1	11 May	
Between the Lines	Nine Network	12 May	
The Amazing Race Australia	Seven Network	16 May	
Outback Kids	ABC1	19 May	
Lawrence Leung's Unbelievable	ABC1	15 June	
Can of Worms	Network Ten	4 July	
Crownies	ABC1	14 July	
Top Design Australia	Nine Network	13 July	
Behind the Front Door	SBS One	22 July	
The Renovators	Network Ten	24 July	
Judith Lucy's Spiritual Journey	ABC1	27 July	
Hamish and Andy's Gap Year	Nine Network	28 July	
The Unnatural History of Sex	SBS One	29 July	
Wild Boys	Seven Network	4 September	
Twentysomething	ABC2	6 September	
The Joy of Sets	Nine Network	20 September	
The Slap	ABC1	6 October	
Recruits: Paramedics	Network Ten	6 October	
The Celebrity Apprentice Australia	Nine Network	24 October	
Housos	SBS One	24 October	
Young Doctors	Nine Network	26 October	
Mal.com	ABC3	28 October	
Australia's Got Amazing Talent!	Seven Network	1 November	
My Sri Lanka with Peter Kuruvita	SBS One	3 November	
Who's Been Sleeping in My House?	ABC1	21 November	
The Family	SBS One	24 November	

=== Subscription television ===
Program	Network	Debut date	Reference/s
Aussie Strike Force	Nat Geo Wild	11 January	
The Stafford Brothers	Fox8	21 January	
You Have Been Watching	The Comedy Channel	17 February	
Park Street	Arena	23 February	
Dannii Minogue: Style Queen	Fox8	23 February	
Richo	Sky News Australia	23 February	
Donna Hay: Fast, Fresh, Simple	The LifeStyle Channel	15 March	
Trinny & Susannah’s Australian Makeover Mission	LifeStyle You	4 April	
Kalgoorlie Cops	Crime & Investigation Network	14 April	
Balls of Steel Australia	The Comedy Channel	19 April	
Small Time Gangster	Movie Extra	19 April	
Tony Robinson Explores Australia	The History Channel	3 May	
Breaking	MTV Australia	11 August	
Slide	Fox8	16 August	
Eat Yourself Sexy Australia	LifeStyle You	25 August	
Rove LA	Fox8	19 September	
WTF!	Channel [V]	21 September	
Relocation Relocation Australia	The LifeStyle Channel	28 September	
Outback Wrangler	Nat Geo Wild	4 October	
Planet Cake	LifeStyle Food	2 November	
Killing Time	TV1	2 November	
