= 2011 in Australian television =

This is a list of Australian television events and premieres which occurred in 2011. This year will be the 56th year of continuous operation of television in Australia.

== Events ==
- 11 January – Ten Network Holdings and CBS Studios International launch digital multi-channel Eleven, which replaces the standard definition simulcast of One HD. Network Ten also permanently shifts its long-running soap opera Neighbours to the new channel after having aired the series for 24 years. The first episode on Eleven was its highest-rated program of the night, recording 254,000 metropolitan viewers.
- 13 January – The Australian Government lifts restrictions on the anti-siphoning rule to allow the Seven Network to air parts of the Australian Open on its digital multichannel 7Two while Seven News airs on the primary channel. This practice has continued in subsequent years.
- 16 January – Prime Television and GWN Television rebrand as Prime7 and GWN7 respectively, reaffirming their alignment with the Seven Network. The "Prime" on-screen watermark is also removed for Seven Network digital multichannels 7Two and 7mate.
- 24 January – The launch of 6PM with George Negus and Ten Evening News marks Network Ten's return to the regular broadcasting of news and current affairs programs in the 6:00–7:00 pm timeslot for the first time in 20 years. The new line-up is in direct competition with news and current affairs offerings on both the Seven and Nine networks.
- 4 April – Seven picks up the rights to televise Wimbledon, and in doing so, promises viewers live coverage of most matches including the men's and women's singles semi-finals, and championship matches.
- 27 April – Two days before it was due to air, ABC Television is forced to cancel their planned coverage of the Wedding of Prince William of Wales and Kate Middleton, which was to be a "satirical commentary" by The Chaser, due to restrictions imposed by Clarence House. Set to air on ABC2, The Chaser’s Royal Wedding Commentary, was instead replaced by a simulcast of BBC's coverage and commentary of the wedding.
- 28 April – The Australian Football League (AFL) television broadcast rights for the 2012 to 2016 seasons is awarded to the Seven Network and Foxtel in a record $1.253 billion deal (including mobile and internet coverage awarded to Telstra). The Seven Network will broadcast four games each round, three of them live, as well as all finals live. For the first time, Foxtel will broadcast all nine matches each round, as well as all finals except the Grand Final, live, simulcasting the Seven Network's coverage of its four games. Foxtel will also relaunch a dedicated AFL channel after its previous attempt, the Fox Footy Channel, ceased broadcasting in 2006.
- 2 May – Emma Duncan wins the sixth season of The Biggest Loser.
- 8 May – Network Ten shifts the focus of its high-definition digital multichannel One from purely sports coverage and programming, to a mix of general entertainment and sports, specifically targeting audiences in the male 24-to-54-year-old demographic.
- 26 June – Heather Foord presents her final Nine News Queensland bulletin before retiring from television permanently; she is replaced the following weekend by Eva Milic.
- 10 July – TV chef Manu Feildel, alongside professional dance partner Alana Patience, win the eleventh season of Dancing with the Stars.
- 28 July – 7TWO, 7mate, GEM, GO!, ONE & ELEVEN expand to Western Australia.
- 1 August – Surfers and best friends Tyler Atkins and Nathan Jolliffe win the first season of The Amazing Race Australia.
- 2 August – Jack Vidgen wins the fifth season of Australia's Got Talent.
- 7 August – Kate Bracks wins the third season of MasterChef Australia.
- 20 and 21 August – The Nine Network's most-watched Queensland news bulletin conducts two crosses to journalists in a helicopter claiming to be "near Beerwah, Queensland", where the remains of murdered schoolboy Daniel Morcombe had been found earlier that month. However, the crosses are revealed to be fake when, on the second night, rival station Channel Seven filmed footage of the Nine helicopter sitting on the helipad outside their studios at Mount Coot-tha at the time of the broadcast. Radar footage also revealed that, on the first night, the helicopter was actually hovering over Chapel Hill, 70 km away from Beerwah. Two journalists, Melissa Mallet and Cameron Price, as well as news producer Aaron Wakeley, are all sacked by the Nine Network following the incident, while Lee Anderson resigned in protest over the sackings.
- 21 August – Polly Porter and Warwick "Waz" Jones win the fourth season of The Block.
- 7 September – Robert Davidov wins the first series of Top Design Australia.
- 9 September – Nine Network confirmed that they were bringing back Big Brother Australia in 2012.
- 9 September – The eleventh season of the popular British children's television series Thomas & Friends finally airs on ABC2 at 1:05pm starting with Hide and Peep.
- 12 September – Dylan Cooper wins the third season of Project Runway Australia.
- 30 September – Ten Late News and Sports Tonight withdrawn their Broadcasts for the very last time.
- 12 October – Michael Lynch wins the first series of The Renovators.
- 22 October – Nine News Sydney overtakes Seven News Sydney as the news ratings leader in Sydney for the first time since 2004.
- 25 October Montana Cox wins the seventh season of Australia's Next Top Model.
- 11 November – 7TWO, 7mate, GEM, GO!, ONE & ELEVEN expand to South Eastern South Australia.
- 21 November – Comedian Julia Morris wins the first season of The Celebrity Apprentice Australia.
- 22 November – Reece Mastin wins the third series of The X Factor.
- 23 November – Greta Yaxley wins the second season of Junior MasterChef Australia.
- 24 November – Sarah Lawther and Lachlan Cosgrove win the third season of Beauty and the Geek Australia.
- 27 November – The Seven Network wins its 40th (out of a possible 40) week of ratings for the 2011 calendar year, and becomes the first Australian television network to achieve a clean sweep of a ratings calendar year.

=== Celebrity deaths ===
- 4 January – Geoff Raymond (aged 89), news presenter.
- 21 May – Bill Hunter (aged 71), actor
- 11 June, James Elliot (aged 82) Scottish-born Australian actor, best known as Alf Sutcliffe Number 96

=== Channels ===
New channels

- 11 January – Eleven
- 29 May – Disney Junior
- 28 July - 7TWO, GO!, GEM, ONE, ELEVEN & 7mate (Albany/Bunbury)
- 11 November - February 2012 - 7TWO, GO!, GEM, ONE, ELEVEN & 7mate (Mount Gambier/Riverland)

Renamed channels

- 16 January – Prime7 (replacing Prime)
- 16 January – GWN7 (replacing GWN)
- 1 May – ABC4 Kids (replacing ABC For Kids on 2, but shared with ABC2)
- 8 May – One (replacing One HD)

== Premieres ==
=== Telemovies ===
Domestic telemovie premieres on Australian television in 2012
Telemovie	Original airdate(s)	Network	Ref
Underbelly Files: Tell Them Lucifer was Here	7 February	Nine Network	
Underbelly Files: Infiltration	14 February	Nine Network	
Underbelly Files: The Man Who Got Away	21 February	Nine Network	
Blood Brothers	8 May	Nine Network	

=== Miniseries ===
Domestic

Program	Channel	Debut date	Reference/s
Cloudstreet	Showcase	22 May	

International

Program	Channel	Debut date	Reference/s
(United Kingdom) Collision	ABC1	7 January	
(United Kingdom) Murderland	ABC1	28 January	
(United States) The Kennedys	ABC1	22 May	

=== Documentaries ===
Domestic

Program	Channel	Debut date	Reference/s
Living the End	SBS One	25 January	
The Irish in Australia	The History Channel	17 March	
The Secret History of Eurovision	SBS One	6 and 13 May	

International

Program	Channel	Debut date	Reference/s
(United States) Despicable Me TV Show	Seven Network	19 February	
(United Kingdom) Madagascar	Nine Network	4 May	
(United Kingdom) Polar Bear: Spy on the Ice	Nine Network	9 and 16 June	
(United Kingdom) The Shadow of the Moon	SBS One	TBA	
(United States) Teenage Paparazzo	ABC2	23 October	

== Programming changes ==
=== Changes to network affiliation ===
This is a list of programs which made their premiere on an Australian television network that had previously premiered on another Australian television network. The networks involved in the switch of allegiances are predominantly both free-to-air networks or both subscription television networks. Programs that have their free-to-air/subscription television premiere, after previously premiering on the opposite platform (free-to air to subscription/subscription to free-to air) are not included. In some cases, programs may still air on the original television network. This occurs predominantly with programs shared between subscription television networks.

==== Domestic ====
Program	New network	Previous network	Date
Neighbours	Eleven	Network Ten	11 January
Animation Fixation	Eleven	Network Ten	12 January
The Chaser's War on Everything	7mate	ABC1	28 August

==== International ====
Program	New network	Previous network	Date
(United States) Diagnosis: Murder	Eleven	Nine Network	11 January
(United States) JAG	Eleven	Network Ten	11 January
(United States) MacGyver	Eleven	Network Ten	11 January
(United States) Cheers	Eleven	Nine Network	11 January
(United States) Roseanne	Eleven	Seven Network	11 January
(United States) Sabrina, the Teenage Witch	Eleven	Network Ten	11 January
(United States) Happy Days	Eleven	Nine Network	11 January
(United States) Mork and Mindy	Eleven	Nine Network	11 January
(United States) The Brady Bunch	Eleven	Nine Network	11 January
(United States) Family Ties	Eleven	Nine Network	11 January
(United States) Everybody Loves Raymond	Eleven	Network Ten	11 January
(United States) The Simpsons	Eleven	Network Ten	11 January
(United States) Futurama	Eleven	Network Ten	11 January
(United States) The Office	Eleven	Network Ten	11 January
(United States) Nurse Jackie	Eleven	Network Ten	11 January
(United States) Californication	Eleven	Network Ten	11 January
(United States) The Love Boat	Eleven	Nine Network	12 January
(United States) Touched by an Angel	Eleven	Nine Network	12 January
(United States) 7th Heaven	Eleven	Network Ten	12 January
(United States) The Cleveland Show	Eleven	Network Ten	12 January
(United States) King of the Hill	Eleven	Seven Network	12 January
(United States) Stargate Universe	Eleven	Network Ten	13 January
(United States) 90210	Eleven	Network Ten	14 January
(United States) So You Think You Can Dance	Eleven	Network Ten	14 January
(United States) Get Smart Axed after 3 episodes	Eleven	GO!	15 January
(United States) Hogan's Heroes Axed after 2 episodes	Eleven	GO!	15 January
(United States) Smallville	Eleven	Network Ten	16 January
(United States) Angel	Eleven	Network Ten	16 January
(United States) Supernatural	Eleven	Network Ten	17 January
(United States) Dexter	Eleven	Network Ten	17 January
(United States) Star Trek: The Next Generation	Eleven	GO!	20 January
(United States) The Golden Girls	GEM	Seven Network	3 February
(United States) MegaStructures	7mate	Ten HD (now defunct)	3 February
(United States) Malcolm in the Middle	Eleven	Network Ten	4 February
(United States) Sex and the City	Eleven	Network Ten	4 February
(United States) Frasier	Eleven	GO!	5 February
(United States) The Nanny	GO! (second run)	GEM	28 March
(United States) Spin City	GO!	Nine Network	2 May
(France) / (Australia) Sally Bollywood	ABC3	Seven Network	2 May
(United States) 24	One	Seven Network	11 July
(United States) The King of Queens	Eleven	GO!	17 July
(United States) Buffy the Vampire Slayer	Eleven	Network Ten	13 August
(United Kingdom) / (Republic of Ireland) I'm a Celebrity...Get Me Out of Here!	GO!	Nine Network	23 November
(United States) Mad About You	7Two	Network Ten	28 November
(United States) Who's The Boss?	7Two	Nine Network	28 November
(United States) Step By Step	7Two	Nine Network	4 December
(United States) Get Smart	One	Eleven	19 December
(United States) Hogan's Heroes	One	Eleven	19 December
(United States) M*A*S*H	One	Seven Network	19 December

=== Free-to-air premieres ===
This is a list of programs which made their premiere on Australian free-to-air television that had previously premiered on Australian subscription television. Programs may still air on the original subscription television network.

Program	Free-to-air network	Subscription network	Date	Reference/s
(United Kingdom) The Gadget Show	Network Ten	LifeStyle	15 January	
(United States) Jersey Shore	7mate	MTV	11 May	
(United States) Sons of Anarchy	One	Showcase	11 May	
(United States) The Penguins of Madagascar	Network Ten	Nickelodeon	13 May	
(United States) Power Rangers Samurai	GO!	Nickelodeon	17 July	
(United States) Teen Mom	GO!	MTV	2 October	
(United States) Jeopardy!	One	W	24 October	
(United Kingdom) Britain's Next Top Model	Eleven	Fox8	31 October	
(Japan) Beyblade: Medal Masters	Network Ten	Cartoon Network	8 November	
(United States) The Glades	Network Ten	W	28 November	
(Japan) Bakugan: Mechtanium Surge	Network Ten	Cartoon Network	14 December	

=== Subscription premieres ===
This is a list of programs which made their premiere on Australian subscription television that had previously premiered on Australian free-to-air television. Programs may still air on the original free-to-air television network.

Program	Subscription network	Free-to-air network	Date	Reference/s
(United States) The Cleveland Show	Fox8	Network Ten / Eleven	13 March	
(Japan) Pokémon: Diamond and Pearl: Sinnoh League Victors	Cartoon Network	Network Ten	10 September	
(United Kingdom) In the Night Garden...	CBeebies	ABC4 Kids	November	
(United Kingdom) Merlin	UKTV	Network Ten	26 December	
(United States) The Super Mario Bros. Super Show!	KidsCo	Nine Network / ABC Kids Channel (now defunct)	December	

=== Ended this year ===
Program	End date	Network	Debut date	Reference/s
Puzzle Play	28 January	Network Ten	21 December 2006	
Ben Elton Live From Planet Earth	22 February	Nine Network	8 February 2011	
The 7.30 Report	4 March	ABC1	28 January 1986	
Stateline	4 March	ABC1	16 February 1996	
City Homicide	30 March	Seven Network	27 August 2007	
Conviction Kitchen	12 April	Seven Network	22 February 2011	
The New Adventures of Winnie The Pooh	29 May	Playhouse Disney	20 January 1990 (On Seven Network)	
East West 101	1 June	SBS One	6 December 2007	
Between the Lines	2 June (Note: Originally, the fourth episode of Between the Lines was due to be the final episode broadcast on 2 June 2011; the Nine Network then decided to air the sole remaining episode produced the following week on 9 June 2011, however, they reversed this decision screening the first part of Polar Bear: Spy on the Ice. The final episode is therefore yet to air.)	Nine Network	12 May 2011	
In Their Footsteps	10 July	Nine Network	8 May 2011	
Angry Boys	27 July	ABC1	11 May 2011	
Video Hits	6 August	Network Ten	15 February 1987	
Rescue: Special Ops	5 September	Nine Network	2 August 2009	
Top Design Australia	7 September	Nine Network	13 July 2011	
Top Gear Australia	13 September	Nine Network	29 September 2008 (on SBS)	
Collectors	23 September	ABC1	24 March 2005	
Sports Tonight	30 September	Network Ten / One	30 August 1993	
Ten Late News	30 September	Network Ten	21 January 1991	
Spit It Out	3 October	Seven Network	4 October 2010	
6.30 with George Negus (previously 6pm With George Negus)	28 October	Network Ten	24 January 2011	
Wild Boys	20 November	Seven Network	4 September 2011	
Spicks and Specks	23 November	ABC1	9 February 2005	
Kerri-Anne (previously Mornings With Kerri-Anne)	25 November	Nine Network	28 October 2002	
RPM	16 November	One	22 March (second run)	
Hi-5	16 December	Nine Network	12 April 1999	

=== Returning this year ===
Program	New Network	Previous network	Debut date	End date	Return date	Reference/s
Good Chef Bad Chef	Network Ten	Seven Network	2006	2007	3 January	
This Is Your Life	Same	Nine Network	1995	2008	28 February	
RPM	One	Network Ten	1997	2008	22 March	
It's a Knockout	Same	Network Ten	April 1985	September 1987	27 November	

== See also ==
- 2011 in Australia
- List of Australian films of 2011
