= Beach Cops =

- Promotional title card of Beach Cops.
- Narrated by: Layne Beachley
- Country of origin: Australia
- No. of series: 3
- No. of episodes: 18

Production
- Executive producer: Lyndal Marks
- Production locations: Northern Beaches, Sydney, Australia
- Running time: 30 minutes (inc. adverts)
- Production company: Seven Productions

Original release
- Network: Seven Network
- Release: 11 October 2015 – 24 October 2018

Beach Cops is an Australian factual television series produced by and screened on the Seven Network. The series is filmed on the Northern Beaches of Sydney and follows the New South Wales Police Force operating in the local area while performing their duties.

The program is narrated by Layne Beachley. Northern Beaches local area commander Superintendent Dave Darcy had veto power over content in the series. This series follows on from other observational documentary series featuring police on the Seven Network such as The Force: Behind The Line and Highway Patrol.

== Broadcast ==
The six episode first season premiered in Australia on the Seven Network on 11 October 2015. A second season debuted on 19 October 2016. A third season began on 9 August 2018.

== Episodes ==
Series	Episodes	Originally released	
Series	Episodes	First released	Last released
1	6	11 October 2015	22 November 2015
2	6	19 October 2016	9 November 2016
3	6	9 August 2018	24 October 2018

=== Season 1 (2015) ===
No. overall	No. in series	Title	Original release date	Australian viewers
1	1	Episode One	11 October 2015	1,002,000
Follow police officers patrolling Sydney beaches from Palm Beach to Manly Beach, responding to a variety of dangerous, horrific and sometimes hilarious situations as part of their duties during the summer months. In this episode, officers look for a suspect who is accused of using a garden as a toilet and traffic enforcement officers are involved in a head-on collision.
2	2	Episode Two	18 October 2015^{[Note A]}	730,000
A man attempts to deny he is stealing pot plants from front yards, a dangerous fire at a factory has police assisting firefighters, police catch a man driving who was disqualified by a magistrate just moments earlier and officers from the beach and the air search for a man feared drowning off a beach in the middle of the night.
3	3	Episode Three	25 October 2015	776,000
A man high on ice threatens to burn down a neighbouring apartment, police investigate a series of racist signs placed throughout a local suburb, cops smell marijuana near Manly Beach, and officer's cars become involved in a bingle.
4	4	Episode Four	1 November 2015	716,000
Nicole and Brendan remove a drunk man hurling abuse at passers by in a public park, officers respond to the scene of a motorcycle crash, police attempt to find a woman who might be in an unfit mental state and a wild storm causes a busy work day for the beach cops.
5	5	Episode Five	8 November 2015	815,000
Officers respond to a house losing its foundations and threatening to collapse on a road, Brendan must deliver his first death notice and a man unleashes his frustration on a poker machine.
6	6	Driver vs Passenger	22 November 2015^{[Note B]}	753,000
An intoxicated man refuses to cooperate with police trying to help him home and officers charge a woman using an iPad while driving.

=== Season 2 (2016) ===
No.	Title	Original release date	Australian viewers
1	Episode One	19 October 2016	684,000
Police respond to a teenager who has become stuck in a blowhole, an intoxicated man thrown out of a bar argues with officers about the law, homemade bombs are found strapped to poles in a carpark, two officers deliver a death notice and a driver pulled over for road rage is found to be unlicensed.
2	Episode Two:	26 October 2016	661,000
A man is cautioned for urinating in public while a second man is fined for public nudity on the beach, police investigate an animal cruelty case involving a deceased cat, officers respond to a fisherman who has fallen off rocks, a drunk driver crashes his ute into a creek leaving a passenger trapped in the vehicle, and a vehicle pulled over for a faulty brake light leads officers to find illegal drugs.
3	Episode Three	26 October 2016	557,000
Officers break up a series of fights within 30 minutes on the Corso, garbagemen find 2 grenades in rubbish they've collected, cops search bushland in the dark for an injured teenager, officers investigate related car thefts, reports of a man wheeling unboxed televisions in a shopping trolley gets police attention, and an 80-year-old woman reports a robbery.
4	Episode Four	2 November 2016	731,000
Police caution several people urinating in public, Nicole stops a car with four men acting suspiciously on Pittwater Road, officers receive a report of a man taking photos of kids playing cricket, Nicole and Teri track down a man accused of theft of a television from a store, an aggressive drunk driver is charged after colliding with a learner driver, and a tip leads police to stolen trailers.
5	Episode Five	2 November 2016	700,000
Officers deal with the aftermath of two intoxicated men brawling outside a pie shop, Nicole and Brendan help pursue the area's most wanted thief, Gibbo and Sam respond to an elderly woman who suspects squatters has robbed her home, an anonymous bomb threat is made to a local primary school, a motorcyclist caught dropping his phone at traffic lights is fined A$320, and the search is on for a swimmer in dangerous swells at North Narrabeen.
6	Episode Six	9 November 2016	668,000
An aggressive man affected by drugs is capsicum sprayed and arrested, a serial fraudster and shoplifter is tracked down, two men are caught fighting right outside a police station, Teri and Nicole deal with a neighbourhood dispute involving faeces put in someone's letterbox, officers breath test a learner driver and his supervisor, and a driver hits a wallaby in the dark.

=== Season 3 (2018) ===
No.	Title	Original release date	Australian viewers
1	Wild Party	9 August 2018	361,000
Officers deal with an intoxicated driver who has crashed his car, an angry motorist, complaints about a party which has grown out of control, and a dangerous discovery in a backyard shed.
2	Meat Thief	16 August 2018	255,000^{[Note C]}
CCTV helps the cops catch a meat thief. Driving without a licence is not a good idea. A very drunk driver has trouble blowing into the bag. Two drunk men decide to fight with police.
3	Trapped in a Toilet	23 August 2018	373,000^{[Note D]}
Police chase a man in a ute who flees a traffic stop. Firies need to help two young people trapped in a public toilet. A man kidnaps his ex-girlfriend's dog. Cops help a very drunk tourist get home.
4	Pop up Party	6 September 2018	223,000^{[Note C]}
Cops chase some young men in the backstreets of Manly after a fight. Cyclists keep going through red lights right in front of the cops. An Australia Day pop-up party gets out of control.
5	Indecent Exposure	17 October 2018	544,000
A dog has been left in a car in the hot sun. Police arrest a man who has exposed himself in a car park. Horses have escaped from a paddock and the cops need to get them off the road.
6	Pub Brawl	24 October 2018	629,000
A man on a bicycle is busted with weed. A young man's hotted-up car doesn't comply with the road rules. A man has been stabbed in a fight at the pub. Drunken hoons have to be removed from a park.

=== Notes ===
- ^{Note A} This episode did not air in Western Australia due to staggered network schedule in that state, and aired at a later date.
- ^{Note B} This episode was originally scheduled to air on 15 November 2015, however was pulled from the schedule for special news coverage of the November 2015 Paris attacks.
- ^{Note C} This episode did not air in Victoria or South Australia due to staggered network schedule in those states, and aired at a later date.
- ^{Note D} This episode did not air in South Australia due to staggered network schedule in that state, and aired at a later date.

== See also ==
- Gold Coast Cops
- Territory Cops
- Kalgoorlie Cops
