= Gold Coast Cops =

- Genre: Factual television
- Narrated by: Samuel Johnson
- Country of origin: Australia
- Original language: English
- No. of seasons: 2
- No. of episodes: 20

Production
- Executive producer: Claire Haywood
- Production locations: Gold Coast, Queensland
- Editors: Marcos Moro, Bob Burns, Tom Norton
- Running time: 30 minutes (inc. adverts)
- Production company: Eyeworks Australia

Original release
- Network: Network Ten
- Release: 29 September 2014 – 16 August 2015

Related
- Kalgoorlie Cops; Territory Cops

Gold Coast Cops is an Australian factual television series on Network Ten. It follows the work of Queensland Police Service officers from the newly created Rapid Action & Patrols Group (RAP) on the Gold Coast in Queensland. The series was renewed for a second season in November 2014, returning 17 March 2015. The second season experienced a 3-month mid-season hiatus due to the seventh season of MasterChef Australia, however, returned on 2 August 2015 in the new timeslot of 7pm Sundays.

In September 2015 media reports emerged that Senior Constable Aaron Minns, who appeared in the program, was suspended from his position and charged with four counts of allegedly assaulting restrained prisoners. On Wednesday 4 May 2016, Minns was found not guilty on all charges, after a trial in the Brisbane Magistrates Court.

In November 2015, it was announced the series would not return.

== Episodes ==
=== Series overview ===
Series	Episodes	Originally released	
Series	Episodes	First released	Last released
1	10	29 September 2014	24 November 2014
2	10	17 March 2015	16 August 2015

=== Season 1 (2014) ===
No. overall	No. in series	Title	Original release date	Overnight AUS viewers
1	1	"Pilot"	29 September 2014	563,000
Don't miss the exhilarating, action-packed season premiere of Gold Coast Cops. The team of elite, hand-picked officers discover home-made explosives hidden in the car of a Hell's Angels member.
2	2	"Episode 2"	6 October 2014	698,000
Sergeant St Claire leads a drug operation into the Gold Coast hinterland and RAP officers go on the hunt to put a Black Uhlan motorcycle gang member back behind bars after breaching bail conditions.
3	3	"Episode 3"	13 October 2014	618,000
Senior Constable Kristee La Rocca and her partner Constable Nick Irby hunt down a man charged with assault who failed to show up for court. The team also chase a man on the run through the suburbs.
4	4	"Episode 4"	20 October 2014	684,000
Police target the Southside Soldiers, a 'feeder' group into the criminal motorcycle gangs. With the help of the AFP dog-squad, tens of thousands of dollars' worth of gold and cash are found stored in hidden safes.
5	5	"Episode 5"	27 October 2014	647,000
While carrying out a search warrant on three suspected burglars, not only are masks of the kind used for break-ins revealed, but also ice, drug paraphernalia and the mysterious getaway car.
6	6	"Episode 6"	3 November 2014	522,000
Senior Sgt Stewart conducts a briefing, outlining a number of outstanding return-to-prison warrants. The team then run a covert operation to apprehend one of the offenders, who's known to be violent.
7	7	"Episode 7"	10 November 2014	517,000
Two constables pull over a car weaving all over the road with an unmistakable acrid smell of cannabis, a search soon reveals that the driver has a small drug business stashed down his pants.
8	8	"Episode 8"	17 November 2014	491,000
Senior Constable Hardy and Constable Mamaril stake out a caravan park waiting for a drug deal to go down. Meanwhile, Senior Constable Carruthers is on the hunt for a stolen car.
9	9	"Episode 9"	24 November 2014	737,000
Constables Beaman and Moren pull over a vehicle and find the ingredients used to make 'ice' in the man's boot.
10	10	"Episode 10"	24 November 2014	772,000
Constable Liasedes is called out to deal with a report of graffiti vandalism.

=== Season 2 (2015) ===
No. overall	No. in series	Title	Original release date	Overnight AUS viewers
11	1	"Episode 1"	17 March 2015	419,000
The Gold Coast's police taskforce have their work cut out for them after discovering one of the biggest drug hauls in RAP history.
12	2	"Episode 2"	24 March 2015	410,000
A P-plate driver unwittingly gets in the way of an urgent Code 2 call out to a violent scene. Meanwhile, Senior Constable Kate Hardy encounters a suspicious couple parked in a deserted car park.
13	3	"Episode 3"	31 March 2015	577,000
A routine traffic stop reveals a driver mid-eating in his car, but it's the search of her boot that unveils some eye opening finds.
14	4	"Episode 4"	7 April 2015	439,000
Constable O'Connor and Sergeant Casey are undercover conducting surveillance on a male they believe is running a major drug syndicate on the Gold Coast.
15	5	"Episode 5"	14 April 2015	423,000
Senior Constable Matt Bloomfield and Constable Joshua Ford are called to a violent street punch on, whilst both men are virtually incoherent, one is also dripping blood from an earlier incident.
16	6	"Episode 6"	21 April 2015	N/A
Sergeant Blair Casey and Senior Constable Katy Hardy spot a hatchback that looks like it's carrying more than it can handle. They pull the car over despite protests from the driver, but nothing can prepare them for what happens next.
17	7	"Episode 7"	28 April 2015	425,000
While the Gold Coast is renowned for its tourist attractions, a Lone Wolf bikie passed out on the drug 'fantasy' is a tourist attraction Cavill Ave could do without.
18	8	"Episode 8"	2 August 2015	550,000
Working from a tip off from an informant, Sergeant Blair Casey and the team execute an emergency raid on a drug dealer.
19	9	"Episode 9"	9 August 2015	474,000
Senior Constable Bloomfield and Sgt St Clair are executing a search warrant on a man they believe is operating a major stolen car racket.
20	10	"Episode 10"	16 August 2015	501,000
Constable Mamaril is part of a team raiding the home of a suspected Bandidos bikie associate. Police intelligence suggests that the home contains a meth lab.

== See also ==
- Beach Cops
- Kalgoorlie Cops
- Territory Cops
- The Force: Behind the Line
- Highway Patrol (Australian TV series)
- Border Security: Australia's Front Line
- AFP
