= Kalgoorlie Cops =

Kalgoorlie Cops is an Australian factual television show that looks at the work of the police in Kalgoorlie, Western Australia. This observational documentary series began on the Crime and Investigation Network in 2011.

== Episodes ==
=== Season 1 (2011) ===
No. overall	No. in season	Title	Original release date	Viewers (millions)
1	1	"Bloody Joust"	14 April 2011	N/A
Alecia Huxley and Mitch Derrick go on the weekend night patrol they call a joust. They move on a few disorderly blokes and race to the aid of bouncers at a nightclub when a bloody fight breaks out on the dancefloor.
2	2	"Restrained"	21 April 2011	N/A
Sergeant Cameron Clifford goes out on night patrol and answers an emergency call about a domestic in the suburbs. The suspect, who has a restraining order against him, has jumped in a car with his wife and is armed with a knife. While he is tracking the suspect down he comes across a car that appears to be hooning around but it turns out to be an elderly woman. He tracks down the violent domestic suspect and makes an arrest.
3	3	"Bikie Raid"	28 April 2011	N/A
Constables Tony Fletcher and Taleah Moult join Kal’s serious crime squad, the Desert Demons, as they raid the clubhouse of the Gypsy Jokers outlaw motorcycle gang.
4	4	"Kalgoorlie Cup"	5 May 2011	N/A
Race week in Kal revs up with the Kalgoorlie Cup, which attracts thousands more punters to town. Police backup is brought in to deal with disorderly behaviour and Constables Alecia Huxley, Mitch Derrick and Toney Fletcher have their work cut out for them keeping the peace at the track and in town.
5	5	"A Constable and a Gentleman"	12 May 2011	N/A
Constable Rob Malcolm pulls over a couple of P-Platers who have been out partying and broken the curfew – and books a bloke for illegal modifications to his car – but in the nicest way possible.
6	6	"Runaway"	19 May 2011	N/A
Constable Alecia Huxley’s heart goes out to a young girl who has gone missing from her home. She tracks the girl down and looks after her while she finds a place for her to stay.
7	7	"Drug Raid"	26 May 2011	N/A
Richard de Cloux and Jeff Tan lead the Desert Demons in two drug raids. They seize drugs from the first house and some deadly weapons from the second, including a homemade ball and chain.
8	8	"No Burnouts"	2 June 2011	N/A
Constables Tegan Mills and Rob Malcolm investigate allegations of hooning in a suburban street. They attempt to impound a car but the hoons argue the case.

== See also ==
- Territory Cops
- Gold Coast Cops
- Beach Cops
- The Force: Behind the Line
- Border Security: Australia's Front Line
- AFP
- Highway Patrol (Australian TV series)
