= Conviction Kitchen =

- Genre: Reality
- Starring: Marc Thuet; Biana Zorich
- Narrated by: Marc Thuet; Biana Zorich
- Country of origin: Canada
- Original language: English
- No. of seasons: 2
- No. of episodes: 16

Production
- Executive producer: Gerard Barry
- Running time: 44 minutes

Original release
- Network: Citytv; Planet Green
- Release: September 13, 2009

Conviction Kitchen is a Canadian documentary/reality television series that premiered September 13, 2009, on Citytv. Starring chef Marc Thuet and his wife Biana Zorich, the series documents the process of launching a restaurant, Conviction, in Toronto, to be staffed by rehabilitated ex-convicts.

A second series of Conviction Kitchen was recorded in Vancouver, British Columbia during the summer of 2010. The renowned but rundown restaurant Delilah's, located at 1789 Comox Street at Denman St, was temporarily rebranded as the Vancouver-based Conviction Kitchen.

An Australian version of the show was aired in 2011.

== See also ==
- Conviction Kitchen (Australia)
