= Marc Thuet =

French chef on Canadian TV

- Born: 1963 (age 62–63); Alsace, France
- Education: Lycée Hotelier in Strasbourg, France
- Culinary career
- Cooking style: French
- Current restaurant: Petite Thuet – Toronto
- Previous restaurant(s): Conviction Restaurant – Toronto Atelier Thuet – Toronto Bite Me! – Toronto Bistro Bakery Thuet- Toronto Thuet Cuisine – Toronto Centro – Toronto Windsor Arms Hotel – Toronto The Dorchester Terrace Dining Room – London
- Television show: Conviction Kitchen – Season 2 on air
- Website: www.thuet.ca

Marc Thuet (born 1963) is a chef based in Toronto, Ontario, Canada, who most recently appeared in his second season of a docu-reality TV series called Conviction Kitchen in which he trains 12 ex-cons to run a restaurant in Toronto.

== Life and career ==
Born in Alsace, France, Thuet is a fourth-generation chef who began his apprenticeship in his uncle's restaurant at age twelve. He received his formal training at the Lycée Hotelier in Strasbourg, France.

During his early professional years, Thuet worked in two and three star Michelin restaurants and hotels across Europe, including London's Dorchester under the tutelage of chef Anton Mosimann.

Thuet has headed the kitchen of many Toronto restaurants. In addition to being the executive chef of Petite Thuet, Atelier Thuet, and Bite Me!, he also opened a series of retail shops and a wholesale bakery.

Known for his use of locally grown produce purchased at local farmers markets, Thuet also travels to local Mennonite farms to purchase and butcher naturally-raised animals.

A cookbook by Thuet entitled French Food My Way was published in October 2010 by Penguin Publishing.

== Work history ==
- 2008 – Present: Petite Thuet – Toronto, Chef
- 2009–2010: Conviction Restaurant – Toronto, Chef
- 2007–2009: Atelier Thuet – Toronto, Chef
- 2008–2009: Bite Me! – Toronto, Chef
- 2005–2008: Bistro & Bakery Thuet – Toronto, Chef
- 2004–2004: Rosewater Supper Club – Toronto, Consulting Chef
- 2002–2004: The Fifth – Toronto, Executive Chef
- 1993–2002: Centro – Toronto, Co-owner, Executive Chef
- 1989–1993: Centro – Toronto, Sous Chef
- 1986–1989: Windsor Arms Hotel Courtyard Café; Three Small Rooms – Toronto, Executive Sous Chef
- 1984–1985: Harbour Castle Hilton – Toronto, Chef de Partie
- 1982–1983: The Dorchester Terrace Dining Room – London (England), Apprentice/Commis

== Education ==
- Restaurant Management, École Hôtelière, Strasbourg (France) (1980)

== See also ==
- Cuisine of Toronto
- King Street (Toronto)
