= Spit It Out (game show) =

- Genre: Game show
- Presented by: Elliot Spencer
- Country of origin: Australia
- Original language: English
- No. of series: 2
- No. of episodes: 130

Production
- Executive producers: Alan Curtis & Grant Rule
- Producer: Greg Moran
- Production locations: Melbourne, Victoria
- Running time: 30 minutes (including commercials)

Original release
- Network: Seven Network
- Release: 4 October 2010 – 3 October 2011

Spit It Out is an Australian children-oriented game show hosted by Elliot Spencer. The series premiered on 4 October 2010, in an afternoon time-slot, replacing It's Academic after its series 12 finale. Spit it out was originally invented by Alan Curtis as a board Game. This game was then further developed by Grant Rule and Alan Curtis into a Television game show.

== Format ==
Two school-based teams compete against each other in numerous word-related games. Each team has a clue leader, whom obtains the word given by the host. The leader tells the four other teammates to find the 'letter blocks' based on a clue. The team members then attempt to guess the word relating to the clue.

The series uses a round-robin format, meaning that each school competing has two chances to battle for the prizes. Elimination stages soon follow when the series finals draw near, which ultimately leads to one of the schools winning the major prize.

Unlike many other children's game shows which included Sydney-based schools and were produced in Sydney, this game show was the first in many years to include Victorian-based schools as well as being produced in Melbourne.

== Rounds ==
=== Head to Head ===
Both team leaders are given a mystery word, which along with their team-mates use gigantic foam blocks and place them on the clue bank (similar to Boggle) with only giving a clue to the word, and the team captains must guess the actual word. Teams get one guess per clue and 3 points for each words solved correctly.

=== Frenzee ===
In series one, two team members from each school use an electronic touch-screen device with fourteen random letters (nine consonants and all five vowels) and aim to create more as many four to seven letter words in ninety (90) seconds. If there is an 's' in the set of letters no plurals are allowed and names of people and places are not allowed. Teams score one point for each word they create. In the quarterfinals, for every seven letter word the team spells out, two points are scored instead.

In series two, the format was similar with a few alterations. Instead of the option to create words four letters or more, teams must find a four letter word, a five letter word, then a six or seven letter word in that order and then the cycle repeats itself until time. This is done to prevent teams from quickly finding four letter words that rhyme with each other or are homonyms as well as to find more words that are six or seven letters long. One point is scored for every four letter word, two points for every five letter word, three points for every six letter word and five points for every seven letter word.

=== Every Second Counts ===
Both clue leaders are again given a mystery word and with their team-mates place blocks on the table. The team captains have an option on which time during the round they want to have a guess, and if they do not guess the right answer, they will be locked out of guessing and the team doesn't have to provide anymore clues. The time limit is two minutes long and the points start at three points and increase by three points for every thirty seconds elapsed (maximum of twelve points). The mystery word is always an adjective.

=== Head to Head: With A Twist ===
Follows the format of Head to head with the exception of multiple points, depending on the remaining time. The first mystery word is worth ten points, the second mystery word is worth twenty points, the third thirty, fourth forty and so on. The time limit as in the first round is three minutes. During the final stages of the round, Elliot will allow any team to put down a clue. This allows the trailing team to quickly put in clues as the leading team could purposely run the clock down and win the game.

If the scores are tied after four rounds, a golden word tiebreaker will occur. In this tiebreaker, only one mystery word is given to both team leaders and provide the clues like in Head to head. The first team to correctly solve this word will score one point and win the game. There is no time limit in this tiebreaker.

== Series overview ==
Series	Episodes	Originally released	
Series	Episodes	First released	Last released
1	TBA	4 October 2010	2010
2	TBA	11 July 2011	3 October 2011
