= Territory Cops =

Australian factual TV series

- Title card of Season 2
- Genre: Factual television
- Narrated by: John Jarratt (season 2–present)
- Country of origin: Australia
- Original language: English
- No. of seasons: 3
- No. of episodes: 30

Production
- Production location: Northern Territory
- Running time: 24–27 minutes
- Production companies: Eyeworks Australia; McAvoy Media

Original release
- Network: Crime & Investigation Network (season 1); Network Ten (season 2–present)
- Release: 11 October 2012 – present

Related
- Gold Coast Cops; Kalgoorlie Cops

Territory Cops is an Australian factual television show that looks at the work of the police in Northern Territory, Australia. This observational documentary series began on the Crime and Investigation Network, premiering on 11 October 2012.

A second season of the series was commissioned by Network Ten in February 2016 to air in the first quarter. It was later announced that the new season would be narrated by Australian actor, and star of the Wolf Creek movie and TV series, John Jarratt.

In a February 2017 interview, Ten's Chief Content Officer Beverley McGarvey confirmed that there were no plans to air further seasons of the program.

After a five-year hiatus, a third series of Territory Cops was re-commissioned by Network Ten in October 2020, and was scheduled to premiere at 8:00 pm on 25 February 2021.

== Series overview ==
Series	Episodes	Originally released	
Series	Episodes	First released	Last released
1	10	11 October 2012	13 December 2012
2	10	15 March 2016	26 April 2016
3	10	25 February 2021	20 December 2021

== Episodes ==
=== Season 1 (2012) ===
No. overall	No. in season	Title	Original release date	Overnight Australian viewers
1	1	"Episode 1"	11 October 2012	57,000
Police lay eyes on two young blokes who are throwing punches at nightclub bouncers and are set to swoop on suspected remote community drug runners who are flying out of Katherine in a matter of minutes.
2	2	"Episode 2"	18 October 2012	45,000
Police attend a major peak hour road accident, before heading to Buffalo Creek to uphold fishing regulations, and racing off to investigate a report of a wild crocodile that has made its way onto the Stuart Highway.
3	3	"Episode 3"	25 October 2012	48,000
Police deal with a distressed man who claims his prescription medication has been stolen from him. Then, an urgent call comes in about an argument between two men that has suddenly turned violent.
4	4	"Episode 4"	1 November 2012	56,000
First up, it’s a case of ‘trouble in paradise’ as they sort out a couple in the middle of a Mexican standoff. Then it’s dealing with a particularly energetic young lady who has decided it is a clever idea to jump on the bonnet of a parked car.
5	5	"Episode 5"	8 November 2012	N/A
Constable Jen Young follows up a call about a cab driver who has been spontaneously attacked by a female passenger. Meanwhile, Police track down a hoon driver who has committed several public burn outs and speeding.
6	6	"Episode 6"	15 November 2012	N/A
Police are called to the aid of a young girl in distress who suspects her ex-boyfriend has stolen both her phone and handbag. They then pursue a drunk driver who is speeding through the suburbs at night without headlights.
7	7	"Episode 7"	22 November 2012	52,000
They’re the smallest mounted police unit in the Australia, but Senior Constable Courtney McCartney, Constable Kelly-Mae Walters and Constable Tanith Blair, who patrol Darwin on bikes show us the up side of having a 500kg animal by their side.
8	8	"Episode 8"	29 November 2012	N/A
Constables Sean ‘Wombat’ Holmes and Luke McIntosh are on their regular night patrol when they notice a car driving without lights on. As they move to follow the vehicle, the driver races off at top speed. The race is on to catch him.
9	9	"Episode 9"	6 December 2012	45,000
A massive contingent of police officers roll out across the Territory in Operation Shiloh – kicking off with a major highway lockdown to crack down on any possible offenders they come across on the road.
10	10	"Episode 10"	13 December 2012	N/A
It’s the night of Darwin’s Annual Hooker Ball and Police and the City Safe team are standing by to make sure the partygoers behave themselves. With a fair few ‘cheeky chaps’ around, these coppers are prepared to tackle anything and everything.

=== Season 2 (2016) ===
No. overall	No. in season	Title	Original release date	Overnight Australian viewers
11	1	"Episode 1"	15 March 2016	454,000
Star of Wolf Creek John Jarratt, narrates and takes us to Australia's most unforgiving landscapes, harshest conditions and introduces some of the hardest working cops in the country.
12	2	"Episode 2"	17 March 2016	515,000
The cops get a taste of local culture in a kebab shop, where they meet the business end of a flying stiletto. Plus, the search for a stolen car leads them to a croc infested quarry.
13	3	"Episode 3"	22 March 2016	529,000
With a string of drug and theft related offences already under their belts, two assailants are on the run from police again after CCTV camera footage captures them attempting to steal a car.
14	4	"Episode 4"	24 March 2016	415,000
The Strike force Trident is on a manhunt for a car thief and drug dealer who have been on the run for five weeks. Detective Sergeant Bradshaw and his team are called to a property in search of a major hydroponic set up.
15	5	"Episode 5"	29 March 2016	516,000
Sergeant Elliot and Constable Ozdemir are called to identify a heavily tattooed man who has been caught breaking into and vandalising Government House at 4am in Central Darwin on CCTV.
16	6	"Episode 6"	31 March 2016	519,000
Constables Brad Leggett and Mitchell Bell are only minutes away from finishing their night shift when an emergency call comes through alerting them of a horrific fatal crash between a bus and a car.
17	7	"Episode 7"	5 April 2016	463,000
Tizzy is heading up a raid on a well-known drug den when he discovers something unexpected. Plus, Sandi tries to calm down a bloke kicked out of a nightclub for a fight over a missing shoe.
18	8	"Episode 8"	12 April 2016	530,000
Constables Brad Leggett and Mitchell Bell are only minutes away from finishing their night shift when an emergency call comes through alerting them of a horrific fatal crash between a bus and a car.
19	9	"Episode 9"	19 April 2016	521,000
The cops are on the hunt for a thief who snatched a handbag from an unsuspecting grandmother. In this town it's pretty hard to be inconspicuous when you commit your crime on CCTV.
20	10	"Episode 10"	26 April 2016	518,000
Every year during Darwin's wet season, a strange phenomenon occurs in infamous Mitchell Street. When you mix heat, torrential rain and alcohol, you have got what the locals call 'Monsoon Madness'.

=== Season 3 (2021) ===
No. overall	No. in season	Title	Original release date	Overnight Australian viewers
21	1	"Episode 1"	25 February 2021	270,000
Patrolling a million square kilometres of harsh landscape, dangerous wildlife, wild weather and precarious criminals, take a look into Australia's busiest police force — the Northern Territory Police.
22	2	"Episode 2"	4 March 2021	402,000
Darwin cop Nathan answers a distressed call from two girls who've managed to drive their vehicle off the road and into a massive hole. What ensues is a daring desert rescue, with no room for error.
23	3	"Episode 3"	11 March 2021	397,000
A man, wanted for a serious domestic violence charge, has trapped himself on a balcony and is throwing missiles at police below. Will police negotiators be able to end the siege before tragedy ensues?
24	4	"Episode 4"	18 March 2021	266,000
A woman convinces the man she's hitching a ride with to stop off and buy her a pie. When he's inside, she takes the car and drives off, hitting him on her way, and a police chase to arrest her ensues.
25	5	"Episode 5"	25 March 2021	310,000
The Constables focus on a major drug and alcohol issue affecting the community and work on tracking down a career criminal specialising in theft.
26	6	"Episode 6"	8 April 2021	307,000
Bike cop Adrian Keogh pulls over a speeder whose identity is difficult to pin down, but a missing big toe gives him away, and Adrian discovers there's more to his story than a simple traffic offence.
27	7	"Episode 7"	15 April 2021	295,000
Detectives are at the scene of a serious crash that has one woman critically injured. It appears the cause of the crash is a handbrake pulled at speed, but who pulled it?
28	8	"Episode 8"	6 December 2021	269,000
Territory cops are on the hunt for a couple of brazen car thieves who have been caught in the act on CCTV. The investigation involves many twists and turns, as the suspects manage to elude the cops.
29	9	"Episode 9"	13 December 2021	N/A
30	10	"Episode 10"	20 December 2021	N/A
