= Top Design Australia =

- Starring: Jamie Durie; Amanda Talbot; Nick Tobias
- Country of origin: Australia
- Original language: English
- No. of seasons: 1
- No. of episodes: 9

Production
- Running time: 90 minutes (including commercials)
- Production company: Granada Australia

Original release
- Network: Nine Network
- Release: 13 July – 7 September 2011

Top Design Australia is a reality television series focusing on interior design and renovation, hosted by Jamie Durie. Durie also serves as main judge, along with design critic Amanda Talbot and architect Nick Tobias. The show is heavily based on the American series of the same name, with a similar format and elimination process. The winner of Top Design received $100,000 in prize money. The first episode premiered on 13 July 2011, on the Nine Network.

== Designers ==
Name	Age	Occupation	Status
Robert Davidov	29	Architect	Winner
Stephen Trupp	41	Youth worker	Runner-up
Lisa Christie	32	Interior designer	3rd place
Chris	33	Graphic artist	4th place
Dee Tang	29	Visual merchandiser	5th place
Dan Stephens	36	Graphic artist	6th place
Karl	47	Furniture designer	7th place
Katrina	43	Former design teacher	8th place
Kai Ieraci	27	Interior designer	9th place
Jo Bursill	39	Interior designer	10th place
Leigh Mccrabb	29	Carpet cleaner	11th place
Mary Tarling	54	Broker	12th place
Craig Voltz	49	Building/interior designer	13th place

== Elimination chart ==
Elimination progress
Designer	1	2	3		4^{1}	5	6 ^{2}	7 ^{3}	8			9
Robert	low	in	win	win	win	in	low	win	win	in	win	winner
Stephen	high	high	in	in	low	win	win	high	in	in	low	out
Lisa	high	high	high	in	in	low	low	low	win	win	low	out
Chris					high	in	win	in	in	in	out	
Dee	win	in	low	in	high	high	high	out				
Dan	in	win	low	high	in	in	out					
Karl					in	WD						
Katrina					low	out						
Kai	in	in	low	low	out							
Jo	low	low	in	out								
Leigh	high	low	out									
Mary	low	out										
Craig	out											

The designer won the competition
The designer won the challenge
The designer was eliminated
The designer had a high score for the challenge
The designer had a low score for the challenge
The designer was in the bottom two
The designer voluntarily left the competition

^Note 1: Chris, Karl & Katrina were introduced to the competition in week 4.
^Note 2: The judges declared both Chris and Stephen had won the challenge.
^Note 3: Dee stated that she was "burnt out" and had come as far as she could go, Jamie then eliminated her.

== Episodes ==
=== Episode one ===
Original airdate: 13 July 2011

For their first challenge, the designers were split into pairs. Their task was to create a living space in and around a single shipping container in four days and with a budget of $25,000.

Teams
Robert & Mary
Jo & Craig
Dan & Kai
Steve & Lisa
Dee & Leigh

Steven and Lisa's room was very well received, though they were chastised for going $4000 over budget. Dee and Leigh's room with a modular deck was praised, and Dee ultimately won the challenge. In the end, Craig & Jo, and Robert and Mary's rooms impressed the judges the least, but a dignified Craig paid the ultimate price for having an incompetent carpenter who could not complete the work he was assigned.

- Winner: Dee Tang
- Eliminated: Craig Voltz

=== Episode two ===
Original airdate: 20 July 2011

The designers were split into three teams and tasked with turning a small studio apartment into a bachelor pad for a celebrity client; actor Daniel Amalm, ironman Caine Eckstein, or radio hosts Ant & Beck. Teams had a budget of 15,000 for the challenge.

Teams	Client
Dee, Kai & Robert	Ant & Becks
Steve, Dan & Lisa	Daniel Amalm
Leigh, Jo & Mary	Caine Eckstein

During the challenge, Jo had to be taken to hospital after receiving an electric shock while cleaning the walls. Meanwhile, Dan constantly butted heads with Steve & Lisa over their design; his teammates feeling he became very defensive towards them. Despite this, their room was unanimously considered the best of the week, with Dan having the top design. Leigh, Jo and Mary had the least impressive design, which was considered too safe and boring by the judges, and it was Mary who was eliminated after the judges felt she contributed the least to their room.

- Winner: Dan Stephens
- Eliminated: Mary Tarling

=== Episode three ===
Original airdate: 27 July 2011

This week's episode featured two different challenges. For the first challenge, the designers were split into teams in order to create a tranquil outdoor oasis atop a parking garage, based on one of the four elements. The outdoor rooms were also required to convey a sense of privacy.

Teams	Element
Dee & Dan	Earth
Leigh & Kai	Fire
Robert & Lisa	Air
Jo & Steve	Water

During judging, Jamie stated that the quality of everyone's work was exceptionally high, making the elimination extremely tough. Robert won with his and Lisa's Mediterranean inspired garden, complete with overhead sails. Even though their bushfire-themed garden was well received, Leigh and Kai placed in the bottom two for not conveying a sense of privacy and tranquillity in their design. In the end, Leigh was eliminated, as the judges felt he focused too much on construction and not enough on design.

- Winner: Robert Davidov
- Eliminated: Leigh Mccrabb

The second challenge featured two parts. The designers were first tasked with individually designing a chair within a two-hour time frame. Dee's chair was voted the best, and she opted to work individually for the second part of the challenge. The rest of the designers were paired up and tasked with creating a room designed around one or both of the team members' chairs.

Teams
Jo & Kai
Dan & Robert
Steve & Lisa
Dee

Throughout the challenge, Dan & Robert clashed on their design, opting to incorporate their own personal styles into their room. However, their quirky design was very well received, and Robert won his second challenge in a row. Jo & Kai's French boudoir felt too empty, and they were placed in the bottom two. The judges struggled to make a decision, and Kai was saved for her decision to create a raised dressing room in the centre of the space, thus sending Jo home in her third bottom two appearance.

- Winner: Robert Davidov
- Eliminated: Jo Bursill

=== Episode four ===
Original airdate: 3 August 2011

Immediately after the last elimination, Jamie announced that three new designers would be joining the competition, much to everyone's dismay. For their next challenge, the nine designers were split into three teams and challenged to create a high end, expensive hotel suite based around an international theme. Teams had three days and a budget of $50,000 for the challenge.

Teams	Theme
Dee, Robert & Chris	New York
Steve, Kai & Katrina	French Provincial
Lisa, Dan & Karl	Mexico

All contestants had various degrees of difficulty warming up to their new teammates, but none more so than Dan, who constantly clashed with Karl and his equally boisterous personality. On the other end of the scale, Robert felt that Dee and Chris were becoming too close and not pulling their own weight in the challenge. Despite this, the judges loved their New York-inspired room, and Robert won his third consecutive challenge. The French Provincial suite was the judges' least impressive, and Kai's dwindling performance in the competition sent her home.

- Winner: Robert Davidov
- Eliminated: Kai Ieraci

=== Episode five ===
Original airdate: 10 August 2011

In this episode the designers were split into pairs and tasked with renovating an old, grungy caravan for specific clients. They soon found out that their clients were members of their families. Teams had 3 days and $10,000 for the challenge.

Teams
Dee & Steve
Dan & Chris
Karl & Robert
Katrina & Lisa

Both Lisa and Robert struggled to work with their partners, with Robert and Karl constantly bickering throughout the challenge. Dee and Steve were the joint winners of the challenge, the judges loving their 1970s inspired design. Katrina was eliminated from the competition as the judges felt there was none of her design in her caravan. Jamie announced that Lisa should also take some blame for their loss, and was about to eliminate her too, when Karl voluntarily left the show, stating a family illness as his reason.

- Winner: Steve Trupp
- Eliminated: Katrina
- Withdrew: Karl

=== Episode six ===
Original airdate: 17 August 2011

The remaining designers were first tasked with treating an item of furniture out of recycled objects. It was also announced that for winning the last challenge, Steve had won immunity this week. Once their pieces were finished it was then revealed that everyone would be working individually to create a room based around their creation, predominantly using recycled furniture.

The judges were very impressed with Dee, Chris and Steve, and both Chris and Steve had won the challenge as the judges could not settle for one outright winner. Robert was criticized for using far too much new material in his room, and he wound up in the bottom two. However, it was Dan who was eliminated for his unstable and incorrectly measured recycled table, and for being unable to properly finish and clear up his room within the time limit.

- Winner: Steve Trupp & Chris
- Eliminated: Dan Stephens

== Episode ratings ==
Colour key:
– Highest rating during the series
– Lowest rating during the series

Episode		Airdate	Timeslot	Viewers (in millions)	Rank	Ref
1	Series premiere	13 July 2011	Wednesday 8:30 pm	1.156	#5	
2	Episode 2	20 July 2011	Wednesday 8:30 pm	0.799	#12	
3	Episode 3	27 July 2011	Wednesday 8:30 pm	0.691	#15	
4	Episode 4	3 August 2011	Wednesday 8:30 pm	0.590	#19	
5	Episode 5	10 August 2011	Wednesday 8:30 pm	0.635	#18	
6	Episode 6	17 August 2011	Wednesday 8:30 pm	0.610	#20	
7	Episode 7	24 August 2011	Wednesday 8:30 pm	—N/a	—N/a	
8	Episode 8	31 August 2011	Wednesday 8:30 pm	0.210	#47	
9	Grand finale	7 September 2011	Wednesday 8:30 pm	0.207	#51	

== See also ==
- The Block
