= Conviction Kitchen (Australian TV series) =

2011 Australian reality TV series

- Genre: Reality
- Starring: Ian Curley (chef); Lisa Parker (manager)
- Country of origin: Australia
- Original language: English
- No. of seasons: 1
- No. of episodes: 8

Production
- Executive producer: Elizabeth Egan

Original release
- Network: Seven Network
- Release: 22 February – 12 April 2011

Conviction Kitchen (Australia) is a reality television series based on a Canadian series of the same name. The series follows a group of convicted criminals as they train in either back or front of house restaurant operations.

The show was produced by the Seven Network and began on 22 February 2011. The series includes the Melbourne-based chef Ian Curley and the restaurant manager Lisa Parker as mentors.

Curley initially turned down the chance to star in the series as he felt there were already more than enough TV chefs. He later relented as he felt he could relate to the contestants. As a teenager, Curley himself had been convicted of aggravated assault for gang fighting and spent six months in a juvenile detention centre in his native England.

The series saw the ex-inmates complete two weeks of training and six weeks working in a fully operational restaurant, Bistro Three, at the Emporium centre in Brisbane's Fortitude Valley. Some were chosen to work front of house with the others training as kitchen staff. They earned the minimum hourly wage, plus tips.

At the end of the series, two contestants, Anastasia from the kitchen staff and Silene from the front of house, were chosen to work with Curley at the European. Kristy and Troy also gained further employment from Curley.

== Contestants ==
| Name | Age | Time spent in jail | Reason for conviction | Selected | Position |
|---|---|---|---|---|---|
| Adrian | 27 | 12 months | break and enter | yes | front of house |
| Anastasia | 19 | 6 months | theft | yes | kitchen |
| Anthony | 18 | 18 months probation | break and enter | yes | kitchen |
| Belinda | 35 | 18 month probation | fraud | yes | front of house |
| Craig | | | break and enter | no | |
| David | 22 | 4 months | driving offences | yes | front of house |
| James | | | | no | |
| Jared | 27 | 5 years | break and enter | yes | kitchen |
| Josh | 25 | 5 years | burglary | yes | kitchen |
| Kristy | 25 | 6 months probation | fraud | yes | kitchen |
| Kylie | 34 | 1 year | dangerous driving | no | |
| Lisa | 27 | 9 months | fraud | yes | front of house |
| Mirjana | 45 | 8 years | trafficking | yes | front of house |
| Rebecca | | | | yes | |
| Silene | 37 | 1 year | drug offences | yes | front of house |
| Takuna | | | assault | no | |
| Troy | 39 | 8 years | | yes | kitchen |

== See also ==
- Conviction Kitchen (Canada)
