= Between the Lines (game show) =

- Genre: Game show; Sport
- Presented by: Eddie McGuire
- Starring: Mick Molloy; Ryan Fitzgerald
- Country of origin: Australia
- Original language: English
- No. of seasons: 1
- No. of episodes: 4

Production
- Running time: 60 minutes (including adverts)

Original release
- Network: Nine Network
- Release: 12 May – 2 June 2011

Between the Lines is a game show which was broadcast on Nine Network in Australia. It was a sports-themed comedy show featuring two teams of three players going head-to-head in a quiz. The show was premiered on 12 May 2011 and was hosted by Eddie McGuire with team captains Mick Molloy and Ryan Fitzgerald.
