= In Their Footsteps =

2011 Australian TV documentary series

- Created by: Shine
- Country of origin: Australia
- No. of seasons: 1
- No. of episodes: 10

Production
- Running time: 60 minutes

Original release
- Network: Nine Network
- Release: 8 May – 10 July 2011

In Their Footsteps is a ten-part documentary depicting Australian families and war. The first episode aired in Australia on 8 May 2011 on the Nine Network. In each episode an Australian will retrace the steps of a close ancestor's wartime experience.

== Series One (2011) ==
No.	Title
1	"Tommy Johnson"
2	"Tony Boyd"
3	"Ronald and Ernest Cavalier"
4	"Albert Moore"
5	"Billy Brandis"
6	"Hippo Hippisley"
7	"Bill Healey"
8	"George Hannaford"
9	"Les Semken"
