= The Force: Behind the Line =

2006–2020 Australian TV series

- Genre: Documentary
- Narrated by: Simon Reeve
- Country of origin: Australia
- Original language: English
- No. of seasons: 14

Production
- Executive producer: Dan Meenan
- Running time: 30 minutes
- Production company: Seven Studios

Original release
- Network: Seven Network
- Release: 22 August 2006 – 19 May 2020

The Force: Behind the Line is an Australian documentary television series about the Western Australia Police and the New South Wales Police, hosted by Simon Reeve and aired nationally on the Seven Network from 22 August 2006. Similarly to Border Security: Australia's Front Line and the American Cops series, each episode intermixes three or four investigations per episode.

== Format ==
The Force is filmed in metropolitan and regional Western Australia and New South Wales. Small camera crews follow the police around during their daily duties. Field producer Tim Noonan said the only rule in filming was that the camera crews "can't hinder [the police] in any way". As a result, some footage is filmed from police cars or a safe distance away from the police, with wireless microphones used to record audio.

The Western Australian Police retained the right to veto any material which posed legal problems, such as footage identifying underage offenders or matters before the courts. Techniques such as pixelisation are used to satisfy legal requirements. The program also blurred out the faces of police officers not wishing to be identified on national television.

Murder Manhunt
21 second sample from episode 1 of The Force

Shark Scare
30 second sample from episode 2 of The Force

Audio samples from The Force showing its use of narration and background music.

Episodes of The Force comprise three or four individual stories featuring police officers going about everyday duties, including burglaries, drug-related cases, traffic cases and murder investigations. The choice of stories is usually balanced to include action-oriented stories as well as more mundane stories such as family disputes.

== History ==
The Seven Network first announced The Force (then untitled) on 23 November 2005. The program underwent a number of name changes, including Police Patrol and True Blue, before the eventual title was finally announced in June 2006.

The Western Australia Police was the only police service to agree to be filmed in the first two series of the show. Lawyers for the Western Australia Police opposed the move, but Police Commissioner Karl O'Callaghan convinced them otherwise. O'Callaghan was keen for the project, and viewed the program as "a great opportunity to give the community a better understanding of the good and bad parts of policing." A third season began airing in February 2008. The 12th season premiered on 27 July 2016.

As of October 2017 season 1-3 are available on Tubi TV in the United States.

== Episodes ==
=== Season 1 ===
No. overall	No. in season	Title	Original release date
1	1	TBA	22 August 2006
A manhunt is on for a double murderer with a load gun and a hit list. Police raid a home of a suspected drug dealer. An identity crisis has police baffled. A heated neighbour dispute gets out of hand.
2	2	TBA	29 August 2006
The Tactical Response Group (TRG) step in as a dangerous criminal plans his next hit. Water police spot a large shark heading towards a group of swimmers. Police are caught up in the middle of a family feud.
3	3	TBA	6 September 2006
Detectives go on the hunt for two brothers who may be linked to a spate of burglaries that have been terrifying locals. Detectives move in on a massive multi million dollar drug ring. A speeding motorbike rider is on the run from the cops.
4	4	TBA	13 September 2006
Detectives mount a massive manhunt for one of Australia's most ruthless criminals. Water police are on the hunt for brazen thieves as a luxury land cruiser is ransacked. A man's behavior leaves police suspicious.
5	5	TBA	20 September 2006
A police chase up close as the cops go after a motorbike traveling at a deadly speed. Police have been called to a bushfire that's making headlines. Caught red-handed. A chance encounter with the police gives new meaning to the term pot luck.
6	6	TBA	27 September 2006
Armed police are on the hunt for a man with a violent history. A suspicious package has a city on high alert. A runaway horse heads dangerously close to a busy motorway
7	7	TBA	4 October 2006
A suburban party turns feral. Two men say they're in the forest for a nature walk but police know better. On Australia's longest single stretch of road, police stalk the biggest killers -fatigue and speed.
8	8	TBA	11 October 2006
Police suspect there's a live body in the boot of a car. Police raid the premises of a notorious bikie gang. Police cop an earful from an angry driver caught drink driving at double the speed limit.
9	9	TBA	18 October 2006
A massive search in a national park begins for cannabis worth millions. The cops are called to a bizarre car accident. A graffiti vandal is caught red-handed.
10	10	TBA	25 October 2006
Police close in on a peeping tom who is secretly filming couples in a lover's lane. The hunt is on for an elusive armed robber. Police raid a suburban property they believe contains large quantities of drugs.
11	11	TBA	31 October 2006
While traffic police are giving a vehicle a yellow sticker, an accident nearly happens at a nearby junction; the car involved is asked to pull over but the driver decides to back into the busy intersection and take off.
12	12	TBA	7 November 2006
On a train line known for high criminal activity, undercover officers have observed two unsuspecting men doing a drug deal on surveillance video. It's past midnight and the police have been called in to put a stop to the harassment.
13	13	TBA	14 November 2006
Water Police are patrolling a notorious stretch of the Indian ocean known as 'shark alley'. They're on high alert after a Great White shark was spotted several days ago attacking a whale carcass just off the coast.

=== Season 2 ===
No. overall	No. in season	Title	Original release date
14	1	TBA	11 July 2007
The hunt is on for a sexual predator on The Force: Behind the Line. Police search for a body in a dam. And lovesick cowboy is pulled over for speeding.
15	2	TBA	18 July 2007
Football fans find themselves in trouble on and off the field on The Force: Behind the Line. A truck driver loses his cool after being sold a dodgy phone. And a driver is caught speeding way over the limit.
16	3	TBA	15 August 2007
A young man terrorises the community with a loaded gun on The Force: Behind the Line. A recently smashed car has been abandoned and the driver is nowhere to be seen. And water police find themselves in the middle of a fiery rescue.
17	4	TBA	22 August 2007
It's a mother's worst nightmare as a nine year-old-boy goes missing on The Force: Behind the Line. A positive DNA hit brings an offender face to face with his criminal past.
18	5	TBA	27 August 2007
A criminal makes a daring escape on The Force: Behind the Line. A local carpenter is suspected of drug activity. And two squatters get a helping hand from police.
19	6	TBA	3 September 2007
A suspicious parcel is left at the front desk of a police station on The Force: Behind the Line. Is it a bomb or just a scare? A young P plater is devastated after a crash badly injures an elderly woman.
20	7	TBA	10 September 2007
A streetwalker and her client are caught in the act on The Force: Behind the Line. A bad boy is in trouble with the cops – again. And will a Dad's joy ride with his kids end happily?
21	8	TBA	17 September 2007
Police confront a woman accused of identity theft on The Force: Behind the Line. A hold-up gets out of hand at a petrol station. And a man attempts to swallow a bag of drugs during a routine traffic stop.
22	9	TBA	1 October 2007
Officers put all their skills to the test as a man goes on an angry rampage on The Force: Behind the Line. A political stand becomes a heated stand off. And a simple mistake takes a chef out of the frying pan and into the fire.
23	10	TBA	8 October 2007
A robbery spree has a city on edge on The Force: Behind the Line. It will take one detective and his team to stop the burglar in his tracks. A petrol spill could turn into a major disaster. And a man finds himself in deep trouble after lying to police.
24	11	TBA	15 October 2007
Police raid a home suspected of housing marijuana on The Force: Behind the Line. A teenager is caught driving seven times over the legal limit. And a routine boat stop turns treacherous as the driver decides to do a runner.
25	12	TBA	22 October 2007
A domestic argument spirals out of control on The Force: Behind the Line. An agitated man with a loaded gun is holed up inside his home with his two young daughters. Can an expert negotiator talk him outside without anyone getting hurt?
26	13	TBA	29 October 2007
Detectives prepare a shock raid on a suspected drug house on The Force: Behind the Line. Traffic cops want to know what a young driver is running from. And a woman's ex-husband loses control on a visit with his kids.

=== Season 3 ===
No. overall	No. in season	Title	Original release date
27	1	TBA	11 February 2008
A police blitz in Sydney's northern beaches proves that no one is above the law. Police officers in Murdoch find a woman who can't remember her name and isn't carrying any identification. A midnight raid in inner suburban Perth catches an elusive crook by surprise.
28	2	TBA	18 February 2008
Perth police are caught in the middle of a fierce neighbourhood battle. Friends of a drunk teenage girl have a good reason to report her to the police in Margaret River. A street in suburban Perth becomes the target of a major raid when police suspect that it has a drug laboratory.
29	3	TBA	25 February 2008
A police discovery turns a routine traffic stop into a major crime case. A police team track an escaped prisoner. A quick-thinking police officer comes to the rescue of two children when their mother locks herself out of a unit.
30	4	TBA	3 March 2008
A reckless driver turns the streets of suburban Perth lethal. Nine years after a woman is almost stabbed to death, police find their suspect in London. A disturbing call-out about a man in army fatigues wielding a gun has a surprise ending.
31	5	TBA	10 March 2008
Police hunt a man who has been terrifying his community in Perth with a loaded gun. A lovesick cowboy finds himself in trouble with the police again. Police destroy more than $200,000 worth of drugs after several raids in Kalgoorlie. Police are put into the firing line at a rowdy party.
32	6	TBA	21 July 2008
A robber who has broken into numerous Flight Centre franchises and has a notorious criminal as a mentor cannot outsmart the police. Two men are pulled over during a police operation in Sydney's western suburbs, but only one of them will walk free. Bernie refuses to leave a real estate agent until she gets paid for the gardening work she has done.
33	7	TBA	28 July 2008
A father of two is busted trying to grow cannabis. Maureen has a classic clash with police over road rules. Police make a dangerous arrest after a wanted criminal flies into a crowded airport.
34	8	TBA	25 August 2008
A convoy of Tactical Response Group vehicles stuck in a traffic jam find themselves in the right place at the right time when a stolen car approaches them. A young mother loses her innocence when she finds herself in trouble with the law. A grandfather's disappearance has everyone worried.
35	9	TBA	1 September 2008
Police officers face their worst nightmare when a man confronts them with a knife during a drug raid. In northern New South Wales, police track down a hidden stash of cannabis. A routine registration check becomes a costly lesson for a P-plate driver.
36	10	TBA	8 September 2008
When two dangerous armed bandits terrorise Perth, police prepare to take them on when they arrest them during a dawn raid. The dog squad sniff out drugs on several people attending the Big Day Out concert in Sydney. A dangerous driver who puts peoples' lives at risk thinks he has done nothing wrong.
37	11	TBA	15 September 2008
Police claim back the city streets of Sydney when they arrest three teenagers who filmed their bashing of a homeless man with a mobile phone camera. A young V8 driver who is caught traveling at more than double the speed limit thinks the police have got it all wrong. The bomb squad face the risky job of dealing with a dangerous gas tank found on a busy beach on the north coast of New South Wales.
38	12	TBA	22 September 2008
A man faces court ten years after he viciously attacked his fiancée. When a wife becomes concerned that her missing husband's life may be in danger, police have to find him quickly. Police do their best to keep an intoxicated man from getting into serious trouble on a busy Friday night in Manly.
39	13	TBA	29 September 2008
A driver that police pulled over for an expired license ends up in bigger strife after a search of his car. Police search for the source of a DVD piracy racket that is worth a big fortune. A dangerous criminal who has been terrorizing innocent people in a series of armed hold-ups is on the loose in a shopping center in suburban Perth.
40	14	TBA	6 October 2008
A thief makes a desperate bid to escape, but is run over by the car he stole. Police officers are astounded by the number of passengers in an unlicensed driver's van. A raid on a carpenter's house and factory uncovers his more lucrative cash business involving drugs.
41	15	TBA	13 October 2008
A police dog goes in search of four crooks who go on the run after crashing a stolen luxury car. Could a random breath test take a taxi driver off the road? What police find in the shed of an armed man roaming the streets raises the stakes.
42	16	TBA	20 October 2008
A gunman on the loose in a quiet suburban street has neighbours terrified. A woman refuses to accept that a party is over for the night. When police stop a stolen car, a frightening discovery has them on guard.
43	17	TBA	27 October 2008
Police hope to prevent a dangerous chase when they close in on a stolen prestige car. Police go on an urgent mission to find a young woman whose life is in danger. Officers have their hands full after they pull over a speeding skipper.

=== Season 4 ===
No. overall	No. in season	Title	Original release date
44	1	TBA	19 April 2009
Traffic enforcement officers are focused on keeping the roadways safe and that means making sure those behind the wheel are licensed to be there.
45	2	TBA	26 April 2009
Detectives from Morley station have responded to a call an armed man is threatening people in Mt Lawley. Dangerous homemade chemicals are found in a suburban bedroom in Sydney then destroyed by Police Rescue at another location. In Darwin, a driver who has been drinking has made a lucky escape from his work vehicle following a serious crash.
46	3	TBA	3 May 2009
PCs Chris and Shane are called to shut down a noisy party after anonymous neighbours have complained to police.
47	4	TBA	10 May 2009
It's late on a Saturday night and officers from the Major Incident Group are patrolling the suburbs south of Perth after reports an expensive high powered luxury car has been stolen from a nearby address.
48	5	TBA	17 May 2009
A bank has been robbed by a desperate man. CCTV pictures show him pistol whipping the only customer before fleeing. He is well known to police who mount an intensive manhunt to capture this increasingly dangerous and volatile criminal. Elsewhere, two brothers' loyalty to one another is put to the test following a minor car accident they've been involved in. The driver insists it was someone now absent from the scene who crashed the car headlong into a fence, and the passenger initially refuses to say anything, but finally admits to police it was his brother who crashed the car. In Sydney, a drug dog operation has railway passengers anxious. One is sniffed out by the sniffer dog not long after smoking marijuana. Another is in trouble with police after they see her throw a container of ice onto the tracks.
49	6	TBA	24 May 2009
Detectives from the Regional Investigations Unit are on the hunt for a one man crime wave. Brett Klimczak was supposed to be on drug detention but has skipped out on his court ordered rehab and is now breaking into houses and stealing cars almost daily. In Sydney, a woman's safety is threatened when an argument she has with her ex-husband turns violent. A passer-by who witnesses the argument alerts police, and the ex-spouses are taken to a police station for questioning. In Perth, police are called to help sort out a blue between two friends over a drug debt. Whilst at the scene, one of the two friends admits he brought an iron bar with him, but claims it was almost for self-defence. He is charged with possessing the iron bar with intent to injure and police confiscate the article.
50	7	TBA	31 May 2009
Sgt Castledine and Const. Ayre are doing their usual street patrols, when they notice a woman who isn't wearing a seatbelt. That isn't the only offense this young mum has committed tonight.
51	8	TBA	7 June 2009
Detectives gather in a parking lot to discuss last minute plans to take out a suspect who they believe to be a dangerous armed robber. A couple weeks earlier, two masked men armed with a shotgun and a knife confronted a local drug dealer, turning into a bloody attack which could have easily eventuated in murder. Have police found their man?
52	9	TBA	14 June 2009
Officers are mystified when they discover a Nissan with four slashed tyres deserted on a country roadside. They get a call that a man who claims the car is his, has been found nearby and he has a lot of cash plus a knife on him.
53	10	TBA	21 June 2009
An armed hold-up has just happened at a busy restaurant. Witnesses saw a green Falcon nearby and police find the owner running away from the scene.
54	11	TBA	28 June 2009
When an explosion rocks a peaceful suburb the Clandestine Drug unit are called in to investigate. The chemicals used in drug manufacturing are potentially lethal and the team track down the perpetrator to his next hideout
55	12	TBA	28 June 2009
An urgent call has police rushing to a scene at a local Pharmacy. After being denied an order of prescription drugs, a suspected drug addict has held up a female member of staff with a blood filled syringe.
56	13	TBA	2009
Detectives are on the hunt for a fugitive wanted for attempted murder. Considered highly dangerous and a known drug user, the fugitive has given police the slip twice already.

=== Season 5 ===
No. overall	No. in season	Title	Original release date
57	1	TBA	20 September 2009
58	2	TBA	27 September 2009
59	3	TBA	4 October 2009
60	4	TBA	11 October 2009
61	5	TBA	18 October 2009
62	6	TBA	25 October 2009
63	7	TBA	1 November 2009
64	8	TBA	8 November 2009
65	9	TBA	15 November 2009
66	10	TBA	22 November 2009
67	11	TBA	30 November 2009
68	12	TBA	7 December 2009
69	13	TBA	14 December 2009
70	14	TBA	21 December 2009

=== Season 6 ===
No. overall	No. in season	Title	Original release date
71	1	TBA	11 April 2010
The police's eye in the sky spots a hoon. A drug dealer is intercepted by police on the street in a known drug dealing area then taken to a police station where he's charged with dealing. A desperate and dangerous man robs a service station where he used to work. A toddler is in distress thanks to his heavily intoxicated father.
72	2	TBA	18 April 2010
Police go all out to destroy forests of cannabis and catch the growers, plus brazen crooks on camera in a wealthy suburb.
73	3	TBA	25 April 2010
GPS technology leads police to the location of a stolen car, a suspected cannabis growers multiple sites are searched.
74	4	TBA	2 May 2010
the mightiest part of the force under threat from drunken revelers, deadly secrets inside what appears to be an ordinary suburban home, and a young man refuses to learn an important lesson.
75	5	TBA	9 May 2010
The hunt for a prison escapee leads detectives to one of the biggest hauls ever. Police control revellers at the annual Spring in the Valley festival. A criminal is caught in the act, but what he holds has police baffled.
76	6	TBA	16 May 2010
Detectives close in on an elaborate drug ring. A family gets locked inside a cemetery. A Porsche flies by police while the driver is over the legal alcohol limit.
77	7	TBA	23 May 2010
Logging protesters are in danger and the race is on as drug dealers rush to offload their merchandise.
78	8	TBA	30 May 2010
A country town erupts and police rush to quell the riot. Detectives systematically search a house and uncover a secret stash.
79	9	TBA	6 June 2010
Detectives from Strike Force Sappa receive a new lead into two large scale drug syndicates. Following a night out that's gone wrong, a P-plater learns a hard lesson. Two Perth locals join police to hunt down a man terrorizing a community.
80	10	TBA	13 June 2010
Police respond to a domestic disturbance, drugged drivers at the snow and Regional Investigations Unit police are on the hunt for two aggressive armed...
81	11	TBA	13 June 2010
Police respond to a domestic disturbance, drugged drivers at the snow and Regional Investigations Unit police are on the hunt for two aggressive armed...

=== Season 7 ===
No. overall	No. in season	Title	Original release date
82	1	TBA	6 February 2011
83	2	TBA	2011
84	3	TBA	2011
85	4	TBA	2011
86	5	TBA	2011
87	6	TBA	2011
88	7	TBA	2011
89	8	TBA	2011
90	9	TBA	2011
91	10	TBA	2011

=== Season 8 ===
No. overall	No. in season	Title	Original release date
92	1	TBA	8 May 2012
The Middle Eastern Organised Crime's highway unit are out on the streets looking at different known hot spots throughout Sydney. After witnessing a white Subaru acting strangely they find out that they have a serial offender on their hands. The police are on the look out for a violent armed robber who held up a massage parlour in Perth.
93	2	TBA	22 May 2012
A couple of houses are raised by the NSW State Crime Command before they close in on the ringleader following a massive operation. Two officers patrolling the streets of Darwin end up finding the night taking a shocking turn after they're called to a car thought to be carrying a firearm. The Fairfield Highway Patrol stop a stolen car
94	3	TBA	28 May 2012
One of the worse crimes the force has ever dealt with is an online sexual predator who is targeting young girls. They go deep under cover with officers from the Child Exploitation Unit as they lay the bait to capture the man. The police respond to robbery reports at a house in Perth and are shocked at what they discover.
95	4	TBA	4 June 2012
Martin Riley is already a wanted man and he is only nineteen years old. He has been committing some serious burglaries and leaving countless lives at risk fleeing from police in stolen cars. The police set up a roadblock on one of Australia's busiest highways, with the help of the NSW Police Dog Unit to help identify people moving drugs.
96	5	TBA	11 June 2012
A man has been reported as missing on a lonely Perth beach in very strange circumstances. The police launch a full-scale land and sea search after dark in a very baffling case.
97	6	TBA	18 June 2012
The police take a look at a case of missing victims after occupants of a badly damaged vehicle are seen fleeing the scene of a car crash. The cameras follow motorcycle cops Matt Rudd and Terry Fryer as they patrol through Sydney's busy motorways.
98	7	TBA	14 November 2012
Some officers from the Middle Eastern Organised Crime Squad chase an orange turbo charged car. The driver of the car is having difficulty controlling her temper after police find some cannabis in the vehicle. Perth's Chemical Operations Team raid a suspected Meth-Lab. Officers of Rescue 22 are called out assist in two very different rescue situations.
99	8	TBA	21 November 2012
Some of the Auburn Detectives are getting ready to arrest a gang of violent armed robbers. Officers in Perth see a car driving erratically.

=== Season 9 ===
No. overall	No. in season	Title	Original release date
100	1	TBA	3 February 2013
101	2	TBA	10 February 2013
102	3	TBA	17 February 2013
103	4	TBA	24 February 2013
Operation Karup is a huge operation for Perth's Child Sex Crime police department. Using new computer technology, the police are able to pinpoint people accessing child exploitation material on the Internet.
104	5	TBA	3 March 2013
The police target a POI who has led them on a pursuit through the city streets. They surround his house but not even a phone call from a relative will get him to leave the building.
105	6	TBA	10 March 2013
Officers in Perth have received a call needing assistance with a search warrant. It is believed that an illegal clandestine lab is in the house, which is extremely dangerous for police and anyone nearby. Police in Darwin make their way to the scene of a reported armed robbery.
106	7	TBA	17 March 2013
The police raid a property on Sydney's Northern Beaches after a well-known drug supplier looks like he is up to his old tricks again. 'Police dog Rumble' is about to have his abilities tested.
107	8	TBA	24 March 2013
Police are on a manhunt for a wanted fugitive called Brett Klimczak, who has escaped from prison. Klimczak is causing havoc across the city, stealing vehicles. He is also desperate not to be caught, making him dangerous. Late-night shopping in Perth attracts shoplifters, and some women's clothing has been stolen.
108	9	TBA	14 April 2013
A child sex predator has attempted to become friends with who he thinks is a 13-year-old girl on the internet. What he doesn't know is that he is actually talking detectives from the Sex Crime division.
109	10	TBA	1 May 2013
Police in the state of Victoria receive information about a man who allegedly has a firearm hidden inside a secret compartment in his car. General Duties Officers spot something suspicious as they drive pass a well known drug house.
110	11	TBA	5 May 2013
Campsie Proactives sees a familiar face driving a car unlicensed, which they think is a stolen vehicle. Detectives receive an anonymous information of a hydroponic being set up in Spearwood.
111	12	TBA	8 May 2013
A couple of Irish tourists decide to take a swim fully clothed in the Yarra River having drunk a few beers. What looks like a fun idea at the time has resulted in a tragedy, and a local barman has braved the cold water to help save them.
112	13	TBA	12 May 2013
The police in NSW stumble upon a car on its side in the middle of the road. A group of officers hit a house in the hope of disrupting the flow of stolen equipment and drugs in the region.
113	14	TBA	26 May 2013
Water police officers carry out some spot checks on commercial crabbers to make sure they're complying with the law in the Northern Territory. Constables from the Farifield Anti-Theft Squad observe three men acting suspiciously.
114	15	TBA	2 June 2013
Detectives in Armidale have learnt that two men have been committing serious robberies and are armed with guns.
115	16	TBA	9 June 2013
Chinatown's popular night markets are raided by the police because some of the stallholders are selling counterfeit good. Two officers are on duty as they receive a priority 2 call to attend a house that's been broken into by a man they think to be armed with a gun.
116	17	TBA	16 June 2013
Detectives attempt to find Roland Riley who's been on the run for more than four weeks. The police have to deal with a road rage incident where a man has been deliberately smashed into.
117	18	TBA	14 July 2013
In Western Australia, police officers from the Online Child Exploitation Squad are taking part in Operation Allerton which targets people downloading and distributing images and videos of children on the internet.
118	19	TBA	3 September 2013
Officers stop a dodgy looking car whilst out on patrol and find out that the driver doesn't have a license and is carrying a knife. The NSW Fraud Squad investigate a young male who has been using stolen credit cards.
119	20	TBA	10 September 2013
Some officers investigate a drug lab with firearms at a property in Meadow Heights. Police are called to the scene of a crash at a busy intersection.
120	21	TBA	17 September 2013
At the end of a four-month operation officers are getting ready to arrest two POI's who they think are the ringleaders of a syndicate trafficking more than $1 million worth of illegal abalone.

=== Season 10 ===
No. overall	No. in season	Title	Original release date
121	1	TBA	16 July 2014
Bankstown detectives take down a drug syndicate which is dealing methylamphetamine. Also, officers respond to an incident where a driver has hit a handful of cars while driving along a narrow street.
122	2	TBA	23 July 2014
A real estate agency in Western Australia is the victim of a 'cyber attack'. A couple of properties are linked to a suspected drug deal.
123	3	TBA	28 July 2014
Some police officers get more than they bargained for after they stop a car for speeding. A woman is caught using counterfeit money at a Hungry Jack's.
124	4	TBA	6 August 2014
Officers attempt to find the owner growing a marijuana crop in their lounge and also investigate a robbery where a pizza delivery driver is held at knife point.
125	5	TBA	13 August 2014
A daring inner city raid is carried out. Two men attempted to rob a young man at knifepoint but are interrupted in the act.
126	6	TBA	20 August 2014
...
127	7	TBA	27 August 2014
Detectives attempt to bring down a major drug syndicate in Fairfield. Police show up at a party in Kelmscott that has turned ugly.
128	8	TBA	3 September 2014
Officers are on the trail of a man who thought to have an unregistered gun and has made threats toward his former partner.
129	9	TBA	10 September 2014
Officers take a look around a young man's home look trying ti find a semi-automatic handgun that they believe he is trying to sell. In Arnhem Land, officers discover that Cannabis, kava and alcohol is being sold in communities for huge amounts of money.
130	10	TBA	17 September 2014
Police are on the trail of a serial armed robber that has caused havoc at service stations in recent weeks.
131	11	TBA	24 September 2014
Officers discover a group of youths hosting what could be best described as a nightclub for juveniles.
132	12	TBA	1 October 2014
133	13	TBA	8 October 2014
Officers see a familiar face in King's Cross who is up to no good. A group who are suspected of selling stolen goods are caught.
134	14	TBA	15 October 2014
Officers execute a warrant on a mortgage broker suspected of supplying fraudulent home loans. Police suspect homeowners are engaged in the illegal manufacture of methamphetamine.
135	15	TBA	22 October 2014
The Intelligence unit find out that a mother and son are operating as drug dealers in the local area.
136	16	TBA	29 October 2014
Police are shocked by what they find as they visit the home of a suspected drug dealer. A special CIB team raid two properties to reduce the Adelaide cannabis trade.
137	17	"Episode 17"	TBA
138	18	"Episode 18"	TBA
139	19	"Episode 19"	TBA
140	20	"Episode 20"	TBA

=== Season 11 ===
No. overall	No. in season	Title	Original release date	Australian viewers
141	1	"Episode 1"	12 August 2015	710,000
Members from the sexual crime squad serve a warrant on a man accused of procuring a woman and her 13-year old daughter for sex.
142	2	"Episode 2"	19 August 2015	850,000
Bankstown detectives take down a drug syndicate which is dealing methylamphetamine. Also, officers respond to an incident where a driver has hit a handful of cars while driving along a narrow street.
143	3	"Episode 3"	26 August 2015	792,000
We follow an undercover police squad, invisible to drug users and dealers. Also, detectives hunt two people using stolen credit cards and find some methamphetamine in the process.
144	4	"Episode 4"	2 September 2015	778,000
An armed robbery occurs at a jewellery store. Also, police respond to a car accident. Upon arrival they find one of the cars has landed on its roof and is lying in the front yard driveway of a house.
145	5	"Episode 5"	9 September 2015	823,000
146	6	"Episode 6"	7 October 2015	792,000
Police in the NSW Snowy Mountains conduct a Skidoo Enforcement Operation targeting speed and RBT. They receive information that a green skidoo is out of bounds and conduct a search for it.
147	7	"Episode 07"	TBA	TBD
148	8	"Episode 08"	TBA	TBD
149	9	"Episode 09"	TBA	TBD
150	10	"Episode 10"	TBA	TBD
151	11	"Episode 11"	TBA	TBD
152	12	"Episode 12"	TBA	TBD
153	13	"Episode 13"	TBA	TBD
154	14	"Episode 14"	TBA	TBD

=== Season 12 (2016) ===
No. overall	No. in season	Title	Original release date	Australian viewers
155	1	"Episode 1"	27 July 2016	N/A
156	2	"Episode 2"	31 July 2016	N/A
157	3	"Episode 3"	3 August 2016	N/A
158	4	"Episode 4"	2016	TBD
159	5	"Episode 5"	2016	TBD
160	6	"Episode 6"	TBA	TBD

=== Season 13 (2017) ===
No. overall	No. in season	Title	Original release date	Australian viewers
161	1	"Episode 1"	7 June 2017	N/A
In Gunderworld, a drug smuggling syndicate has been arming organised crime gangs in Sydney with overseas weapons. Police raid the house of a suspected drug dealer in Victoria.
162	2	"Episode 2"	14 June 2017	636,000
163	3	"Episode 3"	28 June 2017	N/A
Operation Permute targets large scale cannabis cultivation activities of a number of Vietnamese immigrants in Melbourne. A P plater is detected speeding at 146 km/h in a 100 km zone.
164	4	"Episode 4"	5 July 2017	N/A
Police search for two men wanted over a robbery at a busy road house. Also, Green Valley police move in on a suspected drug dealer's house, where they hope to find ice and other drugs.
165	5	"Episode 5"	2017	TBD
Plain-clothes officers trail a suspected drug dealer to a notorious park, while the Daly River Police set up a crocodile trap.
166	6	"Episode 6"	2017	TBD
Officers rescue a malnourished dog that has been left alone in the house for weeks, while two women are caught on CCTV abandoning a stolen car.
167	7	"Episode 7"	2017	TBD
The cops hunt for a felon who has skipped bail. Meanwhile, there's a burglary at a gated retirement village, and a group of fraudsters are busted during a house search.
168	8	"Episode 8"	2017	TBD
A violent armed robbery takes place at a jewellery store, and the police are on hand to perform first aid on the wounded shop owner. Then, there's a hunt for the robber.
169	9	"Episode 9"	2017	TBD
Police race to the scene when they get reports of a knife attack in a bakery. Meanwhile, a woman has to be cut out of her car after a nasty accident.
170	10	"Episode 10"	2017	TBD
Detectives investigate an aggravated robbery and abduction. Meanwhile, a police drug dog is used to catch out drivers on a rural road.
171	11	"Episode 11"	2017	TBD
Officers hunt for a drug kingpin and his runners, while drunk men threaten a member of the public while brandishing a weapon.
172	12	"Episode 12"	2017	TBD
Officers carry out raids in a small community as they hunt local drug dealers, while another team heads out to an accident hot spot to catch drivers using their phones.
173	13	"Episode 13"	2017	TBD
Officers raid a large drug operation in Katoomba, while plainclothes police embark on a high-speed chase and there is a hunt for a felon on the run.
174	14	"Episode 14"	2017	TBD
Officers stop a car whose driver has an interesting excuse for the weapons found in his vehicle, while a high-speed chase ensues when a driver flees after being pulled over.

=== Season 14 (2018, 2019 & 2020) ===
No. overall	No. in season	Title	Original release date	Australian viewers
175	1	"Episode 1"	31 July 2018	Not in Top 20
A 39 year old single mum of four children is arrested for defrauding over 2 million dollars from four victims through online and phone romance scams.
176	2	"Episode 2"	28 August 2018	455,000
After a four month investigation into drug supply around the Goulburn area. Operation Coull is in its arrest phase. Elsewhere police are doing speed checks when they detect a P-plater doing 125 km in an 80 km zone.
177	3	"Episode 3"	3 July 2019	420,000
Officers from Mid North Coast LAC have their eye on three men who they believe are cultivating cannabis amongst the beautiful Comara State Forest.
178	4	"Episode 4"	17 July 2019	481,000
Police setup a sting operation to arrest man dealing a dangerous new party drug.
179	5	"Episode 5"	17 September 2019	449,000
Police go on a dangerous mission to arrest a dug-dealer. Plus, Officers go after a fraudster who has purchased $23,000 worth of household items from IKEA using dud cheques.
180	6	"Episode 6"	19 May 2020	Not in Top 20
A man on parole from prison is back in business in the drug trade.

== Reception ==
=== Ratings ===
Seven Network promotions for The Force advertised the program's high premiere ratings.

Ratings trend for The Force

The premiere of The Force was popular with Australian viewers, receiving 2.295 million viewers in metropolitan areas, making it highest rating Australian premiere in 2006. The premiere was the second highest rating program of the week behind Border Security (2.298 million), although The Force outrated Border Security in both Sydney, New South Wales and Perth, Western Australia. The program rated particularly high in Perth due to the program's focus on Western Australian crimes, and a local marketing campaign which emphasised this fact.

Commenting on the program's top ratings, Tim Worner, director of programming and production at the Seven Network, said The Force had surpassed expectation and described the program as one of Seven's "hit shows". The second episode maintained the program's high ratings, achieving an audience of 1.956 million viewers.

The Force experienced a significant drop in numbers following its move to Wednesday night. Critics blamed the lack of lead-in from Border Security and tough competition from Network Ten's Thank God You're Here for the lower ratings. The first series averaged 1.453 million viewers across metropolitan markets, making it the 19th most watched regular program in 2006.

=== Critical reviews ===
Television critic Robin Oliver (The Sydney Morning Herald) claimed that The Force "achieves some of the best reality television of its kind. There is no sense of playing to cameras and it has an element of surprise that catches both officers and camera crews wrong-footed." Oliver did criticise the show, however, of being "too fast... jumping from one story to another in irritatingly quick succession."

Graeme Blundell (The Australian) noted the tabloid nature of the program, and that "issues are rarely explored beyond the simple events in the frame." He continued that despite being "sophisticated TV", The Force often felt like "a corporate training film for clean-cut police units in the WA police force."
