= AFP (TV series) =

2011–2012 Australian television show investigating the AFP

- AFP Title Screen (Source: Nine Network)
- Genre: Factual
- Narrated by: Jennifer Byrne
- Country of origin: Australia
- Original language: English
- No. of seasons: 2
- No. of episodes: 16

Production
- Executive producers: Anita Jacoby; Andrew Denton
- Producer: Zapruder’s Other Films
- Production location: Australia/International
- Running time: 22 minutes

Original release
- Network: Nine Network
- Release: 26 April 2011 – 11 November 2012

AFP is an Australian factual television show that looks at the everyday workings of the Australian Federal Police. It follows AFP investigations and operations in people smuggling, counter terrorism, bomb disposal, international drug syndicates, child sex exploitation and disaster victim identification.

All staff and crew who have worked on the show have been given top secret security clearance.

In 2013, the show was transmitted in the UK on Quest under the title Australia's Toughest Cops.

== Episodes ==
=== Season 1 (2011) ===
No.	Title	Original release date
1	"People Smuggling & Advanced Warrant Team."	April 26, 2011
Federal Agent Leisa James assists the Indonesian National Police in tracking down a boat that has been launched off the coast of Indonesia. The AFP suspects it will be used to send a boatload of asylum seekers to Australia. Meanwhile, on the streets of Sydney, Federal Agent Kevin Mulroney is about to be put through the hardest test of his career. Having just completed Advanced Warrant Training, he will now be driving the lead car in his first high risk arrest of a potentially armed and dangerous suspect.
2	"Parcel Post & Currency Dogs."	May 3, 2011
An Australian Federal Police Parcel Post team has been alerted to a box of children's lollies with a deadly surprise. When a second box is detected by Customs and Border Protection officers, the stakes rise and Federal Agent Matt Murray must quickly try to uncover and disrupt the syndicate behind this operation. Also, the AFP unveils a new weapon in the fight against crime - currency detector dogs. Dog handler Jarrod Cook takes two new dogs through the AFP's first ever currency dog detector test. Do either Labradors have what it takes to become fully operational currency dogs?
3	"International Deployment Group."	May 10, 2011
Two agents undertake pre-deployment training in Australia before they go to the Solomon Islands as part of the Regional Assistance Mission (RAMSI). But they are about to find out the island chain is an explosive mixture of ethnic tension and the local football grand final may just provide the spark for a boil over into riots.
4	"Specialist Response Amphetamine Type Stimulants Team (SRATS) / Timor-Leste"	May 17, 2011
AFP investigators have received a tip off that there is an illegal drug laboratory hidden in the suburbs of Sydney. If they are right they could be dealing with a house that could literally explode, putting hundreds of lives at risk. Also, Federal Agent Morag McGowan has spent more than a year trying to help rebuild the world's youngest country, Timor-Leste. Before leaving the troubled nation, she has to say goodbye to a group of orphans who have become her extended family. She has no idea what sort of surprise they have in store for her.
5	"Close Personal Protection"	May 24, 2011
Federal Agent Joshua Walsh aspires to be part of the Close Personal Protection (CPP) team. The CPP team is responsible for protecting dignitaries including the Prime Minister of Australia. Walsh has made it through to the final week of the training course, but the trainers are about to turn up the heat. Will he make the grade?
6	"Unexploded Ordnance UXO / Intellectual Property Crime (Operation Curia)"	May 31, 2011
The Battle of the Guadalcanal in the Solomon Islands was one of the defining clashes of the Second World War. Sixty years later, the explosives used in the epic battle are still killing people. In this episode of AFP, Federal Agent Dennis Sweeney and his local team continue the dangerous task of cleaning up the thousands of pieces of ordnance that litter the island. Meanwhile, two Sydney men have been making thousands of dollars selling fraudulent pay television cards. Federal Agent Tim Underhill has picked up the signal and now he is on a mission to shut down their operation.

=== Season 2 (2012) ===
No.	Title	Original release date
1	"Operation Alpan"	October 4, 2012
After a high-risk surveillance operation, the AFP intercepts a record 80 kilos of methamphetamine originating from China before it reaches the streets of Adelaide.
2	"Operation Glatton"	October 4, 2012
Operation Glatton, in which the Australian Federal Police uncover an international child exploitation syndicate in Manila, with the help of the Philippines police, and free a young Filipino girl from danger.
3	"Operation Alliance"	October 11, 2012
Ten years on, the untold story of the hunt for the Bali bombers and the single, tiny clue that led the AFP to a breakthrough and the terrorist mastermind himself.
4	"Operation Cyrene"	October 11, 2012
Columbia is the frontline on the AFP's war on cocaine. An Australian man attempts to internally smuggle cocaine from Colombia to Australia, but the AFP and Colombian police are following his every move.
5	"Operation Adduce"	October 18, 2012
A multi-million dollar money laundering operation in Sydney is busted by the AFP.
6	"Operation Kokoda"	October 18, 2012
August 2009, 13 passengers and crew lost their lives in the mountains of Papua New Guinea when a light plane crashed. This is the story of how the AFP DVI team identify and return all the victims to their grieving families.
7	"Operation Malkoha"	October 25, 2012
Working with US police, and against the clock, the AFP bust a cocaine smuggling operation from Mexico.
8	"Operation Glatton 2/Operation Dundas"	October 25, 2012
In Operation Glatton, a man is arrested in Australia over child exploitation material. In Operation Dundas, a woman who is the mastermind behind a syndicate creating false passports and sending them back to the Middle East is being hunted.
9	"Operation Loment"	November 1, 2012
The inside story of the 2009 arrest of a member of the Bra Boys, using an airline catering company to smuggle cocaine into Australia.
10	"Operation Prometheus"	November 1, 2012
AFP officers from the High Tech Crimes unit break open a decade old case involving a Russian child exploitation syndicate and a young girl in danger somewhere in St Petersburg.

== Home media ==
=== DVD ===
DVD name	Ep #	Discs	Region 4 (Australia)	DVD Special Features
AFP Season One	6	1	7 November 2012	None
AFP Season Two	10	2	6 March 2013	None
