= Timekeeping in games =

Game mechanics

Timekeeping is relevant to many types of games, including video games, tabletop role-playing games, board games, and sports. The passage of time must be handled in a way that players find fair and easy to understand. In many games, this is done using real-time and/or turn-based timekeeping. In real-time games, time within the game passes continuously. However, in turn-based games, player turns represent a fixed duration within the game, regardless of how much time passes in the real world. Some games use combinations of real-time and turn-based timekeeping systems. Players debate the merits and flaws of these systems. There are also additional timekeeping methods, such as timelines and progress clocks.

== Real-time ==
In real-time games, time progresses continuously. This may occur at the same or different rates from the passage of time in the real world. For example, in Terraria, one day-night cycle of 24 hours in the game is equal to 24 minutes in the real world.

In a multiplayer real-time game, players perform actions simultaneously as opposed to in sequential units or turns. In competitive games, players must consider that their opponents are working against them in real time and may act at any moment. This introduces additional challenges.

Many sports, such as soccer or basketball, are almost entirely simultaneous in nature, retaining a limited notion of turns in specific instances, such as the free kick in soccer and the free throw and shot clock in basketball. In the card games Nerts and Ligretto, players must compete to discard their cards as quickly as possible and do not take turns.

== Turn-based ==
In turn-based games, game flow is partitioned into defined parts, called turns, moves, or plays. Each player is allowed a period of analysis (sometimes bounded, sometimes unbounded) before committing to a game action.

Turns may represent periods of time, such as hours, days, or years. This is common in 4X video games like the Civilization series and world-building tabletop role-playing games. For example, in Dialect, sets of turns represent eras in a society's development; similarly, in The Quiet Year, each turn represents one week leading up to a community's destruction. This is also common in both video games and tabletop games with dating sim elements. For example, in Persona 5 and Monster Prom, turns represent high school class periods, and in Visigoths vs. Mall Goths, each team's turn represents a specific hour at the mall.

Turn-based games come in two main forms: simultaneous or sequential (also called player-alternated). Diplomacy is an example of a simultaneous turn-based game. There are three types of player-alternated games: ranked, round-robin start, and random. The difference is the order in which players start a turn. In ranked player-alternated games, the first player is the same every time. In round-robin games, the first player selection policy is round-robin. Random player-alternated games randomly select the first player. Some games also decide the order of play using an initiative score based on players' attributes, positions within the game, or dice rolls. Dungeons & Dragons and Wizard101 are examples of this style.

The term turn-based gaming is also used for play-by-mail games and browser-based gaming websites that allow long-term gameplay of board games such as Go and chess.

== Sub-types and combinations ==
Various adaptations of the real-time and turn-based systems have been implemented to address common or perceived shortcomings of these systems (though they often introduce new issues that did not exist before). These include:

=== Timed turns and time compression ===
Timed turns are designed to prevent one player from using more time to complete turns than another. In chess, for instance, a pair of stop clocks may be used in order to place an upper limit on turn length.

In exchange chess, four players on two teams play on two boards with each team taking one white and one black side. A taken piece can be given to a teammate and placed on their board. A player can abuse this game mechanic by taking an opponent's piece, giving it to a teammate, then waiting unusually long to play a turn on their own board—thereby allowing the teammate to use the advantage for many future moves on their board. To avoid this, players are often limited to ten seconds per move—with their opponent being allowed to remove one of the player's pawns from the board for each additional ten seconds consumed.

The turn-based strategy game Utopia (1982) featured an early example of timed turns. The early Ultima role-playing video games were strictly turn-based, but starting with Ultima III: Exodus (1983), if the player waited too long to issue a command, the game would issue a "pass" command automatically, thereby allowing enemies to take their turns while the player character did nothing.

Time compression is a feature commonly found in real-time games such as flight simulators. It allows the player to speed up the game time by some (usually adjustable) factor. This permits the player to shorten the subjective duration of long and relatively uneventful periods of gameplay.

=== Ticks ===
Many browser-based MMORPGs allocate a number of turns that can be played within a certain period of time, called a tick. A tick can be any measurement of real time. Players are allocated a certain number of turns per tick, which are refreshed at the beginning of each new tick. Tick-based games differ from other turn-based games in that ticks always occur after the same amount of time has expired.

=== Rounds ===
In some real-time games, game actions are timed according to a common interval that is longer than the duration of play in the real world. For instance, non-player characters might only begin actions at the beginning or end of a round. Some video games such as the Baldur's Gate series use a rounds system based on tabletop role-playing games such as Dungeons & Dragons. Fighting games use a limited number of rounds to determine the winner (usually best of three). These include Tekken, Street Fighter, and Super Smash Bros.

=== Active Time Battle ===
The "Active Time Battle" (ATB) system was introduced by Hiroyuki Ito in Final Fantasy IV (1991). ATB combines menu-based combat with a continuous flow of actions and variable wait times. Enemies can attack or be attacked at any time. The ATB system was further developed in Final Fantasy V (1992), which introducing a time gauge showing which character's turn is next. The ATB system has since been used in VI (1994), VII (1997), VIII (1999), IX (2000), and X-2 (2003). Both Final Fantasy XII (2006) and XIII (2009) used heavily modified versions of the system. The ATB system was also used in Chrono Trigger (1995).

=== Simultaneously executed and clock-based turns ===
In simultaneously executed games (also called "phase-based", "We-Go" or "Turn-based WeGo"), turns are separated into two distinct phases: decision and execution. In the decision phase, each player simultaneously plans and determines their units' actions. In the execution phase, all players' chosen actions occur automatically and at the same time. One early example is the 1959 board game Diplomacy. Video game examples include Laser Squad Nemesis (2003), the Combat Mission series, Master of Orion series, Star Hammer: The Vanguard Prophecy (2015) and Battlestar Galactica Deadlock (2017).

Clock-based games tie all unit actions directly to the game clock. Turns begin and end depending on the duration specified for each action, resulting in a sequence of turns that is highly variable and has no set order. It is also possible for different players' actions to occur at the same time with respect to the game clock, as in real-time or simultaneously executed games. Examples of video games that use a clock-based system include Typhoon of Steel (1988) and MechForce (1991), both originally for the Amiga.

=== Unit initiative ===
In some games, the sequence of turns depends on the initiative statistic of each unit, no matter which side the unit belongs to. Games of this type are still technically sequential, as only one unit can perform an action at a time, and the duration of actions is not tied to the game clock. Examples include the video games The Temple of Elemental Evil (2003) and Final Fantasy Tactics (1997).

=== Interrupting a turn ===
Some games allow players to act outside of their normal turn by interrupting an opponent's turn and executing additional actions. The number and type of actions a player may take during an interrupt sequence is limited by the number of points remaining in the player's action point pool carried over from the previous turn. Examples include the X-COM series of video games, the board wargame Advanced Squad Leader (1985), and attacks of opportunity in Dungeons & Dragons. Newer editions of Dungeons & Dragons also allow a Ready-action to prepare an action to be executed during the enemy's turn. This is also implemented in some video games, such as Solasta: Crown of the Magister (2020).

The Silent Storm video game series includes an "Interrupt" statistic for each character, to determine the likelihood of out-of-turn action. In the video game M.A.X. (1996), defensive units may be set to fire out of turn instead of on their own turn. In the board game Tide of Iron, a special card interrupts an opponent's turn to perform an action. In the Mario & Luigi series, the player often has the opportunity to "counterattack" on the enemy's turn, causing damage and often halting the attack.

=== Special turns and phases ===
In some turn-based games, not all turns are alike. The board game Imperium Romanum II (1985), for instance, features a "Taxation and Mobilization" phase in every third turn (month), which does not occur in the other turns. In the video game King Arthur: The Role-Playing Wargame (2009), every fourth turn, the season turns to winter, the only time when buildings can be constructed. In the board game Napoleon (1974), every third player turn is a "night turn" when combat is not allowed.

Other turn-based games feature several phases dedicated to different types of activities within each turn. In the Battle Isle series of video games, players issue movement orders for all units in one phase, and attack orders in a later phase. In the board game Agricola (2007), turns are divided into three phases: "Upkeep", "Replenishing" and "Work." A fourth "Harvest" phase occurs every few turns.

=== Partially or optionally turn-based and real-time ===
Some games that are generally real-time use turn-based play during specific sequences. For example, the role-playing video games Fallout (1997), Silent Storm (2003) and Baldur's Gate 3 (2023) are turn-based during the combat phase and real-time throughout the remainder of the game. This speeds up portions of the game where the careful timing of actions is not crucial to player success, such as exploration.

Other video games, such as the Total War series, X-COM (1994) and Jagged Alliance 2 (1999), combine a turn-based strategic layer with real-time tactical combat or vice versa.

The video games X-COM: Apocalypse (1997), Fallout Tactics (2001) Arcanum: Of Steamworks and Magick Obscura (2001), Pillars of Eternity II: Deadfire (2018), Pathfinder: Kingmaker (2018, added later per patch) and Pathfinder: Wrath of the Righteous (2021) offer the option of turn-based or real-time mode via a configuration setting.

The 2024 JRPG Like a Dragon: Infinite Wealth gives the character of Kazuma Kiryu the ability to temporarily perform real-time combat after filling a "Hype Meter," similar to the brawler gameplay from previous Like a Dragon titles.

=== Pausable real-time ===
In real-time games with an active pause system (also called "pausable real-time" or "real-time with pause"), players can pause the game and issue orders. When the game is un-paused, the orders automatically execute. This offers additional tactical options, such as letting players issue orders to multiple units at the same time.

The Baldur's Gate series popularized pausable real-time for mouse-driven party-based computer role-playing games, although the mechanic was also present in earlier games such as in Knights of Xentar (1991), Darklands (1992), Tales of Phantasia (1995), Total Annihilation (1997) and Homeworld (1999). In Baldur's Gate, players may also let the artificial intelligence take control during combat and press the spacebar at any time to regain control of their characters. Further, in Baldur's Gate, players are able to configure the game to automatically pause when certain conditions are met, such as at the end of a round or upon the death of a non-player character. A variation of active pause, called "Smart Pause Mode" or SPM, is a feature of Apeiron's Brigade E5: New Jagged Union (2006) and 7.62: High Calibre (2007).

The grand strategy games developed by Paradox Interactive exclusively use pausable real-time. It was the originally intended mode of the Civilization series before the developers decided to switch to turn-based. It has been present in the SimCity construction and management simulation series since SimCity (1989) and is also used in the Transport Tycoon and RollerCoaster Tycoon series.

In the single-character console RPGs Parasite Eve (1998) and Vagrant Story (2000), the player can pause the game to take aim with a weapon. In Vagrant Story, this allows players to target specific body parts while the game is paused. A similar mechanic was later used in the real-time role-playing game Last Rebellion (2010). Jagged Alliance 2 (1999) and Fallout (1997) allow players to target individual body parts during turn-based combat. The latter led to the creation of the V.A.T.S system in the real-time RPG Fallout 3, where players could pause the game to target individual body parts. Final Fantasy XII (2006) expanded on active pause combat with its "gambits" system, which allows players to collect and apply preferences to the artificial intelligence routines of partner characters, who then perform certain actions in response to certain conditions. A similar "tactics" system later appeared in Dragon Age: Origins (2009) and Dragon Age II (2011). Knights of Xentar (1991) and Secret of Mana (1993) also allow an adjustable artificial intelligence to take control during combat.

== Timelines ==
Some games use a timeline as part of a game mechanic that lets players establish or alter the order of events within the game world. For example, in the indie role-playing game Microscope, players invent a timeline together, then select different segments of the timeline to embellish through roleplaying. In the card game Chrononauts, everyone plays timeline cards to change the order of historical events, creating an alternate history.

== Progress clocks ==
A progress clock is a tabletop role-playing gamemaster (GM) tool for keeping track of ongoing events that cannot be handled within a single turn, such as the player characters' continuous headway toward defeating a challenge, the gradual approach of an enemy, or a time-limited window of opportunity. The GM draws a segmented circle to represent a clock face, then fills in a segment whenever progress develops toward the outcome. Progress clocks are important in the heist film-inspired game Blades in the Dark and other games that adapt its Forged in the Dark system.

== Reception and debate ==
Debates occur between fans of real-time and turn-based video games based on the merits and flaws of each timekeeping style.

Arguments made in favor of turn-based systems include:

- The extra time available to players in turn-based systems allows them to plan their moves to a greater degree, and permits game designers to offer additional tactical and gameplay options. The same options when used in combination with the time-pressures of real-time games, on the other hand, can cause new players to feel overwhelmed.
- Games are fairer due to a lack of reliance upon player reflexes. A player with slower reflexes is not at a disadvantage compared to faster players; rather, only the ability to think through and solve the current problem is important.
- Games can have better artificial intelligence due to the greater amount of computer processing power available to them.
- It is more realistic to control multiple units intelligently using this system, as players do not have to divide their attention among multiple independent units all moving simultaneously. Likewise, it is easier to keep track of what the enemy is doing at all times since the player is typically informed of every move in advance (not taking into account fog of war).

Arguments made in favor of real-time systems include:

- Armies pausing mid-combat to take turns and act in a sequential manner is unrealistic. Real-life combat occurs simultaneously with no side pausing to let the other side move.
- Thinking and acting quickly are part of the strategy, providing additional challenge.
- Real-time systems are viscerally exciting and add to players' sense of immersion. Players feel more like they are experiencing game events first-hand.
- Turn-based games have too many rules and are difficult to master.
- Real-time games are more multiplayer-friendly, since sitting around and waiting while other players take their turns can become tiresome.
- The added element of a shared clock prevents gameplay from becoming an easily repeatable series of steps. The reliance upon player timing makes outcomes highly variable.

== See also ==
- Game mechanics and Gameplay
- Game design and Video game design
- Play-by-mail game and List of play-by-mail games
- Sequential game
- Simultaneous game
