= Racing Demon =

Racing Demon may refer to:

- Racing Demon (play), by David Hare
- Racing Demon (card game), or Nerts, a fast-paced card game
