= Spit (card game) =

Shedding two player card game

- A competitive patience
- Origin: Before 1973
- Alternative name: Slam, Speed
- Type: Shedding-type
- Players: 2
- Skills: Counting, sequencing, manual dexterity
- Age range: 8+
- Deck: Standard 52-card deck
- Playing time: 5-15 min.

Related games
- Speed

Spit is a card game of the shedding family for two players. It is a form of competitive patience. The game is played until all of a player's cards are gone. It has a close variant known as Speed.

== History ==
The game is mentioned in the 1973 book Deal Me In! The Use of Playing Cards in Learning and Teaching by Margie Golick, who was based at McGill University, Montreal. She described it as "a game that seems to be more familiar to children then to adults. It is passed from child to child, rather than from adult to child […] This is a fast game and a good one for helping a child develop quick responses. Even the day dreamers seem to pick up speed when they play Spit."

== Objective ==
The goal of Spit is to get rid of one's cards as quickly as possible. The players do not take turns; physical speed and alertness is required to play faster than the opponent. On each deal, the player who is first to go through all of their starting cards can reduce the number of cards for the next deal. By being successful for several deals, clearing all of one's cards becomes possible, and if this is carried out successfully, one wins the game.

== Setup ==
Spit is played by two players. The entire pack is split between them, and each player makes five stacks in front of themselves in a row as follows:

- Stack 1: 1 card face up
- Stack 2: 1 card face down, 1 card face up
- Stack 3: 2 cards face down, 1 card face up
- Stack 4: 3 cards face down, 1 card face up
- Stack 5: 4 cards face down, 1 card face up

There is an alternative setup where each person lays down four cards face up separately, and a stack of ten face-down cards with one face-up card on top, similar to the setup for Canfield.

The object of the game is to move all of these cards into two "spit piles" that start empty in between the two player's rows of cards. Each player's eleven remaining cards not dealt into stacks are placed face down in a pile next to the play area; these are the spit cards. Within each player's row of cards, face-up cards of the same value (the same card but a different suit) may be placed upon each other. Then, the face-down cards revealed from this are turned over. This process continues until each player's row has face-up cards of five different values.

Players must leave their stacks on the table, and only one card can be played at a time. Players may either use both or just one hand while playing Spit; however, both players need to agree on either one or both.

== Play ==
To begin, both players say "spit" (or "slam" or "speed", depending on the variation) simultaneously as each player flips over the top card from their spit cards into the centre to start the two spit piles. Then, the two players attempt to play the cards from their rows of cards into the spit piles as fast as they can; there are no turns.

Each player can play their face-up cards from their row onto either spit pile, if the previous card in that spit pile is of a consecutive value. For example, a 5 can be placed upon a 4 or a 6, but not another 5. An Ace is considered consecutive to both King and 2. When a face-up card is used, the next card under it in its stack can be turned over and then played. If a stack of the rows is empty, a player can transfer any face-up card into that space and turn over the following card. As during setup, face-up cards of the same rank may be placed on top of each other within the rows.

Once either player has depleted the cards from their row, each player tries to slap the spit pile that they think is smaller. Whoever slaps first gets the pile slapped, and the other player takes the other spit pile. (In some variants the player who plays all their cards just chooses a pile.) These cards are added to the remainder of the player's spit cards and then shuffled together and dealt into rows as done at the start of the deal. There is no set number of rounds because the first to lose all of their cards is the winner.

If the run reaches a point where both players are stuck or choose not to play a card, both players once again say "spit" simultaneously and each player turns their top spit card face up, placing it on one of the spit piles. Play then resumes as described above.

=== End of play ===
When one player starts with fifteen cards or fewer, there will only be one spit pile, and the first player to get rid of their rows doesn't take anything from the center. The opponent takes the spit pile and their tableau cards.

If the player with no spit cards in their hand is also the one who gets rid of their rows first, they win the game. If their opponent gets rid of their tableau first, the game continues.

== Comparison with Speed ==
Spit is similar to the game Speed in the sense that players attempt to get rid of all their cards first, and is sometimes known by that name.

Speed requires 4 stacks, two having five or ten. If there are five cards in the outer stacks in the middle each player is dealt twenty cards, while if there are fifteen cards, ten are dealt. Speed permits players to use Jokers as wild cards, where in Spit, the Jokers are commonly (but not always) removed from the deck.

When playing Speed, while slapping the final pile, players have the option of shouting the word “Speed” as they slap the deck. This rule can be carried over to Spit, however it is not mandatory. The difference between Spit and Speed is in the arrangement of the stock piles. In Spit, each player has a row of piles, usually five, each with the top card face up. In Speed, each player has a single face down stock pile and a hand of five cards.

== See also ==
- Nerts
