= Games and applications for Windows Live Messenger =

There were various games and applications available in Windows Live Messenger that could be accessed via the conversation window by clicking the games icon and challenging a "buddy".

== Games ==
=== Tic-Tac-Toe ===
Tic-Tac-Toe is a game where the player places a letter (either an X or an O) on part of the board, which consists of a 3×3 grid. The aim of the game is to complete 3 squares in a row, either vertically, horizontally, or diagonally.

=== Solitaire Showdown ===
This game, included since MSN Messenger version 6, is based on the Solitaire game that is part of Windows. It is online, 2 player, and features 2 decks (a triple deck, and a special 13-card pile). Each player must race to remove cards of the special 13-card pile, and put their cards on the shared piles/suit stacks (e.g. putting an ace of any suit on the pile, but putting 2's of a suit may only be possible after the ace of the suit is currently on the pile, not covered by any other cards). There are eight different suit stacks possible. Other differences between this and normal Solitaire are that not just Kings, but any card can be put on a blank row stack, and there are four black row stacks to put on instead of seven. The game ends if one player removes all cards of the 13-card pile, or when both players are "stuck" and cannot remove/put up any more cards, and manually end the game using the End Game button. This game is similar to the game nertz.

=== Checkers ===
A standard two-player game of checkers.

=== Bejeweled ===
A two-player game where pairs of jewels on a playfield are switched to arrange three or more in a line of the same colour therefore removing them from the game. It is played in real time and individually, with scores being compared at the end.

=== Minesweeper Flags ===
In a twist on the original game, players must now locate flags and whoever has found the most by the end wins (i.e. the first person to get 26 or more mines wins). There are 51 mines on the map. Finding a flag allows the player to continue; otherwise it becomes their opponent's turn. Players get the one-off option to "bomb" a 5×5 area if they are losing, and get all the flags in that area (hence it is possible to get more than 26 mines).

=== Other games ===
Other instant games included: 3D Tic-Tac-Toe, Jewel Quest, Mahjong Quest, Quarto, Backgammon, 7 Hand Poker, Mah Jong Tiles, All Star Bowling, Bumper Stars, Flowerz, Jigsaw Too, Cubis, Hexic, Mozaki Blocks, Sudoku Too, Uno, Worms, Tic-A-Tac Poker, BrainBattle, Reversi, Rock-Paper-Scissors, Luxor, and You-Know-It! Trivia.

A number of additional third-party games have also been built using the Messenger Activity SDK. An overview of third party activities was available on gallery.live.com before the service shut down.

== Applications ==
=== Whiteboard ===
Whiteboard opens up a program that looks like Microsoft Paint, but it is shared through two users. They can see what each other draws. This Whiteboard also supports different pages, to allow drawing across many different pages. It is not compatible with Windows Vista. See Whiteboarding. This is from Microsoft NetMeeting, This will be disabled if people disable NetMeeting in Windows Setup.

=== Application Sharing ===
Application Sharing allows two computers to share an application over the network. This is usually a smaller application, as most computers cannot handle large programs on two systems at once. This is from Microsoft NetMeeting, This will be disabled if people disable NetMeeting in Windows Setup.

=== Web browser ===
Windows Live Messenger includes an Internet Explorer-based web browser that can be started when using the Encarta robot.

=== Remote Assistance ===
Remote Assistance is a feature of Windows XP and Windows Vista which is integrated with Windows Live Messenger. It allows one person to "take control" of the other's computer (with their permission) and is intended for offering computer assistance to friends and family on other computers.
