= Stagecoach Performing Arts =

Professional part-time theatre arts school

Stagecoach Performing Arts Limited
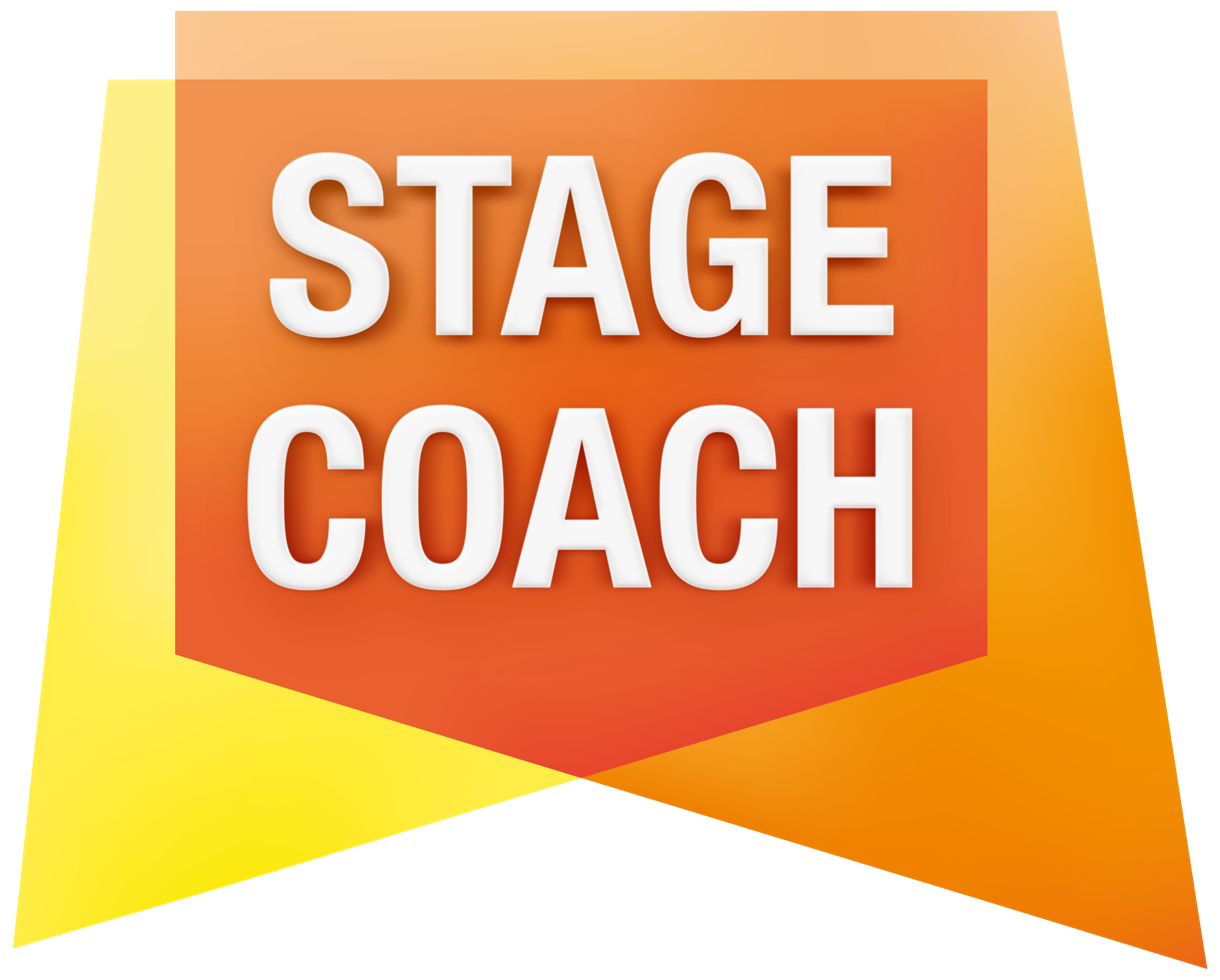
- Type: Private
- Industry: Children's Education
- Founded: 1988
- Founder: Stephanie Manuel, David Sprigg
- Headquarters: Woking, England
- Area served: Australia; Canada; Germany; Gibraltar; Malta; Spain; Lithuania; United Kingdom
- Owner: Trafalgar Entertainment
- Website: Stagecoach Performing Arts

Stagecoach Performing Arts Limited is a professional part-time performing arts school, with over 3,000 schools across eight countries. Training is offered in singing, dancing and acting.

Stagecoach Performing Arts is a franchise for part-time performing arts schools in Australia, Canada, Germany, Gibraltar, Malta, Spain, Lithuania and the UK.

== Notable alumni ==
- Kit Connor, actor
- Sebastian Croft, actor
- Jamie Bell, actor
- Meg Bellamy, actress
- Esmé Bianco, model, actress – starred in Game of Thrones and burlesque/cabaret performer
- Zoe Birkett, Pop Idol series one (2001–2002) finalist, singer and actress
- Jonny Clarke, actor who portrayed Bart McQueen in Hollyoaks
- Lorna Fitzgerald, actress who portrayed Abi Branning in EastEnders
- Tom Fletcher, lead singer and songwriter in Mcfly
- Elliot Francis, actor
- Dani Harmer, actress who starred in Tracy Beaker
- Myleene Klass, actress, singer, model, pianist, radio and television presenter
- Cher Lloyd, The X Factor (2010) finalist
- Clare Maguire, singer
- Stuart Piper, agent
- Bella Ramsey, actor
- Aaron Renfree, S Club 8 singer, actor, dancer on The Voice UK
- Sherrie Silver, choreographer
- Shannon Saunders, singer, winner of Disney Channel UK contest My Camp Rock 2
- Diana Vickers, singer, actress The X Factor (2008) finalist
- Emma Watson, actress
- Ellie Darcey-Alden, actress
- Carla Woodcock, actress who has appeared in Free Rein and Ackley Bridge
