= Little Dorrit (TV series) =

2008 British miniseries

- Cover of the BBC DVD release
- Genre: Period drama
- Based on: Little Dorrit by Charles Dickens
- Written by: Andrew Davies
- Directed by: Adam Smith (6 episodes); Dearbhla Walsh (5 episodes); Diarmuid Lawrence (3 episodes)
- Starring: Claire Foy; Matthew Macfadyen; Tom Courtenay; Judy Parfitt
- Composer: John Lunn
- Country of origin: United Kingdom
- Original language: English
- No. of series: 1
- No. of episodes: 14

Production
- Executive producers: Rebecca Eaton; Anne Pivcevic
- Producer: Lisa Osborne
- Cinematography: Lukas Strebel; Owen McPolin; Alan Almond
- Editors: Nick Arthurs; Philip Kloss; David Head
- Running time: 26 minutes
- Production companies: BBC; WGBH Boston

Original release
- Network: BBC One
- Release: 26 October – 11 December 2008

Little Dorrit is a 2008 British miniseries based on Charles Dickens's serial novel of the same title, originally published between 1855 and 1857. The screenplay is by Andrew Davies and the episodes were directed by Adam Smith, Dearbhla Walsh, and Diarmuid Lawrence.

The series was a joint production of the BBC and the American PBS member station WGBH Boston. It originally was broadcast by BBC One and BBC HD, beginning on 26 October 2008 with a 60-minute opening episode, followed by 12 half-hour episodes and a 60-minute finale. In the United States, it aired in five episodes as part of PBS's Masterpiece series between 29 March and 26 April 2009. In Australia, episodes were combined into seven-parts on ABC1 each Sunday at 8:30pm from 27 June 2010 and has since been repeated on UKTV.

The series won seven Primetime Emmy Awards, including Outstanding Miniseries.

== Plot ==
Since her birth in 1805, Amy Dorrit has lived in the Marshalsea Prison for Debt for twenty-one years, caring for her father, William, who now enjoys a position of privileged seniority as the Father of the Marshalsea. Amy works as a seamstress for Mrs. Clennam, a cranky, cold and forbidding semi-invalid living in a crumbling home with servants, the sinister Jeremiah Flintwinch and his bumbling wife, Affery.

Mr. Clennam and his son Arthur have been handling the family business in China for 15 years. On his deathbed, he asks his son "put it right" with his mother and hands Arthur a pocket watch. On his return to England, Arthur gives his mother the watch, which she opens and takes out a bit of cloth containing the words "Do not forget."

Arthur is enamoured of the beautiful Minnie (Pet) Meagles, who is also courted by aspiring artist, Henry Gowan, to her parents' distress. Arthur befriends Amy and wonders whether his mother's uncharacteristically benevolent attitude towards her indicates his family may be responsible for the Dorrits' misfortunes. John Chivery, who guards the prison with his father, has grown up alongside Amy and eventually proposed to her. She refuses which upsets both their fathers.

Amy's brother, Tip, falls into debt and joins his father in prison. Arthur pays his debt anonymously; Amy guesses, whilst Tip is ungrateful. Arthur tries to discover why Dorrit was originally confined to the Marshalsea and asks rent collector and amateur detective, Mr. Pancks, to investigate. Arthur proposes to Pet, who tells him she accepted Gowan's proposal that morning. He continues a friendship with inventor-engineer Daniel Doyce, and they become partners with Arthur running the business side.

Mrs. Clennam asks Flintwinch to destroy a box of papers she has kept for years, but he gives the box to his twin brother Ephraim instead. Ex-convict and murderer Rigaud meets Ephraim in a pub and observes how tightly he is holding onto the box. He gets Ephraim drunk, murders him, and takes the papers, which reveal a Clennam family secret.

Pancks discovers that Dorrit is heir to a fortune. Now wealthy, Dorrit leaves the Marshalsea and insists his family forget their "shameful past" and everyone connected to it, snubbing and insulting Arthur. He hires Mrs Hortensia General to educate his daughters and prepare them for society. They all depart on a Grand Tour of Europe, but Amy cannot adapt to the new lifestyle. Amy's sister, Fanny, is courted by Edmund Sparkler, step-son of wealthy financier, Mr. Merdle. At Pancks' suggestion, Arthur invests the Doyce & Clennam funds in Merdle's bank.

Dorrit returns to England and asks Merdle for advice on "prudent investment". Merdle agrees to invest Dorrit's fortune as a family favour. Still tormented by prison memories and losing touch with reality, Dorrit returns to Italy to propose to Mrs General. She interrupts his impetuous proposal but implies future acceptance. At an elegant ball held by Mrs. Merdle, who is also in Italy, Dorrit addresses the attendees as "the Father of the Marshalsea" and completely reverts to his former role. Amy and Dorrit's brother Frederick escort him back to their rooms, where he persists in his delusion and dies. Mrs. General has departed, and Frederick is found dead at his brother's side the next morning.

Amy returns to London, where she is accommodated by Fanny, who has married Sparkler, largely to spite his mother Mrs. Merdle. While Merdle has been regarded as a financial genius and "the man of the age," his suicide reveals that his bank is a Ponzi scheme. Thousands are ruined, including Arthur, who chooses to enter the Marshalsea rather than flee the country. After showing him to Dorrit's old room, John Chivery angrily reveals to Arthur that Amy loves him. A despondent Arthur is shocked to receive a visit from Rigaud, who tells him "I know all about you," and could destroy the Clennam family business. After Rigaud's departure, Arthur becomes ill with a dangerous fever. He wakens from his delirium to find he is being nursed by Amy. She offers to pay his debts out of her inheritance, but he refuses.

Rigaud returns to Mrs. Clennam and reveals what he learned from the documents. Her cruel attitude drove her husband to infidelity, which resulted in the birth of Arthur, whom Mrs. Clennam raised as her own, with no motherly feeling. When Arthur's birth mother died, his paternal grandfather bequeathed money to Amy, who was born in the Marshalsea the day Arthur's birth mother died. Rigaud demands £2,000 to keep silent, but Mrs. Clennam rises from her wheelchair and leaves her house for the first time in years, stumbling to the Marshalsea. She finds Amy, reveals the truth, and begs forgiveness. As she returns to her dilapidated house with Amy's assistance, the building collapses, killing Rigaud. Mrs. Clennam falls to the ground and dies, while Flintwinch emerges from the ruins and runs away.

The Dorrits learn that all their money was invested with Merdle and is lost. Now that Amy is penniless, Arthur accepts her, and they declare their mutual love. Daniel Doyce returns from Russia, where he has made a fortune. Instead of being angry with Arthur for losing the company's funds, he tells him that his success keeps the company going and makes Arthur rich. Surrounded by their friends, Arthur and Amy are married.

== Cast ==
- Claire Foy as Amy Dorrit "Little Dorrit"
- Matthew Macfadyen as Arthur Clennam
- Judy Parfitt as Mrs. Clennam
- Tom Courtenay as William Dorrit
- Andy Serkis as Rigaud / Blandois
- Eddie Marsan as Mr. Pancks
- Emma Pierson as Fanny Dorrit
- James Fleet as Frederick Dorrit
- Arthur Darvill as Edward "Tip" Dorrit
- Anton Lesser as Mr. Merdle
- Amanda Redman as Mrs. Merdle
- Sebastian Armesto as Edmund Sparkler
- Alun Armstrong as Jeremiah / Ephraim Flintwinch
- Sue Johnston as Affery Flintwinch
- Georgia King as Minnie "Pet" Meagles
- Alex Wyndham as Henry Gowan
- Bill Paterson as Mr. Meagles
- Janine Duvitski as Mrs. Meagles
- Ruth Jones as Flora Casby Finching
- John Alderton as Christopher Casby
- Annette Crosbie as Mr. F's Aunt
- Zubin Varla as Daniel Doyce
- Russell Tovey as John Chivery
- Ron Cook as Mr. Chivery
- Freema Agyeman as Tattycoram
- Maxine Peake as Miss Wade
- Harriet Walter as Mrs. Gowan
- Jason Thorpe as Jean-Baptiste Cavalletto
- Jason Watkins as Mr. Plornish
- Rosie Cavaliero as Mrs. Plornish
- Eve Myles as Maggy
- Robert Hardy as Tite Barnacle [Sr]
- Darren Boyd as Tite Barnacle Jr
- Pam Ferris as Mrs. Hortensia General
- Nicholas Jones as Mr. Merdle's butler
- Geoffrey Whitehead as Doctor
- Nicholas Blane as Lawyer
- Angus Barnett as Slingo the horsedealer
- Roy Hudd as Theatre Director
- Skye Bennett as Girl
- Ian McElhinney as Mr. Clennam, Arthur's late father
- Elliot Francis as Errand Boy

== Production ==
The series was filmed on location at Chenies Manor House, Luton Hoo, and Hellfire Caves in Buckinghamshire; Deal Castle in Kent; Hampton Court Palace as the Marshalsea; and the Old Royal Naval College in Greenwich. Interiors were filmed in the Pinewood Studios.

== Critical reception ==
On Rotten Tomatoes, 100% of 10 critics have given the series a positive review, and the consensus states, "With a sterling cast and plenty of juicy drama, Little Dorrit is a superb adaptation."

=== United Kingdom ===
In the United Kingdom, the series was often compared to Davies' Bleak House, which was released three years earlier. One reviewer for The Daily Telegraph wrote that "Some of the acting has been a bit too hammy" and blamed falling viewing figures on "confusion over scheduling, starting as an hour long special and then breaking into half an hour episodes, like a Victorian East Enders"; another added that it "doesn't seem to have caught on in the same way as other recent costume dramas such as Cranford and Bleak House", both due to scheduling and also down since "it wasn't quite as good" as these two programmes, though also that "Most of the cast were as reliably terrific". The Independent also praised the performances, especially Courtenay, Macfadyen and Peake, whilst another of its reviewers praised Davies' adaptation. The Guardian also praised the acting and the adaptation, though with the caveat that "because it's Dickens, those top names can get away with a little bit more showing off and look-at-me acting than they would be able to in, say, Jane Austen".

=== United States ===
Brian Lowry of Variety observed, "Slow going at first and rushed near the end, it's nevertheless an absorbing piece of work, reminding us that there are certain things the Brits simply do better... Davies could have easily shed (or at least pared down) a few of [the] subplots without seriously diminishing the story's grandeur, and after the lengthy windup, the last hour races through tying up the assorted loose ends. Even so, there's so much gaudy talent on display here that those with an appetite for it won't be able to get enough, and Little Dorrit gives them everything they could want in a big, gloriously messy package."

Matthew Gilbert of The Boston Globe felt the series "has so many virtues – indelible performances, stirring pathos, and an emotional and psychological heft unusual for Dickens – that you can forgive its one significant flaw... For all its feeling, Little Dorrit does not wrap up well, which is a no-no when it comes to Dickens. Indeed, a Dickens denouement needs to be neat... But the loose strings that Davies leaves dangling at the end of this script are frustrating. All the carefully built mystery implodes in the final act, as the importance of a number of characters... and the backstory itself are left murky in ways that Dickens made clear... It's hard to imagine how this happened in the course of such an otherwise mindful endeavor. And yet Little Dorrit is still rewarding, for the long journey, if not for the final stop."

Robert Lloyd of the Los Angeles Times noted, "Not every character is exactly as described on paper; some don't stay around long enough to register and others who have earned our interest just disappear. And the story can be confusing at times. But all in all, this is a dynamic, addictive rendition of a complicated novel."

Jonathan Storm of The Philadelphia Inquirer stated, "Andrew Davies, who made 2006's Bleak House one of the best TV shows of the year, crafts another superb script, with characters and incidents squeezing out the sides, just the thing to satisfy close observers, which anyone joining this maxi mini-series should be. Costumes, sets, and actors, a broad lot of those super-skilled, terrifically trained Brits, make for sumptuous viewing... You pretty much know what to expect when Masterpiece visits the 19th century. But Little Dorrit stands at the high end of a very lofty list of period-piece achievement. It's big entertainment."

In her review in The New York Times, Alessandra Stanley said the series "is as rich at the margins as at the center with strange, and strangely believable, characters from almost all levels of society, rendered in quick, firm strokes," while David Wiegand of the San Francisco Chronicle called it "terrific entertainment... in some ways, perhaps even better than its source material."

=== Awards and nominations ===
Year	Award	Category	Nominee(s)	Result	Ref.
2009	British Academy Television Craft Awards	Best Costume Design	Barbara Kidd	Nominated	
2009	British Academy Television Craft Awards	Best Make Up and Hair Design	Karen Hartley-Thomas	Nominated	
2009	British Academy Television Craft Awards	Best Original Television Music	John Lunn	Nominated	
2009	British Academy Television Craft Awards	Best Production Design	James Merifield	Nominated	
2009	British Academy Television Craft Awards	Best Sound – Fiction/Entertainment	Rudi Buckle, Colin Chapman, Ross Adams, and Richard Street	Nominated	
2009	Broadcasting Press Guild Awards	Best Drama Series		Nominated	
2009	Broadcasting Press Guild Awards	Writer's Award	Andrew Davies (Also for Sense and Sensibility)	Nominated	
2009	Irish Film & Television Awards	Best Director – Television	Dearbhla Walsh	Nominated	
2009	Irish Film & Television Awards	Director of Photography – Television	Owen McPolin	Nominated	
2009	Online Film & Television Association Awards	Best Miniseries		Nominated	
2009	Online Film & Television Association Awards	Best Actor in a Motion Picture or Miniseries	Matthew Macfadyen	Nominated	
2009	Online Film & Television Association Awards	Best Supporting Actor in a Motion Picture or Miniseries	Tom Courtenay	Nominated	
2009	Online Film & Television Association Awards	Best Supporting Actress in a Motion Picture or Miniseries	Judy Parfitt	Nominated	
2009	Online Film & Television Association Awards	Best Direction of a Motion Picture or Miniseries	Adam Smith, Dearbhla Walsh, and Diarmuid Lawrence	Nominated	
2009	Online Film & Television Association Awards	Best Writing of a Motion Picture or Miniseries	Andrew Davies	Nominated	
2009	Online Film & Television Association Awards	Best Ensemble in a Motion Picture or Miniseries		Nominated	
2009	Online Film & Television Association Awards	Best Costume Design in a Motion Picture or Miniseries		Nominated	
2009	Online Film & Television Association Awards	Best Lighting in a Motion Picture or Miniseries		Nominated	
2009	Online Film & Television Association Awards	Best Music in a Motion Picture or Miniseries		Nominated	
2009	Online Film & Television Association Awards	Best Production Design in a Motion Picture or Miniseries		Nominated	
2009	Primetime Emmy Awards	Outstanding Miniseries	Anne Pivcevic, Rebecca Eaton, and Lisa Osborne	Won	
2009	Primetime Emmy Awards	Outstanding Supporting Actor in a Miniseries or a Movie	Tom Courtenay	Nominated	
2009	Primetime Emmy Awards	Outstanding Supporting Actor in a Miniseries or a Movie	Andy Serkis	Nominated	
2009	Primetime Emmy Awards	Outstanding Directing for a Miniseries, Movie or Dramatic Special	Dearbhla Walsh (for "Part 1")	Won	
2009	Primetime Emmy Awards	Outstanding Writing for a Miniseries, Movie or Dramatic Special	Andrew Davies	Won	
2009	Primetime Creative Arts Emmy Awards	Outstanding Art Direction for a Miniseries or Movie	James Merifield, Paul Ghirardani, and Deborah Wilson	Won (Note: Tied with Kalina Ivanov, Brandt Gordon, and Norma Jean Sanders for Grey Gardens.)	
2009	Primetime Creative Arts Emmy Awards	Outstanding Casting for a Miniseries, Movie or Special	Rachel Freck	Won	
2009	Primetime Creative Arts Emmy Awards	Outstanding Cinematography for a Miniseries or Movie	Lukas Strebel (for "Part 1")	Won	
2009	Primetime Creative Arts Emmy Awards	Outstanding Costumes for a Miniseries, Movie or Special	Barbara Kidd and Marion Weise (for "Part 3")	Won	
2009	Primetime Creative Arts Emmy Awards	Outstanding Hairstyling for a Miniseries or Movie	Karen Hartley-Thomas	Nominated	
2009	Primetime Creative Arts Emmy Awards	Outstanding Music Composition for a Miniseries, Movie or Special (Original Dramatic Score)	John Lunn (for "Part 5")	Nominated	
2009	Royal Television Society Awards	Actor (Male)	Matthew Macfadyen	Nominated	
2009	Royal Television Society Awards	Actor (Female)	Claire Foy	Nominated	
2009	Royal Television Society Craft & Design Awards	Costume Design - Drama	Barbara Kidd	Nominated	
2009	Satellite Awards	Best Miniseries		Won	
2009	Satellite Awards	Best Actor in a Supporting Role in a Miniseries or Motion Picture Made for Television	Tom Courtenay	Nominated	
2009	Satellite Awards	Best Actress in a Supporting Role in a Miniseries or Motion Picture Made for Television	Judy Parfitt	Nominated	
2009	Television and Radio Industries Club Awards	TV Drama Programme		Nominated	
2009	Writers' Guild of Great Britain Awards	Television Drama Series	Andrew Davies	Nominated	
2009	Writers' Guild of Great Britain Awards	Lifetime Achievement Award	Andrew Davies	Won	
2010	Costume Designers Guild Awards	Outstanding Made for Television Movie or Miniseries	Barbara Kidd	Nominated	
2010	Golden Globe Awards	Best Miniseries or Television Film		Nominated	
2010	Producers Guild of America Awards	David L. Wolper Award for Outstanding Producer of Long-Form Television	Anne Pivcevic and Lisa Osborne	Nominated	

== See also ==
- Television in the United Kingdom
- 2008 in television
