= Ellie Darcey-Alden =

English-American actress (born 1999)

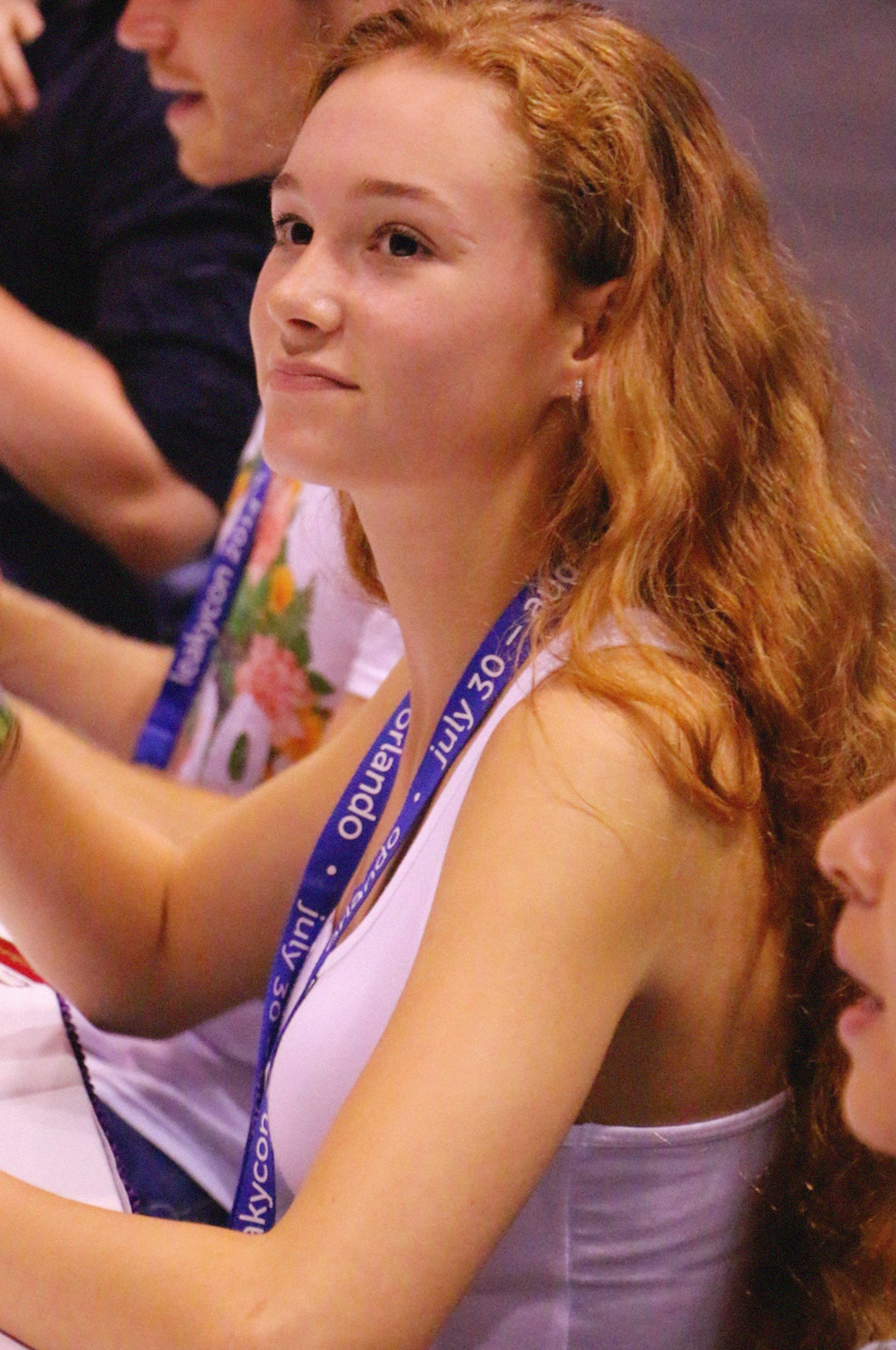
- Darcey-Alden in 2014
- Born: Ellie May Darcey-Alden; 4 September 1999 (age 27); Yarnton, Oxford, England
- Occupations: Actress, model, competitive dancer
- Years active: 2007–present

Ellie May Darcey-Alden (born 4 September 1999) is an English-American actress. She is best known for playing young Lily Potter in Harry Potter and the Deathly Hallows – Part 2 and Francesca "Franny" Latimer in the Doctor Who series 7 Christmas special "The Snowmen".

== Personal life and education ==
Darcey-Alden was born in Yarnton, Oxford to Sarah Dawn (née Darcey), a housewife, and Phillip Alden, a production senior director on Falcon 9 for SpaceX. She has a younger brother, Joseph who is a former child actor and two older half-siblings from her father's first marriage.

She is a former pupil of Dance 10 Theatre School, Kidlington which she attended from 2005 to 2011 and of Stagecoach Theatre Arts School under the instruction of Maya Sprigg in Oxford until 2013.

She moved to Los Angeles in 2013 when she was 13 years old where she attended Elite Dance Studio in Los Angeles until 2015. In late August 2014, she began attending Palos Verdes High School and graduated in 2018. In 2015 she joined her school's choreo dance team. In 2017, she joined the RADA Youth Company: Acting summer term, training under Trilby James in contemporary text and Shakespeare. and in 2018, she began youth acting classes with John Rosenfeld Studios in West Hollywood.

She is a fan of Muggle Quidditch, and was taught to play by members of the five National teams that participated in the 2012 IQA Summer Games.

She splits her time between Oxford, England and Rancho Palos Verdes, Los Angeles. In 2018, she was diagnosed for the second time with a breast mass, undergoing immediate surgery. She has since made a full recovery. She and her brother Joseph Darcy-Alden became U.S. citizens in 2022.

== Career ==
=== 2007–2009: Early work ===
Darcey-Alden made her acting debut in 2007, appearing in small roles on the British stage and television, including her first stage credit in Aladdin, directed by Peter Duncan for the Oxford Playhouse. Aged seven she forged her parents' signature on a sign-up sheet which led to an audition. After the play's run, Duncan strongly recommended that she continue acting, directing her to film agents in London where she signed on with A&J Management. This was followed by an uncredited role in the 2008 mini-series Tess of the D'Urbervilles.

In 2009, she appeared in her first guest-starring role as Mary in one episode of Robin Hood and in select episodes as Emma Walker in Holby City — both for the BBC. That year, she also appeared in Adrian Noble's musical production of Chitty Chitty Bang Bang for the New Theatre Oxford (a revamped production of the original 2002 London production) and the Mardi Gras Challenge, a UK dance competition at the Sadler's Wells Theatre.

=== 2009–2011: Harry Potter ===
Darcey-Alden's most notable role came in summer 2008 when she attended an open audition for the latest Harry Potter instalment. It was not yet decided by the producers that the final book in the series would be split into two parts and once this decision was made, Darcey-Alden was expected to "re-audition over a year later" in December 2009 and "luckily still met the height and role requirements." She was cast as the young Lily Evans, appearing in a flashback sequence as Harry's mother in her schooldays. Lily reveals how she befriended Snape as child, which is crucial in explaining the back story of the shady professor and his complex relationship to Harry's deceased parents, particularly his bitter resentment to his father James.

=== 2012 onwards ===
Darcey-Alden has since been cast in a variety of independent and larger budget films including a cameo role in Welcome to the Punch, a British thriller co-starring James McAvoy, Mark Strong and Harry Potter alum Peter Mullan. Other roles include two short films, Pranks and Sam & Isobel. Pranks co-starred her brother Joseph.

In 2012, she returned to the BBC for the Doctor Who series 7 Christmas special, "The Snowmen" as Francesca Latimer reuniting with brother Joseph as her on-screen sibling and co-starring alongside Jenna-Louise Coleman and Matt Smith. The same year she was a guest star in the second season of Tom Fontana's French-German-Czech historical television drama Borgia: Faith and Fear (not to be confused with Showtime's The Borgias) as Felice della Rovere, on-screen and illegitimate daughter to Dejan Čukić's Cardinal Giuliano della Rovere (better known as Pope Julius II).

Stage credits included Ellen Kent's Aida Verdi for the New Theatre Oxford and The Nutcracker Twisted (or A Twisted Nutcracker), an interpretation of the original which breaks away from classic ballet and includes tap, hip-hop, jazz and singing. It was presented by Elite Dance Studio and performed at the Norris Theatre in 2013.

In 2013, she performed for the Los Angeles Clippers halftime show with Elite Dance Studio. In 2014 she appeared in the Showstopper! competition at the Disneyland Hotel in California. In 2015 she appeared in the KAR: Kids Artistic Revue at Millikan High School. She also worked as a British English dialect coach for Palos Verdes High School's production of Noises Off.

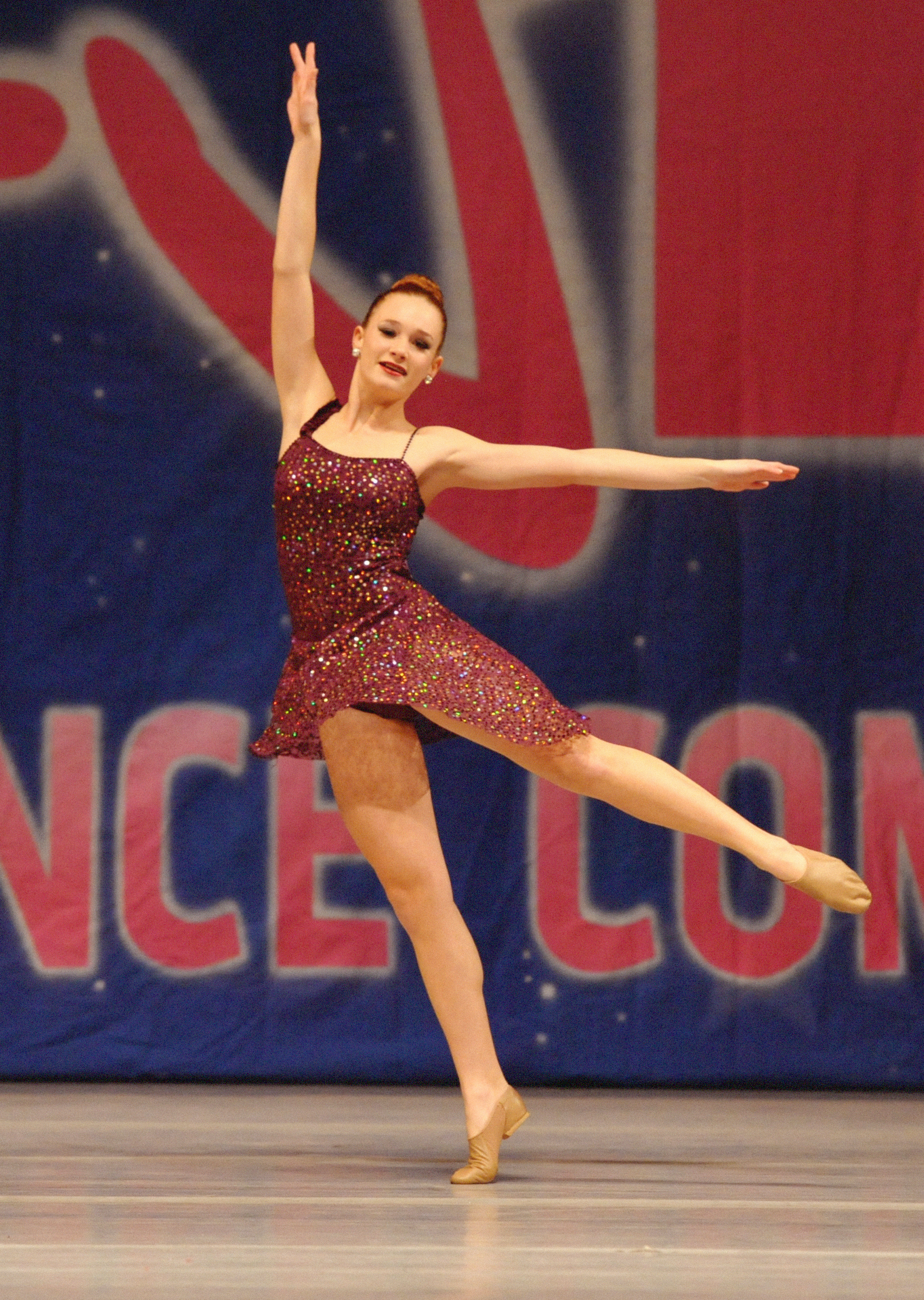
Darcey-Alden in 2015

In 2016 she was cast in Palos Verdes High School's production of Joseph and the Amazing Technicolor Dreamcoat, directed by Nicole Thompson. The musical was nominated for 15 John Raitt Awards for Youth, including best ensemble and took home one for musical comedy of the year.

In 2018, she was cast as the recurring character Alice in the British drama action television series Remnants, directed and written by Luke Heaver and Kieran Thomas Peace.

In 2019 she appeared in How to Identify a Serial Killer as the supporting character Harriett.

== Other work ==
Outside of screen and stage credits, she modelled for Morleys Stores ca. 2009–10, Playworld Systems, Nestle, Sodexo, Marks & Spencer, and McCarthy & Stone, and was a front page model for the British children and pre-teen magazine Girl Talk in 2012 and 2013. In January 2011, she appeared in a commercial for Skype.

She has appeared at many Harry Potter events and other fan conventions over the years, including the Harry Potter and the Deathly Hallows – Part 1 cast and crew screening in October 2010, the Harry Potter and the Deathly Hallows – Part 2 world premiere on 7 July 2011 in Trafalgar Square, LeakyCon 2011 in Orlando, Florida, the Warner Bros. Studio Tour London: The Making of Harry Potter in October 2012, LeakyCon Portland 2013, LeakyCon London 2013, Misti-Con 2013 in Laconia, New Hampshire. and SpaceCon, Cape Coral in 2023.

In December 2012, along with Potter alum Ryan Turner (Hugo Weasley) she participated in the Leighton Christmas Festival.

She was scheduled to appear as a guest at Gallifrey One 2014, a science fiction and Doctor Who fan convention, which took place 14–16 February at the Los Angeles Airport Marriott. It was announced that she would be returning to LeakyCon 2014, which took place in Orlando, Florida from 30 July to 3 August and played Hermione Granger in the Opening Ceremony. She and her brother Joseph appeared as guests at the Midwest's Premier Doctor Who event, Chicago TARDIS 2014 from 28 to 30 November at the Westin Lombard Yorktown Center. She and her brother were scheduled to appear as guests at the Twin Cities' premier Doctor Who convention, CONsole Room 2015 which took place from 29 to 31 May at the Hilton Minneapolis/St. Paul Airport. On 6 April 2016, she visited The Wizarding World of Harry Potter Opening at Universal Studios Hollywood on behalf of MuggleNet where she interviewed Harry Potter co-stars Tom Felton, James and Oliver Phelps, Evanna Lynch and Warwick Davis as well as art director Alan Gilmore.

== Filmography ==
=== Film and television ===
Year	Show	Role	Notes
2008	Tess of the D'Urbervilles (BBC)	Modesty Durbeyfield	Season 1, episodes 1 to 4 (uncredited)
2009	Robin Hood (BBC)	Mary	Season 3, episode 1 "Total Eclipse"
2009	Holby City (BBC)	Emma Walker	Season 12, episodes 1, 2 and 11
2011	Harry Potter and the Deathly Hallows – Part 2	Young Lily Evans	
2012	Pranks (short film)	Katie Kruek	Specifically created for the book The Craft of the Cut: The Final Cut Pro X Editor's Handbook, including a DVD of the film's rushes.
2012	Doctor Who (BBC)	Francesca "Franny" Latimer	Season 7, episode 6 "The Snowmen"
2013	Welcome to the Punch	12-Year-Old Girl	
2013	Borgia (Canal+)	Felice della Rovere	Season 2, episodes 11 and 12
2014	Sam & Isobel	Isobel	Short film
2018	The Nameless	Executive producer	
2019	Remnants	Alice	Season 1, episodes 1 to 13
2019	How to Identify a Serial Killer	Harriett	Season 1
2019	Knucks	Krysta	
2019	Unseen	Kidnapped Girl #1	
2019	Snuggle Party	Cuddler	
2020	Pool Boy Nightmare	Becca	
2023	Support Group	Emma	
2023	Children of the Cloth	Hope	
2023	The Devil's Stone	Maria	
2023	General Hospital	Cornelia	1 episode

=== Theatre ===
Year	Production	Venue	Role	Notes
2007	Aladdin	Oxford Playhouse	Street urchin/ensemble	Stage Play; Dir. Peter Duncan
2009	Chitty Chitty Bang Bang	New Theatre Oxford	Sewer child/children's ensemble	Musical; Dir. Adrian Noble; Revamped production of the original 2002 London production
2009	Mardi Gras	Sadler's Wells Theatre	Dancer	UK dance competition
2013	Aida Verdi	New Theatre Oxford	Slave girl/ensemble	Opera; Dir. Ellen Kent
2013	Charity Spectacular	New Theatre Oxford	Performer	Variety Show; Dir. Maya Sprigg; Stagecoach Theatre Arts School
2013	Spellbound Variety Show	New Theatre Oxford	Dancer	Variety Show
2013	The Nutcracker Twisted	Norris Theatre	Sugar Plum Fairy/ensemble	Musical; Elite Dance Studio
2014	Miss Dance Drill Team USA: California	Elite Dance Studio	Dancer	US dance competition
2014	KAR: Kids Artistic Revue	Centinela Valley Center for the Arts, Redondo Beach	Dancer	US dance competition Dir. Ernest Balderas
2014	Showstopper!	Disneyland Hotel	Dancer	US dance competition
2014	LeakyCon Opening Ceremony	Orange County Convention Center	Hermione Granger	Fandom conference
2015	KAR: Kids Artistic Revue	Millikan High School	Dancer	US dance competition
2015	PV Choreo Show	James R. Armstrong Theatre	Ensemble Dancer	Palos Verdes High School
2015	Noises Off	Palos Verdes High School	Dialect coach	Play; Dir. Nicole Thompson
2016	PV Choreo Show	James R. Armstrong Theatre	Ensemble dancer	Palos Verdes High School
2016	Picture This!	James R. Armstrong Theatre	Dancer	Spring choreo dance concert Palos Verdes High School
2016	Joseph and the Amazing Technicolor Dreamcoat	Palos Verdes High School	Wives/Pharaoh's Girls/Female Ensemble	Musical; Dir. Nicole Thompson
2016	LeakyCon story part 3 & closing	Marriott Burbank Airport Hotel	The Leaky Cauldron pub guest/ensemble	Fandom conference

== Awards and nominations ==
Year	Work	Award	Category	Result
2016	Joseph and the Amazing Technicolor Dreamcoat	John Raitt Award for Youth	Best Ensemble	Nominated

== Notes ==
- McCabe, Bob. Harry Potter Page to Screen: The Complete Filmmaking Journey. First Ed. New York, NY: Harper Design, 2011. Print. ISBN 978-0-062-10189-1.
- Riley, Mark, and Marios Chirtou. The Craft of the Cut: The Final Cut Pro X Editor's Handbook. West Sussex: Wiley, 2012. Print. ISBN 978-1-119-95173-5.
