= American Toad (card game) =

Card game

American Toad is a patience or card solitaire game played using two standard packs of playing cards. It is similar to Canfield except that the tableau builds down in suit, and a partial tableau stack cannot be moved, only the top card or entire stack. The object is to move all cards to the foundations.

== Rules ==
=== Layout ===
American Toad has eight tableau stacks. Each tableau stack contains one card and builds down in suit wrapping from Ace to King, e.g. 3♠, 2♠, A♠, K♠...

Eight foundations build up in suit, e.g. 7♦, 8♦, 9♦...

The game includes one reserve pile with twenty cards that can be played onto the tableau or foundations. A pack usually at the bottom right turns up one card at a time.

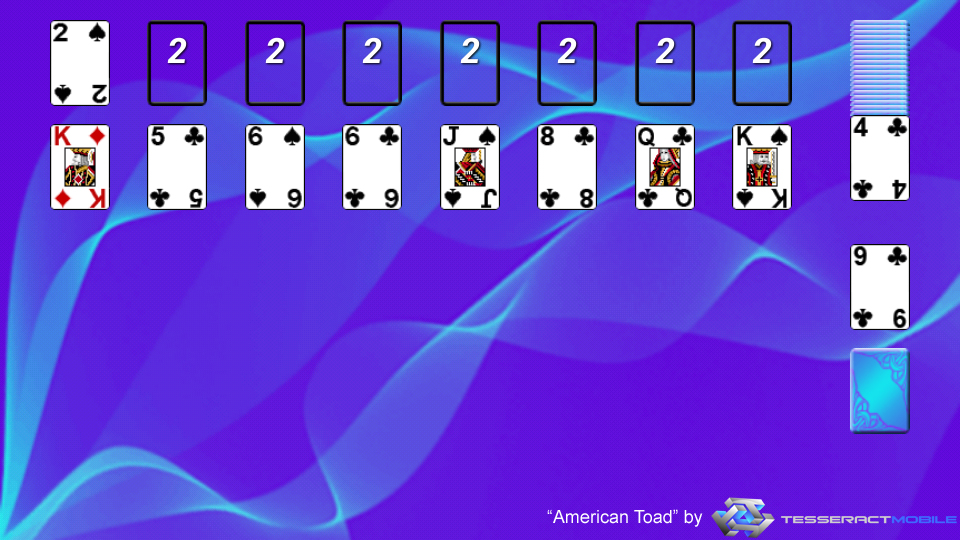
American Toad layout

=== Rules ===
One card is dealt onto the first foundation. This rank will be used as a base for the other foundations. The foundations build up in suit, wrapping from King to Ace as necessary. Cards in the tableau can be moved to a foundation or onto another tableau stack. The tableau builds down in suit wrapping from Ace to King. Empty spaces are filled automatically from the reserve. Once the reserve is empty, spaces in the tableau can be filled with a card from the pack, but NOT from another tableau pile. When moving tableau piles, you must either move the whole pile or only the top card, e.g. if you have a [4♣, 3♣, 2♣, A♣], you can move all four cards or just A♣, but you could NOT move [3♣, 2♣, A♣] onto another 4♣.

The pack is turned up one card at a time. These cards can be moved to the tableau or to the foundations. Only two passes through the pack are allowed. The patience is out after all cards have been moved to the foundations.

== See also ==
- Canfield
- List of patiences and card solitaires
- Glossary of patience and card solitaire terms
