= Dutch Blitz =

Card game

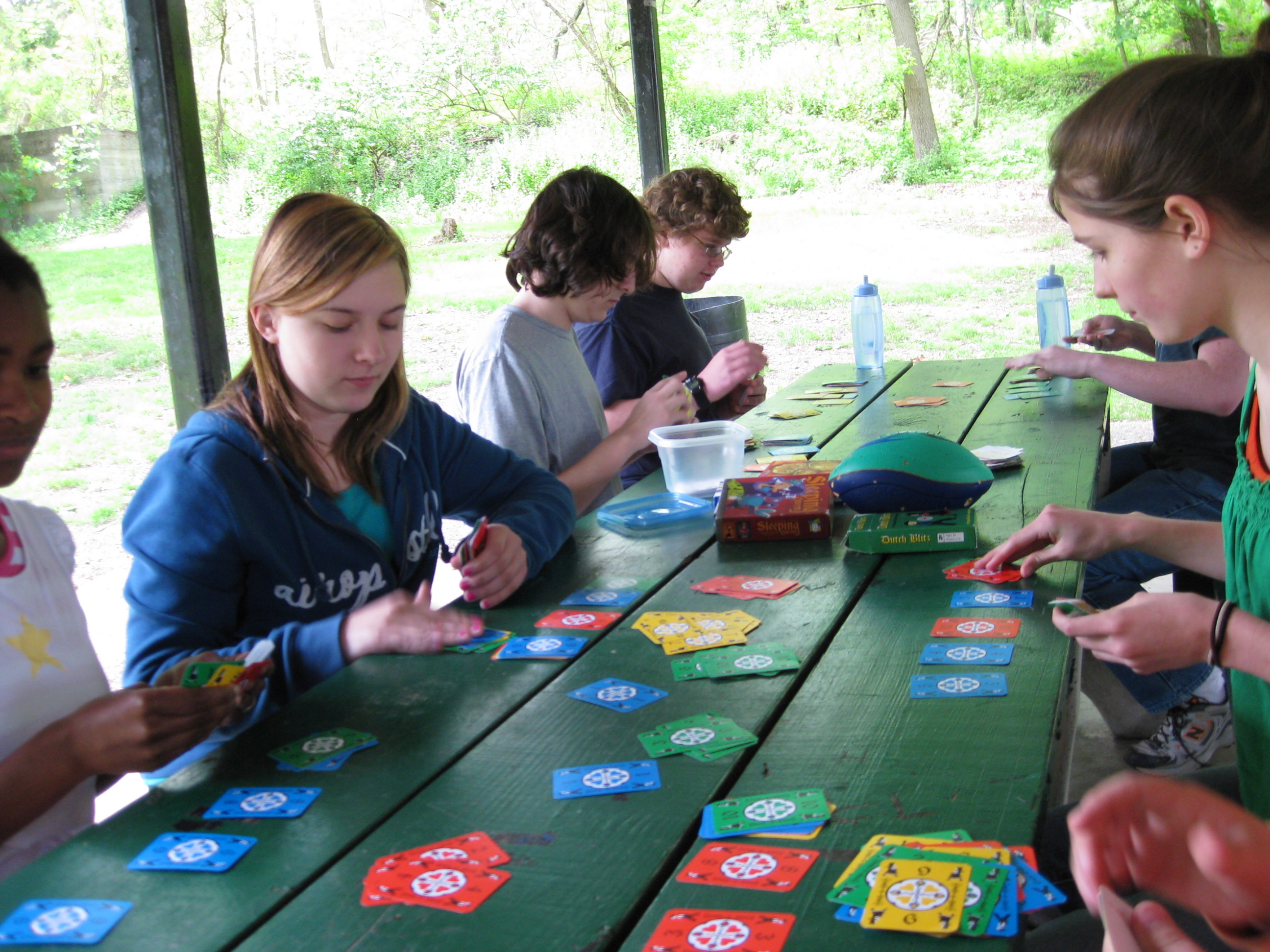
- Homeschooled youths playing Dutch Blitz
- Players: 2-4 or 8 with an expansion pack
- Setup time: < 1 minute
- Playing time: Approximately 5-10 minutes per round
- Chance: Medium
- Age range: 8 and up
- Skills: Hand-eye coordination, speed, counting

Dutch Blitz is a fast-paced, family oriented, action card game played with a specially printed deck. The game was created circa 1937 by Werner Ernst George Muller (born 24 August 1912), a German immigrant from Hamburg, Germany, who settled in Bucks County, Pennsylvania. The game is very popular among the Pennsylvania Amish and Dutch community, and among Christian groups in the United States and Canada (primarily in Mennonite communities). The game is similar to Nerts, which is played with standard playing cards and is in turn based on Canfield, a variant of the classic Klondike Solitaire. Unlike Nerts, Dutch Blitz is played with commercially produced cards.

It is an alternate version of the game Ligretto, manufactured in Germany.

== Contents ==
The game is played with 160 cards, in four decks; Pump, Carriage, Plow, and Pail. Each deck includes 10 red, 10 blue, 10 green, and 10 yellow cards.

== Terminology ==
Blitz Pile
This pile of 10 cards is the most important pile of cards to each player since it is the key towards "Blitzing" the other players when all cards from this pile have been cleared.
Dutch Piles
Stacks of cards in each of the four colors - 1 through 10 in ascending order - placed in the center of the table and played upon by all players. Each player accumulates scoring points here.
Post Pile
Groups of cards placed to the left of both the Blitz and Wood piles in descending order. For each player, the Post Piles serve as a "trading" or replacement area during the game. There are generally three post piles but in a two person game four or five post piles are often used to prevent the game from stalling.
Wood Pile & Your Hand Pile
Stack of cards built to the right of a player, from Wood Pile cards held in that player's hand, flipped 3 at a time. The top card shown is playable.

== Objective ==
The objective of Dutch Blitz is to score points by playing as many cards as possible on Dutch Piles, and by emptying the Blitz Pile as quickly as possible. This is done by playing cards from the Blitz Pile, Post Piles, and Wood Pile on the Dutch piles.

== Point scoring ==
The game ends when a player plays all 10 of the cards out of their Blitz Pile and yells "BLITZ!" Each player scores points at the end of each hand as follows:

1. Add one point for each card that had been thrown out in the Dutch Piles.
2. Subtract two points for each card the player has left in their Blitz Pile.

Usually more rounds are played until one player reaches 75 cumulative points, yet some games have gone on for days at a time.

== Variations ==
A variation of the game relies on larger-sized cards and can be called "Full Contact Dutch Blitz", "Running Dutch Blitz" or "Life Size Dutch Blitz". The larger cards must be physically run to their respective piles. This can also be a team game.

An expansion pack is available for the game that makes the game playable for 5 to 8 players. The expansion changes the colors of the existing Pump, Carriage, Plow, and Pail.
