= Splatalot! =

Television game show

- Genre: Children's game show
- Created by: Mark J.W. Bishop; Matt Hornburg
- Directed by: Rae Upton
- Presented by: Jason Agnew and Matt Chin (Canada USA ) Dick and Dom (UK); Kayne Tremills and Scott Tweedie (Australia); Stacey Harkey and Tori Pence (USA ByuTV)
- Composer: Angelo Oddi
- Countries of origin: Canada; United Kingdom; Australia
- Original language: English
- No. of seasons: 2
- No. of episodes: 53 (52 + 1 special)

Production
- Executive producers: Alan Bishop (challenge producer); Mark J.W. Bishop; Matt Hornburg
- Producer: Steve Sloan
- Production locations: Amaranth, Ontario, Canada
- Running time: 22 minutes
- Production company: marblemedia

Original release
- Network: YTV (Canada); CBBC (United Kingdom); ABC3 (Australia)
- Release: 14 March 2011 – 29 August 2013

Splatalot! is a medieval-themed physical game show that premiered in Canada on Corus Entertainment's YTV on 14 March 2011, hosted by Jason Agnew and Matt Chin. It premiered in the United Kingdom on CBBC on 13 June 2011 with Dick and Dom as hosts and in Australia on ABC3 on 5 November 2011 with Kayne Tremills and Scott Tweedie as hosts. The series was inspired by the game show Wipeout, designed for a younger demographic. The British and Australian CBBC and ABC3 broadcasts of the show used the same filmed footage as the original Canadian YTV version, but with local presenters providing commentary.

Splatalot! was produced by marblemedia and commissioned as an international co-production by Corus Entertainment, the British Broadcasting Corporation and the Australian Broadcasting Corporation. It featured a large, extreme obstacle course and three rounds of competition: "Cross the Moat", "Ditch the Dungeon" ("Escape the Stockade" in the first series), and "Capture the Crown". Each episode features a different group of 12 teenage contestants (known as Attackers) competing against not only the obstacles and the clock but also the Defenders. The Defenders are an international squad of nine medieval-themed gladiators who are tasked with protecting the castle from the Attackers. The winning Attacker is crowned King or Queen of Splatalot!. This king or queen is able to then choose a defender to punish in one of many ways, such as throwing them into the water with a catapult.

== Production ==
The series was produced using a 2.5-acre (12,000 sq yd) set built on a 50-acre (240,000 sq yd) lot located at 44°02'19.0"N 80°13'51.2"W (previously used to shoot The Adrenaline Project) owned by marblemedia in Amaranth, Ontario, Canada and featured contestants from Canada, the United Kingdom and Australia. The company had spent a year collaborating with theme park engineers to design the course.

The first season, consisting of 26 episodes, was shot on location in September and October 2010. On 3 February 2012, the series was renewed for a 26 episode second season. It was shot the following summer.

Following the recording of the series, the set remained abandoned and was a popular attraction for trespassers. The set was later demolished in 2018 as part of a series called "Smashalot!". At the beginning of the first episode, reasons are listed for the demolition, including YouTubers, being too costly to repair, having unpaid property taxes, crack-dealing and opposition from the local community.

== The Attackers ==
Contestants, known as "Attackers" were drawn from schools and sports clubs from across Canada, United Kingdom and Australia. They consist of children aged 12 and up. A different group of attackers feature in every episode.

== The Defenders ==
Splatalot! featured a recurring cast of Defenders, consisting of six charismatic young adults. Each episode featured 3 Defenders per round, (but all six in the Final) ensuring that the audiences never see the same lineup twice. Each Defender has their unique persona, color, costume, and signature weapon as well as their gimmick (akin to that of a supervillain) - they work together to incite laughter and most importantly, impede the Attackers until one of them proves that he or she is worthy of the crown of Splatalot!.

In season 2, Knightriss, Shaiden, Ballista, Tinkor, Gildar, and Crocness left the show, but they returned to the screen for the show's American run on BYUtv. Only Kook, Thorne, and Skabb remained from Season 1, with Madeva, Faetal, and Vane coming in as replacements. Gildar appears for The 'Celebrity Splatdown' only to announce his departure from the show, and was mentioned in 'Teachers Vs Students Splatdown' and 'Sleepy Matty' ('Dicky' in the UK, 'Scotty' in Australia).

The Defenders are (In both seasons):

- Thorne (played by Elliott Francis) – A British warrior. The self-proclaimed bad boy of the group. He is in a permanent bad mood, brooding and grumbling wherever he roams. With his maniacal mohawk and his blue-streaked face, Thorne rarely finds joy in anything but stopping attackers from claiming the crown. His weapon of choice is a spiked mace. When he is in stage 1 he likes to use the fog gun (vaporizer). He is also a 'gentleman' as he says in "We are not alone" where he helps one of the girls (Andrea) up the wall. He is the brother of Season 1 defender Shaiden, both in real life and on the show. In the episode "Sleepy Scotty", Vane uses a fake southern accent to try and make Thorne smile. He succeeds, but only for a second then Thorne quickly fixes his face. He is part of the blue team.
- Kookaburra (played by James Elmer) – A wacky Australian guy and the team's joker in the pack who has a bird-like design, often nicknamed 'Kook'. His weapon of choice is a slingshot, and he is probably the most successful defender on the whole show, though he can act awkward and silly at times; for example, he uses cheerleading chants in the "Parents & Kids Splatdown." He is revealed to have a crush on Shaiden, was once called a green-haired freak, and is known to trick the attackers; for example, pretending the cannon is not working in Round 3, with the defender wanting to seize the "chance". However, when they go, he is revealed to be faking; he presses the button and makes the attacker fall off. He is part of the green team.
- Allan "Skabb" Tonelli (played by Wendo Mhogolo) – An extremely violent Australian barbarian. He's the most dangerous and aggressive of the defenders and is known for being the castle bully. Although he is brutal in his defending, he is known to occasionally have a soft side, which is revealed in a number of episodes. His weapon of choice is a club but he is dangerous with every weapon. He also tends to scare the Attackers and the Defenders without fail. He is part of the green team.

=== In Season 1 ===
- Gildar (played by wrestler RJ City under his real name RJ Skinner) – A narcissistic Canadian Viking who cared only about himself and constantly looked in his mirror, bragging about his muscles, facial features, and his hair. His weapon of choice is a sledgehammer, and with it, he can rid the castle of his biggest hatred: sass from the attackers. In "Party Like It's $19.99," he was in a DVD of "Extreme Viking Makeover," and he published a book called Shoved by a Rainbow in "Shoved by a Rainbow." It is revealed in "Gildar Has a Secret," that he and Crocness were married. In "Talk To The Barrel" he fills in for Kook as he leaves for unknown reasons. He is part of the red team.
- Ballista (played by Samantha Brown) – A manipulative Canadian huntress who suppresses attackers with her physical beauty and deceiving charm. Her weapons of choice are a shield and sword. She also often uses a crossbow. Matt and Jason, from the Canadian version of Splatalot, are both depicted to have a crush on her. In "And the Splatty Goes To," she won the Splatty Award for Most Valuable Defender. She is often depicted as one who feels that the male defenders act like showoffs whenever she does something. She is part of the red team.
- Tinkor (played by Matt Burns) – A Canadian blacksmith who not only has built all of the Defenders' weapons, but his foul stench and appearance repulse everyone in the castle- attackers and defenders alike. His weapon of choice is a catapult, but sometimes he uses a handheld splatzooka. In "Beaver Tails," the attacker Sofia confuses Tinkor for his father Terry, who looks the same to each other. As shown in "Impossible is Nothing" and "Sarthak the Situation," he and Shaiden have a somewhat on-again-off-again relationship. His best friends are typically Kook and Skabb. He is capable of ticking Gildar off when the weapons do not work. He is part of the red team.
- Shaiden (played by Grace Francis) – A British ninja and Thorne's sister who is known for her sneakiness and her temper when another Defender, mainly Skabb, calls her a "little girl;" is constantly annoyed by the other Defenders, as she feels she is the only one focused on the Attackers. Her weapon of choice is a katana. She seems to have an on-again-off-again relationship with Tinkor and tries to tempt Kook into making a fool of himself. During the ending in "It's Taco Day," she uses meditation to calm Skabb down after he loses his cool when Erik captured the Crown of Splatalot. She is Thorne's sister both on the show and in real life. She is part of the blue team.
- Knightriss (played by Gloria Onitiri) – A British knight and Madeva's older sister, who competes with Gildar as the leader of the defenders. Her weapon of choice is a jousting lance. In "Talk to the Barrel," she and Thorne are depicted to have a relationship, as they are seen flirting over their defense styles against the attackers. In "Revenge of the Nerds," she and Thorne are arguing over who should fire the splatzooka. In "Alan Skabb Tonelli," she begins flirting with Skabb bringing on yet another relationship for this indecisive knight. She can be quite threatening towards the attackers and can be rather aggressive towards them. She is part of the blue team.
- Crocness (played by Chenoa Deemal) – A cunning Australian swamptress who wears a crocodile around her neck and is known for her moss-covered hair. Her weapon of choice is a skull staff. Like Shaiden, she shows that she is on the edge who will focus on the attackers more than each other. In "It's Taco Day," she fills in for Gildar in the final round after he leaves the castle for a record label. In "The Cookies Crumble," Matt gives Jason a box of cookies that Crocness made, and they made Jason sick. She is part of the green team.

=== In Season 2 ===
- Madeva (played by Alexia Khadime) – A crazy British dragonslayer. She is the new leader of the defenders. Her weapon of choice is a giant claymore. She is Knightriss' younger sister. She can be quite encouraging to the attackers as she often urges them to do well, specifically in the Cross the Moat round, but it usually appears to be sarcastic encouragement. She is part of the blue team.
- Vane (played by Eric Johnston) – A lazy, greedy and talented yet vain Canadian archer who would rather eat a sandwich than defend the castle. His weapon of choice is a crossbow-styled cannon. He wears sunglasses with his name on them. He often annoys the other defenders, especially Skabb and Thorne, for being unprepared or unengaged with the defending of the castle. He is part of the red team.
- Faetal (played by Nicole Power) – A charming Canadian Amazon who feels all attackers are her favorite. Her Weapon of choice is a dagger and shield. She is revealed to be Gildar's cousin in "Two Drawbridges Up." She is very sweet to the attackers, even if it is an act, and often encourages them to do well, but also often tries to distract them by asking questions or talking to them as they try to complete the round. She is part of the red team.

== Rounds in Splatalot ==
=== Round 1: Cross the Moat ===
Round One sees the Attackers challenged with overcoming a series of large obstacles consisting of barrels, the battle axes, the bridge of disaster, and the Defenders. They start by getting thrown into the water from a catapult and must cross the moat in order to possibly advance to the next round. This round looks at how long it takes them to cross the moat as the fastest six Attackers move on to the next round.

=== Round 2: Escape the Stockade (Ditch the Dungeon in the second season) ===
In this round the Attackers must go up a long staircase, known as the 'Loathsome Ladder.' The Defenders try to stop them from reaching the top of the stairs by using the trademark slime balls, a foam gun and the Vile Volley, a gun that shoots slime balls. There is usually always a Defender at the top of the stairs who uses the Purple Plague (a cart full of purple balls) and the Balls of Doom, very large green balls that are pushed down the staircase to knock the Attackers off. The fastest four Attackers to overcome the obstacles, ditch the dungeon and capture the four flags at the top of the stairs advance to Round 3.

=== Round 3: Capture the Crown ===
In Round 3, the remaining four Attackers must race across the obstacle-ridden courtyard and up to the tower where the crown lies in wait. In their path are all 6 Defenders from both rounds taking up various positions around the courtyard, wielding various weapons and devices to impede the Attackers' progress. In the end, only one Attacker will make it past the Defenders and capture the crown, winning this week's episode. Afterwards, they raise the flag with the Defenders clapping and the winner says the catchphrase, "I'm the king/queen of the castle" in Season 1.

In Season 2, they will choose a Defender to throw into the moat. They are not allowed to pick multiple and can only choose one to do this to. In the event of the night round, the Defender will be blindfolded on the Scary-Go-Round and will have to try and get over it, always ending up with them falling into the moat. The Attacker who wins the episode will announce which the Defender they would like to punish by saying; "My/Our first act as king/queen/ruler of Splatalot is to have one of you thrown into the moat/swamp. I/we wish I/we could do it to/it could be all of you, but today/tonight, it will be you, (insert Defender here)!"

== Interactive ==
As a companion website to the TV series, Splatalot.com featured Flash games and behind-the-scenes bonus material, as well as Defender and Host bios and other features. In 2013, the Splatalot! Dash! mobile game was released on iOS and Android platforms. It was followed by Splatalot Attack: A Hero RPG in 2017.

=== Game Stack ===
This series of online games emulates the athleticism and strategy an Attacker would need to be victorious on Splatalot!. In all, nine stand-alone Flash games are featured that allow users to play as either an Attacker or a Defender. Users have the option of combining their scores to build up their Splatalot! "Coat of Arms."

=== Tour the Castle ===
Users can view floor plans, conceptual drawings and photos of the castle and obstacle course.

=== Behind the Defenders ===
Users can watch bonus video content of the Defenders, as well as view their stats and read their back-stories, similar to that of professional athletes.

=== Highlight Shaker ===
A video highlight reel creator which lets users edit and create their own colour commentary and music to their favorite clips from the TV show. Updated weekly with new clips, users could also share their creations with friends.

== Series overview ==
| Series | Episodes | Originally released | |
| Series | Episodes | First released | Last released |
|---|---|---|---|
| 1 | 26 | 14 March 2011 | 8 December 2011 |
| S | 1 | 3 November 2012 | |
| 2 | 26 | 10 November 2012 | 29 August 2013 |

== Episodes ==
There are 12 attackers in Series 1 & 10 in Series 2. These are the attackers in each episode.

=== Season 1 (2011) ===
| No. | Title | Attackers | Winner | Original release date |
|---|---|---|---|---|
| 1 | "Outnumbered, Outplayed and Outwetted" | Matt, Gita, Laura, Addison, Jordan, Ashley, Tyler, Michelle, Jackie, Charlie, Wesley & Alex | Wesley | 14 March 2011 (Canada); 13 June 2011 (UK) |
| 2 | "Feel the Thunder" | Nick, Ada, Charlie, Anthony, Josephine, Liam, Tyler, Breanna, Janel, Melanie, Heather & Jonathan | Charlie | 15 March 2011 (Canada); 13 June 2011 (UK) |
| 3 | "Sarthak: The Situation" | Ravina, Jacob, Autumn, Liam, Preslee, Sarthak, Maddie, Martin, Ethan, John, Sharissa & Haley | Jacob | 16 March 2011 (Canada); 14 June 2011 (UK) |
| 4 | "Dilgar and Tam" | Ivanka, Sarah, Shaqeel, Tariq, Denver, Michael, Kristen, Kayla, Samantha, Liam, Cole & Ashley | Tariq | 17 March 2011 (Canada); 15 June 2011 (UK) |
| 5 | "Talk to the Barrel" | Aileen, Marlin, Jennifer, Arnay, Janice, Erblin, Matt, Ala, Megan, George, Stephanie & Rob | Jennifer | 21 March 2011 (Canada); 16 June 2011 (UK) |
| 6 | "And the Splatty Goes to" | Derek, Tamia, Kristine, Dylan, Adam, Tianna, Matt, Carolina, Jamie, Ryan, Jacy & Courtney | Jamie | 28 March 2011 (Canada); 17 June 2011 (UK) |
| 7 | "Episodious Splaticus" | Adriana, Nicholas, Mouzhan, Trevon, Shae, Alexander, Anneke, Ajay, Asha, Graham, Hannah & Bradley | Trevon | 28 March 2011 (Canada); 20 June 2011 (UK) |
| 8 | "Allan Skabb Tonelli" | Ellie, Amy, Sam, Emily, Caitlin, Kyle, Sydney, Jacqueline, Steven, Jamie, Deken & Kirsten | Steven | 18 April 2011 (Canada); 21 June 2011 (UK) |
| 9 | "Splat of the Penguins" | Sandra, Henok, Joel, Kaitlyn, Jake, Yasmin, Ashley, Sofia, Shayne, Dylan, Samantha & Taylor | Taylor | 25 April 2011 (Canada); 22 June 2011 (UK) |
| 10 | "Splatter's Delight" | Lizzie, Brad, Jonathan, Lory, Jamie, Clayton, Aaron, Rachel, Laurent, Sophie, Caroline & Keanna | Caroline | 2 May 2011 (Canada); 23 June 2011 (UK) |
| 11 | "Barrel of Love" | Madisyn, Sydney, Chanelle, Craig, Rachel, Graham, Marianna, Megan, Steven, Patrick, Mariko & Chris | Patrick | 9 May 2011 (Canada); 25 July 2011 (UK) |
| 12 | "Horseshoes and Volleyball" | Jenna, Timmy, Sneha, Tristan, Scott, Christine, Mikaela, Patrick, Briane, Arthur, William & Zachery | Jenna | 16 May 2011 (Canada); 26 July 2011 (UK) |
| 13 | "Party Like It's 19.99" | Connor, Sebastien, Shaun, Nakita, Madison, Kyle, Charlie, Samuel, Keisha, Harleen, Cidnee & Mikayla | Samuel | 30 May 2011 (Canada); 27 July 2011 (UK) |
| 14 | "Country Style" | Jacob, Cassidy, Spencer, Greg, Meagan, Paige, Samantha, Paige II, Darrin, Wyatt, Daniel & Tracy | Meagan | 8 September 2011 (Canada); 28 July 2011 (UK) |
| 15 | "The Finger Dance" | Justin, Cameron, Patricia, Nicole, Mackenzie, Sebastian, Thompson, Monique, Michelle, Samantha, Sarah & Curtis | Mackenzie | 15 September 2011 (Canada); 29 July 2011 (UK) |
| 16 | "Shoved by a Rainbow" | Kyle, Tressa, Corey, Tamara, Maha, Nathan, Hazel, Jacob, Colleen, Andrea, John & Carly | John | 22 September 2011 (Canada); 1 August 2011 (UK) |
| 17 | "Revenge of the Nerds" | Emily, Alexander, Jordan, Kaylee, Campbell, Hannah, Sarah, Matthew, Benita, Connor, Kiara & Rossi | Connor | 29 September 2011 (Canada); 2 August 2011 (UK) |
| 18 | "What Came First the Chicken or the Kook" | Lucas, Nicole, Shania, Mitchell, Benito, Ana, Julian, Katrina, Taylor, Stefan, Audrey & Chyrelle | Katrina | 6 October 2011 (Canada); 3 August 2011 (UK) |
| 19 | "Let's Get Unitarded" | Marco, Julian, Danielle, Travis, Jenn, Dominic, Sydney, Nicole, Olivia, Connor, Derek & Steven | Dominic | 13 October 2011 (Canada); 4 August 2011 (UK) |
| 20 | "Impossible is Nothing" | Eli, Bradley, Holly, Carisa, Andrew, Sienna, Julia, Ian, Patrick, Drita, Taylor & Jamie | Bradley | 20 October 2011 (Canada); 5 August 2011 (UK) |
| 21 | "The Cookies Crumble" | Estelle, Clare, Josh, Laurie, Alex, Olivia, Nicole, Adrian, Robyn, Julia, Janessa & Dustin | Dustin | 3 November 2011 (Canada); 8 August 2011 (UK) |
| 22 | "Gildar Has a Secret" | Taylor, Devin, Dana, Austin, Madison, Michael, Carley Marie, Chris, Jesse, Carina, Tori & Mona | Chris | 10 November 2011 (Canada); 9 August 2011 (UK) |
| 23 | "Beaver Tails" | Haley, Michael, Anish, Danielle, Kiana, Hannah, Sarah, Calvin, Corinne, Sofia, Steven & Brandon | Michael | 17 November 2011 (Canada); 10 August 2011 (UK) |
| 24 | "The Unhappy Dance" | Kate, Sandra, Cole, Madison, Oliver, Amanda, John, Jenna, Jeff, Astrid, Amina & Jarid | John | 24 November 2011 (Canada); 11 August 2011 (UK) |
| 25 | "It's Taco Day" | Erik, Emily, Carmen, Margaret, Sam, Stephanie, Michael, Sharon, Zaryn, Elijah, Ellen & Marcus | Erik | 1 December 2011 (Canada); 12 August 2011 (UK) |
| 26 | "Crocness and the Corner of Doom" | Stacey, Kira, Fraser, Adrian, Nicholas, Ryan, Shanker, Madison, Breana, Ethan, Shaun & Lian | Nicholas | 8 December 2011 (Canada); 15 August 2011 (UK) |

=== Special (2012) ===
| No. | Title | Attackers | Defender in the moat | Original release date | Winner |
|---|---|---|---|---|---|
| 1 | "Celebrity Splatdown" | Brendan Meyer, Matreya Fedor, Gig Morton, Kurt Ostlund and Emily Tennant (Mr. Young); Torri Webster, Madison Pettis, Nathan McLeod, Michael Murphy and Jake Goodman (Life with Boys) | Gildar | 3 November 2012 | Brendan Meyer |

The second season premiered on 3 November 2012 on YTV with a one-hour "Celebrity Splatdown" special between the casts of Life with Boys and Mr. Young, who were respectively competing on behalf of ONEXONE's First Nations School Breakfast Programs and YMCA of Canada's food programs for a $3,000 cheque. It was filmed in front of a live audience.

=== Season 2 (2013, UK) ===
| No. | Title | Attackers | Defender in the moat | Original release date | Winner |
|---|---|---|---|---|---|
| 27 | "You Simmer Down" | Erica, Tobi, Taylor, Liam, Julia, Brandon, Brianna, Nehemiah, Justin & Tyke | Thorne | 10 November 2012 (Canada); 11 February 2013 (UK) | Tyke |
| 28 | "Girls vs. Boys Splatdown" | Asvini, Owen, Katherine, Ben, Tyson, Ayda, Daniel, Nina, Jayson & Breanne | Skabb | 17 November 2012 (Canada); 12 February 2013 (UK) | Daniel |
| 29 | "Classic Nana" | Isabella, Cameron, Elyjah, Brooke-Lynn, Sarah, Dustin, Brianna, Madison, Darren & Brendan | Faetal | 24 November 2012 (Canada); 13 February 2013 (UK) | Elyjah |
| 30 | "Sleepy Matty (Dicky or Scotty)" | Tim, John, Celeste, Danielle, Judy, Heather, Sarah, Brandon, Brent & Matthew | Vane | 5 January 2013 (Canada); 14 February 2013 (UK) | Brandon |
| 31 | "You Bet Your Trousers" | Nadia, Madison, Brooke, Jacob, Goran, Taylor, Saad, Marcus, Luke & Mikayla | Skabb | 19 January 2013 (Canada); 15 February 2013 (UK) | Brooke |
| 32 | "We Are Not Alone" | Tianna, Brendan, Stef, Caleb, Chloe, Tristan, Austin, Andrea, Kiyan & Mandy | Skabb | 2 February 2013 (Canada); 18 February 2013 (UK) | Tristan |
| 33 | "Two Drawbridges Up" | Forrest, Monica, Alyssa, Mitchell, Marco, Keara, Kylee, Taylor, Michaela & Mark | Skabb | 9 February 2013 (Canada); 19 February 2013 (UK) | Taylor |
| 34 | "The Magic of Television" | Kyra, Tristin, Mandy, Marco, Bianca, Jacob, Natasha, Iarin, Jordan & Robbie | Vane | 16 February 2013 (Canada); 20 February 2013 (UK) | Marco |
| 35 | "Splatalot Days & Splatalot Nights" | Emily, Collin, Summer, Nic, Jordan, Mai, Tyrell, Alanna, Victoria & Joshua | Skabb | 16 February 2013 (Canada); 21 February 2013 (UK) | Emily |
| 36 | "Of Mice and Splatmen" | Cashmeira, Alexa, Jasmine, Brett, Travis, Keaton, Chris, Andrew, Grace & Craig | Madeva | 23 February 2013 (Canada); 22 February 2013 (UK) | Cashmeira |
| 37 | "Nation vs. Nation Splatdown" | Eftihia (Greece), Lara (Turkey), Jayden (Australia), Rebecca (USA), Leanne (UK), Dayton (Canada), Adrianna (Serbia), Veronika (Brazil), Jordan (Jamaica) & Joshua (Italy) | Skabb | 2 March 2013 | Joshua |
| 38 | "When Hairy Met Matty" | Christianna, Alexsandra, Joshua, Maarukh, Hasan, Rafael, Brittany, Carly, Tobias & Victoria | Kookaburra | TBA | Tobias |
| 39 | "Dude, Where's My Crown?" | Daniel, Seana, Markus, Jack, Victoria, Ashley, Cassidy, Turner, Princess & Bryan | Vane | TBA | Turner |
| 40 | "Twins vs. Twins Splatdown" | Steph & Jillian, Steph & Sarah, Rane & Jared, Marwa & Elham and Aunna & James | Kookaburra | TBA | Rane & Jared |
| 41 | "Teachers vs. Students Splatdown" | Miss Melissa, Shaishav, Mr Chris, Mikayla, Ryleigh, Mr Dain, Olivia, Selwyn, Miss Jessie & Mr Charles | Faetal | TBA | Mr Dain |
| 42 | "Best Friends Splatdown" | Krystal & Dominique, Jared & Rajan, Taylor & Kyle, Mary & Connor & Wyatt & Noah | Thorne | 20 August 2013 | Mary & Connor |
| 43 | "Parents & Kids Splatdown" | Charles & Dave, Dawn & Grant, Sam & Tracey, Adrea & Adler & Natasha & Rick | Thorne | 12 January 2013 | Charles & Dave |
| 44 | "Parents & Kids Splatdown II" | Sebastien & Jocelynne, Manny & Pearce, Randy & Juliet, Sandra & Victoria & James & Bryanna | Faetal | 27 August 2013 | Sebastien & Jocelynne |
| 45 | "Awesome Sandwich Club" | Bailey, Jade, Cameron, Emma, Griffen, Elijah, Amanda, Chami, Ryan & Joshua | Vane | 20 August 2013 | Griffen |
| 46 | "Car Trouble" | Neil, Shantae, Ellie, Hannah, Kevin, Braden, Kayla, Sarah, Travis & Quinton | Madeva | 13 August 2013 | Neil |
| 47 | "Splatalot! Dancealot!" | Keenan, Hannah, Shania, Parker, Alvan, Jor-El, Kelsey, Talia, Aimee & James | Vane | 14 August 2013 | Parker |
| 48 | "Three Cheers for Everything" | Lachlan, Anushka, Sarah, Kyle, Bronwyn, Kallie, Jastinder, Annupal, Samantha & Sam | Vane | 15 August 2013 | Lachlan |
| 49 | "Bucket List: Check" | Sean, Lauren, Owen, Keith, Tyler, Kaylin, Aliana, Christopher, Haley & Madison | Skabb | 21 August 2013 | Christopher |
| 50 | "Jay and the Madman" | Aristasia, Reece, Liam, Taylor, Emily, Madison, Jack, Tyler, Rida & Brayden | Kookaburra | 22 August 2013 | Brayden |
| 51 | "Laundry Day" | Nick, Jordan, Joycelynn, Soranne, Abby, Jacob, Michela, Nathan, Tyree & Dylan | Vane | 28 August 2013 | Tyree |
| 52 | "Call Matt the Handyman Maybe" | Paige, Teah, Giancarlo, Jenn, Jake, Hailey, Rahul, Arran, Breanne & Michael | Kookaburra | 29 August 2013 | Michael |

== International broadcast ==
The Canadian version premiered on Nickelodeon in the United States on 16 July 2012. The British version aired on Disney XD channels in the EMEA regions. Dutch broadcaster Z@PP filmed their own host segments with local talent Ron Boszhard and Viviënne van den Assem in 2012. Splatalot! has been seen in over 100 countries worldwide.

On 13 March 2018, BYUtv announced that they had acquired the rights to air the series in the United States. On 2 April, the channel began running the first season of the show with new hosted segments starring Stacey Harkey and Tori Pence. On 8 October, the channel began airing the second season, again with Harkey and Pence hosting. Both seasons are now archived on the stations website with Harkey and Pence's commentary remaining exclusive to the network.

Reruns can be seen on the Canadian game show channel GameTV, starting in the fall of 2019, and again in spring 2021.

== Smashalot! ==
Following the conclusion of the second season's production in 2012, the show's unattended set in Amaranth, Ontario attracted the attention of trespassers. A YouTube video by user Bright Sun Films exploring the location garnered over 600,000 viewers before being pulled a year later at the request of marblemedia. The set hadn't been dismantled as the producers continued to pursue a revival of the show. Due to safety concerns, the township's mayor had requested the presence of around the clock security.

In late 2017, marblemedia confirmed it was developing a family-oriented revival set to begin shooting in the summer of 2018. However, those plans were abandoned and the set was later demolished in January 2019. marblemedia turned the demolition into a YouTube spin-off series called Smashalot!. Featuring former contestants and YouTube personalities (including Bright Sun Films) destroying a segment of the castle in each episode, the show is hosted by Jason Agnew and Gildar.

=== Episodes ===
| No. | Title | Original release date |
|---|---|---|
| 1 | "Everyone's Favorite Viking" | 28 February 2019 |
| 2 | "It's Damp, Sure" | 28 February 2019 |
| 3 | "Gildar with a J" | 28 February 2019 |
| 4 | "You Big Baby" | 28 February 2019 |
| 5 | "Same Old Same Old" | 28 February 2019 |
| 6 | "Undead Smasher" | 28 February 2019 |
| 7 | "Kingdom Kondos" | 7 March 2019 |
| 8 | "We All Have Faults" | 7 March 2019 |
| 9 | "Baby Troll Doll" | 7 March 2019 |
| 10 | "Sisters of Eastwick" | 7 March 2019 |
| 11 | "Raccoon Family Robinson" | 7 March 2019 |
| 12 | "Wisp of Glory" | 7 March 2019 |
