= Jason Agnew =

Radio personality, Game show host, TV Personality

- Education: Bishop Allen Academy; Ryerson University (now Toronto Metropolitan University)
- Occupations: Radio personality, TV producer, game-show host
- Years active: 1999–present

Jason Agnew is a Canadian television producer, host, radio personality, and writer. He is also known as the founding producer and original host of Canada's Emmy Award-winning BITE Television Network, which is also known as Makeful.

== Early life ==
He attended high school at Bishop Allen Academy. Following high school, Jason Agnew attended the Radio & Television Arts program at Ryerson University (now Toronto Metropolitan University).

== Career ==
Agnew is a host for CFRB in Toronto. He has also hosted shows such as Splatalot!, Tiny Talent Time, Live Audio Wrestling and Brain Battle on Global TV. He has hosted the interactive television game shows PopQ and Time Shift Trivia. He previously cohosted Bite TV's The Conventioneers alongside Matt Chin. He is now the host and executive producer of Sunday Night's Main Event, a spiritual successor to Live Audio Wrestling, on TSN 1150 Hamilton, and the host of The Zone and The Zone Weekend.
