= Eagle Wing =

Card game

- A Patience game
- Alternative names: Thirteen Down
- Family: Demon
- Deck: Single 52-card

Eagle Wing (otherwise known as Thirteen Down) is a Patience game which is played with a deck of 52 playing cards. The game takes its name from the tableau which depicts an eagle-like bird spreading its wings in flight. It is somewhat related to the Canfield variant Storehouse (Thirteen Up).

== Rules ==
Thirteen cards are dealt face down as one pile, and will act as the "trunk" of the eagle, e.g the reserve. Four cards are dealt each to the left and right of the trunk (eight cards in all), which act as the "wings" of the eagle, i.e. the tableau. After these 21 cards are dealt, a twenty-second card is placed above the "eagle", which is the base of the first foundation; the three other foundations must start with cards with the same rank.

The cards on the wings are available only to be built on the foundations, which are built up by suit and round-the-corner (aces placed on top of kings). Gaps are immediately filled with cards face-up from the trunk.

When there are no more moves to be made from the wings, the stock is dealt one card at a time to be played onto the foundations. Unplayed cards are placed on the waste pile, the top card of which is available for play. The stock can be dealt three times, i.e. two redeals are allowed by picking up the wastepile and turning it face down.

When the trunk is down to its last card, it is turned face up and immediately available to be built onto the foundations without having to wait for an empty space on the wings. Afterwards, any space on the wings may be filled with a card from the stock or the wastepile.

The game ends when all moves have been made after the stock has been dealt the third time. The game is won when all cards are built up in the foundations.

== Variations ==
As described there is no building allowed in the tableau, and this makes wins extremely rare. In her book 100 Games of Solitaire, Helen L. Coops allows building down by suit in the tableau. Many software implementations of Eagle Wing follow these rules, with a maximum of three cards per space. This makes the chances of winning as much as 80%.

Other variations adjust the number of redeals, or the size of the trunk. Variations include Wings and Bald Eagle.

== See also ==
- Storehouse
- Canfield
- List of solitaires
- Glossary of solitaire
