= Duchess (card game) =

Solitaire card game

- A Patience game
- Alternative names: Glenwood
- Type: Reserved packer
- Family: Demon
- Deck: Single 52-card
- Playing time: 10 min
- Odds of winning: 1 in 8

Duchess or Glenwood is a patience or solitaire card game which uses a deck of 52 playing cards. It has all four typical features of a traditional patience or solitaire game: a tableau, a reserve, a stock or talon and a wastepile. It is relatively easy to get out. It is a reserved packer, the same type of game as Canfield or Demon. Arnold describes it as "an interesting game with a fair chance of a favourable outcome."

== History ==
Duchess was invented by Albert Morehead and Geoffrey Mott-Smith for their 1950 treatise on solitaire and patience games and given the alternative name of Glenwood. It has been included in subsequent works by, for example, David Parlett, Peter Arnold.

== Rules ==
First, four fans of three cards are set up; they form the reserve. Then a space is left for the four foundations, then four cards are placed in a row; they form the bases for the tableau columns.

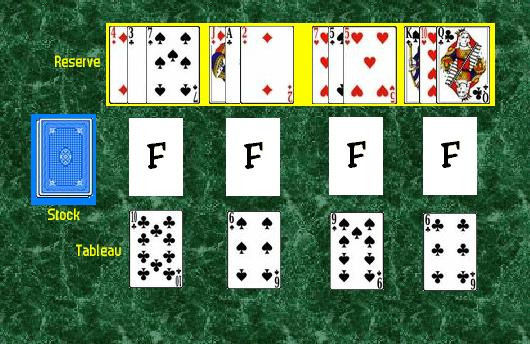
The initial layout in Duchess.

To start the game, the player will choose among the top cards of the reserve fans which will start the first foundation pile. Once he/she makes that decision and picks a card, the three other cards with the same rank, whenever they become available, will start the other three foundations.

The top cards of the reserve fans and the top cards of the columns in the tableau are available for play onto the foundations or on the tableau. The foundations are built up by suit and ranking is continuous as Aces are placed over Kings. The cards on the tableau are built down in alternating colors. Ranking is also continuous in the tableau as Kings can be placed over Aces. One card can be moved at a time, but sequences can also be moved as one unit. No cards can be built on the reserve.

Spaces that occur on the tableau are filled with any top card in the reserve. If the entire reserve is exhausted however, it is not replenished; spaces that occur after this point have to be filled with cards from the waste pile or, if a wastepile has not been made yet, the stock.

The stock is dealt one card at a time to the wastepile, the top card of which is available for play. There is one redeal allowed. To prepare for the redeal, the remaining cards in the wastepile are collected and turned face down to become the new stock.

The game is won when all cards are built onto the foundations.

== Bibliography ==
- Arnold, Peter (2011). Card Games for One. 2nd edn. London: Chambers.
- Barry, Sheila Anne, World's Best Card Games for One
- Morehead, Albert H. & Mott-Smith, Geoffrey (1950). The Complete Book of Solitaire & Patience Games
- Parlett, David (1979). The Penguin Book of Patience. London: Penguin.

== See also ==
- Canfield
- List of patiences and solitaires
- Glossary of patience and solitaire terms
