= Elliot Francis =

British actor

- Born: Elliott Charles Francis; August 16, 1987 (age 38); Stockton-on-Tees, England
- Occupation: Actor
- Website: www.elliottfrancis.com

Elliott Charles Francis (born 16 August 1987) is a British actor.

== Early life ==
Francis was brought up in North East England and started acting at a young age. He was a student of Stagecoach Theatre Arts for six years. Later he moved to London, where he won a full scholarship in 2004 to attend Redroofs Theatre School, graduating in 2006. In 2012, he graduated from Teesside University with a degree in Computer Animation.

== Career ==
In 2011, Francis landed the role of Thorne in the Canadian children's game show Splatalot! and so did his sister Grace as Shaiden. He also spent three years playing the part of a Slytherin student on several Harry Potter films, and had a minor role in the Little Dorrit miniseries for the BBC. In 2015 he was nominated for a World Music & Independent Film Festival award for his performance in My Lonely Me as Sam.

== Theatre ==
- The Merry Wives of Windsor, by Shakespeare as fairy (Royal Shakespeare Company)
- The Demon Headmaster Musical, by Mathew White as Charlie (-)
- East Meets West, by Sanjiv Bashir as Business Man (Tara Arts)

== Filmography ==
=== Film ===
| Year | Title | Role | Notes |
|---|---|---|---|
| 2007 | The All Together | Chav | |
| 2007 | Atonement | Soldier | |
| 2008 | Lost And Found | Andrew | Short Film |
| 2009 | SuperGoths | John | Short Film |
| 2009 | Harry Potter and the Half-Blood Prince | Unidentified Slytherin Student | |
| 2010 | One Night in Turin | Footballer | |
| 2010 | Harry Potter and the Deathly Hallows – Part 1 | Unidentified Slytherin Student | |
| 2011 | Harry Potter and the Deathly Hallows – Part 2 | Unidentified Slytherin Student | |
| 2015 | My Lonely Me | Sam | |
| 2016 | Impatient Patient Disorder | Special Agent | Post-Production |
| 2021 | Nemesis (2021 film) | Waiter | Post-Production |

=== Television ===
| Year | Title | Role | Notes |
|---|---|---|---|
| 2004 | Byker Grove | Dance Partner | 1 episode |
| 2005 | Shakespeare's Happy Endings | Swimmer | 1 episode |
| 2008 | Little Dorrit | Errand Boy | 7 episodes |
| 2008 | After You've Gone | Hooded Youth | 1 episode |
| 2011 | Crimewatch | Attacker (reenactment) | 1 episode |
| 2011-2013 | Splatalot! | Thorne | 52 episodes |
| 2013 | The Slammer | Thorne Splatalot!/Special Confinement Act | 1 episode |

== Awards and nominations ==
| Year | Association | Category | Nominated work | Result |
|---|---|---|---|---|
| 2015 | World Music & Independent Film Festival | Best Supporting Actor | My Lonely Me | Nominated |
