= Speed (card game) =

Card game for two or more players

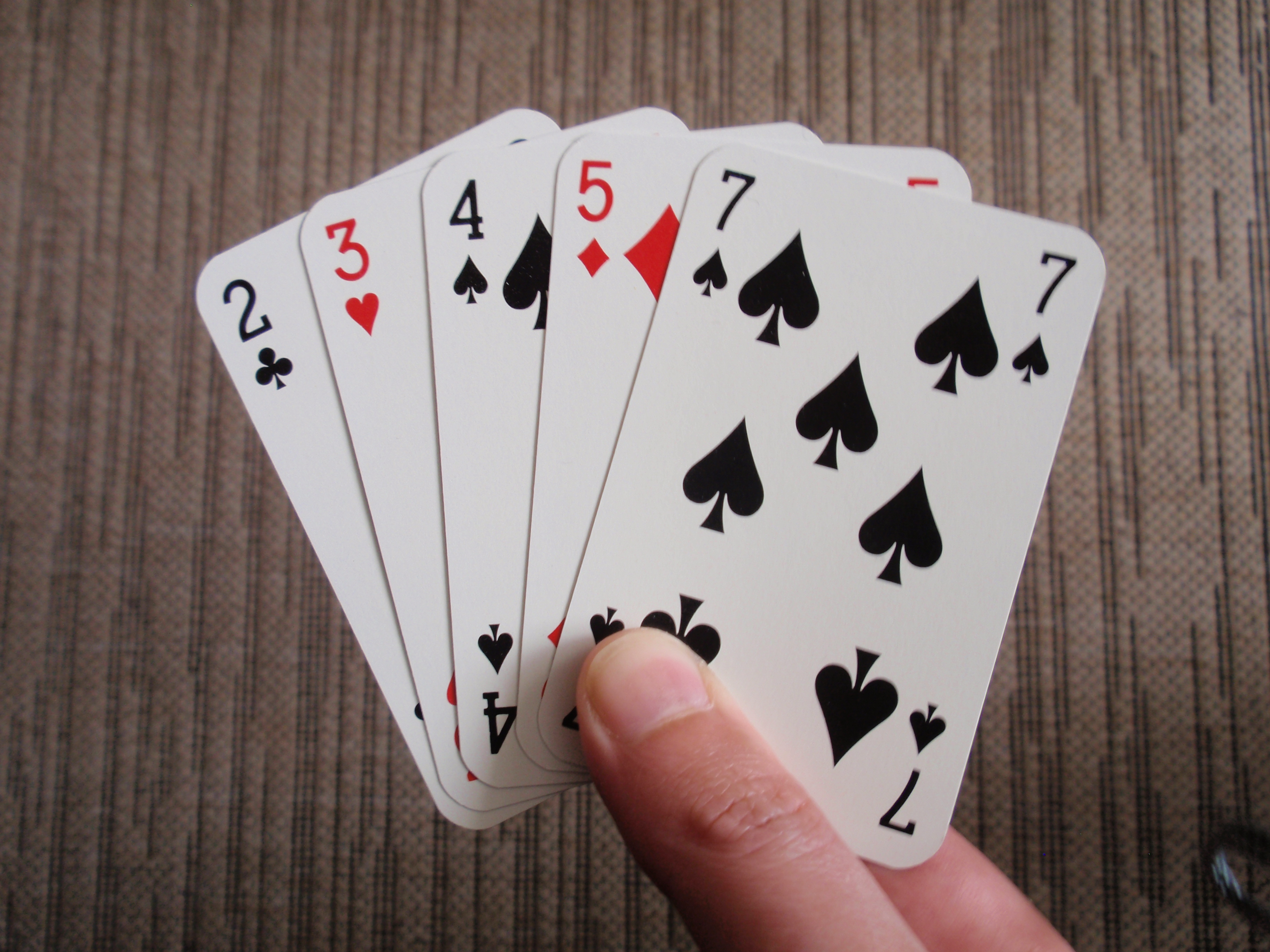
- Type: Shedding-type
- Players: 2
- Skills: Speed, Memorization, Counting
- Age range: 5+
- Deck: Anglo-American
- Playing time: any time
- Chance: Low

Related games
- Spit

Speed is a game for two players of the shedding family of card games, in which players try to get rid of all of their cards first. It is a form of competitive patience similar to Spit.

== Dealing ==
Each player is dealt five cards to form a hand, and 15 cards face down to the side as a draw pile. Two six-card piles are then dealt in the center, face down.

== Play ==
With two players, the round begins when the players flip one of the face-down cards in the center simultaneously. Players must then discard their hand cards any number of cards at once, using only one hand, matching cards so that each card played is either one number above, one number below, or the same number as the two cards on top of the center stacks. This must be done without hesitating to shuffle cards or otherwise delay the game. Only one card can be placed at a time. The ace and two can be placed on top of one another, forming a looping sequence. Whenever the number of cards in a player's hand drops below five, the player has to take more cards from the draw pile to bring it back up to five cards until the draw pile is depleted. When players run out of options for play they simultaneously flip a card from the side piles onto the top of the central piles. If these piles become depleted, the central stacks are shuffled individually and are placed face-down as new side piles from which cards can be flipped.

All cards will end up on the table and out of hands of the players if there are no mistakes.

=== Jokers ===
Speed can be played with jokers as wild cards. For example, if there is a 2 in the center, a joker can be used as a 3, an ace, or, in Doubles rules, a 2. When a joker is played, it must be treated as the card it was played as. For example, if a joker is played on a 2, the joker can be treated an ace or a three. In any other case, a joker can also be whatever a player wants it to be. It is often prudent to save a joker in one's hand for when one is otherwise out of options or for when it would act as a missing link for a long string of moves. This is cheating if both players flip the outside cards onto the center. Players are only allowed to flip once they cannot play anything else, and because the joker is a wild card, it can be played. A joker cannot be the last card a player puts down, because jokers cannot "top" the deck. Once a joker is placed, the player that is quick enough to put down the next card claims that joker.

=== Verbal Win ===
Players running out of cards says "Speed!" and hits the table to officially win. If a player fails to do whatever has been agreed on beforehand, that player must take one of the central stacks as a draw pile and resume playing.

As a variation, sometimes the rules state that once either player runs out of cards, both players are eligible to hit the stack and say "Speed!" and whichever does it first is the winner. This still highly favors whoever runs out of cards first.

=== Three- and Four-Hand Speed ===
Speed can be played with more than just two people. With three players, it is unnecessary to have extra cards; cards are dealt by giving each player five 'side pile' cards, placing three cards face down in the center, and dealing the extra cards evenly as draw piles. With four players, it is often more interesting to use two decks of cards shuffled together. This is the case for quicker or more experienced players; with new, slow or young players, it is often appropriate to use only one deck, as this slows the game considerably. It is, of course, possible to have more than four players in a single game, but the playing field quickly becomes confusing and muddled simply because of the distance and amount of action.

=== California Spit ===
Also known as Super-spit in Wisconsin, Spit 2 in Texas, Rush in Missouri, and Spit 3 in Kentucky, and Blackie Spit in British Columbia. California Spit is a fast-paced shedding card game that has the added bonus of shuffling the deck.

The two players sit at opposite sides of a horizontal playing surface. The dealer deals half of the cards to each player. The cards are held face down. Every round, each player plays five cards face up vertically in between both players and slightly closer to themselves. Once both players have done this, they look for two or more cards having the same number. When a player finds one, he places another card on top of the cards with that number until all of the cards with the common number are covered. In other words, if there are three fours out then all three cards can get a new card on top of it. If a four is played on top of a four it is called a double, and the player may place a third card on top of it. This requires that players pay attention to the cards they are laying down on the pile. If a player runs out of cards then that player wins. When there are no more groups of cards remaining, each player scoops up the four piles directly in front of them and places them face down on the bottom of his or her deck. That round ends and the next begins.

=== Spit ===
Spit is a similar game in which two players simultaneously put down cards in ascending or descending order, until all of one player's cards are gone. In Speed each player holds up to five cards, and has one stock pile, face down. Two cards can be put down at once. You can not put down more than 2 at once. In Spit each player has a row of stock piles, usually five, with the top card face up, so all cards in play are visible to both players.

Speed:

		A: Hand (5)		A: Stock Pile (10)
B: Spit Cards (10)	B: Spit Pile (1)		A: Spit Pile (1)	A: Spit Cards (10)
B: Stock Pile (10)		B: Hand (5)		

Spit:

A: Stock Cards (1 Up, 4 Down)	(1 Up, 3 Down)	(1 Up, 2 Down)	(1 Up, 1 Down)	(1 Up)
B: Spit Cards (10)	B: Spit Pile (1)		A: Spit Pile (1)	A: Spit Cards (10)
B: Stock Cards (1 Up )	(1 Up, 1 Down)	(1 Up, 2 Down)	(1 Up, 3 Down)	(1 Up, 4 Down)

In both games each player is dealt a set of 10 "Spit Cards", face down, and one card, face down, in their "Spit Pile". (See middle row of the diagrams).

In Speed each player is also dealt 10 cards in a "Stock Pile", and a Hand of 5 cards.

In Spit each player lays out 15 cards in a "tableau" of 5 Stock Piles, with the topmost card of each pile turned up.

The game starts with each player simultaneously turning over the card in their Spit Pile.

Subsequent played cards are placed face up on either of these Spit Piles, in ascending or descending order (with aces fitting next to both kings and twos).

In Speed cards are played from the hand, which is replenished from the player's stock pile.

In Spit the visible cards are played, and the card under it is then turned up. If a stock pile position is empty then a card can be moved from any other stock pile, whose next card is turned face up.

(In both games the replenishment of the hand or stock piles is not necessarily done immediately.)

If neither player can move, then each turns over a Spit Card onto their Spit Pile and the game restarts. If a player runs out of Spit Cards then the top card in their Spit Pile is left on the table, and the rest are shuffled and used as Spit Cards.

The game is won by the first player to get rid of their stock cards (and, in Speed, their hand).

(In Speed the actual number of Stock Cards and Spit Cards can vary. The names and positions of the various piles of cards also vary. The terminology in this section follows McLeod.)

== Strategy ==
Strategy in Speed is limited by the fact that players must attempt to play everything they have in their hands, but there are many tricks that can help slow an opponent or speed the process of getting rid of cards. For example, it is usually prudent to arrange cards of adjacent rank together, but it is better to have cards in the order in which they can be played. This is often a consideration to be taken at the beginning of the game, since it is often too time-consuming during play. For example, if dealt cards of ranks 4, 5, 5, 6 and 6, it is best to order them 4, 5, 6, 5, 6 rather than in standard ascending numerical order.

If by any means it is revealed which cards are in an opponent's hand, it is often possible to 'block' the opponent from playing by not leading up to a point at which their card could be played. Each card in the game must be played individually, this may be a disadvantage to some, however can prove to be advantageous. For example, if a player knows that their opponent has a King, and the card showing is a Jack, it is better for them to play a ten than a Queen, since the Queen would allow the opponent to play. If both options are available, it is best to "explore" the former, by playing a card, then drawing back up to five to see if more moves can be made. On the other hand, it is sometimes advisable for a player to feed an opponent opportunities, if they will result in the value on the deck moving towards a large run in the player's own hand. This is often the case when a hand contains multiple cards of the same number. A player cannot play a ten if there is a king on a deck.

It is common to attempt to distract an opponent by making conversation or announcing one's moves aloud as they are made.

== See also ==
- Nertz
