= Ligretto =

Card game

- Box of Ligretto 'Green Pack' playing cards
- Publishers: Schmidt-Spiele and Playroom Entertainment
- Publication: 1988
- Genres: Card game
- Players: 2-12
- Setup time: < 1 minute
- Playing time: Approximately 5-10 minutes per round, 30+ minutes per game
- Chance: Medium
- Age range: 8 and up
- Skills: Hand-eye coordination, reaction time, counting

Ligretto is a card game for two to twelve players. The game in its current form was designed by Michael Michaels and published in 1988 by the German company Rosengarten Spiele. Since 2000 the game has been published by Schmidt-Spiele of Berlin, Germany. A blue version of the game has been published by Playroom Entertainment in North America and other English-speaking countries since 2009.

The objective of the game is to get rid of your cards faster than the other players by discarding them in the middle of the table.

The game is based on and is similar to Dutch Blitz. Both card games use specially printed cards, but feature gameplay almost identical to Nerts, which is played with standard playing cards, and is in turn based on Canfield, a variant of the classic Klondike Solitaire.

== History ==
Ligretto was first released in 1988 by the German company Rosengarten Spiele. It may have been inspired by Rasender Teufel, invented in 1927 in Leipzig, which had an almost identical set of rules and play style. It is also inspired by Dutch Blitz, which was invented to teach children about colors and numbers.

Good Time Holding bought the rights for the game in 1999, and since 2000 it has been published by the subsidiary Schmidt Spiele. Since its release, it has sold more than 4 million copies.

== Gameplay ==
The game employs a unique deck of 160 cards. Each card features a face of red, green, yellow, or blue colour, and is numbered from 1 to 10. Every player receives 40 cards (ten of each colour), which possess a distinctive design on the reverse side, exclusive to that player.

=== Setup ===
Each player deals out their own deck by shuffling their cards and placing ten cards face up on the table to form a "stack." The cards on the stack are face-up, with the numbers visible to the players. Additionally, three cards (four cards in a three-player game, five cards in a two-player game) are displayed face up next to this stack; these constitute the "row", whose numbers are also visible to players. The remaining cards are held in each player's hand.

=== Play ===
The game initiates when a player exclaims "Ligretto!" Then, players simultaneously discard cards onto the central table area. A legal card is any that is the next card in numerical order and in the same colour as the one currently in any pile, or a '1' card. New piles can only be initiated when a player acquires and plays a '1' card. A '1' card must be played from either the player's row or their hand. A pile is complete when the '10' card is played on top, after which no cards can be played on that pile.

If a player is unable to play any card, they must deal three cards from their hand and reveal only the top-most card. They must continue this until the revealed card can be played.

If no player can play another card, all participants reshuffle their hand, and a player proclaims "Ligretto!" to recommence the game.

The game completes when a player discards all cards from their stack pile and declares "Ligretto stop!"

== Scoring ==
At the end of each round, all cards on the table are flipped over, returned to the players and tallied.

Each player gets one point for each card they played to the middle of the table, ignoring the number on the cards. Two points are then subtracted for each card remaining on their stack. Once the scores have been calculated, each player shuffles their set of 40 cards to start a new round. The player who declares "Ligretto stop" first is not necessarily the player who acquires the highest number of points.

The game continues until a player reaches a score of 99 points and wins. If more than one player scores 99 points in a round, the player with the highest points wins.

== Game packs ==
Ligretto comes in red, green, and blue packs. Each pack, containing cards for four players, has a different set of markings on the card backs. Having all three packs allows up to 12 players to play at a time.

== See also ==
- Nerts, a similar game played with regular playing cards
- Dutch Blitz, a similar proprietary game
