= Canfield (solitaire) =

Card game

- Solitaire game
- Origin: England
- Alternative names: Demon
- Named variants: Chameleon, Rainbow, Selective Canfield, Storehouse, Superior Canfield
- Type: Reserved packer
- Family: Demon
- Deck: Single 52-card
- Odds of winning: 1 in 30

Canfield (US) or Demon (UK) is a solitaire card game with a very low probability of winning. It is an English game first called Demon Patience and described as "the best game for one pack that has yet been invented". It was popularized in the United States in the early 20th century as a result of a story that casino owner Richard A. Canfield had turned it into a gambling game, although it may actually have been Klondike and not Demon that was played at his casino. As a result, it became known as Canfield in the United States, while continuing to be called Demon Patience in the United Kingdom and elsewhere. It is closely related to Klondike, and is one of the most popular games of its type.

== History ==
The game is first recorded in 1891 in England by Mary Whitmore Jones as Demon Patience. She describes it as "by far the best game for one pack that has yet been invented," and goes on to say that its "very uncomplimentary name" seems to derive from its ability to frustrate. "Truly a mocking spirit appears to preside over the game, and snatches success from the player often at the last moment, when it seems just within his grasp." Nevertheless, when the player does succeed in getting the patience out, "it is a triumph to have conquered the demon."

In Henrietta Stannard's 1895 novel, A Magnificent Young Man, Mrs. Bladenbrook invites the curate to "show me this wonderful new game of yours". He fails to get it out declaring, "Ah, it is no use." Mrs. Bladenbrook asks, "But you are nearly done?" "But I am not quite done," replies the curate, "that is where the demon comes in. It is well called 'Demon Patience'. I have often tried a dozen times to do it, and failed each time when it has seemed just within my grasp. Believe me... it is the one form of Patience which puts all the others into the shade; it is the one form of which one never tires; it is always interesting, always fresh, always tantalizing."

A 1910 publication of Fry's Magazine edited by C.B. Fry confirms that the game is called Demon patience "because the player is so often beaten by the awkward position of a single card which avoids any appearance at the critical period in a perverse manner which at times is quite demoniacal."

Meanwhile, Demon had traveled to America, where the earliest description of it, published in the 1907 Hoyle's Games, confusingly calls it Klondike, actually the name of a quite different game. The author of Hoyle's Games acknowledges that there are several ways of playing the game but only describes what he speculates is "probably the original form". However, it is merely a gambling version of Demon in which "the banker sells a pack of 52 cards for $52, and... agrees to pay $5 for every card the player gets down in the 'top line'".

How Demon came to be called Canfield in the US is unclear, but it is frequently linked to noted gambler Richard A. Canfield, who, in 1894, took over the Clubhouse in Saratoga Springs, New York. Some time after 1900, he encouraged gamblers to "buy" a deck of cards. Some sources say the cost was $50, Others say it was $52. The gambler would then play a game of solitaire and earn $5 for every card they managed to place into the foundations; if a player was fortunate enough to place all 52 cards into the foundations, the player would win $2,600. On average players made a loss of about five to six cards per game. Canfield offered it as a novelty but it never really took off. The main reasons were the fact that a single game duration took longer than an average casino game and for every gambler playing a game Canfield needed to hire a croupier. In 1907, Canfield sold the casino to the City of Saratoga Springs "at quite a loss".

Sources differ over precisely which game Canfield actually used. He himself called the game "Klondike", but some of the earliest known rules for Klondike go under the name of Canfield. (Note: Klondike first appears in an English source under the name "Gambler's Delight" in 1905, but then twice in American sources in 1908 as "Canfield".) For example, in 1908, George Hapgood's work contains rules for "Demon Patience", plagiarised from Whitmore Jones and describing what is now called Canfield in America, and rules for "Canfield" which describe what is now called Klondike. Confusion subsequently arose because the name Canfield was transferred in North American circles to the British game of Demon, while Britain followed early American sources in giving the name Canfield to the game now known in America as Klondike. More recently, it has been argued that the game originally played at the casino was in fact Klondike, and not the one known in the US today as Canfield.

== Method of play ==
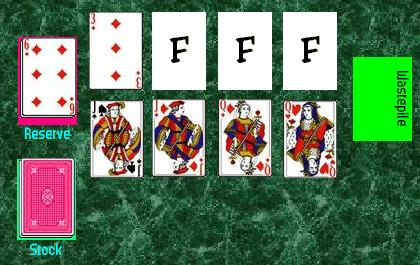
The initial layout in the game of Canfield

To play the game, one must first deal thirteen cards face down into one packet and then turn the top card up. These cards form a reserve called the "demon", the top card of which is available for play. The next card is dealt on the first of a row of four foundations to the right of the reserve. This card is the first foundation card or base card; the remaining three (currently empty) foundations must be started with a card of the same rank as the first foundation card. Finally, one card is dealt to each of four piles which form a row under the foundations. This is the tableau and the cards remaining in the hand form the stock.

Cards on the tableau are packed in descending order and alternating color, turning the corner from Ace to King if need be; while the foundations are built up in suit sequence, wrapping from King to Ace if necessary. Cards from the stock are dealt, in packets of three and face up, to a waste pile. After each packet of three is dealt, the top card of the waste pile is played to a foundation pile or the tableau if possible and in accordance with these rules. The top card of the reserve must be used whenever possible to fill any gaps on the tableau or build on a foundation; in case the reserve is used up, it may be filled from cards from the waste pile. Cards may be moved between tableau piles either individually or as a complete sequence, provided the entire column is moved.

One can make unlimited re-deals as long as there are moves, although Richard Canfield himself restricted the number of times that gamblers could re-deal the stock.

The game is won when all cards are placed in the foundations.

== Variants ==
Some variants of the game include:

- Chameleon, where the reserve only has 12 cards, and there are only three tableau columns. Building in the tableau is down, regardless of suit, and the stock is dealt one at a time with no redeals. All or any cards may be moved from the end of one tableau pile to another.
- Rainbow, in which the tableau builds down regardless of suit. Cards are turned one at a time and no redeals are allowed (in some sources one can deal from the stock one card at a time and two redeals are allowed in this game).
- Selective Canfield, where one can deal five cards right after the reserve is dealt. One can place any one of these five into the foundations and the remaining four cards become the tableau.
- Storehouse (Reserve or Thirteen Up), in which one should remove the deuces (twos) and place them on the foundations. The reserve and the cards on the tableau are then dealt. The stock is dealt one card at a time, and it can be used only twice. Furthermore, the method of building in this game is by suit. The Storehouse variant makes the game easier than Canfield.
- Superior Canfield, where the entire reserve is visible, and gaps can be filled by any card, not just those from the reserve.
- Eagle Wing (Thirteen Down): similar to Storehouse.
- Variegated Demon: double pack game in which Aces are always the base cards and there is a tableau of five cards. Sequences or single cards may be moved and there are two redeals.

Other closely related solitaire games include Duchess and the two-deck game American Toad. Beehive is a much simpler solitaire game that uses a Storehouse layout, but requires players to match cards of the same value, and is geared towards children.

Racing Demon, an English game known as Nerts or Pounce in the US, is a real-time variation of Canfield that enables the game to be played competitively between multiple players. It was the inspiration for the commercially produced Dutch Blitz and Ligretto.

== Solvability ==
Under the standard rules using a three card draw, Canfield cannot be completed successfully very often.

Running a computer solver on 50,000 random Canfield deals has shown that about 71% of all games are winnable. In the average game, 39.9 cards were able to be moved to the foundation. Because the reserve cards are hidden, and because the three-at-a-time dealing of cards from the stock means that cards played early in the game can impact which stock cards are available much later, it is very difficult by normal playing standards to come anywhere near theoretically possible win rates. This would make it plausible for expert-level players to claim win rates of around 35%.

In the Storehouse variant, the maximum possible win rate drops to about 44%. In practice, however, Storehouse is a much easier game to win, likely due to getting all four foundations at the start of the game. Most players will be able to win close to 44% of their games, regardless of skill level, a much higher win rate than is usually achieved by casual players of Canfield.

== Literature ==
- _ (1998), Little Giant Encyclopedia of Games for One or Two, Diagram Group. ISBN 0-8069-0981-1
- Arnold, Peter (2010). The Complete Book of Card Games. Hamlyn Publishing. ISBN 978-0-600-62191-1
- Bathe, N.A.C. (2004). Card & Dice Games. Robert Frederick. ISBN 1-889752-06-1
- Craze, Richard (1995). The Playing Card Kit. Simon & Schuster. ISBN 0-7318-0526-7
- "Devonia" [pseudo. for Mary Whitmore Jones] (1891). "Demon Patience" in Bazaar, Exchange and Mart. 27 April 1891. London: Bradley.
- Fry, C.B. (1910). Fry's Magazine: The Illustrated Monthly of Sport, Travel and Outdoor Life, Vol. 12. G. Newnes.
- Galt, David (1999). 101 Great Card Games, Publications International. ISBN 0-7853-4044-0
- Hapgood, George (1908). "Demon Patience" in Solitaire and Patience. Philadelphia: Penn. pp. 37 ff. "Canfield", actually modern Klondike, is also described on pp. 180 ff.
- Kansil, Joli Quentin, ed. (1999). Bicycle Official Rules of Card Games. ISBN 1-889752-06-1
- Morehead, Philip D., ed. (2001). Hoyle's Rules of Games, 3rd edn. ISBN 0-451-20484-0
- Morehead, Albert and Geoffrey Mott-Smith. (2001). The Complete Book of Solitaire and Patience. Slough: Foulsham.
- Parlett, David (1987). The Penguin Book of Card Games. Treasure Press. ISBN 1-85051-221-3
- Winter, John Strange [pseud. for Henrietta Stannard] (1895). A Magnificent Young Man. Philadelphia: Lippincott.
- Whiter, Barb (2000). The Encyclopedia of Games. Hinkler Books. p. 89. ISBN 9781865152547.
- Whitmore Jones, Mary (1892). Games of Patience for One or More Players. 3rd Series. London: L. Upcott Gill.

== See also ==
- Nerts
- Duchess
- American Toad
- List of solitaires
- Glossary of patience or solitaire terms
