= Brain Battle =

- Presented by: Jason Agnew
- Country of origin: Canada
- No. of episodes: 356

Production
- Running time: 60 minutes
- Production company: Pyman Studios

Original release
- Network: Global
- Release: March 26, 2007 – August 4, 2008

Brain Battle was a Canadian interactive game show, which aired weekdays on Global. The show premiered on March 26, 2007, and aired a total of 356 episodes as of its series finale on August 4, 2008.

== Overview ==
By the end of its run, Brain Battle aired live in all time zones, starting at 11:00 AM EST, running for one hour. Viewers could enter by calling on a premium rate telephone line, sending a text message, or entering on the show's Web site for free. Initially in between calls, a multi-round game was played with 2 in-studio contestants, usually various forms of word puzzles, but in-studio games were later dropped, with the show only consisting of phone-in games after it. The show's staff also maintained a group on Facebook, encouraging users to interact live with the crew of the show.

== Gameplay ==
=== In-studio games ===
Alongside traditional phone-in games, Brain Battle initially used in-studio players in addition to the phone-in games. 2 players competed against each other in 3 rounds of word games.

The rounds were "Chain Word", where players attempted to guess words that were in the middle of a chain between two other words; "Spell it Write", which required the player to guess the correct spelling of a word and "True or False", where players answered true or false questions.

In the final round, Say it Again, the winner from the previous rounds would start with $100, and answer questions for 60 seconds or until they get a total of $1,000. Wrong answers deducted $100, though they could not drop below $100.

=== Home player games ===
From the premiere until mid-July 2007, several home player games have aired per show, usually one "Chain Word", and one "Say It Again" puzzle, but "True Or False" questions and "Spell It Write" puzzles were also used. Starting in mid-July 2007, only one home player game was played since the show was not airing live in all markets. The game could be any aspect of the in-studio games, but is usually a "Chain Word" or a "Say It Again" puzzle. It is announced that a viewer is called the next day to solve the puzzle.

Originally, callers were required to answer a skill-testing question when they called or texted. Later, the skill-testing question was simply the answer to the main game, which meant that the player that is selected would win. Finally, by mid-September, the skill-testing question became the game itself in a way, as now every 10th caller would be added to a pool, each caller being randomly selected. A jackpot game was implemented additionally. Later episodes included "Instant Gratification" prizes, where viewers are called and given a much smaller prize for calling, without playing the Jackpot game on the air.

In September 2007, the jackpot was dropped to $1,000 and within a week finally did away with the jackpot format. The game was changed such that instead of having one or two “Chain Word” and “Say it Again” puzzle per show, there are two or three “Mystery Word” games where the viewer has to fill in the first or second half of a compound word. They provided few clues. The prize was progressive, increasing after every incorrect As well, the show was now airing live in all markets (11:00 a.m. ET) once again, so multiple puzzles and callers per episode returned.

At the end of October 2007, the show became an hour of just home player games, and another format began. In the new format, a category, or a half of a two-part word or phrase is given, with 10 possible answers being on a board (such as for example, ______ Man, or types of cakes). If a player guesses a word that is on the board, the player wins whatever prize is behind it. Sometimes players are given multiple chances to guess, and a player can theoretically win twice on one call. The dollar amounts on the board contained two $50's, two $100's, two $150's, two $200's, a $300, and Jackpot - which would advance the caller to the Jackpot game. In the Jackpot game, the viewer chooses 3 spaces from a computerized lottery ticket style board which consists of 16 spaces. Thirteen of them contain amounts of money, while the other 3 contain dollar signs, which are worth $50. To win the $5,000 jackpot, the viewer must choose the 3 spaces which contain the dollar signs. If the viewer does not pick all three dollar signs, they win only the sum of the three amounts that they chose. Host Jason Agnew will offer the contestant a small cash prize (usually $250) not to play the jackpot game. The top prize for the jackpot game is $5,000, although it has been increased at times, to $6,000, $7,500 and even $10,000. The highest jackpot ever offered was $13,000 (in honor of Friday the 13th) The jackpot game was never won.

A spinoff of Brain Battle called PopQ was aired for a short period on Global's sister network E!, which used Brain Battle's format, but with entertainment themed puzzles.

On August 4, 2008, it was officially announced that Brain Battle would be replaced by a new phone-in show which debuted on the early morning of August 23, 2008, TimeShift Trivia, which would air live at 1:00 AM in every time zone on Friday nights, running for 4 hours in total. However, only 1 hour is aired per time zone, allowing viewers with access to out-of-market Global affiliates to continue watching the show in other time zones. The same staff and host will also work for the new show. The last show was also aired that day.
