= Nerts =

Card game

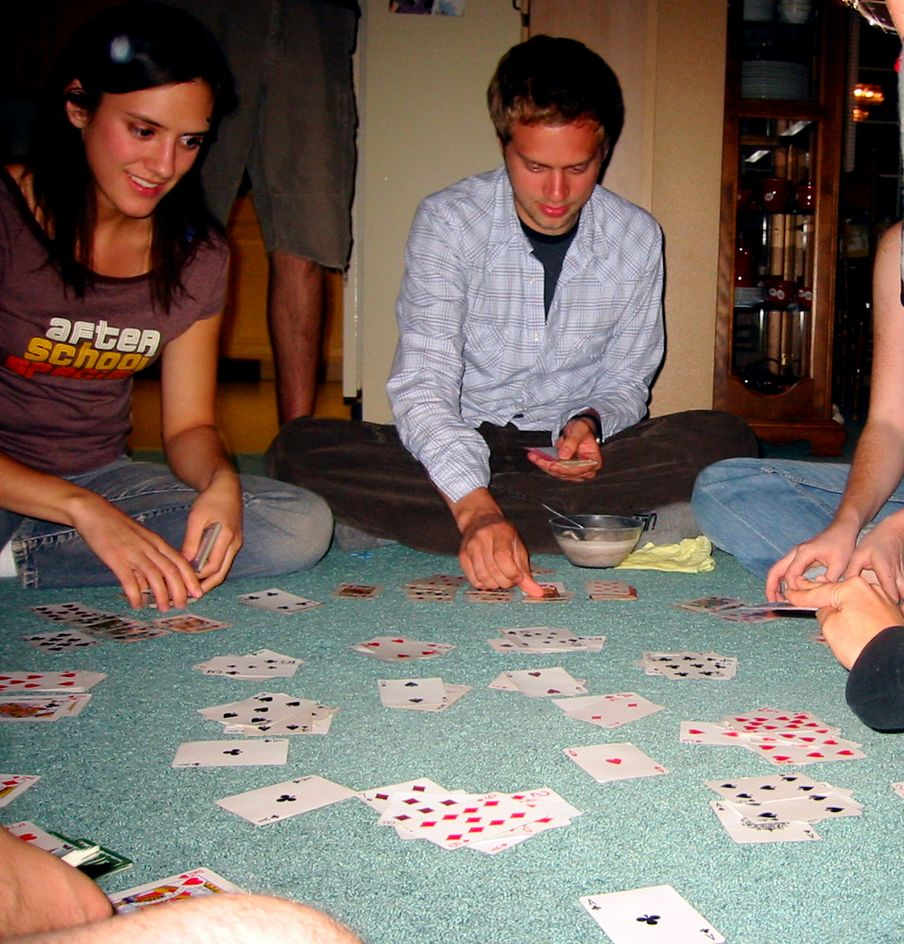
- A game of Nerts
- Alternative name: Pounce; Racing Demon; Peanuts
- Players: Ideally 2–8
- Skills: Quick reaction, awareness of cards being played simultaneously, counting.
- Age range: 8+
- Cards: 52 per deck; each player or team uses a standard playing card deck; each team's deck must be a different design or color from the rest of the decks being used, to identify cards after the round ends

Related games
- Demon, Spit, Dutch Blitz

Nerts (US), or Racing Demon (UK), is a fast-paced multiplayer card game involving multiple decks of playing cards. It is often described as a competitive form of solitaire. In the game, players or teams race to get rid of the cards in their "Nerts pile", their "Demon", by playing them in sequences from aces upwards, either into their personal area or in a communal central area. Each player or team uses their own deck of playing cards throughout the game.

The number of players or teams that can play in a game is limited only by the number of decks and the amount of space available.

== Names ==
The game was invented in England in the 1890s as Racing Demon and is still called by that name in the UK. In the US, it was called Pounce in the 1930s and more recently, Nerts, but the name Racing Demon continues to be used. David Parlett says it is also known as Pounce internationally. The game has other names including: Peanuts, Racing Canfield, Scramble, Squeal, Scrooge, Scrunch, and Nertz.

== History ==
Card game expert David Parlett says the game of Racing Demon is of English origin and was created in the 1890s. It is recorded as Racing Demon in the 1920s and 1930s (Note: For example, in Elizabeth Sprigge's A Shadowy Third and the magazine Punch) with accounts soon afterwards in American publications from 1934 onwards under the name Pounce. In 1927, Robert Hülsemann published a description of the game in German under the name Rasender Teufel ("Racing Demon"). Meanwhile, the American "National Nertz Association" blog says that the association is unaware of any known inventor or specific date of creation for the game and it has been around since the 1940s. Today, proprietary Racing Demon cards are produced, consisting of ordinary 52-card Anglo-American pattern packs with different coloured backs.

== Play ==
A game of Nerts is typically played as a series of hands. Between hands, scores are tallied and the cards are sorted and given back to the players or teams that played them. After the cards are returned, the decks are shuffled and set up for the next hand and the process is repeated until a player wins.

During a hand, players do not take turns. Instead, they play simultaneously, and may play cards onto one another's Lake cards. There are four areas that a player or team uses: the Lake, the River, the Stream, and the Nerts pile. The Lake is the central area, used to score points, which any player or team may use by building suited piles in ascending order without doubles. The River is a 4-columned personal area that a player or team uses by cascading and/or playing cards from columns of alternating color and descending order (like the tableau piles in Solitaire). The Stream is a pile that is continually flipped (usually in groups of three cards at a time) in search of cards to play into the Lake or River. The Nerts pile is a 13-card pile which players try to get rid of cards from one at a time, from the top of the pile, into available Lake or River destinations. The first player or team to successfully get rid of their Nerts pile calls or shouts "Nerts". Once "Nerts" is called all play for that hand stops.

In a hand, players or teams earn points determined by a formula using the number of cards played into the Lake subtracted by twice the number of cards remaining in the Nerts pile. Awarding 10-point bonuses to players or teams that call Nerts is a fairly common practice. Generally a game is played to a set score like 100 points. In that case players will play as many hands as needed until a winner emerges. Sometimes the endgame condition is when the difference between the highest score and the lowest score exceeds some value, such as 100. On occasion, players keep tallies of games won instead of adding hand scores and then use the tallies to determine a winner. It is also common for players or teams to receive negative hand and game scores.

== Pounce ==
Here is a summary of the rules for the similar game Pounce, as described by Breen in 1934: Each player has a shuffled pack of cards. The top 13 are placed face up in front of the player as the 'pounce pile'. Then four cards are placed in a row face up beside it. Players take cards, three at a time, from their remaining stock (the cards left in the hand) and used to build on any Aces in the middle or on the four cards in the row. Cards must be built in alternating color and descending order. Whoever sheds their pounce pile first wins, announcing this by shouting “Pounce!” The winner scores one for every card in the middle of the table and 10 for 'pounce'. Each loser scores one for every card in the centre, but loses two for each card remaining in the pounce pile.

== Organization ==
=== United States ===
In the US the National Nertz Association website has published an "Official Nertz Rulebook". Pagat, the leading card game website, has posted rules for Nerts.

== Commercial versions ==
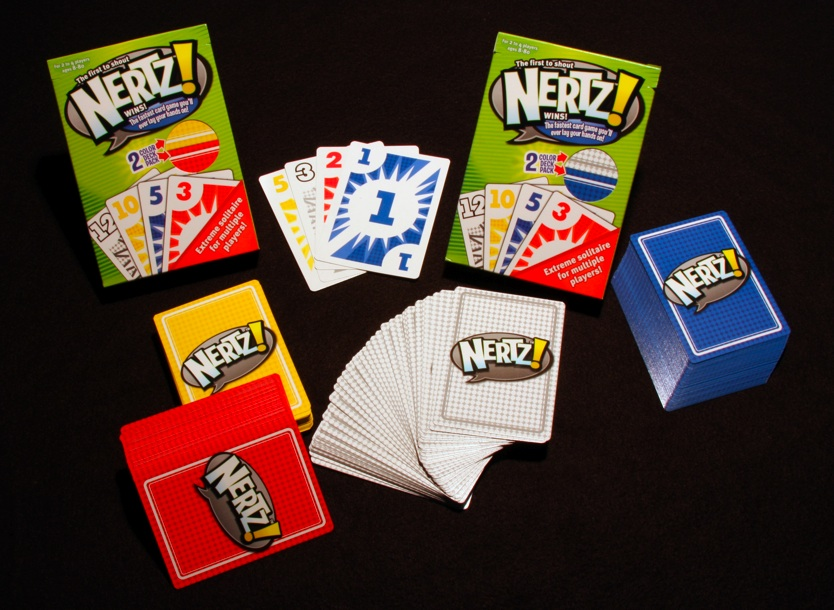
A commercial edition of the game

Nerts-inspired retail game sets include Ligretto, Dutch Blitz, Solitaire Frenzy, Wackee Six, Nay Jay!, Perpetual Commotion,, and Nertz by Bicycle Playing Cards, sharing the same basic elements with some differences.

=== Electronic Nerts ===
The first known electronic Nerts game was Nertz! The Card Game by John Ronnander and Majicsoft for the Atari ST system and was released for purchase in 1995. In January 2021, Zachtronics released a version of Nerts, NERTS! Online, on Steam, which is based on an internal version developed over the previous year.

== See also ==
- Canfield, also known as Demon
- Dutch Blitz, a similar game produced by the Pennsylvania Dutch
- Ligretto, a similar game produced in Germany
- Speed
- Solitaire Showdown, a similar game played online in Windows Live Messenger
- Solitaire terminology, which shares many terms with Nerts
- List of patience and solitaire games

== Literature ==
- Breen, Mary J. (1934). Partners in Play: Recreation for Young Men and Young Women Together. National Recreation Association, A.S. Barnes.
- Hülsemann, Robert (1927). Das Buch der Spiele für Familie und Gesellschaft (1st ed.). Leipzig: Hesse & Becker.
- Parlett, David (2008). The Penguin book of card games. London: Penguin. ISBN 978-0-141-03787-5.
- Sprigge, Elizabeth (1927). A Shadowy Third. Knopf.
- Woodward, Elizabeth (1946); "Multiple Pounce"; in Let's Have a Party; Thomas Y. Crowell; pp. 35–36
- Carlisle, Rodney P. (2009); Encyclopedia of Play in Today's Society, Vol. 1.; California: Sage
- Clegg, Brian and Paul Birch (2002); Crash Course in Creativity; Sterling, Virginia: Kogan Page
