= Kayne Tremills =

Australian television presenter (born 1987)

- Born: 23 January 1987 (age 39); Melbourne, Victoria, Australia
- Occupation: Television presenter
- Years active: 2009–present
- Spouse: Saskia Hampele (2008-present)

Kayne Tremills (born 23 January 1987) is an Australian television presenter best known for his role as a host on Australian children's television programme Studio 3, which was broadcast on ABC3.

== Early life ==
Tremills is from Melbourne. Throughout both primary and high school, he was bullied due to being overweight – an experience that ultimately made him more empathic. He attended Wheelers Hill Secondary College in Victoria and left school in year 11.

== Career ==
Tremills began his television career on Channel 31's live music series 1700 in 2008. The following year, the ABC launched a nationwide campaign, called Me on 3, to find some faces for a new television channel, ABC3. From over 5,000 entrants, Tremills was chosen, alongside Amberley Lobo, to host children's show Studio 3, on which he interviewed celebrity guests including Robin Williams, Mandy Moore, Russell Brand and Justin Bieber.

In 2011, Tremills hosted the Schools Spectacular, an annual Australian youth variety show, together with John Foreman. The show was filmed in front of a sold-out audience at the Sydney Entertainment Centre and aired on the ABC. He drew on his qualifications as a youth worker to present ABC series My Great Big Adventure from 2012, for two seasons.

He hosted two seasons of the Australian version of Splatalot! with Prank Patrol host Scott Tweedie. He also hosted internationally-broadcast award-winning children's adventure series Bushwhacked! for three seasons, alongside Australia star Brandon Walters and later Kamil Elis, where they traversed various locations throughout Australia in an attempt to complete episodic missions.

Tremills hosted coverage of the nationally broadcast Sydney New Year's Eve for two years running. In 2014, he hosted the television special Antarctica: Secrets from the Giant Freezer, filmed in Antarctica. The same year, he became the announcer in the Hits for Kids compilation albums television advertisements from 2014. He was also a cast member and field producer on the 7 Network’s Weekender series.

Tremills hosted a live, unscripted broadcast in the YouTube Space Lab for Live Nation and the BBC. He then secured the lead role of Dr. Septico Yuck in 2017 comedy series Oh Yuck! In 2019, Tremills once again became a presenter, hosting the game show Get It Together! on ABC Me.

Further credits include The New Inventors, Tractor Monkeys, Good Game: Spawn Point, Prank Patrol, You're Skitting Me, Mental As: Saturday Night Crack Up and Catalyst.

== Personal life ==
Tremills is married to actress Saskia Hampele. He is currently based in Sydney.

Tremills was once a youth worker with The Reach Foundation, talking to private schools and working with Victoria’s Department of Human Services with children in care.

== Credits ==
=== Television ===
Year	Title	Role	Notes	Ref.
2008	1700 Live Music Show			
2009	Countdown To 3 (ABC3 Channel Launch Special)		TV special	
2009–2012	Studio 3	Host / Voiceover		
2010	3 on 3			
2010	School’s Spectacular	Co-host	TV special	
2011	My Great Big Adventure	Voiceover	Season 1	
2011	GoodGame SP	Celebrity Guest Host		
2012–2013	Splatalot!	Co-host / Voiceover	Seasons 1–2	
2012–2015	Bushwhacked!	Co-host / Voiceover	Seasons 1–3	
2013	Antarctica: Secrets from the Giant Freezer	Host / Voiceover	TV special	
2013	Tractor Monkeys	Panel Presenter		
2013	Wildcard	Voiceover	Pilot	
2013–2014; 2014–2015	Sydney New Year's Eve	Host	TV special	
2013–2015	Australia Day Smackdown!		TV special	
2014	ABC Splash – Live Online			
2014	My Great Big Adventure		Season 2	
2015	Saturday Night Crack Up			
2015	The Time Capsule			
2015	Crack of Dawn Show			
2015	Passion Project		Web series	
2015	Melbourne Weekender	Host / Voiceover		
2017	Oh Yuck!	Dr. Septico Yuck		
2019	Get It Together!	Host		

=== TVC ===
Year	Title	Role	Notes	Ref.
2009	ABC	Voiceover	TVC	
2013	Trafalgar Tours	Voiceover	TVC	
2013	Melbourne Convention and Exhibition Centre		TVC	
2014	National Science Week		TVC	
2014–present	Hits for Kids compilation albums	Announcer	TVC	

=== Radio ===
Year	Title	Role	Notes	Ref.
2013	Hot FM	Guest Breakfast Show announcer	Austereo	
2014	Mental Health Week	Voiceover / Story Reader	ABC Radio National / Triple J	
2014	ABC Radio	Guest announcer / Panelist (with Waleed Aly)	National ABC	
