= Amberley Lobo =

Australian television presenter (born 1990)

- Born: 30 October 1990 (age 35); Perth, Western Australia, Australia
- Occupation: Television presenter
- Years active: 2007–present
- Career
- Station(s): ABC Me and CBBC
- Website: www.amberleylobo.com

Amberley "Ambo" Lobo (born 30 October 1990) is an Australian television presenter, best known for her role as a host on Australian children's television program Studio 3, which was on ABC 3.

== Early life ==
Lobo was born in Perth, Western Australia, and grew up in South Hedland. Her father is from India and her mother is from New Zealand. Her television career began in 2009 after she was selected from a nationwide search conducted by the ABC. Lobo graduated from Rossmoyne Senior High School in Perth in 2007 and joined the Western Australia Police where she worked as a police cadet. She dropped out of Curtin University after studying journalism for one semester.

== Career ==
In 2009 the ABC launched a nationwide campaign called Me On 3, which was looking for fresh personalities to become the face of a new digital kids channel, ABC3. The competition was entered by over 5,700 people Australia-wide. Entrants had to send in a video audition for the chance to host the new channel. Lobo was selected along with Kayne Tremills to be the face of the station and host its flagship show, Studio 3.

As well as Studio 3 and during her time with the ABC, Lobo also hosted The World Animal Championships alongside Prank Patrol host Scott Tweedie and Wacky World Beaters – which saw her become a daily fixture on Australian TV. She presented coverage of the 2010 Schools Spectacular with Kayne Tremills and musician John Foreman. Lobo has also appeared on an episode of Gardening Australia.

Lobo moved to the UK in 2014 to continue her career in television. She was employed by the BBC and hosted children's programmes. Lobo was the solo host of a music travel show called Pop Slam, which ran for two seasons on CBBC. In each episode, Lobo would pit top bands and singers against each other to find the "greater" pop star. The bands/solo artists included One Direction, Ed Sheeran, Taylor Swift, Cheryl Cole and the Arctic Monkeys. As well as airing in the UK, the show was shown in other countries. Lobo combined hosting that show with continuity presenting for CBBC.

During the 2014 FIFA World Cup, Lobo was a member of the CBBC alternative commentary team alongside Cel Spellman and Hacker T. Dog.

In addition to television, Lobo has been affiliated with Cricket Australia as their youth ambassador. In her work with the organization she has been the face of the Milo In2Cricket kids development program, MCed the KFC T20 Big Bash League, been a member of the commentary team for the live coverage of the Women’s International T20 series, MCed internal stakeholder events, and been a correspondent for both the Allan Border Medal and Ashes Tours. Lobo has also worked for the Melbourne Renegades (boundary riding and vox pops) during the Big Bash season.
