= Takaya Honda =

Australian actor and television presenter

- Born: 6 September 1987 (age 38); Canberra, Australian Capital Territory, Australia
- Education: Barker College; University of Technology Sydney
- Occupations: Actor, television presenter
- Years active: 2009–present
- Spouse: Amy Schwab (m. 2020)
- Children: 1

Takaya Honda (born 6 September 1987) is an Australian actor and television presenter. He is perhaps best known for his roles as Josh in the children's television series A gURLs wURLd, Klaus Thomson in the comedy series The Family Law and David Tanaka in Neighbours. Honda has also presented episodes of My Great Big Adventure and Play School.

== Early and personal life ==
Honda was born in Canberra, but moved to Sydney when he was young. Both of his parents coached gymnastics. His father, Kazuya Honda, was the coach for the Australia women's national gymnastics team. He attended Barker College and graduated in 2005. The following year he briefly attended UNSW College of Fine Arts, studying digital media, before he transferred to the University of Technology Sydney, where he studied a Bachelor of Arts in communication. Honda was a talented junior baseball player and at one stage considered playing at College level in the United States.

Honda became an ambassador for Dementia Australia in 2017. His mother Rhonda was diagnosed with Alzheimer's in 2009 when she was 52 years old. Honda announced the death of his mother in August 2023.

Honda became engaged to his partner Amy Schwab in May 2019, and they married in November 2020. On 31 July 2024, Honda and Schawb confirmed that they were expecting their first child, and their son was born on 20 January 2025.

== Career ==
Honda was invited to perform with the Sport For Jove Theatre Company by its founding member Damien Ryan. It led to him receiving representation within the acting industry. Honda has appeared on the Australian stage in the company's 2009/2010 and 2010/2011 summer festivals of outdoor Shakespeare; The Sydney Hills Shakespeare in the Park, The Leura Shakespeare Festival and The Sydney Morning Herald Autumn of the Arts Shakespeare in the Gardens. He performed as Puck in A Midsummer Night's Dream, Paris in Romeo and Juliet and Dennis and Forester in As You Like It. In 2012 and 2013 he also appeared in the company's critically acclaimed production of Hamlet.

From 2010, Honda began playing Josh in the children's television series A gURLs wURLd. The series was Honda's first audition and first television role. Honda appeared in an episode of The Code in 2014. He also joined the presenting team of ABC3 series My Great Big Adventure, along with Kayne Tremills, Stephanie Bendixsen and Nancy Denis. The following year, he became a presenter on Play School, and appeared in the drama film Skin Deep. In 2016, Honda joined the cast of The Family Law as Klaus Thomson. Honda was part of the ensemble cast that won two Equity Ensemble Awards. In 2017, he appeared in Lincoln Hall's comedy drama film Naked Strangers. He also starred in Peter William Francis' short film Boyz filmed in Kurnell.

Honda also joined the main cast of long-running soap opera Neighbours as David Tanaka in 2016. He made his first appearance on 21 September 2016. Alongside Matt Wilson, Honda was part of the first same-sex marriage in an Australian television series since being legalised in Australia in 2017. The wedding episode aired on 3 September 2018. Honda told producers that he planned to leave Neighbours in 2021 in order to pursue new acting roles, but he stayed on until 2022 when the serial was cancelled. He was asked to return to finish off David's story when Neighbours was revived in 2023, which he agreed to do. His character was killed-off during the episode released on 1 February 2024, after producers realised that it was the only way David would ever leave his family.

In December 2022, Honda signed on to star in Joy Hopwood's romantic comedy film The Gift That Gives, alongside Lily Brown-Griffiths, HaiHa Le, and Damien Sato. Released in 2023, The Gift That Gives won Best Film at the New York International Women's Film Festival.

In December 2025, Honda and Matt Wilson began a podcast called Bin Night with Tak and Matty in which they began interviewing their former Neighbours co-stars. However, Wilson left the show after 18 episodes because of family commitments, with Honda continuing with the podcast.

== Filmography ==
Year	Title	Role	Notes
2010–2011	A gURLs wURLd	Josh	Supporting role
2014	The Code	Jase	Episode: "#1.3"
2014–2015	My Great Big Adventure	Himself (host)	10 episodes
2015	Skin Deep	David	
2015–2023	Play School	Himself (host)	
2016–2019	The Family Law	Klaus Thomson	Recurring; 15 episodes
2016	Road Trip	David Tanaka	Web series
2016–2024	Neighbours	David Tanaka	Main cast
2017	Neighbours vs Time Travel	David Tanaka	Web series
2017	Naked Strangers	Alex	
2017	Boyz	Julian	Short film
2023	The Gift That Gives	Callum Mori	
