= Rush TV (TV series) =

- Presented by: Hannah Wang; Mitchell Tomlinson
- Country of origin: Australia
- No. of seasons: 2
- No. of episodes: 107

Production
- Production company: Beyond Television Productions

Original release
- Network: ABC3
- Release: 5 December 2009 – 27 October 2013

Rush TV is an Australian children's television series which focused on music, fashion and sports. The show was produced by Beyond Television Productions for the Australian Broadcasting Corporation's children's channel ABC3, which aired from December 2009 until October 2013. The show featured two main hosts Hannah Wang and Mitchell Tomlinson.

== Format ==
Hannah Wang and Mitchell Tomlinson reported on different sporting events and explored the fusion between sport and music, fashion and the arts. She interviewed the athletes as they shared their tips, favourite sporting locations and 'inside' information. They also reported on the latest in action sports.

== Seasons ==
The first season premiered on 5 December 2009 on ABC3 and the final episode aired on 27 November 2010.

The second season premiered on 7 October 2012 on ABC3 and the final episode aired on 27 October 2013.

Despite the final episode airing in October 2013, repeats continued to air until 1 January 2015.

== Production ==
The show was announced as a local sports show for the new children's channel ABC3, produced by Beyond Television Productions in Sydney. Auditions for the show were held online called Me On ABC3. Over 5000 auditions were sent in and six hosting roles were announced. The Rush TV hosts were announced as Hannah Wang and Mitchell Tomlinson.

== Reception ==
In a 2010 review, Nick Galvin of The Sydney Morning Herald wrote, "Judging by Rush TV, it's all about being a whole lot cooler than any of us who grew up way back in the 20th century. The Australian-made show is a series of high-energy sports videos, none longer than about three minutes, backed by pumping music. But just don't expect to see any of that old-fashioned cricket or football stuff. ... My only quarrel (again, based on a single episode) is an absence of female participants." In a positive 2010 review, The Sunday Age wrote, "Sometimes, less is more. And this high-octane young persons' series proves it. Brief linking segments leave plenty of room for startling footage of skateboarding, surfing, skiing and extreme BMX action. Cool", with a 3.5 star rating.

== See also ==
- Studio 3
- ABC Me
