= What do you know? =

What do you know? or variations may refer to:

- Whad'Ya Know?, an American comedy, interview, and quiz radio show syndicated on Public Radio International
- What Do You Know?, a BBC Radio quiz show with a segment that later became the show Brain of Britain
- What Do You Know? (TV series), an Australian children's TV programme

== See also ==
- What Do You Know, Deutschland?, a 1986 album by KMFDM
- What You Know (disambiguation)
