= List of Prank Patrol (Australian TV series) episodes =

Episodes of Australian children's television programme

The following is an episode list for the Australian television series Prank Patrol, a children's television programme on ABC3.

== Summary ==
Series	Episodes	Originally released	
Series	Episodes	First released	Last released
1	26	4 December 2009	12 January 2010
2	38	19 September 2011	23 November 2012
3	26	16 September 2013	14 October 2013

== Series 1 (2009–10) ==
No.	Title	Original release date
1	"Superglove"	4 December 2009
Prankster Mitchell shows friends a special glove that gives him powers, they visit a special FX studio where they put together the objects needed to pull off the Prank. Prankster: Mitchell Targets: Nico, Alex & Felix
2	"Secret Admirer"	7 December 2009
Prankster Rowan wants to prank his neighbour Tate by making him believe he has a secret admirer, however things get freaky after the secret admirer has a t-shirt with Tate's photo on it. Prankster: Rowan Target: Tate
3	"Celebrity Car Wash"	8 December 2009
Prankster Maddison asks her best friend Tanisha to join her for a charity car wash. They then knock the bumper off a celebrity's car. Prankster: Maddison Target: Tanisha
4	"Mad Dentist"	9 December 2009
Prankster Daisy wants to prank her little brother Monty, she makes him go to the craziest, smelliest dentist ever, things get really scary when the dentist has very strange tools. Prankster: Daisy Target: Monty
5	"Rap Star"	10 December 2009
Prankster Jayme-Lee fools her cousins into believing she became a megastar overnight and wants her cousins to be in her music video. Prankster: Jayme-Lee Target: Jasmine
6	"Video Games Come Alive"	11 December 2009
Prankster Ronn wants to prank his friend Joel who always brags about his video game skills, however, how will Joel react when the game comes to life. Prankster: Ronn Target: Joel
7	"Exercise Chef"	14 December 2009
Mim pranks her friend Alley at a cooking class, but they have a chef who crushes tomatoes with his feet. Prankster: Mim Target: Alley
8	"Ghost Hunters"	15 December 2009
Hayley pranks her friend Lucy who is obsessed with everything supernatural, when Hayley makes her friend Lucy audition for a play at a haunted theatre, where there may be a ghost. Prankster: Hayley Target: Lucy
9	"Karate Kid"	16 December 2009
Prankster Jackson wants to prank his martial arts classmates to show them he is the best at martial arts. He mixes up a special ‘energy drink’ which will give him super strength. Prankster: Jackson Target: Martial arts classmates
10	"Shopaholic Granny"	17 December 2009
Two Prankster sisters Ashlee and Chloe ask Prank Patrol to help them fool their granny into thinking she has a shoplifting twin that is getting her into loads of trouble. Pranksters: Ashlee & Chloe Target:
11	"The Wrestler"	18 December 2009
Prankster Christian wants to prank his friend Rocco who is a fan of wrestling. His plan is to fight two wrestling professionals and win. Prankster: Christian Target: Rocco
12	"Rigged Restaurant"	21 December 2009
Prankster Lexi loves dining out with her two girlfriends, Jazz and Mia. She pranks them by taking them out to the strangest restaurant they have ever seen. Prankster: Lexi Targets: Jazz & Mia
13	"Spy Kid"	22 December 2009
Prankster Harry asks the Prank Patrol to make it as he is a world famous criminal who is wanted by the police and so is his friend. Prankster: Harry Target:
14	"Boyfriend Makeover"	23 December 2009
Prankster Alicia wants to prank her overprotective dad. Her plan is to show off her new boyfriend he will not soon forget. Prankster: Alicia Target:
15	"Lousy Laundry"	24 December 2009
Prankster Oakley wants to prank her cousin Danielle. She then causes havoc in a lousy laundry store where the service goes horribly wrong. Prankster: Oakley Target: Danielle
16	"Bowling Madness"	28 December 2009
Prankster Mitchell wins two passes to a bowling alley and takes his best mate Aaron along for an innocent game but every time they bowl the pins explodes and the ball gets stuck. Prankster: Mitchell Target: Aaron
17	"Motorpsycho"	29 December 2009
Prankster Oscar has a friend, Aiden, who is crazy about motorcycles. So they are offered a job working at a bike store, they say yes immediately. They soon regret it when they are put in charge of cleaning an expensive superbike. Prankster: Oscar Target: Aiden
18	"Ghost"	30 December 2009
Prankster Remi tricks her friend Bridie into believing they are getting a book from a haunted library. Prankster: Remi Target: Bridie
19	"Dinosaur Alive"	31 December 2009
Joel wants to prank his friend by taking Jack on a bird watching expedition, only to see a real-life dinosaur on the move. Prankster: Joel Target: Jack
20	"Internet Crash"	4 January 2010
Prankster Brikelle tricks a few of her classmates into thinking they’ve broken the world’s internet after Brikelle stumbles onto a government website. Prankster: Brikelle Targets:
21	"Game Show"	5 January 2010
Prankster Lucas rigs a new TV game show so there is no way the person being pranked can win. Prankster: Lucas Target:
22	"Muscle Mania"	6 January 2010
Prankster Thomas and his friend Marcus both love stay fit, however Marcus is taller and stronger than him, so Thomas asks the Prank Patrol to build an ultra fit muscle machine. Prankster: Thomas Target: Marcus
23	"Freaky Fortunes"	7 January 2010
Nina pranks her friend Summer to go work at a bakery, everything goes alright until the fortunes in the cookies come true. Prankster: Nina Target: Summer
24	"Aliens Have Landed"	8 January 2010
Jock wants to trick his friends, Lachlan and Alex, into believing there is an alien in his backyard. Prankster: Jock Targets: Lachlan & Alex
25	"Superstar"	11 January 2010
Prankster Nicoletta pranks her friend Bec by pretending she is secretly a famous pop star by night and student by day. Prankster: Nicoletta Target: Bec
26	"The Best Of Prank Patrol"	12 January 2010
Scotty tries to play a prank on the Ninjas so he watches all the pranks he has helped execute to get inspiration. Prankster: Scotty Target: Ninjas

== Series 2 (2012–13) ==
No. overall	No. in season	Title	Original release date
27	1	"Extreme Stunt Driver"	2 July 2012
Prankster: Patrick Target: Tim
28	2	"Rodent's Revenge"	3 July 2012
Prankster: Jess Target: Chelsea
29	3	"Runaway Robot"	4 July 2012
Prankster: William Targets: Abdirahman & Abdullahi
30	4	"Cleaning Calamity"	5 July 2012
Prankster: Leila Target: Zoe
31	5	"Mind Control"	6 July 2012
Prankster: Troy Target: Willow
32	6	"Lollipop Laboratory"	9 July 2012
Pranksters: Ella & Juliette Target: Rose
33	7	"Silly Soccer"	10 July 2012
Prankster: Aaron Target: Tyson
34	8	"Dog Wash Disaster"	11 July 2012
Prankster: Bronte Target: Olivia
35	9	"Bollywood Heiress"	12 July 2012
Prankster: Madison Target: Isabella
36	10	"Rock Rebellion"	13 July 2012
Prankster: Rahart Target: Adam (Rahart's father)
37	11	"Magic Show"	16 July 2012
Prankster: Natasha Target: Samantha
38	12	"Superdad"	17 July 2012
Prankster: Brian Targets: Henry & Lola
39	13	"Host for a Day"	18 July 2012
Prankster: Pip Target: Miki
40	14	"Genius Gorilla"	19 July 2012
Prankster: Daniel Target: Zach
41	15	"Wacky Wedding"	20 July 2012
Prankster: Daniella Target: Deniz
42	16	"Creepy Cloning"	23 July 2012
Prankster: Liam Target: Lily
43	17	"Rockstar Restaurant"	24 July 2012
Prankster: Lulu Target: Charlotte
44	18	"Courier Chaos"	25 July 2012
Prankster: Tristan Target: Kara
45	19	"Soft Drink Musical"	26 July 2012
Prankster: Stevie-Lou Target: Georgia
46	20	"Magic Guitar"	27 July 2012
Prankster: Spencer Target: Joel
47	21	"Dance Class Debacle"	6 August 2012
Prankster: Merisa Target: Brooke
48	22	"Radioactive Rumble"	7 August 2012
Prankster: Shayden Target: Lachie
49	23	"Dino Egg"	8 August 2012
Prankster: Darcy Target: Lachlan
50	24	"The Big Bust Out"	9 August 2012
Prankster: Jason Target: Jordan
51	25	"Icky Feet"	10 August 2012
Prankster: Dana Target: Jasmine
52	26	"Talkshow Trouble"	10 September 2012
Pranksters: Sheridan & Lauren Target: Taylor
53	27	"Haunted House"	11 February 2013
Prankster: Mia Targets: Chelsea & Eugenie
54	28	"Movie Madness"	12 February 2013
Pranksters: Mateuse & Savannah Target: Jacob
54	29	"Dream Machine"	13 February 2013
Prankster: Olivia Target: Demi
55	30	"Computer Mayhem"	14 February 2013
Prankster: Liam Target: Dylan
56	31	"Space Disaster"	15 February 2013
Prankster: Chantal Target: Isabella
57	32	"Tentacles of Terror"	11 March 2013
Prankster: Luke Target: Tom
58	33	"Mission Invisible"	12 March 2013
Prankster: Olivia Target: Bethany
59	34	"Digital Detention"	13 March 2013
Prankster: Ben Targets: Hugo, Isaac, Dion & Sham
60	35	"Bunyip Hunters"	14 March 2013
Prankster: Jonty Targets: Corey & Ben
61	36	"Shark Shenanigans"	15 March 2013
Prankster: Darcy Target: Ashleigh
62	37	"Prank Party Practical Joke"	16 March 2013
Prankster: Brylee Target: Brooke
63	38	"Best Of"	17 March 2013
Prankster: Target:

== Series 3: Prank Patrol Road Trip (2013) ==
No. overall	No. in season	Title	Original release date
