= You're Skitting Me =

- Genre: Comedy; Satire; Surreal humour Sketch comedy
- Developed by: Jigsaw Entertainment
- Directed by: David Cartel
- Starring: Rowan Hills; Hayden McKertish; Molly Daniels; Mia Albers; Cosmo Renfree; Jake Fehily; Moya Zhang; Branford Gruar; Isabelle Richardson; Freddie Young; Mim Micheloudakis; Edward Gates
- Country of origin: Australia
- Original language: English
- No. of seasons: 3
- No. of episodes: 26

Production
- Executive producers: Simon Hopkinson; Nick Murray; Bernadette O'Mahony
- Running time: 25 minutes (series 1 – 2), 12 minutes (series 3)
- Production company: Jigsaw Entertainment

Original release
- Network: ABC ME
- Release: 29 February 2012 – 2016

You're Skitting Me is an Australian children's sketch comedy series that began airing on 29 February 2012 on ABC3. The cast consists of six teen actors who make up the main cast, as well as another six teens who make up the additional cast, who together perform numerous sketches or "skits". The show is composed of numerous short segments per episode, and pokes fun at and parodies many subjects and themes, such as TV shows, movies and cultural stereotypes, as well as controversial issues such as global warming. Twenty-six episodes have been produced by Jigsaw Entertainment. The name of the series is a play on the phrase "You're Kidding Me".

The second series aired from 27 September to 9 October 2013. The third series began airing on 19 September 2016, when ABC3 rebranded as ABC ME. It features five new actors, as well as three featured from Series 2.

== Cast ==
=== Main cast ===
Cast Member	Regular Characters
Rowan Hills	(Introduced in Series One): Inappropriate Joe, Edward Cullen, Computer-Savvy Homeless Man, Joel Thomas (Crisis Video Blogger), Luigi, Ding Dong (Yay Team), Henry (Extreme Puddle Jumper Co-host), Zed the Zombie, Jim Withers (Jolimont High Witness News Reporter), Ross Anderson (Jolimont High Witness News Reporter), Emo #2 (Tony the Cheerful Emo), Caveman Stoink, Ahfrin the Viking (Introduced in Series Two): The Doctor, Slugger Steve, Recyclo, Moose (Ghost Roasters), Agent 4 (Teen Spy Force), Herman the Convict, Superboy, Roman boy
Hayden McKertish	(Introduced in Series One): Travis Coyne (Jolimont High Witness News Co-Anchor), Uncle Vijay, Caveman Ogg, Robert (Yay Team), Go Mad Ad Voiceover Guy, Mario, Australia's Next Big Talent Indian Judge, Billy the Criticising Nerd, Ed (Joel's Best Friend), Hipster #2, "@traviswatts04" (Internet Speak Girl's Friend), Harkon the Viking, Emo #1 (Tony the Cheerful Emo) (Introduced in Series Two): Damian the "Trust me I've done First-Aid" Guy, Dylan (Ghost Roasters), Brian the Convict, Male Grammar Police Officer, Andy's Boss, Thompson (Slugger Steve's Victim), Roman Boy
Molly Daniels	(Introduced in Series One): Jenny Hills (Jolimont High Witness News Co-Anchor), Scary Girl Guide #2, Heather the Internet Speak Girl, Zing Zo (Yay Team), Australia's Next Big Talent Overemotional Judge, Jill (Extreme Puddle Jumper Co-host), Scary Mum's Daughter, Polly (Daughter telling off parents), Emma/Plinkus the Penguin (Tatiana), Emo Girl (Tony the Cheerful Emo), Gerlot the Viking, Cave Girl Goink (Introduced in Series Two): Wonder-Girl, Female Grammar Police Officer, Roman Girl
Mia Albers	(Introduced in Series One): Tatiana "Tats" Johnston, Scary Girl Guide #1, Bella Swan, Ruby Rudd (Jolimont High Witness News Lead Field Reporter), Maeve Blairs (OH&S Committee Prefect), Zi Zou (Yay Team), Australia's Next Big Talent Blonde Judge, "@tamarajadebear" (Internet Speak Girl's Friend), Karf the Viking, Cave Girl Urr (Introduced in Series Two): Cat-Girl, Susan the Doctor's Companion, Roman Girl
Cosmo "Cossy" Renfree	(Introduced in Series One): Zack the Zombie, Hipster Bowman, Caveman Krunk, Voldemort, Tony the Cheerful Emo, Scary Mum, Ping Pong (Yay Team), Harvey Crane (Jolimont High Witness News Field Reporter), Lucas Blackmore (Jolimont High Witness News Field Reporter), Roman the Viking, Regular Australia's Next Big Talent Contestant (Nervous Flatulent Contestant, '2 unicycles' riding contestant) (Introduced in Series Two): DJ Wicky, Ryan the Werewolf, Roman Boy
Jake Fehily	(Introduced in Series One): Bear Cub/Jeremy, The Inspiring Actor, Helmet Boy, Luke (Son telling off parents), Regular Voldemort Victim/Inviter (Tennis Referee, Car Buyer), Unnamed Viking Student, Various students who are subjects of Jolimont High Witness News Reports (Ricky the Bicycle Accident Victim, David the Student in Detention, Student who got bullied by Rory Bentley, Jolimont High Witness News 'Helicopter'), Regular Australia's Next Big Talent Contestant (Mime Contestant, Magician Contestant, Vegetable Chopping Contestant) (Introduced Series Two): Gollum, Wolverine-Kid, Andy, Hulk, "P" (Teen Spy Force)

The second series features the previously unlisted additional cast members in the opening sequence and in behind the scenes interviews with cast members (such as Moya Zhang and Branford Gruar), as well as completely new cast members Isabella Richardson, Freddie Young, Edward Gates, and Mim Micheloudakis.

=== Additional cast ===
- Moya Zhang
- Branford Gruar
- Isabella "Issy" Richardson
- Freddie Young
- Emily "Mim" Micheloudakis
- Edward Gates

== Regular sketches ==
Several sketches take place in the fictional Jolimont High School, including; Jolimont High Witness News, OH&S Committee Prefect, and "Check out that Kid"

=== Introduced in Series One ===
- Uncle Vijay: Uncle Vijay is an elderly, Indian man who sits on the couch watching TV while ranting at the things he sees on the screen. Many cultural references are made through the various shows he watches, including; Doctor Who, Glee, The Big Bang Theory, Wheel of Fortune and even the show itself. Many of the shows he gives commentary on, foreshadows a sketch the cast will later perform. Hayden once explained that the character of Uncle Vijay was inspired by his grandfather who has a tendency to get verbal with the TV. Since series 2 his design has slightly changed, his hair now features locks that stick upwards and his segment transition is now accompanied with traditional Indian Music. This is one of the most frequent appearing sketches in both series.
- Zombie Kids: Zack and Zed are zombie students who try to function in society whilst succumbing to their urges of consuming brains. However the rest of society treat them as if they're perfectly normal, and view their "zombie behaviour" more as an annoyance. They also enjoy making "brains" puns. There is a running gag of the zombies being viewed as a social or racial group, and in one episode they find society's stereotypical view of zombies as being offensive. They return in Series 2 with their segment now transitioning with Creepy Music.
- The Hipsters: Hipsters occasionally accompanied by other cast members, refuse to conform to societal norms in an attempt to stand out even if it means extreme inconvenience, discomfort and sometimes even risk to personal safety. So far only "Bowman" (the Hipster played by Cosmo) has been named. In Series 2 they have developed a new tendency where they will admire some form of "modern art", which turns out to be something which isn't even vaguely intended-art (such as a diamond shaped yellow sign, or a scrunched up ball of paper).
- Scary Girl Guides: Two creepy Girl Scout Guides go around the neighbourhood carrying out their girl guide duties but always end up terrorising civilians; from providing meals on wheels of disgusting leftover food, washing cars that are completely clean because they "might get dirty", kidnapping an old lady's dog so they would have a missing dog to find, and even blackmailing people into having them help. They return in Series 2 with freckles and longer eyelashes.
- The Cavemen: A caveman named Krunk makes consistent attempts to civilise his fellow cavemen, with ideas of modern technology from paper, to soap, to social networking, but his attempt are always futile as his fellow caveman Ogg always ends up rejecting his ideas comically stating that they will never catch on (despite all of them existing in today's society).
- Twilight Oz Style: A parody of The Twilight Saga where Bella and Edward reenact various scenes but comically 'Australianise' them, for example when Bella realises what Edward truly is, instead of being a vampire he turns out to be a bogan.
- Jolimont High Witness News: A news satire segment which portrays "High School versions" of typical news events, such as a serious bike accident, school bullies, or school lunch trade market. This segment features all of the cast, anchored by Travis Coyne and Jenny Hills, Ruby Rudd as a lead field reporter and other cast members in varying roles of reporters and/or interviewees.
- Tatiana's Solo Round the World Trip: A parody of Jessica Watson's solo sail trip around the world. Tatania, who "[her] friends like to call "Tats"" sets off on a solo sail around the world, despite not knowing a thing about sailing and attempting the trip solely for fame. She did not even initially know what the word "solo" meant and attempted to bring her best friend Em along, later she manages to bring her by disguising her as a "penguin" named Plinkus.
- Inappropriate Joe: Joe has a tendency to respond to other people's comments and actions the exact opposite to what society expects. Rowan describes Joe as being the voice in your head that thinks "Wouldn't it be funny if I did that?", but in Joe's case he actually goes ahead and does it. When asked whether he thought he was like Inappropriate Joe, Rowan said "I would say no, but would also say yes, in that there's a bit of Inappropriate Joe in everyone."
- Go Mad Advertisement: The show quite often displays mock ads for fictional products such as; Contagious Disease which helps to get rid of other people (such as being in a line), or Barf in a Bag which ingestible fake vomit that allows easy escape from exams. The ads always end in a warning, usually a potential health hazard from the product; such as Barf in a Bag causing real barf. The ads' voiceover is done by Hayden.
- Boy vs. Boredom with Bear Cub: A parody of Man vs. Wild; Jeremy, who goes by the name "Bear Cub" (after Bear Grylls), is a boy cursed with the worst cases of boredom, and gives informative videos showing his attempts to "survive" these situations, through use of exaggerated, "extreme survival" methods, parodying methods used by Bear Grylls.
- Yay Team: A parody of The A-Team and Power Rangers where an elite team all with special powers attempt to fix ordinary problems in everyday life. The team consists of Ping Pong (Cosmo) with the power of a leopard, Zing Zo (Molly) with the power of a bat, Ding Dong (Rowan) with the power of a duck, Zi Zou (Mia) with the power of a cake, and Robert (Hayden) who is the only one with no powers and is the clear outcast of the group resorting to "normal methods" to accomplish things.
- Internet Speak Girl: A girl named Heather who uses texting and internet language when talking in real life as if she's on Facebook or Twitter, despite her friends continuous requests for her to talk normally.
- Viking High: A High School for Viking Students (played by all cast members) and a teacher who struggles to educate them to be civilised in contrast to their accustomed Viking habits of "stabbing and burning".
- Extreme Puddle Jumping: A parody of various "Extreme Sports" presented by Henry and Jill along with various other cast members in trying to promote Puddle Jumping as the new extreme sport, portraying it as being mockingly dangerous.
- The Inspiring Actor: A young man walks into stores, misled by the stores name such as "Opportunity" and "Convenience", that he is able to forward his ambition to be an actor. Always giving a heartfelt performance to the store owner, he leaves them confused, annoyed or touched.
- Mario and Luigi: Mario and Luigi having continuous, comical disputes, quite often about their careers as either plumbers or video game characters.
- Australia's Next Big Talent: A parody of Australia's Got Talent, featuring Molly, Hayden, Mia and Branford as judges, and other cast members as reoccurring contestants. In particular, Molly's character who is an over emotional judge who has a habit of crying has a reoccurring catchphrase of "I almost wet myself".
- Scary Mum: A girl invites her friends over, but end up meeting her kind, but horrifically looking, Mum. However she can never understand why her friends scream in terror or throw up.
- OH&S Committee Prefect Announcement: Maeve Blairs an OH&S Committee Prefect attempts to announce the implementations of new school policies, but is prone to random attacks from students usually in the form of being continuously knocked over mid-speech.
- "You had to invite Voldemort?": Voldemort gets invited by some of his friends to a normal social even but always ends up spoiling it by killing someone (Jake being a regular victim or Voldemort inviter), where one of his friends will say the catchphrase "You had to invite Voldemort?", sometimes phrased as "You had to bring Voldemort"
- Cheerful Emo: An emo named Tony who is always happy with life and just 'doesn't get it' when he tries to hang out with his emo friends (Hayden, Molly and Rowan).
- Kids telling off parents: The roles have been switched with Luke and Polly giving talks to their parents on how to properly behave.
- Joel the Crisis Video Blogger: Joel Thomas and his best friend Ed create a series of crisis video blogs where the 'crisis' is some insignificant technological inconvenience such as: the mystery of Joel's apparent invisible Facebook Profile where no one 'likes' or 'comments' his status updates, or extreme survival methods due to a few hours of the internet being cut at his house.
- "Check out the new kid": Various cast members will notice a new kid with the phrase "Check out the new kid" and will comment about some seeming metaphoric description about them, but the metaphoric description always comically turns out to be literal. Examples include a new kid who is "sick" will be shown hurling into a bucket, or a guy who is "smoking hot" will have smoke rising from him with comments that it is hot. Sometimes the kid isn't new.
- Helmet Boy Rides Again: Helmet Boy is a boy who suffers from chronic clumsiness causing him to be unable to travel from location to another without falling over and crashing into objects along the way, hence he dons a helmet to protect himself from injury.
- Billy the Criticising Nerd: a bespectacled nerdling who delights in pointing out faults and technicalities in every day situations, to the annoyance of whoever he is talking to.
- YSM Spelling Bee: All of the cast members take in turn over the series to spell words at a spelling bee, with the words being childish, immature or rude. It is revealed at some point that the reason for this is because Molly and Rowan were the ones who 'organised' the spelling bee. This is often expanded so that the actual cast members get a real life spelling bee with real difficult words, where they will comically misspell the words and make up meanings.
- The Adventures of Vomit Boy: An animated segment which stars George Clooney as superhero Vomit Boy (voiced by Cosmo) and Kanye West (voiced by Jake) as his faithful assistant Kanye. Vomit Boy's superpower is the ability to hurl excessively which he utilises in many creative ways to save people.
- Ned the Panda: An animated segment narrated by Molly featuring a Panda named Ned who inadvertently ends up in fatal situations which act as morals to the story.
- Turning Clown Heads: An animated segment with two Turning Clown Heads (voiced by Hayden and Cosmo) that swallow balls, talking and complaining to each other, especially about their lack of control over their head movements.
- Rex the Dinosaur: An animated segment narrated by Rowan, featuring a dinosaur name Rex, it parodies typical educational short animations where a child in a social situation will learn a moral. It always ends in "... and then Rex ate them, because Rex was a Tyrannosaurus Rex."
- The Tomatoes: An animated segment featuring two anthropomorphic tomato roommates named Barry (seems to be shared role between Hayden and Rowan) and Chuck (Cosmo). Chuck has a tendency to pronounce words 'unaustralianly' (reminiscent of that of an American accent), which drives Barry insane and prompts him to inflict injury on Chuck.

=== Introduced in Series Two ===
- Super School: Takes a look at what Superheroes were like back when they were young and attended school. Features; Batboy, Superboy, Wonder Girl, Spider-Boy, Wolverine-Kid, Cat-Girl and Hulk. In later episodes, it appears the school is no longer exclusive to heroes as Lex Luthor transfers from Evil Villain High, where he was immediately bullied by all the hero students, and Dark Knight Rises' Bane is also present where the teacher has trouble understanding him due to his mask. This segment somewhat replaces Viking High, and is filmed in the same location.
- Gollum at School: Gollum, attempts to function at school, complete with his strange habits of conversing with himself, and weighing the conversers fate of life and death, in front of them, and his disgusting habits of eating.
- If Life was Like a Computer Game: Various cast members act out scenes of what it would be like of video game mechanics existed in the real world, such as being "low health" being restored to normal by eating and health power-ups, glitchy game system of walking into walls, or changing the difficulty level in the classroom.
- Doctor Who Downunder: A parody of Doctor Who, where the Doctor's new regeneration is that of a teenaged Australian bogan. This teenage bogan incarnation of the Doctor, is very childish (most likely parodying the Eleventh Doctor), incompetent, has a thrill for life-threatening danger, and possesses many stereotypical Australian characters, to the annoyance of his companion Susan (a British Girl who is a parody of a stereotypical Doctor companion, most likely Rose Tyler). It pokes fun at the many antiques and themes of the show; such as the Doctor's ability to regenerate causing this Doctor to having no fear of death and taking life for granted (and forgetting this isn't the case for his companion). This Doctor wears a scarf (like the Fourth Doctor), carries a walking stick (like the First Doctor), wears a checked shirt (most likely referencing the Sixth Doctor) and has a hairstyle similar to the Eighth Doctor). The bogan Doctor causes many of his possessions to be damaged or lost, causing him to replace them with Australian-ised variations, such as replacing the TARDIS with the TARBIS (Time And Relative dimension Bike in Space) after he crashes the TARDIS in a drag race, as well as replacing the Sonic Screwdriver with a "Sonic Sausage-roll" which the bogan Doctor inevitably eats. Some Doctor Who monsters also appear or are mentioned including a Dalek, the Sontarans and a Slitheen. This segment is very similar to First Series' Twilight Oz Style as they both parody and Australian-ise a foreign fictional media, with even the same cast members being used (Rowan and Mia).
- Slugger Steve the Confused Bully: Slugger Steve is the School's Resident Bully, only thing is he has a habit of misunderstanding what common methods of bullying actually involve, often resulting in a seemingly menacing threat being an (unintentional) act of kindness, or a figurative description of bullying being taken literally. An example includes; taking homework off another student, and upon finding it is wrong he tells him to meet him behind the shed, which turns out to be Steve tutoring the student on his errors. Slugger Steve's favourite "victim" is Thompson.
- The Romans: A similar sketch to the Caveman, only the time period has shifted forward a few millennia. In ancient Rome, a group of Roman children constantly have various members of their group come up with ideas of modernisation (that are present in current society) such as ideas for items and ways to improve their lifestyle, but the rest of the group always end up rejecting their ideas, saying it would never work or that it was a stupid idea. This segment quite often features quite controversial issues such as parodying the controversy of "Caged" Chickens with "Caged" Slaves.
- Ghost Roasters: A parody of various paranormal TV shows and movies; (most notably Ghostbusters, and Paranormal Activity). Amateurish Ghost Hunters Dylan and Moose, who dub themselves "psychic investigators extraordinaire", go about investigating occurrences of 'paranormal activity', which always occurs in their own homes. The so-called paranormal activity always turns out to be something completely normal (such as parents sleeping in next room). The title sequence is always typed up, but spelt wrong on the first try before being backspaced (typos include: "Ghost Rosters" and "Goat Roasters"). Similarly there is an end credit gag where there are various film roles listed; with almost every position taken up by Dylan. There are a few joke positions such as after listing Dylan as Best Boy followed by Moose listed as "Worst Boy", and "Assistant to Mr. Dylan" is listed as "Dylan's Sister" (who also takes up "Catering"), while "Assistant to Mr. Moose" is listed as "Nobody". The location is always said to be "Produced on location in Moose’s house" even when once it occurred in Dylan's house. And finally the segment ends with the words "The end … or is it?". Dylan also has a catchphrase which he states at the end: "Just because something can be explained by Science and common sense, doesn’t necessarily mean it’s not paranormal.", poking fun at the view held by many paranormalists.
- The Grammar Police: The strict law enforcement officers for linguistic law. The grammar police are always on the lookout for grammar errors that unwary students may let slip, and will eagerly apprehend violators or provoke them and make their lives miserable. Their presence is always signaled by intense music followed by them walking in slow-mo towards the 'scene of the crime'. This segment is possibly a parody of (or inspired by) a video of the same name made by YouTube Comedians Smosh.
- The Australian Stock Kids: In Australia 1829 two young convicts named Brian and Herman, who are kept in the stocks, meet each other for the first time. Brian however is an optimist and appears to enjoy being trapped in the stocks with his new friend, and loves the life in the "stinking penal colony", while sardonic Herman cannot understand how his comrade can be so happy.
- DJ Wicky: An eccentric DJ who loves "busting out" everyday situations he considers boring, and tries to make them more fun and appealing to the annoyance of whoever's there. His solutions include playing loud music with his boom-box to dancing on tables wreaking whatever was on the table.
- Trust me I've done First-Aid: Damian has done "first-aid" and prides in his medical abilities, eagerly stepping in whenever someone needs medical attention, but always ends up making it worse. Whenever he is questioned about his abilities, he will say: "Trust me, I've done First-Aid." The segment is a parody of Trust Me, I'm a Doctor, as well as the memes arising from the show.
- Andy the Gross Food Fact Cashier: Andy is a new employee at a fast food store, but he has an ignorant habit of telling his customers disgusting facts about the food they're about to buy, disgusting the customers away from the store, all the while he remains confused as to why they change their minds so quickly.
- Werewolf: Ryan is cursed with the wolf, every time he sees the full moon. He tries to warn off his friends about his imminent transformation and the potential threat to their lives, but his transformation is nothing more than him falling on all fours and acting like a wolf (though he actually behaves more like a dog).
- Photographing Foods with Phone: Pokes fun at the growing trend of Mobile Phone Food Photography. Three friends (played by Mia, Cosmo and Rowan) enjoy visiting a restaurant, and discussing the foods quality, but rather than eating and tasting the food, they're concerned with taking photos of the food with their phones.
- Literal condiments: Two girls (Mia and Molly) are in the kitchen making sandwiches, where the girl played by Molly will complain about the condiment she's using, the girl played by Mia will then suggest another brand of the condiment commenting on how its better (such as "crunchier" peanut butter or "fruitier" strawberry jam), but the descriptors always turn out to be literal, with the 'crunchier' peanut butter being a jar containing actual peanuts, and the jam jar pouring out strawberries.
- Mouse & Mouse: An animated segment which tells the story of a grey mouse (Hayden) who falls in love with a pretty white, smooth girl-mouse who makes a clicking sound, only problem is she's a (talking) computer mouse (Molly). Over the course of the series the grey mouse attempts to vainly woo over the love of his life.
- Tales from Story Book Land: An animated segment narrated by Jake which features 'fractured fairytales' where well known fairytales are given comical twists such as "Snow White and her Seven Bogan Cousins".
- Lost Property: An animated segment which features anthropomorphic lost objects converse and contemplate their fates, many of them being very paranoid. Due to the wide range of characters featured in this sketch, as a result it features various cast members.

The second series also features musical sketches such as: "The Internet Troll with No Internet", "We're Waiting for Our Teacher" (a parody Glee), "We Are the Nerds" (a parody of Queen's We Are the Champions) and many others.

== Notes ==
- In 2012, as part of his special interviewing with the cast during the making of You're Skitting Me, Studio 3 host Kayne Tremills guest stars in one episode, where he promotes the tin phone, a tin can phone on a string which parodies an iPhone having downloadable apps.
- Two You're Skitting Me cast members, Jake Fehily and Rowan Hills, appeared on the third season of Prank Patrol: Road Trip as pranksters, though in two different episodes.
