= ABC Kids =

ABC Kids may refer to:

- ABC Kids (Australia), a part-time digital TV channel for preschoolers from the Australian Broadcasting Corporation
- The brand name for the Australian Broadcasting Corporation's children's programming on ABC Television prior to 2009
- ABC Kids (TV programming block), a defunct youth's programming block on American Broadcasting Company in the US, 1997 to 2011

== See also ==
- ABC Kids World, a themed land at the Dreamworld amusement park on the Gold Coast, Queensland, Australia
