= The Loop (Australian TV series) =

- The Loop Logo
- Presented by: Olivia Phyland (2015–2020); Scott Tweedie (2012–2019); Ash London (2012–2015)
- Country of origin: Australia
- Original language: English
- No. of episodes: 421

Production
- Production locations: Sydney, New South Wales
- Running time: 150 minutes

Original release
- Network: 10 Peach
- Release: 28 January 2012 – 8 February 2020

Related
- Video Hits

The Loop was an Australian music video show that aired on digital channel 10 Peach each Saturday from 9am to 11.30am and was hosted by Scott Tweedie, Ash London and Olivia Phyland.

== History ==
The show premiered on 28 January 2012, featuring the top 20 songs from the iTunes chart alongside coverage of trends in music, video, and social media.

On 4 April 2015 Ash London resigned from the show to focus on her radio career. She was replaced by ABC3 presenter Olivia Phyland in July 2015.

Kent 'Smallzy' Small from Nova FM previously presented the music segment. Smallzy was then replaced by Angus O'Loughlin in 2014. In 2015, Scoopla's Entertainment reporter Justin Hill took over presenting the music segment.

The program reached a milestone of 250 episodes on 22 October 2016.

From 27 January to 10 March 2018, Dan Debuf filled as a presenter while Tweedie was away presenting the I'm a Celebrity...Get Me Out of Here! companion series, Edge of the Jungle. Debuf has since filled in on later occasions.

In November 2019, Scott Tweedie announced his resignation from Network 10 after years with the network, moving onto a new role overseas.

In February 2020, Network 10 announced that the show would be aired for the last time on Saturday 8 February 2020 after 8 years and over 400 episodes.

== Hosts ==
Original Final

Name	First Show	Last Show
Ash London	28 January 2012	4 April 2015
Scott Tweedie	28 January 2012	7 December 2019
Olivia Phyland	11 July 2015	8 February 2020

== Segments ==
=== Past segments ===
- ReLoop: An older song is played, sometimes with an introduction by the presenters.
- NuLoop: Refers to the debut playing of a new song or music video.
- LoopedIn: The latest music news is presented. This segment was originally presented by Tweedie and London, then from 13 July 2013, the segment was presented by Kent Small, and was later modified as an opinionated segment featuring countdowns of similar historic moments to the relevant news story, or tips for events. Small left the show after 5 July 2014, and was later replaced by Angus O'Loughlin, who left in 2015. The segment is currently hosted by entertainment reporter Justin Hill.
- LoopOff: First appeared on 24 November 2012 (episode 44) and a successor to LoopPlay. Viewers vote for one of two songs, which usually have a connection either through the artists or in the songs, to be played at the end of the show. The voting system was originally on Zeebox, which became known as Beamly from 2014. From 17 January 2015, the voting system changed to Twitter hashtags made for the week, and Facebook hashtags were included later.
- Loop Live: The presenters interview an artist and they play a song in the studio. This segment has become a regular occurrence since 2015.
- Is it a Banger?/Banger After 10: A song considered to be a "banger" is played, and viewers are to vote on social media with a bomb emoji if it is a banger, or a poo emoji if it is not a banger. The results are revealed in the following show. The origins of the segment occurred in 2016 when a "banger" was often the first song in the show. Later in 2016, the voting system was included, and the segment would often occur after 10am. The segment was moved later in the show to be in line with the 90s Power Hour. Since 2017, the songs are requested by viewers. Variations of the segment have also occurred, such as intentionally choosing a song not considered as a banger, and "Is it a BBQ Banger?" during the Summer Series where the bomb and poo emoji were replaced with a hot dog and salad emoji respectively.
- Loop News: The presenters highlight new songs and album releases. This segment has featured since 2015, although it began as a shorter segment often played between other shows and online. It became a part of the main show in 2018.
- Old School Hour: Since 2018, the first hour of the show features songs from a specific year. The hour features segments about the news, highlights, and trends from that year. Other segments such as "Is it a Banger?" and "LoopOff" also co-ordinate with the hour. The segment began starting with 1990 to 2007, then from 1983.
- What's Da Song?: Weekly online live segment presented by Tweedie. Up to three short snippets of three songs are played with viewers commenting to guess the name of the song. The first viewer to comment with the correct answer wins a prize from around the Network Ten offices.
- Top 20 countdown: The top 20 music downloads from the Australian iTunes chart were counted down throughout the show. The format ended on 20 October 2012 because newer songs would often have no accompanying music video, some songs would be performances from television shows on rival networks, and it prevented repetitiveness of songs weekly.
- Great Australian Loop: Three of the newest songs from Australian artists were played in a row. This short-lived segment was featured in the first few weeks of the show, although it did feature on Australia Day specials spread across the show.
- LoopTube: A selection of recent viral videos are previewed. This segment featured from 2012 to 2017.
- LoopReel: A new theatrical film is discussed by the presenters accompanied with a trailer. On occasions, interviews with actors or promotions related to the film are included. This segment featured from 2012 to 2017, while appearing less in later years.
- FanLoop: An older song which has been heavily requested by viewers gets played with an introduction by the presenters. This segment featured from 2012 to 2015.
- LoopPlay: Viewers vote for one out of the two new songs to be played the following week on Facebook. This segment was featured in three episodes in late 2012 before being replaced by LoopOff.
- UnLooped: A web exclusive segment where Tweedie and London discuss new songs they have discovered, news stories, play a game, and answer viewer questions. Seven of these were made in late 2012.
- ARIA Chart: The presenters highlight the songs and albums leading the weekly ARIA charts, go over new additions or notable changes, and predict what will be higher in the charts in following weeks. A competition would sometimes be announced during this segment. This segment featured from 2015 to 2017.
- Loop Charts: Similar to the ARIA Chart segment, but the presenters look at charts from around the world. This segment featured in 2017.
- 90s Power Hour: The last hour of the show contains songs from the 1990s. The segment began in 2017 following a 90s special, and continued for the rest of the year. Other segments such as "Is it a Banger?" and "LoopOff" also co-ordinate with the hour.
- Triple Play: Three songs requested by a viewer are played in a row without interruptions during the later part of the program. This segment featured in 2017, and would be played during the 90s Power Hour.

== Special shows ==
- Sat 28 Sep 2013 – Number 1 hits from 2013 so far
- Sat 21 Dec 2013 – 100th episode special celebration
- Sat 4 Jan 2014 – '90s special
- Sat 2 Aug 2014 – '90s special
- Sat 29 Nov 2014 – broadcast from 2014 ARIA Awards red carpet
- Sat 27 Dec 2014 – Number 1 hits from the past
- Sat 10 Oct 2015 – broadcast from 2015 ARIA Awards nominations
- Sat 28 Nov 2015 – broadcast from 2015 ARIA Awards red carpet, included "behind the scenes" segments
- An extra New Year's Eve show was broadcast at midnight on Thursday 31 December 2015.
- Sat 3 Sep 2016 – '90s special
- Sat 8 Oct 2016 – broadcast from 2016 30th ARIA Awards nominations
- Sat 22 Oct 2016 – 250th episode special celebration, Top 25 video hits
- On Saturday 31 December 2016, channel Eleven broadcast a special New Year's show with a countdown to midnight. The countdown, conducted by a group of supposed contest winners in a bored, deadpan style, became a viral video. It was later revealed by host Scott Tweedie on Studio 10 that the "contest winners" were really Network Ten staff who were jokingly trying to present the most "awkward" countdown ever. He added that they had not expect the clip to receive international attention.
- Sat 11 Mar 2017 – Rock Special
- Sat 21 Oct 2017 – 300th episode special celebration
- Sat 19 May 2018 – Royal Wedding special (Aired on Network Ten)
- Sat 7 Oct 2018 – 80s Movies Special
- Sat 19 Jan 2019 – Summer Songs Special
- Sat 9 Feb 2019 – 80s & 90s Special
- Sat 2 Mar 2019 – No.1s Special
- Sat 4 May 2019 – Aussie Classics Special
- Sat 18 May 2019 – 6:00pm–9:30pm – Alphabet Rock n' Roll Show
- Sat 20 Sep 2019 – 400th episode special celebration (Aired on Network Ten)
- Sat 19 Oct 2019 – Wacky Wardrobe
- Sat 26 Oct 2019 – Blondes Have More Fun
- Sat 14 Dec 2019 – Better than the OG (Cover Song Special)

== See also ==
- List of Australian music television shows
- List of Australian television series
