= ABC Me =

Australian television channel (2009–2024)

- Logo used from 2016 to 2024
- Country: Australia
- Broadcast area: Nationwide
- Network: ABC Television
- Headquarters: Sydney, New South Wales

Programming
- Language: English
- Picture format: 576i SDTV

Ownership
- Owner: Australian Broadcasting Corporation
- Sister channels: ABC Kids

History
- Launched: 4 December 2009 (as ABC3)
- Closed: 3 June 2024
- Replaced by: ABC Entertains
- Former names: ABC3 (2009–2016)

ABC Me was an Australian children's free-to-air television channel owned by the Australian Broadcasting Corporation. It was launched by Prime Minister Kevin Rudd on 4 December 2009 as ABC3, to become Australia's first dedicated children’s channel on free-to-air. It also aimed to broadcast 50% local programming. In ratings recorded in 2015, ABC3 held a high average audience of 562,000 among its target audience of 5–12-year-old children.

Budget cuts by the Abbott government led to a brand refresh on 19 September 2016 to ABC Me, with the network pushing online streaming. The channel also reduced its Australian content quota to 25%. On 3 June 2024, ABC Me was rebranded to ABC Entertains, which now features general entertainment programming. Children's programming mostly moved to ABC Family and ABC iview.

== History ==
=== 2007: Pre-launch ===
In September 2007, the Australian Government announced a proposal to launch a new digital-only children's channel, ABC3. It would be the first dedicated free-to-air children's channel in the country. A new ABC channel appeared on television receivers on 11 February 2008, as a placeholder for the future ABC3 channel. ABC3 was considered by the Australia 2020 Summit and given as one of the recommendations to the Government.

In April 2009, the Government's official response to the Summit approved the idea, and in the 2009–10 Commonwealth Budget $67 million was allocated towards ABC3 as part of the Government's $167 million funding increase to the ABC. The channel would aim to feature at least 50% Australian-produced content. It was not constrained by a local content quota.

On 18 June 2009, the corporation began its first public ABC3 campaign to scout for new hosting talent. On 22 October 2009, eight presenters were announced. Amberley Lobo and Kayne Tremills would host Studio 3, with Ben Crawley as a roving reporter, he later joined the show What Do You Know? alongside Dr Rhythm. Scott Tweedie would host Prank Patrol, while Hannah Wang and Mitchell Tomlinson were named as co-hosts of Rush TV and Stephanie Bendixsen and Steven O'Donnell were hosts of Good Game: Spawn Point, made for younger gamers, a spin-off of the ABC2 TV series Good Game.

=== 2009: Launch of ABC3 ===
Logo used from 2009 to 2016

On 4 December 2009 at 5pm, the hour-long Countdown to 3 special was broadcast on the channel and was simulcast on ABC TV. It featured special performances from Australian artists Cassie Davis and Short Stack, an introduction to various ABC3 presenters and shows and the station's launch around 6pm by then-Prime Minister Kevin Rudd.

In April 2011, James Elmer joined as co-host of Studio 3 along with Tremills and Lobo. On 4 December 2011, the winners from the MeOn3 contest were revealed as Alfie Gledhill and Olivia Phyland. On 14 September 2012, Alfie left Studio 3 to pursue acting dreams. In October 2012, Comedian Khaled Khalafala joined Studio 3, and stayed with the crew until early 2013 before leaving. Tim Matthews, Grace Koh and Ivy Latimer later joined Elmer and Phyland in July 2014 after winning the 3 Factor competition.

=== 2014: Budget cuts, ABC Me ===
In late 2014, the Abbott government announced an ABC funding cut of 4.6% over five years. To adapt, ABC3 quietly revised its Australian content quota from 50% to 25%, and slashed the amount of new episodes commissioned for original programs like Nowhere Boys and Ready For This.

In August 2016, it was announced that ABC3 would change its name to ABC Me on 19 September 2016, as more children watched television on a mobile device. The rebranded channel is reported to be "designed to reflect and celebrate the lives, interests and diversity of young Australians" and will increase its focus to primary school children. To mark the rebrand, ABC Me teamed up with 16-year-old singer Angel Tairua to record a new song "Unique (Me2U)", which became the channel's theme music.

In June 2020, many of the ABC Me staff in Melbourne lost their jobs after redundancies at the ABC were announced. The network was then broadcast without any presenters.

=== 2024: Rebranding ===
On 9 May 2024, it was announced that ABC Me would change its name to ABC Entertains on 3 June, shifting its format to general entertainment programming (with its launch anchored by premieres of new series of Interview with the Vampire and Wreck). Youth programming moved to ABC Family; although some programs still air in the morning (from 5–11am) and the ABC Education block (from 9–11am on weekdays) largely remains untouched. The ABC is also promoting ABC iview as the main home of its youth and children's output.

== Programming ==
- 100% Wolf: Legend of the Moonstone (2020)
- 6Teen
- The Adventures of Puss in Boots
- All Hail King Julien
- Almost Naked Animals
- Animalia
- Arthur
- Atomic Puppet
- Astro Boy
- The Bagel and Becky Show
- Barney's Barrier Reef
- Best Bugs Forever
- Best Ed
- Big Blue (2022)
- Bindi's Bootcamp
- Blue Water High
- Born to Spy (2021)
- Boruto: Naruto Next Generations
- Built to Survive (2022)
- Bushwhacked!
- Camp Lakebottom
- Canimals
- Cartoon It Up (2016)
- Charlie and Lola
- Chop Socky Chooks
- CJ The DJ
- Class Of The Titans
- Create (2017)
- Dance Academy
- Danger Mouse
- Dani's House
- The Day My Butt Went Psycho!
- Deadly 60
- Degrassi: The Next Generation
- Deltora Quest
- The Dengineers
- Dennis and Gnasher
- Dennis & Gnasher: Unleashed!
- Dex Hamilton: Alien Entomologist
- Dogstar
- Dorg Van Dango
- Dragon Booster
- DreamWorks Dragons
- Droners
- Dwight in Shining Armor
- Edgar & Ellen
- Escape from Scorpion Island
- Erky Perky
- The Fairly OddParents
- The Flamin' Thongs
- Find Me in Paris
- First Day (2020–2022)
- Flipper & Lopaka
- Fruits Basket (2001 series)
- Fruits Basket (2019 series, Season 1 only)
- Get Blake! (2015)
- Good Game: Spawn Point (2010–2023)
- GG: Spawn Squad (2023–2024)
- Grizzly Tales for Gruesome Kids
- Grojband
- Half Moon Investigations
- Horrible Histories (2015 series)
- I, Elvis Riboldi
- The InBESTigators (2019–2024)
- Iron Man: Armored Adventures
- Itch (2020)
- Jade Armor
- Jibber Jabber
- K-On!
- Kamisama Kiss
- Kid vs. Kat
- King Arthur's Disasters
- Kratt Bros: Be The Creature
- Kuu Kuu Harajuku
- Lab Rats Challenge
- Larry the Wonderpup
- The Legend of Korra
- Little Big Awesome
- Lizzie McGuire
- Log Horizon
- MaveriX (2022)
- M.I. High
- Mighty Mike
- Mikki vs. the World (2021)
- Miraculous: Tales of Ladybug & Cat Noir
- Mortified
- Mustangs FC (2017)
- My Goldfish Is Evil!
- The New Legends of Monkey (2018)
- News To Me (2016–2018)
- Oddbods
- Oggy and the Cockroaches (Seasons 1–3) (2010–2011)
- Old Tom
- Ouran High School Host Club
- Outback 8
- The Pinky & Perky Show
- The PM's Daughter (2022)
- Potatoes And Dragons
- Puella Magi Madoka Magica
- Radiant
- Richard Hammond's Blast Lab
- Rise of the Teenage Mutant Ninja Turtles
- Robot Wars
- RollerCoaster
- Ruby Gloom
- Rugrats
- Rush TV
- Sadie Sparks
- Sailor Moon Crystal
- School of Rock
- Scream Street
- Secret Life of Boys
- SheZow
- Sidekick
- The Slammer
- The Sleepover Club
- Slugterra
- So Awkward
- Space Nova (2021–2024)
- Spectacular Spider-Man
- Spellbinder
- Spirit Riding Free
- Spongo, Fuzz and Jalapeña (2019)
- Stoked
- Summer in Transylvania
- Summer Memories
- Sumo Mouse
- The Super Hero Squad Show
- Supernoobs
- Survive This
- Sword Art Online
- Teenage Mutant Ninja Turtles (2012 series)
- Thalu (2020)
- Thunderbirds Are Go
- Total Drama (seasons 1–5)
- Trapped!
- The Tribe
- The Twisted Whiskers Show
- The Unstoppable Yellow Yeti
- Vampire Knight
- The Wannabes
- Wishfart
- Wolfblood
- Wolverine And The X-Men
- Yakkity Yak
- Yoohoo and Friends
- You're Skitting Me
- Young Dracula
- The Zoo

== Presenters ==
- Kayne Tremills (2009–2015, 2019–2022)
- Amberley Lobo (2009–2015)
- Elliot Spencer (2009–2010)
- Scott Tweedie (2009–2013)
- Ben Crawley (2009–2011)
- Dave Cartel ("The Janitor") (2009–2013)
- Mitch Tomlinson (2009–2012)
- Hannah Wang (2009–2012)
- Stephanie "Hex" Bendixsen (2009–2016)
- Steven "Bajo" O'Donnell (2009–2017)
- Gus "Goose" Ronald (2011–2018)
- James Elmer (2011–2016)
- Alfie Gledhill (2011–2012)
- Olivia Phyland (2011–2015)
- Khaled Khalafalla (2012–2013)
- Grace Koh (2014–2018, 2020)
- Ivy Latimer (2014–2015)
- Tim Matthews (2014–2017)
- Pip Rasmussen (2016–2020)
- Angharad "Rad" Yeo (2017–2022)
- Lawrence Gunatilaka (2018–2019)
- Dallas Reedman (2018–2019)
- Ilai Swindells (2018)
- Gemma "Gem" Driscoll (2018–2024)
- Drew Parker (2019–2020)
- Jael Wena (2019)
- Ava Madon (2019–2020)
- William Yates (2019–2020)
