= Rollercoaster (TV series) =

Australian children's television show

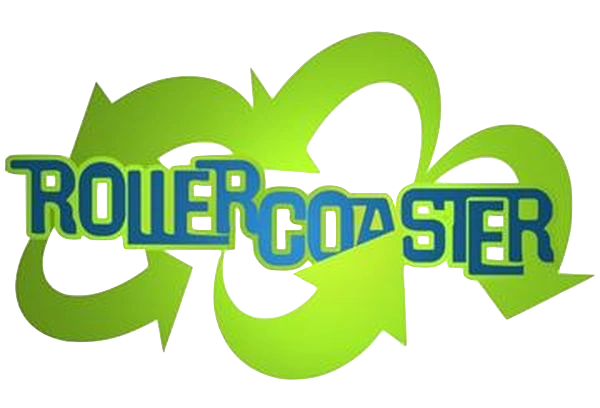
- Official title: RollerCoaster
- Genre: Children's hosted block
- Written by: Elliot Spencer
- Presented by: Elliot Spencer; Ruben Meerman
- Opening theme: "Great Adventure" by Nick Hardcastle
- Ending theme: "Great Adventure" by Nick Hardcastle
- Country of origin: Australia
- Original language: English
- No. of seasons: 5
- No. of episodes: 1,140

Production
- Production locations: ABC Perth, Western Australia
- Camera setup: Multi-camera
- Running time: 60 mins (2005–2009); 120 mins (late 2009–2010)
- Production company: Australian Broadcasting Corporation

Original release
- Network: ABC1; ABC3
- Release: 31 January 2005 – 29 January 2010

RollerCoaster is a children's television show which was broadcast by the Australian Broadcasting Corporation from between January 2005 and January 2010. Hosted by Elliot Spencer, it was aimed at an older audience than that for ABC Kids.

RollerCoaster was a "wrapper" show, usually incorporating three to five externally produced animated programs (formerly a mix of animated and live action shows) of varying lengths, which were interspersed with locally produced studio or location segments hosted by Spencer. It was aimed at older children and young teenaged audiences. The host, Elliot Spencer was usually the sole presenter, dressing up as characters for short sketches sometimes; on occasion members of RollerCoaster crew also appear in gags and sketches. The show also included regular features jointly presented by Spencer and Ruben Meerman, "The Surfing Scientist".

RollerCoaster followed a well-established format for Australian children's television. In order to comply with government-mandated Australian content regulations, local broadcasters have traditionally engaged a local presenter or team of presenters to "wrap" (or "top and tail") pre-produced segments such as cartoons. These shows offer a relatively inexpensive means of filling children's viewing times on Australian TV—the wrapper segments are generally made with a small crew and feature minimal production values; in the early days of Australian television the wrapper segments were performed live, although today they are now usually pre-recorded. The outsourced content is often purchased at relatively low cost, and for many decades Australian networks have been offered package-deal rates by American production houses and networks, as an incentive to purchase bundled content.

The 'outsourced' segments of the show were most commonly short animated series. Many of these programs are produced outside Australia with most sourced from other English-speaking countries, chiefly the United States, Britain, Canada and New Zealand. RollerCoaster alternates these short programs (e.g. Shaun the Sheep, The Mr. Men Show) with longer animated or live-action children's programs in a variety of genres, such as Roman Mysteries, Wolverine and the X-Men, Naturally, Sadie, 6Teen, Carl Squared, Atomic Betty, Girl Stuff, Boy Stuff, Young Dracula, Lizzie Mcguire, Even Stevens, Zoey 101, The Fairly OddParents, Best Ed, Silversun, Avatar: The Last Airbender, Round the Twist and more recently, the children's reality competition Escape from Scorpion Island. Such programs are usually produced for American or Canadian commercial or cable TV and are structured to allow the insertion of advertising breaks, so they have a slightly shorter running time on RollerCoaster, since the ABC carries no external advertising.

The locally produced portions of RollerCoaster featuring Spencer featured a number of recurring segments including: "Fetch", "Feed Me", "Now Poll", "MEE News", and "The Surfing Scientist" and "Professor Slo and Doctor Mo". Many of these segments included elements of audience participation or contributions via email or the RollerCoaster website's moderated chat rooms and message boards.

On 29 January 2010, Elliot Spencer announced he was leaving the show after five years of hosting, the ABC decided not to replace him and end the show completely. The show has been succeeded by Studio 3 Which was already running since 7 December 2009.

== History ==
=== Beginning ===
The series began in January 2005, filling a slot once occupied by The Afternoon Show. It broke over the Australian summer school holidays and was replaced by a special Christmas line-up. During the holidays there were generally three or four popular shows repeated every day, rather than interchanging every day.

Sometimes instead of the usual three or four shows a 'special' would be shown. These included 'double episodes' of Degrassi: The Next Generation and the Edgar and Ellen specials. Wallace and Gromit stop motion animation movies were shown as well. Each year, the last week of RollerCoaster would air Christmas related programmes or holiday themed episodes of series which have aired on the show previously.

=== Broadcast ===
Graphics for the studio segments are produced using Chroma key or green screen technology. This means many gags, information segments, and backgrounds, can be used and changed quickly. Props are kept to a minimum, like in the Feed Me segment where a preparation table and mixing bowl are used, or in Chatter and other segments where a retro style yellow table appears, now a RollerCoaster signed table with green and black stripes on the front and a storage on the back.

=== Rewind ===
From Monday 19 June 2006, RollerCoaster Rewind began on ABC1 in early weekday mornings, the show repeated the programming from four months earlier in reverse order originally until from 9 July 2007, where this was changed so that the programmes were aired in the correct order, though later again reverted to reverse order. Because RollerCoaster Rewind runs in the non-ratings season and the regular show does not, in early 2008 RollerCoaster Rewind caught up to the current broadcast of RollerCoaster, resulting in the ABC replacing their early morning programming by other series until 'Rewind' resumed from where it left off.

On Friday 21 December 2007, the last show of RollerCoaster aired for that year, returning on Monday 25 February 2008 for its first show of the new year.

=== Revamp ===
From 2 March 2009, the show moved from its previous time slot of 5:00–6:00pm AEST, and moved down an hour earlier, from 4:00–5:00pm. The presentation also changed to filming in a real set in contrast to previously, where they would film in front of a green screen with closed captions. It remained a wrapper program, and the segments remained the same, however the programs were no longer interchanged, and each day featured the same line-up of shows. Another change was that it only included animation now, with live action shows not "boxed" by the RollerCoaster format and were seen following in the 5pm-6pm slot.

=== ABC3 ===
From 7 December 2009, RollerCoaster began airing on the then recently launched children-orientated multi-channel ABC3 following the original screening on its sister channel ABC1 from 4-5pm. A RollerCoaster Rewind carbon copy version of the show entitled RollerCoaster on Vacation aired on ABC3 during the 09–10 Australian school holidays.

=== Best Of RollerCoaster ===
Weekends on ABC3 from 5 December 2009 includes "Best Of" Hosted segments with Elliot on the show over the year. Also including 2 episodes of Best Ed, then 1 episode of Carl Squared

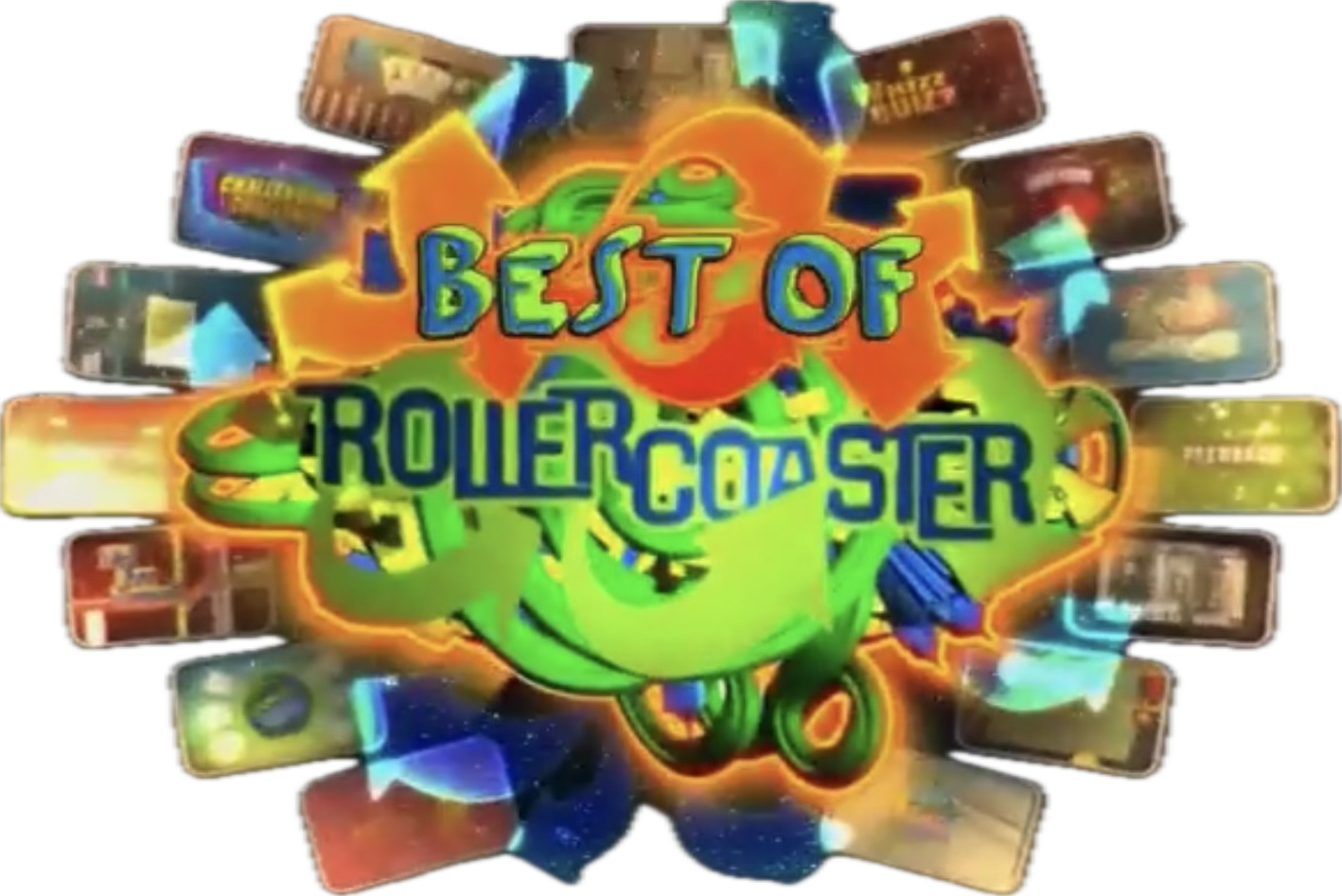

=== Ending ===
At the end of the Friday 29 January 2010 edition, Spencer announced that he was leaving the show and thanked viewers for his five years as presenter and writer of the series. By the same date, the main RollerCoaster URL was redirecting visitors to the new ABC3 website; some pages including "Elliot's Blah" still function, though now carry the disclaimer that they are no long being updated as well as a link redirecting visitors to a new RollerCoaster section in the ABC3 site. Elliot sang a song entitled "Bye for now, not forever!" and explained "it was a good five years".

== Segments and features ==
RollerCoaster sometimes show special weeks either to celebrate an event or an incoming show, like Roma Week, which centres on the incoming show of Roman Mysteries in 2007; Christmas week, celebrating Christmas by showing programs relating to Christmas; magic week, celebrating magic by showing a magic trick done by a professional every episode. Theme weeks have also included Feed Me Week with Feed me being presented every day, also done in a similar way with Elliot and the Surfing Scientist on National Science Week. There have also been Sports Week, with Elliot finding out about different sports; and a character week when Elliot dressed up as characters that he has dressed up as before. In 2009 there are themed days as well as weeks.

As well as special segments, special weeks and days are sometimes scheduled according to a general theme. In 2007 'All New Tuesday' (ANT) made all shows shown on Tuesdays new, and on Thursday the theme was 'Rollertoons Day'. In 2008 'All New Tuesday' has been replaced by a new 'Rollertoons Day', Thursday shows are all Australian-made, Friday shows all have a "creepy" theme, and Mondays have been set aside purely for comedy shows as 'LOL Day'. This is no longer used in 2009 since the same shows are on each day of the week. One time, Elvis Presley (acted out by Elliot Spencer) was on RollerCoaster on Wednesday of June in 2009 and included a Whizz Quiz about Elvis and a NOW Excuses about Elvis' CD.

Regular segments include:

- 'Feed Me', a cooking segment where Elliot attempts to cook and then tries a recipe sent in by an audience member (on Wednesday)
- 'Feedback', when viewers send in letters to Elliot (on Tuesday and Thursday)
- 'Chatter', Elliot reads chats that had been sent on the website on a particular topic. He also reads jokes and acronyms (on Tuesday, sometimes)
- 'LOCIW' Elliot reads acronyms sent in by viewers (on Monday)
- 'Fetch', a segment where people send in their made-up words with their definitions. Elliot tries to put all these words into a weird anecdote (on Friday).
- 'What Career am I?', where Elliot gives clues and then reveals a career. He introduces someone that has that career and gives them a challenge. Similar segments called "Where in the world am I?" and "Which Olympian am I? Past or present" have also featured in the past.
- 'Elliot and The Surfing Scientist', where Elliot and Ruben Meerman do simple experiments (on Tuesday).
- 'El Lamo World Records', where viewers send in record attempts for Elliot to 'attempt but not necessarily complete' one or even two at once of these on air (on Tuesday, sometimes).
- 'Roller Tale', where viewers send in stories which must be about Elliot's fictional alter egos Tapioca Toe Maker and Pocket Waffle. These are acted out by Elliot (on Friday, now the story finished).
- 'Sponge Brain Quiz', a true or false quiz, shown before Naturally Sadie with nature-themed questions. In the past it has been about Roman Mysteries and Dinosapien and themed to these shows. Since Naturally Sadie ended, the Quiz is still present in the same time slot. In 2009 it was renamed Whizz Quiz and was not nature-based. (on Wednesday).
- 'MEE News', Elliot dresses up as Michael Eion Everyringtone and presents a news bulletin. (on Friday)
- 'NOW', Elliot presents the audience a poll, hypothetical situation or question on one day. Viewers vote on the show's website and the results are featured on the next day's episode. (Monday/Tuesday for polls, Tuesday/Wednesday for HPS, Wednesday/Thursday for questions)
- 'Replay Bits That We've Played Already', where viewers request segments previously aired to be replayed (on Thursday).
- 'Professor Slo and Doctor Mo', where Elliot and Ruben Meerman dress up as the segment's namesakes and show a science experiment in slo mo (on Thursday).
- 'Triple Triple Triplets', 'The Kransky Sisters', where music critics review an album or explain it (on Monday, sometimes)
- 'Jaxon's 5', a play on the Jackson 5, this features a food correspondent explain a meal's top five highlights (on Wednesday, sometimes).
- Booked out, a book review performed by Geoff Hutchison's son Hugh (unknown day).
- 'Jade's Movies', a play when a movie correspondent explain a movie, past or present, and gives how many reviews out of 5 is the movie (on Monday, sometimes).
- 'T5', Elliot reads tongue-twisters (On Friday, sometimes).
- 'Talk to Me', Elliot tells a question from the viewers and answer it.
- 'Best of ABC3', Elliot to be RollerCoaster from the viewers and answer it from RollerCoaster in ABC3. See ABC3.
- 'Zimmer Twins', A series of mini-movies made by kids around the country on the RollerCoaster website. The series also aired on Teletoon for Canadian viewers.

Other segments are used only once or rarely, as in Your Jokes, a division of Chatter, where viewers send in jokes. It is sometimes used as fill-ins for updated segments, such as when the Now technology was being "re-now-ified".

The theme tune "(RollerCoaster)" was performed and co-written by former ABC-TV Creature Features presenter Nick Hardcastle. It was fully played in 2005 along with a video clip featuring Hardcastle and a man dressed as a rabbit. The opening graphics are computer generated and feature an interdimensional trip through a fantastic world of images and 3D graphics, culminating by racing through a portal into a white universe with a complex 3D image of a space station style city with roads, skyscrapers, cars, butterflies and robots before the RollerCoaster logo appears from outside the screen to form itself in front of the base of the floating city. This theme has remained unchanged since 2005 (except in 2009, the RollerCoaster is longer, in 2005 to 2008 and Thursday to Friday in 2009, the theme song was 23 seconds, and in Monday to Wednesday in 2009 it was 28 seconds).

== Website ==
"RollerCoaster" is also the name of the show's website, which was created a few years previous to the show itself and features the phrase 'Rhymes with toaster'. The website itself was advertised as 'RollerCoaster' on the current timeslot taken by the show for a couple of years before the show began. The website features articles on shows and games and other entertainment related to shows or the general youth genre. This site is also where polls, voting, feedback and other interactive content could be submitted.

== See also ==
- Children's programming on ABC Television
