= Yellow Jacket: The Beach Crazy Cyclist =

Short stop motion animated show for children

Yellow Jacket: The Beach Crazy Cyclist, also referred to as Head In The Handlebars (French: La tete dans le guidon), is a short stop motion animated show for children made in France and originally aired in 2005. It features the quick and whimsical adventures of a bicycle racer wearing a yellow jacket and his nemesis, a black jacket-wearing cyclist, amongst other toy characters. The cyclists are always model people but the spectators are toys and models like dolls and crabs. Black Jacket and Yellow Jacket are always at the centre of the plot, with Black Jacket using some devious trick to try to win and Yellow Jacket generally not trying to stop him, letting fate or karma prevent Black Jacket from winning. The show is always set at a beach and at a minuscule level. Sometimes a human will, in stop motion form, enter the show. After Yellow Jacket wins the first half of the closing credits plays then a small continuation gag plays and the rest of the credits roll. The sand is real and the bikes leave trails though much of it is not filmed at an actual beach but in a studio.

A sequel titled Head In The Snowflakes was produced and distributed in 2007. It received an animation award at the Livigno Snowboard Film Festival in 2009.

== Distribution ==
It is currently being shown on ABC Rollercoaster on ABC television in Australia.
