= Brandon Walters =

Australian actor (born 1996)

- Born: 16 January 1996 (age 30); Broome, Western Australia, Australia
- Occupation: Actor
- Years active: 2007–present

Brandon Walters (born 16 January 1996) is an Indigenous Australian actor known for his performance as Nullah in the 2008 film Australia.

== Early life ==
Born in Broome, Western Australia, Walters was diagnosed with leukaemia at the age of 6, but overcame the cancer after spending a year in a Perth hospital in 2003.

== Career ==
Australia director Baz Luhrmann had been searching for a young aboriginal boy to fill the role of "Nullah" for over 12 months when one of the film's casting directors saw Walters with his father at a Broome swimming pool in 2007; he also responded to an Australia-wide radio callout for auditions. He later received a letter from Luhrmann saying that he was "very, very interested" in him.

Walters, who had never before left Western Australia, and a group of other boys who had auditioned for the role were flown to Sydney to attend acting workshops at Fox Studios Australia. He and his family went camping with Luhrmann at Broome's Eighty Mile Beach, which was when Walters decided to take the role and become involved in the film.

When Walters joined the cast, he had never heard of the film's stars Nicole Kidman or Hugh Jackman. Walters had only ever seen a few films, but was nevertheless quoted by Luhrmann as having "natural cinematic chemistry". Though Kidman and Walters were shy upon their first meeting with each other, she said that they bonded on the set of the film and "I feel very protective of him... [and] if the film does really well he's going to need a lot of protection"; reportedly, Kidman and Luhrmann set up a trust fund for Walters to secure his future.

Luhrmann, who also cast Walters in a Tourism Australia advertising campaign, claimed, "Our next leading man is about four-foot high, [with] long, sort of gold hair, and is an Aboriginal boy." For his performance as Nullah, Walters won a Satellite Award for New Talent and received nominations for Best Young Actor at the Broadcast Film Critics Association Awards and Most Promising Performer at the Chicago Film Critics Association Awards.

He also starred in the first (2012) season of the ABC3 series Bushwhacked!, but was replaced in the second (2014) season by Kamil Ellis.

In 2020, Walters appeared in two television series: the comedy-drama Operation Buffalo and the murder mystery series Mystery Road.

== Personal life ==
Walters has two children with his former partner. In 2020, he was convicted of several offences in the Magistrates Court of Western Australia, including drink driving, driving on a suspended licence, and smashing his former partner's car window.
