= Game of Games =

- Genre: Game show; Comedy; Family; Reality
- Created by: Ellen DeGeneres
- Based on: Ellen's Game of Games
- Presented by: Grant Denyer
- Narrated by: Ash London
- Country of origin: Australia
- Original language: English
- No. of seasons: 1
- No. of episodes: 11

Production
- Production location: Fox Studios Australia
- Camera setup: Multiple-camera setup
- Running time: 90 minutes (including adverts)
- Production company: Warner Bros. International Television Production

Original release
- Network: Network Ten
- Release: 7 October – 15 December 2018

Game of Games is an Australian TV game show hosted by Grant Denyer based on the American game show Ellen's Game of Games. It premiered on Network Ten on Sunday, 7 October 2018 at 7:30pm and on 24 November 2018 Channel Ten changed its timeslot to 7:00pm every Saturday. The first season concluded on 15 December 2018.

== Series overview ==
Series	Episodes	Originally released	
Series	Episodes	First released	Last released
1	11	7 October 2018	15 December 2018

== Format ==
Game of Games has a similar format to its US counterpart, Ellen's Game of Games. The show consists of a number of preliminary games, a game of 'Know or Go' (with the four preliminary game winners competing in it) and then 'Hot Hands' (with the winner of 'Know or Go' competing for $50,000). In some episodes, 'Blindfolded Musical Chairs' acts as an extra semifinal round before 'Know or Go'. If 'Blindfolded Musical Chairs' is played, there are 5 preliminary rounds so that there are 5 players, so that the last player, who doesn't get a seat, is eliminated from playing in 'Know or Go'.

Every show begins with a short intro showing the games that would be played in the episode and the $50,000 prize available. It then introduces Grant Denyer by saying "It's game time!".

=== Preliminary games ===
- Aw Snap!: Contestants are joined by a bungee cord. The first contestant to move five apples into a basket using only their teeth advances.
- Danger Word: Two teams of two members each play this game. Similar to the game show Password, one person on each team is shown a "winning word" and must give clues to help their partner guess it. The two teams alternate giving clues; a correct guess earns a strike for the opposing team, whose guesser is then sprayed in the face with the contents of one of three cannons. Each round also features a secret "danger word" that is related to the winning word; if a guesser says the danger word, he/she is sprayed and his/her team earns a strike. The first team to earn three strikes is eliminated, and one member of the winning team advances to "Blindfolded Musical Chairs."
- Dizzy Dash: The game starts with Grant reading aloud a trivia question to the contestants. Before contestants can answer, they are spun around in order to disorient them. To answer the question, the contestants must run to a nearby podium and grab the ball on top of it. The first contestant to answer three questions correctly advances to the next round.
- Don't Leave Me Hanging: In this game, three contestants are suspended in the air from harnesses. The contestants take turns to guess answers that fit a given category, such as "How Many Island Countries Can You Name?". A category ends when one contestant gives an incorrect answer, repeats a previous answer, or takes too long to respond; when that happens, the contestant gets a strike. A contestant who gets three strikes is eliminated and launched to the top of the studio. The winner would then advance to "Blindfolded Musical Chairs" or the next round.
- Make It Rain: For this game, two contestants answer trivia questions asked by Grant for turns at pulling down one of several umbrellas. One of the umbrellas contains a cash prize of $10,000, in addition to a chance at playing "Blindfolded Musical Chairs." The rest of the umbrellas are filled with water.
- Master Blaster: This game involves three contestants attached to bungee cords. The contestants then compete to solve a jigsaw-style puzzle. The losing contestants are "blasted" into the air and do not proceed to the next round.
- Mr. Big Stuff: Two contestants are strapped in big outfits. Everytime a dance appears on the screen, the big man must impersonate it while the other is guessing. After the original round, the other round gives the teams double points. The winning team chooses a person to move onto the next round.
- One-Eyed Monster: This game uses a set of giant prop monster jaws with removable teeth, one of which will cause the jaws to close and eliminate the contestant who pulls it. The contestants took turns answering questions from Grant which have an answer that's between 0 and 5. Depending on how far away they were from the answer, they would have to pull out that amount teeth (i.e., the distance between their incorrect answer and the correct answer). If they got it right, they didn't have to pull any teeth.
- The Laundry Game: The game involves two teams of two joined together in a giant, coloured 'jumper' and must work together to get five gigantic balls into a 'washing machine'. The teams must watch out for the soap, bubbles and giant, hanging t-shirts. The winning team, who gets all of their balls through the hole in the washing machine, get to choose one contestant to play in the next round, "Blindfolded Musical Chairs" or "Know or Go".
- Tomb of Doom: Two teams of two must race to the top of a giant pyramid to answer a question from Grant, although the steps are slippery & covered in soap and massive boulders are pushed down to stop contestants. The team who reaches the top of the 'pyramid' and pushes the buzzer gets to answer Grant's question. If they answer incorrectly, the turn goes to the other team. At the end of the game, the team with 3 correct answers or the most points moves on to the next round.
- Tuba Toothpaste: Contestants sit at separate banks of 10 buttons that resemble the valves on a tuba. Grant asks a series of trivia questions, one to each contestant in turn. If a contestant answers incorrectly, Grant spins a wheel to determine how many buttons (one, two, or three) they must press. One button triggers a blast of toothpaste into the contestant's face and eliminates them from the game.
- You Bet Your Wife: In this game, two teams of spouses or fiancés compete against each other. One partner from each couple is suspended from the ceiling in a harness. The other two partners do an auction-style bid on how many answers their partners can give in a given category (e.g., "national brands of toothpaste") within the 30-second time frame. When one of the partners on the ground issues a challenge, the other team's suspended partner must give the required number of responses. There is no penalty for incorrect answers. Giving the required number of responses earns that team one point, while the opposing team's suspended partner gets dropped. If the challenged team fails, the corresponding spouse is dropped. The first team to earn three points wins and chooses one member of the pair to advance to the next round.

=== Semifinal games ===
Blindfolded Musical Chairs: Five contestants, who won the preliminary games, play this game and are blindfolded. The contestants dance around until the music stops and must find a randomly placed stool to sit on to stay in the game. Grant will press a button to determine where the chairs will appear on the dancefloor. The last contestant to not find a seat is eliminated, and others move on to Know or Go.

Know or Go: The winners of the four preliminary games stand on a row of trap doors, and take turns answering questions. An incorrect answer results in the contestant being eliminated from the game and dropped through the trap door, sliding down a chute that empties below the stage. The last contestant standing advances to the Hot Hands game.

=== Final games ===
Hot Hands: The contestant has 30 seconds to identify the faces of ten celebrities that fit a certain category. After identifying a celebrity, the contestant must press a button to move on to the next face. Contestants may pass if they are unsure but will need to wait three seconds until the next face appears. Contestants earn an escalating amount of money based on the number of faces they correctly identify, as shown in the table below. Correctly identifying ten celebrities earns the grand prize of $50,000.

Correct answers	Money won
1	$50
2	$500
3	$1,000
4	$5,000
5	$10,000
6	$15,000
7	$20,000
8	$25,000
9	$35,000
10	$50,000

== Episodes ==
=== Season 1 (2018) ===
No. overall	No. in season	Title	Original release date	Australian viewers (millions)
1	1	"Don't Leave Me Hanging Kaith"	7 October 2018	536,000
Preliminary Games: Dizzy Dash / Don't Leave Me Hanging / Tomb of Doom / Tuba Toothpaste / Aw Snap!; Preliminary Game Winners: Corey / Kaith / Lauren / Andrew / Hazel; Preliminary Game 2 Winners: Corey / Lauren / Andrew / Hazel; Hot Hands: $50,000; Winner: Andrew; Game Winner Won: Tuba Toothpaste
2	2	"You Bet Your Wife is Pie"	14 October 2018	416,000
Preliminary Games: Make it Rain / Danger Word / The Laundry Game / You Bet Your Wife / One-Eyed Monster; Preliminary Game Winners: Lisa / Paul / Alex / Amanda / Esther; Preliminary Game 2 Winners: Lisa / Alex / Amanda / Esther; Hot Hands: $5,000; Winner: Amanda; Game Winner Won: You Bet Your Wife
3	3	"Amy Needs Danger Word"	21 October 2018	325,000
Preliminary Games: Don't Leave Me Hanging / Danger Word / Dizzy Dash / Tomb of Doom / One-Eyed Monster; Preliminary Game Winners: Warwick / Amy / Calvin / Angela / Oliver; Preliminary Game 2 Winners: Warwick / Amy / Angela / Oliver; Hot Hands: $50,000; Winner: Warwick; Game Winner Won: Don't Leave Me Hanging
4	4	"Don't Leave Me Hang, Name!"	28 October 2018	256,000
Preliminary Games: Tuba Toothpaste / Don't Leave Me Hanging / Tomb of Doom / Dizzy Dash / Danger Word; Preliminary Game Winners: Julie / Mayukh / Justin and James / Neil / Jack Sr. and Jack Jr.; Preliminary Game 2 Winners: Julie / Mayukh / Justin / Neil; Hot Hands: $5,000; Winner: Neil; Game Winner Won: Dizzy Dash
5	5	"Met Your Begin Don't Leave Me Hanging Stories"	4 November 2018	297,000
Preliminary Games: Master Blaster / Tuba Toothpaste / Mr. Big Stuff / Aw Snap! / Don't Leave Me Hanging; Preliminary Game Winners: Brandon / Arjuna / Paul / Julia / Jackson; Preliminary Game 2 Winners: Brandon / Arjuna / Paul / Julia; Hot Hands: $20,000; Winner: Arjuna; Game Winner Won: Tuba Toothpaste
6	6	TBA	11 November 2018	229,000
