= Movie Juice =

- Genre: Film review
- Starring: Jessica Tovey; Scott Tweedie; Alicia Marone; Carissa Walford
- Country of origin: Australia
- Original language: English
- No. of seasons: 3

Production
- Running time: 22 minutes per episode

Original release
- Network: Network Ten (2014–2015); Nine Network (2017–present)
- Release: 2014–2015; 25 October 2017–2018

Movie Juice is an Australian film review television series which screened between 2014 and 2018. The first two seasons screened on Network Ten at 2.30pm on Saturdays with repeats on its digital channels Eleven and One. It was revived by the Nine Network for a third season on 25 October 2017 at 11.30pm on Wednesdays with repeats on 9Go!.

== Presenters ==
- Jessica Tovey
- Scott Tweedie
- Alicia Marone
- Carissa Walford
