= Tractor Monkeys =

Television series

- Genre: Game show
- Directed by: Mark Fitzgerald
- Presented by: Merrick Watts
- Starring: Katie "Monty" Dimond; Dave O'Neil
- Country of origin: Australia
- Original language: English
- No. of seasons: 1

Production
- Production locations: Melbourne, Victoria
- Running time: 36 minutes

Original release
- Network: ABC1
- Release: 20 March – 25 December 2013

locations MelbourneTractor Monkeys is an Australian comedic television quiz show hosted by Merrick Watts. Seventeen episodes screened on ABC1 in 2013.

== Format ==
The show features two teams of guest panellists, one led by comedian Dave O'Neil and the other by radio presenter Katie "Monty" Dimond. They compete in rounds of questions and games about trends, fads and social phenomena. The show also included a second screen experience via an ABC Companion Pad app for iPad.

== Episodes ==
Series	Episodes	Originally released	
Series	Episodes	First released	Last released
1	8	20 March 2013	8 May 2013
2	8	25 September 2013	13 November 2013
Special		25 December 2013	

=== Series 1 ===
No. overall	No. in season	Kate's team	Dave's team	Original release date
1	1	Tom Gleeson & Frank Woodley	Ella Hooper & Adam Richard	20 March 2013
2	2	Sam Simmons & Rebecca De Unamuno	Aamer Rahman & Genevieve Morris	27 March 2013
3	3	Kate Langbroek & Dave Thornton	Toby Truslove & Denise Scott	3 April 2013
4	4	HG Nelson & Josh Thomas	Tommy Little & Jeff Green	10 April 2013
5	5	Fiona O'Loughlin & Joel Creasey	Ronny Chieng & Rob Carlton	17 April 2013
6	6	Lawrence Mooney & Kayne Tremills	Celia Pacquola & Ed Kavalee	24 April 2013
7	7	Anthony Morgan & Tommy Little	Noeline Brown & Akmal Saleh	1 May 2013
8	8	Denise Scott & Mel Buttle	Matt Okine & Denise Drysdale	8 May 2013

=== Series 2 ===
No. overall	No. in season	Title	Kate's team	Dave's team	Original release date
9	1	"Fashion"	Mark Trevorrow & Hannah Gadsby	Kerri-Anne Kennerley & James Kerley	25 September 2013
10	2	"Love"	Shane Jacobson & Adam Richard	Noeline Brown & Mel Buttle	2 October 2013
11	3	"Family"	Denise Scott & Sammy J	Rob Carlton & Rosie Beaton	9 October 2013
12	4	"TV"	Adam Richard & Frank Woodley	Graeme Blundell & Sarah Kendall	16 October 2013
13	5	"Technology"	Max Walker & Tom Ballard	Ed Kavalee & Claire Hooper	23 October 2013
14	6	"Sport And Leisure"	Peter Helliar & Sarah Kendall	Adam Zwar & Jean Kittson	30 October 2013
15	7	"School"	Daryl Braithwaite & Celia Pacquola	Cal Wilson & Mikey Robins	6 November 2013
16	8	"Summer"	Matt Okine & Kate Langbroek	Glenn Robbins & Ella Hooper	13 November 2013

=== Special ===
No.	Title	Kate's team	Dave's team	Original release date
1	"Christmas Special"	Denise Scott & Ryan Fitzgerald	Lawrence Mooney & Marcia Hines	25 December 2013

== Ratings ==
=== Series 1 ===
No.	Title	Air date	Timeslot	Overnight ratings	Ref(s)
No.	Title	Air date	Timeslot	Viewers	Ref(s)
1	Episode 1	20 March 2013	8:30pm	467,000	
2	Episode 2	27 March 2013	8:30pm	—N/a	
3	Episode 3	3 April 2013	8:30pm	—N/a	
4	Episode 4	10 April 2013	8:30pm	371,000	
5	Episode 5	17 April 2013	9:00pm	428,000	
6	Episode 6	24 April 2013	9:00pm	—N/a	
7	Episode 7	1 May 2013	9:00pm	419,000	
8	Episode 8	8 May 2013	9:00pm	405,000	

=== Series 2 ===
All episodes aired at 8:00pm.

No.	Title	Air date	Overnight ratings	Ref(s)
No.	Title	Air date	Viewers	Ref(s)
1	"Fashion"	25 September 2013	574,000	
2	"Love"	2 October 2013	476,000	
3	"Family"	9 October 2013	552,000	
4	"TV"	16 October 2013	580,000	
5	"Technology"	23 October 2013	—N/a	
6	"Sport And Leisure"	30 October 2013	769,000	
7	"School"	6 November 2013	508,000	
8	"Summer"	13 November 2013	—N/a	
9	"Christmas Special"	25 December 2013	—N/a	
