= Claire Edwardes =

Australian percussion musician

Claire Edwardes OAM
- Born: Claire Olivia Edwardes; 9 September 1975 (age 51)
- Instrument: Percussion
- Member of: Ensemble Offspring
- Website: http://www.claireedwardes.com

Claire Olivia Edwardes OAM (born 9 September 1975) is an Australian classical percussionist, artistic director, composer and advocate for change in the classical music sector. Edwardes is the co-founder and artistic director of Ensemble Offspring, roles she shared with composer Damien Ricketson until his retirement from the group in 2015. In 2016, she won two APRA Art Music Awards, with one going to Ensemble Offspring for "sustained services to Australian music for 20 years", and Edwardes receiving an individual award "for performance, advocacy and artistic leadership”. She is the only Australian to have won the Luminary Art Music Award for an Individual 3 times. In 2019, Edwardes created and performed the music and dance theatre work RECITAL with dancer Richard Cilli and director Gideon Obarzanek for Dance Massive 2019. Edwardes composed the music and sound design for RECITAL in collaboration with Paul Mac. In 2011 and 2017, Edwardes was a member of the Australian World Orchestra. In 2015-2016, Edwardes was the Vice President of the New Music Network. Edwardes has appeared on television as an occasional host of Play School, and as a panelist on Spicks and Specks. In 2021, Edwardes created The Australian Marimba Composition Kit and a comprehensive list of percussion works by female composers. Additionally, Edwardes has composed numerous works for solo waterphone. She is currently on staff as a percussion teacher at the Sydney Conservatorium of Music.

== Early life, education and career ==
Edwardes was born in Sydney's Inner West, where she now lives. She began learning piano at age 5 while living in country Victoria for several years and on returning to Sydney studied with Faye Lake throughout her life into her early 20's. Edwardes was educated at Fort Street High School and graduated as Student of the Year with a Bachelor of Music from Sydney Conservatorium of Music in 1997 where she studied with Daryl Pratt and Richard Miller. In 1999, Edwardes won the Symphony Australia Young Performers Award before relocating to the Netherlands to complete a master's degree at Codarts (with teachers Richard Janssen and Hans Leenders) and the Conservatorium van Amsterdam (with teachers Peter Prommel, Jan Pustjens and Nick Woud) on a Dutch Government Nuffic Huygens Scholarship. She was resident in the Netherlands for seven years during which time she won numerous instrumental competitions, toured extensively, performed with numerous ensembles including Ictus Ensemble and Slagwerk Den Haag. Edwardes also founded her percussion groups Duo Vertigo with Niels Meliefste. During this time she also worked closely with composers including Louis Andriessen, Unsuk Chin, Harrison Birtwistle and Steve Reich.

Returning to Sydney in 2006, Claire became co-artistic director of Ensemble Offspring the group she had been part of the inaugural concert year of as part of the Sydney Spring Festival in 1995. Claire has performed at international festivals from MONA FOMA Festival (Tasmania) and Gaudeamus International Music Week (Utrecht) to Queensland Music Festival (Cooktown), Music on Main (Vancouver) and Shanghai New Music Week (China). Claire is endorsed by Adams Percussion and Vic Firth.

As a soloist and artistic director of Ensemble Offspring, Claire has extensively commissioned, programmed, curated, documented and performed music by living, Australian composers - in particular female identifying and First Nations composers.

Edwardes is the Australian Keychange Ambassador as well as the Donne Women in Music Ambassador.

== Discography ==
=== Albums ===
Title	Details
Till Time Brings Change	Released: 2001; Label: ABC Classics; Format: CD
Coil	Released: 2007; Label: Tall Poppies (TP193); Format: CD
Flash: Marimba Miniatures	Released: 2011; Label: Tall Poppies (TP215); Format: CD
One	Released: 2013; Label: Tall Poppies (TP223); Format: CD
Kammerbox	Released: 2016; Label: ABC Classics; Format: CD
Claireaudient	Released: 2017; Label: ABC Classics; Format: CD
Rhythms of Change	Released: 2021; Label: Move; Format: CD

=== Compilations and recordings with ensembles ===
- 2005 The Axe Manual (Nicolas Hodges) Metronome Label
- 2007 Vertigo One (Duo Vertigo) Karnatic Lab Records
- 2014 The Secret Noise (Ensemble Offspring) Curious Noise
- 2015 Cycles & Circles (Ensemble Offspring)
- 2018 Music for the Dreaming (Ensemble Offspring) ABC Classic
- 2019 & 2020 Women of Note ABC Classics ABC Classic
- 2017 - 2021Offspring Bites 1, 2 & 3 (Ensemble Offspring)

== Awards, nominations and fellowships ==
=== Awards and nominations ===
- 1999 Winner - ABC Young Performers Award
- 2000 Winner - Tromp Percussion Competition (Utrecht)
- 2001 Winner - Concertgebouw Vriendenkrans Prize (Amsterdam)
- 2001 Winner - Llangollen International Instrumentalist (Wales)
- 2019 Finalist - Creative Leadership Award, Australian Women in Music Awards
- 2019 Finalist - Excellence in Classical Music Award, Australian Women in Music Awards
- 2019 Nominated - Classical Act of the Year, National Live Music Awards
- 2020 Winner (Ensemble Offspring) - Sidney Myer Performing Arts Award
- 2021 Finalist - Limelight Artist of the Year
- 2021 Nominated (Ensemble Offspring) Best Independent Classical Album or EP, AIR Awards
- 2022 Medal of the Order of Australia (OAM)
- 2023 Australian Women in Music Awards - Creative Leadership Award (won)

==== APRA Art Music Awards ====
- 2007 Award for Excellence by an Individual
- 2012 Award for Excellence by an Individual
- 2016 Award for Excellence by an Organisation (Ensemble Offspring)
- 2016 Award for Excellence by an Individual
- 2021 State Luminary Award (Ensemble Offspring)

=== Fellowships ===
- 2005 Freedman Fellowship, Music Council of Australia
- 2014 Australia Council Music Fellowship, Australia Council for the Arts
