= Ash London =

Australian radio and television personality

- Born: Australia
- Spouse: Adrian Brine
- Children: 1
- Presenting career
- Previous shows: The Ash London Show (The Edge, More FM); The Loop (Network Ten); Take 40 Australia (Hit Network); Shazam Top 20 Countdown (Hit Network); Ash London LIVE (Hit Network); Grant, Ed & Ash (2Day FM); Game of Games (Network Ten)

Ash London is an Australian radio and television personality.

== Career ==
=== Television ===
In 2012, London was appointed co-host of Eleven's music video show The Loop with Scott Tweedie. She resigned in 2015 to pursue a career in radio.

In 2018, Ash co-hosted Network Ten's Game of Games with Grant Denyer.

She has been a guest on multiple episodes of Have You Been Paying Attention? and Celebrity Name Game.

=== Radio ===
in October 2014, London was appointed co-host of the Hit Network's Shazam Top 20 Countdown with Angus O'Loughlin. She remained in the position until she resigned in December 2015.

In October 2016, Ash returned to radio to host Ash London LIVE, a music-based show broadcast nightly on the Hit Network, which broadcast until Friday 3 September 2021.

In September 2018, London began filling in on 2Day FM's breakfast show alongside Ed Kavalee and Grant Denyer, after the departure of co-host Em Rusciano. In December, after three months of filling in, Ash was permanently appointed as a co-host with the show renamed to Grant, Ed & Ash. The show aired for 18 months before being cancelled in August 2019.

In August 2021, London announced her resignation from the Hit Network after 5 years with the network.

In June 2022, it was announced that London will fill in on the KIIS Network's Will & Woody whilst Will McMahon is on paternity leave.

In September 2026, London was announced as co-host of KIIS 101.1 Melbourne's breakfast program, Ash, Issie & Elliot, alongside former AFL player Isaac Smith and stylist Elliot Garnaut. The program will launch in October 2026, replacing The Kyle & Jackie O Show in the Melbourne market.

In February 2025, London joined The Edge in Auckland to host The Ash London Show with Harrison Keefe and Yasmina Coe. Ash has also hosted The Edge Breakfast Show with Clint and Dan while Meg was on maternity leave in July 2025 until when Meg returned later on the same year.

On October 26 2026, "Ash, Issie and Elliot" started the KIIS 101.1 breakfast show in Melbourne, replacing a Sydney rebroadcast of Kyle & Jackie O which finished earlier in the year.

== Personal life ==
London married Adrian Brine, a radio content director, in May 2018. They have 1 child.
