= Bushwhacked! =

- Genre: Children's Action-Adventure
- Directed by: Dan Goldberg
- Presented by: Brandon Walters (2012); Kamil Ellis (2014–); Kayne Tremills (2012–)
- Theme music composer: Michael Lira
- Country of origin: Australia
- Original language: English
- No. of series: 3
- No. of episodes: 39

Production
- Producers: Lester Jones; Dan Goldberg
- Editors: Nathan Mulready; Anthony Cox
- Running time: 30 minutes
- Production company: North One TV Australia

Original release
- Network: ABC Me
- Release: 6 October 2012 – present

Bushwhacked! is an Australian children's adventure television series which first aired on ABC3 on 6 October 2012. Bushwacked! follows hosts on weird and sometimes deadly wildlife missions around Australia.

== Hosts ==
- Kayne Tremills 2012–
- Kamil Ellis 2014–
- Brandon Walters 2012
