= What You Know =

What You Know may refer to:

- "What You Know" (T.I. song), 2006
- "What You Know" (Two Door Cinema Club song), 2010
- "What You Know", a song by The Levellers from the 1990 album A Weapon Called the Word
- "What You Know", a song by Onefour

== See also ==
- What do you know (disambiguation)
