= Ensemble Offspring =

Australian music ensemble

- Years active: 1995-present
- Website: ensembleoffspring.com

Ensemble Offspring is an Australian music ensemble. The group is led by artistic director Claire Edwardes, and features some of Australia's most innovative performers. The group has toured to locations such as Hong Kong, London and Warsaw, and have regularly featured at MONA FOMA, Sydney and Melbourne Festivals. As of 2018, Ensemble Offspring has premiered over 200 works in its 23-year history.

Together with Kamil Ellis it was nominated for the 2019 ARIA Award for Best Children's Album for Classic Kids: Music For The Dreaming.

== Members ==
- Claire Edwardes (percussion)
- Geoffrey Gartner (cello)
- Jason Noble (clarinet)
- Lamorna Nightingale (flute)
- Veronique Serret (violin)
- Zubin Kanga (piano)
- Bree van Reyk (drums, percussion)
- Blair Harris (cello)

=== Former members ===
- Damien Ricketson - composer, co-founder and co-artistic director (1995-2015)

== Discography ==
=== Albums ===
List of albums, with selected details
Title	Album details
Springtime	Released: February 2010; Label: Ensemble Offspring
Between the Keys	Released: 21 May 2013; Label: Ensemble Offspring
Fractured Again	Released: June 2013; Label: Damien Ricketson
Cycles and Circles	Released: 2015; Label: Ensemble Offspring
Noise Husbandry (with James Humberstone)	Released: 6 August 2016; Label: Ensemble Offspring
Offspring Bites 1	Released: 3 November 2017; Label: Ensemble Offspring
Classic Kids: Sounds Like Australia (with Luke Carroll)	Released: 6 July 2018; Label: ABC Music
Classic Kids: Music for the Dreaming (with Kamil Ellis)	Released: 5 October 2018; Label: ABC Music
Offspring Bites 2	Released: 21 July 2019; Label: Ensemble Offspring
Songbirds	Released: 12 June 2020; Label: ABC Music
Offspring Bites 3: En Masse	Released: 24 March 2021; Label: ABC Music
To Listen, To Sing – Ngarra-Burria: First Peoples Composers	Released: 2 December 2022; Label: ABC Music

== Awards and nominations ==
=== AIR Awards ===
The Australian Independent Record Awards (commonly known informally as AIR Awards) is an annual awards night to recognise, promote and celebrate the success of Australia's Independent Music sector.

Year	Nominee / work	Award	Result	Ref.
2023	To Listen, To Sing – Ngarra-Burria: First Peoples Composers	Best Independent Classical Album or EP	Nominated	

=== ARIA Music Awards ===
The ARIA Music Awards is an annual awards ceremony held by the Australian Recording Industry Association.

Year	Nominee / work	Award	Result	Ref.
2019	Classic Kids: Music for the Dreaming (with Kamil Ellis)	Best Children's Album	Nominated	
2023	To Listen, To Sing – Ngarra-Burria: First Peoples Composers	Best Classical Album	Nominated	

=== National Live Music Awards ===
The National Live Music Awards (NLMAs) commenced in 2016 to recognise contributions to the live music industry in Australia.

Year	Nominee / work	Award	Result	Ref.
2019	Ensemble Offspring	Live Classical Act of the Year	Nominated	
2023	Ensemble Offspring	Best Classical Act	Nominated	

=== Sidney Myer Performing Arts Group Award ===
The Sidney Myer Performing Arts Awards (created in 1984) recognise the essential role of arts and culture in affirming our sense of belonging and lifting our community spirit as a nation.

Year	Nominee / work	Award	Result
2020	Ensemble Offspring	Performing Arts Group Award	Nominated
