= Scott Tweedie =

Australian television personality (born 1988)

- Tweedie in 2020
- Born: 29 January 1988 (age 38); Brisbane, Queensland, Australia
- Education: St Joseph's College, Gregory Terrace
- Occupations: Television and radio presenter, reporter, producer
- Years active: 2009–present
- Employer: Network Ten
- Known for: The Loop; Prank Patrol; Australian Idol
- Height: 6’1

Scott Tweedie (born 29 January 1988) is an Australian television and radio host, presenter and producer. He has hosted on the E! Network in the United States and Network 10's The Loop and Studio 10. He has also hosted children's series Prank Patrol and the 2023 reboot of Australian Idol, alongside Ricki Lee Coulter.

== Early life and education ==
Tweedie was born in Brisbane, Queensland in 1988 and attended St Joseph’s College, Gregory Terrace, where he was captain of cross country in his senior year (2005). He lived in Sydney for a number of years and has two older sisters.

Tweedie graduated from university with a degree in commerce and finance and had initially planned on becoming a merchant banker.

== Career ==
Tweedie began his career as a radio presenter for Nova 106.9 in Brisbane. In 2009, he became a host on ABC3 children's series Prank Patrol, based on the original Canadian series. In 2011, Tweedie and Kayne Tremills became co-hosts for the Australian version of the medieval-themed physical kids game show Splatalot!, which aired on ABC3. In 2013, he hosted WAC: World Animal Championships, along with Amberley Lobo, again on ABC3.

In 2012, Tweedie and Ash London (later Liv Phyland) became co-hosts on Channel Eleven Australian television music program The Loop. Tweedie filmed over 400 episodes and interviewed international artists such as Katy Perry, Avril Lavigne, Matt Damon, Ed Sheeran and Tom Cruise.

In 2014, together with co-host Jessica Tovey and roving reporter Alicia Malone, Tweedie commenced a weekly movie show, Movie Juice, airing on One.

Tweedie made his acting debut in 2016, with a guest role as Derek Meeps in long-running soap opera Neighbours.

In 2018, Tweedie travelled to South Africa to host Edge of the Jungle, a behind the scenes online series of the Australian version of I'm a Celebrity... Get Me Out of Here!. He also joined Studio 10 as a reporter.

Tweedie next hosted Australia's Dancing with the Stars, during 2019, filling in for host Grant Denyer who was injured at the time. Later that year, Tweedie announced his resignation from Network 10 after 8 years with the network, to accept a new role overseas. He relocated to New York to host E! News, and Pop of the Morning with Lilliana Vazquez in 2020. Shaq labelled Tweedie "the world's sexiest Australian". During the COVID-19 lockdown, Tweedie hosted an Instagram Live series called HappE! Hour, in which he made cocktails and interviewed celebrities.

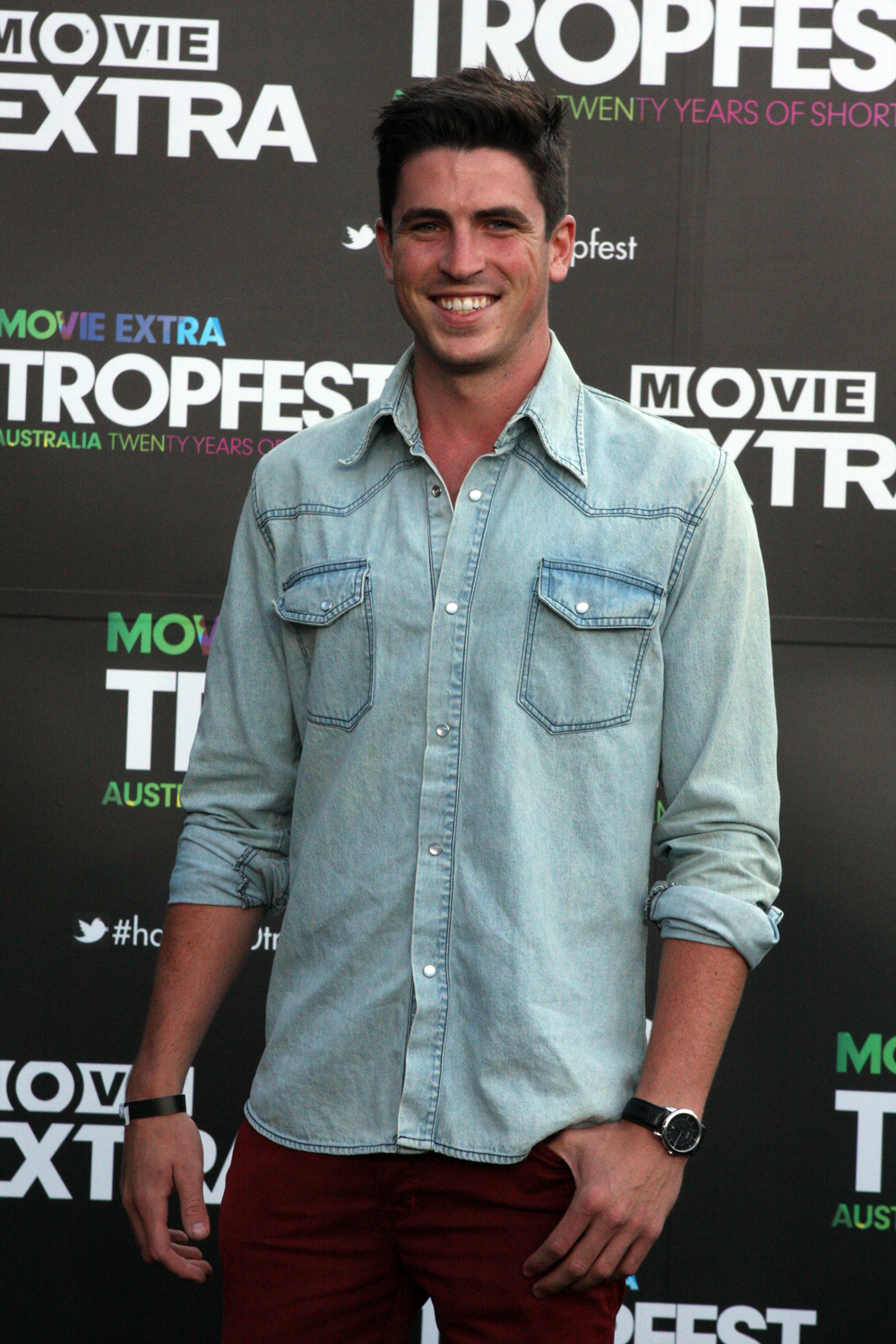
Scott Tweedie in 2012 at Tropfest in Sydney.

In late 2020, he relocated to Los Angeles after both E! News and Pop of the Morning were axed.

Tweedie returned to Network 10 in 2022, to temporarily replace Beau Ryan as host of The Amazing Race Australia 6, after some of the crew members tested positive for COVID-19. Later that year, he was announced as host of the Australian Idol reboot alongside Ricki Lee Coulter, which broadcast in early 2023, on the Seven Network.

== Personal life ==
Tweedie was in a relationship with model Georgia Berg for a number of years, which ended in 2018. He then dated architect Madeleine John from 2019 until 2021. In December 2025, Tweedie confirmed that he is in a relationship.

== Filmography ==
=== Television ===
Year	Title	Role	Notes
2009–2013	Prank Patrol	Host	
2011	Splatalot!	Host	
2012–2019	The Loop	Host	
2013	WAC! The World Animal Championships	Host	
2014–2015	Movie Juice	Host	
2016	Neighbours	Derek Meeps	1 episode
2018–2019	Edge of the Jungle	Host	Behind the scenes I'm a Celebrity online series
2018–2019	The 60th Annual TV Week Logie Awards	Host and presenter	
2018–2019	Studio 10	Reporter	
2019	Dancing with the Stars Australia	Guest Co-host	1 episode (filled in for Grant Denyer)
2019	Chris & Julia's Sunday Night Takeaway	Host	2 episodes
2019	Celebrity Name Game	Host	1 episode
2020	E! News	Co-host	
2020	Pop of the Morning	Co-host	
2022	The Amazing Race Australia	Guest Host	3 episodes (filled in for Beau Ryan)
2023–present	Australian Idol	Co-host	

=== Film ===
Year	Title	Role	Notes
2011	Yesterday is Here	—N/a	Composer
2018	Head Above Water	Tommy Lee	
