= Ruben Meerman =

Australian scientist, educator, and author

- Born: Ruben Meerman; 1971 (age 53–54); Vlissingen, Netherlands
- Other names: The Surfing Scientist
- Citizenship: Dutch, Australian
- Education: Kepnock State High School,
- Occupation(s): Physicist, Scientist, Presenter
- Website: Ruben Meerman - Official Website; Surfing Scientist on ABC

Ruben Meerman, most commonly known as The Surfing Scientist, is an Australian scientist, educator, author, and public speaker. He has appeared on Australian television shows to educate the public on science topics. Meerman often performs science demonstrations for school children, and appeared frequently on ABC's children's television show RollerCoaster until it ended in 2010. He often uses liquid nitrogen in his demonstrations. Meerman is a proud supporter of free education for all in the areas of literacy, math skills, and science skills. He was educated on the free Australian public education himself. Meerman is currently working on research into the science of weight loss, particularly what happens to fat when people lose weight.

== Early life ==
Ruben Meerman was born in Vlissingen, Netherlands in 1971 and moved to Bundaberg Queensland, Australia in 1980, eight days before he turned nine.

== Education ==
As a child in Australia Ruben attended Thabeban State School and later on Kepnock State High School. He studied a bachelor of physics in Queensland University of Technology

== Work ==
Ruben Meerman is best known for his work as The Surfing Scientist in encouraging school children to be excited about science as well as numeracy and literacy. He began his career working at Laserdyne Technologies at the Gold Coast as a physicist by making thin film optical coatings for lasers for use in medical, industrial and military applications.
