= Children's programming on ABC Television =

Australian television genre

ABC Television, the television network of the Australian Broadcasting Corporation, broadcasts two children's television channels as of 2021, with ABC Kids and ABC Family being the two most watched children's networks in the country.

== History ==
Prior to early 2009, there was a brand called ABC Kids (stylised as ab_{c}kids) which was separate from regular ABC Television/ABC1 and ABC2, containing all children's programming on the ABC. On 7 March 2005, ABC2 launched allowing for ABC Kids' programming to be broadcast for 13 hours a day across ABC1 and ABC2. To prepare for the launch of ABC3, the brand was completely removed and all children's programming coexisted with the rest of ABC1 and ABC2. However, during pre-schoolers' programming, the ABC network identities were replaced with more child-friendly animations, displaying a new "ABC For Kids" identity.

On 4 December 2009, the children's programming block on ABC2 was rebranded "ABC For Kids on 2" with new identities, schedule and watermark. All children's content aimed at school-aged children was removed, effectively making this a pre-schoolers' block. This was the same date as the launch of ABC3. In May 2011 this was again re-branded, along with a consolidation of kids programming on ABC2 as ABC4KIDS. This consolidation created a daily 13-hour block from 6 a.m. to 7 p.m. of pre-school programming on ABC2. On 2 March 2015 the channel was re-branded once again to ABC Kids.
