= My Great Big Adventure =

- Written by: Jack Yabsley; Colin Thrupp
- Presented by: Kayne Tremills
- Starring: Stephanie Bendixsen; Nancy Denis; Takaya Honda
- Theme music composer: Robert Taylor
- Composer: Alex Khaskin
- Country of origin: Australia
- Original language: English
- No. of seasons: 1
- No. of episodes: 10

Production
- Executive producer: Craig Graham
- Producers: Amanda Isdale; Colin Thrupp
- Running time: 30 minutes
- Production companies: Australian Broadcasting Corporation; Fredbird Entertainment; The Glorious Picture Company

Original release
- Network: ABC Kids; ABC3
- Release: 29 January 2012 – 24 March 2014

My Great Big Adventure is an Australian children's television series aired on ABC3 on 29 January 2012. It is presented by Kayne Tremills. The program deals with many life issues concerning teenagers.

A second series aired from 6 September 2014, with Kayne Tremills bringing along three presenter friends, Stephanie Bendixsen, Nancy Denis and Takaya Honda.
