= Pop of the Morning =

American talk show

- Starring: Lilliana Vazquez; Scott Tweedie; Victor Cruz
- Country of origin: United States
- No. of seasons: 1
- No. of episodes: 40

Production
- Production location: NBCUniversal/Comcast
- Camera setup: Multi-camera
- Running time: 60 minutes

Original release
- Network: E!
- Release: January 6 – March 12, 2020

Pop of the Morning is an American morning talk show that aired on E! on January 6 to March 12, 2020.

== Premise ==
The show covered pop culture and celebrity news and features celebrity interviews.

== Cast ==
The show was hosted by Lilliana Vazquez, Scott Tweedie and Victor Cruz.

== Production ==
The show premiered on January 6, 2020. On March 13, 2020, it was announced that effective immediately, the show would go on hiatus due to the COVID-19 pandemic. On August 5, 2020, E! canceled all three New York–based shows, along with E! News and In The Room.
