= Studio 3 (TV series) =

- Original line-up, 2009 (L–R: Amberley Lobo, Ben Crawley, Kayne Tremills)
- Genre: Children's; Live-action
- Presented by: List of Presenters
- Country of origin: Australia
- Original language: English
- No. of seasons: 7

Production
- Executive producer: Jan Stradling
- Production locations: Melbourne, Victoria, Australia
- Running time: 5 minutes

Original release
- Network: ABC3
- Release: 7 December 2009 – 18 September 2016

Studio 3 is an Australian children's television block which was premiered on ABC3 along with the channel's launch in 2009. The program premiered on 7 December 2009, originally presented by Amberley Lobo and Kayne Tremills. The block was composed of small hosted segments which serve as links between external programs on the channel. The show was removed when ABC3 rebranded as ABC Me on 19 September 2016. The final presenters were James Elmer, Grace Koh and Tim Matthews.

== Hosts ==
Original Replacement/Addition Final

Name	First show	Last show
Kayne Tremills	7 December 2009	November 2012
Amberley Lobo	7 December 2009	2014
James Elmer	4 April 2011	18 September 2016
Alfie Gledhill	December 2011	14 September 2012
Olivia "Liv" Phyland	December 2011	2015
Khaled Khalafalla	October 2012	March 2013
Grace Koh	June 2014	18 September 2016
Ivy Latimer	June 2014	2015
Tim Matthews	June 2014	18 September 2016

Notes

- The amount of hosts on the show at any one time has ranged from two to five, who usually host segments on screen in groups of two or three.
- Ben Crawley was included as part of the original host line-up as a roving reporter and news correspondent, occasionally doing reports.
- Other fill-in hosts and guests from other ABC3 programs have included Alannah Ahmat, Stephanie "Hex" Bendixsen, Steven "Bajo" O'Donnell, Joel Phillips, Nicole Singh, Mitch Tomlinson, Scott Tweedie, Hannah Wang
- Director and writer Dave Cartel appeared on screen from 2009 to 2013, usually as the character of the Janitor. He left to direct You're Skitting Me.
- Tremills returned as a guest in 2015 to promote My Great Big Adventure and Bushwhacked.

== Format ==
Studio 3 began as a daily variety style morning show, airing 7:00am daily. The show was designed to add personality to ABC3, with the hosts becoming the faces of the channel, offering the channel "the chance to speak with its audience". Since its inception, the show has branched out to air evenings as well as mornings.

The program was a television block, featuring hosts who present interstitial segments, linking external programs. The hosts can produce up to 55 linking segments each week, ranging from 1 to 3 minutes in length. The segments see the hosts presenting games, competitions, comedy skits, characters, and field segments. Also included are celebrity interviews and musical performances. Occasionally the show airs repeated segments branded as Studio 3 Gold (usually weekends). Studio 3 also serves as a space for introducing new ABC3 programs. The hosts may interview the casts from these shows or feature animators as guests.

Original hosts Lobo and Tremils presented a daily episodic comedy entitled Bitcom; a mockumentary miniseries. A special titled Bitcom and the Oblivion Ray aired in 2011 and featured other ABC3 hosts guest starring. A sequel entitled Airwaves featured subsequent hosts.

In 2013, TV Tonight's David Knox stated that Studio 3 was proving to be a "fertile training ground for its young presenters", suggesting the hosts would learn the skills and gain experience to later progress to other shows.

=== Special editions ===
A special edition entitled ABC3's Birthday Bash aired on 4 December 2010, commemorating the first anniversary of ABC3's launch. The special featured Lobo and Tremils counting down the top three moments of the year as voted across different categories.

Each year on Australia Day a Smackdown special is produced, a comedy spoof running for 20 minutes. The special is presented as a comedy-drama and brings together the ABC3 hosts to participate in an event or sport that children might also play on Australia Day.
