= Kamil Ellis =

Australian actor

Kamil Ellis (born c. 2002) is an Aboriginal Australian actor and musician. He is known for his roles in the TV series Cleverman, Nowhere Boys and The Tourist.

== Early life ==
Kamil Ellis was born around 2002. He is of Wiradjuri descent.

== Career ==
Ellis has appeared on TV in Cleverman, Nowhere Boys, Bushwhacked!, and SeaChange. He was an original cast member of the stage play The Secret River.

Ellis appeared as a police officer alongside Jamie Dornan and Danielle Macdonald in the limited series, The Tourist in 2022.

At the age of 21, Ellis played the role of a year 12 student in the 2022 high school drama series More Than This.

== Awards and nominations ==
Together with the Ensemble Offspring he was nominated for the 2019 ARIA Award for Best Children's Album for Classic Kids: Music For The Dreaming.

== Discography ==
=== Albums ===
List of live albums, with selected details
Title	Album details
Classic Kids: Music for the Dreaming (with Ensemble Offspring)	Released: 5 October 2018; Label: ABC Music

== Awards and nominations ==
=== ARIA Music Awards ===
The ARIA Music Awards is an annual awards ceremony that recognises excellence, innovation, and achievement across all genres of Australian music.

Year	Nominee / work	Award	Result
2019	Classic Kids: Music for the Dreaming (with Ensemble Offspring)	Best Children's Album	Nominated
