= Outback 8 =

- Countries of origin: Australia; United Kingdom
- Original language: English
- No. of seasons: 1
- No. of episodes: 8

Original release
- Network: Network Ten (Australia); BBC (UK)
- Release: 22 September – 10 November 2008

Outback 8 is a TV show that was broadcast on Network Ten in Australia and BBC in the UK in 2008. The show features two girls and two boys each from the UK and Australia and was set at the Agricultural Training College in Longreach, Queensland. There were 13 episodes, beginning on 22 September 2008 and every Monday for 13 weeks

== Synopsis ==
Outback 8 shows the children learning the skills to become jackaroos and jillaroos in an effort to be able to participate in a final muster of 200 head of cattle from hectares of land. The skills they learnt included horse riding, sheep shearing, pregnancy testing of cattle, bush survival skills, camping and mustering skills.

== Episode guide ==
| Episode | Content | Date shown |
|---|---|---|
| 1 | Leaving home and arriving at Longreach. Having their riding tests. | 22 September 2008 |
| 2 | How to feed horses and clean stables. The basics of a flight zone. | 29 September 2008 |
| 3 | Bush survival skills and spending a night camping out. | 6 October 2008 |
| 4 | Mini muster, cattle sorting and pregnancy testing. | 13 October 2008 |
| 5 | At the sheep station. | 20 October 2008 |
| 6 | The dunny race and girls vs. boys camping competition | 27 October 2008 |
| 7 | Longreach show ground preparation, cattle drafting challenge, surprise hospital trip. | 3 November 2008 |
| 8 | The hard labour of outback work – fence building, irrigation pipes, bail stacking and fire management. | 10 November 2008 |
