= List of programs broadcast by Disney Channel (France) =

This is a list of programs broadcast by Disney Channel (France). It does not include all but one Disney XD, Disney Junior, Disney Cinemagic, Toon Disney, Gulli, Jetix, or Playhouse Disney programs.

== Current programming ==
=== Original programming ===
- A Table les enfants
- Bande De Sportifs
- Best Bugs Forever (Bestioles Motel)
- Boy Girl Dog Cat Mouse Cheese
- Chez Rémy Tout le Monde Peut Cuisiner
- Disney Channel Talents
- En Route Champion!
- Like Me
- LoliRock
- Mère et Fille
- Miraculous: Tales of Ladybug & Cat Noir (Miraculous, les aventures de Ladybug et Chat Noir)
- Rolling with the Ronks! (Bienvennue chez les Ronks!)
- Sadie Sparks
- The Unstoppable Yellow Yeti (L’Incroyable Yellow Yeti)

=== Live-action series (from Disney Channel outside of France) ===
- Bia
- Bunk'd (Camp Kikiwaka)
- Find Me in Paris (Lena, Reve d'etoile)
- Gabby Duran & the Unsittables (Gabby Duran, baby-sitter d'extraterrestres)
- Just Roll with It (Une famille impredictabllè)
- Raven's Home (Raven)
- Sydney to the Max (Sidney au Max)
- Secrets of Sulphur Springs (Les Secrets de Sulphur Springs)
- Violetta
- Ultra Violet & Black Scorpion
- The Villains of Valley View (Les Super-Vilains de Valley View)

=== Animated series (from Disney Channel outside of France) ===
- 101 Dalmatian Street (101, rue des Dalmatiens)
- Amphibia
- Big City Greens (Les Green à Big City)
- Big Hero 6 (Baymax et les Nouveax Heròs)
- Carmen Sandiego
- DuckTales (La Bande à Piscou)
- Elena of Avalor (Elena d'Avalor)
- Go Away, Unicorn! (Va-ten Licorne!)
- Gravity Falls (Souvenirs de Gravity Falls)
- Hotel Transylvania (Hôtel Transylvaniè - La Serie)
- Hamster & Gretel (Hamster et Gretel)
- Legend of the Three Caballeros (La Legende de Trois Caballeros)
- Milo Murphy's Law (La Loi de Milo Murphy)
- Mia and Me (Mia et Moi)
- Moon Girl and Devil Dinosaur (Moon Girl et Devil le dinosaure)
- Phineas and Ferb (Phineas et Ferb)
- Pat the Dog (Paf, le chien)
- She-Ra and the Princesses of Power (She-ra et les Princesses au Pouvoir)
- Tangled: The Series (Raiponce, la série)
- The Owl House (Luz à Osville)
- The Ghost and Molly McGee (Molly McGee et le fantôme)
- Viking Skool
- W.I.T.C.H (Dimension W.I.T.C.H)

=== Disney Junior ===
- Art Attack
- Doc McStuffins (Docteur La Peluche)
- Fancy Nancy (Nancy fantaisie)
- Gigantosaurus (Gigantosaure)
- Goldie & Bear (Goldie et l'ours)
- Handy Manny (Manny et ses outils)
- Jake and the Never Land Pirates (Jake et les pirates du Pays imaginaire)
- Luo Bao Bei (Luo Bao Bei)
- Miles from Tomorrowland (Miles dans l'espace)
- Octonauts (Les Octonauts)
- Sofia the First (Princesse Sofia)
- Special Agent Oso (Agent spécial Oso)
- Sheriff Callie's Wild West (Shérif Callie au Far West)
- The Lion Guard (La Garde du Roi Lion)
- Vampirina (Vampirina)

== Former programming ==
- Andi Mack (Andi)
- Archie's Weird Mysteries (Archie, Mystères et Compagnie)
- Alex & Co.
- Austin & Ally (Austin et Ally)
- Backstage
- Best Friends Whenever (English language only)
- The Evermoor Chronicles
- Fish Hooks
- Friends: Girls on a Mission (Friends: Cinq Filles en Mission)
- Gamer's Guide to Pretty Much Everything (Guide de survie d'un gamer)
- Girl Meets World (Le Monde De Riley)
- Good Luck Charlie (Bonne Chance Charlie)
- Hannah Montana (English language only)
- Horrid Henry (Lucas la Cata/Lucas le Cata)
- Jessie
- K.C. Undercover (Agent K.C.)
- Kid vs. Kat
- Kim Possible
- Kirby Buckets (Also on Disney XD)
- Lab Rats (Les Bio-Teens)
- Life with Derek (Derek)
- Liv and Maddie (Liv et Maddie)
- Mermaid Melody Pichi Pichi Pitch
- Mónica Chef (Monica Chef)
- The Next Step (The Next Step : Le Studio)
- Rekkit Rabbit (Rekkit)
- Sabrina: The Animated Series (Sabrina, Apprentie Sorcière)
- Sabrina's Secret Life (Le Secret de Sabrina)
- Sonny with a Chance (Sonny)
- Soy Luna
- Stargate Infinity (Stargate: Le Dessin Animé)
- Stuck in the Middle (Harley, le Cadet de mes Soucis)
- The Suite Life of Zack & Cody (La Vie de palace de Zack et Cody)
- The Suite Life on Deck (La vie de croisière de Zack et Cody)
- That's So Raven (Phénomène Raven)
- Wakfu (Wakfu La Serié)
- Winx Club
- Wizards of Waverly Place (Les Sorciers de Waverly Place)
- Wolfblood (Wolfblood : le secret des loups)
- Zig & Sharko (Zig et Sharko)
- Zip Zip
