= What Do You Know? (TV series) =

- Genre: Children's game show
- Presented by: Ben Crawley
- Country of origin: Australia
- Original language: English
- No. of seasons: 1
- No. of episodes: 65

Production
- Executive producer: Michael Boughen
- Running time: 30 minutes
- Production company: Ambience Entertainment

Original release
- Network: ABC3
- Release: 27 December 2010

What Do You Know? is a children's television program first screened on the Australian children's channel ABC3 on 27 December 2010. It is hosted by Ben Crawley.

An episode of What Do You Know? was one of the lowest rating programs of the week, recording 6,000 viewers.
