= Schools Spectacular =

Australian student variety show

- Genre: Music performance
- Frequency: Annual event
- Locations: Afterpay Arena, Sydney Olympic Park (2016–present); Sydney Entertainment Centre (1983–2015)
- Years active: 42
- Inaugurated: 1983
- Most recent: 2025
- Previous event: 28 and 29 November 2025
- Next event: 27 and 28 November 2026
- Participants: 5,500+
- Attendance: 32,000+
- Website: www.schoolsspectacular.com.au

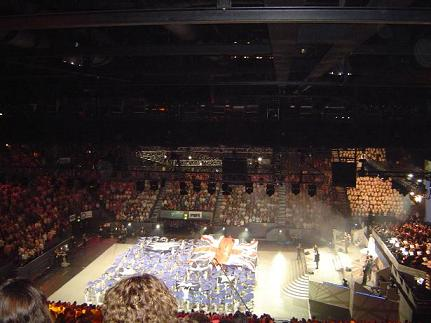
Australian Variety Show Schools Spectacular, 2005.

The NSW Schools Spectacular, commonly known as Schools Spec or just Spec, is an Australian variety show featuring more than 5,500 students from public schools across New South Wales. It has been performed annually from 2016 at Afterpay Arena in Sydney Olympic Park. It was previously held at the Sydney Entertainment Centre (later known as Qantas Credit Union Arena) from 1983 until 2015. The venue then permanently closed in early 2016.

The event is produced by The Arts Unit within the NSW Department of Education, bringing together students from across metropolitan, regional, rural and remote communities to perform in a professional arena environment alongside industry-standard technical production teams.

The NSW Schools Spectacular was broadcast by the Australian Broadcasting Corporation from 1984 until 2012, then by the Nine Network from 2013 until 2015. The Seven Network has been broadcasting the Schools Spectacular since 2016. Fifteen television cameras are placed in various vantage points throughout the arena. All four performances are recorded, and the best versions of each show segment are edited together and then aired in the television broadcast two to three weeks after the live event.

The actual performance is made up of many different pieces from a very wide variety of genres. A typical piece would have spotlighted vocalists singing on an elevated platform in the arena, surrounded by many dancers and actors. On the stage, the orchestra would be playing the instrumental part of the song while the choirs behind and next to the orchestra would be singing the chorus of the song. There are more than 400 audio inputs for microphones and musical instruments, and an amazing array of around 600 lights used throughout the show.

Each production features:

- A massed choir of thousands of students
- Featured vocalists and musicians
- Large-scale dance ensembles
- Drama and specialty performance items
- Student stage crews and technical teams
- Professional lighting, audio, staging, and multimedia production

Students rehearse throughout the year before coming together for arena rehearsals and performances.

The production aims to:

- Showcase excellence in NSW public school performing arts programs
- Provide students with professional performance and production experience
- Build teamwork, discipline, and confidence
- Offer pathways into creative and technical industries
- Celebrate diversity and inclusion across public schools

Participation includes performers as well as students working in backstage, audio, staging, and production support roles.

The show is all inclusive with featured acts including a D'Arts Ensemble promoting children with disability to join in the action. There are several areas for students to participate ranging from students studying HSC VET Entertainment to the Aboriginal Dance Company, Featured Dance, Hip-Hop, Musical Theatre, Tap, Jazz, Vocalists, Backing Vocalists to Core Choir and Mass Choir.

The first NSW Schools Spectacular was Schools Spectacular 1983 and was intended to be a sound test for the Sydney Entertainment Centre. Since then, the NSW Schools Spectacular has evolved significantly. The 2012 event included 3,600 students and 600 teachers from 400 schools in four performances viewed by 30,000 people. Schools Spectacular 2016 broke the Guinness World Record for "Largest Amateur Variety Act", with 5,500 performers.

Schools Spectacular has become a major cultural event within NSW public education, celebrating student talent while demonstrating the scale and quality of performing arts programs in public schools. For many students, participation represents a highlight of their schooling and a pathway into future creative careers.

The Victorian Government sponsors their own edition, which began in 2001, and the Queensland Department of Education has a version named "Creative Generation".

== Themes By Year ==
Each year, the Schools Spectacular follows a theme:

- 1993 – One Spirit
- 1994 – International
- 1995 – Hats Off To Australia
- 1996 – Get Set 2000
- 1997 – The Edge
- 1998 – Reaching the World
- 1999 – To Be Australian
- 2000 – The Entertainers
- 2001 – Celebrate!
- 2002 – By Invitation
- 2003 – 20 Years on
- 2004 – 21st Birthday
- 2005 – The Face of Australia
- 2006 – Shine
- 2007 – My Spec
- 2008 – The Spectacular Spirit
- 2009 – Reaching Out
- 2010 – Colour My World
- 2011 – Imagine
- 2012 – Our Time
- 2013 – 30 Spectacular Years
- 2014 – This Is Australia
- 2015 – This is Our World
- 2016 – Dream Big
- 2017 – Own The Moment
- 2018 – The Greatest
- 2019 – Stars
- 2020 – Remixed (Broadcast Special)
- 2021 – Spectacular Schools Inspired (Broadcast Special)
- 2022 – Creating The Magic
- 2023 – FabuloUS
- 2024 – All 4 One
- 2025 – Remarkable
- 2026 – Original

== Notable alumni ==
- Human Nature (band, Australian recording artists)
- Vanessa Corish (singer-songwriter, record producer)
- Nathan Foley (children's TV group Hi-5)
- John Foreman (musician, Australian Idol musical director, Schools Spectacular host)
- Jack Vidgen (Australia's Got Talent Winner, The Voice Australia Performer, Australian Recording Artist)
- Shannon Brown (The Ten Tenors)
- Paulini (Australian Idol 2003 finalist, Australian recording artist, Young Divas)
- Sabrina Batshon (Australian Idol 2009 finalist)
- Roshani Pridis (Australian Idol 2008 finalist)
- Anja Nissen (The Voice 2014 Winner)
- Trevor Ashley (Musical Theatre performer)
- Travis Collins (Golden Guitar Winner)
- The McClymonts (Golden Guitar Winner)
- Arlo Sim (The Voice Australia Season 10 Grand Finalist)
- Tsehay Hawkins (fourth and current yellow Wiggle)
- Iliysh Retallick (Australian Idol 2025 Runner Up)
- Catherine Laga'aia (Actress for Moana in Moana (2026 film))
