= Prank Patrol (Australian TV series) =

Australian children's television series (2009–2013)

- Scotty and the Ninjas
- Also known as: Prank Patrol: Road Trip (season 3)
- Created by: David Hansen
- Based on: Prank Patrol (Canadian TV series) by David Hansen
- Starring: Scott Tweedie; The Ninjas (Abbey Black and Ella Camp)
- Country of origin: Australia
- Original language: English
- No. of seasons: 3
- No. of episodes: 86 (list of episodes)

Production
- Running time: 25 minutes
- Production company: Active Television

Original release
- Network: ABC3
- Release: 4 December 2009 – 14 October 2013

Prank Patrol (known as Prank Patrol: Road Trip for its third season, also known as Prank Patrol Down Under in the UK) is the Australian version of the original Canadian series Prank Patrol. The show was made for the then-new ABC3 channel (now ABC Entertains) which specialised in children's programming. It is hosted by Scott “Scotty” Tweedie and produced by the ABC.

== Premise ==
The show follows Scotty and his ninjas helping children to pull off a prank against someone they know, such as a parent or friend. Scotty then takes the new recruit to their "HQ", where they establish a plan to prank their target. Scotty meets with real prank experts, such as special effects experts and makeup or costume artists. The new recruit calls their target to lure them into the prank. The prank builds to a climax, where the famous catchphrase "you've been pranked by the prank patrol!" is shouted by everyone in on the prank.

== Fillers ==
=== Recipe for a Prank ===
Similar to the original Canadian format this filler is an animated short of which explains how to set up one's own prank.

=== Ninjas on the Loose ===
The Ninjas usually go to a public place and commit a prank, whether it be hiding behind a park bench and making fart sounds or scaring strangers. The segments for this version in the first and second series were reused from the UK version of the show.

== Episodes ==
Series	Episodes	Originally released	
Series	Episodes	First released	Last released
1	26	4 December 2009	12 January 2010
2	38	19 September 2011	23 November 2012
3	26	16 September 2013	14 October 2013

== Production ==
The show is produced by the ABC and based on the original Canadian series. The first series consisted of 25 episodes of 25-minute lengths. Series 2 was announced on 15 April 2010 with another 39 episodes being produced. It was announced filming for series two would start on 2 August 2010 and film twenty-six episodes in Melbourne and thirteen in Brisbane.
