= ABC Entertains =

Australian television channel

- Logo used since 2024
- Type: General entertainment
- Country: Australia
- Broadcast area: Nationwide
- Network: ABC Television
- Headquarters: Sydney, New South Wales

Programming
- Language: English
- Picture format: 1080i HDTV

Ownership
- Owner: Australian Broadcasting Corporation
- Sister channels: ABC TV; ABC TV HD; ABC Kids; ABC Family; ABC News; ABC Australia

History
- Launched: 3 June 2024
- Replaced: ABC Me

Links
- Website: iview.abc.net.au/channel/abc2

Availability

Terrestrial
- ABN Sydney (DVB-T): 548 @ 12 (226.5 MHz)
- Digital terrestrial television: Channel 8 (Hobart); Channel 12 (Melbourne, Brisbane, Adelaide, Perth); Channel 30 (Darwin)
- Freeview: Channel 23

Streaming media
- ABC iview: ABC iview live stream

ABC Entertains is an Australian free-to-air television channel owned by the Australian Broadcasting Corporation. Its precursor, ABC Me, was launched on 4 December 2009 as ABC3, featuring programming aimed at primary school children. After a rebranding to ABC Entertains on 3 June 2024, the channel now focuses on general entertainment programming for mature audiences and older children (also airing on ABC Family).

== History ==
On 9 May 2024, it was announced that ABC Me, which was launched in 2009 (as ABC3) as Australia's first dedicated free-to-air children's channel, would rebrand to ABC Entertains on 3 June, shifting its format to general entertainment programming. The channel's relaunch was anchored by the premieres of new series of Interview with the Vampire and Wreck. Youth programming moved to ABC Family; although some programs still air in the morning (from 5:00–11:00 am), and the ABC Education block (from 9:00–11:00 am weekdays) largely remains untouched.

On 19 May 2025, it was announced that ABC Entertains, along with the ABC News channel, would be converted to MPEG-4 HD, with the switchover concluding on 26 June.

== Programming ==
=== Domestic ===
==== Children ====
- 100% Wolf: The Book of Hath
- Behind the News (Classroom, 2014–present; Newsbreak, 2009–2024)
- The Deep
- Hardball
- The Strange Chores

==== Adults ====
- Heartbreak High
- Rage (2014–present)

=== Foreign ===
==== Children ====
- Bionic Max
- Cloudy with a Chance of Meatballs
- Dragon Ball Super
- Hanazuki: Full of Treasures
- Horrible Histories
- Hotel Transylvania: The Series
- Kung Fu Panda: Legends of Awesomeness
- Mechamato
- Miraculous: Tales of Ladybug & Cat Noir
- My Little Pony: Friendship Is Magic
- Odd Squad
- Open Season: Call of Nature
- Operation Ouch!
- The Penguins of Madagascar
- Pokémon: Diamond and Pearl series
- The Rubbish World of Dave Spud
- Slugterra
- Star Wars: Young Jedi Adventures
- Total Drama Island (2023)
- Total DramaRama
- Transformers: EarthSpark

==== Adults ====
- Absolutely Fabulous (2024–present)
- Car SOS (2024–present)
- The Cleaner (2024–present)
- ER (2024–present)
- George Clarke's Amazing Spaces (2024–present)
- Live At The Apollo (2024–present)
- My Family (2024–present)
- MythBusters (2024–present)
- Not Going Out (2024–present)
- Penn & Teller: Fool Us (2024–present)
- Portlandia (2024–present)
- QI (2024–present)
- Speechless (2024–present)
- Would I Lie to You? (2024–present)
- Wreck (2024–present)
