= Good Game: Spawn Point =

- Logo used from 2018
- Created by: Janet Carr
- Presented by: Steven O'Donnell; Stephanie Bendixsen; Gus Ronald; Angharad Yeo; Gemma Driscoll; William Yates; Harry Jun
- Country of origin: Australia
- Original language: English
- No. of series: 16
- No. of episodes: 605

Production
- Producers: Eliot Fish; Luke Sherlock
- Running time: 15 minutes (2010–2011); 25 minutes (2011–2025)

Original release
- Network: ABC3 / ABC Me
- Release: 20 February 2010 – 6 December 2023
- Network: ABC Family
- Release: 23 August 2024 – 3 September 2025
- Network: ABC iview
- Release: 4 July – 22 August 2025

Related
- Good Game; GG: Spawn Squad

Good Game: Spawn Point (also known as Good Game SP, GG:SP, or simply Spawn Point) is an Australian video game review programme.

It is a spin-off (also described as a "sister program") of the original Good Game that only carries reviews of games ACB-rated as G or PG, and professes to be "For young gamers, by gamers". It debuted on ABC Entertains (then known as ABC3) on 20 February 2010. Spawn Point was originally hosted by Steven "Bajo" O'Donnell and Stephanie "Hex" Bendixsen from 2010 to 2016, when the latter departed; the former departed the following year. Later hosts included Gus Ronald, Angharad Yeo, Gemma Driscoll, William Yates, and Harry Jun. The series moved to ABC Family on 23 August 2024.

== Production ==
Spawn Point began in 2010, hosted by Steven O'Donnell and Stephanie Bendixsen. The ABC has described Good Game: Spawn Point as "featur[ing] a family friendly mix of gamer reviews, stories about gaming culture and plenty of audience interaction". PlayStrat said, "The standard Good Game edition is a more adult oriented series—which includes reviews of games that fall into more mature classifications (i.e. they include violence, sexual content, profanity). It's good, therefore, that the show has the Spawn Point variant to allow the younger crowd to get their fill as well".

The show originally ran for 15 minutes, but was extended to 30 minutes per episode from Series 2, Episode 21 on 2 July 2011. O'Donnell said, "The 30-minute show will allow us to review more games, produce more stories about game culture and delve deeper into gaming's rich history". Creator and executive producer Janet Carr said Spawn Point "is achieving a total TV share of 16.2% among children 5–12 years old and its average audience share is up 114% on series one. Series two has been extended due to the enormous response from the audience and it will give gamers more ways to interact with the show and make it their own". In 2011, Good Game: Spawn Point reached 166,000 viewers per episode.

As the show is "for younger gamers", it is not suitable to review games rated M, MA15+ or R18+. Bendixsen said "occasionally we might give you a glimpse of a mature title but only where it's necessary to make a point", and adds that the contentious content would always be excluded. On 1 July 2011, TV Tonight said "Together with ABC2's Good Game, Good Game: SP has reached over 1.3 million vodcasts, the most downloaded vodcasts of any ABC programme this year. ABC3's Good Game: SP website has recorded 254,000 visits and 1.6 million page views since January." O'Donnell named the "Ask Good Game" segment his "favourite part of the show, reading those letters and making the noises". He added "It's my dream that one day kids might look back on GGSP in the way I look back on shows from my youth, I hope we do it well enough that this might happen."

Bendixsen announced her departure from the show in January 2017; supporting host Gus Ronald and Angharad Yeo took her place. O'Donnell departed from the show in December 2017, and was replaced by Gemma Driscoll in 2018. Ronald departed the show in 2018, replaced by William Yates in 2019. Yates departed in 2020. In November 2022, Yeo announced her departure at the year's end. Harry Jun, who was a supporting host in 2023, joined Driscoll for a series of ten special episodes in 2024 and 2025, airing on ABC Family. The sixteenth season premiered on ABC iview in two parts of seven episodes—on 4 July and 22 August 2025—before airing weekly on ABC Family.

== Presenters ==
=== Main hosts ===
Former Current

Name	Nickname	First show	Last show
Steven O'Donnell	Bajo	20 February 2010	9 December 2017
Stephanie Bendixsen	Hex	20 February 2010	2 December 2016
Gus Ronald (Note: Ronald previously served as a supporting host from 2 July 2011 to 2 December 2016.)	Goose	18 February 2017	15 December 2018
Angharad Yeo	Rad	18 February 2017	17 December 2022
Gemma Driscoll	Gem	10 March 2018	22 August 2025
William Yates	Will	2 March 2019	12 December 2020
Harry Jun (Note: Jun previously served as a supporting host from 18 March to 16 December 2023. He continued as a host of GG: Spawn Squad after departing Spawn Point.)	Harry	23 August 2024	1 February 2025

=== Supporting hosts ===
Former Current

Name	Nickname	First show	Last show
Jackson Gothe-Snape	Ajax	1 May 2010	
Nathan Niguidula	Jax	19 February 2022	10 December 2022
Suraj Kolarkar	Dr. Deviser	18 March 2023	16 December 2023

Notes

- The show was also presented by D.A.R.R.E.N. the Robot from its inception to May 2022. (Note: "D.A.R.R.E.N." stands for "Digital Assistant for the Research & Regulation of Excessive Noobery", formerly "Data Analysing Robot for the Ruthless Extermination of Noobs".)
- The show was also been presented by AAISA the Robot from 2022 to 2023. (Note: "AAISA" stands for "Amazing Artificially Intelligent Science Assistant", formerly "Amazing Artificially Intelligent Scoop Assistant".)
- A puppet named Screen Goblin was introduced in 2024.

=== Guest hosts ===
- Kayne "Tremmers" Tremills (2010) hosted Series 1, Episode 19 (26 June 2010), replacing Bajo as he was at E3 2010.
- Pip Rasmussen (2017) hosted Series 8, Episode 19 (24 June 2017), replacing Rad and Goose as they were at E3 2017. Also guest hosted Series 8, Episode 35 (14 October 2017), to celebrate female developers for International Day of the Girl.
- Tim Mathews (2017) hosted Series 8, Episode 36 (21 October 2017).
- Bajo, Hex and Goose returned as guests for the 10th anniversary special on Series 10, Episode 20 (6 July 2019).
- Bajo and Hex returned as guests on Series 15, Episode 1 (23 August 2024).
- Series 16 features guest hosts for every episode, including Bajo on Episodes 3 and 10 and Harry on Episode 7 and 9.

== Series overview ==
Original logo

The first seven series were hosted by Hex and Bajo. Episodes originally ran for 15 minutes, and were extended to 30 minutes during the second series. The eighth series was exclusively referred to as Spawn Point in 2017, and hosted by Bajo, Goose and Rad as a trio. The ninth series returned to the original title and introduced Gem as a new presenter. The tenth and eleventh series were hosted by Rad, Gem and Will. The fourteenth series was solely hosted by Gem, with Harry and Dr. Deviser as supporting hosts. The fifteenth series, consisting of ten special episodes, was hosted by Gem and Harry. The sixteenth series was hosted by Gem and guest hosts, including Bajo, Harry, Chloé Hayden, and Keegan Palmer.

Series	Episodes		Originally released		
Series	Episodes		First released	Last released	Network
1	42		20 February 2010	4 December 2010	ABC3
2	42		12 February 2011	26 November 2011	ABC3
3	42		18 February 2012	1 December 2012	ABC3
4	42		16 February 2013	30 November 2013	ABC3
5	42		22 February 2014	6 December 2014	ABC3
6	42		21 February 2015	5 December 2015	ABC3
7	42	31	20 February 2016	17 September 2016	ABC3
7	42	11	24 September 2016	3 December 2016	ABC Me
8	43		18 February 2017	9 December 2017	ABC Me
9	41		10 March 2018	15 December 2018	ABC Me
10	42		23 February 2019	7 December 2019	ABC Me
11	42		22 February 2020	12 December 2020	ABC Me
12	40		13 February 2021	18 December 2021	ABC Me
13	44		19 February 2022	17 December 2022	ABC Me
14	40		18 March 2023	16 December 2023	ABC Me
15	10	5	23 August 2024	20 September 2024	ABC Family
15	10	5	5 January 2025	1 February 2025	ABC Family
16	14	7	4 July 2025		ABC iview
16	14	7	22 August 2025		ABC iview

== Segments ==
=== Reviews ===
Review segments are presented by the host throughout the show. Each time a current game is discussed while footage is shown to the viewers. Originally, at the end of the a game's segment, a rating out of 10 rubber chickens would be awarded, which in later seasons was changed to a star rating, before being changed again to a rating out of 5 rubber chickens.

==== Perfect scoring games ====
- Portal 2 (2011 – Bajo and Hex)
- Ori and the Blind Forest (2015 – Bajo and Hex)
- The Legend of Zelda: Breath of the Wild (2017 – Bajo and Goose)
- Cuphead (2017 – Bajo and Rad)
- Super Mario Odyssey (2017 – Rad and Goose)
- Ori and the Will of the Wisps (2020 – Gem and Rad)
- Animal Crossing: New Horizons (2020 – Gem and Rad)
- Ratchet & Clank: Rift Apart (2021 – Gem and Rad)
- Tunic (2022 - Gem and Rad)
- Mario + Rabbids Sparks of Hope (2022- Rad and Gem)
- The Legend of Zelda: Tears of the Kingdom (2023 - Gem)

== GG: Spawn Squad ==
GG: Spawn Squad is a spin-off series which premiered in 2022. Episodes run for 15 minutes and feature host Gem competing in video games against child guests or content creators. The second series debuted in 2024 and featured both Gem and Harry as presenters, airing on ABC Entertains rather than ABC Family. The series debuted on iview before airing weekly on ABC Entertains.

Series	Episodes	Originally released	
Series	Episodes	First released	Last released
1	20	23 September 2022	3 February 2023
2	40	27 March 2024	31 December 2024
3	36	5 April 2025	5 January 2026
4	36	1 April 2026	17 September 2026
