= Jeremy Ray =

Australian television presenter

- Born: Sydney, Australia
- Other name: Junglist
- Occupation: Online series
- Known for: Good Game

Jeremy Ray is an Australian television presenter, video game reviewer and DJ. He is best known by his nickname "Junglist", and for co-creating and presenting Good Game.

== Early life ==
Ray was born in Sydney, Australia. At a very young age, he moved to Dallas, Texas, with his parents where he lived for most of his youth. He attended an alternative boarding school in North Carolina before later returning to Australia.

== Career ==
=== Early career ===
Early in his career, he worked for an online games network called Wireplay where he provided technical support for their gaming connectivity client.

=== Good Game ===
Jeremy, together with series producer Janet Carr, submitted Good Game's proposal and made its pilot, having had a mutual friendship in the past playing against each other in online games starting off with Age of Mythology. On 19 September 2006 the show first aired on ABC TV with both Jeremy Ray and Michael Makowski hosting the episode.

In 2009 he co-wrote as part of the show the book The Good Game Gamer's Guide to Good Gaming along with Maurice Branscombe, Janet Carr, and Steven O'Donnell.

==== Departure from Good Game ====
In 2009, the ABC decided to run auditions for new hosts on ABC3. Stephanie "Hex" Bendixsen was announced with other hosts for ABC3, and was thought to be hosting Good Game: Spawn Point. However it was revealed on the show's official forum that Bendixsen would in fact be replacing existing host Jeremy Ray entirely on both the original and new program.

Ray claimed the dismissal was because "they wanted a girl on the show", and stated that "mass appeal" was a direct quote from that meeting. The network first claimed Jeremy would stay behind the scenes in a writing capacity, then stated he would not be working on the show due to holiday travel plans that conflicted with the show's schedule. It then made the statement: "The reason for replacing Jeremy Ray was ongoing behind the scenes performance-based issues". For his work in 2009, Ray was highly commended in the Best Gaming Journalist category at the Red Rock Consulting IT Journalism Awards, or "Lizzies", and nominated in the Best Reviewer category.

==== After Good Game ====
Since leaving Good Game, Ray has written a competitive gaming section for Australian video game magazine PC PowerPlay as well as acted as editor for Kotaku Australia and appeared on video game and technology review site Byteside. He was a frequent guest on The GameArena Podcast which led him to a project for Telstra BigPond's GameArena website with his own webshow '5-inch Floppy', still using his gamer tag "Junglist" while referencing himself as the host.

On 9 December 2010, Ray complained about the Australian Christian Lobby relating to the R18+ for video games debate on his blog. Being a practising Christian himself, he stated "Gamers are not just kids, they're also voting Australians. Some of them Christian. And games themselves are not all Halo – the medium is growing in artistic integrity every year. By not realising this when you speak for us, you not only make yourself look backward, you vicariously make US look backward, and it pisses us off."

Ray hosted some of the early episodes of game review show Save Point on One HD.

Since early 2017 he has been working with Snackable TV on a series called "Under control".

In September 2017, Ray was appointed managing editor for Fandom Australia. Ray told website Mumbrella in regards to being given the role, "I look forward to bringing my creativity and deep passion for entertainment, and games in particular, to further develop Fandom as a daily destination for fans in Australia as well as around the world."
