= Tulett =

Tulett is a surname. Notable people with the surname include:

- Ben Tulett (born 2001), British cyclist
- Darren Tulett (born 1965), English journalist
- Miles Tulett (born 1987), Australian television personality
