= Gamestah =

Australian shoutcasting and media organisation

The Gamestah logo

Gamestah, also referred to as Gamestah Radio, is an Australian Shoutcasting and media organisation, best known for their role as the commentators of the "Roffle Cup" segment of the Australian gaming television show Good Game. They have also covered many large electronic sports events such as World Cyber Games (both Singapore and Sydney, Australia) and Electronic Sports World Cup. The organisation is currently made up of more than 25 volunteers who use the Shoutcast plugin for Winamp, developed by Nullsoft, to broadcast commentary of online computer game matches, as well as LAN events. Recently, Gamestah was interviewed by Good Game as well as Tektime Radio, a radio station dedicated to gaming news and interviews in Melbourne.

== History ==
Gamestah was formed in 2003, after Return to Castle Wolfenstein players with the game-names "Russkie", "Spot" and "D-FENZ" wanted to begin a service for the Australian gaming community, to provide commentary of Return to Castle Wolfenstein matches that took place on gaming ladders such as GameArena and Netspace's "Gamespace" gaming ladder. Gamestah shoutcaster Stewart "Ej" Brumm revealed in an interview for TV show Good Game that "before Gamestah, shoutcasting in Australia was a very ad hoc thing." Through time and resources provided by volunteers, Gamestah quickly became well known through the communities which it had covered extensively. It became approved shoutcasters for GameArena in 2005, and became closely associated with GameArena and AusGamers, both run by Australian games software company Mammoth Media.

In 2008, Gamestah began providing videocasts of important matches as well as launching GTV-VOD, a video-on-demand service providing streaming video of its videocasts.

Toby "TobiWan" Dawson was involved with Gamestah in the beginning of his career.

== Covered games ==
Gamestah focuses on first-person shooters. The games that Gamestah cover include:

- Battlefield 3
- Battlefield 2
- Battlefield Bad Company 2
- Battlefield 2142
- Call of Duty series (including United Offensive)
- Counter-Strike: Source
- Wolfenstein: Enemy Territory
- Enemy Territory: Quake Wars
- Team Fortress 2
- Warcraft 3 series (including DOTA)
- Heroes of Newerth
- League of Legends
- Left 4 Dead

The group has also done some coverage of racing simulation games such as rFactor.

== Featured content ==
Aside from commentary of various online matches, Gamestah also provides some shows to fill up timeslots which are generally quiet:

- eSports weekly – A weekly show which currently through 2009 running and on its 17th episode, featuring "Bob", "Ej" and "Arseynimz", with guest appearances by "SuperRoach" for a tech spot.

The show like the other weekly formats covers mainly eSports-related news, with a large focus on CyberGamer leagues and its ladders.

- Craptastic Chatback – A weekly show which ran from late 2004 to late 2006 on Thursday nights, it was hosted by gaming commentators Ej and Bob. The show started off as a way of bringing IRC conversations to a different medium, the show quickly evolved into a general gaming show which hosted interviews of gamers and prominent gaming figures, skits and discussions. The show was frequently followed up with a "Game of the Week" shoutcast of an online match which was to take place after the show. The show is currently on indefinite hiatus.
- The Harry and Momo Show – A weekly show which ran from late 2006 to early 2007, it was hosted by gaming commentators "Harry" and "MomoWang". The show's premise was mainly situated with the popular first-person shooter game Battlefield 2, which Harry and MomoWang both frequently shoutcasted for. The content was mainly the same as Craptastic Chatback, however it was mainly focussed on Battlefield 2 and provided interviews and discussion of many events that are taking place in the Battlefield 2 community. It too was followed by a "Game of the Week" shoutcast which showcased a largely requested Battlefield 2 match. Harry had to withdraw from the show in early 2007 for personal reasons, which also put this show on indefinite hiatus.
- Gamestah Review Hour – A regular show which ran in 2005, the show reviewed the latest PC games which had recently been released.
