= Harry Jun =

Australian comedian and television host

- Jun in 2026

Harry Jun is an Australian comedian and television show host of Korean descent. He has performed at the Sydney Fringe, Sydney Comedy Festival, Melbourne International Comedy Festival, and Edinburgh Fringe Festival.

== Early life ==
Jun grew up in Wollongong, Australia when he was one of two students of Korean descent in his high school — the other being Jun’s brother.

His parents enrolled him in Korean school as a child, but he did not rigorously study Korean until he was in his early 20s and took an intensive language course at Sogang University in Seoul.

== Career ==
Prior to being a full-time comedian, Jun has worked as a high school English teacher for seven years and trained in teaching Japanese and Korean. He also worked as a wellbeing support adviser for a secondary school.

Jun is a cohost of Say Kimchi, a podcast by SBS Audio. He has been a host of ABC’s Good Game TV show, which reviews video games.

Jun has performed a one-hour show called Inside Jokes, Outside Voice at the Melbourne International Comedy Festival and the Edinburgh Fringe Festival. He also has performed a show called Two Wongs and a White with Chinese-Australian comedian Jenny Tian at Edinburgh Fringe Festival.
