= Good Game (TV program) =

Australian video game review television series

- Good Game logo (2014–2016)
- Created by: Janet Carr; Jeremy Ray
- Presented by: Jeremy Ray; Michael Makowski; Steven O'Donnell; Stephanie Bendixsen
- Country of origin: Australia
- Original language: English
- No. of series: 12
- No. of episodes: 419

Production
- Executive producer: Janet Carr
- Producers: Janet Carr; Eliot Fish; Ben Shackleford; Lin Jie Kong; Peter Burns; Jonathan Reardon
- Running time: 30 minutes 40 minutes (specials); 60 minutes (finales) (Note: Four episodes, from 22 July to 12 August, ran for 60 minutes, due to ABC2 rescheduling.)

Original release
- Network: ABC
- Release: 19 September 2006 – 12 December 2007
- Network: ABC2
- Release: 11 February 2008 – 6 December 2016

Related
- Good Game: Spawn Point; Good Game Pocket; Good Game Well Played; Good Game: Pocket Edition

Good Game is an Australian television gaming programme produced by the Australian Broadcasting Corporation (ABC), which was aired on ABC2 from 2006 to 2016. Created by Janet Carr, Jeremy Ray and Michael Makowski, included a mix of gaming news, reviews, and features. The original hosts were Jeremy "Junglist" Ray and Michael "Kapowski" Makowski; the latter was replaced by Steven "Bajo" O'Donnell in 2007, and the former by Stephanie "Hex" Bendixsen in 2009. Other onscreen presenters included field reporter Gus "Goose" Ronald and Dave Callan.

The show is named after the friendly phrase gamers traditionally say after completing a competitive match. The show's producers maintained an online presence with the audience, often directly communicating and taking feedback from viewers; audience competitions and polls were also held. In addition, a mobile application and a book were created by the production team, to further cater to the show's audience.

Good Game received generally positive reception, with the hosts and segments being the subject of much praise. The show also received multiple awards, and achieved the status as one of the most downloaded ABC shows. The show's popularity has resulted in four main spin-offs: Good Game: Spawn Point, a show for younger viewers broadcast on ABC ME; Good Game: Pocket Edition, which ran on ABC2 from February 2013 to May 2014; Good Game Pocket, hosted by Nich "NichBoy" Richardson, with daily episodes released on ABC iview and YouTube from 2015 to 2016; and Good Game Well Played, an online show focused on eSports and hosted by Angharad "Rad" Yeo, which ran from 2015 to 2016. Both Well Played and Pocket were previously hosted by Michael "Hingers" Hing. Two podcasts were also created: Good Game: Grandstand in 2012, and Good Game Roundtable Podcast from 2015 to 2016.

The show was cancelled in January 2017, after the ABC received news that Bendixsen and Richardson had been hired by Channel 7 for the gaming show screenPLAY. In 2019, Ronald began producing video game previews and reviews under the Good Game name for ABC iview and YouTube.

== History ==
=== Series overview ===
Series	Episodes	Originally released	
Series	Episodes	First released	Last released
1	13	19 September 2006	12 December 2006
2	15	20 March 2007	12 June 2007
Special		18 September 2007	
3	11	25 September 2007	12 December 2007
4	32	11 February 2008	24 November 2008
5	43	9 February 2009	14 December 2009
6	43	15 February 2010	6 December 2010
7	43	8 February 2011	29 November 2011
8	43	14 February 2012	4 December 2012
9	43	12 February 2013	3 December 2013
10	45	18 February 2014	9 December 2014
11	44	17 February 2015	15 December 2015
12	43	16 February 2016	6 December 2016

== Design ==
The Good Game logo used from 2008 to 2013

=== Writing and filming ===
Monday and Tuesday we film, and Wednesday is for extra bits and field shoots where Hex and I usually aren't required. Wednesday and Thursday are our review days, and during this time we also write and capture footage and check and tweak the previous week's edits. Fridays the show gets sound mixed and we have a production meeting and read all the reviews and talk about them. Then we log as much footage as we can and it all starts again. It's a very busy job, making two TV shows a week along with reviewing means there's not much time for dressing up, but we try to.

— Bajo's interpretation of the production schedule, interviewed by Kamidogu, 12 March 2011

Each episode of Good Game had a three-week production schedule. Week one was pre-production, where games were played and reviewed, and any segments appearing in the episode are written. A rundown was made, allocating the minutes of the episode to each review and segment. Filming occurred early in week two, as well as collation of any gameplay capture necessary for the episode. The episode was then edited throughout week two, for finalisation early week three. After airing in week three, post-production involves putting the episode online, finalising copyright information, etc. The weeks overlap for consecutive episodes (i.e. post-production for episode 1, filming for episode 2, and pre-production for episode 3 all occur in the same week).

The show was shot and edited in standard def 576i PAL, as "all of ABC2 (and most other free to air channels) are transmitting in Standard Def." Episodes are then dubbed onto Betacam tape for transmission and the ABC Tape Library and uploaded onto Good Game's YouTube channel in upscaled 720p. Both Good Game and Good Game: Spawn Point are filmed in the ABC building located in Ultimo, Sydney.

Since 2009, there were at least 43 episodes each series, lasting from approximately February to December. Series 4 had 32 episodes, while series 1–3 had around 13 each, and series 10 had 45. In 2014, the show updated its logo and opening credits.

Mondays and Tuesdays we shoot both shows (Good Game and Good Game: Spawn Point), Wednesdays and Thursdays we play the games for the week, write the reviews and then capture and log all the gameplay footage for the editors. We'll also check the review from the previous week's game that's set to go in this week's show. Friday we have a big production meeting, and we have a kind of cool ritual where we all watch the sound mix together. Over the weekend we tend to play a bit more and capture any additional footage needed — then the whole process starts again on Monday.

— Hex's interpretation of the production schedule, interviewed by Kamidogu, 12 March 2011

Hex said, "It takes a week of long hours and hard work to put together a review on the show. Gaming, capturing all the game footage, logging all the footage, writing the review, re-writing, editing, filming, re-editing... the finished product is something I'm really proud of." Bajo described the editing process as "a bit like Machinima". Both he and Hex checked edits remotely during the period of the week when they had finished their filming and the rest of the crew "shoot field stories and finish off the rest of the show". Hex said that during the playing of games and filming she became quite attached to her avatars and wanted to show off what her own character did. Hex says, "We've tried our best on the show to present both sides of the argument in any stories we've done". Bajo explained: "Mondays we finish of reviews, log footage, swap games, read scripts and sub everything after a production meeting, Tuesdays we make GG and GG: Pocket, Wednesdays are GGSP and any green screen stuff, then Hex and I are off to review for the rest of the week, while the gang shoot field stories and finish off the rest of the show. We check edits remotely usually which is my favourite part of the job. changes week to week but that's the general schedule" Bajo has stated that "often segment ideas are pretty spontaneous". When asked about taking on Good Game: Spawn Point as well as the original show, Bajo responded: "we're busier than ever, but we've got things down to a pretty tight production schedule now".

=== Philosophy ===
According to series producer Janet Carr, making the show was "an immense challenge, but... great fun". In response to receiving a Lizzie Award, she said, "Being acknowledged like this is just the icing on the cake. We have a very small, hardworking team, and this award is dedicated to everyone who has helped make Good Game the show that it is." Bajo has said, "There's lots of late nights for all of us, so the show receiving these awards has been really uplifting." In fact, the show has explained via their Facebook page that the cast and crew have sometimes had all-nighters in order to wrap up episodes in time for their broadcast dates. Bajo explained, "It's such a team effort [so] it would be unprofessional and incorrect to take too much of that kudos... I think we're our own worst and best critics... we know if something worked or if it didn't so we're always trying new things."

Both shows aimed to be inclusive, with Hex stating that while the team tended to aim for a gaming audience, "there's something about videogames that's just really compelling to watch, and people who aren't even involved in games or who don't understand half the jargon" get really involved.

The individual personalities of the hosts was regarded as important to contextualising their reviews. Hex explained that by observing her and Bajo's passion for games they enjoy and fanboy/girl over, viewers can build an attachment to them as people and know what new releases will excite them. Hex said what makes a good game is "a good story... intuitive controls – we're at a level of technology now where there really is no excuse for clunky controls in games... [and] pretty graphics – our standards for graphics have just gotten so high." Bajo says, "It's always gameplay for me. I don't care what the game is about, if the gameplay is engaging, challenging, and interesting to me, I will play the hell out of it and I'll love it. Second, for me it needs a good story. I'm also a graphics whore, I just need it to look good." Bajo and Hex stressed that there is no such thing as a "boy's game" or a "girl's game", and that one should decide to play a game merely based on how good it is.

== Presenters ==
The show's hosts went by their gamertags on the show as opposed to their real names. Some are based on childhood nicknames while others were created for Good Game.

Both Bajo and Hex were involved in a number of shows and events outside Good Game, including hosting an episode of the ABC music video show Rage on 19 June 2010. In 2013, the two hosts became ambassadors for the national schools filmmaking competition "Screen It". In 2014, they spoke at the Perth Writers Festival at the University of Western Australia, with the creators behind the hottest games in a series of talks entitled "The Game Changers". They also hosted the 2014 MCV Pacific Awards for gaming.

=== Main hosts ===
==== Bajo ====
Steven "Bajo" O'Donnell (Series 2–12) took on the role as host following the resignation of Mike Makowski. On 9 March 2007, it was announced that he would be the new co-host. He later described the experience of joining the show as "a dream come true. It felt perfect for me. It had all my interests in one little basket, creative control in a collaborative team, and also I was getting to the point of giving up. The timing was perfect and unbelievably lucky." He had been trying to get a job in film and TV for about 7 or 8 years, and had seen the show before, so accepted the open call-out which involved "writing a review and doing a DVD presentation." He said he got his "dream job" due to "luck and persistence". He explains, "Gaming was about 50% of my life [before I joined Good Game], mainly PC gaming but I grew up with all the consoles... Working on the show has really opened up more genres to me that I never got into as much." He described the progression from unemployed actor to host of an award winning show in 2 years as "rewarding, fantastic, exciting and relieving." Bajo's first gaming memory was of Ms. Pac-Man. When explaining to other what he does for a living, Bajo feels the need to defend it, explaining that "it's actually really hard work".

==== Hex ====
Stephanie "Hex" Bendixsen (Series 5–12) took over the role from Junglist in time for series 5. Bendixsen had also auditioned for ABC3, but won the role on Good Game after approaching Bajo at Supanova as a fan, and being told Good Game was looking for someone. She sent in a series of reviews, the style of which she said she already knew how to do having already watched the show for a couple of years. She later did a screen test and ended up getting the job "quite quickly". Her first episode was on 26 October 2009. Hex got into games relatively late as she did not have a gaming household. Her first games were MUDs – specifically the game Lensmoor which she started playing at age 15), and enjoyed as it was like "collectively writing a book". Hex says she is okay with the harder parts of production as they are a part of her job. She said she finds great satisfaction in seeing a completed show go to air as so much time and love has gone into it. Hex states that, "The only thing that's sometimes difficult is that I have less time to play the games that I want to play recreationally, because the games I'm reviewing for work take priority." While she is happy to weigh in on gender-related issues, she also acknowledges that she does not want to be a "poster girl" for it and instead wants to be thought of as "a PERSON who just enjoys gaming".

==== Junglist ====
For all sorts of reasons we are unable to tell you things that have happened over many months inside Team Good Game which have impacted on the production. That's just real life folks. We know it leaves many questions unanswered but we have reached that point where we really can't say any more than that. But we can tell you this much... The decision to take Junglist off air was not forced upon us by ABC Management and it's one that is fully supported by all the GG team. We are gutted that it has come to this but in our opinion it absolutely had to happen.

— Team Good Game (Syd, Bajo, Moe, Tuk, Gog, Mafia, Jeremy Pencil, Palindrome), Discussion: Statement from the team...., ABC Message Boards, 29 Oct 2009

Jeremy "Junglist" Ray is the co-creator of Good Game and co-hosted the show from 19 September 2006 to 19 October 2009 (series 1–5).

In 2009, the ABC decided to run auditions for new hosts on ABC3. Stephanie "Hex" Bendixsen was announced with other hosts for ABC3, and was thought to be hosting Good Game: Spawn Point. However, it was revealed on the show's official forum that Bendixsen would replace existing host Jeremy Ray on both the original and new programme.

Ray claimed the dismissal was because "they wanted a girl on the show", and stated that "mass appeal" was a direct quote from that meeting. However, fellow co-creator Janet Carr of the show replied back on that statement saying, "Regardless of what Jung might say GG will NOT be dumbed down and I state again, the decision was nothing to do with bringing in a girl... I'm a girl and I started this show – I don't care about the gender of the presenters – I just care about having the best people working on it." The network first claimed Jeremy would stay behind the scenes in a writing capacity, then stated he would not be working on the show due to holiday travel plans that conflicted with the show's schedule. It then made the statement saying, "The reason for replacing Jeremy Ray was ongoing behind-the-scenes performance based issues."

In response to questions regarding tweaks made to the show due to the changeover, Bajo replied, "We haven't changed anything in particular since Hex joined us – the feel of the show is obviously quite different with a new host, but we've always mixed up segments and tried different ideas on a regular basis to keep things fresh. This year we've had much more time to review games than before, and more of the team are getting involved in other segments and trying their skills at different jobs which is wonderful to see." When asked about Junglist, Hex replied "I have seen [Junglist] at events from time to time. We're not super-best-friends. But we're cool."

==== Kapowski ====
Michael "Kapowski" Makowski was the inaugural co-host of the show, and left the role at the end of series 1 after announcing his resignation via Good Game's online forum on 14 February 2007; he returned for an interview for the 100th episode on 24 August 2009.

=== Supporting hosts ===
==== Goose ====
Gus "Goose" Ronald (Series 7–13), was the show's field reporter. His addition to the team was announced on 17 June 2011, after a callout via a Facebook post on 21 March 2011. He worked as a freelance video editor in Melbourne before joining the show, and edits some segments for the show. Goose added that he's "been a gamer [his] whole life and a big fan of the show." He described his job saying, "I do all the stories that are NOT in the studio. While Bajo and Hex prepare and present all the reviews and news, they send me out to do the topical stories out on location." His hosting role evolved, doing numerous segments and occasional reviews, and as of 2014 was the newsreader for both Good Game and Good Game: Spawn Point.

==== D.A.R.R.E.N. ====
D.A.R.R.E.N. – an acronym for Data Analysing Robot for the Ruthless Extermination of Noobs (Series 7–12), is the robot co-host for Good Game: Spawn Point. He has also had supporting role appearances on the main show since series 7—mostly in the season finales, but also as a cameo in various episodes. D.A.R.R.E.N. was announced via a Facebook video post made on 19 February 2010. When asked about the voice over artist for D.A.R.R.E.N., Bajo simply replied "Darren is eternal". He is voiced by James Cottee.

==== P_Nutz ====
A former host, P_Nutz, resting on a coat hanger in the Good Game offices. P_Nutz caused much annoyance from viewers of the show, which then forced the Good Game crew to remove him from the show.

P_Nutz was a yellow puppet introduced during the pilot episode in May 2006; this supporting host of season 1 drew a lot of criticism and debate from viewers over its antics, seemingly aimed at a younger demographic. Some likened it to a monkey modeled on Agro of Agro's Cartoon Connection, some believed P_Nutz's presence would prevent the show from being taken seriously, and others were simply annoyed by its presence. A poll was conducted on the official Good Game website regarding his appropriateness in the programme, and the results suggested he was inappropriate. It was decided he should die while defusing a bomb in Counter Strike, and a Flash animation of this – made by community member and animator Ross O'Donovan, known as "RubberRoss" – was aired in the final episode of series one. He has still remained on the show as a running gag, such as in the reviews of Zack & Wiki: Quest for Barbaros' Treasure, Killing Floor and Ghostbusters: The Video Game. One of the variants of the "technical difficulties" screen includes his face.

==== Other supporting hosts ====
Miles "Dr. Daneel" Tulett appeared in the first 2 seasons of the show as an expert on technical issues, and had various computer-related segments. He left the show to pursue his studies at university and because he felt that his segment was no longer hardware-oriented, and returned for an interview for the 100th episode on 24 August 2009. Matthew "Aiyiah" Lee ran the So You Think You Can Game segment on series 2 of Good Game. Sheridan "Lux" Leanda had segments on topics such as cyber bullying and girls in gaming throughout series 3. Tracey "Rei" Lien was first introduced in series 5, episode 3 as the show's field reporter. She was already a practicing journalist and games writer prior to taking up the role of field reporter,. On the series 5 Christmas special in 2009, she announced she'd be leaving to France to further her studies. Her role was passed down to Ajax in 2010. She returned occasionally to do reports from European countries such as Gamescom 2010 in Cologne, Germany. She was also seen during series 7, episode 20 in the E3 special. Jackson "Ajax" Gothe-Snape was a field reporter introduced for series 6. There are also a series of freelance animators who work on the show; a job opportunity was sent out in 2011. Michael "Hingers" Hing was the first host of Good Game Pocket; his involvement as the host was announced on 4 February 2015. Following his departure from Pocket, he began hosting Good Game Well Played; his final episode was in July 2016. Nich "NichBoy"" Richardson was the host of Good Game Pocket. Janet Carr, creator of Good Game, approached Richardson while he was still working on The Roast, created and co-produced by himself. He has also guest starred on Good Game occasionally.

=== Guest hosts ===
Andrew "Bindi" Hansen guest hosted in three episodes from 2010–2012 while either Bajo or Hex were at the Electronic Entertainment Expo. He originally guest appeared on 6 October 2008 in series 4, episode 25. Comedian Dave Callan has continued involvement with Good Game, doing segments and reviews since 2012. This includes reviews for Kid Icarus: Uprising, Heroes of Ruin and various dancing games including Just Dance 4 and Dance Central 3 among others. He also is the host of a 2013 segment called Laying Down the Lore with Dave Callan where he talked about The Elder Scrolls, Resident Evil and Assassin's Creed as well as later hosting an episode alongside Bajo while Hex was at E3 in 2013. He appeared in the 2014 Christmas special episode, writing a letter to Santa requesting more dancing in video games.

== Format ==
=== Game reviews ===
In early series, reviews were primarily conducted by one host, with the other not required to play the game. In more recent series, both of the hosts equally present the review, with certain games being reviewed by only one host – such as Bajo's review of Dark Souls II or Goose's review of Fract OSC. Gameplay footage is shown while the game is discussed, and is used to illustrate points as well as provide humorous punchlines. The crew are often sent games by developers or studios ahead of their release date for them to play and review. The date they arrive comes down to the platform, game, publisher, and how persistent the show is with their requests. Bajo explains, "We never review the game unless we're told it's 'review code'." The crew have a few determining factors in choosing games for review, and aim to look at games relevant to their audience. This includes AAA titles, and any releases that are generating buzz. The team are always on the lookout for experimental or indie games, especially if they are generating interest within the Good Game offices or wider gaming community.

A whiteboard grid is used to plan episodes a few weeks in advance, based on release schedules, events like E3, interviews, and other segments. They try to time reviews so they occur before or in the week the game is released, however, being a television show with a longer production period than most online content, this is not always possible. One challenge is having publishers provide games early enough to be reviewed and filmed in time. Often they receive debug code which can only be played on debug consoles, and developers are usually still working out kinks, so will provide a list of bugs for the team to take into account. Good Game also have to be wary of embargo dates as reviews can't be broadcast before then. Even if the embargo ends a few hours after a Good game episode, the review must be held back for a week. Sometimes, Good Game can only get a copy of the game after it is released, and Bajo points out that while this is sometimes due to random factors it can also be a sign that the game is bad. They try to avoid having too many of the same type of game in each week, and try to include games on all consoles. They hope that all this will ensure there is something for everyone.

Rubber chickens served as the rating system for the show until February 2015. As such, at the end of the review a rubber chicken rating (a number out of 10) is given to the game. The games that have received a perfect score (10 out of 10 rubber chickens from season 1–10; 5 out of 5 stars from season 11 onward) from both hosts include: Super Mario Bros., The Legend of Zelda: Ocarina of Time, Portal 2, Batman: Arkham City, Mass Effect 3, Black Mesa, Halo 4, Tomb Raider, The Last of Us, Grand Theft Auto V, Dragon Age: Inquisition, The Witcher 3: Wild Hunt, Batman: Arkham Knight, The Beginner's Guide, Rise of the Tomb Raider, and Uncharted 4: A Thief's End. The Stanley Parable is also notable for receiving 10 out of 10 rubber chickens from Goose, who reviewed the game independently. The lowest rated games include: Doctor Who: Return to Earth (Bajo – 1; Hex – 1.5), Naughty Bear (Bajo – 1.5; Hex – 1), Muscle March (Bajo – 1; Hex – 0), and ET (Bajo – 1; Junglist – 0). From time to time, unorthodox ratings have been given to games. These include when Bajo gave a "not sure" and Hex gave an 8791 for Robot Unicorn Attack, when Bajo gave a "wispy breeze" and Hex gave a "picture of a tree" for Dear Esther, and when DayZ (a Mod for ARMA 2) was not rated and the score screen at the end of the episode showed the death screen from game. In February 2015, the scoring system was changed from a 10 Rubber Chicken variation, to a five-star system, with the Rubber Chicken still being referred to, via the "Golden Rubber Chicken" award, given to games receiving perfect five-out-of-five scores from both presenters. The establishment of this new scoring system differs between classic Good Game and Good Game Spawn Point. The former implies that the new method is derived from the now-concluded "At the Movies" scoring system, also based around five star ratings, while the latter attributes the updated scoring system to DARREN taking a symposium on scoring methods.

=== Other segments ===
There have been a variety of other segments that pad out episodes and explore the wider gaming world. These include:

- News – Video game culture related news.
- Name the Game – A gaming trivia segment where footage of a game is shown and the audience is asked to guess what it is.
- Equip This – Hosted by Goose. Explores various objects across numerous video games.
- Postcards From – Goose sends viewers a postcard from a particular video game locale.
- Industry Interviews – Interviews with games developers.
- Backwards Compatible – Started in series 4. Explores the best and worst of gaming history, and how this has helped shape the future of gaming.
- Evolution of a Genre – A series 3 segment similar to Backwards Compatible.
- Ask Good Game – Started in series 5. Q&A with the hosts answering community submitted questions.
- Great Gaming Moments – Displays and analyses a 'classic gaming moment'.
- Pile of Shame – Started in series 6. Asks developers what game they still haven't finished playing.
- My First Love – Started in series 7. Asks developers what is the first game they fell in love with.
- Gamer Tonight – A fictional flash animated talk show starring Richard Farkas from the "Win the Beast" entry, "The Pitch", involving interviews with a different genre of gamer each segment. Six segments aired in series 2 with another eight aired in series 4.
- Tiny Power – An animation by Australian animation studio Studio Joho based on the mobile game Tiny Tower. Began in series 7 with a season parodying popular media. From series 8 onward the plot followed group of game developers. The Tiny Power ran for five seasons, and was voiced by members of the Good Game team.
- Roffle Cup – a multiplayer match of a specific game (past cups have featured Counter-Strike, Age of Empires, and Wii Bowling) with commentary usually done by commentators from gaming SHOUTcast organisation Gamestah.
- The Team – Machinima – A series 1 specific segments, replaced by Gamer Tonight in series 2.
- Build a Machine – Hosted by Miles "Dr. Daneel" Tulett, he explained how to install computer hardware.
- Ask the Doc – ReplacedBuild a Computer, and saw Daneel helping with technical issues.
- MeatSpace – Started in series 2. A Lego stop animation created by community member Nate "Blunty" Burr, revolving around two friends and their gaming related incidents.
- Ultimate Showdown – A 'best of' style segment related to games, which looked at specific features like boss fights and opening sequences, and encouraged forum participation.
- So You Think You Can Game? – Hosted by Matthew "Aiyiah" Lee divulge hints and tips for specific games, and set a challenge for the featured game.
- Quarter Circle + A – Started series 3. A series of primarily animated video game parodies created by Rob Moffett and Benjamin Baker.
- A Cartridge Affair – A parody of the show A Current Affair, was a humorous news spin-off about a different game subjects.
- Fatal Rage of Conflict – An animation set in a 2D side-scrolling fighting game.
- WTF? (What Were They Thinking?) – Started in series 5 as a platform for Bajo and Junglist to criticise a game and question its existence.
- 5-Up – Started in series 6. Counted down the top five in gaming related subjects, including top five weapons or RTS strategies.
- The Game Dev. Story – Started in series 7. A short look at the history of a successful game developer.
- Fanboys vs Haters – A segment where viewer responses to a game are discussed by the hosts.
- Deep Space Discs – Asked developers what three games they would take with them if they were to go on a deep space adventure.
- My Gaming Hero – Started in series 8. Asked developers who their hero in the gaming industry is.
- My First Gig in Gaming – Started in series 9. Asked developers what their first job in the gaming industry was.
- This is Your EXTRA Life – Hosted by Goose. Character studies of someone featured in a game reviewed in the episode.
- IMO – Started in series 12. A segment where Goose shares his opinion on a variety of aspects of the gaming world (e.g. Early Access games, movies based on games).

=== Special episodes ===
Good Game occasionally airs themed episodes. Good Game in Space, which aired on 23 August 2010, was an episode dedicated to Space-themed games and sci-fi references. Decades in Gaming looked at the '80s, '90s and '00s to try to find the best decade for gaming. Survival Special reviewed various zombie related games, and included an extended Goose feature story about survival games. Mental Health Special aired in 2014 as part of Mental Health Week, and featured reviews of games that deal with mental health issues, as well as feature stories on gamers with mental illnesses. There have also been various Christmas specials, which often include a blooper reel. In 2012, Good Game held a special 'up late' episode, which aired at 11:00pm due to the live coverage of the 2012 Summer Paralympics. In 2014, both Bajo and Hex presented their own special episodes in addition to regular programming, providing insight into each host. This was followed by The Good Game Top 100 – a viewer voted countdown of the top 100 games of all time.

== Relationship with audience ==
As well as providing audience participation opportunities for its viewership, Good Game maintains a uniquely open relationship with them. Good Game explains that they "take all suggestions & feedback seriously and, in fact, base the show around it." Upon learning of the show's 2008 Lizzie award wins, Amanda Duthie, Head of Arts, Entertainment and Comedy at ABC TV said, "The success of this breakout ABC2 program needs to be shared with our die-hard user-audience who are a significant part of the creative and editorial process – active on posting boards, contributors of video segments and accepting of experimental programming styles such as machinima – the audience is a true collaborator and unsung hero". Upon accepting the award the previous year, Junglist said: "Good Game has a great fan base, and we wouldn't be here today if it wasn't for our devoted audience... We're glad that people like what they see, and we hope we can keep bringing the gaming goodness for many years to come."

Janet Carr told News.com.au, "When we first started [Good Game] we knew there was nothing out there in mainstream media that satisfied us as gamers, and so we made the show from within the community... The TV show is just part of this community and there is really no screen between us and them." News.com.au said, "Good Game thrives from online interaction with its viewers, offering free episodes and even gaming sessions with the team", citing Carr's explanation: "Our forums are incredibly active, we play games regularly with people who watch the show, and the emails they send are like, 'Hey Jungy (co-host Junglist), thanks for knifing me last night!'" After spontaneously deciding to attend the EB Games Gold Coast conference, thinking the experience would be lonely and awkward, Hex and Bajo were overwhelmed by the response; the hundreds of people in queues to go see them. It was due to fan requests that Ask Good Game – an exclusive segment to Good Game: Spawn Point for some time – was added back to the parent show. In 2013, Bajo and Hex had an AMA with their fans on Reddit.

=== Online presence ===
Got a tear in my eye. BEST TEAM EVA and BEST AUDIENCE EVA. GG & SP are utterly beloved by me. Thank you to all the brilliant people who have been part of the GG family and to the gamers of Australia, it's always been about you. Thank you. Syd. X

— Syd in the Facebook discussion related to 100,000 likes on Good Games Facebook page.

The show is heavily involved with the internet – Bajo said "we're pretty much on the internet all the time, whether it being on our phones or on our consoles, or tablets or on our PC", and Hex added "we're both heavily involved in social media". Good Game has overflow extending to the show's website, a Facebook account, a Twitter account, a YouTube account, forums and more. The show is active on Facebook, Twitter and Instagram, posting weekly about recent episodes or behind the scenes content. Bajo, Hex and Goose also have their own social media accounts, which are frequently updated with both show-related and personal content.

In 2011, the show achieved a five city metro average audience of 99,000, and an increase of 11% viewership over its 2010 results. In 2011, the show recorded 572,000 views via ABC iview. Its website is available over several platforms, including web-browser, and even direct via the Xbox 360 dashboard. The series recorded over 3 million vodcast downloads, the most by any ABC TV program. The series had around 3.4 million viewings of streamed "extra" video content.

=== Polls and forums ===
The Good Game website has polls every week that seek viewer's opinions on a variety of issues including current events in the gaming world, or the latest reviewed game. The Good Game forum is where a lot of the discussion occurs between the show and the viewers. It is located in a tab on the main page. The forums "are...used by [both] fans and the production team". Girl.com.au said the Good Game forums are the most active of all communication streams between the production team and fans, "with well over a million individual posts". As of 22 March 2010 The Good Game forum is the largest ABC television forum with other 14,000 contributors, 300 topics and 430,000 messages. Unregistered users' posts are pre-moderated before they are published to the Good Game forum, while registered users may post instantly, therefore causing some time delay between post and upload for unregistered users. In 2014, Good Game ran a poll asking its viewers for their votes of the 100 best games, which were listed in a special hour-long episode a few weeks later.

=== Good Game "Game" ===
Good Game "Game" was a competition for series 4 where viewers were asked to give suggestions and ideas for a crowdsourced playable game prototype, to be officially released on 17 November 2008. The initiative was announced on 21 December 2007 If "there [was] much popularity within the community" it was a possibility for "the game [to be taken] further and produce[d] for PC, XBLA and PSN". The Good Game website explains that "In an Australian first, Good Game and the Australian Film Commission, invited the Good Game audience to bring their creative ideas together to help build their own playable online game. As well as giving the audience a chance to develop a 'crowd sourced' game of their choice, the most innovative contributors have been rewarded with prizes, including two mentorships with Infinite Interactive", developer of Puzzle Quest. The Australian Film Commission and ABC TV announced the initiative on 21 December 2007, and applications closed on 15 February 2008. Lori Flekser, director of film development at the AFC said, "We are all very excited about Good Game as it provides a terrific opportunity within a reasonable budget for a games developer to have this exposure through a television program and to create a game which they can exploit in the future". The competition was set up in 3 phases. Janet Carr said "We're going to have input at every single stage so by the end of it, hopefully, anyone who's really interested in being part of it will feel like they have been." In Phase 1, Good Game asked their viewers for ideas for a "game they would want to play & build". Entrants were aged from years 10 to 54, and game ideas ranged from Outback Rescue (rescuing lost tourists) to Full Turtle Racket (about baby sea turtles), and two entries suggested a game based around then-Prime Minister John Howard. Troy's Office Wars idea was chosen from over 800 entries, after being chosen as the top choice for each judge in a panel of industry experts. The panel included Janet Carr, "as well as representatives from the AFC and the game developer". The game "involve[d] the player trying to manage a series of basic office tasks whilst fighting against the clock, their co-workers and many other hazards." Zac Duff, who worked on the project, described it as "frantic" due to the multitasking involved. The premise, according to Troy, was as follows:

The Office Wars concept: you are the average Joe or Jill, working in the average office. You want to make it to the top and will do anything to get there, no matter how sneaky, underhanded and deceitful that may be (even go as far as to actually WORK HARD if need be, but only as a last resort). Your ultimate goal is to get promoted and make it to "The Top".

He was announced as the winner of Good Game's game design competition on the 21 April 2008 episode. Due to the "quality of entries", 20 entries were deemed winners in the end, and their creators received a "Good Game T-Shirt for their outstanding efforts and unique ideas". However, Troy received a gaming console as his prize. As part of the Good Game Game competition, two internships at Infinite Interactive were offered to the entrants. The 20 winners were interviewed by the panel for one of the internships, with Zac Duff being named the final winner of the prize. He started at the company in August that year and worked on Office Wars. Phase 2 involved Good Game setting up 4 tasks, which sought viewers' "ideas on how we should start to shape the game". Tasks included things like naming the corporation and its type of business, and naming the 5 statistics and skills of the player. The top ideas were chosen by the GG team, and voted on in the Good Game forum. Six people were awarded console prizes for their efforts. Timothy Randall, one of the 6 winners, was named the winner of the 2nd internship for Infinite Interactive in this phase. Phase 3 involved coming up with the company logo design, the company's corporate website design, the title music track for the game, and the game's backstory: the history of Wagglemax company & the corporate profiles of the characters. Good Game added a series of "great exercises and tips taken from the Creativity Boot Camp session at the 2008 Game Developers Conference" in order to encourage creativity and inspiration. The entire 90-page Game Design word document is available on the show's website, as is both the game's trailer and a download link for the prototype. Blender was used for "all of the environment work", as well as some of the 3D model animations. Steve Fawkner, CEO Infinite Interactive said, "Office Wars is one of those ideas that just makes you say 'why didn't I think of that before?' It contains that wonderful mix of novelty, familiarity and inspiration that we were hoping to find in the Good Game Game project.". Overall, the game was "developed over 3 months, with much of its development filmed and screened on Good Game". After the competition ended, Good Game put a notice up on their website saying: "The Good Game "Game" competition was a great success, and we would like to thank everyone who entered for their effort and creative ideas". The notice continued by explaining that the game was still in beta version, but encourages viewers to "play adventurously and send us your comments...feedback and bug finds". Part of the purpose of setting up the competition was to "raise the profile of the Australian games industry" by "show[ing] people what kind of different jobs there are and hopefully inspir[ing] them to become part of the industry, then that would be great."

=== Roffle Cup ===
The show itself was simply fun. Conversational in tone, jovial in presentation, it felt more like a casual trivia night between friends than a serious competition, and for an audience with such variety I consider that a success. There were a few organisational hiccups – contestants talking over DARREN as he asked a question, then making him repeat it because they didn't hear it, and a charades-esque round was cut short due to some confusion – but they were forgivable for a first time effort, and somehow they added to the charm of the show. Everyone involved should be proud of what they accomplished: an immensely enjoyable afternoon of gaming trivia with an audience who shared a passion for gaming.

— AlexPants, Good Game's Roffle Cup and the Audience That Surprised Me

The Roffle Cup is a live gaming panel quiz, held for the first time in 2012. It took place on Sunday 11 November at the Sydney Opera House, and was 120 minutes long. The event had Bajo and Hex as team leaders, with Mark Serrels and Maude Garrett completing Team Bajo, and Joab Gilroy and Jimmy Rees completing Team Hex. Goose served as the roaming audience interactor, and DARREN's role was quizmaster.

=== Good Game Live ===
The Roffle Cup was replaced by Good Game Live from 2013 on, with the title encompassing all of Good Game's live shows. This has included live quiz shows in which teams play for the Roffle Cup as a trophy, and Spawn Point shows which include Ask Good Game and a quiz component.

== Tie-in media ==
=== Mobile application ===
In 2012, Good Game released an app that is the self-proclaimed "ultimate tool for staying on top of the latest game reviews and Good Game news while on the go". It has game reviews from the show, full episodes, the ability to make profiles, user reviews, sharing, and achievements. The iPhone version was released first, and the Android one was developed for a released later that year. The Android version began Beta testing in August 2012, and users could test out the beta by sending Good Game an email with a request. The average rating for the Android version is 4.7 out of 5 based on 351 user ratings.

=== Book ===
On 1 December 2009, the companion book The Good Game Gamer's Guide to Good Gaming (ISBN 978-0-7333-2560-1) was released. The premise is that due to statistics like the Australian gaming industry profiting over $1 billion and in profit and 95% of Australian youth calling themselves gamers, "the chances are that someone close to you cares a bit about videogames and also knows a bit about...Good Game". Therefore, this "guide to videogaming", designed to cater to the spectrum of gamers from "hardcore pros to excitable newbies", includes information on things like: "the best games of all time, the main genres of gaming, gaming trends, the key developers whose work you need to know about, how to get into the industry, how games evolved and where things are headed" was conceived. The book also helps readers to "understand developments, get good ideas, learn about ratings, make connections...find out what makes gamers tick...[and learn] tips on improving [their] gaming skills". Just like the show, it features descriptions of games which should be played, history about game development in Australia and other general video game related discussions. It was co-written by hosts Steven O'Donnell and Jeremy Ray and show producers Janet Carr and Maurice Branscombe, and was published by ABC Books. Girl.com.au described the book as a "fantastic guide" and "brilliantly packaged", and added it is "not only a great insight into the gaming world, but also helpful for those in the know and those just getting a taste for gaming".

== Critical reception ==
Good Game constantly receives generally positive feedback. In a "Good, Alright, Bad Or Ugly?" rating system, Change the Channel gave Good Game a score of "Alright". Invalid Channel gave the show a 7.5 out of 10.

Jasonb, when interviewing Bajo, noted that in his opinion "A lot of the success of Good Game is from your own style, sense of humour and presentation". In 2010, Change The Channel said "as is expected...game reviewers Hex and Bajo bounce about delivering sometimes funny, sometimes forced, commentary on the world of gaming" from a set that "looks rejected from CheeseTV" due to its tight budget. The site adds that despite this, "Good Game makes for a refreshing addition to the game criticism conversation". It described their chemistry as not "at a Margaret and David level yet", but put that down to the recent changeover, and said Bajo had much better chemistry with Hex than with Junglist. The site added that "they both feel like they're occasionally reading, and Bajo sometimes hams it up so much he comes across as though he's auditioning for a kids afternoon program". It said the various segments throughout the show's history from different reporters have mostly been hit and miss, adding that "Why Gamers Cheat" was better than a recent segment "which was too silly to be worth paying much attention to". It compared the show positively to video game review series Zero Punctuation, and added that excluding Charlie Brooker's Gameswipe one-off special, it is "the best television based gaming alternative out there" due to being both funny and optimistic about the state of the gaming industry.

Hope 103.2 describes the show as "it's light-hearted, easy to watch and strangely informative". Reviewer Mark Hadley said he enjoyed the "cheeky and full of quirky sideline segments, naming 'Fanboys vs. Haters' as his favourite, due to its demonstration that "one man's chalk is another man's cheese". Despite the widely varying opinions of games, he stresses "the joy of video games is their ability to test our physical, mental, even spiritual limits by taking us outside of ourselves". He has praised the inclusion of "sensitive segments on cyber bullying within the gaming community and girls in games". He argues that as Good Game Spawn Point is "particularly aimed at G and PG gamers", (meaning everyone – as all people can play G or PG games), he can watch the show with his children, allowing him the "opportunity to connect" part of the gaming conversation. Interviewer SteveMolk said, "not only are Bajo & Hex becoming great story tellers in their own right, but Janet has drawn to the show a wider crew who are all gamers and skilled producers, editors, and special-effects wizards in their own right. All this for a 'little gaming show'".

Invalid Channel said, "Bajo and Hex are hilarious to watch, they have so many funny moments. You can tell they know their shit, too, they've been around the block when it comes to games and they use terminology without it sounding super lame and out of place. At the same time, they make it easy for non-gamers, or people who wish they were gamers (ie: me) to understand. Bits and pieces feel really awkward though, and I know they put in awkward moments for comedic effect sometimes, but I find that these don't always have the comedic effect that they're probably going for, and end up going full circle just being plain awkward". It argues the "small size and down-to-earth-ness" of the show adds to its charm, by saying "a commercial version of the show would be way too polished and just wouldn't feel right". It ended its review by saying "all in all, Good Game is a good show [and] the reviews are quite good". While it thought there was room for improvement, it said "the show's got it's [sic] niche and it should stick to it".

=== Credibility ===
When asked on Good Game: Spawn Point about their credibility in reviewing games when they're "both too old to understand games from a spawnlings perspective", Bajo and Hex responded: "We may not be quite as young as some of you spawnlings [younger gamers] but all those years have been spent playing games, giving us a lot of the experience and expertise required for the kind of thorough games criticism we provide." When asked if they are pro gamers, Bajo and Hex explained that in truth they aren't, as "a pro gamer is someone who plays games professionally at the highest competitive levels in tournaments... so we don't really fit that description, and pro gamers around the world would scoff if we ever said we were "pro"." They added that their job as game critics is not to be the best of the best at any one particular game, but to "be ok at all types of games so we can review and compare them to help you decide if you want to play them." They said they review bad games along with good games as they can't know what quality the game will be until they've actually played it, and also if all the reviewed games were given highly positive reviews, they reviews would be redundant and their rating system meaningless. Also, as games are expensive, the team want to warn viewers about what games they should avoid. They have also stated they make an effort to review games on all consoles.

Steve Molks, who interviewed them, said, "Speaking with them you learn very quickly that they aren't just 'presenters' who turn up for filming and that's it; they're gamers of note in their own right and spend hours playing to review games thoroughly and log footage for the show, as well as editing and pre-recording for the show". Invalid Channel said "you can really tell that they've taken all of the footage themselves, it's not one-sided stock footage from the developing company. The hosts really play the games themselves and it shows, but you know that you're getting a real opinion from someone who played the game and know exactly how it handles and how annoying all those bugs are, not two people reading straight from some sort of rigid script." He adds that "being on a non-commercial network helps too" as if the show was on a commercial network it may be more successful, but its credibility would be lost as "once the game companies start paying sponsorship, you'd be seeing a lot of 10/10's and a whole lot of kiss-ass".

In regard to being asked if she is putting on a geeky and gaming persona for the cameras, Hex explains that it "would be so impossible to manufacture a whole persona" across all the different platforms that she uses to interact with people. Hex said the capture and logging is the most challenging part of the job, but it is also unique as if she is referencing a particular part of the game, she can show her own personal experience rather than rolling stock footage. Bajo says this is also for editorial reasons in that, "We need to defend our point by showing the footage to satisfy the ABC's charter." Bajo notes that in the show's early days, there were some intense forum flames over things like missing a detail out, or not agreeing with the general consensus among viewers. He also says that if there is a genre of games that he and Hex don't like or aren't very good at, such as sports games, they won't ignore it and will try to be as honest as possible with their reviews. Bajo says that as people invest so many hours into a game, it is justified to feel a sense of ownership over it and feel defensive if someone doesn't feel the same way. For this reason he loves "getting to the bottom of" why certain games are liked by some and disliked by others. Bajo says you can't speak with conviction if you haven't done something, especially "[played] something as involving as games". Bajo explains "[we do receive negative feedback from] the odd publisher/developer who wasn't happy with our review [but] we try to be fair, honest, and listen to all feedback we get to make sure we're not ever crossing any lines."

== Awards and achievements ==
At the sixth annual Sun Microsystems IT Journalism Awards, held on 1 April 2008, Good Game won two gold Lizzie awards, including one for the most prestigious category, Technology Title of the Year, becoming only the second non-print title to "take home the top prize". The show also won the award for Best Multimedia Coverage of 2007 after "scoring through the roof". A special mention was made that Good Game won the Gold "Lizzie" by the most votes in the awards history. Good Game was also Commended in the Best Gaming Title of 2007 category and Good Game's researcher Maurice Branscombe was also highly commended in the Best Gaming Journalist of 2007 category. Amanda Duthie, Head Arts, Entertainment and Comedy, ABC TV said "We are thrilled that Good Game has been recognised for both editorial coverage and technological innovation at the Lizzie Awards".

At the seventh annual Sun Microsystems IT Journalism Awards, Good Game won the award for Best Video Production of 2008. According to ABCYou, "the judging panel's final comments included nothing but praise for the show, including commendations that Good Game is an "excellent all-round production", and that the show has a lot of 'street cred'. One judge even went so far as to compare Good Game with the UK's most popular auto program, Top Gear, by saying 'these guys love games the way Jeremy Clarkson loves cars'". "Junglist" and "Bajo" accepted the award on the night. Maurice Branscombe was Highly Commended in the category of Best Gaming Journalist for the second year running. Jeremy Ray was highly commended in the Best Gaming Journalist category, and nominated in the Best Reviewer category.

In a review of the 2009 book The Good Game Gamer's Guide to Good Gaming, Girl.com.au mentioned that "Good Game is now the number-one downloadable show across all of ABC Television (almost one million downloads this year alone)". Interviewer SteveMolk said, "They've worked hard to gain the support of the Australian gaming community and this is reflected in the show – it's one of the strongest shows on ABC2 evenings and the show is the most downloaded/watched show via the ABC's iview service".

In 2010, Good Game picked up a "Lizzie", for "Best Video Production". Good Game was the most downloaded ABCTV show in 2009 and 2010. The show won the iTunes Rewind award for Best Video Podcast in 2011. In 2012, Good Game was Highly Commended as Best Video Program at the tenth annual Sun Microsystems IT Journalism Awards. Good Game was nominated for Australian Gaming Entertainer of the Year at the AGGN 2012 Gaming Awards.

In 2013, Good Game won Best Video Production at the MCV Awards, where Bajo and Hex hosted. In the same year, the show was also highly commended for best video program at the 2013 Lizzies.

== Spin-off shows ==
=== Good Game: Spawn Point ===
Good Game: Spawn Point is a version of Good Game aimed at spawnlings (younger gamers), though Bajo and Hex have stressed in the past that the show is for gamers of all ages. The show is hosted by Bajo, Hex, and a robot named DARREN. Part of the reason for its creation is because "some of the content in the games isn't necessarily appropriate for a younger player". MolksTVTalk1 explains that the show is one of a few on TV that doesn't dumb it down for kids, and is genuinely enjoyable content for all ages. Hex said that they made a conscious effort not to be condescending as the younger gamers see right through it and get offended by it, and that they are game-savvy anyway. For this reason, only a few minor differences needed to be made, for the format's transition to a younger audience. Bajo explained that it was Janet Carr's idea to do a kids show, and the team was like "yeah, of course we have to". The audience interactivity spreads to Good Game: Spawn Point as well. One of the segments introduced in this spin-off is Ask Good Game, where the hosts answer gaming questions by the viewers. Bajo said "we get something like 3 emails a minute from kids", and Hex said "the letters and mail we get from kids are awesome". Janet Carr said around 50% of Spawn Point's audience are female, and MolksTVTalk1 said the show has given many young female gamers a role model in Hex. Many questions were asked regarding Minecraft that the team put a special F.A.Q. related to the game on the GG: SP website. The show started in 2010.

=== Good Game: Pocket Edition ===
Good Game describes Good Game: Pocket Edition as an "add-on pack" and "our concise edition – a weekly accessory to our regular shows, Good Game and Spawn Point". The episodes are around 10 minutes long, and aim to "give busy gamers a handy round-up of all that's been good in gaming". The Pocket Edition tab of the main page explains that the show is "our chance to chat a bit more about the games we're currently playing, round up the week's reviews, and even spend a bit more time answering your gaming queries at the GG desk." It acts as an "accessory" to both parent shows, Good Game and Spawn Point, and as such often takes bits of reviews from them, but sometimes has original content as well. The show rarely has any other segments than the main game reviews (due to being about a third the length of a normal show), besides Ask Good Game and the P.E.-exclusive You Review – where Bajo and Hex read out user reviews of a reviewed game from one of the parent shows' previous episode.

All the episodes are available as a playlist on Good Game's YouTube channel. They can also be download from the main page, or streamed on iview. On 9 May 2014, it was announced that Good Game: Pocket Edition was no longer being produced, due to a schedule change on ABC2.

==== Episodes ====
Series overview
Series	Episodes	Originally aired	
Series	Episodes	Series premiere	Series finale
1	43	16 February 2013	7 December 2013
2	12	22 February 2014	11 May 2014

===== Series 1 (2013) =====
Date	№	Reviews
16 February	1	Ni no Kuni: Wrath of the White Witch, DmC: Devil May Cry, Aliens: Colonial Marines, Dead Space 3
23 February	2	Metal Gear Rising: Revengeance, Antichamber, No Time To Explain
2 March	3	Crysis 3, Euro Truck Simulator 2, Persona 4 Golden, Proteus
9 March	4	Real Racing 3, Temple Run 2, Hackycat, Naruto Shippuden: Ultimate Ninja Storm 3, Tomb Raider
16 March	5	Skulls of the Shogun, Serious Sam Double D XXL, Sly Cooper: Thieves in Time, Path of Exile (beta)
23 March	6	God of War: Ascension, Runner2, SimCity
30 March	7	StarCraft II: Heart of the Swarm, Sonic Dash, Gears of War: Judgment, BioShock Infinite
6 April	8	Need for Speed: Most Wanted U, Neverwinter (beta), Luigi's Mansion 2
13 April	9	The Walking Dead: Survival Instinct, Year Walk, Lego City Undercover, Monster Hunter 3 Ultimate
20 April	10	Bientôt l'été, Ridiculous Fishing: A Tale of Redemption, Penumbear, Incredipede, Army of Two: The Devil's Cartel
27 April	11	Defiance, BattleBlock Theater, Age of Empires II: HD Edition, Injustice: Gods Among Us
4 May	12	Dead Island Riptide, Guacamelee!, ShootMania Storm, Guild Wars 2: Super Adventure Box, Star Trek
11 May	13	Mortal Kombat, Slender: The Arrival, Motocross Madness, Far Cry 3: Blood Dragon
18 May	14	Monaco: What's Yours Is Mine, Robot Unicorn Attack 2, StarDrive, Metro: Last Light
25 May	15	Zeno Clash II, Evoland, Badland, Deadly Premonition: The Director's Cut
1 June	16	Mario and Donkey Kong: Minis on the Move, Don't Starve, Dust 514, Grid 2
8 June	17	Call of Juarez: Gunslinger, Paper Titans, Pokémon Mystery Dungeon: Gates to Infinity, Sanctum 2, Remember Me
15 June	18	Fuse, Reus, Ratchet and Clank: QForce, The Last of Us
22 June	19	Star Wars: Knights of the Old Republic (iOS), Game Dev Tycoon, Fire Emblem Awakening
29 June	20	E3 2013 Special (no reviews)
6 July	21	Deadpool, Donkey Kong Country Returns 3D, Kingdom Rush Frontiers, Company of Heroes 2, The Swapper
13 July	22	Ouya, TowerFall, Animal Crossing: New Leaf, Wonderbook: Diggs Nightcrawler, Neverwinter
20 July	23	Unepic, Magrunner: Dark Pulse, Game & Wario, Wargame: AirLand Battle
27 July	24	New Super Luigi U, The Walking Dead: 400 Days (DLC), Dota 2
3 August	25	Oculus Rift (development kit), Plants vs. Zombies 2: It's About Time, War Thunder (beta)
10 August	26	Halo: Spartan Assault, Cube World (alpha), Towncraft, State of Decay, Shadowrun Returns
17 August	27	Payday 2 (beta), Rogue Legacy, Pikmin 3
24 August	28	Disney Infinity, Rise of the Triad, Cloudberry Kingdom, InFlux, Brothers: A Tale of Two Sons
31 August	29	Saints Row IV, The Bureau: XCOM Declassified, Take on Mars, Unmechanical, Splinter Cell: Blacklist
7 September	30	Diablo III (console version), Gone Home, Flashback, Rayman Legends, Lost Planet 3
14 September	31	Killer Is Dead, Killzone: Mercenary, TMNT: Out of the Shadows, Pirates! Showdown, Total War: Rome II
21 September	32	Papers, Please, Kingdom Hearts HD 1.5 Remix, The Wonderful 101, Final Fantasy XIV: A Realm Reborn
28 September	33	Outlast, Grand Theft Auto V
5 October	34	FIFA 14, Pro Evolution Soccer 2014, Infinity Blade III, ARMA III
12 October	35	Tokyo Game Show Special (no reviews)
19 October	36	NBA 2K14, Rain, Beyond: Two Souls
26 October	37	Grand Theft Auto Online, Dragon's Crown, Skylanders: Swap Force, Amnesia: A Machine for Pigs
2 November	38	The Wolf Among Us, Ep.1, Shelter, Pokémon X and Y, Monster Meltdown, Batman: Arkham Origins
9 November	39	Warface, Sonic Lost World, Nowhere Boys: The 5th Boy, Assassin's Creed IV: Black Flag
16 November	40	Shadow Warrior, Lego Marvel Super Heroes, Wii U Party, Battlefield 4
23 November	41	Just Dance 2014, Ratchet & Clank: Nexus, Lilly Looking Through, Desktop Dungeons, CoD: Ghosts
30 November	42	Xbox One, Ryse: Son of Rome, Dead Rising 3, Super Mario 3D World, PlayStation 4, Killzone: Shadow Fall
7 December	43	Awards Special (no reviews)

===== Series 2 (2014) =====
Date	№	Reviews
22 February	1	Risk of Rain, Peggle 2, Nidhogg, Octodad, Broken Age: Act 1
1 March	2	Dragon Ball Z: Battle of Z, Strike Vector, Thief
8 March	3	AC4: Freedom Cry (DLC), TLoU: Left Behind (DLC), World of Tanks, Donkey Kong Country: Tropical Freeze, Castlevania: Lords of Shadow 2
15 March	4	Plants vs. Zombies: Garden Warfare, TxK, Banished, Dark Souls II, South Park: The Stick of Truth
22 March	5	Strider, Drox Operative, Starbound, Lightning Returns: FFXIII
30 March	6	Metal Gear Solid V: Ground Zeroes, Rambo: The Video Game, The Powerpuff Girls: Defenders of Townsville, Smash Hit, Titanfall
6 April	7	Hearthstone: Heroes of Warcraft, Infested Planet, Angry Birds Epic, Yoshi's New Island, Infamous Second Son
13 April	8	Luftrausers, NaissanceE, Constant C, The Lego Movie Videogame, Diablo III: Reaper of Souls
20 April	9	BioShock Infinite: Burial at Sea (DLC), Star Wars: Assault Team, Cloudbuilt, The Elder Scrolls Online
27 April	10	Goat Simulator, Escape Goat 2, Don Bradman Cricket 14, Kinect Sports Rivals, Age of Wonders III
4 May	11	Dead Nation: Apocalypse Edition, Clash of Clans, Trials Fusion, The Walking Dead: Season Two, Ep. 1–2
11 May (Note: Due to a change in the ABC2 schedule, Good Game: Pocket Edition was cancelled, making the episode that aired on 4 May 2014 the final episode. The episode originally due to air on 11 May 2014 was released on the same day on YouTube.)	12	War of the Vikings, Strike Suit Zero: Director's Cut, LEGO: The Hobbit, Child of Light

=== Good Game Pocket ===
Good Game Pocket is a daily online show hosted by Nich "NichBoy" Richardson. Announced on 2 February 2015, and released on 16 February 2015, Pocket focused on News and a first look at games, hosted by Michael "Hingers" Hing,

In the episode published on 27 April 2015, it was announced that NichBoy would be taking over the role of host, as he had been filling in for Hingers, and Hingers would be hosting a new show titled "Good Game Well Played" which would focus on eSports and the eSport community.

In 2015, Good Game Pocket's schedule released two videos every weekday on ABC iView and YouTube, featuring News at approximately 12:30pm Sydney Time, and at approximately 3:45pm Sydney Time, "Pocket Prime", Nich hosts a First Play, an Interview or an "Ask Pocket", where he answers questions from the community on the topic of video games or Pocket itself. There's also a Livestream on the Good Game channel on Wednesdays at 3:00pm Sydney Time.

On 5 November, it was officially announced by Good Game's Twitter that Pocket has been recommissioned for another year.

On 4 January 2016, Good Game Pocket began their second year with a new format for their videos and schedule. Instead of their established "News" and "Prime" videos, they've adopted a "Vodcast" format for the news, where NichBoy discusses news headlines within the industry with guests, as well as a Let's Play format for gameplay. Originally, NichBoy would play an hour of uninterrupted gameplay with a discussion on the game at the end of the video, however after criticism for its "non-pocket like" formatting, they reduced it to 10–20 minutes per video, and opted to do Live Streams every Tuesday and Thursday at 3:00PM Sydney Time. The News is published at 5:00PM Sydney Time, while Prime is usually released sometime after.

=== Good Game Well Played ===
Good Game Well Played is a weekly online show hosted by Angharad "Rad" Yeo, formerly hosted by Michael "Hingers" Hing. The show releases every Wednesday on ABC iview and YouTube, featuring eSports news and discussion.

=== Good Game: Grandstand ===
Good Game: Grandstand was a monthly podcast hosted by Bajo, based around sport-related video gaming such as the title Grand Slam Tennis 2, and it featured interviews with game-featured sports figures such as Pat Cash. It was broadcast on Grandstand Digital in Brisbane, Sydney, Canberra, Melbourne, Adelaide, and Perth, and can be accessed at the Grandstand and Good Game websites. Two episodes were aired: on 17 February and 30 March 2012. Bajo was joined by games journalist Joab Gilroy in both shows.
