= Stephanie Bendixsen =

Australian television presenter (born 1987)

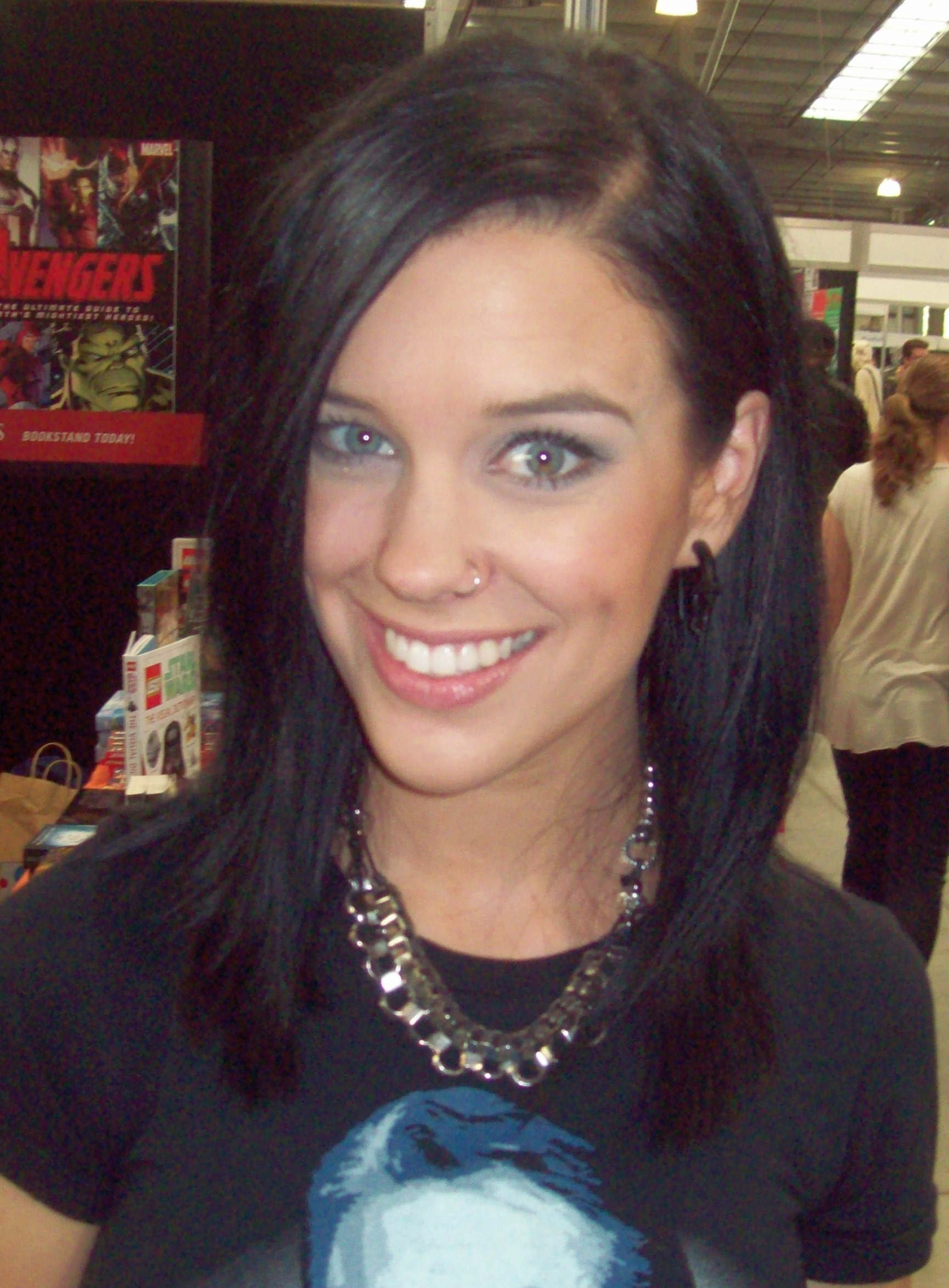
- Bendixsen at the Melbourne Supanova Pop Culture Expo in 2012
- Born: Stephanie Claire Bendixsen; 31 March 1985 (age 41); Sydney, New South Wales, Australia
- Other name: Hex
- Occupations: Television presenter, actress, author
- Years active: 1987–present
- Known for: Good Game
- Spouse: Peter Burns (m. 2019)
- Website: stephaniebendixsen.com

Stephanie Claire Bendixsen (born 31 March 1985) is an Australian video game critic, author, and is best known as one of the former presenters of the video game television programs Good Game and Good Game: Spawn Point, where she went by the gamertag "Hex", and screenPLAY.

== Early life ==
Bendixsen was born in Sydney, New South Wales, to an Argentinian father Axel Bendixsen and a Dutch mother Winifred Margaretha Klinkhamer. When she was two years old, she moved with her family to Auckland, New Zealand, where she lived until the age of nine when she moved back to Australia. When she was a child, she wanted to be an equestrian due to her fascination with horses.

In adolescence, her parents refused to let her play any form of video games, and she would sneak out of home to her friends' places to play games with them. When she was fifteen years old, Bendixsen stumbled upon a Multi-user dungeon video game titled Lensmoor, and she became addicted to it. Bendixsen influenced her peers to play the game, causing her to regularly play the game deep into the night and consequently passing out from exhaustion during class. This addiction ended when her teacher notified her parents, and she was sent to therapy.

Bendixsen became interested in arts, as they provided her with some degree of escapism. She studied acting at Western Sydney University with the goal to obtain a basic arts degree. Bendixsen did not finish her studies and worked full-time in a call centre.

== Career ==
=== Good Game ===
In 2009, the ABC ran a nationwide search for television presenters to host a new kids channel, ABC3, and Bendixsen auditioned for one of the positions. While shooting her audition video, she discovered that the ABC2 video game review show Good Game was looking for a presenter. Bendixsen was approached by the ABC for the Good Game presenter role after auditioning for the role of a judge on ABC 3's talent search Me on 3. Being a long-time fan of the show herself, she applied for—and won—the role, replacing former host Jeremy Ray. Bendixsen also became a co-host for the show's spin-off Good Game: Spawn Point, on ABC3 aimed at younger audiences.

On 26 October 2009, she made her debut on Good Game and Good Game: Spawn Point on 20 February 2010 alongside host Steven "Bajo" O'Donnell. Bendixsen replaced the former Good Game co-host Jeremy "Junglist" Ray—even though it was originally planned that she would join the two hosts instead of replacing one of them. Due to this incident, Bendixsen endured cyberbullying and doxing attempts from the viewers of Good Game, who were infuriated by Ray's forced departure from the show.

In January 2017, Bendixsen announced her departure from the show, resulting in its cancellation.

=== screenPLAY ===
In June 2017, Bendixsen joined a new video game television program called screenPLAY on Channel Seven. The show launched online on 19 June. On 30 April 2018, screenPLAY was cancelled.

=== Back Pocket ===
In 2020, Bendixsen helped to launch an online gaming show called Back Pocket, where she and her colleagues present video game–related news and gameplays. The show is funded by its audience using the membership platform Patreon.

=== Other ===
Bendixsen wrote a monthly gaming column for Dolly magazine, and acted in an online mini-series called People You May Know.

In 2016, Bendixsen created and presented her own program called How To Be A Fan With Hex. For the show, she also directed a fan film called Dangerous Night, which pays homage to the 1982 film Blade Runner.

She has co-written four children's books with her former Good Game co-host Steven "Bajo" O'Donnell. Dig World and Dragon Land were published in 2016, Speed Zone was published in 2017, and Space Fortress was published in 2018.

In September 2022, Bendixsen co-hosted high-school television series Ultimate Classroom alongside Eddie Woo, an educational STEM competition sponsored by the Australian Defence Force.

== Personal life ==
Bendixsen's Gamertag "Hex" came from her love of spellcasters in role-playing games, and their common attribute in a spell called "Hex", whereby an enemy would be afflicted by a curse which usually would cause damage or immobilise its current state. Hex now plays more stealth-based characters, such as a Rogue or Thief, but chooses to keep the name as a nickname.

In 2012, Bendixsen started a relationship with Good Game's former production coordinator Peter "Pierreth" Burns. The two became engaged in February 2019, and they married on 17 August 2019.

== Credits ==
=== Film ===
Year	Film	Role	Notes
2009	Braille	Stephanie	Independent film
2016	Dangerous Night	-	Director

=== Television ===
Year	Title	Role	Notes
2009–2016	Good Game	Herself	Co-host
2010–2016	Good Game: Spawn Point	Herself	Co-host
2011	The Bazura Project	Space Cheerleader Queen	-
2013–2014	Good Game: Pocket Edition	Herself	Co-host
2014–2015	My Great Big Adventure	Herself	Co-host
2017–2018	screenPLAY	Herself	Co-host
2019	Thrones 360	Herself	Co-host
2019	Bluey	Corgi/Vet	Episode: Copycat (Voice role)
2019	Only in Oz	Herself	Co-host
2022	Ultimate Classroom	Herself	Co-host
2026	Ultimate Classroom	Herself	Co-host

=== Web series ===
Year	Title	Role	Notes
2012	People You May Know	Dylan	-
2016	How To Be A Fan With Hex	Herself	Host
2020–present	Back Pocket	Herself	Host

=== Bibliography ===
Year	Title
2016	Dig World
2016	Dragon Land
2017	Speed Zone
2018	Space Fortress
