= Slaughtered =

- Teaser poster
- Directed by: Kate Glover
- Written by: Kate Glover
- Produced by: Kate Glover; Ben Lucas; Sue Brown
- Starring: Steven O’Donnell; James Kerley
- Cinematography: Nate Martin : D.O.P Matt Clegg : Camera Operator
- Distributed by: Red Sparrow Productions
- Release date: 30 October 2009
- Country: Australia
- Language: English

Slaughtered (working title Schooner of Blood) is an Australian slasher film directed by Kate Glover, and produced by Sue Brown. The film stars Steven O’Donnell and James Kerley.

== Premise ==
The story tells of a bloody masked killer who stalks victims in an isolated country pub.

== Cast ==
- Chloe Boreham
- Cassandra Swaby
- Michael Lewis
- Chris Tomkinson
- Steven O’Donnell
- James Kerley
- Erica Baron as Kirsty

== Production ==
The shooting began in February 2007 and was the directorial debut for Kate Glover. Makeup effects were created by FX make-up artist Aline Joyce.

== Release ==
Slaughtered was featured at the United Kingdom festival Film4 Fright and in 2009 at Grimmfest.
