= How to Be a Fan With Hex =

Australian web series

- Official title card
- Created by: Stephanie Bendixsen
- Directed by: Ben Shackleford
- Presented by: Stephanie Bendixsen
- Country of origin: Australia
- Original language: English
- No. of seasons: 1
- No. of episodes: 8

Production
- Running time: 10–12 minutes

Original release
- Network: ABC iview
- Release: September 5, 2016

How To Be A Fan With Hex is an Australian observational documentary web series created and presented by Stephanie Bendixsen. The show originally aired on ABC iview on September 5, 2016. This web series' goal is to explore fandoms of different pop culture branches, and to figure out exactly what drives individuals to participate in these groups, through Bendixsen's interviews and engagement in the activities.

== Episodes ==
No.	Title	Directed by	Original release date
1	"Cosplay"	Ben Shackleford	September 5, 2016
Bendixsen explores the fandom of cosplay by asking different cosplayers what makes them want to contribute to cosplay. Furthermore, she participates in a cosplay competition by dressing up in a self-made costume as a character called Ciri from the 2015 video game The Witcher 3: Wild Hunt.
2	"LARPing"	Ben Shackleford	September 5, 2016
This episode's subject is LARP and what makes people want to be an active member of it. Bendixsen interviews a LARP member and then participates in the activity herself.
3	"Collecting"	Ben Shackleford	September 5, 2016
Bendixsen explores collecting and what makes people want to spend a lot of money for collecting different sorts of things. Stephanie interviews a VHS tape collector, and then goes on a mission to track down a VHS tape of Beauty and the Beast in its original casing.
4	"Fan Film"	Ben Shackleford	September 5, 2016
In this episode, Bendixsen explores fan films. Furthermore, she directs her own fan film called Dangerous Night, which pays homage to the 1982 film Blade Runner, and screens the film to an audience full of film school graduates.
5	"Arts and Crafts"	Ben Shackleford	September 5, 2016
Bendixsen explores the arts and crafts by visiting a market. Also, she makes her own T-shirts with viking runes, a viking helmet, and a sword portrayed on them, and proceeds to sell them in a market.
6	"Sport"	Ben Shackleford	September 5, 2016
In this episode, Bendixsen explores the fandom of sports. She interviews a player of roller derby and a member of their cheerleader team. Furthermore, she proceeds to join the cheerleader team.
7	"Tribute Band"	Ben Shackleford	September 5, 2016
Bendixsen explores tribute bands and interviews a tribute band to ABBA called ABBA's Back . Furthermore, together with a band called Boner Contention, they form their own tribute band to Killing Heidi called Heidi's Revenge, and Bendixsen proceeds to sing the song Weir on stage in front of an audience. Ella Hooper makes a surprise appearance to offer Stephanie singing advice.
8	"Dangerous Night"	Stephanie Bendixsen	September 5, 2016
This episode contains the fan film Dangerous Night, produced during episode 4.
