= Steven O'Donnell (Australian actor) =

Australian television presenter and actor

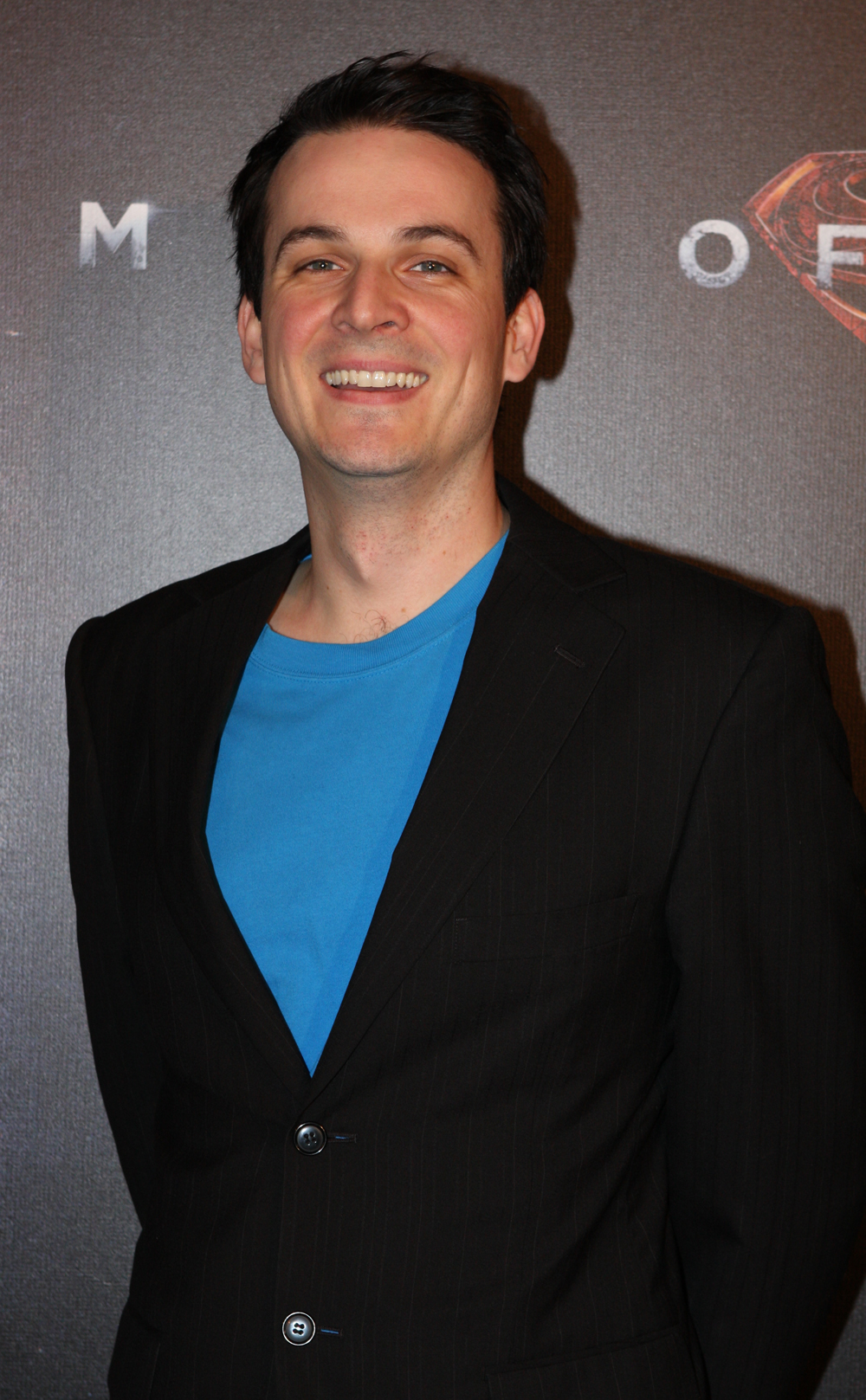
- O'Donnell in 2013
- Born: Steven O'Donnell; 5 December 1980 (age 45); New Zealand
- Other names: Bajopants, BajoStream, Bajo, BoBo
- Occupation: Television presenter
- Known for: Good Game
- Height: 1.83 m (6 ft 0 in)

Twitch information
- Channel: Bajo
- Years active: 2017–present
- Followers: 103,600 followers
- Website: https://stevenodonnell.com

Steven O'Donnell III (born 5 December 1980), better known by his gamer tag and often stage name "Bajo", is a New Zealand-Australian television presenter, actor, and author. He is best known as one of the presenters of the ABC video game programme Good Game from 2007 until its cancellation in 2016; he co-hosted Good Game: Spawn Point until November 2017, and currently streams on Twitch. O'Donnell was born in New Zealand and grew up on the outskirts of Toowoomba.

== Career ==
=== Independent film ===
O'Donnell completed his first lead role in an independent feature called Scratched (DigiSPAA film festival 2005) at the age of 20. He has since appeared in over 40 short films. After moving to Sydney in 2003, O'Donnell was cast in lead roles for the independent films Wango and Malloy and Suburban Boys.

In 2003, O'Donnell played a minor role as a lifeguard in the film Swimming Upstream. In 2005, O'Donnell worked on the feature Almost with Salvatore Coco, Ada Nicodemou and Tony Barry. In 2006, O'Donnell worked on the feature Schooner of Blood.

=== Television ===
O'Donnell hosted a live interactive quiz show on the Seven Network called Midnight Zoo in 2006.

O'Donnell joined the ABC show Good Game in 2007, co-hosting alongside Jeremy "Junglist" Ray until 2009, and Stephanie "Hex" Bendixsen from 2009 to the show's cancellation in 2016. He also co-hosted the show Good Game: Spawn Point, alongside Gus "Goose" Ronald and Angharad "Rad" Yeo; which he hosted alongside Bendixsen until her departure in 2016. For these shows, he goes by the alias "Bajo". O'Donnell resigned from the ABC in October 2017, and departed Spawn Point in December.

In 2017, O'Donnell created and appeared in a Sci-Fi children's television show called Trip For Biscuits.

=== Other ===
In 2016, O'Donnell co-wrote two children's books with Bendixsen called Dig World and Dragon Land. He began part-time streaming of video games on Twitch in March 2017, and became full-time following his resignation from the ABC in December 2017.

== Credits ==
=== Film ===
Year	Film	Role	Notes
2003	Undead	Featured zombie	
2003	Swimming Upstream	Lifeguard	
2004	Suburban Boys	Bob	Independent film
2005	Scratched	Donald	Independent film
2006	Wango and Malloy	Angus	Independent film
2007	Almost an iota of supreme genius covalent theory	William	Independent film
2007	Untitled/The Trees	Boyd / Narrator	Short film
2007	The Catalpa Rescue	John Boyle O'Reilly	uncredited
2009	Slaughtered	Jack	

=== Television ===
Year	Title	Role	Notes
2005	headLand	Student D	Series 1, Episode 23
2006	Midnight Zoo	Himself	Presenter
2006	Stepfather of the Bride	Andre	Television movie
2007–16	Good Game	Himself	Presenter, Producer
2010	Review with Myles Barlow	Himself	Series 2, Episode 2
2010–17	Good Game: Spawn Point	Himself	Presenter
2011	Bit Com and the Oblivion Ray	Himself	Aired on ABC3
2011	Cricket Smackdown	Himself	Aired on ABC3
2012	My Great Big Adventure	Himself	Episode 3
2012	Tennis Smackdown	Himself	Aired on ABC3
2012	Dance music clip	Lead	
2013	ABC3 Beach Soccer Smackdown	Himself	Aired on ABC3
2013	#7DaysLater	Ghost Soldier	Episode 6
2013–14	Good Game: Pocket Edition	Himself	Presenter
2014	ABC3 Smackdown Games	Himself	Aired on ABC3
2017	Trip For Biscuits	Co-creator, Lead	
2017-	Whovians	Himself	Presenter
2017	ABC’s New Year’s Eve special	Unaccredited, Enthusiastic Jazz Dancer	Aired on 31 December 2017

=== Bibliography ===
Year	Title
2016	Dig World
2016	Dragon Land
