= Midnight Zoo =

- Midnight Zoo logo
- Created by: Jack Dita
- Starring: Angie Richards; Charlotte Connell; Steven O'Donnell
- Country of origin: Australia

Production
- Running time: 90 minutes
- Production companies: SLR Productions; Opera Telecom; Telecoms TV

Original release
- Network: Seven Network
- Release: 31 July – 21 October 2006

Midnight Zoo was an Australian late-night interactive game show broadcast in parts of Australia on the Seven Network. Midnight Zoo debuted on 31 July 2006 and was broadcast from Sydney. It was shown live throughout Victoria and in the capital cities of Sydney and Brisbane, and ran from 12:30 am to 2:00 am Weekday mornings. The final airing of the show was on 21 October 2006. The show was hosted by Steven O'Donnell (in his first TV appearance,) Angie Richards, and Charlotte Connell.

== Etymology ==
The somewhat unusual name of the show stems from the name of the show's creator, Jack Dita aka 'The Zoo Keeper'. The presence of 'Midnight' in the name also hints at the show's late timeslot.

== Cast ==
Midnight Zoo was hosted by:

- Angie Richards – Host, Hollywood Set
- Charlotte Connell – Host, Bikini Beach Cabana Set
- Steven O'Donnell – Host, Cash Corner Set

== Format ==
Midnight Zoo was similar in concept to Network Ten's 'Up Late Game Show', hosted by former Big Brother housemate, Simon Deering aka Hotdogs.

The 90 minute runtime of Midnight Zoo was split into three 30 minute slots. Each slot was allocated to one host/location pair. The puzzles were mostly brain teasers and questions relating to popular culture and are regarded as relatively simple (for example, 'Name a movie starting with B'). Money is awarded via the gameboard, which dictates the amount of money won for a particular answer. A puzzle featured in a previous slot was carried over to the next slot, suggesting that one puzzle can sometimes occupy the entire 90 minute runtime.

To maintain interest in the show over the course of its duration, there were several segments featured during each slot. These were mostly to encourage callers during slow periods, which in turn encourages human interaction with the show. These include:

- Cash Grab – A 5-minute period where all money on the game board is doubled.
- Double Money – If successful, the next 2 callers will be awarded double their winnings.
- Call Rush – A "short amount of time" where callers are further encouraged to call by on-screen graphics.

All segments came with the added incentive of being featured on live television as a caller. At the same time, a puzzle's jackpot amount steadily increased throughout the show.

As an added bonus, all successful callers were offered a chance at the Bonus Board. The Bonus Board featured 12 numbers, of which the contestant much choose 3. If the contestant chose all three correctly, their winnings were increased by a jackpot amount which varies from $2500–$12000

== Criticism and problems ==
On 11 August 2006, satirical comedy series The Chaser's War on Everything featured a segment on the influx of late night phone-in quiz shows. The segment mocked the standard of all late night quiz programs and their questions. For Midnight Zoo, particular reference was made to the female hosts wearing bikinis.

One Australian TV critic has even classed Midnight Zoo as the worst of the genre based on the use of bikinis.

Channel Seven's morning program Sunrise showed a clip one morning of the show the night before where a picture of Sunrise host David Koch was used in a "name that face" type game. The Sunrise team criticised Midnight Zoo for spelling his name wrong and the show in general.

== Probability ==
The only probability present on Midnight Zoo that can be computed is the chance of success on the Bonus Board. This is equal to $12C3$ or 1 in 220.

The relative ease of the questions featured on Midnight Zoo suggest easy winnings for contestants. However, one must consider two important factors present in the game that restrict successful callers. Firstly, one must consider the chance of actually being chosen as a contestant. Secondly, one must consider the number of possible answers for the questions with respect to the number of available answers on the game board.

== Pricing and procedure ==
Midnight Zoo contestants are charged at a premium rate of 55c per call or text. The method of player selection was handled by registering interest via SMS or landline. When selected, players would receive a call from Midnight Zoo. Problems arising from this method include Midnight Zoo's use of an unknown number, eliminating a number of mobile users who ignore such calls.
