= Wireplay =

Defunct online multiplayer gaming network

- Original author: BT Group
- Developer: BT Group
- Release: June 1996
- Available in: English
- Type: Game server browser
- License: Proprietary
- Website: www.wireplay.co.uk (1996-2000), www.gameplay.com/wireplay (2000-2001)

Wireplay was an online multiplayer gaming network available as a dial-up service that allowed players to match up and play PC games with each other remotely. Compatible games had Wireplay capability built into the game itself, with the online service being launched from the game's menu. The service was created by BT Group and was released to the public in the UK in June 1996. 18 months later, BT licensed the technology to telephone companies in Australia and the US. At its peak, there were more than 100,000 registered users and 50,000 active monthly users in the UK. It was sold to Gameplay plc. for £5.5 million in 2000, but following the sale, the service began to make losses and in August 2001 it was reduced to a shell company and was looking to sell off Wireplay. Arena Technik then bought the service on 31 August 2001. The service endured for a time but was finally shut down in 2014.

== Features ==
Wireplay was built in to various PC games to allow players to engage in multiplayer online play via a closed dial-up network/service. A lag of 105 milliseconds was achieved assuming players met the minimum requirements of a BT landline, a PC with an Intel Pentium 486 processor and a 9600bit/s modem.

A registration process allowed for players to choose a nickname, password etc. which would then grant them access to the "notice board". The notice board was essentially a manual matchmaking hub where players could post or accept "game offers". These offers would include information such as the game's name, the selected difficulty, the time they would to play, and even specific people they would like to play against. For any game offers that were over-subscribed, the person that created the offer could select which users would join the game. Before a game began, there was the opportunity for players to chat with each other in a lobby.

Leagues, ladders and knockout tournaments were all possible within Wireplay to allow for a more competitive, rather than casual experience.

Clubs could be created for up to 30 players and could be restricted by passwords. There was also a news section containing editorials and advertisements.

== Service evolution ==
Version 1 of Wireplay could support 500 concurrent players and 50,000 registered players.

Version 2 initially increased support for up to 1,000 concurrent players, later rising to 3,000.

Version 3 was released after Wireplay was acquired by Gameplay plc. and added numerous improvements such as allowing games such as Half-Life to have matches separated by which mods were active, improvements for Peer 2 Peer and server based games, and a new GUI.

== History ==
BT publicly announced Wireplay at the Live 95 Consumer Electronics at Earl's Court in London in September 1995 where visitors were able to test out a prototype of the service. The prototype featured the games virtual pool and Descent and allowed players to run through the set-up and play with other players via a phone line and server located in York.

In January 1996, BT opened up Wireplay to beta testing by the public. The pilot consisted of 1,500 players including 150 players that were able to sign up as part of a competition run by Edge (magazine). The 1500 players were expected to use a dedicated BT hotline to update BT on their experiences with the service.

In June 1996, it was officially released to the general public. This release date was lined up with the UEFA Euro 1996 tournament which was being held in England. Due to the timing, Euro 96 was among the first Wireplay compatible games released.

18 months later, the service was also launched in the US and Australia, with BT licensing the technology to telephony companies in those countries.

In 1997, Wireplay-ready Internet cafés were opened inside a number of Blockbuster Video stores across the UK to enable those without access to the service from home to be able to play.

In addition to home/personal gaming, the service also ventured into the world of competitive gaming in 1998 when they hosted Quakedelica, a Quake II tournament in London.

On 17 December 1998, Oscar Clark, the vision lead for Wireplay, hired Garry Kasparov to promote a new chess service they'd released by playing four tables at once in an event known as "BT Wireplay Challenge". Chess along with backgammon and bridge were introduced to Wireplay as part of BT's "Play Games Now" service. The games' official governing bodies got on board with the new opportunities of Wireplay and allowed official tournament play to be carried out online.

In 1999, there were 50,000 active users a month and over 1,000 users connecting and playing simultaneously.

BT sold Wireplay to Gameplay plc. in 1999–2000 for £5.5 million. However, in June 2001, Gameplay plc. was facing financial difficulties and so proceeded to sell off assets. As part of this, they made the 5 lead server administrators redundant, however those staff continued to support the service unpaid. In August 2001, the staff noted that Wireplay was about to lose its connection to the internet and so they were to move on to other work.

On 31 August 2001, Gameplay plc. sold Wireplay to Arena Technik Limited for £132,500, mentioning that the service had generated losses from the date acquired, and also stated that "As at 31st July 2001, the company's year end, the net book value of the Wireplay assets was nil."

Finally, in 2014, Wireplay shut down altogether.

== Compatible games ==
By June 1998, there were 68 compatible games including Doom, Age of Empires, Microsoft Flight Simulator 98 and Warcraft II.

By 1999 this number had increased to over 100. As of August 2000, this number had increased further to 125 with the addition of games such as Colin McRae Rally and Half-Life.

With the release of the Wireplay v3 client, the number of compatible games dropped to 100 as of June 2001.
