= Hackycat =

2013 video game

- Designer: Ken Wong
- Platforms: Android, iOS
- Release: February 14, 2013 (iOS); 2020 (Android)
- Genres: Sports, casual
- Mode: Single-player

Hackycat is a 2013 casual sports video game developed by Ken Wong and released for iOS and Android mobile devices. The player takes the role of an athlete using cats as hacky sacks, keeping the cats aloft with kicks and collecting cheeseburgers (stylized as Cheezburgers). The game was initially released for iOS, with the Android version released in 2020.

== Gameplay ==
The player must kick cats to prevent them hitting the ground, and may collect cheeseburgers by hitting them with a cat

The player takes the role of one of three athletes, two of which are immediately available; Toby (who gains super faster), Corrine (has a larger super target), or Ramirez, a werewolf with faster kicks which must be unlocked. The player must use a cat as a hacky sack, keeping it in the air, earning points and cheeseburgers in the process. Points are earned by tapping the cat to kick it and keeping it aloft, with extra points awarded for combos or style. Cheeseburgers occasionally appear on-screen and are earned by kicking cats over them to collect them, and are used to unlock rewards. Cheeseburgers can be used to unlock cosmetics such as cats with alternate appearances, as well as permanent powerups. New cats arrive from the top of the screen periodically as the game progresses, increasing difficulty. If a cat hits the ground, or the player taps on an explosive bird, the game ends. By earning points, the player builds 'superkick' charge, and a target appears in the center of the screen upon the supercharge bar being filled. By hitting the target when cats are in the middle, they are kicked offscreen and are cleared from the game.

== Development ==
Hackycat was created by Adelaide-based developer Ken Wong over the course of a year starting in 2012, with Wong's pitch for the game being "Hackycat. It's like hackysack but with cats." The game was released on February 14, 2013. Wong received some negative responses to the games' core concept of kicking cats, he stated in an interview that he anticipated this, and that "It's interesting because in film and music and literature, we're accustomed to confronting, absurdist and exploratory work. In the context of Road Runner, Happy Tree Friends and South Park, I don't think Hackycat is so shocking." Wong designed the game to look "very simple and very naive", and was inspired by the "dorky aesthetic" of films such as Napoleon Dynamite and Nacho Libre.

Wong designed the game with simple gameplay mechanics due to his belief that the "average player's gaming experience is quite low, so you have to be really careful not to alienate or overwhelm them early with complex controls or mechanics", and he wanted to make a simple game as his first indie title.

The iOS version of Hackycat was made unavailable in 2017 after Apple's drop of support for 32-bit applications and subsequent delisting from the app store, and was rereleased by GameClub in 2019, and later ported to Android in 2020.

== Reception ==
Reception

Review scores
| Publication | Score |
|---|---|
| Gamezebo | 4.5/5 (iOS) |
| TouchArcade | 4/5 (iOS) |
| 148Apps | 4/5 (iOS) |
| Pocket Gamer | 7/10 (iOS) |

Hackycat received generally positive reviews from critics, with reviewers noting its gameplay as 'difficult and addictive', and praising its 'cute' cartoon graphics. Den of Geek described the game as "incredibly addicting", and TouchArcade called the game "utterly silly" and "adorable", praising the game's presentation and "solid" gameplay, expressing that the game is "legitimately challenging" with multiple cats on-screen.

Gamezebo praised the game's "sense of humor" that compliments its cartoon graphics, and called it "truly one of the most fun and addictive time wasters [on mobile] to date". Pocket Gamer praised the game's "charm and warm humour" in its presentation, further calling it "lovely to look at", and expressed that the game's unlockables add to its longevity.

148Apps praised the game's art style and gameplay, expressing that the concept of kicking cats could have been in "terribly bad taste", but "its cartoon style nature ensures that Hackycat is simply mindless fun".
