= Miles Tulett =

Former Australian television personality

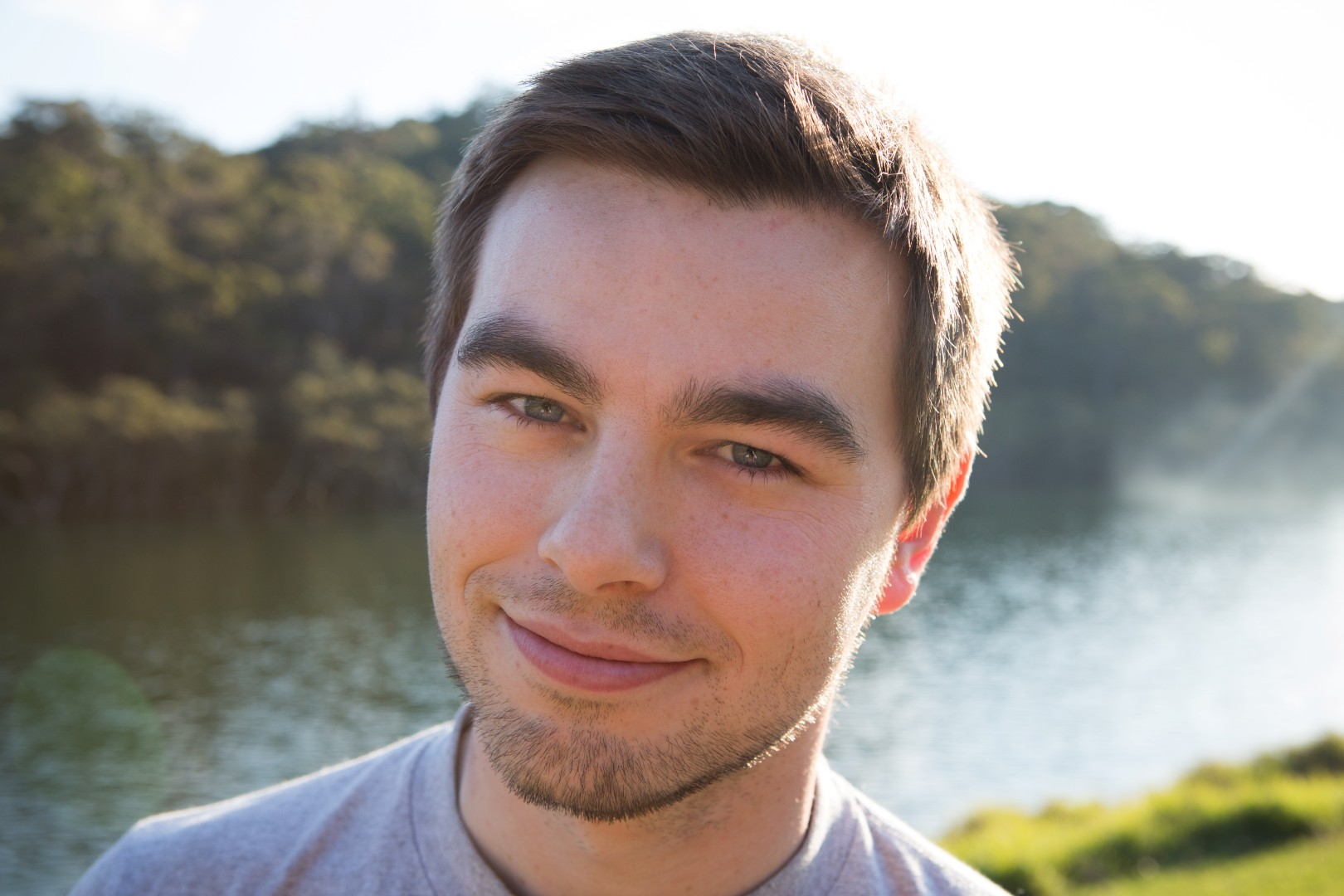
- Miles Tulett (2012)
- Born: 24 December 1987 (age 38); Sydney, Australia
- Other name: Dr Daneel
- Occupation: Television personality
- Known for: Good Game

Miles Tulett (born 24 December 1987) is a former Australian television personality. He was a supporting host for the video gaming talk show program Good Game where he went by the nickname "Dr Daneel".

== Early life ==
Miles grew up in Mount Kuring-gai, Sydney.

== Career ==
=== Early career ===
Early in his career, Miles worked in a call centre.

=== Good Game ===
In 2006, Miles was chosen to be the host for the segment "Build Your Own Machine" on the video game talk show Good Game. On 19 September 2006, he made his debut on the show which each week he would teach step by step how to build your own custom computer tower. In 2007 for the second season, he hosted the segment "Ask the Doc" where he would answer questions sent in by the viewers relating to computer tech problems.

=== Departure from Good Game ===
Miles left the show after two seasons to pursue his studies at university and because he felt that his segment was no longer hardware-oriented. He returned for an interview for the 100th episode on 24 August 2009.

=== After Good Game ===
Since leaving Good Game, Miles has worked at Allianz Australia as a server build manager and as a core application support specialist. He also founded and runs the Sydney-based boutique computer company ThrustPC.
