= 1933 in Australian literature =

This article presents a list of the historical events and publications of Australian literature during 1933.

== Books ==
- Eric Baume – Half Caste
- Miles Franklin – Bring the Monkey
- Ion Idriess – Drums of Mer
- G. B. Lancaster – Pageant
- Norman Lindsay
  - Pan in the Parlour
  - Saturdee
- Louise Mack – Teens Triumphant
- Jack McLaren – The Money Stones
- Harold Mercer – Amazon Island
- Alice Grant Rosman – Protecting Margot
- F. J. Thwaites – Flames of Convention
- Arthur W. Upfield – The Great Melbourne Cup Mystery

== Short stories ==
- Katharine Susannah Prichard – "The Bride of Far-Away"
- Henry Handel Richardson
  - "The Professor's Experiment"
  - "The Wrong Turning"

== Children's and Young Adult ==
- Mary Grant Bruce – Billabong's Luck
- Kenneth Slessor – Funny Farmyard
- Dorothy Wall – Blinky Bill: The Quaint Little Australian

== Poetry ==
- E. J. Brady – Wardens of the Seas : Poems
- C. J. Dennis – "Tall Timber"
- A. B. Paterson – The Animals Noah Forgot
- Kenneth Slessor – Darlinghurst Nights

== Non-fiction ==
- Frank Clune – Try Anything Once

== Drama ==
- Edmund Barclay – An Antarctic Epic

== Awards and honours ==
=== Literary ===
| Award | Author | Title | Publisher |
|---|---|---|---|
| ALS Gold Medal | G. B. Lancaster | Pageant | Century |

== Births ==
A list, ordered by date of birth (and, if the date is either unspecified or repeated, ordered alphabetically by surname) of births in 1933 of Australian literary figures, authors of written works or literature-related individuals follows, including year of death.

- 30 January – Jennifer Strauss, poet and academic
- 21 March – Annette Macarthur-Onslow, writer and book illustrator (died 2026)
- 3 June – Vivian Smith, poet
- 30 June – John Button, writer and politician (died 2008)
- 4 July – Fay Zwicky, poet and critic (died 2017)
- 10 July – Kevin Gilbert, poet and playwright (died 1993)
- 14 August – Bryce Courtenay, novelist (born in Johannesburg)(died 2012)
- 21 December – Wendy Richardson, playwright

Unknown date

- Wendy Scarfe, novelist, biographer and poet

== Deaths ==
A list, ordered by date of death (and, if the date is either unspecified or repeated, ordered alphabetically by surname) of deaths in 1933 of Australian literary figures, authors of written works or literature-related individuals follows, including year of birth.

- 2 February – John Le Gay Brereton, poet (born 1871)
- 1 April – Gilbert White, clergyman and poet (born 1859)
- 10 April — Ernest Buley, journalist and author (born 1869)
- 15 April – Alfred Stephens, writer and critic (born 1865)
- 27 August – George Robertson, publisher (born 1860)
- 6 November – Grant Hervey, poet (born 1880)

== See also ==
- 1933 in Australia
- 1933 in literature
- 1933 in poetry
- List of years in Australian literature
- List of years in literature
