= Men at the Top =

- Genre: Talk show
- Presented by: Eric Baume
- Country of origin: Australia
- Original language: English

Production
- Running time: 30 minutes

Original release
- Network: ABC Television
- Release: 1959

Related
- Women at the Top

Men at the Top is an Australian television series which aired in 1959 on ABC. It was an interview series hosted by Eric Baume, and proved short-lived, running for about four months. It aired in a half-hour time-slot. Produced in Sydney, it was kinescoped for showing in Melbourne (it is not known if it was also shown in Adelaide and Brisbane).

This was one of five series with Eric Baume which aired during the 1950s. From 1956 to 1958 he hosted This I Believe, in 1957 he hosted the short-lived State Your Case, in 1959 to 1961 he hosted Eric Baume's Viewpoint, additionally he was a semi-regular on Leave it to the Girls during 1957.

The series had a short-lived spin-off, Women at the Top, without Baume.
