= Ena Harwood =

Australian television and radio personality

- Born: Ena Mary Fitzallen; 23 April 1913; Mathinna, Tasmania
- Died: 21 July 1993 (aged 80); Sydney
- Occupation(s): Television and radio personality, actress
- Television: Beauty and the Beast, The Mike Walsh Show, Carson's Law
- Spouse(s): Horace Barclay Harwood (m. 1942, d. 1960)
- Children: 3 (including Andrew)

Ena Mary Harwood (née Fitzallen, 23 April 1913 – 21 July 1993) was an Australian television and radio personality.

She was best known for being one of the longest serving "beauties" on Beauty and the Beast and for her appearances on The Mike Walsh Show.

== Career ==
Harwood had ambitions of becoming an actress during her younger years, and took private acting lessons in London with Cicely Berry. Returning to Australia she had minor roles in the Independent Theatre stage productions of Rhinoceros and Period of Adjustment. She was chosen by Doris Fitton to star in the production of God's Red Earth which had originally been written as a radio play by Coral Lansbury.

In the 1960s, Harwood become a fan of the Seven Network's daytime talk show Beauty and the Beast, hosted by her friend Eric Baume. After she told Baume of her desire to be on the program, he arranged for Harwood to meet with the producer. Harwood subsequently became one of the longest serving, (second only to Pat Firman) "beauties" of all the various incarnations of the show hosted by various "beasts" including Baume and subsequently Stuart Wagstaff and John Laws.

From 1975, she anchored "The Female Forum" segment on The Mike Walsh Show on the Nine Network for five years.

As an actress, she appeared on two episodes of Carson's Law in 1984. That same year, she was part of the Seven Hills Productions radio program Ask The Girls hosted by Bernard King, which followed a similar format to Beauty and the Beast.

In August 1990, Harwood had a small role in an episode of Home and Away.

=== Television ===
Year	Title	Role	Type
1964; 1966–1968	Beauty and the Beast	Regular Panellist – Herself	TV series
1966–1968; 1969	Beauty and the Beast	Regular Paneliist – Herself	TV series
1970; 1980	Beauty and the Beast	Regular Panellist – Herself	TV series
1975–1979	The Mike Walsh Show	Regular – Herself	TV series
1980; 1982–1983	Beauty and the Beast	Regular Pannellist – Herself	TV series
1982–1983	Beauty and the Beast	Regular Panellist – Herself	TV series
1984	Carson's Law	Guest role: Mrs. Preston	TV series, 2 episodes
1990	Home and Away	Guest role: Woman	TV series, 1 episode

== Personal life and death ==
On 10 November 1942, she married Horace Barclay Harwood at St Mark's Church of England in Darling Point. They had three children, including Andrew Harwood.

Harwood's husband died suddenly at their residence in Bellevue Hill on 27 October 1960.

Harwood suffered asthma throughout her life, and in 1969 suffered a particularly severe asthma attack prompting her son Andrew to rush her to hospital. Specialists told her that she would have only survived another four hours without seeking medical attention. Andrew too suffered from asthma throughout his life and died after a severe asthma attack in 2008.

Harwood died at the age of 80 on 21 July 1993.

After her death, her son Andrew Harwood was charged with social security fraud, accused of cashing $27,400 worth of his mother's pension cheques for a period of three years after her death.

He was suspended from his evening radio program on 2UE during the investigation but was later cleared of any wrongdoing when the magistrate at St James Local Court dismissed the fraud charge after the Director of Public Prosecutions failed to offer any evidence.
