= Jeanne Little =

Australian entertainer (1938–2020)

Jeanne Little OAM
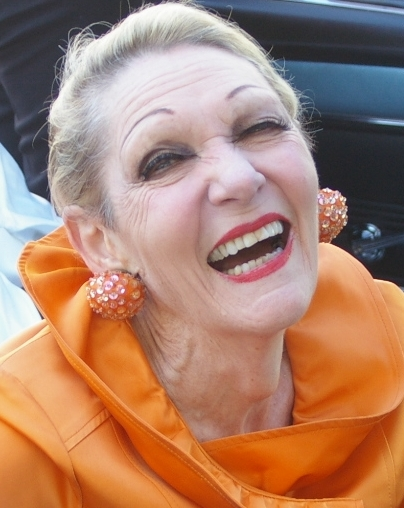
- Little in 2008
- Born: Jeanne Mitchell; 11 May 1938; Sydney, New South Wales, Australia
- Died: 7 November 2020 (aged 82); Sydney, New South Wales, Australia
- Occupations: Television personality; actress; stage performer; singer; deviser; costume designer
- Years active: 1969–2011
- Known for: Appearance on The Mike Walsh Show, Midday with Ray Martin, Beauty and the Beast
- Spouse: Barry Little (m. 1971–2019) (his death)
- Children: 1, Katie Little

Jeanne Mitchell (11 May 1938 – 7 November 2020), professionally known as Jeanne Little (pronounced 'Jeanie Little'), was an Australian entertainer, comedienne and television personality who won the Gold Logie award in 1977 (a dual honour that year with Don Lane winning as Best Male Personality). Her first success on television was on The Mike Walsh Show which earned her the Gold Logie plus two other Logies. Other television of appearances include Midday with Ray Martin and GMA with Bert Newton. She became well known for her flamboyant outfits, over-the-top personality and her trademark catch phrase said in a drawling speech of "Oh Dahling".

She was a regular panel member on the talk show Beauty and the Beast, during the tenure of "Beasts" Stan Zemanek and Doug Mulray.

She became known internationally after appearing on Sir Michael Parkinson's eponymous chat show. Her success transferred to cabaret and theatre when she landed roles on Jerry's Girls, Legends and Marlene – A Tribute to Dietrich.

== Biography ==
Little was born in Sydney, Australia. She made her television debut on Network Ten's The Mike Walsh Show in September 1974. Invited on as a guest showcasing designer maternity clothes, Little quickly became a regular, eventually (after a stint at Channel Seven) moving with the Walsh Show to Channel Nine. The Seven Network had attempted two short-lived shows featuring Little's unique talents: Jeanne's Little Show (a variety/chat series) and Cuckoo in the Nest, a situation comedy in which she played a wacky Auntie Mame-type character. As part of The Mike Walsh Show team again, Little wowed and won audiences for the next 15 years.

She was a guest on the Midday with Ray Martin show, and her appearance on the BBC's Michael Parkinson chat show so startled London critics she had the London Evening News saying: "What a woman! With her in the house you wouldn't want a TV." Among the overseas guests she appeared with were US actor/comedians Phyllis Diller and George Burns, and British theatre actor Danny La Rue.

In 1976, Little won a Gold Logie for most popular television personality, and subsequently won two other Logies for her work on the Mike Walsh Show. Before the 2008 Logie Awards, Little reflected on what her Gold Logie win in 1976 meant to her, "Well daaahling, I was in total shock. Absolute shock, I thought, 'What me? Winning a Gold Logie? For heaven's sake this is ridiculous, there's been a mistake.'" During her heyday on television, she released a single entitled "Dahling, Are You Paying Attention?" which was named after her well-known catchcry.

In 1988, she performed at the Royal Command Bicentennial Concert in Sydney before the Prince and Princess of Wales. Her stage career took off with Jerry's Girls, in which American director John Frost teamed Little with well known entertainers Marcia Hines, Debra Byrne and Judi Connelli. She then subsequently appeared in Legends with Kerrie Biddell, Toni Lamond, and Nancye Hayes at the Sydney Opera House.

She appeared in theatre since 1978, including Marlene, Little's one-woman tribute to actress and singer Marlene Dietrich, which toured Australia and the US to critical acclaim, followed by More of a Little, which was filled with songs, chat, and anecdotes, as well as A Tribute to Marilyn Monroe.

In the late 1990s, through to the mid-2000s, Little appeared on the panel discussion show Beauty and the Beast, with "beast" Stan Zemanek.

In February 2011, it was announced Little was suffering from Alzheimer's disease, which was initially diagnosed in 2009. In August 2014, family members advised that Little's illness had advanced to the stage that she "no longer knows where she is or what's going on around her".

== Personal life ==
Little married interior decorator Barry Little in 1971. Their daughter Katie Little is a writer, comedienne, music producer and singer. Katie is patron of the Jeanne Little Alzheimer's Research Fund, which has been set up in her mother's honour to raise funds for ongoing research into the disease. In 2019 Katie released a black humour memoir titled Catch a Falling Star - A Story About Growing Up With Jeanne Little.

She was diagnosed with rapid-onset Alzheimer's disease in 2009, and was cared for in a Sydney nursing home, where her husband Barry (1929–2019) also resided.

Little died on 7 November 2020 at the age of 82.

== Honours ==
Association	Year	Award	Work	Results
Logie Awards	1977	Gold Logie	Various	Won
Logie Award	1976	Most Popular Female	The Mike Walsh Show	Won
Australian Government	2001	Centenary Medal	Service to the Community	Honoured
Australian Government	2001	Order of Australia		Honoured
