= Johnny Frisbie =

Cook Islands author (born 1932)

Johnny Frisbie QSM
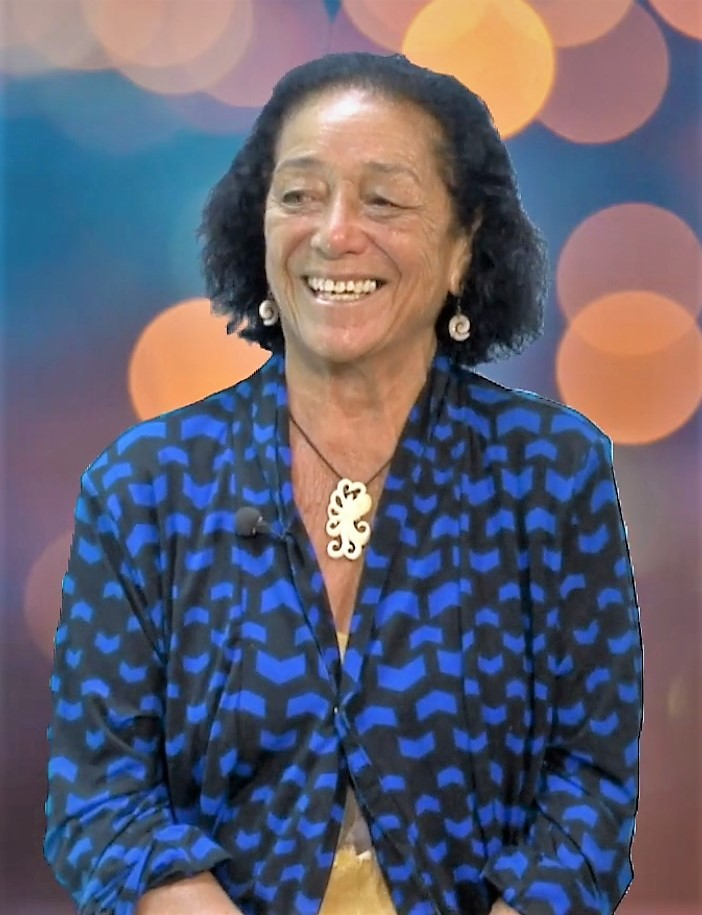
- Frisbee in 2019
- Born: Florence Ngatokura Frisbie; 19 June 1932 (age 93); Papeete, Tahiti
- Occupations: Author; broadcaster
- Known for: Children's literature

Florence Ngatokura "Johnny" Frisbie QSM (born 19 June 1932), also known as Johnny Frisbie Hebenstreit, is a Cook Islands author. Her autobiographical children's novel, Miss Ulysses of Puka-Puka (1948), was the first published literary work by a Pacific Islander woman author.

== Biography ==
Frisbie was born in Papeete, Tahiti, the second child of American writer Robert Dean Frisbie and Ngatokura ‘A Mata’a. In 1934 the family moved to Ngatokura's home of Pukapuka in the Cook Islands, where Frisbie was raised. As a child she helped her father type up his writings and kept a journal in Pukapukan, Cook Islands Māori, and English, which she learned from her father's library and from comic books. Following the death of her mother in 1939 the family left Pukapuka and travelled to Manihiki and Rarotonga before settling on Suwarrow in January 1942. Later that year the atoll was hit by a tropical cyclone which washed away 16 of its 22 islets; the Frisbies survived by tying themselves to trees and taking shelter in a tree house. The family continued to travel around the South Pacific until her father's death of tetanus in 1948. During this time, Frisbie published Miss Ulysses of Puka-Puka, dealing with her life on the atoll and her bond with her father and family.

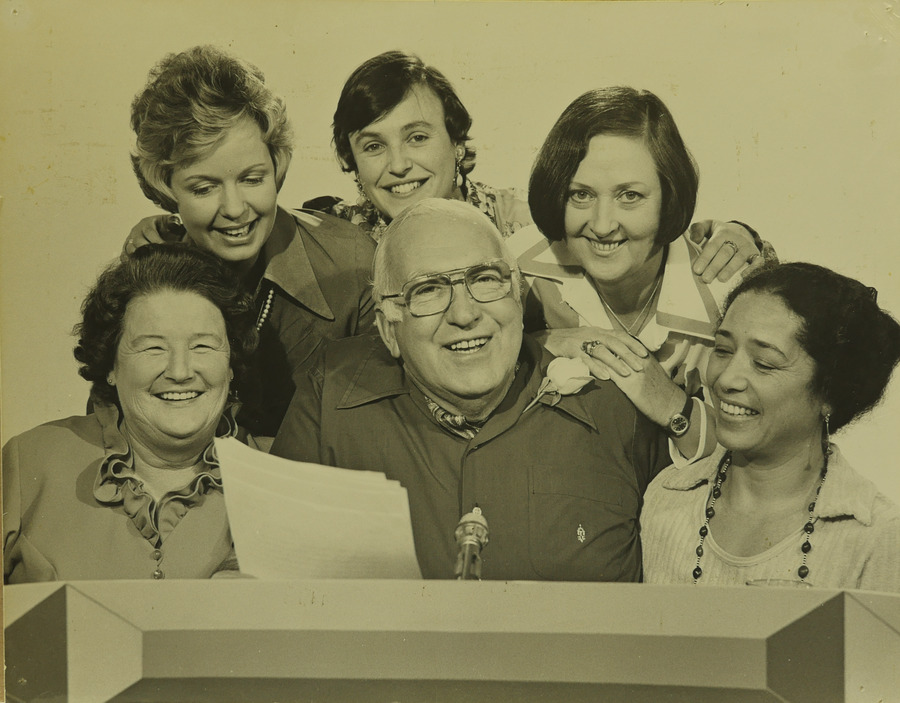
Frisbie (far right) as a panellist on Beauty and the Beast, with Shona McFarlane (second from right) and host Selwyn Toogood (centre)

Following her father's death, the family was split up to be raised by friends and relatives of her father in New Zealand and Hawaii. In 1950 Florence moved to O‘ahu to be raised by the Engle family. She attended Punahou School in Honolulu, and after graduating the author James A. Michener encouraged her to take a job in Japan as a secretary in the military. In 1956 she married TV personality Carl 'Kini Popo' Hebenstreit. In 1959 she published a biography of her family, The Frisbies of the South Seas. They subsequently moved to New Zealand, where Frisbie lived for thirty years, working for the University of Otago and writing children's books. After her husband acquired a commercial radio licence she became involved in commercial radio, and then in television, working with Selwyn Toogood as a panelist on the New Zealand version of Beauty and the Beast. She served on the Māori and South Pacific Arts Council and was later a founding member of P.A.C.I.F.I.C.A. She subsequently returned to the Cook Islands, and then Hawaii.

In 2015 Frisbie returned to Pukapuka to participate in a documentary about life on the atoll. The film The Island in Me (originally titled Homecoming) debuted in November 2021 at the Hawaii International Film Festival.

== Bibliography ==
- Miss Ulysses of Puka-Puka (1948)
- The Frisbies of the South Seas (1959)
- 'O se po maninoa (1988)
- Pō malū (1988)
- O le vaa fou : o se tala mai Pukapuka (1994)
- I tua atu o le tafatafailagi (1995)
- Nights of the Moon (2022)

== Honours ==
In the 1991 Queen's Birthday Honours, Frisbie was awarded the Queen's Service Medal for public services.
