= Clive Robertson (broadcaster) =

Australian broadcaster (1945–2024)

- Born: Clive Alexander Robertson; 28 December 1945; Katoomba, New South Wales, Australia
- Died: 1 December 2024 (aged 78); Katoomba, New South Wales, Australia
- Occupations: Radio presenter and television host
- Years active: 1967–2024
- Known for: Radio presenter at 2GB and ABC
- Spouse: Penny Cook (divorced)

Clive Alexander Robertson (28 December 1945 – 1 December 2024) was an Australian radio and television presenter in Sydney who was heard on both the AM and FM bands for over 40 years.

== Early life ==
Robertson was born in Katoomba, New South Wales, in 1945. He left school at the age of 16 to begin work on a farm (including his beloved "Massey-Harris tractor"), going on to work for his father (a lawyer), later doing court work, and then moving on to become an electrical apprentice as well as running wires for the Postmaster-General's Department. He later worked on the railways cleaning steam locomotives, and also driving them from time to time, which would fuel a lifelong fascination with them.

== Career ==
In 1967 with the advent of talk radio, Robertson began his broadcasting career working at a number of stations in the southwest of Western Australia. In 1972 he joined the Australian Broadcasting Corporation (ABC) in Sydney, beginning on the radio station 2BL. He moved to Canberra a few months later and worked on 2CY and 2CN. A well known part of his breakfast show on 2BL was his daily tête-à-tête with either Caroline Jones or Margaret Throsby. He also presented the 7 pm television news for the ABC.

In 1980, he worked at 2DAY-FM, but returned to the ABC some months later.

From 1982 to 1988 he was host of the Beauty and the Beast television talk show on Network Ten. Leaving ABC radio, he then moved to the Seven Network where he hosted the news program 11AM, and in 1985 became the host of Newsworld. Robertson took a unique approach to Newsworld, and his later news show on the Nine Network, Robbo's World Tonight:

I thought I'll muck around and then they'll take me off it, you see. And it didn't work that way ... I'd have to say the order of things especially at Channel 9, the order of news items. And if I said, "Look, this is really important", I'd look at the camera and say, "This is a really important story" and set it up, and if it was an important story, then the audience think, "Oh this guy's a good filter." If you said, "Look, this is a silly item, I don't know why we're running it" and you run it and it is a silly item, you've got them. And it's not a con. What that program did is different from most news programs is gave things what they really were worth ... and did that go down well with the journalists? Have a guess Peter. "He's ruining our station" and all that rubbish. I mean, we get a new item in at, say, 10.30 at night and I'd say, "By the way, you'll see this at 6 o'clock tomorrow night" and they'll say it's the latest, "you know better". "You can't say things like that." Well, you know, come on, so journalists are a bit thick as you know...

— ABC Talking Heads interview

Over the years Robertson also presented radio programs on 6VA, 6TZ, 6IX, 2UE, 2GB, 2SM and ABC Classic FM, as well as TV station STW-9 and Network Ten. In 2006 he returned to national TV screens on the ABC Television show Agony Aunts.

Robertson filled in for Stan Zemanek on 2UE from 8 pm to midnight just prior to Christmas in 2006. After the new year, he was moved to the midnight to dawn overnight timeslot. Robertson left 2UE in March 2008, not able to cope with the hours, but returned to 3 pm to 6 pm on weekend afternoons, and later the 2UE Nights program (8:00 pm to 12:00 am).

== On-air personality ==
Robertson was known for his wry wit and humorous dealings with talk-back callers, and his outspoken manner. He said that Perth radio station 6IX fired him because he would not use the station's slogan, "Have a happy day".

During his late-night TV news, he once showed the weather forecast displayed on a board. Beside "Brisbane" was the word "pooey".

In his morning programme on ABC Classic FM, he occasionally talked with the show's producer, Ivan Lloyd, the man who selected the music each day. Although Robertson claimed to be untrained in Classical music, his interest and enthusiasm was obvious and he was especially fond of string quartets. In his talk between pieces of music, he sometimes referred to his lawn mowing at home, and revealed that his lawn mower was, naturally, named "Lorna", or "Lawner", but he then explained this should not be confused with "Lorna" who managed the ABC's music library and helped with selecting pieces to be played.

== Personal life and death ==
Robertson was married twice. His second marriage was to actress Penny Cook. Both marriages ended in divorce.

Clive Robertson died aged 78 on Sunday, 1 December 2024 after a battle with cancer. His death was not publicly revealed until 12 December.
