= News Magazine (TV program) =

Australian TV program

- Genre: News broadcasting
- Presented by: Brenda Marshall
- Country of origin: Australia
- Original language: English

Production
- Running time: 10 minutes; 20 minutes

Original release
- Network: HSV-7
- Release: 1958 – 1960

News Magazine was an Australian television program which aired from 1958 to 1960 on Melbourne station HSV-7. Hosted by HSV personality Brenda Marshall, little is known about the show, however it is notable as an early example of an Australian news program. It aired in a daytime time-slot on Tuesdays, and during its run the time-slot running time varied from 10 minutes to 20 minutes (assuming the series had a sponsor, the running time minus commercials is unknown). Archival status of the series is not known, however as few Australian newscasts are known to survive from the 1960s, the program may be lost, though this is not confirmed.

The episode broadcast 12 January 1960 aired at 3:30 pm, against U.S. series Treasury Men in Action on GTV-9, while ABV-2 did not offer any programming until 4:00 pm. The episode broadcast 3 November 1959 aired at 2:30 pm and aired against U.S. series Dear Phoebe on GTV-9, while ABV-2 did not offer any programming until 3:00 pm.

== See also ==
- This I Believe – a 1956–1958 news show on ATN-7 in Sydney
