= Tom Neale =

New Zealand survivalist and author

- Born: 6 November 1902; Wellington, New Zealand
- Died: 27 November 1977 (aged 75)
- Known for: Living alone on the island of Anchorage in the Suwarrow atoll
- Notable work: An Island To Oneself

Thomas Francis Neale (6 November 1902 – 30 November 1977) was a New Zealander who spent much of his life in the Cook Islands, and a total of 16 years – in three sessions – living alone on the island of Anchorage in the Suwarrow atoll; the basis of his popular autobiography An Island To Oneself.

== Early life ==
Thomas Francis Neale was born in Wellington, New Zealand, but his family moved to Greymouth while he was still a baby, and then to Timaru when he was seven years old. His parents were Frank Frederick Neale and Emma Sarah Neale (née Chapman). He joined the Royal New Zealand Navy as a young man, but at 18 was too old to become an apprentice seaman, and signed on as an apprentice engineer instead. For the next four years, Neale travelled through the Pacific Islands on Navy ships, before buying his way out of the Navy to have greater freedom to see the islands independently. He spent the next six years wandering from island to island, taking short term jobs on inter-island trade ships, clearing bush or planting bananas.

After a few months back in Timaru in 1931, Neale returned to the Pacific and settled in Moorea, Tahiti, where he lived until 1943, supporting himself with odd jobs and enjoying a private life. He was then offered a job as a relieving storekeeper in the Cook Islands, running small shops in various islands while their normal keepers were on leave. As storekeeper he was also an advisor to the local communities. He met with author Robert Dean Frisbie in Rarotonga, and was entranced by his tales of the atoll of Suwarrow, where Frisbie had lived with his family. In 1945, Neale had the opportunity to visit Suwarrow briefly when a ship dropped in stores for the World War II coast-watchers living there. He decided that this was the place he wanted to live.

== First stay on Suwarrow ==
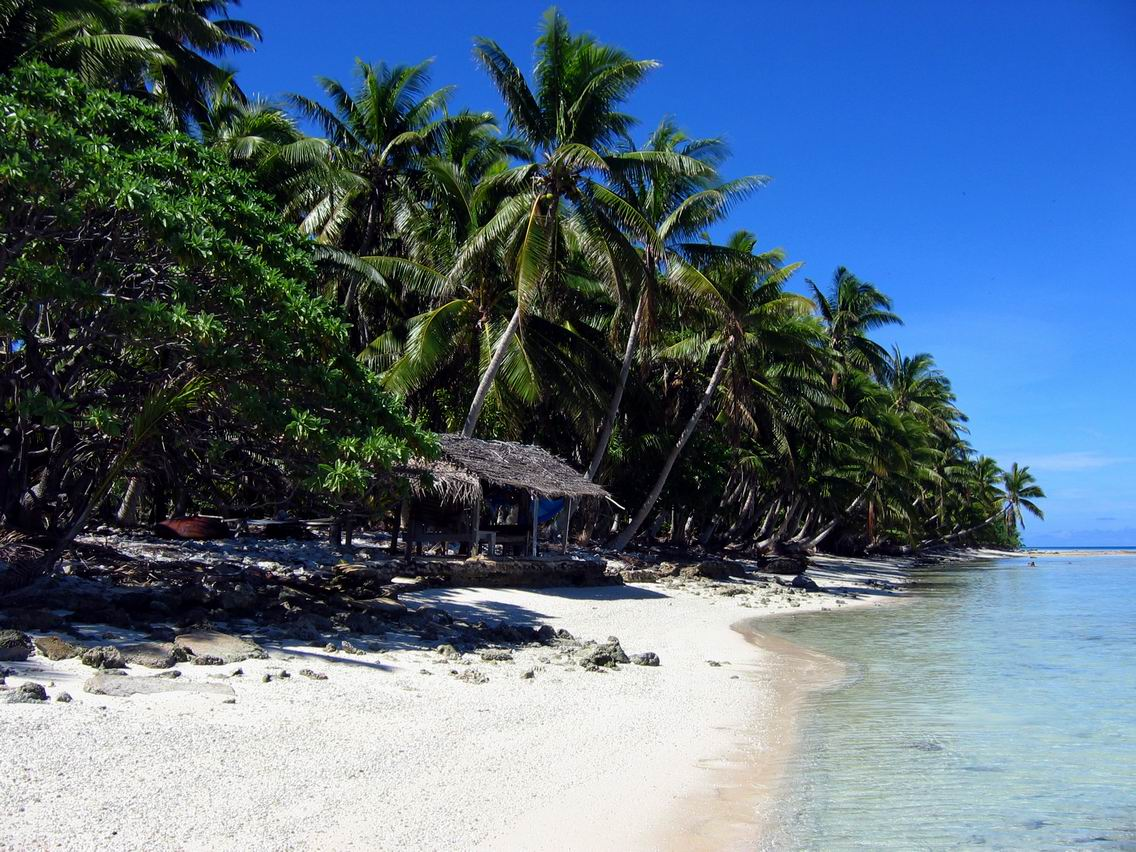
Anchorage Island, Suwarrow Atoll, 2005

In October 1952 he had an opportunity to book a passage on a ship passing close to Suwarrow, uninhabited since the end of the war. The boat dropped him off with two cats and all the supplies he could scrape together on the islet of Anchorage, about a mile long and a few hundred feet wide. A hut with water tanks, some books, and a badly damaged boat remained from the habitation by the coast-watchers. They had also left wild pigs and chickens on the atoll. The pigs were a liability as they destroyed vegetation and made planting a garden impossible; Neale built a hunting stand in a tree and speared the pigs over the course of several months. He planted a garden, domesticated the chickens, and repaired the boat. For the most part he lived on fish, crayfish, chicken, eggs, paw-paw, coconut, and breadfruit.

Ten months after arriving at Suwarrow, Neale had his first visitors: two couples on a yacht, who had been advised of Neale's existence by the British Consul in Tahiti and asked to call in to check on him. They stayed a couple of nights. The visitors gave Neale a new plan: to rebuild the pier which had been built on Anchorage during the Second World War, but which had been wrecked during a cyclone in 1942. It took six months of intermittent hard labour. A day after he completed the project, a major storm hit the islet destroying the pier.

According to his autobiography, in May 1954, Neale injured his back throwing the anchor from his boat. He returned to his hut on the opposite side of the atoll with difficulty, and lay semi-paralysed for four days. A couple on a yacht arrived at the atoll not knowing of his existence, discovered him in pain, and were able to nurse him back to health. They notified the Cook Islands government, who sent a ship that took him back two weeks later. However, according to biographers A. H. Helm and W. H. Percival, Neale returned to Rarotonga in July 1954. The problem with his back occurred a couple of months after he went back to Suwarrow in 1956. Although Neale thought at the time his back problem was a slipped disc, it was actually arthritis. Percival and Helm incorrectly reported that he returned to Suwarrow in 1956. His diary held by his daughter Stella confirmed that he returned to Rarotonga in 1954. He married in June 1956 to a woman, Sarah Haua of Palmerston Island on Rarotonga.

== Second stay ==
Neale wished to return to Suwarrow once his back was fully healed, but the government did not want the responsibility for him. He married Sarah Haua (born c. 1924) on 15 June 1956. They had two children, Arthur and Stella.

In March–April 1960 he was able to return to the atoll, this time with more carefully chosen and more extensive provisions. During this stay, one of his visitors was by helicopter from a passing American warship; the helicopter could only stay half an hour before the ship was out of range. British author Noel Barber heard of Neale's life on the island from a report by the United States Navy and paid him a visit. Fourteen months later, his next visit was from an old friend from Rarotonga, investigating rumours that Neale had died. Many months later another yacht visited, with a couple and their daughter. A squall hit the lagoon that night, the yacht's anchoring cable parted, and it foundered on a reef. The three lived with Neale for a couple of months, but successfully signalled a passing ship with a mirror, and were rescued.

On 27 December 1963, after three and a half years on the island, Neale voluntarily returned to Rarotonga. This decision was due in part to a group of pearl divers who paid periodic visits to Suwarrow; he had found their presence increasingly hard to tolerate. But the "predominant reason was a very simple one. I realized I was getting on, and the prospect of the lonely death did not particularly appeal to me."

His autobiography An Island to Oneself recounts his life through his first and second stay on the atoll. It was written with assistance from Barber, who wrote an introduction to it. It sold well and allowed Neale to fund a much greater store of provisions for his final stay.

== Third stay and death ==
In Neale's absence, a number of others visited or took up temporary residence on the island. In 1964, June von Donop, a former accountant from Honolulu, lived alone in Neale's house on Suwarrow for a week, while her crewmates on the schooner Europe stayed on board their vessel. In 1965–66 Michael Swift lived alone on Suwarrow, but he was not familiar with survival techniques and had a hard time finding sufficient food. Many other visitors to the island during Neale's absence (one of them Chögyam Trungpa's former student P. Howard Useche) left messages for him.

Neale returned to the atoll in June 1967. He stayed there until 1977, when he was found ill with stomach cancer by a yacht and taken to Rarotonga. After treatment by Milan Brych, he died eight months later. His grave is in the RSA cemetery on Rarotonga, opposite the airport.

== Footnotes ==
1. . Neale's gravestone gives his dates of birth and death as 2 November 1902 – 29 November 1977. His death certificate gives his death date as 30 November. His daughter says the correct figures are 6 and 27 November.
