= Robert Dean Frisbie =

American novelist

- Born: April 17, 1896; Cleveland, United States
- Died: November 19, 1948 (aged 52); Avatiu, Cook Islands
- Other name: Ropati
- Occupations: Novelist; travel writer; trading station operator
- Partner: Ngatokorua (died January 14, 1939)
- Children: Charles Mataa, Florence Ngatokorua "Whiskey Johnny", William Hopkins "Hardpan Jake," Elaine Metua
- Relatives: Adam West
- Writing career
- Genre: travel literature

Robert Dean Frisbie (April 17, 1896 - November 19, 1948) was an American writer of travel literature about Polynesia.

== Life ==
Robert Dean Frisbie was born in Cleveland, Ohio, on April 17, 1896, the son of Arthur Grazly Frisbie and Florence Benson. As a young man, he left his parental home to serve in the U.S. Army during World War I. After discharge from the military, doctors told him that his health was so bad that he would not survive another American winter. So, in 1920, he decided to explore the islands of the South Pacific Ocean.

He arrived at his first destination, Tahiti, in that year, settled down to lead a life as a plantation owner in Papeete, and began to write about his travels. He also established the South Seas News and Pictorial Syndicate and began sending stories back to the U.S. for publication. In later voyages through Polynesia (spanning his entire lifetime), he regularly visited the Cook Islands, Samoa and French Polynesia.

In writing down his observations of life in the Pacific, Frisbie followed the footsteps of other famous 19th century South Sea writers. One of his major influences was Robert Louis Stevenson. He was also well informed of the work of fellow travel writers in his time, with whom he kept in touch.

=== Life on Puka–Puka ===
In Tahiti, Frisbie (dubbed: "Ropati," a phonetic approximation of "Robert" [en: Writer]) met Charles Nordhoff and James Norman Hall, well-known co-authors of the Mutiny on the Bounty series. This encouraged Frisbie to write his first complete narrative, which marked the starting point of his career. The Book of Puka-Puka, published in 1929 by The Century Company, related the tale of his eternal search for solitude on the far-flung Northern Cook atoll of Pukapuka. Frisbie writes that life on Pukapuka enabled him to escape "the faintest echo from the noisy clamour of the civilised world."

On Pukapuka Frisbie met 16-year-old Ngatokorua (Also known as Inangaro which, when translated, means "Desire"). They were married in 1928 on Penrhyn, Northern Cook Islands. "Nga" became the mother of their five children: Charles, Florence, William, Elaine and Ngatokorua. In 1930 the family sailed back to Tahiti and Frisbie started working on his second autobiography, My Tahiti (Little Brown & Co., 1937) and started working on another book, A Child of Tahiti, which was never published.

=== Hurricane at Suwarrow ===
In the 1940s, after the death of Frisbie's wife, the family visited the uninhabited Northern Cook atoll Suwarrow and lived there for almost a year. The celebrated story of their hurricane survival on a tiny motu (islet) was serialized by in the Atlantic Monthly as The Story of an Island: Marooned by Request in 1943 and later in Frisbie's memoir The Island of Desire.

Another notable character in Frisbie's life was Tom Neale. A loner inspired by Frisbie's tales of isolation on Suwarrow, he also lived alone on the atoll on three occasions (1952–1954, 1960-1964 & 1967–1977). After he returned from his second visit in 1964, he wrote the book An Island to Myself (Doubleday, 1966), in which he credits Frisbie as his inspiration. The book was republished in Great Britain as An Island to Oneself (Collins, 1966).

=== Johnny Frisbie ===
Florence Frisbie (better known as Johnny) was born on June 19, 1932, in Papeete, Tahiti, the second child of Robert Dean and Ngatokorua Frisbie. As a youngster encouraged by her father to write, Johnny kept journals in three languages (including Pukapukan). At the age of 12 she began an autobiographical children's novel based on these journals, Miss Ulysses of Puka-Puka, which deals with her life on the atoll and her bond with her father and family. Miss Ulysses was published by Macmillan in 1948.

After her father's death in 1948, Johnny wrote another biography of her family, The Frisbies of the South Seas (Doubleday, 1959).

=== Death ===
In 1943, diagnosed with tuberculosis, Frisbie was evacuated by then U.S. Navy Lieutenant James Michener to a hospital on American Samoa. His recovery was spotty, but he continued to travel, write and publish until his death at age 52, on November 18 (or 19), 1948, in Avatiu (Cook Islands), from an apparent tetanus infection.

== Career ==
Robert Dean Frisbie produced a great number of sketches, articles and books that were printed by several publishers in America. His first article was Fei-hunting in Polynesia (1923, Forum).

Frisbie's autobiographical travel stories are of enduring value, offering detailed and humorous descriptions of island life in Polynesia and especially the Cook Islands. He also wrote many news stories for various periodicals like Pacific Islands Monthly. His work is characterized by a fervent quest for solitude, a deep concern for the plight of island locals confronted with external exploitation, and an unwavering ambition to craft the perfect American novel. His accomplishments remain remarkable, especially when viewed against the backdrop of his personal adversities.

== Works ==
Published books by Robert Dean Frisbie:

most books are still in print or available at book websites

- The Book of Puka-Puka (1929)
- Un Age d'Or (c1930) a non-fiction book written in French.
- My Tahiti (1937)
- Mr. Moonlight's Island (1939) (a novel largely based on the author's own life on the island.)
- The Island of Desire (The Story of a South Sea Trader) (1944)
- Amaru: A Romance of the South Seas (1945) (A novel)
- Dawn Sails North (1949) (A novel)

Articles by Robert Dean Frisbie:

- Fei-Hunting in Polynesia (1924)
- Palmleaf Gambling Hells (1925)
- The Island of Women (1926)
- Prize-Fighting in the Pacific (1926)
- Armchair Yachting: A Droll Discourse on the Rather Comfortable Technique of Yachting in the Tropics (1927)
- At Home in Puka-Puka (1928)
- Business as Usual (1928)
- Adventures in a Puka-Puka Library (1929)
- Fishing With King-of-the-Sky (1929)
- Fishing for Steak and Eggs (1929)
- The Sea Afire (1929)
- Mrs. Turtle Lays Her Eggs (1929)
- Puka-Puka Neighbors (1929)
- Magic Dances (1929)
- A Kanaka Voyage (1930)
- The Sex Taboo at Puka-Puka (1930)
- The Ghost of Alexander Perks, A.B. (1931)
- Americans in the South Seas (1931)
- Rum Row: Western (1932)
- Cinderella at Puka-Puka (1932)
- A Copra Island (1932)
- The South Sea Myth (1933)
- End of Oleaginous Culture? (1934)
- Uninhabited Island (1935)
- The Grandpapa of All the Fishes (1936)
- Unconventional Journey (1936)
- An Idyll in Polynesia (author uncertain) (1940)
- The Story of an Island: Marooned by Request (1943)
- Economic Debauchery of Polynesians by Friendly Troops (1944)
- Has Polynesia a Future Without a "Copra Economy"? (1944)
- Cannibal to Commando (1944)
- South Sea Authors (1944)
- Mr. Ward Thought It Subversive (1945)

By "Johnny" Florence Ngatokura (née Frisbie) Hebenstreit:

- Miss Ulysses of Puka-Puka (1948)
- The Frisbies of the South Seas (1959)

== Notes, sources and references ==
=== General references ===
- Blauwzee; Büch, Boudewijn; Atlas, 1994 (Dutch).
- Robert Dean Frisbie Society, Michael Uhlenkott (formed in 1995).
