= Half Caste (novel) =

Novel by Australian/NZ author Eric Baume

- Author: Eric Baume
- Language: English
- Genre: Novel
- Publisher: Macquarie Head Press
- Publication date: 1933
- Publication place: Australia
- Media type: Print
- Pages: 251 pp.
- Followed by: Burnt Sugar

Half Caste is a 1933 Australian novel by Eric Baume. It was Baume's best known novel.

The novel was one of the most popular Australian books of the year.

== Critical reception ==
The Bulletin said Baume "tells vividly and clearly, often poignantly, the problems that beset the half-caste Maori girl who is highly educated but is without money or social background."

The Australian Woman's Mirror called it "a frankly realistic and in parts savagely critical piece of writing."

== Adaptation ==
Film rights were acquired by United Artists in 1946. However no film was made.

== See also ==
- 1933 in Australian literature
