= Beauty and the Beast (talk show) =

- Genre: Talk show
- Presented by: Eric Baume; Stuart Wagstaff; Noel Ferrier; John Laws; Rex Mossop; Derryn Hinch; John Laws; Clive Robertson; Stan Zemanek; Doug Mulray
- Starring: Maggie Tabberer; Dita Cobb; Ena Harwood; Patricia Firman; Hazel Phillips; Noeline Brown; Freda Lesslie
- Country of origin: Australia
- Original language: English
- No. of seasons: 21
- No. of episodes: 2,000+

Production
- Running time: 60 minutes

Original release
- Network: Seven Network
- Release: 1964 – 1973
- Network: Seven Network
- Release: 1982
- Network: Network Ten
- Release: 1982 – 1983
- Network: Network Ten & FX
- Release: 1996 – 2002
- Network: W
- Release: 2005 – 2007

Beauty and the Beast is an Australian panel television talk show that has appeared in numerous versions since the early days of Australian television.

The concept of the series is that viewers write in asking for advice about personal problems such as family squabbles, questions of social etiquette, marriage problems, contraception, work or career problems.

The host of the program - usually an intentionally brusque and outspoken older male - the so-called "Beast" of the title presents each viewer question in turn and a panel of female celebrities - "the Beauties" serve as panellists who provide their advice on the problem and solutions, the panel then discuss the problem and the advice given offering opinions and views.

== History ==
The first version of the show began on the Seven Network in 1964, hosted by Eric Baume as the "Beast". Baume was later replaced by presenters including Stuart Wagstaff (1966–1968), Noel Ferrier (1969), John Laws (1970), and Rex Mossop (1971–1973).

The format was revived in 1982, with two rival versions, both carrying the same title, appearing on different networks. Network Ten's version had John Laws back as host, later replaced by Clive Robertson, whilst the Seven Network version was hosted by Derryn Hinch.

A 1990s version of the program ran on both Network Ten and Foxtel, hosted by radio broadcaster Stan Zemanek (1996–2001) and radio broadcaster Doug Mulray (2002). Network Ten along with FX aired the final episode in 2002.

The series returned on W exclusively in 2005 after a 3-year hiatus, with Stan Zemanek returning as host. Beauty and the Beast aired its final episode on W in early July 2007, with Zemanek passing away that same month. Since then the program has not returned to air.

== Notable "beauties" ==
=== Original cast ===
- Maggie Tabberer
- Dita Cobb
- Ena Harwood
- Patricia Firman
- Patricia Lovell
- Hazel Phillips
- Noeline Brown
- Freda Lesslie

=== Notable celebrity panellists ===
Other notable panelists on the later versions included

- Tracy Bartram
- Tracey Bevan
- Ann-Maree Biggar
- Diana Bowring
- Ita Buttrose
- Shelley Sykes
- Barbara Rogers
- Carlotta
- Jo Casamento
- Angela Catterns
- Beccy Cole
- Alyssa-Jane Cook
- Louise Crawford
- Clio Cresswell
- Elaine Davies
- Charlotte Dawson
- Delilah
- Penne Dennison
- Anne Deveson
- Miranda Devine
- Claire Dunne
- Maureen Duval
- Bianca Dye
- Susie Elelman
- Diana 'Bubbles' Fisher
- Lisa Forrest
- Rachel Friend
- Antonella Gambotto-Burke
- Chelsea Gibb
- Cleo Glyde
- Tottie Goldsmith
- Libbi Gorr
- Belinda Green
- Johanna Griggs
- Donna Gubbay
- Rose Hancock-Porteous
- Pauline Hanson
- Louisa Hatfield
- Fiona Horne
- Christa Hughes
- Frida Irving
- Shauna Jensen
- Leigh Johnson
- Gretel Killeen
- Renae Leith
- Rebecca Le Tourneau
- Jeanne Little
- Rachael Lloyd
- Jackie Loeb
- Prue MacSween
- Gillian Minervini
- Carol Moores
- Julia Morris
- Jan Murray
- Ali Mutch
- Indira Naidoo
- Judy Nunn
- Lisa Oldfield
- Dr. Cindy Pan
- Jacqueline Pascarl
- Carmelle Pavann
- Dr. Patricia Petersen
- Diana Rodger
- Kristine Stanley
- Heather Turland
- Rowena Wallace
- Lisa Wilkinson
- Sally Williams
- Rebecca Wilson
- Adriana Xenides
- Tania Zaetta

== New Zealand version ==
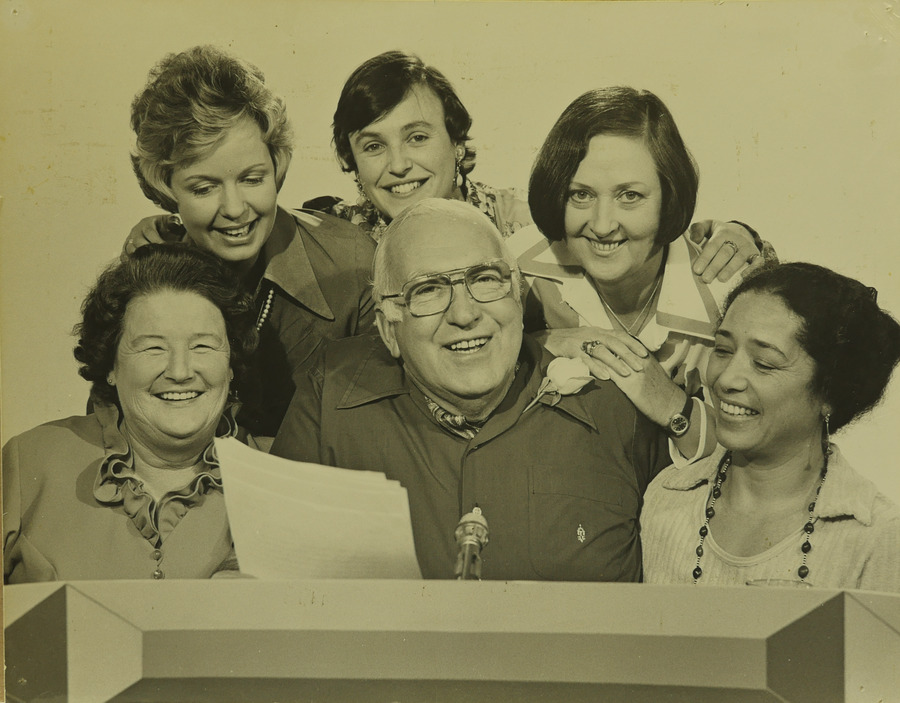
Selwyn Toogood (centre), host of the New Zealand version of Beauty and the Beast, surrounded by panellists (from left) Jean McLean, Denise Brady, Lorraine Isaacs (producer/director), Shona McFarlane, and Johnny Frisbie

The Beauty and the Beast format was adopted by TV One and, later, TVNZ as an afternoon television series that ran from 1976 to 1986. The show was first aired on Monday 2 February 1976 and recorded in the Dunedin studios from its inception until the end of 1981 when production moved to Christchurch in 1982. It returned to Dunedin in 1986.

The show featured Selwyn Toogood as the host with a four-woman panel. Notable panellists included Shona McFarlane, Catherine Tizard (later Governor-General), Catherine Saunders and Johnny Frisbie. The show occasionally featured male panellists such as art dealer Trevor Plumbly. Producer/directors over the years included Wayne Cameron, Judith Thomas, Lorraine Isaacs, Claire Henderson, Brian Stewart, John Wansbrough and Rex Simpson.

A show with a similar concept called How's Life? aired on TVNZ in 2002 and ran for two years, with Charlotte Dawson as host.

== See also ==
- Leave it to the Girls – 1957 series with similar format, and which also occasionally featured Eric Baume.
- Outnumbered – American series with similar format
