= Women at the Top =

- Genre: Talk show
- Based on: Men at the Top
- Presented by: Peter MacGregor
- Country of origin: Australia
- Original language: English

Production
- Running time: 30 minutes

Original release
- Network: ABC Television
- Release: 1959

Women at the Top is an Australian television series which aired in 1959 on ABC in Sydney. It was an interview series hosted by Peter MacGregor, and featured interviews with women who were successful in their respective fields. Aired in a 30-minute time-slot, in black-and-white, it was a spin-off from Men at the Top. Both series were short-lived, however ABC series typically ran for shorter seasons than shows on commercial television.

== Episode status ==
An episode or two may be held as kinescope recordings by National Film and Sound Archive.
