= Cuckoo in the Nest =

1978 Australian TV sitcom

- Written by: Austin Steele
- Directed by: Ron Anderson
- Starring: Jeannie Little; Lorna Lesley; David Whitbread; Barry Creyton
- Country of origin: Australia
- Original language: English
- No. of episodes: 4

Production
- Producer: Austin Steele
- Running time: 30 mins

Original release
- Network: Seven Network
- Release: 22 December 1978 – 12 January 1979

Cuckoo in the Nest is a 1978 Australian television sitcom starring Jeannie Little.
