= Greenway Wing (Supreme Court of New South Wales) =

Heritage-listed courthouse in Sydney, Australia

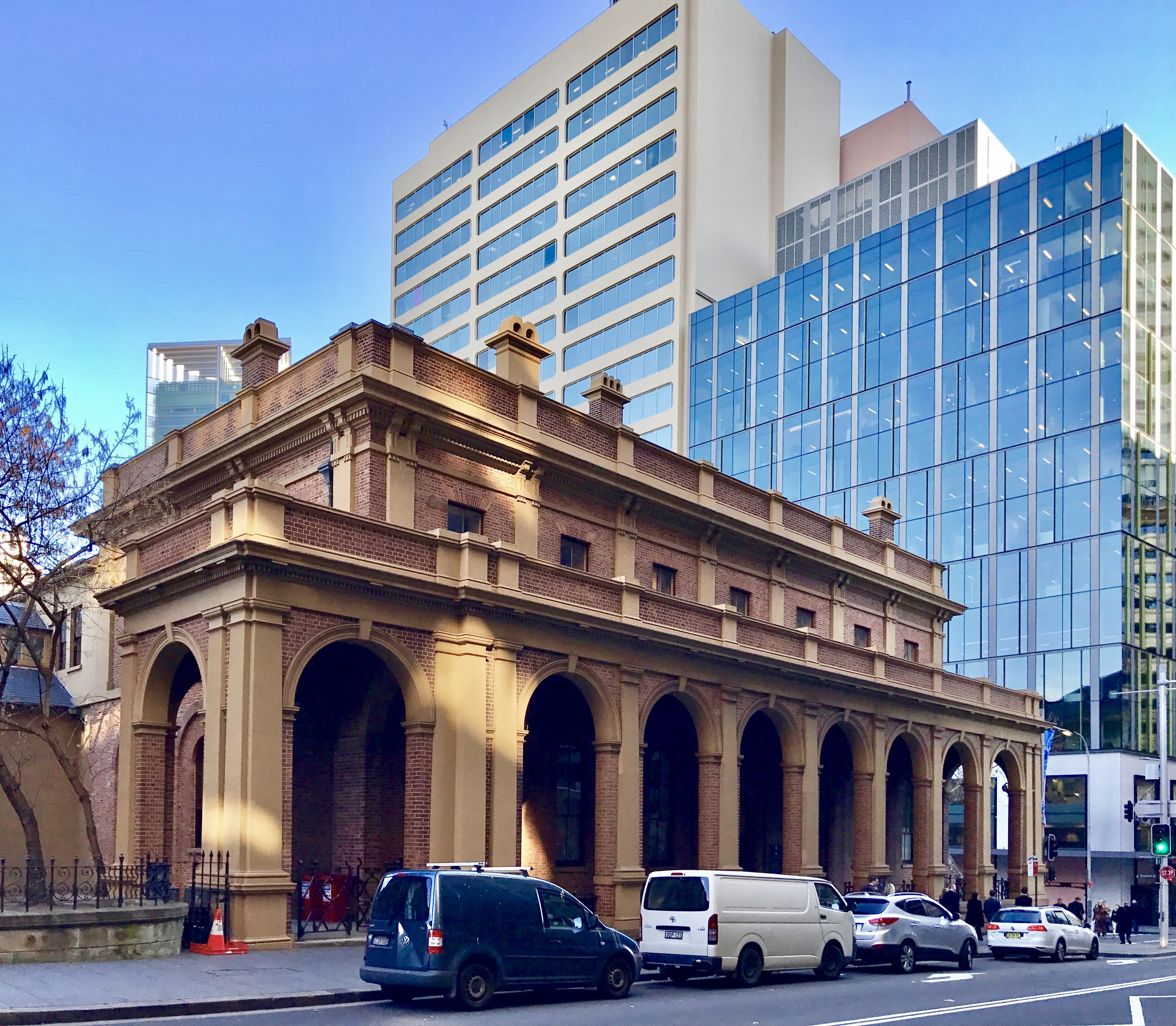
- Greenway Wing on King Street

- Location in the Sydney central business district Greenway Wing (Supreme Court of New South Wales) (Australia)
- 33°52′11″S 151°12′38″E
- Location: Corner of King and Elizabeth, Sydney, City of Sydney, New South Wales, Australia

History
- Built: 1820–1828

Site notes
- Architects: Francis Greenway; Standish Lawrence Harris; James Barnet
- Architectural styles: Old Colonial Georgian (Greenway designs); Victorian Italianate (Barnet additions)
- Owner: Department of Justice and Attorney General

New South Wales Heritage Register
- Official name: Sydney Supreme Court House (Old Court House); Old Court House
- Type: State heritage (built)
- Designated: 2 April 1999
- Reference no.: 800
- Type: Courthouse
- Category: Law Enforcement

The Greenway Wing of the Supreme Court of New South Wales is a heritage-listed courthouse located at the junction of King and Elizabeth Streets, in the central business district of Sydney, New South Wales, Australia. It was designed by Francis Greenway, Standish Lawrence Harris, and James Barnet and built from 1820 to 1828. It is also known as Sydney Supreme Court House (Old Court House) and Old Court House. The property is owned by the Department of Justice and Attorney General, departments of the Government of New South Wales. It was added to the New South Wales State Heritage Register on 2 April 1999.

== History ==
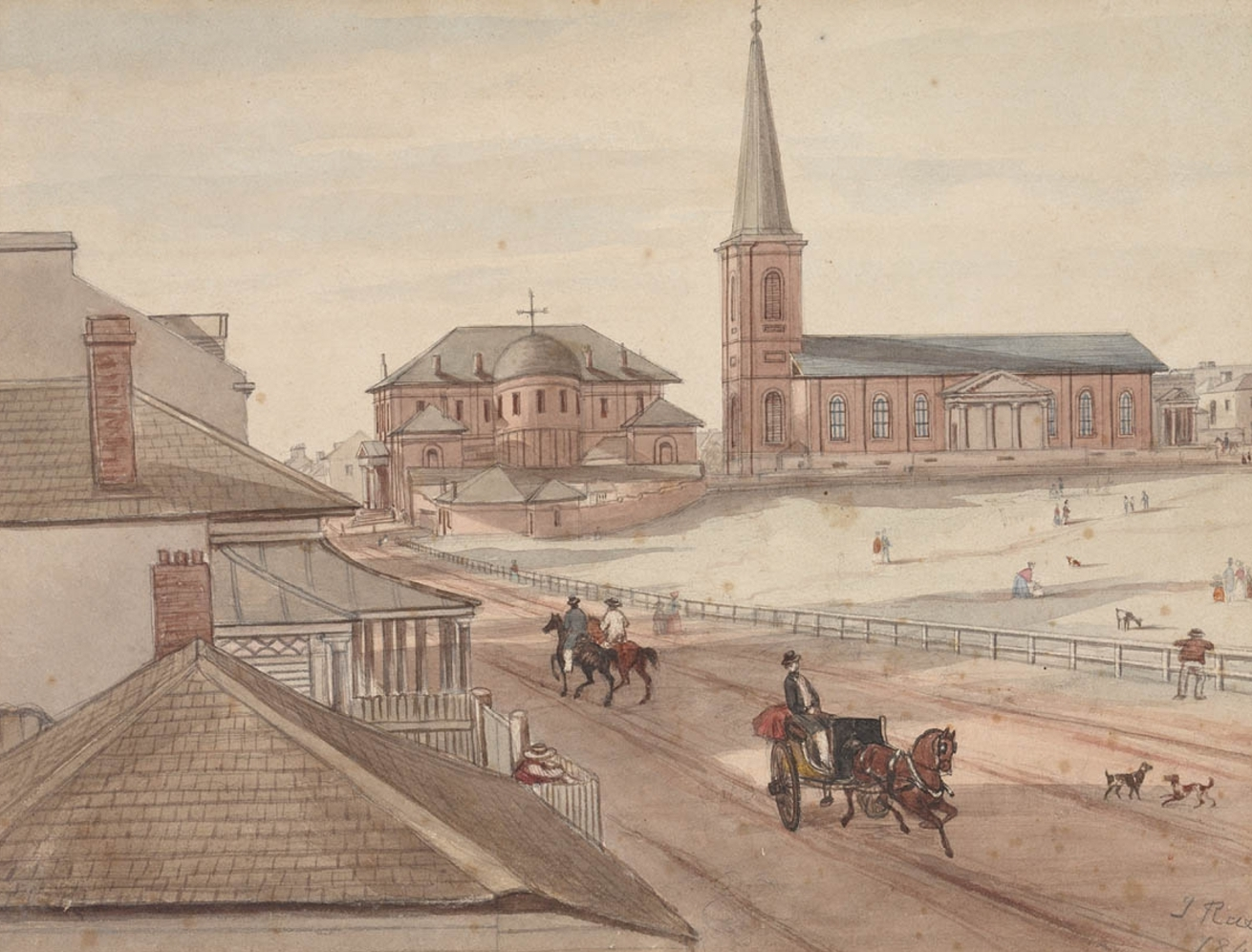
View north-east along Elizabeth Street of the Greenway/Harris-designed courthouse with St James' Church pictured right (John Rae, 1842).

The original Old Supreme Court House was designed by the colonial architect Francis Greenway under Governor Macquarie. Designed in 1819 and building began in 1820, Greenway was dismissed before the building was completed in 1828. The building was occupied by the Supreme Court in 1827. Additions were designed by Barnet in the 1860s. This building forms part of the centre axial group designed by Greenway with the Hyde Park Barracks and St James' Church that cover a historical period from 1801 to 1826, and 1851 to 1875.

== Description ==
The Old Supreme Court building is a two-storey rectangular building which consists of the original Georgian building with an additional loggia and cornice added in 1868 which gives the building a Victorian Italianate appearance evident in the arched colonnade and raised parapet concealing the roof. Original Greenway elements include windows, fine detail, recessed wall panels, arches, cedar joinery, staircase and cupola. This wing along with the Old Registry and Banco Rd Court from the Supreme Court Group. Other accommodation include Sheriffs office, legal rooms, judges chambers, library/conference rooms, chief executive offices, toilets. The Old Supreme Court is constructed in face sandstock brick with rendered moulded details and slate roofing. The exterior materials include brick and render, with slate roofing.

The building is in a good condition. Major additions designed by Barnet include the loggia, later timber additions.

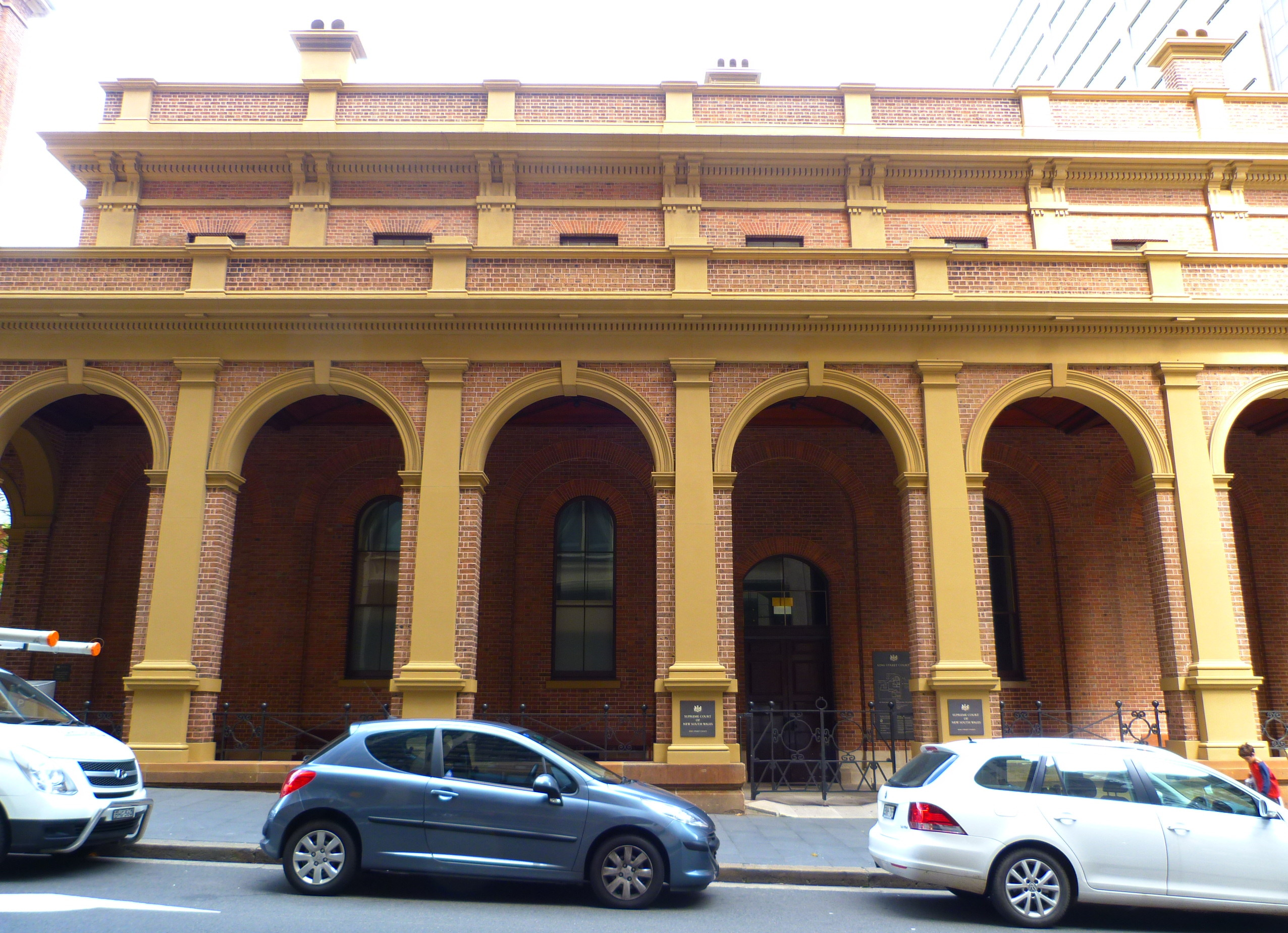
Close up of the building's arches

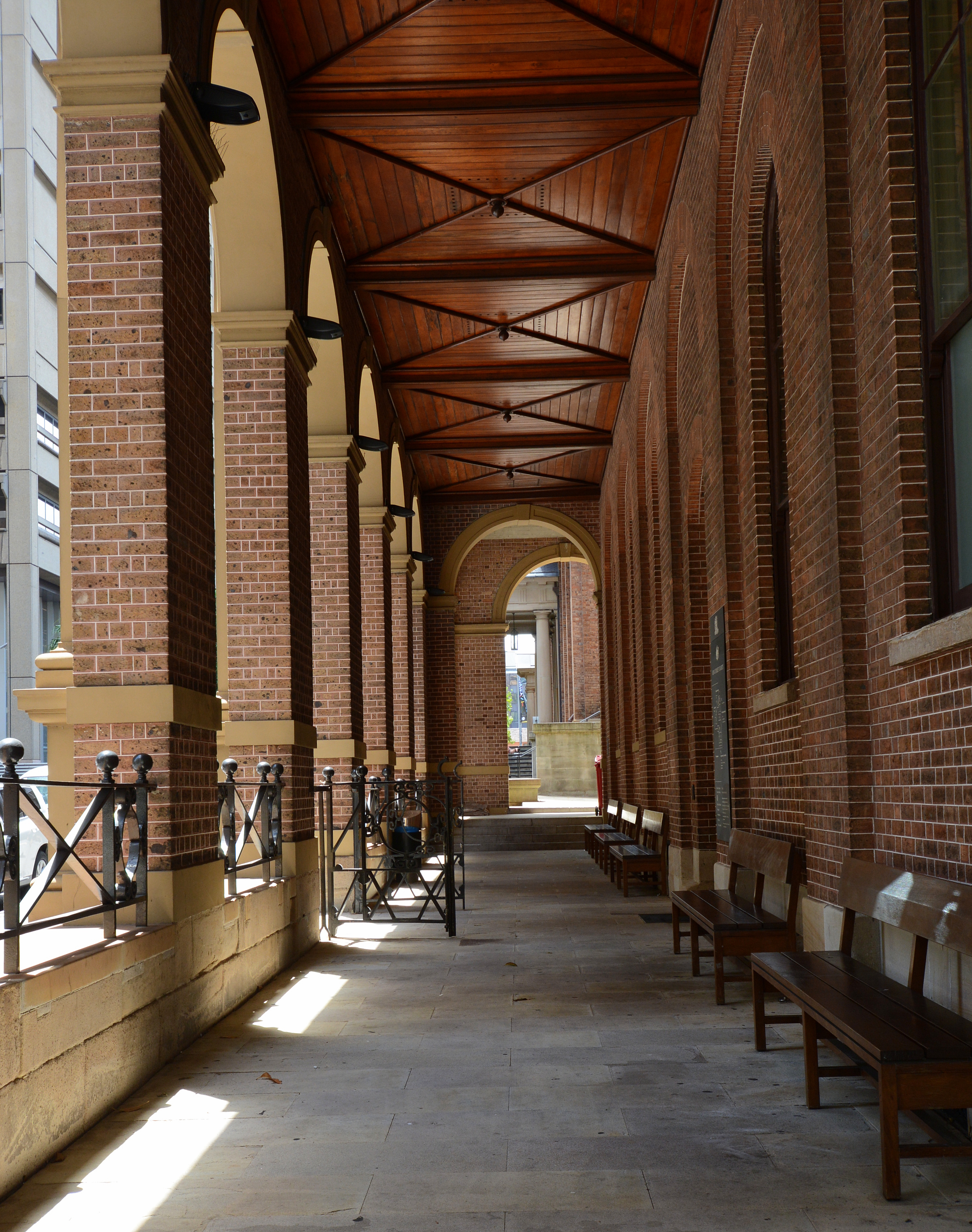
Exterior arches

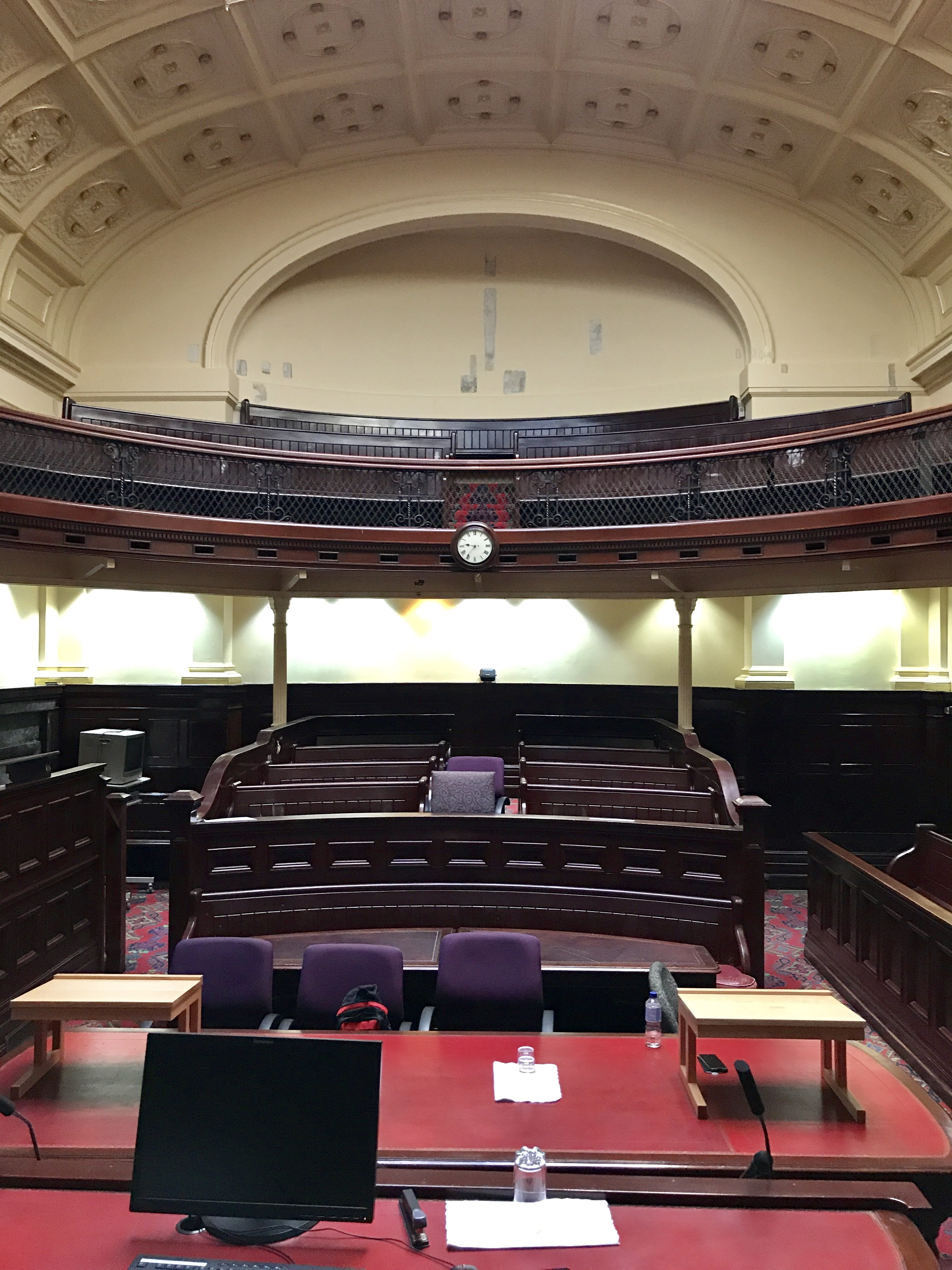
One of the numerous courtrooms

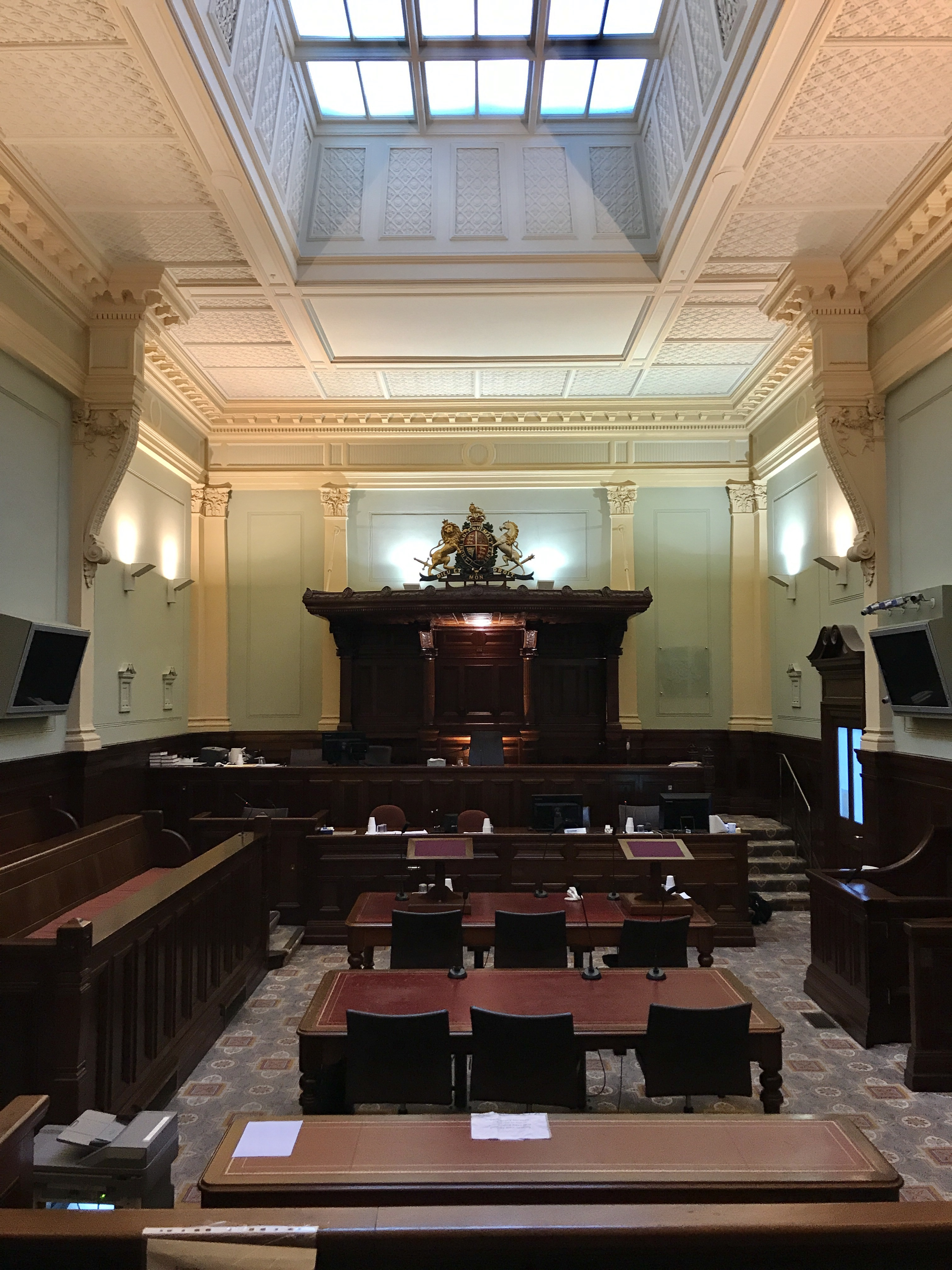
One of the numerous courtrooms

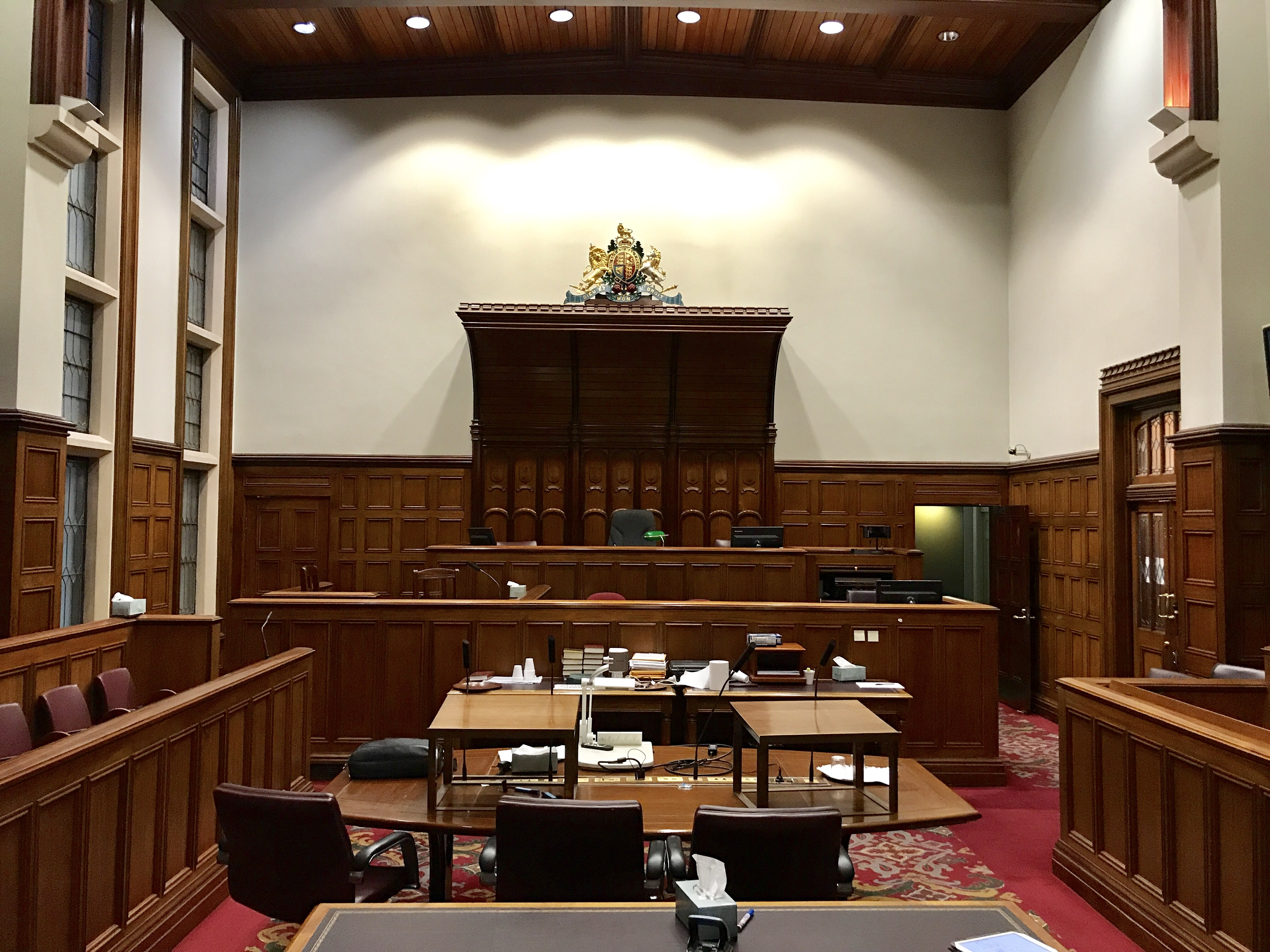
One of the numerous courtooms

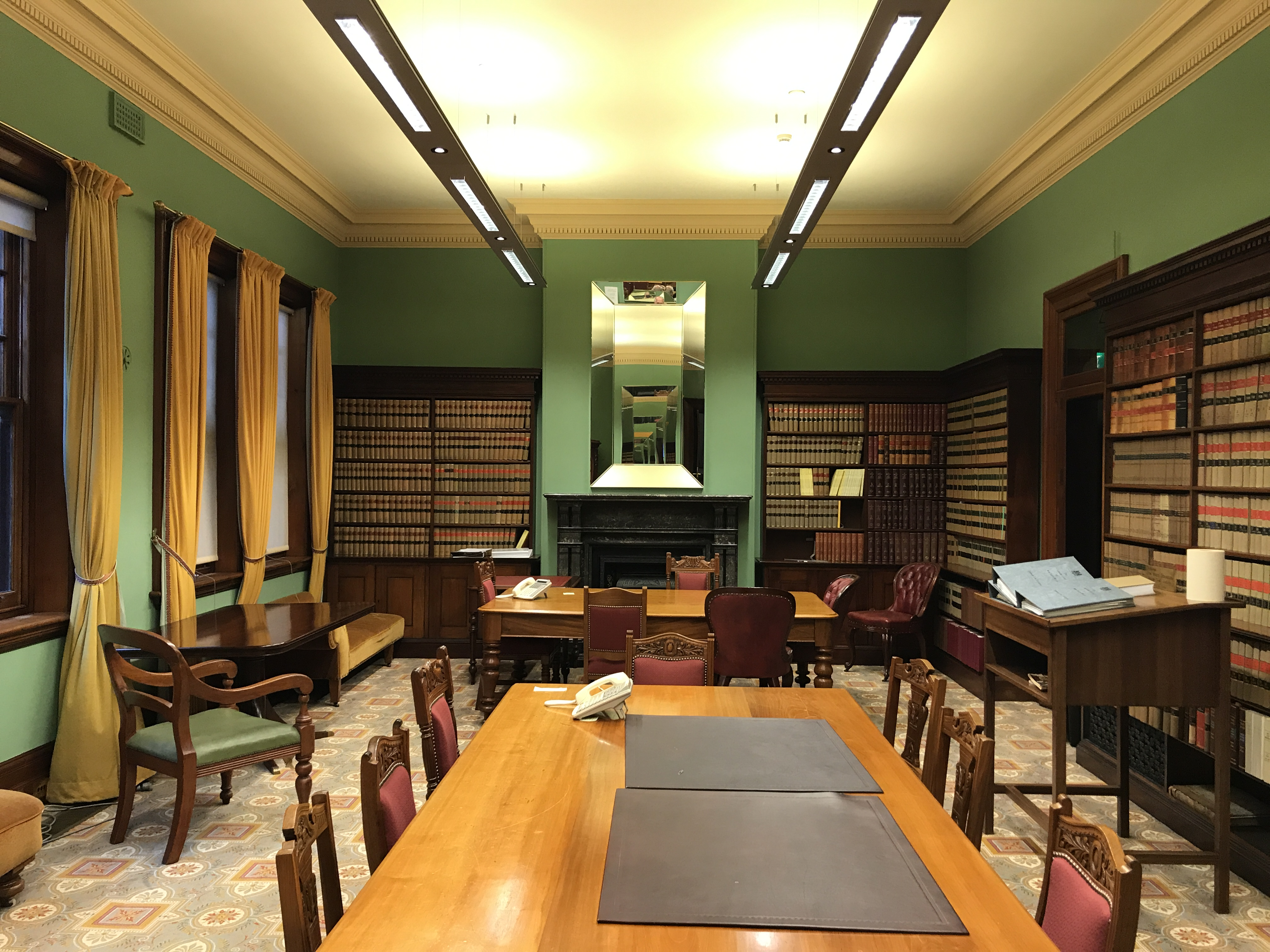
Library/conference room

== Heritage listing ==
As at 30 June 2011, the Greenway Wing Old Supreme Court building is located at the corner of Elizabeth and King Streets has historic significance as one of the three remaining Greenway designed buildings in the immediate area, the others are the Hyde Park Barracks and St James' Church. The building has aesthetic significance as a design of Australia's first trained architect, Francis Greenway, and as a fine rare and largely intact, if modified, example of the Old Colonial Georgian style as used in a judicial building. The building as historic and social significance as part of the early colonial legal system and as part of Macquarie's vision for Sydney. The site is significant as the location chosen for Macquarie's first Georgian public School which was apparently modified during construction to accommodate the Supreme Court. Representative of the style as used in a courthouse building and representative of the importance given to judicial buildings in the early days of the colony.

There are substantial later additions by James Barnet. It is prominently sited and forms a major part of the Court group in Queen's Square and part of the earliest civic group with the Hyde Park Barracks and St James' Church.

Sydney Supreme Court House was listed on the New South Wales State Heritage Register on 2 April 1999.

== See also ==
- Australian non-residential architectural styles
- Banco Road Court (Supreme Court of New South Wales)
- Old Registry Wing (Supreme Court of New South Wales)
