= Old Registry Wing (Supreme Court of New South Wales) =

Former registry office in the Supreme Court House group

Old Registry Office (Supreme Court of New South Wales)
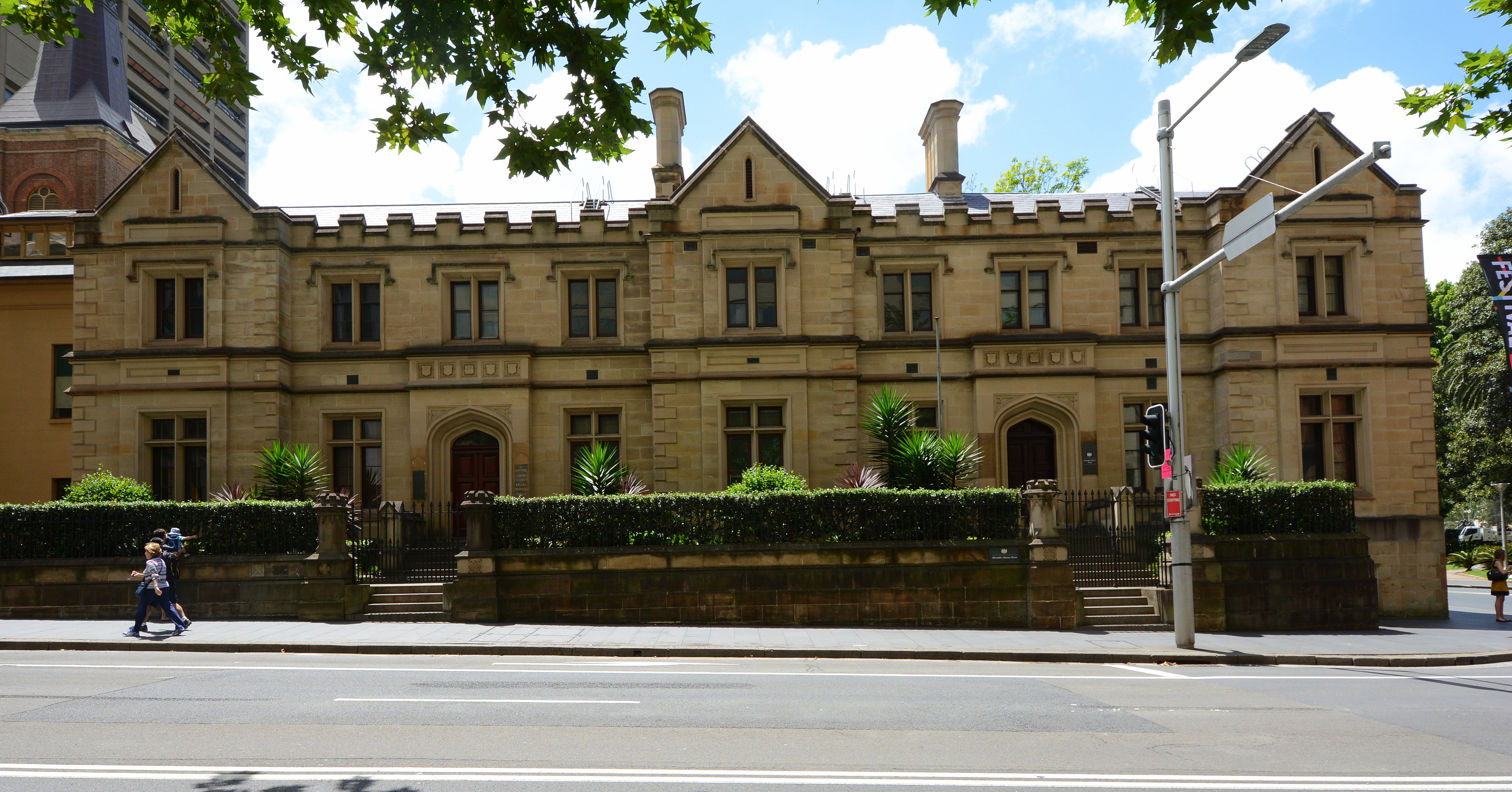
- The Old Registry building, the second structure to house the Court, completed in 1862, looking east across Elizabeth Street.

- Location within Sydney Location within Australia
- 33°52′10″S 151°12′38″E
- Location: Elizabeth Street and St James Road, Sydney central business district, City of Sydney, New South Wales, Australia

History
- Built: 1859–1862

Site notes
- Architects: Government Architect Alexander Dawson; James Barnet
- Architectural styles: Victorian Tudor; Victorian Free Gothic
- Owner: Department of Justice

New South Wales Heritage Register
- Official name: Old Registry Office, Sydney Supreme Court House; Sydney Supreme Court House
- Type: State heritage (built)
- Designated: 2 April 1999
- Reference no.: 801
- Type: Courthouse
- Category: Law Enforcement

The Old Registry Office of the Supreme Court of New South Wales is a heritage-listed courthouse at the corner of Elizabeth Street and St James Road, in the Sydney central business district in the City of Sydney local government area of New South Wales, Australia. It was designed by Government Architect Alexander Dawson and James Barnet and built from 1859 to 1862. It is also known as Sydney Supreme Court House. The property is owned by the Department of Justice, a department of the Government of New South Wales. It was added to the New South Wales State Heritage Register on 2 April 1999.

== History ==
This building which now forms part of the Supreme Court House was originally designed by the Colonial Architect Alexander Dawson in 1859 for use as a Registry Office. It was occupied in 1860 by the Registrar General.

Janes Barnet, the following Colonial Architect, designed two additions in 1875 and 1886 including a matching wing on the southeast corner. The building was completed from 1851 - 1875, and 1876 - 1900.

== Description ==
This building which now forms part of the Supreme Court House Group is symmetrically designed in the Victorian Tudor style. Typical stylistic features include banded chimneys, narrow grouped windows set under projecting gable bays, a castellated parapet at the roofline and quoin detailing. There were two later SE wing additions constructed in brick and staircase. The later wing is of lesser architectural merit though sympathetic in design. The original building is constructed in smooth dressed sandstone blocks with a slate hipped and gabled roof. The boundary iron palisade fence sits on a stone plinth.

=== Condition ===
As at 30 October 2000, the building was in a good condition. Modifications and additions were completed to the southeast wing in 1875 and 1886. World War II bomb shelters and twentieth-century additions were also made.

== Heritage listing ==
As at 18 September 2007, the Sydney Supreme Court House (Old Registry Office) located at the corner of Elizabeth Street and St James Road has historic significance as part of the Supreme Court complex. The building has aesthetic significance as a design of the Colonial Architect Alexander Dawson and is one of only two Government buildings which were designed in the Victorian Free Gothic style, the other is the Lands Titles Office in Prince Albert Road. Externally the Old Registry office is a fine, rare, largely intact, if modified, example of the style as used in a Government building. The building makes an important contribution to the character of the immediate area with its small scale and simple facade treatment. The building has historic and social significance as part of the Government administrative and legal systems. The site is significance as neighbouring macquarie's Civic Town Square with church and courthouse.

Old Registry Office, Sydney Supreme Court House was listed on the New South Wales State Heritage Register on 2 April 1999.

== See also ==
- Australian non-residential architectural styles
- Banco Road Court (Supreme Court of New South Wales)
- Greenway Wing (Supreme Court of New South Wales)
