= Milan Brych =

Czech-born fraudster

Milan Brych (born 11 December 1939) is a Czech-born quack and convicted fraudster known for his promotion of fraudulent treatments for cancer. He was removed from the New Zealand Medical Register in 1977 and in 1980 he was convicted of practising medicine without a licence in California, United States.

Brych fled the Soviet invasion of Czechoslovakia in 1968 and arrived in New Zealand as a refugee. Claiming to have medical professional qualifications, he commenced work as a medical practitioner. After being removed from the register of New Zealand medical practitioners in 1977, he then relocated his cancer treatment practice to the Cook Islands. One of his most high profile proponents in the 1970s was the then premier of Queensland Joh Bjelke-Petersen, who invited him to set up practice in Australia. Brych relocated to the United States, and in 1980 was convicted of practising medicine without a license. After serving part of his six-year sentence, he was deported.

== Early life ==
Milan Brych was born Vlastimil Brych on 11 December 1939 in Brno, Czechoslovakia. He was in prison twice during his youth and never graduated from high school. Brych claimed to have studied medicine at the Masaryk University in Brno. It was later revealed that at the time he claimed to have been studying, he was in fact in prison. After the 1968 Soviet invasion of Czechoslovakia (but not because of the invasion, it was just a coincidence), he fled to Italy with his girlfriend Marika. Then as a refugee he arrived in New Zealand.

== New Zealand ==
=== Employment history, deregistration and legal battle ===
Brych arrived in New Zealand in November 1968 after being accepted as a refugee. He initially found work as a laboratory technician at Auckland Hospital. After about a year, he successfully applied for a provisional medical licence on the basis that he held the equivalent of a medical degree and doctorate, claims which were subsequently found to be false. According to Myrek Cvigr, who acted as interpreter for Brych upon his arrival in New Zealand, Brych initially claimed to be a psychiatrist rather than an oncologist.

After completing an internship, Brych was hired by the radiotherapy department at Auckland Hospital on the basis that he had worked in oncology in Czechoslovakia. A later investigation found that his supervising consultants had found that he lacked knowledge in the fundamentals of medicine, but they had not raised concerns as they believed his qualifications had were not in doubt. By 1971, Brych had begun to treat patients with a series of injections which he claimed could induce remission of cancer. His claims received substantial media coverage and by late 1972 he had established a separate private practice and begun to treat overseas cancer patients from Australia and North America.

Medical authorities in New Zealand were immediately skeptical of Brych's claims, as he refused to provide details of his treatment methods on the basis they might be stolen by other doctors or by pharmaceutical companies. He also refused to provide patients' medical records to the Auckland Hospital Board and begun making claims that he was being prosecuted by the medical profession.

In April 1974, at the request of the Auckland Hospital Board, health minister Bob Tizard appointed a commission of enquiry into cancer services in Auckland, led by Australian physiologist Douglas Wright. Wright's report concluded that Brych had not developed any novel treatments for cancer. It also cast doubt on Brych's qualifications and criticised his "virtually complete absence of proper medical records".

Brych's contract at Auckland Hospital was terminated in response to Wright's findings, although he continue to treat patients privately. In November 1974, the Medical Council of New Zealand cancelled Brych's registration as a medical practitioner. He appealed his deregistration to the Supreme Court of New Zealand and was able to continue practising for over two years pending the outcome of his appeal. He eventually withdrew his appeal shortly before a hearing date was scheduled in early 1977, claiming that he was the victim of a conspiracy by the Communist authorities in Czechoslovakia which had destroyed evidence of his academic and professional record.

=== Purported cancer treatments ===
According to medical researcher John Scott, who played a key role in investigating Brych and documenting his methods, Brych's purported cancer treatments were little more than a naked fraud, involving the injection of commonly available drugs combined with psychological manipulation of his patients. At his eventual criminal trial in 1983, he admitted that he had charged as much as $9,600 for monthly injections of drugs that had cost him approximately $10 to obtain.

One of Brych's methods of "treating" cancer was based around laetrile, an extract from apricot kernels which has no medical benefit and may in fact lead to cyanide poisoning. On various occasions he falsely claimed to have isolated "specific antigens, and/or specific antibodies for individual patient's individual cancers", which no researchers had achieved.

Many of Brych's patients described being injected with a yellow solution, which Brych had identified as containing an immunoglobulin. However, an analysis of the remnants of an infusion given to one of his patients found that there was no immunoglobulin or other protein material present, but rather that it appeared to contain simply a vitamin B complex dietary supplement dissolved in water. Another analysis of a syringe Brych used in the Cook Islands, which was returned to New Zealand using a police-approved forensic chain of custody, found that it contained procaine, a local anaesthetic which can induce euphoria when administered intravenously.

In 1976, Brych attended a symposium on neuraminidase in West Germany, on the basis that he had made claims of incorporating neuraminidase into his "treatments". The symposium's organiser Hans Gerhard Schwick later swore an affidavit that Brych had not presented any papers nor participated in any discussions at the symposium, and had stated that he was unable to disclose his research as he was concerned about listening devices being planted by "gangsters organised from America who wished to steal his secret".

Brych had continued to use standard cancer treatments such as radiotherapy and chemotherapy while such resources were available to him, although he misrepresented these to patients as novel techniques. In one instance, Brych falsely diagnosed a man with blood cancer and prescribed incorrect and unnecessary doses of chemotherapy drugs, resulting in the patient developing bone marrow failure and requiring emergency medical treatment. In May 1977 another of Brych's patients died while returning to New Zealand from the Cook Islands.

=== Cook Islands ===
Brych left New Zealand after his appeal against his disbarment failed and moved his practice to Rarotonga in the Cook Islands in March 1977. His practice was supported by the Cook Islands' Health Minister Joe Williams, who arranged for medical supplies to be sent to him. In the leadup to the 1978 Cook Islands general election then-opposition leader Dr Tom Davis pledged that if elected he would not allow Brych to continue to practice. When Davis was elected Prime Minister he immediately barred Brych from Rarotonga hospital. His patients were sent home and he was ordered not to return to the islands.

Many patients from New Zealand and Australia died while taking treatment from Brych. The Nikao Cemetery, adjacent to the RSA (Returned Servicemen's Association) Cemetery in Rarotonga, contains the graves of 56 of Brych's patients. It is nicknamed "the Brych-yard".

=== Attempted move to Australia ===
| I was criticised in the same way for my support of cancer therapist Milan Brych... I was the only politician in Australia who said he ought to be given a chance to show his therapy worked. Like Stephen Horvath's car, his methods may yet be vindicated. |
Quote from Joh Bjelke-Petersen's autobiography, 1990

In May 1977, Australian federal health minister Ralph Hunt issued a public warning detailing Brych's previous deregistration in New Zealand and lack of any medical qualifications, advising Australians not to seek treatment from him. Hunt later publicly described Brych as a "charlatan" and stated that his patients would not receive any public funds for any "treatments" performed by Brych. In September 1977, backbench MP Jack Birney used parliamentary privilege to allege that Australian doctors were receiving kickbacks from Brych for referring their patients to his Cook Islands clinic.

Despite the federal government's opposition to Brych, in March 1978 Queensland premier Joh Bjelke-Petersen publicly invited Brych to set up a practice in Queensland, which he suggested could become a "world centre" for cancer treatment. Bjelke-Petersen described Brych as a "man of great skill and knowledge" and said he should be allowed to establish a self-financed clinic, subject to being registered by the Medical Board of Queensland. Queensland deputy premier Dr Llew Edwards, a general practitioner, was strenuously opposed to Brych being allowed to practise in Queensland and ultimately succeeded in convincing the state cabinet that Bjelke-Petersen's invitation should not be pursued, an unusual outcome at a time when Bjelke-Petersen was rarely opposed in cabinet.

== Convictions and disappearance ==
Brych relocated his practice to Los Angeles. In September 1980 he was arrested for conspiracy, fraud, and practising medicine without a licence. He was released after no charges were laid, but re-arrested in December. In June 1983 he was found guilty of 12 counts of malpractice and grand theft and in July 1983 he was sentenced to six years imprisonment. After serving three years of his sentence he was deported to New Zealand and then disappeared from popular and media attention. In the late nineties he was in Europe selling herbal products which were then banned in several European countries as they contained corticosteroids.

In the early 2000s he changed his name to John de Sepibus-Smith when he took on his wife's last name after their marriage. The couple had numerous companies in the United Kingdom though it is unclear what they did. According to a Television New Zealand documentary aired on 26 August 2012 he was living in London. In 2015, the Cook Island News reported that he was living in Switzerland under a different name.

An unnamed source from the Czech Republic recounted to a New Zealand journalist in 2022 being told that Brych had died from an aortic rupture between 2015 and 2018.

== See also ==
- Tom Neale
- Ernst T. Krebs
