= The Eternal Struggle =

1923 film by Reginald Barker

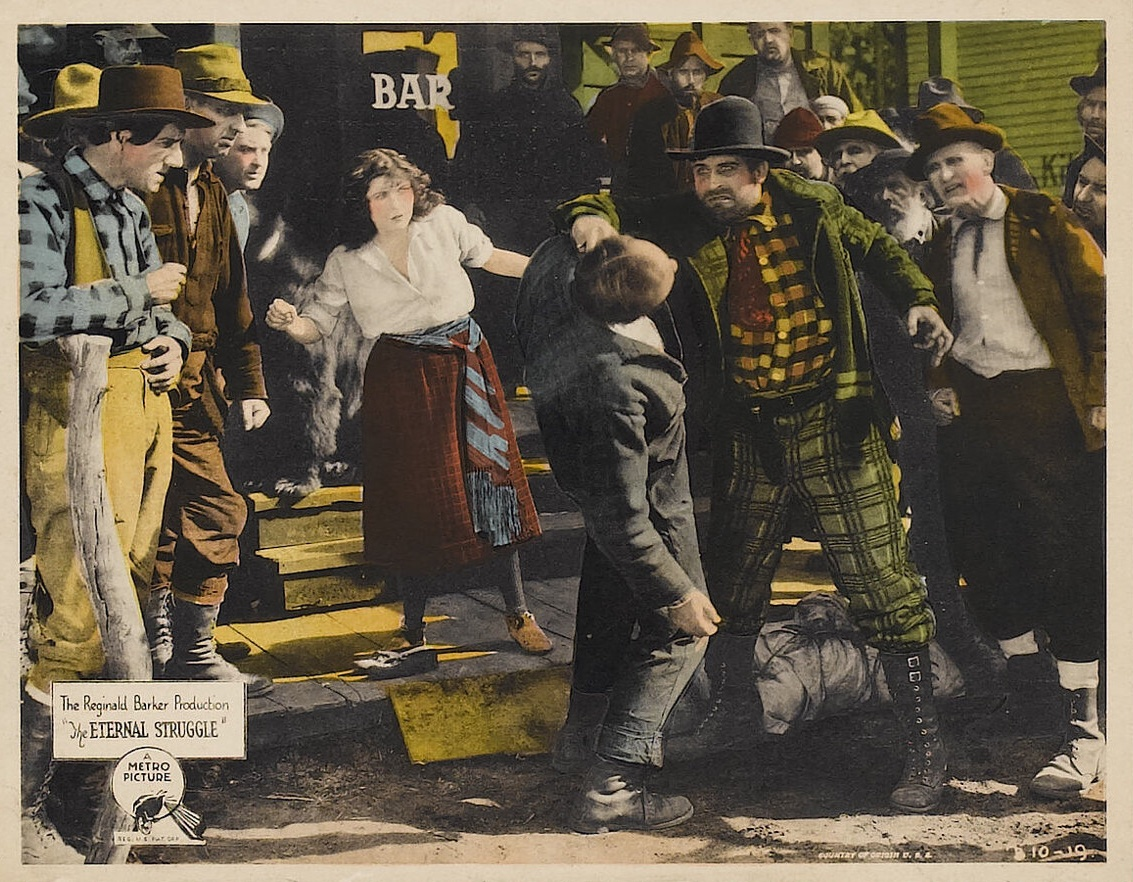
- Lobby card
- Directed by: Reginald Barker
- Written by: Monte M. Katterjohn; J.G. Hawks
- Based on: The Law-Bringers by Edith Joan Lyttleton
- Produced by: Louis B. Mayer
- Starring: Renée Adorée; Earle Williams; Barbara La Marr
- Cinematography: Percy Hilburn (*French)
- Edited by: Robert Kern
- Distributed by: Metro Pictures
- Release date: October 8, 1923
- Running time: 80 minutes
- Country: United States
- Language: Silent (English intertitles)

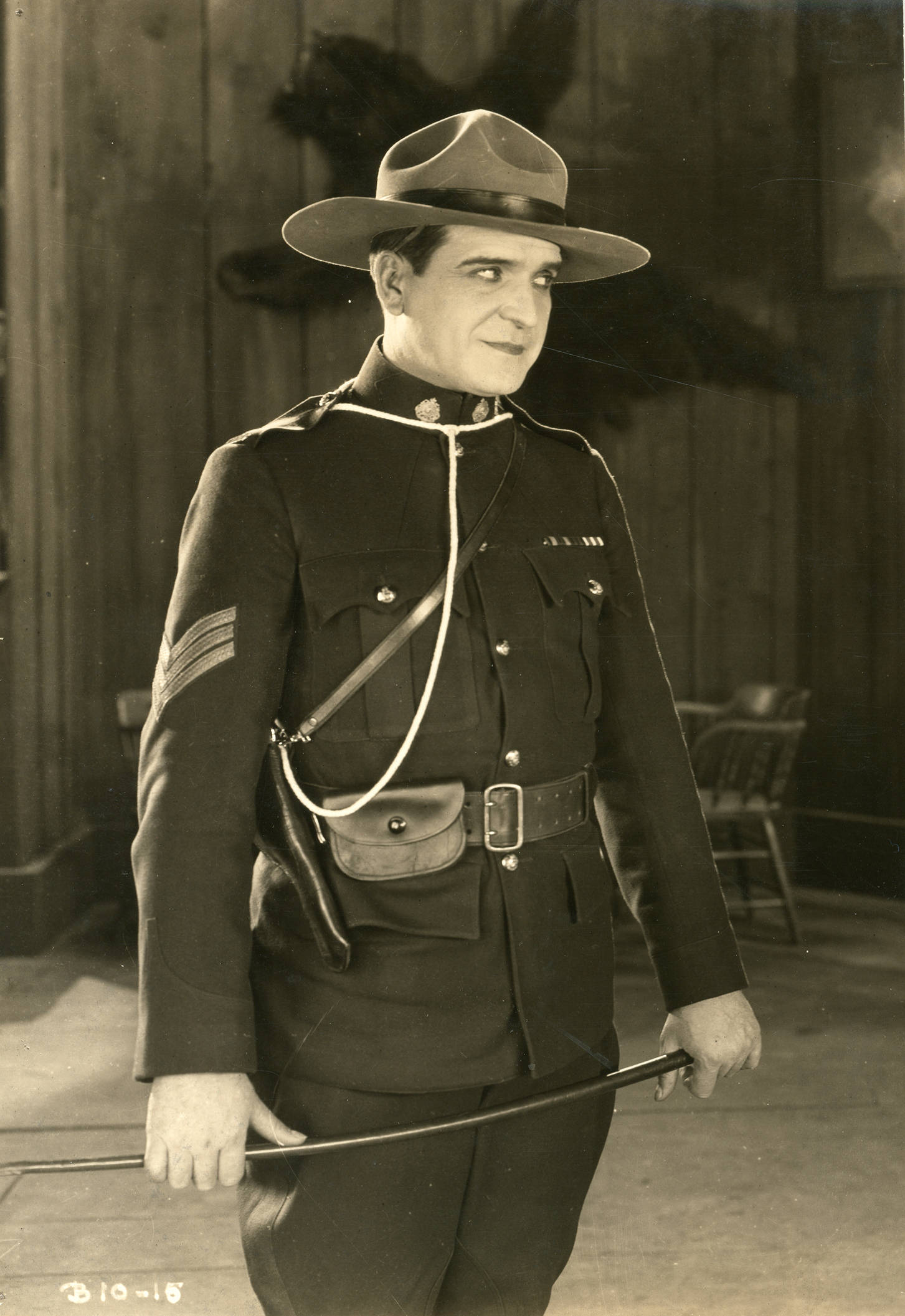
Earle Williams in the film

The Eternal Struggle is a 1923 American silent drama film directed by Reginald Barker. Distributed by Metro Pictures, the film is based on the 1913 novel The Law-Bringers, written by Edith Joan Lyttleton.

== Plot ==
The film focuses on Andrée Grange, the daughter of a local cafe owner. She is about to marry Neil Tempest, a sergeant at the North-West Mounted Police, but is actually in love with Bucky O'Hara, one of Tempest's underlings whom she is constantly flirting with. Meanwhile, her father is attacked in his cabin by Barode Dukane. Andrée, who has witnessed the struggle, feels that she is responsible for the following death of Barode. Her father helps her flee town by ship and O'Hara is assigned to locate and arrest her. He tracks her down, but is followed by Tempest. Tempest tries to help her, but they are caught in the rapids. O'Hara eventually comes to the rescue, saving Tempest and Andrée's lives. In the end, her innocence is proven and Tempest breaks the engagement, realizing that his fiancée is in love with O'Hara.

== Cast ==
- Renée Adorée as Andrée Grange
- Earle Williams as Sgt. Neil Tempest
- Barbara La Marr as Camille Lenoir
- Pat O'Malley as Bucky O'Hara
- Wallace Beery as Barode Dukane
- Josef Swickard as Pierre Grange
- Pat Harmon as Oily Kirby
- Anders Randolf as Capt. Jack Scott
- Ed Brady as Jean Caardeau
- Robert Anderson as Olaf Olafson
- George Kuwa as Wo Long

== Preservation status ==
Once thought to be a lost film, this film was one of ten silent films digitally preserved in the Russian film archive Gosfilmofond and presented to the Library of Congress in October 2010.
