= John Scott (medical researcher) =

New Zealand medical researcher (1931–2015)

Sir John Scott KBE FRSNZ
- Born: Philip John Scott; 26 June 1931; Auckland, New Zealand
- Died: 20 October 2015 (aged 84); Auckland, New Zealand
- Education: University of Otago; University of Birmingham
- Scientific career
- Fields: Medicine
- Workplaces: University of Otago; University of Auckland; Middlemore Hospital
- Thesis: Studies on serum β lipoproteins in health and disease (1962)
- Doctoral advisor: John Squire

Sir Philip John Scott KBE (26 June 1931 – 20 October 2015) was a New Zealand medical researcher and administrator.

== Early life and family ==
Scott was born in the Auckland suburb of Mount Eden in 1931, to Doris Annie (née Ruddock) and Horace McDonald Scott, but grew up in Palmerston North. He studied at Auckland University College for one year before spending five years at the University of Otago, from where he graduated BMedSc in 1953 and MB ChB in 1955.

== Medical career ==
After a period of hospital work in Auckland, as well as six months in general practice, Scott travelled to the United Kingdom. He spent nine months at the Postgraduate Medical School of London at Hammersmith Hospital, where he was awarded Membership of the Royal College of Physicians. He then undertook research in the Department of Experimental Pathology at the University of Birmingham, and graduated MD in 1962. His thesis was titled Studies on serum β lipoproteins in health and disease.

Scott returned to New Zealand and was appointed as a research fellow and then senior lecturer in the University of Otago's Auckland medical unit, but transferred to the University of Auckland medical school when the latter was established, and was head of the Department of Medicine at the University of Auckland from 1979 to 1987. He subsequently spent 10 years as head of the academic group at Middlemore Hospital.

His research between 1959 and the late 1970s focused on the metabolism of low-density lipoproteins and cholesterol, and arterial pathophysiology. More recently he was interested in diabetes and its complications.

In the mid-1970s, Scott played a key role in exposing Milan Brych, a medical quack who promoted false cancer treatments and was convicted of medical fraud. Scott was interviewed for the 2012 television documentary Cancerman: The Milan Brych Affair, where he was portrayed in reenactments by Aaron Jeffery.

Scott was a founding member of the Auckland Medical History Society and served as its president in 1976. He also served as president of the Royal Society of New Zealand from 1997 to 2000.

== Death ==
Scott died in Auckland on 20 October 2015 at the age of 84.

== Honours and awards ==
Scott was elected a Fellow of the Royal Society of New Zealand in 1987, and was appointed a Knight Commander of the Order of the British Empire, for services to medicine, in the 1988 New Year Honours. He is also a Fellow of the Royal College of Physicians and the Royal Australasian College of Physicians. Following his retirement from the University of Auckland in 1996, Scott was granted the title of professor emeritus.

Cultural offices
Preceded by Philippa Black	President of the Royal Society of New Zealand; 1997–2000	Succeeded by Gil Simpson
