= Eric Baume's Viewpoint =

- Also known as: Viewpoints
- Genre: Current affairs
- Presented by: Eric Baume
- Country of origin: Australia
- Original language: English

Original release
- Network: TCN-9
- Release: 13 May 1959 – 1961

Eric Baume's Viewpoint, also known simply as Viewpoint, is an Australian television program which aired from 1959 to 1961 on Sydney station TCN-9. Debuting on 13 May 1959, the program was a current affairs program broadcast on Wednesdays. The program included news, comment, and interviews with controversial radio and television personality Eric Baume.

== See also ==
- State Your Case
- This I Believe
