= Shona McFarlane =

New Zealand artist and writer (1929–2001)

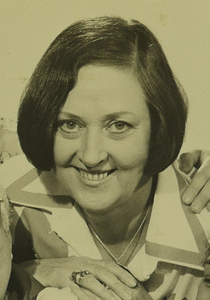
McFarlane in the 1970s as a panellist on Beauty and the Beast

Shona Graham McFarlane CBE (27 March 1929 – 29 September 2001) was a New Zealand artist, journalist and broadcaster.

== Biography ==
McFarlane was born in Gore and educated at Otago Girls' High School, and studied teaching at the Dunedin Teachers' College. McFarlane taught art in New Zealand schools from 1950 to 1952, before moving to London where she taught in the mid-1950s.

During the 1960s and 1970s she served on the Queen Elizabeth II Arts Council, and was president of the Otago Art Society during the 1960s. Until 1975, she served on the Otago Theatre Trust committee, on the Dunedin Public Art Gallery council, and was president of the Dunedin Civic Arts Council. She was also a prominent campaigner to preserve several historic Dunedin buildings.

As a journalist during the period from 1960 to 1974, McFarlane was women's editor of the Dunedin Star, one of the two major daily newspapers in that city.

McFarlane became a public figure as an original panellist of the long-running chat show Beauty and the Beast, appearing alongside Selwyn Toogood and Catherine Tizard from 1976 to 1985.

McFarlane survived breast cancer in the early 1970s, and became a prominent campaigner for more government funding for early detection of and intervention in the illness.

She was also vice president of the New Zealand Academy of Fine Arts for many years.

McFarlane wrote several books, and was widely commissioned throughout New Zealand for major art works. The Shona McFarlane Art Gallery in Dunedin was named after her, as well as the Shona McFarlane retirement village in Wellington.

McFarlane was married to National Arts Minister Allan Highet from 1976. Her sister is well-known artist Heather Francis.

McFarlane wrote six books, and her paintings appear primarily in museums, art galleries, and private collections.

== Honours and awards ==
- 1973 – Member of the Order of the British Empire for services to the arts, 1973 New Year Honours
- 1974 – National Bank Art Award
- 1994 – Commander of the Order of the British Empire, for services to the arts, 1994 New Year Honours
- 1994 – Governor General's Art Award, from New Zealand Academy of Fine Arts

== Books ==
- Dunedin, Portrait of a City (1970) ISBN 978-0-7233-0171-4
- Mixed Media (1975) ISBN 978-0-7233-0455-5
- Of Cabbages And Things (1981) ISBN 978-0-7233-0626-9
- From Maungaraki (1983) ISBN 978-0-7233-0707-5
- White Moas and Artichokes (1993) ISBN 978-0-908790-74-6
- Shona McFarlane: A Memoir (1999) ISBN 978-0-14-028481-2
