= Pageant (novel) =

Book by Edith Joan Lyttleton

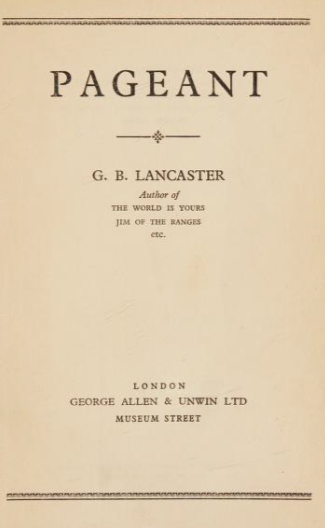
- Title page for Pageant (1933)
- Author: G. B. Lancaster
- Language: English
- Genre: historical novel
- Publisher: Century, USA
- Publication date: 1933
- Publication place: Australia
- Media type: Print
- Pages: 415
- Preceded by: The Savignys
- Followed by: The World is Yours

Pageant (1933) is a historical novel by Australasian author G. B. Lancaster (pen name for Edith Joan Lyttleton). It won the ALS Gold Medal for Best Novel in 1933.

== Plot summary ==
The novel follows the fortunes of three Tasmanian families from 1826 to the twentieth century.

== Notes ==
- Dedication: "To V.M. and Liz. In memory of billy-teas under the gum-trees and ghosts at Port Arthur."
- In the Foreword the author states "the greater part of the incident is true, having been collected from news paper files and records in Hobart and Launceston, and also from old diaries of my great-grandparents, who were among the military and settler class in the early days."

== Reviews ==
On the original publication of the novel a reviewer in Brisbane's The Telegraph placed the book in its literary context by stating: "In this book the influence of Marcus Clarke is apparent, and although the narrative is smoother, it is not less brilliant and fascinating." In a review of the first 6 winners of the ALS Gold Medal, "J.K.E." in The West Australian noted that "The characterisation is vivid and the writer has the power of making us feel the reality of her people." The reviewer for The Morning Post of London said: "Fine, virile, and graphic in style, spacious in atmosphere and treatment, this history of the early settlers and old convict days in Tasmania further gives us two of the most exquisite feminine portraits that I have seen in a novel for a long time."

By the 1990s, however, the view of the book had changed with The Oxford Companion to Australian Literature stating: "The novel's attempts to present Tasmanian history as a colourful pageant result in woodenness and contrived efforts, although some of the characters have vitality."

== Awards and nominations ==
- 1933 winner ALS Gold Medal
