= Wendy Scarfe =

Australian novelist, biographer and poet (born 1933)

Wendy Elizabeth Scarfe (born 21 November 1933) is an Australian novelist, biographer and poet.

== Biography ==
Born in Adelaide, South Australia, Scarfe gained qualifications from both the University of Melbourne and the Associated Teachers' Training College.

After living in England for some time, she moved, with husband, Allan Scarfe, to India.

She has taught in Australia, England and India and has published over 20 books including a number written or co-edited with her husband.

In retirement she completed a B.Litt. in Classical and Near Eastern Studies.

She is currently based in Warrnambool, Victoria.

== Bibliography ==
=== Poetry ===
- Shadow and Flowers (Writers Workshop, Calcutta, 1964)
- Shadow and Flowers 22nd enlarged edition (Nosukumo Publications, Melbourne, 1984)
- Dragonflies and Edges with Jeff Keith (Seaview Press, Adelaide, 2004)

=== Novels ===
- The Lotus Throne (Spectrum Pubs., Melbourne, 1976)
- Neither Here nor There (Kepler Pubs., Warrnambool, 1984)
- Laura: My Alter Ego (Spectrum Pubs., Melbourne, 1988)
- The Day They Shot Edward (Spectrum Pubs., Melbourne, 1991,1992)
- The Day They Shot Edward Revised edition (Seaview Press, Adelaide, 2003)
- Miranda (Seaview Press, Adelaide, 1988)
- Fishing for Strawberries (Seaview Press, Adelaide, 2001)
- Jerusha Braddon, Painter (Seaview Press, Adelaide, 2005)
- Hunger Town (Wakefield Press, 2014)

=== Books by Wendy Scarfe and Allan Scarfe (Joint authors) ===
- A Mouthful of Petals: The Story of an Indian Village (Heinemann, London, 1967)
- A Mouthful of Petals (Taplinger Pub., New York, 1967)
- A Mouthful of Petals (Gold Star Pubs, Melbourne, 1972)
- Tiger on a Rein: Report on the Bihar Famin (Geoffrey Chapman, London, 1969)
- People of India (Cassell Australia, Melbourne,1972)
- Victims or Bludgers? Case Studies in Poverty in Australia (Sorrett Pub., Melbourne, 1974)
- The Black Australians: Aboriginals: The Past and Future (Lloyd O'Neil, Melbourne, 1974)
- J.P.: His Biography (Orient Longman, New Delhi, 1975) Translated into Hindustani as Jayaprakash Ek Jivan (Orient Longman, New Delhi, 1978)
- Victims or Bludgers?: A Poverty Inquiry for Schools (Oxford University Press, Melbourne, 1981)
- Labor's Titan: The Story of Percy Brookfield, 1878-1921 (Edited with Gilbert Roper) (Warrnambool Institute Press, Warrnambool, 1983)
- All That Grief: Migrant Recollections of Greek Resistance to Fascism 1941-1949 (Hale & Iremonger, Sydney, 1994)
- J.P.: His Biography (Revised edition) (Orient Longman, New Delhi, 1997)
- Remembering Jayaprakash (Siddharth Pubs, New Delhi, 1997)
- No Taste for Carnage: Alex Sheppard: A Portrait, 1913-1997 (Seaview Press, Adelaide, 1998)

== Sources ==
- Bibliography of Australian Literature Project List of Australian Writers, National Centre for Australian Studies
- Bibliography of Australian Women's Literature 1795-1990, by Debra Adelaide
- Women Writers and Australia: A Bibliography of Fiction: 19th century to 1987, by Margaret C.Murphy, University of Melbourne Library
- The World Who's Who of Women, 1989
- The International Who's Who in Poetry, 2003
- Who's Who of Australian Writers, 1995
- The Writers Directory, Chicago/London, 1986–88
- Who's Who in Asia and the Pacific Nations, 1999, 2000
- International Authors and Writers Who's Who, Cambridge, 1998, 1999–2000, 2003, 2006, 2008
