= Harold Mercer =

Australian writer (1882–1952)

- Born: Harold Bailey; 1882; Kelvin Grove, Queensland
- Died: 13 June 1952 (aged 69–70); Bondi, New South Wales
- Occupations: short story writer and poet
- Writing career
- Language: English
- Years active: 1897-1952

Harold Mercer (1882–1952) was an Australian short story writer and poet who was born in Kelvin Grove in Queensland.

== Life ==
Mercer's birth name was "Harold Bailey" but this was changed to "Harold Mercer" after his parents' divorce when his mother reverted to her maiden name.

When young he was considered something of a chess prodigy and his name was given to the Harold Mercer Cup for Junior Chess Champion of Australia from 1949. At the time of his death he was publicity officer of the New South Wales Chess Association, having earlier served as its honorary secretary.

Mercer married in 1905 and worked as a clerk and then as an accountant in Sydney. He became involved in union affairs and helped found the Artists' and Writers' Union.

He enlisted in the First World War and served as a corporal in 1st Battalion with the AIF. He was wounded and invalided from France to London before returning to Australia.

After the war he worked as a publicity officer and sub-editor on the monthly Aussie. Throughout his adult life he continued to write prolifically.

Besides his own name Mercer also used the pseudonyms "Spare Corp", "Hamer", "Exdig", "Harold Hardupp", "Hamfat", "Percy Pawnticket", "The Frequent Lover" and others when publishing his work.

He died in Bondi in Sydney in a road accident after having dinner at his son's house.

== Bibliography ==
=== Novel ===
- Amazon Island (1933)

=== Collections ===
- The Search for the Bonzer Tart (1920), short stories
- The Frequent Lover : His Verses (1925), poetry
- The Lady Who Was French and Other Stories (1929), short stories
- The Adventures of Mrs Parsley (1942), short stories
- Romances in Real Life (1945), short stories
