= State Your Case =

- Genre: Talk show
- Presented by: Eric Baume
- Country of origin: Australia
- Original language: English

Original release
- Network: ATN-7
- Release: May 1957 – July 1957

State Your Case was an Australian television program which aired from May to July 1957 on Sydney station ATN-7.

Hosted by Eric Baume, the program aired live on Sundays. Baume would have a discussion with a different person in each episode. Former New South Wales Premier Jack Lang appeared as the guest on the 19 May 1957 episode.

Baume also had another program on ATN, titled This I Believe, which debuted 3 December 1956, and which out-lived State Your Case. From 1959 to 1961 he hosted Eric Baume's Viewpoint.
