= Edith Lyttleton (New Zealand writer) =

New Zealand author

Edith Joan Lyttleton
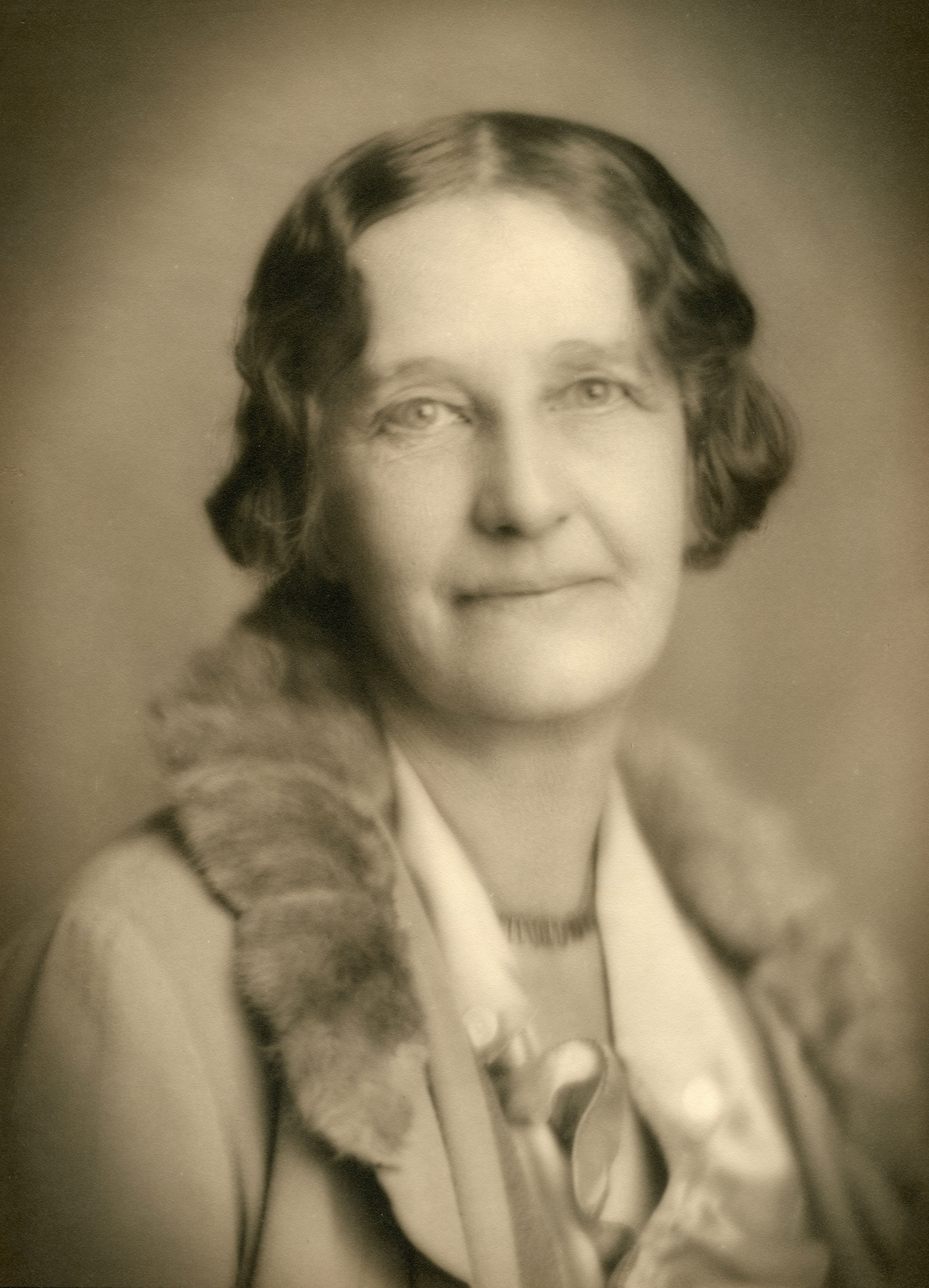
- Born: 18 December 1873; Epping, near Campbell Town, Tasmania
- Died: 10 March 1945 (aged 71); London, England
- Occupation: Writer
- Writing career
- Pen name: G. B. Lancaster

Edith Joan Lyttleton (18 December 1873 – 10 March 1945) was an Australasian author, who wrote as G. B. Lancaster.

== Life and career ==
Lyttleton was born on the family farm near Campbell Town, Tasmania, and brought up from 1879 in New Zealand on a sheep station at Rakaia in Canterbury. Between 1904 and 1943 she produced 13 novels, a collection of stories, two serialised novels and over 250 stories. She wrote initially under the name "Keron Hale", switching to "G B Lancaster" when her identity was revealed.

She was New Zealand's most widely read writer of the first half of the twentieth century. She wrote about the formation of colonial identity and the legacy of imperialism in the lives of settlers and their descendants. Her settings were Australia, Canada and New Zealand. She was influenced by Rudyard Kipling and R. L. Stevenson.

Her first success was with The Law-Bringers (1913), which was made into a Hollywood feature film in the 1920s (as was The Altar Stairs). Pageant (1933) topped the American best-seller list for six months. Other successes were Promenade (1938) and Grand Parade (1943).

Lyttleton left New Zealand in 1909 for America, before settling in England. She died in a nursing home in London on 10 March 1945.

== Awards and recognition ==
Lyttleton was awarded the Australian Literary Society Gold Medal for an outstanding literary work in the previous calendar year, for Pageant in 1933.

Lyttleton Crescent, a street in the Canberra suburb of Cook, is named in her honour.

== Novels ==
- Sons O' Man (1904)
- The Spur to Smite (1905)
- The Tracks We Tread (1907)
- The Altar Stairs (1907)
- Jim of the Ranges (1910)
- The Honorable Peggy (1911)
- The Law-Bringers (1913)
- Food Divine (1917)
- The Savignys (1918)
- Pageant (1933)
- The World is Yours (1933)
- Promenade (1938)
- Grand Parade (1943)

== Film adaptations ==
- Rider of the Law (1919) - original screenplay with H. Tipton Steck
- The Altar Stairs (1922) - based on her novel of the same name
- The Eternal Struggle (1923) - based on her novel The Law-Bringers
- The Little Irish Girl (1926) - based on her story "The Grifters"
- Bred in Old Kentucky (1926) - original screenplay with Louis Weadock
