= Banco Court (Supreme Court of New South Wales) =

Banco Court (Supreme Court of NSW)
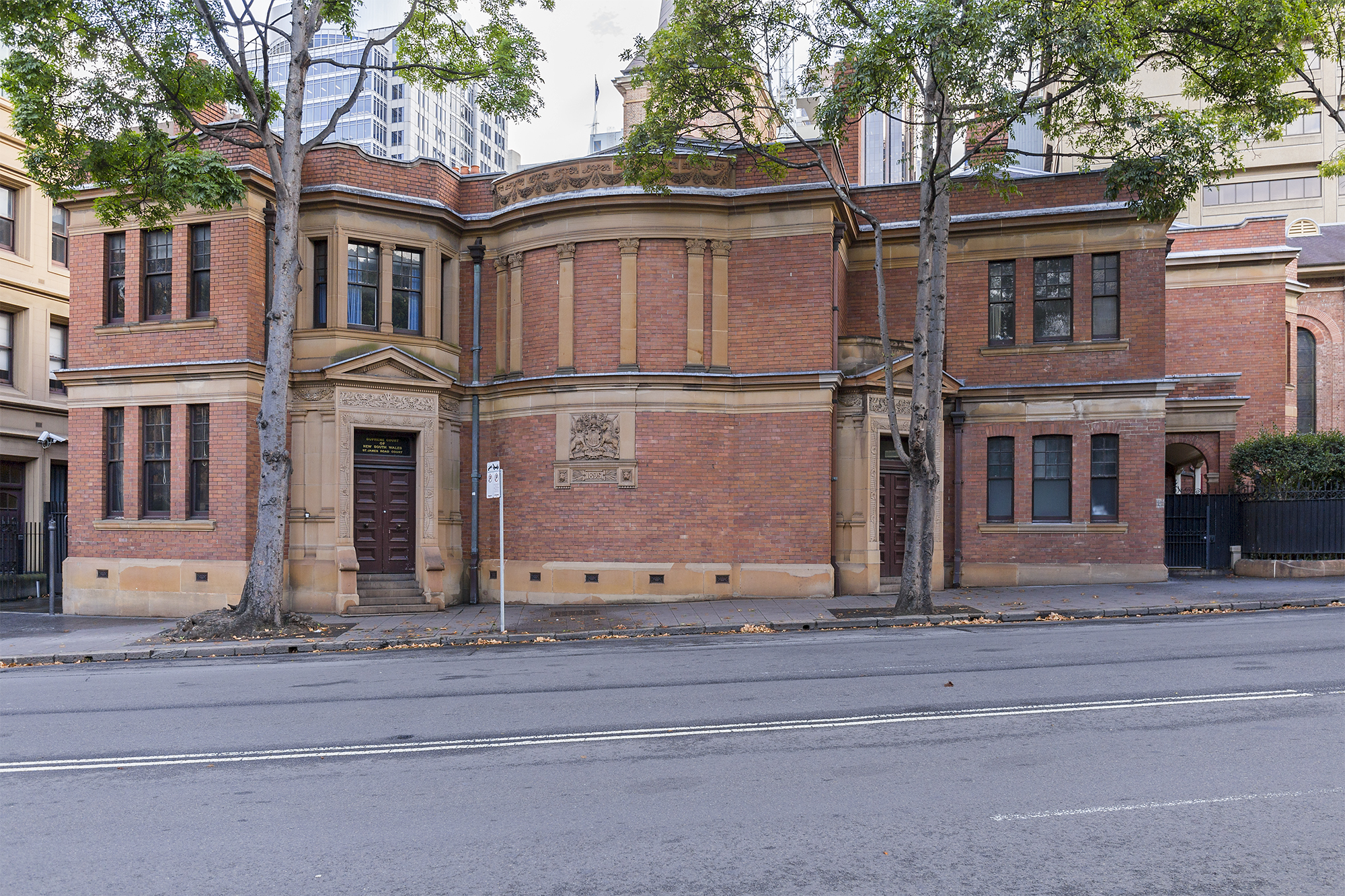
- Pictured in March 2019

- Location within Sydney Location within Australia
- 33°52′11″S 151°12′40″E
- Location: St James Road, Sydney, Australia

History
- Built: 1895–1896

Site notes
- Architect: Walter Liberty Vernon
- Architectural style: Federation Free Classical
- Owner: Department of Justice

New South Wales Heritage Register
- Official name: Banco Court, Sydney Supreme Court House; Sydney Supreme Court House (Banco Court); St James Law Courts; King Street Courts
- Type: State heritage (built)
- Designated: 2 April 1999
- Reference no.: 799
- Type: Courthouse
- Category: Law Enforcement

The former Banco Court of the Supreme Court of New South Wales is a heritage-listed courthouse at St James Road, Sydney, Australia. It was designed by Walter Liberty Vernon and built from 1895 to 1896. It forms part of the historic complex known sometimes as the "St James Law Courts" or the "King Street Courts". The property is owned by the Department of Justice, a department of the Government of New South Wales. It was added to the New South Wales State Heritage Register on 2 April 1999.

The historic Banco Court building is not the current Banco Court (i.e. the large courtroom where the judges of the court can sit in banco) of the Supreme Court of New South Wales. Since the construction of the Law Courts Building on Queen's Square nearby, the Banco Court has been located on level 13 of that building. The modern Banco Court is used for full court sittings, as well as ceremonies.

== History ==
The Banco Court building facing St James Road was the last building to be constructed on the island site formed by Elizabeth Street, St James Road, Queen's Square and King Street. It was designed by the Government Architect W. L. Vernon and built in 1895–96. The four main buildings on the site: St James Church and the old Court House (now called the Greenway Wing) facing King Street, the old Registry Office facing Elizabeth Street, and the Banco Court, together form an ensemble that preserves its external fabric from the end of the 19th century. The three historic court buildings within this ensemble is sometimes called the "King Street Courts" or the "Supreme Court House" group. The building was designed to house a larger court room which can accommodate all the justices of the Supreme Court sitting as one panel, or in banco, for large hearings as well as ceremonies. The building also includes chambers for judges, offices, and rooms for barristers, witnesses and the jury when attending court. A small garden lies to the side, overlooked by the chambers of the Chief Justice, designed to evoke the courtyard gardens of the Inns of Court.

The modern, high-rise Supreme Court building, located on the other side of Queen's Square, was completed in 1977. The Banco Court room moved to level 13 of the new building. The King Street Courts were used for a time by the District Court of New South Wales, until 1994, but are now used again by the Supreme Court. The building was awarded the 2004 Energy Australia National Trust Heritage Award.

== Description ==
The Banco Court is a Federation Free Classical building with Baroque influenced decoration evident in the intricate sandstone carving around the window and building entrances. Interiors feature intact elaborate plasterwork and cedar joinery. This building relates well in design and siting to the neighbouring St James' Church. The Banco Court is constructed in face red brick which has contrasting sandstone detailing and trim. Interior materials include cedar joinery and plasterwork.

The building is in good condition.

== Heritage listing ==
As at 11 January 2001, the Sydney Supreme Court building (Banco Court) located at the rear of the Old Registry building facing St James Road has historic significance as part of the Supreme Court complex. The building has aesthetic significance as a fine and largely intact example of an early twentieth-century building in the Federation Free Style, and as the only courthouse in the city constructed in this style. The building makes an important contribution to the character of the immediate area, and with its small town scale blends well with the older buildings in the complex. The building has historic and social significance as part of the site. The site is significant as the location chosen for Macquarie's first Georgian Public School which was modified during construction to accommodate the first New South Wales Supreme Court building. Representative of the style as used in a courthouse building and the quality of the interior detailing is representative of the importance given to judicial buildings at the turn of the century.

The Banco Court, Sydney Supreme Court House was listed on the New South Wales State Heritage Register on 2 April 1999.

== See also ==
- Australian non-residential architectural styles
- Federation architecture
- Greenway Wing (Supreme Court of New South Wales)
- Old Registry Wing (Supreme Court of New South Wales)
