= Amazon Island =

1933 sf novel by Harold Mercer

- Author: Harold Mercer
- Language: English
- Genre: Lost world fantasy
- Publisher: NSW Bookstall Company
- Publication date: 1933
- Publication place: Australia
- Media type: Print
- Pages: 178

Amazon Island (1933) is a lost world fantasy novel by Australian author Harold Mercer. It was originally published in Australia by the NSW Bookstall Company.

This was Mercer's first and only novel.

== Plot summary ==
Determined to follow a set of clues about a hidden Pacific Island, Captain Darnell, of the yacht Seaflower, assembles a crew of treasure-seekers. When they reach the island they discover that it is ruled by a race of women.

== Critical reception ==
A reviewer in The Bulletin called the novel "an engrossing adventure yarn", where the author's "narrative faculty and imaginative gifts are seen at their best in this unusual novel."

In The Weekly Times a reviewer stated that "There is a not a dull line in the book".

== Publication history ==
After the novel's initial publication by NSW Bookstall Company in 1933 it was reprinted as follows:

- 1938, The Land, periodical, serialised in 17 weekly instalments from 18 February 1938
- 2021, Roy Glashan's Library, epub edition based on the 1938 serialisation

== Note ==
The full text of the novel is available via an Austlit pdf.
