= This I Believe (TV program) =

- Genre: News/Current affairs
- Presented by: Eric Baume
- Country of origin: Australia
- Original language: English

Production
- Running time: 15 minutes; 11 minutes (some episodes)

Original release
- Network: ATN-7
- Release: 3 December 1956 – July 1958

This I Believe is an early Australian television program. Broadcast 5 nights a week on Sydney station ATN-7, it debuted 3 December 1956 (on ATN's second day of programming). It was a 15-minute program in which Eric Baume would provide a commentary on current world events. At the end of each TV program he would say "This I believe". The program ended around July 1958. According to television listings in the Sydney Morning Herald, the last few episodes of the program aired in an 11-minute time-slot.

This I Believe was also a radio program with Baume, which debuted before the television series.

An episode of this program is held by the National Film and Sound Archive and has been digitised.

== See also ==
- State Your Case – weekly (on Sundays) television program with Eric Baume from 1957
- Eric Baume's Viewpoint – 1959–1961 television program with Baume
