= Eric Baume =

New Zealand-Australian journalist, novelist, radio presenter, actor and talk show host

Eric Baume OBE
- Born: Frederick Ehrenfried Baume; 29 May 1900; Auckland, New Zealand
- Died: 24 April 1967 (aged 66); Sydney, New South Wales, Australia
- Occupations: Journalist; novelist; radio presenter; actor; TV talk show host
- Known for: Beauty and the Beast (TV series)
- Family: Frederick Baume (father), Rosetta Baume (mother), Michael Baume (nephew)

Eric Ehrenfried Baume OBE (29 May 1900 – 24 April 1967) was a New Zealand-born Australian based journalist, novelist, radio presenter, actor and television talk show host.

== Early life ==
Eric Baume was born Frederick Ehrenfried Baume in Auckland, New Zealand in 1900. His father, of the same name, was a lawyer and politician; his mother, Rosetta Baume, was a teacher and community worker, and one of the first women to stand for Parliament in New Zealand. Eric moved to Sydney in the early 1920s and worked for as editor for several papers. At this time he developed what was to become a lifelong addiction to gambling, which kept his family in debt for decades.

== Career ==
Baume wrote thirteen books, mostly novels, including Half Caste (1933). Film rights were purchased in 1946 by United Artists.

He hosted a radio series titled This I Believe. A television version aired on ATN-7 from 3 December 1956 to circa 27 July 1958.

He also hosted a short-lived show on ATN-7 on Sundays titled State Your Case during 1957.

In 1959 he hosted Men at the Top, and then began hosting Eric Baume's Viewpoint (1959–1961).

He is well remembered as "The Beast" in the Australian TV talk show Beauty and the Beast, where his gruff style compared to the ladies on the panel kept the ratings high.

== Honour ==
In 1966 he was appointed an Officer of the Order of the British Empire (OBE).

== Death ==
Baume died in 1967. His debts considerably exceeded his assets.

== Personal life ==
He was the uncle of Michael Baume and was also related to Peter Baume, both Liberal politicians and ministers.

His brother Sydney E. Baume was an executive with the Macquarie Broadcasting Network.
