= Stan Zemanek =

Australian radio broadcaster & TV presenter (1947-2007)

- Born: 29 May 1947; Sydney, New South Wales, Australia
- Died: 12 July 2007 (aged 60); North Sydney, New South Wales, Australia
- Occupations: radio presenter; television presenter; radio producer; author
- Years active: 1978−2007
- Known for: 2UE, Beauty and the Beast
- Spouse: Marcella Zemanek
- Children: 2

Stan Zemanek (29 May 1947 – 12 July 2007) was an Australian shock jock, radio broadcaster, television presenter, radio producer and author who presented a night-time show on 2UE in Sydney and which was networked across parts of Australia via Southern Cross.

== Career ==
Zemanek was born and raised in Sydney, New South Wales, but began working in radio as a researcher for Radio C-Fun 141 in Vancouver, British Columbia, Canada. He worked as a producer on the John Laws program in Australia starting in 1978, before returning to North America for some years, where he covered the 1983 America's Cup. He spent a decade presenting on 2UE late at night beginning in 1987. He spent a year in 2000 presenting the 2GB morning shift. Zemanek moved to Melbourne for a short stint with 3AW's drive program in 2002 before moving back to Sydney and 2UE in 2003, having failed to garner ratings, and publicly falling out with several members of the 3AW's broadcast team.

While popular with much of his audience, Stan often boasted about being the most complained-about broadcaster in the country, polarising opinions of those who did not agree with his right-wing beliefs. He was not shy to admit that he was politically biased and often criticised "idiot Labor voters" for not doing the same. His most commonly used terms were "numb nuts", "turn it up", "half-wit", "oxygen thief", "left-wing looney", "give yourself an uppercut" and "typical Labor voter"; and he once asked a caller who sounded to be a little slow 'are you smoking the wacky-tobacky', a slang reference to marijuana.

In 2003, following his return to 2UE, he received a bombardment of calls from a number of people he referred to as 'The Phone Box Boys', thinking they were all calling him from a phone box. The calls would sometimes reach 20 a night, and would spin several staples of Zemanek such as sound effects, on Stan himself. This led to an enormous spike in his ratings for the period of March–July 2003.

Zemanek had an ongoing rivalry with fellow 2UE colleague and breakfast host Mike Carlton, ever since Carlton revealed on-air that Zemanek was about to move to 2GB. An angry Zemanek called for Carlton to be sacked and for the Australian Broadcasting Authority to investigate him for "irresponsible journalism". The "debate" between the two broadcasters degenerated over the next few days, with Carlton calling Zemanek "a little shit", "a village idiot", and "a stunted runt" and Zemanek calling Carlton "a turd" and "a ponce" with "his head up his backside". After Zemanek's death, Carlton stated on his breakfast show at 2UE that he hated Zemanek and would only attend his funeral to check that he was really dead, causing 2UE management to publicly denounce Carlton. Carlton made his comment while showbiz reporter Peter Ford was doing a report on Zemanek's funeral. At the time Ford made light of Carlton's comments. On reflection, however, he was disgusted and blasted Carlton on 2UE that day. Ford explained that Zemanek was a mentor and friend and that he was disgusted with what Carlton had said. Ford resigned from his spot on Carlton's program (but continues to report for other 2UE programs).

== Personal life ==
Stan and his wife, Marcella Zemanek, had had two daughters, Gaby and Melissa, and two grandchildren at the time of his death. He supported the Manly Warringah Sea Eagles in the NRL, before moving to Melbourne (where Australian rules football is the dominant football code), where he elected to support the Carlton Football Club.

== Ill health, retirement and death ==
Zemanek was diagnosed with glioblastoma multiforme, an aggressive brain tumour that is almost universally fatal within a few years, in May 2006. Treatment included chemotherapy and radiotherapy in addition to surgery performed by Charles Teo. After rumours in 2006, Zemanek's retirement, and intention to look after his health and spend time with his family, was announced on 9 December 2006. His final show went to air on 22 December 2006. Many in the commercial radio industry paid tribute to Zemanek on-air, including his former on-air colleagues and, later, rivals (on 2GB), Alan Jones and Ray Hadley.

While Zemanek intended to return to Beauty and the Beast in early 2007, and he celebrated his 60th birthday with former Beauty and the Beast co-stars, his health deteriorated in retirement. In June 2007, he and his wife cut short a planned holiday due to illness, and in early July 2007 his family announced that he was dying. He died in his sleep in the early hours on 12 July 2007. His funeral, open to the public, was held on 17 July 2007, at St. Mary's Catholic Church in North Sydney, and was followed by a private cremation.
