= Keegan (surname) =

Keegan is an Anglicisation of the Irish clan name Mac Aodhagáin. The name means "son (or descendant) of Aodhagán" (a diminutive of the Irish name Aodh, meaning "fire" or "fiery"). It is found in counties Wicklow, Dublin, Leitrim and Roscommon.

== Notable people with the surname "Keegan" include ==
=== A ===
- Andrew Keegan (born 1979), American actor

=== B ===
- Betty Ann Keegan (1920–1974), American politician
- Bob Keegan (baseball) (1920–2001), American baseball player
- Bob Keegan (actor) (1924–1988), British actor
- Brendan Keegan, American business executive

=== C ===
- Chad Keegan (born 1979), South African cricketer
- Claire Keegan (born 1968), Irish writer

=== D ===
- Denis Keegan (1924–1993), British judge
- Desmond Keegan, Irish academic
- Dominic Keegan (born 2000), American baseball player
- Donal Keegan (born 1938), Northern Irish physician

=== E ===
- Earl Keegan Jr. (1921–1977), American politician
- Ed Keegan (1939–2014), American baseball player
- Eileen Keegan (??–2000), South African ballet dancer

=== G ===
- Ged Keegan (born 1955), English footballer
- George Keegan (1928–2008), Australian politician
- Gerry Keegan (born 1994), Irish hurler
- Gillian Keegan (born 1968), British politician

=== H ===
- Harry Keegan (born 1952), Irish Gaelic footballer
- Harry A. Keegan (1882–1968), American politician

=== J ===
- Jake Keegan (born 1991), American soccer player
- James Keegan (1869–??), Irish sportsperson
- Jimmy Keegan (born 1969), American drummer
- Joe Keegan (disambiguation), multiple people
- John Keegan (disambiguation), multiple people
- Jordan Keegan (born 1992), Irish footballer
- Joseph M. Keegan (1922–2007), American politician
- Josephine Keegan (born 1935), Scottish composer
- Julie Keegan (born 1964), Australian lawn bowler

=== K ===
- Kashy Keegan (born 1983), British singer-songwriter
- Kevin Keegan (1951–2026), English footballer
- Kevin Keegan (musician) (1924–1978), Irish musician
- Kourtney Keegan (born 1994), American tennis player

=== L ===
- Lee Keegan (born 1989), Irish Gaelic footballer
- Lisa Graham Keegan (born 1959), American activist

=== M ===
- Marina Keegan (1989–2012), American author
- Mary Keegan (born 1953), British civil servant
- Matt Keegan (born 1976), American artist
- Michelle Keegan (born 1987), English actress
- Mickey Keegan (born 1986), American professional wrestler

=== O ===
- Olivia Rose Keegan (born 1999), American actress

=== P ===
- Paul Keegan (disambiguation), multiple people
- Philip Keegan (1942–1988), American politician

=== R ===
- Ray Keegan (1923–2004), Australian rules footballer
- Rita Keegan (born 1949), American artist
- Rose Keegan (born 1971), British actress
- Rupert Keegan (1955–2024), English racing driver

=== S ===
- Seán Keegan (1930–2007), Irish politician
- Shane Keegan (born 1981), Irish football manager
- Siobhan Keegan, Northern Irish judge

=== T ===
- Te Taka Keegan, New Zealand academic
- Ted Keegan (born 1961), American actor
- Tim Keegan, English singer-songwriter
- Tom Keegan (born 1959), American sportswriter
- Tom Keegan (politician) (1878–1937), Australian politician
- Trent Keegan (1974–2008), New Zealand photojournalist
- Trevor Keegan (born 2000), American football player

=== V ===
- Victor Keegan (born 1940), British journalist

=== W ===
- William Keegan (born 1938), British journalist

== See also ==
- Keegan (given name), people with the given name "Keegan"
- Senator Keegan, a list of Senators with the surname "Keegan"
