= Marilyn Pryor =

New Zealand anti-abortion activist

Marilyn Valeria Pryor DSG
- Born: Marilyn Valeria Lobb; 10 August 1936; Wellington, New Zealand
- Died: 15 March 2005 (aged 68); Paremata, New Zealand
- Burial place: Whenua Tapu Cemetery, Pukerua Bay
- Known for: First Māori DSG; anti-abortion activism
- Spouse: Geoffrey David Pryor
- Children: 4
- Relatives: John Howell (great-great-great-grandfather); Ulva Belsham (first cousin once removed); Martha Bragg (second cousin once removed); Norman Gilroy (third cousin once removed); Selwyn Toogood (half-second cousin twice removed); Peter Arnett (fourth cousin once removed)

Marilyn Valeria Pryor, DSG (née Lobb; 10 August 1936 – 15 March 2005) was a New Zealand conservative Catholic, and anti-abortion advocate who served on the Executive Council of Voice for Life, and served administrative roles for New Zealand's Thomas Stafford Williams. Since the 1990s she worked on, and in her latter years was the editor of, Wellington's Diocese Catholic Newspaper - WelCom. She held an admiration for Cardinal Joseph Bernadin.

Pryor was of Ngāi Tahu descent and became New Zealand's first Māori Papal Dame of the Order of St. Gregory the Great in 1996. She died of motor neurone disease in 2005.

== Early life (1936–1975) ==
Marilyn Lobb was born in Vivian Street, Wellington in 1936 to her Australian father and European-Māori mother. Through her maternal grandmother's mother Mary Joss, she was a great-great-granddaughter of William and Sarah Cameron, daughter of John Howell and his first wife Kohikohi, a young Kāti Māmoe princess of Raratoka Island. Her maternal grandfather was a grandson of Patrick Gilroy.

Lobb went to work after finishing high school, working at Berger Paints, and the Soil Bureau, while finishing her University Entrance at night school. She attended first year chemistry classes at Victoria University of Wellington where she also served as a lab assistant, as well as an assistant dental technician to the New Zealand Medical Research Council. In 1958 she married Geoffrey Pryor and left full-time waged employment.

== Anti-abortion advocate (1975–2005) ==
Marilyn Pryor was a devoted conservative Catholic and strongly supported her church's opposition to abortion in New Zealand. She served on the National Executive Council of the Society for Protection of the Unborn Child (SPUC) - later renamed Voice for Life (1975–1982), and served as that organisation's National President (1978–1981). Even after she relinquished those roles, she worked ceaselessly to prevent the increased prevalence of abortion in New Zealand, though Abortion Supervisory Committee figures showed a steady increase. In 1984, she authored an official history of the early days of the debate over abortion in New Zealand, The Right to Live (1985). She also founded an anti-abortion pregnancy support service, Pregnancy Help, at the same time. Many of her criticisms of abortion were self-published, and are preserved at the National Library of New Zealand in Wellington.

Mrs Pryor also authored criticisms of New Zealand's ratification of the United Nations Convention on the Elimination of All Forms of Discrimination Against Women (CEDAW) in 1984, as well as criticisms of New Zealand abortion law twenty years after passage of the Contraception Sterilisation and Abortion Act in its final form in 1978, as well as an account of abortion policy in the Netherlands in 2001.

== Party Affiliation ==
Although Mrs Pryor began her political career as a conservative New Zealand Labour Party supporter, due to the anti-abortion views of the late Prime Minister Norman Kirk in the early seventies, she resigned when his successor, Bill Rowling, stated that he would hold a referendum on the abortion issue if Labour won the 1978 New Zealand General Election, which it did not. She subsequently joined the New Zealand National Party instead, and lost nomination for its Kapiti electorate to Roger Sowry in 1987, who later served as a Cabinet Minister under the administrations of Jim Bolger and Jenny Shipley in the nineties. Although her Māori affiliation with her iwi was not strong, she did serve on National's Māori Council, and convinced Jim Bolger to make stronger commitment to Māori issues related to the legal status of the Treaty of Waitangi.

== Catholic Administrative and Pastoral Roles ==
In the nineties, Mrs Pryor increasingly turned her attention to Catholic church administrative responsibilities. She was made a Papal Dame of the Pontifical Equestrian Order of St. Gregory the Great in 1996, and helped to establish an administrative pastoral office for Cardinal Thomas Stafford Williams in Wellington, at the same time that she continued her anti-abortion activities.

== Death ==
In 2004, Mrs Pryor contracted motor neurone disease, which swiftly took hold. She died on 15 March 2005, aged 68, at her home in Paremata. She was buried three days later in Whenua Tapu Cemetery in Pukerua Bay, Porirua with her husband who had died three years later. She is survived by three of her four children. Today her book The Right to Live forms much of the historical content of a New Zealand anti-abortion information website, run by the New Zealand Life Charitable Trust.

== Bibliography ==
- Marilyn Pryor: The Right to Live: The Abortion Battle of New Zealand: Auckland: Haelen Books: 1985: ISBN 0-908630-23-9
- Marilyn Pryor (ed): Beyond Price: Collected Thoughts on Respect for the Value of Human Life: Wellington: SPUC: 1979.
- Marilyn Pryor: The Radical Feminist Agenda is Overturned: Auckland: Women for Life: 1984.
- Marilyn Pryor: A Funny Thing Happened- An Alternative Report on the 1984 Women's Forums: Paramata: M.Pryor: 1985.
- Marilyn Pryor: Your Slip is Showing: A Critique of Induced Abortion in New Zealand 1976-1983: A Report Prepared for the Abortion Supervisory Committee by Janet Sceats: Paremata: M.Pryor: 1986.
- Marilyn Pryor: Abortion Aftermath: Paremata: M.Pryor: 1987.
- Marilyn Pryor (ed): Abortion Revisited: A Review of New Zealand's Abortion Laws on the Twentieth Anniversary of the Contraception, Sterilisation and Abortion Act: Wellington: SPUC: 1998.
- Marilyn Pryor: Abortion in the Netherlands: Why Holland has the Lowest Abortion Rate in the Western World: Wellington: M.Pryor: 2001.
