= Ngāi Tahu =

Māori iwi (tribe) of the South Island, New Zealand

- Iwi (tribe) in Māoridom
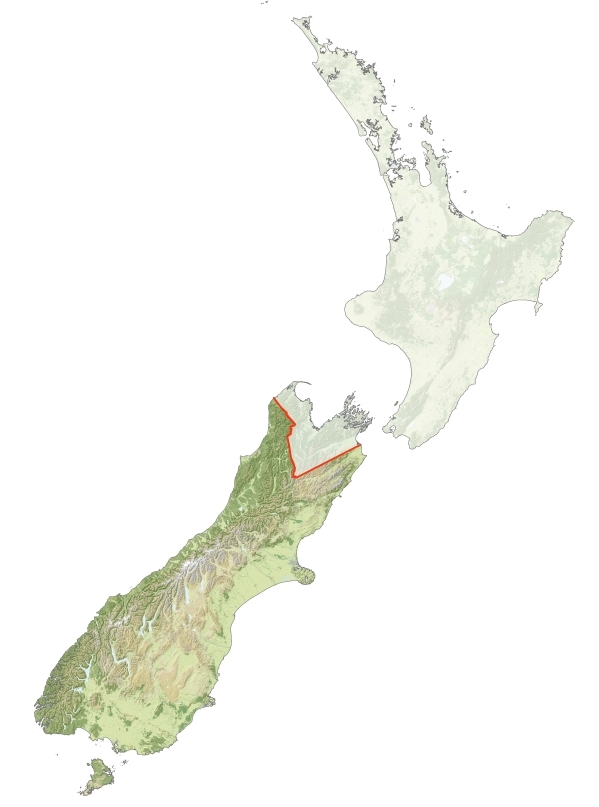
- Traditional rohe
- Rohe (region): South Island
- Waka (canoe): Tākitimu
- Population: 84,969 (2023 census)
- Website: ngaitahu.iwi.nz

Ngāi Tahu, or Kāi Tahu, is the principal Māori iwi (tribe) of the South Island. Its takiwā (tribal area) is the largest in New Zealand, and extends from the White Bluffs / Te Parinui o Whiti (southeast of Blenheim), Mount Māhanga and Kahurangi Point in the north to Stewart Island / Rakiura in the south. The takiwā comprises 18 rūnanga (governance areas) corresponding to traditional settlements. According to the 2023 census, there were 84,969 people affiliated with the Kāi Tahu iwi.

Ngāi Tahu originated in the Gisborne District of the North Island, along with Ngāti Porou and Ngāti Kahungunu, who all intermarried amongst the local Ngāti Ira. Over time, all but Ngāti Porou would migrate away from the district. Several iwi were already occupying the South Island prior to Ngāi Tahu's arrival, with Kāti Māmoe only having arrived about a century earlier from the Hastings District, and already having conquered Waitaha, who themselves were a collection of ancient groups. Other iwi that Ngāi Tahu encountered while migrating through the South Island were Ngāi Tara, Rangitāne, Ngāti Tūmatakōkiri, and Ngāti Wairangi – all of which also migrated from the North Island at varying times. During the 19th century, hundreds of thousands of Europeans – mostly British – migrated to New Zealand. After European arrival, Ngāti Toa (allied with Ngāti Tama) and Ngāti Rārua invaded Ngāi Tahu's territory with muskets. Some European settlers intermingled with native iwi populations, and today, most families who descend from Ngāi Tahu also have Ngāti Māmoe and British ancestry.

Ngāi Tahu translates as "People of Tahu", referencing the name of the ancestor Tahupōtiki. Alongside the other iwi that Ngāi Tahu absorbed, there are five primary hapū (sub-tribes) of Ngāi Tahu, which are: Ngāti Kurī, Ngāti Irakehu, Kāti Huirapa, Ngāi Tūāhuriri, and Ngāi Te Ruahikihiki. A branch of Ngāi Tūāhuriri and Ngāti Kurī, Kāi Te Rakiāmoa, was one of the latest hapū which the leading chiefs descended from.

== History ==
=== Traditional origins ===
Ngāi Tahu trace their traditional descent from Tahupōtiki (also Te Tuhi-māreikura-o-Oho-a-tama-wahine), and Tahumatua), the younger brother of Porourangi. The brothers are said to be descended from Paikea as grandsons, great-grandsons, or great-great-grandsons. Either way, Paikea himself is always Chief Uenuku's son. Some groups may even trace the brothers as great-grandsons of Uenuku's other son Ruatapu as well as with Paikea.

Whatever the case, Tahupōtiki was born in Whāngārā (a place associated with Paikea), around 1450CE. He was given command of the Tākitimu waka (canoe), and took it down to the South Island where he landed at the Arahura River on the West Coast – or at the Waiau River near Manapōuri. He stayed there for a time before travelling back to Whāngārā in a new canoe upon learning of the death of his brother. As according to ancient protocol, he took Porourangi's grieving wife Hamo-te-rangi as his own, by whom he had at least four sons: Ira-a-Tahu, Ira-(apa)-roa, Tahumuri-hape, and Karimoe. Some say his other sons were Ira-manawa-piko, Rakaroa, Rakahurumanu, Tūroto, Tahutīoro, and Ruanuku.

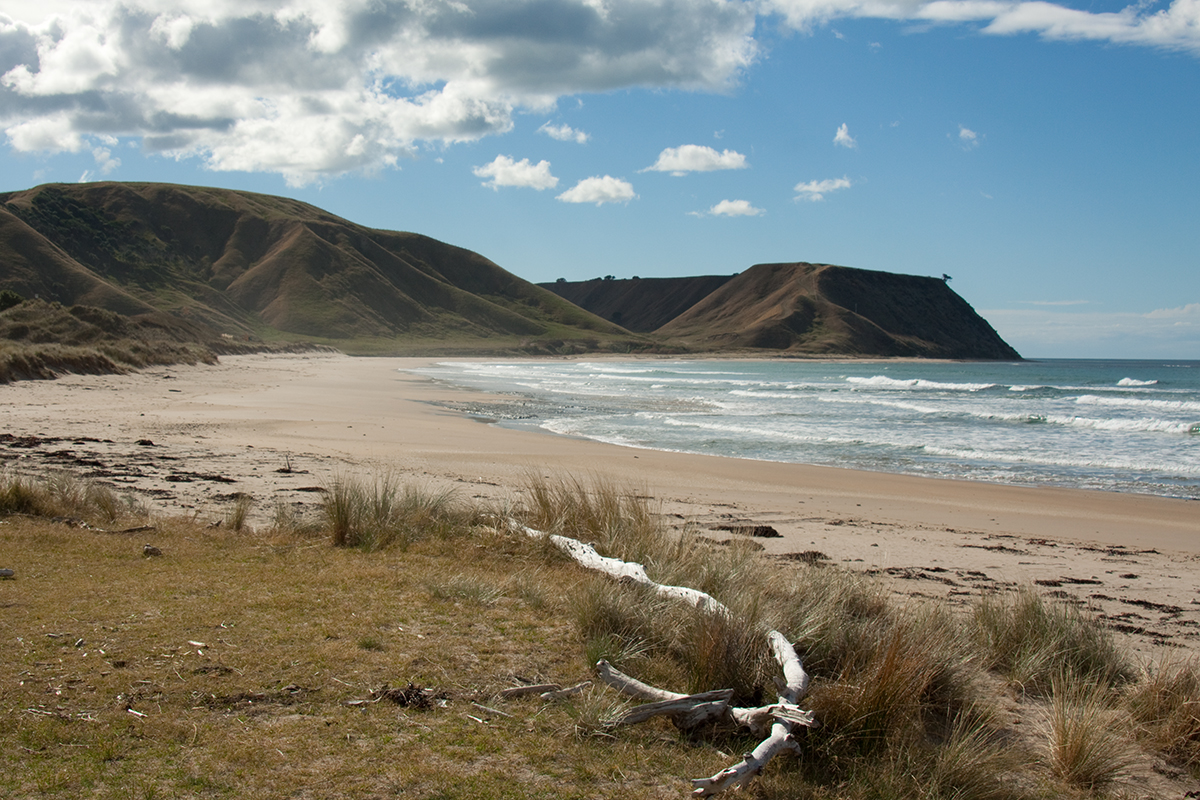
North Island coast, north of Gisborne. Ngāi Tahu originated in the Gisborne District

Tahupōtiki, Ira-a-Tahu, Iraroa, and Tahumuri-hape moved south towards Tūranga, then settled at Maraetaha at the northern end of the Wharerātā Range. Karimoe instead moved northwards and settled at the banks of the Mangaheia stream, inwards of Ūawanui-a-Ruamatua. The family later moved to Iwitea, where Tahupōtiki built the Taumatahīnaki pā. The ancestor Te Matuahanga (descendant of Tūroto and Rakaroa) is still known in the area around there. More pā were established further inland along the Tukemōkihi block.

=== 16th century ===
Owing to growing tensions between the various iwi inhabiting the surrounding area, many groups began their migration away from Waerenga-a-Hika in the Gisborne District. One of the earliest notable instances of tension was where Rākaihikuroa, grandson of Kahungunu, killed his own twin brothers out of jealousy, and was banished after his own son Tupurupuru was killed in revenge.

Perhaps a more notable instance, is when Rākaihikuroa's other son Rākaipaaka was insulted by local Chief Tūtekohi who had invited him to his pā and then fed the prepared feast to his kurī (dog) Kauerehuanui. The visitors showed no reaction at the time, but after leaving, Whaitiripoto instructed Whakaruru-a-Nuku to go back and eat the dog in revenge. This action resulted in war against the Takutaioterangi pā and their allies.

A similar engagement occurred with Ngāi Tahu, involving Chief Rakawahakura (great-grandson of Ira-a-Tahu), Whaitiripoto, and Whakaruru-a-Nuku. The fish and birds for this feast were actually cleverly carved chunks of wood, designed to give the impression of those foods being prepared in the storehouse. The later battle came to be known as Te Whataroa because of this. The children began playing games, enticing the adults to join in as a distraction while the hosts began to form their attack, even killing the visitors' dogs. Tūtekohi ultimately won, and so Ngāi Tahu was forced to move further down the North Island. Rakawahakura was later killed near Waikato.

=== 17th century ===
==== Migration to Wellington ====
From Gisborne the iwi had moved down the coast to the Heretaunga. The ancestress Tūhaitara, senior granddaughter of Rakawahakura, insulting her husband Chief Marukore of Ngāti Māmoe, or Te Kāhea, and his ancestry, as well as various other exchanges are the reason for war between their two iwi. Tūhaitara herself had some Ngāti Māmoe heritage, but he was a local viewed as below her status. The pair had 11 children in total, including Tamaraeroa, Huirapa, Tahumatā, Pahirua and Hinehou. Huirapa is the son who Kāti Huirapa descends from.

Tūhaitara's cousin through Rakawahakura, Kurī, also lived around this time. Just as Tūhaitara was the senior ancestress of Ngāi Tahu with her own hapū named after her, Ngāi Tūhaitara, Kurī is also the ancestor of the prominent Kāti Kurī hapū.

Tūhaitara instructed Tamaraeroa and Huirapa to kill Marukore at a place called Papanui. However, Marukore knew of their plan and defeated them in the Battle of Hūkete after which their sister Hinehou laid them on the floor of her whare for her grandchildren to see, and left her belongings with them before burning down the building in an incident now known as Kārara Kōpae ("The Laying Down of Fighting Chiefs"). Alternatively, Marukore himself burned their bodies on a funeral pyre. Tamaraeroa's wife was killed as well, but they left a son named Te Aohuraki. Huirapa's son Marainaka also survived the fighting.

Next the brothers Pahirua and Tahumatā sought out to defeat Marukore. As they were about to take advice from a local chief named Rākaimoari, his daughter Hinewai-a-tapu made a remark about Tahumatā which sparked the Battle of Te Pakiaka ("The Roots") that lasted for some days. It was named so because Tahumatā caught Hinewai-a-tapu hiding under some tree roots, and made her his wife.

Eventually the Ngāti Māmoe chief Hikaororoa managed to trap Marukore's party in a whare. Hikaororoa asked for the 'chief of the long plume' to come to the door to be cannibalised. Marukore's younger cousin Rokopaekawa took Marukore's headdress (his sign of status) and was sacrificed instead. However he did not cook properly, and the headdress's plume was still visible in the dirt. This was considered a bad omen and so the body was discarded with the incident being called Pikitūroa ("The Long Standing Feather Plumes").

Marukore and Tūhaitara would both die in the Battle of Tapapanui, at the hands of their son Pahirua who was very angry about the whole situation. In one telling of the series of battles, Hinehou and Pahirua built Kārara Kōpae together, and burnt the bodies of all the slain there. The remaining children of the warring parents would move down to a place called Te Oreorehua in Wairarapa where Hinehou was already living, and southward to Te Whanganui-a-Tara within a few generations.

==== Migration to the South Island ====
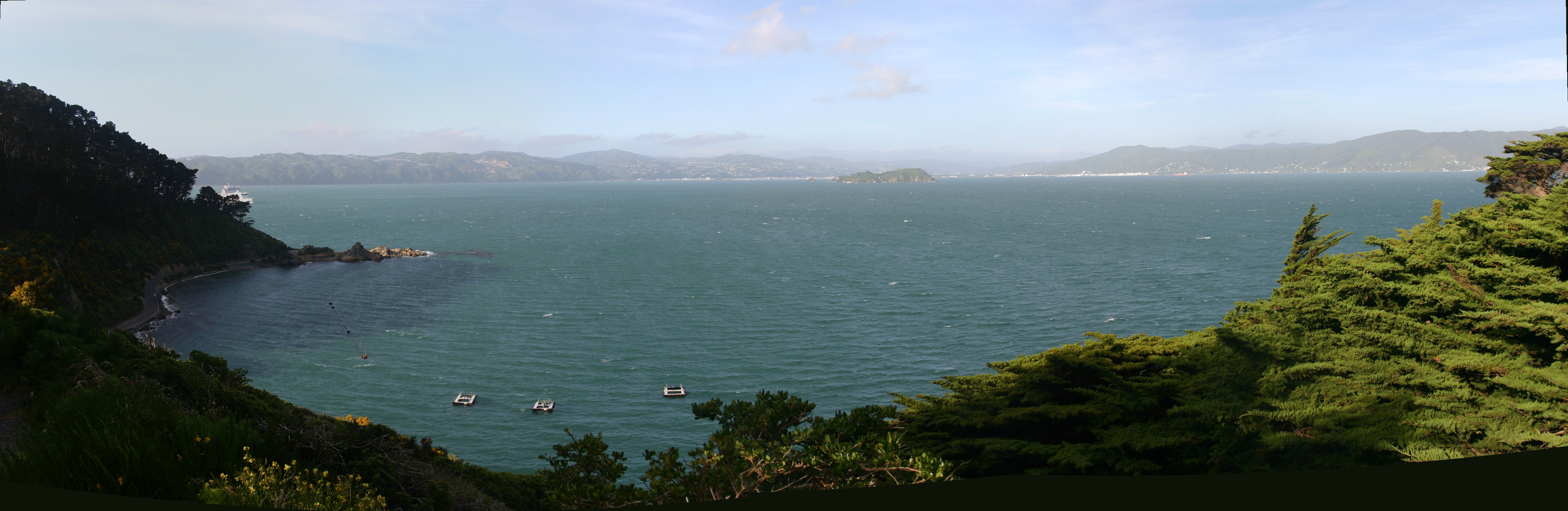
A view of Wellington Harbour, Ngāi Tahu lived in this area before migrating to the South Island

In Wellington Te Aohikuraki, the senior chief, slept with Rākaitekura (a high ranking Ngāi Tahu woman) while her husband Tūmaro was away visiting his family. Of this Te Hikutawatawa (later named Tūāhuriri), the ancestor of Ngāi Tūāhuriri, was born illegitimate. Owing to Rākaitekura's high rank, Tūmaro was unable to kill her, so instead had her prepare herself for marriage with Te Aohikuraki. The stream where she did up her hair was called Koukourārata. Tūmaro gathered his family and departed for Waimea, near Nelson across the Cook Strait, leaving Rākaitekura and Te Hikutawatawa behind.

Curiosity burning in him since childhood, when the other children would pick fun on him for being illegitimate, Te Hikutawatawa left Kaiwhakawaru seeking out his step-father. Upon his arrival to Waimea, Tūmaro's father Kahukura-te-paku, not knowing who he was, had intended to cannibalise him, but later put a stop to the meal preparations when local children heard Te Hikutawatawa muttering of his origins. Kahukura-te-paku then asked Te Hikutawatawa to climb through a window to remove the breach on tapu, where he and Tūmaro greeted him with open arms. Te Hikutawatawa was still outraged at his mana being defiled by Kahukura-te-paku, so he returned later to destroy the site and kill everyone who lived there. After this he was known as Tūāhuriri (tūāhu meaning "sacred altar", riri meaning "to be angry").

Late in the 17th century the iwi began migrating to the northern part of the South Island under the leadership of the Ngāti Kurī chief Pūrahonui, with his sons Makō-ha-kirikiri and Marukaitātea, establishing the Kaihinu pā in the Tory Channel / Kura Te Au. After an incident in which a Ngāi Tahu taua had desecrated the bones of one of Ngāi Tara's ancestors, Pūrahonui was murdered in revenge early one morning when he went to relieve himself. This broke out into a series of battles between the two iwi.

In the North Island, Hikaororoa, a prominent tribal member, attacked Te Mata-ki-kaipoinga pā after Tūāhuriri insulted him. Tūtekawa (Tūāhuriri's brother-in-law of senior Ngāti Kahungunu, Ngāti Porou, and Ngāti Māmoe connections) withdrew his men to attack at another angle after his younger relative recognised an insult from Hikaororoa. He sent the same relative to warn Tūāhuriri to escape, which he did into a nearby bush. For unknown reasons, when Tūtekawa entered the pā, he slew Tūāhuriri's wives Hinekaitaki and Tuarāwhati (Whākuku's sisters). After the battle, Tūtekawa fled down to Waikākahi on the shores of Lake Ellesmere / Te Waihora where he lived amongst his fellow Ngāti Māmoe. Tūtekawa's own wife Tūkōrero was a sister to Tūāhuriri's other wife Hinetewai (mother of Hāmua, Tūrakautahi, and Moki). He was also a first cousin to both the Ngāti Kurī chief Te Rakiwhakaputa, and to the Ngāti Māmoe leader Tukiauau.

On one occasion when Ngāti Kurī fought with Rangitāne, Chief Tūteurutira had mistaken one of his captives, Hinerongo, as one of the enemy's women. She was in fact a member of Ngāti Māmoe who had already been taken captive by Rangitāne, and so he returned her to the Matariki pā near Waiau Toa. This struck a new alliance between their iwi, after which they successfully attacked Rangitāne in the Wairau Valley. For this Ngāti Māmoe then ceded the east coast regions north of Waiau Toa to Ngāi Tahu, and Tūteurutira and Hinerongo married and settled at the pā.

In the Battle of Ōpokihi against Ngāti Māmoe, Marukaitātea was rescued by his brothers Makō-ha-kirikiri and Kahupupuni. At the Pariwhakatau pā near the Conway area, Makō-ha-kirikiri was with his sisters Te Apai and Tokerau, Manawa-i-waho's wives, when Tukiauau sneaked in and killed Manawa. The former three were spared by the protection of the guardian, Te Hineumutahi. However, they were forced to leave the pā through her legs (she would have been a wooden figure or carving suspended in the air).

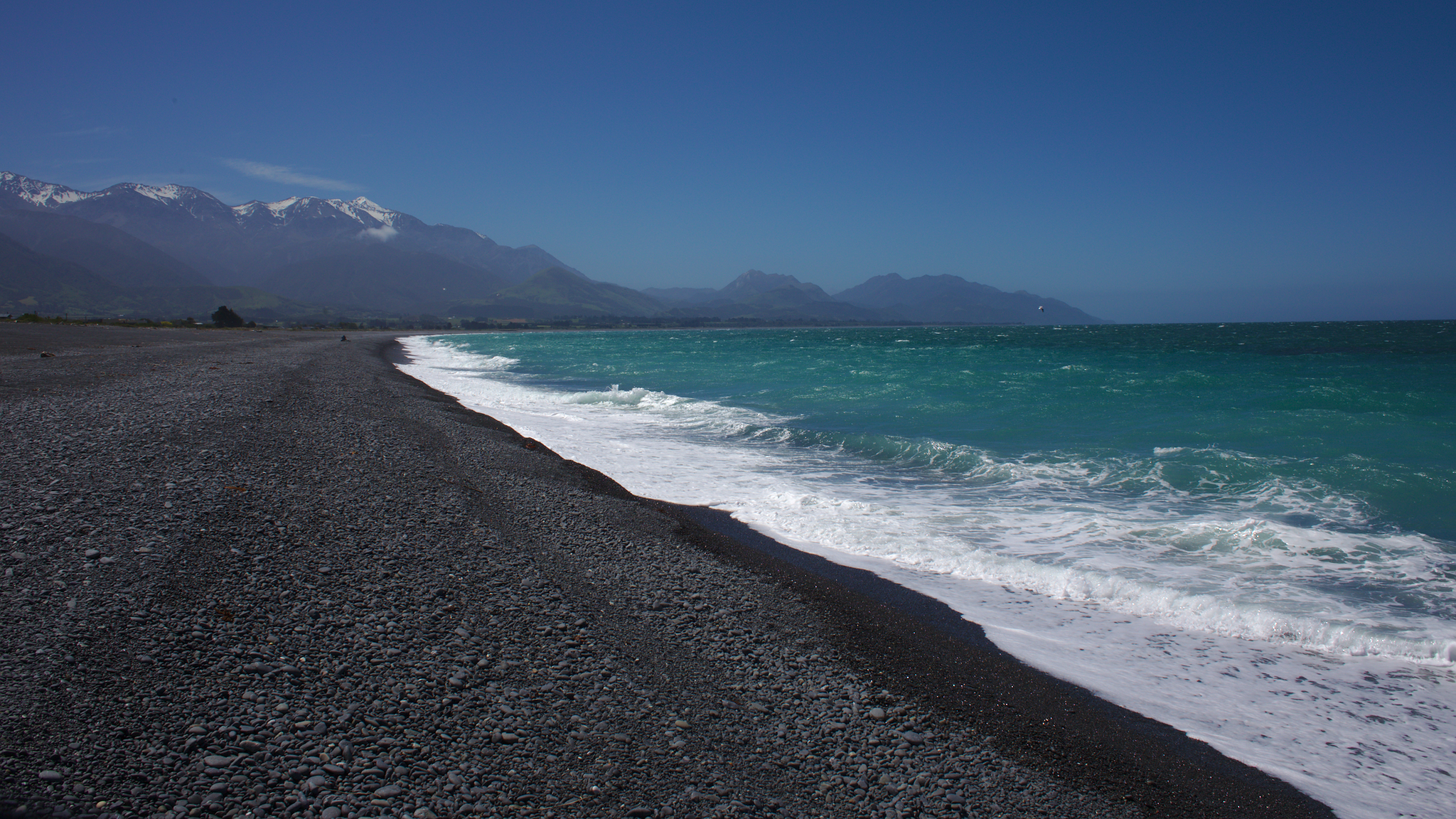
Kaikōura's coast, looking north from the train station. Ngāti Kurī is the local hapū of the area

By the 1690s Ngāi Tahu had settled in Canterbury, including Ngāti Kurī conquering the east coast down to Kaikōura, and Ngāti Irakehu peaceably settling among Banks Peninsula's Ngāti Māmoe. The last battle that was fought between the two iwi up to that point was the Battle of Waipapa, before Ngāti Kurī took the Takahanga pā. Marukaitātea chose to stay here, while other chiefs continued to push south. Around this time, the ariki Tūteāhuka was moving the last of the tribe's members to the South Island through the Cook Strait. As a consequence for ignoring Chief Te Aweawe's advice to strap two canoes together for a safer passage, Tūāhuriri is said to have been left to drown along with Tūmaro while trying to leave Wellington. It is very likely that Tūāhuriri's eldest son Hāmua also drowned, otherwise he might have died in Kaikōura at a young age.

=== 18th century ===
After establishing dominance down to Kaikōura, many of Ngāi Tahu's leading chiefs were ready to expand further south into the island. One, Moki, another son of Tūāhuriri, had received reports from Kaiapu and Tamakino (brothers of Mārewa, Moki's wife) that his father's wife's killer, Tūtekawa, was living just further south at Te Waihora. He set off in his canoe, Makawhiu, and attacked various small villages including the Parakākāriki pā at Ōtanerito. Tūtekawa was ultimately killed by Whākuku instead of Moki, avenging the deaths of his sisters. Tūtekawa's son Te Rakitāmau returned to the home, where he found his wife Punahikoia and children unharmed, and the attackers sleeping near the fire. Te Rakitāmau did not avenge Tūtekawa, but instead left a sign that he spared the attackers' lives, and peace was eventually restored between their descendants.

Chief Te Rakiwhakaputa claimed the area of Whakaraupō, naming the beach Te Rāpaki-o-Te Rakiwhakaputa. He destroyed Ngāti Māmoe's pā at Mānuka, across the hills at Tai Tapu, and prior to that also lived at Te Pā-o-Te Rakiwhakaputa on the Cam River / Ruataniwha for a time. His son Manuhiri drove Ngāti Māmoe out of Ōhinetahi and set up his base there, and his other son Te Wheke set up his own base on Avon River / Ōtākaro's estuary. Makō-ha-kirikiri was given Little River and Wairewa, and Te Ruahikihiki of Kāti Kurī, ancestor of Ngāi Te Ruakihikihi, son of Manawaiwaho and Te Apai, was given Kaitōrete and Te Waihora. Chief Huikai also established himself at Koukourarata (named after the stream in Wellington where Rākaitekura prepared her hair), and his son Tautahi took Ōtautahi (the site of present-day Christchurch). Tūāhuriri's second eldest son Tūrakautahi, the famous chief of Ngāi Tūhaitara born with a club foot, established Te Kōhaka-a-kaikai-a-waro pā (now the Kaiapoi pā) at the Taerutu Lagoon near Woodend, and claimed the area around Banks Peninsula.

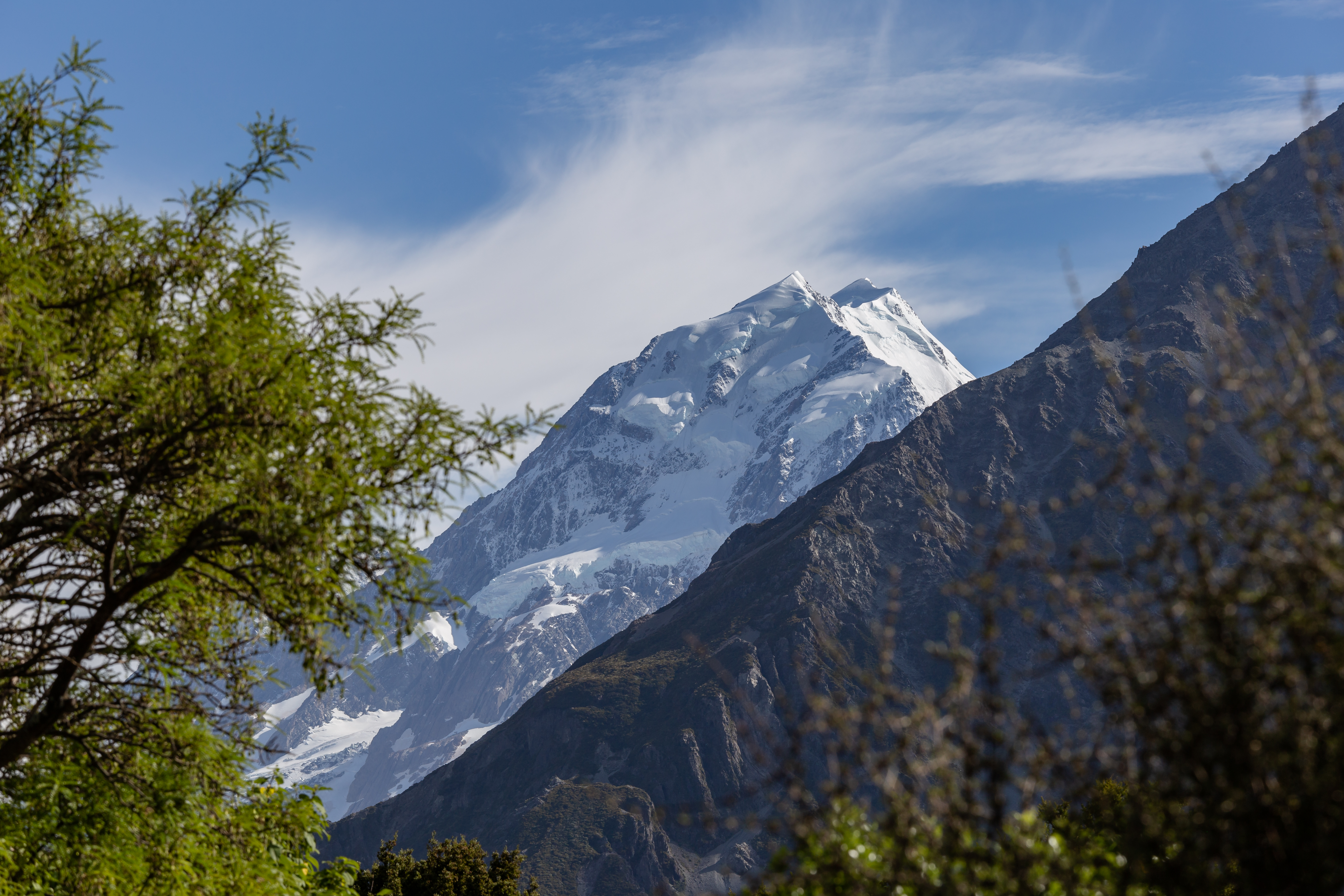
Aoraki / Mount Cook, the tallest mountain of all his brothers. Aoraki was a divine ancestor who froze into stone in Ngāi Tahu myths. The South Island's earliest-known name is Te Waka o Aoraki, in reference to his story

With the discovery of Nōti Raureka (Browning Pass) by its namesake Raureka, of the West Coast iwi Ngāti Wairangi, Ngāi Tūhaitara quickly developed an interest in Te Tai Poutini for the pounamu that can be found there. It is said to have been Tūrakautahi's decision to learn the genealogies and traditions of Ngāti Wairangi and Ngāti Tūmatakōkiri, the former of which already shared a common ancestry with Ngāi Tahu through the ancestors Tura and Paikea, and the latter being of the Kurahaupō waka like Ngāti Māmoe, Ngāi Tara, and Rangitāne. A similar approach was also taken to learn Waitaha's genealogies and stories. Myths that Ngāi Tahu brought to the South Island themselves include those of the Takitimu Mountains (being the Tākitimu waka) and the Āraiteuru.

Tūrakautahi and one Te-ake narrowly escaped slaughter in Ngāti Wairangi territory after others had been slain for breaking sacred customs. Tūrakautahi's brother Tānetiki, and two relatives Tūtaemaro and Tūtepiriraki, had not been so fortunate however. The brothers' uncle Hikatūtae chopped off their heads and returned to the rest of the family at Kaikōura. Makō-ha-kirikiri of Wairewa and Moki both avenged the deaths near where the bodies were found in the water, on the shores of Lake Mahinapua in the battle called Tāwiri-o-Te Makō. Moki was later cursed by two tohunga, Iriraki and Tautini, for insulting two women. He is said to be buried at Kaitukutuku, near the Waikūkū flaxmill. After the battle, Makō-ha-kirikiri established the Ōhiri pā, at Little River. Tūrakautahi further enlisted Te Rakitāmau's aid in overcoming Ngāti Wairangi, killing their rangatira Te Uekanuka near Lake Kaniere.

Tūrakautahi's son Kaweriri with his father-in-law Te Ruahikihiki had settled Taumutu at the southern end of Te Waihora. Kaweriri later travelled with a taua south to Lowther where he was slain by the Kāti Māmoe chief Tutemakohu around the year 1725 during the Battle of Waitaramea. Tūrakautahi's other son by his wife Te Aowharepapa, Rakiāmoa, would continue the main lines of descent of Ngāi Tahu. Te Ruahikihiki's own son Taoka, by his wife Te Aotaurewa, would push further south to Ōtākou, where he engaged in some of the final battles with Ngāti Māmoe.

Over time, marriages were arranged between Ngāi Tahu and Ngāti Māmoe to cement peace. Notably of Raki-ihia (Ngāti Māmoe) and Hinehākiri, the cousin of Ngāi Tahu's leading chief Te-hau-tapunui-o-Tū, and of Honekai, son of Te-hau-tapunui-o-Tū, with Raki-ihia's daughter Kohuwai. Despite this, occasional skirmishes still continued.

Tūhuru Kokare, a grandson of Tūrakautahi's son Waewae (thus chief of Ngāti Waewae), became an active member in the battles against Ngāti Wairangi around the turn of the century. He first defeated them at Lake Brunner, and then began a campaign that moved down from the Karamea district, fighting battles at Whanganui Inlet, Kawatiri, Māwhera, Taramakau, Arahura, Hokitika, Ōkārito, and finally at Makawhio, with the final defeat occurring in Te Paparoa ranges. After their victory, Tūhuru's party discussed at Rūnanga whether they should return home or stay in the area. A decision was not reached, so they discussed the matter again near Kaiata and Omotumotu after crossing Māwheranui, and made the decision to construct a pā at Māwhera. They became known as the Poutini Ngāi Tahu.

=== 19th century ===
==== Kaihuānga feud ====
The Kaihuānga feud of the 1820s heavily involved the upoko ariki (paramount chief) Tamaiharanui, whose status was so spiritually superior within the iwi that people of lower ranking would avert their gaze and avoid looking at him directly. If his shadow fell upon food, that food became tapu and had to be destroyed. The Kaihuānga feud is an historical instance that highlights the importance of the ariki's spiritual status, and the importance of tapu. The feud sparked when a woman from the Waikakahi pā at Wairewa named Murihaka wore a dogskin cloak which belonged to Tamaiharanui, thus causing an insult to him. His followers then killed Rerewaka, a slave of one of Murihaka's relatives. The relatives then responded by killing another chief, Hape.

Hape's wife was a sister to two chiefs from the Taumutu pā at southern Lake Ellesmere / Te Waihora. The people of Taumutu responded to Hape's death by attacking Waikakahi, and killing several people. Tamaiharanui led a taua against Taumutu, and sacking it. The Taumutu then asked the hapū of Otago for assistance, to which Taiaroa and Te Whakataupuka led a taua, and along with warriors from Kaiapoi, all attacked Waikakahi. They found the pā empty however, as Taiaroa had warned their people that the attackers would arrive with muskets. It is thought that this was the first instance of firearms in Canterbury.

Since they had killed nobody at Waikakahi, the Kaiapoi warriors feared ridicule. They happened across the nephew of Chief Taununu, of Rīpapa Island, and killed him. In retaliation Taununu overran the Whakaepa pā, near Coalgate, killing the inhabitants. The Otago hapū attacked Waikakahi again, and although Taiaroa had again warned them, they were pursued and killed. Two of Tamaiharanui's close kin, his sisters, were slaughtered. The Otago and Taumutu parties destroyed the Rīpapa pā before returning to Otago. Many settlements and communities along Banks Peninsula were abandoned in the series of retaliatory attacks.

Tamaiharanui then went to Otago and persuaded the Taumutu people to come back home, assuring that the war was over. He however returned first and lay in wait for the Taumutu people with muskets. According to Hakopa Te Ata-o-Tu, a member of Tamaiharanui's party, Tamaiharanui became less enthusiastic about the attack when he realised the refugees had their own muskets. Nonetheless, he was convinced to attack, and the refugees were killed. The final act of the feud was the killing of Taununu, who was tomahawked to death along with his companion, near Ōtokitoki.

==== Wars with Ngāti Toa ====
In 1827–1828 Ngāti Toa, under the leadership of Te Rauparaha and armed with muskets, successfully attacked Kāti Kurī at Kaikōura, who were already expecting the Tū-te-pākihi-rangi hapū of Ngāti Kahungunu as friendly visitors. He named the battle Niho Maaka ("Shark's Tooth") after a threat from Rerewaka, a local chief. Ngāti Toa then visited Kaiapoi, ostensibly to trade. When Ngāti Toa attacked their hosts, the well-prepared Ngāi Tahu killed all the leading Ngāti Toa chiefs except Te Rauparaha who subsequently returned to his stronghold at Kapiti Island. During this time Ngati Tumatakokiri continued attacking the Poutini Ngāi Tahu from Kawatiri over land and hunting disputes, with Ngāti Rārua also attacking the Poutini Ngāi Tahu with muskets, seeking pounamu.

In November 1830 Te Rauparaha persuaded Captain John Stewart of the brig Elizabeth to carry him and his warriors in secret to Takapūneke near present-day Akaroa, where by subterfuge they captured Tamaiharanui and his wife and daughter. After destroying Takapūneke they embarked for Kapiti with their captives. Tamaiharanui strangled his daughter and threw her overboard to save her from slavery. Ngāti Toa killed the remaining captives. John Stewart, though arrested and sent to trial in Sydney as an accomplice to murder, nevertheless escaped conviction. Another captive, Hōne Tīkao (Ngāi Te Kahukura, Ngāi Tūāhuriri) did survive and would later visit France.

In the summer of 1831–1832 Te Rauparaha attacked the Kaiapoi pā. After a three-month siege, a fire in the pā allowed Ngāti Toa to overcome it. Ngāti Toa then attacked Ngāi Tahu on Banks Peninsula and took the pā at Onawe. In 1832–33 Ngāi Tahu retaliated under the leadership of Tūhawaiki, Taiaroa, Karetai, and Haereroa, attacking Ngāti Toa at Lake Grassmere. Ngāi Tahu prevailed, and killed many Ngāti Toa, although Te Rauparaha again escaped.

In 1834 Chief Iwikau, brother of Te Maiharanui, led a war party into the Marlborough Sounds, though Ngāti Toa had hidden from them and could not be found. The campaign was known as Oraumoanui or Tauanui.

Fighting continued for a year or so, with Ngāi Tahu maintaining the upper hand. In 1836 Chief Te Pūoho of Ngāti Tama, allied to Ngāti Toa, led his taua from Whanganui Inlet down to the West Coast to the Haast River. From there he crossed the Haast Pass into central Otago and Southland. Tūhawaiki had by now learned of this oncoming attack, and led his own taua from Ruapuke Island to Tuturau, where he fought and killed Te Pūoho.

Ngāti Toa never again made a major incursion into Ngāi Tahu territory. By 1839 Ngāi Tahu and Ngāti Toa established peace and Te Rauparaha released the Ngāi Tahu captives he held at Kapiti. Formal marriages between the leading families in the two tribes sealed the peace.

==== Treaty of Waitangi ====
In 1840 more than 500 chiefs from all over New Zealand signed the Treaty of Waitangi with representatives of the Crown. Only one sheet was used in the South Island – the Herald (Bunbury) sheet carried with Major Thomas Bunbury aboard HMS Herald which sailed from the Bay of Islands on 28 April. The Cook Strait (Henry Williams) sheet was used at Arapaoa Island and Rangitoto ki te Tonga / D'Urville Island at the northern end of the South Island, but was not signed by Ngāi Tahu.

The sheet's first four signatures came from Coromandel Harbour one week later on 4 May, and the next two were signed aboard HMS Herald just off the Mercury Islands on 7 May. These signatures were collectively from the iwi Ngāti Whanaunga, Ngāti Pāoa, and Ngāti Maru.

The first Ngāi Tahu signatory was Chief Iwikau at Akaroa on 30 May, followed by Hone Tīkao signing as John Love. His nephew was Hone Taare Tikao.

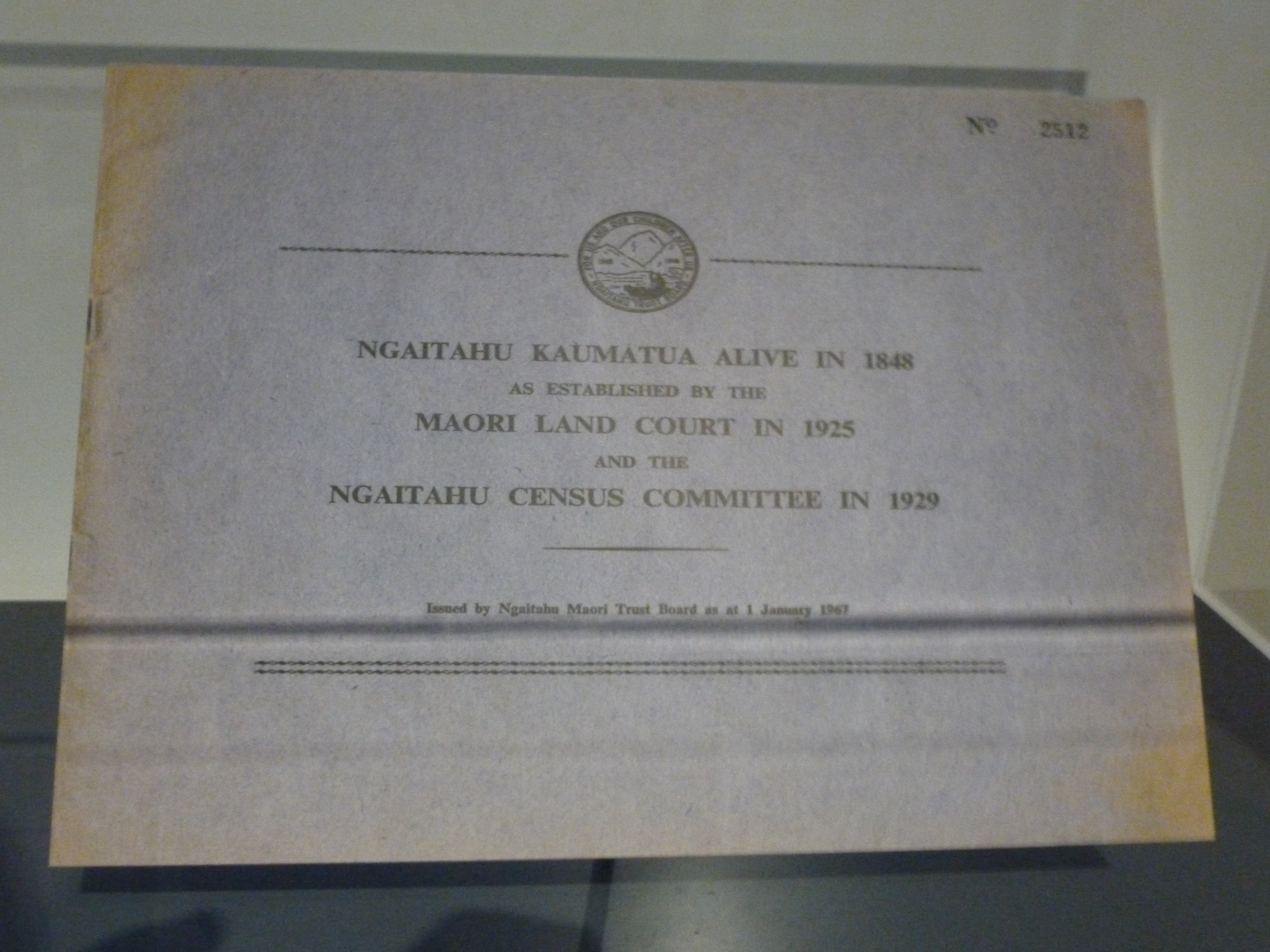
The Blue Book: recording Ngāi Tahu kaumatua alive in 1848

The third Ngāi Tahu signatory was Chief Tūhawaiki signing as John Touwaick aboard HMS Herald at Ruapuke Island on 10 June, who requested Kaikoura (possibly Kaikōura Whakatau) to sign on the same day, who was then followed by Taiaroa (or Tararoa; possibly Te Mātenga Taiaroa).

The last Ngāi Tahu signatures were from Otago Heads on 13 June. The signatories were Hone Karetai (Ngāti Ruahikihiki, Ngāi Te Kahukura, Ngāi Tūāhuriri, Ngāti Hinekura) signing as John Karitai at Ōtākou, and one Korako (Ngāi Tūāhuriri, Ngāti Huirapa) whose identity is not known for certain, but could be either Hōne Wētere Kōrako, Kōrako Karetai, or Hoani Kōrako among others.

The last signatures mostly came from members of Ngāti Toa at Te Koko-o-Kupe / Cloudy Bay (17 June) and Mana Island (19 June) – including Te Rauparaha who had already signed the Cook Strait (Henry Williams) sheet on 14 May – and from three Ngāti Kahungunu members at Hawke's Bay on 24 June, amounting to a total of 27 signatures for the sheet.

=== 20th century ===
==== Antarctica connection ====
At the very end of the 19th century a Ngāi Tahu man named William Timaru Joss (1844–1895), a Stewart Island whaler and captain of the mailboat Ulva, was a member of the first confirmed landing party of the Antarctic on the continent of Antarctica at Cape Adare, along with Captain Kristensen, Bull, Borchgrevink, and Tunzelmann in January 1895, making Joss the first known Māori to get so close to the continent. Timaru William Joss (1905–1955), William Timaru's grandson, joined Admiral Richard E. Byrd's expedition to Antarctica in 1935.

==== World War era ====
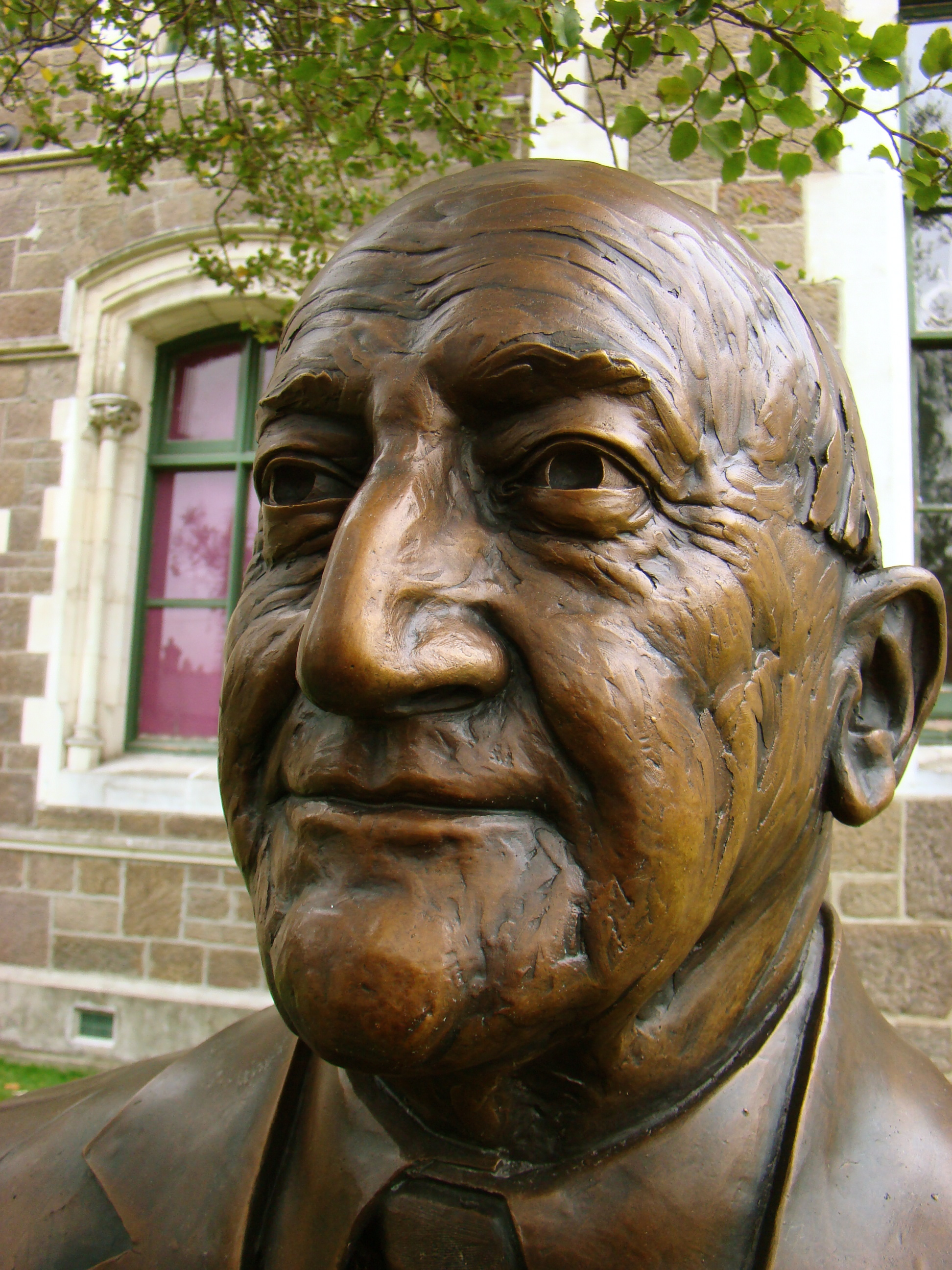
Sculpture of Tipene O'Regan, rangatira, kaumātua, writer, orator, teacher, and principal negotiator of the Ngai Tahu settlement

Over 270 individuals of Ngāi Tahu connection served during World War I, including some who fought with the New Zealand (Māori) Pioneer Battalion. A handful of notable servicemen included: Turu Rakerawa Hiroti, Hoani Parata, James William Tepene, and John Charles Tamanuiarangi Tikao, all of whom held the rank of captain. One soldier born of chiefly ranking was Private Hohepa Teihoka of Kaiapoi, who was nearly 19 years old when he arrived in Dardanelles in July 1915.

George Henry West (Kāi Te Rakiāmoa) was the first pilot of Māori-descent to join the Royal New Zealand Air Force (RNZAF) in 1936. During a training flight on the night of 11 May 1939, his student accidentally undershot a landing exercise. West died of his injuries the following day. John Pohe was otherwise the first full-blooded Māori pilot to join the RNZAF in 1941.

Turu Rakerawa Hiroti and John Charles Tamanuiarangi Tikao would go on to serve during World War II. The former serving as a recruitment officer, and the latter serving as a captain with the Māori Battalion. Timaru William Joss also served with the United States Navy, in charge of a barge during the Normandy landings.

==== Ngāi Tahu Claims Settlement Act 1998 ====
The New Zealand Parliament passed the Ngāi Tahu Claims Settlement Act in 1998 to record an apology from the Crown and to settle claims made under the 1840 Treaty of Waitangi. One of the Act's provisions covered the use of dual English and Māori names for geographical locations in the Ngāi Tahu tribal area. The recognised tribal authority, Te Rūnanga o Ngāi Tahu, is based in Christchurch and in Invercargill.

=== 21st century ===
==== South Island rivers claim ====
In 2021, the iwi began legal proceedings against the New Zealand government, claiming "repeated failures over successive governments to protect the country's waterways" and further that "the crown must recognise their rangatiratanga — governing authority and self-determination — over waterways stretching across most of the South Island". A core contributor to the degradation of water quality has been the growth of intensive dairy farming over three decades which has left many South Island rivers with deficient streamflows and problematic nitrate‑based eutrophication. Between 1990 and 2020, the number of dairy cattle in the Canterbury region increased from 113,000 to over 1.2 million. Included in that number are Ngāi Tahu's own cattle; the business arm of the iwi has a substantial farming investment.

== Dialect ==
In the 19th century many Ngāi Tahu, particularly in the southernmost reaches of the South Island, spoke a distinct dialect of the Māori language, sometimes referred to as Southern Māori, which was so different from the northern version of the language that missionary Rev. James Watkin, based at Karitane found materials prepared by North Island missions could not be used in Otago. However, from the 20th century to the early 21st century, the dialect came close to extinction and was officially discouraged.

Southern Māori contains almost all of the same phonemes as other Māori dialects (/a, e, i, o, u, f, h, k, m, n, p, r, t, w/), along with the same diphthongs but lacks /ŋ/ ("ng"), a sound that merged with /k/ in prehistoric times: Ngāi Tahu becomes Kāi Tahu. The change did not occur in the northern part of the Ngāi Tahu area, and the possible presence of additional phonemes (/b, p, l, r/) has been debated. Nonstandard consonants are sometimes identified in the spellings of South Island place names, such as g (as distinct from k, e.g., Katigi, Otago), v (e.g., Mavora), l instead of r (e.g., Little Akaloa, Kilmog, Waihola, Rakiula), and w or u instead of wh as reflecting dialect difference, but similar spellings and pronunciations also occur in the North Island (e.g. Tolaga Bay).

The apocope, the dropping of the final vowel of words, resulting from pronunciations like 'Wacky-white' for "Waikouaiti" has been identified with Southern Māori. However, the devoicing, rather than apocope, of final vowels occurs in the speech of native Māori-speakers throughout New Zealand, and the pronunciation of the names of North Island towns by locals often omits final vowels as well, like in the pronunciation of "Paraparam" or "Waiuk".

== Governance ==
Te Rūnanga o Ngāi Tahu (TRoNT) is the governance entity of Ngāi Tahu, following the Treaty of Waitangi settlement between the iwi and the New Zealand Government under Ngāi Tahu Claims Settlement Act 1998. It is also a mandated iwi organisation under the Māori Fisheries Act 2004, an iwi aquaculture organisation under the Māori Commercial Aquaculture Claims Settlement Act 2004, an iwi authority under the Resource Management Act 1991 and a Tūhono organisation. It also represents Ngāi Tahu Whānui, the collective of hapū including Waitaha, Ngāti Māmoe, and Ngāi Tahu, including, Ngāti Kurī, Ngāti Irakehu, Ngāti Huirapa, Ngāi Tūāhuriri, and Ngāi Te Ruahikihiki, under Te Rūnanga o Ngāi Tahu Act 1996.

The interests of Ngāi Tahu cover a wide range of regions, including the territories of Tasman District Council, Marlborough District Council, West Coast Regional Council, Environment Canterbury, Otago Regional Council and Environment Southland, and the district councils which make up these regional councils.

Papatipu rūnanga/rūnaka, as constituent areas of Ngāi Tahu, each have an elected board which then elect a representative to Te Rūnanga o Ngāi Tahu. Ngāi Tahu has a very corporate structure, in part due to the death of an important upoko ariki (paramount chief), Te Maiharanui, at the time of the arrival of Europeans in New Zealand. Under the Resource Management Act, both the trust and local papatipu rūnanga should be consulted with about natural resource matters. The 18 representatives of papatipu rūnanga oversee Te Rūnanga o Ngāi Tahu as a charitable trust. The kaiwhakahaere (chairperson) from 2016 was Lisa Tumahai, the chief executive officer is Arihia Bennett, the general counsel is Chris Ford, and the trust is based in Addington, Christchurch. Justin Tipa, a board member, was appointed kaiwhakahaere in 2023. In 2024 Bennett stepped down as chief executive after 12 years in the role.

== Rūnanga and marae ==
=== Canterbury rūnanga ===
Ngāi Tahu has nine rūnanga in Canterbury:

- Te Rūnanga o Kaikōura centres on Takahanga and extends from Te Parinui o Whiti to the Hurunui River and inland to the Southern Alps / Kā Tiritiri o te Moana. Takahanga marae in Kaikōura includes Maru Kaitatea meeting house.
- Te Ngāi Tūāhuriri Rūnanga centres on Rūnanga Tuahiwi and extends from the Hurunui to Hakatere, sharing an interest with Arowhenua Runanga northwards to the Rakaia River, and thence inland to the Southern Alps / Kā Tiritiri o te Moana. The Tuahiwi marae of the Ngāi Tūāhuriri hapū is located in Tuahiwi and includes Māhunui II meeting house.
- Rapaki Rūnanga centres on Te Rāpaki-o-Te Rakiwhakaputa and includes the catchment of Whakaraupo and Te Kaituna. Rāpaki Marae, also known as Te Wheke Marae, is located near Governors Bay.
- Te Rūnanga o Koukourarata centres on Koukourarata and extends from the Pōhatu pā to the shores of Lake Ellesmere / Te Waihora, including Te Kaituna. Koukourarata Marae is located in Koukourarata, and includes Tūtehuarewa meeting house.
- Wairewa Rūnanga centres on Wairewa and the catchment of Lake Te Wairewa and the hills and coast to the adjoining takiwā of Koukourarata, Onuku Rūnanga, and Taumutu Rūnanga. Wairewa marae is located at Little River and includes Te Mako meeting house.
- Te Rūnanga o Ōnuku centres on Ōnuku and the hills and coasts of Akaroa to the adjoining takiwā of Te Rūnanga o Koukourarata and Wairewa Runanga. Ōnuku marae includes the Karaweko meeting house.
- Taumutu Rūnanga centres on Taumutu and the waters of Lake Ellesmere / Te Waihora and adjoining lands and shares a common interest with Te Ngāi Tūāhuriri Rūnanga and Te Rūnanga o Arowhenua in the area south to Hakatere. The local marae, Ngāti Moki, is located in Taumutu.
- Te Rūnanga o Arowhenua centres on Arowhenua, Temuka and extends from Rakaia to Waitaki, sharing interests with Ngāi Tūāhuriri ki Kaiapoi between Hakatere and Rakaia, and thence inland to Aoraki / Mount Cook and the Southern Alps / Kā Tiritiri o te Moana. The Ngati Huirapa (hapū) Arowhenua, Te Hapa o Niu Tireni, Temuka.
- Te Rūnanga o Waihao centres on Wainono, sharing interests with Te Rūnanga o Arowhenua to the Waitaki River, and extends inland to Omarama and the Southern Alps / Kā Tiritiri o te Moana. The Waihao marae is in Waimate.

=== Otago rūnanga ===
Ngāi Tahu has three rūnanga in Otago:

- Te Rūnanga o Moeraki centres on Moeraki and extends from Waitaki to Waihemo and inland to the Southern Alps / Kā Tiritiri o te Moana. Moeraki marae is at Moeraki and has the Uenuku meeting house.
- Kati Huirapa ki Puketeraki centres on Karitane and extends from Waihemo to Purehurehu and includes an interest in Dunedin and the greater harbour of Ōtākou. The takiwā extends inland to the Southern Alps / Kā Tiritiri o te Moana, sharing an interest in the lakes and mountains to Whakatipu-Waitai with rūnanga to the south. The Huirapa hapū have the Puketeraki marae in Karitāne.
- Te Rūnanga o Ōtākou centres on Ōtākou and extends from Purehurehu to Te Matau and inland, sharing an interest in the lakes and mountains to the western coast with rūnanga to the north and to the south (includes the city of Dunedin). Ōtākou Marae is located at Otago Heads, and includes the Tamatea meeting house.

=== West Coast rūnanga ===
Ngāi Tahu has two rūnanga in Westland:

- Te Rūnanga o Makaawhio centres on Mahitahi and extends from the south bank of the Pouerua River to Piopiotahi and inland to the Main Divide, together with a shared interest with Te Rūnanga o Ngāti Waewae in the area situated between the north bank of the Pouerua River and the south bank of the Hokitika River. Their marae, Te Tauraka Waka a Maui, at Mahitahi, officially opened on 23 January 2005. Southern Westland, only thinly settled by Māori, had — uniquely in the iwi's region — lacked a marae for 140 years. The marae includes the Kaipo meeting house.
- Te Rūnanga o Ngāti Waewae (sometimes Te Rūnaka o Kāti Waewae) centres on the Arahura River and Hokitika and extends from the north bank of the Hokitika River to Kahurangi Point and inland to the Southern Alps / Kā Tiritiri o te Moana, together with a shared interest with Te Rūnanga o Makaawhio in the area situated between the north bank of the Pouerua River and the south bank of the Hokitika River. Ned Tauwhare is currently chair of the rūnanga. Arahura marae, north of Hokitika, includes the Tūhuru meeting house.

=== Southland rūnanga ===
Ngāi Tahu has four rūnanga in Southland:

- Waihopai Rūnaka centres on Waihopai and extends northwards to Te Matau sharing an interest in the lakes and mountains to the western coast with other Murihiku rūnanga and those located from Waihemo southwards. The Murihiku marae and Te Rakitauneke meeting house are located in Invercargill.
- Te Rūnanga o Awarua centres on Awarua and extends to the coasts and estuaries adjoining Waihopai sharing an interest in the lakes and mountains between Whakatipu-Waitai and Tawhititarere with other Murihiku rūnanga and those located from Waihemo southwards. Its marae, Te Rau Aroha, is located at Bluff, and includes Tahu Potiki meeting house.
- Te Rūnanga o Oraka Aparima centres on Colac Bay / Ōraka and extends from Waimatuku to Tawhititarere sharing an interest in the lakes and mountains from Whakatipu-Waitai to Tawhititarere with other Murihiku rūnanga and those located from Waihemo southwards. The rūnanga has a marae, Takutai o te Titi, in Riverton.
- Hokonui Rūnanga centres on the Hokonui region and includes a shared interest in the lakes and mountains between Whakatipu-Waitai and Tawhitarere with other Murihiku rūnanga and those located from Waihemo southwards. Its marae, O Te Ika Rama, is located in Gore.

== Trading enterprise ==
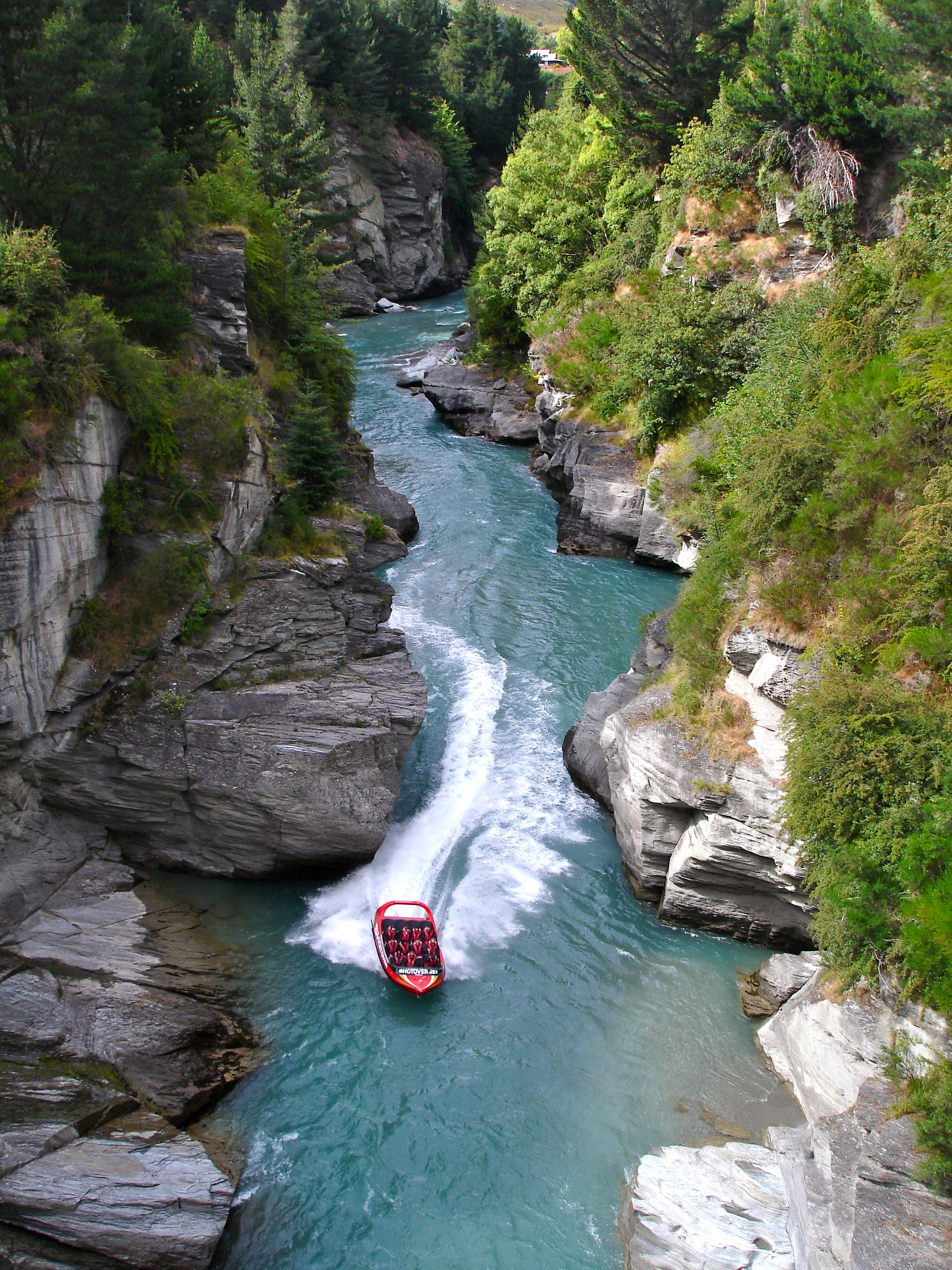
Shotover Jet in Queenstown is one of several assets owned by Ngāi Tahu Holdings.

Ngāi Tahu actively owns or invests in many businesses throughout the country. In the 2008 financial year, Ngāi Tahu Holdings had a net surplus of $80.4 million, of which $11.5 million was distributed to members of the iwi via rūnanga and whānau.

=== Tourism ===
- Shotover Jet
- Aqua Taxi in the Abel Tasman National Park
- Dart River Safaris on the Dart River / Te Awa Whakatipu
- Franz Josef Glacier Guides at Franz Josef Glacier
- Hollyford Guided Walks in the Hollyford Valley
- Huka Jet at Huka Falls
- Kaiteriteri Kayaks in the Abel Tasman National Park
- Hikuwai Indoor Ice Climbing (management)
- Rainbow Springs Nature Park at Rotorua
- Kiwi Encounter (allied to Rainbow Springs)
- Whale Watch Kaikōura
- Wasp Marine at Queenstown
- Agrodome at Rotorua

=== Primary industries ===
- Ngāi Tahu Seafood
- 31 forests totaling more than 100,000 hectares

=== Property and other investments ===
Ngāi Tahu Property has assets with a market value in excess of $550 million. Ngāi Tahu has an investment portfolio of prime properties including:

- Akaroa residential developments
- Armstrong Prestige, Christchurch
- Christchurch Civic Building
- Christchurch Courts Complex
- The former Christchurch Police Station site
- Christchurch Post Building (with Christchurch City Council)
- Christchurch residential developments
- Dunedin Police Station
- Franz Josef Glacier Hot Pools
- Governor's Bay residential developments
- Iveagh Bay Terraces
- Lincoln Farm subdivision (with Lincoln University)
- Mahaanui Office (for Department of Conservation)
- Building 4 (Queenstown Courts Building)
- Queenstown Police Station
- Pig and Whistle, Queenstown
- Ryman Healthcare (40 million shares)
- Sockburn Business Park, Blenheim Road
- Tower Junction Village, Addington
- Tower Junction Megacentre, Christchurch
- Turners Car Auctions, Addington
- Tumara Park
- Wigram Air Base, Christchurch
- Wigram National Trade Academy
- Wigram Village

=== Tahu FM ===
Tahu FM is the iwi's official radio station. It began as Christchurch's Te Reo Iriraki Ki Otautahi on 6 February 1991. Between 1996 and 2001, it formed a broadcasting partnership with Mai FM and began playing more urban contemporary music. It changed its name to Tahu FM in December 1997, and briefly changed its name to Mai FM in 1999 before reverting to Tahu FM. It broadcasts in Christchurch on 90.5 FM. In 2000 it began broadcasting Kaikōura on 90.7 FM, Dunedin on 95.0 FM, Invercargill on 99.6 FM, and around the country on 505 Sky Digital.

Tahu FM resumed broadcasting five days after the 2011 Christchurch earthquake, with assistance from Te Upoko O Te Ika and other iwi radio stations, and operated as the city's Māori language civil defence station. In December 2014 it was recognised as the country's highest-rating Māori radio station.

== Notable Ngāi Tahu ==
- Te Mātenga Taiaroa (c. 1795 – 2 February 1863), Ngāi Tahu leader
- Hōri Kerei Taiaroa (born 1830s or early 1840s – 4 August 1905), Member of New Zealand parliament, Ngāi Tahu chief
- Peter Arnett ONZM (1934-2025), international journalist
- Ulva Belsham QSO (1921–2011), World War II telegraphist and Ngāi Tahu researcher
- Martha Sarah Kahui Bragg (1895–1975), dairy farmer and foster parent to 38 children
- Ricki-Lee Coulter (born 1985), singer
- Riki Ellison (born 1960), linebacker, first New Zealander to play in the NFL
- Thomas Rangiwahia Ellison (c. 1867–1904), rugby player and lawyer
- Darrin Hodgetts, social psychology academic
- Keri Hulme (born 1947), Booker Prize-winning author
- Karetai (c. 1805–1860), Ngāi Tahu chief, Treaty of Waitangi signatory
- Miriama Kamo (born 1973), journalist and television presenter
- Jeremy Latimore (born 1986), rugby league player
- Sandra Lee (born 1952), politician
- Sacha McMeeking (born 1977/8), University of Canterbury academic, lawyer and activist
- Sir Tipene O'Regan (born 1939), kaumātua, company director, and academic, and negotiator in Ngāi Tahu Claims Settlement Act 1998
- Dame Marilyn Pryor DSG (1936–2005), Catholic pro-life advocate
- Rachael Rakena (born 1969), artist
- Sir Mark Wiremu Solomon KNZM (born c. 1954), tribal leader
- Billy Stead (1877–1958), All Black rugby player
- John Taiaroa (1862–1907), All Black rugby player and lawyer
- Tamaiharanui (17??– c. 1830/31), paramount chief
- Lilia Tarawa (born 1990/1991), author, speaker, entrepreneur, former member of the Gloriavale Christian Community
- Henare Rakiihia Tau (1941–2014), kaumātua; county, district, and tribal councillor, and negotiator in Ngāi Tahu Claims Settlement Act 1998
- Hōne Taare Tīkao (1850–1927), leader, scholar, and politician
- Selwyn Toogood QSO ED (1916–2001), Radio and Television personality
- Hone "Bloody Jack" Tūhawaiki (c. 1805–1844), Ngāi Tahu chief, Treaty of Waitangi signatory
- Storm Uru (born 1985), Olympic rower
- Richard Rangi Wallace QSM, Anglican bishop
- Piri Weepu (born 1983), All Black rugby player
- Kaikōura Whakatau (−1868), New Zealand tribal leader
- Wharetutu (early 1800s – after 1870), founding mother
- Marlon Williams (born 1990), singer
- Frank Winter MBE (1906–1976), kaumātua
- Jonathan Winter (born 1971), Olympic swimmer
