= Keogan =

Keogan is an anglicized form of the Irish surname Mac Eochagain, which was wrongly corrupted to Ó Ceogáin. Notable people with the surname include:

- Christopher Keogan (born 1992), English snooker player
- Donal Keogan (born 1991), Irish Gaelic footballer
- George Keogan (1890–1943), American football, basketball and baseball coach
- Murray Keogan (born 1950), Canadian ice hockey player
- Sharon Keogan (born 1967), Irish politician

== See also ==
- Keegan
