= John Howell (pioneer) =

New Zealand whaler, trader, pastoralist and politician (1809–1874)

Personal details
- Born: 1809 Eastbourne, Sussex, England
- Died: 25 May 1874 (aged 64) Sydney, New South Wales, Australia
- Resting place: Riverton Cemetery, Southland, New Zealand
- Spouse(s): 1. Kohikohi; 2.; Caroline Brown (m. 1846)
- Children: 19
- Relatives: Thomas Ellison (son-in-law); Selwyn Toogood (great-grandson); Ulva Belsham (great-great granddaughter); Marilyn Pryor (great-great-great granddaughter); Theophilus Daniel (brother-in-law)
- Occupation: Pastoralist; politician; settler; trader; whaler
- Known for: Founding Riverton

John Howell (1809 – 25 May 1874) was a New Zealand whaler, trader, pastoralist and politician.

Howell was born in 1809. He settled in New Zealand, and established the settlement that is today known as Riverton. He was a member of the Southland Provincial Council from 1862 to 1864 for the Riverton electorate, and from 1864 to 1867 for the Aparima electorate.

Howell's Cottage, which was built for him at Riverton in 1837/38, is the oldest building in Riverton. It is one of very few surviving New Zealand buildings that predates the 1840s, and is listed as a Category I building by Heritage New Zealand.
