= Wharetutu =

Ngāi Tahu founding mother

Wharetutu Anne Newton (early 1800s – after 1870) was a New Zealand Ngāi Tahu founding mother.

Her year of birth is not known but she had her first child in 1827 with George Newton, a sealer from Kirkcaldy, Scotland. For many years, they lived in a settlement that was called Otaku on Stewart Island / Rakiura where the Murray River flows into the sea. When bishop George Selwyn visited in 1844, Wharetutu was christened Anne and she married Newton; by then they had had 10 of their 13 children. Her husband died in 1853 and Wharetutu later lived at The Neck, a peninsula of Rakiura. She died there after 1870. Wharetutu was one of the first Ngāi Tahu woman who lived with, and later married, a Pākehā man. By 1986, over 5,000 descendants had been traced.
