= John Keegan (disambiguation) =

John Keegan (1934–2012) was a British military historian.

John Keegan may also refer to:

- John Keegan (footballer) (born 1981), English professional footballer
- John Keegan (Australian politician) (1867–1941), Australian trade unionist and politician
- John Keegan (writer), Irish mythologist
- John C. Keegan (born 1952), American judge and politician
