= This Is My Dream (song) =

Single by Kashy Keegan

from the album This Is My Dream
- Released: 25 October 2013
- Length: 3:26
- Label: Evosound
- Songwriter: Kashy Keegan

"This Is My Dream" is a song by British singer-songwriter Kashy Keegan.

== Background ==
The song was originally a 2012 London Olympics motivational song and was later discovered by Hong Kong Television Network HKTV and used as the theme song for the launch of the network. It is also the theme song for HKTV's documentary series The Challenge (Chinese: 挑戰). Jennifer O’Mahony of AFP news agency described the song as an "anthem for overcoming adversity" after the song became the unofficial soundtrack for protests in Hong Kong triggered by the refusal of a broadcast license for HKTV in October 2013.
