= Howell's Cottage =

Coordinates: 46°21′11″S 168°01′03″E

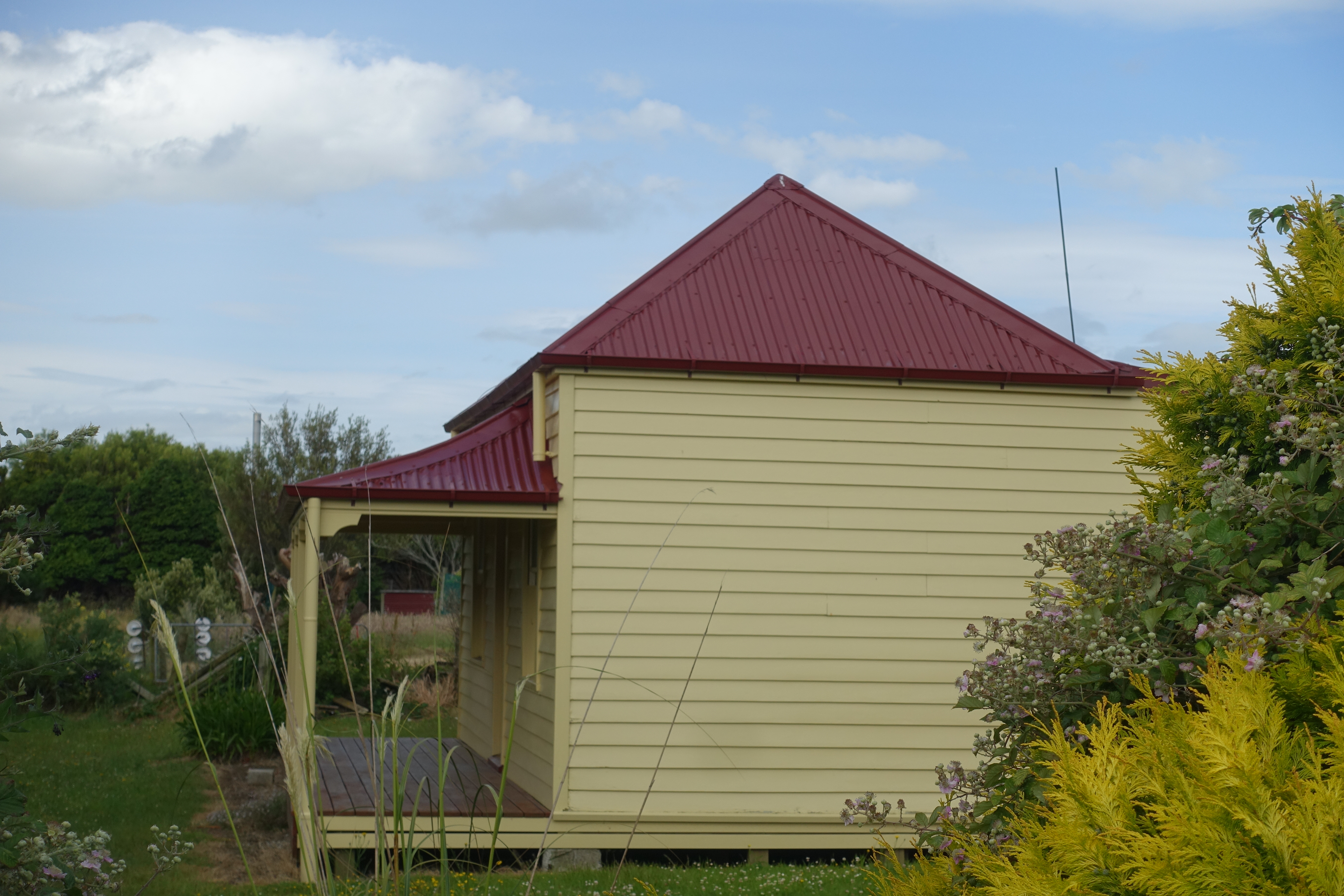
Howell's Cottage in 2018

Howell's Cottage, also known as Te Whare Kohikohi, is a house in Riverton, New Zealand. It was built by the founder of Riverton, Captain John Howell for his wife Kohi Kohi, and is thought to be the first house built in the town. It was built in 1837–38, making it one of very few surviving New Zealand buildings predating the 1840s. On 20 February 1992, the house was listed as a Category I building with Heritage New Zealand.
