= Senator Keegan =

Senator Keegan may refer to:

- Betty Ann Keegan (1920–1974), Illinois State Senate
- Joseph M. Keegan (1922–2007), New Jersey State Senate
