= Kaikōura Whakatau =

Kaikōura Whakatau (died 1868) was a leader of the New Zealand Māori tribe Ngai Tahu.

Kaikōura lived in Oaro and was of the Ariki (senior) line. He signed the Treaty of Waitangi on 10 June 1840, on board the vessel HMS Herald.
