= Martha Sarah Kahui Bragg =

New Zealand dairy farmer and voluntary child welfare worker

- Born: Martha Sarah Kāhui Isaac (Īhakara); March 30, 1895; The Neck, New Zealand
- Died: May 26, 1975 (aged 80); Masterton, New Zealand
- Burial place: Kohunui cemetery
- Occupations: Child welfare worker farmer
- Known for: Voluntary child welfare work
- Spouses: Whare Īhaka Whakaka Hūtana; Joseph William Bragg
- Parents: Walter Bruce Joss (father); Maryanne (Mereana) Louise Mapepe Isaac (mother)

Martha Sarah Kahui Bragg (30 March 1895–26 May 1975) was a New Zealand dairy farmer and a voluntary child welfare worker. Of Māori descent, she identified with the Ngai Tahu (South Island) iwi and is remembered for fostering or adopting many children, successfully raising 38 young people through her own efforts and actively supported by her Māori community.
