= Selwyn Toogood =

New Zealand radio and television personality (1916–2001)

Selwyn Toogood QSO ED
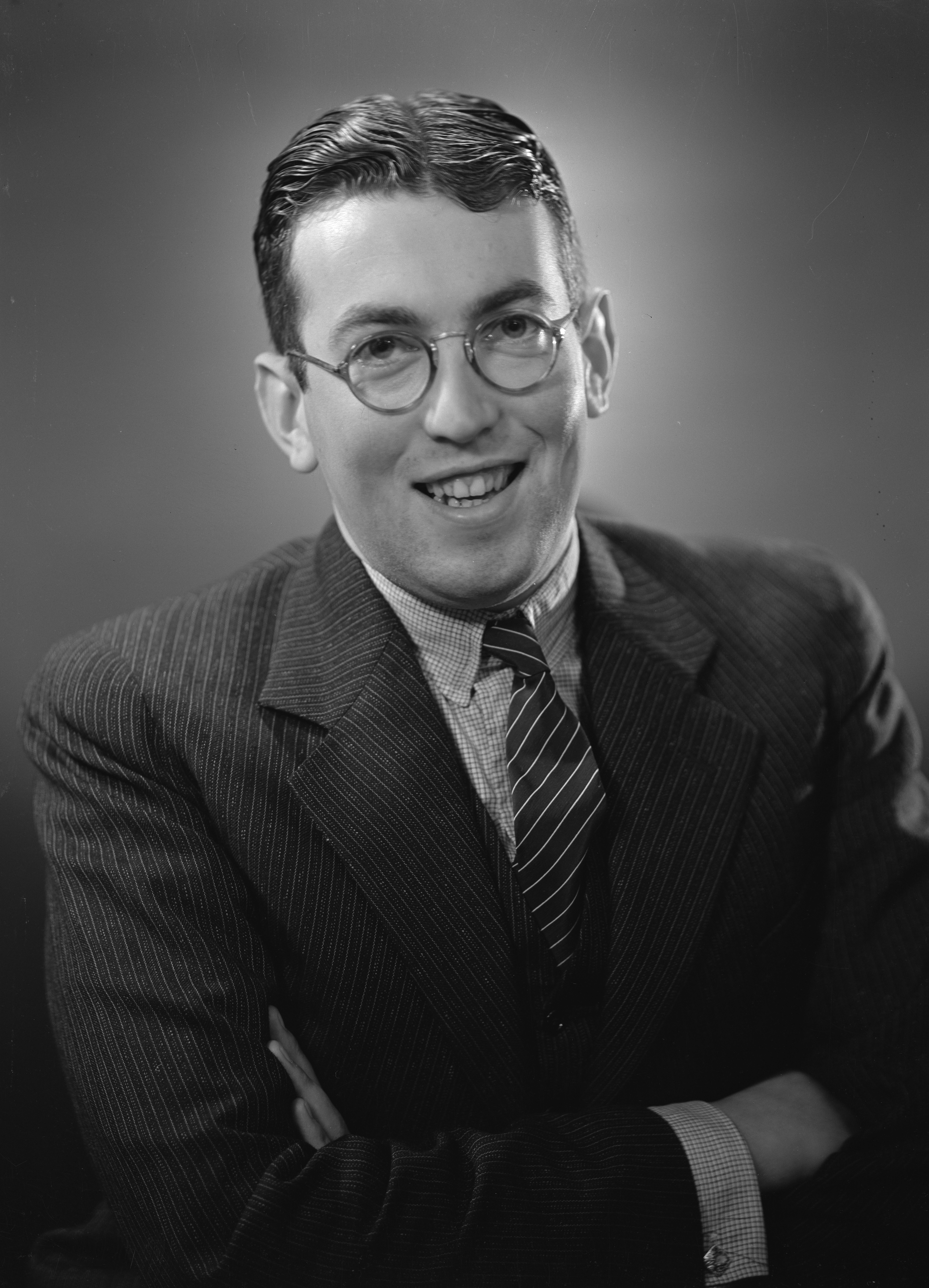
- Toogood in 1937
- Born: Selwyn Featherston Toogood; 4 April 1916; Wellington, New Zealand
- Died: 27 February 2001 (aged 84); Auckland, New Zealand
- Occupations: Radio and television personality
- Known for: It's in the Bag; Beauty and the Beast
- Spouse: Cynthia Holden Webb (m. 1948)
- Relatives: Richard Webb (brother-in-law); John Howell (great-grandfather)

Selwyn Featherston Toogood QSO ED (4 April 1916 – 27 February 2001) was a New Zealand radio and television personality.

== Early life and family ==
Born in Wellington on 4 April 1916, Toogood was the son of Henry Featherston Toogood and Ethel Lois Copus "Noonie" Toogood (née Butler). Through his mother, Toogood was the great-grandson of John Howell, who established a whaling station at Riverton, and his second wife, Caroline Brown, whose mother was Māori from the Ngāi Tahu iwi. Toogood did not learn of his Māori ancestry until he was 18 years old.

Toogood was educated at Wellesley College and Wellington College, where he had an inauspicious career, apart from excelling in the dramatic arts.

On 30 June 1948, Toogood married Cynthia Holden Webb at St Peter's church, in Willis Street, Wellington. Cynthia's brother was Sir Richard Webb, who served as the New Zealand Chief of Defence Staff between 1971 and 1976. The Toogoods went on to have two sons, including Kit Toogood, who was appointed a Queen's Counsel in 1999 and a High Court judge in 2011.

== Military service ==
Toogood joined the army following the outbreak of World War II. As an ammunition officer, he saw active service in Greece, North Africa and Italy, rising to the rank of major. He was mentioned in dispatches in 1944, in recognition of gallant and distinguished service in Italy.

In 1953, Toogood was awarded the Efficiency Decoration.

== Acting and broadcasting career ==
After leaving school, Toogood became involved in theatre and radio, including a role in New Zealand's first radio soap opera. On a troopship on the way home from World War II, he ran his first quiz show. After the war, Toogood picked up where he had left off as a stage actor, voice-over artist and radio announcer.

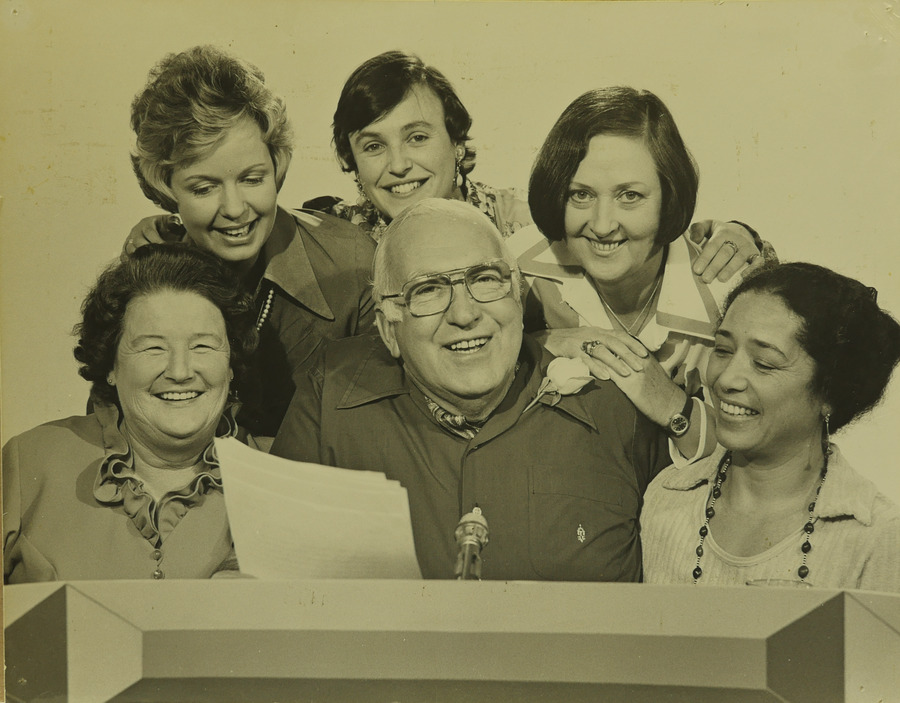
Toogood (centre) as host of Beauty and the Beast, surrounded by panellists (from left) Jean McLean, Denise Brady, Lorraine Isaacs (director), Shona McFarlane, and Johnny Frisbie

He began his career as a radio host in 1946 and was the originator of the game show It's in the Bag, in which he popularised the catch-phrases, "By hokey", and "What will it be, customers - the money or the bag?", in New Zealand. It's in the Bag eventually moved on to network television, where it was equally successful. Before the general adoption of television broadcasting in New Zealand, Toogood also introduced the weekly radio Hit Parade on Wednesday evenings and published his autobiography Out Of The Bag in 1979. Additionally, Toogood hosted numerous other TV shows for the Broadcasting Corporation of New Zealand and Television New Zealand, including the panel show Beauty and the Beast and the children's quiz show W3. He retired from It's in the Bag in the 1980s, handing over the mantle to radio and TV host John Hawkesby.

In the 1977 New Year Honours, Toogood was appointed a Companion of the Queen's Service Order for community services. Toogood was awarded a special lifetime achievement award by the New Zealand Academy of Film and Television Arts in New Zealand in 1999.

== Death ==
Toogood died in Auckland in 2001, and his ashes were buried in Karori Cemetery. Cynthia Toogood died in 2005.

== See also ==
- List of New Zealand television personalities
