= Desmond Keegan =

Irish academic

Desmond Keegan is an Irish academic in the field of education.

== Education ==
He attended the University College Dublin where he pursued a BA in Classical European Civilization and his MA (Master of Arts) in Medieval European Civilization. Keegan laid the foundations differentiating distance education from regular study. In 1979 he initiated the international journal Distance Education, which is now in its 36th year of publication. This was the first publication of its kind to focus on distance education as a new area of scholarship. Keegan proposed some of the fundamental issues that are still outstanding. Some of the issues include The Role of Time Synchronous Technology, Access Equity and Social Impact of Distance Education, Didactics or Skills Required by Learners and Teachers in using Electronic Technology and The Market and Willingness of Students to Partake in Electronic Classrooms.

== Academic career ==
Year	Position	Institution	Academic achievement
1978–1983	Head of School	South Australian College of External Studies	Manager of distance education system
1980	Founder of Distance Education: an international journaland joint executive editor with I.Mitchell	International journal	Published On defining distance education
1984–1985	Director General	Consorzio per l'Università a Distanza	CEO of distance university system
1985	Author	Croom Helm Ltd, London	Ph.D. published as Foundations of distance education
1992–2003	Founder, editor and later joint editor with A.Tait of series of volumes on distance education	Routledge Ltd, London and New York	Routledge Studies in Distance Education Series(20 volumes)
2008	Author	HETAC, Dublin, Ireland	Ph.D. for published works

== Publications ==
Keegan's doctoral thesis was published by Groom Helm named Foundations of Distance Education in 1986. In 1990 the second edition was published by Routledge followed by the third in 1996. This was translated into Italian in 1994 and Chinese in 1997. His work was also chosen as a set text for the Open University of the United Kingdom for the MA in Open and Distance Education in 1997. In his extended work in 1996 he laid the foundation of Distance Education different from regular study.

He has published ten books on distance education and related subjects:

Keegan, D. (1984) (with Börje Holmberg and David Sewart) Distance Education: international perspectives. London: Croom Helm, (1988) London and New York: Routledge (2nd edition).

Keegan, D. (1985) (with Francesco Lata) L’università a distanza. Riflessioni e proposte per un nuovo modello di università. (The distance university. Reflections and proposals for a new university model). Milano: Franco Angeli.

Keegan, D. (1986) Foundations of distance education. London: Croom Helm (first edition), (1990) London and New York:Routledge (2nd edition), (1996) London and New York: Routledge (3rd edition).

Keegan, D. (1993) Theoretical principles of distance education. London and New York; Routledge.

Keegan, D. (1994) (with Keith Harry and Magnus John) Distance education: new perspectives. London and New York; Routledge.

Keegan, D. (1994) The industrialisation of teaching and learning: Otto Peters on distance education. London and New York; Routledge.

Keegan, D. (1997) Distance education in the European Union. Brussels: European Commission.

Keegan, D. (1995) (with Gérard Weidenfeld) L’enseignnement à distance à l’aube du troisième millénaire. (Distance education at the dawn of the 3rd millennium). Futuroscope: CNED.

Keegan, D. (2000) Yuancheng Jiaoyu Yahjiu. (The study of distance education). Shijiazhuang: Hebei Scientific and Technology Press.

Keegan, D. (2000) Distance training: taking stock at a time of change. London and New York: Routledge.

He also published 35 technical analyses of distance education, e-learning, and mobile learning.

Various online publications between 1992 and 2003 include:

- Keegan, D. (1992) The Competitive advantages of distance teaching universities
- Keegan D (1994) Principi di istruzione a distanza. (Resumen de Spinelli, Angela)
- Keegan D (1998) Designing a web based training system
- Dunne D and Keegan D (1999) The didactic value of internet telephony
- Keegan, D. (2003) – Review of the Book: Morten Flate Paulsen (2003) Online education and learning management systems. Global e-learning in a Scandinavian perspective
- Keegan D (2003) Pedagogy and support systems in e-learning

== Contributions to distance education ==
Keegan entered the field of distance education in 1978 when he was appointed Head of School at the South Australian government College of External Studies (SACES)

In 1980 he founded an international journal on distance education. Today in its 36th year it remains a leading journal in the field.

In 1992 he founded a series of academic volumes on the theory and practice of distance education, called the Routledge Studies in Distance Education Series.20 volumes were published between 1992 and 2003. Professor A. Tait of the Open University of the United Kingdom, became joint executive editor during the course of the Series.

== Research ==
Keegan's major theoretical contribution on the theory and practice of distance education was termed ‘the reintegration of the teaching acts’. It focused on the characteristic of distance education of the separation of the teacher and the learner, contrary to nearly 2000 years of history of education in the West. The daily work of the distance educator is to reintegrate the teaching acts shattered by the benefits of distance education.

He carried out a census study of distance education in the European Union on 1 January 1996 counting every student enrolled in every distance education institution in every one of the, then, 15 member states, with 889.893 enrolled in government distance training institutions, 997.967 in correspondence schools and colleges, 462.784 in the 5 open universities and 151.192 in distance education courses from conventional universities for a total of 2.350.795 students. This showed that distance education was the chosen form of training for over 2.000.000 European students per year and at an average enrollment fee of between €100 and €1000 per year was a largely unknown and unstudied billion euro European training industry. This research was published by the European Commission in Brussels.

Keegan also contributed to the development of a new form of distance education which he called ‘mobile learning’ (distance education on smartphones and small tablets). In 1999 he developed his first project in the field for the European Commission and this was funded in early 2000
