= Brendan Keegan =

American business executive

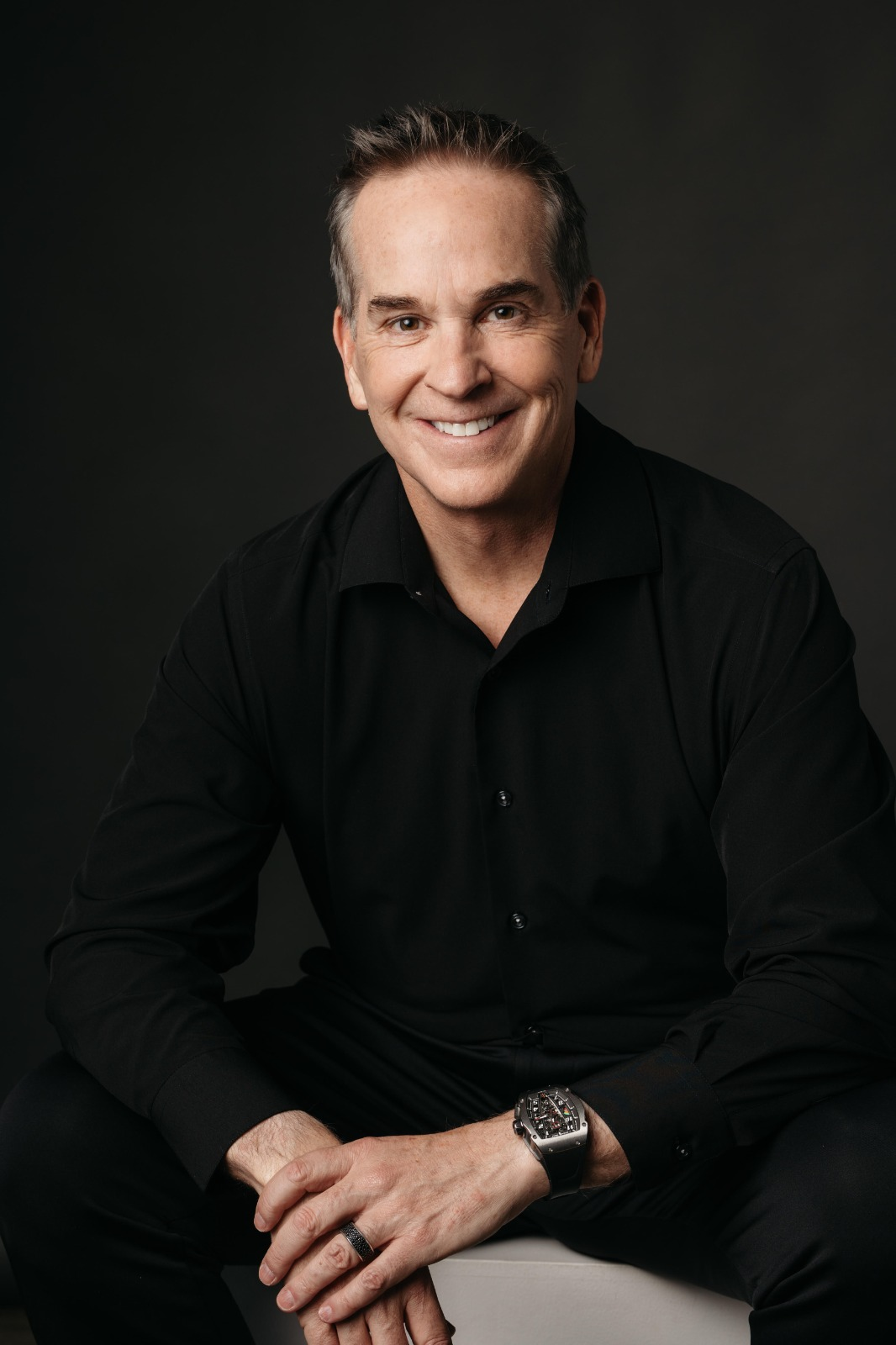
- Born: July 30, 1969 (age 57); Nashua, New Hampshire
- Education: Rensselaer Polytechnic Institute; George Washington University
- Occupations: Business executive author speaker philanthropist
- Notable work: The FUD Factor
- Website: brendanpkeegan.com

Brendan P. Keegan is an American business executive, author, speaker and philanthropist who has served as president and chief executive officer of six companies for over 25 years and most recently served as the chief executive officer of Merchants Fleet from 2018 to 2024.

== Early life and education ==
Keegan was born and raised in Nashua, New Hampshire. He received his early education from the Bishop Guertin High School. During his time at Guertin, he led the senior class all four years as class president, served as captain of both football and baseball, and named All-State in both sports. He received his bachelor's degree in management from the Rensselaer Polytechnic Institute where he also served as class president all four years and also played for the engineers football team. He continued his education with an MBA in finance and management from the George Washington University.

Keegan became a distinguished fellow of Dartmouth College in November 2013.

== Career ==
Keegan began his career at Electronic Data Systems (EDS) as a systems engineer. Later, he was promoted to the chief sales officer (CSO). He also moved to Silicon Valley in 1999 and served as a CSO of Netigy, CEO of Bravanta, and president of Seven Worldwide, and BancTec.

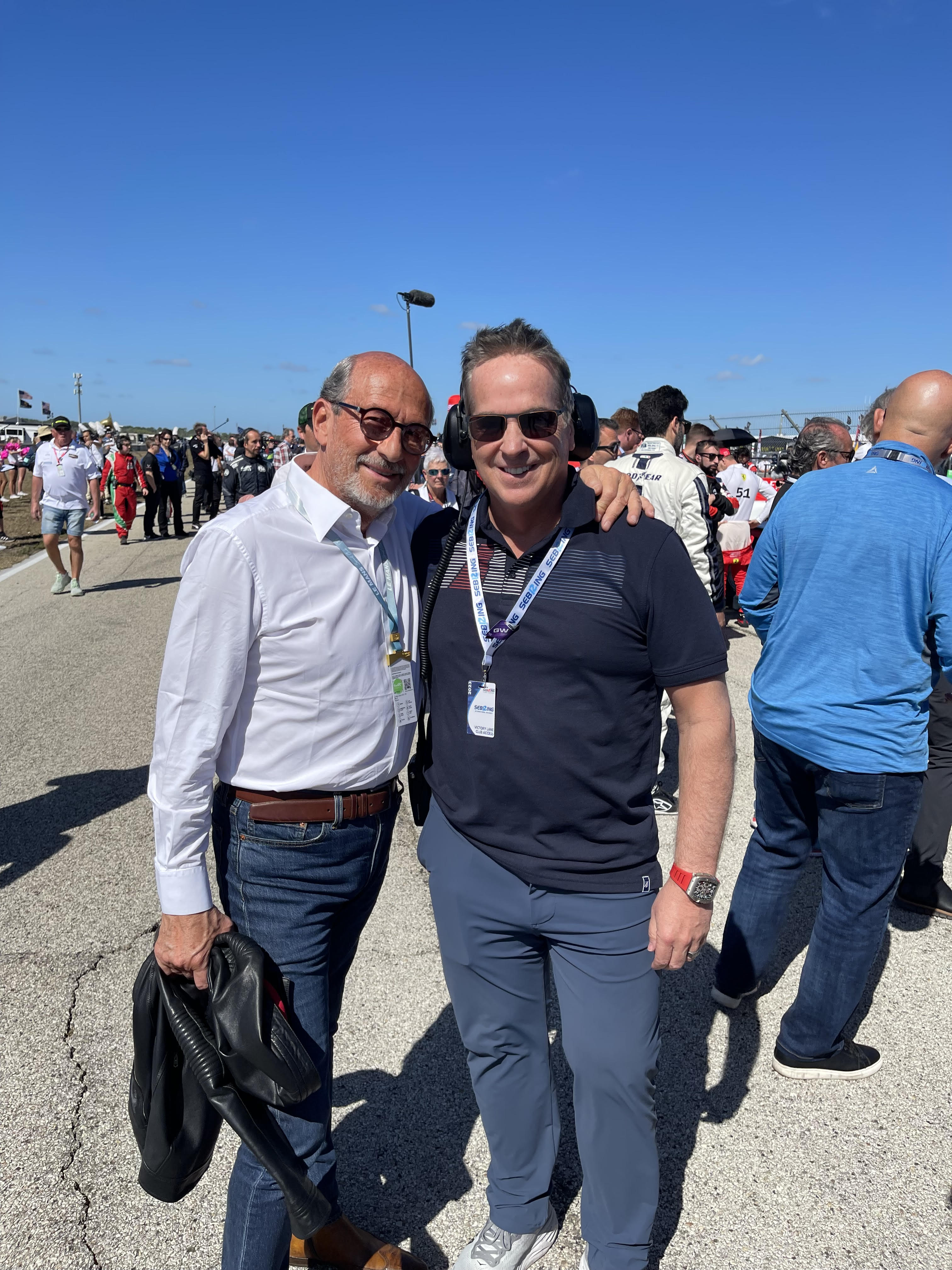
Keegan with the watchmaker Richard Mille

In 2009 BandTec sold the IT division to WorldwideTechServices (WWTS) where Keegan went with the strategic sale and became President & CEO of the combined company. In 2012, Keegan founded a business consulting firm named velocityHUB where he also served as the managing partner.

Keegan joined Merchants Fleet in 2015 as a board director and Chairman of the Compensation Committee. Later he served as the chairman, CEO and president of the company from 2018 to 2024. In 2020, Merchants Fleet was included in the Inc. 5000 list. In 2021, Brendan lead the charge of EV adoption in the fleet industry by committing $2.5 billion to electric vehicles. Later in 2022, Merchants Fleet was named in the World's Most Innovative Companies list by Fast Company and was also named a 5-time Deloitte Best Managed Company.

In 2022, Keegan led Merchants through an acquisition led by Bain Capital and the Abu Dhabi Investment Authority (ADIA) and retained an ownership stake in the company. In 2024, Keegan retired from Merchants Fleet and launched bFEARLESS Ventures an investment and advisory firm where he has made investments, owns and serves on the board of Andretti Extreme E Racing and United Autosports,The Authority Company, Pure Electric, ExpressIT Delivery, Skymeadow Country Club, Central Park Tower and 111 West 56^{th} Street. He is also a member of Fast Company Executive Board, Forbes Business Council, Rolling Stone Culture Council , Maxim Sphere and Entrepreneur Leadership Network. Additionally, Keegan serves as Vice Chair of the RPI Athletics Board and Board Member of the RPI Lally School of Management Leadership Council. Keegan serves on more than 20 corporate and academic boards while maintaining a portfolio of private investments reportedly valued at more than $50 million across ten ventures. In 2026, Keegan launched an exotic supercar business, bFEARLESS Exotics, with business partner Seth Blais.

Keegan hosts The Fearless Experience podcast and Fast and Fearless podcast.

In 2025, Governor Kelly Ayotte appointed Keegan to the Commission on Government Efficiency or "COGE", a commission tasked with cutting spending by the New Hampshire government. COGE is modeled on the Department of Government Efficiency, which does similar work at the federal level.

Keegan is widely associated with the "bFearless" leadership philosophy.

== Awards and honors ==
Brendan Keegan has accumulated more than 100 awards spanning executive leadership, innovation, entrepreneurship, company performance, and racing success. He was recognized as World's Most Innovative CEO by CEO World Awards, Visionary of the Year by Reuters-affiliated recognition programs, Distinguished Fellow at Dartmouth College, Fast 50 CEO of the Year, Entrepreneur of the Year by San Francisco Times.

He has also been recognized as Inspiring Leader of the Year by Inspiring Workplaces and Titan Awards, Thought Leader of the Year by the Stevie Awards, Executive of the Year by Best in Biz and the Business Intelligence Group, and one of New Hampshire's 40 Most Influential Business Leaders. His contributions to athletics and service have additionally been recognized through honors such as Football Coach of the Year from USA Football and Volunteer of the Year from the Police Athletic League,Volunteer of the Year from the Nashua Chamber of Commerce and Entrepreneur of the Year by Enterpise Bank.

Under his leadership, Merchants Fleet earned repeated corporate distinctions, including five consecutive selections as a Deloitte U.S. Best Managed Company, Fast Company recognition as one of the World's Most Innovative Companies, four appearances on the Inc. 5000 list of fastest-growing private companies, Fortune workplace honors, Bain Capital portfolio excellence awards, and multiple Stevie and Titan awards for innovation.

== Motorsports and racing ==
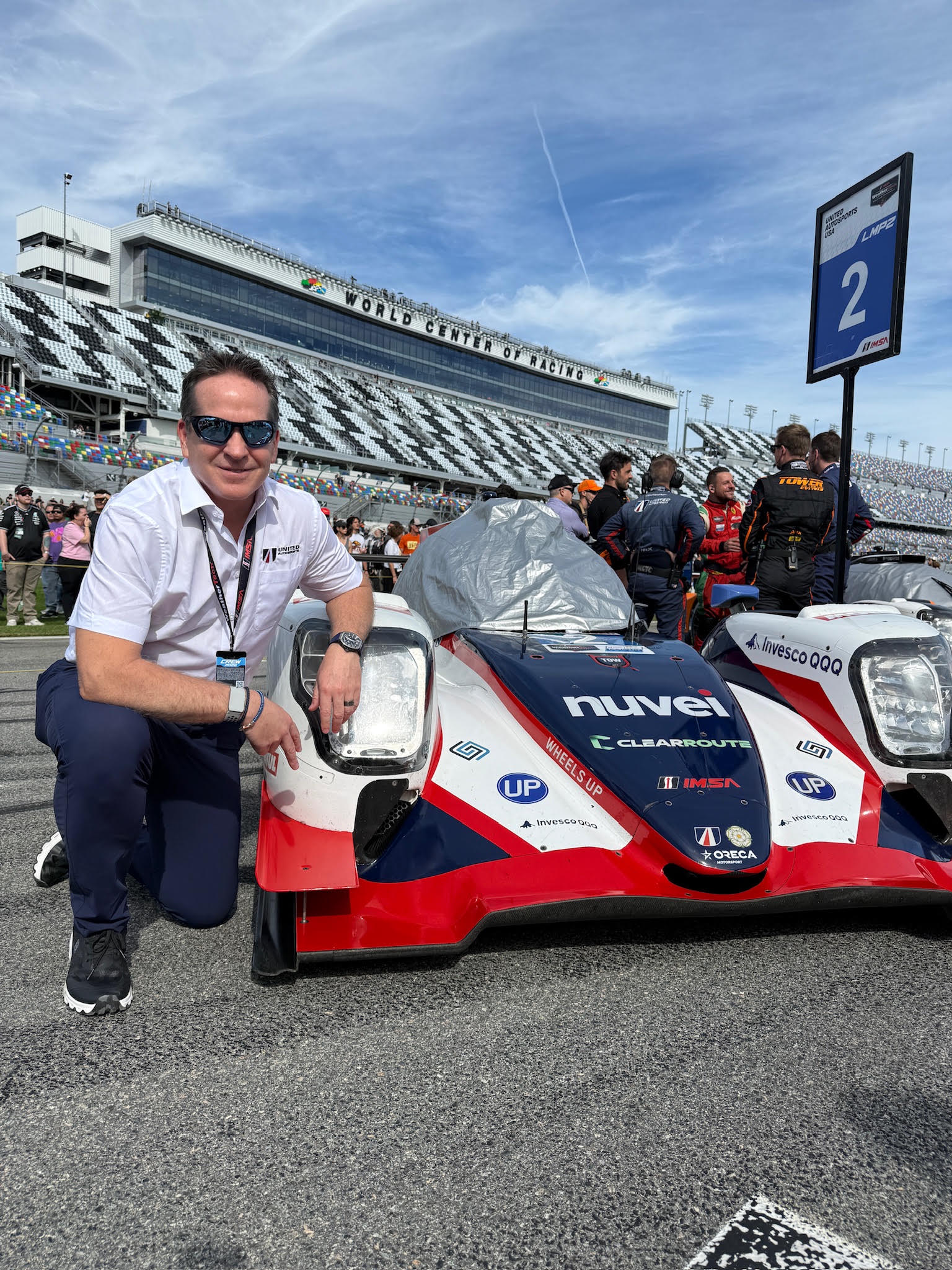

Keegan has also become known for his involvement in motorsports through investment in United Autosports and Andretti Extreme E Racing. His racing ventures have achieved significant victories at some of the world's most prestigious endurance events.

These achievements include three victories at the 24 Hours of Le Mans, as well as wins at the 24 Hours of Daytona, 12 Hours of Sebring, 6 Hours of Watkins Glen, and the Lone Star Le Mans. His teams have also secured championship-level results in both the European Le Mans Series and Asian Le Mans competition.

== Publications ==
His best-known works include The FUD Factor, which explores overcoming fear, uncertainty, and doubt in leadership. The book was reviewed by Kirkus Reviews. and was named a Wall Street Journal and Amazon Best Seller.

His second book published by Forbes Dare to Disrupt which serves as a playbook for transformational growth and also became an Amazon Best Seller. His third and most recent book published by Advantage Books Unbalanced on Purpose, distributed through Simon & Schuster. His broader body of thought leadership includes more than 400 published articles for major outlets such as Fast Company, Fortune, Entrepreneur, Inc., Newsweek, Harvard Business Review Maxim Magazine, Forbes Magazine and Rolling Stone Executive Council.

== Public speaking ==
Keegan is a sought after speaker on leadership, business transformation and hyper growth and has spoken at Reuters Energy Transition North America, Bloomberg New Energy Summit, Bain Capital Leadership Summit, London EV Show, CIBC Capital Markets events, and strategic forums hosted by over 50 colleges and universities to include Harvard University, Brown University, Dartmouth College, Northwestern University and Rensselaer Polytechnic Institute.

== Philanthropy ==
Keegan and his wife Dana founded the Keegan Family Courage & Faith Foundation. They have established the Barbara Keegan Arts Center, named after his mother, at St. Christopher's and the Keegan Leadership Center at the Bishop Guertin High School. Through the Keegan Family Courage & Faith Foundation, he and his family have contributed more than $10 million to youth academics and athletics.

Major beneficiaries include Saint Christopher Academy, Rensselaer Polytechnic Institute, Marymount University, and Bishop Guertin High School. RPI has named their football locker room after Keegan, and Bishop Guertin High School’s new athletics facility was named the Keegan Family Athletic Complex.

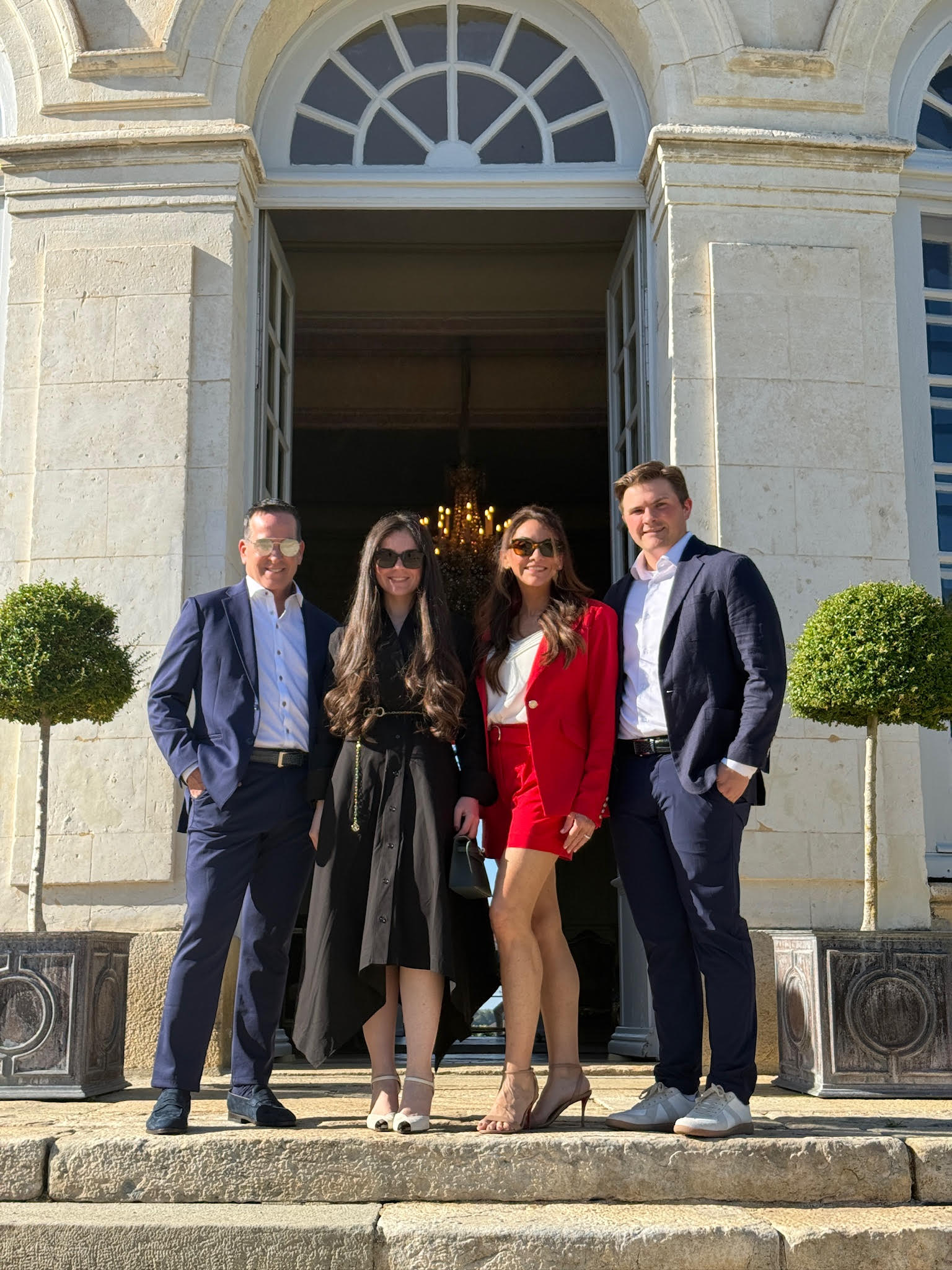
Keegan and his family – wife Dana, daughter Kaylie and son Patrick at their Family Charitable Foundation Event

== Personal life ==
He resides in the Greater Boston and New York City area with his wife Dana and their two young adult children Kaylie and Patrick.
