= Kashy Keegan =

British singer-songwriter (born 1983)

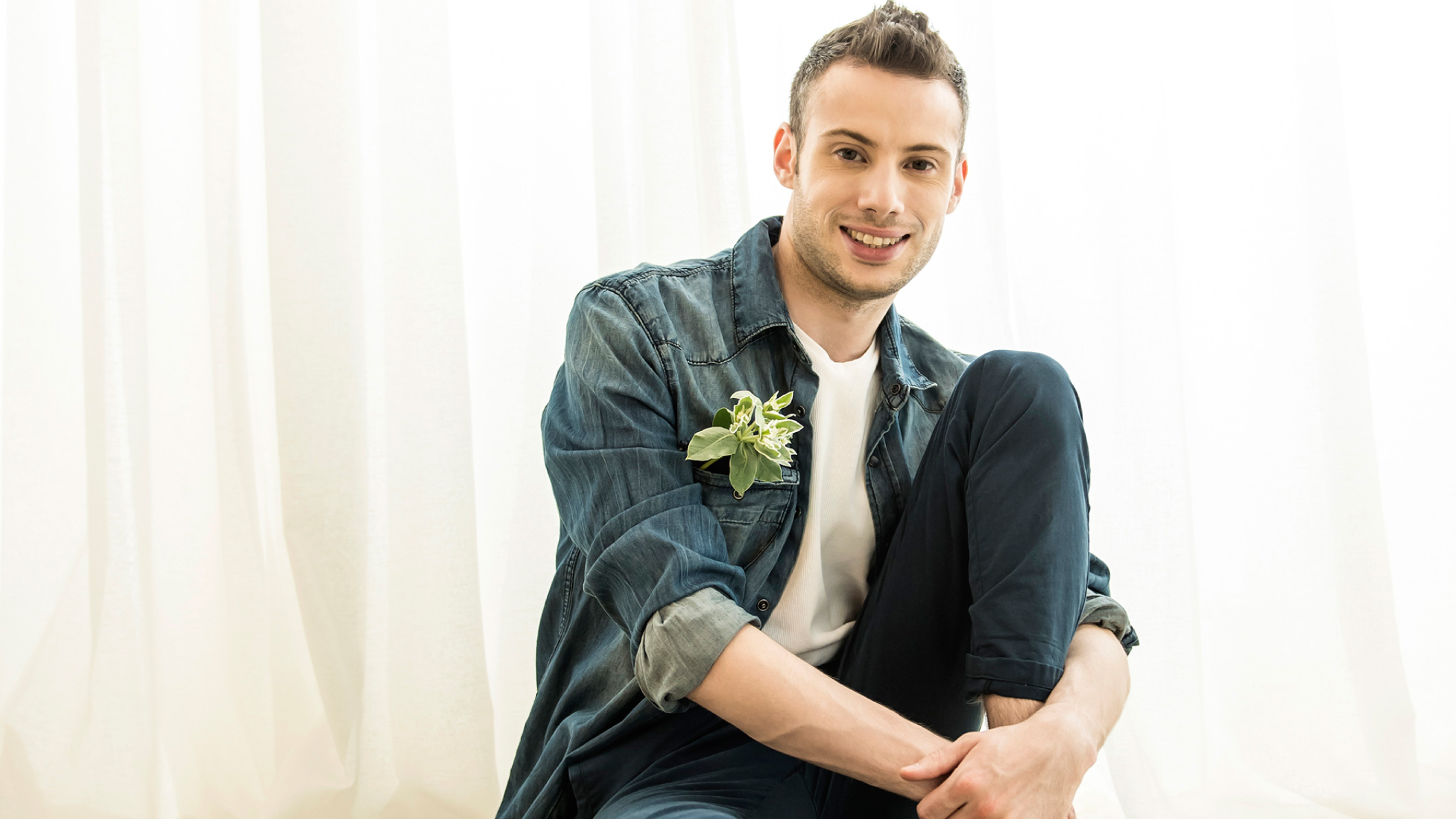

Background information
- Born: Matthew Kashy Keegan; 18 July 1983 (age 43); Worthing, England
- Genres: Pop
- Occupation: Singer-songwriter
- Instruments: Vocals; piano
- Years active: 2007–present
- Label: Evosound
- Website: www.kashykeegan.com

Kashy Keegan (born Matthew Kashy Keegan; 18 July 1983) is a British singer-songwriter. His song "This Is My Dream" has been described as an anthem for overcoming adversity.

== Life and career ==
=== Early life and career beginnings ===
Keegan was born Matthew Kashy Keegan in 1983 in Worthing, West Sussex, England. He started piano lessons at the age of seven, going on to write his first song at the age of 10. Keegan cites early classic pop music such as that by George Michael and Elton John as being some of his earliest musical influences. He said his favourite album is Tracy Chapman by Tracy Chapman because of its socially conscious lyrics. Prior to signing his first record deal in 2014, Keegan released two albums independently Kashy Keegan and Looking In.

=== 2012–2015: This Is My Dream ===
Keegan wrote "This Is My Dream" in 2007. The song was first used as a 2012 London Olympics motivational song and was later discovered by a music supervisor who works for Hong Kong Television (HKTV) after Keegan had uploaded the song to the website ReverbNation. Following this he was contacted by Universal Music who signed a one-song contract with him. HKTV chose the song as the theme music for a documentary series called The Challenge (Chinese: 挑戰). But this was before the network had been granted a broadcast license.

In October 2013, the news was announced that HKTV's application for a broadcast licence had been rejected. This triggered a series of public protests attended by tens of thousands of people for which Keegan's song became the unofficial soundtrack. Keegan flew to Hong Kong in support of HKTV and on 25 October 2013 an estimated audience of 30,000 watched him perform his song "This is My Dream". The following year Keegan flew to Beijing and competed in the MTV Asia Aloft Star competition where "This Is My Dream" came second overall.

In early 2014, he relocated from London to Hong Kong to pursue his music career full-time. He eventually signed to Hong Kong-based record label Evosound in May 2014 and released an album This Is My Dream on 1 December 2014.

=== 2016: Inner Song and first Mandarin song ===
18 March 2016 saw the release of Keegan's fourth studio album Inner Song. He wrote and produced each of the album's eleven songs.

In November 2016, Keegan released a version of his self-penned song "This Is My Dream" in Mandarin. Originally recorded in English, the Mandarin version took the title "堅守我的夢" and was released under his Chinese name 祈家恆 through Hong Kong record label Evosound. An official music video was posted on Keegan's VEVO channel. The release made Keegan one of the first British artists to ever release their own original song in Mandarin.

== Discography ==
=== Albums ===
- Kashy Keegan (2007)
- Looking In (2011)
- This Is My Dream (2014)
- Inner Song (2016)
- 堅守我的夢 (2016)
