= John Keegan (writer) =

Irish ballad writer

John Keegan (1809 or 1816–1849) was an Irish ballad-writer.

== Life ==
He was born in a small farmhouse on the banks of the Nore, Queen's County, and was educated by wandering hedge-schoolmasters. When very young he began to write verses, but lived a peasant's life. He suffered much in the Great Famine during 1845–6, and died in poor circumstances in 1849.

== Works ==
Many of Keegan's ballads appeared in Dolman's Magazine; some are contained in Edward Hayes's Ballads of Ireland, and in the compilation The Harp of Erin. At the time of his death Keegan was preparing a collected edition of his poems, which never, however, appeared.

Keegan wrote a version of The Red Beggar (An Brocach Rua) of Abbeyleix, a story from the local folklore of Abbeyleix, a small town in rural County Laois. It tells of a destitute traveller who came into the area; he gained his name the Red Badger (Bocough Ruadh), from a large red woollen nightcap which he wore day and night.
