= Tūhono =

Advocacy network for Māori people

Tūhono is an advocacy network for Māori groups and individuals within New Zealand.

As well as forming a network linking different iwi and hapū, Tūhono aims to promote cultural and spiritual wellbeing and benefit to the Māori community and also personal development and education. Tūhono is maintained as a charitable trust, established under the 1993 Electoral Act as a means for individual Māori to register their affiliation with iwi, in order to facilitate links and interaction between the iwi and their members. The Tūhono Central Web Service links with the New Zealand Electoral Commission database in association with the New Zealand Government, allowing for automatic notifications to the iwi when a member changes address.

The Māori word Tūhono means to link or connect.

Tūhono developed from a 1997 initiative by the Tautoko Māori Trust under Chairman Sir Paul Reeves. The Tūhono Trust was established in 2003 as kaitiaki (guardians) of Tūhono. By 2004 100,000 Māori had registered with Tūhono. The following year, the Tūhono website was launched, and by 2011, 120 iwi and affiliated groups were registered as Tūhono organisations and were able to link to their members.

The trust is based in Hamilton. Nine trustees are appointed by the country's various iwi, each one representing a different region. The chairperson and deputy chairperson are Anthony Olsen and Dr Te Taka Keegan respectively.
