= Paul Keegan =

Paul Keegan is the name of:

- Paul Keegan (footballer, born 1972), Irish football player
- Paul Keegan (footballer, born 1984), Irish football player (Doncaster Rovers)
