= Joe Keegan =

Joseph or Joe Keegan may refer to:

- Joseph Keegan (comedian), known as Joseph Elvin, (1862–1935), Cockney comedian and music hall entertainer
- Joseph M. Keegan (1922–2007), politician
