= Te Taka Keegan =

New Zealand academic and Māori language revivalist

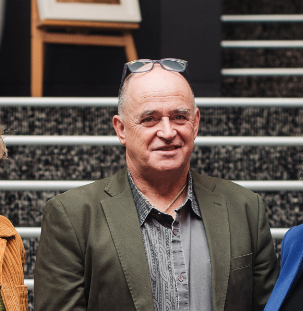

Academic background
- Education: University of Waikato
- Thesis: Indigenous Language Usage in a Digital Library: He Hautoa Kia Ora Tonu Ai. (2007)

Te Taka Adrian Gregory Keegan is a New Zealand academic and Māori language revivalist. He is descended from the Waikato-Maniapoto, Ngāti Apakura, Te Whānau-ā-Karuai ki Ngāti Porou and Ngāti Whakaaue iwi.

With a background in hardware engineering, Keegan returned to the University of Waikato to pursue a Master's degree in Traditional Māori Navigation. He then became involved in the computer science department and became the first to teach computer science in immersion te reo Māori He completed his PhD titled Indigenous Language Usage in a Digital Library: He Hautoa Kia Ora Tonu Ai based on work with the New Zealand Digital Library, a research project led by Ian H. Witten. His academic profile can be found at the Waikato University website.

Keegan led the team that translated Microsoft Windows XP and Microsoft Office 2003 into te reo Māori and consulted with the team that translated Office 2013 and Windows 8. The former involved coining many new terms, which have since been incorporated into A Dictionary of Māori Computer related terms. He was also involved in SwiftKey having Māori as a supported language.

In association with spending a sabbatical at Google, Keegan was the driving language force behind Google Māori. He is also one of the trustees of Tūhono, a database linking individual Māori with their iwi.

In November 2025 Keegan was appointed as a full professor at the University of Waikato, with the university noting that he was their first Māori Professor of Computer Science.

== Awards ==
In 2017, New Zealand Prime Minister Bill English presented Keegan with the nation's highest teaching award, the Prime Minister's Supreme Award, in recognition of Keegan's sustained commitment to teaching and learning.
