= Ray Keegan =

Australian rules footballer

Personal information
- Full name: Raymond George Keegan
- Born: 27 June 1923; Red Cliffs, Victoria
- Died: 12 July 2004 (aged 81); Coffs Harbour, New South Wales
- Original team: Preston Juniors
- Height: 183 cm (6 ft 0 in)
- Weight: 79.5 kg (175 lb)

Playing career^{1}
Years	Club	Games (Goals)
1947–48	Collingwood	16 (10)
1948–50	Prahran (VFA)	31 (11)
- ^{1} Playing statistics correct to the end of 1950.

Raymond George Keegan (27 June 1923 – 12 July 2004) was an Australian rules footballer who played with Collingwood in the Victorian Football League (VFL).
