= Betty Ann Keegan =

American politician

Betty Ann (née Southwick) Keegan (January 23, 1920 – April 16, 1974) was an American politician.

Born in Springfield, Illinois, she received her bachelor's degree from Rockford College and did graduate work from University of Wisconsin. She was active in the Democratic Party and lived in Rockford, Illinois. Keegan served in the 6th Illinois Constitutional Convention of 1969. In 1972, she was elected to the Illinois State Senate. Keegan died of cancer in Rockford, Illinois.
