= Ulva Belsham =

New Zealand telegraphist and volunteer radio operator

Ulva Belsham QSO
- Born: Ulva Lynn Bradshaw; 4 April 1921; The Neck, Stewart Island, New Zealand
- Died: 18 June 2011 (aged 90); New Zealand
- Resting place: Riverton Cemetery
- Known for: Radio operator for Marine Radio Service
- Spouse: Gordon Belsham (died 1978)

Ulva Lynn Belsham QSO (née Bradshaw; 4 April 1921 – 18 June 2011) was a telegraphist and volunteer radio operator for the Marine Radio Service in the southern part of the South Island of New Zealand.

== Biography ==
Belsham was born at The Neck, Stewart Island, and grew up in Bluff, in the south of New Zealand's South Island, with six siblings. Her parents were Joseph and Louisa (née Joss) Bradshaw. Her great-great-grandparents were Kohi Kohi Paatu of Centre Island and John Howell, an English settler and whaler. William Timaru Joss was her grandfather, a Stewart Island whaler and part of the first confirmed landing party on the continent of Antarctica, aboard the Antarctic in January 1895.

During World War II Belsham worked as a telegraphist at the Royal New Zealand Air Force base at Wigram Aerodrome in Christchurch. In 1946 she moved to Hinetui Point, Colac Bay and became a volunteer operator for the Marine Radio Service. She later moved to Riverton, where she volunteered at the Riverton Museum and worked to record and research Māori history, archives, and whakapapa. One of her projects was to transcribe and publish the birth, deaths and marriages register compiled by Rev. Johan Wohlers of the North German Mission Society at the Ruapuke Island Mission in Foveaux Strait. She returned to live in Bluff and Invercargill in her later years.

In the 1977 Queen's Silver Jubilee and Birthday Honours, Belsham was appointed a Companion of the Queen's Service Order for community service.

== Death and legacy ==
Belsham died in 2011. Her personal papers and research notebooks on waiata and vocabulary are held in the Hocken Collections in Dunedin and used for research into Māori language use in the province.

== Personal life ==
Belsham was married to Gordon Belsham (Tama Hika), who died in 1978.
