= List of Australian music television shows =

This is a list of Australian produced music television shows.

Early days of music television pre-dated video clips, and included variety style series, miming series, and pop series, and with the advent of music videos, shows gave way to slickly prepackaged film clips with a host compère mixing live local acts (e.g. Countdown). The most recent trend has been towards near and complete compère-free shows which show music videos exclusively (e.g. Rage and AMV).

Talent quests and competitions are shown in the second table below.

== Music television ==
Title	Period	Network/ channel	Presenter(s)	Notes
Accent on Strings	1956	TCN-9	?	Sydney only. Piano and string recitals. Series debuted during the first official day of programming on station TCN-9
Campfire Favourites	1956	TCN-9	Frank Ifield	Sydney only
The Isador Goodman Show	1956–1957	HSV-7	Isador Goodman	Consisted of Isador Goodman playing the piano in a 15-minute time-slot.
Billabong Band	1957	ABV-2	?	A live program which ran for a short series of four episodes. It featured Australian folk songs, but little else is known about the series. Broadcast in Melbourne. At least one of the episodes survives as a kinescope recording.
Blues, Studio One	1957	HSV-7	Joan Bilceaux and her Quintet.	Joan Bilceaux was a jazz singer. This short-lived series aired live in a 15-minute time-slot. Replaced on the schedule with first Australian-produced sitcom Take That
Neptune Presents	1957	GTV-9	?	Melbourne only, this was a weekly 5-minute series featuring vocalists.
Rhythm Roundup	1957–1960	ATN-7	Roy Hampson	Exact format is unknown. Hampson, a disc jockey, also hosted Record Roundup during the late-1950s.
Teenage Mailbag	1957–	HSV7	Ernie Sigley, Heather Horwood and Gaynor Bunning	Melbourne; Cast sang requested songs
Hillbilly Requests	1957–1958	GTV-9	Tom Campbell	Episodes starred the Victoria Banjo Club
The Hit Parade	1957–1959 ?	HSV7	John Eden (3DB)	Melbourne.
Juke Box Saturday Night	1957–1958	GTV-9	Bob Horsfall	Replaced with The Astor Show in early 1958
Choice of the People	1957–1958	ATN-7	Milton Saunders	The series presented songs requested by viewers. Milton Saunders was a pianist and played the requests on the piano.
Melody Time	1957–1959	ABV-2	Ormonde Douglas	Professional musicians performed live
TV Disc Jockey	1957–1958	TCN9	John Godson	Sydney only
Accent on Youth	1958	TCN-9	John Godson, quickly replaced with Brian Henderson (?)	This was the follow-up to TV Disc Jockey. There is conflicting information as to when the series debuted and who was the host. The format consisted of teenagers dancing to records, while there was also guest vocalists. It later became Bandstand.
Ardath Hit Parade	1958–1959	ATN-7	Keith Walshe (1958), Jimmy Parkinson (1959)	A different series to the Melbourne "Hit Parade", this series featured the top 10 hits of the week. There were guest singers and groups from time to time. It was a spin-off from the variety series Sydney Tonight.
The Astor Show	1958	GTV-9		
Country Style	1958	ABC	?	Aired in Sydney and Melbourne, this was a live variety series with emphasis on country and western music. Frank Ifield appeared and sang in several episodes.
Eunice Gardiner Presents	1958	TCN-9	Eunice Gardiner	Sydney only. Eunice Gardiner played selections on the piano, and also interviewed personalities in the field of music. After several months it was replaced on the schedule with Music for You.
Melody with Milton	1958–1960	ATN-7	Milton Saunders	Milton Saunders was a pianist. Daytime series in Sydney only.
Music for You	1958–1960	TCN-9	Isador Goodman	Sydney only. Goodman was a pianist.
The Toppanos	1958–1958	ATN-7	Enzo and Peggy Toppano	Live music and ad-libbed comedy
Valerie Cooney Sings	1958	ABN-2	Valerie Cooney and the Jack Allan Trio	Replaced on the schedule by Vic Sabrino Sings
Vic Sabrino Sings	1958	ABN-2	Vic Sabrino	Sabrino's real name was George Assang, and he was a singer. At the time, ABN-2 was not a 24-hour station (and usually signed off each night between 10:30 pm and 11:30 pm), and Vic Sabrino Sings was used as the final program of the programming day for several weeks. Like many ABC series of the 1950s, it aired for a much shorter season than shows on commercial television.
Your Hit Parade	?	?		Brisbane
Club Seven	?	Seven		Brisbane
In Time	?	?		Adelaide
At Your Request	1958–1959	HSV-7	Charles Skase	"Requested songs". Information on this series is scarce. Charles Skase was a baritone.
Bandstand	1958–1972	Nine Network	Brian Henderson	
Cool Cats Show	1958–1960	HSV-7	Don Bennetts	Aimed at teenagers. The Ted Vining Trio were regulars.
Australian All Star Jazz Band	1959	ABC	?	Variety series with emphasis on jazz music. The band consisted of Terry Wilkinson, Freddy Logan, Ron Webber, Dave Rutledge and Don Burrows.
The Bert Newton Show	1959–1960	GTV 9	Bert Newton	Became Hi-Fi Club in 1960. Artists lip-synced their songs.
The Jimmy Parkinson Show	1959–1960	ATN-7	Jimmy Parkinson	A music series starring singer Jimmy Parkinson.
Johnny Gredula Sings	1959–1960	ATN-7	Johnny Gredula	Johnny Gredula sang requested songs in this series.
Make Ours Music	1959–1961	ABC		Included music performances and dancing. Produced by James Upshaw
Patrick O'Hagan Sings	1959	ATN-7 and GTV-9	Patrick O'Hagan	Irish tenor sang songs in a 15-minute time-slot during daytime
Serenade	1959–1960	ATN-7	Ray Melton (1959–1960), Peggy Brooks (1960)	A half-hour music series starring singer Ray Melton, but some episodes instead featured singer Peggy Brooks.
Sweet and Low	1959	ABV-2	Bob Walters	Jazz music
Teen Time	1959–1961	ATN-7	Keith Walshe and Carol Finlayson	Sydney only. Teen Time started on ATN Channel 7, Sydney at about the same time as Bandstand on Channel 9 and was a mix of live performance and records. It was hosted by Keith Walshe and Carol Finlayson and had a live audience. It went to air initially for a half hour only Monday – Friday at 5:30 – 6 pm. After several months the time was changed to 5.30 – 6.30, 2 nights a week – Tuesdays and Fridays. The Tuesday permanent band was headed by Dig Richards and on Fridays, Warren Williams. Bob Malcolm appeared on a regular basis to teach rock and roll steps.
Six O'Clock Rock	1959–1962	ABC	Johnny O'Keefe, & others	
Words and Music	1959–1960	ATN-7	Milton Saunders and Colin Croft	Sydney only. Milton Saunders was a pianist.
Youth Show	1959–1960	ATN-7	Keith Walshe	Sydney only. A music series, with a focus on teenage talent, particularly artists who had not yet reached stardom.
Bongo	1960	GTV-9	Russell Stubbings	Melbourne only. The actual format is not known. It aired live and was aimed at teenagers.
The John Konrads Show	1960–1961	TCN-9, HSV-7	John Konrads	A music series aimed at teenagers, with singers, dancers and musicians.
The Lorrae Desmond Show	1960–1964	ABC	Lorrae Desmond, & others	Episodes consisted of music performances, and dance production numbers.
Tea for Two	1960	HSV-7	Jocelyn Terry	A daytime music series featuring singer Guido Lorraine.
The Johnny O'Keefe Show / Sing, Sing, Sing	1961–1962; 1962–1965	Seven Network	Johnny O'Keefe	
The Bryan Davies Show	1962–1963	ABC	Bryan Davies	
Trad Jazz	1962–1963	Seven Network	Graeme Bell	Re-titled "Just Jazz" in 1963
Saturday Date	1963–1967	TCN-9	Jimmy Hannan, later Tony Murphy	Aimed at teenagers.
Jazz Meets Folk	1964	ABC	Alan Dean	
Teen Scene	1964–1965	ABC	Johnny Chester	
The Go!! Show	1964–1967	ATV-0	Alan Field, Ian Turpie, Johnny Young	Melbourne only
Kommotion	1964–67	ATV-0	Ken Sparkes	Monday to Friday at 5:30 pm.
Commonwealth Jazz Club	1965	ABC		Six-part miniseries with the UK and Canada. The two Australian half-hours featured Graeme Bell and his All Stars, as well as the Don Burrows Quartet with Judy Bailey (piano)
Club Seventeen	1965?–1969?	TVW-7	Gary Carvolth, Johnny Young	aka 7-Teen. Perth.
It's All Happening	1966	Seven Network	Billy Thorpe	Sydney.
Dig We Must	1966	ABC	Bobby & Laurie	Previously named It's A Gas.
Uptight	1967–1969	ATV-0 (O-Ten)	Ross D. Wyllie	8 am to noon Saturday mornings.
Where The Action Is	1967	TEN-10	Johnny O'Keefe	Sydney.
Start Living	1967	ABC	Judy Jacques and Idris Jones	
GTK (Get To Know)	1969–1975	ABC		10-minute show at 6:30 pm weeknights/
Hit Scene	1969–1972	ABC	Dick Williams	Live music acts in studio performances with music clips and interviews.
Sounds Like Us	1969–1970	ABC	Jeff Phillips	
Happening '70 (also '71, '72)	1970–1972	ATV-0 (O-Ten)	Ross D. Wyllie	
Now Sound	1970	GTV-9	Ronnie Burns	Age – Green Guide – 6 June 1970 – 30 Minutes, prior to Bandstand at 5:00 pm
Sounds Unlimited / Sounds	1974–1987	Seven Network	Donnie Sutherland	
Countdown	1974–1987	ABC	Ian "Molly" Meldrum, various guest hosts	Initially on Friday evenings, later Sunday evenings at 6 pm with a repeat on following Saturday.
Bandstand 76 (#2)	1976	Nine Network	Daryl Somers	Saturdays 7pm later changed to 8pm
Target	1976	ABC	various	magazine type program which included music, week nights at 5:45pm
Funky Road	1976	ABC	Stephen McLean Bernie Cannon Albie Thoms	Started 24 February 1976 as a rebadged GTK which moved to a weekday 10:30 slot 30min program
Flashez	1976–1977	ABC	Ray Burgess	Mon–Fri 4:30 pm magazine style incl music
Right On	1977–1978	Network Ten	Kobe Steele (1977–1978) Alan Steele (1978)	Mon–Fri 4pm Videos and interviews. Replayed Saturday mornings.
The Real Thing	1977–1978	ABC	Ron E. Sparx	
Nightmoves	1977–1986	Seven, and later Ten	Lee Simon	Channel 7 1977–83, Channel 10 1984–1986
Music Express	1975–1986		Sandy Roberts / SteveCurtis [later joined by Steve Whitham] / Greg Clark & Di Stapleton	In South Australia ADS7 4–6 pm Saturdays and on relay to SES 8, RTS5a and BKN7.
Studio One	1980–1983	BTQ-7		7 Brisbane had this local program, because Sounds ex ATN-7 Sydney was screened on QTQ-9 Brisbane.
VideoDisc	1981–1982	ABC		5 minute music video clip prior to 7 pm news
Rock Arena	1982–1989	ABC	Peter Holland (1982)?, Andrew Peters (1982–83), Glenn Shorrock (January – June 1984) Suzanne Dowling (July 1984 – 1989)	Originally concerts as per Nightshift, 1st episode (February 1982) was a concert of The Kinks 1979. Later in 1982 started showing clips and by 1984 recorded live studio performances as well.
Wrok	1982	Network Ten		5 pm – 5:30 pm Mon–Fri
Countdown Friday	1982	ABC		Clip show with voiceover from John Peters, Approximately 22 episodes July to December.
Breezin	1981–1984	Bendigo BCV8	John Hurst and Glenn Ridge	Friday nights around 10 pm for 1 hour
After Dark	1982–1983	Seven Network	Donnie Sutherland, Glenn A. Baker	Saturday nights late usually 11.30pm or 12.00am at Epping Studios in Sydney. Music videos, music news and rock music interviews with both local and international pop/rock acts.
Rock Around the World	1982–1985	SBS	Basia Bonkowski	Mondays–Thursdays 6–6:30pm, Friday 1 hour at approx 11 pm
Take 5/Take V	1983–1984	ABC		5 minute clip prior to 7 pm news, replaced Videodisc
Countdown Flipside	1983	ABC	Request show hosted by John Peters	
Clipz	1983–1987	QTQ9 Brisbane		Brisbane only
Music Video	1983–1987	Network Ten	John Torv 1983–85, Basia Bonkowski 1985–87	One of the earliest all night music programs before Rage which consistently showed music clips along with interviews and reviews. Was cut in early 1987 when Video Hits started.
Saturday Juke Box	1983–1988?	BTQ-7		Brisbane only, replaced Studio One
Trax	1984?–1989?	Channel 7 –1986, Channel 10 1987–?	Andrew Peters, SAFM DJ's	Clip show in Sth Aust and WA only
Wavelength	1984	Nine	Jono & Dano (Jonathan Coleman & Ian Rogerson)	Half hour music video clip show 5:00 pm Mon–Fri
Continental Drift	1984	SBS	Basia Bonkowski	Saturday 6–6:30 pm
Freeze Frame	1984	SBS	Geeling	Friday 6–6:30pm covered music, fashion and comedy
Antenna	1984–1985	ABC		Sunday morning 10–10:30, music clips, lifestyle and reviews
Tracks	1984?–1988?	TVT-6 Hobart / Tas TV	Tony Fox	Clip show in Tasmania only
Night Shift	1985	Ch7		Shown in Adelaide
Simulrock	1985		Andrew Peters	Shown in Adelaide in conjunction with SAFM
Top 40 Video	1985–1989			Adelaide, 3 hour show playing the Top 40 clips
Kulture Shock	1985	SBS	Tony Hughes, Oriana Panozzo, Geeling	
The Noise	1986–1992	SBS	Annette Shun Wah	
nomad	1993–1994	SBS	Unhosted	
SevenRock	1985?–1987?	BTQ-7	Bill Riner, BBQ Bob Gallagher	Late Friday evenings – Brisbane only, six week summer simulcast with FM104 which was so popular it lasted over 6 years
Beatbox	1985–1988	ABC		Saturday morning – replaced by The Factory
Rockit	1985	Ch 9	Lee Simon	
Between The Teeth	September 1986 – September 1987	ABC	Paul Schluter, Emma Honey	Saturday morning 10–11 am, produced in 1 Davey St Studios, Hobart, Tasmania. Producer Richard Reisz, Script John Muirhead, Director Ron McCollough, Sound Alvin de Quincey, Andrew Ross, Voice Neil Grant. Video hits show largely experimental in approach with comperes frequently acting out skits that linked one video clip to another. Tried to break stereotypical approach of most compered shows. Filmed on location and studio. Included top ten summaries from UK, USA and Australia. Included a flashback and alternative hit.
Video Hits	1987–2011	Network Ten	Kelly Cavuoto (2004), Axle Whitehead (2004–2006), Faustina "Fuzzy" Agolley (2006–2011), Nathan Sapsford (2007–2008), Hayden Guppy (2009), Dylan Lewis (2010–2011)	Saturday and Sunday mornings
Off The Record	1987?–1989?	Ballarat BTV6	Glenn Ridge	Saturday mornings 10:30–12:00
rage	1987–current	ABC	Friday show is generally compère-free. Saturday show has numerous guest presenters	Friday and Saturday nights (late) until early morning
Nightshift	1986–1989	Network Ten	David White and Sue Moses	Friday and Saturday nights approx 12 am – 6 am
MTV	1987–1992?	Nine Network	Richard Wilkins	late night show, later moved to pay-TV
The Factory	1987–1989	ABC	Andrew Daddo and Alex Papps	Saturday morning
Countdown Revolution	1989–1990	ABC	Tania Lacy, Mark Little	
Video Smash Hits	1990–1996?	Seven Network	Michael Horrocks, Emily Symons and Kym Wilson	Saturday mornings. Ran opposite Ten's Video Hits
Racket	1991–92	ABC	Toby Creswell, James Valentine and Stephanie Lewis	Friday nights before Rage
Take 40 Australia	1993–2009	Network Ten/2Day FM	Eden Gaha, Andrew G	produced in association with the syndicated radio program of the same name.
Underground Rockit	1993–1994	MCT31 & Optus Vision	Uccella Tilbrook	10.30 pm Thursdays Australian Rock & Pop.
The Drum	1993	Channel V Australia (on Foxtel)	Ian "Molly" Meldrum	Revived on Fox-8 in 2002.
Wired Music TV	1994–1996	MCT 31 & Optus Vision	Uccella Tilbrook	10.30 pm Thursdays Australian Rock & Pop.
Turn It Up (Rhythm NATion)	1994–1996	Australia Television Channel 31 Optus Vision	Paul Fidler	1995 – Beamed to over 40 countries globally, Back in production January 2009
Big Music Soup	1994	Tas TV	Paul Franklin, Filthy Fi	Saturday mornings. Clip show in Tasmania only.
MC Tee Vee	early to mid 1990s	SBS	Annette Shun Wah	Mainly dance, house and hip hop tracks.
Recovery	1996–2000	ABC	Dylan Lewis, Jane Gazzo	Saturday mornings from 9:00 am to noon
Alchemy	1998–2001	SBS	Frank Rodi, Robbie Buck, Nicole Fossati	Friday nights from 10:55 pm
Ground Zero	1998–1999?	Network Ten	Penne Dennison, Jade Gatt, Ugly Phil O'Neil, Jackie O	
The 10:30 Slot	1999–2000	ABC	Dylan Lewis, Angus Sampson	
Studio 22	1999–2003	ABC	Clinton Walker, Annette Shun Wah	Live performances of artists from Australia and overseas
The House Of Hits	2000	Network Ten	Leah McLeod, Ian Meldrum	Saturdays, 6:30 pm.
AMV	2000–2002 (Seven Network), 2000–present (Seven Local TV)	Seven Network		7 am to 9 am weekday mornings
So Fresh TV	2003–2006	Nine Network	David Campbell and Elysia Platt	Saturday Mornings.
Underground Sounds	2004–current?	C31	Shane McNamara and Kelli Mcdonald	Saturday Nights
Eclipse Music TV	2005–2009	Seven Network	Lizzy Lovette (2005–2007); James Tobin; Virginia Lette (2008–2009)	Saturday afternoon
Eclipse Music TV	2010–2013	GO!	Suze Raymond (2010); Shura Taft (2011–2013); Zoe Balbi (2011–2013)	Saturday afternoon
1700	2006–current	C31 Melbourne & Geelong	Various	Weekdays 5:00 pm – 6:00 pm. Online only from July 2017. Produced by SYN TV
jtv	2006–current	ABC	Rosie Beaton and various other Triple J presenters	Friday nights, weekend mornings
The Music Jungle	2007–2008	Nine Network	Asha Kuerten (2007), Angela Johnson (2008), Lizzy Lovette (2008)	Saturday Mornings.
The ARIA Music Show	2009	Nine Network / GO!		Monday to Friday late night
MTV Hits Weekly Hot30 Countdown	2010–current	MTV Hits Australia/Today Network (2010–present)	Erin McNaught (2010–present), Matty Acton (2010–present)	Every Sunday, 6:00 pm – 8:30 pm
The Hit Rater.com	2010–current?	Southern Cross TV		Every Sunday, 8:30–9 am
The Loop	2012–2020	10 Peach	Scott Tweedie, Liv Phyland and Ash London	Saturday Mornings, 9 am – 11:30 am
Volumz	2011–current	NITV/SBS	Alec Doomadgee	
Fusion with Casey Donovan	2012–current	NITV/SBS	Casey Donovan	
SBS PopAsia	2011–2018	SBS	Jamaica dela Cruz and PopAgent JayK and Andy Trieu	Every Sunday, 8:30–10:30 am, Every Monday, 5 pm–5:30 pm
Jukebox Saturday Night	2009–current	Aurora Community Channel	Ken Sparkes Justin Coombes-Pearce	Focuses on music videos from the 1950s to 1980s. Airs Saturdays at 7:30 pm, Sundays at 1:30 pm and 10 pm and Thursdays at 9:30 pm.
The Set	2018–2019	ABC (Australian TV channel)	Linda Marigliano and Dylan Alcott	Wednesday nights, 9:30 pm

== Music-oriented talent quests/shows ==
Talent quest shows have been popular throughout Australia's television broadcasting history. A typical format is a selection of unknown singers or musicians (as opposed to established recording artists) performing before a panel of judges who award points with the winner receiving a cash prize or a recording contract. More recent incarnations have had the heats and eliminations running over several months with public votes included (e.g. Australian Idol).

Young Talent Time was one of Australia's longest running talent quest shows (1971–1988) and included a mix of regular in-house performers with a weekly talent competition.

Name	Period	Network/ channel	Presenter/s	Notes
Stairway to the Stars	1956–1958	HSV-7	Eric Pearce (1956), Geoff McComas	Aired in Melbourne only, this may have been the first talent show produced for Australian television, having debuted 9 November 1956. While not specifically focused on music, most of the contestants were either singers or instrumentalists. It ran for about 2 years, and it is not known if any footage survives of the series, given the wiping of the era.
Australia's Amateur Hour	1957–1958	TCN-9 and HSV-7	Terry Dear	Based on a long-running radio series. Unlike most Australian series of the 1950s, this series was not live. Rather, it was kinescoped in advance so it could be shown in both Sydney and Melbourne.
TV Stars of Tomorrow – Tarax Show segment	1958?	Nine Network		Kids talent segment, included Denise Drysdale, Wendy Stapleton, Marty Rhone
New Faces	1963–1985	Nine Network	Frank Wilson (1963–1976), Bert Newton (1976–1985)	Originally titled Kevin Dennis Auditions, renamed New Faces in 1968
Young Talent Time	1971–1988, 2012	Network Ten	Johnny Young (1971–1988); Rob Mills (2012)	Mainly focussed on young teens. Notable for establishing performers such as Tina Arena, Jamie Redfern, Kylie Minogue, Dannii Minogue, and Debra Byrne.
Pot of Gold	1975–1978	Network Ten	Tommy Hanlon Jr.	Bernard King was a regular judge.
Quest	1976–1978	ABC TV	Peter Regan	Also known as Quest '76, Quest '77, and Quest '78
Tasmanian New Faces	1979?–1981?	TNT-9 Launceston	Jim Cox	Tasmanian talent show based on New Faces
Pot Luck	1987	Network Ten	Ernie Sigley	Based on Pot Of Gold. Competitors included Kym Wilson
Bert's New Faces	1992–1993	Network Ten	Bert Newton	
Popstars	2000–2002	Seven Network	Luke Jacobz	Tuesday 7:30 pm to 9:30 pm
Australian Idol	2003–2009, 2023–present	Network Ten 2003–2009; Seven Network 2023–present	Andrew G, James Mathison 2003–2009; Ricki-Lee Coulter & Scott Tweedie 2023–present	Sunday 7:30 pm (performances) & Monday 7:30 (elimination); Late Winter – Late Spring (Annual season) 2003–2009
Popstars Live	2004	Seven Network	Luke Jacobz	Sunday 7:30 pm (performances) & Monday 7:30 (elimination)
The X Factor	2005, 2010–2016	Network Ten (2005); Seven Network (2010–2016)	Daniel Macpherson (2005), Luke Jacobz (2010–2015), Jason Dundas (2016)	Sunday 7:30 pm (performances) & Monday 7:30 (elimination)
The Voice	2012–present	Nine Network (2012–2020) Seven Network (2021–)	Darren McMullen (2012–15) Sonia Kruger (2015–2019) Sonia Kruger (2021–)	Sunday 7:00 pm (performances and elimination)
The Masked Singer	2019–present	Network 10	Osher Günsberg	Monday & Tuesday 7:00 pm (performances and elimination)

== See also ==
- Music of Australia
- List of Australian television series

Beat Club was a series of 30-minute episodes which aired on SBS during 1986 each Wednesday at 6 pm. It showed video clips from the 1960s German TV music show of the same name. It was presented by Annette Shun Wah with expert commentary by Glenn A Baker. The Noise replaced this series, which Annette presented solo.
