= The ARIA Music Show =

- Genre: Music television
- Country of origin: Australia
- Original language: English
- No. of seasons: 1

Production
- Running time: 60 mins (inc. ads)

Original release
- Network: Nine Network; GO!
- Release: 10 August 2009

The ARIA Music Show is an Australian music television program that began airing on Go! from 10 August 2009. A version of the program also airs on the Nine Network.

The program consists of music videos presented without a host, similar to rage. Initially it was broadcast overnight between the end and beginning of daily scheduled programming on the channel, but this scheduling has since been phased out. Go! have suggested that a "more substantial" version of the show will develop as the channel evolves.

== See also ==
- List of Australian music television shows
