= It's All Happening =

It's All Happening may refer to:

- It's All Happening (film), a 1963 British musical film
- It's All Happening (album), by Iwrestledabearonce (2009)
- It's All Happening (TV series), Australian TV series
