= AMV (TV program) =

- Also known as: AMV (All Music Video)
- Genre: Music
- Country of origin: Australia
- Original language: English
- No. of seasons: 3

Production
- Running time: 1.5 hours

Original release
- Network: Seven Network
- Release: 2000 – February 2002

AMV (All Music Video) is a music video show broadcast by the Seven Network between 2000 and 2002. It aired between 7.30 am and 9 am every weekday, following the 90 minute-long Sunrise news bulletin. It was cancelled in February 2002 when Sunrise expanded into a three-hour-long (later three-and-a-half-hour) format.

AMV was similar to the long-running ABC1 music show rage in that it featured no host, and Network Ten's Video Hits in that it aired a combination of new and popular clips. However, due to the early morning timeslot (which competed against children's programming such as Cheez TV), content was often censored; for example upon broadcasting the video for Robbie Williams' "Rock DJ", the ending was not shown.

== See also ==
- List of Australian music television shows
