= Choice of the People =

1957 Australian TV series

- Genre: Music television
- Presented by: Milton Saunders
- Country of origin: Australia
- Original language: English

Original release
- Network: ATN-7
- Release: 25 November 1957 – 3 October 1958

Choice of the People is an Australian daytime television series which aired on Sydney television station ATN-7 from 25 November 1957 to 3 October 1958. It was replaced on the schedule by Melody with Milton (1958–1960), which featured the same host.

Broadcast at 2:00 p.m. on several weekdays each week, the series was hosted by Milton Saunders and featured music requested by viewers with Saunders playing requested songs on the piano and organ. The series was an early example of daytime television in Australia. On the Friday that the final episode aired, the broadcasting day of the station began at 1:30 p.m. with U.S. comedy series The Ray Milland Show. By comparison, TCN-9 offered only the audio of music during that time of the day, with their first program on the day's schedule not airing until 5:00PM.

It is not known if any of the episodes are still extant, and it is possible (though not confirmed) that the series may be lost.
