= Tommy Duncan =

American singer-songwriter (1911–1967)

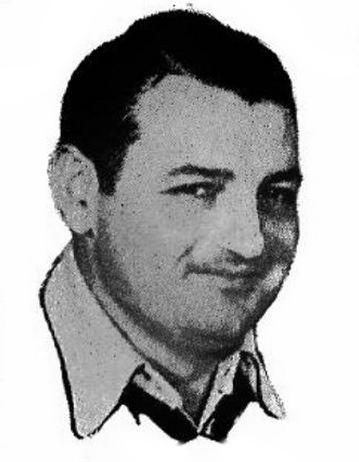

Background information
- Born: Thomas Elmer Duncan; January 11, 1911; Whitney, Texas, U.S.
- Died: July 25, 1967 (aged 56)
- Genres: Western swing
- Occupation: Singer-songwriter
- Years active: 1930s–1960s
- Label: Capitol
- Formerly of: Bob Wills

Thomas Elmer Duncan (January 11, 1911 – July 25, 1967) was an American Western swing vocalist and songwriter who gained fame in the 1930s as a founding member of The Texas Playboys. He recorded and toured with bandleader Bob Wills on and off into the early 1960s.

== Biography ==
=== Early life ===
Duncan was born in Whitney, Texas, United States, on a large farm into a large and impoverished family of truck farmers. His father, Thomas Edwin Duncan, and mother, Maylene Pearl Bounds, were both amateur musicians and the family often played and sang together. He was one of 14 children. His most profound influences as a young singer were Jimmie Rodgers, Bing Crosby, Emmett Miller, and other country and blues musicians. Later in life, Duncan and Crosby became good friends and had their horses stalled next to each other.

Thomas moved the family to Raymondville, Texas, when Tommy was 13; not wanting to move, he stayed behind to sharecrop on a cousin's farm, and by 1932, was surviving as a busker in Fort Worth singing at a root beer stand. That year, he won an audition against 64 other singers to join the Light Crust Doughboys, a popular local band, which featured Bob Wills on fiddle. Duncan was hired after he sang a version of Emmett Miller's "I Ain't Got Nobody" and impressed Wills with his yodeling ability and bluesy phrasing. As was common at the time, the Doughboys appeared on a radio show under the sponsorship of a local business, in their case Light Crust Flour. Duncan quickly became a sensation, both on the show and at dances and other appearances.

=== Bob Wills and The Texas Playboys ===
When bandleader Wills decided to form an independent band, Duncan and he became the creative core of The Texas Playboys. Duncan was versatile in his singing style and repertoire, was credited with a fine voice and range, and was ideal for the kind of dance music Wills performed and recorded. He sang everything from ballads and folk to pop, Tin Pan Alley, Broadway, blues, and cowboy songs.

As a lyricist, he contributed to "New San Antonio Rose" (1940); the recording, with Duncan on vocals, sold three million copies for Columbia Records. Duncan married, but after only a few years, his wife developed cancer and died. Ironically, Duncan's first royalty check for "Time Changes Everything" was used to cover her funeral expenses. Duncan soon set the standard for Western swing vocals. In California, he became friends with Bing Crosby when they stabled their horses together. A virtual "human jukebox", Duncan memorized the lyrics and melodies to more than 3,000 songs. He was a master stylist with the ability to make each song sound as though he wrote it. Duncan could also play piano, guitar, and bass.

After a decade of musical success, Duncan was the first member of Wills's band to volunteer for the armed services after the bombing of Pearl Harbor. His service lasted less than a year when he received a medical discharge, and he rejoined Wills in 1944 as the war neared its end.

He appeared with Wills and the other Playboys in several movies, including Bob Wills and His Texas Playboys (1944), Rhythm Roundup (1945), Blazing the Western Trail (1945), Lawless Empire (1945), and Frontier Frolic (1946). His voice matured in the middle to late 1940s. Duncan joined Wills in writing several more numbers, including "New Spanish Two Step" (1945) and "Stay a Little Longer" (1945), as well as recording old-time standards such as "Cotton-Eyed Joe" (1946) and "Sally Goodin" (1947). One night in a bar visiting with songwriter Cindy Walker, Duncan motioned for her to look at a gentleman sitting just a few tables away- who was staring at his glass of beer. Duncan commented to her that he's just "watchin' the bubbles in his beer." Instantly- they both realized they had a song idea and "Bubbles in My Beer" became one of the staples of Western swing songs. Aside from "Faded Love", sung by Rusty McDonald, every Texas Playboys record that was a hit featured Duncan on vocals, cementing his status as the finest vocalist Wills had.

Rumors about Duncan having been a heavy drinker were false; Duncan would only have a drink or two at social events and his brother Glynn stated that otherwise he never saw Duncan drink even while they lived together in Fresno, California. Many band members considered him a troublemaker, but the accusations may have stemmed from professional jealousy. Duncan was admired by contemporaries, including Tex Ritter, Tex Williams, Teddy Wilds, Hank Penny, and Ole Rasmussen.

=== Later career ===
By 1948, Wills's drinking was becoming too out of control for Duncan. Wills often missed shows, and when the headliner failed to appear, the band's pay reverted to union scale. After a string of performances in 1948 without Wills, Wills overheard Duncan complaining one night before a performance. Wills told guitarist Eldon Shamblin to "fire" Duncan, who set out to form his own band.

He organized another Western swing band called Tommy Duncan and His Western All Stars, featuring his younger brother Glynn (1921–2013), a Western swing pioneer, on bass (who later became Wills's lead vocalist in the late 1950s). Another brother, Joe Duncan, was the lead vocalist for Johnnie Lee Wills's band for a period of time. At the height of the band's popularity, Duncan and the band made an appearance in the 1949 Western film, South of Death Valley, starring Charles Starrett and Smiley Burnette. Musical tastes were changing, however, and attendance at the Western All Stars' dances ranged from fair to poor, certainly not enough to sustain a large band, which lasted less than two years.

From 1959 to 1961, Duncan again toured and recorded with Wills, rekindling much of their former success. By this time, Duncan's voice had evolved to a mature, mellow croon, and he used it to the greatest effect. When Wills began drinking again, he again left and made personal appearances with various bands. Wills's band never achieved the same greatness it had with Duncan, and Duncan's solo efforts mostly paled in comparison to his Wills output. Although known for Western swing, Duncan enjoyed singing country hits of the day.

=== Death ===
Duncan, who had previous heart problems, died in his motel room in San Diego, California, after a performance at Imperial Beach on July 24, 1967. The coroner's report said he was "lying...on the floor...Evidence victim had a heart condition, numerous pills for heart were found among personal effects." He is buried near Merced, California.

== Legacy ==
On his own and with Wills, Duncan's singing and songwriting were an influence on such artists as Elvis Presley, Jerry Lee Lewis, Ray Price, Willie Nelson, Waylon Jennings, Roy Orbison, Merle Haggard, Buddy Holly, Red Steagall, George Strait, Clint Black, Randy Travis, and Garth Brooks.

As a member of The Texas Playboys, he was inducted into the Rock and Roll Hall of Fame as an Early Influence in 1999, and was also inducted into the Texas Music Hall of Fame.

== Singles ==
Year	Single	US Country
1949	"Gamblin' Polka Dot Blues"	8

== Discography ==
- Texas Moon (Bear Family BCD-15907, 1996) includes all 10 tracks recorded for Capitol Records, two tracks recorded for Natural Records, and eight tracks recorded for Intro Records; plus four tracks recorded by Glynn Duncan & His Bar B Boys.
- Beneath a Neon Star in a Honky Tonk (Bear Family BCD-15957, 1996) includes an additional 24 tracks recorded for Intro Records.
- Dog House Blues (Jasmine JASMCD-3585, 2008) includes all 12 tracks recorded for Coral Records; also included are five tracks by Bob Wills & His Texas Playboys and seven tracks by Billy Jack Wills & His Western Swing Band.
