= Racket (TV series) =

Australian music television show (1991)

Racket was an Australian music television show broadcast by the ABC. It aired after 10pm on Saturday nights leading into Rage. It was presented by James Valentine with Toby Creswell, Stephanie Lewis, Joanne Corrigan and Tim Richie. It was aimed at an audience aged from 25 to 39. It was taken of the air after its initial run of 10 episodes.

Peter Wilmoth of the Age wrote that it "was too self-consciously cool, had no focus or direction".

== See also ==
- List of Australian music television shows
- List of Australian television series
