= Funky Road =

Australian music television show (1976)

Funky Road is an Australian music television show broadcast by ABC. It was a replacement for GTK and ran from March 10 1976 until it ended on 11 August 1976 with a tribute to Little Nell. The show featured live music, profiles and interviews.

== See also ==
- List of Australian music television shows
- List of Australian television series
