= Beatbox (TV series) =

Australian music television show (1985–1987)

- Genre: Music
- Country of origin: Australia
- Original language: English
- No. of seasons: 2
- No. of episodes: 41

Original release
- Network: ABC
- Release: 1985 – 1987

Beatbox was an Australian music television show broadcast by the ABC. It was created with money from Federal Government's Community Employment Program to provide jobs for 15 unemployed teenagers. All had been jobless for at least four months. The teenagers were grouped with some of ABCs production staff to make the show. After 15 episodes in 1985 the funding ran out and the show was to be cancelled but public support led to a second season of 26 episodes in 1986 being funded.

This series moved from a Saturday mid-afternoon slot to midday. Beatbox was primarily a music show but also talked about issues relevant to youth. It was last broadcast in 1987.

== See also ==
- List of Australian music television shows
- List of Australian television series
