= Studio 22 =

Australian music television show (1999-2003)

Studio 22 was an Australian music television show broadcast by the ABC. It was introduced by Clinton Walker and Annette Shun Wah and featured live music being performed in ABC's Studio 22. It featured a wide range of artist, debuting in 1999 with Angelique Kidjo. Other artists featured included Ani DiFranco Mental As Anything, The Necks, Dr John the Night Tripper, David Bridie and Coloured Stone.

== See also ==
- List of Australian music television shows
- List of Australian television series
