= Nomad (TV series) =

Australian music television show (1993–1994)

Nomad, stylised as nomad, was an Australian music television show broadcast by SBS. It did not employ a host and was first broadcast in May 1993. It was a music magazine style show with video clips, interviews and profiles.

== See also ==
- List of Australian music television shows
- List of Australian television series
