= The Real Thing (TV series) =

Australian music television show (1977-78)

The Real Thing is an Australian music television show broadcast by ABC. Beginning in late 1977, it was a 13 part series produced by Bernie Cannon and presented by Ron E. Sparx. It featured Australian acts recorded live during March to July 1977.

== See also ==
- List of Australian music television shows
- List of Australian television series
