= Serenade (TV series) =

1959 Australian TV series

- Genre: Music television
- Starring: Ray Melton
- Country of origin: Australia
- Original language: English

Original release
- Network: ATN-7
- Release: 1959 – 1959

Serenade is an Australian television series which aired 1959 to 1960 on Sydney station ATN-7. It was a music series featuring singer Ray Melton, though several episodes instead featured singer Peggy Brooks. Little else is known about the series.

Broadcast 10:30PM on Mondays. According to a contemporary TV listing, it competed in its time-slot against news on ABN-2 and films on TCN-9.
