= Wrok (TV series) =

Australian music television show (1982)

Wrok was an Australian music television show broadcast by Network Ten in 1982. Broadcast in Melbourne and Sydney it finished in September due to poor ratings. It hosted was Melbourne's Mike O'Loughlin and Sydney's Ian Grace and it was produced by Andrew McVitty who was also producing Nightmoves. It was first broadcast every weekday at 5:30 pm.

== See also ==
- List of Australian music television shows
- List of Australian television series
