= Valerie Cooney Sings =

- Starring: Valerie Cooney; Jack Allan Trio
- Country of origin: Australia
- Original language: English

Production
- Running time: 15 minutes

Original release
- Network: ABN-2
- Release: 8 February – 15 March 1958

Valerie Cooney Sings is an Australian television series of which little information is available. Broadcast on Sydney station ABN-2 from 8 February 1958 to 15 March 1958, TV listings suggest the series featured Valerie Cooney and the Jack Allan Trio. It was a 15-minute series aired on Saturdays.

Cooney had previously hosted Picture Page and later in 1958 appeared in TCN-9's series The House and Garden Show.

The series followed Saturday Screenplay on the schedule, which consisted of feature-length films.

Valerie Cooney Sings was replaced on the schedule by Vic Sabrino Sings.
