= The John Konrads Show =

- Genre: Music
- Presented by: John Konrads
- Country of origin: Australia
- Original language: English

Production
- Running time: 30 minutes

Original release
- Network: TCN-9; HSV-7
- Release: 1960 – 1961

The John Konrads Show is an Australian television series which aired 1960 to 1961. It was produced in Sydney, where it aired on TCN-9, while in Melbourne it aired on HSV-7 (this was prior to the creation of the Seven Network and Nine Network). It was a half-hour music show aimed at teenagers, and hosted by swimmer John Konrads.

== Reception ==
The Australian Women's Weekly called it "well-produced" and said of Konrads "He handles his performers and televiewers with a great deal more charm than many comperes much older in years and experience".
