= The Noise (Australian TV series) =

Australian music television show (1986–1992)

The Noise was an Australian music television show broadcast by SBS from 29 July 1986 until 1992. It was hosted by Annette Shun Wah until her on air departure from the show on 6 December 1992 after which the show was axed. The program played music videos, interviews and live footage. It did not follow the charts like most other shows and they played more emerging performers and played music across many genres. It was cancelled in 1987 due to pay-to-play fees imposed by record companies but was reinstated later that year. It was screened on weekdays at 5:30 pm with a late night compilation show on Fridays before moving to a weekly show on Sundays.

== See also ==
- List of Australian music television shows
- List of Australian television series
