= Johnny Gredula Sings =

- Genre: Music television
- Presented by: Johnny Gredula
- Country of origin: Australia
- Original language: English

Original release
- Network: ATN-7
- Release: 1959 – 1960

Johnny Gredula Sings is an Australian television series which aired on Sydney station ATN-7 from 1959 to 1960. It was a music series, with the songs sung by singer Hungarian-born Johnny Gredula, who sang requested songs.

Prior to this, he starred in The Johnny Gredula Show on ABC Television.
