= Rhythm Roundup =

- Genre: Music television
- Presented by: Roy Hampson
- Country of origin: Australia
- Original language: English

Original release
- Network: ATN-7; ABN-2
- Release: 1957 – 1960

Rhythm Roundup is an Australian television series for which little information is available. It was a music series featuring Roy Hampson, but the exact format is not known. It ran from 1957 to 1960 on Sydney stations ATN-7 and ABN-2.

In 1958 the series featured the Poster Girl contest, with 19-year-old Annette Andre winning. She appeared on the series for four weeks.

It should not be confused with Record Roundup, which featuring the same host and aired on the same station. Although some ATN programming from the late-1950s survives, it is not known if any kinescopes or early video tape exist of either series, given the wiping of the era.
