= It's All Happening (TV series) =

Australian music television show (1966)

It's All Happening was an Australian music television show broadcast by the Seven Network in 1966. It aired on Sunday afternoons and was presented by Billy Thorpe. After its pilot it was produced live. The finale aired on 11 December 1966.

== See also ==
- List of Australian music television shows
- List of Australian television series
