= Melody with Milton =

- Genre: Music television
- Presented by: Milton Saunders
- Country of origin: Australia
- Original language: English

Original release
- Network: ATN-7
- Release: 1958 – 1960

Melody with Milton is an Australian television series which aired from 1958 to 1960 on Sydney station ATN-7. It was a daytime music series with pianist Milton Saunders. In a 1958 TV schedule, it was preceded on the schedule by Your Home, In a May 1959 schedule, it was preceded by American series The Halls of Ivy. The series aired live, and it is not known if any of the episodes were kinescoped (video-tape in those days tended to be re-used to tape other programming, and surviving examples of late-1950s/early-1960s Australian television are usually kinescopes rather than tapes).
