= Vic Sabrino Sings =

Television series

- Genre: Music television
- Starring: Vic Sabrino (George Assang)
- Country of origin: Australia
- Original language: English

Production
- Running time: 15 minutes

Original release
- Network: ABN-2
- Release: 22 March – 28 April 1958

Vic Sabrino Sings is an Australian television series of which little information is available. Broadcast on Sydney television station ABN-2, the 15-minute series appears on TV listings in the Sydney Morning Herald from 22 March 1958 until around 28 April 1958 (see listings in Monday newspapers on Google News Archive). ABC series of the era typically had shorter seasons than those on commercial television.

It followed Saturday Screenplay on ABN-2's schedule.

Vic Sabrino was actually George Assang. Along with Binny Lum he was among the first people of Asian descent to regularly appear on Australian television.
