= Annette Shun Wah =

Australian actress

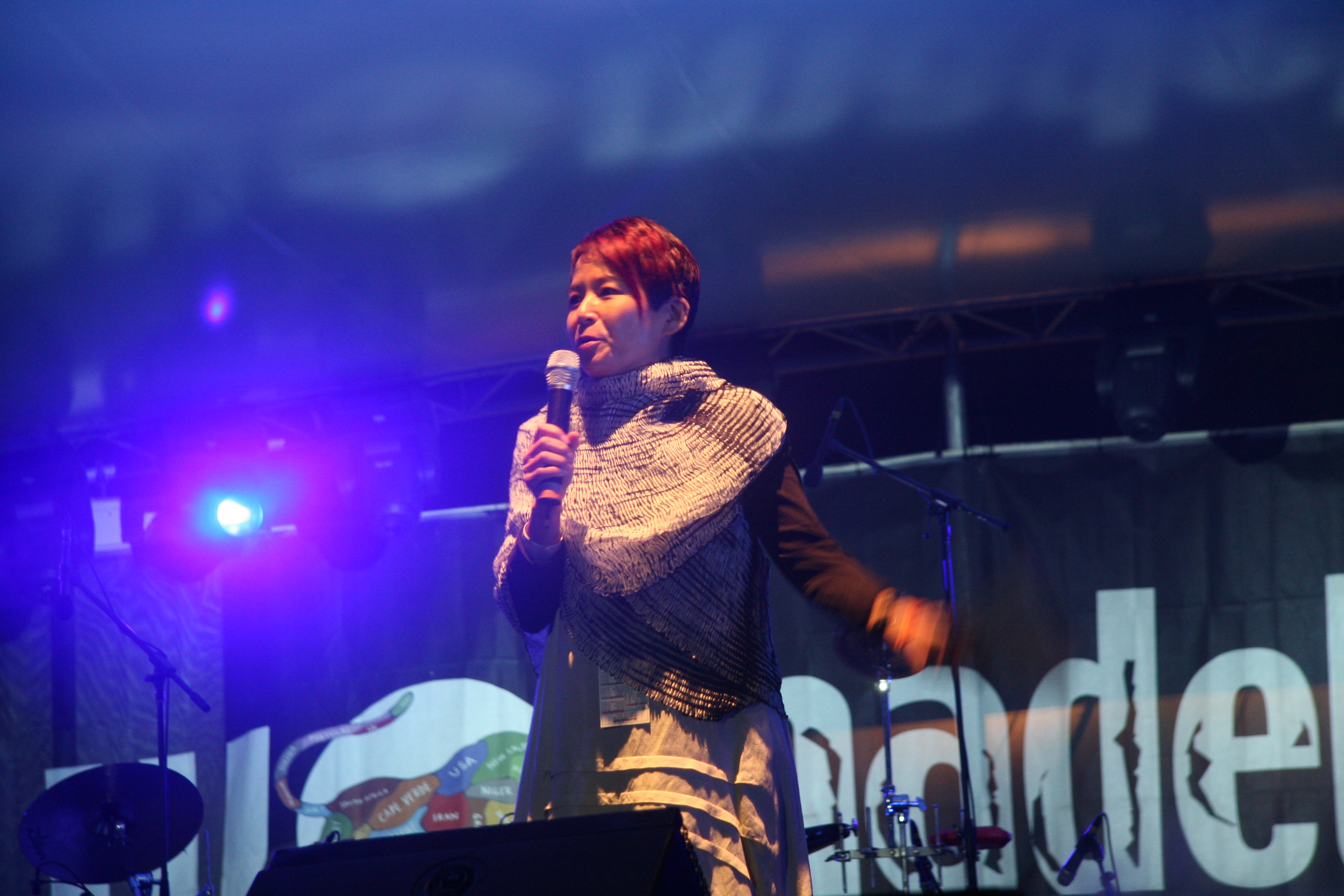
Annette Shun Wah

Annette Shun Wah (born 26 March 1958) is an Australian freelance writer, director, actress, and broadcaster. she has an extensive career in the Australian screen and performance industries, particularly in television, film, radio and theatre. Since 2013, she has been executive producer of the Contemporary Asian Australian Performance at Carriageworks in Sydney.

== Early life ==
A fourth-generation Chinese Australian, Annette Shun Wah was born in Cairns, Queensland. She has an interest in Chinese Australian history, and her family's narrative is included in the National Archives of Australia (NAA) collection, Family Journeys, and featured on their website.

== Career ==
Early in her career, Shun Wah produced and presented for a number of television series on the ABC and SBS. These include The Noise, Eat Carpet, The Movie Show, Studio 22, Media Dimensions, and The Big Picture. She also worked as a radio presenter at 2JJJ in the 1980s.

As well as television, she has appeared in a range of films, including documentaries. Her role in Clara Law's 1996 film Floating Life as a Chinese wife of a German national in Germany won her a nomination for an AFI Award for Best Performance by an Actress in a Supporting Role. In addition, she was a writer and director for China Heart, a mobile phone application and website that provided insight into the heritage of Sydney's Chinatown through a love/mystery narrative.

Since 2013 Shun Wah has been Executive Producer with Asian Australian professional arts company, CAAP (Contemporary Asian Australian Performance), which is resident at Carriageworks arts centre in Sydney. CAAP was formerly known as Performance 4A (which was created in 1997 along with Gallery 4A), and is unique in generating opportunities for development and support for Asian Australians in the performing arts. CAAP was incorporated in 2004, and Shun Wah was a key member of its management committee until 2013, when she became the company's Executive Producer.

Shun Wah is an active commentator on diversity issues in Australia's entertainment industry, and has been a keynote speaker at various academic and community conferences.

In May 2020, Shun Wah was appointed director of the OzAsia festival in Adelaide, taking over from Joseph Mitchell. The festival in November 2020 was cancelled owing to the COVID-19 pandemic in South Australia. In 2021 it went ahead from 21 October to 7 November, though some shows were cancelled due to COVID-19.

== Publications ==
Shun Wah's writing has appeared in several anthologies, including Growing up Asian in Australia, Grandma Magic, and Come away with me. She has also published, with Greg Aitkin, a book on Chinese-Australian cuisine entitled Banquet.

== Awards and appointments ==
- Executive producer, Contemporary Asian Australian Performance (CAAP) (2013–present)
- Board member, Sydney Theatre Company (2018–present)
- Artistic director, National Theatre of Parramatta (2015-2017)
- Nominated for an AFI Award for Best Performance by an Actress in a Supporting Role for Floating Life (1996)
