= List of Rage guest programmers =

Rage (stylised as rage) is an all-night Australian music video program broadcast on ABC Television since 1987, hosted by a large number of guest presenters since 1990. This article lists the presenters to date.

== Background ==
Starting with Andrew Denton in 1990, Rage has a long tradition of inviting a band or artist host the show for the Saturday night episode. The hosts select and introduce their favourite music videos from the Rage library. This gives an insight into the bands' and artists' influences, which are highly regarded by fans whose tapings of the program are highly sought after. Rage has had hundreds of artists host the show over its vast history, as well as politicians, comedians, writers, TV hosts and other figures in the music and entertainment industry. Janet English and Bernard Fanning have programmed the show the most, having each appeared on six different occasions. They are followed by Mike Patton, Paul Dempsey and Tex Perkins, who have appeared five times apiece.

Rage often filmed their guest presenters in various hotels, backstage green rooms, bars, and parts of the ABC building, including the triple j conference room in Ultimo, Sydney. They now mostly film out of their own purpose-built rage studio in ABC Ultimo, Sydney, but also at music festivals and occasionally in musician's homes and hotels.

From March 2020, when COVID-19 pandemic restrictions began to be rolled out in Australia, rage permitted select artists to guest program the show over video call. The nearly two-year-long studio filming hiatus for international guests lasted from March 18, 2020, until March 9, 2022, when Gavin Rossdale from Bush filmed a guest program in the rage studio to coincide with Australia's first international tour since the onset of the COVID-19 pandemic, the Under The Southern Stars concert series.

== Multiple-time guest programmers ==
Artists and groups that have guest programmed Rage three or more times include:

- Ball Park Music: 3 times (2014, 2020, 2025)
- Ben Lee: 3 times (1999, 2003, 2016)
- Bernard Fanning: 2 times individually (2005, 2016), 3 times with Powderfinger (1996, 2000, 2010), 1 time with Fanning Dempsey National Park (2024)
- Bliss n Eso: 3 times (2008, 2013, 2025)
- Bush: 3 times (1996, 2012, 2022)
- Courtney Barnett: 3 times (2016, 2018, 2021)
- Custard: 4 times (1996, 1999, 2016, 2020)
- Dan Sultan: 3 times (2012, 2014, 2019)
- Dave Faulkner: 3 times (1992, 1997, 2022)
- The Dandy Warhols: 3 times (1998, 2003, 2020)
- Eskimo Joe: 3 times (2001, 2005, 2022)
- Franz Ferdinand: 3 times (2004, 2009, 2018)
- Garbage: 4 times (1996 x 2, 1999, 2016)
- Gaz Coombes: 1 time individually (2024) 2 times with Supergrass (1997, 2002)
- Grinspoon: 3 times (1998, 2002, 2012)
- Hilltop Hoods: 3 times (2006, 2009, 2019)
- Hot Chip: 3 times (2007, 2013, 2023)
- Isabella Manfredi: 1 time individually (2022), 2 times with The Preatures (2017, 2025)
- Janet English: 5 times with Spiderbait (1997, 2005, 2009, 2015, 2022), 1 time with Happyland (1998)
- Jebediah: 3 times (1997, 2002, 2015)
- Jen Cloher: 4 times (2016, 2017, 2020, 2023)
- Jimmy Barnes: 3 times individually (1990, 2014, 2019), 1 time with Cold Chisel (2011)
- Kate Ceberano: 3 times (1990, 2016, 2023)
- Metallica: 3 times (1991, 1996, 2004)
- Midnight Oil: 3 times (1990, 2012, 2017)
- Mike Patton: 2 times individually (1990, 2013), 2 times with Faith No More (1995, 1997), 1 time with Peeping Tom (2007)
- Missy Higgins: 3 times (2004, 2012, 2024)
- Nick Littlemore: 2 times with Pnau (2007, 2026), 1 time with Empire Of The Sun (2016)
- Tom Morello: 2 times individually (2006, 2018), 1 time with Audioslave (2003)
- Parkway Drive: 4 times (2010, 2015, 2018, 2022)
- Paul Dempsey: 4 times with Something For Kate (1999, 2003, 2013, 2020), 1 time with Fanning Dempsey National Park (2024)
- Paul Kelly: 3 times (1991, 1997, 2019)
- Phoenix: 4 times (2007, 2010, 2014, 2018)
- Phil Jamieson: 3 times with Grinspoon (1998, 2002, 2012), 1 time individually (2022)
- Powderfinger: 3 times (1996, 2000, 2010)
- Steve Kilbey: 3 times(1992, 2015, 2023)
- The Cat Empire: 3 times (2004, 2010, 2023)
- The Presets: 3 times (2008, 2013, 2018)
- Queens of the Stone Age: 3 times (2001, 2005, 2014)
- Radio Birdman: 3 times (2006, 2014, 2024)
- Sarah Blasko: 3 times individually (2005, 2013, 2024), 1 time with Seeker Lover Keeper (2019)
- Spiderbait: 5 times (1997, 2005, 2009, 2015, 2022)
- Something for Kate: 4 times (1999, 2003, 2013, 2020)
- Tex Perkins: 2 times individually (1991, 2000), 3 times with The Cruel Sea and Beasts of Bourbon (1993, 1998, 2019)
- Tim Rogers: 2 times individually (1999, 2021), 2 times with You Am I (1995, 2006)

As of 2026, Evan Dando holds the record for longest gap between Rage hostings, having hosted on 6 January 1994 and then again 31 years later on 27 September 2025.

== Guest programmers by year ==
=== 1990 ===
- Jan 6: Andrew Denton
- Jan 7: Amanda Brown from the Go-Betweens
- Jan 12: Kate Ceberano
- Jan 13: Ed Kuepper
- Jan 19: Rob Hirst from Midnight Oil
- Jan 20: Neil Murray from the Rainmakers and Warumpi Band
- Jan 26: Alannah Russack from the Hummingbirds
- Jan 27: Damien Lovelock from the Celibate Rifles
- Mar 3: Maynard F# Crabbes
- Apr 7: Mark Seymour from Hunters & Collectors
- May 26: Claudia Castle
- Aug 11: Mike Patton from Faith No More
- Oct 6: Steve Tyler, Joe Perry & Tom Hamilton from Aerosmith
- Nov 24: Jimmy Barnes
- Dec 15: Concrete Blonde

=== 1991 ===
- Jan 4: Flavor Flav from Public Enemy
- Jan 5: Stephen Cummings
- Jan 11: Reg Mombassa from Mental as Anything
- Jan 12: Jenny Morris
- Jan 18: Suzie Higgie from the Falling Joys
- Jan 19: Tex Perkins from the Cruel Sea
- Jan 25: Hard-Ons
- Jan 26: James Valentine
- Feb 23: Pop Will Eat Itself
- Mar 16: Billy Joel
- Apr 6: Bob Geldof from the Boomtown Rats
- Apr 20: Christina Amphlett from Divinyls
- May 4: Susanna Hoffs from the Bangles
- May 18: Paul Kelly
- Jun 1: Mike Edwards from Jesus Jones
- Jun 22: Lemmy from Motörhead
- Jul 13: Capital Q from Dream Warriors
- Sep 7: Siouxsie & the Banshees
- Sep 14: Elvis Costello
- Sep 21: Derry Brownson from EMF
- Sep 27: Turbo B from Snap
- Oct 12: Vince Neil from Mötley Crüe
- Oct 19: Posdnuos from De La Soul
- Nov 2: Gary Clail
- Nov 9: Lars Ulrich from Metallica

=== 1992 ===
- Jan 3: Mandawuy Yunupingu from Yothu Yindi
- Jan 4: Jon Stevens from Noiseworks
- Jan 10: Deborah Conway from Do-Re-Mi
- Jan 11: Ratcat
- Jan 17: Richard Pleasance
- Jan 18: Helen Razer from Triple J
- Jan 24: Dave Faulkner from Hoodoo Gurus
- Jan 25: The Clouds
- Feb 1: Tortelvis from Dread Zeppelin
- Feb 8: Pat DiNizio from the Smithereens
- Feb 15: Ned's Atomic Dustbin
- Feb 22: The Violent Femmes
- Mar 7: Neil Finn, Paul Hester & Nick Seymour from Crowded House
- Mar 21: Henry Rollins
- Mar 28: Fishbone
- Apr 11: Joe Elliot from Def Leppard
- Apr 18: Mick Harvey and Nick Cave from Nick Cave and the Bad Seeds
- May 2: Mick Jones from Big Audio Dynamite II and the Clash
- May 9: Julian Lennon
- May 16: Billy Bragg
- May 23: Steve Kilbey from the Church
- Oct 10: Kylie Minogue

=== 1993 ===
- May 8: Michael Hutchence from INXS
- Aug 28: Winner of the Rage/Triple J Video Hottest 100 competition
- Sep 4: World Party
- Sep 11: Vernon Reid from Living Colour
- Sep 18: Baby Animals
- Oct 2: Tex Perkins and Ken Gormly of The Cruel Sea
- Oct 9: Siouxsie & the Banshees
- Oct 16: Dean and Gene Ween from Ween
- Oct 30: Ice-T from Body Count

=== 1994 ===
- Jan 6: Evan Dando from the Lemonheads
- Jan 13: Tiny Tim
- Jan 20: Terence Trent D'Arby
- Jan 27: Layne Staley from Alice in Chains
- Feb 12: The Breeders
- Feb 19: Chris Cornell from Soundgarden
- Feb 26: Kirsty MacColl
- Apr 2: k.d. lang
- Apr 16: Elvis Costello
- May 28: Ice cube & Others
- Jun 4: Billy Thorpe from Billy Thorpe and the Aztecs
- Jun 11: Fiona Horne from Def FX
- Jun 25: DIG
- Jul 2: Matt Deighton from Mother Earth & Eddie Piller
- Aug 13: Bad Brains
- Aug 27: Beck
- Sep 3: Ru Paul
- Sep 10: Max Cavalera & Andreas Kisser from Sepultura
- Sep 17: Lydia Lunch
- Oct 1: Triple J's Jaslyn Hall
- Oct 8: Frank Black from the Pixies
- Oct 15: Page Hamilton from Helmet
- Oct 22: Beastie Boys
- Nov 12: Michael Franti and Mary Harris from Spearhead
- Nov 19: Diesel
- Dec 24: Nick Cave from Nick Cave and the Bad Seeds and the Birthday Party

=== 1995 ===
- Feb 4: Grant Lee Buffalo
- Feb 11: Mike Mills from R.E.M.
- Feb 18: Ian Astbury from the Cult
- Mar 11: Eric Erlandson, Melissa Auf Der Maur & Patty Schemel from Hole
- Mar 18: Aki & Dave from Fun-Da-Mental
- Apr 1: Slash from Guns N' Roses and Snakepit
- Apr 8: Paul Barker from Ministry
- Apr 15: Throwing Muses
- Apr 22: Mark Lanegan & Van Conner from Screaming Trees
- Apr 29: Edwyn Collins
- May 6: Ed Kowalczyk and Patrick Dahlheimer from Live
- May 20: TISM
- May 27: Primal Scream
- Jun 3: Jennifer Finch and Suzi Gardner from L7
- Jun 17: William and Jim Reid from The Jesus and Mary Chain
- Jul 1: Mike Muir from Suicidal Tendencies
- Jul 8: Massive Attack
- Jul 22: Richie Lewis and Lenny Curley from Tumbleweed
- Aug 5: Robb Flynn and Logan Mader from Machine Head
- Aug 19: Chris Isaak & Kenney Dale Johnson
- Sep 2: Mike Patton and Roddy Bottum from Faith No More
- Sep 9: Daniel Johns, Ben Gillies and Chris Joannou from Silverchair
- Sep 16: Ray Manzarek from the Doors & Danny Sugarman (The Doors manager/biographer)
- Sept 30: You Am I

=== 1996 ===
- Jan 6: Butch Vig from Garbage
- Feb 17: Dave Graney and Clare Moore
- Mar 9: Perry Farrell from Porno for Pyros
- Mar 16: Maxim, Keith Flint, Leeroy Thornhill & Liam Howlett from the Prodigy
- Apr 6: Buffalo Tom
- Apr 13: Justine Frischmann and Donna Matthews from Elastica
- Apr 20: The Tea Party
- Apr 27: Ian Brown from the Stone Roses
- May 4: k.d. lang
- May 11: Fear Factory
- May 18: Paul D'Amour from Tool
- Jun 1: James Hetfield and Jason Newsted from Metallica
- Jun 22: James Iha and D'arcy from the Smashing Pumpkins
- Jul 13: Malcolm McLaren
- Aug 10: Quan Yeomans, Ben Ely & Martin Lee from Regurgitator
- Aug 17: The Presidents of the United States of America
- Aug 24: Pollyanna
- Sept 14: Robert Forster from the Go-Betweens
- Sep 21: Custard
- Oct 5: Insurge
- Oct 12: Everclear
- Oct 19: Bernard Fanning, Ian Haug & John Collins from Powderfinger
- Oct 26: Neneh Cherry
- Nov 9: Shirley Manson and Steve Marker from Garbage
- Nov 16: Stan Ridgway
- Nov 30: Brian Bell & Matt Sharp from Weezer
- Dec 7: Coxy, Doug & Doctor from The Fauves
- Dec 14: Ash
- Dec 21: Gavin Rossdale & Nigel Pulsford from Bush

=== 1997 ===
- Feb 8: Lauryn Hill, Wyclef Jean & Pras Michel from the Fugees
- Feb 15: Barry Adamson
- Feb 22: Gavin Rossdale & Nigel Pulsford from Bush (repeat of 21 Dec 1996 episode)
- Mar 15: Greg Graffin & Jay Bentley from Bad Religion
- Mar 22: Spiderbait
- Mar 29: Gaz Coombes & Mick Quinn from Supergrass
- Apr 5: Henry Rollins & Chris Haskett from Rollins Band
- Apr 12: Tracey Thorn & Ben Watt from Everything but the Girl
- Apr 26: Bis
- May 10: Local H
- May 17: Adalita, Dean Turner & Adam Robertson from Magic Dirt
- May 24: Jonathan Davis, Brian Welch & Reginald Arvizu from Korn
- May 31: Ed Kowalczyk & Patrick Dahlheimer from Live (repeat of 6 May 1995 episode):
- Jun 21: Paul Kelly
- Jul 12: Rail
- Jul 19: Josie Scott & Kim Scott from The Mark of Cain
- Aug 9: Screamfeeder
- Aug 16: Steve Malkmus & Mark Ibold from Pavement
- Aug 30: Sidewinder
- Sep 6: The Blackeyed Susans
- Sep 20: Alice Cooper
- Oct 11: Ben Folds Five
- Oct 18: Dave Faulkner and Brad Shepherd from Hoodoo Gurus
- Oct 25: Nina Gordon & Louise Post from Veruca Salt
- Nov 1: Jimmy Pop & Lupus Thunder from the Bloodhound Gang
- Nov 8: Devo
- Nov 15: John McCrea, Greg Brown, Vince DiFiore & Todd Roper from Cake
- Nov 29: Mike Patton, Roddy Bottum & Mike Bordin from Faith No More
- Dec 6: Jebediah

=== 1998 ===
- Feb 14: Ben Harper and the Innocent Criminals
- Mar 7: Phil & Ed from Radiohead
- Mar 14: Phil & Joe from Grinspoon
- Mar 21: Dave Grohl & Franz Stahl from Foo Fighters
- Mar 28: Stone Gossard from Brad/Pearl Jam & Regan Hagar from Brad
- Apr 4: The Whitlams
- Apr 11: Devo (repeat of 8 November 1997 episode)
- Apr 18: Tanya Donelly
- Apr 25: Billie Joe Armstrong, Tre Cool & Mike Dirnt from Green Day
- May 2: Ammonia
- May 9: Arkarna
- May 23: Les Claypool from Primus
- May 30: Warren Ellis, Jim White & Mick Turner from Dirty Three
- Jun 13: Frenzal Rhomb
- Jun 27: Mark Hoppus, Tom DeLonge & Scott Raynor from Blink 182
- Jul 25: Tex Perkins & James Cruickshank from the Cruel Sea
- Aug 8: Natasha Schaade (Triple J's Hottest 100 of All Time winner)
- Aug 22: Dicky Barrett & Joe G from The Mighty Mighty Bosstones
- Sep 12: Snout
- Sep 19: Janet English & Quan Yeomans from Happyland
- Oct 3: Paul McDermott & Mikey Robins
- Oct 17: Thurston Moore & Lee Ranaldo from Sonic Youth
- Oct 31: Marcy Playground
- Nov 7: The Living End
- Nov 14: The Cruel Sea (repeat of the 25 July 1998 episode)
- Nov 21: The Dandy Warhols
- Nov 28: Richard Kingsmill from Triple J radio (Australian Music Month special)
- Dec 12: Sarah McLeod, Stuart Rudd & Paul Berryman from The Superjesus
- Dec 19: Slayer

=== 1999 ===
- Feb 6: Marilyn Manson
- Feb 13: Ben Lee
- Feb 20: Courtney Love, Eric Erlandson, Melissa Auf der Maur and Samantha Maloney from Hole
- Feb 27: Pauline Pantsdown and Vanessa Wagner
- Mar 20: Huey from Fun Lovin' Criminals
- Mar 27: James and Nicky from Manic Street Preachers
- Apr 3: Tim Rogers from You Am I
- Apr 17: Not from There
- Apr 24: Jon Spencer Blues Explosion
- May 1: Billy Bragg
- May 8: Robert Forster & Grant McLennan From the Go-Betweens
- May 15: Placebo
- May 22: Gerling
- May 29: Courtney Love, Eric Erlandson, Melissa Auf der Maur and Samantha Maloney from Hole (repeat of the 20 February 1999 episode)
- Jun 5: Billie Joe Armstrong, Mike Dirnt and Tre Cool from Green Day (repeat of the 25 April 1998 episode)
- Jun 12: Mix Master Mike
- Jul 3: Something for Kate
- Jul 10: Marilyn Manson (repeat of the 6 February 1999 episode)
- Jul 17: Custard
- Jul 24: Derrick Green & Igor Cavalera from Sepultura
- Jul 31: Reef
- Aug 7: Moby
- Aug 14: Merrick and Rosso
- Aug 28: Richard and Geno from Filter
- Sep 4: Silverchair
- Sep 11: Dave Wyndorf & Phil Caivano from Monster Magnet
- Sep 25: Rebecca and Shane from Rebecca's Empire
- Oct 2: Alex Lloyd
- Oct 16: Brett, Simon and Mat from Suede
- Oct 23: Jon, Tom and Karl from Shihad
- Oct 30: Placebo (repeat of the 15 May 1999 episode)
- Nov 6: Jonathan, Grasshopper and Justin from Mercury Rev
- Nov 13: Shirley Manson, Butch Vig, Duke Erikson and Steve Marker from Garbage
- Dec 18: Killing Heidi

=== 2000 ===
- Feb 26: Trent Reznor from NIN
- Mar 11: Ian Ball & Olly Peacock from Gomez
- Mar 18: Corey, Shawn & Joey from Slipknot
- Mar 25: Apollo 440
- Apr 1: Beth Orton
- Apr 8: Ed Kowalczyk from Live
- Apr 29: Sugar Ray
- May 6: Sonic Animation
- Jun 3: Gwen Stefani, Tom Dumont, Tony Kanal and Adrian Young from No Doubt
- Jun 10: Trent Reznor from Nine Inch Nails (repeat of the 26 February 2000 episode)
- Jun 24: Groove Terminator
- Jul 8: Moby (repeat of 7 August 1999 episode)
- Jul 22: Friendly
- Jul 29: 28 Days
- Aug 5: Gomez (repeat of 11 March 2000 episode)
- Aug 12: Billy, Maynard and Troy from A Perfect Circle
- Sep 2: Powderfinger
- Sep 9: Bodyjar
- Sep 16: MxPx
- Sep 23: Fuel
- Oct 7: The Fauves
- Oct 28: Christine Anu
- Nov 11: Fatboy Slim
- Dec 9: The Avalanches
- Dec 16: Tex Perkins
- Dec 23: Augie March

=== 2001 ===
- Feb 17: Boss Hog
- Feb 24: Chris Martin and Jonny Buckland from Coldplay
- Mar 3: Bob Downe and Vanessa Wagner
- Mar 10: will.i.am, Taboo and apl.de.ap from Black Eyed Peas
- Mar 17: Josh Homme and Nick Oliveri from Queens of the Stone Age
- Mar 24: Shaun Ryder from Happy Mondays
- Mar 31: Gene Simmons and Paul Stanley from Kiss
- Apr 14: Lotel
- Apr 28: At the Drive-In
- May 5: Roni Size/Reprazent
- May 12: Chris Martin and Jonny Buckland from Coldplay (repeat of the 24 February 2001 episode)
- May 26: Motor Ace
- Jun 9: Pantera
- Jun 16: Chester Bennington, Brad Delson & Rob Bourdon from Linkin Park
- Jun 23: Bomfunk MC's
- Jun 30: Gene Simmons and Paul Stanley from Kiss (repeat of the 31 March 2001 episode)
- Jul 28: Paul Mac
- Aug 11: The Strokes
- Aug 18: Stephen Malkmus
- Aug 25: Michael Franti and RadioActive from Spearhead
- Sep 8: Travis
- Sep 22: Eskimo Joe
- Oct 13: Stella One Eleven
- Oct 20: Butthole Surfers
- Nov 17: The John Butler Trio
- Dec 1: Resin Dogs
- Dec 15: Scott & PK from Unwritten Law
- Dec 22: Posdnuos, Trugoy and Maseo from De La Soul

=== 2002 ===
- Feb 9: Bernard Sumner, Peter Hook and Stephen Morris from New Order
- Feb 16: Dryden Mitchell & Mike Cosgrove from Alien Ant Farm
- Feb 23: Ryan Adams
- Mar 2: Stephen Allkins A.K.A. Love Tattoo
- Mar 9: Shavo Odadjian & John Dolmayan from System of a Down
- Mar 16: Basement Jaxx
- Mar 23: Andrew W.K.
- Mar 30: David Byrne
- Apr 6: Incubus
- Apr 13: George
- Apr 20: They Might Be Giants
- Apr 27: Jurassic 5
- May 4: Crystal Method
- May 18: Groove Armada
- May 25: Jebediah
- Jun 1: Maxi Jazz & Sister Bliss from Faithless
- Jun 8: One Dollar Short
- Jun 22: Bluebottle Kiss
- Jun 29: Grinspoon
- Jul 13: Jack Black and Kyle Gass from Tenacious D
- Jul 27: Andrew Haug from Triple J
- Aug 10: Supergrass
- Aug 17: Robert Turner & Peter Hayes from Black Rebel Motorcycle Club
- Aug 24: Doves
- Aug 31: Jon Toogood & Tom Larkin from Pacifier
- Sep 7: Machine Gun Fellatio
- Sep 14: Tom Gray & Olly Peacock from Gomez
- Sep 28: Kasey Chambers
- Oct 5: The Vines
- Oct 19: Dave Grohl, Taylor Hawkins, Chris Shiflett and Nate Mendel from the Foo Fighters
- Oct 26: Superheist
- Nov 9: The Streets
- Nov 16: ...And You Will Know Us by the Trail of Dead
- Dec 14: Dominic, Barry & John from Mogwai
- Dec 21: Max Cavalera from Soulfly

=== 2003 ===
- Feb 8: Karl Hyde from Underworld
- Feb 22: Josh Homme and Nick Oliveri from Queens of the Stone Age (repeat of 17 Mar 2001 episode)
- Mar 1: Perry Farrell, Dave Navarro, Stephen Perkins and Chris Chaney from Jane's Addiction
- Mar 8: Xzibit
- Mar 15: Jim Adkins & Ric Burch from Jimmy Eat World
- Mar 22: Robert Harvey & Phil Jordan from the Music
- Apr 5: Wil Anderson
- Apr 12: Beck
- Apr 26: Stephen Carpenter, Abe Cunningham & Frank Delgado from Deftones
- May 3: Badly Drawn Boy
- May 10: Yeah Yeah Yeahs
- May 17: John Stirratt & Glenn Kotche from Wilco
- May 24: Murderdolls
- May 31: Sleater Kinney
- Jun 7: Grandmaster Flash
- Jun 14:Chris Cornell, Brad Wilk, Tom Morello & Tim Commerford from Audioslave
- Jun 21: The Datsuns
- Jul 5: Lou Barlow
- Jul 12: Sleek the Elite
- Jul 19: The Music (repeat of 22 March 2003 episode)
- Jul 26: The Sleepy Jackson
- Aug 9: Placebo
- Aug 16: Amiel
- Aug 23: Courtney Taylor-Taylor & Brent DeBoer from the Dandy Warhols
- Aug 30: Beck (repeat of the 12 April 2003 episode)
- Sep 6: Debbie Harry, Clem Burke and Jimmy Destri from Blondie
- Sep 13: Something for Kate
- Sep 20: AFI
- Sep 27: Cat Power
- Oct 4: E from Eels
- Oct 11: The Living End
- Oct 18: Ben Lee
- Nov 1: Fat Mike from NOFX and Me First and the Gimme Gimmes
- Nov 8: Har Mar Superstar
- Nov 29: Skulker
- Dec 6: Dexter Holland & Noodles from the Offspring
- Dec 13: Super Furry Animals
- Dec 20: Chris Cornell, Brad Wilk, Tom Morello & Tim Commerford from Audioslave (repeat of the 14 June 2003 episode)

=== 2004 ===
- Feb 7: The Darkness
- Feb 28: Lars Ulrich and Robert Trujillo from Metallica
- Mar 6: Róisín Murphy from Moloko
- Mar 13: Jet
- Mar 20: Wayne Coyne from the Flaming Lips
- Mar 27: Gang Starr
- Apr 3: Muse
- Apr 10: Kings of Leon
- Apr 17: Felix Riebl, Will Hull-Brown & Jamshid Khadiwhala from The Cat Empire
- Apr 24: Afrika Bambaataa
- May 1: Guy Garvey & Pete Turner from Elbow
- May 15: The Dissociatives
- May 22: Panjabi MC
- May 29: Scott Ian, John Bush & Joey Vera from Anthrax
- Jun 5: Jason Lytle, Jim Fairchild & Kevin Garcia from Grandaddy
- Jun 12: 1200 Techniques
- Jun 26: Andre 3000 from Outkast
- Jul 3: Kim Gordon and Thurston Moore from Sonic Youth
- Jul 10: Silverchair (repeat of 9 September 1995 episode)
- Jul 17: Wanda Dee vocalist for The KLF
- Jul 24: Jungle Brothers
- Jul 31: Franz Ferdinand
- Aug 7: Cyndi Lauper
- Aug 14: Ash
- Aug 21: Pete Murray
- Aug 28: Ozomatli
- Sep 11: Ben Kweller
- Sep 18: Belle and Sebastian
- Sep 25: Butterfingers
- Oct 2: Goodshirt
- Oct 9: Jet
- Oct 16: Infusion
- Oct 23: Tripod
- Oct 30: Jean-Jacques Burnel, Baz Warne & Paul Roberts from the Stranglers
- Nov 6: Sum 41
- Nov 20: Little Birdy
- Nov 27: Robbie Buck
- Dec 4: Devendra Banhart
- Dec 11: Rocket Science
- Dec 18: Missy Higgins

=== 2005 ===
- Feb 5: The Hives
- Feb 19: Eskimo Joe
- Feb 26: The Polyphonic Spree
- Mar 5: Jake Shears, Del Marquis & Paddy Boom from Scissor Sisters
- Mar 12: The Donnas
- Mar 19: Slash & Dave Kushner from Velvet Revolver
- Mar 26: Freestylers
- Apr 2: Speech from Arrested Development
- Apr 16: Le Tigre
- Apr 23: Mylo
- Apr 30: Maxim, Keith Flint & Liam Howlett from the Prodigy
- May 7: The Black Keys
- May 14: Lyrics Born
- May 21: Jack Johnson, Donavon Frankenreiter and G. Love
- May 28: Bent
- Jun 4: Scribe
- Jun 11: The Used
- Jun 18: Handsome Boy Modeling School
- Jun 25: Tori Amos
- Jul 2: Mudvayne
- Jul 9: Stereophonics
- Jul 16: Shihad
- Jul 30: End of Fashion
- Aug 6: Ice-T & Afrika Islam
- Aug 20: Queens of the Stone Age
- Aug 27: Billy Corgan from the Smashing Pumpkins
- Sep 3: Bloc Party
- Sep 10: Magic Dirt
- Sep 17: Don Letts
- Sep 24: Interpol
- Oct 1: Queens of the Stone Age (repeat of the 20 August 2005 episode)
- Oct 8: The Bravery
- Oct 15: Fozzy
- Oct 22: Britt Daniel from Spoon
- Oct 29: Kisschasy
- Nov 5: Sarah Blasko
- Nov 12: Spiderbait
- Nov 26: Bernard Fanning
- Dec 3: Hot Hot Heat
- Dec 10: Wolfmother
- Dec 17: Teenage Fanclub
- Dec 24: Julian, Nick and Fab from The Strokes

=== 2006 ===
- Feb 4: My Chemical Romance
- Feb 11: Roots Manuva
- Feb 25: Kaiser Chiefs
- Mar 4: Millencolin
- Mar 11: Sons and Daughters
- Mar 18: Hilltop Hoods
- Mar 25: Antony from Antony and the Johnsons
- Apr 1: Faker
- Apr 8: The Go! Team
- Apr 15: Ugly Duckling
- Apr 22: Soulwax
- Apr 29: Dresden Dolls
- May 6: Maynard James Keenan & Danny Carey from Tool
- May 13: Datarock
- May 20: You Am I
- May 27: M.I.A.
- Jun 10: Gyroscope
- Jun 17: Martha Wainwright
- Jun 24: Shout Out Louds
- Jul 1: Annie
- Jul 15: Youth Group
- Jul 22: Hilltop Hoods (repeat of the 18 March 2006 episode)
- Jul 29: After the Fall
- Aug 5: The Sleepy Jackson
- Aug 12: DJ Shadow
- Aug 19: Dirty Three
- Sep 2: Tom Morello
- Sep 9: The Zutons
- Sep 16: The Butterfly Effect
- Sep 23: Death Cab for Cutie
- Sep 30: Gary Lightbody & Tom Simpson from Snow Patrol
- Oct 7: Rob Younger & Deniz Tek from Radio Birdman
- Oct 21: Lily Allen
- Oct 28: TV on the Radio
- Nov 4: Zakk Wylde from Black Label Society
- Nov 11: Panic! at the Disco
- Nov 25: Def Wish Cast
- Dec 2: Joan as Police Woman
- Dec 9: Hard-Fi
- Dec 16: We Are Scientists
- Dec 23: Infadels

=== 2007 ===
- Feb 3: Tapes 'n Tapes
- Feb 10: Kasabian
- Feb 24: Hot Chip
- Mar 3: Trivium
- Mar 10: Josh Pyke
- Mar 24: Peaches
- Mar 31: Mike D, Adam Yauch and Ad Rock from the Beastie Boys
- May 5: Peter Bjorn and John
- May 12: +44
- May 19: Wolf & Cub
- May 26: Timo Maas
- Jun 2: Unwritten Law
- Jun 9: Jarvis Cocker from Pulp
- Jun 16: Fall Out Boy
- Jun 23: Jenny Wilson
- Jun 30: Boots Electric from Eagles of Death Metal
- Jul 7: 30 Seconds to Mars
- Jul 14: The Rapture
- Jul 21: Hatebreed
- Jul 28: Phoenix
- Aug 4: Matt Sharawara, winner of Invade Rage competition
- Aug 11: Jamie T
- Aug 25: Dappled Cities Fly
- Sep 1: Cold War Kids
- Sep 8: Clutch
- Sep 15: Editors
- Sep 22: Mike Patton & Imani Coppola from Peeping Tom
- Sep 29: Pop Levi
- Oct 6: Maxïmo Park
- Oct 13: Tilly and the Wall
- Oct 20: The Horrors
- Oct 27: Architecture in Helsinki
- Nov 3: James Lavelle
- Nov 10: Expatriate
- Nov 24: Gotye
- Dec 31: The Chaser

=== 2008 ===
- Feb 2: Klaxons
- Feb 9: Clare Bowditch
- Feb 16: The Gossip
- Mar 1: Andrew Weatherall
- Mar 8: Battles
- Mar 15: Dizzee Rascal
- Mar 22: Shy Child
- Mar 29: Enter Shikari
- Apr 5: Calvin Harris
- Apr 12: The Matches
- Apr 19: Digitalism
- Apr 26: The Panics
- May 3: Anti-Flag
- May 10: The Mess Hall
- May 17: Kate Nash
- May 24: Alexisonfire
- May 31: Cut Copy
- Jun 14: Bliss n Eso
- Jun 21: The Paper Scissors
- Jun 28: Cog
- Jul 5: Tiesto
- Jul 12: Jim Lindberg and Fletcher Dragge from Pennywise
- Jul 19: The Presets
- Jul 26: Liam Finn
- Aug 2: Utah Saints
- Aug 16: Katalyst
- Aug 23: Cedric Bixler-Zavala and Omar Rodríguez-López from the Mars Volta
- Aug 30: Bonde do Rolê
- Sep 6: Tricky
- Sep 20: The Herd
- Sep 27: The Fratellis
- Oct 4: Mstrkrft
- Oct 11: The Kooks
- Oct 18: Anton Newcombe from the Brian Jonestown Massacre
- Oct 25: Pnau
- Nov 1: Muph & Plutonic
- Nov 8: British India
- Nov 15: Van She
- Nov 22: Something with Numbers
- Nov 29: Sparkadia
- Dec 13: The Grates
- Dec 20: Blackalicious

=== 2009 ===
- Feb 7: MGMT
- Feb 14: Mark Ronson
- Feb 21: The Drones
- Mar 7: Busy P
- Mar 14: Bill Callahan
- Mar 21: Lupe Fiasco
- Mar 28: Bloc Party
- Apr 4: Lawrence Leung
- Apr 11: Bullet for My Valentine
- Apr 18: Justin Vernon of Bon Iver
- May 2: Cansei de Ser Sexy
- May 9: The Charlatans
- May 23: Howling Bells
- May 30: Gary Numan
- Jun 6: Tim Minchin
- Jun 20: TZU
- Jun 27: Franz Ferdinand
- Jul 4: Eddie Perfect
- Jul 11: Jessica Mauboy
- Jul 18: Mark Ramone from the Ramones
- Jul 25: Ben Harper and Relentless7
- Aug 15: Mia Dyson
- Aug 22: Pendulum
- Aug 29: Suggs of Madness
- Sep 5: Myf, Adam and Alan of Spicks and Specks
- Sep 12: Sia
- Sep 19: The Kills
- Sep 26: Alice in Chains
- Oct 3: Four Tet
- Oct 17: Richard Lowenstein
- Oct 24: Wayne Coyne from the Flaming Lips
- Oct 31: Lamb of God
- Nov 7: Ross Wilson from Daddy Cool and Mondo Rock
- Nov 14: Greedy Smith and Martin Plaza from Mental as Anything
- Nov 21: Spiderbait
- Nov 28: Hilltop Hoods
- Dec 5: Friendly Fires
- Dec 12: Alkaline Trio
- Dec 19: Janette Beckman

=== 2010 ===
- Feb 6: Grizzly Bear
- Feb 20: Florence Welch from Florence and the Machine
- Feb 27: Patrick Wolf
- Mar 6: Bluejuice
- Mar 13: A-Trak
- Mar 20: Amanda Palmer
- Mar 27: Robot Chicken
- Apr 3: Animal Collective
- Apr 17: Bertie Blackman
- Apr 24: Bernard Fanning and Darren Middleton from Powderfinger
- May 8: John Safran
- May 15: Phoenix
- May 22: Operator Please
- May 29: Diplo
- Jun 5: Troy Sanders, Brann Dailor & Bill Kelliher from Mastodon
- Jun 19: Bajo and Hex from Good Game
- Jun 26: Meat Loaf
- Jul 3: Karnivool
- Jul 10: Troy Cassar-Daley
- Jul 17: Mike Fielding
- Jul 24: Z-Trip
- Jul 31: OK Go
- Aug 7: The Cat Empire
- Aug 14: Sally Seltmann
- Aug 28: k-os
- Sep 4: Xavier Rudd
- Sep 18: Washington
- Sep 25: Yeasayer
- Oct 2: Old Man River
- Oct 9: Band of Horses
- Oct 16: Bret Easton Ellis
- Oct 30: Dan Kelly
- Nov 6: The Last Kinection
- Nov 13: Angus & Julia Stone
- Nov 20: Midnight Juggernauts
- Nov 27: Parkway Drive
- Dec 4: DJ Spinderella
- Dec 11: Tony Mott
- Dec 18: Wiley

=== 2011 ===
- Feb 12: Joan Jett and the Blackhearts
- Feb 19: The National
- Feb 26: PVT
- Mar 12: Dropkick Murphys
- Mar 19: CocoRosie
- Mar 26: Arj Barker
- Apr 2: Wire
- Apr 9: Best Coast
- Apr 16: Rahzel formally from the Roots & DJ JS1
- Apr 23: Jon Spencer from Jon Spencer Blues Explosion
- May 7: Birds of Tokyo
- May 14: Sharon Jones from Sharon Jones & the Dap-Kings
- May 21: Foals
- May 28: Art vs. Science
- Jun 4: Airbourne
- Jun 11: Neil Gaiman and Amanda Palmer
- Jun 25: Two Door Cinema Club
- Jul 2: Bat for Lashes
- Jul 9: Warwick Thornton
- Jul 16: Martin Solveig
- Jul 23: The Wombats
- Jul 30: The Vines
- Aug 6: Sneaky Sound System
- Aug 20: Rob Zombie
- Aug 27: Les Savy Fav
- Sep 3: Toby Creswell, Craig Mathieson and John O'Donnell
- Sep 10: Jimmy Barnes, Ian Moss, Don Walker and Phil Small from Cold Chisel
- Sep 24: Kimbra
- Oct 1: Phrase
- Oct 8: Alice Cooper
- Oct 15: Example
- Oct 22: Baron Wolman
- Nov 5: Boy & Bear
- Nov 12: Horrorshow
- Nov 19: The Jezabels
- Nov 26: Bag Raiders
- Dec 3: Iva Davies of Icehouse
- Dec 10: Bloody Beetroots
- Dec 17: Suzi Quatro

=== 2012 ===
- Feb 4: Arctic Monkeys
- Feb 18: Architecture in Helsinki
- Feb 25: Geoff Barrow of Portishead
- Mar 10: Kitty Daisy and Lewis
- Mar 17: Ladyhawke
- Mar 24: Jesse Peretz from the Lemonheads
- Mar 31: David Stewart from the Tourists, Eurythmics and SuperHeavy
- Apr 7: Chairlift
- Apr 14: Wild Flag
- Apr 28: Anthony Gonzalez of M83
- May 5: Gavin Rossdale of Bush
- May 12: Children Collide
- May 19: The Temper Trap
- May 26: Jon King and Andy Gill of Gang of Four
- Jun 9: Shaun Micallef
- Jun 16: Imogen Heap
- Jun 23: Zola Jesus
- Jun 30: Dan Sultan and Archie Roach
- Jul 7: Keith Urban
- Jul 14: Van She
- Jul 21: The Bamboos
- Aug 4: Kate Miller-Heidke
- Aug 11: Blood Orange
- Aug 18: Billy Corgan from the Smashing Pumpkins
- Sep 1: Gotye
- Sep 8: The xx
- Sep 15: Bootie Brown and Imani of The Pharcyde
- Sep 29: Tim & Eric
- Oct 6: Tame Impala
- Oct 13: Rob Barrett, Paul Mazurkiewicz and Alex Webster of Cannibal Corpse
- Oct 20: Dappled Cities
- Nov 3: Rob Hirst and Jim Moginie from Midnight Oil
- Nov 10: Lanie Lane
- Nov 17: Grinspoon
- Dec 1: Missy Higgins
- Dec 8: F Buttons
- Dec 15: Rick Astley

=== 2013 ===
- Feb 2: Sarah Blasko
- Feb 9: Django Django
- Feb 16: Margaret Pomeranz and David Stratton
- Feb 23: Grimes
- Mar 9: Mike Patton from Faith No More
- Mar 16: The Presets
- Mar 23: Beach House
- Apr 6: Brian Aubert, Christopher Guanlao and Joe Lester from Silversun Pickups
- Apr 13: Jim Kerr from Simple Minds
- Apr 20: Urthboy
- Apr 27: Regina Spektor
- May 4: Tegan and Sara
- May 11: Vampire Weekend
- May 18: Chris Bailey from the Saints
- May 18: Robyne Dunn
- May 25: Angus, Aaron and Julian from Liars
- Jun 1: Foals
- Jun 8: Something for Kate
- Jun 15: Mikael Åkerfeldt and Fredrik Åkesson from Opeth
- Jun 22: Hot Chip
- Jun 29: Steve Albini
- Jul 6: Bliss n Eso
- Jul 13: Wayne Blair
- Jul 20: Bill Oddie from the Goodies
- Aug 3: James Dean Bradfield and Nicky Wire from Manic Street Preachers
- Aug 10: Cloud Control
- Aug 17: Karnivool
- Aug 24: Haim
- Aug 31: Anthony Albanese, Julie Bishop and Adam Bandt
- Sep 7: MS MR
- Sep 14: Cosmic Psychos
- Sep 21: Of Monsters and Men
- Oct 5: Passion Pit
- Oct 12: Moby
- Oct 19: Wavves
- Oct 26: Portugal. The Man
- Nov 2: Josh Pyke
- Nov 9: Elefant Traks
- Nov 16: Cut Copy
- Nov 23: Brian Ritchie from Violent Femmes
- Nov 30: AlunaGeorge
- Dec 7: Kim Wilde
- Dec 14: Rudimental

=== 2014 ===
- Feb 1: Spiderbait
- Feb 8: Nile Rodgers from Chic
- Feb 15: Pond
- Mar 1: Le1f
- Mar 8: Two Nameless Ghouls from Ghost
- Mar 15: Danny Brown
- Mar 22: Jeremy Oxley and Peter Oxley from Sunnyboys
- Mar 29: Kurt Vile
- Apr 5: Ball Park Music
- Apr 12: The Scientists
- Apr 19: Dan Sultan
- Apr 26: The Jezabels
- May 3: Ian Astbury from the Cult
- May 10: Phoenix
- May 17: Holy Fuck
- May 24: St. Vincent
- May 31: Primitive Calculators
- Jun 7: The Amity Affliction
- Jun 14: Josh Homme from Queens of the Stone Age
- Jun 21: The Hard-Ons
- Jul 5: Busby Marou
- Jul 12: Aborted
- Jul 19: Irvine Welsh
- Aug 2: HTRK
- Aug 16: Psycroptic
- Aug 23: Violent Soho
- Sep 6: 360
- Sep 13: Royal Blood
- Sep 20: Cris Kirkwood from Meat Puppets
- Oct 4: Jimmy Barnes
- Oct 11: Megan Washington
- Oct 18: Kristian Nairn
- Oct 25: Deniz Tek and Jim Dickson from Radio Birdman
- Nov 1: Josie Scott and Kim Scott from The Mark of Cain
- Nov 8: Kasey Chambers
- Nov 15: The Madden Brothers
- Nov 22: I Killed the Prom Queen
- Nov 29: Russell Morris
- Dec 6: Anthony Fantano
- Dec 13: Iceage
- Dec 20: Jack Ladder

=== 2015 ===
- Feb 7: The Meanies
- Feb 21: Dan Deacon
- Feb 28: Neneh Cherry
- Mar 7: Perfume Genius
- Mar 14: Alt-J
- Mar 21: Run the Jewels
- Mar 28: British India
- Apr 4: Caribou
- Apr 11: Judas Priest
- Apr 18: Sharon Van Etten
- Apr 25: Noel Fielding
- May 2: Millencolin
- May 9: Glass Animals
- May 16: Tony Hadley and Gary Kemp from Spandau Ballet
- May 23: Jebediah
- May 30: ASAP Ferg
- Jun 6: The Pop Group
- Jun 13: Giorgio Moroder
- Jun 20: Craig Nicholls from the Vines
- Jul 4: King Parrot
- Jul 11: Thelma Plum
- Jul 25: Northlane
- Aug 8: Seth Sentry
- Aug 15: Alpine
- Aug 22: Dead Letter Circus
- Aug 29: Tumbleweed
- Sep 5: Daniel Johns
- Sep 12: The Church
- Sep 19: The Rubens
- Sep 26: Kevin Smith and Jason Mewes
- Oct 3: Parkway Drive
- Oct 10: The Smith Street Band
- Oct 17: Hermitude
- Oct 24: Joey Badass
- Oct 31: 5 Seconds of Summer
- Nov 7: My Disco
- Nov 14: Tina Arena
- Nov 21: Robert Forster
- Dec 5: The Clean
- Dec 12: Costa Georgiadis
- Dec 19: King Gizzard and the Lizard Wizard

=== 2016 ===
- Feb 6: Royal Headache
- Feb 13: Mac DeMarco
- Feb 20: City and Colour
- Feb 27: Courtney Barnett, Jen Cloher and Fraser A. Gorman
- Mar 12: DMA's
- Mar 19: Neon Indian
- Apr 2: Ariel Pink
- Apr 9: Custard
- Apr 16: Health
- Apr 23: Noel Fielding (repeat of the 25 April 2015 episode)
- May 7: Ganggajang
- May 21: Kate Ceberano
- May 28: Cherie Currie from the Runaways
- Jun 4: The Drones
- Jun 11: Twin Peaks
- Jun 18: Hiatus Kaiyote
- Jul 2: Steel Panther
- Jul 9: Southeast Desert Metal
- Jul 16: MS MR
- Jul 23: Deafheaven
- Aug 6: Gypsy & the Cat
- Aug 13: Recovery hosted by Dylan Lewis & Jane Gazzo
- Aug 20: Bernard Fanning
- Aug 27: James Vincent McMorrow
- Sep 10: Grouplove
- Sep 17: Remi
- Oct 1: Sticky Fingers
- Oct 8: Totally Unicorn
- Oct 15: Lisa Mitchell
- Oct 29: Empire of the Sun
- Nov 5: Tkay Maidza
- Nov 12: David Wilson
- Nov 19: Ben Lee
- Nov 26: Illy
- Dec 3: Marilyn Manson, Wiz Khalifa and Connan Mockasin (compilation of half-finished, previously unaired guest-programming slots)
- Dec 10: Shirley Manson, Steve Marker & Duke Erikson from Garbage
- Dec 17: Eric Andre

=== 2017 ===
- Feb 4: Dune Rats
- Feb 11: Twelve Foot Ninja
- Feb 18: The xx
- Feb 25: Peter Garrett and Jim Moginie from Midnight Oil
- Mar 11: Holly Throsby
- Mar 18: A Day to Remember
- Mar 25: Scott Hutchison and Grant Hutchison from Frightened Rabbit
- Apr 1: Thundamentals
- Apr 8: Catfish and the Bottlemen
- Apr 29: James Mercer from the Shins
- May 6: Underground Lovers
- May 13: Kingswood
- May 20: Tom Meighan from Kasabian
- May 27: All Time Low
- Jun 3: The Clouds
- Jun 10: Bad Dreems
- Jun 17: Suggs of Madness
- Jul 1: El Guincho
- Jul 8: Amanda Brown and Lindy Morrison of the Go-Betweens
- Jul 15: Meg Mac
- Jul 22: Kirin J. Callinan
- Aug 5: Warren Fu
- Aug 12: Hanson
- Aug 19: Corey Taylor of Slipknot and Stone Sour
- Aug 26: Steve Lucas of X
- Sep 2: Gang of Youths
- Sep 9: Spoon
- Sep 16: The Preatures
- Sep 23: Dominic and Stuart from Mogwai
- Sep 30: Ron Peno and Brett Myers from Died Pretty
- Oct 7: The Jungle Giants
- Oct 14: Future Islands
- Nov 4: Cub Sport
- Nov 18: Whitfield Crane from Ugly Kid Joe
- Nov 25: Pete Tong
- Dec 2: Daryl Braithwaite from Sherbet
- Dec 9: Melvins
- Dec 16: San Cisco
- Dec 23: Pissed Jeans

=== 2018 ===
- Feb 3: DZ Deathrays
- Feb 10: Craig David
- Feb 17: Hockey Dad
- Feb 24: The Stems
- Mar 3: Vance Joy
- Mar 10: Kerser
- Mar 17: Phoenix
- Mar 24: Wolf Alice
- Apr 7: Aunty Donna
- Apr 14: Donny Benét
- Apr 21: Ruban Nielson from Unknown Mortal Orchestra
- May 5: Parkway Drive
- May 12: Alison Wonderland
- May 19: Courtney Barnett
- May 26: Peking Duk
- Jun 9: Chuck D, Tim Commerford and DJ Lord from Prophets of Rage
- Jun 16: The Presets
- Jun 23: The Mavis's
- Jun 30: Camp Cope
- Jul 7: Luca Brasi
- Jul 21: Amy Shark
- Aug 4: Alice Glass
- Aug 11: Painters and Dockers
- Aug 18: Franz Ferdinand
- Aug 25: Osher Günsberg
- Sep 1: Neko Case
- Sep 8: Trent Reznor from Nine Inch Nails (repeat of the 6 February 2000 episode)
- Sep 15: The Amity Affliction
- Sep 29: Ed Kuepper and Peter Oxley from the Aints!
- Oct 6: The Screaming Jets
- Oct 13: Tom Morello from Rage Against the Machine & the Nightwatchman & Prophets of Rage
- Oct 20: Mojo Juju
- Nov 3: Todd Rundgren
- Nov 10: Rüfüs Du Sol
- Nov 17: Charli XCX
- Nov 24: Kirkis

=== 2019 ===
- Feb 16: Methyl Ethel
- Feb 23: Tex Perkins & Kim Salmon from The Beasts (formerly Beasts of Bourbon)
- Mar 9: Little Simz
- Mar 16: Joan Jett and Kenny Laguna
- Mar 23: Nergal from Behemoth
- Mar 30: Parquet Courts
- Apr 6: Sum 41
- Apr 13: Anderson .Paak
- Apr 20: Dan Sultan
- Apr 27: Ian Hill, Richie Faulkner & Scott Travis of Judas Priest
- May 4: Paul Mac
- May 11: J Mascis of Dinosaur Jr.
- May 25: The Veronicas
- Jun 1: Jimmy Barnes
- Jun 8: Idles
- Jun 15: Aurora
- Jun 22: Tobias Forge
- Jun 29: Carl Cox and Eric Powell
- Jul 6: Bring Me the Horizon
- Jul 13: Bad Apples Music
- Jul 20: Christine and the Queens
- Aug 3: Hilltop Hoods
- Aug 10: Seeker Lover Keeper
- Aug 17: Killswitch Engage
- Aug 24: Jungle
- Aug 31: Nathaniel Rateliff & the Night Sweats
- Sep 7: Thrice
- Sep 14: The Chats
- Sep 28: Murray Burns, Don Martin & Steve Balbi from Mi-Sex
- Oct 5: Regurgitator
- Oct 12: Boy & Bear
- Oct 19: Ride
- Oct 26: Devin Townsend
- Nov 2: Amyl and the Sniffers
- Nov 9: Richard Lowenstein
- Nov 16: Paul Kelly
- Nov 23: Jessica Mauboy
- Nov 30: The Murlocs
- Dec 7: Adam Franklin from Swervedriver
- Dec 14: Apocalyptica

=== 2020 ===
- Feb 8: Denzel Curry
- Feb 15: Amanda Palmer
- Feb 22: Polaris
- Mar 7: Lzzy Hale & Joe Hottinger from Halestorm
- Mar 21: The Dandy Warhols
- Mar 28: Weyes Blood
- Apr 4: Milky Chance
- Apr 18: Ed O'Brien from Radiohead
- May 2: Alex Cameron & Roy Molloy
- May 9: Mike Patton & Faith No More (compilation of previous guest programming slots from 1990, 1995, 1997, 2007 & 2013)
- May 16: Sleaford Mods
- May 23: TISM (25th anniversary repeat of 20 May 1995 episode)
- Jun 6: Mark McEntee from Divinyls
- Jun 20: Lagwagon
- Jun 27: Even
- Jul 4: Slipknot (20th anniversary repeat of 18 March 2000 episode)
- Jul 18: I Prevail
- Jul 25: The Naked and Famous
- Aug 1: Garbage (repeat of 13 November 1999 episode to mark 25th anniversary of the band's first album)
- Aug 15: David McCormack from Custard
- Aug 29: Dave Grohl & Franz Stahl from Foo Fighters (repeat of 21 March 1998 episode)
- Sep 12: Marilyn Manson (repeat programming slots from 6 February 1999 and 3 December 2016)
- Sep 26: Orbital
- Oct 3: No Doubt (20th anniversary repeat of 3 June 2000 episode)
- Oct 17: Tommy Lee from Mötley Crüe
- Oct 24: Ball Park Music
- Oct 31: Alice Cooper (repeat of 8 October 2011 episode to mark Halloween)
- Nov 14: Briggs
- Nov 21: Ruel
- Nov 28: Something for Kate
- Dec 6: Nat's What I Reckon
- Dec 12: Julien Temple (introducing music videos directed by him)

=== 2021 ===
- Jan 23: Metallica (compilation of programming slots from 1991, 1996 & 2004 to mark the band's 40th anniversary)
- Jan 31: Psychedelic Porn Crumpets
- Mar 5: Michael Gudinski (Tribute to guest programmer done in 2014 never gone to air before on rage)
- Mar 13: Genesis Owusu
- Mar 20: Sarah McLeod
- Mar 27: Amy Lee from Evanescence
- Apr 3: The Mars Volta (repeat of 23 Aug 2008 episode)
- Apr 10: Tex Perkins and Kim Salmon from the Beasts, formerly Beasts of Bourbon (repeat of Feb 23 2019 episode in tribute to late drummer Tony Pola)
- Apr 24: William Zeglis from the Rubens
- May 1: Julia Stone
- May 15: Tim Rogers from You Am I
- May 29: Amy Shark
- June 5: Crowded House
- June 12: Noel Gallagher
- June 19: The Avalanches
- June 26: Theo and Joel from Wolf Alice
- July 3: Middle Kids
- July 17: Mike D, Ad-Rock & Adam Yauch from Beastie Boys (compilation of programming slots from 1994 & 2007 to mark group's 40th anniversary)
- July 26: Gary Numan
- July 31: Sam Hales from the Jungle Giants
- Aug 7: Southeast Desert Metal (repeat of 9 July 2016 episode)
- Aug 14: Polish Club
- Aug 21: Sonic Youth (compilation of programming slots from 1998 & 2004 to mark group's 40th anniversary)
- Aug 28: Chvrches
- Sept 4: Tropical Fuck Storm
- Sept 11: Jack Ladder
- Sept 18: Archie Roach
- Oct 16: Matt Tuck from Bullet for My Valentine
- Oct 23: The Wiggles
- Oct 30: John Carpenter (Halloween special)
- Nov 6: Rüfüs Du Sol
- Nov 13: Courtney Barnett
- Nov 20: Miami Horror
- Nov 27: Alice Skye
- Dec 4: Ladyhawke
- Dec 11: De La Soul (20th anniversary repeat of 22 Dec 2001 episode)

=== 2022 ===
- Jan 1: Crowded House (repeat from June 5, 2021)
- Jan 8: Julia Stone (repeat from May 1, 2021)
- Jan 15: Archie Roach (repeat from September 18, 2021)
- Jan 22: Genesis Owusu (repeat from March 13, 2021)
- Jan 29: Ocean Alley
- Feb 5: Meat Loaf (excerpts from June 26, 2010, episode as part of tribute special)
- Feb 25: Mark Lanegan & Van Conner from Screaming Trees (excerpts from 22 April 1995 episode in tribute to Mark Lanegan)
- Mar 13: Kate Miller-Heidke
- Mar 19: Gavin Rossdale from Bush
- Mar 26: Dave Faulkner from Hoodoo Gurus
- Apr 2: Confidence Man
- Apr 9: Hugo Gruzman from Flight Facilities
- Apr 16: The Linda Lindas
- Apr 30: Marcus Bridge from Northlane
- May 7: Pierre Bouvier from Simple Plan
- May 14: Peking Duk
- May 28: Camp Cope
- June 4: Hiatus Kaiyote
- June 18: The Lazy Eyes
- June 25: George Pettit from Alexisonfire
- July 9: Tasman Keith
- July 16: Stand Atlantic
- July 24: Phil Jamieson
- Aug 6: King Stingray
- Aug 13: Spacey Jane
- Aug 20: Orville Peck
- Aug 27: Isabella Manfredi
- Sept 3: The Hu
- Sept 17: Winston McCall from Parkway Drive
- Sept 24: Sampa the Great
- Oct 1: Tegan & Sara
- Oct 8: Darren Hayes
- Oct 15: Benee
- Oct 22: Beabadoobee
- Oct 30: Jacoby Shaddix from Papa Roach (Halloween special)
- Nov 5: Eskimo Joe
- Nov 12: Spiderbait
- Nov 19: TISM
- Nov 26: Emma Donovan & the Putbacks
- Dec 3: Alter Boy

=== 2023 ===
- Jan 14: Kate Miller-Heidke (repeat from 13 March 2022)
- Jan 21: Dave Faulkner from Hoodoo Gurus (repeat from 26 March 2022)
- Jan 28: King Stingray (repeat from 6 Aug 2022)
- Mar 3: Alexis Taylor & Owen Clarke from Hot Chip
- Mar 11: The Beths
- Mar 18: Fontaines D.C.
- Mar 25: Mo'Ju
- Apr 1: DMA's
- Apr 15: Pennywise
- Apr 22: Kimbra
- Apr 29: Jen Cloher
- May 6: Supergrass (compilation of guest-programming spots from 1997 & 2002 to mark group's 30th anniversary)
- May 12: Kate Ceberano
- May 20: Fidlar
- May 27: Steve Kilbey
- June 3: Katy Steele
- June 10: Jay Whalley & Lindsay McDougall from Frenzal Rhomb
- June 17: Bad Dreems
- June 24: Heather Baron-Gracie, Hugo Silvani & Charlie Wood from Pale Waves
- July 1: Nicholas Allbrook
- July 8: Tia Gostelow
- July 15: Obongjayar
- July 22: Lastlings
- Aug 5: Thundercat
- Aug 19: Xenoyr, Tim Charles & Matt Klavins from Ne Obliviscaris
- Aug 26: Paul Goldman
- Sep 2: Cam Baines, Tom Read & Shane Wakker from Bodyjar
- Sep 9: Jimmy Rees
- Sep 16: Felix Riebl, Ollie McGill & Neda Rahmani from the Cat Empire
- Sep 23: Georgia
- Sep 30: Fatman Scoop
- Oct 7: Oneohtrix Point Never
- Oct 14: Arlo Parks
- Oct 28: Cerrone
- Nov 4: Marcia Hines
- Nov 11: Tkay Maidza
- Nov 18: RVG
- Nov 25: Jack River
- Dec 2: Ollie Olsen
- Dec 10: Mark Arm, Steve Turner & Guy Maddison from Mudhoney

=== 2024 ===
- Jan 13: Blink 182 (repeat of 27 June 1998 episode)
- Jan 20: Courtney Barnett (repeat of 13 November 2021 episode)
- Mar 2: Courtney Act (Mardi Gras special)
- Mar 9: Sharleen Spiteri from Texas
- Mar 16: Gaz Coombes
- Mar 23: Royel Otis
- Mar 30: Hole (25th anniversary repeat of 20 February 1999 episode)
- Apr 6: San Cisco
- Apr 13: Brendan B. Brown from Wheatus
- Apr 20: Braxe + Falcon
- May 4: Lydia Lunch + Joseph Keckler
- May 11: The Dead South
- May 18: Rob Younger & Jim Dickson from Radio Birdman
- May 25: Donny Benet
- Jun 1: Boris
- Jun 8: Olympia
- Jun 15: 1300
- Jun 29: Jimeoin
- Jul 6: 3%
- Jul 13: Fanning Dempsey National Park
- Jul 27: Lime Cordiale
- Aug 3: Callan Purcell, Vidya Makan and Jason Arrow from the cast of Hamilton
- Aug 10: Mildlife
- Aug 17: Allday
- Aug 24: Angie McMahon
- Aug 31: Dune Rats
- Sept 7: Christine Anu
- Sept 14: Ride
- Sept 21: Keith Urban
- Sept 28: Jamie xx
- Oct 5: Sofi Tukker
- Oct 12: Chloé Hayden & Bryn Chapman Parish from Heartbreak High
- Oct 26: Amyl and the Sniffers
- Nov 2: Missy Higgins
- Nov 9: Emily Wurramara
- Nov 23: Iva Davies
- Nov 30: Sarah Blasko

=== 2025 ===
- Jan 4: Lydia Lunch and Joseph Keckler (repeat of guest programmer from 4 May 2024)
- Jan 10: Lily Allen (repeat of guest programmer from 21 Oct 2006)
- Jan 18: Keith Urban (repeat of guest programmer from 21 Sept 2024)
- Jan 25: Andre 3000 from Outkast (repeat of guest programmer from 26 Jun 2004)
- Mar 1: Electric Fields (Mardi Gras Special)
- Mar 8: Claudia Sangiorgi Dalimore
- Mar 15: Leon Bridges
- Mar 22: Partiboi69
- Mar 29: Mallrat
- Apr 5: Cyndi Lauper (repeat of guest programmer from 7 August 2004)
- Apr 12: Jem Cassar-Daley
- Apr 19: Old Mervs
- Apr 26: Ela Minus
- May 3: The Offspring
- May 10: Ball Park Music
- May 17: Psychedelic Porn Crumpets
- May 25: The Preatures
- May 31: Bliss n Eso
- Jun 7: Skeleten
- Jun 14: Killing Heidi
- Jun 21: Death from Above 1979
- Jun 28: Jay Watson & Ambrose Kenny-Smith
- Jul 5: Soccer Mommy
- Jul 12: Mandawuy Yunupingu from Yothu Yindi (repeat of guest programmer from 3 Jan 1992 for NAIDOC Week)
- Jul 19: Marlon Williams
- Jul 26: Folk Bitch Trio
- Aug 2: Montaigne
- Aug 9: Ninajirachi
- Aug 16: DIIV
- Aug 23: Gordi
- Aug 30: The Used
- Sept 6: Howlin' Pelle Almqvist, Nicholaus Arson, Vigilante Carlstroem & Chris Dangerous from The Hives
- Sept 13: G Flip
- Sept 20: Private Function
- Sept 27: Evan Dando
- Oct 4: Brad Cox
- Oct 11: Baker Boy
- Oct 18: Ruel
- Oct 25: Paris Texas
- Nov 1: Noasis
- Nov 8: Hatchie
- Nov 15: Teen Jesus and the Jean Teasers
- Nov 22: bbno$
- Nov 29: Sharon Van Etten & The Attachment Theory
- Dec 6: Nina Las Vegas

=== 2026 ===
- Jan 3: Nile Rodgers (repeat of guest programmer from 8 Feb 2014)
- Jan 10: Tim & Eric (repeat of guest programmer from 28 Sept 2012)
- Jan 17: Joan Jett (repeat of guest programmer from 12 Feb 2011)
- Jan 24: Trent Reznor from Nine Inch Nails (repeat of guest programmer from 6 February 2000)
- Jan 31: Abby Butler and Tyrone Pynor from Triple J (Hottest 100 of 2025 Special)
- Feb 28: Ru Paul (repeat of guest programmer from 3 Sept 1994) & Scissor Sisters (repeat of guest programmer from 5 Mar 2005) (Mardi Gras Special)
- Mar 7: Rebecca Black
- Mar 14: The Last Dinner Party
- Mar 21: HAAi
- Mar 28: Black Country, New Road
- Apr 4: Peach PRC
- Apr 11: Bar Italia
- Apr 18: Matt Corby
- Apr 25: Wisp
- May 2: Melanie C
- May 9: YNG Martyr
- May 16: Michael Cavanagh from CAVS
- May 23: Water from Your Eyes
- May 30: Genesis Owusu
- Jun 20: Daniel Avery
- Jun 27: Hooligan Hefs
- Jul 4: Kita Alexander
- Jul 18: James Reyne from Australian Crawl
- Jul 25: Budjerah
- Aug 1: Jim E. Brown
- Aug 8: Eddy Current Suppression Ring
- Aug 15: Miss Kaninna
- Aug 22: Peter Hook from New Order & Joy Division
- Aug 29: Ty Segall
- Sept 5: My Chemial Romance (repeat of guest programming from 6 Feb 2006)
- Sept 12: C.O.F.F.I.N
- Sept 19: Larissa Lambert
- Sept 26: Electric Callboy
- Oct 3: Vacations
- Oct 10: King Gizzard & The Lizard Wizard
- Oct 17: Body Type
- Oct 24: Pnau
- Oct 31: Grace Cummings
- Nov 7: Party Dozen
- Nov 14: Vika & Linda
- Nov 21: Daine

== Vault Guest Programmers on ABC Entertains ==
On 3 June 2024 it was announced that rage would air every weeknight on ABC Entertains, with Friday nights featuring Vault Guest Programmers - these are hour-long cuts of original hostings with the aim of replaying guest host slots that haven't been played since they first aired.

=== 2024 ===
- Jun 7: Tom Morello (first aired 2 Sept 2006)
- Jun 14: Garbage (first aired 13 Nov 1999)
- Jun 21: Jurassic 5 (first aired 27 Apr 2002)
- Jun 28: Neneh Cherry (first aired 26 Oct 1996)
- Jul 5: Florence Welch from Florence and the Machine (first aired 20 Feb 2010)
- Jul 12: Lamb of God (first aired 31 Oct 2009)
- Jul 19: Andre 3000 from Outkast (first aired 26 Jun 2004)
- Jul 26: Grinspoon (first aired 14 Mar 1998)
- Aug 2: Lily Allen (first aired 21 Oct 2006)
- Aug 9: Max Cavalera & Andreas Kisser from Sepultura (first aired 10 Sept 1994)
- Aug 16: The xx (first aired 8 Sept 2012)
- Aug 23: Geoff Barrow from Portishead (first aired 25 Feb 2012)
- Aug 30: Noel Gallagher (first aired 12 June 2021)
- Sep 6: Fatman Scoop (tribute to Fatman Scoop that first aired on 30 Sept 2023)
- Sep 13: Tori Amos (first aired 25 Jun 2005)
- Sep 20: Siouxsie & the Banshees (first aired 9 Oct 1993)
- Sept 27: The Used (first aired 11 Jun 2005)
- Oct 4: The Go! Team (first aired 8 Apr 2006)
- Oct 11: Killing Heidi (first aired 18 Dec 1999)
- Oct 18: At the Drive-In (first aired 28 Apr 2001)
- Oct 24: Slipknot (first aired 18 Mar 2000)
- Nov 1: TISM (first aired 20 May 1995)
- Nov 8: Skulker (first aired 29 Nov 2003)
- Nov 16: Paul Drane (first aired in 2016)
- Nov 22: Jessica Mauboy (first aired 11 Jul 2009)
- Nov 29: Gerling (first aired 22 May 1999)
- Dec 6: Billy Corgan from the Smashing Pumpkins (first aired 27 Aug 2005)
- Dec 13: Julian Lennon (first aired 9 May 1992)
- Dec 20: Lauryn Hill, Wyclef Jean and Pras Michel from the Fugees (first aired 8 Feb 1997)
- Dec 27: Lemmy from Motörhead (first aired 22 Jun 1991)

=== 2025 ===
- Jan 3: William and Jim Reid from The Jesus and Mary Chain (first aired 17 Jun 1995)
- Jan 10: Layne Staley from Alice in Chains (first aired 27 Jan 1994)
- Jan 17: The Donnas (first aired 12 Mar 2005)
- Jan 24: Franz Ferdinand (first aired 31 Jul 2004)
- Jan 31: Dizzee Rascal (first aired 15 Mar 2008)
- Feb 7: Charli XCX (first aired 17 Nov 2018)
- Feb 14: The Prodigy (first aired 16 Mar 1996)
- Feb 21: DJ Shadow (first aired 12 Aug 2006)
- Feb 28: RuPaul (first aired 3 Sept 1994)
- Mar 7: Green Day (first aired 25 Apr 1998)
- Mar 14: The Kills (first aired 19 Sept 2009)
- Mar 21: Gotye (first aired 1 Sept 2012)
- Mar 28: Silverchair (first aired 9 Sept 1995)
- Apr 4: The Pharcyde (first aired 15 Sept 2012)
- Apr 11: Cansei De Ser Sexy (first aired 2 May 2009)
- Apr 18: Blondie (tribute to Clem Burke that first aired on 6 Sept 2003)
- Apr 24: Veruca Salt (first aired 25 Oct 1997)
- May 3: Four Tet (first aired 3 Oct 2009)
- May 9: Slayer (first aired 19 Dec 1998)
- May 16: Architecture In Helsinki (first aired 18 Feb 2012)
- May 23: Beck (first aired 27 Aug 1994)
- May 30: Cloud Control (first aired 10 Aug 2013)
- Jun 6: Jungle Brothers (first aired 24 Jul 2004)
- Jun 13: The Strokes (first aired 24 Dec 2005)
- Jun 20: Yeah Yeah Yeahs (first aired 20 May 2003)
- Jun 27: Faithless (first aired 1 Jun 2002)
- Jul 4: Devo (first aired 8 Nov 1997)
- Jul 11: Troy Cassar-Daley (first aired 10 July 2010)
- Jul 18: Coldplay (first aired 24 Feb 2001)
- Jul 25: Blood Orange (first aired 11 Aug 2012)
- Aug 1: David Byrne (first aired 30 Mar 2002)
- Aug 8: Karl Hyde from Underworld [first aired 8 Feb 2003)
- Aug 15: Grimes (first aired 23 Feb 2013)
- Aug 22: Margaret Pomeranz and David Stratton (tribute to David Stratton that first aired on 16 Feb 2013)
- Aug 29: Bloc Party (first aired 3 Sept 2005)
- Sept 5: Peaches (first aired 24 Mar 2007)
- Sept 12: Powderfinger (first aired 2 Sept 2000)
- Sept 19: Basement Jaxx (first aired 16 Mar 2002)
- Sept 26: Beach House (first aired 23 Mar 2013)
- Oct 3: Sugar Ray (first aired 29 Apr 2000)
- Oct 10: Tina Arena (first aired 14 Nov 2015)
- Oct 17: Shavo & John from System Of A Down (first aired 9 Mar 2002)
- Oct 24: M.I.A. (first aired 26 Mar 2006)
- Oct 31: Animal Collective (first aired 3 Apr 2010)
- Nov 7: Paul Kelly (first aired 16 Nov 2019)
- Nov 14: Jimmy Barnes (first aired 4 Oct 2014)
- Nov 21: Magic Dirt (first aired 17 May 1997)
- Nov 28: The Avalanches (first aired 9 Dec 2000)
- Dec 5: Maynard & Danny from Tool (first aired 6 May 2006)
- Dec 12: No Doubt (first aired 3 Jun 2000)
- Dec 19: The Prodigy (first aired 16 Mar 1996)
- Dec 26: The Kills (first aired 19 Sept 2009)

=== 2026 ===
- Jan 2: Devo (first aired 8 Nov 1997)
- Jan 9: Veruca Salt (first aired 25 Oct 1997)
- Jan 16: Faithless (first aired 1 June 2002)
- Jan 23: Britt Daniel from Spoon (first aired 22 Oct 2005)
- Jan 30: St. Vincent (first aired 24 May 2014)
- Feb 6: The Herd (first aired 20 Sept 2008)
- Feb 13: Les Claypool from Primus (first aired 23 May 1998)
- Feb 20: Cake (first aired 15 Nov 1997)
- Feb 27: Haim (first aired 24 Aug 2013)
- Mar 6: Jim Kerr from Simple Minds (first aired 13 Apr 2013)
- Mar 13: Andrew W.K. (first aired 23 March 2002)
- Mar 20: Linkin Park (first aired 16 Jun 2001)
- Mar 27: Handsome Boy Modeling School (first aired 18 Jun 2005)
- Apr 3: Opeth (first aired 15 Jun 2013)
- Apr 10: Steel Panther (first aired 2 Jun 2016)
- Apr 17: Datarock (first aired 13 May 2006)
- Apr 29: Anthrax (first aired 29 May 2004)
- May 1: Anthony Fantano (first aired 6 Dec 2014)
- May 8: Sneaky Sound System (first went to air 6 Aug 2011)
- May 15: Deftones (first aired 26 Apr 2003)
- May 22: Mogwai (first aired 14 Dec 2002)
- May 29: Chairlift (first aired 7 Apr 2012)
- Jun 5: Groove Armada (first aired 18 May 2002)
- Jun 12: Amiel (first aired 16 Aug 2003)
- Jun 19: Xzibit (first aired 8 Mar 2003)
- Jun 26: Midnight Juggernauts (first aired 20 Nov 2010)
- Jul 3: Beth Orton (first aired 1 Apr 2000)
- Jul 10: Noel Fielding (first aired 25 Apr 2015)
- Jul 17: Operator Please (first aired 22 May 2010)
- Jul 24: Bloodhound Gang (first aired 1 Nov 1997)
- Jul 31: OK Go (first aired 31 Jul 2010)
- Aug 7: The Grates (first aired 13 Dec 2008)
- Aug 14: Fatboy Slim (first aired 11 Nov 2000)
- Aug 20: Sleater Kinney (first aired 31 May 2003)
- Aug 28: Derry Brownson from EMF (first aired 21 Sept 1991)
- Sept 4: Shaun Ryder from Happy Mondays (first aired 24 March 2001)
- Sept 11: Violent Soho (first aired 23 Aug 2014)
- Sept 18: Bajo and Hex from "Good Game" (first aired 19 Jun 2010)
- Sept 25: Tame Impala (first aired 6 Oct 2012)
- Oct 2: Scribe (first aired 4 Jun 2005)
- Oct 9: Cat Power (first aired 23 Sept 2003)
- Oct 16: Korn (first aired 23 May 1997)
- Oct 23: MGMT (First aired 7 Feb 2009)
- Oct 30: Lily Allen (first aired 21 Oct 2006)
- Nov 6: Kasey Chambers (first aired 28 Sept 2002)
- Nov 13: Bluejuice (first aired 3 Mar 2010)
- Nov 20: Dave Grohl & Franz Stahl from Foo Fighters (first aired 28 Mar 1998)
