= Rock Arena =

Australian music television show (1982–1989)

Rock Arena was a weekly Australian music television show broadcast by the ABC from 23 February 1982 until 31 January 1989. The program featured live music performances, and interviews with bands and singers. The performances were presented as if the artist was in a pub or in concert.

Rock Arena was hosted by Andrew Peters, Suzanne Dowling, Peter Holland and Glenn Shorrock. The executive producer was Grant Rule and the vision mixer was Joe Murray.

== See also ==
- List of Australian music television shows
- List of Australian television series
- List of programs broadcast by ABC (Australian TV network)
- Countdown
