= Rage (TV program) =

Australian music video program

- Genre: Music, Arts
- Created by: Mark FitzGerald; Stephanie Lewis
- Presented by: List of Rage guest programmers
- Opening theme: "Real Wild Child" by Iggy Pop
- Ending theme: "Speed Your Love to Me" by Simple Minds
- Country of origin: Australia
- Original language: English
- No. of series: 38

Production
- Production locations: Sydney, New South Wales
- Running time: ABC TV; Friday to Saturday; 10–12 hours Saturday to Sunday; 6.5 hours Weekday nights Varies intermittently ABC Entertains; 1 hour (Everyday)

Original release
- Network: ABC TV; ABC Entertains
- Release: 17 April 1987 – present

Rage (stylised as rage) is an all-night Australian music video program broadcast on ABC TV on Friday nights, Saturday mornings and Saturday nights. It was first screened on the weekend of Friday, 17 April 1987. With Soul Train and Video Hits no longer being produced, it is one of the oldest music television programs in the world currently still in production as of 2026.

On Friday and Saturday nights, Rage typically starts between 11:00pm and 1:00am local time. The program is classified MA15+ until 5:00am, where it is rated PG from 5:00 to 11:00am on Saturday mornings, and at 7:00am on Sundays.

== Format ==
Rage has a minimalist format which has remained largely unchanged since the program's inception. Originally created by executive producer Mark FitzGerald in early 1987, the program was originally proposed to be titled rage 'til you puke, but which was shortened to rage, as this was deemed more likely to be acceptable to the ABC board. It debuted in April 1987, the same month as MTV Australia debuted as a late night program on the Nine Network and two months after Video Hits debuted on Network Ten.

The first five music videos shown on rage were "Weirdo Libido" by the Lime Spiders, "(You Gotta) Fight For Your Right (To Party)" by The Beastie Boys, “You Really Got Me” by The Kinks, “C'mon Every Beatbox” by Big Audio Dynamite and “Tonight, Tonight, Tonight” by Genesis.

Rage was given an idiosyncratic and alternative flavour by music programmers and producers Stephanie Lewis (1987 to 1995) and Narelle Gee (1995 to 2008).

Prior to 1989, rage frequently dedicated large amounts of airtime to individual artists and musical styles, often playing an artist's entire catalogue of videos. From 1989 this became more structured with Saturday night specials being introduced, with rage showing every music video from a nominated artist each Saturday night, usually in chronological order. The first artist featured was Madonna, on 6 May 1989. Other early specials included Midnight Oil, The Cult, The The, Public Image Ltd., Tears for Fears, Scrap Metal, Mental As Anything, Crowded House, Paul Kelly, The Beatles, Hoodoo Gurus, Eurythmics, INXS and Split Enz, plus heavy metal and country music specials.

Guest programmers, who choose the videos aired for an episode, were introduced in January 1990. Mark Fitzgerald and then-programmer Stephanie Lewis came up with the idea along with musician Damien Lovelock. The guest presenters are usually musical artists from Australia or international artists if they happen to be touring Australia, but not always. The ABC presenter Andrew Denton, who is not a musician, was the first guest programmer. Other non-musician guest programmers have included politicians, music video directors (e.g. Richard Lowenstein), and even members of the public. Following the guest programmer’s video selection, rage would then typically show all or most of the music videos by that guest programmer, provided they are a musical artist.

With Saturday nights being dedicated to specials and guest programmers, Friday nights became increasingly devoted to new releases and has been almost exclusively such since 1995, showing a range of music genres. Exceptions to this are often made when a well-known musician dies, and rage will play a tribute to that musician by opening Friday night’s show with a selection of their videos, bookended by simple white-on-black “In Memory Of” text graphics with the artist’s name and years of life.

The only time a host is seen on rage speaking to the camera is when guest programmers appear on the Saturday night edition. Otherwise, the videos are run end-to-end in full and with no voiceovers, with segments only broken up with a quick branding clip or the rage logo accompanied by a voice that simply says "rage!". A "crawl" is also sometimes used during the program, with details of upcoming Specials and Guest Programmers printed in text at the bottom of the screen during a short snippet of a selected clip.

The titling on the videos is also very simple, with the artist and song name displayed briefly after the rage logo near the beginning of each video (originally only the artist was identified). Historically, no other graphics, logos or watermarks appear over the clip as it played, but as of 25 June 2010, Kath Earle, Executive Producer with ABC Arts & Entertainment, stated that the Director of Television and Head of Marketing have decided to watermark rage to "maintain consistency across the network" as all other programs are watermarked.

On Fridays, when new and recent releases are played, rage often gives airtime to little-heard-of new names in the very early hours of Saturday morning. During his John Safran's Music Jamboree series, John Safran successfully demonstrated "...even a dog can get a video on rage", by attaching a video camera to a dog, and editing the resulting footage together with simply produced looping music.

From 1988, rage aired the Australian Top 50 music chart on Saturday and Sunday mornings. Between July 1993 and early 1995, rage aired a separate "new releases" program weekly from 2:00am to 4:00am on a Friday morning. However in mid-2006 this practice ceased.

The Saturday night editions, if not guest programmed, are often themed, such as by showing a large amount of an established artist's work or a collection of music videos related to a particular topic or event, such as the Sydney Gay and Lesbian Mardi Gras or NAIDOC Week.

Another theme in summer, started in 2004, is to replay historic music television programmes including Countdown (from the 1970s and '80s), Rock Arena (from the '80s), Recovery (from the '90s), GTK (1970s), Flashez (1970s) and Beatbox (1980s). This theme is called "Retro Month" and occurred in January from 2004 to 2020, and then was moved to February from 2021.

From November 2015, 'vault' episodes of rage aired on a new programme on Monday nights on ABC, where older music videos are shown. These episodes are often focused around a theme, such as a particular artist, musical genre, record label, country of origin, music video director, or a specific year of release. In March 2023, ‘vault’ episodes were moved to Sunday night.

Because the show usually starts on one day and ends on the next, it is ambiguous as to which day the show belongs. The producers have decided that even if it begins after midnight, its identity belongs to the earlier day (Friday or Saturday) even though the majority of the show (if not all) will be on the later day. This is most likely because television guides in Australia start and end each day at 6:00am.

== Top Fifty/Broadcasts on other ABC TV channels ==
Prior to 2006, from around 5:00am or 6:00am to 9:00am on Saturday mornings and 4am to the end of show on Sundays, Rage would switch to the weekly Top Fifty from the ARIA singles chart. Rage aired the Top 60 chart from 1 September 1990 to 9 March 1991, and from 8 June 1991 to 6 March 1994. If a video from the Top Fifty was unavailable, unsuitable or non-existent, it would be replaced by a splash screen of the Rage logo with the position attained in the charts for the week, the artist's name and the track's title. Also, the videos shown until 6:00am were uncensored (after this, the rating was set back to G-rated material). However, some clips were unavailable in that form, particularly due to heavier restrictions on clips which originated in the United States. Sometimes, two different video clips for the same song were shown in the one session. When this happens, it was often a live (or sometimes remixed) version that was shown earlier in the night/morning, while the "mainstream" censored version shown after 6:00am was shown in the Top Fifty due to classification laws in Australia which prevented adult-oriented material being shown in the after-6:00am time-slot. Since 2005, Rage is classified PG when it carries over after 6:00am.

Rage has previously had to censor and remove videos which have breached advertorial and editorial guidelines for ABC TV. For example, in 1991, Adidas logos were blurred out in a music video by New Kids on the Block and in 2005 a music video by the Bratz Rock Angelz was removed due to its advertorial content. Post-2000, Rage is more liberal and lenient with censorship compared to how it was in the 1990s. For example, Rage, by their own discretion, opted to broadcast the Crazy Frog music video "Axel F" uncensored, showing the exposed penis of the frog, deeming it to be non-offensive.

From 2005, the Top Fifty was added to the then-new digital channel ABC2's programming schedule as well from 8:00am to 11:00am. The Top Fifty is also broadcast to Asia on Australia Plus and its predecessors Australia Network and Australia Plus since the 2000s and has a large cult audience in the Asia-Pacific region due to the prevalence of pop music there. It shows new release pop music videos.

The weekend of 22 and 23 July 2006 was Rage's last broadcast of the Top Fifty countdown. In its place at 10am to 11am on Saturday mornings is a preview of the upcoming guest programmer or special. Rage programming on Sunday mornings includes a mix of new and hit songs. The decision to remove the Top Fifty countdown was made by ABC management, not Rage production staff, and was soundly criticized by Rage's viewing audience, which flooded the program's official message boards with complaints. The cessation of the Top Fifty countdown was due to ARIA initiating a commercial association with a telecommunications company; as the commercialism breached ABC guidelines, the Top Fifty could therefore not continue to be shown by Rage.

In 2008 and 2009, Rage broadcast an assortment of clips on ABC2 on Saturday afternoons.

In 2011, rage on 3 is top video clips of the week as voted by the ABC3 audience to complement Stay Tuned.

Since 2012, shorter broadcasts have aired transiently overnight during the week.

Regular nightly airings of Rage for an hour on ABC3 started in July 2014, airing as the last program of the day.

Since Saturday 21 March 2015 new segment "The Chart" counts down 20 of the most popular videos from the ARIA Singles Chart. The segment also include chart predictions and appearances from some of the most popular acts of today. The Chart airs weekly on Rage from 6:00am to 8:00am Saturdays on ABC and is repeated on Sundays at 9.30pm on ABC3.

== Guest programmers ==
Rage have had many bands and artists host the show on Saturday nights. They select and introduce their favorite music videos of all time. This gives an insight into the bands' and artists' influences which are highly regarded by fans. Tapings of Rage guest programmers are not only valuable but highly sought after. Some of the guest programmers' short introductions were viewable on the Rage YouTube channel and playlists, but the channel's contents were removed in 2023. Clips from shows prior to 2019 were also removed from the Rage website on ABC.

Tex Perkins and Bernard Fanning are the most frequent guest programmers with five appearances on the Rage couch apiece. The most frequently chosen videos by guest programmers include Joy Division's Love Will Tear Us Apart, The Saints' (I'm) Stranded, Peter Gabriel's Sledgehammer and Aphex Twin's Windowlicker.

== Simulcast ==
From New Year's Eve 1992, Triple J had simulcast Rage from 1:00am to 6:00am. This ended in 2003 when Triple J introduced their new dance show The Club in the same timeslot.

Considering televisions are increasingly stereo as opposed to older mono sets, the simulcast's advantage is now moot. Digital television was also becoming popular, and digital television broadcasts can not be precisely synchronised with FM radio transmissions.

== Theme songs, opening/closing sequences and interstitials ==
The theme song used to open the show is sampled from Iggy Pop's extended version of "Real Wild Child", with Pop's vocals and the word "rage" manipulated backwards throughout. The visuals include elements of Iggy Pop's "Real Wild Child" video and footage of Johnny O'Keefe performing "Shout" at Sydney Stadium in 1959. The "Shout" clip was for many years the only surviving footage from the 1959 Australian concert film Rock 'n' Roll, until the entire film was rediscovered and rereleased in the 2020s.

The song used during the closing credits of the show is an extended remix of "Speed Your Love to Me" by Simple Minds, with visual elements borrowed from Simple Minds' videos for "Speed Your Love To Me", "Sanctify Yourself" and "Waterfront".

The Tony Levin remix of Sleepless by King Crimson has also been used as the theme song occasionally, and is generally used as an interlude between segments.

Several years ago, a third theme was produced (also based on Iggy Pop's "Real Wild Child") to break up the guest programmer or specials clips on Saturday nights (except on Saturday mornings with hits and new releases).

In the last few years, the show has been using another theme specifically for the Top Fifty, sampled from the song "She Said" by now-defunct Brisbane band Lavish. It is now used instead of the opening theme to begin the Top Fifty and replace any missing clips.

During TISM's appearance on the show, they described the traditional theme song as "...new and exciting..." and its repetition as "always stimulating ... Why see different songs when you can see this one four or five times?"

== Yearly specials ==
Up until 2009 for the last weekend of each year, Rage had two specials. On the Friday night, a selection of the preceding year's Best of videos was played. On the Saturday night, they have a selection of the year's Guest Programmers. This show started with a series of Guest Programmers introductions that were shown at the beginning of each of their shows and included them introducing a few of the videos they selected during their program, followed by one or two of their videos. In 2009, Rage launched the rage 50; a count down of the top 50 clips of the year, as voted by Rage viewers.

On New Year's Eve 1999, ABC celebrated the Millennium by broadcasting the 28-hour one-off television program 2000 Today. Due to this, Rage had a rare night off air. When the program finished at midnight on New Years Day, Rage was the first program on air.

On Sunday 31 December 2006, Rage had a New Year's Eve special starting from midnight and going until 4:30am. It played all the greatest party songs, to bring in the new year.

For the first weekend of each year, the Top 50 timeslot on Rage was used for the Top 50 songs of the previous year. This ceased from 2007 (for the Top 50 songs of 2006).

Rage usually broadcasts music videos of songs from the Triple J Hottest 100 over two nights, several weeks after the Hottest 100 broadcast in late January each year (usually sometime during March).

At the end of 2007, the ABC's satirical comedy group The Chaser hosted a New Year's Eve edition of Rage, the event being dubbed "The Chaser's War on Rage".

Rage New Year's Eve Special is shown on the ABC main channel following the ABC's New Year's Eve programming.

In 2012, Rage's Silver Jubilee, guest host Tex Perkins played featured videos of bands and artists that had been on past Rage programs.

== Anniversary specials ==
=== Tenth Anniversary special ===
On 19 April 1997, a special episode was aired to celebrate Rage's tenth anniversary. It included a selection, by year, of some of the clips that had aired on Rage in the past ten years. It also included some footage of Guest Programmers from over the years. It was repeated later that year on 20 December.

=== Twentieth Anniversary special ===
Rage's 20th anniversary occurred during April 2007. Each Saturday night, they played videos from an era in Rage's history as well as immortals (clips that were not around during the particular years but which were important and influential videos) some of which were introduced by Guest programmers. Each week was introduced by some special footage and ended with a Star Wars-style crawl saying which years would be featured the next week (except obviously the last week in which the crawl thanked everyone), and then an exploding birthday cake. It also featured stock footage of each year featured, summarising that year. It also featured a special theme song. The following is a breakdown of what was shown week by week: –

- Week 1 (7 April)
  - Tex Perkins, the only man to Guest Program Rage four times introduces the special
  - clips from 1987 to 1991
- Week 2 (14 April)
  - The "Godfather" of Rage (its original Executive Producer Mark Fitzgerald) explains how the show got started and explains the theme song. Stephanie Lewis who began the Rage Saturday night specials and the Rage guest programmers when she produced Rage, is also interviewed about the early days of the program
  - Clips from 1992 to 1996
- Week 3 (21 April)
  - Current Series Producer and Head Programmer Narelle Gee explains "a week at Rage"
  - clips from 1997 to 2001
- Week 4 (28 April)
  - The new Rage website is shown (as of 7 October 2007 is up and running) and the original one, which uses Shockwave is explained
  - clips from 2002 to 2006
  - this week also featured celebrities and festival goers throughout endorsing Rage and wishing it a happy birthday.

=== Thirtieth Anniversary special ===
Rage's 30th anniversary occurred during April 2017. The nation celebrated with a week of programming including two specially produced documentaries which explored the Australian experience of watching the show. The first celebrated the history of Rage and explored its influence on Australian music and culture. The program featured a plethora of musical talent and songs from across the decades, musicians whose work has been a mainstay of Rage but who were also viewers themselves. The second, Songs from the Red Couch: 30 Years of Guests Rage Programmers, delved into the archives to relive some classic moments from the studio. Out of the thousands of songs programmed by their guests over the years a few have been chosen multiple times.

== Real Wild Child book ==
A Rage book was released in October 2010 by ABC Books/HarperCollins Australia. The author is Narelle Gee and the book is titled Real Wild Child: An Insider's Tales from the Rage Couch. The book gives an insight behind the scenes of Rage and tells the stories of the Rage guest programmers. The back cover description poses the question, What happens when the world's biggest musical acts sit down on Australia's most famous couch?

Australian Rolling Stone magazine reviewed Real Wild Child with this description: Rage's long-time producer recounts the humorous, often slapstick events of a rage taping. She's a close observer of her subjects and she conveys almost a hundred sketches of what rock stars are like when their guard drops.

== CD and DVD releases ==
Rage has released two double compilation albums, composed of songs that are popular with the programmers.

A series of Rage music video DVDs have been released, including "The Chosen Ones", "Rage Gets Animated", "Most Chosen", "Rage in Love", "Retro Rage", "The Epic 90s", "Rage Adults Only", and "Rage Let's Dance". Some of these have been combined CD/DVD sets.

A 3-disc 30th anniversary compilation was released in 2017.

== Critical reception ==
In 2016, Junkee listed Rage at #35 in its list of the 60 greatest Australian television shows of all time. The website described Rage as an icon for Australian music fans and commended the ABC's decision to not alter the program from its original format despite it being on air for several decades.

In 2019, TV Week listed Rage at #97 in its list of the 101 greatest Australian television shows of all time, which appeared in its monthly TV Week Close Up publication. The magazine said the show has been the "go-to" for any music lover since its inception, and that while rival programs have run their course, Rage is still going strong.
