= Music television =

Genre of television programming

Music television is a type of television programming which focuses predominantly on playing music videos from recording artists, usually on dedicated television channels broadcasting on satellite, cable, or streaming platforms in any country.

Music television channels may host their own shows along charts and award prizes. Examples are Paramount-Skydance's MTV, Channel UFX (India), 4Music (UK), 40 TV (Spain), Channel V (China), VIVA (Germany, defunct), Scuzz (UK), MuchMusic (Canadian, removed years later), TeleHit (Mexico), Kerrang! TV (UK, defunct), RAC 105 TV (Catalonia), GTV (Indonesia, removed years later) VH1 (removed years later), Fuse TV (removed years later) and Palladia (now as MTV Live).

== History ==
=== Radio broadcast (1950s) ===
Prior to the 1950s, most of musical broadcasts were on a radio format. Most radio broadcasts were live music such as classical music broadcasts—for example, the NBC Symphony Orchestra. In the 1950s, three of broadcast television such as NBC, CBS, and ABC (The Big Three) sought to move their popular radio broadcasts to a television format, such as Texaco Star Theater, which went from a radio broadcast to a telecast.

As networks continued to withdraw radio for popular music broadcasting, the recording industry sought to influence sales by using television as a new vessel for promoting for their artists. The coordination between record companies and television saw the incorporation of musical acts in variety shows such as The Ed Sullivan Show (1948–1971), The Stage Show (1954–1956), and Texaco Star Theater (1948–1956). Columbia Records was the first to use this method by coordinating the release of a song on CBS's Studio One and then releasing it on audio format by the label on the next day. This practice introduced the success of the televised format for musical promotion.

Performers doing specials on variety shows also became common on television. Elvis Presley performed on numerous variety shows over the span of multiple per episodes, playing rock-and-roll music. His most controversial performance was his appearance on Texaco Star Theater where he did his now-signature dance moves of thrusting his pelvis suggestively during a performance of "You Ain't Nothing But A Hound Dog". This performance served as an opening to have younger and newer music targeted at a younger demographic; previously telecasts were typically targeted towards the adult audience.

=== Network television (1960–1980) ===
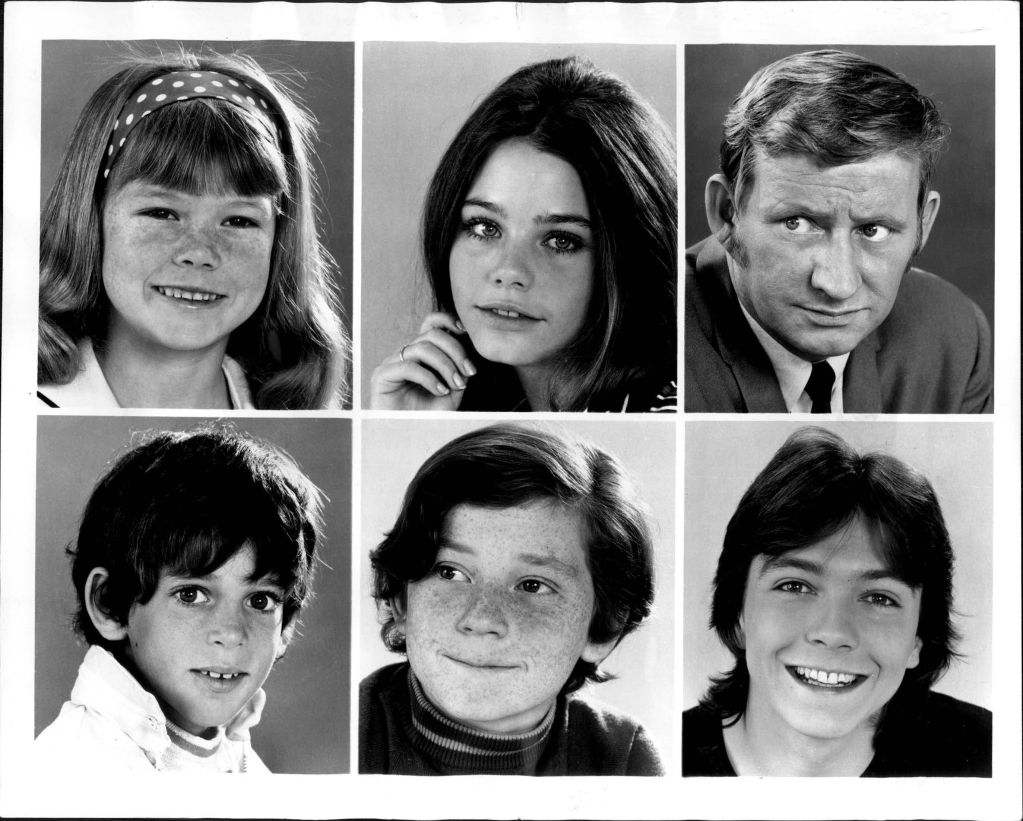
The Partridge Family cast in 1970

In the 1960s, NBC, CBS and ABC formed most of the music television market establishing themselves as the main sources for current music. A main contributor to the solidification of music broadcasting was the development of programs specifically designed to showcase music acts. This led to more technicians, set designers, producers, and directors training to specifically produce television content. The programs were of better quality than in the 1950s and gave a youthful, more dynamic look to pre-existing shows, such as The Ed Sullivan Show. The shift in production modality started to attract corporate sponsorships such as Ford, who used ad space in The Lively Ones to promote the Fairlane sedan to young-aged car buyers.

Record labels and performers in the 1960s sought to use the newly-founded, music-driven platform to introduce audiences to foreign acts such as the Beatles who performed in the US for the first time on The Ed Sullivan Show on February 9, 1964. The Beatles' performance served as the beginning of increased British influence in US popular culture. Other music-based variety programs gained popularity, including ABC's Shindig (1964–1966), and NBC's Hullaballoo (1965–1966), a rock-and-roll show targeted at distant areas' young adults. Another extension of the growth of television music can be seen in musical family acts of the 1970s such as The Monkees, The Partridge Family, The Jackson 5, and The Osmonds.

=== Cable television (1980s–2000) ===
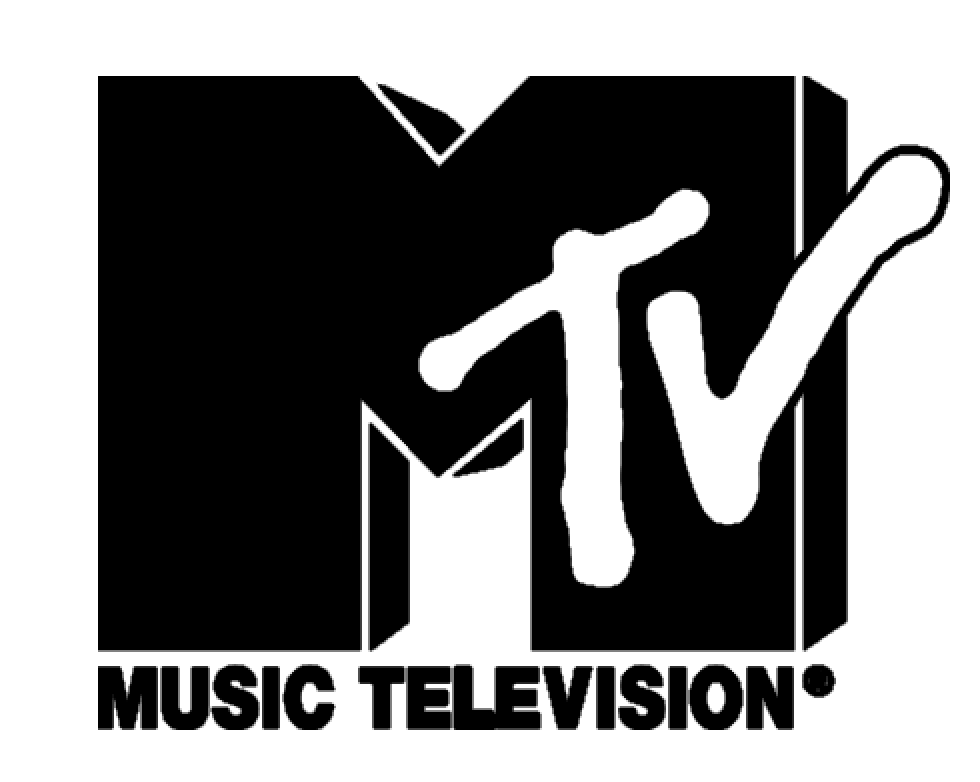
MTV logo until 2010

On March 3, 1981, Warner-Amex Satellite Entertainment (now as Paramount Media Networks) introduced MTV (Music Television), the first 24/7 cable television network completely dedicated the broadcast of music videos. MTV was aimed to reach and profit from the young adult demographic. The purpose of MTV was to reuse previously-made content by record labels for international audiences, which was free, and televise them in the USA in a top-40 hits format.

On August 1, 1981, MTV was launched with its first telecast of "Video Killed the Radio Star" by British new-wave band the Buggles. The birth of MTV reinvented the past, successful strategies by record labels, sponsors, and performers had used on variety specials. This latest network added the requirement of visual effect and video concept production to a past, mainly audio platform. This showed an influx of record labels and performers producing more high-quality videos and presenting a theme to their music and sound through visual platforms. Some record labels also decided to dedicate entire sections of their operation to music videos. In the late 1980s and early 1990s, MTV began cultivating a lifestyle for teen and college-aged students. As video clips started to develop certain images for artist, such as Madonna, Bruce Springsteen, and New Kids on The Block, fashion and paraphernalia for these acts were also marketed along with the distribution of music.

=== Digital era (2000–present) ===
In the early 2000s with the rise of digital technologies the music industry as well as the network industry sought to elevate their platform into the digital era after the decline of cable network ratings. Network television started to broadcast reality television shows that were related, not focusing on the business music acts such as MTV's Cribs, American Idol (US version of Fuller's "Pop Idol"), and NBC's America's Got Talent which drew larger audiences than music videos. Certain television networks also sought to develop and broadcast their own award shows such as the Teen Choice Awards (Fox until 2019), the MTV Video Music Awards, and the American Music Awards (ABC until 2023).

In the 2010s, MTV began providing more dynamic and fast content such as YouTube channels to premiere music videos and social media accounts with the purpose of distributing content to the teen/college-aged demographic. The YouTube streaming platform is now the main source for audiences to consume music video premieres and relevant content. However, MTV remains airing all of reality content as well as award shows.

On Wednesday December 31, 2025, All of MTV's music stations ceased to broadcast in the UK. At 05:58 on the main 'MTV Music' channel the last music video played was "Video Killed the Radio Star" by 'The Buggles', the very same video that was the first video aired in 1981. It had a strapline that explained the signing off, and ended with "Thanks for being a part of it". It then faded to the MTV logo.

== Impact on the music industry ==
The impact that television's music has had on music culture is that it allowed for aesthetic and personal style to the lead in terms of importance over sound in popular music. Before the age of MTV, the term "pop" was a means to describe popular music at the given time. However, after music videos began to become more widespread the term "pop music" started to describe musical genre that was accompanied by specific aesthetics through visual art in conjunction to sound. Moreover, to get a record deal in the time after 1981, when the year where MTV had launched, the sound was not as important as image when it came to creating a novelty act nor selling records. An example of this can be seen through Madonna and Michael Jackson (ironically, he is the first black artist to play a song's video, but refused to add all of non-white artists and is mentioned by Bowie in MTV's controversy) who used the platform MTV to create careers that were based on music videos, choreography, and personal style over an audiovisual performance.

The impact of music television on the music industry after the launch of MTV led to addition of specific visual art division within record labels which had the specific intention of introducing new acts to audiences with a clear image. However, this strategy sometimes was ineffective for up-and-coming artist since most commercial broadcasters wanted to air recently established artist. Nevertheless, record companies found a way to overcome this issue by signing exclusivity deals with MTV to guarantee air play both their established artists as well their newer artists.

Additionally, a key factor in music television's success in the 1980s and 1990s was the evocative structure of music videos that were specifically targeted towards the teenaged audience. The impact that MTV specifically had was that it was a window into popular trends and fashion unlike in the 21st century where trends are available through social media.

The extent of the effect of television's music after the late 1990s is argumentative. In the golden era of music videos (1985–96), fame achieved through television was an integral part of the star-making process for the music industry. However, the depletion of television rating going into the 21st century as well as the aspect that radio was the more dominant form of broadcast media in terms of longevity dating from the 1920s to the mid-late 1950s show that the effect of television in terms of longevity were scarce.

In the late 1990s, the expense of creating a music video grew from tens of thousands to hundreds of thousands which made them less appealing as an easy market source. Starting in early 2000s, YouTube and Myspace started removing the need to pay broadcasters for air time and the music industry had found a free substitute. following the launch of Vevo in 2009 the increase of music videos consumed on Internet platform surpassed the expectation of record labels. Another aspect that lead to depletion of the effects of music television are those record companies were cutting video budgets and industry paper along moving most up-to-date content to digital platforms.
