= Lego Masters (Australian TV series) season 8 =

Lego Masters
- Season 8
- Hosted by: Hamish Blake
- Judges: Ryan "The Brickman" McNaught
- No. of teams: 4
- Location: Sydney

Release
- Original network: Nine Network
- Original release: 5 July – 26 July 2026

Season chronology
- ← Previous; Season 7

The eighth season of Australian reality television series Lego Masters, titled Lego Masters Australia Bricktacular began airing on 5 July 2026. This season is a four episode special series based around builds related to Bluey, Jurassic Park, Lord of the Rings and the DC Universe. For the first time, the competition will be between four teams of three previous LEGO Masters players from Australia and around the world. Hamish Blake returned as host along with Ryan "The Brickman" McNaught as judge and featuring Sophie Monk. The teams will be competing for the LEGO Masters grand title, and the $100,000 grand prize.

== Production ==
In October 2025, the series was renewed for an eighth season however it will be a limited series, it will see the return of past contestants both of Australia and international teams that will be make four trio teams and will air over four episodes.

== Teams ==
The season will see the first trio teams combined from former Australian and international contestants. Since some contestants have appeared in more than one season, in Bricksmas Specials or as special guests, see season details for further details.

Team	Season Appearances	Country	Status
Jackson, Alex T & Fleur	2 • 2 • 3	Australia	Winner
Gabby, Oskari & Aura	3,5,7 • 7 • 7	Australia & Finland	Runner-up
Trent, Alex G & Felix	2,5,7 • 4,5,7 • 6	Australia & Germany	Third
Jordy (Jordan), Michelle & Max	1 • 6 • 4	Australia & USA	Eliminated

== Elimination history ==
Teams' progress through the competition
Team	Challenge				Grand Finale
Team	1	2	3	Total	Grand Finale
Jackson, Alex T & Fleur	18	17	17	52	Winner
Trent, Alex G & Felix	17	19	19	55	Third
Gabby, Oskari & Aura	17	17	20	54	Runner-up
Jordy, Michelle & Max	16	16	18	50	Eliminated

Table key
First	Team came first place in the challenge or the show
Second	Team came second place in the challenge or the show
Third	Team came third place in the challenge or the show
Fourth	Team came fourth place in the challenge or the show
Eliminated	Team was eliminated from the competition

== Series Details ==
=== Challenge 1 ===
- Airdate - 5 July 2026
- Challenge: "The Lord of the Rings" Teams tackle landmark scenes from the film trilogy using forced perspective, with 10 hours to bring Middle-earth to life celebrating the 25th anniversary of the Lord of the Rings film trilogy. Teams were assigned their scenes by blind selection; host Hamish Blake instructed teams to choose a workstation bench, each of which had an envelope hidden underneath containing a specific iconic scene.
- Advantage: For the first time, there is no brick to confer an advantage. Rather at the end of each build, the builds are scored on a leader board with the team with the lowest total score eliminated at the end of Challenge 3.

Team	Lego Design	Build Score (20)	Leader Board Position
Jackson, Alex T & Fleur	The Battle of Isengard	18	First
Trent, Alex G & Felix	The Battle of Helm's Deep	17	Equal Second
Gabby, Oskari & Aura	Balin's Tomb	17	Equal Second
Jordy, Michelle & Max	The Balrog Encounter	16	Third

=== Challenge 2 ===
- Airdate - 12 July 2026
- Challenge: "DC Heroes" Teams build moving window displays over 8 hours featuring assigned DC characters including Batman, Supergirl, Green Lantern and Lobo. 100 members of the public voted for their favourite build which then granted a bonus point to the score. Builds were assigned by the winning team from the previous Challenge.
- Advantage: The leader board cumulative score determined which team will be eliminated after Challenge 3.

Team	Lego Design	Build Score	Result	Cumulative Score	Leader Board Position
Trent, Alex G & Felix	Batman vs Catwoman	18 + 1	First	36	First
Jackson, Alex T & Fleur	Lobo vs Superman	17	Equal Second	35	Second
Gabby, Oskari & Aura	Supergirl vs Brainiac	17	Equal Second	34	Third
Jordy, Michelle & Max	Green Lantern vs Sinestro	16	Fourth	32	Fourth

=== Challenge 3 ===
- Airdate - 19 July 2026
- Challenge: "Bluey" Teams design a brand new Australian “Big Thing” landmark over 10 hours for Bluey’s family road trip, built in the aesthetic style of the beloved animated series. One team will be eliminated. Builds were assigned by the winning team from the previous Challenge based on a setting and the team determines the big thing. Bonus point is assigned for the best built Bluey character. Alex G is awarded a special brick for building for over 500 hours in the Brick Masters Australia franchise.
- Advantage: After this Challenge, the team lowest on the leader board is eliminated.

Team	Setting and Lego Design	Build Score	Result	Cumulative Score	Leader Board Position
Trent, Alex G & Felix	The Beach and The Big Seagull	19	Second	55	First
Gabby, Oskari & Aura	The Creek and The Big Yabby	19 + 1	First	54	Second
Jackson, Alex T & Fleur	The Outback and The Big Dunny	17	Fourth	52	Third
Jordy, Michelle & Max	The City and The Big Xylophone	18	Third	50	Eliminated

=== Grand Finale ===
- Airdate - 26 July 2026
- Challenge: "Jurassic World" Three teams tackle a giant LEGO island shaped like the Jurassic Park logo, each bringing a different era of the franchise to life (land (jungle), air (mountains) and water (sea)), to celebrate 30 years of the Jurassic World franchise. The teams have 12 hours to build the and action scene depicting the dinosaurs. The season leaders get to choose the builds. Two hundred members of the public will vote on the final builds with Brickmaster having 100 votes. The winner takes home $100,000.

Team	Lego Design	Result
Jackson, Alex T & Fleur	Air: Monorail Mayhem	Winner
Gabby, Oskari & Aura	Sea: Deep Sea Striker	Runner-up
Trent, Alex G & Felix	Land: Towering T-Rex	Third

== Ratings ==
Viewership data focuses on National Reach and National Total ratings instead of the five metro centres and overnight shares.

No.	Title	Air date	Timeslot	National reach viewers	National total viewers	Night rank	Ref(s)
1	Challenge 1	5 July 2026	Sunday 7:00 pm	2,014,000	736,000	3	
2	Challenge 2	12 July 2026	Sunday 7:00 pm	1,746,000	615,000	10	
3	Challenge 3	19 July 2026	Sunday 7:00 pm	1,796,000	698,000	6	
4	Grand Finale	26 July 2026	Sunday 7:00 pm	1,772,000	733,000	5	
