= Lego Masters Bricksmas Specials =

- Genre: Reality
- Presented by: Hamish Blake
- Judges: Ryan "The Brickman" McNaught
- Country of origin: Australia
- Original language: English
- No. of episodes: 4

Production
- Running time: 90 mins (including ads)
- Production company: Endemol Shine Australia

Original release
- Network: Nine Network
- Release: 21 November 2021 – 27 November 2022

The Lego Masters Bricksmas Specials are the Christmas specials of the Australian reality television series Lego Masters. Hamish Blake and Ryan "The Brickman" McNaught returned as hosts for the specials. The first special, broadcast in two parts, aired on 21 and 28 November 2021. The second Christmas special, also a two-parter, aired on 20 and 27 November 2022.

The specials feature celebrities pairing up with past Lego Masters contestants to compete. Rather than a monetary prize, the winners receive a Christmas themed Lego trophy and $20,000 will be donated to Kmart’s Wishing Tree.

== Production ==
Celebrity contestants on the first special included Scott Cam, Brooke Boney, Sophie Monk and Michael (Wippa) Wipfli paired with returning Lego Masters contestants Michael from Season 3, Jay and Stani from Season 2 and Henry, one half of the Season 1 winning team.

During Nine’s 2023 upfronts, it was announced that a second Christmas special will air in the fourth quarter of 2022, with celebrities Poh Ling Yeow, Emma Watkins, Darren Palmer and Lincoln Lewis paired with returning Lego Masters contestants Gerhard “G” from Season 1, Alex from Season 2 and Fleur & Sarah from Season 3.

== 2021 Brickmas Special ==
=== Teams ===
Team	Relationship	Status
Brooke Boney & Michael	TV personality from Today & Lego Masters (Australia) 5th place contestant from Season 3	Winners
Scott Cam & Jay	TV personality from The Block & Lego Masters (Australia) 6th place contestant from Season 2	Runners up
Wippa & Stani	Radio personality on Nova 96.9 & Lego Masters (Australia) 6th place contestant from Season 2	Bottom two
Sophie Monk & Henry	TV personality from The Bachelorette and Beauty & The Geek & Lego Masters (Australia) winner from Season 1	Bottom two

=== Challenges ===
==== Challenge 1 ====
- Airdate - 21 November 2021
- Challenge: - Each of the four teams were tasked with creating a design for a Christmas shopfront window based on a minifig pick in 15 hours. Brickman gave each team 1 hour of help of their choice.
- Advantage - The winner of the challenge received an advantage, an hour of Hamish's time, for the Grand Finale.

Team	Lego Design	Brickman's Help	Result
Brooke & Michael	White Christmas	Sleigh	Challenge Winners
Scott & Jay	Santa's Workshop	Santa	Runners-up
Wippa & Stani	Night Before Christmas	Chesterfield Chair	Bottom two
Sophie & Henry	Aussie (Gangster) Christmas	Koala & Kangaroo	Bottom two

==== Grand Finale ====
- Airdate - 28 November 2021
- Challenge: - The four teams were tasked with creating a dream Lego set at minifig scale. Hamish built a grasshopper for Brooke and Michael as part of winning the challenge and receiving an advantage (the grasshopper was actually built by Brickman). Brickman again gave an hour of his time to each team.

Team	Lego Design	Brickman's Help	Result
Brooke & Michael	Toad School (Fairy School in a toadstool)	Waterwheel	Challenge Winners
Scott & Jay	Aussie Bush Christmas (Australian Federation settler home)	Windmill	Runners-up
Wippa & Stani	Castle Battle	Tower walls	Bottom two
Sophie & Henry	Entertainment Chest (each drawer had a scene from a TV show^{NB})	Drawer faces	Bottom two

^{NB} Love Island, Lego Masters, Today and the Logie Awards.

=== Viewership ===
No.	Title	Air date	Timeslot	Overnight ratings		Consolidated ratings		Total viewers	Ref(s)
No.	Title	Air date	Timeslot	Viewers	Rank	Viewers	Rank	Total viewers	Ref(s)
1	Challenge 1	21 November 2021	Sunday 7:00pm	804,000	3	63,000	2	867,000	
2	Challenge 2	28 November 2021	Sunday 7:00pm	761,000	3	56,000	2	817,000	

== 2022 Brickmas Special ==
=== Teams ===
Team	Relationship	Status
Poh Ling Yeow & Sarah	TV chef & Lego Masters (Australia) 4th place contestant from Season 3	Winners
Emma Watkins & G (Gerhard)	Children's entertainer & Lego Masters (Australia) runner up contestant from Season 1	
Darren Palmer & Fleur	The Block judge and interior designer & Lego Masters (Australia) 4th place contestant from Season 3	
Lincoln Lewis & Alex	Actor & Lego Masters (Australia) winning contestant from Season 2	

=== Challenges ===
==== Challenge 1 ====
- Airdate - 20 November 2022
- Challenge: - Each of the four teams were tasked with building the inside surprise of a premade Lego Christmas cracker over 12 hours. Brickman gave each team 1 hour of help of their choice.
- Advantage - The winner received an advantage for the Grand Final challenge.

Team	Lego Design	Brickman's Help	Result
Darren & Fleur	Turkey in the oven wearing a Christmas jumper	Turkey's wings and one tail feather	Challenge Winners
Poh & Sarah	Dunny Santa	Outhouse and toilet	Runners-up
Emma & G	A castle concert with animals	Barn with animals	Bottom two
Lincoln & Alex	Dragon hoarding gifts	Trinkets and hinged treasure chest lid	Bottom two

==== Grand Finale ====
- Airdate - 27 November 2022
- Challenge: - Each of the four teams were tasked with building one of the items featured in the '9 Days of Bricksmas' carol over 12 hours. As the team with the advantage, Darren and Fleur had first choice of their selection. Brickman also gave each team 1 hour of his time for their builds.

Team	Lego Design	Brickman's Help	Result
Poh & Sarah	Hula hooping Hippos (Pair of hippos spinning hoops on top of presents)	Rotating mechanism	Challenge Winners
Darren & Fleur	Freight Train of Fortune (Flying gingerbread train with rich elves inside)	Clouds	
Emma & G	Shipwrecking Pirates (Pirates meeting and playing with beachgoers)	Sky backdrop	
Lincoln & Alex	Atomic Ants attacking (Giant ants morphed by atomic radiation attacking a building)	Garbage truck	

=== Viewership ===
No.	Title	Air date	Timeslot	Overnight ratings		Consolidated ratings		Total viewers	Ref(s)
No.	Title	Air date	Timeslot	Viewers	Rank	Viewers	Rank	Total viewers	Ref(s)
1	Challenge 1	20 November 2022	Sunday 7:00pm	561,000	4	80,000	4	641,000	
2	Challenge 2	27 November 2022	Sunday 7:00pm	569,000	4	49,000	3	618,000	
