= List of Australian television ratings for 2020 =

The following is a list of Australian television ratings for the year 2020.

== Network shares ==
Market	Network shares
Market	ABC	Seven	Nine	Ten	SBS
5 cities	18.4%	26.9%	27.8%	18.0%	8.9%
Sydney
Melbourne
Brisbane
Adelaide
Perth

== Most Watched Broadcasts in 2020 ==
Rank	Broadcast	Genre	Origin	Date	Network	Audience
1	2020 AFL Grand Final	Sport	(Australia)	24 October 2020	7	3,016,000
2	2020 AFL Grand Final: Presentations	Sport	(Australia)	24 October 2020	7	2,294,000
3	2020 AFL Grand Final – On The Ground	Sport	(Australia)	24 October 2020	7	2,192,000
4	2020 NRL Grand Final	Sport	(Australia)	25 October 2020	9	2,106,000
5	2020 State of Origin (Rugby League) — Match 3	Sport	(Australia)	18 November 2020	9	1,894,000
6	2020 Australian Open Day 8 — Night	Sport	(Australia)	27 January 2020	9	1,874,000
7	The Block 2020 – Winner Announced	Reality	(Australia)	22 November 2020	9	1,838,000
8	Lego Masters Australia – Winner Announced	Reality	(Australia)	18 May 2020	9	1,692,000
9	2020 State of Origin (Rugby League) — Match 2	Sport	(Australia)	11 November 2020	9	1,658,000
10	2020 New Year's Eve — Midnight Fireworks	Television special	(Australia)	31 December 2020	ABC	1,614,000
11	2020 State of Origin (Rugby League) — Match 1	Sport	(Australia)	4 November 2020	9	1,606,000
12	MasterChef Australia – Winner Announced	Reality	(Australia)	20 July 2020	10	1,592,000
13	Married at First Sight – Finale	Reality	(Australia)	5 April 2020	9	1,562,000
14	2020 Australian Open – Men's Final	Sport	(Australia)	2 February 2020	9	1,531,000
15	2020 AFL Grand Final — Pre-Match Entertainment	Sport	(Australia)	24 October 2020	7	1,487,000
16	Lego Masters Australia – Launch	Reality	(Australia)	19 April 2020	9	1,479,000
17	The Block 2020 – Grand Final	Reality	(Australia)	22 November 2020	9	1,470,000
18	Married at First Sight – Final Dinner Party	Reality	(Australia)	31 March 2020	9	1,447,000
19	Lego Masters Australia – Finale	Reality	(Australia)	18 May 2020	9	1,432,000
20	2020 Melbourne Cup Carnival – Race	Sport	(Australia)	3 November 2020	10	1,412,000

== Weekly ratings ==
- From the week beginning, 9 February 2020.

Week	Network shares					Top programs
Week	ABC	Seven	Nine	Ten	SBS	Top programs
7	17.7%	26.6%	30.0%	17.7%	8.0%	Nine Network – Married at First Sight (1,330,000); Nine Network – Married at First Sight (1,242,000); Nine Network – Married at First Sight (1,241,000); Nine Network – Married at First Sight (1,194,000); Seven Network – Seven News (1,031,000)
8	17.5%	28.0%	29.9%	17.0%	7.6%	Nine Network – Married at First Sight (1,227,000); Nine Network – Married at First Sight (1,223,000); Nine Network – Married at First Sight (1,205,000); Nine Network – Married at First Sight (1,117,000); Seven Network – Fire Fight Australia Concert (1,031,000)
9	18.5%	26.2%	29.2%	17.6%	8.5%	Nine Network – Married at First Sight (1,304,000); Nine Network – Married at First Sight (1,303,000); Nine Network – Married at First Sight (1,155,000); Nine Network – Married at First Sight (1,143,000); Nine Network – Nine News (936,000)
10	18.2%	25.6%	30.1%	17.9%	8.3%	Nine Network – Married at First Sight (1,290,000); Nine Network – Married at First Sight (1,236,000); Nine Network – Married at First Sight (1,200,000); Nine Network – Married at First Sight (1,099,000); Seven Network – Seven News (916,000)
11	18.2%	25.1%	31.4%	17.6%	7.8%	Nine Network – Married at First Sight (1,177,000); Nine Network – Married at First Sight (1,132,000); Nine Network – Married at First Sight (1,086,000); Nine Network – Married at First Sight (1,062,000); Seven Network – Seven News (930,000)
12	19.2%	26.2%	29.2%	17.1%	7.8%	Nine Network – Married at First Sight (1,208,000); Nine Network – Married at First Sight (1,181,000); Nine Network – Married at First Sight (1,162,000); Nine Network – Married at First Sight (1,140,000); Nine Network – Nine News (1,095,000)
13	20.7%	25.2%	30.2%	16.3%	7.6%	Seven Network – Seven News (1,381,000); Nine Network – Married at First Sight (1,313,000); Nine Network – Nine News (1,271,000); Nine Network – Seven News (1,247,000); Nine Network – Married at First Sight (1,227,000)
14	20.3%	24.4%	30.5%	17.0%	7.8%	Nine Network – Married at First Sight Final Dinner Party (1,432,000); Nine Network – Nine News (1,379,000); Seven Network – Seven News (1,305,000); Seven Network – Seven News (1,271,000); Nine Network – Married at First Sight (1,224,000)
15	19.9%	26.0%	28.7%	15.9%	9.5%	Nine Network – Married at First Sight Final (1,554,000); Nine Network – Nine News (1,321,000); Seven Network – Seven News (1,305,000); Seven Network – Seven News (1,266,000); Seven Network – Seven News (1,181,000)
16	18.9%	24.9%	26.0%	21.2%	9.1%	Network Ten – MasterChef Australia launch (1,289,000); Seven Network – Seven News (1,288,000); Seven Network – Seven News (1,245,000); Seven Network – Seven News (1,237,000); Network Ten – MasterChef Australia (1,171,000)
17	18.4%	25.2%	29.0%	19.4%	8.0%	Nine Network – Lego Masters launch (1,391,000); Seven Network – Seven News (1,254,000); Seven Network – Seven News (1,252,000); Nine Network – Lego Masters (1,212,000); Seven Network – Seven News (1,190,000)
18	18.1%	26.2%	26.8%	20.4%	8.5%	Nine Network – Lego Masters (1,311,000); Seven Network – Seven News (1,271,000); Seven Network – Seven News (1,260,000); Nine Network – Lego Masters (1,248,000); Seven Network – Seven News (1,180,000)
19	17.7%	27.0%	26.5%	20.2%	8.6%	Nine Network – Lego Masters (1,320,000); Nine Network – Lego Masters (1,263,000); Seven Network – Seven News (1,255,000); Seven Network – Seven News (1,225,000); Seven Network – Seven News (1,159,000)
20	17.6%	26.6%	27.1%	20.3%	8.5%	Nine Network – Lego Masters (1,387,000); Nine Network – Lego Masters (1,312,000); Seven Network – Seven News (1,232,000); Seven Network – Seven News (1,220,000); Seven Network – Seven News (1,046,000)
21	17.7%	25.8%	27.6%	20.6%	8.3%	Nine Network – Lego Masters Winner Announced (1,630,000); Nine Network – Lego Masters final (1,386,000); Nine Network – Lego Masters (1,354,000); Nine Network – Lego Masters (1,236,000); Seven Network – Seven News (1,182,000)
22	16.8%	25.7%	28.8%	20.3%	8.4%	Seven Network – Seven News (1,182,000); Seven Network – Seven News (1,172,000); Nine Network – Nine News (1,132,000); Seven Network – Seven News (1,102,000); Network Ten – MasterChef Australia (1,101,000)
23	17.3%	25.8%	28.6%	20.5%	7.8%	Nine Network – Nine News (1,191,000); Seven Network – Seven News (1,172,000); Seven Network – Seven News (1,162,000); Nine Network – The Voice (1,098,000); Seven Network – Seven News (1,086,000)
24	15.7%	31.1%	26.0%	19.0%	8.3%	Seven Network – Seven News (1,137,000); Seven Network – Seven News (1,078,000); Network Ten – MasterChef Australia (1,062,000); Seven Network – Seven News (1,037,000); Network Ten – Seven News (1,033,000)
25	16.8%	29.5%	26.6%	18.6%	8.6%	Seven Network – Seven News (1,149,000); Seven Network – Seven News (1,095,000); Nine Network – Nine News (1,058,000); Seven Network – Seven News (1,033,000); Nine Network – The Voice (1,011,000)
26	17.1%	30.5%	25.9%	18.3%	8.1%	Seven Network – Seven News (1,188,000); Seven Network – Seven News (1,126,000); Seven Network – Seven News (1,076,000); Network Ten – MasterChef Australia (1,054,000); Network Ten – MasterChef Australia (1,026,000)
27	16.8%	28.8%	26.5%	19.0%	8.9%	Seven Network – Seven News (1,189,000); Seven Network – Seven News (1,128,000); Nine Network – Nine News (1,090,000); Seven Network – Seven News (1,073,000); Network Ten – MasterChef Australia (1,023,000)
28	16.5%	28.8%	27.2%	18.2%	9.4%	Seven Network – Seven News (1,204,000); Seven Network – Seven News (1,180,000); Seven Network – Seven News (1,114,000); Nine Network – Nine News (1,065,000); Nine Network – Nine News (1,048,000)
29	15.9%	29.5%	27.4%	18.5%	8.7%	Seven Network – Seven News (1,239,000); Seven Network – Seven News (1,175,000); Nine Network – Nine News (1,137,000); Seven Network – Seven News Presents: Murder in the Outback (1,128,000); Seven Network – Seven News (1,125,000)
30	16.4%	30.4%	26.3%	19.1%	7.8%	Network Ten – MasterChef Australia Winner Announced (1,576,000); Seven Network – Seven News (1,349,000); Network Ten – MasterChef Australia finale (1,300,000); Network Ten – MasterChef Australia (1,195,000); Nine Network – Nine News (1,171,000)
31	16.6%	30.0%	28.4%	16.3%	8.7%	Seven Network – Seven News (1,312,000); Seven Network – Seven News (1,137,000); Nine Network – Nine News (1,130,000); Nine Network – Australian Ninja Warrior launch (1,096,000); Nine Network – Nine News (1,080,000)
32	17.6%	28.5%	28.7%	16.0%	9.2%	Seven Network – Seven News (1,232,000); Seven Network – Seven News (1,165,000); Seven Network – Seven News (1,112,000); Nine Network – Nine News (1,104,000); Nine Network – Nine News (1,089,000)
33	17.3%	28.7%	27.8%	17.7%	8.5%	Seven Network – Seven News (1,277,000); Nine Network – Australian Ninja Warrior Winner Announced (1,272,000); Nine Network – Australian Ninja Warrior (1,145,000); Nine Network – Australian Ninja Warrior final (1,144,000); Nine Network – Nine News (1,137,000)
34	18.0%	28.9%	27.1%	16.9%	9.1%	Seven Network – Seven News (1,157,000); Seven Network – Seven News (1,089,000); Nine Network – Nine News (1,062,000); Seven Network – Seven News (1,051,000); Network Ten – The Masked Singer (1,008,000)
35	17.1%	28.8%	27.7%	17.0%	9.4%	Seven Network – Seven News (1,192,000); Seven Network – Seven News (1,087,000); Nine Network – Nine News (1,074,000); Nine Network – The Block launch (1,099,000); Seven Network – Seven News (1,035,000)
36	17.9%	27.9%	26.9%	17.4%	9.9%	Seven Network – Seven News (1,168,000); Nine Network – The Block (1,098,000); Seven Network – Seven News (1,055,000); Nine Network – Nine News (1,013,000); Network Ten – The Masked Singer (1,011,000)
37	17.3%	28.0%	27.8%	17.2%	9.8%	Nine Network – Nine News (1,047,000); Seven Network – Seven News (1,047,000); Seven Network – Seven News (1,039,000); Nine Network – The Block (1,038,000); Nine Network – Nine News (994,000)
38	18.1%	27.4%	27.6%	17.1%	9.7%	Network Ten – The Masked Singer final reveal (1,237,000); Seven Network – Seven News (1,133,000); Network Ten – The Masked Singer finale (1,047,000); Nine Network – The Block (1,033,000); Nine Network – The Block (1,021,000)
39	18.4%	27.9%	28.8%	16.8%	8.1%	Seven Network – Seven News (1,105,000); Nine Network – The Block (1,061,000); Seven Network – Seven News (1,044,000); Nine Network – The Block (1,018,000); Nine Network – Nine News (1,012,000)
40	17.6%	31.1%	27.9%	15.9%	7.6%	Nine Network – Nine News (1,137,000); Seven Network – Seven News (1,088,000); Nine Network – The Block (1,041,000); Seven Network – Seven News (998,000); Nine Network – The Block (972,000)
41	17.3%	28.3%	29.4%	16.9%	8.1%	Nine Network – The Block (1,099,000); Nine Network – The Block (1,024,000); Nine Network – The Block (1,003,000); Seven Network – Seven News (992,000); Seven Network – Seven News (981,000)
42	17.5%	30.0%	27.5%	17.5%	7.5%	Nine Network – The Block (1,187,000); ABC – Gruen (1,037,000); Nine Network – The Block (1,036,000); Seven Network – Seven's AFL: finals series (964,000); Seven Network – Seven News (959,000)
43	16.5%	35.1%	25.3%	16.1%	7.0%	Seven Network – 2020 AFL Grand Final (3,016,000); Seven Network – 2020 AFL Grand Final: Presentations (2,290,000); Seven Network – 2020 AFL Grand Final — On The Ground (2,191,000); Seven Network – 2020 AFL Grand Final — Pre-Match Entertainment (1,487,000); Nine Network – The Block (1,136,000)
44	18.9%	25.1%	31.2%	16.9%	9.9%	Nine Network – 2020 NRL Grand Final (2,106,000); Nine Network – 2020 NRL Grand Final — Entertainment (1,146,000); Nine Network – Nine News (1,108,000); Seven Network – Seven News (1,079,000); Nine Network – The Block (1,032,000)
45	19.9%	24.3%	30.6%	17.5%	7.7%	Nine Network – 2020 State of Origin — Match 1 (1,606,000); Network Ten – 2020 Melbourne Cup Carnival — Race (1,412,000); Nine Network – The Block (1,232,000); Nine Network – The Block (1,056,000); Seven Network – Seven News (979,000)
46	19.2%	25.3%	31.3%	16.9%	7.3%	Nine Network – 2020 State of Origin — Match 2 (1,658,000); Nine Network – The Block (1,158,000); Nine Network – The Block (1,067,000); Seven Network – Seven News (967,000); Seven Network – Seven News (954,000)
47	18.3%	26.2%	30.5%	16.5%	8.5%	Nine Network – 2020 State of Origin series#Game III — Match 3 (1,894,000); Nine Network – The Block (1,136,000); Nine Network – The Block (1,045,000); Nine Network – Nine News (950,000); Seven Network – Seven News (949,000)
48	18.3%	27.8%	28.3%	17.0%	8.6%	Nine Network – The Block (1,826,000); Nine Network – The Block (1,461,000); Nine Network – Nine News (980,000); Seven Network – Seven News (926,000); Seven Network – Seven News (898,000)

== Weekly key demographics ==
- From the week beginning, 9 February 2020.

Week	16-39	18-49	25-54
7	TBC	TBC	TBC
8	TBC	TBC	TBC
9	TBC	TBC	TBC
10	TBC	TBC	TBC

== Key demographics shares ==
Network	16-39	18-49	25-54
ABC	TBC	TBC	TBC
Seven	TBC	TBC	TBC
Nine	TBC	TBC	TBC
Ten	TBC	TBC	TBC
SBS	TBC	TBC	TBC

== See also ==
- Television ratings in Australia
