= List of Australian television ratings for 2019 =

The following is a list of Australian television ratings for the year 2019.

== Network shares ==
Market	Network shares
Market	ABC	Seven	Nine	Ten	SBS
5 cities	16.9%	28.8%	29.1%	17.1%	8.1%
Sydney
Melbourne
Brisbane
Adelaide
Perth

== Most Watched Broadcasts in 2019 ==
Rank	Broadcast	Genre	Origin	Date	Network	Audience
1	2019 AFL Grand Final	Sport	(Australia)	28 September 2019	7	2,219,000
2	2019 State of Origin (Rugby League) — Match 1	Sport	(Australia)	5 June 2019	9	2,192,000
3	Married at First Sight – Finale	Reality	(Australia)	8 April 2019	9	2,110,000
4	2019 State of Origin (Rugby League) — Match 3	Sport	(Australia)	10 July 2019	9	2,020,000
5	The Block 2019 – Winner Announced	Reality	(Australia)	10 November 2019	9	2,006,000
6	2019 AFL Grand Final: Presentations	Sport	(Australia)	28 September 2019	7	2,005,000
7	2019 State of Origin (Rugby League) — Match 2	Sport	(Australia)	23 June 2019	9	1,989,000
8	Married at First Sight – Final Dinner Party	Reality	(Australia)	7 April 2019	9	1,974,000
9	2019 NRL Grand Final	Sport	(Australia)	6 October 2019	9	1,868,000
10	Lego Masters Australia – Winner Announced	Reality	(Australia)	14 May 2019	9	1,852,000
11	Married at First Sight – Sunday	Reality	(Australia)	24 February 2019	9	1,813,000
12	Married at First Sight – Sunday	Reality	(Australia)	24 March 2019	9	1,790,000
13	Lego Masters Australia – Launch	Reality	(Australia)	28 April 2019	9	1,624,000
14	2019 AFL Grand Final – On The Ground	Sport	(Australia)	28 September 2019	7	1,621,000
15	Married at First Sight – Sunday	Reality	(Australia)	17 March 2019	9	1,614,000
16	Married at First Sight – Wednesday	Reality	(Australia)	20 March 2019	9	1,595,000
17	The Block 2019 – Grand Final	Reality	(Australia)	10 November 2019	9	1,592,000
18	2019 Australian Open – Men's Final	Sport	(Australia)	27 January 2019	9	1,592,000
19	Married at First Sight – Sunday	Reality	(Australia)	31 March 2019	9	1,570,000
20	Married at First Sight – Sunday	Reality	(Australia)	3 March 2019	9	1,559,000

== Weekly ratings ==
- From the week beginning, 10 February 2019.

Week	Network shares					Top programs
Week	ABC	Seven	Nine	Ten	SBS	Top programs
7	14.1%	24.5%	24.7%	12.7%	5.1%	Nine Network – Married at First Sight (1,432,000); Nine Network – Married at First Sight (1,415,000); Nine Network – Married at First Sight (1,370,000); Nine Network – Married at First Sight (1,292,000); Seven Network – My Kitchen Rules (1,115,000)
8	14.4%	24.1%	25.1%	12.6%	6.0%	Nine Network – Married at First Sight (1,463,000); Nine Network – Married at First Sight (1,447,000); Nine Network – Married at First Sight (1,395,000); Nine Network – Married at First Sight (1,299,000); Seven Network – My Kitchen Rules (976,000)
9	14.3%	23.5%	26.0%	12.4%	5.7%	Nine Network – Married at First Sight (1,796,000); Nine Network – Married at First Sight (1,421,000); Nine Network – Married at First Sight (1,400,000); Nine Network – Married at First Sight (1,380,000); Nine Network – 60 Minutes (1,142,000)
10	14.3%	23.0%	24.9%	13.1%	5.9%	Nine Network – Married at First Sight (1,543,000); Nine Network – Married at First Sight (1,419,000); Nine Network – Married at First Sight (1,390,000); Nine Network – Married at First Sight (1,386,000); Seven Network – Seven News (937,000)

== Weekly key demographics ==
- From the week beginning, 10 February 2015.

Week	16-39	18-49	25-54
7	TBC	TBC	TBC
8	TBC	TBC	TBC
9	TBC	TBC	TBC
10	TBC	TBC	TBC

== Key demographics shares ==
Network	16-39	18-49	25-54
ABC	TBC	TBC	TBC
Seven	TBC	TBC	TBC
Nine	TBC	TBC	TBC
Ten	TBC	TBC	TBC
SBS	TBC	TBC	TBC

== See also ==
- Television ratings in Australia
