= Lego Masters (Australian TV series) season 3 =

Lego Masters
- Season 3
- Hosted by: Hamish Blake
- Judges: Ryan "The Brickman" McNaught
- No. of teams: 8
- Winners: David & Gus
- Runners-up: Owen & Scott
- Location: Melbourne, Australia
- No. of episodes: 14

Release
- Original network: Nine Network
- Original release: 19 April – 17 May 2021

Season chronology
- ← Previous; Season 2 Next → Season 4

The third season of Australian reality television series Lego Masters premiered on the Nine Network on 19 April 2021. Hamish Blake returned as host along with Ryan "The Brickman" McNaught as judge.

== Production ==
Auditions for the third season opened in May 2020 asking for applicants 15 years old and above. In early September 2020, it was confirmed the third season would begin filming on Monday, October 5 at Melbourne Showgrounds. On 16 September 2020, the third season was officially confirmed at Nine's 2021 upfronts.

== Teams ==
Team	Ages	Relationship/ Occupation^{1}	Status
David & Gus	41 & 36	Project manager & engineer	Winners
Owen & Scott	26 & 26	Best Friends	Runners-Up
Ryan & Gabby	42 & 39	Primary School teacher & occupational therapist	Eliminated (Challenge 7); Returned (Challenge 8); Eliminated (Challenge 14)
Sarah & Fleur	45 & 43	Mums	Eliminated (Challenge 13)
Harrison & Michael	26 & 25	PhD candidate & physiotherapist	Eliminated (Challenge 12)
Anthony & Jess	20 & 30	Hotel concierge & science communicator	Eliminated (Challenge 6); Returned (Challenge 8); Eliminated (Challenge 10)
Amy & Dawei	33 & 33	Content creator & auditor/wedding photographer	Eliminated (Challenge 4 & 8)
Atlanta & Jeff	25 & 28	Luxury dice consultant & enthusiastic geek	Eliminated (Challenge 3 & 8)

Notes

*^1 Not all teams in the season have a relation (i.e. family or friend), some were paired together during the application process due to single applications.

== Elimination history ==
Teams' progress through the competition
Team	Challenge													
Team	1	2	3	4	5	6	7	8	9	10	11	12	13	GF
David & Gus	Safe	Safe	Top One	Top One	Safe	Top One	Top One	—N/a	Safe	Top Two	Top Two	Safe	Top One	Winners
Owen & Scott	Top Two	Top One	Immunity	Safe	Top Two	Safe	Safe	—N/a	Top One	Immunity	Top One	Immunity	Top Two	Runners up
Ryan & Gabby	BOD	Safe	Safe	Safe	Safe	Top Two	Eliminated	Top One	Top Two	Top One	Safe	Top One	Safe	Eliminated
Sarah & Fleur	Top One	Safe	Safe	Top Two	Safe	Safe	Immunity	—N/a	Safe	Safe	Safe	Top Two	Eliminated	
Harrison & Michael	Safe	Safe	Top Two	Safe	Top One	Immunity	Safe	—N/a	Safe	Safe	Safe	Eliminated		
Anthony & Jess	Safe	Top Two	Safe	Safe	Safe	Eliminated		Top One	Safe	Eliminated				
Amy & Dawei	Safe	Safe	Safe	Eliminated				Lost	Eliminated					
Atlanta & Jeff	Safe	Safe	Eliminated					Lost	Eliminated					

Table key
Advantage	Team received an advantage from Brickman
Top One	Team came 1st place in the challenge or the show
Immunity	Team is immune and safe from elimination
Safe	Team was safe from elimination after passing a challenge/round.
Eliminated	Team was eliminated from the competition
BOD	Team was safe but received the Brick of Doom
Immunity	Team used “The Platinum Brick” to avoid elimination
—N/a	Results do not apply as the team was not allocated to this challenge

== Series Details ==
=== Challenge 1 ===
- Airdate - 19 April 2021
- Challenge: "Stop In Your Tracks" - Each of the eight teams were tasked with creating a design of their choice in 17 hours that would cause a train to stop.
- Advantage - The winner of the challenge received "The Platinum Brick", which they can use at the end of an Elimination Challenge to receive immunity.
- The Brick of Doom - A brand new invention this season. Drawing the Brick of Doom means your team will be cursed and punished with a 5-minute delay in starting the builds. The curse can be broken by winning a challenge.

Team	Lego Design	Result
Sarah & Fleur	Geisha Temple	Advantage - Top One
Owen & Scott	Government vs Mothership	Safe - Top two
Anthony & Jess	Volcano Mid-Eruption	Safe
Atlanta & Jeff	Cheese God	Safe
David & Gus	Giant Chomping Crocodile	Safe
Amy & Dawei	Magic Mountain	Safe
Harrison & Michael	Classic Theme Park	Safe
Ryan & Gabby	Giant Yeti	BOD

=== Challenge 2 ===
- Airdate - 20 April 2021
- Challenge: "Castles and Cannonballs" - The teams had 8 hours to build a castle from a historical time period selected at random. Once finished, they were placed at the end of a bowling lane and smashed by a ball bowled by Hamish. The winner of the challenge received immunity from the next Elimination Challenge - no elimination in this challenge.

Team	Lego Design	Result
Owen & Scott	Wizard's Castle	Challenge Winners - Top One
Anthony & Jess	Samurai Dojo	Safe - Top two
Sarah & Fleur	Spartan Warrior	Safe
Atlanta & Jeff	Dark Knight's Secret	Safe
David & Gus	Quiet Viking Village	Safe
Amy & Dawei	Hungry Dragon	Safe
Harrison & Michael	Hydra Attack	Safe
Ryan & Gabby	Viking's Fortress	Safe

=== Challenge 3 ===
- Airdate - 21 April 2021
- Challenge: "Snow Globe" - Each team had 10 hours to create a design of their choice that would look beautiful inside a snow globe which had to factor in how the snow would move around the globe and add to their story. The team with the weakest design was eliminated.

Team	Lego Design	Result
Owen & Scott	N/A	Immunity
David & Gus	Fox In First Snow	Challenge Winners - Top One
Harrison & Michael	Aussie Christmas	Safe - Top two
Sarah & Fleur	Ice Ballerina	Safe
Anthony & Jess	The Night Before Christmas	Safe
Amy & Dawei	Stuck In The Ice	Safe
Ryan & Gabby	Ned Kelly	Safe - Bottom two
Atlanta & Jeff	Stonehenge	Eliminated

=== Challenge 4 ===
- Airdate - 25 April 2021
- Advantage Challenge: "Fantastical Beasts" - Teams were given six hours to build a creature with characteristics of two animals decided by what animals they landed on two separate chocolate wheels. The winner of the challenge received an advantage of an extra 30 minutes for the elimination challenge.
- Elimination Challenge: "Mission to Mars" - The teams were given eight hours to make a creation on a shelf for a spaceship, choosing what mankind would send to Mars. The team with the weakest design was eliminated.

Team	Lego Design	Result
Advantage Challenge - “Fantastical Beasts”
David & Gus	Walrus Flamingo	Advantage - Top One
Owen & Scott	Shark Peacock	Through to Elimination Challenge
Sarah & Fleur	Shark Frilled Neck Lizard	Through to Elimination Challenge
Anthony & Jess	Pig Flamingo	Through to Elimination Challenge
Amy & Dawei	Elephant Scorpion	Through to Elimination Challenge
Harrison & Michael	Spider Bat	Through to Elimination Challenge
Ryan & Gabby	Shark Flamingo	Through to Elimination Challenge
Elimination Challenge - “Mission to Mars”
David & Gus	Fun Arcade	Challenge Winners - Top One
Sarah & Fleur	Mars The Musical	Safe - Top two
Anthony & Jess	Chocolate Factory Explosion	Safe
Harrison & Michael	Dogs’ Escape	Safe
Ryan & Gabby	Art Gallery Heist	Safe
Owen & Scott	Space Armoury	Safe - Bottom two
Amy & Dawei	Alien Jail Break	Eliminated

=== Challenge 5 ===
- Airdate - 26 April 2021
- Challenge: "Hero's Quest" - The teams had 12 hours to build an adventure from a map section selected by 'first in best dressed'. The winner of the challenge received immunity from the next Elimination Challenge.

Team	Lego Design	Result
Harrison & Michael	Jungle: Temple of the Tiger	Challenge Winners - Top One
Owen & Scott	Mediterranean: The Minotaur	Safe - Top two
David & Gus	Desert: Anubis	Safe
Sarah & Fleur	Frozenland: The Snow Witch	Safe
Anthony & Jess	Caribbean: The Kraken	Safe
Ryan & Gabby	Highland: Loch Ness Monster	Safe

=== Challenge 6 ===
- Airdate - 27 April 2021
- Challenge: "Cut in Half" - Each team had 10 hours to make a creation that builds on the other half of an object already cut in half. The team with the weakest design link was eliminated.

Team	Lego Design	Result
Harrison & Michael	N/A	Immunity
David & Gus	Original Half: Boombox; Designed Half: Ka-boom box explosion	Challenge Winners - Top One
Ryan & Gabby	Original Half: Cash Register; Designed Half: Cha-ching kitty-cash socialite	Safe - Top two
Owen & Scott	Original Half: Gramophone; Designed Half: Tree of life love song	Safe
Sarah & Fleur	Original Half: Chainsaw; Designed Half: Treehouse under attack	Safe - Bottom two
Anthony & Jess	Original Half: Telescope; Designed Half: Rocket man	Eliminated

=== Challenge 7 ===
- Airdate - 2 May 2021
- Advantage Challenge: "Will They Fly?" - Teams were given five hours to build a creation that when suspended from a helium-filled weather balloon would remain neutrally buoyant (floating) for a count of 10 seconds. The winner of the challenge received an advantage of an extra 30 minutes for the elimination challenge.
- Elimination Challenge: "Kale Scale" - The teams were given eight hours to make a creation as tall as Kale Frost from Lego Master Australia Season 1, but an extra restriction was that the creation could not be a building or a tower. The team with the weakest story elements and aesthetics in the build was eliminated.

Team	Lego Design	Result
Advantage Challenge - “Will They Fly?”
Ryan & Gabby	The Flying Machine	Advantage - Top One (Also removed Brick of Doom)
David & Gus	Pegasus	Through to Elimination Challenge
Harrison & Michael	Harry's Love Life	Through to Elimination Challenge
Sarah & Fleur	Picnic Basket	Through to Elimination Challenge
Owen & Scott	Astronaut	Disqualified - Failed flight challenge
Elimination Challenge - “Kale Scale”
David & Gus	Charmed Snake	Challenge Winners - Top One
Sarah & Fleur	Minifig Crossing Sign	Build collapsed with 40 seconds left - used "The Platinum Brick"
Owen & Scott	Rocket	Safe
Harrison & Michael	Fisherman on a Wharf	Safe
Ryan & Gabby	The Fountain	Eliminated

=== Challenge 8 ===
- Airdate - 3 May 2021
- Challenge: "Four Seasons" - Four eliminated teams return for a second chance challenge. The teams were given ten hours to create one of the four seasons at minifig scale on a giant baseplate. The two teams with the best storyline, use of technical skills and aesthetics were returned to the competition.

Team	Lego Design	Result
Ryan & Gabby	Winter: Train Heist	Won
Anthony & Jess	Autumn: Camping Adventure	Won
Amy & Dawei	Spring: Phoenix	Lost
Atlanta & Jeff	Summer: Ice Cream Monster Attack	Lost

=== Challenge 9 ===
- Airdate - 4 May 2021
- Challenge: "Arcade Game" - The teams had 12 hours to build an original arcade game based on a blind minifig pick. The winner of the challenge received immunity from the next Elimination Challenge.

Team	Lego Design	Result
Owen & Scott	80s Rock Star: Strum King	Challenge Winners - Top One
Ryan & Gabby	Space Warrior: Galaxy Girl	Safe - Top two
Sarah & Fleur	Zombie Cheerleader: Zombie High	Safe
David & Gus	Dragonboy: Dragon Warz	Safe
Harrison & Michael	Skatergirl: SK8 Racer	Safe
Anthony & Jess	Daredevil: Jump Start	Safe

=== Challenge 10 ===
- Airdate - 9 May 2021
- Advantage Challenge: "Race" - Teams were given four hours to build a vehicle without using wheels and tyres that can race down a purpose-built track in the shortest time after several heats. The winner of the challenge received an advantage of an extra 1 hour for the next Elimination Challenge. Season 2's Trent Cucchiarelli came to provide commentary.
- Elimination Challenge: "Dream Home" - Teams were given 11 hours to build their ultimate dream house with a nightmare twist added with three hours left in the build. The team with the weakest design was eliminated.

Team	Lego Design	Result
Advantage Challenge - “Race”
Owen & Scott	N/A	Immunity
Anthony & Jess	3 wheel dragster	Advantage
Ryan & Gabby	Tube racer	Safe
Harrison & Michael	Tank treads	Safe
David & Gus	Rubber tread wheels	Eliminated Heat 2
Sarah & Fleur	Roundey holey wheels	Eliminated Heat 1
Elimination Challenge - “Dream Home”
Owen & Scott	N/A	Immunity
Ryan & Gabby	Dream House: Ultimate Family Retreat; Nightmare: Sugar Rush Ice Cream Van	Challenge Winners - Top One
David & Gus	Dream House: Amazon Tree House; Nightmare: Anaconda Attack	Safe - Top two
Sarah & Fleur	Dream House: Beverley Hills House of Art & Music; Nightmare: Tax Auditor	Safe
Harrison & Michael	Dream House: Tiny home in a canyon Nightmare: Construction Site City	Safe - Bottom two
Anthony & Jess	Dream House: Seaside mansion Nightmare: Tsunami	Eliminated

=== Challenge 11 ===
- Airdate - 10 May 2021
- Challenge: "Heroic Moment of Impact" - Teams were given 10 hours to create an action scene from the Marvel Cinematic Universe. Teams have to show motion and energy without actual movement from motors or technic. Teams chose a minifig that gave a location for their diorama. Teams were given access to a secret Brick Pit and collection of Mini Fig characters for a build that needs to show a heroic moment of impact from the Marvel Cinematic Universe. The winner of the challenge was given immunity for the next Elimination Challenge.

Team	Lego Design	Result
Scott & Owen	Setting: Dr Strange / Sanctum Sanctorum; Scene: Battle with Squid Monster	Challenge Winners - Top One
David & Gus	Setting: Captain America / Helicarrier; Scene: Fighting Red Skull Mech Robot	Safe - Top two
Ryan & Gabby	Setting: Thor / Asgard; Scene: Ice Demon Attack	Safe
Harrison & Michael	Setting: Black Panther / Wakanda; Scene: Thanos Shock Wave	Safe
Sarah & Fleur	Setting: Iron Man / Avengers Tower; Scene: Attack on the Helipad	Safe

=== Challenge 12 ===
- Airdate - 11 May 2021
- Challenge: "Colour your world" - Teams were provided with a pre-built, identical, greyscale house which they had to bring to life with colour during a 12-hour build. The team with the least impressive story and aesthetics were eliminated.

Team	Lego Design	Result
Scott & Owen	N/A	Immunity
Ryan & Gabby	Rainbow Paint Truck Crash	Challenge Winners - Top One
Sarah & Fleur	Planter Box & Rainbow Watering Can	Safe
David & Gus	Unicorn Stampede	Safe
Harrison & Michael	Mother Nature	Eliminated

=== Challenge 13 ===
- Airdate - 16 May 2021
- Challenge: "Out on a Limb" - the four remaining teams were given 10 hours to dress an empty tree branch that was connected to a life-size LEGO tree. After the initial build, the base of the tree was opened to reveal an underground area. Teams were given 5 hours to add an underground element to their build as well as modify the branch build to suit. The team with the least impressive build were eliminated.

Team	Lego Design	Result
David & Gus	Branch: Tiger in a Tree; Underground: Meerkat Burrow	Challenge Winners - Top One
Scott & Owen	Branch: Elvish Village; Underground: Spider King's Lair	Safe
Ryan & Gabby	Branch: Girl on a Swing; Underground: Time Capsule	Safe
Sarah & Fleur	Branch: Queen Bee; Underground: Bees Locker Room	Eliminated

=== Grand Finale ===
- Airdate - 17 May 2021
- Grand Finale Challenge - Over 28 hours, the remaining three teams are tasked with building something of their own choice; yet still needing to adhere to the criteria of technical skills, story-telling elements and overall aesthetic. The Team with the most votes would be crowned LEGO Masters champions and claim the $100,000 prize.
- Voting & Judgment - The 250 members of the public judged the builds, assigning their Blue Bricks (worth 1 vote) to whichever model they liked most. Completing the vote, Brickman was given a Golden Brick worth 100 votes.

Team	Lego Design	Result
David & Gus	The Forest	Winners
Scott & Owen	Engineers vs Hippies	Runners up
Ryan & Gabby	The Circus	Eliminated

== Ratings ==
No.	Title	Air date	Timeslot	Overnight ratings		Consolidated ratings		Total viewers	Ref(s)
No.	Title	Air date	Timeslot	Viewers	Rank	Viewers	Rank	Total viewers	Ref(s)
1	Challenge 1	19 April 2021	Monday 7:30pm	838,000	5	187,000	2	1,025,000	
2	Challenge 2	20 April 2021	Tuesday 7:30pm	782,000	5	152,000	5	934,000	
3	Challenge 3	21 April 2021	Wednesday 7:30pm	766,000	5	178,000	2	944,000	
4	Challenge 4	25 April 2021	Sunday 7:00pm	715,000	5	178,000	3	893,000	
5	Challenge 5	26 April 2021	Monday 7:30pm	739,000	6	167,000	5	906,000	
6	Challenge 6	27 April 2021	Tuesday 7:30pm	725,000	6	142,000	5	867,000	
7	Challenge 7	2 May 2021	Sunday 7:00pm	811,000	3	98,000	3	909,000	
8	Challenge 8	3 May 2021	Monday 7:30pm	796,000	5	92,000	5	888,000	
9	Challenge 9	4 May 2021	Tuesday 7:30pm	700,000	5	88,000	5	788,000	
10	Challenge 10	9 May 2021	Sunday 7:00pm	767,000	3	80,000	3	847,000	
11	Challenge 11	10 May 2021	Monday 7:30pm	734,000	6	110,000	6	844,000	
12	Challenge 12	11 May 2021	Tuesday 7:30pm	683,000	6	137,000	5	820,000	
13	Challenge 13	16 May 2021	Sunday 7:00pm	901,000	3	63,000	2	964,000	
14	Grand Finale Winners Announced	17 May 2021	Monday 7:30pm Monday 9:00pm	932,000 1,030,000	6 2	89,000 74,000	4 1	1,021,000 1,104,000	
