= Brickvention =

Annual Lego convention held in Melbourne

Brickvention is an annual volunteer-run fan-based Lego convention held in Melbourne, Australia. Brickvention is held annually on the third weekend of January at the Royal Exhibition Building. Brickvention's 20th anniversary convention was held on 16–18 January 2026.

In 2016 Brickvention celebrated its 10th anniversary, sharing LEGO displays with over 20,000 members of the public.

Brickvention is facilitated by a volunteer Organisation called Brickventures Incorporated. 10 volunteers from around Victoria spend 12 months planning and organising the event for the wider community.

Brickvention has played host to LEGO Models from some of the world's greatest LEGO Builders. From its conception to 2016, LEGO Certified Professional Ryan McNaught was a guest judge of Brickvention and decided on prize winners for the annual competition element held for the accepted builders.
