= Logie Award for Most Outstanding Entertainment Program =

- Country: Australia
- Presented by: TV Week
- First award: 1986
- Currently held by: The Cheap Seats (2023)
- Website: www.tvweeklogieawards.com.au

The Silver Logie for Most Outstanding Entertainment Program is an award presented annually at the Australian TV Week Logie Awards. The award is given to recognise an outstanding Australian light entertainment series, from various formats including comedy, panel, talent, variety, music, talk, and traditional game shows. The winner and nominees of this award are chosen by television industry juries.

It was first awarded at the 28th Annual TV Week Logie Awards ceremony, held in 1986 as Best Light Entertainment Program but has had many changes over the years.

In previous years, programs would have qualified in different categories such as Best Australian Comedy (1967-1968, 1972–1974), Best Comedy Show (1969), Best Comedy (1970). Also, Best Variety Show (1961-1962), Best National Variety Show (1964) and Best Musical/Variety Show.

The category was awarded as the Most Outstanding Achievement in Comedy Program from 1994 to 1998 but in 1999, the category was dropped. From 2000, the award category was restored as Most Outstanding Comedy Program.

In 2010, the category was changed to Most Outstanding Light Entertainment Program which included comedy panel, talent and variety shows. From 2015, the category was split into Most Outstanding Entertainment Program and a reinstated Most Outstanding Comedy Program category. This award categories were eliminated again in 2018.

From 2019, the Most Outstanding Entertainment Program category was reinstated and includes comedy, panel, talent, variety, music, talk, and traditional game shows.

== Winners and nominees ==
Key	Meaning
‡	Indicates the winning program

Listed below is the winner of the award for Best Light Entertainment Series:

Year	Program	Network	Ref
1986	The Gillies Report‡	ABC	

See Logie Award for Most Outstanding Comedy Program for winners between 1994 and 2009.

Listed below are the winners of the award for each year for Most Outstanding Light Entertainment Series:

Year	Program	Network	Ref
2010	Talkin' 'Bout Your Generation‡	Network Ten	
2010	Chandon Pictures	Movie Network	
2010	Thank God You're Here	Seven Network	
2010	The Chaser's War On Everything	ABC	
2010	Wilfred	SBS	
2011	Spicks and Specks‡	ABC	
2011	Hamish & Andy's Caravan of Courage: Great Britain & Ireland	Network Ten	
2011	Luke Nguyen's Vietnam	SBS	
2011	Talkin' 'Bout Your Generation	Network Ten	
2011	Yes We Canberra!	ABC	
2012	Spicks and Specks‡	ABC	
2012	Australia's Got Talent	Seven Network	
2012	Gruen Planet	ABC	
2012	The Project	Network Ten	
2012	Talkin' 'Bout Your Generation	Network Ten	
2013	The X Factor‡	Seven Network	
2013	Hamish and Andy's Caravan of Courage: Australia Vs New Zealand	Nine Network	
2013	Shaun Micallef's Mad as Hell	ABC	
2013	The Hamster Wheel	ABC	
2013	The Voice	Nine Network	
2014	Housos‡	SBS1	
2014	It's a Date	ABC1	
2014	Please Like Me	ABC2	
2014	Upper Middle Bogan	ABC	
2014	The Voice	Nine Network	

Listed below are the winners of the award for each year for Most Outstanding Entertainment Program from 2015 to 2017:

Year	Program	Network	Ref
2015	The Voice‡	Nine Network	
2015	Bogan Hunters	7mate	
2015	The Chaser's Media Circus	ABC	
2015	The Checkout	ABC	
2015	Shaun Micallef's Mad as Hell	ABC	
2016	Gruen‡	ABC	
2016	Have You Been Paying Attention?	Network Ten	
2016	The Voice	Nine Network	
2016	The Weekly with Charlie Pickering	ABC	
2016	The X Factor	Seven Network	
2017	Have You Been Paying Attention?‡	Network Ten	
2017	Anh's Brush with Fame	ABC	
2017	Gruen	ABC	
2017	The Weekly with Charlie Pickering	ABC	
2017	The Voice	Nine Network	
2019	Have You Been Paying Attention?‡	Network Ten	
2019	Australian Ninja Warrior	Nine Network	
2019	Eurovision – Australia Decides 2018	SBS	
2019	Gogglebox Australia	Foxtel/Network Ten	
2019	True Story with Hamish & Andy	Nine Network	
2022	Lego Masters‡	Nine Network	
2022	Hard Quiz	ABC	
2022	Shaun Micallef's Mad as Hell	ABC	
2022	The Masked Singer Australia	Network Ten	
2022	The Voice	Seven Network	
2023	The Cheap Seats‡	Network Ten	
2023	Gruen Nation	ABC	
2023	Hard Quiz	ABC	
2023	Lego Masters	Nine Network	
2023	RuPaul's Drag Race Down Under	Stan	
2023	The Masked Singer Australia	Network Ten	

== See also ==
- Logie Award for Most Popular Entertainment Program
- Logie Award for Most Outstanding Comedy Program
- Logie Award for Most Popular Comedy Program
