= 2020 Australian Open – Day-by-day summaries =

The 2020 Australian Open described in detail, in the form of day-by-day summaries.

All dates are AEDT (UTC+11)

== Day 1 (20 January) ==
- Seeds out:
  - Men's singles: (Canada) Denis Shapovalov [13], (Croatia) Borna Ćorić [25]
  - Women's singles: (United States) Sloane Stephens [24], (Czech Republic) Barbora Strýcová [32]
- Schedule of play

Matches on main courts
Matches on Rod Laver Arena
Event	Winner	Loser	Score
Women's singles 1st round	(Japan) Naomi Osaka [3]	(Czech Republic) Marie Bouzková	6–2, 6–4
Women's singles 1st round	(United States) Serena Williams [8]	(Russia) Anastasia Potapova	6–0, 6–3
Men's singles 1st round	(Switzerland) Roger Federer [3]	(United States) Steve Johnson	6–3, 6–2, 6–2
Women's singles 1st round	(Australia) Ashleigh Barty [1]	(Ukraine) Lesia Tsurenko	5–7, 6–1, 6–1
Men's singles 1st round	(Serbia) Novak Djokovic [2]	(Germany) Jan-Lennard Struff	7–6^{(7–5)}, 6–2, 2–6, 6–1
Matches on Margaret Court Arena
Event	Winner	Loser	Score
Men's singles 1st round	(Hungary) Márton Fucsovics	(Canada) Denis Shapovalov [13]	6–3, 6–7^{(7–9)}, 6–1, 7–6^{(7–3)}
Women's singles 1st round	(Czech Republic) Petra Kvitová [7]	(Czech Republic) Kateřina Siniaková	6–1, 6–0
Women's singles 1st round	(United States) Coco Gauff	(United States) Venus Williams	7–6^{(7–5)}, 6–3
Men's singles 1st round	(Greece) Stefanos Tsitsipas [6]	(Italy) Salvatore Caruso	6–0, 6–2, 6–3
Women's singles 1st round	(China) Zhang Shuai	(United States) Sloane Stephens [24]	2–6, 7–5, 6–2
Matches on Melbourne Arena
Event	Winner	Loser	Score
Men's singles 1st round	(Italy) Matteo Berrettini [8]	(Australia) Andrew Harris [WC]	6–3, 6–1, 6–3
Women's singles 1st round	(Denmark) Caroline Wozniacki	(United States) Kristie Ahn	6–1, 6–3
Men's singles 1st round	(Bulgaria) Grigor Dimitrov [18]	(Argentina) Juan Ignacio Londero	4–6, 6–2, 6–0, 6–4
Women's singles 1st round	(United States) Caty McNally [Q]	(Australia) Samantha Stosur	6–1, 6–4
Men's singles 1st round	(Germany) Philipp Kohlschreiber	(United States) Marcos Giron	7–5, 6–1, 6–2
Matches on 1573 Arena
Event	Winner	Loser	Score
Men's singles 1st round	(United States) Sam Querrey	(Croatia) Borna Ćorić [25]	6–3, 6–4, 6–4
Men's singles 1st round	(United States) Reilly Opelka vs. (Italy) Fabio Fognini [12]		6–3, 7–6^{(7–3)}, 1–0, suspended
Coloured background indicates a night match
Day matches began at 11 am, whilst night matches began at 7 pm AEDT

== Day 2 (21 January) ==
- Seeds out:
  - Men's singles: (Canada) Félix Auger-Aliassime [20], (France) Jo-Wilfried Tsonga [28]
  - Women's singles: (United Kingdom) Johanna Konta [12], (Czech Republic) Markéta Vondroušová [15], (United States) Amanda Anisimova [21], (Latvia) Anastasija Sevastova [31]
- Schedule of play

Matches on main courts
Matches on Rod Laver Arena
Event	Winner	Loser	Score
Women's singles 1st round	(Czech Republic) Karolína Plíšková [2]	(France) Kristina Mladenovic	6–1, 7–5
Women's singles 1st round	(Croatia) Donna Vekić [19]	(Russia) Maria Sharapova [WC]	6–3, 6–4
Men's singles 1st round	(Spain) Rafael Nadal [1]	(Bolivia) Hugo Dellien	6–2, 6–3, 6–0
Men's singles 1st round	(Russia) Daniil Medvedev [4]	(United States) Frances Tiafoe	6–3, 4–6, 6–4, 6–2
Women's singles 1st round	(Germany) Angelique Kerber [17]	(Italy) Elisabetta Cocciaretto [Q]	6–2, 6–2
Matches on Margaret Court Arena
Event	Winner	Loser	Score
Women's singles 1st round	(Switzerland) Belinda Bencic [6]	(Slovakia) Anna Karolína Schmiedlová [PR]	6–3, 7–5
Men's singles 1st round	(Austria) Dominic Thiem [5]	(France) Adrian Mannarino	6–3, 7–5, 6–2
Women's singles 1st round	(Australia) Ajla Tomljanović	(Latvia) Anastasija Sevastova [31]	6–1, 6–1
Women's singles 1st round	(Romania) Simona Halep [4]	(United States) Jennifer Brady	7–6^{(7–5)}, 6–1
Men's singles 1st round	(Germany) Alexander Zverev [7]	(Italy) Marco Cecchinato	6–4, 7–6^{(7–4)}, 6–3
Matches on Melbourne Arena
Event	Winner	Loser	Score
Women's singles 1st round	(Slovenia) Polona Hercog	(Sweden) Rebecca Peterson	6–3, 6–3
Women's singles 1st round	(United States) Madison Keys [10]	(Russia) Daria Kasatkina	6–3, 6–1
Men's singles 1st round	(Switzerland) Stan Wawrinka [15]	(Bosnia and Herzegovina) Damir Džumhur	7–5, 6–7^{(4–7)}, 6–4, 6–4
Men's singles 1st round	(Australia) Alexei Popyrin	(France) Jo-Wilfried Tsonga [28]	6–7^{(5–7)}, 6–2, 6–1, 0–0, retired
Men's singles 1st round	(Australia) Nick Kyrgios [23]	(Italy) Lorenzo Sonego	6–2, 7–6^{(7–3)}, 7–6^{(7–1)}
Women's singles 1st round	(Australia) Priscilla Hon [WC]	(Ukraine) Kateryna Kozlova	6–3, 6–4
Matches on 1573 Arena
Event	Winner	Loser	Score
Women's singles 1st round	(Tunisia) Ons Jabeur	(United Kingdom) Johanna Konta [12]	6–4, 6–2
Men's singles 1st round	(Italy) Fabio Fognini [12]	(United States) Reilly Opelka	3–6, 6–7^{(3–7)}, 6–4, 6–3, 7–6^{(10–5)}
Men's singles 1st round	(Latvia) Ernests Gulbis [Q]	(Canada) Félix Auger-Aliassime [20]	7–5, 4–6, 7–6^{(7–4)}, 6–4
Women's singles 1st round	(Ukraine) Elina Svitolina [5]	(United Kingdom) Katie Boulter [PR]	6–4, 7–5
Men's singles 1st round	(France) Gaël Monfils [10]	(Chinese Taipei) Lu Yen-hsun [PR]	6–1, 6–4, 6–2
Men's singles 1st round	(South Africa) Kevin Anderson	(Belarus) Ilya Ivashka [Q]	6–4, 2–6, 4–6, 6–4, 7–6^{(10–8)}
Coloured background indicates a night match
Day matches began at 11 am on first three courts above and 10:30 am on all other courts, whilst night matches began at 7 pm AEDT

== Day 3 (22 January) ==
- Seeds out:
  - Men's singles: (Italy) Matteo Berrettini [8], (Bulgaria) Grigor Dimitrov [18], (France) Benoît Paire [21], (United Kingdom) Dan Evans [30], (Poland) Hubert Hurkacz [31]
  - Women's singles: (Belarus) Aryna Sabalenka [11], (Croatia) Petra Martić [13], (Ukraine) Dayana Yastremska [23]
  - Men's doubles: (Germany) Kevin Krawietz / (Germany) Andreas Mies [3]
  - Women's doubles: (United States) Nicole Melichar / (China) Xu Yifan [5], (Ukraine) Lyudmyla Kichenok / (China) Yang Zhaoxuan [14]
- Schedule of play

Matches on main courts
Matches on Rod Laver Arena
Event	Winner	Loser	Score
Women's singles 2nd round	(Czech Republic) Petra Kvitová [7]	(Spain) Paula Badosa	7–5, 7–5
Women's singles 2nd round	(Australia) Ashleigh Barty [1]	(Slovenia) Polona Hercog	6–1, 6–4
Men's singles 2nd round	(Serbia) Novak Djokovic [2]	(Japan) Tatsuma Ito [WC]	6–1, 6–4, 6–2
Women's singles 2nd round	(United States) Serena Williams [8]	(Slovenia) Tamara Zidanšek	6–2, 6–3
Men's singles 2nd round	(Switzerland) Roger Federer [3]	(Serbia) Filip Krajinović	6–1, 6–4, 6–1
Women's singles 2nd round	(United States) Madison Keys [10]	(Netherlands) Arantxa Rus	7–6^{(7–3)}, 6–2
Matches on Margaret Court Arena
Event	Winner	Loser	Score
Women's singles 2nd round	(Japan) Naomi Osaka [3]	(China) Zheng Saisai	6–2, 6–4
Women's singles 2nd round	(Denmark) Caroline Wozniacki	(Ukraine) Dayana Yastremska [23]	7–5, 7–5
Men's singles 2nd round	(United States) Tommy Paul	(Bulgaria) Grigor Dimitrov [18]	6–4, 7–6^{(8–6)}, 3–6, 6–7^{(3–7)}, 7–6^{(10–3)}
Men's singles 2nd round	(Italy) Fabio Fognini [12]	(Australia) Jordan Thompson	7–6^{(7–4)}, 6–1, 3–6, 4–6, 7–6^{(10–4)}
Matches on Melbourne Arena
Event	Winner	Loser	Score
Women's singles 2nd round	(Germany) Julia Görges	(Croatia) Petra Martić [13]	4–6, 6–3, 7–5
Women's singles 2nd round	(United States) Coco Gauff	(Romania) Sorana Cîrstea	4–6, 6–3, 7–5
Men's singles 2nd round	(Canada) Milos Raonic [32]	(Chile) Cristian Garín	6–3, 6–4, 6–2
Men's singles 2nd round	(Australia) John Millman	(Poland) Hubert Hurkacz [31]	6–4, 7–5, 6–3
Men's singles 2nd round	(Spain) Roberto Bautista Agut [9]	(United States) Michael Mmoh [WC]	5–7, 6–2, 6–4, 6–1 (Note: This match started on 1573 Arena, but at 2–2 in the third set, the match was suspended due to rain. The match moved to Melbourne Arena following the conclusion of the Hurkacz-Millman match, where it finished the same day.)
Matches on 1573 Arena
Event	Winner	Loser	Score
Women's singles 1st round	(Spain) Carla Suárez Navarro	(Belarus) Aryna Sabalenka [11]	7–6^{(8–6)}, 7–6^{(8–6)}
Women's singles 1st round	(Belgium) Elise Mertens [16]	(Montenegro) Danka Kovinić	6–2, 6–0
Men's singles 2nd round	(United States) Tennys Sandgren	(Italy) Matteo Berrettini [8]	7–6^{(9–7)}, 6–4, 4–6, 2–6, 7–5
Coloured background indicates a night match
Day matches began at 11 am, whilst night matches began at 7 pm AEDT

== Day 4 (23 January) ==
- Seeds out:
  - Men's singles: (Georgia (country)) Nikoloz Basilashvili [26]
  - Women's singles: (Czech Republic) Karolína Muchová [20], (United States) Danielle Collins [26]
- Schedule of play

Matches on main courts
Matches on Rod Laver Arena
Event	Winner	Loser	Score
Women's singles 2nd round	(Spain) Garbiñe Muguruza	(Australia) Ajla Tomljanović	6–3, 3–6, 6–3
Women's singles 2nd round	(Czech Republic) Karolína Plíšková [2]	(Germany) Laura Siegemund	6–3, 6–3
Men's singles 2nd round	(Germany) Alexander Zverev [7]	(Belarus) Egor Gerasimov	7–6^{(7–5)}, 6–4, 7–5
Women's singles 2nd round	(Romania) Simona Halep [4]	(United Kingdom) Harriet Dart [Q]	6–2, 6–4
Men's singles 2nd round	(Spain) Rafael Nadal [1]	(Argentina) Federico Delbonis	6–3, 7–6^{(7–4)}, 6–1
Matches on Margaret Court Arena
Event	Winner	Loser	Score
Women's singles 2nd round	(Switzerland) Belinda Bencic [6]	(Latvia) Jeļena Ostapenko	7–5, 7–5
Men's singles 2nd round	(Russia) Daniil Medvedev [4]	(Spain) Pedro Martínez [Q]	7–5, 6–1, 6–3
Women's singles 2nd round	(Germany) Angelique Kerber [17]	(Australia) Priscilla Hon [WC]	6–3, 6–2
Men's singles 2nd round	(Switzerland) Stan Wawrinka [15]	(Italy) Andreas Seppi	4–6, 7–5, 6–3, 3–6, 6–4
Women's singles 2nd round	(Ukraine) Elina Svitolina [5]	(United States) Lauren Davis	6–2, 7–6^{(8–6)}
Matches on Melbourne Arena
Event	Winner	Loser	Score
Women's singles 2nd round	(Croatia) Donna Vekić [19]	(France) Alizé Cornet	6–4, 6–2
Women's doubles 1st round	(Australia) Ashleigh Barty (Germany) Julia Görges	(Australia) Jessica Moore [WC] (Australia) Astra Sharma [WC]	6–2, 6–3
Men's singles 2nd round	(Austria) Dominic Thiem [5]	(Australia) Alex Bolt [WC]	6–2, 5–7, 6–7^{(5–7)}, 6–1, 6–2
Men's singles 2nd round	(Australia) Nick Kyrgios [23]	(France) Gilles Simon	6–2, 6–4, 4–6, 7–5
Matches on 1573 Arena
Event	Winner	Loser	Score
Women's singles 2nd round	(United States) Catherine Bellis [PR]	(Czech Republic) Karolína Muchová [20]	6–4, 6–4
Men's singles 2nd round	(France) Gaël Monfils [10]	(Croatia) Ivo Karlović	4–6, 7–6^{(10–8)}, 6–4, 7–5
Men's singles 2nd round	(United States) Taylor Fritz [29]	(South Africa) Kevin Anderson	4–6, 6–7^{(5–7)}, 7–6^{(7–4)}, 6–2, 6–2
Coloured background indicates a night match
Day matches began at 11 am, whilst night matches began at 7 pm AEDT

== Day 5 (24 January) ==
- Seeds out:
  - Men's singles: (Greece) Stefanos Tsitsipas [6], (Spain) Roberto Bautista Agut [9], (Argentina) Guido Pella [22], (Serbia) Dušan Lajović [24]
  - Women's singles: (Japan) Naomi Osaka [3], (United States) Serena Williams [8], (United States) Madison Keys [10], (Russia) Ekaterina Alexandrova [25], (Kazakhstan) Elena Rybakina [29]
  - Men's doubles: (France) Pierre-Hugues Herbert / (France) Nicolas Mahut [1], (Netherlands) Jean-Julien Rojer / (Romania) Horia Tecău [8], (South Africa) Raven Klaasen / (Austria) Oliver Marach [9], (Austria) Jürgen Melzer / (France) Édouard Roger-Vasselin [12]
  - Women's doubles: (China) Duan Yingying / (China) Zheng Saisai [9], (Czech Republic) Lucie Hradecká / (Slovenia) Andreja Klepač [11], (Australia) Ellen Perez / (Australia) Samantha Stosur [12]
- Schedule of play

Matches on main courts
Matches on Rod Laver Arena
Event	Winner	Loser	Score
Women's singles 3rd round	(Australia) Ashleigh Barty [1]	(Kazakhstan) Elena Rybakina [29]	6–3, 6–2
Women's singles 3rd round	(China) Wang Qiang [27]	(United States) Serena Williams [8]	6–4, 6–7^{(2–7)}, 7–5
Men's singles 3rd round	(Serbia) Novak Djokovic [2]	(Japan) Yoshihito Nishioka	6–3, 6–2, 6–2
Women's singles 3rd round	(United States) Coco Gauff	(Japan) Naomi Osaka [3]	6–3, 6–4
Men's singles 3rd round	(Switzerland) Roger Federer [3]	(Australia) John Millman	4–6, 7–6^{(7–2)}, 6–4, 4–6, 7–6^{(10–8)}
Matches on Margaret Court Arena
Event	Winner	Loser	Score
Men's singles 3rd round	(Argentina) Diego Schwartzman [14]	(Serbia) Dušan Lajović [24]	6–2, 6–3, 7–6^{(9–7)}
Women's singles 3rd round	(Czech Republic) Petra Kvitová [7]	(Russia) Ekaterina Alexandrova [25]	6–1, 6–2
Women's singles 3rd round	(Greece) Maria Sakkari [22]	(United States) Madison Keys [10]	6–4, 6–4
Men's singles 3rd round	(Canada) Milos Raonic [32]	(Greece) Stefanos Tsitsipas [6]	7–5, 6–4, 7–6^{(7–2)}
Women's singles 3rd round	(United States) Sofia Kenin [14]	(China) Zhang Shuai	7–5, 7–6^{(9–7)}
Matches on Melbourne Arena
Event	Winner	Loser	Score
Men's doubles 1st round	(South Korea) Nam Ji-sung [WC] (South Korea) Song Min-kyu [WC]	(Australia) Lleyton Hewitt [WC] (Australia) Jordan Thompson [WC]	6–2, 6–3
Women's singles 3rd round	(Tunisia) Ons Jabeur	(Denmark) Caroline Wozniacki	7–5, 3–6, 7–5
Men's singles 3rd round	(Croatia) Marin Čilić	(Spain) Roberto Bautista Agut [9]	6–7^{(3–7)}, 6–4, 6–0, 5–7, 6–3
Men's singles 3rd round	(Italy) Fabio Fognini [12]	(Argentina) Guido Pella [22]	7–6^{(7–0)}, 6–2, 6–3
Matches on 1573 Arena
Event	Winner	Loser	Score
Women's doubles 1st round	(Hungary) Tímea Babos [2] (France) Kristina Mladenovic [2]	(Slovenia) Dalila Jakupović (Romania) Raluca Olaru	7–5, 6–3
Men's singles 3rd round	(Hungary) Márton Fucsovics	(United States) Tommy Paul	6–1, 6–1, 6–4
Women's singles 3rd round	(United States) Alison Riske [18]	(Germany) Julia Görges	1–6, 7–6^{(7–4)}, 6–2
Men's singles 3rd round	(United States) Tennys Sandgren	(United States) Sam Querrey	6–4, 6–4, 6–4
Coloured background indicates a night match
Day matches began at 11 am, whilst night matches began at 7 pm AEDT

== Day 6 (25 January) ==
- Seeds out:
  - Men's singles: (Belgium) David Goffin [11], (Russia) Karen Khachanov [16], (United States) John Isner [19], (Spain) Pablo Carreño Busta [27], (United States) Taylor Fritz [29]
  - Women's singles: (Czech Republic) Karolína Plíšková [2], (Ukraine) Elina Svitolina [5], (Switzerland) Belinda Bencic [6], (Croatia) Donna Vekić [19]
  - Men's doubles: (Poland) Łukasz Kubot / (Brazil) Marcelo Melo [2], (Netherlands) Wesley Koolhof / (Croatia) Nikola Mektić [5], (United Kingdom) Jamie Murray / (United Kingdom) Neal Skupski [14], (Argentina) Máximo González / (France) Fabrice Martin [15]
  - Women's doubles: (Czech Republic) Květa Peschke / (Netherlands) Demi Schuurs [8]
- Schedule of play

Matches on main courts
Matches on Rod Laver Arena
Event	Winner	Loser	Score
Women's singles 3rd round	(Russia) Anastasia Pavlyuchenkova [30]	(Czech Republic) Karolína Plíšková [2]	7–6^{(7–4)}, 7–6^{(7–3)}
Women's singles 3rd round	(Romania) Simona Halep [4]	(Kazakhstan) Yulia Putintseva	6–1, 6–4
Men's singles 3rd round	(Spain) Rafael Nadal [1]	(Spain) Pablo Carreño Busta [27]	6–1, 6–2, 6–4
Women's singles 3rd round	(Spain) Garbiñe Muguruza	(Ukraine) Elina Svitolina [5]	6–1, 6–2
Men's singles 3rd round	(Russia) Daniil Medvedev [4]	(Australia) Alexei Popyrin	6–4, 6–3, 6–2
Matches on Margaret Court Arena
Event	Winner	Loser	Score
Women's singles 3rd round	(Germany) Angelique Kerber [17]	(Italy) Camila Giorgi	6–2, 6–7^{(4–7)}, 6–3
Women's singles 3rd round	(Estonia) Anett Kontaveit [28]	(Switzerland) Belinda Bencic [6]	6–0, 6–1
Men's singles 3rd round	(Austria) Dominic Thiem [5]	(United States) Taylor Fritz [29]	6–2, 6–4, 6–7^{(5–7)}, 6–4
Men's singles 3rd round	(Germany) Alexander Zverev [7]	(Spain) Fernando Verdasco	6–2, 6–2, 6–4
Women's singles 3rd round	(Netherlands) Kiki Bertens [9]	(Kazakhstan) Zarina Diyas	6–2, 7–6^{(7–3)}
Matches on Melbourne Arena
Event	Winner	Loser	Score
Men's Legends doubles Round Robin	(France) Mansour Bahrami (France) Fabrice Santoro	(South Africa) Wayne Ferreira (Croatia) Goran Ivanišević	4–2, 3–4^{(2–5)}, 4–2
Men's singles 3rd round	(France) Gaël Monfils [10]	(Latvia) Ernests Gulbis [Q]	7–6^{(7–2)}, 6–4, 6–3
Women's singles 3rd round	(Belgium) Elise Mertens [16]	(United States) Catherine Bellis [PR]	6–1, 6–7^{(5–7)}, 6–0
Men's singles 3rd round	(Australia) Nick Kyrgios [23]	(Russia) Karen Khachanov [16]	6–2, 7–6^{(7–5)}, 6–7^{(6–8)}, 6–7^{(7–9)}, 7–6^{(10–8)}
Matches on 1573 Arena
Event	Winner	Loser	Score
Men's doubles 2nd round	(Australia) James Duckworth [WC] (Australia) Marc Polmans [WC]	(Netherlands) Wesley Koolhof [5] (Croatia) Nikola Mektić [5]	7–5, 6–3
Women's singles 3rd round	(Poland) Iga Świątek	(Croatia) Donna Vekić [19]	7–5, 6–3
Men's singles 3rd round	(Russia) Andrey Rublev [17]	(Belgium) David Goffin [11]	2–6, 7–6^{(7–3)}, 6–4, 7–6^{(7–4)}
Mixed doubles 1st round	(Poland) Iga Świątek (Poland) Łukasz Kubot	(Australia) Ellen Perez (Australia) Luke Saville [WC]	6–4, 7–5
Coloured background indicates a night match
Day matches began at 11 am, whilst night matches began at 7 pm AEDT

== Day 7 (26 January) ==
- Seeds out:
  - Men's singles: (Italy) Fabio Fognini [12], (Argentina) Diego Schwartzman [14]
  - Women's singles: (United States) Alison Riske [18], (Greece) Maria Sakkari [22], (China) Wang Qiang [27]
  - Men's doubles: (Australia) John Peers / (New Zealand) Michael Venus [7], (Croatia) Mate Pavić / (Brazil) Bruno Soares [10]
  - Mixed doubles: (Czech Republic) Barbora Strýcová / (Brazil) Marcelo Melo [1]
- Schedule of play

Matches on main courts
Matches on Rod Laver Arena
Event	Winner	Loser	Score
Men's Legends doubles Round Robin	(United States) John McEnroe (United States) Patrick McEnroe	(Austria) Thomas Muster (Sweden) Mats Wilander	4–2, 4–1
Women's singles 4th Round	(Czech Republic) Petra Kvitová [7]	(Greece) Maria Sakkari [22]	6–7^{(4–7)}, 6–3, 6–2
Men's singles 4th Round	(Serbia) Novak Djokovic [2]	(Argentina) Diego Schwartzman [14]	6–3, 6–4, 6–4
Women's singles 4th Round	(Australia) Ashleigh Barty [1]	(United States) Alison Riske [18]	6–3, 1–6, 6–4
Men's singles 4th Round	(Switzerland) Roger Federer [3]	(Hungary) Márton Fucsovics	4–6, 6–1, 6–2, 6–2
Matches on Margaret Court Arena
Event	Winner	Loser	Score
Women's doubles 3rd round	(Chinese Taipei) Hsieh Su-wei [1] (Czech Republic) Barbora Strýcová [1]	(Croatia) Darija Jurak (Serbia) Nina Stojanović	6–4, 6–4
Men's singles 4th Round	(Canada) Milos Raonic [32]	(Croatia) Marin Čilić	6–4, 6–3, 7–5
Women's singles 4th Round	(Tunisia) Ons Jabeur	(China) Wang Qiang [27]	7–6^{(7–4)}, 6–1
Men's doubles 2nd round	(United States) Bob Bryan [13] (United States) Mike Bryan [13]	(Colombia) Juan Sebastian Cabal (Spain) Jaume Munar	7–6^{(7–5)}, 6–4
Matches on Melbourne Arena
Event	Winner	Loser	Score
Men's Legends doubles Round Robin	(Germany) Tommy Haas (Australia) Mark Phillipoussis	(Sweden) Jonas Björkman (Sweden) Thomas Johansson	4–3^{(5–1)}, 4–3^{(5–3)}
Men's doubles 3rd round	(Kazakhstan) Alexander Bublik (Kazakhstan) Mikhail Kukushkin	(United States) Steve Johnson (United States) Sam Querrey	6–4, 6–2
Women's singles 4th Round	(United States) Sofia Kenin [14]	(United States) Coco Gauff	6–7^{(5–7)}, 6–3, 6–0
Men's singles 4th Round	(United States) Tennys Sandgren	(Italy) Fabio Fognini [12]	7–6^{(7–5)}, 7–5, 6–7^{(2–7)}, 6–4
Coloured background indicates a night match
Day matches began at 11 am, whilst night matches began at 7 pm AEDT

== Day 8 (27 January) ==
- Seeds out:
  - Men's singles: (Russia) Daniil Medvedev [4], (France) Gaël Monfils [10], (Russia) Andrey Rublev [17], (Australia) Nick Kyrgios [23]
  - Women's singles: (Netherlands) Kiki Bertens [9], (Belgium) Elise Mertens [16], (Germany) Angelique Kerber [17]
  - Men's doubles: (Spain) Marcel Granollers / (Argentina) Horacio Zeballos [6], (United States) Bob Bryan / (United States) Mike Bryan [13], (United States) Austin Krajicek / (Croatia) Franko Škugor [16]
  - Women's doubles: (Japan) Shuko Aoyama / (Japan) Ena Shibahara [10], (Russia) Veronika Kudermetova / (United States) Alison Riske [13], (Slovakia) Viktória Kužmová / (Belarus) Aliaksandra Sasnovich [15], (United States) Sofia Kenin / (United States) Bethanie Mattek-Sands [16]
  - Mixed doubles: (Chinese Taipei) Chan Hao-ching / (New Zealand) Michael Venus [4], (Australia) Samantha Stosur / (Netherlands) Jean-Julien Rojer [7], (Chinese Taipei) Hsieh Su-wei / (United Kingdom) Neal Skupski [8]
- Schedule of play

Matches on main courts
Matches on Rod Laver Arena
Event	Winner	Loser	Score
Women's singles 4th Round	(Romania) Simona Halep [4]	(Belgium) Elise Mertens [16]	6–4, 6–4
Men's singles 4th Round	(Austria) Dominic Thiem [5]	(France) Gaël Monfils [10]	6–2, 6–4, 6–4
Women's singles 4th Round	(Spain) Garbiñe Muguruza	(Netherlands) Kiki Bertens [9]	6–3, 6–3
Men's singles 4th Round	(Spain) Rafael Nadal [1]	(Australia) Nick Kyrgios [23]	6–3, 3–6, 7–6^{(8–6)}, 7–6^{(7–4)}
Men's doubles quarterfinals	(Kazakhstan) Alexander Bublik (Kazakhstan) Mikhail Kukushkin	(Australia) James Duckworth (Australia) Marc Polmans [WC]	7–6^{(8–6)}, 7–5
Matches on Margaret Court Arena
Event	Winner	Loser	Score
Men's Legends doubles Round Robin	(Australia) Pat Cash (Australia) Mark Woodforde	(Austria) Thomas Muster (Sweden) Mats Wilander	4–1, 3–4^{(4–5)}, 4–3^{(5–1)}
Men's doubles 3rd round	(Finland) Henri Kontinen (Germany) Jan-Lennard Struff	(Italy) Simone Bolelli (France) Benoît Paire	7–5, 6–3
Men's singles 4th Round	(Switzerland) Stan Wawrinka [15]	(Russia) Daniil Medvedev [4]	6–2, 2–6, 4–6, 7–6^{(7–2)}, 6–2
Women's singles 4th Round	(Russia) Anastasia Pavlyuchenkova [30]	(Germany) Angelique Kerber [17]	6–7^{(5–7)}, 7–6^{(7–4)}, 6–2
Matches on Melbourne Arena
Event	Winner	Loser	Score
Men's Legends doubles Round Robin	(Germany) Tommy Haas (Australia) Mark Philippoussis	(France) Henri Leconte (Australia) Todd Woodbridge	3–4^{(3–5)}, 4–1, 4–1
Women's singles 4th Round	(Estonia) Anett Kontaveit [28]	(Poland) Iga Świątek	6–7^{(4–7)}, 7–5, 7–5
Men's doubles 3rd round	(Croatia) Ivan Dodig (Slovakia) Filip Polášek [4]	(United States) Bob Bryan (United States) Mike Bryan [13]	6–3, 6–4
Women's doubles 3rd round	(United States) Coco Gauff (United States) Caty McNally	(Japan) Shuko Aoyama [10] (Japan) Ena Shibahara [10]	4–6, 7–5, 6–3
Men's singles 4th Round	(Germany) Alexander Zverev [7]	(Russia) Andrey Rublev [17]	6–4, 6–4, 6–4
Coloured background indicates a night match
Day matches began at 11 am, whilst night matches began at 7 pm AEDT

== Day 9 (28 January) ==
- Seeds out:
  - Men's singles: (Canada) Milos Raonic [32]
  - Women's singles: (Czech Republic) Petra Kvitová [7]
  - Women's doubles: (Belgium) Elise Mertens / (Belarus) Aryna Sabalenka [3], (Canada) Gabriela Dabrowski / (Latvia) Jeļena Ostapenko [6]
- Schedule of play

Matches on main courts
Matches on Rod Laver Arena
Event	Winner	Loser	Score
Women's singles quarterfinals	(United States) Sofia Kenin [14]	(Tunisia) Ons Jabeur	6–4, 6–4
Women's singles quarterfinals	(Australia) Ashleigh Barty [1]	(Czech Republic) Petra Kvitová [7]	7–6^{(8–6)}, 6–2
Men's singles quarterfinals	(Switzerland) Roger Federer [3]	(United States) Tennys Sandgren	6–3, 2–6, 2–6, 7–6^{(10–8)}, 6–3
Men's singles quarterfinals	(Serbia) Novak Djokovic [2]	(Canada) Milos Raonic [32]	6–4, 6–3, 7–6^{(7–1)}
Men's doubles quarterfinals	(Australia) Max Purcell [WC] (Australia) Luke Saville [WC]	(Mexico) Santiago González (United Kingdom) Ken Skupski	6–2, 6–4
Matches on Margaret Court Arena
Event	Winner	Loser	Score
Men's Legends doubles Round Robin	(France) Mansour Bahrami (France) Fabrice Santoro	(Australia) Pat Cash (Australia) Mark Woodforde	4–3^{(5–2)}, 4–2
Women's doubles quarterfinals	(Czech Republic) Barbora Krejčíková [4] (Czech Republic) Kateřina Siniaková [4]	(Canada) Gabriela Dabrowski [6] (Latvia) Jeļena Ostapenko [6]	3–6, 6–2, 6–3
Men's doubles quarterfinals	(Croatia) Ivan Dodig [4] (Slovakia) Filip Polášek [4]	(El Salvador) Marcelo Arévalo (United Kingdom) Jonny O'Mara	6–3, 6–2
Mixed doubles 2nd round	(Czech Republic) Barbora Krejčíková [5] (Croatia) Nikola Mektić [5]	(United States) Amanda Anisimova [WC] (Australia) Nick Kyrgios [WC]	4–6, 6–4, [10–8]
Coloured background indicates a night match
Day matches began at 11 am, whilst night matches began at 7 pm AEDT

== Day 10 (29 January) ==
- Seeds out:
  - Men's singles: (Spain) Rafael Nadal [1], (Switzerland) Stan Wawrinka [15]
  - Women's singles: (Estonia) Anett Kontaveit [28], (Russia) Anastasia Pavlyuchenkova [30]
  - Women's doubles: (Czech Republic) Barbora Krejčíková / (Czech Republic) Kateřina Siniaková [4], (Chinese Taipei) Chan Hao-ching / (Chinese Taipei) Latisha Chan [7]
- Schedule of play

Matches on main courts
Matches on Rod Laver Arena
Event	Winner	Loser	Score
Women's singles quarterfinals	(Romania) Simona Halep [4]	(Estonia) Anett Kontaveit [28]	6–1, 6–1
Women's singles quarterfinals	(Spain) Garbiñe Muguruza	(Russia) Anastasia Pavlyuchenkova [30]	7–5, 6–3
Men's singles quarterfinals	(Germany) Alexander Zverev [7]	(Switzerland) Stan Wawrinka [15]	1–6, 6–3, 6–4, 6–2
Men's singles quarterfinals	(Austria) Dominic Thiem [5]	(Spain) Rafael Nadal [1]	7–6^{(7–3)}, 7–6^{(7–4)}, 4–6, 7–6^{(8–6)}
Mixed doubles quarterfinals	(Australia) Astra Sharma (Australia) John-Patrick Smith	(Poland) Iga Świątek (Poland) Łukasz Kubot	3–6, 7–6^{(7–4)}, [10–3]
Matches on Margaret Court Arena
Men's Legends doubles Round Robin	(France) Henri Leconte (Australia) Todd Woodbridge	(South Africa) Wayne Ferreira (Croatia) Goran Ivanišević	3–4^{(1–5)}, 4–1, 4–2
Mixed doubles quarterfinals	(United States) Bethanie Mattek-Sands (United Kingdom) Jamie Murray	(China) Zheng Saisai (Belgium) Joran Vliegen	6–3, 6–4
Women's doubles semifinals	(Chinese Taipei) Hsieh Su-wei [1] (Czech Republic) Barbora Strýcová [1]	(Czech Republic) Barbora Krejčíková [4] (Czech Republic) Kateřina Siniaková [4]	6–2, 6–3
Women's doubles semifinals	(Hungary) Tímea Babos [2] (France) Kristina Mladenovic [2]	(Chinese Taipei) Chan Hao-ching [7] (Chinese Taipei) Latisha Chan [7]	7–5, 6–2
Coloured background indicates a night match
Day matches began at 11 am, whilst night matches began at 7 pm AEDT

== Day 11 (30 January) ==
- Seeds out:
  - Men's singles: (Switzerland) Roger Federer [3]
  - Women's singles: (Australia) Ashleigh Barty [1], (Romania) Simona Halep [4]
  - Men's doubles: (Croatia) Ivan Dodig / (Slovakia) Filip Polášek [4]
  - Mixed doubles: (Chinese Taipei) Latisha Chan / (Croatia) Ivan Dodig [6]
- Schedule of play

Matches on main courts
Matches on Rod Laver Arena
Event	Winner	Loser	Score
Men's doubles semifinals	(Australia) Max Purcell [WC] (Australia) Luke Saville [WC]	(Croatia) Ivan Dodig [4] (Slovakia) Filip Polášek [4]	6–7^{(7–9)}, 6–3, 6–4
Women's singles semifinals	(United States) Sofia Kenin [14]	(Australia) Ashleigh Barty [1]	7–6^{(8–6)}, 7–5
Women's singles semifinals	(Spain) Garbiñe Muguruza	(Romania) Simona Halep [4]	7–6^{(10–8)}, 7–5
Men's singles semifinals	(Serbia) Novak Djokovic [2]	(Switzerland) Roger Federer [3]	7–6^{(7–1)}, 6–4, 6–3
Exhibition doubles	(Germany) Tommy Haas (Russia) Marat Safin	(Australia) Lleyton Hewitt (Croatia) Goran Ivanišević	3–4^{(3–5)}, 4–2, 4–2
Matches on Margaret Court Arena
Event	Winner	Loser	Score
Men's doubles semifinals	(United States) Rajeev Ram [11] (United Kingdom) Joe Salisbury [11]	(Kazakhstan) Alexander Bublik (Kazakhstan) Mikhail Kukushkin	4–6, 6–3, 6–4
Mixed doubles quarterfinals	(Czech Republic) Barbora Krejčíková [5] (Croatia) Nikola Mektić [5]	(Ukraine) Nadiia Kichenok (India) Rohan Bopanna	6–0, 6–2
Mixed doubles quarterfinals	(Canada) Gabriela Dabrowski [3] (Finland) Henri Kontinen [3]	(Chinese Taipei) Latisha Chan [6] (Croatia) Ivan Dodig [6]	7–5, 7–6^{(7–2)}
Wheelchair quad doubles final	(Australia) Dylan Alcott (Australia) Heath Davidson	(United Kingdom) Andy Lapthorne (United States) David Wagner	6–4, 6–3
Coloured background indicates a night match
Day matches began at 11 am, whilst night matches began at 7 pm AEDT

== Day 12 (31 January) ==
- Seeds out:
  - Men's singles: (Germany) Alexander Zverev [7]
  - Women's doubles: (Chinese Taipei) Hsieh Su-wei / (Czech Republic) Barbora Strýcová [1]
  - Mixed doubles: (Canada) Gabriela Dabrowski / (Finland) Henri Kontinen [3]
- Schedule of play

Matches on main courts
Matches on Rod Laver Arena
Event	Winner	Loser	Score
Mixed doubles semifinals	(Czech Republic) Barbora Krejčíková [5] (Croatia) Nikola Mektić [5]	(Canada) Gabriela Dabrowski [3] (Finland) Henri Kontinen [3]	3–6, 6–3, [10–5]
Mixed doubles semifinals	(United States) Bethanie Mattek-Sands (United Kingdom) Jamie Murray	(Australia) Astra Sharma (Australia) John-Patrick Smith [WC]	6–3, 7–6^{(7–4)}
Women's doubles final	(Hungary) Tímea Babos [2] (France) Kristina Mladenovic [2]	(Chinese Taipei) Hsieh Su-wei [1] (Czech Republic) Barbora Strýcová [1]	6–2, 6–1
Men's singles semifinals	(Austria) Dominic Thiem [5]	(Germany) Alexander Zverev [7]	3–6, 6–4, 7–6^{(7–3)}, 7–6^{(7–4)}
Day matches began at 1:30 pm on the court above and 3 pm on all other courts, whilst night matches began at 7:30 pm AEDT

== Day 13 (1 February) ==
- Schedule of play

Matches on main courts
Matches on Rod Laver Arena
Event	Winner	Loser	Score
Boys' singles final	(France) Harold Mayot [1]	(France) Arthur Cazaux [5]	6–4, 6–1
Girls' singles final	(Andorra) Victoria Jiménez Kasintseva [9]	(Poland) Weronika Baszak	5–7, 6–2, 6–2
Wheelchair quad singles final	(Australia) Dylan Alcott [1]	(United Kingdom) Andy Lapthorne [2]	6–0, 6–4
Women's singles final	(United States) Sofia Kenin [14]	(Spain) Garbiñe Muguruza	4–6, 6–2, 6–2
Mixed doubles final	(Czech Republic) Barbora Krejčíková [5] (Croatia) Nikola Mektić [5]	(United States) Bethanie Mattek-Sands (United Kingdom) Jamie Murray	5–7, 6–4, [10–1]
Day matches began at 11:15 am, whilst night matches began at 7:30 pm AEDT

== Day 14 (2 February) ==
- Seeds out:
  - Men's singles: (Austria) Dominic Thiem [5]
- Schedule of play

Matches on main courts
Matches on Rod Laver Arena
Event	Winner	Loser	Score
Men's doubles final	(United States) Rajeev Ram [11] (United Kingdom) Joe Salisbury [11]	(Australia) Max Purcell [WC] (Australia) Luke Saville [WC]	6–4, 6–2
Men's singles final	(Serbia) Novak Djokovic [2]	(Austria) Dominic Thiem [5]	6–4, 4–6, 2–6, 6–3, 6–4
Day matches began at 3:00 pm, whilst night matches began at 7:30 pm AEDT
