= Lego Masters (Australian TV series) =

Australian reality TV series

- Genre: Reality
- Presented by: Hamish Blake
- Judges: Ryan "The Brickman" McNaught
- Country of origin: Australia
- Original language: English
- No. of seasons: 8
- No. of episodes: 74

Production
- Production locations: Melbourne Showgrounds (2019‍–‍2021); Disney Studios, Sydney (2022‍–‍present)
- Running time: 90 mins (including ads)
- Production company: Endemol Shine Australia

Original release
- Network: Nine Network
- Release: 28 April 2019 – present

Lego Masters is an Australian reality television show based on the British series of the same name in which teams compete to build the best Lego project. It is hosted by Hamish Blake and judged by Lego designer Ryan "The Brickman" McNaught. The series premiered on 28 April 2019 on Nine Network.

The programme produced by Endemol Shine won a Realscreen award for Best Competition in 2020, beating out such game shows as Celebrity Family Feud, Hollywood Game Night and Deal or No Deal, and joining the Eureka Productions produced series Holey Moley as an Australian award-winning production in the US.

== Production ==
Auditions for the series opened in June 2018, although no network had commissioned it at that time. Filming would take place between October and December. The series was commissioned in July 2018 by the Nine Network, and was officially confirmed at Nine's Upfronts in October 2018, which also announced that the series would be hosted by Hamish Blake.

The first season was sponsored by Lego, Honda, Kmart and the a2 Milk Company.

Due to the success of the series, in May 2019 the series was renewed for a second season, which was filmed in 2019 and aired in 2020. On 16 October 2019, the second season was officially confirmed at Nine's upfronts. The second season began airing on 19 April 2020. It finished airing on 18 May 2020.

The second season was sponsored by Lego, Honda, Kmart and Wonder Bread.

Auditions for the third season opened in May 2020, asking for applicants 15 years old and above. In early September 2020, it was confirmed the third season would begin filming on Monday, 5 October at Melbourne Showgrounds. On 16 September 2020, the third season was officially confirmed at Nine's 2021 upfronts. The third season began airing on 19 April 2021.

In April 2021, Nine Network renewed the series for a fourth and fifth season, with Hamish Blake set to return as host for both. In August 2021, it was announced series production would be moved from Melbourne to Sydney due to Covid border restrictions. The fourth season began airing on 18 April 2022. The series was filmed at Fox Studios Sydney (now named Disney Studios Australia).

In September 2022, the series was renewed by Nine for a fifth season which is an “All-stars” season, titled Lego Masters: Grand Masters, which features returning contestants from each previous season. The contestants were announced 28 March 2023 and the season premiered on 10 April 2023.

In September 2023, the series was renewed by Nine for a sixth season, titled Lego Masters Australia vs The World, which features four new Australian teams and four teams who have previously competed in their homelands. The contestants were announced 5 April 2024 and the season premiered on 14 April 2024.

In October 2024, the series was renewed for a seventh season, which will see the return of past winners and finalists vs international teams who have previously competed in their homelands. In May 2025, season seven was confirmed to premiere on 1 June 2025 and will be titled Grandmasters of the Galaxy, and the contestants also announced.

In October 2025, the series was renewed for an eighth season however it will be a limited series, it will see the return of past contestants both of Australia and international teams that will be make four trio teams and will air over four episodes. The eighth season started airing on 5 July 2026 and it finished airing on 26 July 2026.

== Series overview ==
| Series | Episodes | Originally released | | Winning team | Prize |
| Series | Episodes | First released | Last released | Winning team | Prize |
|---|---|---|---|---|---|
| 1 | 9 | 28 April 2019 | 14 May 2019 | Henry & Cade | $100,000 |
| 2 | 11 | 19 April 2020 | 18 May 2020 | Jackson & Alex | $100,000 |
| 3 | 14 | 19 April 2021 | 17 May 2021 | David & Gus | $100,000 |
| 4 | 14 | 18 April 2022 | 16 May 2022 | Joss & Henry | $100,050 |
| 5 | 14 | 10 April 2023 | 8 May 2023 | Scott & Owen | $100,000 |
| 6 | 12 | 14 April 2024 | 7 May 2024 | Krystle & Michelle | $100,000 |
| 7 | 11 | 1 June 2025 | 23 June 2025 | Henry & Cade | $100,000 |
| 8 | 4 | 5 July 2026 | 26 July 2026 | Jackson, Alex & Fleur | $100,000 |

== Season details ==
=== Season 1 (2019) ===
The first season aired on 28 April 2019 and ended on 14 May 2019. The season was won by Henry and Cade, who received $100,000 in prize money.

| Team | Ages | Relationship | Status |
|---|---|---|---|
| Henry & Cade | 37 & 35 | "Team Dad" | Winners |
| David & G (Gerhard) | 33 & 52 | Workmates | Runners-up |
| Jordan & Miller | 19 & 20 | Childhood best mates | Third Place |
| Bilsy (Adam) & Kale | 34 & 41 | Lego Enthusiasts | Eliminated (Challenge 8) |
| Jimmy & Maddy | 36 & 29 | Married | Eliminated (Challenge 7) |
| Matt & Lyn | 17 & 71 | Grandson & Grandmother | Eliminated (Challenge 6) |
| Dinushi & Gayan | 34 & 36 | Friends | Eliminated (Challenge 4) |
| Marielle & Kaitlyn | 28 & 20 | Design Gurus | Eliminated (Challenge 3) |

=== Season 2 (2020) ===
The second season began airing on 19 April 2020 and ended on 18 May 2020. The season was won by Jackson and Alex, who received $100,000 in prize money.

| Team | Ages | Relationship/ Occupation^{1} | Status |
|---|---|---|---|
| Jackson & Alex | 29 & 29 | High School Friends | Winners |
| Damian & Andrew | 43 & 49 | Best Mates | Runners-up |
| Trent & Josh | 38 & 27 | Accountant & Primary School Chaplain | Third Place |
| Dannii & Tim | 26 & 25 | Married | Eliminated (Challenge 10) |
| Jennifer & Jodie | 31 & 38 | Researcher & Stay-at-home Mum | Eliminated (Challenge 9) |
| Jay & Stani | 42 & 41 | Childhood Best Friends | Eliminated (Challenge 6) |
| Summer & Iona | 19 & 18 | Childhood Best Friends | Eliminated (Challenge 4) |
| Annie & Runa | 30 & 29 | Lego Loving Friends | Eliminated (Challenge 3) |

=== Season 3 (2021) ===
The third season began airing on 19 April 2021 and ended on 17 May 2021. The season was won by David and Gus, who received $100,000 in prize money.

| Team | Ages | Relationship/ Occupation | Status |
|---|---|---|---|
| David & Gus | 41 & 36 | Project manager & engineer | Winners |
| Owen & Scott | 26 & 26 | Best Friends | Runners-up |
| Ryan & Gabby | 42 & 39 | Primary School teacher & occupational therapist | Eliminated (Challenge 7); Returned (Challenge 8); Third Place |
| Sarah & Fleur | 45 & 43 | Mums | Eliminated (Challenge 13) |
| Harrison & Michael | 26 & 25 | PhD candidate & physiotherapist | Eliminated (Challenge 12) |
| Anthony & Jess | 20 & 30 | Hotel concierge & science communicator | Eliminated (Challenge 6); Returned (Challenge 8); Eliminated (Challenge 10) |
| Amy & Dawei | 33 & 33 | Content creator & auditor/wedding photographer | Eliminated (Challenge 4 & 8) |
| Atlanta & Jeff | 25 & 28 | Luxury dice consultant & enthusiastic geek | Eliminated (Challenge 3 & 8) |

=== Season 4 (2022) ===
The fourth season began airing on 18 April 2022 and ended on 16 May 2022. The season was won by Joss and Henry, who received $100,000 (plus $50 donated by Hamish) in prize money.

| Team | Ages | Relationship/ Occupation | Status |
|---|---|---|---|
| Joss & Henry | 23 & 20 | Newy Brothers | Winners |
| Caleb & Alex | 21 & 25 | Law student & Makeup artist | Runners-up |
| Gene & Nick | 32 & 30 | Video editing best friends | Third Place |
| Rachael & Lexi | 37 & 33 | Auditor & Video Editor | Eliminated (Challenge 13) |
| Kirsti & Daniel | 44 & 42 | Support worker & Web developer | Eliminated (Challenge 12) |
| Paul & Trent | 50 & 45 | LEGO loving husbands | Eliminated (Challenge 10) |
| Branko & Max | 48 & 17 | Father & Son | Eliminated (Challenge 7) |
| Andrew & Crystal | 38 & 30 | Social media producer & Content creator | Eliminated (Challenge 4) |

=== Season 5 (2023) ===
The fifth season began airing on 10 April 2023 and ended on 8 May 2023. The season was won by Scott and Owen, who received $100,000 in prize money.

| Team | Relationship | Previous season | Status |
|---|---|---|---|
| Scott & Owen | Best friends | Season 3 runners-up | Winners |
| Joss & Henry Woodyard | Brothers | Season 4 winners | Runners up |
| Alex & Caleb Campion | Law student & Makeup artist | Season 4 runners-up | Third place |
| Ryan & Gabby | Primary School teacher & occupational therapist | Season 3 | Eliminated (Challenge 13) |
| Andrew & Damian | Best mates | Season 2 runners-up | Eliminated (Challenge 12) |
| David Velásquez & Gus McLaren | Mates | Season 3 winners | Eliminated (Challenge 10) |
| Henry & Sarah | Paired together | Season 1 winner & Season 3 | Eliminated (Challenge 7) |
| Kale & Trent | Paired together | Season 1 & Season 2 | Eliminated (Challenge 4) |

=== Season 6 (2024) ===
The sixth season began airing on 14 April 2024 and ended on 7 May 2024. The season was won by USA team Krystle & Michelle, who received $100,000 in prize money.

| Team | Ages | Relationship | Country/ Season | Status |
|---|---|---|---|---|
| Krystle & Michelle | 36 & 44 | Paired together | USA: Season 1 & Season 2 | Winners |
| Felix & Annalena | 21 & 27 | Fitness fanatic friends | Germany: Season 1 Winners | Runners up |
| Dianne & Shane | 59 & 38 | Mother & Son | Australia | Third place |
| Ben & Eric | 24 & 21 | Friends | Australia | Eliminated (Challenge 11) |
| Peter & Ida | 41 & 33 | Friends | Denmark: Season 2 runners-up | Eliminated (Challenge 10) |
| Charlie & Haley | 19 & 25 | Paired together | Australia | Eliminated (Challenge 7) |
| Camille & Caroline | 34 & 22 | Siblings | France: Season 3 finalists | Eliminated (Challenge 4) |
| Sam & Emilio | Both 38 | Brick Artist & Visual Merchandiser | Australia | Eliminated (Challenge 3) |

=== Season 7 (2025) ===
The seventh season began airing on 1 June 2025. The season was won by Australian team Henry & Cade, Who received $100,000 in prize money.

| Team | Ages | Relationship | Country | Season | Status |
|---|---|---|---|---|---|
| Henry & Cade | 43 & 42 | Best mates | Australia | Season 1 winners | Winners |
| Trent & Alex | 43 & 28 | Paired together | Australia | Seasons 2 & 5 and Seasons 4 & 5 | Runners up |
| Vidar & Albin | 25 & 23 | Paired together | Sweden | Seasons 2 winner & contestant | Third place |
| Dai & Jiayuan | 35 & 34 | Dynamic duo | China | Season 2 runners-up | Eliminated (Semi-final) |
| Oskari & Aura | 23 & 31 | Quirky pair | Finland | Season 2 winners | Eliminated (Challenge 9) |
| David & G (Gerhard) | 39 & 59 | Former workmates | Australia | Season 1 runners-up | Eliminated (Challenge 8) |
| Nick & Stacey | 32 & 37 | Friends | Canada | Season 3 winners | Eliminated (Challenge 7) |
| Gabby & Owen | 43 & 31 | Paired together | Australia | Seasons 3 & 5 | Eliminated (Challenge 6) |
| Emily & Sarah | 44 & 43 | Team mum | New Zealand | Season 1 runners-up | Eliminated (Challenge 5) |
| Paul & Nealita | 34 & 26 | Siblings | US | Season 4 third place | Eliminated (Challenge 4) |

=== Season 8 (2026) ===
The eighth season began airing on 5 July 2026. The season was won by Australian team Jackson, Alex T & Fleur, Who received $100,000 in prize money.

| Team | Season Appearances | Country | Status |
|---|---|---|---|
| Jackson, Alex T & Fleur | 2 • 2 • 3 | Australia | Winner |
| Gabby, Oskari & Aura | 3,5,7 • 7 • 7 | Australia & Finland | Runner-up |
| Trent, Alex G & Felix | 2,5,7 • 4,5,7 • 6 | Australia & Germany | Third |
| Jordy (Jordan), Michelle & Max | 1 • 6 • 4 | Australia & USA | Eliminated |

== Viewership ==
| Season | Episodes | Premiere | | | Finale | | | | | Series average | Source |
| Season | Episodes | Premiere date | Premiere ratings | Rank | Finale date | Finale ratings (Grand final) | Rank | Finale ratings (Winner announced) | Rank | Series average | Source |
|---|---|---|---|---|---|---|---|---|---|---|---|
| 1 | 9 | 28 April 2019 | 1.377 | #1 | 14 May 2019 | 1.249 | #2 | 1.493 | #1 | 1.157 | |
| 2 | 11 | 19 April 2020 | 1.239 | #2 | 18 May 2020 | 1.219 | #3 | 1.462 | #1 | 1.185 | |
| 3 | 14 | 19 April 2021 | 0.838 | #5 | 17 May 2021 | 0.932 | #6 | 1.030 | #2 | 0.794 | |
| 4 | 14 | 18 April 2022 | 0.672 | #6 | 16 May 2022 | 0.669 | #8 | 0.702 | #6 | 0.614 | |
| 5 | 14 | 10 April 2023 | 0.502 | #8 | 8 May 2023 | 0.576 | #10 | 0.598 | #7 | 0.500 | |
| 6^{[a]} | 12 | 14 April 2024 | 0.874 | #3 | 7 May 2024 | 0.848 | #3 | —N/a | | 0.765 | |
| 7^{[a]} | 10 | 1 June 2025 | 0.873 | #2 | 23 June 2025 | 0.850 | #3 | —N/a | | 0.877 | |

- ^{a} From 28 January 2024, OzTAM ratings changed. Viewership data now focus on National Reach and National Total ratings instead of the 5 metro centres and overnight shares.

== Awards and nominations ==
| Year | Award | Category | Nominee | Result |
|---|---|---|---|---|
| 2019 | AACTA Awards | Best Entertainment Program | Lego Masters | Won |
| 2019 | Asian Academy Creative Awards | Best Adaptation of an Existing Format | Lego Masters | Nominated |
| 2020 | Realscreen Awards | Best Competition: Quiz or Game Show | Lego Masters | Won |
| 2020 | AACTA Awards | Best Entertainment Program | Lego Masters | Nominated |
| 2022 | Logie Awards | Most Outstanding Entertainment or Comedy Program | Lego Masters | Won |
| 2022 | Logie Awards | Gold Logie Award for Most Popular Personality on Australian Television | Hamish Blake | Won |
| 2022 | Logie Awards | Bert Newton Award for Most Popular Presenter | Hamish Blake | Won |
| 2022 | AACTA Awards | Best Entertainment Program | Lego Masters | Won |
| 2023 | Logie Awards | Most Outstanding Entertainment or Comedy Program | Lego Masters | Nominated |
| 2023 | Logie Awards | Gold Logie Award for Most Popular Personality on Australian Television | Hamish Blake | Nominated |
| 2023 | Logie Awards | Bert Newton Award for Most Popular Presenter | Hamish Blake | Nominated |
| 2025 | Logie Awards | Best Competition Reality Program | Lego Masters | Nominated |

== Christmas specials ==
During Nine's 2022 upfronts, it was announced that a two-part Christmas special would air in the fourth quarter of 2021. The series would have celebrities team up with contestants from the past seasons to create new Christmas themed builds, and the celebrities would include Scott Cam, Sophie Monk, Brooke Boney and Michael “Wippa” Wipfli. The special aired on 21 and 28 November 2021.

During Nine's 2023 upfronts, it was announced that a second two-part Christmas special would air in the fourth quarter of 2022, and that the celebrities would include Poh Ling Yeow, Emma Watkins, Darren Palmer and Lincoln Lewis. The second special aired on 20 and 27 November 2022.

== Notes ==
- *^1 Not all teams in the season have an existing relationship (e.g. family or friend); some were paired together during the application process due to single applications.
