= Lego Masters (Australian TV series) season 2 =

Lego Masters
- Season 2
- Hosted by: Hamish Blake
- Judges: Ryan "The Brickman" McNaught
- No. of teams: 8
- Winners: Jackson & Alex
- Runners-up: Andrew & Damian
- Location: Melbourne, Australia
- No. of episodes: 11

Release
- Original network: Nine Network
- Original release: 19 April – 18 May 2020

Season chronology
- ← Previous; Season 1 Next → Season 3

The second season of Australian reality television series Lego Masters premiered on the Nine Network on 19 April 2020. Hamish Blake returned as host along with Ryan "The Brickman" McNaught as Judge.

== Production ==
Due to the success of the series, In May 2019 the series was renewed for a second season which will film later in 2019 set to air in 2020. On 16 October 2019, the second season was officially confirmed at Nine's upfronts.

The second season is sponsored by Lego, Honda, Kmart and Wonder Bread.

== Teams ==
Team	Ages	Relationship/ Occupation^{1}	Status
Jackson & Alex	29 & 29	High School Friends	Winners
Damian & Andrew	43 & 49	Best Mates	Runners up
Trent & Josh	38 & 27	Accountant & Primary School Chaplain	Eliminated (Challenge 11)
Dannii & Tim	26 & 25	Married	Eliminated (Challenge 10)
Jennifer & Jodie	31 & 38	Researcher & Stay-at-home Mum	Eliminated (Challenge 9)
Jay & Stani	42 & 41	Childhood Best Friends	Eliminated (Challenge 6)
Summer & Iona	19 & 18	Childhood Best Friends	Eliminated (Challenge 4)
Annie & Runa	30 & 29	Lego Loving Friends	Eliminated (Challenge 3)

Notes

*^1 Not all teams in the season have a relation (i.e. family or friend), some were paired together during the application process due to single applications.

== Elimination history ==
Teams' progress through the competition
Team	Challenge										
Team	1	2	3	4	5	6	7	8	9	10	GF
Jackson & Alex	Safe	Second Place	First Place	Safe	Tied Second Place	Second Place	First Place	Second Place	Second Place	Safe	Winners
Damian & Andrew	Advantage	Safe	Second Place	Safe	Tied Second Place	Safe	Safe	First Place	Immunity	Safe	Runners-up
Trent & Josh	Safe	Safe	Sixth Place	First Place	Safe	First Place	Second Place	Safe	First Place	Safe	Eliminated
Dannii & Tim	Safe	Safe	Safe	Safe	First Place	Immunity	Safe	Safe	Third Place	Eliminated	
Jennifer & Jodie	Safe	Safe	Safe	Safe	Safe	Fourth Place	Safe	Safe	Eliminated		
Jay & Stani	Second Place	Safe	Safe	Advantage	Safe	Eliminated					
Summer & Iona	Safe	First Place	Immunity	Eliminated							
Annie & Runa	Safe	Safe	Eliminated								

Table key
Advantage	Team received an advantage from Brickman
First Place	Team came 1st place in the challenge or the show
Immunity	Team is immune and safe from elimination
Second-Seventh Place	Team came in 2nd-7th place, in the top two or bottom two chosen by Brickman
Safe	Team was safe from elimination after passing a challenge/round.
Eliminated	Team was eliminated from the competition

== Series Details ==
=== Challenge 1 ===
- Airdate - 19 April 2020
- Challenge: "A Whole New World" - Each of the eight teams were tasked with creating a Lego world of their choice in 15 hours, they were then given an additional 2 hours to build a gift from their world to the world on their right, built on a barge.
- Advantage - The winner of the challenge received "The Golden Brick", which they can use to keep them safe from a future Elimination Challenge. They also received "The Flash Jordan Brick", which allows a team to have Season 1 contestant Jordan be their Brick Pit runner for an entire future build.

Team	Lego Design	Result
Damian & Andrew	Isle of Eyes Cave	Advantage
Summer & Iona	Dream Home	Safe
Trent & Josh	NEWtopia Space World	Safe
Jackson & Alex	Steampunk Power Station	Safe
Jay & Stani	Space Tourist World	Safe
Jennifer & Jodie	Underwater World	Safe
Dannii & Tim	Wizard Tower	Safe
Annie & Runa	Turtle Island	Safe

=== Challenge 2 ===
- Airdate - 20 April 2020
- Challenge: "Hero Shot" - Each of the eight teams had 10 hours with choosing a mini figure and making a design which would be exploded similar to what you would see in an action movie as the hero struts away as an explosion goes off in the background. The winner of the challenge received immunity from the next Elimination Challenge.

Team	Lego Design	Result
Summer & Iona	Element: Water; Minifigure: Samurai; Build: Secret Lair Council	Challenge Winners
Damian & Andrew	Element: Glitter; Minifigure: Female Knight; Build: Fairy Queen's Castle	Safe
Trent & Josh	Element: Slime; Minifigure: Space Lady; Build: 80's Alien Action Film	Safe
Jackson & Alex	Element: Chalk; Minifigure: Bandido; Build: Wild West Heist	Safe
Jay & Stani	Element: Chalk; Minifigure: Viking Warrior Lady; Build: Viking Fort	Safe
Jennifer & Jodie	Element: Water; Minifigure: Secret Agent; Build: Secret Agent's Escape	Safe
Dannii & Tim	Element: Slime; Minifigure: Retro Spaceman; Build: Space Alien Eradication	Safe
Annie & Runa	Element: Glitter; Minifigure: Heroic Knight; Build: Dragon's Lair	Safe

=== Challenge 3 ===
- Airdate - 21 April 2020
- Challenge: "Fairytale" - Each team had 12 hours to create a design based on famous fairytales, each design is based on a certain part in the fairytale. The team with the weakest design was eliminated.

Team	Lego Design	Result
Summer & Iona	N/A	Immunity
Jackson & Alex	Hansel and Gretel - Witch's House	Challenge Winners
Damian & Andrew	Jack and the Beanstalk - Giant coming down the beanstalk	Safe
Trent & Josh	Cinderella - Cinderella at the ball	Safe
Jay & Stani	Rapunzel - Rapunzel releasing her hair down the tower	Safe
Jennifer & Jodie	The Ugly Duckling - Ugly Duckling being left out of the group	Safe
Dannii & Tim	Jack and the Beanstalk - Jack in the Giant's house	Safe
Annie & Runa	The Little Mermaid - Ariel meeting the prince	Eliminated

=== Challenge 4 ===
- Airdate - 26 April 2020
- Advantage Challenge: "Tall Tower" - Team were given 2 hours to build the tallest structure they possibly can only using 2x4, 2x6 & 2x8 bricks, however they cannot use a stool for more height. The team with the tallest structure wins an advantage of an extra hour in the Elimination Challenge.
- Elimination Challenge: "One Hanging Brick" - Teams were given 10 hours to create a design built off a technic beam hanging above their desks. The team with the weakest design was eliminated.

Team	Lego Design	Result
Advantage Challenge - “Tall Tower”
Jay & Stani	Pillar and Cross-Brace Tower	Advantage
Summer & Iona	Regular Lego Tower	Through to Elimination Challenge
Jackson & Alex	Tower of Mini Towers Tower	Through to Elimination Challenge
Damian & Andrew	“Tree” of Sideways Brick Tower	Through to Elimination Challenge
Trent & Josh	Regular Lego Tower	Through to Elimination Challenge
Jennifer & Jodie	Regular Lego Tower	Through to Elimination Challenge
Dannii & Tim	Regular Lego Tower	Through to Elimination Challenge
Elimination Challenge - “One Hanging Brick”
Trent & Josh	Cats vs Bird Cage	Challenge Winners
Jackson & Alex	UFO Barn Abduction	Safe
Damian & Andrew	Pirate Air Ship	Safe
Jay & Stani	Micro-Scale City	Safe
Jennifer & Jodie	Cloud Battle Royale	Safe
Dannii & Tim	Giant Anglerfish	Safe
Summer & Iona	Piñata	Eliminated

=== Challenge 5 ===
- Airdate - 27 April 2020
- Challenge: "Make & Shake" - Teams were given 8 hours to build a 1.2m tall 32×32 tower, which will then be subjected to varying levels 1-10 of shaking on a shake plate. The team with best design won immunity for the next Elimination Challenge.

Team	Lego Design	Result
Dannii & Tim	Tower: Popcorn Box; Shake Level Reached: 10	Challenge Winners
Jay & Stani	Tower: Shock Absorbers; Shake Level Reached: 6	Safe
Jackson & Alex	Tower: Prison; Shake Level Reached: 10	Safe
Damian & Andrew	Tower: Wizard Castle; Shake Level Reached: 10	Safe
Trent & Josh	Tower: Technic; Shake Level Reached: 7	Safe
Jennifer & Jodie	Tower: Pop Art; Shake Level Reached: 6	Safe

=== Challenge 6 ===
- Airdate - 3 May 2020
- Challenge: "3D Art" - The teams are given 12 hours to create a 3D Art design inside a deep frame. The team with weakest design will be eliminated.

Team	Lego Design	Result
Dannii & Tim	N/A	Immunity
Trent & Josh	Cowboy riding a bucking bull	Challenge Winners
Jackson & Alex	Venus Flytrap	Safe
Damian & Andrew	MUNCH 3D movie poster	Safe
Jennifer & Jodie	Octopus attacking a pirate ship	Safe
Jay & Stani	New York Love Scene	Eliminated

=== Challenge 7 ===
- Airdate - 4 May 2020
- Challenge: "Above & Below" - Teams were given 12 hours to build a design on a large baseplate fixed to the top and also the bottom of their construction table. The team with the worst design will go to the Elimination Challenge.
- Elimination Challenge: "Retro Rebuild" - The losing team from the first challenge will compete against eliminated team Jay & Stani, they were given 3 hours to create a retro item in 1:1 scale. The team who wins regains a place in the competition.

Team	Lego Design	Result
Challenge - “Above & Below”
Jackson & Alex	1950s Worm Attack	Challenge Winners
Dannii & Tim	Prehistoric Excavation	Safe
Damian & Andrew	Fake Shark Attack	Safe
Trent & Josh	Farmer Vs Rabbit	Safe
Jennifer & Jodie	Santa's Workshop	Through to Elimination Challenge
Elimination Challenge - “Retro Rebuild”
Jennifer & Jodie	Polaroid Camera	Won
Jay & Stani	Game Boy	Lost

Note: Damian & Andrew deployed the "Flash Jordan" brick that they won in the first episode, and Season 1 contestant Jordan collected materials from the Brick Pit for the team during the Above & Below challenge.

=== Challenge 8 ===
- Airdate - 10 May 2020
- Challenge: "Star Wars" - The teams were given 8 hours to create a new Star Wars vehicle, they must also pick a minifigure from a tub that gives them their side – two teams will do Dark Side builds, two Light Side builds and one grey build e.g. bounty hunters. The team with the best design received immunity from the next Elimination Challenge and advanced to finals week.

Team	Lego Design	Result
Damian & Andrew	Grey Side: Bounty Hunter Ship	Challenge Winners
Jackson & Alex	Dark Side: The Imperial Tempest Dropship	Safe
Dannii & Tim	Dark Side: The Imperial Blade	Safe
Trent & Josh	Light Side: Heavy Assault Starship	Safe
Jennifer & Jodie	Light Side: The Reyvenger	Safe

=== Challenge 9 ===
- Airdate - 11 May 2020
- Challenge: "Underwater" - The teams were given 12 hours to build an underwater themed design that will actually be submerged underwater, the design will be placed on a weighted platform covered in baseplates. The team with the weakest design will be eliminated.

Team	Lego Design	Result
Damian & Andrew	N/A	Immunity
Trent & Josh	Diver Fights Sea Creature	Challenge Winners
Jackson & Alex	Crablantis	Safe
Dannii & Tim	Diver Fights Octopus	Safe
Jennifer & Jodie	Mermaid	Eliminated

=== Challenge 10 ===
- Airdate - 17 May 2020
- Advantage Challenge: "Smash & Grab" - The teams were given 4 hours to create a design with only the amount of LEGO pieces they can grab from the floor within 5 minutes. The team with the best design will win the advantage of choosing their build in the Elimination Challenge.
- Elimination Challenge: "Night & Day" - The teams were given 12 hours to create a design based on 1 of 4 vacant blocks: residential, commercial, industrial and shared space, which must look amazing during the day and at night. The team with the weakest design will be eliminated.

Team	Lego Design	Result
Advantage Challenge - "Smash & Grab"
Trent & Josh	Egg Thief	Advantage
Damian & Andrew	Mayan Temple	Through to Elimination Challenge
Jackson & Alex	Retro Video Game	Through to Elimination Challenge
Dannii & Tim	Phoenix	Through to Elimination Challenge
Elimination Challenge - "Night & Day"
Damian & Andrew	Shared Space: Museum Heist	Safe
Jackson & Alex	Commercial: Evil Mega Corporation	Safe
Trent & Josh	Residential: Haunted House for Sale	Safe
Dannii & Tim	Industrial: UFO Warehouse	Eliminated

=== Grand Final ===
- Airdate - 18 May 2020
- Grand Final Challenge - Over 28 hours, remaining contestants were tasked with building something of their own choice; yet still needing to adhere to the criteria of technical skills, story-telling elements and overall aesthetic. The Team with the most votes would win the competition and receive $100,000 AUD.
- Voting & Judgment - The 250 members of the public, as well as past contestants, would judge the builds, assigning their Black Bricks (worth 1 vote) to whichever model they liked most. Completing the vote, Brickman was given a Golden Brick worth 100 votes.

Team	Lego Design	Result
Jackson & Alex	Mad Scientist's Frankenfig	Winners
Damian & Andrew	Mech arena	Runners up
Trent & Josh	Pirate ship	Eliminated

== Ratings ==
No.	Title	Air date	Timeslot	Overnight ratings		Consolidated ratings		Total viewers	Ref(s)
No.	Title	Air date	Timeslot	Viewers	Rank	Viewers	Rank	Total viewers	Ref(s)
1	Challenge 1	19 April 2020	Sunday 7:00pm	1,239,000	2	152,000	1	1,391,000	
2	Challenge 2	20 April 2020	Monday 7:30pm	1,049,000	5	163,000	2	1,212,000	
3	Challenge 3	21 April 2020	Tuesday 7:30pm	1,035,000	5	144,000	2	1,179,000	
4	Challenge 4	26 April 2020	Sunday 7:00pm	1,171,000	2	140,000	1	1,311,000	
5	Challenge 5	27 April 2020	Monday 7:30pm	1,097,000	4	151,000	2	1,248,000	
6	Challenge 6	3 May 2020	Sunday 7:00pm	1,206,000	2	114,000	1	1,320,000	
7	Challenge 7	4 May 2020	Monday 7:30pm	1,089,000	4	174,000	3	1,263,000	
8	Challenge 8	10 May 2020	Sunday 7:00pm	1,202,000	2	110,000	1	1,312,000	
9	Challenge 9	11 May 2020	Monday 7:30pm	1,238,000	2	149,000	1	1,387,000	
10	Challenge 10	17 May 2020	Sunday 7:00pm	1,217,000	2	137,000	1	1,354,000	
11	Grand Final Winners Announced	18 May 2020	Monday 7:30pm Monday 9:00pm	1,219,000 1,462,000	3 1	167,000 168,000	2 1	1,386,000 1,630,000	
