= Lego Masters (Australian TV series) season 1 =

Lego Masters
- Season 1
- Hosted by: Hamish Blake
- Judges: Ryan "The Brickman" McNaught
- No. of teams: 8
- Winners: Henry & Cade
- Runners-up: David & Gerhard
- Location: Melbourne, Australia
- No. of episodes: 9

Release
- Original network: Nine Network
- Original release: 28 April – 14 May 2019

Season chronology
- Next → Season 2

The first season of Australian reality television series Lego Masters premiered on the Nine Network on 28 April 2019. Hamish Blake was announced as host and Ryan "The Brickman" McNaught was announced as Judge.

== Production ==
Auditions for the series opened in June 2018, however no network had commissioned it at that time, filming would take place between October and December. The series was commissioned in July 2018 by the Nine Network, The series was officially confirmed at Nine's Upfronts in October 2018, also announcing the series will be hosted Hamish Blake.

The season was sponsored by Lego, Honda, Kmart and the a2 Milk Company.

== Teams ==
| Team | Ages | Relationship | Status |
|---|---|---|---|
| Henry & Cade | 37 & 35 | "Team Dad" | Winners |
| David & G (Gerhard) | 32 & 52 | Workmates | Runners-up |
| Jordan & Miller | 19 & 19 | Childhood Best Friends | Runners-up |
| Bilsy (Adam) & Kale | 34 & 41 | Lego Enthusiasts | Eliminated (Challenge 8) |
| Jimmy & Maddy | 36 & 29 | Married | Eliminated (Challenge 7) |
| Matt & Lyn | 17 & 71 | Grandson & Grandmother | Eliminated (Challenge 6) |
| Dinushi & Gayan | 34 & 36 | Best friends | Eliminated (Challenge 4) |
| Marielle & Kaitlyn | 28 & 20 | Design Gurus | Eliminated (Challenge 3) |

== Elimination history ==
Teams' progress through the competition
| Team | Challenge | | | | | | | | |
| Team | 1 | 2 | 3 | 4 | 5 | 6 | 7 | 8 | GF |
|---|---|---|---|---|---|---|---|---|---|
| Henry & Cade | Second Place | Second Place | First Place | Second Place | Safe | First Place | Immunity | Tied First Place | Winners |
| David & G | Safe | Safe | Second Place | Safe | First Place | Immunity | Second Place | Tied First Place | Runners-Up |
| Jordan & Miller | Safe | Safe | Safe | Safe | Second Place | Fourth Place | First Place | Third Place | Runners-Up |
| Bilsy (Adam) & Kale | Safe | Safe | Safe | Fifth Place | Safe | Safe | Third Place | Eliminated | |
| Jimmy & Maddy | Safe | Safe | Tied Sixth Place | First Place | Safe | Safe | Eliminated | | |
| Matt & Lyn | First Place | Safe | Tied Sixth Place | Immunity^{1} | Safe | Eliminated | | | |
| Dinushi & Gayan | Safe | First Place | Immunity | Eliminated | | | | | |
| Marielle & Kaitlyn | Safe | Safe | Eliminated | | | | | | |

Table key
| Immunity | Team is immune and safe from elimination |
| First Place | Team came 1st place in the challenge |
| Second-Seventh Place | Team came 2nd-7th place in the top two or the bottom two chosen by Brickman |
| Safe | Team was safe from elimination after passing a challenge/round |
| Eliminated | Team was eliminated from the competition |

Notes

*^1 Matt and Lynn played the golden brick that they won in episode 1. Therefore, they were safe from elimination.

== Series Details ==
=== Challenge 1 ===
- Airdate - 28 April 2019
- Challenge: "Mega Cities" - Each of the eight teams had to create a city block (to connect to an already built city) in 15 hours, then they were tasked with an additional 3 hours to show their building under attack.
- Advantage - The winner of the challenge received "The Golden Brick", which they can use to keep them safe from a future Elimination Challenge.

| Team | Lego Design | Result |
|---|---|---|
| Matt & Lyn | Blue Building - Under Attack by Dragon | Advantage |
| Jimmy & Maddy | Megatown under Attack - City Defended by large Lego Maddy^{2} | Safe |
| David & G | Cathedral - Under Attack by Bombing | Safe |
| Henry & Cade | Peter-Pan Modernised Treehouse - Under Attack by Captain Hook and his crew | Safe |
| Jordan & Miller | A "Journey Through Time" Town Hall - Under Attack by UFO | Safe |
| Bilsy (Adam) & Kale | Tall Urban Building - Under Attack by Aliens | Safe |
| Marielle & Kaitlyn | Art Gallery - Under Attack by Agents of Darkness | Safe |
| Dinushi & Gayan | "Life After Work" City - Under attack by Asteroids | Safe |

Notes

*^2 As Jimmy & Maddy's design was already under attack, they were tasked to make the city's defence.

=== Challenge 2 ===
- Airdate - 29 April 2019
- Challenge: "Blockbuster" - Each of the eight teams had 7 hours to create a space themed design, after which would be destroyed in 1 of 4 types of ways. The challenge winner received immunity.

| Team | Lego Design | Result |
|---|---|---|
| Dinushi & Gayan | Space Colony Destruction - Explosives | Challenge Winners |
| Jimmy & Maddy | Honeymoon Rocket - 4 Metre Moon Drop | Safe |
| David & G | Space Station - Baseball Bat | Safe |
| Henry & Cade | Giant Purple Alien - Baseball Bat | Safe |
| Jordan & Miller | Space-Themed Noah's Ark - 100 km/h track | Safe |
| Bilsy (Adam) & Kale | Space Hotel - 4 Metre Moon Drop | Safe |
| Marielle & Kaitlyn | Moon Mine - Explosives | Safe |
| Matt & Lyn | Solar System - 100 km/h track | Safe |

=== Challenge 3 ===
- Airdate - 30 April 2019
- Challenge: "Cut in Half" - Each of the teams had 10 hours to build a second half of an object that had been cut in half. The team with the weakest design was eliminated.

| Team | Lego Design | Result |
|---|---|---|
| Dinushi & Gayan | N/A | Immunity |
| Henry & Cade | Original Half: Violin; Designed Half: Cyberpunk Lady Playing Violin | Challenge Winners |
| Jimmy & Maddy | Original Half: Mannequin; Designed Half: Imaginative Lego Mannequin | Safe |
| David & G | Original Half: Projector; Designed Half: WWII Dogfight | Safe |
| Jordan & Miller | Original Half: Typewriter; Designed Half: Fairy-tale Book | Safe |
| Bilsy (Adam) & Kale | Original Half: Rear Half of Bicycle; Designed Half: Unicorn Bike | Safe |
| Matt & Lyn | Original Half: Blender; Designed Half: Kitchen Catastrophe | Safe |
| Marielle & Kaitlyn | Original Half: TV; Designed Half: Underwater Discarded TV | Eliminated |

=== Challenge 4 ===
- Airdate - 5 May 2019
- Advantage Challenge: "Break and Make" - Teams were given 4 hours to take a pre-constructed parrot apart and build something new with all 1,600 pieces. The winner of the challenge received an advantage of an extra hour for the elimination challenge.
- Elimination Challenge: "Apartment" - The Teams were given 11 hours to create an apartment complex with three flights of floors. The team with the weakest design was eliminated.

| Team | Lego Design | Result |
Advantage Challenge - "Break and Make"
| Bilsy (Adam) & Kale | Band Playing on Stage | Advantage |
| Matt & Lyn | Robot Fighting a Kangaroo | Through to Elimination Challenge |
| Dinushi & Gayan | Theme Park | Through to Elimination Challenge |
| Jimmy & Maddy | Motorbike Rider at Duck Crossing | Through to Elimination Challenge |
| David & G | Engagement in a Park | Through to Elimination Challenge |
| Henry & Cade | Boxing Match Video Game | Through to Elimination Challenge |
| Jordan & Miller | Pirate Ship | Through to Elimination Challenge |
Elimination Challenge - "Apartment"
| Matt & Lyn | N/A | Immunity |
| Jimmy & Maddy | Haunted House | Challenge Winners |
| David & G | Honeymoon Apartment | Safe |
| Henry & Cade | Space Station Themed Apartment | Safe |
| Jordan & Miller | Fraternity House Party | Safe |
| Bilsy (Adam) & Kale | Childhood Dream Apartment | Safe |
| Dinushi & Gayan | Diner/Domestic Apartment | Eliminated |

=== Challenge 5 ===
- Airdate - 6 May 2019
- Challenge: "Bridge" - Teams had 10 hours to build a 2-metre Lego bridge that could support itself and additional weights of 8 kg; tiebreaker winners would be determined by aesthetic. The winners won advantage of immunity from the next elimination challenge.

| Team | Lego Design | Result |
|---|---|---|
| David & G | Bridge weight before breaking: 88 kg | Advantage |
| Matt & Lyn | Bridge weight before breaking: 34 kg | Safe |
| Jimmy & Maddy | Bridge weight before breaking: 34 kg | Safe |
| Henry & Cade | Bridge weight before breaking: 58 kg | Safe |
| Jordan & Miller | Bridge weight before breaking: 88 kg | Safe |
| Bilsy (Adam) & Kale | Bridge weight before breaking: 24 kg | Safe |

=== Challenge 6 ===
- Airdate - 7 May 2019
- Challenge: "Evil Lair" - The teams had 13 hours to build an Evil Villain's Lair, complete with a getaway vehicle and a lair containing booby traps, an escape path and a "Mega Weapon". The team with the weakest design was eliminated.

| Team | Lego Design | Result |
|---|---|---|
| David & G | N/A | Immunity |
| Henry & Cade | Evil Bee Girl Lair | Challenge Winners |
| Jimmy & Maddy | Evil Cactus Girl Lair | Safe |
| Jordan & Miller | Evil Genie Lair | Safe |
| Bilsy (Adam) & Kale | Evil Robot Lair | Safe |
| Matt & Lyn | Evil Leprechaun Lair | Eliminated |

=== Challenge 7 ===
- Airdate - 12 May 2019
- Advantage Challenge: "Delorean" - The teams had to build an exact replica of The DeLorean from Back to the Future, with the team who designed it the most accurately winning immunity from the Elimination Challenge.
- Elimination Challenge: "Classic Movie Scene" - Contestants had 10 hours to create an iconic scene from a movie of their choice. The team with the weakest design would be eliminated.

| Team | Lego Design | Result |
Advantage Challenge - “Delorean”
| Henry & Cade | Lego Design of the Delorean from Back to the Future | Advantage |
| David & G | Lego Design of the Delorean from Back to the Future | Through to Elimination Challenge |
| Jimmy & Maddy | Lego Design of the Delorean from Back to the Future | Through to Elimination Challenge |
| Jordan & Miller | Lego Design of the Delorean from Back to the Future | Through to Elimination Challenge |
| Bilsy (Adam) & Kale | Lego Design of the Delorean from Back to the Future | Through to Elimination Challenge |
Elimination Challenge - “Classic Movie Scene”
| Henry & Cade | N/A | Immunity |
| Jordan & Miller | Movie: King Kong; Scene: Climbing the Empire State Building | Challenge Winners |
| David & G | Movie: Jaws; Scene: Attacking the Boat | Safe |
| Bilsy (Adam) & Kale | Movie: Titanic; Scene: Rose & Jack's "I'm Flying" Scene | Safe |
| Jimmy & Maddy | Movie: The Exorcist; Scene: Head Spinning Scene | Eliminated |

=== Challenge 8 ===
- Airdate - 13 May 2019
- Challenge: "Time Train" - The four remaining teams had 16 hours to build a world based on four different eras – The Future, Prehistoric, Medieval, the Wild West, as a train travelled effortlessly through each of the builds. Kale and Bilsy were eliminated due to their T-Rex being too big.

| Team | Lego Design | Result |
|---|---|---|
| David & G | Future Time Train | Through to Grand Final |
| Henry & Cade | Wild West Time Train | Through to Grand Final |
| Jordan & Miller | Medieval Time Train | Through to Grand Final |
| Bilsy (Adam) & Kale | Prehistoric Time Train | Eliminated |

=== Grand Final ===
- Airdate - 14 May 2019
- Grand Final Challenge - Over 28 hours, remaining contestants were tasked with building something of their own choice; yet still needing to adhere to the criteria of technical skills, story-telling elements and overall aesthetic. The Team with the most votes would win the competition and receive $100,000 AUD.
- Voting & Judgment - Assisting Brickman in judging was Senior Design Manager at LEGO, Fenella Charity. The 250 members of the public, as well as past contestants, were also going to be judging, assigning their Black Bricks (worth 1 vote) to whichever model they liked most. Completing the vote, Brickman and Fenella were each given a Golden Brick worth 50 votes.

| Team | Lego Design | Result |
|---|---|---|
| Henry & Cade | Poseidon Themed Build - Poseidon protecting a boat full of warriors from being attacked by a serpent | Winners |
| David & G | Theme Park Build - attractions include Rollercoaster, Ferris Wheel, Big Drop & Go Kart Track | Runners-up |
| Jordan & Miller | Spaceship Themed Build - Mothership being robbed by Space Pirates while space crew fight with to protect | Runners-up |

== Ratings ==
| No. | Title | Air date | Timeslot | Overnight ratings | | Consolidated ratings | | Total viewers | Ref(s) |
| No. | Title | Air date | Timeslot | Viewers | Rank | Viewers | Rank | Total viewers | Ref(s) |
|---|---|---|---|---|---|---|---|---|---|
| 1 | Challenge 1 | 28 April 2019 | Sunday 7:00pm | 1,377,000 | 1 | 159,000 | 1 | 1,536,000 | |
| 2 | Challenge 2 | 29 April 2019 | Monday 7:30pm | 1,053,000 | 1 | 197,000 | 1 | 1,250,000 | |
| 3 | Challenge 3 | 30 April 2019 | Tuesday 7:30pm | 1,022,000 | 3 | 155,000 | 1 | 1,177,000 | |
| 4 | Challenge 4 | 5 May 2019 | Sunday 7:00pm | 1,091,000 | 2 | 137,000 | 1 | 1,228,000 | |
| 5 | Challenge 5 | 6 May 2019 | Monday 7:30pm | 1,022,000 | 3 | 203,000 | 1 | 1,225,000 | |
| 6 | Challenge 6 | 7 May 2019 | Tuesday 7:30pm | 1,068,000 | 1 | 200,000 | 1 | 1,268,000 | |
| 7 | Challenge 7 | 12 May 2019 | Sunday 7:00pm | 1,126,000 | 1 | 140,000 | 1 | 1,266,000 | |
| 8 | Challenge 8 | 13 May 2019 | Monday 7:30pm | 1,075,000 | 2 | 196,000 | 1 | 1,271,000 | |
| 9 | Grand Final Winners Announced | 14 May 2019 | Tuesday 7:30pm Tuesday 9:00pm | 1,249,000 1,493,000 | 2 1 | 202,000 241,000 | 2 1 | 1,451,000 1,734,000 | |
