= Ryan McNaught =

Australian Lego designer (born 1973)

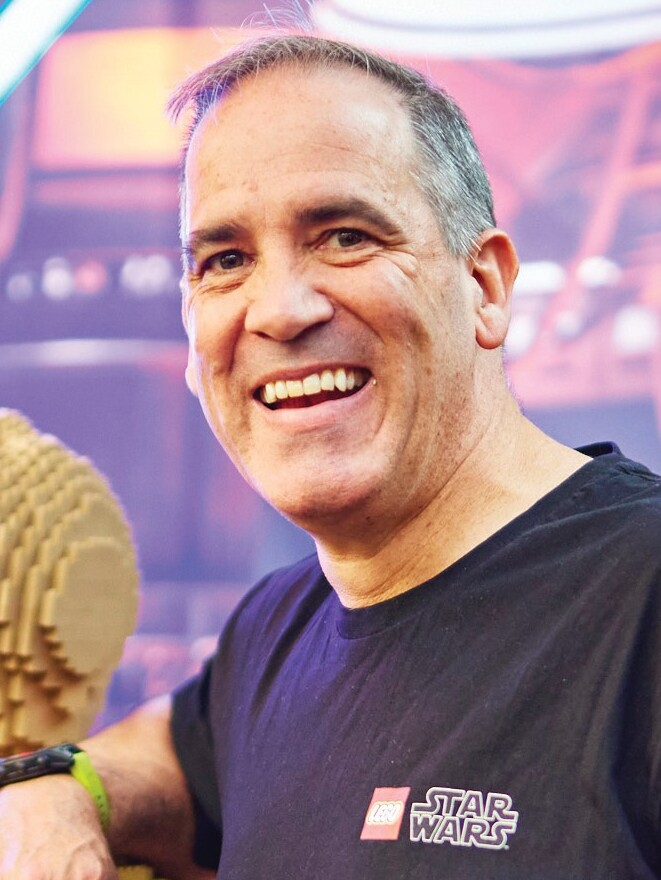
- McNaught in 2026
- Born: 1973 (age 52–53); Shepparton, Victoria, Australia
- Other name: The Brickman
- Occupations: Lego designer; TV personality
- Known for: Judge of Australian TV series Lego Masters
- Notable work: Large Lego structures
- Spouse: Tracey Britten
- Website: www.thebrickman.com

Ryan "The Brickman" McNaught (born 1973), is an Australian Lego designer and Lego Certified Professional. He is one of only twenty-four LEGO Certified Professionals globally, and the only from the Southern Hemisphere. In 2019, he joined the TV series Lego Masters Australia, as the main competition judge alongside host Hamish Blake.

== Early life and education ==
McNaught was born in 1973 and grew up in Shepparton, Victoria. His parents owned a travel agency in Melbourne. McNaught got his first Lego set from his grandmother when he was three years old. In 1978, at the age of five, McNaught won a Master Builders' Certificate in the Victoria finals of the Myer Lego National Building Competition.

As a teenager, he turned his attention to sport. Playing football for Catholic College Bendigo, later for Kangaroo Flat; he also played cricket for Sandhurst. He left school and worked in information technology, moving to Melbourne, where he played cricket for South Yarra. In 2004, he started working at Regency Media, a manufacturer of CDs and DVDs, eventually becoming CIO.

== Career ==
=== Lego designing ===
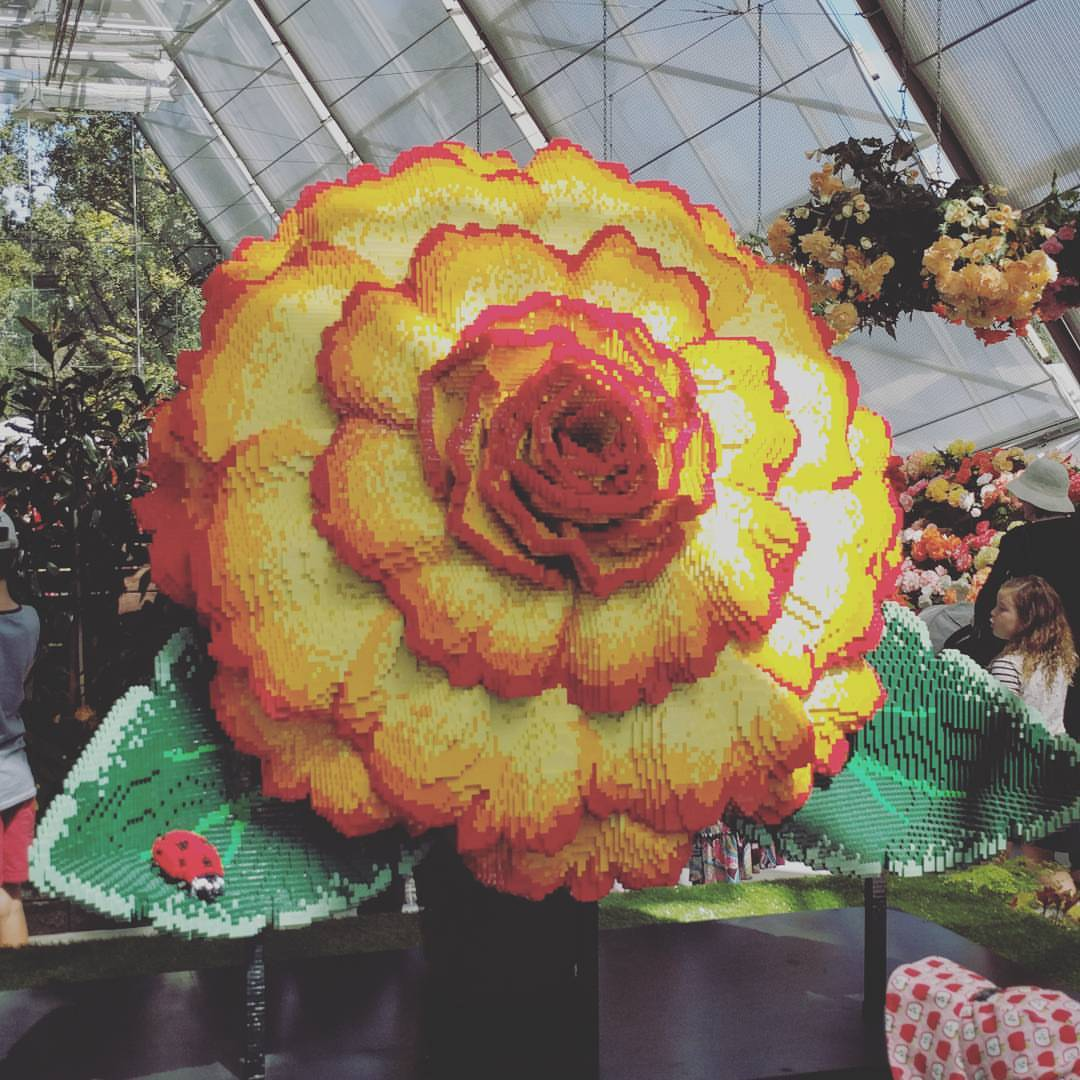
A large Lego flower sculpture created by Ryan McNaught

McNaught exhibited an own-build remote-controlled Lego model of the Qantas Airbus A380 at the fourth Brickvention in Melbourne in 2010, winning the vote for 'Best in Show'.

McNaught took the A380 to the international Brickworld event in Chicago, and was seen by a representative of the Lego company. McNaught was asked if he would be interested in becoming a Lego Certified Professional (LCP). The LCP are a small number (21 as of 2021) of professional adult Lego builders whom the Lego Group consider to be trusted business partners, selected for their building proficiency and professional approach towards Lego fans and the public. After he went through the six-month qualification process he became the first and only LCP in the Southern Hemisphere. In 2013 he quit his job at Regency Media, and started his own business. Based in Melbourne, McNaught is the managing director of The Brickman. He has two full-time and two casual employees, working as Lego artists and craftspeople. In his warehouse he holds five million Lego bricks.

With his team McNaught has built Lego structures for Lego offices, produced four global touring exhibitions, models for museums, galleries and shopping centres worldwide. For the 2016 AFL Grand Final, he built a Lego MCG at Myer in Melbourne. He has also made large Lego models of the Colosseum, the Acropolis, and Pompeii for the Nicholson Museum at the Sydney University. In 2025, McNaught designed Wildlife Bricks, a series of four limited-edition Lego animal sets that were distributed by Lego Stores in Australia and New Zealand to customers that spent AU$299 or more on Lego products.

=== Lego Masters ===
In 2019, McNaught was selected to be the judge in the Australian reality television Lego Master. A Lego Masters series based on the British series of the same name in which teams compete to build the best Lego project. The first season premiered on 28 April 2019 on Nine Network hosted by Hamish Blake. Season 2 started in 2020.

=== Books ===
In 2020, McNaught published Brickman's Family Challenge Book. In 2022, he published his second book: The Bricktionary: Brickman's ultimate Lego A–Z. His third book Brickman's Big Book of Better Builds was released later the same year.

== Personal life ==
McNaught is married to Tracy Britten.
