= 2022 in Australian television =

This is a list of Australian television-related events, debuts, finales, and cancellations that occurred in 2022, the 67th year of continuous operation of television in Australia.

== Events ==
=== January ===
Date	Event	Source
1	The ABC's coverage of the annual midnight Sydney New Year's Eve fireworks is watched by 1.19 million viewers.	
8	Rebecca Maddern rejoins the Seven News team as a co-anchor on Seven News Melbourne's weekend bulletins, after quitting her Channel Nine presenting roles on Weekend Today, Australian Ninja Warrior and The Footy Show in November 2021.	
17	It is announced that the Seven Network have secured the rights to screen NFL coverage until 2024.	
25	It is announced that the Logie Awards will move venues, from The Star Gold Coast, to the Gold Coast Convention and Exhibition Centre.	
29	The 2022 Australian Open women's final, between Australian Ash Barty and American Danielle Collins attracted a peak audience of 4.261 million viewers, with an average of 3.577 million. It is the highest-rated Australian Open women's singles final in OzTAM history, and is the second highest-rating sport event in the past twelve months, behind the 2021 AFL Grand Final which averaged 4.11 million viewers.	
30	Dylan Lewis wins the eighth season of I'm a Celebrity... Get Me Out of Here!.	
31	Seven News Perth anchors Rick Ardon and Sussanah Carr are declared the longest-serving TV news anchor duo by the Guinness World Records. They have presented the program since 24 January 1985, with a total duration of 36 years and 361 days.	

=== February ===
Date	Event	Source
26	Foxtel suspends broadcast distribution of the Russian television network RT in Australia.	

=== March ===
Date	Event	Source
3	Fremantle confirms that Neighbours will be axed after thirty-seven years on air, after being unable to find another broadcast partner.	
12	On a rare occasion, the Seven Network, Nine Network and Network 10 co-produce a telethon, titled Australia Unites: Red Cross Flood Appeal, to raise funds for people affected by the floods in Queensland and New South Wales.	
20	It is announced that the Seven Network have extended the rights to broadcast the Magic Millions horse racing event until 2027.	
31	Ella Rossanis wins the sixth season of The Great Australian Bake Off.	

=== April ===
Date	Event	Source
12	Victoria is confirmed as the hosts of the 2026 Commonwealth Games, most likely, but not confirmed, to be broadcast on the Seven Network.	

=== May ===
Date	Event	Source
16	Brothers Joss and Henry Woodyard win the fourth season of Lego Masters.	
21	ABC TV, the Seven Network, Sky News Australia, Network 10 and the Nine Network hosts their rolling coverage of the 2022 Australian federal election. The ABC dominated the coverage with a primary channel share of 27.9%, with ABC News also the top multichannel with a 15.2% share and a 44.3% share across the whole ABC network.	
23	SBS WorldWatch launches on Channel 35.	
29	Lachie Gill wins the eleventh season of The Voice.	

=== June ===
Date	Event	Source
1	Ray Warren announces that he is retiring from sports commentary.	
13	Dubbed as "Series 3, Part 2", Bluey airs a further eleven episodes as part of its third series.	
19	The Logies are held on the Gold Coast, with Hamish Blake winning both his Second Gold Logie and the Inaugural Bert Newton Award for Most Popular Presenter, while Bruce McAvaney becomes the First Sportscaster inducted into the Hall of Fame.	
21	Benji Marshall wins the sixth season of The Celebrity Apprentice Australia.	
30	Leigh Sales presents her final report on current affairs program 7:30. She had hosted the program since its first episode in 2011. She is to be replaced by Sarah Ferguson.	
30	The Australian Broadcasting Corporation celebrates ninety years on air with a live two-hour program, ABC 90 Celebrate!, ahead of its official anniversary the following day.	

=== July ===
Date	Event	Source
4	The second episode of Network 10's news program 10 News First: Breakfast records the lowest-ever recorded viewer ratings in Australian television history, with an average of 44 Australian viewers. However, this record was later beaten on August 10, when the program recorded zero viewers in Perth.	
4	Network 10's Pilot Showcase is released on 10Play. The series consists of six separate pilot episodes, and is similar to the network's previous series Pilot Week, which was broadcast on the network. Owing to poor ratings, none of the pilots are developed into full series.	
12	Reggie Sorensen wins the fourteenth series of the Australian version of Big Brother. She is the only person to have won the series twice, having also won the third season in 2003.	
12	Billie McKay wins the fourteenth series of MasterChef Australia. Like Sorensen, she is the only person to have won the series twice, having also won the seventh series in 2015.	
22	Regional broadcasters Prime7 and GWN7 broadcast their final branded Prime7 News and GWN7 News bulletins before being rebadged as Seven News Local the following Monday.	
24	Having last aired in 2011, the first episode of the revival series of This is Your Life is broadcast on Channel 7. In the first episode, host Melissa Doyle surprises Ian Thorpe with the big red book.	
28	The final episode of Neighbours is broadcast in Australia on Network 10 and 10 Peach. The show was axed after thirty-seven years on air.	
29	The Seven Network begins its coverage of the 2022 Commonwealth Games, broadcast live from Birmingham, England on Channel 7, 7mate and 7plus.	

=== August ===
Date	Event	Source
3	Aaron Seeto and Karly Fisher win the eighth season of Beauty and the Geek Australia.	
16	It is announced that Georgie Tunny is to join The Project as co-presenter permanently, having filled in as co-presenter in April when Carrie Bickmore took leave.	
24	It is announced that Seven News is the most-watched news program in Australia for 2022.	
28	Melody Thornton wins the fourth season of The Masked Singer.	
31	Janelle Halil and Monzir Hamdin win the twelfth series of My Kitchen Rules.	

=== September ===
Date	Event	Source
21	After ten years, the final episode of Shaun Micallef's Mad as Hell airs on ABC TV.	

=== November ===
Date	Event	Source
6	Omar Slaimankhel and Ozman "Oz" Abu Malik win the eighteenth season of The Block, selling their home for $5.666 million, and winning a profit of $1.586 million, the highest profit in the show's history.	
20	Lisa Wilkinson leaves The Project, having co-presented the program since 2017.	
23	After having left Studio 10, it is announced that Sarah Harris is to co-present The Project from Sunday to Thursday.	
24	After sixteen years, Tracy Grimshaw presents her final A Current Affair bulletin.	
28	The Seven Network wins the 2022 ratings year, with the AFL Grand Final being the most-watched program of the year. The final episode of The Block, which aired on the Nine Network, was the most-watched non-sports program in 2022. Second in the ratings were the Nine Network, followed by the ABC in third, Network 10 in fourth, and SBS in fifth place.	
30	The Seven Network reconfigures their channel lineup in preparation for the launch of 7Bravo on channel 75/65, which results in 7flix becoming a MPEG-4 SD channel, 7two becoming a MPEG-4 HD only channel in regional Queensland, 7mate becoming a MPEG-4 HD only channel and ishop TV moving to channel 67 (in former Prime7/GWN7 areas only).	
30	Carrie Bickmore leaves The Project, having co-presented the program since its first episode in 2009.	

=== December ===
Date	Event	Source
7	Peter Hellier leaves The Project, having co-presented the program since 2014.	
19	The Project confirms its new panel of hosts for 2023. Joining Waleed Aly, Sarah Harris, Hamish Macdonald and Georgie Tunny are Sam Taunton, who will co-host from Monday to Thursday, and Michael Hing, who will co-host on Friday and Sunday.	

== Premieres ==
=== Domestic series ===
List of domestic television series premieres
Program	Original airdate	Network(s)	Source
The PM's Daughter	1 January	ABC Me	
The Tourist	1 January (BBC One, BBC iPlayer), 2 January (Stan), 3 March (HBO Max)	BBC One, BBC iPlayer (UK), Stan (AUS), HBO Max (US)	
Mates on a Mission	13 January	Seven Network	
Wolf Life Me	13 January	Stan Peacock	
Muster Dogs	23 January	ABC TV	
The Voice Generations	31 January	Seven Network	
Troppo	27 February	ABC TV	
Would I Lie to You?	28 February	Network 10	
More Than This	4 March	Paramount+	
MaveriX	1 April	ABC Me	
Underbelly: Vanishing Act	3 April	Nine Network	
Barons	24 April	ABC TV	
Rock Island Mysteries	2 May	10 Shake	
Surviving Summer	3 June	Netflix	
The Twelve	21 June	Showcase	
True Colours	4 July	SBS, NITV	
Hunted	17 July	Network 10	
Darby and Joan	8 August	Acorn TV	
After the Verdict	10 August	Nine Network	
Soundtrack to Our Teenage Zombie Apocalypse	15 August	ABC Me	
Echoes	19 August	Netflix	
Summer Love	31 August	ABC TV	
Savage River	4 September	ABC TV, iview	
Heartbreak High	14 September	Netflix	
Bali 2002	25 September	Nine Network, Stan	
The Real Love Boat	5 October	Network 10	
The Traitors	16 October	Network 10	
Stuff the British Stole	1 November	ABC	
Single, Out	12 November (Film Festival), 11 August 2023 (Here TV)	Melbourne Queer Film Festival (AUS), Here TV (US)	
The Challenge: Australia	14 November	Network 10	
Barrumbi Kids	18 November	NITV	
Irreverent	30 November (Peacock), 4 December (Netflix)	Peacock (US), Netflix (AUS)	
Colin from Accounts	1 December	Binge, Foxtel	
United	7 December	Network Ten, Amazon Prime Video	
Dream Big	16 December	Network 10, Paramount+, Amazon Prime Video	
Riptide	27 December (Channel 5), 28 June 2023 (Network 10)	Channel 5 (UK), Network 10 (AUS)	

== Television channels ==
=== New channels ===
Date	Name	Notes	Reference
23 May	SBS WorldWatch		
18 September	Gecko		
2 December	10play FAST	10play launches thirteen free ad-supported streaming television (FAST) channels, specialising in single-show, franchise, genre, and multi-show television programs.	

=== Closed channels ===
Date	Name	Notes	Reference
27 February	Spike		
6 June–25 July	Prime7/GWN7	From 6 June, these channels will be gradually phased out. By 25 July, the final removal of the Prime and GWN brands will be completed, to be replaced with the Seven Network brand.	
12 August	Spree TV		

== Programming changes ==
=== Changes to network affiliation ===
Criterion for inclusion in the following list is that Australian premiere episodes will air in Australia for the first time on a new channel. This includes when a program is moved from a free-to-air network's primary channel to a digital multi-channel, as well as when a program moves between subscription television channels – provided the preceding criterion is met. Ended television series which change networks for repeat broadcasts are not included in the list.

List of domestic television series which changed network affiliation
Program	Date	New network	Previous network	Source

List of international television programs which changed network affiliation
Program	Date	New network	Previous network	Country of origin	Source

=== Free-to-air premieres ===
This is a list of programs which made their premiere on Australian free-to-air television that had previously premiered on Australian subscription television. Programs may still air on the original subscription television network.

List of international television programs which premiered on free-to-air television for the first time
Program	Date	Free-to-air network	Subscription network(s)	Country of origin	Source

=== Subscription premieres ===
This is a list of programs which made their debut on Australian subscription television, having previously premiered on Australian free-to-air television. Programs may still air (first or repeat) on the original free-to-air television network.

List of domestic television programs which premiered on subscription television for the first time
Program	Date	Free-to-air network	Subscription network(s)	Source

=== Returning programs ===
Australian produced programs which are returning with a new season after being absent from television from the previous calendar year.

Program	Return date	Previous run	Type of return	Previous channel	New/same channel	Source
This Is Your Life	24 July 2022	1975-1980 1995-2005 2008 2011	Revival	Seven Network (1975-1980), Nine Network (1995-2005, 2008, 2011)	Seven Network	
Australian Idol	30 January 2023	2003–2009	Revival	Network Ten	Seven Network	

=== Endings ===
List of domestic television series endings
Program	End date	Network(s)	Start date	Source
Mates on a Mission	27 January 2022	Seven Network	13 January 2022	
The Weakest Link	1 February 2022	Nine Network	25 May 2021	
Crikey! It's the Irwins	5 February 2022	Animal Planet, Discovery+	28 October 2018	
Frayed	30 March 2022	ABC TV, Sky One, Sky Max	26 September 2019	
More Than This	4 March 2022	Paramount+	4 March 2022	
Underbelly: Vanishing Act	4 April 2022	Nine Network	3 April 2022	
Barons	24 April 2022	ABC TV	12 June 2022	
The Feed	28 June 2022	SBS	20 May 2013	
Julia Zemiro's Home Delivery	10 July 2022	ABC TV	18 September 2013	
Neighbours	28 July 2022	10 Peach	18 March 1985	
The Secrets She Keeps	16 August 2022	Network 10, Paramount+	22 April 2020	
Echoes	19 August 2022	Netflix	19 August 2022	
Shaun Micallef's Mad as Hell	21 September 2022	ABC TV	25 May 2012	
Bali 2002	25 September 2022	Nine Network, Stan	25 September 2022	
Luxe Listings Sydney	21 October 2022	Amazon Prime Video	9 July 2021	
The Real Love Boat	17 November 2022	Network 10	5 October 2022	
The Living Room	25 November 2022	Network 10	11 May 2012	
United	7 December 2022	Network 10, Amazon Prime Video	7 December 2022	
Chris Smith Tonight	11 December 2022	Sky News Australia	30 January 2020	
Dream Big	16 December 2022	Network 10, Paramount+, Amazon Prime Video	16 December 2022	
Snackmasters	19 December 2022	Nine Network	29 November 2021	
Riptide	30 December 2022	Channel 5 (UK), Network 10 (AUS)	27 December 2022	

== Deaths ==
Name	Date	Age	Broadcast notability	Reference
Illankovan Frank	4 January	not given	Indian-born veteran cameraman, who worked for Nine News.	
Miranda Fryer	6 January	aged 34	Former child actress, who, at eighteen months, starred in Neighbours for three years and was the first actress to play Sky Mangel.	
Leon Lissek	13 January	aged 82	Actor best known for TV serial The Sullivans. Lissek also worked in Britain and appeared on television serial EastEnders and in several film roles.	
Scot Palmer	15 January	aged 84	Australian rules football sports journalist, who regularly appeared on the Seven Network.	
Judy Banks	23 January	aged 86	Banks, a former stage actress, was an early star on television in Brisbane, best known as a children's presenter of Fredd Bear's Breakfast-A-Go-Go.	
Colin Stevenson	14 February	aged 81	Long-time audio department head with Melbourne television station GTV.	
Neil Balnaves	22 February	aged 77	Veteran television executive and philanthropist, best known for founding the Southern Star Group.	
Brian Davies	7 March	aged 86	Producer and journalist, who worked for the Australian Broadcasting Corporation, Patrician Films and the Seven Network. After television, he worked for the NSW National Parks and Wildlife Service as a journalist.	
Alan Hopgood	19 March	aged 87	Actor and playwright, known for Bellbird, Prisoner and Neighbours.	
Rob Readings	19 March	aged 79	Brisbane news reader who worked for the Nine Network	
Max Walsh	23 March	aged 84	Political correspondent for Network 10, the Nine Network and the Australian Broadcasting Corporation.	
Ernie Carroll	30 March	aged 92	Creator of Hey Hey It's Saturday character Ossie Ostrich.	
Christopher Muir	2 May	aged 91	Producer, radio announcer and director that worked at the Australian Broadcasting Corporation. Became the ABC's head of drama in 1982.	
Richard Connolly	4 May	aged 94	Composer best known for writing the theme tune to Play School, There's a Bear in There. Started working with the Australian Broadcasting Corporation in 1956 for religious broadcasts and retired in 1988.	
Andrew Symonds	14 May	aged 46	Former cricketer and Fox Sports commentator	
Caroline Jones	20 May	aged 84	TV current affairs presenter and journalist and social commentator of Four Corners and Australian Story.	
Erin Jayne Plummer	22 May	aged 42	Television personality and infomercial host who appeared regularly on morning television shows, including Today Extra and Studio 10.	
Tommy Dysart	7 June	aged 86	Actor in Prisoner and Neighbours. Also a television commercial spokesman.	
Yvette Mooney	11 June	aged 58	Seven News Perth newsreader and Today Tonight presenter.	
Carol Raye	19 June	aged 99	British-born actress, known for The Mavis Bramston Show, Blankety Blanks and Number 96.	
Di Kershaw	22 July	aged 76	Married to Mick. They were Indigenous art dealers (Mick still is) and both appeared on Gogglebox Australia together.	
Shirley Barrett	3 August	aged 60	Film director and screenwriter. TV credits include Packed to the Rafters, Wild Boys, 'House Husbands, 'Mr & Mrs Murder, Love Child, Winter, A Place to Call Home, Offspring (on which she was also a writer of), Home and Away and Five Bedrooms. Her debut feature Love Serenade was awarded the Caméra d'Or in 1996.	
Philip Dalkin	4 August	aged 67	Prolific screenwriter, who wrote shows including All Together Now, Col'n Carpenter, Sea Patrol, Stingers and The Deep.	
John Tingle	6 August	aged 90	Australian politician who started his career in journalism and the father of Laura Tingle. Before becoming a politician, founding the Shooters Party, he worked for television networks and stations including the Seven Network, WIN4 in Wollongong, the Nine Network, ABC TV Queensland and Northern Territory and SBS, presenting TV programs.	
Hilary Linstead	6 August	aged 83	Trailblazing film and television agent, representing some of Australia's top film and television actors, directors and writers.	
Marshall Napier	14 August	aged 70	New Zealand-born actor who starred in drama series All Saints and McLeod's Daughters.	
Vincent Gil	21 August	aged 83	Character actor in numerous TV serials, including Homicide, A Country Practice, Prisoner and Neighbours.	
John Tulloh	21 August	aged 82	Longtime international news editor for the Australian Broadcasting Corporation, serving 16 years.	
Terry McDermott	1 September	not given	Lifeguard that appeared on Bondi Rescue.	
Basia Bonkowski	3 September	not given	Television presenter and producer, known for presenting Rock Around the World and Continental Drift and producing RBT.	
Jack Charles	13 September	aged 79	Actor and Aboriginal elder. He acted in The Chant of Jimmie Blacksmith, Cleverman and numerous other television shows and films.	
John Hamblin	21 September	aged 87	British-born host of Play School.	
Pam Ellis	29 September	aged 90	Touch of Elegance co-host.	
Peter Yeldham	September	aged 95	Veteran screenwriter and novelist	
John Westacott	9 October	aged in his early 70s'	Former Nine News director, and executive producer of 60 Minutes	
Peter de Visser	October	not given	Former Hey Hey It's Saturday musical director.	
Martin Vaughan	October	aged 91	Actor and musician, best known for starring in the 26-part miniseries Power Without Glory.	
John F. Knight	27 November	aged 94	TV doctor, who appeared on The Mike Walsh Show and The Midday Show as "Dr. James Wright".	
Tony Barry	21 December	aged 81	Appeared in numerous TV series, including The Box.	
Joan Sydney	28 December	aged 86	Actress best known for soap opera roles including A Country Practice, E Street and Neighbours.	
Bobby Driessen	30 December	aged 56	Young Talent Time cast member, who co-hosted The Cartoon Company with YTT co-star Karen Dunkerton.	
Cary Young	31 December	aged 83	A quiz champion, best known for regularly competing on Sale of the Century.	
