= Geeling Ng =

New Zealand model, actress and restaurateur

Geeling Ching (born 1959 or 1960), previously known mononymously as Geeling or as Geeling Ng is a New Zealand model, actress, and restaurateur. Ching is best known for her role playing the titular character in David Bowie's 1983 music video for "China Girl".

== Career ==
Ching began her career as a model, working for Thornton Hall and Adrienne Winkelmann before moving to Sydney in her early 20s. In Sydney she worked as a cook at The Bayswater Brasserie and auditioned for the role in David Bowie's China Girl role. Following her appearance in the video and a brief affair with Bowie she appeared in several films such as Mad Max Beyond Thunderdome (1985), Illustrious Energy (1988) and Desperate Remedies (1993). She also hosted Kulture Shock and a Asia Downunder. Then working as operations manager at a restaurant in Auckland's Viaduct.

In 2026, Ching walked the NZFW opening event.

== Filmography ==
=== Film ===
Year	Title	Role	Notes
1985	Mad Max Beyond Thunderdome	Aunty's Guard	Credited as Geeling
1988	Illustrious Energy	Li	Credited as Geeling
1993	Desperate Remedies	Su Lim	Credited as Geeling Ching
2013	Ghost Bride	Madam Yin	
2023	Night Freaks	Agent One	Credited as Geeling Ching

=== Television ===
Year	Title	Role	Notes
1987–1990	Gloss	Jasmine Sage	
1993	Soldier Soldier	Chinese Shop Assistant 1	1 episode
1993–1996	Ethnic Cooking	as Herself	Presenter
1995	Corbans Fashion Quarterly Collections	as Herself	Model
1996	Letter to Blanchy	Mrs. Lim	1 episode
1997	Shortland Street	Angelina Skeggins	1 episode
1998	Double Booking	Glenys	TV short film
2006	Asia Downunder	as Herself	Presenter, 1 episode
2008	Dancing with the Stars	as Herself	Contestant
2008	The Jaquie Brown Diaries	Elena	6 episodes
2018	The Adventures of Suzy Boon	Ozu	3 episodes, as Geeling Ching
2022	Princess of Chaos	Helen Young	TV film, as Geeling Ching

=== Music videos ===
Year	Title	Artist	Role	Notes
1983	"China Girl"	David Bowie	China Girl	

== See also ==
- List of New Zealand television personalities
