= Continental Drift (disambiguation) =

Continental drift is the movement of Earth's continents relative to each other.

Continental Drift may also refer to:

- Continental Drift (novel), a 1985 novel by Russell Banks
- Continental Drift (TV series), an Australian music television show
- Ice Age: Continental Drift, a 2012 animated film and the fourth installment in the Ice Age film series
- Continental Drift (South), a 2022 Swiss film
- "Continental Drift", song by The Rolling Stones

== See also ==
- Continental Drifter, a book by Tim Moore
- Continental Drifters, an American rock band
