= The L Word: Generation Q =

2019 American drama television series

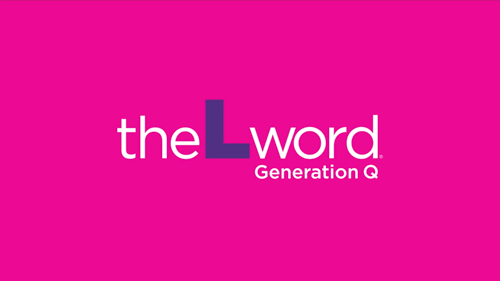
- Genre: Drama
- Created by: Ilene Chaiken; Kathy Greenberg; Michele Abbott
- Developed by: Marja-Lewis Ryan
- Showrunner: Marja-Lewis Ryan
- Starring: Jennifer Beals; Kate Moennig; Leisha Hailey; Arienne Mandi; Sepideh Moafi; Leo Sheng; Jacqueline Toboni; Rosanny Zayas; Jordan Hull; Jamie Clayton
- Music by: Heather McIntosh & Allyson Newman
- Country of origin: United States
- Original language: English
- No. of seasons: 3
- No. of episodes: 28

Production
- Executive producers: Jennifer Beals; Kate Moennig; Leisha Hailey; Steph Green; Ilene Chaiken; Allyce Ozarski; Kristen Campo; Marja-Lewis Ryan; Maisha Closson; Melody Derloshon
- Producers: Tatiana Suarez-Pico; Julie Hartley
- Cinematography: Sandra Valde-Hansen; Moira Morel; Danny Grunes
- Editors: Omar Hassan-Reep; Tamara Luciano; Christal Khatib; Matthew D. Horn; Crystal Leong; Sarah E. Williams; Julie Cohen; Bradley Cheyne; Laura Weinberg; Monique Batac
- Running time: 53–61 minutes
- Production companies: MLR Original; Showtime Networks

Original release
- Network: Showtime
- Release: December 8, 2019 – January 22, 2023

The L Word: Generation Q is an American drama television series produced by Showtime that premiered on December 8, 2019, and ran for three seasons, ending in April 2023. It is a sequel series to The L Word, which aired on Showtime from 2004 to 2009. Similar to its predecessor, the series follows the lives of a queer group of friends who live in Los Angeles, California.

A first-look screening of the series took place on December 9, 2019, hosted by House of Pride, to coincide with the American release. In January 2020, Showtime renewed the series for a second season which premiered on August 8, 2021. In February 2022, the series was renewed for a third season which premiered on November 20, 2022. In March 2023, following low viewership, the series was canceled after three seasons, and in April 2023, it was removed from Showtime platforms.

== Synopsis ==
The show centers on a group of diverse queer characters experiencing love, heartbreak, sex, setbacks, personal growth and success in Los Angeles. Generation Q is set over ten years after The L Word, in the new setting of Silver Lake, Los Angeles. Several actors from the original series returned to reprise their roles alongside a new ensemble of diverse characters.

== Cast and characters ==
=== Main ===
- Jennifer Beals as Bette Porter-Kennard, the managing director at Isaac Zakarian's art gallery. In between the events of The L Word and Generation Q, she married and divorced her partner, Tina Kennard, but ends up remarrying her at the end of season 3. Beals reprises her role from The L Word.
- Kate Moennig as Shane McCutcheon, an androgynous and highly sexual lesbian former hairdresser, now the owner of "Dana's", a gay bar named after her deceased friend, Dana Fairbanks. Moennig reprises her role from The L Word.
- Leisha Hailey as Alice Pieszecki, a talk show host and author. Hailey reprises her role from The L Word.
- Arienne Mandi as Dani Nùñez, Bette's former PR manager, Sophie's ex-fiancée and CEO of "Núñez Incorporated" following her father's arrest. She is Iranian on her deceased mother's side.
- Sepideh Moafi as Gigi Ghorbani, the ex-wife of Nat Bailey and co-mother of their children, and currently Dani's girlfriend. Her real name is Golnar, and "Gigi" is a nickname.
- Leo Sheng as Micah Lee, an adjunct professor and therapist working for Nat Bailey who is a trans man, and Maribel Suarez's boyfriend
- Jacqueline Toboni as Sarah Finley, an executive assistant from a religious family. She goes by "Finley", previously worked for Alice Pieszecki and had an affair with Sophie which led to the end of Sophie and Dani's relationship.
- Rosanny Zayas as Sophie Suarez, a TV producer for Alice's show and Dani's ex-fiancée, having had an affair with Finley not long before their wedding. She and Finley later enter a relationship, which becomes strained due to Finley's alcoholism.
- Jordan Hull as Angelica "Angie" Porter-Kennard (season 2–3; recurring season 1), Bette's daughter with her ex-wife, Tina Kennard, and half-sister of Kayla Allenwood
- Jamie Clayton as Tess Van De Berg (season 3; recurring seasons 1–2), the bartender/manager of Dana's, a recovering alcoholic and girlfriend of Shane

=== Recurring ===
- Freddy Miyares as José (seasons 1–2), the new property manager of Dani, Sophie and Micah's home, Micah's ex-boyfriend and husband of Scott
- Carlos Leal as Rodolfo Nùñez, Dani's father
- Brian Michael Smith as Pierce Williams (season 1), Bette's campaign manager who is a trans man
- Stephanie Allynne as Natalie "Nat" Bailey, Gigi's ex-wife and Alice's partner until she realizes she is polyamorous, which leads Alice to end their relationship
- Jillian Mercado as Maribel Suarez, Sophie's sister and an immigration attorney, and Micah's girlfriend
- Olivia Thirlby as Rebecca (season 1), a bisexual Congregationalist minister (MCC) who briefly dates Finley
- Latarsha Rose as Felicity Adams, an ex-employee and ex-lover of Bette's
- Sophie Giannamore as Jordi Sanbolino, Angelica's girlfriend
- Lex Scott Davis as Quiara Thompson, a popular singer and Shane's manipulative ex-wife
- Donald Faison as Tom Maultsby (season 2; guest star season 3), an editor who becomes interested in Alice's book and later begins a relationship with her
- Rosie O'Donnell as Carrie (seasons 2–3), the girlfriend of Misty. She was previously engaged to Tina Kennard.
- Simon Longnight as Hendrix (season 3), a creative writing instructor at Angie's college and her new love interest after Jordi breaks up with her
- Carmen LoBue as Dre (season 3), Dani's love interest who had a history with Sophie
- Paula Andrea Placido as Roxy (season 3), Dani's childhood best friend who becomes involved in a love triangle

=== Special guests ===
- Laurel Holloman as Tina Kennard, Angelica's biological mother and Bette's wife. The two divorced between shows and Tina became engaged to Carrie Walsh. Tina forgave Bette and remarried her in season 3. Holloman reprises her role from The L Word.
- Roxane Gay as herself
- Megan Rapinoe as herself
- Margaret Cho as herself (season 3)
- Fletcher as herself (season 3)

=== Guest starring ===
- Fortune Feimster as Heather
- Jeffrey Muller as Tyler Adams, the ex-husband of Felicity Adams who harbors a grudge against Bette Porter ever since Felicity slept with her
- Mercedes Mason as Lena, Tess' ex-girlfriend
- Rex Linn as Jeff Milner, the Mayor of Los Angeles who won against Bette by exposing her lack of family values and adulterous lifestyle
- Griffin Dunne as Isaac Zakarian (season 2), the owner of an art gallery who hires Bette despite her dislike for his views
- Brook'Lynn Sanders as Kayla Allenwood (season 2), Angie's half-sister from Marcus Allenwood
- Vanessa Estelle Williams as Pippa Pascal (seasons 2–3), a talented artist whose career Bette seeks to revive. She later began a relationship with Bette.
- Anne Archer as Lenore Pieszecki (season 2), Alice's mother. Archer reprises her role from The L Word.
- Rosanna Arquette as Cherie Jaffe (season 2), Shane's ex-lover and Tess's brief new girlfriend but who still pursues Shane. Arquette reprises her role from The L Word.
- Mark Berry as Marcus Allenwood (season 2), an artist and the sperm donor of Angelica Porter-Kennard. Berry replaces Mark Gibson, who portrayed Marcus in The L Word.
- Joanna Cassidy as Patty (season 3), Tess' mother who is suffering from multiple sclerosis and dementia
- Kehlani as Ivy (season 3), a makeup artist who is part of Alice's glam squad
- Joey Lauren Adams as Taylor (season 3), a barista who becomes Alice's love interest
- Daniel Sea as Max Sweeney (season 3), Jenny's ex-partner, now a trans parent of four. Sea reprises their role from The L Word.
- Erin Daniels as Dana Fairbanks (season 3), Alice's ex-girlfriend who died of breast cancer and who appears as a figment of Alice's imagination. Daniels reprises her role from The L Word.

== Episodes ==
=== Series overview ===
Season	Episodes	Originally released	
Season	Episodes	First released	Last released
1	8	December 8, 2019	January 26, 2020
2	10	August 8, 2021	October 11, 2021
3	10	November 20, 2022	January 22, 2023

=== Season 1 (2019–20) ===
No. overall	No. in season	Title	Directed by	Written by	Original release date	U.S. viewers (millions)
1	1	"Let's Do It Again"	Steph Green	Marja-Lewis Ryan	December 8, 2019	0.241
Over ten years after the death of Jenny Schecter, Bette Porter is running for Mayor of Los Angeles to succeed Eric Garcetti, but her electoral position is threatened during a live press conference when a man, Tyler Adams, accuses her of having slept with his ex-wife, Felicity, who at the time was one of Bette's employees. Alice, now with her own successful talk show, is in a relationship with therapist Nat and struggles to mother Nat's two kids and get along with Nat's controlling ex-wife, Gigi, who is also the kids' biological mother. Shane moves back to Los Angeles after selling her hair salons in Paris and New York and reunites with Bette and Alice. Dani Nùñez, a PR executive for her father's company, is the girlfriend of one of Alice's show writers, Sophie Suarez, who works with Finley, Alice's personal assistant. Their flatmate, Micah Lee, is a trans man adjunct college professor who is crushing on their new neighbor José.
2	2	"Less Is More"	Allison Liddi-Brown	Marja-Lewis Ryan	December 15, 2019	0.236
Despite celebrating good news about their engagement, Dani reveals her new job as Bette's new PR manager and Sophie is upset for not having been consulted. Meanwhile, Alice's network is annoyed with the serious discussion when Bette appeared on the show, and they hire a man to help keep things "on brand". Finley has moved in with a reluctant Shane. Viewers discover the Planet is now a sports bar. Alice tries to be a better stepmom to Nat's kids with Shane's help, and has a heart-to-heart with Gigi. Bette talks to local LGBTQ+ youths to talk about issues of homelessness, and at the encouragement of Dani must meet Felicity for damage control. Shane is served with divorce papers, and Micah finally takes José on a date.
3	3	"Lost Love"	Sarah Pia Anderson	Regina Y. Hicks	December 22, 2019	0.248
Dani makes amends with her father. Jose cancels his date with Micah without explanation. Shane buys the former Planet to convert it into a lesbian bar. Shane hires Lena and Tess (lesbian couple) to manage the bar. Megan Rapinoe guest stars on Alice's talk show. When Angie's racist and homophobic classmate insults Bette, Angie punches her. The racist and homophobic private school suspends Angie while her classmate goes unpunished; Bette talks to Angie about racism. In her mayoral debate, Bette announces she has enrolled Angie in public school, winning an endorsement from the teachers' union. Finley discovers her new girlfriend Rebecca is a Priest. Alice learns that Nat and Gigi's common friends sided with Gigi after the breakup, even though Gigi had cheated on Nat, leaving Nat without friends. Out of sympathy, Alice brings them both together to reconcile the friendship. Dani witnesses Felicity enter Bette's hotel room.
4	4	"LA Times"	Steph Green	Melody Derloshon	December 29, 2019	0.226
Dani discovers that Bette and Felicity have resumed their affair. Dani confronts Felicity and warns her to stay away from Bette during the campaign, with Felicity insisting that she loves Bette. Dani confronts Bette as well, who confesses that her reason for running for mayor is due to her half-sister Kit's recent death from a heroin overdose, and that Felicity offered support in the aftermath. Dani implores Bette not to sabotage her campaign for the sake of sex. Dani makes amends with Sophie, and Sophie gives her an engagement ring that was her grandmother's. To celebrate Shane's 40th birthday, a surprise party is thrown at Shane's new bar, "Dana's". Nat confesses that she desires both Alice and Gigi, culminating in a threesome. Finley gets drunk and goes to Rebecca's house to profess her love, but chooses some hurtful wording; Rebecca tells her to leave. Micah encounters Jose at the party and they reconnect. Bette tells Dani that she is ending her relationship with Felicity. To Shane's shock, her ex-wife Quiara appears at the party.
5	5	"Labels"	Erica Watson	Tatiana Suarez-Pico	January 5, 2020	0.171
Alice, Nat and Gigi begin a three-way relationship. Dani's father sends Dani a prenuptial for Sophie to sign, stating that only Dani's biological children are entitled to be heirs. Dani and her father fight and Dani finds comfort from Bette. Quiara reveals to Shane that she is pregnant, but wants Shane back, and says Shane does not have to help raise the child. Shane is uncertain. José tells Micah he loves him, but Micah wants to take things slowly. After confessing to Tess that she slept with Shane, Lena disappears. Shane asks Finley to help out at "Dana's", where Tess begins drinking again and has sex with Finley. Bette breaks up with Felicity. Bette and friends attend Angie and Jordi's school play. Outside the theater in front of the press, an angry and drunk Tyler Adams, tipped off by Felicity, shames Bette about sleeping with Felicity again. Tyler attempts to assault Angie but Bette punches him; he hits his head on the ground and is knocked unconscious.
6	6	"Loose Ends"	Logan Kibens	Nancy C. Mejía	January 12, 2020	0.207
Bette considers dropping out of the mayoral race after Tyler threatens to press charges for assault. Ex-wife Tina arrives to offer support; they discuss past relationship issues and Tina not showing for Kit's funeral. Angie passes her driving test, and with support from Shane and Quiara, she tells Jordi she loves her. Shane reveals to Finley that Quiara is moving in and asks Finley to move out. Sophie and Finley have a "bro night" with Sophie discussing her troubles with Dani. Pierce and Dani debate what to do next for Bette, but Pierce, who identifies as a trans man, walks out when he discovers Dani knew about Bette's affair with Felicity. Alice, Nat and Gigi wrestle with their throuple status when Gigi outs them to a waitress. Dani and Sophie grow more distant due to lack of communication. Bette tells the press that she will continue to run for mayor, and she confesses to the media that the system failed her sister Kit, when Kit was administered opioids for pain without anyone asking if she had a history of addiction. At the end of the episode, Bette and Tina admit that they still love each other, and Bette asks Tina not to leave.
7	7	"Lose It All"	Jennifer Arnold	Francesca Butler	January 19, 2020	0.241
Micah's mother meets Jose and accidentally humiliates Micah by showing Jose pictures of Micah from before his transition, but amends are quickly made. Tina and Bette have dinner at Bette's house, where Tina mentions that she is moving to Los Angeles to be closer to Angie. Bette appears hopeful to rekindle their relationship, but Tina reveals that she is engaged to Carrie. Alice's show's ratings decline, nearing potential cancellation, with the network demanding something hot and viral to boost ratings. Alice walks in on Nat and Gigi in bed. Angry and hurt, Alice moves in with Shane. At a lunch a few days later, Nat and Gigi reveal to Alice that they want to continue being a throuple, but Alice leaves in disgust. Sophie's grandmother has an accident and is hospitalized; Dani is too busy to be at the hospital. Finley helps and comforts Sophie at the hospital and the two share a kiss. Sophie confides the kiss to her sister, who suggests that Sophie to tell Dani. Bette's mayoral rival, Jeff Milner, publishes a negative campaign ad denouncing Bette as a womanizer and a homewrecker. Despite this, Bette vows not to create any negative attack ads.
8	8	"Lapse in Judgement"	Marja-Lewis Ryan	Marja-Lewis Ryan & Allie Romano & Thomas Page McBee	January 26, 2020	0.218
A tight mayoral race results in a win for Milner. Quiara believes Shane was relieved by Quiara's miscarriage, throws her ring at Shane and leaves. Alice goes against the producers' wishes regarding content and invites Roxane Gay on the show; they discuss polyamorous relationships. Nat appears, goes on stage and tells Alice that she loves her and wants only her. Finley and Sophie have sex backstage, but in her guilt, Finley decides to leave for Missouri. Bette tells Dani that Milner has asked Bette to spearhead an opioid task force. Dani shares that her father's company has contributed big pharma money to Milner's campaign, meaning that Bette is being used by Milner, who has no real interest in opioid control. Bette and Angie go on a spiritual hike to grieve for Kit and the mayoral race loss. While attending Jose's art show, Micah meets a man claiming to be Jose's husband. Dani asks Sophie to elope with her to Hawaii. At the airport, Finley is on her way home to Missouri and Dani waits for the flight to Hawaii. Sophie makes a decision about whom to follow, running through the airport. It is left unrevealed if she has chosen Dani or Finley.

=== Season 2 (2021) ===
No. overall	No. in season	Title	Directed by	Written by	Original release date (Note: Each episode of the second season was released to stream on demand every Friday, ahead of its weekly Showtime on-air premiere.)	U.S. viewers (millions)
9	1	"Late to the Party"	Marja-Lewis Ryan	Marja-Lewis Ryan	August 8, 2021	0.118
It is revealed that Sophie chose Dani, but the two did not elope to Hawaii in the end, though Sophie continues to be plagued with guilt over her affair with Finley. Both Micah and Maribel try to pressure Sophie into confessing at the rehearsal dinner, but she cannot bring herself to do so, especially after Dani confesses that she harbored a crush on Bette while working for her but didn't act on it. Alice offers Sophie a promotion at the studio, but she turns it down in favor of starting a family with Dani. Micah and Jose are still seeing each other while Jose separates from his husband. Shane and Tess enter a poker tournament hosted by Eddie and her wife Chloe, both African American lesbians, but are soon kicked out when Chloe starts an affair with Shane, who was unaware of their relationship. Tina and Carrie decide to move their wedding date to summer in Palm Springs, and their budding relationship continues to make Bette jealous. Angie becomes more curious about her heritage from her donor, Marcus Allenwood, despite Bette and Tina having promised Marcus that he would remain anonymous, but Carrie suggests a swab test, which would reveal more of Angie's biological ancestry, which Bette and Tina agree to once Angie turns 18, though Angie appears to do one behind their back with some pushing from Jordi. Gigi continues to meddle in Alice and Nat's lives, so Alice and Shane set Bette up on a date with her to distract them both from their heartbreak, despite Bette's reluctance. Tina and Carrie appear by coincidence at the same restaurant, eliciting Bette's jealousy even more when they show their affection for each other. Gigi relates to Bette's situation following her divorce from Nat, and the two share a kiss. At Dani and Sophie's wedding, before the two can exchange vows, Finley suddenly shows up and confesses to Sophie that she loves her.
10	2	"Lean on Me"	Marja-Lewis Ryan	Jonell Lennon	August 15, 2021	0.057
Dani has stormed out of the wedding with Sophie following her, though Dani tells her she never wants to see her again and punches Finley on her way out. Maribel is upset with Sophie for cheating and not telling Dani about it, as she had promised, and tells Micah that he is the 'Finley' in his relationship with Jose, since he is still married. The next day, we see that Dani does not pick up any of Sophie's many calls, instead responding only with a video of her flushing Sophie's great grandmother's engagement ring, which Sophie had given her. Bette visits Dani, who insists that she is fine. Bette tries to sign a new artist, but he is put off by her boss which makes Bette wonder whether she made the right decision in accepting this job. She speaks about this with Gigi, and they further their relationship progresses. An editor comes to speak to Alice about her book and suggests more edits than Alice expected. Due to Shane's actions, Tess has been blackballed from working for any poker game in the city. Shane tries to start up a new poker game at Dana's with Tess as her partner, but Tess says Shane is reckless and that she doesn't want to go into business with her. Later though, they have a personal conversation in which Tess reveals that her mother has multiple sclerosis and Shane reveals that she is having a hard time financially because Quiara got half of her money in the divorce. After this, Tess agrees to run a poker night with Shane, which most of the characters attend. Alice invites Sophie to the poker game, which causes some awkwardness, but the group gets past it. Alice goes home and confronts Nat, who has been acting strange. Nat confesses that she is polyamorous and says that she and Alice will have to find a way to get past this. Dani shows up at Bette's place and finally allows herself to cry.
11	3	"Luck Be a Lady"	Marja-Lewis Ryan	Maisha Closson	August 22, 2021	0.135
It is revealed that Angie did an ancestry test, despite being told not to by Bette and Tina and that she has a half sister. She tells Jordi, who agrees to go with her to meet her half sister. Things are awkward between Alice and Nat now that Nat has slept with another woman. Micah starts a new job at Nat's therapy office. He is very excited at first but then becomes sad when Nat only gives him trans clients. He complains about this to Maribel, who tells him to speak to her about it. He does, and Nat response positively to this and gives him new clients. He then takes Maribel horse back riding to thank her for her advice after she tells a story about wanting a pony as a child. Bette and Gigi go to an art event where Gigi tries to learn more about art from Bette, and Bette finds a work of art she says is made by Pippa Pascal, an artist who disappeared many years ago after writing an article about racism in the art world. Bette introduces Dani and her father to Gigi, who acts as her realtor and helps her find an apartment, while they bond over speaking Farsi. Bette and Gigi go back home to learn that Angie did the ancestry test and found her half sister, which leads to Bette getting upset at Angie and then Gigi. Bette, along with Alice and Shane, take Angie to meet her half sister. Dani's father asks her to sign some paperwork that makes her think he is sick. Alice goes on a work dinner with her editor Tom, but arranges it so that it is at the same place as Nat's date with another woman. After seeing Nat on the date Alice decides that she cannot be polyamorous and that Nat deserves someone who can and so leaves her. Gigi takes Dani out to dinner where they bond then Gigi drives her home, revealing her name is actual Golnar, but that was too hard for Americans to pronounce. They drive to Dani's father's house, only to find it surrounded by sirens.
12	4	"Lake House"	Sarah Pia Anderson	Thomas Page McBee	August 29, 2021	0.100
It is revealed that Dani's father is being arrested. Afterwards, she disappears and Micah, who is worried about her because she has not been answering his texts, asks Sophie to look for. Sophie has already asked Finley to go to dinner with her, but agrees and finds Dani at her family's house in Ojai, where they talk and eventually sleep together again, at which point Sophie cancels on Finley, saying that she is in Ojai for work. Alice moves back to her house, where her mother has been living. She also works on her book with Tom, who asks to speak more about Dana and tells her about his experience with his brother who died. Angie speaks more with her half sister who tells her that she is like her dad and also tells her that he is dying. After some advice from Shane, Angie goes to therapy to speak about this and is helped by Micah. Micah agrees to go on a double date with a man Maribel sets him up with so that Maribel doesn't have to go on a date alone. When he comes home he finds Finley who is sad about Sophie cancelling on her after she spent so much time preparing, and reveals that Sophie is with Dani. After working closely together and bonding, Shane kisses Tess, who says that she is seeing someone. Bette tracks down Pippa Pascal and after great persistence manages to convince her to speak to her. Pippa eventually says that she does not trust Bette anymore because of who she is working for. Bette goes home and Angie asks her to do a group therapy session with Tina and Carrie.
13	5	"Lobsters, Too"	Sarah Pia Anderson	Nancy C. Mejía	September 5, 2021	0.097
During group therapy with Micah, Angie reveals that she wants to find out if she is a match to donate a kidney for her donor, which causes a fight among Bette, Tina, and Carrie. After spending the night together, Bette ignores Gigi while focusing on her work and especially Pippa Pascal instead. It is revealed that the woman Tess is seeing is Cherie Jaffe, who continuously hits on Shane. Tess tells Finley to move on from Sophie, since Sophie doesn't seem to be into her. After Nat bails on a dinner Alice had planned to try to get her back, Alice invites Tom to have the dinner with her instead, even though her book has now been published and the two decide that their relationship does not have to end with the publication of the book and that they are friends. Angie tries to speak to Jordi about the therapy session, but Jordi is more preoccupied with Prom Court. Dani spends more time with Gigi, who cancels on Bette to stay with her, and also speaks with her father, who reveals that she is now the CEO of the family company. Sophie works on a new segment for Alice's show. Micah and Maribel sleep together. Finley, taking Tess's advice, sleeps with someone she met at the bar, which Sophie sees and is hurt by. Cherie Jaffe comes to see Shane late at night.
14	6	"Love Shack"	Katrelle N. Kindred	Marja-Lewis Ryan & Lisa Quintela & Julia Hannafin	September 13, 2021	0.082
Micah reveals to Dani that he slept with Maribel, and also that Maribel has not responded to him for the past week since then. Micah convinces Dani to go to karaoke night at Dana's with him and Gigi, even though she does not want to for fear of seeing Sophie or Finley. At work, Alice talks to Sophie about possibly inviting Tom to karaoke night and Sophie tries to get out of going to karaoke night because Finley might be working there. Tess asks Finley to work karaoke night even though she had requested the night off to avoid seeing Sophie. At karaoke night, Bette, Alice and Shane sing a song, after which Gigi confronts Bette about their relationship, which they officially end, at which point Bette leaves to go to an art show to see Pippa Pascal. Tess asks Shane why Cherie broke up with her, which Shane claims to know nothing about while not mentioning that Cherie came to see her. Tess feels that Shane is not telling her something and leaves. Micah tries to talk to Maribel, who came with Sophie, but Maribel tells him she is too busy for a date in the next few days. Micah flirts with a man at the bar instead, at which point Maribel comes up to him and demands to know if she was just an experiment for Micah. Bette speaks to Pippa at the show and Pippa starts to seem willing to work with Bette. Sophie and Finley have a fight, after which Sophie sings Closer by Tegan and Sara, which is their song. When she realizes Sophie is singing to Finley, Dani leaves the bar and Gigi follows her. As they eat ice cream together, Gigi tells Dani that she have feelings for her. Sophie and Finley sleep together, and so do Tom and Alice. Shane goes to talk to Tess and admits that Cherie came over and says that Cherie is manipulative and that Shane told her to stop flirting with her and leave Tess alone.
15	7	"Light"	Rose Troche	Maisha Closson	September 20, 2021	0.054
Angie continues to ponder her decision to meet Marcus, consulting Kayla. Jordi appears uninterested, focusing more on the upcoming prom. Angie almost breaks up with her, before Jordi reveals that she was preparing a surprise for Angie to be her prom date. Alice stumbles across Gigi and Nat having brunch together, but while Alice tries to maintain her composure, she ends up having sex with Nat in her car, though they later break up again when Alice sees Nat flirting with another woman and realizes Nat will never change. Dani admits to Gigi that she was hurt by seeing Finley and Sophie together, and that she wants her as a friend for the time being. Bette pursues Pippa and manages to convince her to work for her. At a charity poker game at "Dana's", Finley approaches Dani to try and make amends, but Dani rejects her. Carrie turns up at the poker game alone, as Tina is away, and expresses her feelings to Shane that she feels isolated from the group as she cannot get along with Bette, relating to her days at school when she was bullied for being a lesbian. Shane consoles Carrie and advises her to take it slowly. Carrie approaches Bette and proposes that they try to be more civil to each other for Tina and Angie's sake, but Bette coldly and rudely rebuffs her before leaving with Pippa. Carrie becomes drunk and despondent to the point that Shane and Tess take her home, and confesses that she does not feel ready to marry Tina. Bette takes Pippa to an exhibition of an artist and they have sex. The weather becomes rainy and Shane and Tess share a kiss. Dani goes to Gigi's loft and admits that while she likes her, she does not know whether to trust her, as she has recently been with and split up from Nat, Alice and Bette. Gigi promises that it will be different and she and Dani kiss outside Gigi's loft. Sophie is very drunk and asks Finley to drive home, but it is implied that Finley has drunk more than Sophie knows about. On the way home they get stopped by sirens.
16	8	"Launch Party"	Haifaa Al-Mansour	Melody Derloshon	September 27, 2021	0.021
Sophie picks up Finley from the city jail, revealing that she had been arrested for drunk driving at the end of the last episode. She seems unconcerned about the DUI, though Sophie seems more concerned. Dani invites Bette to the CAC and tries to speak with her about Gigi, but Bette is distracted by the fact that a wing of the CAC is now named the Nunez Wing. Dani tells her that she donated to the CAC and to Bette's show as part of her work as the CEO of her family's company. Bette is upset about this and says that she can't accept Dani's family's "blood money" to fund her show. She tells the CAC she will pull Pippa's work unless they refuse Dani's family's money, angering Pippa. Bette tries to tell Pippa that she is only bluffing and that she won't allow Pippa's work to get pulled, but the CAC quickly decides to pull the show. Meanwhile, Dani sleeps with Gigi and then leaves when her father calls about Bette pulling artists from the show. Micah angrily speaks to a doctor, named Claudia, at his office about telling a patient they could go on hormone therapy even though their parents have not agreed yet. He later apologizes, revealing that a pediatrician once told him he could go on hormone therapy but his mother didn't allow him, which made him depressed and asks Claudia to dinner, which she agrees to. Elsewhere, Dani has a meeting with her father and his lawyers where he yells at her for doing too much when he had advised her to lay low. She defends herself saying that she was only trying to do something good and that her father is to blame for the state of their company and that she cannot testify for him in court at his upcoming criminal trial. Elsewhere, Alice has her book release party, attended by Bette and Shane, both of whom are alone because Tess has gone to Las Vegas to visit her mother. Also in attendance are Sophie and Finley. Sophie is concerned by Finley's drinking and eventually leaves early. Alice tells Tom that she slept with Nat, leaving him feeling hurt. He introduces her very kindly despite this and Alice reads about Dana from her book. After Alice and Shane and Bette talk and all three of them leave to woo their romantic interests. Bette talks to an associate at the CAC and starts to convince them to not remove Pippa's art, which Pippa overhears and which convinces her to forgive Bette. Alice apologizes to Tom using a quote from her book which he wrote and he forgives her and they sleep together again. Shane goes to Las Vegas where she tells Tess she would like to be there with her as her partner and they sleep together. Dani brings take-out dinner to Gigi at her office and apologizes for snapping at her earlier. She opens up about her father and says that she was embarrassed about the way she allows her father to treat her. Micah has dinner with Claudia and they kiss before Micah tells her that he has feelings for someone else. After she leaves, he calls Maribel who comes over and they tell each other that they love each other. Sophie and Finley fight at home about Finley's drinking at which point she leaves. The next morning Bette and Pippa discuss ways to show their disapproval with the acceptance of Nunez family money without ending the show and Finley is nowhere to be found and not answering Sophie's calls.
17	9	"Last Dance"	Haifaa Al-Mansour	Allie Romano	October 4, 2021	0.035
Bette and Pippa attend a protest where they have encouraged other artists to protest their work being shown in the Nunez wing. Later, Bette and Tina are sitting at the hospital with Angie waiting to meet her donor. However, Marcus's wife comes out and says that they cannot meet him today. Meanwhile, Sophie is looking for Finley who is still missing. She attends a family dinner which Micah and Maribel are also attending. She tries to hide her problems with Finley from her mother and grandmother, but Maribel tells them, at which point Sophie tells them that Micah and Maribel are dating. Meanwhile, Dani's father is upset with her about the protest and insists she find a way to deal with it. Caught up in work, Dani misses Gigi's son's event that she was supposed to attend and lies by telling Gigi she was stuck in traffic. Elsewhere, Alice is unsure about how to tell the public she is dating a man. Alice, Tess and Shane attend a pre-prom party at Bette's house where Angie is upset about her donor and distracted from prom, which leads to her and Jordi getting into a fight. Tess gets a call from Sophie and helps her look for Finley while Shane and Alice talk to Angie. Also, Tina asks Bette if she said anything that upset Carrie at the charity event the other night. Shane and Alice talk Angie into going to prom to make up with Jordi. Afterwards, Tina and Bette go to the hospital to try to talk to Marcus. While waiting Tina asks Bette if she is still in love with her, but they get cut off before she answers. Gigi and Dani make up about Dani lying about being caught in traffic and Finley shows up at her place. Dani and Gigi try to take care of her until Sophie comes to pick her up. At the hospital, Tina and Bette talk to Marcus who reveals he didn't want to talk to Angie because he felt that meeting her just before he died would not be good for her. They tell him that she understands what she is getting into and really wants to meet him, so he agrees to meet her tomorrow. However, as they leave, he dies.
18	10	"Last Call"	Marja-Lewis Ryan	Marja-Lewis Ryan & Christina Brosman	October 11, 2021	0.097
Sophie, Micah, Tess, Shane and Alice stage an intervention for Finley where they try to convince her to go to rehab for her alcoholism. She is hurt by this and refuses. Meanwhile, Bette and Pippa spend time together, but when Pippa tries to invite her to Alice's going away party, Pippa feels concerned that Bette might still have feelings for Tina, though Bette denies this. Angie is having a hard time dealing with the loss of her donor, but doesn't feel ready to go to the funeral. She speaks to Kayla who answers the questions she had about Marcus. Dani goes to her father's trial with Gigi, while they discuss attending dinner with Gigi's family later that day. After listening to a legal expert talk about what her father has done, Dani starts to feel unwell and cannot go up on the witness stand. Gigi helps her leave despite her father's lawyers telling them there could be consequences. Shane and Tess discuss Finley, who Tess says they cannot allow to keep working at the bar anymore and the fact that Tess has to move back to Las Vegas to help take care of her invalid mother and invites Shane to move with her. Alice finds a negative review about her book and is very upset by it. Alice, Shane and Bette go out to buy a wedding gift for Tina and Carrie, but Shane goes behind Tina's back and tells Bette that Carrie has cold feet, and that Bette should consider taking advantage to destroy the engagement and win Tina back, regardless of the effect it may have on Tina. After Finley lies and tries to hide her drinking, Sophie and Finley fight and Sophie goes to stay with her mother. Dani fights with her father about her testifying. At Alice's going away party, Bette goes to talk to Tina about Tina asking her if she still loves her, but as she is discussing this Carrie walks toward them with drinks and confronts them both. Carrie again tells Tina that Bette is obsessed with her and confesses that she is having a hard time measuring up to Bette, but when Tina tells Carrie that nobody expects her to, Carrie becomes offended and finally calls the engagement off. Tina then gets angry at Bette and accuses her of deliberately destroying her engagement out of spite, at which point Pippa walks in and tells Bette that she knew she was right and that Bette was not over Tina. Shane tells Tess that she cannot move from Los Angeles, but that she loves Tess. Finley gets very drunk and then goes to Sophie and tells her that she is willing to go to rehab. Dani goes to dinner with Gigi's family and while there, the police come to arrest her for not going on stand despite being subpoenaed as a witness. Alice and Tom fly out to go on Alice's tour and in the process, Alice finds an engagement ring in Tom's pocket. Bette gives Angie a painting Marcus did for Angie and tells her that she is putting on a show of Marcus's work. Angie tells Bette she should go to the CAC opening, which Bette was planning on skipping to avoid seeing Pippa. As she walks out the door, she finds Tina waiting there.

=== Season 3 (2022–23) ===
No. overall	No. in season	Title	Directed by	Written by	Original release date (Note: Each episode of the third season was released to stream on demand every Friday, ahead of its weekly Showtime on-air premiere.)	U.S. viewers (millions)
19	1	"Last Year"	Katrelle N. Kindred	Marja-Lewis Ryan	November 20, 2022	0.067
Tina asked Bette if she is in love with her, and Bette says yes. Tina, frustrated that Bette has interfered in her relationship with Carrie, admits she is in love with Bette too before leaving in tears, wishing Bette were better at being in love. One year later, at Shane’s apartment, Tess and Shane are taking care of Doris, Tess’s mom, whose dementia has progressed. Tess is organizing a fundraiser for MS. Dani and Gigi have sex in Gigi’s apartment. Dani wants to move in together, and Gigi wants to talk to Nat first. Dani is taken aback by this. Alice and Shane help Angie move into her college dorm. Alice offers Shane her glam team to help with Tess’ fundraiser. After Tina arrives, the three watch Bette arrive and promptly get rear-ended by a college student. To Tina’s surprise, Bette does not get angry. Elsewhere, Sophie frantically prepares for Finley’s return from rehab and discovers Micah’s engagement ring for Mirabel. Finley arrives and reads Sophie an amends letter, thanking her for saving her life and promising to always be honest. Back at the dorm, Bette and Tina reluctantly say goodbye to Angie. Tina asks Bette if she’s going to Tess’s fundraiser, and after she says yes, confirms she will too, despite telling Shane otherwise. At the fundraiser (at Dana’s), Micah shows Dani the ring. Dani is still upset about Gigi wanting to talk to Nat about her moving in. Mirabel expresses concern to Sophie about her relationship with Finley, calling it toxic. Shane and Tess rehire Finley. Finley tries to apologize to Dani says she doesn’t want to talk. Ivy, one of Alice’s makeup artists and a fan of her styling, flirts with Shane. Bette introduces a piece of artwork for auction that Tina recognizes from their home together and significantly upbids on the piece, rekindling a connection with Bette. The two leave together. Immediately after Shane has a flirty moment with Ivy, an unwitting Tess shows Shane the restaurant next door is for sale and that she thinks the two should buy it. Sophie and Finley play strip basketball in a park. As the two kiss, Sophie wants to go home together, but Finley needs to go to a meeting. Jordie breaks up with Angie. Micah proposed to Mirabel, who, after she says she doesn’t want to get married, that she wants to have a baby. Finley returns to bed with Sophie, whose phone buzzes with a text from Dre. At Bette’s house, Bette tells Tina about finding her mom, reckoning with how to love, and the two say today was one of the best days of their lives. They kiss and are promptly interrupted by Angie.
20	2	"Los Angeles Traffic"	Katrelle N. Kindred	Julia Hannafin	November 27, 2022	N/A
21	3	"Quiz Show"	Em Weinstein	Melody Derloshon	December 4, 2022	N/A
22	4	"Last to Know"	Em Weinstein	Marja-Lewis Ryan & Nova Cypress Black	December 11, 2022	N/A
23	5	"Locked Out"	Nancy C. Mejía	Melody Derloshon & Nina Kim	December 18, 2022	0.059
24	6	"Questions for the Universe"	Nancy C. Mejía	Alison Wong	December 25, 2022	N/A
25	7	"Little Boxes"	Em Weinstein	María Renée Prudencio	January 1, 2023	N/A
26	8	"Quality Family Time"	Em Weinstein	Allie Romano	January 8, 2023	N/A
27	9	"Quiet Before the Storm"	Kate Moennig	Melody Derloshon	January 15, 2023	N/A
28	10	"Looking Ahead"	Leisha Hailey	Marja-Lewis Ryan & Courtney Edwards & Scout Comm	January 22, 2023	N/A

== Production ==
=== Development ===
A sequel to The L Word was confirmed to be in development by Showtime on July 11, 2017. Marja-Lewis Ryan was confirmed as showrunner and executive producer on November 20, 2017; original L Word series creator and showrunner Ilene Chaiken will serve as executive producer, with Jennifer Beals, Katherine Moennig, and Leisha Hailey also serving as executive producers. The L Word: Generation Q will consist of eight episodes.

In anticipation of the show, several LGBTQIA outlets have created special programming, such as Autostraddle's podcast To L & Back: An L Word Podcast; two episodes of RuPaul's podcast, RuPaul: What's the Tee? (one of which is a conversation with L Word producer and cast member Kate Moennig); an episode of Margaret Cho's podcast, The Margaret Cho, featuring comedian Fortune Feimster who will appear in The L Word as a guest star; and Cameron Esposito's podcast, Queery, in which she interviews original L Word creator Ilene Chaiken .

On January 13, 2020, the series was renewed for a second season. Due to the COVID-19 pandemic, filming for the second season was delayed for several months and was originally expected to premiere in late 2020. Production for the second season finally began in December 2020. On February 4, 2022, Showtime renewed the series for a 10-episode third season which is expected to premiere later this year. Production for the third season began on June 9, 2022. On March 23, 2023, Showtime canceled the series after three seasons. A reboot of the original series set in New York was reported to be in development with Chaiken attached to it. On April 4, 2023, it was reported that the series was removed from Showtime platforms following the cancellation. Kate Moennig and Leisha Hailey addressed the reboot news in July 2024, saying they were unaware of any such development.

=== Casting ===
Jennifer Beals, Katherine Moennig, and Leisha Hailey reprised their roles from the original series. Bette and Tina's daughter Angelica, depicted as an infant in the original series, was portrayed as a teenager by Jordan Hull. Sarah Shahi stated that she would reprise her role as Carmen de la Pica Morales, though Showtime did not officially confirm her involvement, and Shahi ultimately did not appear in the series. Pam Grier stated that she would not reprise her role as Kit Porter due to shooting conflicts with the ABC series Bless This Mess. Kit was subsequently written out of the series as having died of a drug overdose.

Ryan stated that she wished to introduce new characters to the series in order to have it "live on in a different space." Arienne Mandi, Leo Sheng, Jacqueline Toboni, and Rosanny Zayas were confirmed as series regulars on June 24, 2019, and Sepideh Moafi was confirmed as a series regular on August 2, 2019. Brian Michael Smith and Stephanie Allynne were confirmed for recurring guests on June 27, 2019. Olivia Thirlby, Fortune Feimster, Lex Scott Davis, and Sophie Giannamore were confirmed for guest roles on July 23, 2019, while Freddy Miyares, Jamie Clayton, and Carlos Leal were confirmed for recurring roles on July 31, 2019. On December 2, 2019, Jillian Mercado was cast in a recurring role. Laurel Holloman returning as Tina Kennard was teased during the series' promotion but not confirmed until the sixth episode aired; her appearance was revealed before the episode's opening credits.

On December 9, 2020, for the second season, Jordan Hull was promoted to a series regular while Rosie O'Donnell, Donald Faison, and Griffin Dunne were cast to guest star as Carrie, Tom Maultsby and Isaac Zakarian, respectively. Anne Archer and Rosanna Arquette also returned from the original series to reprise their roles as Lenore Pieszecki and Cherie Jaffe, respectively. On July 27, 2022, Kehlani announced that they are set to guest star for the third season. On August 8, 2022, Margaret Cho, Joey Lauren Adams, and Joanna Cassidy were cast to guest star while Clayton was promoted to a series regular for the third season. On September 21, 2022, Fletcher announced that she is set to guest star for the third season.

=== Filming ===
The L Word: Generation Q utilized recognizable Los Angeles buildings such as the Millenium Biltmore Hotel and The Semi-Tropic. It also used outdoor locations such as Silver Lake Reservoir.

== Broadcast ==
The L Word: Generation Q premiered on December 8, 2019, on Showtime. The UK television premiere was on Sky Atlantic on February 4, 2020 The first episode of the second season debuted on August 6, 2021, on streaming and on-demand for Showtime subscribers, ahead of its Showtime premiere on August 8, 2021. Each episode of the second season was released to stream on demand every Friday, ahead of its weekly Showtime on-air premiere. The third season premiered on November 20, 2022, with a new episode available to stream on demand every Friday for Showtime subscribers, ahead of its weekly Showtime on-air premiere.

== Reception ==
=== Critical response ===
On review aggregator Rotten Tomatoes, the series holds an approval rating of 81% based on 31 reviews, with an average rating of 6.9/10. The website's critical consensus reads, "Though at times Generation Q doesn't quite stand on its own, it has style and charm to spare and announces a new phase for The L Word that will please new and old fans alike. On Metacritic, it has a weighted average score of 60 out of 100, based on 13 critics, indicating "mixed or average reviews".

The second season, however, was met with a more polarized response, particularly for its narrative, heavy reliance on throwbacks to the original series, and its negative stereotypes regarding bisexual relationships, butch women and transgender people. The Los Angeles Times put particular emphasis on Carrie, the series' first clear butch character who was portrayed as an overweight, self-loathing, insecure woman easily intimidated by Bette (who was described as exhibiting "snooty behavior" with numerous traits consistent with narcissistic personality disorder and emotional insecurity when near both Tina and Carrie), and Finley, who was depicted as overly carefree to the point of being constantly drunk and potentially dangerous to be around. Bree Tomas voiced her defense for the butch community, particularly Rosie O'Donnell, who after being cast as Carrie was subjected to online abuse, fat shaming and negative comparisons to Jennifer Beals on social media by fans of the series, which was widely condemned by critics. According to Showbiz Cheat Sheet, following the airing of the second-season finale, which saw the end of both Bette and Pippa's relationship and Tina and Carrie's engagement due to Bette's actions and behavior, and ended with a cliffhanger that teased a third reunion between Bette and Tina, fans expressed their displeasure with Bette and Tina's storyline, labelling it as too repetitive and "out of line", and took to Twitter with the hashtag "IleneSavetheLWord". Ilene Chaiken, the creator and showrunner of the original series who herself had come under heavy criticism for reinforcing negative lesbian stereotypes, responded by praising Ryan's work and defending her decision to give Ryan full creative control.

Season 3 was met with an overwhelmingly negative reception. Following the airing of the second episode, which saw Bette and Tina's third and final reunion, Ryan gave an interview regarding Bette and Tina's relationship. Though Ryan had previously stated during the first season that she wanted to take storylines in different directions, Ryan recanted her statement in the interview and said that her intention had always been to build up towards a wedding between Bette and Tina, revealing that following the first season and the revelation of Tina's engagement to Carrie and Bette's dinner date with Maya, she was harassed with direct messages on social media demanding that she reunite Bette and Tina "or else". The interview was met with both praise and backlash from fans, with some accusing Ryan of lying and deliberately choosing predictable and unrealistic fan service over creativity, and comparing the one year time skip between the second and third seasons to that between Star Wars: The Last Jedi and Star Wars: The Rise of Skywalker which left numerous season 2 cliffhangers unresolved, such as Dani's arrest and Tom's planned proposal to Alice, and the circumstances of Bette and Tina's renewed friendship unexplained other than Bette going offscreen on another buddhist retreat and claiming to have changed for good, which was met with harsh criticism and accusations of downplaying Bette's behavior and its effects on her relationship with Tina. Fans were also critical of Pippa Pascal's role in the overall story, with some accusing Ryan of using Pippa, Bette's first serious African-American lover, merely as a token to change Bette's personality and make her more compatible with the Caucasian Tina, a decision which was perceived as racist, and Pippa's subsequent appearance at Bette and Tina's wedding was brought under question. The unresolved fates of Gigi and Tess were also met with criticism, and Bette and Tina's wedding was described as "anticlimactic" and "forced", given that Bette and Tina received far less screen time than the wedding guests. The return of past characters such as Max Sweeney, Tasha Williams and Dana Fairbanks, however, was met with some praise, with particular focus given to Max, who was depicted as being in a relationship with a fellow trans character and raising four children, and his interactions with Micah were cited as one of the season's highlights.

=== Ratings ===
==== Season 1 ====
Viewership and ratings per episode of The L Word: Generation Q
No.	Title	Air date	Rating (18–49)	Viewers (millions)	DVR viewers (millions)	Total viewers (millions)
1	"Let's Do It Again"	December 8, 2019	0.05	0.241	0.111	0.352 (Note: Live+7 ratings were unavailable, so Live+3 ratings have been used instead.)
2	"Less Is More"	December 15, 2019	0.05	0.236	0.112	0.348
3	"Lost Love"	December 22, 2019	0.05	0.248	—N/a	—N/a
4	"LA Times"	December 29, 2019	0.04	0.226	0.132	0.358
5	"Labels"	January 5, 2020	0.03	0.171	0.131	0.302
6	"Loose Ends"	January 12, 2020	0.05	0.207	0.150	0.357
7	"Lose It All"	January 19, 2020	0.05	0.241	0.141	0.382
8	"Lapse in Judgement"	January 26, 2020	0.06	0.218	0.103	0.321

==== Season 2 ====
Viewership and ratings per episode of The L Word: Generation Q
No.	Title	Air date	Rating (18–49)	Viewers (millions)	DVR viewers (millions)	Total viewers (millions)
1	"Late to the Party"	August 8, 2021	0.01	0.118	—N/a	—N/a
2	"Lean on Me"	August 15, 2021	0.01	0.057	0.095	0.152
3	"Luck Be a Lady"	August 22, 2021	0.01	0.135	0.099	0.234
4	"Lake House"	August 29, 2021	0.01	0.100	—N/a	—N/a
5	"Lobsters, Too"	September 5, 2021	0.01	0.097	—N/a	—N/a
6	"Love Shack"	September 13, 2021	0.01	0.082	—N/a	—N/a
7	"Light"	September 20, 2021	0.01	0.054	—N/a	—N/a
8	"Launch Party"	September 27, 2021	0.01	0.021	—N/a	—N/a
9	"Last Dance"	October 4, 2021	0.01	0.035	—N/a	—N/a
10	"Last Call"	October 11, 2021	0.04	0.097	0.134	0.231

==== Season 3 ====
Viewership and ratings per episode of The L Word: Generation Q
No.	Title	Air date	Rating (18–49)	Viewers (millions)	DVR viewers (millions)	Total viewers (millions)
1	"Last Year"	November 20, 2022	0.01	0.067	—N/a	—N/a
5	"Locked Out"	December 18, 2022	0.01	0.059	—N/a	—N/a

=== Accolades ===
The L Word: Generation Q was nominated for the Outstanding Drama Series category for the 33rd GLAAD Media Awards in 2022.
