= Music Video (TV series) =

Australian music television show (1983–1987)

Music Video was an Australian music television show broadcast by Channel 10. It broadcast from around Midnight until dawn on Friday and Saturday nights. It was originally produced and hosted by John Torv. Basia Bonkowski took over as host in June 1985 with her first weekend being co host with Torv. The series played music video clips covering a wide range of genres. The series began in May 1983 and was axed in January 1984 but was reinstated 9 weeks later after feedback from the audience.

== See also ==
- List of Australian music television shows
- List of Australian television series
