= Jillian Mercado =

American actress and model

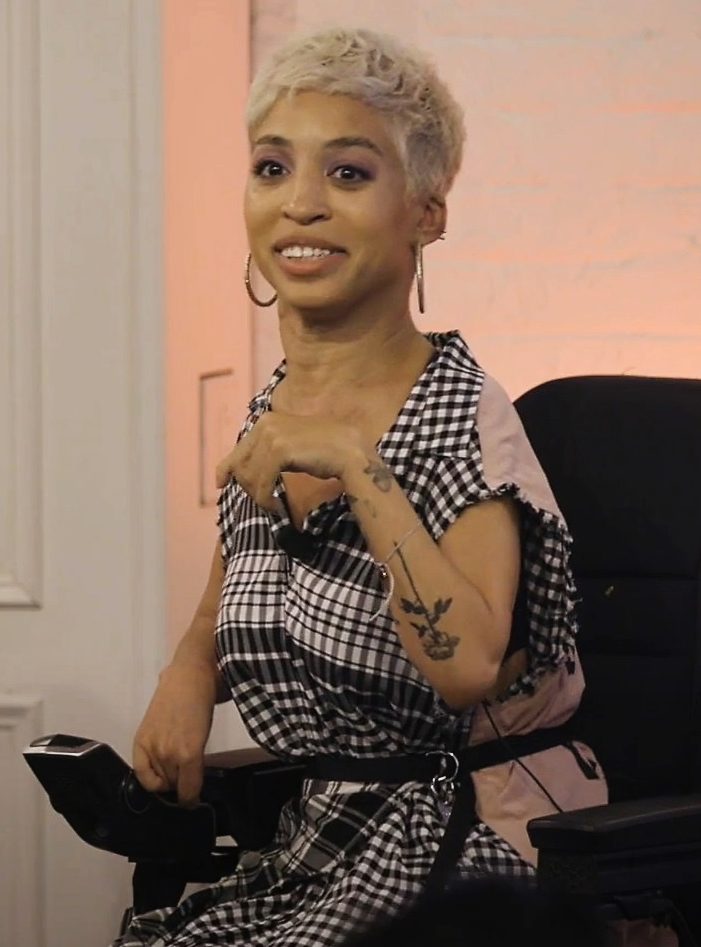
- Mercado interviewed by Adweek in 2020
- Born: April 30, 1987 (age 39); New York City, New York, U.S.
- Occupations: Model, actress and activist
- Years active: 2014–present
- Modeling information
- Height: 5 ft 2 in (1.57 m)
- Hair color: Blonde
- Eye color: Brown
- Agency: CAA (Los Angeles)
- Website: www.manufactured1987.com

Jillian Mercado (born April 30, 1987) is an American actress and fashion model represented by CAA (Los Angeles). As a wheelchair user (due to muscular dystrophy), she is one of the few professional models who has a visible physical disability in the fashion industry. A prominent figure in the new wave of models challenging beauty ideals in the fashion industry, Mercado is keen to fight the lack of representation of people with disabilities in the fashion industry and their enduring stigma.

== Early life ==
Mercado was born and raised in New York, NY. She is of Dominican ancestry, and has two younger sisters. Diagnosed with spastic muscular dystrophy as a child, she believes her interest in fashion originated from her mother, a dressmaker, and her father, once a shoe salesman. As a fashion merchandising student at New York's Fashion Institute of Technology from 2006 to 2010, she completed internships at Veranda and Allure magazine. She would continue on to attending Fashion Week for years as a volunteer which ultimately gave her the opportunity to cover events for society photographer Patrick McMullan's PMc Magazine.

== Career ==
In 2014, Mercado featured in her first campaign, for designer denim brand Diesel, which she was selected by Nicola Formichetti. Its success captured the attention of IMG Models President Ivan Bart and landed her a modelling contract with IMG in August 2015. She has since starred in several campaigns for Nordstrom as well as in former Vogue Paris editor Carine Roitfeld's CR Fashion Book where she was photographed by Michael Avedon. Jillian is currently represented by CAA Worldwide.

In March 2016, Mercado was announced as one of three models to appear in the latest campaign for Beyoncé's official website, promoting merchandise for the singer's new single and 2016 Formation world tour. Later that spring, she was featured in a Target Corporation marketing campaign that debuted during Telemundo's Billboard Latin Music Awards. In September 2016, Mercado appeared in the editorial features of Glamour and Cosmopolitan. By the end of that year, Mercado appeared on her first cover for Posture Magazine.

In February 2017, Mercado appeared in an editorial for Galore magazine.

In 2019, Jillian Mercado started to play Maribel on The L Word: Generation Q. In 2022, she played the lead character of Sonya in the short film My Eyes Are Up Here.

== Personal life ==
Mercado identifies as queer.
