= Em Weinstein =

American television writer and director

Emil Weinstein
- Born: 1990/1991 (age 34–35)
- Education: Yale School of Drama
- Occupations: Television writer and director
- Years active: 2018-present
- Notable work: Becoming Eve; Candace
- Spouse: Alix Masters (married 2024-present)
- Awards: L.A. Outfest 2020 In France Michelle is a Man's Name – Outstanding U.S Narrative Short; The America Pavilion Emerging Filmmakers Showcase 2018 Candace – LGBTQ Showcase Best Short Film
- Website: https://emweinstein.com/

Em (or Emil) Weinstein is an American television writer and director who also works in film and theater. They directed episodes of The L Word: Generation Q, and A League of Their Own. Weinstein has made several short films which have shown at festivals, and on Showtime's Spotlights series. Their work focuses on queer themes and stories.

Weinstein has degrees from Smith College and Yale School of Drama. As a student at Yale School of Drama, they directed the first workshop production of Slave Play by Jeremy O. Harris.

Weinstein's 2018 short, "Candace", won the Best Film at the American Pavilion at the Cannes Film Festival. Another Weinstein's short, "In France, Michelle is a Man's Name", won the Grand Jury Prize at Outfest. "In France..." also won the Grand Jury Prize for Best Narrative Short at Slamdance, 2021, and was nominated for a NewFilmmakers Los Angeles award in 2022. The film was awarded Best US Short at The San Diego International Film Festival.
