= Kulture Shock =

Australian music television show (1985)

Kulture Shock was an Australian music television show broadcast by SBS. It was created as a replacement for Rock Around the World It was hosted by Geeling, Tony Hughes and Oriana Panozzo. It was a music magazine style show with video clips, interviews and magazine pieces and took a lot of its content from Britain's The Tube.

== See also ==
- List of Australian music television shows
- List of Australian television series
