= Marja-Lewis Ryan =

American screenwriter

- Born: March 19, 1985 (age 41); Brooklyn, New York
- Education: Tisch School of the Arts
- Occupations: Writer, director, producer, and actress
- Writing career
- Notable work: The Four-Faced Liar

Marja-Lewis Ryan (born March 19, 1985) is an American writer, director, producer, and actress. She is best known for writing, co-starring, and co-producing the LGBT drama film, The Four-Faced Liar, which won multiple awards, including Outstanding First Narrative Feature at L.A. Outfest. She is the executive producer and showrunner for the sequel to The L Word, called The L Word: Generation Q, which premiered in December 2019.

== Early life ==
Ryan was born in Brooklyn, New York. She received an honors BFA from NYU's Tisch School of the Arts where she studied at The Atlantic Theatre Company's Acting School.

== Career ==
In an interview, she described her interest in writing as stemming from her time at NYU. She and her friends figured that "you have to make your own work." And so she wrote her first script for them to workshop as actors. As for her thematic interests, she recounts what happened after The Four-Faced Liar got released: "I had the opportunity to go into meetings with crazy big people. The one question that came up repeatedly was 'what kind of work do you want to do for the rest of your life?' The first time someone asked me that, I answered it so truthfully that I shocked myself. I said, 'I just want to write dark comedies for women that don't ostracize a male audience.'"

In the early 2000s, she was a member of a theater company in Los Angeles, Theater of NOTE, where she received positive critical reviews as a writer and director.

She wrote, co-starred, and co-produced The Four-Faced Liar in 2010. Ryan received the Maverick Award from the Los Angeles Women's Theatre Festival in 2016.

She wrote and directed the film 6 Balloons, released in March 2018, and is drafting the reboot of Splash starring Channing Tatum and Jillian Bell.

Ryan is the executive producer and the showrunner for The L Word: Generation Q , the sequel to The L Word, currently in its 3rd season. Showtime. More recently, she signed a deal with the Showtime network.

== Personal life ==
Ryan is an out lesbian.

== See also ==
- List of female film and television directors
- List of lesbian filmmakers
- List of LGBT-related films directed by women
