= The Four-Faced Liar =

2010 film by Jacob Chase

- Film poster
- Directed by: Jacob Chase
- Written by: Marja-Lewis Ryan
- Based on: The Four-Faced Liar by Marja-Lewis Ryan
- Produced by: Daniel Carlisle; Samantha Housman; Todd Kubrak; Emily Peck
- Starring: Marja Lewis Ryan; Emily Peck; Todd Kubrak; Daniel Carlisle; Liz Osborn
- Cinematography: Danny Grunes
- Edited by: Jacob Chase
- Music by: Jane Antonia Cornish
- Release date: January 2010
- Running time: 87 minutes
- Country: United States
- Language: English

The Four-Faced Liar is a 2010 comedy-drama-romance film directed by Jacob Chase. The title is a reference to a four-faced clock that displays four different times, all wrong, and to a bar with that name (also named after the clock) that features prominently as a location in the film.

== Plot ==
Set in New York City spanning several months, Greg has just moved in with his girlfriend Molly. During their first night after unpacking, they go out for drinks and a meal at a local bar, called The Four-Faced Liar. There, they meet Trip, his girlfriend Chloe (Liz Osborn), and his lesbian friend Bridget. Molly and Bridget bond as they discuss Wuthering Heights and relationships. Molly tells Bridget that she has everything in common with her boyfriend, but Greg lacks passion. Bridget tells Molly that she doesn't have a girlfriend because no one can hold her interest for long enough to bother. Bridget is roommates with Trip, and they always wake at the same time every morning and they both brush their teeth together in front of the bathroom mirror.

Trip and Greg bond over beers and smoking joints on the roof of Trip's apartment building. Trip shows concern with Greg over Molly spending more and more time with Bridget, and he reminds Greg that Bridget is a lesbian. Greg tells Trip that he is getting worked up for nothing.

Around Halloween, Trip annoys Chloe by skipping a ballet performance to watch sports. Chloe takes Bridget in Trip's place to watch the show. However, Trip wins Chloe back with a candlelit apology, her favorite dessert, and a self-deprecating dance.

After coming home from the holidays early, Chloe catches Trip having sex with a random girl and she leaves him. That same night, Greg drunkenly tries to force an uninterested Molly into sex. She leaves him to stay with Bridget until he apologizes, which he does the next day.

At a New Year's Eve party at the bar, Molly laments to Bridget that she has never been thrown up against a wall and kissed. In the restroom, Bridget does just that when she follows Molly in, and the pair has breathless sex for the first time. Afterward, Molly and Bridget appear shocked by their own actions; Bridget asks Molly to come home with her, but Molly rejects her. Molly heads out to be with Greg. Later that night, Molly follows Bridget home after putting Greg to bed and starts a secret affair with Bridget. A montage is shown as Molly's bond with Bridget grows during the next several weeks. One morning, Chloe enters Bridget's room to gather some stuff and finds naked Molly in bed with her. Chloe expresses her disapproval and disappointment with Molly and her infidelity. Trip briefly enters the room but quickly left in shock. And after finding out what went on between Molly and Bridget, he reports it to Greg, who takes the news calmly and forgives his girlfriend because "she's worth it." Molly then breaks off her romance with Bridget and announces that she is marrying Greg.

A few days later at Molly's birthday party at the bar, Trip attempts to woo Chloe back, while Bridget shows up and presents her case to Molly with a simple, "I like you." Greg sees Bridget outside the bar and he confronts her by asking how she pleases Molly in bed better than he. The angry and jealous Greg finally loses his temper and throws Bridget up against a car over her presence at the party. When Chloe and Molly realize that both Greg and Bridget are missing, they all run outside where Trip pulls Greg off of Bridget who wanders off while Chloe follows and tries to comfort her.

Molly ends her engagement with Greg, who moves out and back to his hometown.

Molly then visits Bridget to report Greg leaving her, and both women lie in bed side by side, staring at the ceiling. The camera pans in to a tight shot of them together. Bridget turns to Molly and says “you keep me completely interested.” She then questions the look on Molly's face, and Molly responds, “It means I love you.” “Oh,” Bridget responds. Both women turn to face the ceiling. Molly breaths out and says, “So.” Bridget says, “So.”

== Cast ==
- Emily Peck as Molly
- Marja-Lewis Ryan as Bridget
- Daniel Carlisle as Greg
- Todd Kubrak as Trip
- Liz Osborn as Chloe
- Lisa Bierman as Amy
- Tadia K. Taylor as Dorothy
- Jessie Paddock as Tracy
- Natasha David as Jenna

== Reception ==
Winner of 2010 HBO Audience Award for Best First Feature Film (Outfest), Winner of 2010 Roger Walker-Dack award for Emerging Artist (Marja-Lewis Ryan),

Official Selection: Slamdance Film Festival, Newport Beach International Film Festival, Ashland Independent Film Festival, Miami Gay and Lesbian Film Festival, Toronto Gay and Lesbian Film Festival, Provincetown Film festival, deadCenter Film Festival, Pink Apple Film Festival, New York LGBT Film Festival, Frameline, Tokyo LGBT Film Festival, Outfest, Philadelphia QFest, North Carolina LGBT Film Festival, and Atlanta Film Festival.

== Distribution and home media ==
MTV/Viacom/Logo owns the broadcast rights. Wolfe Media owns the North American DVD/VOD rights. Multivisionaire is the film's foreign sales agent. TLA owns the UK rights.

== See also ==
List of lesbian filmmakers
