= The Big Byte =

Australian lifestyle television show (1994)

The Big Byte is an Australian magazine style television show, focused on computers, broadcast by the SBS. Broadcast from 24 March 1994 it was hosted by Basia Bonkowski. Also featured were reporters Phil Keoghan, Maeve O'Meara and Simon Nasht and game reviewer Hayden Topperwien.

Mark Lawrence of the Age about what audience it was aiming for writing "But as broad as their intended canvas might be, the show appears weighted heavily in favor if the computer novice. Nothing will surprise anyone who reads about and uses computers at anything above a superficial level." Philippa Hawker, also of the Age, expresses a similar concern noting "it's very unsure about where to pitch itself."

== See also ==
- List of Australian television series
