= Carmen LoBue =

Filmmaker

Carmen LoBue is a non-binary filmmaker, playwright, and actor.

== Career ==
LoBue was named by Paper Mag as one of "100 People Taking Over 2019". They were featured in a Playbill write up of "Queer Black Playwrights to Know and Support". They were widely praised for directing the award-winning short film, Pink and Blue, about transgender parents of color, representing identities rarely featured in film. In 2022, they were a finalist for New York Stage and Film's Founders' Award. In 2023, they appeared on Slice's list of "10 Young Black Transgender and Nonbinary Celebs Whose Careers are on the Rise". LoBue was cast in the third season of The L Word: Generation Q as Dre, appearing in five episodes.

== Personal life ==
LoBue is Afro-Filipinx and queer.

LoBue is a survivor of sexual violence and has used filmmaking and community building amongst fellow Black queer people to heal from their trauma.

== Productions ==
Films
| Title | Year | Venue | Source |
|---|---|---|---|
| Splinters | 2014 | Miami Gay and Lesbian Film Festival | |
| HERassment | 2018 | The Legacy Lab | |
| Cheer Up Charlie | 2019 | Hollyshorts | |
| O, Ryan | 2019 | Letterboxd | |
| Will You... Hold My Hair Back? | 2020 | Pride Plays | |
| Pink and Blue | 2021 | Asian American International Film Festival | |
| Your Attention Please: Tao Leigh Goffe | 2022 | Hulu | |

Television shows
| Title | Year | Network | Source |
|---|---|---|---|
| The L Word: Generation Q | 2022 – 2023 | Showtime | |
