= Lego Masters (Australian TV series) season 5 =

Lego Masters
- Season 5
- Hosted by: Hamish Blake
- Judges: Ryan "The Brickman" McNaught
- No. of teams: 8
- Location: Sydney, Australia

Release
- Original network: Nine Network
- Original release: 10 April – 8 May 2023

Season chronology
- ← Previous; Season 4 Next → Season 6

The fifth season of Australian reality television series Lego Masters, titled Lego Masters: Grand Masters, began airing on 10 April 2023. Unlike previous series’, eight teams returned from previous seasons to compete. Hamish Blake returned as host along with Ryan "The Brickman" McNaught as judge. The eight teams battle it out to win the title of Australia's LEGO Master and a prize of $100,000.

== Production ==
In September 2022, the series was renewed by Nine for a fifth, “All-stars” season, titled Lego Masters: Grand Masters, which had returning contestants from each previous season. The contestants were announced on 28 March 2023 and premiered on 10 April 2023.

== Teams ==
Team	Relationship	Previous season	Status
Scott & Owen	Best friends	Season 3 runners-up	Winners
Joss & Henry Woodyard	Brothers	Season 4 winners	Runners up
Alex & Caleb Campion	Law student & Makeup artist	Season 4 runners-up	Eliminated (Challenge 14)
Ryan & Gabby	Primary School teacher & occupational therapist	Season 3 grand finalists	Eliminated (Challenge 13)
Andrew & Damian	Best mates	Season 2 runners-up	Eliminated (Challenge 12)
David Velásquez & Gus McLaren	Mates	Season 3 winners	Eliminated (Challenge 10)
Henry & Sarah	Paired together	Season 1 winner & Season 3	Eliminated (Challenge 7)
Kale & Trent	Paired together	Season 1 & Season 2 last eliminatees	Eliminated (Challenge 4)

== Elimination history ==
Teams' progress through the competition
Team	Challenge													
Team	1	2	3	4	5	6	7	8	9	10	11	12	13	GF
Scott & Owen	Top One	Safe	Top One	Immunity	Safe	Top Two	Safe	Safe	Top One	Top One	Immunity	Top One	Safe	Winners
Joss & Henry	Safe	Safe	Safe	Top One	Top One	Immunity	Safe	Top Two	Safe	Top Two	Top One	Immunity	Top Two	Runners up
Alex & Caleb	Safe	Safe	Safe	Safe	Top Two	Safe	Safe	Safe	Safe	Safe	Top Two	Safe	Top One	Eliminated
Ryan & Gabby	Safe	Top One	Safe	Safe	Safe	Safe	Top Two	Safe	Top Two	Safe	Safe	Safe	Eliminated	
Andrew & Damian	Safe	Safe	Safe	Safe	Safe	Top One	Immunity	Safe	Safe	Safe	Safe	Eliminated		
David & Gus	Safe	Safe	Safe	Safe	Safe	Safe	Top One	Top One	Immunity	Eliminated				
Henry & Sarah	Safe	Safe	Safe	Top Two	Safe	Safe	Eliminated							
Kale & Trent	Safe	Safe	Safe	Eliminated										

Table key
Advantage	Team received an advantage from Brickman
Top One	Team came first place in the challenge or the show
Immunity	Team is immune and safe from elimination
Safe	Team was safe from elimination after passing a challenge/round.
Eliminated	Team was eliminated from the competition

=== Team scores ===
Teams' scores during the first three builds
Team	Challenge score (out of 20)			Running total
Team	1	2	3	Running total
Scott & Owen	18	17	19 (+3)	57
Ryan & Gabby	17	18	17	52
Andrew & Damian	16	14	18 (+3)	51
Kale & Trent	14	17	16 (+3)	50
David & Gus	17	16	16	49
Joss & Henry	16	15	18	49
Henry & Sarah	15	15	16 (+3)	49
Alex & Caleb	14	16	16 (+3)	49

== Series Details ==
=== Challenge 1 ===
- Airdate - 10 April 2023
- Challenge: "City In The Sky" Each of the eight teams has 14 hours to create a model of a world / civilisation on a disk hung by a single cable from the ceiling.
- Advantage: Each of the first three builds will be scored out of 20 points by Brickman in order to determine the winner of the immunity brick.

Team	Lego Design	Score	Result
Scott & Owen	Mine on an Asteroid	18	Won
David & Gus	Space Monkeys! (Crashed Rocket)	17	Safe
Ryan & Gabby	Viking Tree of Life (Yggdrasil)	17	Safe
Joss & Henry	Lighthouse Shipyard (Steampunk Space Pirates)	16	Safe
Andrew & Damian	The Sky Resort	16	Safe
Henry & Sarah	Shipping Containder City Attack (Monster)	15	Safe
Caleb & Alex	The Love Robot (Cherubs)	14	Safe
Kale & Trent	Phoenix Egg Heist (Wizards)	14	Safe

=== Challenge 2 ===
- Airdate - 11 April 2023
- Challenge: "Over the Falls" Each of the eight teams has six hours to create a build which tells a story both as it goes over the edge of a waterfall, and as it crashes on the rocks below.
- Advantage: Each team will receive another score out of 20 by Brickman in order to determine the winner of the immunity brick.

Team	Lego Design	Score	Result
Ryan & Gabby	Monkey in a Barrel (with Bananas)	18	Won
Scott & Owen	Safety Turtle (Hang Gliding with Floaties)	17	Safe
Kale & Trent	Magician and His Assistant (in a Barrel)	17	Safe
Caleb & Alex	Treasure Hunter (Water Skiing on Two Crocodiles)	16	Safe
David & Gus	Fat Cat (On a Raft)	16	Safe
Joss & Henry	Koi Fisherman	15	Safe
Henry & Sarah	Pirate Rubber Duckie Ship	15	Safe
Andrew & Damian	Adrenaline Junkie (Skysurfing)	14	Safe

=== Challenge 3 ===
- Airdate - 12 April 2023
- Challenge: "Greatest Lego Mystery: Real or Lego?" Each of the eight teams has 10 hours to recreate a real-world item from the "Blake & Brickman Detective Agency" set piece (an office full of Film noir items). Each team chooses one real item and the Lego item will replace it. A guest judge, Sophie Monk, has one minute to decide which items are real and which are Lego while examining the set from a distance. An extra three points are available if the guest judge is fooled.
- Advantage: Each team will receive another score out of 20 by Brickman, more points available for more difficult items, and the team with the highest score over the first three builds will receive the immunity brick, The Grand Brick.

Team	Lego Design	Score	Fooled Guest Judge	Result
Scott & Owen	Electric Fan	19 (+3)	Yes	Won
Andrew & Damian	Typewriter	18 (+3)	Yes	Safe
Henry & Sarah	Hatstand	16 (+3)	Yes	Safe
Caleb & Alex	Books and Candlestick Telephone Bookends	16 (+3)	Yes	Safe
Kale & Trent	1940s Tabletop Radio	16 (+3)	Yes	Safe
Joss & Henry	Tiffany Lamp	18	No	Safe
Ryan & Gabby	Mantel Clock	17	No	Safe
David & Gus	Reel to Reel Tape Recorder	16	No	Safe

=== Challenge 4 ===
- Airdate - 16 April 2023
- Advantage Challenge "Roller Coaster Car": The first elimination challenge sees the contestants complete a two-part Theme Park challenge. In the first part, each of the eight teams has two hours, to construct a roller coaster car. In order to gain the advantage in the second part, the car must travel successfully around a roller coaster track. The winner of the advantage challenge choose their lot for the elimination challenge and the lots for all the other teams.
- Elimination Challenge "Theme Park": The eight teams have 12 hours to complete one section of the theme park all linked by the roller coaster track. The team that won the advantage have their cart equipped with a camera to tour the entire theme park. The challenge is judged both from the aesthetics and construction as viewed from the outside and the point of view of a camera attached to the roller coaster.

Team	Lego Design	Result
Advantage Challenge
Joss & Henry	Skull	Advantage - Successful
David & Gus	Crazy Clown	Successful (lost lower jaw)
Scott & Owen	Spinning Teacup	Crashed
Andrew & Damian	Rocket Snail	Crashed
Henry & Sarah	V8 Flaming Snail	Crashed
Caleb & Alex	Burger	Crashed
Kale & Trent	Princess Pirate Ship	Crashed
Ryan & Gabby	Egyptian Sarcophagus	Crashed
Elimination Challenge
Joss & Henry	Spooky Land	Winner
Henry & Sarah	Zombies	Top Two
Scott & Owen	Pirates of Skull Mountain	Immunity
Andrew & Damian	Temple Raiders (Aztec World)	Safe
Caleb & Alex	Dinosaurs	Safe
Ryan & Gabby	Big Stuff	Safe
David & Gus	Clown Town	Bottom Two
Kale & Trent	Superheroes	Eliminated

=== Challenge 5 ===
- Airdate - 17 April 2023
- Challenge "Up it Goes": The teams have 7 hours to create a single build that travels vertically up a wire for 6 metres.
- Advantage: The teams were not told if the build was an elimination build, the Grand Brick is passed to the new winner.

Team	Lego Design	Height	Result
Joss & Henry	When Pigs Fly	6m	Winner
Caleb & Alex	Climb Cat (Cat Burglar / Angel Crime Cat)	6m	Top Two
Scott & Owen	Hot Air Balloon	6m	Safe
Henry & Sarah	Window Washer	6m	Safe
Ryan & Gabby	Retro Rocket	6m	Safe
David & Gus	Owl	2m	Bottom Two
Andrew & Damian	Rocket Man	1.5m	Bottom Two

=== Challenge 6 ===
- Airdate - 18 April 2023
- Challenge "Conspiracy Theories": The teams have 10 hours to create a story about a well-known secret trope, mystery, or conspiracy theory out of Lego. The build will be boxed in a wooden crate and revealed for judging. Dr Karl appears as a special guest.
- Advantage: The teams were not told if the build was an elimination build, the Grand Brick is passed to the new winner.

Team	Lego Design	Result
Andrew & Damian	Jacked Rat (Mutant)	Winner
Scott & Owen	El Dorado, The City of Gold	Top Two
David & Gus	Alien in a Canister	Safe
Caleb & Alex	Surprised Bigfoot	Safe
Ryan & Gabby	President Controlled by Mice	Safe
Joss & Henry	Loch Ness Monster Workshop	Immunity
Henry & Sarah	Yeti (Man in a Suit)	Bottom Two

=== Challenge 7 ===
- Airdate - 23 April 2023
- Advantage Challenge "Space": The seven teams have three hours to build something that makes sense on the top of a rocket, weighs no more than 350g, and tells a story as it returns to earth on a parachute. Each build is judged out of 10 points by Brickman and a bonus point for "flair" is awarded by Hamish Blake. NPU (Nice Part Usage) is key to this build. The team that wins this are given 1/2 hour of Brickman's technical expertise for the Elimination Challenge.
- Elimination Challenge "Great Ball Contraption": The seven teams have 10 hours to build a section of a Great Ball Contraption, all linked. If the ball does not pass through a build, that team is up for elimination. Story telling is the main criterion for judgement.

Team	Lego Design	Result
Advantage Challenge
Andrew & Damian	Space Shark	Winner
David & Gus	Stooping Bald Eagle	Top Two
Joss & Henry	Thumbs Up	Bonus Point
Caleb & Alex	Stuntmen in Space	Safe
Scott & Owen	Flying Chicken Man	Safe
Henry & Sarah	Space Ship	Safe
Ryan & Gabby	Eggman and Aeronautic Acrobats	Safe
Elimination Challenge
David & Gus	Carnival Clown (Laughing Clown Game)	Winner
Ryan & Gabby	Music Class	Top Two
Andrew & Damian	Wrecking Ball on the Loose	Immunity
Scott & Owen	Dutch Windmill	Safe
Joss & Henry	Pinball Machine	Safe
Caleb & Alex	Runaway Meatball	Bottom Two
Henry & Sarah	Putt Putt	Eliminated

=== Challenge 8 ===
- Airdate - 24 April 2023
- Challenge "Disney": The six teams have ten hours to create a storytelling, emotional scene from an iconic animated Disney film (as part of the 100th Anniversary of Disney)—the teams were given six choices of films. No moving parts or mechanisms were allowed. The team with the Grand Brick, David & Gus, chose the films for all the teams.
- Advantage: The teams were not told if the build was an elimination build, the Grand Brick is passed to the new winner.

Team	Lego Design	Result
David & Gus	Peter Pan "Peter Pan & Captain Hook Sword Fight"	Winner
Joss & Henry	Moana "Te Kā Battle Scene"	Top Two
Andrew & Damian	Up "Lift Off"	Safe
Caleb & Alex	Toy Story "The Claw"	Safe
Scott & Owen	Fantasia "The Sorcerer's Apprentice, Mops"	Safe
Ryan & Gabby	Frozen "Olaf Gets a Nose"	Safe

=== Challenge 9 ===
- Airdate - 25 April 2023
- Challenge "Explosion in Motion": The six teams have nine hours to build something that has motion in it and will explode using three explosive charges. A Hollywood-style story must be told with the build and explosions.
- Advantage: The teams were not told if the build was an elimination build, the Grand Brick is passed to the new winner.

Team	Lego Design	Result
Scott & Owen	Pirate Robbery	Winner
Ryan & Gabby	Gem Train Explosion	Top Two
David & Gus	Robot City Destruction	Immunity
Joss & Henry	The Rocker	Safe
Andrew & Damian	Prison Break	Safe
Caleb & Alex	The Alien	Safe

=== Challenge 10 ===
- Airdate - 30 April 2023
- Challenge "The Heist": The six remaining Grand Masters teams have 14 hours to build their own portion of a city-wide heist, based on a blueprint map, taking place in minifigure scale. The previous winners, Scott & Owen, chose first and assigned the remainder of the sections of the city to the rest of the teams.
- Advantage: The teams were not told if the build was an elimination build, the Grand Brick is passed to the new winners.

Team	Lego Design	Result
Scott & Owen	Train Station "Victorian Royal Train Heist"	Winner
Joss & Henry	Jewellers "Family Jewels by 1920s Gangsters Car Smash"	Top Two
Andrew & Damian	Hotel "Hotel Hoist Heist using Giant Helicopter"	Safe
Ryan & Gabby	Bank "Clown Heist using Tunnel from Shoe Shop"	Safe
Caleb & Alex	Art Gallery "Janitor Heist with Rubbish Truck"	Bottom Two
David & Gus	Docks "Luxury Yacht Heist with Giant Magnet"	Eliminated

=== Challenge 11 ===
- Airdate - 1 May 2023
- Challenge "Best of the Best": The remaining five teams had 10 hours to build a design assigned from the best challenges from the previous four seasons, competing against the winning builds from that original challenge. The previous winners, Scott & Owen, selected their preferred challenge and assigned challenges for the other teams.
- Advantage: The Grand Brick is passed to the new winners, who advance through to Finals Week.

Team	Lego Design	Result
Joss & Henry	"Cut in Half" from Challenge 3, Season 1 and Challenge 6, Season 3 Mr Coffee Robotic Coffee Machine	Winner
Caleb & Alex	"One Hanging Brick" from Challenge 4, Season 2 Suspended Food Chain	Top Two
Scott & Owen	"Beginning, Middle & End" from Challenge 12, Season 4 The Rise and Fall of Rome	Immunity
Andrew & Damian	"Snow Globe" from Challenge 3, Season 3 Proposal in Paris	Safe
Ryan & Gabby	"Blown Away" from Challenge 9, Season 4 Chinese Dragon	Safe

=== Challenge 12 ===
- Airdate - 2 May 2023
- Challenge "Cliff Hanger": The teams were given 12 hours to build a mountain dwelling off a pre-constructed lego cliff attached by six technic studs. Teams were told it was an elimination challenge. There was a Hamish Blake bonus point for the build that came out the furthest from the cliff face. Joss and Henry, the previous winners, chose their minifig first and assigned the minifigs to the remaining teams.

Team	Minifig - Lego Design	Result - Distance
Scott & Owen	Ice Queen - "Ice Queen vs Lava Monster" with Ice Castle	Winner - 2.18m
Caleb & Alex	Samurai - "Samurai Battle" with Castle and Dragon	Safe - 1.20m
Joss & Henry	Wizard - "The Wizard's Farm" on Floating Islands with a Griffin Stealing Sheep	Immunity - 0.63m
Ryan & Gabby	Alpine Girl - "Heidi From the Hills" Riding a Goose, Landing on a Stone Hands with Chalet in Background	Safe - 1.29m
Andrew & Damian	Spaceman - "Space Race"	Eliminated - 2.31m

=== Challenge 13 ===
- Airdate - 7 May 2023
- Challenge "Jumper": In the penultimate challenge of LEGO Grand Masters, the four teams have 16 hours to build a 'jumper' or replacement carousel horse that is part of a real carousel at Sydney's Luna Park.

Team	Lego Design	Result
Caleb & Alex	Croc in a Bathtub	Winner
Joss & Henry	Seahorse	Top Two
Scott & Owen	Honey Bee	Bottom Two
Ryan & Gabby	Butterfly Librarian	Eliminated

=== Grand Finale ===
- Airdate - 8 May 2023
- Challenge "Grand Finale": The teams are given 28 hours to build something of their own choice yet still needing to adhere to the criteria of technical skills, story-telling elements and overall aesthetic. The Team with the most votes is crowned LEGO Masters: Grand Master champions and claim the $100,000 prize.
- Voting & Judgment: 200 members of the public judged the builds, assigning their Black Bricks worth 1 vote to whichever model they liked most. Completing the vote, Brickman awards the Grand Brick worth 100 votes, while Hamish awards 1/2 vote with the Beige Brick.

Team	Lego Design	Result
Scott & Owen	Titan (Holding a City on Its Shoulder Above Lava)	Winners
Joss & Henry	Forest Guardian and the Traveller (Deer God Forest Spirit)	Runners up
Caleb & Alex	King of the Jungle (Lion on a Throne)	Eliminated

== Ratings ==
No.	Title	Air date	Timeslot	Overnight ratings		Consolidated ratings		Total viewers	Ref(s)
No.	Title	Air date	Timeslot	Viewers	Rank	Viewers	Rank	Total viewers	Ref(s)
1	Challenge 1	10 April 2023	Monday 7:30pm	502,000	8	—N/a	—N/a	502,000	
2	Challenge 2	11 April 2023	Tuesday 7:30pm	435,000	12	—N/a	—N/a	435,000	
3	Challenge 3	12 April 2023	Wednesday 7:30pm	454,000	11	—N/a	—N/a	454,000	
4	Challenge 4	16 April 2023	Sunday 7:00pm	516,000	5	—N/a	—N/a	516,000	
5	Challenge 5	17 April 2023	Monday 7:30pm	448,000	12	—N/a	—N/a	448,000	
6	Challenge 6	18 April 2023	Tuesday 7:30pm	411,000	12	—N/a	—N/a	411,000	
7	Challenge 7	23 April 2023	Sunday 7:00pm	512,000	5	—N/a	—N/a	512,000	
8	Challenge 8	24 April 2023	Monday 7:30pm	454,000	9	—N/a	—N/a	454,000	
9	Challenge 9	25 April 2023	Tuesday 7:30pm	480,000	10	—N/a	—N/a	480,000	
10	Challenge 10	30 April 2023	Sunday 7:00pm	548,000	6	—N/a	—N/a	548,000	
11	Challenge 11	1 May 2023	Monday 7:30pm	521,000	9	—N/a	—N/a	521,000	
12	Challenge 12	2 May 2023	Tuesday 7:30pm	486,000	8	—N/a	—N/a	486,000	
13	Challenge 13	7 May 2023	Sunday 7:00pm	567,000	6	—N/a	—N/a	567,000	
14	Grand Finale Winners Announced	8 May 2023	Monday 7:30pm Monday 9:00pm	576,000 598,000	10 7	—N/a	—N/a	576,000 598,000	
