= Prime7 News =

Former Australian local television news service

- Division of: Prime7
- Opening Theme: The Mission
- Founded: 1960s
- Defunct: 2022
- Headquarters: Head Office: Canberra, Australian Capital Territory, Australia
- Area served: Regional Australia
- Broadcast programs: Prime7 Local News; Prime7 News at 6:30
- Parent: Seven West Media
- Formerly: Prime News; Prime Local News; Prime Nightly News
- Successor: Seven News Regional

Prime7 News was a local television news service in parts of regional Australia, produced by Prime7. A statewide national bulletin, 5 full local news bulletins, and news update services was presented from Prime Media's National Headquarters in Canberra to viewers in Regional NSW, ACT, Regional VIC and Gold Coast QLD.

As a Seven Network owned-and-operated station, it also broadcast:

- Seven News
- NBC Today
- Seven Early News
- Sunrise
- The Morning Show
- Seven Morning News
- Seven News At 4
- Seven News The Latest
- Weekend Sunrise
- The Morning Show Weekend
- Seven Weekend News

== Regional services ==
=== Prime7 Local News ===
The Prime7 Local News logo used between 2017 and 2022

The Prime7 News logo used between 2011 and 2017

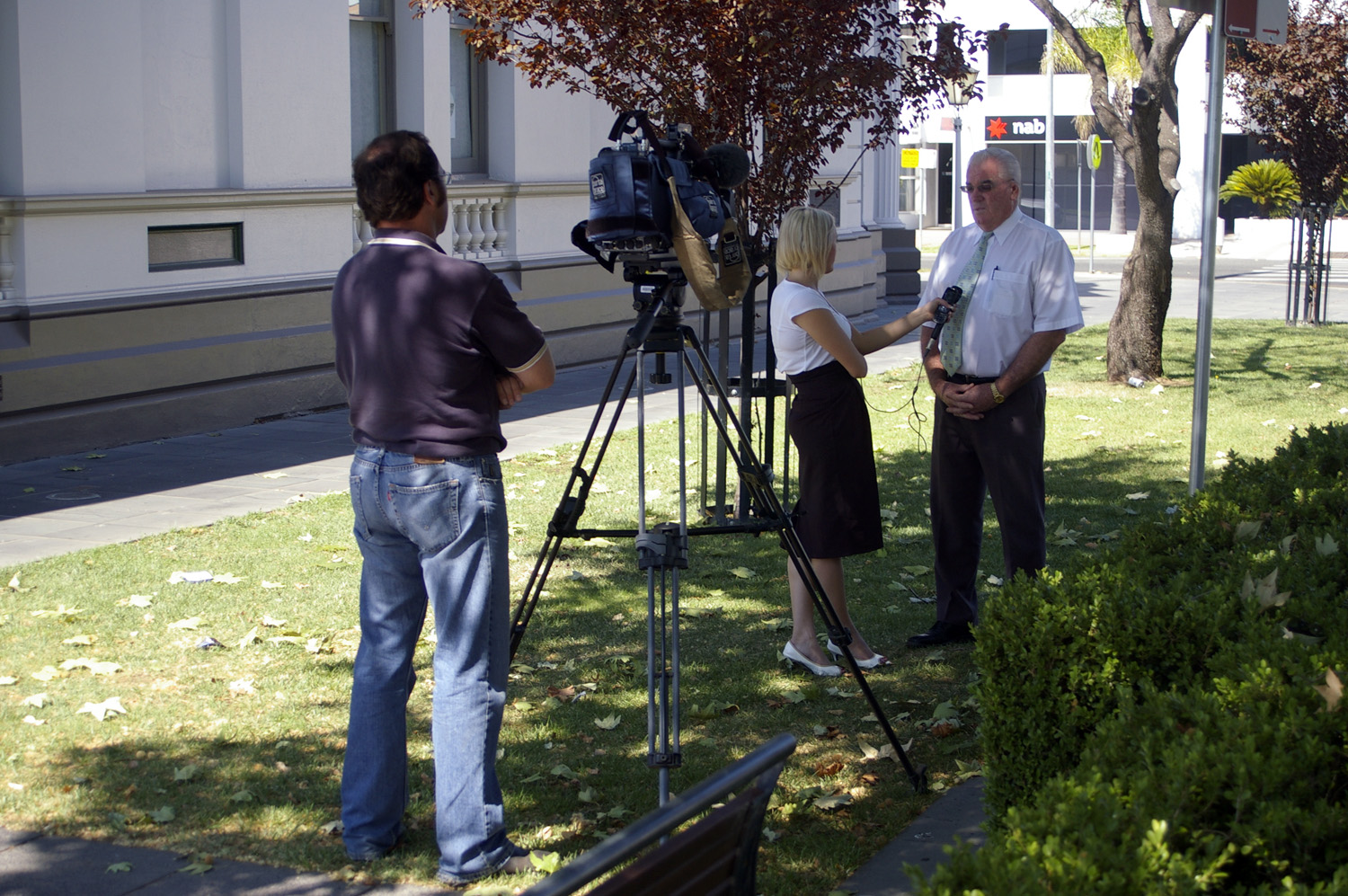
Former Prime News reporter Ashlea Brown interviewing Wagga Wagga Mayor Kerry Pascoe

Prime7's flagship bulletin aired at 6pm in five distinct local editions for the Border, Central West, North West, North Coast and Wagga Wagga broadcast regions. The bulletins were presented by Madelaine Collignon, with Kirstie Fitzpatrick as the weather presenter. Each region had five reporters while the North Coast has four separate bureaus with its own reporter, such as Port Macquarie's Samantha Crowe.

Presentation used to be presented separately from Prime Television's launch after aggregation, including full local news services for the Gold Coast, Canberra, Wollongong and Newcastle; currently, the network's full bulletin regions were reduced to five, and production of these were centralised from Prime7's headquarters in Canberra. Separate presentations remained for Northern and Southern New South Wales until 13 February 2017, when Prime7 Local News became a single unified presentation. Since the closure of the Tamworth studios in April 2015, the North West edition of the bulletin used to broadcast live from Canberra; it has since then exchanged years later to the NSW North Coast edition, Prime7's largest market with a full bulletin service.

Since 2015, the latest bulletins from each of the five regions become available to watch on their respective YouTube pages for 30 days after broadcast. Following Seven West Media's purchase of Prime Media in 2021, video on demand for these five bulletins were also made available on Seven's streaming service 7plus from early 2022.

In July 2022, the “Prime7 News” branding was retired and it now falls under the Seven News brand.

=== Prime7 News at 6:30 ===
Until 21 February 2014, Prime7 broadcast a delayed Seven News into areas that receive full Prime7 Local News bulletins on weeknights. Since 24 February 2014, Prime7 produced its own live bulletin due to the extension of Seven News to one hour on the eastern seaboard. This was presented by Daniel Gibson at 6:30pm, and covered national and international news that were being broadcast by Seven News in its metropolitan counterparts. Kirstie Fitzpatrick presented the expanded weather forecast, which features state, East Coast metropolitan cities and national weather.

The statewide edition, however, did not cover across the entire New South Wales. Albury (which was served by sister station AMV in Victoria) didn't receive this bulletin and continued to receive an edited version of Seven News Melbourne, which had been trimmed down to 30 minutes. The edited version featured the first half before joining live for sports and weather.

=== Local news updates ===
The Prime News logo used between 2001 and 2011

The news bulletins for the Gold Coast was axed in 2000, and those for Newcastle, Canberra, and Wollongong were discontinued in 2001. At the same time, the network's Moree news bureau, which provided stories for the Tamworth bulletin, was closed. This, as well as the closure of bulletins by Southern Cross Broadcasting in parts of Queensland and New South Wales, prompted an investigation by the Australian Broadcasting Authority. New rules were later set out requiring regional stations to offer minimum levels of local content, over a six-week period.

Two-minute news updates were introduced to Newcastle, Wollongong and Canberra in 2004. There are also updates presented for Western Victoria, Central Victoria and Gippsland. These were presented by Phoebe Deas with weather presented by Daniel Gibson. Craig Moore presented weekend weather updates across the Prime7 broadcast area.

Prime7's Gold Coast transmitters did not carry any local news updates, as it is not a regional market required, by law, to fulfil minimum quota rules; those getting local news rely instead on Seven's GC transmitters carrying opt-outs from Brisbane's BTQ, including its weeknight Seven Gold Coast News bulletins.

== Notable personalities ==
A number of well-known news presenters and television personalities began their careers at Prime7 News, including:

- Former Seven News Canberra correspondent and current 10 News First Perth reporter Natalie Forrest
- Former Studio 10 co-host Jessica Rowe
- The Morning Show co-host Kylie Gillies
- Former Million Dollar Minute and Family Feud host Grant Denyer.
- Current Nine News Queensland reporter Shannon Marshall-McCormack
- Current A Current Affair reporter Alex Bernhardt
