= Rosanny Zayas =

American actress

- Born: Brooklyn, New York
- Education: Juilliard School
- Occupation: Actress
- Years active: 2013–present

Rosanny Zayas is an American actress. She is perhaps best known for her role as Sophie Suarez on The L Word: Generation Q (2019–2023). Zayas has acted in The Code, Orange Is the New Black, and Elementary.

== Early life and education ==
Zayas was born in Brooklyn and raised in the Ozone Park neighborhood of Queens, New York to an Afro-Dominican family. She attended Forest Hills High School, where she was a member of the choral group and began acting at the encouragement of the drama teacher.

She received her bachelor's degree from Queens College, where she studied acting under Claudia Fieldstein. Zayas graduated from the Juilliard School with her master of fine arts degree in the program's second graduate class. While at Juilliard, her performance in the titular role of José's Marisol received positive reception and helped her break into the New York theater scene.

== Career ==
Zayas appeared in the Public Theater Mobile Unit's 2018 production of A Midsummer Night's Dream as Helena. Elisabeth Vincentelli wrote of her performance for the New York Times, "Best is Rosanny Zayas as Helena, who demonstrates nimble comic timing and always seems to be completely in the moment — a rarer ability than you’d think, even among the best actors."

She was a lead cast member on The L Word: Generation Q's three seasons as Sophie Suarez, a Dominican American producer on Alice Pieszecki's talk show The Alice Show. When Zayas was a high school student, she was an avid viewer of the original series.

Zayas has acted in Modern Persuasion, Orange is the New Black, The Code, and Elementary. She also has a supporting role in the mini-series Angelyne and she is a series regular in the Netflix series Echoes.
