= Continental Drift (TV series) =

Australian music television show (1983–1985)

Continental Drift was an Australian music television show broadcast by SBS. It was hosted by Basia Bonkowski who was then hosting Rock Around the World. It was axed in 1985.

== See also ==
- List of Australian music television shows
- List of Australian television series
