= Daniel Gibson (presenter) =

Australian television presenter

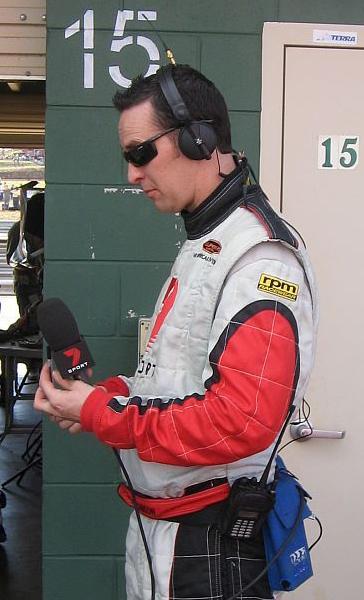
- Gibson at Hidden Valley Raceway
- Born: 19 July 1972 (age 52); Victoria, Australia
- Occupation(s): Television presenter, newsreader, weatherman

Daniel Gibson (born 19 July 1972 in Victoria) is an Australian television presenter and is seen weeknightly across Seven as newsreader and weatherman in the role of network presenter.

Gibson started his career in radio in the early 1990s at 2PK in Parkes NSW, before moving on to radio stations in Victoria including 3WM Horsham and ending up in the nation's capital, Canberra doing talkback on 2CC and then hosted the breakfast show on 2CA.

Gibson has been part of Seven since May 2000.

In 2007, Gibson joined the V8 Supercar telecast as pit lane reporter for the Seven Network. He is teamed up with Matthew White, Neil Crompton as well as Mark Beretta and Grant Denyer. Gibson was also part of MMM's broadcast of the Melbourne Formula 1 GP. He supports the Western Bulldogs in the Australian Football League.

After gaining a reputation as "the wacky weatherman", he made the transition to newsreader in 2011.
