= Mates on a Mission =

Australian television series

- Genre: Travel
- Starring: Shane Jacobson; Todd McKenney; Kris Smith; Brian “B.T” Taylor
- Country of origin: Australia
- Original language: English
- No. of series: 1
- No. of episodes: 3

Production
- Running time: 80-90 minutes (including ads)

Original release
- Network: Seven Network
- Release: 13 January – 27 January 2022

Mates on a Mission is an Australian travel series which premiered on the Seven Network on 13 January 2022. The series features Shane Jacobson, Todd McKenney, Kris Smith and Brian “B.T.” Taylor as they travel the globe taking on challenges to raise awareness for charitable causes including mental health, heart disease and bowel cancer. The foursome previously appeared on charity reality series The Real Full Monty in 2018.

The series originally began filming in early 2019 and was intended to screen either later in 2019 or in 2020. Filming took place in Germany, Japan and Las Vegas. Production was later affected by the COVID-19 pandemic, which cut short filming. Seven later announced that it would air the series sometime during the summer of 2021/22.

== See also ==
- List of Australian television series
- List of programs broadcast by Seven Network
- Travel Guides
