= Echoes (miniseries) =

American television drama miniseries

- Promotional poster
- Created by: Vanessa Gazy
- Starring: Michelle Monaghan; Matt Bomer; Daniel Sunjata; Ali Stroker; Karen Robinson; Rosanny Zayas; Michael O'Neill; Celia Weston; Gable Swanlund; Jonathan Tucker
- Country of origin: Australia
- Original language: English
- No. of series: 1
- No. of episodes: 7

Production
- Executive producers: Vanessa Gazy; Brian Yorkey; Imogen Banks; Quinton Peeples; Kat Candler
- Producer: Carole Sanders Peterman
- Camera setup: Multi-camera
- Running time: 41–55 minutes
- Production companies: That Kid Ed Productions; EndemolShine Banks Australia

Original release
- Network: Netflix
- Release: 19 August 2022

Echoes is a mystery drama miniseries that premiered on Netflix on 19 August 2022.

== Synopsis ==
Identical twins Leni and Gina have repeatedly swapped lives in secret, culminating in a double life where they share homes, husbands and a child. Their precarious existence is thrown into disarray when one of the twins goes missing.

== Cast ==
=== Main ===
- Michelle Monaghan as Leni and Gina McCleary, twin sisters
- Matt Bomer as Jack Beck, Leni's husband
- Karen Robinson as Sheriff Louise Floss
- Ali Stroker as Claudia McCleary, the older sister of Leni and Gina who has been paralyzed.
- Gable Swanlund as Mathilda "Mattie" Beck, Jack and Leni's nine-year-old daughter and Gina's niece.
- Rosanny Zayas as Deputy Paula Martinez
- Michael O'Neill as Victor McCleary, Leni, Gina and Claudia's father
- Jonathan Tucker as Dylan James, Gina's ex-boyfriend.
- Daniel Sunjata as Charles "Charlie" Davenport, Gina's husband who is a therapist

=== Recurring ===
- Madison Abbott as a young Leni
- Victoria Abbott as a young Gina
- Clayton Royal Johnson as a young Dylan
- Celia Weston as Georgia Tyler, Dylan's grandmother
- Déjá Dee as Samida
- Tyner Rushing as Maria Czerny McCleary, Leni, Gina and Claudia's dead mother
- Alise Willis as Meg, Leni's former bestfriend
- Maddie Nichols as Natasha
- Lucy Hammond as a Young Claudia McCleary
- Onye Eme-Akwari as Beau McMillan
- Lauren H. Davis as Liss

== Episodes ==
No.	Title	Directed by	Written by	Original release date
1	"Home"	Kat Candler	Vanessa Gazy	August 19, 2022
Gina McCleary learns that her identical twin, Leni, is missing from their family's ranch in Mt. Echo after someone broke into their stable and released the horses. Gina arrives at Leni and husband Jack's home to find a search party. She learns Leni neglected to mention several important things in their shared diary vlog. As Sheriff Floss and Deputy Martinez leave they notice a man who was not part of the search party. Gina goes to her childhood home where her elderly father Victor and wheelchair-using younger sister Claudia live. A flashback shows their cancer-stricken mother, Maria, giving them charm bracelets: a lion for Leni and a dove for Gina, in reference to their personalities, while Claudia is excluded. In the present, Gina discovers a doll missing its head and arms; she later finds an arm outside. The next morning, Leni's horse returns with blood on its neck. The search party finds another horse in a ravine, shot dead with its microchip cut out. Jack tells Gina that Leni has left home before. Gina remembers when she and Leni ran away together after their mother's funeral and recalls Leni's actions during their childhood causing problems, due to mistaken identity. Gina finds two doll hands, one with Leni's charm bracelet. She sets out to look for Leni and enters a cave where the twins used to hide and finds an outfit of Leni's with the doll's missing head. A flashback shows the twins running from a burning church and Leni telling Gina they have to switch places. In the present, Gina finds a book she authored with a note inside telling her she now gets both lives but has to choose which. Flashbacks show the twins at various ages on their birthday agreeing to swap lives for the year ahead. Gina is actually Leni and the missing "Leni" is Gina. Leni changes into the clothes left by her sister and gives herself a head wound. She returns to the farm to be greeted by "her" young daughter Matilda "Mattie."
2	"Birthday"	Kat Candler	Vanessa Gazy	August 19, 2022
3	"Party"	Li Lu	Brian Yorkey	August 19, 2022
4	"Body"	Li Lu	Quinton Peeples	August 19, 2022
5	"Gina"	Anna Mastro	Julie Hébert and Mimi Won Techentin	August 19, 2022
6	"Fire"	Anna Mastro	Quinton Peeples & M. K. Malone	August 19, 2022
7	"Falls"	Valerie Weiss	Quinton Peeples & Vanessa Gazy	August 19, 2022

== Production ==
Echoes was created and written by Vanessa Gazy, who also co-executive produced with Brian Yorkey, Quinton Peeples and Imogen Banks of EndemolShine Banks Australia. Yorkey and Peeples both served as showrunners. Michelle Monaghan starred in this miniseries. Matt Bomer added to the cast in a lead role. Daniel Sunjata added to the cast in a lead role. Ali Stroker, Karen Robinson and Rosanny Zayas added to the cast as series regulars. In October 2021, Michael O'Neill, Celia Weston, Gable Swanlund, Tyner Rushing, Hazel Mason, Ginger Mason, Alise Willis, Maddie Nichols and Jonathan Tucker were added to the cast. The series premiered on 19 August 2022.

Although it is an Australian production, this series is set in the United States. Filming took place in Wilmington, North Carolina.

== Reception ==
On Rotten Tomatoes, Echoes has an overall approval rating of 24% with an average score of 4.8/10 based on 21 reviews, with the site's consensus being, "Double the Michelle Monaghan should be a winning proposition, but Echoes is a resounding misfire whose promise grows fainter with each silly twist." Metacritic, which uses a weighted average, assigned a score of 46 out of 100 based on 9 critics, indicating "mixed or average reviews".
