= Basia Bonkowski =

Australian television presenter (died 2022)

Basia Jolanta Bonkowski
- Born: Adelaide, South Australia
- Died: 3 September 2022
- Other name: Basia Rendall
- Occupations: Television presenter, producer, author
- Spouse: Kimble Rendall (m. 1982)
- Children: 2

Basia Jolanta Bonkowski (died 3 September 2022) also known as Basia Rendall, was an Australian television presenter, television producer and writer. She presented Rock Around the World (1982–1985) on SBS-TV.

== Biography ==
Bonkowski was born in Adelaide, one of four children of Polish immigrants, Maria (1920–2003) and Jerzy Jozef Bonkowski (1914–1978). Her father had been a Polish Air Force flight lieutenant from 1934 to 1939, who was captured by the Germans during the Fall of Warsaw. He spent World War 2 (1939–1945) as a P.O.W. and worked for the US Army upon his release. Her parents had arrived in Australia on 25 January 1951, with her older brother, via SS Liguria. Her older sister was born in 1952 in a holding camp, near Mildura, where her father worked as a storeman, before the family relocated to a Woodside holding camp. Her parents and older siblings left that camp in 1955 to relocate to Eden Hills, when her father gained a Royal Australian Air Force (RAAF) commission as a pilot officer (general reserve).

Bonkowski attended Cabra College and then University of Adelaide to study Law, when she was diagnosed with Hodgkin lymphoma at 17 years old. She transferred to Flinders University, where she switched to English Literature and Drama. Also studying Drama at Flinders was Bernard Neeson, who founded the Angels in 1976. After graduation, Bonkowski worked as a drama teacher at Marion High School – she organised for the Angels to perform for the students.

Bonkowski was the presenter of TV programs including, Rock Around the World (SBS, 1982–1985), Continental Drift (SBS, 1983–1985), Music Video (Channel 10), and The Big Byte (SBS). Australian rock band, Painters and Dockers's first single, "Basia!" (March 1985) was a paean to her work on Rock Around the World.

As a television producer she worked for Screentime and Endemol Shine and was a producer of the series RBT for the Nine Network.

Bonkowski, studied at the University of Sydney before becoming a published author with Shimmer, a 2009 book about her mother, and Jesse's World, a book on international adoption published in 2005.

== Personal life ==
Bonkowski married television producer, director and musician, Kimble Rendall in 1982 and they had two adopted children, William and Camille.

She died on 3 September 2022 from a return of her lymphoma.
