= Asia Downunder =

New Zealand television programme

Asia Downunder is a television magazine programme, formerly known as Asia Dynamic, reporting on activities of Asians in New Zealand and New Zealand Asians abroad which ran from 1994 to 2011. Its target audience was the Asian population in New Zealand, and the programme was funded by New Zealand On Air.

== Content ==
According to Melissa Lee, the programme was "about why Asian people do what [they] do, when, where, how and with whom. It isn't just a television programme but a bridge connecting our diverse communities—to promote better understanding." Lee is a former Asia Downunder producer and presenter who is now a list MP for the National Party. For the last four seasons, the show was produced by Chris Wright and presented by Kadambari Gladding formerly Kadambari Raghukumar.
