= Lego Masters (Australian TV series) season 4 =

Lego Masters
- Season 4
- Hosted by: Hamish Blake
- Judges: Ryan "The Brickman" McNaught
- No. of teams: 8
- Winners: Joss & Henry
- Runners-up: Caleb & Alex
- Location: Sydney, Australia
- No. of episodes: 14

Release
- Original network: Nine Network
- Original release: 18 April – 16 May 2022

Season chronology
- ← Previous; Season 3 Next → Season 5

The fourth season of Australian reality television series Lego Masters aired on 18 April 2022. Hamish Blake returned as host along with Ryan "The Brickman" McNaught as judge.

== Production ==
Auditions for the fourth season opened in May 2021 asking for applicants 15 years old and above. During the 2021 season it was announced that the 9 Network had commissioned Hamish Blake to return to host the program for a further two seasons (until 2023). The series was filmed at Fox Studios Sydney since production was moved from Melbourne to Sydney due to Covid border restrictions.

== Teams ==
Team	Ages	Relationship/ Occupation^{1}	Status
Joss & Henry	23 & 20	Newy Brothers	Winners
Caleb & Alex	21 & 25	Law student & Makeup artist	Runners up
Gene & Nick	32 & 30	Video editing best friends	Eliminated (Challenge 14)
Lexi & Rachael	33 & 37	Video Editor & Auditor	Eliminated (Challenge 13)
Kirsti & Daniel	44 & 42	Support worker & Web developer	Eliminated (Challenge 12)
Paul & Trent	50 & 45	LEGO loving husbands	Eliminated (Challenge 10)
Branko & Max	48 & 17	Father & Son	Eliminated (Challenge 7)
Andrew & Crystal	38 & 30	Social media producer & Content creator	Eliminated (Challenge 4)

Notes

*^1 Not all teams in the season have an existing relationship (e.g. family or friend); some were paired together during the application process due to single applications.

== Elimination history ==
Teams' progress through the competition
Team	Challenge													
Team	1	2	3	4	5	6	7	8	9	10	11	12	13	GF
Joss & Henry	Top One	Safe	Safe	Safe	Top Two	Top Two	Top One	Top One	Top One	Safe	Top One	Immunity	Safe	Winners
Caleb & Alex	Safe	Safe	Safe	Safe	Safe	Safe	Safe	Safe	Safe	Top One	Safe	Top One	Top One	Runners up
Gene & Nick	Safe	Safe	Top One	Top One	Top One	Top One	Advantage	Safe	Top One	Safe	Top Two	Top Two	Safe	Eliminated
Lexi & Rachael	Safe	Top One	Top Two	Safe	Safe	Safe	Safe	Top Two	Safe	Safe	Safe	Safe	Eliminated	
Kirsti & Daniel	Safe	Top Two	Safe	Top Two	Safe	Safe	Top Two	Safe	Safe	Advantage	Safe	Eliminated		
Paul & Trent	Top Three	Safe	Safe	Safe	Safe	Safe	Safe	Safe	Safe	Eliminated				
Branko & Max	Top Three	Safe	Safe	Safe	Safe	Safe	Eliminated							
Andrew & Crystal	Safe	Safe	Safe	Eliminated										

Table key
Advantage	Team received an advantage from Brickman
Top One	Team came first place in the challenge or the show
Immunity	Team is immune and safe from elimination
Safe	Team was safe from elimination after passing a challenge/round.
Eliminated	Team was eliminated from the competition

== Series Details ==
=== Challenge 1 ===
- Airdate - 18 April 2022
- Challenge: "Drain The Ocean" Each of the eight teams has 16 hours to create a model of the bottom of the ocean on a circular base plate which will need to stay together under water. The models will be placed under water in a pool and the water drained. Models will be viewed from above.
- Advantage: The winner of the challenge received The Titanium Brick of Triumph which they can use to keep them safe from a future Elimination Challenge.

Team	Lego Design	Result
Joss & Henry	Deep terror sea serpent	Advantage
Branko & Max	Poseidon statue	Top three
Paul & Trent	Art wreckage with van Gogh and Mondrian paintings	Top three
Caleb & Alex	Giant seaworm attack	Safe
Andrew & Crystal	Amelia Earhart wreckage	Safe
Kirsti & Daniel	Underwater alien world	Safe
Rachael & Lexi	Magical mermaids (mother and daughter)	Safe
Gene & Nick	Wild wild wet (underwater Western scene with sea horses)	Safe

=== Challenge 2 ===
- Airdate - 19 April 2022
- Challenge: "Stuntman" Each of the eight teams has six hours to create a vehicle model based on a minifig pick. Vehicles are hydraulically flung through a ring of fire and over nine yellow Lego school buses measuring a total of 5 m.Each team is scored out of ten for story-telling and style as their build exploded upon landing, plus a bonus point for the vehicle that is flung the farthest distance. This challenge is not an elimination, but the holders of the Titanium Brick of Triumph Joss and Henry, chose their minifig and all the minifigs for each team.
- Advantage: The winner of the challenge received The Titanium Brick of Triumph which they can use to keep them safe from a future Elimination Challenge.

Team	Minifig - Lego Design	Result - Distance Jumped
Rachael & Lexi	Rocket man - The Show Must Go On (Elton John tribute)	1st place Advantage (7.9 points) + bonus point - 8.1 m
Kirsti & Daniel	Chicken man - Rubber chicken	2nd place (8.8 points) - did not clear buses (<5 m)
Joss & Henry	Witch - Sweet ride pumpkin dragster	3rd place (7.8 points) - 6.0 m
Paul & Trent	Corn man - Cob mo-bile	4th place (7.6 points) - 6.3 m
Gene & Nick	Unicorn girl - Weekend ride three wheeled motorcycle	Safe- 7.9 m
Branko & Max	Pizza man - 'Pitza' pizza box	Safe - 7.3 m
Caleb & Alex	Pilot - Wooden flying contraption	Safe - 7.0 m
Andrew & Crystal	Cowgirl - Burrito food truck	Safe - did not clear buses (<5 m)

=== Challenge 3 ===
- Airdate - 20 April 2022
- Challenge: "Build That Tune" The eight teams have 10 hours create a song title out of LEGO, making the story-telling clear enough that a musical mystery guest (Delta Goodrem) can guess what song they have built without the teams saying a word. Teams were not told if the build was an elimination until the end of the judging the challenge was not an elimination. Holders of the Titanium Brick of Triumph Rachael & Lexi, chose their song and all the songs for each team as songs were revealed at random from a 45 RPM jukebox record player.
- Advantage: The winner of the challenge received The Titanium Brick of Triumph which they can use to keep them safe from a future Elimination Challenge.

Team	Song - Lego Design	Result
Gene & Nick	Danger Zone	1st place Advantage - guessed
Rachael & Lexi	I Heard It Through the Grape Vine	2nd place - guessed
Joss & Henry	Stairway to Heaven	safe - guessed
Paul & Trent	Lucy in the Sky with Diamonds	safe - guessed
Branko & Max	It's a Long Way to the Top (If You Wanna Rock 'n' Roll)	safe - guessed
Caleb & Alex	Sitting on Top of the World	safe - guessed
Kirsti & Daniel	River Deep - Mountain High	safe - not guessed
Andrew & Crystal	Smoke on the Water	safe - not guessed

=== Challenge 4 ===
- Airdate - 24 April 2022
- Advantage Challenge: "Car of the Future" The eight teams have six hours to build a car of the future. The vehicles will need to balance on a magnetic platform to achieve a hovering effect. The teams have one minute to put it on the platform, and the build must stay on in order to classed as 'floated'. The winner of the challenge received The Platinum Brick which they can use to keep them safe in the Elimination Challenge.
- Elimination Challenge: "Old is New" The eight teams have 11 hours to transform an old object by bringing it to 'life'. The new build has to connect to the old object and make a cohesive story. Holders of the Titanium Brick of Triumph Gene and Nick, chose their item and the items for each team. The team with the worst design was eliminated.

Advantage challenge
teams	Lego design	Result
Gene & Nick	The axel otl	winner floated safe
Alex & Caleb	The rock n roller	floated safe
Crystal & Andrew	The influencer mobile	floated safe
Trent & Paul	Ipanema dreaming	Floated safe
Kirsti & Daniel	The rocket billy	Did not float safe
Joss & Henry	The post apocalypse	Did not float safe
Branko & Max	The explorer vechile	Did not float safe
Lexi & Rachael	Pocket full of sunshine	Did not float safe

Elimination challenge
Teams	Lego design	Results
Gene & Nick	Underground jazz bar	Winner
Kirsti & Daniel	Carnival	Safe - Top 2
Caleb & Alex	Mice cinema	Safe
Trent & Paul	Clock monster	Safe
Joss & Henry	Duet between life and death	Safe
Branko & Max	Rat infested fridge	Safe
Lexi & Rachael	Japan in a suitcase	Safe - Bottom 2
Andrew & Crystal	Sewing Machine monster	Eliminated

=== Challenge 5 ===
- Airdate - 25 April 2022
- Challenge: "Cut-Away" The seven teams have 10 hours to build something at mini-fig scale that is whole on one side and when spun around, reveals a world that has been cut in half. The contestants were not told if the challenge was an elimination it was not. Holders of the Titanium Brick of Triumph Gene and Nick, had a mystery button that had an unknown purpose which they could press at any time during the build. When pressed, the button meant that only Gene and Nick could access the Brick Pit for one hour; other contestants had only one minute to grab what they needed for that hour.
- Advantage: The winner of the challenge received The Titanium Brick of Triumph which they can use to keep them safe in the Elimination Challenge.

Cut-Away
Teams	Lego design	Results
Gene & Nick	Alpine Cuckoo Clock	Winner
Joss & Henry	Dragon attack	Safe - Top 2
Caleb & Alex	Alien Space Station	Safe
Trent & Paul	Mega-bone vet surgery	Safe
Branko & Max	Rocket	Safe
Lexi & Rachael	1800's grand hotel	Safe
Kristi & Daniel	Attack of the robot	Safe

=== Challenge 6 ===
- Airdate - 26 April 2022
- Challenge: "Bridge Too Far" The seven teams had seven hours to create a bridge, a minimum of 50 bricks high, that can survive two independent shake plates. If more than one bridge can survive all 12 levels of shaking, then aesthetics will decide the winner. Holders of the Titanium Brick of Triumph, Gene and Nick, had an advantage that was not revealed until two hours into the build. The advantage was giving out the Necklace of Nuisance which requires the holders to complete an annoying task. Gene and Nick chose Branko and Max to have the Necklace of Nuisance and the team had to either sort LEGO or Max had to eat four bananas before the team could continue their build. At the five hour mark, Branko and Max had the choice of finding a blank head in a box of heads or to eat four bananas. Max chose to eat the four bananas again

Advantage: The winner of the challenge received The Titanium Brick of Triumph which they can use to keep them safe in the Elimination

Bridge Too Far
Teams	Lego design	Results
Gene & Nick	Heavy boy	Level 12 winner
Joss & Henry	Fire and ice	Level 9 safe
Lexi & Rachael	The bridge of past builds	level 6 safe
Kirsti & Daniel	Suspension bridge	level 5 safe
Caleb & Alex	Medieval bridge	level 5 safe
Trent & Paul	Industrial railway bridge	level 4 safe
Branko & Max	The engineer's bridge	Level 3 safe

=== Challenge 7 ===
- Airdate - 1 May 2022
- Advantage Challenge: "Dragon Race" The seven teams have 3 hours to build tiny dragons that are small enough to fly on a drone through a course on the Sydney Cricket Ground. The team with the fastest time gets a bonus point from Hamish Blake. The winner gets an advantage for the second build.
- Elimination Challenge: "Grandscapes " The seven teams have 10 hours to build a grand landscape using forced perspective. The advantage was the use of Hamish for one hour (the Brick Butler) to collect bricks from the pit. The contestants were not told it was an Elimination challenge until building was complete.

Team	Lego Design	Result - Time
“Advantage Challenge”
Gene & Nick	Skeleton dragon	Advantage - Safe - 0:41
Joss & Henry	Chinese New Year dragon	2nd Place - Crashed - n/a
Branko & Max	Banana dragon	Safe - 0:57
Paul & Trent	Dragon-fly (chimera)	Safe - 1:13
Caleb & Alex	Water dragon	Safe - 1:22
Kirsti & Daniel	Green forest dragon	Crashed - n/a
Rachael & Lexi	Red fire dragon	Crashed - n/a
“Elimination Challenge”
Joss & Henry	Secluded waterfall (microscale American wilderness fishing hut)	Winner
Kirsti & Daniel	Ship in distress (cliff & lighthouse)	Safe - Runner up
Gene & Nick	Fountain of Youth (Himalayan)	Safe
Paul & Trent	Egyptian archaeological site (temple & pyramids)	Safe
Rachael & Lexi	Winter wonderland (mountain)	Safe
Caleb & Alex	Grandma's cottage (mountain)	Safe - Bottom two
Branko & Max	Grand Canyon (gold mine)	Eliminated

=== Challenge 8 ===
- Airdate - 2 May 2022
- Challenge: "Spooky" The six teams have 10 hours to build a spooky world as one of six baseplates surrounding a spooky castle, with a minifig to direct the build. The holders of the Titanium Brick of Triumph Joss & Henry, chose the minifigs for each team.
- Advantage: The winner of the challenge received The Titanium Brick of Triumph which they can use to keep them safe in the Elimination Challenge. The contestants were not told if it was an Elimination until after the judging.

Team	Minifig - Lego Design	Result
Joss & Henry	Spider witch - House Spider (House on spider legs)	Winner
Rachael & Lexi	Ghost - Buyer's Remorse (Haunted mansion and tree monster)	Safe - Runner up
Gene & Nick	Mummy - Temple of the Tomb King (Cobra monster and traps)	Safe
Caleb & Alex	Frankenstein's monster - Evil Experiment (Monster arms bursting out of house)	Safe
Kirsti & Daniel	Creature from the Black Lagoon - The Hatching (Creature rising from swamp)	Bottom two
Paul & Trent	Werewolf - Wilderness Retreat (Resort for werewolves)	Bottom two

=== Challenge 9 ===
- Airdate - 3 May 2022
- Challenge: "Blown Away" The six teams have 10 hours to create a build that functions from the power of a wind machine a kinetic sculpture. Contestants were not told if the build was an elimination until the end it was not. Each build that can withstand the most wind as a percentage of maximum speed receives a bonus point from Hamish Blake. The holders of the Titanium Brick of Triumph Joss & Henry, received motivational fan interactions with Hamish Blake.
- Advantage: The winners due to a draw of the challenge received one half of The Titanium Brick of Triumph which both teams can use to keep them safe in the Elimination Challenge.

Team	Lego Design	Result - Wind Speed
Gene & Nick	Headbanging rocker (moving head)	Winner- Moved + bonus point - 100%
Joss & Henry	Moving aviator caterpillar trying to fly (moving legs and wings)	Winner - Moved + bonus point - 100%
Kirsti & Daniel	Walking triceratops (moving legs)	Moved + bonus point - 100%
Rachael & Lexi	Ballerina jewelry box (moving figure)	Moved + bonus point - 100%
Paul & Trent	Spinning hamster wheel (moving wheel)	Did not turn + bonus point - 100%
Caleb & Alex	Spell-casting wizard (moving arms)	Mechanism failed - 70%

=== Challenge 10 ===
- Airdate - 8 May 2022
- Advantage Challenge: "High Wire" The six teams have 6 hours to build something that drags itself across a high wire at least 10 meters. The teams were not told the builds would be tested outside until the builds were completed. Whichever build makes it the furthest combined with aesthetics was declared the winner. The winner of the challenge received an advantage in the next build.
- Elimination Challenge: "Secret Cities" The teams were presented with a half-built city. Teams must build in 10 hours a story that has a secret and tells the viewer what is actually going on in the facing city block. Each team was assigned a block and baseplate by Kirsti & Daniel. As the team with the advantage, they were also told to build under the baseplate, not only on top, by Brickman. The teams were not told the build was an Elimination until after the build. Henry & Joss and Gene & Nick still held The Titanium Brick of Triumph and were safe from elimination. The design with the worst story was eliminated.

Team	Lego Design	Result
“Advantage Challenge”
Kirsti & Daniel	Sloth Cable Car	Advantage - 10m
Gene & Nick	Floating Island	Safe - 5m
Caleb & Alex	Cat Burglar (cat with sack of money)	Safe - 4.5m
Joss & Henry	Chameleon	Safe - 2m
Paul & Trent	Barrel of Monkeys	Safe - 10 cm
Rachael & Lexi	Sloth	Safe - 0m
“Elimination Challenge”
Caleb & Alex	Coffee shop - Evil coffee corporation	Winner
Kirsti & Daniel	Cafe - Alien parade (mardi gras)	Safe - Runner up
Gene & Nick	Graffiti alley & police station- Thieving magpie	Safe
Joss & Henry	Dentist & chocolate shop - Plaque Busters (superhero lair)	Safe
Rachael & Lexi	Bakery & toy store - Hangry statue	Safe - Bottom two
Paul & Trent	Video store & library - Gaming grannies	Eliminated

=== Challenge 11 ===
- Airdate - 9 May 2022
- Challenge: "Window to the Future" The six teams had 12 hours to build a vision of the future as seen through the view of a window frame. Teams are given a box with studs that will be placed behind a window, and the holders of the Titanium Brick of Triumph Caleb and Alex, pressed a button with two hours remaining, and all the other teams had to move in slow motion for half an hour.
- Advantage: The winner of the challenge received The Titanium Brick of Triumph which they can use to keep them safe in the Elimination Challenge, making them the first team going straight to finals week.

Team	Lego Design	Result
Joss & Henry	The ultraglove 2099	Winner
Gene & Nick	Zero gravity skate park	Safe - Runner up
Kirsti & Daniel	The astronaut	Safe
Caleb & Alex	End of the world	Safe
Rachael & Lexi	Drone delivery	Safe

=== Challenge 12 ===
- Airdate - 10 May 2022
- Challenge: "Beginning, Middle & End" In the lead-up to finals week and a known elimination, teams have 12 hours to build a story on a rotating baseplate with three sections. The story must have a beginning, middle and an end. The story is shown through a Lego proscenium arch. The holders of The Titanium Brick of Triumph Joss & Henry, are safe from elimination.

Team	Lego Design	Result
Joss & Henry	The life of a dinosaur - Allosaurus hatching, living, museum skeleton	Immunity
Caleb & Alex	Two best friends - playing video game, pilots, crash and death	Winner
Gene & Nick	A boy and his snowman - Making, wintertime, melting	Safe
Rachael & Lexi	9 to 5 grind - office, burnout, tropical vacation	Safe
Kirsti & Daniel	A knight's quest - riding horse, fighting dragon, best friends	Eliminated

=== Challenge 13 ===
- Airdate - 15 May 2022
- Challenge: "Sky's the Limit" Teams are given a LEGO cloud and have 14 hours to create something that belongs on that cloud. At the end, one team will be eliminated and the three remaining teams will compete in the final.

Team	Lego Design	Result
Caleb & Alex	Gone Fishin' (Fisherman fishing for birds for his cat)	Winner
Joss & Henry	Aztec Sky God (Quetzalcoatl)	Safe
Gene & Nick	Rainbow Castle (Flying castle produces rainbows)	Safe
Rachael & Lexi	Weather Station (Factory for weather)	Eliminated

=== Grand Finale ===
- Airdate - 16 May 2022
- Grand Finale Challenge - Over 28 hours, the remaining three teams are tasked with building something of their own choice yet still needing to adhere to the criteria of technical skills, story-telling elements and overall aesthetic. The Team with the most votes would be crowned LEGO Masters champions and claim the $100,000 prize plus $50 donated by Hamish Blake.
- Voting & Judgment - The 200 members of the public judged the builds, assigning their Black Bricks worth 1 vote to whichever model they liked most. Completing the vote, Brickman was given the Titanium Brick worth 100 votes.

Team	Lego Design	Result
Joss & Henry	Kaiju Monster vs. Mecha Crab	Winners
Caleb & Alex	Minifig Tree Village	Runners up
Nick & Gene	Troll Attack	Eliminated

== Ratings ==
No.	Title	Air date	Timeslot	Overnight ratings		Consolidated ratings		Total viewers	Ref(s)
No.	Title	Air date	Timeslot	Viewers	Rank	Viewers	Rank	Total viewers	Ref(s)
1	Challenge 1	18 April 2022	Monday 7:30pm	672,000	6	643,000	4	1,315,000	
2	Challenge 2	19 April 2022	Tuesday 7:30pm	572,000	8	608,000	4	1,180,000	
3	Challenge 3	20 April 2022	Wednesday 7:30pm	562,000	8	581,000	4	1,143,000	
4	Challenge 4	24 April 2022	Sunday 7:00pm	511,000	4	614,000	3	1,125,000	
5	Challenge 5	25 April 2022	Monday 7:30pm	599,000	9	513,000	3	1,112,000	
6	Challenge 6	26 April 2022	Tuesday 7:30pm	654,000	7	529,000	6	1,183,000	
7	Challenge 7	1 May 2022	Sunday 7:00pm	652,000	4	510,000	4	1,162,000	
8	Challenge 8	2 May 2022	Monday 7:30pm	615,000	8	497,000	6	1,112,000	
9	Challenge 9	3 May 2022	Tuesday 7:30pm	547,000	9	489,000	6	1,036,000	
10	Challenge 10	8 May 2022	Sunday 7:00pm	664,000	4	529,000	4	1,193,000	
11	Challenge 11	9 May 2022	Monday 7:30pm	566,000	10	494,000	6	1,060,000	
12	Challenge 12	10 May 2022	Tuesday 7:30pm	609,000	7	517,000	5	1,126,000	
13	Challenge 13	15 May 2022	Sunday 7:00pm	630,000	4	488,000	4	1,118,000	
14	Grand Finale Winners Announced	16 May 2022	Monday 7:30pm Monday 9:00pm	669,000 702,000	8 6	540,000 571,000	6 5	1,209,000 1,273,000	
