= Rock Around the World (TV series) =

Australian music television show (1982–1985)

Rock Around the World was an Australian music television show broadcast by SBS. It was hosted by Basia Bonkowski. It began broadcasting on 4 January 1982 and was axed in 1985 and replaced by Kulture Shock. The program played music videos, and interviews, with more of a focus on European content than other shows.

== See also ==
- List of Australian music television shows
- List of Australian television series
