= Lego Masters =

Television talent show franchise

LEGO Masters
- Original work: Lego Masters (British TV series)
- Owners: The Lego Group; Banijay Entertainment
- Years: 2017–present

Films and television
- Television series: Lego Masters (see international versions)

Miscellaneous
- Genre: Reality television
- First aired: 24 July 2017
- Distributor: Banijay Rights; Tuesday's Child

Lego Masters is an international reality television show in which teams compete to build the best Lego project, based on the British series of that name, which premiered in 2017. Many other countries adapted the format and began airing their own versions starting in 2018. As of 2020, the format is jointly owned by Tuesday's Child, The Lego Group and Banijay.

== International versions ==
=== Overview ===
As of June 2022, 42 winners have been crowned within different versions of Lego Masters.

Franchise with a currently airing season
Franchise with an upcoming season
Franchise with an unknown status
Franchise awaiting confirmation
Franchise that has ceased to air

Country/Region	Title	Network	Seasons and winners	Cash Prize	Presenter(s)	Judge(s)
Australia	Lego Masters	Nine Network	Season 1, 2019: Henry & Cade; Season 2, 2020: Jackson & Alex; Season 3, 2021: David & Gus; Season 4, 2022: Joss & Henry; Season 5, 2023: Scott & Owen; Season 6, 2024: Krystle & Michelle; Season 7, 2025: Henry & Cade; Season 8, 2026: Jackson, Alex T & Fleur	A$100,000 (1-3, 5, 6); A$100,050 (4)	Hamish Blake	Ryan "The Brickman" McNaught
Belgium; Netherlands	Lego Masters	(Belgium) VTM (Netherlands) RTL4	Season 1, 2020: (Netherlands) Jan & Lola; Season 2, 2021: (Netherlands) Roy & Thomas; Season 3, 2022: (Belgium) Tom & Peter; Season 4, 2025: ?	€25,000	Ruben Nicolai & Kürt Rogiers (1-2, 4); Jamai Loman & Andy Peelman (3-)	Bas Brederode (1); Jonathan Bennink (2); Esmee Kuenen (3-)
Czech Republic; Slovakia	Lego Masters	(Czech Republic) TV Nova (Slovakia) Markíza	Season 1, 2022: Michal & Marek	€20,000	Matouš Ruml & Eva Kramerová	Milan Reindl
France	Lego Masters	M6	Season 1, 2021: David & Sébastian; Season 2, 2022: Eric & Alex; Season 3, 2022: Rodolphe & Théo; Season 4, 2023: Augustin & Bertrand; Season 5, 2025: Pierre & Arthur	€20,000	Éric Antoine	Georg Schmitt (1-); Paulina Aubey (1-3); Aveline Stockart (4); Fuchsia d'Enfer (5-)
Finland	Lego Masters	MTV3 (1-2); Ruutu (3)	Season 1, 2022: Tino & Julius; Season 2, 2023: Aura & Oskari; Season 3, 2024: ?	€10,000	Jaakko Saariluoma (1-2); Christoffer Strandberg (3)	Esa Nousiainen
Germany	Lego Masters	RTL	Season 1, 2020: Annalena & Felix; Season 2, 2021: Justin & Dominik	€25,000	Daniel Hartwich	René Hoffmeister; Elisabeth Kahl-Backes (2–)
Hungary	Lego Masters	RTL	Season 1, 2023: Ferenc & Kristóf; Season 2, 2025: Csaba & Vazul	10,000,000 Ft	Péter Puskás-Dallos (1); Dávid Miller (2-)	Balázs Dóczy
Japan	Lego Masters	TBS	Season 1, 2023: Yoon & Yamaguchi	?	Takahiro Inoue & Kanako Momota	Junpei Mitsui; Izumi Mori; Masaru Hamaguchi
Mexico	Lego Masters: México	TV Azteca	Season 1, 2026: TBA	MX$2'000.000	Mauricio Islas	TBA; TBA; TBA
New Zealand	Lego Masters NZ	TVNZ	Season 1, 2022: Glenn & Jake; Season 2, 2023: Oli & Charlie	NZ$25,000 Warehouse voucher plus 2 cars (Fiat 500 Lounge)	Dai Henwood	Robin Sather
Norway	Lego Masters Norge	TV 2	Season 1, 2021: Ebbe & Joakim	kr 500,000	Erik Solbakken	Erik Legernes
Denmark	Lego Masters Denmark	TV2	Season 1, 2021: Magnus & Fredrik; Season 2, 2022: Jakob & Rasmus	None	Victor Lander	Søren Dyrhøj (LEGO Speed Champions Designer)
Poland	Lego Masters	TVN	Season 1, 2020: Rafał Zub & Jakub Pleśniarski; Season 2, 2021: Ryszard Bosiak & Łukasz Górecki; Season 3, 2022: Daniel Voiuiev-Larin & Kasia Świętach; Season 4, 2023: Bartosz Sasiński & Piotr Dryś; Season 5, 2024: Patryk Bejnarowicz & Norbert Grzybowski; Also, there were three celebrity Christmas specials.	PLN 100,000	Marcin Prokop	Aleksandra Mirecka (1–2); Paweł Duda (1); Kamil Bednarek (2); Pola Lisowicz (3–5); Czesław Mozil (3); Wojciech Łozowski "Łozo" (4); Aleksandra Adamska (5)
South Korea	Blockbuster: Genius Brick Battle	MBC	Season 1, 2022: ?	₩30,000,000	Noh Hong-chul	Wani Kim; Jae Won Lee
Spain	Lego Masters	Antena 3	Season 1, 2021: Víctor Boscá & Stefan van den Hoogen	€50,000	Roberto Leal	Eva Hache; Pablo González
Sweden	Lego Masters Sverige	TV4	Season 1, 2020: David Gustafsson & Rickard Stensby; Season 2, 2021: Felix Terman & Vidar Olsson; Season 3, 2022: Emma Friman & Andreas Lenander	?	Mauri Hermundsson	Magnus Göransson
United Kingdom	Lego Masters	Channel 4	Season 1, 2017: Nate & Steve; Season 2, 2018: Paul & Lewis; Christmas Special 2022: Scarlett Moffatt's family	None	Melvin Odoom (1-2); Nish Kumar (Christmas Special 2022)	Matthew Ashton; Roma Agrawal (1); Fran Scott (2); Amy Corbett (Christmas Special 2022)
United States	Lego Masters	Fox	Season 1, 2020: Tyler & Amy; Season 2, 2021: Mark & Steven; Season 3, 2022: Nick & Stacey; Season 4, 2023: Chris & Robert; Season 5, 2025: Sage & Ian; Season 6, TBA: TBA	US$100,000	Will Arnett (1-5); Nick Cannon (6)	Jamie Berard; Amy Corbett
United States	Lego Masters: Celebrity Holiday Bricktacular	Fox	Season 1, 2022: Robin Thicke & Boone; Season 2, 2023: Rob Riggle & Krystle; Season 3, 2024: Sophia Bush & Corey	TBA	Will Arnett	Jamie Berard; Amy Corbett
United States	Lego Masters Jr.	Fox	Season 1, 2025: TBA	TBA	Kelly Osbourne	Amy Corbett; Boone Langston

=== Germany ===
Lego Masters Germany was broadcast by RTL. The first season premiered Sunday 18 November 2018 and ended Sunday 9 December 2018. In each of the four stand-alone episodes, four duos competed. Each episode included two challenges. After the first (unplanned) 2-3 hour challenge, one of the teams dropped out and the other three competed in the second (planned) 6-10 hour challenge for the win in the episode. (Note: In the German series every episode four different teams competed. Each team participated in only one episode, so during the series a total of 16 teams participated. Every episode one of the teams won the title of "Lego-master".)

The series was presented by German presenter Oliver Geissen. Judges were senior Lego developer Juliane Aufdembrink and design professor Paolo Tumminelli.
Every episode another German TV personality announced the challenges and assisted the judges: comedian Lutz van der Horst in episode 1, football personality Reiner Calmund in episodes 2 and 3 and dancer Joachim Llambi in episode 4.

Contestants include notable 'LEGO Community' members such as Christoph Helfenbein from Lego website www.imperiumdersteine.de, Claus-Marc Hahn from www.brickscreations.com, Johann Irl and Roland Bachmaier from Happy Brixx and father and son Wolfgang and Marcel Diaz from YouTube channel Spacebricks.

In January 2020 the casting for the second season started. It had new judges and a new presenter. There were 4 normal seasons and 2 "Winter champion" seasons.

=== Australia ===
An Australian series was commissioned in July 2018 by the Nine Network, and officially confirmed at Nine's Upfronts in October 2018, also announcing the series would be hosted by Hamish Blake and judged by Ryan "The Brickman" McNaught. Auditions opened in June 2018, and Season 1 was screened on the Nine network from 28 April to 14 May 2019. Due to the success of the series, In May 2019 the series was renewed for a second season which filmed later in 2019 and set to air in 2020. On 16 October 2019, the second season was officially confirmed at Nine's upfronts. The second season began airing on 19 April 2020 and ended on 18 May 2020.

On 16 September 2020, the series was renewed for a third season which began airing on 19 April 2021 and ended on 17 May 2021. In April 2021, Nine Network renewed the series for a fourth and fifth season with Blake returning as host for both.. The show was once again renewed for a 6th season, with Blake and McNaught continuing in their roles as host and judge.

=== Netherlands and Belgium ===
A Dutch version (nl) of Lego Masters with participants from Netherlands and Belgium premiered 11 April 2020 on RTL4 in The Netherlands and on VTM in Belgium. The series is presented by the Dutch Ruben Nicolai and Belgian Kürt Rogiers (nl). The judge is senior Lego developer Bas Brederode, who is originally from the Netherlands but currently lives in Billund, Denmark with his family.

On 26 December 2020 a stand-alone Christmas special was broadcast by RTL4 with teams of Dutch celebrities competing for the title of Lego Masters Kerst as well as to raise money for charity Het Vergeten Kind.

In 2021, a second season aired with senior Lego developer Jonathan Bennink as the new Brickmaster. Both Nikolai and Rogiers returned as hosts.

On 15 May 2021 RTL4 aired another special, this time with teams of kids between 7 and 12 years old trying to win the title of Lego Masters Kids and a year of free Lego from a toy store.

In 2022 a third season aired, with new Brickmaster Esmee Kuenen, Senior Element Designer at Lego, and new hosts: the Dutch Jamai Loman and Belgian Andy Peelman (nl).

=== New Zealand ===
A New Zealand version of the show has aired in 2022 on TVNZ. A second season premiered in April 2023.

=== United States ===
An American version of the show is made for Fox. The show premiered 5 February 2020, and is hosted by actor Will Arnett, who also serves as executive producer. The judges, "brickmasters", were Amy Corbett and Jamie Berard. Contestants include notable 'LEGO Community' members Iceberg Bricks and Boone Langston (from Beyond the Brick), both of whom established a fanbase online prior to being cast in the show. A second season premiered in June 2021. A third season premiered in September 2022.

=== China ===
A Chinese version of the show is set to be produced by Long Qing Media for Shenzhen TV.

=== France ===
A French version of the show started on M6 on 23 December 2020.

=== Sweden ===
A Swedish version of the program was broadcast in 2020 on TV4. A second season started airing in 2021.

=== Spain ===
A Spanish version of the show was produced by Shine Iberia for Atresmedia with host Roberto Leal. It premiered on 15 December 2021, but due to poor ratings in its first two weeks, Antena 3 burned off its last three episodes on 29 December.

=== Poland ===
Polish version of the show, called Lego Masters, started to air in 2020.

=== Norway ===
A Norwegian version of the show, called Lego Masters Norge, started to air on TV 2 on 15 October 2021.

=== Denmark ===
A Danish version of Lego Masters was broadcast on TV 2 during spring 2021 with host Victor Lander. Unlike other editions of the program, the Danish version offered no cash prize. Instead, the three builds from the show's freestyle finale were exhibited in Lego House, Denmark. And the winners were built and exhibited as miniland figures in Legoland in Billund.

The show featured judge Søren Dyrhøj, a renowned Lego employee famous among Lego enthusiasts for designing several classic Star Wars sets including the Y-wing Star Fighter, The Death Star, and the Millennium Falcon.

Additionally, a 2-episode Christmas and New Year's special featuring five of the participants from season one, each paired with a Danish celebrity, aired in December 2021.

A second season began airing on 3 September 2022.

=== Czech Republic and Slovakia ===
A Czech and Slovak version of Lego Masters with participants from the Czech Republic and Slovakia is being prepared by TV Nova and TV Markíza. The show will be aired on 5 June 2022, on the Czech TV Nova and Slovak TV Markíza, and on 29 May 2022, on the Voyo.cz and Voyo.sk VOD platforms.
