= Lego Masters Jr. =

American reality competition miniseries

- Presented by: Kelly Osbourne
- Judges: Amy Corbett; Boone Langston
- Country of origin: United States
- Original language: English
- No. of seasons: 1
- No. of episodes: 4

Production
- Executive producers: Pip Wells; Sharon Levy; Michael Heyerman; Karen Smith; Steph Harris; Brad Pitt; Dede Gardner; Jeremy Kleiner; Jill Wilfert; Robert May
- Production companies: Endemol Shine North America; Tuesday's Child; Plan B Entertainment; The Lego Group

Original release
- Network: Fox
- Release: August 18 – September 8, 2025

Related
- Lego Masters

Lego Masters Jr. (stylized as LEGO Masters Jr.) is an American reality competition television series that premiered on Fox on August 18, 2025. It is a spin-off of Lego Masters.

== Host and judges ==
Television personality Kelly Osbourne hosts the series. Like previous seasons of Lego Masters, Amy Corbett serves as one of the two judges. Replacing Jamie Berard is LEGO designer and Lego Masters season 1 finalist, Boone Langston.

== Production ==
On July 7, 2025, a spinoff featuring kids as contestants, titled Lego Masters Jr., was announced. It also announced it would premiere on August 18, 2025.

== Elimination table ==
Place	Team	Kids Relation	Episodes			
Place	Team	Kids Relation	1	2	3	4
1	Ajay, Zak & Alison Sweeney	Brothers	RISK	2ND	WIN	WINNERS
2–3	Will, Crosby & Andy Richter	Neighbors & Best Friends	2ND	RISK	2ND	N/A
2–3	Stella, Chelle & Jordin Sparks	Best Friends	SAFE	WIN	RISK	N/A
4	Vincent, Hudson & Ravi V. Patel	Friends	WIN	SAFE	ELIM	
5	Max, Zoe & Porsha Williams	Siblings	RISK	ELIM		

The team won the challenge.
The team was second this week.
The team was safe from elimination.
The team was at risk of elimination.
The team was eliminated from the competition.

== Episodes ==
No.	Title	Original release date	Prod. code	U.S. viewers (millions)
1	"Disney Train Ride"	August 18, 2025	LMJ-101	0.92
2	"Celebrity Stunt Doubles"	August 25, 2025	LMJ-102	0.90
3	"Harry Potter"	September 1, 2025	LMJ-103	0.72
4	"Ninjago"	September 8, 2025	LMJ-104	0.93
