= Lego Masters (American TV series) season 4 =

Lego Masters
- Season 4
- Promotional poster for season 4, featuring host Arnett
- Hosted by: Will Arnett
- Judges: Jamie Berard; Amy Corbett
- No. of teams: 12
- Winners: Christopher Lee; Robert Zhang
- No. of episodes: 11

Release
- Original network: Fox
- Original release: September 28 – December 14, 2023

Season chronology
- ← Previous; Season 3 Next → Season 5

The fourth season of the American reality competition television series Lego Masters premiered on Fox on September 28, 2023, and concluded on December 14, 2023. The season was won by friends/business partners Christopher & Robert, with mother/son Neena & Sam finishing second, and siblings Paul & Nealita placing third.

== Host and judges ==
Host Will Arnett and judges Jamie Berard and Amy Corbett returned from the previous seasons.

== Production ==
On December 14, 2022, the series was renewed for a fourth season. Alongside the renewal in December 2022, it was announced that Will Arnett would return to host. Casting was done by Raph Korine. On July 11, 2023, it was announced that the fourth season would premiere on September 28, 2023.

== Elimination table ==
Place	Team	Relation	Episodes									
Place	Team	Relation	1	2	3	4	5	6	7	8	9	11
1	Christopher & Robert	Friends/Business Partners	SAFE	SAFE	2ND	SAFE	SAFE	SAFE	WIN	WIN (Note: Christopher & Robert were placed in the top two for winning the aesthetics and pole position part of the challenge.)	WIN	WINNERS
2	Neena & Sam	Mother/Son	WIN	WIN^{†}	RISK	WIN^{†}	SAFE	SAFE	SAFE	SAFE	SAFE	RUNNERS-UP
3	Paul & Nealita	Siblings	SAFE	SAFE	SAFE	SAFE	SAFE	WIN	2ND	SAFE	RISK	THIRD
4	Emilee & Kelly	Friends	RISK	SAFE	SAFE	SAFE	SAFE	2ND	SAFE	RISK	ELIM	
5	Luis & Alex	Friends/Co-Workers	SAFE	2ND	SAFE	2ND	SAFE	SAFE	RISK	ELIM		
6	Allyson & Melanie	Friends	SAFE	SAFE	SAFE	SAFE	SAFE	RISK	ELIM			
7	Aubree & Ryan	Married	SAFE	SAFE	SAFE	RISK	WIN	ELIM				
8	David (Poppy) & Ben	Grandpa/Grandson	SAFE	SAFE	WIN	SAFE	SAFE	WD				
9	Tim & Tim	Friends	SAFE	SAFE	SAFE	ELIM						
10	Chris & Jordan	Friends	SAFE	RISK	ELIM							
11	Karen & Amie	Friends	SAFE	ELIM								
12	Brad & Mike	Married	ELIM									

^{†}Team awarded the Golden Brick.

The team won the challenge.
The team was second this week.
The team was safe from elimination.
The team was safe due to using the Golden Brick.
The team was at risk of elimination.
The team was eliminated from the competition.
The team withdrew from the competition.

== Episodes ==
No. overall	No. in season	Title	Original release date	Prod. code	U.S. viewers (millions)
36	1	"Brick Lake"	September 28, 2023	LEG-401	0.95
For the first challenge of the season, the builders have to make their own party boat. After the build, each boat was tested to see if it can float and move around brick lake. Neena & Sam won the challenge, and nobody was identified as second place in this challenge. Brad & Mike and Emilee & Kelly ended up in the bottom two, with Brad & Mike eliminated for having simple building techniques.
37	2	"Catropolis"	October 5, 2023	LEG-402	0.98
The teams each get a kitten and have to make them a pet palace and they have to put some of the kitten's personalities in their palace. During the build, Will announced that the team with the best build will win the Golden Brick. The top two teams were Luis & Alex and Neena & Sam. Neena & Sam won the challenge and the Golden Brick. The bottom two teams were Chris & Jordan and Karen & Amie, with Karen & Amie eliminated because their build was the smallest in the room.
38	3	"Volcanic Brickruptions"	October 12, 2023	LEG-403	0.91
The teams each have to build a volcano and its story based on the environment that they have picked. The top two teams were David & Ben and Christopher & Robert. David & Ben won the challenge. The bottom two teams were Chris & Jordan and Neena & Sam. Since Neena & Sam didn't activate the golden brick & ended up in the bottom two, they gave back the Golden Brick thus making them the first team to get the brick but not activate it. Chris & Jordan were eliminated because their build neither erupted nor had the special effect in action.
39	4	"Build It By Ear"	October 19, 2023	LEG-404	1.01
The teams each pick a unique sound effect and then they have to build what the sound looks like. During the build, Will announced that the winner will get the golden brick after he reclaimed it in the last episode. The top two teams were Neena & Sam and Luis & Alex. Neena & Sam won the challenge and the Golden Brick for the second time. The bottom two teams were Aubree & Ryan and Tim & Tim, with Tim & Tim eliminated because they had trouble changing their build, in addition to having no 'wow' moment.
40	5	"Cirque du Soleil"	October 26, 2023	LEG-405	1.00
The teams are divided into two super teams of four teams in each. The four teams in each super team have to work together to create their own Cirque du Soleil with four acts in it. Each team has to make one of the four acts in their Cirque du Soleil. During the build, Will announced that the team with the best solo act will win a trip to Las Vegas and tickets to a Cirque du Soleil show of their choice. Before they showed off their build, Will announced that David had to leave since he was not feeling well. The judges had trouble choosing a winning team, so both teams tied for the first time in Lego Masters history. The tie in the competition concluded with no one getting eliminated. Aubree & Ryan had the best solo act of the night, winning them the trip to Las Vegas with the tickets for the Cirque du Soleil show of their choice.
41	6	"Is It Brick?"	November 2, 2023	LEG-406	1.18
Before Will told the builders what the challenge was, he announced that due to health reasons, Poppy & Ben withdrew from the competition. The teams have to take an item from Will's office then have to make an exact replica of it out of lego bricks. During the build, Will said that a special guest will come and try to guess what is real and what is brick. If they can trick the guest they could win the challenge, and if not then they could be in trouble. Before the judges looked at the build, Neena & Sam decided to use the golden brick. After judging the builds and putting them in the office, the special guest was revealed to be the previous season winner Stacey. Stacey managed to guess the TV and the red chair while missing the clarinet, the record player, the telescope, the camera, and the rug. The top two teams were Emilee & Kelly and Paul & Nealita; Paul & Nealita won the challenge. The bottom two teams were Aubree & Ryan and Allyson & Melanie. Aubree & Ryan were eliminated because the screen in their TV build lacked the curves it needed to look adjacent to the real one.
42	7	"Brick Chic"	November 9, 2023	LEG-407	1.12
The teams have to design and build functional and life size designer bags and after the build they will put on a photo shoot with the builders as the models. Each team has to make their bags and their cover photos be based on one of the four seasons. The top two teams were Paul & Nealita and Christopher & Robert. Christopher & Robert won the challenge as well as a copy of brick chic with their picture on the cover. The bottom two teams were Luis & Alex and Allyson & Melanie. Allyson & Melanie went home because their bag was a little basic and the shape didn't work.
43	8	"Lego 2K Drive"	November 16, 2023	LEG-408	1.04
This episode is teamed up with Lego 2K Drive. The teams have to pick one racecar and one water vehicle, then smash them together, then take the pieces and make a new remote control vehicle. For the first time in Lego master history, the brick pit is off limits so the pieces they will use will come from their chosen vehicles. After the build they will race their vehicles on a race track. The best scoring vehicle will get to start in pole position for the race. During the build, Will announces that the winning team will have their Lego car be turned into a playable vehicle in the game. Christopher & Robert won best aesthetics and got to be in pole position, then won the challenge, thus having their Lego car turned into a playable vehicle; no one was announced in second place. The bottom two teams were Luis & Alex and Emilee & Kelly, with Luis & Alex eliminated because they showed too much detail of one of their original vehicles.
44	9	"Roller Coaster Madness"	November 30, 2023	LEG-409	1.02
The teams had to build roller coasters. Each build has to have a mechanical lift and a big drop. Christopher & Robert won the challenge with no one being announced in second place. Emilee & Kelly were eliminated because they didn't have a complex roller coaster design and build compared to the remainder of the builds; despite this, their theme was praised by the judges and Will.
45	10	"Bricks & All"	December 7, 2023	LEG-410	0.81
Lego Masters looks back on the four seasons on some of their favorite brick smashes and crashes, with a total of 100 Lego smashes and crashes reviewed over the four years. Due to how long they made this, we never saw numbers twenty-nine through two.
46	11	"Four-Ever Finale"	December 14, 2023	LEG-411	0.93
The final three teams are Christopher & Robert, Neena & Sam, and Paul & Nealita. They are tasked with making their master build. Before they build, Will announced that along with the trophy, money, and Lego Masters title, the winning team will have their final build turned into a real Lego set. During the build, Will brought the builders' families, and announced that the winning build will be put on display at the Lego flagship store in New York City. Paul & Nealita are declared as third place, leaving the final two as Christopher & Robert, and Neena & Sam. The brickmasters name Christopher & Robert as the winners, taking home $100,000, the Lego Masters trophy, and will have their final build turned into a real Lego set.
