= Lego Masters (Australian TV series) season 7 =

Lego Masters
- Season 7
- Hosted by: Hamish Blake
- Judges: Ryan "The Brickman" McNaught
- No. of teams: 10
- Location: Sydney

Release
- Original network: Nine Network
- Original release: 1 June – 23 June 2025

Season chronology
- ← Previous; Season 6 Next → Season 8

The seventh season of Australian reality television series Lego Masters, titled Lego Masters Australia Grand Masters of the Galaxy, began airing on 1 June 2025. Like the previous series, four Australian teams go up against six international teams who have competed in their own countries. Hamish Blake returned as host along with Ryan "The Brickman" McNaught as judge. The ten teams battle it out to win the title of Australia's LEGO Grand Master and a prize of $100,000.

== Production ==
In October 2024, the series was renewed for a seventh season, which saw the return of past winners and finalists vs international teams who have previously competed in their homelands. In May 2025, season seven was confirmed to premiere on 1 June 2025 and would be titled Grandmasters of the Galaxy, and the contestants also announced with international teams including six international teams from Canada, China, Finland, Sweden, USA and New Zealand.

== Teams ==
| Team | Ages | Relationship | Country | Season | Status |
|---|---|---|---|---|---|
| Henry & Cade | 43 & 42 | Best mates | Australia | Season 1 winners | Winners |
| Trent & Alex | 43 & 28 | Paired together | Australia | Seasons 2 & 5 and Seasons 4 & 5 | Runners up |
| Vidar & Albin | 25 & 23 | Paired together | Sweden | Seasons 2 winner & contestant | Third place |
| Dai & Jiayuan | 35 & 34 | Dynamic duo | China | Season 2 runners-up | Eliminated (Semi-final) |
| Oskari & Aura | 23 & 31 | Quirky pair | Finland | Season 2 winners | Eliminated (Challenge 9) |
| David & G (Gerhard) | 39 & 59 | Former workmates | Australia | Season 1 runners-up | Eliminated (Challenge 8) |
| Nick & Stacey | 32 & 37 | Friends | Canada | Season 3 winners | Eliminated (Challenge 7) |
| Gabby & Owen | 43 & 31 | Paired together | Australia | Seasons 3 & 5 | Eliminated (Challenge 6) |
| Emily & Sarah | 44 & 43 | Team mum | New Zealand | Season 1 runners-up | Eliminated (Challenge 5) |
| Paul & Nealita | 34 & 26 | Siblings | USA | Season 4 third place | Eliminated (Challenge 4) |

== Elimination history ==
Teams' progress through the competition
| Team | Challenge | | | | | | | | | | |
| Team | 1 | 2 | 3 | 4 | 5 | 6 | 7 | 8 | 9 | Semi-final | Grand Finale |
|---|---|---|---|---|---|---|---|---|---|---|---|
| Henry & Cade | Safe | Safe | Top One | Safe | Safe | Safe | Top One | Advantage | Top One | Advantage | Winners |
| Trent & Alex | Safe | Safe | Safe | Safe | Safe | Safe | Safe | Top One | Advantage | Safe | Runners up |
| Vidar & Albin | Safe | Safe | Safe | Safe | Top One | Advantage | Safe | Safe | Safe | Safe | Third place |
| Dai & Jiayuan | Safe | Safe | Safe | Top One | Advantage | Safe | Safe | Safe | Safe | Eliminated | |
| Oskari & Aura | Safe | Top One | Safe | Safe | Safe | Safe | Safe | Safe | Eliminated | | |
| David & G | Safe | Safe | Safe | Safe | Safe | Top One | Advantage | Eliminated | | | |
| Nick & Stacey | Safe | Safe | Safe | Safe | Safe | Safe | Eliminated | | | | |
| Gabby & Owen | Top One | Safe | Safe | Advantage | Safe | Eliminated | | | | | |
| Emily & Sarah | Safe | Top One | Safe | Safe | Eliminated | | | | | | |
| Paul & Nealita | Safe | Safe | Safe | Eliminated | | | | | | | |

Table key
| Advantage | Team received an advantage from Brickman |
| Top One | Team came first place in the challenge or the show |
| Immunity | Team is immune and safe from elimination |
| Safe | Team was safe from elimination after passing a challenge/round. |
| Eliminated | Team was eliminated from the competition |

=== Team scores ===
Teams' scores during the first three builds
| Team | Challenge Score | | | Running total |
| Team | 1 | 2 | 3 | Running total |
| Team | /20 | /20 | /40 | Running total |
|---|---|---|---|---|
| Gabby & Owen | 19 | 16 | 36 | 71 |
| Emily & Sarah | 12 | 24 | 34 | 70 |
| David & G | 16 | 13 | 38 | 67 |
| Dai & Jiayuan | 17 | 16 | 33 | 66 |
| Henry & Cade | 12 | 14 | 39 | 65 |
| Trent & Alex | 13 | 14 | 34 | 61 |
| Vidar & Albin | 13 | 14 | 32 | 59 |
| Nick & Stacey | 15 | 14 | 30 | 59 |
| Oskari & Aura | 0 | 24 | 34 | 58 |
| Paul & Nealita | 0 | 13 | 20 | 33 |

== Series Details ==
=== Challenge 1 ===
- Airdate: 1 June 2025
- Challenge: "Bringing the Word Together" Each of the ten teams has 12 hours to build a ball contraption that transfers a ball from one team's table to the next but reflects their creative talents, but the "dwell time" of the ball on each is important to the story telling. Brickman will score each build out of 20. If the ball does not make it to the next table, the team scores zero.
- Advantage: Playing for scores for the first three builds in order to win "The Magic Brick" which will keep the team safe from the first elimination.

| Team | Lego Design | Score | Result (order of ball through contraption) |
|---|---|---|---|
| Gabby & Owen | Koi pond | 19 | Winner (10) |
| Dai & Jiayuan | Kung fu villiage | 17 | Safe (3) |
| David & G | Mining the earth | 16 | Safe (6) |
| Nick & Stacey | Tour of Canada | 15 | Safe (5) |
| Trent & Alex | Squirrel land | 13 | Safe (2) |
| Vidar & Albin | Alien golf course | 13 | Safe (1) |
| Emily & Sarah | Black hole in space changed to Rainbow & sunshine | 12 | Safe (4) |
| Henry & Cade | Bin chicken run changed to Bin chicken run 2. | 12 | Safe (8) |
| Paul & Nealita | American theme park | 0 | Failed (9) |
| Oskari & Aura | Reindeer sauna | 0 | Failed (7) |

=== Challenge 2 ===
- Airdate: 2 June 2025
- Challenge: "Team Birdman" Each of the five teams (two teams combined picked by randomly combining international and Oceania teams) has eight hours to build an interesting story on an existing glider plane. The glider will be launched from a 10 m high platform, in homage to the Birdman Rally. Brickman will award a score out of 20 for the aesthetics of the build and how it looks flying. The glider that flies the furthest receives a bonus five points from Hamish. Brickman also decides that if the USA and Australian team glider (bald eagle) lands relatively intact using landing wheels, he will award the team an additional five points.
- Advantage: Playing for scores for the first three builds in order to win "The Magic Brick" which will keep the team safe from the first elimination.

| Team | Lego Design | Score | Result (distance) |
|---|---|---|---|
| Oskari & Aura (Finland); Emily & Sarah (NZ) | Flying chicken (purple glider) | 19 (+5) | Winner 17.90 m |
| Dai & Jiayuan (China); Owen & Gabby (Australia) | Chinese dragon (yellow glider) | 16 | Safe 10.40 m |
| Nick & Stacey (Canada); Henry & Cade (Australia) | Medieval dragon (red glider) | 14 | Safe 10.99 m |
| Vidar & Albin (Sweden); Trent & Alex (Australia) | When pigs fly (green glider) | 14 | Safe 10.03 m |
| Paul & Nealita (USA); David & G (Australia) | Bald eagle (blue glider) | 13 | Safe Did not fly |

=== Challenge 3 ===
- Airdate: 3 June 2025
- Challenge: "What's in Toy Store" Each of the ten teams chooses an empty toy package that has the name of a toy with packaging giving clues to the toy to be built. Team NZ, chose first, because they are at the top of the leader board with 36 points. The teams have eight hours for this build and is worth 40 points.
- Advantage: Playing for scores for the first three builds in order to win "The Magic Brick" which will keep the team safe from the first elimination.

| Team | Lego Design | Score | Result |
|---|---|---|---|
| Henry & Cade | Karen doll | 39 | Winner |
| David & G | Brad the Bricklayer | 38 | Safe |
| Gabby & Owen | Pegasus Pastures Playset | 36 | Safe |
| Trent & Alex | Robot Rescue | 34 | Safe |
| Oskari & Aura | Brave Bug Bot | 34 | Safe |
| Emily & Sarah | Kitty's Kitchen | 34 | Safe |
| Dai & Jiayuan | Mars Prospector | 33 | Safe |
| Vidar & Albin | Dino Digger | 32 | Safe |
| Nick & Stacey | Galaxy Gallavanter | 30 | Safe |
| Paul & Nealita | Bulldog Dozer | 20 | Safe |

=== Challenge 4 ===
- Airdate: 8 June 2025
- Challenge: "Is it Fake?" The first elimination gives the ten teams nine hours to attempt to replicate a real object out of Lego from a regional Chinese Restaurant set. Twenty points will be granted by Brickmaster based on difficulty and realism. Sophie Monk will attempt to pick the Lego builds from a distance, but if she cannot pick the build in 90 seconds, the team earns an additional three points.
- Advantage: "The Magic Brick" keeps the team of Gabby and Owen safe from the first elimination.

| Team | Lego Design | Score | Result |
|---|---|---|---|
| Dai & Jiayuan | Three lobsters | 21 (18 + 3) | Winner |
| Henry & Cade | Cash register | 20 (17 + 3) | Safe |
| Gabby & Owen | Chinese dragon pillar | 20 (17 + 3) | Advantage |
| Emily & Sarah | Three deep frying ladles | 20 (17 +3) | Safe |
| David & G | Bonsai tree | 19 (16 + 3) | Safe |
| Oskari & Aura | Lazy Susan and accessories | 18 | Safe |
| Trent & Alex | Silk blossom stems in a vase | 17 (14 + 3) | Safe |
| Vidar & Albin | Lucky cat | 17 | Safe |
| Nick & Stacey | Fish tank ornaments and fish | 17 (14 + 3) | Safe |
| Paul & Nealita | Large lacquer cabinet | 16 (13 + 3) | Eliminated |

=== Challenge 5 ===
- Airdate: 9 June 2025
- Challenge: "What Lurks Beneath" The second elimination gives the nine remaining teams have nine hours to build an above and below design with a base plate fixed to the top and base of a fishtank. The story must be from an assigned historical era from a randomly and the tank will be filled with water.
- Advantage: "The Magic Brick" keeps the team of Dai and Jiayuan safe from the second elimination.

| Team | Lego Minifig | Lego Design | Result |
|---|---|---|---|
| Vidar & Albin | Samuri | Samurai vs the Koi | Winner |
| Oskari & Aura | Knight | The Skeleton King's Gold | Safe |
| Dai & Jiayuan | Egyptian | The Pharaoh's Cat | Advantage |
| Gabby & Owen | Aztec | The Aztec Crocofish | Safe |
| Henry & Cade | Viking | The Viking's Catch | Safe |
| David & G | Cowboy | The Scorpion's Gold | Safe |
| Trent & Alex | Spartan | Attack of the Hydra | Safe |
| Nick & Stacey | Roman | The Ghosts of Rome | Safe |
| Emily & Sarah | Pirate | Rise of the Kraken | Eliminated |

=== Challenge 6 ===
- Airdate: 10 June 2025
- Challenge: "Run the Gauntlet" The third elimination gives the eight teams nine hours to construct booby traps within a base plate world (two bases plates each of tropical island, snowy mountain, jungle and desert) for a remote control vehicle (piloted by Hamish) to navigate through. Teams were ranked on the effectiveness of their booby traps and how well they were hidden.
- Advantage: "The Magic Brick" keeps the team of Vidar and Albin safe from the third elimination.

| Team | Base Plate | Lego Design | Result |
|---|---|---|---|
| David & G | Tropical island | Monkey Business | Winner |
| Oskari & Aura | Desert | Bandit Heist | Safe |
| Vidar & Albin | Desert | Apocalypse City | Advantage |
| Dai & Jiayuan | Tropical island | Zombie Apocalypse | Safe |
| Henry & Cade | Snowy mountain | Abandoned Sawmill | Safe |
| Nick & Stacey | Snowy mountain | Happy Ski Resort | Safe |
| Trent & Alex | Jungle | Animal Escape | Safe |
| Gabby & Owen | Jungle | Ping Pong the Giant Orangutan | Eliminated |

=== Challenge 7 ===
- Airdate: 15 June 2025
- Challenge: "Caught in the Act" The fourth elimination gives the seven teams nine hours to construct a crime on a base plate of a room (lounge room, study, kitchen, greenhouse, garage, music studio and rumpus room). Each room has an item assigned that is to be stolen in a crime. Aesthetics and technical ability as well as story telling are the judging criteria. Sophie Monk is used to determine if the build is understandable without explanation.
- Advantage: "The Magic Brick" keeps the team of David and G safe from the fourth elimination.

| Team | Base Plate | Stolen Item | Lego Design | Result |
|---|---|---|---|---|
| Henry & Cade | Lounge Room | Priceless work of art | The Painting in the Lounge Room | Winner |
| Trent & Alex | Music Studio | Valuable musical instrument | The Grand Piano in the Studio | Safe |
| Vidar & Albin | Greenhouse | Prize winning vegetable | A Carrot in the Greenhouse | Safe |
| David & G | Garage | Vehicle that is not a car | Motorbike in the Garage | Advantage |
| Dai & Jiayuan | Study | Something in a safe | Jewelry in the Study | Safe |
| Oskari & Aura | Rumpus Room | Sporting memoribilia | Tennis Racquet in the Rumpus Room | Safe |
| Nick & Stacey | Kitchen | Christmas lunch | The Christmas lunch in the Kitchen | Eliminated |

=== Challenge 8 ===
- Airdate: 16 June 2025
- Challenge: "Fresh Food Superheroes" The fifth elimination gives the six teams nine hours to create an action scene for a food-based superhero against an archenemy. Superhero minifigs were chosen at random.
- Advantage: "The Magic Brick" keeps the team of Henry and Cade safe from the fifth elimination. This is the last build where the Magic Brick is in play. The winner is guaranteed a spot in the semi-final.

| Team | Minifig | Lego Design | Result |
|---|---|---|---|
| Trent & Alex | Carrot Man | Carrot Man vs Evil Bunny | Winner |
| Henry & Cade | Pea in a Pod | Pea in a Pod vs Fridge Mech | Advantage |
| Dai & Jiayuan | Chili Girl | Chili Girl vs Naughty Mouse | Safe |
| Oskari & Aura | Watermelon Woman | Watermelon Woman vs Fire Monster | Safe |
| Vidar & Albin | Banana Boy | Banana Boy vs Bad Apple | Safe |
| David & G | Captain Corn | Captain Corn vs Buttery Man | Eliminated |

=== Challenge 9 ===
- Airdate: 17 June 2025
- Challenge: "Movie Magic" The sixth elimination gives the five teams seven hours to build life-like models of cars that will star in a movie scene. Each team chooses at random a background to film their car against. Cars will be judged on their realism.
- Advantage: "The Magic Brick" keeps the team of Trent and Alex safe from the sixth elimination. The winner of this build gets an advantage in the semi-finals.

| Team | Background | Lego Design | Result |
|---|---|---|---|
| Henry & Cade | Countryside | 1970s Pickup Truck changed to 1960s Cadillac | Winner |
| Vidar & Albin | Forest | Old Timey 1940s Car | Safe |
| Trent & Alex | Beach | 1950s Americana Convertible | Advantage |
| Dai & Jiayuan | Snow | Sports Car | Safe |
| Oskari & Aura | Desert | Jeep | Eliminated |

=== Semi-final ===
- Airdate: 22 June 2025
- Challenge: "Harry Potter Night of Magic" The seventh elimination and semi-final gives the final four teams eleven hours to construct a build centered around a house from the Harry Potter books. The build consists of a hallway and a room reveal with an exciting suspenseful scene incorporating traits from the house. The houses were randomly assigned by a Lego Sorting Hat.
- Advantage: "The Magic Brick" is no longer in play, however Brickman gives the team of Henry and Cade an "advantage" of one hour of help from Sophie Monk.

| Team | Hogwarts House | Lego Design | Result |
|---|---|---|---|
| Vidar & Albin | Slytherin | Slytherin and the Skeleton | Safe |
| Henry & Cade | Gryffindor | Griffin Saves the Day | Safe |
| Trent & Alex | Ravenclaw | Troll in the Library | Safe |
| Dai & Jiayuan | Hufflepuff | Dragon in the Common Room | Eliminated |

=== Grand Finale ===
- Airdate: 23 June 2025
- Grand Finale Challenge: "Free Build" The final three teams have only 28 hours to build whatever they choose. Whoever wins most of the public vote and Brickman's will gain $100,000 and the glory of being the best in the galaxy.
- Voting and Judgement: 200 members of the public, along with Brickman, will determine the ultimate winners. Brickman's vote is worth 100 votes.

| Team | Lego Design | Result |
|---|---|---|
| Henry & Cade | Spartans vs Hydra | Winners |
| Trent & Alex | Dogzilla | Runners up |
| Vidar & Albin | A Child's Imagination | Third place |

== Ratings ==
Viewership data focuses on National Reach and National Total ratings instead of the five metro centres and overnight shares.

| No. | Title | Air date | Timeslot | National reach viewers | National total viewers | Night rank | Ref(s) |
|---|---|---|---|---|---|---|---|
| 1 | Challenge 1 | 1 June 2025 | Sunday 7:00 pm | 2,193,000 | 873,000 | 2 | |
| 2 | Challenge 2 | 2 June 2025 | Monday 7:30 pm | 2,041,000 | 868,000 | 3 | |
| 3 | Challenge 3 | 3 June 2025 | Tuesday 7:30 pm | 1,779,000 | 716,000 | 3 | |
| 4 | Challenge 4 | 8 June 2025 | Sunday 7:00 pm | 1,856,000 | 781,000 | 3 | |
| 5 | Challenge 5 | 9 June 2025 | Monday 7:30 pm | 1,653,000 | 680,000 | 5 | |
| 6 | Challenge 6 | 10 June 2025 | Tuesday 7:30 pm | 1,573,000 | 741,000 | 5 | |
| 7 | Challenge 7 | 15 June 2025 | Sunday 7:00 pm | 2,327,000 | 882,000 | 3 | |
| 8 | Challenge 8 | 16 June 2025 | Monday 7:30 pm | 1,818,000 | 765,000 | 3 | |
| 9 | Challenge 9 | 17 June 2025 | Tuesday 7:30 pm | 1,662,000 | 717,000 | 3 | |
| 10 | Semi-final | 22 June 2025 | Sunday 7:00 pm | 2,104,000 | 899,000 | 3 | |
| 11 | Grand Finale | 23 June 2025 | Monday 7:30 pm | 1,767,000 | 850,000 | 3 | |
