= Lego Masters (Australian TV series) season 6 =

Lego Masters
- Season 6
- Hosted by: Hamish Blake
- Judges: Ryan "The Brickman" McNaught
- No. of teams: 8
- Location: Sydney

Release
- Original network: Nine Network
- Original release: 14 April – 7 May 2024

Season chronology
- ← Previous; Season 5 Next → Season 7

The sixth season of Australian reality television series Lego Masters, titled Lego Masters Australia vs The World, began airing on 14 April 2024. Unlike previous series’, four new Australian teams have gone up against four international teams who have competed in their own countries. Hamish Blake returned as host along with Ryan "The Brickman" McNaught as judge. The eight teams battle it out to win the title of Australia's LEGO Master and a prize of $100,000.

== Production ==
In September 2023, the series was renewed by Nine for a sixth season, titled Lego Masters Australia vs The World, which would feature four new Australian teams and four teams who have previously competed in their homelands. The contestants were announced on 5 April 2024 and the season premiered on 14 April 2024.

== Teams ==
Team	Ages	Relationship	Country/ Season	Status
Krystle & Michelle	36 & 44	Paired together	USA: Season 1 & Season 2	Winners
Felix & Annalena	21 & 27	Fitness fanatic friends	Germany: Season 1 Winners	Runners up
Dianne & Shane	59 & 38	Mother & Son	Australia	Eliminated (Challenge 12)
Ben & Eric	24 & 21	Friends	Australia	Eliminated (Challenge 11)
Peter & Ida	41 & 33	Friends	Denmark: Season 2 runners-up	Eliminated (Challenge 10)
Charlie & Haley	19 & 25	Paired together	Australia	Eliminated (Challenge 7)
Camille & Caroline	34 & 22	Siblings	France: Season 3 contestants	Eliminated (Challenge 4)
Sam & Emilio	Both 38	Brick Artist & Visual Merchandiser	Australia	Eliminated (Challenge 3)

== Elimination history ==
Teams' progress through the competition
Team	Challenge											
Team	1	2	3	4	5	6	7	8	9	10	11	GF
Krystle & Michelle	Safe	Safe	Top two	Safe	Safe	Top One	Top two	Safe	Top One	Immunity	Safe	Winners
Felix & Annalena	Top One	Top One	Top One	Top One	Immunity	Safe	Top One	Safe	Safe	Safe	Safe	Runners up
Diane & Shane	Safe	Safe	Safe	Safe	Safe	Top One	Immunity	Top Two	Top Two	Top One	Top One	Eliminated
Ben & Eric	Safe	Safe	Bottom two	Safe	Safe	Safe	Safe	Top One	Immunity	Safe	Eliminated	
Peter & Ida	Top two	Top One	Immunity	Top two	Top One	Safe	Bottom two	Safe	Safe	Eliminated		
Charlie & Haley	Safe	Safe	Safe	Bottom two	Safe	Safe	Eliminated					
Camille & Caroline	Safe	Safe	Safe	Eliminated								
Sam & Emilio	Safe	Safe	Eliminated									

Table key
Advantage	Team received an advantage from Brickman
Top One	Team came first place in the challenge or the show
Immunity	Team is immune and safe from elimination
Safe	Team was safe from elimination after passing a challenge/round.
Eliminated	Team was eliminated from the competition

== Series Details ==
=== Challenge 1 ===
- Airdate: 14 April 2024
- **Challenge: "Break the Ice"** Each of the eight teams has 14 hours to build on a round plate something that looks "cool" smashing through an ice field. It must be strong enough to withstand breaking through the ice. All builds made it through the ice, so the result was based on the story created by the build.
- Advantage: Playing for "The Big Brick" which will confer advantages in a future challenge.

Team	Lego Design	Result
Felix & Annalena	Dragon and castle	Winner
Peter & Ida	Reaching for the stars (penguin on a rocketship)	Top two
Sam & Emilio	Sea monster	Safe
Krystle & Michelle	Spring rising (vintage TV with two fairies inside)	Safe
Camille & Caroline	Cecile the deep-sea diving pencil	Safe
Ben & Eric	Viking village attack	Safe
Diane & Shane	Blooming flower	Safe
Charlie & Haley	Lava monster	Safe

=== Challenge 2 ===
- Airdate: 15 April 2024
- **Challenge: "Go-Kart"** Four teams of four as chosen by the winners of Challenge 1 (two Australian teams and two international teams) have eight hours and one minute to build the exterior of a go-kart chassis (Segway Ninebot GoKart). Brickman scores the build out of 10 for aesthetics and Hamish Blake awards three bonus points to the winner of the go-kart race (no go-kart made it through the race intact, so no points were awarded). Special guest judge Sophie Monk.
- Advantage: The four players of the winning team win two "Big Bricks" which will confer an advantage in a future challenge.

Team (go-kart driver in bold)	Lego Design	Score (10)	Result
Felix & **Annalena**; Peter & Ida	Hot Dog (Wiener Wagon)	8	Winner
Krystle & **Michelle**; Camille & Caroline	Green Frog	7	Safe
Ben & Eric; **Charlie** & Haley	Pink Dream Car	7	Safe
**Diane** & Shane; Sam & Emilio	Banana Split	6.5	Safe

=== Challenge 3 ===
- Airdate: 16 April 2024
- **Elimination Challenge: "Twisted Tales"** The first elimination challenge has the eight teams construct fairy tales with a twist over 10 hours. Fairy tales and genres are combined by random choice, but the holders of the Big Brick chose their combinations first. The holders of the Big Brick are also immune from elimination
- Advantage: The winning team wins "The Big Brick" which will confer an advantage in a future challenge.

Team	Lego Design	Result
Peter & Ida	Science fiction and Beauty and the Beast	Immunity (TBB)
Felix & Annalena	Horror and Little Red Riding Hood	Winner
Krystle & Michelle	Western and Cinderella	Top Two
Diane & Shane	Action and The Wizard of Oz	Safe
Charlie & Haley	Martial arts and Goldilocks and the Three Bears	Safe
Camille & Caroline	Crime and Alice in Wonderland	Safe
Ben & Eric	Sword & Sorcery and Rapunzel	Bottom Two
Sam & Emilio	Historical epic and Peter Pan	Eliminated

=== Challenge 4 ===
- Airdate: 21 April 2024
- **Elimination Challenge: "What's Real in the Boulangerie?"** Another elimination as the seven teams have nine hours to attempt to replicate a real object from a boulangerie out of Lego. The holders of the TBB have 30 seconds before everyone else to choose their object. Teams were able to swap their choice if necessary after one hour. Brickman awards points out of 20 and an extra 3 points are available if the replica fools the not so special guest judge Sophie Monk (who has one minute to find the replicas).
- Advantage: The winning team wins "The Big Brick" which will confer an advantage in a future challenge.

Team	Lego Design	Score (20)	Result
Felix & Annalena	Suitcases and wool	21 (18 + 3)	Winner
Peter & Ida	Cupcakes on a stand (switched from a cross-stich)	20 (17 + 3)	Top Two
Ben & Eric	Chessboard	17	Safe
Diane & Shane	Painting of ballerinas (switched from wheelbarrow)	16	Safe
Krystle & Michelle	Vintage radio	16	Safe
Charlie & Haley	Sidetable	16 (13 + 3)	Safe
Camille & Caroline	Cake on a stand	15	Eliminated

=== Challenge 5 ===
- Airdate: 22 April 2024
- **Challenge: "Brickbot Battle"** The six teams have six hours to build a fighting robot, or brickbot, that must do battle (push out of arena, pop the balloon or move it into a trap door) in the Brickbot Arena. Themes are determined by minifigs. The chassis is pre-built out of Lego bricks. Teams are also given a drawing pin to help pop the balloon. The holders of the TBB choose the three one on one battle contestants. The winner of each battle then have a three brickbot grand final.
- Advantage: The winning team wins "The Big Brick" which will confer an advantage in a future challenge.

Team	Minifig	Lego Design	1 on 1 Battle	Grand Final Battle
Felix & Annalena	The boxer	Boxing Ring and Punching Gloves	Round 1 Winner	Immunity (TBB)
Peter & Ida	Shark boy	Stingray	Round 3 Winner	Winner
Ben & Eric	Alien warrior	Alien Warrior Head	Round 2 Winner	Lost
Diane & Shane	Caveman	Caveman Car	Round 3 Loser	n/a
Krystle & Michelle	Minotaur	Texas Minotaur Truck	Round 2 Loser	n/a
Charlie & Haley	The fly	Fly Head Car	Round 1 Loser	n/a

=== Challenge 6 ===
- Airdate: 23 April 2024
- **Challenge: "Display Window"** Three teams of four have eight hours to build a visual spectacular that will be displayed in a real-life K-Mart Store. The build needs to large enough to fill the window and hold the attention of passers by. The holders of TBB selected the teams (which had to have one Australian team and one international team). One hundred members of the public (including Sophie Monk) will vote for the winning build. Parts of this episode were filmed at Bondi Junction in November 2023, prior to the 2024 Bondi incident.
- Advantage: The winning team wins two "Big Bricks" which will confer an advantage in a future challenge.

Team	Lego Design	Result
Michelle & Krystle; Dianne & Shane	Lego Theme Park	Winner
Felix & Annalena; Charlie & Haley	Underwater World	Safe
Ben & Eric; Peter & Ida	Monkey Business	Safe

=== Challenge 7 ===
- Airdate: 28 April 2024
- **Challenge: "What's on the Box?"** In the third elimination, the six teams are given ten hours to build a recognisable scene from a classic television show in a pre-made hollow vintage TV. Sophie Monk attempts to identify the shows without any hints for a bonus 3 points. The holders of TBB are safe from elimination.
- Advantage: The winning team wins "The Big Brick" which will confer an advantage in a future challenge.

Team	Lego Design	Score (20)	Result
Felix & Annalena	Dora the Explorer	20 (17+3)	Winner
Michelle & Krystle	F.R.I.E.N.D.S.	19 (16+3)	Top Two
Ben & Eric	Scooby Doo	17 (14+3)	Safe
Dianne & Shane	Happy Days	incomplete build	Immunity (TBB)
Peter & Ida	Baywatch	16 (13+3)	Bottom Two
Charlie & Haley	SpongeBob SquarePants	15 (12+3)	Eliminated

=== Challenge 8 ===
- Airdate: 29 April 2024
- **Challenge: "New Olympic Sports"** The teams have nine hours to pitch brand-new sports to be included in the Olympic Games by building visual representations of the wacky new Olympic sports. Teams are assigned the title of the new sports and have to invent the rules. The holders of the TBB assign the sports to the teams. Hamish demonstrates each sport to Brickman.
- Advantage: The winning team wins "The Big Brick" which will confer an advantage in a future challenge.

Team	Lego Design	Result
Ben & Eric	Jet Pack Hockey	Winner
Dianne & Shane	Cake Launching	Top Two
Felix & Annalena	Elephant Jumping	Safe
Peter & Ida	Iron Neck	Safe
Michelle & Krystle	Banana Sledding	Safe

=== Challenge 9 ===
- Airdate: 30 April 2024
- **Challenge: "Colossal World"** Teams are each given a base plate representing a typical room in a house and have 10 hours build minifigures living in the land of the giants surrounded by and using life-size items found around the home. The holders of TBB choose the rooms for all team members.
- Advantage: The winning team wins "The Big Brick" which sends them straight to the semi-finals.

Team	Lego Design	Result
Michelle & Krystle	Retro Movie Night – Living Room	Winner
Dianne & Shane	Baking Gone Wrong – Kitchen	Top Two
Ben & Eric	Battle for the Bedroom	Safe
Felix & Annalena	The Castle and the Rat – Cheese Fight Dining Room	Safe
Peter & Ida	Potty Training – Bathroom	Safe

=== Challenge 10 ===
- Airdate: 5 May 2024
- **Challenge: "Villain Vehicle"** In the fourth elimination, as part of the 85th anniversary of DC's Batman, the teams have eight hours to create iconic vehicles for some of Batman's greatest foes to earn a spot into the Semi Finals. Each team is given an iconic Batman villain, the challenge is to build the vehicle and build a good vs evil battle scene in the pre-made Gotham City (mini-figure scale). The holder's of the TBB have immunity and get to assign villains to the remaining teams.

Team	Lego Design	Result
Dianne & Shane	The Joker	Winner
Michelle & Krystle	Harley Quinn	Immunity (TBB)
Felix & Annalena	The Riddler	Safe
Ben & Eric	Poison Ivy	Safe
Peter & Ida	The Penguin	Eliminated

=== Challenge 11 ===
- Airdate: 6 May 2024
- **Challenge: "Lily Pad"** The final four teams have 10 hours to build a scene on a floating lily pad (pre-made floating green base), featuring a specific colour palette, to earn a place in the Grand Final. The colours were chosen by Brickman to test complementary colour choices. The technical challenge is that the build must float evenly in the pond on the lily pad. The winners of the Batman Villain Vehicle challenge choose the colours for all the teams.

Team	Colour	Lego Design	Result
Dianne & Shane	Yellow	Fishing giraffe	Safe
Felix & Annalena	Light Blue	Lizard	Safe
Michelle & Krystle	Purple	Butterfly	Safe
Ben & Eric	Pink	Bonsai tree and fairy village	Eliminated

=== Grand Finale ===
- Airdate: 7 May 2024
- **Challenge: "Grand Finale"** The final three teams have 28 hours to create a build of their choosing.
- Voting and Judgement: 200 members of the public, along with Brickman, will determine the ultimate winners of LEGO® Masters 2024. Brickman has the Golden Brick worth 100 votes.

Team	Lego Design	Result
Michelle & Krystle	Artist Studio (life size with minifig chaos)	Winners
Felix & Annalena	Fairy Villiage (with white wolf mythical creature)	Runners up
Dianne & Shane	Final Frontier (crashed spaceship and floating alien castle)	Third place

== Ratings ==
On 28 January 2024, OzTAM's rating data recording system changed. Viewership data then focused on National Reach and National Total ratings instead of the five metro centres and overnight shares.

No.	Title	Air date	Timeslot	National reach viewers	National total viewers	Night rank	Ref(s)
1	Challenge 1	14 April 2024	Sunday 7:00 pm	2,200,000	874,000	3	
2	Challenge 2	15 April 2024	Monday 7:30 pm	1,929,000	785,000	3	
3	Challenge 3	16 April 2024	Tuesday 7:30 pm	1,528,000	669,000	5	
4	Challenge 4	21 April 2024	Sunday 7:00 pm	2,002,000	795,000	4	
5	Challenge 5	22 April 2024	Monday 7:30 pm	1,752,000	728,000	3	
6	Challenge 6	23 April 2024	Tuesday 7:30 pm	1,617,000	689,000	4	
7	Challenge 7	28 April 2024	Sunday 7:00 pm	2,054,000	852,000	4	
8	Challenge 8	29 April 2024	Monday 7:30 pm	1,783,000	707,000	3	
9	Challenge 9	30 April 2024	Tuesday 7:30 pm	1,517,000	709,000	5	
10	Challenge 10	5 May 2024	Sunday 7:00 pm	1,972,000	799,000	4	
11	Challenge 11	6 May 2024	Monday 7:30 pm	1,702,000	725,000	4	
12	Grand Finale	7 May 2024	Tuesday 7:30 pm	1,919,000	848,000	3	
