= Lego Masters (American TV series) season 5 =

Lego Masters
- Season 5
- Promotional poster for season 5, featuring host Arnett
- Hosted by: Will Arnett
- Judges: Jamie Berard; Amy Corbett
- No. of teams: 11
- Winners: Ian; Sage
- No. of episodes: 10

Release
- Original network: Fox
- Original release: May 19 – July 28, 2025

Season chronology
- ← Previous; Season 4

The fifth season of the American reality competition television series Lego Masters premiered on Fox on May 19, 2025 and concluded on July 28, 2025. The season was won by siblings Ian & Sage, with brothers Ben & Michael finishing second, and coach & band director Anthony & Joe placing third.

== Host and judges ==
Actor and comedian Will Arnett, who starred in various Lego films as Batman, hosts the series. Like previous seasons, Jamie Berard and Amy Corbett serve as judges. This is the final season to be hosted by Arnett.

== Production ==
On September 13, 2023, ahead of the season four premiere, it was announced that the series had been renewed for a fifth season. On April 24, 2025, it was announced that the fifth season would premiere on May 19, 2025.

== Elimination table ==
| Place | Team | Relation | Episodes | | | | | | | | | |
| Place | Team | Relation | 1 | 2 | 3 | 4 | 5 | 6 | 7 | 8 | 9 | 10 |
|---|---|---|---|---|---|---|---|---|---|---|---|---|
| 1 | Ian & Sage | Siblings | 2ND | SAFE | SAFE | SAFE | RISK | 2ND | 2ND | WIN | SAFE | WINNERS |
| 2 | Ben & Michael | Brothers | WIN | SAFE | 2ND | WIN | RISK | 2ND | RISK | SAFE | RISK | RUNNERS-UP |
| 3 | Anthony & Joe | Coach & Band Director | SAFE | RISK | WIN^{†} | SAFE | 2ND | SAFE | WIN | SAFE | WIN | THIRD |
| 4 | Corey & Rebecca | Wedding DJs | SAFE | RISK | SAFE | SAFE | WIN | SAFE | SAFE | RISK | ELIM | |
| 5 | Anne & Luke | Mother & Son | SAFE | SAFE (Note: Anne & Luke and Maia & Jamie built the tallest cake, saving them from elimination.) | SAFE | SAFE | 2ND | WIN^{†} | SAFE | ELIM | | |
| 6 | Maia & Jamie | Daughter & Father | SAFE | SAFE | SAFE | SAFE | 2ND | RISK | ELIM | | | |
| 7 | John & Justin | Friends | SAFE | WIN | SAFE | 2ND | RISK | ELIM | | | | |
| 8 | Niki & Brittain | Sisters | SAFE | WIN | SAFE | RISK | ELIM | | | | | |
| 9 | Alex & Tone | Siblings | SAFE | RISK | RISK | ELIM | | | | | | |
| 10 | Marcella & Krista | Pittsburgh Pals | RISK | RISK | ELIM | | | | | | | |
| 11 | Nick & Kyndall | Brother & Sister | ELIM | | | | | | | | | |

^{†}Team awarded the Golden Brick.

The team won the challenge.
The team was second this week.
The team was safe from elimination.
The team was safe due to using the Golden Brick.
The team was at risk of elimination.
The team was eliminated from the competition.

== Episodes ==
| No. overall | No. in season | Title | Original release date | Prod. code | U.S. viewers (millions) |
|---|---|---|---|---|---|
| 47 | 1 | "Rebuild the Galaxy" | May 19, 2025 | LEG-501 | 0.92 |
For the first challenge of the season, the builders have to take the remains of destroyed lego planets and transform them into the most incredible worlds we have ever seen. With around two hours left, a Stormtrooper broke the clock, which means the builders will have to guess when time is up. The top two teams are Ben & Michael and Ian & Sage. Ben & Michael won the challenge with their functional build. The bottom two teams are Nick & Kyndall and Marcella & Krista. Nick & Kyndall were eliminated for their poor time management and having a small build.
| 48 | 2 | "Wedding Cakes" | May 26, 2025 | LEG-502 | 0.98 |
The teams have to pick a box that has two minifigures in it and have to make a wedding cake based on the two minifigures they picked. The teams who picked the same minifigures are going to work together to make their cake; the grouped team who makes the tallest cake will be safe from elimination. With around 45 minutes left, Will announces that they would be closing the brick pit within five minutes. The grouped team with the tallest cake is Anne & Luke and Maia & Jamie, which saved them from elimination. The grouped team that made the best cake is John & Justin and Niki & Brittain. The bottom two grouped teams are Alex & Tone and Marcella & Krista, alongside Corey & Rebecca and Anthony & Joe. At the end of the night, no one was eliminated.
| 49 | 3 | "Over the Falls" | June 2, 2025 | LEG-503 | 0.99 |
The teams have to build a unique and exciting creature that they will send down a little waterfall in super slow motion. With four hours left in the challenge, Will announced that the Golden Brick is back, but the builders get to pick who gets it via voting - The Brickmasters would say who the top two teams are, with the builders voting between the two. The top two teams were Anthony & Joe and Ben & Michael; after voting, Anthony & Joe won and got the Golden Brick. The bottom two teams were Marcella & Krista and Alex & Tone. Marcella & Krista were eliminated because their build was fragile, breaking before going over the falls.
| 50 | 4 | "Wicked" | June 9, 2025 | LEG-504 | 1.01 |
The teams have to pick a spell book that has a good or wicked spell in them, and use the spell as an inspiration for their build. At around three hours and fifteen minutes left, Will did a "spell," giving the teams an additional 30 minutes. Before they started showing the builds, Anthony & Joe decided to use the Golden Brick, saving them from elimination. The top two teams were John & Justin and Ben & Michael, with Ben & Michael winning the challenge. The bottom two teams were Niki & Brittain and Alex & Tone. Alex & Tone were eliminated because the face they made failed to function, and the function itself was obscure.
| 51 | 5 | "Get in Gear" | June 16, 2025 | LEG-505 | 1.00 |
The teams have to take a Lego moving machine (twist, swing, push, and spin) and use it to inspire their build. For the first time in Lego Masters, the builders went head-to-head, with each face-off having a team that could win the challenge and a team that could go home. The four face-off winners were Corey & Rebecca, Anne & Luke, Maia & Jamie, and Anthony & Joe; of the four face-off winners, the winning team was Corey & Rebecca. Niki & Brittain were eliminated because their motion didn't have the same impact as the others.
| 52 | 6 | "Batman" | June 23, 2025 | LEG-506 | 0.95 |
The teams have to take one of the Batman movies or TV shows and use it as inspiration to build a Batmobile. With a little less than five hours left, Will announced that the winner of the challenge will get the Golden Brick. Amy announced that the top three teams were Ben & Michael, Ian & Sage, and Anne & Luke. Anne & Luke won the challenge along with the Golden Brick. The bottom two teams were John & Justin and Maia & Jamie. John & Justin were eliminated because of their function failing to work and poor polishing details.
| 53 | 7 | "Masquerade" | July 7, 2025 | LEG-507 | 0.95 |
The teams have to make a mask that goes with the outfit they picked. When they are done, one of the two builders will put on the outfit and their mask and have to walk down the middle of the room. Before they put on their outfits and masks, Anne & Luke decided to turn in the Golden Brick, saving them from elimination. The top two teams awere Anthony & Joe and Ian & Sage; Anthony & Joe won the challenge. The bottom two were Ben & Michael and Maia & Jamie. Maia & Jamie were eliminated because the box in the back didn't work with the dragon face; despite this, the features on the dragon's face were praised.
| 54 | 8 | "Is it Brick? 90's Edition" | July 14, 2025 | LEG-508 | 0.93 |
Just like the previous 'Is it Brick?' episode, the teams have to take an item from Will's bedroom and create an exact replica of it out of lego bricks. After the build, they will put them back in the room and a special guest will come and try to guess what is real and what is brick. After judging the builds and putting them in the bedroom, the special guest was revealed to be season two winners Mark & Steven Erickson. Mark managed to guess the guitar, skateboard, amp, and bed, but not the keyboard. The winning team was Ian & Sage. The bottom two teams were Anne & Luke and Corey & Rebecca. Anne & Luke were eliminated because their build was not only incomplete, but because Mark & Steven managed to easily pick their build.
| 55 | 9 | "Great Ball Contraptions" | July 21, 2025 | LEG-509 | 0.95 |
The teams have to make a contraption that moves a ping pong ball from one build to another teams build, with a goal to get the ball to go through all four builds, going from one end of the studio to the other. The first team in the finale was Anthony & Joe, followed by Sage & Ian. Corey & Rebecca were eliminated because the ball stalled twice on their contraption, and the judges thought they their story details weren't polished enough. This left Ben & Michael as the third and final team into the Hall of Fame Finale.
| 56 | 10 | "Hall of Fame Finale" | July 28, 2025 | LEG-510 | 1.08 |
The final three teams are Ben & Michael, Anthony & Joe, & Ian & Sage, being given 18 hours to build their master builds. During the build, Will announced that the winning build will be put on display at Legoland New York, then brought out the families of the three remaining teams. Anthony & Joe are declared as third place, leaving the final two as Ian & Sage, and Ben & Michael. The Brickmasters name Ian & Sage as the winners, taking home $100,000 and the Lego Masters trophy and title.
