= Lego Masters: Celebrity Holiday Bricktacular =

American reality competition television series

- Presented by: Will Arnett
- Judges: Jamie Berard; Amy Corbett
- Country of origin: United States
- Original language: English
- No. of seasons: 3
- No. of episodes: 12

Production
- Executive producers: Karen Smith; Steph Harris; Sharon Levy; DJ Nurre; Michael Heyerman; Brad Pitt; Dede Gardner; Jeremy Kleiner; Christina Oh; Jill Wilfert; Robert May; Will Arnett
- Production companies: Endemol Shine North America; Tuesday's Child; Plan B Entertainment; The Lego Group; Electric Avenue

Original release
- Network: Fox
- Release: December 19, 2022 – December 17, 2024

Related
- Lego Masters

Lego Masters: Celebrity Holiday Bricktacular (stylized as LEGO Masters: Celebrity Holiday Bricktacular) is an American reality competition television series that premiered on Fox on December 19, 2022. It is a spin-off of Lego Masters.

In December 2022, the series was renewed for a second season which premiered on December 18, 2023.

In September 2023, the series was renewed for a third season which premiered on December 10, 2024.

== Format ==
Beloved celebrities and former Lego Masters contestants form teams to compete in holiday brick-building challenges. The winning team receives $20,000 for their chosen charity and the LEGO Masters: Holiday Showdown title.

== Production ==
On May 16, 2022, it was announced that Fox had ordered the series. The series premiered on December 19, 2022.

On December 14, 2022, it was announced that the series had been renewed for a second season which premiered on December 18, 2023.

On September 13, 2023, it was announced that the series had been renewed for a third season which premiered on December 10, 2024.

== Elimination table ==
=== Season 1 (2022) ===
Place	Team	Episodes		
Place	Team	1	2	3
1	Robin & Boone	2ND	2ND	WINNERS
2	Cheryl & Dom	WIN	SAFE	RUNNERS-UP
3	Finesse & Natalie	SAFE	SAFE	THIRD
4	Leslie & Mel	SAFE	WIN	FOURTH

=== Season 2 (2023) ===
Place	Team	Episodes			
Place	Team	1	2	3	4
1	Rob & Krystle	2ND	2ND	SAFE	WINNERS
2	NeNe & Caleb	SAFE	SAFE	2ND	RUNNERS-UP
3	Marshawn & Dave	WIN	SAFE	WIN	THIRD
4	Kelly & Randall	SAFE	WIN	SAFE	FOURTH

=== Season 3 (2024) ===
Place	Team	Episodes			
Place	Team	1	2	3	4
1	Sophia & Corey	SAFE	SAFE	2ND	WINNERS
2–4	Eric & Christine	SAFE	2ND	SAFE	N/A
2–4	Holly & Aaron	2ND	WIN	WIN	N/A
2–4	Lil Rel & Stephen	WIN	SAFE	2ND	N/A

== Episodes ==
Season	Episodes	Originally released	
Season	Episodes	First released	Last released
1	4	December 19, 2022	December 21, 2022
2	4	December 18, 2023	December 19, 2023
3	4	December 10, 2024	December 17, 2024

=== Season 1 (2022) ===
No. overall	No. in season	Title	Original release date	Prod. code	U.S. viewers (millions)
1	1	"Soaring Snowmobiles"	December 19, 2022	LEG-314	1.21
2	2	"Sleigh It!"	December 20, 2022	LEG-315	1.34
3–4	3–4	"Finale"	December 21, 2022	LEG-316/317	1.14

=== Season 2 (2023) ===
No. overall	No. in season	Title	Original release date	Prod. code	U.S. viewers (millions)
5	1	"Candy Cane Express"	December 18, 2023	LEG-412	0.77
6	2	"Holiday Blockbusters"	December 18, 2023	LEG-413	0.77
7	3	"Let It Snow"	December 19, 2023	LEG-414	0.84
8	4	"Brickmas Carols"	December 19, 2023	LEG-415	0.84

=== Season 3 (2024) ===
No. overall	No. in season	Title	Original release date	Prod. code	U.S. viewers (millions)
9	1	"Home Alone"	December 10, 2024	LEG-515	0.93
10	2	"Reindeer Replacement"	December 10, 2024	LEG-516	0.93
11	3	"Winter Break"	December 17, 2024	LEG-517	1.09
12	4	"New Holiday Classics"	December 17, 2024	LEG-518	1.09

== Ratings ==
Lego Masters: Celebrity Holiday Bricktacular : U.S. viewers per episode (thousands)

Season	Episode number			
Season	1	2	3	4
1	1210	1340	1140	1140
2	770	770	840	840
3	930	930	1090	1090

Audience measurement performed by Nielsen Media Research
