= Stacey Roy =

Canadian actor and producer

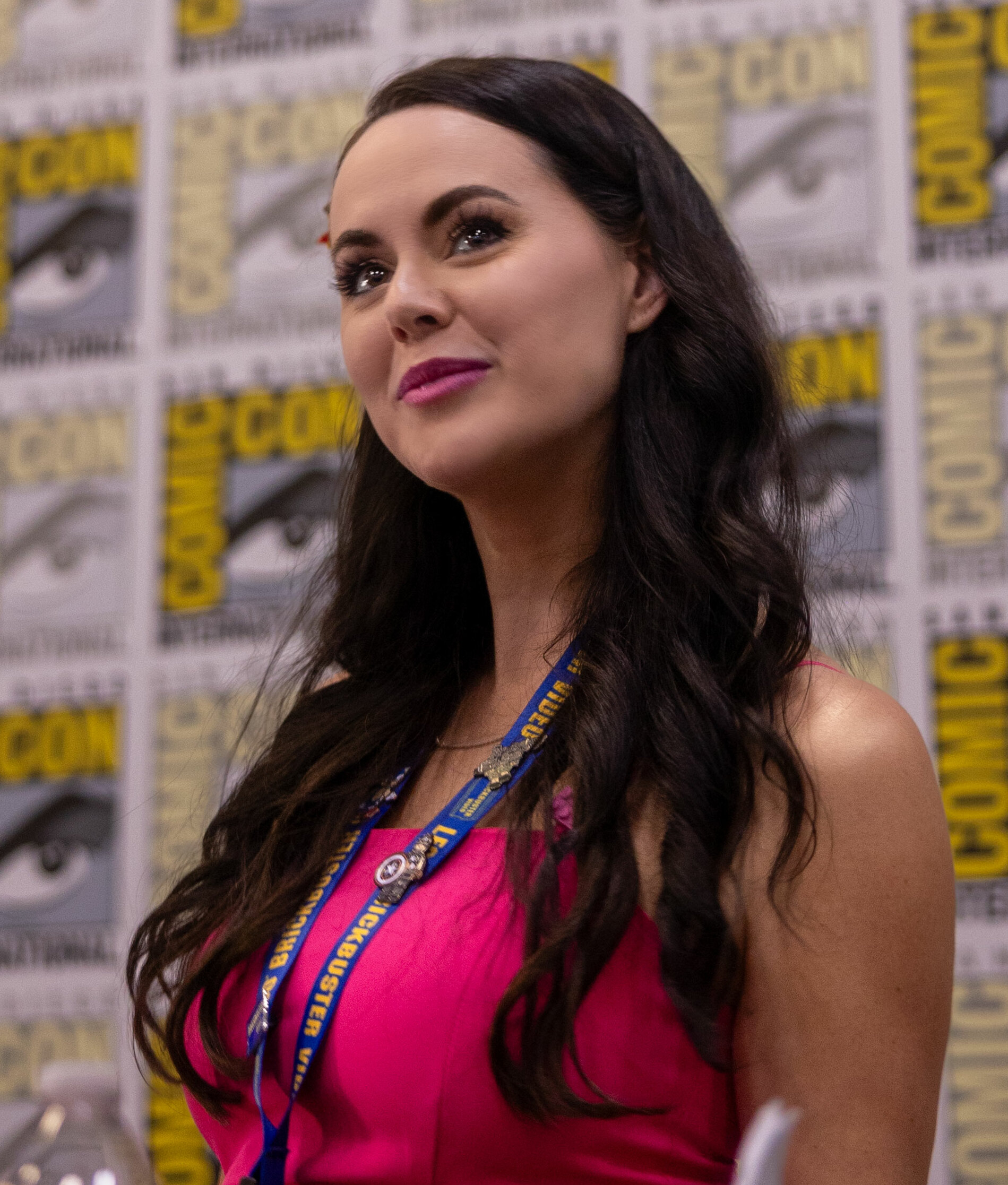
- Stacey Roy in 2023
- Born: Banff, Alberta, Canada
- Citizenship: Canadian
- Occupations: Producer, Host, Actress, Streamer
- Years active: 2009–present (Acting); 2011–2017 (Cosplaying); 2012–present (Hosting)
- Modeling information
- Height: 5’6
- Hair color: Dark Brown
- Eye color: Hazel

Stacey Roy is a LA-based Canadian actress and producer of the TV show The Nerdy Bartender, and the first Canadian to win Lego Masters with her victory with Nick Della Mora on the third season of the American version. She is also the live host of the Amazon streaming show Cooking with Stacey. Based out of Kelowna, British Columbia. She produces content with her business partner Mike Parkerson via their production company Whabam Media Inc. Roy is also a cosplayer.

== Early life ==
Roy was born in Banff, Alberta, Canada to Teresa and Kurtis Roy. She was crowned Miss Teen Red Deer and Miss Teen Calgary in 2005.

Roy has worked with charities since 2005 including the Leo Club, Students Against Drunk Driving, the Chive, and Operation Supply Drop.

She says she built LEGO structures with her father when she was a child, but only started to build more professionally in recent years.

== Career ==
Roy's screen debut was in 2010 with the role of Jane in 30 Days of Night: Dark Days. Roy learned the art of bartending at Uva Wine Bar in Vancouver, Canada. She came up with the idea of “The Nerdy Bartender” after having a particularly bad drink at a dive-bar she used to work at called The Foggy Dew. She almost immediately began developing her show on YouTube and continued to do so for over a year. As she moved away from YouTube and towards Twitch, she recrafted the show into a live talk-show style format where she would interview guests while teaching them how to make various cocktails.

In 2013, she designed her costume for her second fan film StarCraft: Hunt for Kerrigan, which was nominated for Best Action Short at the Geeksboro Film Fest in 2015.

Between 2014 and 2015, Roy worked with YouTubers IFHT both in acting and producing capacities. The videos include How to be a DJ, How to be a Filmmaker and Bad Ways to Get Rid of Your Girlfriend. She also worked with YouTubers Film Riot shooting behind the scenes for a series of DJI commercials.

Later in 2015, Roy played Harley Quinn in the Leo Award nominated fan film Nightwing: The Darkest Knight directed by Matthew Campbell. Her work with the character was praised.

At the end of 2018, Roy successfully sold The Nerdy Bartender to The Brewdog Network for a 7-episode season. Almost immediately after its release in 2019, the show was picked up for a second season on the network DrinkTV which released in June 2020. In June 2022, Roy was revealed to be a contestant on LEGO Masters Season 3 on FOX with partner Nick Della Mora. On Dec 14, 2022, Roy and Della Mora were announced as winners of Lego Masters Season 3. After opening the park on Mar 31, 2023, Roy judged the first ever Junior Master Builder Competition at LEGOLAND in Goshen, NY.

Roy was announced as the host and moderator for LEGO Master's "Behind the Brick" panel at San Diego Comic-Con in 2023. Collaborating with Iron Chef Cat Cora, Roy hosted a special event at the Montessori-inspired cooking classes of Little Kitchen Academy. Roy returned to LEGO Masters with a surprise special guest appearance in Season 4 Episode 6 "Is It Brick?"

In 2025, Roy and Della Mora competed on the seventh season of Lego Masters Australia, representing Canada against Australian and other international teams.

== Filmography ==
=== Film, television and live broadcasts ===
List of performances in film, television and live broadcasts
2017	Overwatch in REAL Life!	Tracer	High budget fan film by Devin Graham
2014–present	The Nerdy Bartender LIVE	Host	Switch from YouTube to Twitch in Season 3 (Mid 2016)
2017–present	"Cooking" with Stacey	Host	A cooking show on Amazon Live
2018-2020	The Nerdy Bartender	Host	Spin-off TV series that aired on DrinkTV.
2022	LEGO Masters	Self	Winner of season 3 of FOX's LEGO Masters
2023	LEGO Masters	Self	Surprise special guest appearance
2025	LEGO Masters Australia	Self	Representing Canada

LEGO Masters Season 3 Episodes
Ep	Challenge	Air Date	Status
301	"Ready to Launch" - Spaceship	Sept, 21, 2022	Runner Up
302	"Jurassic World" - Dinosaurs with Special Effects	Sept 28, 2022	Passed
303	"Brickin' Bull Ride Rodeo" - Mechanical Bull	Oct 5, 2022	Passed
304	"Out on a Limb" - Build in a Real Tree	Oct 19, 2022	Won
305	"Brickminster Dog Show" - Recreate a life-sized Dog	Oct 26, 2022	Passed
306	"Pirate Ships Ahoy!" - Build a Pirate ship	Nov 6, 2022	Passed
307	"Camp Click-a-Brick" - Power Function Summer Camp	Nov 9, 2022	Bottom 2
308	"Mini Golf Masters" - Mechanical Mini Golf Hole	Nov 16, 2022	Bottom 2
309	"Wrecking Balls to the Wall" - Tallest Tower	Nov 23, 2022	Bottom 2
310	"Marvel Masters" - Recreate a Scene from ShangChi	Nov 24, 2022	Bottom 2
311	"Start Your Engines" - Build and Race a Go-Kart	Dec 7, 2022	Won
312	"Water Works" - Use Water to create movement	Dec 14, 2022	Won
313	"Finale: Master Build" - 24 hours to build anything	Dec 14, 2022	Won
406	"Is It Brick?" - Replace objects with LEGO replicas	Nov 2, 2023	Special Guest
