= Lego Masters (American TV series) season 2 =

Lego Masters
- Season 2
- Promotional poster for season 2, featuring host Arnett
- Hosted by: Will Arnett
- Judges: Jamie Berard; Amy Corbett
- No. of teams: 12
- Winners: Mark Erikson; Steven Erikson
- No. of episodes: 12

Release
- Original network: Fox
- Original release: June 1 – September 14, 2021

Season chronology
- ← Previous; Season 1 Next → Season 3

The second season of the American reality competition television series Lego Masters premiered on Fox on June 1, 2021. The season concluded with 12 episodes on September 14, 2021 with brothers Mark & Steven Erikson being crowned the winners.

== Host and judges ==
On November 11, 2020, it was announced that Fox had renewed the series for a second season with Arnett, Berard and Corbett returning. Alongside the renewal in November 2020, it was announced that Will Arnett, Jamie Berard and Amy Corbett would return from the previous season.

== Elimination table ==
Place	Team	Relation	Episodes											
Place	Team	Relation	1	2	3	4	5	6	7	8	9	10	11	12
1	Mark & Steven	Brothers	2ND	SAFE	RISK	SAFE	WIN^{†}	2ND (Note: Mark and Steven were placed in the top two for winning the aesthetics part of the challenge.)	SAFE	WIN	SAFE	WIN (Note: Mark and Steven used the Golden Brick earlier in the episode, but later found out they had actually won the challenge anyway.)	RISK	WINNERS
2	Zack & Wayne	Brothers	WIN^{†}	SAFE	SAFE	2ND	2ND	SAFE	SAFE	2ND	2ND	RISK	SAFE (Note: Zack and Wayne were placed in the finals for building the farthest from the wall.)	RUNNERS-UP
3	Caleb & Jacob	Brothers	SAFE	SAFE	RISK	SAFE	SAFE	RISK	2ND	SAFE	WIN	RISK	WIN	THIRD
4	Natalie & Michelle	Friends	SAFE	SAFE	SAFE	WIN	RISK	SAFE	SAFE	RISK	RISK	RISK	ELIM	
5	Dave & Richard	Friends	SAFE	2ND	WIN	RISK	SAFE	WIN (Note: Dave and Richard were placed in the top two for winning the demolition derby part of the challenge.)	WIN	SAFE	ELIM			
6	Bryan & Lauren	Siblings	SAFE	WIN	SAFE	SAFE	SAFE	SAFE	RISK	ELIM				
7	Maria & Philip	Married Couple	RISK	SAFE	SAFE	SAFE	SAFE	SAFE	ELIM					
8	Susan & Jen	Friends	RISK	SAFE	2ND	SAFE	SAFE	ELIM						
9	Syreeta & Randall	Friends	SAFE	SAFE	SAFE	SAFE	ELIM							
10	Paras & Moto	Friends	SAFE	SAFE	2ND	ELIM								
11	Zach & Tim	Father-son	SAFE	RISK	ELIM									
12	Jack & Dawn	Siblings	SAFE	ELIM										

^{†}Team awarded the Golden Brick.

The team won the challenge.
The team was second this week.
The team was safe from elimination.
The team was safe due to using the Golden Brick.
The team was at risk of elimination.
The team was eliminated from the competition.

== Episodes ==
No. overall	No. in season	Title	Original release date	Prod. code	U.S. viewers (millions)
11	1	"LEGO Day Parade"	June 1, 2021	LEG-201	1.69
Teams must build a self-reflective float with at least one moving component for the first annual Lego Day parade. Midway through the challenge, teams found out that the team who won the first challenge would receive the Golden Brick, granting immunity at a later time. The bottom two teams were Susan & Jen, who were critiqued for poor time management, and Maria & Philip, who were critiqued for not having enough dynamic movement. No team was eliminated, but Zack and Wayne won the Golden Brick, with Mark and Steven as runners-up for the challenge.
12	2	"Hero Shot!"	June 8, 2021	LEG-202	1.59
Teams must build a scene for a slow motion hero shot with an explosion. Each team uses a randomly selected minifigure hero with an assigned explosion material (water, slime, glitter, or colored dust). Bryan and Lauren won the challenge with their ladybug hero exploding a frog with a pollen bomb; Dave and Richard were the runners-up. The bottom two teams were Jack and Dawn as well as Zach and Tim. Both teams were critiqued for not having enough of their builds break for the explosions. Ultimately, Jack and Dawn were eliminated.
13	3	"Make And Shake"	June 15, 2021	LEG-203	1.66
The contestants must build buildings that can withstand an earthquake, and are judged based on how far they go up the "brickter scale"; the buildings must be at least four feet tall. The top three contestants were Paras and Moto, Susan and Jen, and Dave and Richard. Ultimately, Dave and Richard won the competition for being the highest on the brickter scale and for bright colors. In contrast, Zach and Tim, Mark and Steven, and Caleb and Jacob were at the bottom three. Ultimately, Zach and Tim were eliminated due to being the lowest on the Brickter scale and low creativity. Guest starring: Jennifer Love Hewitt.
14	4	"Hats Incredible!"	June 22, 2021	LEG-204	1.67
The teams must build wearable Lego hats based on a color chosen that will match with given clothes. The teams must choose one member to model their hat in a fashion show and last five seconds without holding up the hat to strike a pose. The top two were Zack and Wayne and Natalie and Michelle. Natalie and Michelle won for their asymmetrical design, black color, and rotating head piece. In contrast, the bottom two were Dave and Richard and Moto and Paras; Moto and Paras were eliminated for design flaws and for easily breaking while on the runway.
15	5	"One Floating Brick"	July 6, 2021	LEG-205	1.61
The contestants must build a floating LEGO build that is balancing on one single technic brick; The builds must include a story and multiple details. Halfway through the build, Will announces that the winner of the challenge will be given the Golden Brick that grants immunity. The top two were Zack and Wayne, and Mark and Steven. Ultimately, Mark and Steven won for letting loose and use of detail. In contrast, The bottom two were Natalie and Michelle, and Randall and Syreeta; Randall and Syreeta were eliminated for lack of detail and story. Guest starring: Ken Jeong.
16	6	"Demolition Derby"	July 20, 2021	LEG-206	1.55
In the first challenge, the builders must try to recreate a Lego model of a Lamborghini car from memory, shown to them and then destroyed. The team that came closest to the reconstruction gained an advantage in the second challenge. In that challenge, the builders had to create a vehicle that would win in a demolition derby against all of the other teams' entries. The advantage gained from the first challenge allowed that team to hold off entry the derby for 30 seconds. The judges selected the team to eliminate based on their performance in the derby and overall look of their build. The bottom two teams were Susan and Jen & Caleb and Jacob; Susan and Jen were eliminated. In contrast, Mark and Steven and Zach & Wayne were named the top two; Mark and Steven were the winners of the challenge.
17	7	"Bricking Wind"	August 10, 2021	LEG-207	1.53
The teams were required to build a world with a windmill that is able to withstand 60 mph wind. Caleb and Jacob and Mark and Steven were able to have their builds reach 60 mph, but the judges instead judged the teams on aesthetics. The top two teams were Caleb and Jacob and Dave and Richard. Ultimately, Dave and Richard won the challenge. The bottom two teams were Maria and Philip & Bryan and Lauren. Ultimately, Maria and Philip were eliminated for not only having the lowest mph, but for having a much more simpler build than the other teams.
18	8	"Puppet Masters"	August 17, 2021	LEG-208	1.38
The teams were required to create one puppet and then act out a puppet show with another team. Judges were looking for artistry and motion of the build. Mark and Steven won the competition with their dragon puppet, while Zack and Wayne came in second with their swordsman. Natalie and Michelle and Bryan and Lauren were the bottom two, both due to a malfunction during the show and a lack of multiple motion sources; Bryan and Lauren were eliminated.
19	9	"Land & Sea"	August 24, 2021	LEG-209	1.48
For the first challenge, Evil Will comes back and split the teams in half to create either a land build or a sea build. Dave, Caleb, Michelle, Wayne, and Steven built the land builds, while Richard, Jacob, Natalie, Zack, and Mark built the sea builds. The second challenge was for the teams to combine their land and sea builds into one animal. The top two teams were Zack and Wayne and Caleb and Jacob; ultimately, Caleb and Jacob win the challenge. The bottom two teams were Natalie and Michelle and Dave and Richard. Ultimately, Dave and Richard were eliminated due to the judges seeing that their builds weren't combined.
20	10	"Flip My Block"	August 31, 2021	LEG-210	1.48
The teams are required to take a lame house and turn it around into their own dream house. Even though Mark and Steven used the Golden Brick, they still had the best build. Zack and Wayne, Natalie and Michelle, and Caleb and Jacob are all asked by Will to step down to the front, making them the bottom three, and making none of them safe or identified as second place in this challenge. Ultimately, no one was eliminated as all four teams produced great builds.
21	11	"Cliffhanger!"	September 7, 2021	LEG-211	1.41
To get into the finale, the final four teams are required to build a castle on the edge of a cliff. The team that's able to have their castle stretch out the furthest will automatically be in the finale, while the other teams get judge on aesthetics. Zack and Wayne were able to make their castle reach out to six feet making them the first team to advance to the season finale. Caleb and Jacob won the challenge for having the best aesthetics in their build making them the second team to advance to the finale, leaving Mark and Steven and Natalie and Michelle as the bottom two. Mark and Steven's build had the upper edge making them the third and final team to advance to the season finale, eliminating Natalie and Michelle.
22	12	"Master Build - Day & Night"	September 14, 2021	LEG-212	1.43
Zack and Wayne, Mark and Steven, and Caleb and Jacob are the final three teams and in this finale challenge, they will all be required to make their master build when the lights are on, and when the lights go out. During the building, the teams also get a video from their families. The brickmasters decided that Caleb and Jacob had the third place build, leaving the teams of Zack and Wayne, and Mark and Steven as the two teams to hear who has won the season. The brickmasters name Mark and Steven as the winners this season, taking home $100,000 and the Lego Masters trophy. Guest starring: Ken Jeong.

== Ratings ==
Viewership and ratings per episode of Lego Masters (American TV series) season 2
No.	Title	Air date	Rating (18–49)	Viewers (millions)	DVR (18–49)	DVR viewers (millions)	Total (18–49)	Total viewers (millions)	Ref.
1	"LEGO Day Parade"	June 1, 2021	0.5	1.69	0.4	1.23	0.9	2.92	
2	"Hero Shot!"	June 8, 2021	0.5	1.59	0.4	1.12	0.9	2.71	
3	"Make And Shake"	June 15, 2021	0.5	1.66	0.3	1.05	0.8	2.71	
4	"Hats Incredible!"	June 22, 2021	0.5	1.67	0.3	0.89	0.8	2.56	
5	"One Floating Brick"	July 6, 2021	0.5	1.61	0.3	0.93	0.8	2.54	
6	"Demolition Derby"	July 20, 2021	0.5	1.55	0.3	0.89	0.8	2.44	
7	"Bricking Wind"	August 10, 2021	0.5	1.53	0.3	0.84	0.7	2.37	
8	"Puppet Masters"	August 17, 2021	0.5	1.38	0.3	0.94	0.8	2.32	
9	"Land & Sea"	August 24, 2021	0.5	1.48	—N/a	—N/a	—N/a	—N/a	
10	"Flip My Block"	August 31, 2021	0.4	1.48	—N/a	—N/a	—N/a	—N/a	
11	"Cliffhanger!"	September 7, 2021	0.4	1.41	—N/a	—N/a	—N/a	—N/a	
12	"Master Build - Day & Night"	September 14, 2021	0.4	1.43	—N/a	—N/a	—N/a	—N/a	
