= Roma Agrawal =

British structural engineer

Roma Agrawal MBE FICE HonFREng
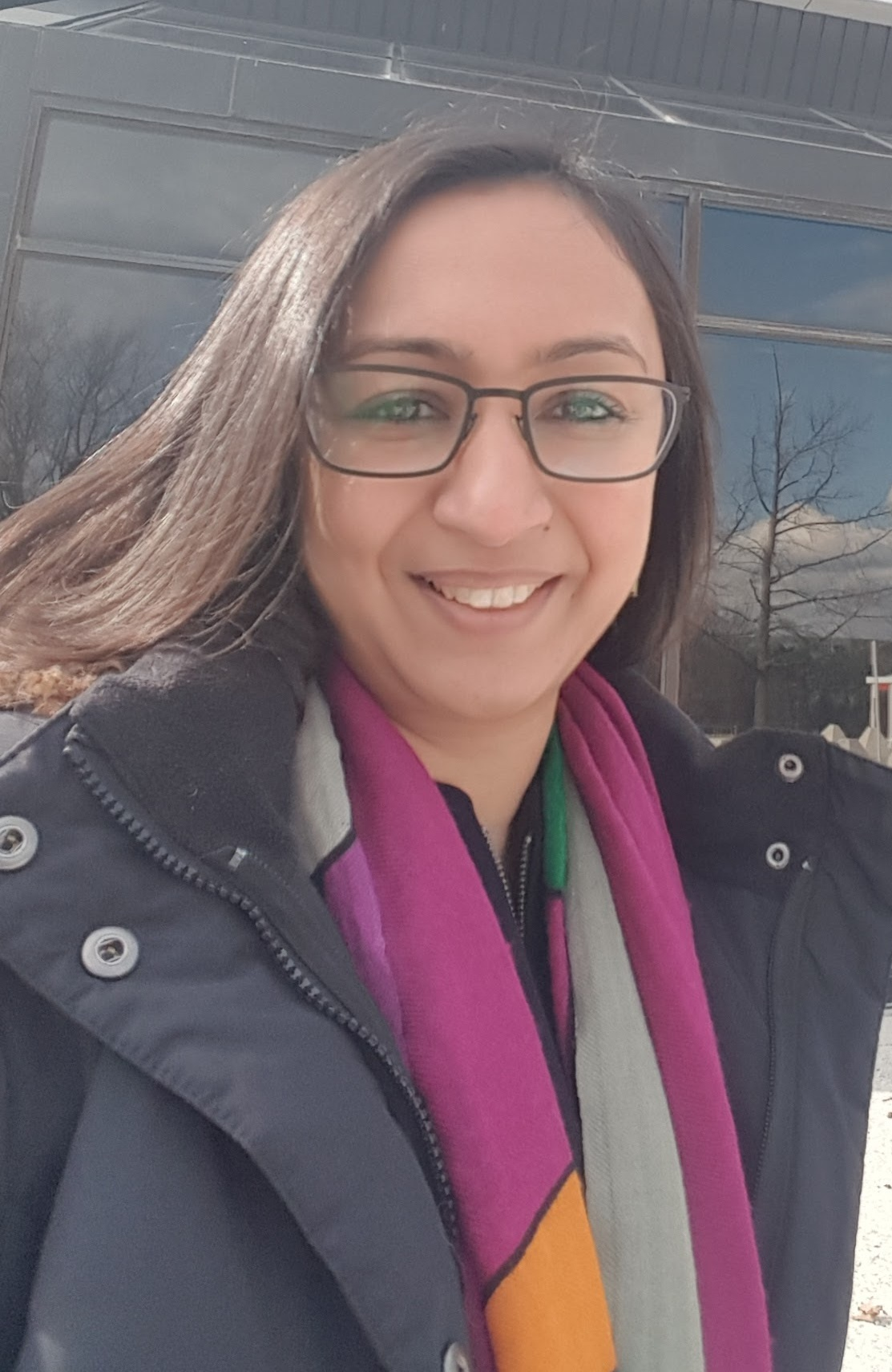
- Roma Agrawal at the NASA Goddard Space Flight Center
- Born: 1983 or 1984 (age 42–43); Mumbai, India
- Education: University of Oxford; Imperial College London
- Occupation: Structural Engineer
- Employer: AECOM
- Known for: The Shard London; Innovations in Construction; Women in Engineering

Roma Agrawal (born 1983/84) is an Indian-British chartered structural engineer based in London. She has worked on several major engineering projects, including the Shard. Agrawal is also an author and a diversity campaigner, championing women in engineering.

== Early life and education ==
Agrawal grew up in Mumbai, India, before moving to London. She also lived in Ithaca, New York for five years. She completed her A-Levels at North London Collegiate School. In 2004, she gained a BA in physics from the University of Oxford, and in 2005, an MSc in Structural Engineering from Imperial College London.

Agrawal attributes her enthusiasm for engineering to her love of making (and breaking) things, cultivated by playing with Lego as a child. Agrawal attributes her entry into engineering to a summer placement at the Oxford Physics Department where she worked alongside engineers who were designing particle detectors for CERN.

== Career ==
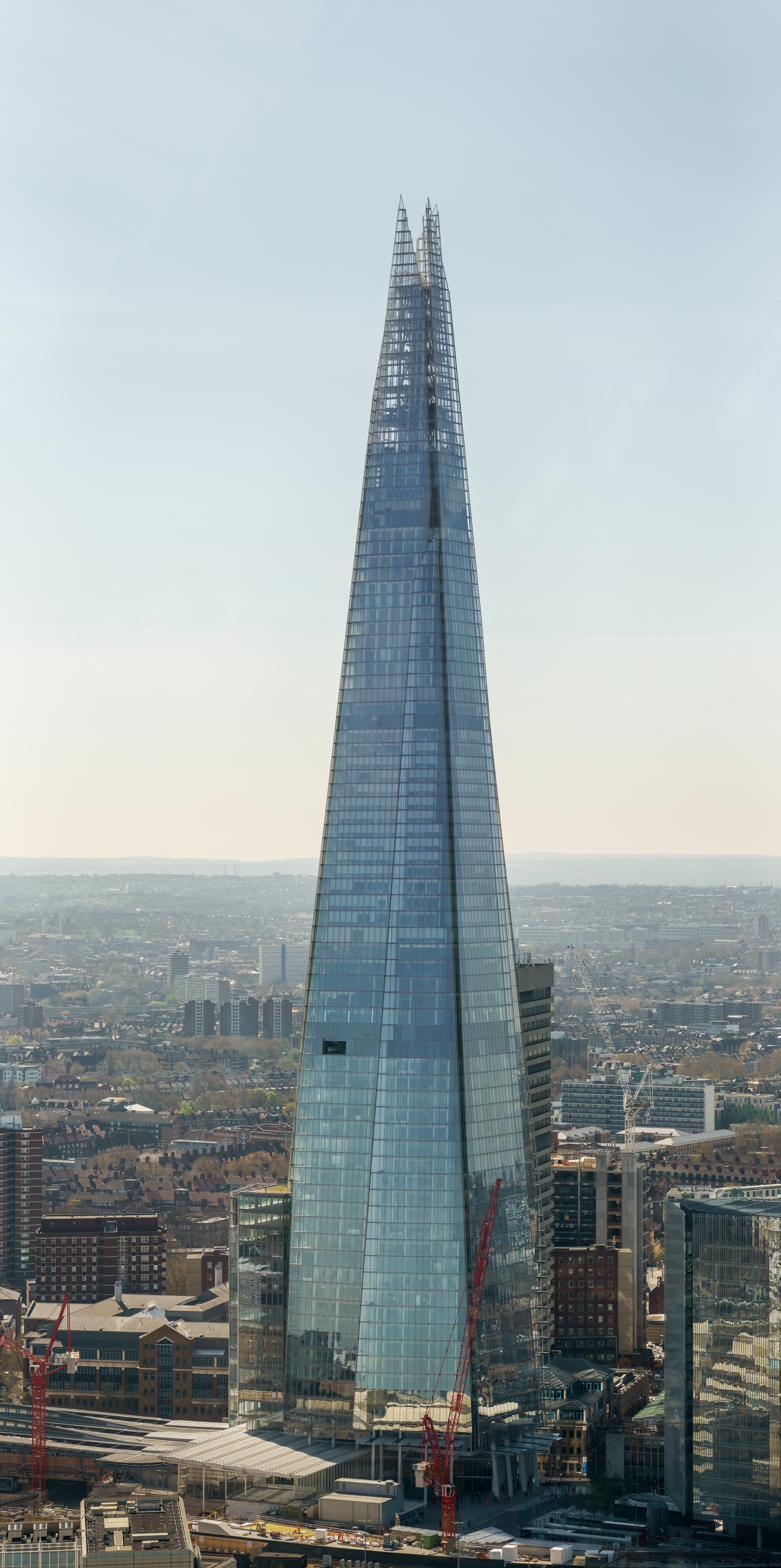
The Shard from the Sky Garden

In 2005, Agrawal joined Parsons Brinckerhoff (later called WSP) on a graduate program, becoming a chartered engineer with the Institution of Structural Engineers in 2011. She spent six years working on the tallest building in Western Europe, the Shard, designing the foundations and the iconic spire. She describes the project as a career highlight: "I think projects like that only come once or twice in your career, so I feel very fortunate to have had the opportunity to work on this". The 1,016-foot (310 m) tall structure required a top-down construction methodology, which had never been done before on a building of this scale. The spire required modular construction that could be built and tested off-site, enabling quick and safe assembly at height in central London.

Alongside the Shard, Agrawal worked on Crystal Palace Station and the Northumbria University Footbridge. She worked for WSP for ten years before joining Interserve as a Design Manager in November 2015. In May 2017, Agrawal joined AECOM as an associate director.

In the 2018 Birthday Honours, Agrawal was appointed Member of the Order of the British Empire (MBE) for services to engineering. She was appointed a Fellow of the Institution of Civil Engineers in 2018 and elected an Honorary Fellow of the Royal Academy of Engineering in 2021

=== Awards ===
- 2011: Institution of Structural Engineers Young Structural Engineer of the Year 2011
- 2013: BDO's British Indian Awards Best in Science & Engineering Winner
- 2014: Women in Construction Awards Engineer of the Year
- 2015: Association for Consultancy and Engineering Diamond Award for Engineering Excellence
- 2017: Institution of Structural Engineers Lewis Kent Award
- 2017: Royal Academy of Engineering Rooke Award for Public Promotion of Engineering
- 2025: The University of York for an Honorary Doctorate

=== Public engagement ===
Following her six years working on The Shard, Agrawal found herself presenting on her work to children at school and students at university and found a passion for raising awareness of engineering. She has since presented to over 15,000 people worldwide.

Agrawal's career has been covered extensively in both online and print media. She was a founding member of the Your Life Campaign, designed to change school children's perception of science and engineering backed by the Department of Business, Innovation and Skills.

In 2014, she was part of Marks and Spencer's Leading Ladies campaign, alongside Annie Lennox, Emma Thompson and Rita Ora. Later that year, she was chosen as one of six women engineers to follow on Twitter by The Guardian. She has given two TEDx talks, "City 2.0" (2013) and "Three Moments that will Change the World" (2015). She has featured on several BBC, Channel 4, and Science Channel television programs. Since 2017, she has appeared as a judge on the Channel 4 reality programme Lego Masters and as a structural engineer expert on Mysteries of the Abandoned. She judged the trophy design competition for the Queen Elizabeth Prize for Engineering in 2015 and 2017.

Agrawal's book, titled Built: the Hidden Stories Behind our Structures, an introduction to structural engineering, was published in 2018. The IET E&T magazine described it as a "a treatise on structural engineering". They went on to say

Roma Agrawal has a knack for taking complex concepts, stripping them down and reducing them to their most basic form ... What makes 'Built' so enjoyable is the way Agrawal applies her enquiring mind ... to an engineering world that she finds simultaneously invisible while being no less than fundamental to modern society.

=== Diversity ===
In 2013, Agrawal was voted one of Management Today's Top 35 Women Under 35. She raises awareness through social media, podcasts and interviews. After being a finalist herself in 2012, she was a keynote speaker at the IET's Young Women Engineer of the Year award ceremony in 2016, and in 2017 was listed as one of the "Inspiring Women in Engineering" by the Women's Engineering Society.

== Bibliography ==
Year	Title	Publisher	ISBN
2019	Built: The Hidden Stories Behind Our Structures	Bloomsbury Publishing	ISBN 978-1-4088-7037-2
2021	How Was That Built?	Bloomsbury Publishing	ISBN 978-1547609291
2023	Nuts and Bolts: Seven Small Inventions That Changed the World (In a Big Way)	Hodder	ISBN 978-1324021520
