= Lego Masters (American TV series) season 3 =

Lego Masters
- Season 3
- Promotional poster for season 3, featuring host Arnett
- Hosted by: Will Arnett
- Judges: Jamie Berard; Amy Corbett
- No. of teams: 13
- Winners: Nick Della Mora; Stacey Roy
- No. of episodes: 13

Release
- Original network: Fox
- Original release: September 21 – December 14, 2022

Season chronology
- ← Previous; Season 2 Next → Season 4

The third season of the American reality competition television series Lego Masters premiered on Fox on September 21, 2022. It ended on December 14, 2022, with influencers Nick & Stacey being crowned the winning team, defeating firefighters Stephen & Stephen and siblings Dave & Emily.

== Host and judges ==
Host Will Arnett and judges Jamie Berard and Amy Corbett returned from the previous seasons. Guests throughout the season included Chris Pratt accompanied by Blue during the second episode, and NASCAR racers William Byron and Jeff Gordon in the eleventh episode.

== Production ==
On December 3, 2021, it was announced that the series had been renewed for a third season. Alongside the renewal in December 2021, it was announced that Will Arnett would return to host. The season was originally slated to premiere on May 31, 2022, but was later pushed to the 2022–23 season. On June 6, 2022, it was announced that the third season would premiere on September 21, 2022.

== Elimination table ==
Place	Team	Relation	Episodes												
Place	Team	Relation	1	2	3	4	5	6	7	8	9	10	11	12	13
1	Nick & Stacey	Influencers	SAFE	SAFE	SAFE	WIN	SAFE	SAFE	RISK	RISK	RISK	RISK	WIN	WIN	WINNERS
2	Stephen & Stephen	Firefighters	WIN	SAFE	2ND	SAFE	2ND	SAFE	SAFE	SAFE	SAFE	WIN	RISK	SAFE	RUNNERS-UP
3	Dave & Emily	Siblings	SAFE	SAFE	RISK	SAFE	SAFE	2ND	SAFE	2ND	2ND	2ND	RISK	RISK	THIRD
4	Brendan & Greg	Brothers	SAFE	SAFE	SAFE	SAFE	WIN	WIN	RISK^{†}	SAFE	WIN	SAFE	WIN	ELIM	
5	Emily & Liam	Mother & Son	SAFE	WIN	WIN^{†}	SAFE	SAFE	SAFE	SAFE	SAFE	SAFE	ELIM			
6	Justin & Austin	Doctors	RISK	SAFE	SAFE	SAFE	2ND	RISK	2ND	WIN	ELIM				
7	Ethan & Dom	TikTokers				2ND	RISK	SAFE	WIN	ELIM					
8	Liz & Erin	Moms	SAFE	SAFE	SAFE	SAFE	SAFE	ELIM							
9	Jon & Xavier	Friends	SAFE	2ND	SAFE	RISK	ELIM								
10	Christine & Michelle	Friends	SAFE	SAFE	SAFE	ELIM									
11	Kerry & Patrick	Grandpappies	SAFE	RISK	ELIM										
12	Eddie & Asiza	Siblings	SAFE	ELIM											
13	Drew & Miranda	Siblings	ELIM												

^{†}Team awarded the Golden Brick.

The team won the challenge.
The team was second this week.
The team was safe from elimination.
The team was safe due to using the Golden Brick.
The team was at risk of elimination.
The team was eliminated from the competition.
The team did not build in the episode.

== Episodes ==
No. overall	No. in season	Title	Original release date	Prod. code	U.S. viewers (millions)
23	1	"Ready to Launch"	September 21, 2022	LEG-301	1.47
For the first challenge of the season, the builders had to make their own spaceship. During the build, astronaut Jessica Meir made an appearance, and Dr. Marshburn appeared on a video call. Stephen & Stephen won the challenge, and nobody was identified as second place in this challenge. Drew & Miranda and Justin & Austin ended up in the bottom two. Drew & Miranda were eliminated for not showing enough story on the outside of their build.
24	2	"Jurass-brick World"	September 28, 2022	LEG-302	1.53
In a celebration of Jurassic World Dominion, teams were challenged to create a dinosaur scene utilizing special effects. The top two teams were Emily & Liam and Jon & Xavier. Emily & Liam won the challenge. The bottom two teams were Kerry & Patrick and Eddie & Asiza; Eddie & Asiza were eliminated. Throughout the episode, Chris Pratt attempts to escape and later tame the velociraptor, Blue.
25	3	"Brickin' Bull Ride Rodeo"	October 5, 2022	LEG-303	1.51
The teams are challenged to make their own Lego character which will hold up on a Rodeo Bull from levels 1-10. During the build, Will announces that the team with the build that rides the longest will win the Golden Brick. The top two teams were Emily & Liam (who reached level ten) and Stephen & Stephen (who reached level eight). Emily & Liam win the challenge, thus also winning the Golden Brick. The bottom two teams were Dave & Emily (who reached level two) and Kerry & Patrick (who reached level four). Ultimately, Kerry & Patrick were eliminated for having several problems with the weight of their build and a lack of cohesiveness in their character. After they leave, Will welcomes in a new team - Ethan & Dom - that joins the competition.
26	4	"Out on a Limb"	October 19, 2022	LEG-304	1.50
The teams are required to make their own dream treehouse in a real tree, without having anything else to hold it up. The top two teams were Nick & Stacey and Ethan & Dom. Nick & Stacey won the challenge. The bottom two teams were Christine & Michelle and Jon & Xavier. Christine & Michelle were eliminated for taking too much time to develop an idea for their build, not leaving themselves enough time to complete it.
27	5	"Brickminster Dog Show"	October 26, 2022	LEG-305	1.78
The teams are faced with a challenge where they have to build a replica of a real life dog. The builds will be judged in the first Lego Masters dog show. The top three teams were Stephen & Stephen, Brendan & Greg, and Justin & Austin. Brendan & Greg won the challenge. Emily & Liam's build was incomplete and broke while on the runway (having to carry it), but since they used the Golden Brick, they were automatically saved. Ethan & Dom and Jon & Xavier ended up in the bottom two, judged for their builds easily breaking while on the runway. Ultimately, Jon & Xavier were eliminated.
28	6	"Pirate Ships Ahoy!"	November 6, 2022	LEG-306	1.12
The teams are faced with building their own pirate ship. The top two teams were Dave & Emily, and Brendan & Greg. Brendan & Greg won the challenge. The bottom two teams were Liz & Erin and Justin & Austin. Liz & Erin were eliminated for having to pivot their original idea.
29	7	"Camp Click-A-Brick"	November 9, 2022	LEG-307	1.09
The teams are challenged to make their own fantasy summer camp. During the build, Will introduces a twist where the Golden Brick comes back, but also offers the winning team 90,000 bricks. The challenge winners would get to give another team the Golden Brick or 90,000 bricks for the box they choose to another team. The top two teams were Justin & Austin, and Ethan & Dom. Ethan & Dom win the challenge, gifting the other box to Brendan & Greg. Ethan & Dom got the 90,000 bricks, while Brendan & Greg got the Golden Brick. Brendan & Greg and Nick & Stacey were put in the bottom two. Ultimately, no one was eliminated.
30	8	"Mini Golf Masters"	November 16, 2022	LEG-308	1.45
The teams are challenged to turn a putting green into a playable mini golf course for Will to test out. The teams are also required to use power functions in their builds to make their courses stand out. The top two teams were Dave & Emily and Justin & Austin. Justin & Austin win the challenge, also winning a Lego Masters team jacket. The bottom two teams were Nick & Stacey and Ethan & Dom. Ethan & Dom were eliminated due to the final hole in their course, where the power function stopped the golf ball's roll.
31	9	"Wrecking Balls to the Wall"	November 23, 2022	LEG-309	1.56
The remaining teams are required to build their very own castle. At the end of the challenge, Will is going to destroy those castles with a wrecking ball. The team with the tallest castle is automatically safe from elimination. Dave & Emily had the tallest castle and are safe from elimination. Dave & Emily were put in the top two as well as Brendan & Greg. Ultimately, Brendan & Greg won the challenge for bright colors and letting loose in story. The bottom two teams were Justin & Austin and Nick & Stacey. Justin & Austin were eliminated for having the smallest castle, in addition to using too many elements to display the magic in their build.
32	10	"Marvel Masters"	November 24, 2022	LEG-310	2.94
The remaining teams are required to make a scene from one out of five Marvel movies. The scenes are Thor: Ragnarok (Brendan & Greg), Doctor Strange in the Multiverse of Madness (Stephen & Stephen), Guardians of the Galaxy Vol. 2 (Dave & Emily), Shang-Chi and the Legend of the Ten Rings (Nick & Stacey), and Captain Marvel (Emily & Liam). Brendan & Greg were also told that it was their last opportunity to use the Golden Brick, meaning that no matter what happens, they are safe from elimination. The top two teams were Dave & Emily and Stephen & Stephen; Stephen & Stephen won the challenge. The bottom two teams were Emily & Liam and Nick & Stacey. Emily & Liam were eliminated for poor time management, which left them minimal time to get the whole sky in their scene build.
33	11	"Start Your Engines"	December 7, 2022	LEG-311	1.21
The remaining teams are required to build their own NASCAR race car in teams of two pairs. Dave & Emily and Stephen & Stephen are the Red Team, while Nick & Stacey and Brendan & Greg are the Blue Team. During the race, they will also be required to make a pit stop on the course to fix any damage to their car. Will announces that the team with the best aesthetics would get pole position in the race. The Red Team won the advantage, but the Blue Team won the race, leaving the Red Team were put in the bottom two. Ultimately, no one was eliminated. Throughout the episode, Jeff Gordon and William Byron join as special guests while the teams built their cars.
34	12	"Water Works"	December 14, 2022	LEG-312	1.41
The final four teams are required to build a working water fountain to get themselves into the Lego Masters Season 3 Grand Finale. The winning build was Nick & Stacey, making them the first team in the finale. Stephen & Stephen were announced as the second team to move on to the finale, making Dave & Emily, and Brendan & Greg the bottom two. Dave & Emily are announced as the third and final team to advance to the season finale, eliminating Brendan & Greg.
35	13	"Finale: Master Build"	December 14, 2022	LEG-313	1.28
Dave & Emily, Stephen & Stephen, and Nick & Stacey are the final three teams and they will have to make their master build. During the build, a twist is thrown at the builders where they have to incorporate the first Lego set they had into their build. At a later point, Will announces that the winning team will get their build published at the new Legoland New York, and then invites the teams' families in for a bit of motivation. Dave & Emily are declared as third place, leaving the final two as Nick & Stacey, and Stephen & Stephen. The brickmasters name Nick & Stacey as the winners, taking home $100,000 and the Lego Masters trophy.

== Ratings ==
Viewership and ratings per episode of Lego Masters (American TV series) season 3
No.	Title	Air date	Timeslot (ET)	Rating (18–49)	Viewers (millions)	DVR (18–49)	DVR viewers (millions)	Total (18–49)	Total viewers (millions)	Ref.
1	"Ready to Launch"	September 21, 2022	Wednesday 9:02 p.m.	0.4	1.47	0.2	0.90	0.6	2.37	
2	"Jurass-brick World"	September 28, 2022	Wednesday 9:02 p.m.	0.4	1.53	0.2	0.79	0.6	2.32	
3	"Brickin' Bull Ride Rodeo"	October 5, 2022	Wednesday 9:02 p.m.	0.3	1.51	0.2	0.62	0.5	2.13	
4	"Out on a Limb"	October 19, 2022	Wednesday 9:45 p.m.	0.3	1.50	0.1	0.43	0.4	1.94	
5	"Brickminster Dog Show"	October 26, 2022	Wednesday 9:02 p.m.	0.4	1.78	0.2	0.69	0.6	2.47	
6	"Pirate Ships Ahoy!"	November 6, 2022	Sunday 9:02 p.m.	0.3	1.12	0.2	0.75	0.5	1.86	
7	"Camp Click-A-Brick"	November 9, 2022	Wednesday 9:02 p.m.	0.3	1.09	0.2	0.60	0.5	1.69	
8	"Mini Golf Masters"	November 16, 2022	Wednesday 9:02 p.m.	0.3	1.45	0.2	0.70	0.5	2.15	
9	"Wrecking Balls to the Wall"	November 23, 2022	Wednesday 9:02 p.m.	0.3	1.56	0.1	0.36	0.4	1.91	(Note: Live+7 ratings were unavailable, so Live+3 ratings have been used instead.)
10	"Marvel Masters"	November 24, 2022	Thursday 9:12 p.m.	0.9	2.94	0.1	0.42	1.0	3.36	
11	"Start Your Engines"	December 7, 2022	Wednesday 9:02 p.m.	0.3	1.21	0.2	0.54	0.4	1.75	
12	"Water Works"	December 14, 2022	Wednesday 8:00 p.m.	0.3	1.41	TBD	TBD	TBD	TBD	
13	"Finale: Master Build"	December 14, 2022	Wednesday 9:00 p.m.	0.3	1.28	TBD	TBD	TBD	TBD	
