= Lego Masters (British TV series) =

British reality show

- Presented by: Melvin Odoom; Nish Kumar
- Judges: Matthew Ashton; Roma Agrawal; Fran Scott; Amy Corbett
- Country of origin: United Kingdom
- Original language: English
- No. of seasons: 2
- No. of episodes: 11

Production
- Executive producers: Robert May; Jil Wilfret; Steph Harris
- Production company: Tuesday's Child

Original release
- Network: Channel 4
- Release: 24 August 2017 – 11 December 2018

Lego Masters is a British reality show in which teams compete to build the best Lego project. During its original run, it was hosted by Melvin Odoom and judged by Lego designer Matthew Ashton and structural engineer Roma Agrawal (series one) and Fran Scott (series two). Lego Masters premiered on Channel 4 on 24 August 2017. After a hiatus of four years, the show came back for a Christmas special on 24 December 2022 hosted by Nish Kumar and judged by Ashton and Amy Corbett from the American version of Lego Masters. The programme is produced by Tuesday's Child. The 2022 Christmas special was filmed in Warsaw, on the set of Poland's Lego Masters, and co-produced by Endemol Shine Polska.

The series has received strong reviews and positive comparisons to The Great British Bake Off.

== Series details ==
=== Series 1 (2017) ===
The first series aired on Channel 4 on 24 August 2017 and ended on 14 September 2017. This four-part series of Lego Masters commenced with auditions for 48 teams from across the UK and Ireland. They were whittled down to just eight pairs who battled in the Build Room to stay in the competition. The series was won by Nate & Steve who won the brick trophy and got to display their work at the then new Lego Museum in Billund, Denmark. During the finals it was decided that runner-up father and son duo Nicolas and Kobe would also have their work exhibited at the museum.

LEGO Masters series 1 (2017) - Teams
| Team | Ages | Relationship | Status |
|---|---|---|---|
| Nate & Steve | 29 & 42 | colleagues | Winners |
| Nicholas & Kobe | 40 & 12 | father and son | Runners-up |
| James & Jamil | 21 & 21 | fellow students | Eliminated in episode 4 |
| Guy & Abraham | 9 & 9 | friends | Eliminated in episode 3 |
| Jessica & Faolán | 47 & 13 | mother and son | Eliminated in episode 3 |
| Daniel & Jack | 38 & 11 | uncle and nephew | Eliminated in episode 2 |
| Arthur & Jonathan | 12 & 11 | friends | Eliminated in episode 1 |
| Michaela & Jade | 17 & 24 | cousins | Eliminated in episode 1 |

LEGO Masters series 1 (2017) - Episodes
| Episode | Title | Date |
|---|---|---|
| 1 | “Brick Feast” | 24 Aug. 2017 |
The competition begins with the auditions: 48 pairs of builders are whittled down to just 8 via a series of challenges including making a brick banquet. Lego Senior Designer Justin Ramsden is the judge during the auditions. The first challenge of the 8 teams was constructing a chair that could take an adult’s weight as well as a complementary banquet. Structural engineer Roma Agrawal is the guest judge.
| 2 | “Movement” | 31 Aug. 2017 |
Television presenter Richard Osman and mechanical engineer Dr. Shini Somara were the celebrity guest judges. The remaining teams compete in two challenges on the theme of movement. The first task saw the builders challenged to construct a vehicle without the opportunity to plan with a surprise twist which meant that the teams had to mash up two different modes of transport. The main task, that the teams had been able to plan for, was to construct a fairground with functioning rides.
| 3 | “Nature” | 7 Sep. 2017 |
Joining the judges are comedian Bill Bailey and Lego-artist Sean Kenney The remaining five teams compete to build the best nature display. The first unplanned build challenge saw the pairs required to build as many creatures as possible, using just 15 pieces per organism. The second challenge allowed for pre-planning, and had the LEGO builders constructing natural models that would be used to adorn a tree. The challenge was to integrate the models with the natural setting, pack the animals full of character and create a scene that is full of life.
| 4 | “The Final” | 14 Sep. 2017 |
The first challenge saw the three remaining pairs hear stories from children, which they had to interpret as a LEGO model. The children would both tell the stories and then judge the models. The last build that the teams would work on could be anything at all, a masterpiece build that would showcase their talent. The judging panel consisted of Matthew Ashton, comedian Dara Ó Briain along with members of the public.

=== Series 2 (2018) ===
The second series aired on Channel 4 on 6 November 2018 and ended on 4 December 2018. A Christmas special was broadcast on 11 December 2018. The series was won by Paul & Lewis, with Izzy & Stuart coming second in the grand final.

LEGO Masters series 2 (2018) - Teams
| Team | Ages | Relationship | Status |
|---|---|---|---|
| Paul & Lewis | 48 & 17 | father and son | Winners |
| Stuart & Izzy | 45 & 13 | father and daughter | Runners-up |
| Jayden & Kato | 11 & 37 | nephew and uncle | Eliminated in episode 5 |
| Chris & Joseph | 28 & 20 | brothers | Eliminated in episode 5 |
| Harry & Ollie | 9 & 10 | school friends | Eliminated in episode 4 |
| Catherine & Patrick | 10 & 12 | sister and brother | Eliminated in episode 3 |
| Nathan & Tom | 34 & 18 | new building buddies | Eliminated in episode 2 |
| Adam & Odette | 38 & 36 | husband and wife | Eliminated in episode 1 |

LEGO Masters series 2 (2018) - Episodes
| Episode | Title | Date |
|---|---|---|
| 1 | “Bridges and skyscraper” | 6 Nov. 2018 |
Comedian Rob Beckett is the guest judge as the Lego building show returns. The audition stages are skipped and the episode goes straight into the Build Room. In the unplanned challenge, each pairs of builders had to construct a metre-long stable bridge, that could then withstand a weighted RC model monster truck. For the planned challenge, the ultimate collaborative build saw each duo construct a floor to a skyscraper, which were then stacked to create one large building.
| 2 | “„Drop test” and historic scene” | 13 Nov. 2018 |
Joining the judges is comedian Paddy McGuinness. For the first unplanned challenge host Melvin Odoom dropped each build of the 7 remaining teams one by one to see which model got smashed up the best. For the main challenge, each team had planned a build that would be a fairly accurate representation of a historical moment, that incorporated movement.
| 3 | “Animals and crazy golf course” | 20 Nov. 2018 |
Comedian Chris Ramsey is the celebrity guest judge. The six teams are split in the unplanned challenge, with each builder individually tasked with constructing an animal. Six builders had to put together a land animal, the other six had to construct a sea animal. Each team then had to combine the two builds to concoct a hybrid animal. The planned main challenge was to construct a life-size crazy golf course.
| 4 | “Johnny Vegas bust and arcade machine” | 27 Nov. 2018 |
Joining the judges is comedian Johnny Vegas. For the unplanned challenge, the teams were required to sculpt a bust based on Johnny Vegas. In the planned challenge the teams had to come up with a functional arcade machine with only LEGO elements to work with.
| 5 | “The Final” | 4 Dec. 2018 |
In the penultimate round children described robo-pets to the four remaining teams, which they had to build into moving robo-pets using LEGO Boost, (Note: LEGO Boost is a line of robotics kits for kids aged around 7-12. It came out in 2017. The focus is on building and coding to create models that kids can play with. It contains motors and sensors, which can be controlled through a tablet app with simple, icon-based coding commands.) which led to two pairs being eliminated. The two remaining duos competed in the final Master Build challenge and were tasked with building something of their own choice; yet still needing to adhere to the criteria of technical skills, story-telling elements and overall aesthetic.
| Christmas special | “Celebrity LEGO Masters” | 11 Dec. 2018 |
Six young builders from previous shows (series 1 and 2) team up with celebrities to do battle in a range of festive challenges in this Christmas Special of the build challenge. The duos were: Team Reindeer (Note: Each team wore Christmas jumpers with for each team a different Christmas themed design) – Guy (10) and actor Joe Swash; Team Penguin – Abraham (10) and comedian Joel Dommett; Team Santa – Jayden (11) and tattoo fixer Alice Perrin; Team Tree - Izzy (13) and TV-personality Spencer Matthews; Team Turkey - Jack (12) and comedian Rob Beckett; Team Holly - Harry (9) and actor Warwick Davis

== International adaptations ==
Since its conception, the series format has been sold internationally to multiple different countries including Denmark, Germany, New Zealand, Australia, United States, The Netherlands and Belgium, Sweden, France, Finland & Poland.
