= Lego Masters (American TV series) season 1 =

Lego Masters
- Season 1
- Hosted by: Will Arnett
- Judges: Jamie Berard; Amy Corbett
- No. of teams: 10
- Winners: Tyler Clites; Amy Clites
- No. of episodes: 10

Release
- Original network: Fox
- Original release: February 5 – April 15, 2020

Season chronology
- Next → Season 2

The first season of the American reality competition television series Lego Masters premiered on Fox on February 5, 2020, and concluded on April 15, 2020. The season was won by married couple Tyler & Amy, with friends Boone & Mark finishing second, and friends Samuel & Jessica placing third.

== Production ==
Plans for an American adaption of Lego Masters was first revealed on January 9, 2019. On July 18, 2019, it was announced that the series would be broadcast on Fox.

On October 30, 2019, it was announced that Will Arnett would serve as host for the series, and that it would premiere on February 5, 2020. Amy Corbett and Jamie Berard, both from the Lego Group, served as expert judges for the show, referred to as 'Brickmasters'. All episodes in the first season were shot at Chandler Valley Center in Los Angeles.

Various guests were featured in the season including Mayim Bialik in the second episode, Phil Lord and Christopher Miller in the fourth episode, Nicole Byer in the seventh episode, and Terry Crews in the eighth episode. Additionally, C-3PO, R2-D2 and BB-8 from the Star Wars franchise were featured in the ninth episode, which was themed to the franchise.

== Elimination table ==
| Place | Team | Relation | Episodes | | | | | | | | | |
| Place | Team | Relation | 1 | 2 | 3 | 4 | 5 | 6 | 7 | 8 | 9 | 10 |
|---|---|---|---|---|---|---|---|---|---|---|---|---|
| 1 | Tyler & Amy | Married | SAFE | WIN | SAFE | 2ND | SAFE | 2ND | WIN | WIN | RISK (Note: Tyler and Amy were told by the judges that they had the weakest build and would have been sent home if a team were to be eliminated that week.) | WINNERS |
| 2 | Boone & Mark | Friends | SAFE | SAFE | SAFE | WIN | WIN | WIN^{†} | SAFE | 2ND (Note: Boone and Mark used the Golden Brick, but had one of the top two builds that challenge.) | WIN | RUNNERS-UP |
| 3 | Samuel & Jessica | Friends | RISK | RISK | 2ND | SAFE | SAFE | SAFE | 2ND | RISK | RISK | THIRD |
| 4 | Christian & Aaron | Friends | WIN^{†} | SAFE | SAFE | SAFE | 2ND | SAFE | RISK | ELIM | | |
| 5 | Flynn & Richard | Married | SAFE | SAFE | WIN | SAFE | SAFE | RISK | ELIM | | | |
| 6 | Mel & Jermaine | Friends | SAFE | SAFE | SAFE | SAFE | RISK | ELIM (Note: Jermaine and Mel were automatically placed in the bottom two after failing to make their bridge level with their road.) | | | | |
| 7 | Krystle & Amie | Friends | SAFE | SAFE | RISK | RISK | ELIM | | | | | |
| 8 | Manny & Nestor | Son & Father | RISK | SAFE | SAFE | ELIM | | | | | | |
| 9 | Travis & Corey | Brothers | SAFE | SAFE | ELIM | | | | | | | |
| 10 | Jessie & Kara | Friends | SAFE | ELIM | | | | | | | | |

^{†}Team awarded the Golden Brick.

The team won the challenge.
The team was second this week.
The team was safe from elimination.
The team was safe due to using the Golden Brick.
The team was at risk of elimination.
The team was eliminated from the competition.

== Episodes ==
| No. overall | No. in season | Title | Original release date | Prod. code | U.S. viewers (millions) |
|---|---|---|---|---|---|
| 1 | 1 | "Dream Park Theme Park" | February 5, 2020 | LEG-101 | 4.73 |
From empty plots of a larger Lego amusement park with an existing monorail system, teams are tasked to build a themed park that must include at least one automated moving attraction. Mark and Boone's moving part somehow stopped working, and Nestor and Manny's stopped halfway. No team was eliminated, but Aaron and Christian won the Golden Brick, giving them immunity.
| 2 | 2 | "Space Smash" | February 12, 2020 | LEG-102 | 3.50 |
Teams must build a Lego sculpture based on extraterrestrial aliens, strong enough to support itself and be carried around, but then must be able to be easily broken apart and in a spectacular fashion when smashed by various means (dropped from a height, smashed with a bat, or exploded by a compressed air blast within it). Jessie and Kara were eliminated due to their build falling apart before the explosion. Guest starring Mayim Bialik. Starting that week, the last place build is going home.
| 3 | 3 | "Cut in Half" | February 19, 2020 | LEG-103 | 2.98 |
Teams select one of several household objects that have been sawed in half, and must build a Lego structure extending from it that creatively builds out the missing half while integrating a story with the object. Travis and Corey were eliminated due to their build looking "incomplete".
| 4 | 4 | "Movie Genres" | February 26, 2020 | LEG-104 | 3.03 |
Each team is given a movie genre and must construct a scene that demonstrates that genres. After the initial build, the teams are assigned a second genre, and must add on to their existing build to combine the two genres. Aaron and Christian gave up their Golden Brick after being told by the judges that their build lacked character. Nester and Manny were eliminated due to their build having the impression of "two different skill levels". Guest starring Phil Lord and Christopher Miller.
| 5 | 5 | "Mega City Block" | March 4, 2020 | LEG-105 | 2.90 |
The remaining teams must choose a vacant block from a half-completed city and build their own city blocks over it. After the initial build, the teams then create monsters to attack their city blocks.
| 6 | 6 | "Need for Speed / Super-Bridges" | March 11, 2020 | LEG-106 | 3.43 |
Teams build cars in a mini-race challenge at the beginning of the episode. Teams that first or go the farthest are given more time to design and build in the main challenge. In the main challenge, teams are given two existing supports 6 feet (1.8 m) apart and must build a bridge out of Lego to be able to support the most weight as well as to be aesthetically-pleasing.
| 7 | 7 | "Storybook" | March 18, 2020 | LEG-107 | 3.61 |
Teams construct a scene from a story filled in by children invited to the show. Following the initial build, a second page is added, and the children individually choose things to add to the story. Guest starring Nicole Byer.
| 8 | 8 | "Good Vs. Evil" | March 25, 2020 | LEG-108 | 3.48 |
Teams choose two minifigures that are later determined to be heroes or villains. They then build their heroes'/villains' lairs and are put with another team to create a battle between their characters. Guest starring Terry Crews.
| 9 | 9 | "Star Wars" | April 8, 2020 | LEG-109 | 3.61 |
In the first challenge, teams were tasked to build a Lego structure that represented a droid that fit into the Star Wars universe with some form of motorized action. In the second challenge, teams had to reconstruct an iconic scene from the Star Wars films. The three chosen scenes were: the attack on ice planet Hoth from The Empire Strikes Back, the fight on the forest moon of Endor in Return of the Jedi, and defending the base on Crait in The Last Jedi. Teams selected their scenes based on their rankings from the first challenge. Featured appearances of C-3PO, R2-D2, and BB-8.
| 10 | 10 | "Finals" | April 15, 2020 | LEG-110 | 3.80 |
Teams are free to develop any Lego art sculpture they want within a 24-hour build period.

== Ratings ==
Viewership and ratings per episode of Lego Masters (American TV series) season 1
| No. | Title | Air date | Rating/share (18–49) | Viewers (millions) | DVR (18–49) | DVR viewers (millions) | Total (18–49) | Total viewers (millions) | Ref. |
|---|---|---|---|---|---|---|---|---|---|
| 1 | "Dream Park Theme Park" | February 5, 2020 | 1.6/7 | 4.73 | 1.0 | 2.90 | 2.6 | 7.64 | |
| 2 | "Space Smash" | February 12, 2020 | 1.2/6 | 3.50 | 0.8 | 2.24 | 1.9 | 5.74 | |
| 3 | "Cut in Half" | February 19, 2020 | 1.0/5 | 2.98 | 0.8 | 2.13 | 1.7 | 5.11 | |
| 4 | "Movie Genres" | February 26, 2020 | 1.0/5 | 3.03 | 0.7 | 1.89 | 1.7 | 4.92 | |
| 5 | "Mega City Block" | March 4, 2020 | 0.9/5 | 2.90 | 0.7 | 1.81 | 1.6 | 4.71 | |
| 6 | "Need For Speed / Super-Bridges" | March 11, 2020 | 1.0/5 | 3.43 | 0.6 | 1.72 | 1.6 | 5.15 | |
| 7 | "Storybook" | March 18, 2020 | 1.2/6 | 3.61 | 0.7 | 1.89 | 1.9 | 5.50 | |
| 8 | "Good Vs. Evil" | March 25, 2020 | 1.1/5 | 3.48 | 0.7 | 2.10 | 1.9 | 5.58 | |
| 9 | "Star Wars" | April 8, 2020 | 1.2/6 | 3.61 | 0.8 | 2.28 | 2.0 | 5.89 | |
| 10 | "Finals" | April 15, 2020 | 1.2/6 | 3.80 | 0.7 | 1.95 | 1.9 | 5.75 | |
