= Lego Masters (American TV series) =

American reality competition television series

- Genre: Reality competition
- Directed by: Rich Kim
- Presented by: Will Arnett
- Judges: Jamie Berard; Amy Corbett
- Country of origin: United States
- Original language: English
- No. of seasons: 5
- No. of episodes: 57

Production
- Executive producers: Anthony Dominici; Karen Smith; Steph Harris; Sharon Levy; DJ Nurre; Michael Heyerman; Brad Pitt; Dede Gardner; Jeremy Kleiner; Christina Oh; Jill Wilfert; Robert May; Will Arnett
- Producer: Antonia M. Green
- Camera setup: Multi-camera
- Production companies: Endemol Shine North America; Tuesday's Child; Plan B Entertainment; The Lego Group; Electric Avenue

Original release
- Network: Fox
- Release: February 5, 2020 – present

Lego Masters is an American reality competition television series that premiered on Fox on February 5, 2020. The series is based on the British series of the same name. Each episode features teams of two building Lego projects from a vast array of bricks and parts to meet both creative and practical goals set by the challenge for a particular episode. The show is hosted and executive produced by Will Arnett, who previously voiced the Lego minifigure version of superhero Batman in the Lego Movie franchise, with Lego Group creative designers Amy Corbett and Jamie Berard serving as the show's judges. Various guest stars have also served as hosts and judges.

As of May 2025, the series has been renewed for a fifth and sixth season, with the fifth season premiering that same month.

== Format ==
The series follows teams consisting of two Lego-building competitors, tasked with building creations out of Lego pieces based on a given theme within a given time period. After the allotted time to build, the teams demonstrate their creations to the host and two expert judges (referred to as 'Brickmasters') from the Lego Group: Amy Corbett, a senior design manager at Lego, and Jamie Berard, who oversees the Lego Creator Expert and Lego Architecture lines at Lego. The experts name the winning build and as well as the bottom two teams, explaining why teams were selected in this fashion. They then announce the losing team, who is eliminated from the competition. In addition to this judging, Amy and Jamie provide suggestions to the teams mid-way through the build.

Early in the season, the team with the best design as judged by the experts will be awarded the Golden Brick. They can then use it on any other challenge, after the build period but before the judging, to automatically advance to the next challenge if they do not feel confident about their work. Once they turn in the Golden Brick for immunity, it is then made available as the reward for a future challenge. The season will culminate in a finale, in which top teams compete for $100,000, a Lego Masters trophy, and the title of 'Lego Masters'.

== Production ==
Plans for an American adaption of Lego Masters was first revealed on January 9, 2019, to jointly be produced by Endemol Shine North America, UK-based independent production company Tuesday's Child, and Plan B Entertainment. On July 18, 2019, it was announced that the series would be broadcast on Fox.

On October 30, 2019, it was announced that Will Arnett would serve as host for the series, and that it would premiere on February 5, 2020. All episodes in the first season were shot at Chandler Valley Center in Los Angeles. According to Corbett, there were more than three million Lego bricks available for teams to use during the challenges. Lego artist Nathan Sawaya served as a consulting producer for the show, helping to design some of the example pieces, the challenges, and the show's Lego-based trophy. On November 11, 2020, it was announced that the series had been renewed for a second season. Production on the season began on March 15, 2021, at Atlanta Film Studios in Georgia. On April 7, 2021, it was announced that the season would premiere on June 1, 2021.

On December 3, 2021, it was announced that the series had been renewed for a third season, originally slated to premiere on May 31, 2022. On May 16, 2022, it was announced that the series would be getting a celebrity spinoff titled Lego Masters: Celebrity Holiday Bricktacular, while the third season was pushed to the 2022–23 season. On June 6, 2022, it was announced that the third season would premiere on September 21, 2022. The spinoff, Lego Masters: Celebrity Holiday Bricktacular, premiered on December 19, 2022.

On December 14, 2022, it was announced that the series had been renewed for a fourth season, which premiered on September 28, 2023. On September 13, 2023, ahead of the season four premiere, it was announced that the series had been renewed for a fifth season, which premiered on May 19, 2025. On May 12, 2025, Fox renewed the series for a sixth season. On June 13, 2025, it was announced that Nick Cannon will replace Arnett as host in season six, due to scheduling conflicts. The sixth season will also include audition episodes, filmed in June 2025 at Legoland California Resort.

== Episodes ==
=== Series overview ===
Season	Episodes	Originally released		Teams	Winners	Runner-ups	Ref(s)
Season	Episodes	First released	Last released	Teams	Winners	Runner-ups	Ref(s)
1	10	February 5, 2020	April 15, 2020	10	Tyler and Amy Clites	Boone Langston and Mark Cruickshank	
2	12	June 1, 2021	September 14, 2021	12	Mark and Steven Erickson	Zack and Wayne Macasaet	
3	13	September 21, 2022	December 14, 2022	13	Nick Della Mora and Stacey Roy	Stephen Cassley and Stephen Joo	
4	11	September 28, 2023	December 14, 2023	12	Christopher Lee and Robert Zhang	Neena Ahluwalia and Sam Malmberg	TBA
5	10	May 19, 2025	July 28, 2025	11	Ian and Sage Summers	Ben and Michael	TBA

=== Season 1 (2020) ===
No. overall	No. in season	Title	Original release date	Prod. code	U.S. viewers (millions)
1	1	"Dream Park Theme Park"	February 5, 2020	LEG-101	4.73
2	2	"Space Smash"	February 12, 2020	LEG-102	3.50
3	3	"Cut in Half"	February 19, 2020	LEG-103	2.98
4	4	"Movie Genres"	February 26, 2020	LEG-104	3.03
5	5	"Mega City Block"	March 4, 2020	LEG-105	2.90
6	6	"Need for Speed / Super-Bridges"	March 11, 2020	LEG-106	3.43
7	7	"Storybook"	March 18, 2020	LEG-107	3.61
8	8	"Good Vs. Evil"	March 25, 2020	LEG-108	3.48
9	9	"Star Wars"	April 8, 2020	LEG-109	3.61
10	10	"Finals"	April 15, 2020	LEG-110	3.80

=== Season 2 (2021) ===
No. overall	No. in season	Title	Original release date	Prod. code	U.S. viewers (millions)
11	1	"LEGO Day Parade"	June 1, 2021	LEG-201	1.69
12	2	"Hero Shot!"	June 8, 2021	LEG-202	1.59
13	3	"Make And Shake"	June 15, 2021	LEG-203	1.66
14	4	"Hats Incredible!"	June 22, 2021	LEG-204	1.67
15	5	"One Floating Brick"	July 6, 2021	LEG-205	1.61
16	6	"Demolition Derby"	July 20, 2021	LEG-206	1.55
17	7	"Bricking Wind"	August 10, 2021	LEG-207	1.53
18	8	"Puppet Masters"	August 17, 2021	LEG-208	1.38
19	9	"Land & Sea"	August 24, 2021	LEG-209	1.48
20	10	"Flip My Block"	August 31, 2021	LEG-210	1.48
21	11	"Cliffhanger!"	September 7, 2021	LEG-211	1.41
22	12	"Master Build - Day & Night"	September 14, 2021	LEG-212	1.43

=== Season 3 (2022) ===
No. overall	No. in season	Title	Original release date	Prod. code	U.S. viewers (millions)
23	1	"Ready to Launch"	September 21, 2022	LEG-301	1.47
24	2	"Jurass-brick World"	September 28, 2022	LEG-302	1.53
25	3	"Brickin' Bull Ride Rodeo"	October 5, 2022	LEG-303	1.51
26	4	"Out on a Limb"	October 19, 2022	LEG-304	1.50
27	5	"Brickminster Dog Show"	October 26, 2022	LEG-305	1.78
28	6	"Pirate Ships Ahoy!"	November 6, 2022	LEG-306	1.12
29	7	"Camp Click-A-Brick"	November 9, 2022	LEG-307	1.09
30	8	"Mini Golf Masters"	November 16, 2022	LEG-308	1.45
31	9	"Wrecking Balls to the Wall"	November 23, 2022	LEG-309	1.56
32	10	"Marvel Masters"	November 24, 2022	LEG-310	2.94
33	11	"Start Your Engines"	December 7, 2022	LEG-311	1.21
34	12	"Water Works"	December 14, 2022	LEG-312	1.41
35	13	"Finale: Master Build"	December 14, 2022	LEG-313	1.28

=== Season 4 (2023) ===
No. overall	No. in season	Title	Original release date	Prod. code	U.S. viewers (millions)
36	1	"Brick Lake"	September 28, 2023	LEG-401	0.95
37	2	"Catropolis"	October 5, 2023	LEG-402	0.98
38	3	"Volcanic Brickruptions"	October 12, 2023	LEG-403	0.91
39	4	"Build It By Ear"	October 19, 2023	LEG-404	1.01
40	5	"Cirque du Soleil"	October 26, 2023	LEG-405	1.00
41	6	"Is It Brick?"	November 2, 2023	LEG-406	1.18
42	7	"Brick Chic"	November 9, 2023	LEG-407	1.12
43	8	"Lego 2K Drive"	November 16, 2023	LEG-408	1.04
44	9	"Roller Coaster Madness"	November 30, 2023	LEG-409	1.02
45	10	"Bricks & All"	December 7, 2023	LEG-410	0.81
46	11	"Four-Ever Finale"	December 14, 2023	LEG-411	0.93

=== Season 5 (2025) ===
No. overall	No. in season	Title	Original release date	Prod. code	U.S. viewers (millions)
47	1	"Rebuild the Galaxy"	May 19, 2025	LEG-501	0.92
48	2	"Wedding Cakes"	May 26, 2025	LEG-502	0.98
49	3	"Over the Falls"	June 2, 2025	LEG-503	0.99
50	4	"Wicked"	June 9, 2025	LEG-504	1.01
51	5	"Get in Gear"	June 16, 2025	LEG-505	1.00
52	6	"Batman"	June 23, 2025	LEG-506	0.95
53	7	"Masquerade"	July 7, 2025	LEG-507	0.95
54	8	"Is it Brick? 90's Edition"	July 14, 2025	LEG-508	0.93
55	9	"Great Ball Contraptions"	July 21, 2025	LEG-509	0.95
56	10	"Hall of Fame Finale"	July 28, 2025	LEG-510	1.08

=== Special ===
Title	Original release date	Prod. code	U.S. viewers (millions)
"Lego Masters Sneak Peek: Jurassic World"	June 5, 2022	SP-2221	0.71

== Related programs ==
=== Celebrity Holiday Bricktacular ===
On May 16, 2022, it was announced that the series would be getting a celebrity spinoff titled Lego Masters: Celebrity Holiday Bricktacular, which premiered on December 19, 2022.

=== Lego Masters Jr. ===
On July 7, 2025, a spinoff featuring kids as contestants, titled Lego Masters Jr., was announced. The series, which premiered on August 18, 2025, is hosted by Kelly Osbourne with Amy Corbett from the main series returning as a judge, and Boone Langston (Lego designer and season one finalist) taking over Jamie Berard's spot as a judge.

== Awards and nominations ==
Year	Award	Category	Nominee	Result	Ref.
2020	Critics' Choice Real TV Awards	Best Competition Series	Lego Masters	Nominated	
2020	Critics' Choice Real TV Awards	Best Show Host	Will Arnett	Nominated	
2020	Primetime Emmy Awards	Outstanding Directing for a Reality Program	Rich Kim (for "Mega City Block")	Nominated	
2020	Primetime Emmy Awards	Outstanding Picture Editing for a Structured Reality or Competition Program	Samantha Diamond, Dan Hancox, Karl Kimbrough, Ian Kaufman, Kevin Benson, Josh Young and Jon Bilicki (for "Mega City Block")	Nominated	
2021	Kids' Choice Awards	Favorite Reality Show	Lego Masters	Nominated	
2022	Kids' Choice Awards	Favorite Reality Show	Lego Masters	Nominated	
2024	Kids' Choice Awards	Favorite Reality Show	Lego Masters	Nominated	
