= Amy Corbett =

Scottish senior design manager

- Born: Glasgow, Scotland
- Education: Product design engineering
- Employer: The Lego Group
- Known for: Judge at American tv-series Lego Masters
- Title: Senior Engineer Manager

Amy Corbett is a Scottish senior design manager and product lead at the Lego Group. She is most known as a judge (called "brickmaster") in the American version of Lego Masters.

== Career ==
In 2008, Corbett spent three months assisting a non-government organization (NGO) in Botswana in the creation and implementation of sustainable projects. In 2011, she assisted with Engineers Without Borders (UK) to help the village coffee growers process their own crops. She started working as design manager at the Lego Group in 2012. Corbett is responsible for developing new product lines. She worked on the Lego Friends line, a line that was launched when she arrived at the Lego Group. She also worked for the Lego Disney line. She was part of the concept team for the 2018 film The Lego Movie 2: The Second Part. Her current project with her design team is Lego DOTS, where they work to customize daily items like jewelry and picture frames.

In 2020, she started her role as judge “Brickmaster Amy” on the American edition of Lego Masters; a television reality show in which teams compete to build the best Lego project. In 2022, she also became a judge on the Christmas special episode of the British edition.
