= Deaths in July 2015 =

The following is a list of notable deaths in July 2015.

Entries for each day are listed alphabetically by surname. A typical entry lists information in the following sequence:

- Name, age, country of citizenship and reason for notability, established cause of death, reference.

== July 2015 ==
=== 1 ===
- Nasser al-Hafi, Egyptian lawyer and politician, MP (since 2012), shot.
- Cecil, 13, Zimbabwean protected lion, shot.
- David P. Craig, 95, Australian chemist.
- Curly Moe, 53, Canadian professional wrestler, liver cancer.
- Val Doonican, 88, Irish singer and television presenter.
- N. Ganesan, 82, Singaporean football administrator.
- Edward Greenfield, 86, English music critic and broadcaster.
- Theo Hendriks, 86, Dutch politician, member of the House of Representatives (1994–1998).
- Lawrence Herkimer, 89, American cheerleading innovator, heart failure.
- Jens S. Jensen, 69, Swedish photographer.
- Aleksandr Kochetkov, 81, Russian football player and coach.
- Robert La Caze, 98, French-born Moroccan racing driver.
- Red Lane, 76, American country singer and songwriter ("'Til I Get It Right"), cancer.
- Mike Lesser, 71, British mathematical philosopher and political activist, asphyxiation.
- Miloslava Misáková, 93, Czech Olympic gymnast (1948).
- Shlomo Moussaieff, 90, Israeli diamond merchant and antique collector.
- Hans Muller, 78, Dutch Olympic water polo player (1960, 1964).
- Charles Notcutt, 81, British horticulturalist.
- Czesław Olech, 84, Polish mathematician.
- Overdose, 10, Hungarian Thoroughbred racehorse, horse colic.
- Whitey Overton, 86, American Olympic steeplechase runner.
- Víctor de la Peña Pérez, 81, Spanish-born Peruvian Roman Catholic prelate, Vicar Apostolic of Requena (1987–2005).
- Lewis Rome, 81, American attorney and politician.
- Sergio Sollima, 94, Italian director and screenwriter (Face to Face, Sandokan, The Big Gundown).
- Dan Williams, 73, American politician, member of the Alabama House of Representatives (since 2010), leukemia.
- Sir Nicholas Winton, 106, British humanitarian, organised rescue of 669 children as part of Kindertransport, respiratory failure.
- Russell Wood, 85, English cricketer (Gloucestershire).

=== 2 ===
- David Aronson, 91, Lithuanian-born American painter, pneumonia and heart failure.
- Slavko Avsenik, 85, Slovene composer and musician.
- Roy C. Bennett, 96, American songwriter.
- Jim Bradley, 94, Scottish-born Australian athletics coach.
- Frank Callaway, 69, Australian judge.
- Sir Ronald Davison, 94, New Zealand judge, Chief Justice (1978–1989).
- Julius Duscha, 90, American journalist (The Washington Post).
- Petro Korol, 74, Ukrainian Soviet weightlifter, Olympic champion (1976).
- Tom Longo, 73, American football player (New York Giants), mesothelioma.
- Archie McNair, 95, British lawyer and entrepreneur.
- Charlie Sanders, 68, American Hall of Fame football player (Detroit Lions), cancer.
- Bob Smalhout, 87, Dutch anesthesiologist and politician.
- Helen Steinbinder, 92, American law professor.
- Waldo Vieira, 73, Brazilian spiritualist.
- Jim Weaver, 70, American football player (Penn State) and coach (Iowa State), Virginia Tech Hokies Director of Athletics (1997–2014), Parkinson's disease.
- John Whitman, 71, American businessman and investment banker, First Gentleman of New Jersey (1994–2001), complications from a brain injury.
- Jacobo Zabludovsky, 87, Mexican news anchor (24 Horas), stroke.

=== 3 ===
- Steven Benson, 63, American convicted murderer, stabbed.
- Diana Douglas, 92, Bermudian-American actress (The Indian Fighter, Days of Our Lives, Planes, Trains and Automobiles), cancer.
- Goran Gogić, 29, Serbian footballer.
- Agop Jack Hacikyan, 83, Canadian author and academic.
- Ralph Lamb, 88, American lawman, Sheriff of Clark County, Nevada (1961–1978), depicted in Vegas, complications from surgery.
- Arturo Longton, 67, Chilean politician, Governor of Marga Marga Province (2010–2012).
- Humphrey Mwanza, 66, Zambian politician, member of the National Assembly for Solwezi West (since 2006), complications from surgery.
- Boyd K. Packer, 90, American apostle of the Church of Jesus Christ of Latter-day Saints, President of the Quorum of the Twelve (since 2008).
- Amanda Peterson, 43, American actress (Can't Buy Me Love, Explorers, Listen to Me), drug overdose.
- Roger Poole, 68, British trade union leader.
- Yogesh Kumar Sabharwal, 73, Indian judge, Chief Justice (2005–2007), heart attack.
- Odd Seim-Haugen, 78, Norwegian barrister and sports official.
- Jacques Sernas, 89, Lithuanian-born French actor (Helen of Troy, The Dirty Game, Midas Run).
- Charanjit Singh, 75, Indian musician, cardiac arrest.
- Gary Smith, 74, American business analyst, pneumonia.
- György Szabad, 90, Hungarian politician and historian, Speaker of the National Assembly (1990–1994).
- Wayne Townsend, 89, American politician, Indiana State Senator (1970–1986).
- Phil Walsh, 55, Australian football player (Collingwood, Richmond, Brisbane Bears) and coach (Adelaide), stabbed.
- John A. Williams, 89, American writer.
- Franz-Josef Wolfframm, 80, German footballer.
- Peter Záboji, 72, Hungarian angel investor and entrepreneur.

=== 4 ===
- Abdullah bin Abdulaziz Al Saud, 83–84, Saudi Arabian politician, Governor of Northern Borders Region.
- Muhammad Baqir al-Muhri, 67, Kuwaiti ayatollah.
- Dave Barber, 60, American talk radio and television host, stroke and heart attack.
- Nedelcho Beronov, 86, Bulgarian jurist and politician, Chairman of the Constitutional Court (2003–2006).
- Scot Breithaupt, 57, American BMX cyclist.
- Arnold Byfield, 91, Australian sportsman (Western Australia cricket team and Melbourne Football Club).
- Luis Doldán, 77, Paraguayan footballer
- Carlo de Gavardo, 45, Chilean rally car and motorcycle racer, respiratory failure.
- William Conrad Gibbons, 88, American historian, complications of a stroke.
- Reynaldo González López, 66, Cuban sports administrator.
- John Hinds, 35, Northern Irish motorcycle race doctor, injuries sustained in collision.
- Daniel Kastler, 89, French theoretical physicist.
- Norbert Peters, 72, German scientist.
- Daniel Quinn, 58, American actor (The Young and the Restless), heart attack.
- Lee Rainwater, 87, American sociologist.
- Valerio Ruggeri, 81, Italian actor and voice actor, heart attack.
- Anthony F. Upton, 85, British historian.
- Alan Walton, 79, British biochemist and venture capitalist.
- Charles Winick, 92, American anthropologist, sociologist and author.
- Yu Chenghui, 75, Chinese actor and martial artist.

=== 5 ===
- Andrew Alexander, 80, British journalist.
- James Bonard Fowler, 81, American policeman and convicted manslaughterer.
- Blaine Gibson, 97, American sculptor (The Haunted Mansion, Pirates of the Caribbean) and animator (Peter Pan).
- Sir Philip Goodhart, 89, British politician, MP for Beckenham (1957–1992).
- Uffe Haagerup, 65, Danish mathematician, drowned.
- Svein Hatløy, 75, Norwegian architect, founded Bergen School of Architecture.
- Terence Kelshaw, 78, English-born American Episcopal prelate, Bishop of Rio Grande (1989–2004).
- Hernus Kriel, 73, South African politician, Premier of the Western Cape (1994–1998), Minister of Law and Order (1991–1994).
- Piet Malan, 96, South African rugby union player.
- James S. Marcus, 85, American philanthropist and investment banker.
- Joseph McKenzie, 86, Scottish photographer.
- Aleksandra Mróz, 80, Polish Olympic swimmer.
- Yoichiro Nambu, 94, Japanese-born American physicist, Nobel Prize laureate.
- Burt Shavitz, 80, American beekeeper and businessman, co-founder of Burt's Bees.
- Abderrahmane Soukhane, 78, Algerian football player.
- Jack Steadman, 86, American football executive (Kansas City Chiefs).
- Gordon Thompson Jr., 85, American judge, cancer.
- Aaron E. Wasserman, 94, American food scientist.

=== 6 ===
- Ira Alterman, 70, American journalist and author.
- Julio Ángel, 69, Puerto Rican rock, pop and bolero singer, multiple myeloma.
- Max Annett, 84, Australian Olympic rower.
- Michael Birck, 77, American executive (Tellabs).
- Camille Bob, 77, American rhythm and blues singer, cancer.
- Stan Carew, 64, Canadian radio broadcaster, musician and actor (This Hour Has 22 Minutes, Trailer Park Boys).
- Antonio Casoar, 81, Italian Olympic rower.
- Sharon Christian, 65, Canadian artist, cancer.
- Raymond Dean, 68, American psychologist.
- Nazier Dindar, 49, South African cricketer.
- Victor Warren Fazio, 75, Australian surgeon.
- Ramanathan Gnanadesikan, 82, Indian statistician.
- Anne Iversen, 91, Danish Olympic athlete.
- Masabumi Kikuchi, 75, Japanese jazz pianist, subdural hematoma.
- Sir John Lambert, 94, British diplomat, Ambassador to Tunisia (1977–1981).
- Luigi Martella, 67, Italian Roman Catholic prelate, Bishop of Molfetta-Ruvo-Giovinazzo-Terlizzi (since 2000), heart attack.
- John Maxtone-Graham, 85, American maritime historian, respiratory failure.
- Rachel Margolis, 93, Lithuanian World War II partisan and Israeli biologist.
- Bhattam Srirama Murthy, 89, Indian politician.
- Don Petrie, 93, Canadian soccer player and coach.
- Franco Scaglia, 71, Italian writer and journalist, won Campiello Prize (2002).
- Fraser Scott, 95, British army officer.
- Jerry Weintraub, 77, American film producer (Ocean's Eleven, Diner, The Karate Kid), chairman and CEO of United Artists, heart attack.

=== 7 ===
- Maria Barroso, 90, Portuguese actress and politician, First Lady (1986–1996), complications from a fall.
- Leonard Bodack, 82, American politician.
- Keith Brown, 88, Canadian politician, member of the Legislative Assembly of Ontario (1959–1967).
- Bako Dagnon, 67, Malian singer.
- Jean Délémontez, 97, French aircraft designer (Jodel).
- Carlos Echeverria, 85, American Olympic sailor.
- Eva Fischer, 94, Italian artist.
- Hamid Golpira, 55, American-born Iranian journalist, lung cancer.
- John Greenwood, 70, American racing driver.
- Renée Hugon, 84, French gymnast.
- Glenn R. Jones, 85, American cable news executive.
- Pierre MacDonald, 79, Canadian politician, member of the National Assembly of Quebec (1985–1989).
- Bob MacKinnon, 87, American basketball coach (New Jersey Nets) and athletic director (Canisius Golden Griffins).
- Jaime Morey, 73, Spanish singer ("Amanece").
- Craig Norgate, 50, New Zealand businessman, CEO of Fonterra (2001–2003).
- Fons van Wissen, 82, Dutch footballer (PSV Eindhoven, national team).
- Donald Wood, 82, Canadian politician.

=== 8 ===
- Hisato Aikura, 83, Japanese music critic.
- Muhsin al-Fadhli, 34, Kuwaiti militant, airstrike.
- Robert Campos, 75, Filipino actor, colorectal cancer.
- Casimir Ehrnrooth, 84, Finnish executive, cardiac arrest.
- Richard Fire, 69, American actor (Warp!, Poltergeist III) and screenwriter (Henry: Portrait of a Serial Killer).
- Bill Foord, 91, English cricketer.
- Irwin Keyes, 63, American actor (House of 1000 Corpses, The Jeffersons, The Flintstones), complications from acromegaly.
- Arne Kotte, 80, Norwegian footballer.
- Paul J. Lioy, 68, American environmental scientist.
- Hugo Machado, 92, Uruguayan Olympic cyclist.
- Ernie Maresca, 76, American songwriter ("Runaround Sue", "The Wanderer") and singer.
- Ramiro Martinez, 91, Cuban sportscaster.
- Charles J. McCann, 89, American academic, president of The Evergreen State College.
- Harry Messel, 93, Canadian-born Australian physicist.
- Rolf Pettersson, 62, Swedish Olympic swimmer.
- Lloyd Reckord, 86, Jamaican actor and director.
- Philippe Rochat, 61, Swiss chef.
- Jerry Scanlan, 58, American football player (Washington Redskins).
- Frances Shea-Buckley, 86, American rear admiral, Director of the Navy Nurse Corps (1979–1983).
- Lucita Soriano, 74, Filipino actress.
- Ken Stabler, 69, American football player (Oakland Raiders), colon cancer.
- Harry Stowers, 89, American judge, member of the New Mexico Supreme Court (1982–1989).
- James Tate, 71, American Pulitzer Prize-winning poet.
- Yoash Tzidon, 88, Romanian-born Israeli politician.
- Walter Van Gerven, 80, Belgian law professor, Advocate General on the European Court of Justice (1988–1994).

=== 9 ===
- Saud bin Faisal bin Abdulaziz Al Saud, 75, Saudi royal, Minister of Foreign Affairs (1975–2015).
- Christian Audigier, 57, French fashion designer (Ed Hardy, Von Dutch), myelodysplastic syndrome.
- Jim Bede, 82, American aircraft designer, aneurysm.
- Caspar Bowden, 53, British privacy advocate, melanoma.
- Seán Foran, 84, Irish Gaelic football player (Offaly).
- Paul Gebhard, 98, American sexologist.
- Bill Hunter, 95, British political activist and author.
- C. Fred Jones, 85, American politician.
- Toshifumi Kosehira, 65, Japanese politician.
- Michael Masser, 74, American songwriter ("Saving All My Love for You", "Theme from Mahogany (Do You Know Where You're Going To)"), complications from a stroke.
- Bashar Nawaz, 79, Indian Urdu poet and songwriter.
- Sriballav Panigrahi, 74, Indian politician, member of the Lok Sabha (1984–1989, 1991–1998).
- David M. Raup, 82, American paleontologist, pneumonia.
- Bent Rolstad, 68, Norwegian anatomist.
- Tahsin Şahinkaya, 90, Turkish air force general, Commander (1978–1983).
- Alfonso Serrano, 94, Mexican Olympic sailor.
- R. J. Zwi Werblowsky, 91, Israeli religion scholar.

=== 10 ===
- David Bowman, 82, American Episcopal prelate, Bishop of Western New York (1987–1998).
- Woody Bowman, 73, American politician, member of the Illinois House of Representatives (1977–1990), traffic collision.
- Sam Bulbulia, 82, South African cricketer.
- Aldana Carraro, 20, Argentine gymnast.
- Rosemary Dinnage, 87, British author and reviewer, cancer.
- Hussein Fatal, 38, American rapper (Outlawz), traffic collision.
- Peter Jones, 85, British journalist and author, heart failure.
- Khristo Khristov, 80, Bulgarian Olympic pole vaulter.
- Arthur Koning, 70, Dutch Olympic coxswain (1968).
- Diarmuid Mac an Adhastair, 71, Irish actor (Ros na Rún).
- Jimmy Murray, 82, Scottish footballer.
- Leo Muthu, 63, Indian educationist and businessman.
- Muhammad Abdul Qayyum Khan, 91, Pakistani politician, Prime Minister of Azad Jammu and Kashmir (1956–1957, 1970–1985, 1991–1996).
- Roger Rees, 71, Welsh-American actor (Cheers, Robin Hood: Men in Tights, The West Wing), Tony winner (1982), stomach cancer.
- Omar Sharif, 83, Egyptian actor (Lawrence of Arabia, Doctor Zhivago, Funny Girl), heart attack.
- Jon Vickers, 88, Canadian heldentenor, Alzheimer's disease.
- Grahame Vivian, 95, British army officer.

=== 11 ===
- Claudia Alexander, 56, Canadian-born American geophysicist and planetary scientist (Jet Propulsion Laboratory), breast cancer.
- Abu Khalil al-Madani, Saudi Al-Qaeda leader.
- Stig Andersson, 90, Swedish Olympic cyclist.
- Joyce Bennett, 92, English Anglican priest.
- Giacomo Biffi, 87, Italian Roman Catholic cardinal, Archbishop of Bologna (1984–2003).
- Mark Birdwood, 3rd Baron Birdwood, 76, British peer and politician.
- Patricia Crone, 70, Danish-American historian and author (Hagarism), cancer.
- James U. Cross, 90, American military pilot (Air Force One), aide and author.
- Salvador Dubois, 79, Nicaraguan football player and coach.
- Max Fischer, 88, German politician.
- Alfred E. France, 88, American politician, member of the Minnesota House of Representatives (1963–1970), leukemia.
- Đuka Galović, 91, Croatian folk musician.
- Satoru Iwata, 55, Japanese game programmer (Super Smash Bros., Pokémon), president and CEO of Nintendo (since 2002), bile duct cancer.
- Lawrence K. Karlton, 80, American federal judge, US District Court for Eastern California (1979–2015), complications from heart valve failure.
- Richard F. Kelly, 78, American politician, member of the Illinois House of Representatives and Senate.
- Peter de Klerk, 80, South African racing driver.
- Roy Kurrasch, 92, American football player (Pittsburgh Steelers).
- Consuelo Castillo de Sánchez Latour, 91, Guatemalan author.
- André Leysen, 88, Belgian executive.
- Paavo Lyytikäinen, 85, Finnish footballer.
- Bunny Mack, 69, Sierra Leonean musician.
- P. Chendur Pandian, 65, Indian politician, Tamil Nadu MLA for Kadayanallur (since 2011).
- Ota Petřina, 66, Czech guitarist and songwriter.
- Thomas Piccirilli, 50, American writer, brain cancer.
- J. P. C. Roach, 95, British historian.
- Bojan Udovič, 57, Slovene Yugoslav Olympic cyclist (1980), traffic collision.

=== 12 ===
- D'Army Bailey, 73, American civil rights campaigner, judge and actor (The People vs. Larry Flynt), founder of the National Civil Rights Museum, cancer.
- Cheng Siwei, 80, Chinese economist, President of the China Democratic National Construction Association (1996–2007).
- Omar Félix Colomé, 82, Argentinian Roman Catholic prelate, Bishop of Cruz del Eje (1984–2008).
- JaJuan Dawson, 37, American football player (Cleveland Browns), drowned.
- Tenzin Delek Rinpoche, 65, Tibetan Buddhist monk and political prisoner, cardiac arrest from respiratory failure.
- Mahlon Duckett, 92, American baseball player (Philadelphia Stars).
- Helen F. Holt, 101, American politician, Secretary of State of West Virginia (1957–1959), member of the West Virginia House of Delegates (1955–1957), heart failure.
- Chenjerai Hove, 59, Zimbabwean exiled author, journalist and poet, liver failure.
- Javier Krahe, 71, Spanish singer-songwriter, heart attack.
- Bosse Larsson, 81, Swedish television presenter (Allsång på Skansen), brain cancer.
- Buddy Lively, 90, American baseball player (Cincinnati Reds).
- Milorad Milutinović, 80, Serbian football player and manager (Neuchâtel Xamax).
- Bafana Mlangeni, 48, South African actor.
- Hilbert Schauer, 95, American judge.

=== 13 ===
- Sir John Buchanan, 72, New Zealand natural resource executive, CFO of BP (1996–2002), Director of BHP Billiton (2003–2015), Chairman of ARM Holdings.
- J. R. Gach, 63, American radio personality, diabetes.
- Philipp Mißfelder, 35, German politician, member of the Bundestag (since 2005), pulmonary embolism.
- Arturo Paoli, 102, Italian Roman Catholic priest and missionary.
- Michael Rayner, 82, English opera singer.
- Ildikó Schwarczenberger, 63, Hungarian fencer, Olympic champion (1976).
- Joan Sebastian, 64, Mexican singer and songwriter, bone cancer.
- Campbell Smith, 90, New Zealand artist, poet and playwright.
- Martin Litchfield West, 77, British classical scholar.
- Eric Wrixon, 68, Northern Irish keyboardist (Them, Thin Lizzy).
- Gerhard Zwerenz, 90, German writer and politician, member of the Bundestag (1994–1998).

=== 14 ===
- Willer Bordon, 66, Italian businessman and politician, Minister of the Environment (2000–2001).
- Sir Sam Burston, 100, Australian farmer.
- Yohanna Dickson, 64, Nigerian military officer, Governor of Taraba (1993–1997).
- George Gardner Fagg, 81, American federal judge, United States Court of Appeals for the Eighth Circuit (1982–2006).
- Wolf Gremm, 73, German film director and screenwriter, complications from cancer.
- Gerd Gudding, 63, Norwegian musician.
- Ismet Hadžić, 61, Bosnian footballer, cancer.
- Masao Horiba, 90, Japanese businessman, founded Horiba.
- Nobuo Mii, 84, Japanese computer executive (IBM).
- Mansour Nariman, 80, Iranian oud player.
- Olaf Pooley, 101, English actor (Doctor Who, Star Trek: Voyager, Sunday Night Theatre) and writer.
- Robert Rapson, 80, American football coach.
- Marlene Sanders, 84, American television news executive (ABC World News Tonight, CBS News) and journalist, cancer.
- Alby Schultz, 76, Australian politician, NSW MP for Burrinjuck (1988–1998), federal MP for Hume (1998–2013), cancer.
- Dave Somerville, 81, Canadian-American singer (The Diamonds), pancreatic cancer.
- Kazumi Takahashi, 69, Japanese baseball player and coach (Yomiuri Giants, Nippon Ham Fighters).
- M. S. Viswanathan, 87, Indian music composer and film scorer.

=== 15 ===
- Jacques Allard, 89, French Olympic sailor.
- Masahiko Aoki, 77, Japanese economist, lung disorder.
- Phil Cayzer, 93, Australian rower.
- Federico Cerruti, 93, Italian art collector.
- Alan Curtis, 80, American harpsichordist, conductor and scholar.
- Alexis FitzGerald Jnr, 70, Irish politician, member of the Seanad Éireann (1982–1987) and Teachta Dála (1982), Lord Mayor of Dublin (1981–1982).
- Aubrey Morris, 89, British actor (A Clockwork Orange, Love and Death, The Wicker Man).
- William Noon, 66, American politician, cancer.
- Harry Pitch, 90, English harmonica player.
- Oswald Probst, 80, Austrian Olympic archer.
- Sheila Ramani, 83, Indian actress, complications from Alzheimer's disease.
- Howard Rumsey, 97, American modern jazz double bassist, bandleader and nightclub owner.
- Wan Li, 98, Chinese politician, Chairman of the National People's Congress (1988–1993).
- Jacques Thébault, 91, French actor.
- Fred Wendorf, 90, American archaeologist.
- Rogi Wieg, 52, Dutch writer and musician, euthanasia.

=== 16 ===
- Denis Avey, 96, British World War II veteran and memoirist.
- Joseph Caprani, 95, Irish cricket player and umpire.
- Paul Chervet, 73, Swiss Olympic boxer.
- Evelyn Ebsworth, 82, British chemist and university administrator, Vice-Chancellor and Warden of Durham University (1990–1998).
- Alcides Ghiggia, 88, Uruguayan-Italian football player and manager (Peñarol), heart attack.
- John H. Gibbons, 86, American scientist, Director of the Office of Science and Technology Policy (1993–1998).
- Sir Jack Goody, 95, British social anthropologist.
- Raymond Goussot, 93, French cyclist.
- Brian Hall, 68, Scottish footballer (Liverpool), leukaemia.
- Mustafa Kharoubi, 75-76, Libyan general and politician.
- Joseph D. Kimbrew, 86, American fire chief.
- Alan Kupperberg, 62, American comic book artist (The Amazing Spider-Man, Thor, Iron Man), thymus cancer.
- Jean Lacouture, 94, French journalist and historian.
- Jim Mayne, 64, Canadian politician, leader of Prince Edward Island New Democratic Party (1983–1989).
- V. Ramakrishna, 67, Indian playback singer and film scorer, cancer.
- Moreshwar Save, 85, Indian politician, MP for Aurangabad (1989–1996).
- Veikko Savela, 96, Finnish politician.
- Pranciškus Tupikas, 86, Lithuanian politician.
- W. Wilbert Welch, 97, American theologian.
- Milton L. Wood, 92, American Episcopal prelate, Bishop Suffragan of Atlanta (1967–1974).

=== 17 ===
- Andal Ampatuan Sr., 74, Filipino politician, Governor of Maguindanao, suspect in the Maguindanao massacre, heart attack.
- Bill Arnsparger, 88, American football coach (New York Giants, LSU Tigers) and athletic director (University of Florida), heart attack.
- Jules Bianchi, 25, French Formula One driver, head injuries sustained in a race collision.
- Owen Chadwick, 99, British historian, theologian, and rugby player.
- Murray Feingold, 84, American physician and medical journalist.
- Francis P. Filice, 92, American priest and academic.
- Don Fontana, 84, Canadian tennis player.
- Duff Holbrook, 92, American biologist and outdoorsman, designer of rocket net for use in hunting.
- Ray Jessel, 85, Welsh scriptwriter and songwriter (Baker Street).
- William C. Kuebler, 44, American military officer, appointed lawyer for Omar Khadr, cancer.
- John McCluskey, 71, Scottish Olympic boxer (1964).
- Van Miller, 87, American football announcer (Buffalo Bills).
- James Nyondo, 47, Malawian politician, lung cancer.
- Susumu Okubo, 85, Japanese theoretical physicist.
- Nova Pilbeam, 95, British actress (The Man Who Knew Too Much, Young and Innocent, Tudor Rose).
- Hartley Rogers Jr., 89, American mathematician.
- Dagmar Sierck, 57, German Olympic swimmer.
- John Taylor, 72, British jazz pianist, heart attack.
- Dick van Bekkum, 89, Dutch radiobiologist.

=== 18 ===
- William Henry Atkinson, 92, Canadian fighter pilot.
- Tim Beaglehole, 82, New Zealand historian and educator, chancellor of Victoria University, pneumonia.
- Sushil Bhattacharya, 90, Indian football player, men's (East Bengal) and women's (national team) coach.
- Ron Bissett, 83, Canadian Olympic basketball player.
- Elmer Borstad, 90, Canadian politician.
- Buddy Buie, 74, American songwriter ("Spooky", "Traces"), heart attack.
- George Coe, 86, American actor (Archer, Kramer vs. Kramer, The Mighty Ducks).
- Neal Falls, 45, American murder suspect, shot.
- Lou Gardiner, 62, New Zealand military officer, Chief of the Army (2003–2006), cancer.
- Priscilla Kincaid-Smith, 88, South African-Australian nephrologist, discovered the link between phenacetin and kidney cancer.
- Athanasios Moulakis, 70, Greek historian and political scientist.
- Finn Rasmussen, 94, Danish Olympic sprint canoeist.
- Alex Rocco, 79, American actor (The Godfather, The George Carlin Show, The Facts of Life), Emmy winner (1990), pancreatic cancer.
- Richard Shoup, 71, American computer scientist.
- Hugh Stretton, 91, Australian historian.
- Per Tønder, 104, Norwegian politician.
- Wang Fuzhou, 80, Chinese mountain climber.
- Allan Willett, 78, British soldier and businessman, Lord-Lieutenant of Kent (2002–2011).
- Brock Winkless, 55, American puppeteer and visual effects technician (Child's Play, Tales from the Crypt, Terminator 2: Judgment Day); multiple sclerosis.
- Yang Ko-han, 27, Taiwanese actress, suicide by hanging.

=== 19 ===
- Van Alexander, 100, American big band leader, songwriter-arranger ("A-Tisket, A-Tasket"), film and television composer (I Dream of Jeannie, Bewitched), heart failure.
- Rugger Ardizoia, 95, Italian baseball player (New York Yankees), stroke.
- Stellan Bojerud, 70, Swedish politician, MP for Dalarna (2012–2015).
- Al Checco, 93, American actor (The Party).
- Douglas S. Cook, 56, American screenwriter (The Rock, Double Jeopardy, Holy Matrimony).
- Elio Fiorucci, 80, Italian fashion designer.
- Josh Greenberg, 28, American technology executive, co-founder of Grooveshark.
- Lalubha Jadeja, 92, Indian cricketer.
- Teiko Kihira, 87, Japanese politician, heart failure.
- Bernat Martínez, 35, Spanish motorcycle racer, race collision.
- Richard Ochoa, 31, Venezuelan cyclist, motorcycle collision.
- Bryan O'Linn, 87, South African-born Namibian jurist and human rights advocate, member of the High Court (1989–1999) and Supreme Court (1999–2006).
- Sybren Polet, 91, Dutch writer.
- Galina Prozumenshchikova, 66, Russian Soviet-era swimmer, Olympic champion (1964).
- Carmino Ravosa, 85, American composer and lyricist.
- Dani Rivas, 27, Spanish motorcycle racer, race collision.
- David Roth, 56, American opera director and manager
- Gennadiy Seleznyov, 67, Russian politician, Speaker of the Duma (1996–2003).
- Mildred Joanne Smith, 94, American actress (No Way Out) and educator, survivor of National Airlines Flight 101 crash.
- Václav Snítil, 87, Czech violinist and teacher.

=== 20 ===
- Jean Alfred, 75, Canadian politician.
- George Bon Salle, 80, American basketball player.
- Wayne Carson, 72, American songwriter ("The Letter", "Always on My Mind", "Neon Rainbow").
- Fred Else, 82, English footballer (Preston North End).
- Ron Fitch, 105, Australian railway historian.
- Inge Glashörster, 88, German Olympic sprinter.
- Sally Gross, 81, American dancer and choreographer, ovarian cancer.
- Des Horne, 75, South African footballer (Blackpool).
- Kafumba Konneh, 71, Liberian Islamic cleric, peace activist and public servant, commissioner of the Truth and Reconciliation Commission.
- Adrienne Martine-Barnes, 73, American author.
- Dieter Moebius, 71, Swiss-German electronic musician (Cluster, Harmonia, Moebius & Plank), cancer.
- Tom Moore, 86, American cartoonist (Archie), throat cancer.
- Sieghardt Rupp, 84, Austrian actor.
- Gunnar Sjölin, 91, Swedish Olympic speed skater.
- Raymond Stora, 84, French theoretical physicist.
- Shunsuke Tsurumi, 93, Japanese philosopher and anti-war activist, pneumonia.
- Giorgos Velentzas, 87, Greek actor.
- Colin Youren, 76, Australian football player (Hawthorn), cancer.

=== 21 ===
- Mitch Aliotta, 71, American musician (Rotary Connection, Aliotta Haynes Jeremiah), chronic obstructive pulmonary disease.
- Gigi Angelillo, 75, Italian actor and voice actor.
- Theodore Bikel, 91, Austrian-born American actor (The Defiant Ones, My Fair Lady, Fiddler on the Roof), folk singer and composer.
- Robert Broberg, 75, Swedish singer and songwriter, Parkinson's disease.
- Luiz Paulo Conde, 80, Brazilian politician and architect, Mayor of Rio de Janeiro (1997–2001).
- Charlie Cullinane, 72, Irish hurler (Cork).
- William R. Dickinson, 83, American geoscientist, member of the National Academy of Sciences.
- E. L. Doctorow, 84, American author (Ragtime, Billy Bathgate, The March), complications from lung cancer.
- Buddy Emmons, 78, American steel guitarist.
- Paul Freeman, 79, American music conductor, founder of Chicago Sinfonietta.
- Günter Fronius, 107, Austrian entrepreneur.
- Gelsen Gas, 82, Mexican artist and filmmaker.
- Nicholas Gonzalez, 67, American physician known for alternative cancer treatments.
- Tom Harpley, 86, Canadian football player (Toronto Argonauts, Winnipeg Blue Bombers).
- Ho Sheng-lung, 62, Taiwanese politician, MLY (1998–1999), liver cancer.
- T. Kanakam, 88, Indian actress.
- Kang Nung-su, 85, North Korean politician.
- Alfredo Lardelli, 59, Swiss murderer and businessman, multiple organ failure.
- Czesław Marchaj, 97, Polish yachtsman and professor.
- Ernie McCullough, 89, Canadian Olympic sprinter.
- Anthony Megale, 61, American mobster.
- Mariam Mfaki, 69, Tanzanian politician, MP for Dodoma (since 2000), lung cancer.
- Dick Nanninga, 66, Dutch footballer (Roda JC Kerkrade, national team), complications from diabetes.
- Serhiy Omelyanovych, 37, Ukrainian footballer (Charleroi).
- Don Randall, 62, Australian politician, MP for Swan (1996–1998) and Canning (since 2001), suspected heart attack.
- Olav Riste, 82, Norwegian historian.
- James F. Rothenberg, 69, American financial executive, chairman of the Capital Group, heart attack.
- Mike Turner, 80, English cricketer (Leicestershire).

=== 22 ===
- Agnes Kane Callum, 90, American genealogist.
- Barbara Calvert, 89, British barrister.
- Herschal Crow, 80, American politician, member of the Oklahoma Senate (1969–1982) and Secretary of Transportation (2001–2003), complications following hip surgery.
- Denny Ebbers, 41, Dutch Olympic judoka (1996), brain tumor.
- Christopher M. Fairman, 54, American legal scholar (Fuck: Word Taboo and Protecting Our First Amendment Liberties), cardiac arrest.
- Eddie Hardin, 66, British rock musician (Spencer Davis Group) and singer-songwriter, heart attack.
- Marilyn Jones, 88, American baseball player (AAGBPL).
- Don Joyce, 71, American musician (Negativland) and radio personality (Over the Edge), heart failure.
- Frank Narvo, 82, Australian rugby league player (Newtown Jets).
- Daron Norwood, 49, American country music singer.
- Roble Olhaye, 71, Djiboutian diplomat, Ambassador to the United States (since 1988), Dean of the Diplomatic Corps of Washington, D.C.
- Natasha Parry, 84, British actress (Romeo and Juliet, Oh! What a Lovely War, Meetings with Remarkable Men), stroke.
- Simon-Pierre Saint-Hillien, 64, Haitian Roman Catholic prelate, Bishop of Hinche (since 2009).
- Josef Scheungraber, 97, German World War II army officer and convicted war criminal.
- Hoza'a Sherif, 54, Lebanese diplomat, Ambassador to Iraq (since 2006), cancer.
- Martin Storey, British Channel Islander politician, member of the States (since 2008), cancer.
- Gordon Stuart, 91, Canadian-born Welsh portrait artist.
- Horst Walter, 76, German footballer (Dynamo Dresden).

=== 23 ===
- William Wakefield Baum, 88, American Roman Catholic prelate, Archbishop of Washington (1973–1980), Cardinal (1976–2015).
- Mladen Dražetin, 64, Serbian academic and poet.
- Francis Guess, 69, American civil rights advocate and public servant, member of the U. S. Civil Rights Commission (1983–1989).
- Jules Hirsch, 88, American physician.
- Jon the Postman, 59, English punk rock singer, burst heart valve.
- Shigeko Kubota, 77, Japanese artist, cancer.
- Mexicano 777, 43, Puerto Rican rapper, tongue and throat cancer.
- Don Oberdorfer, 84, American journalist and author, Alzheimer's disease.
- Colin Platt, 80, British historian and archaeologist.
- Rasoul Raeisi, 90, Iranian Olympic weightlifter (1948).
- José Sazatornil, 89, Spanish actor.
- Aung Thaung, 74, Burmese politician and businessman, member of the Pyithu Hluttaw for Taungtha Township (since 2011).
- Cirilo Vila, 77, Chilean composer, heart attack.
- James L. White, 67, American screenwriter (Ray), complications from pancreatic cancer.

=== 24 ===
- Irv Bauer, 82, American playwright and screenwriter.
- Corsino Fortes, 82, Cape Verdean writer, poet and diplomat, Ambassador to Portugal (1975–1981).
- Peg Lynch, 98, American comedy writer and actress (Ethel and Albert).
- Herb Metoyer, 79, American singer-songwriter and novelist, pulmonary fibrosis.
- Florenz Regalado, 86, Filipino Supreme Court judge.
- Jürgen Rohwer, 91, German naval historian.
- Mario Sereni, 87, Italian operatic baritone.
- Ingrid Sischy, 63, South African magazine editor and critic, breast cancer.
- Dale Sturtz, 77, American politician, member of the Indiana House of Representatives (1992–2002).

=== 25 ===
- Jacques Andreani, 85, French diplomat.
- Kalpataru Das, 64, Indian politician, member of the Rajya Sabha (since 2014), Odisha MLA for Dharmasala (1995–2014), cancer.
- R. S. Gavai, 85, Indian politician, Governor of Bihar (2006–2008), Kerala (2008–2011), member of the Rajya Sabha (2000–2006), MP for Amravati (1998).
- Silan Kadirgamar, 81, Sri Lankan academic.
- Bob Kauffman, 69, American basketball player (Seattle SuperSonics, Buffalo Braves) and coach (Detroit Pistons).
- Leo Madigan, 75, New Zealand author, cancer.
- Larbi Messari, 79, Moroccan politician and diplomat, Minister of Communications (1998–2000), Ambassador to Brazil (1985–1991).
- Robin Phillips, 73, British-born Canadian actor and director (Long Day's Journey into Night, Jekyll & Hyde, The Marriage of Figaro), artistic director of Stratford Festival (1975–1980).
- Paul Rowe, 67, Australian rower.
- Scott Sims, 59, American veterinarian and television personality (Aloha Vet), bladder cancer.
- Joseph Skerrett, 72, American literary critic.
- Nilo Zandanel, 77, Italian Olympic ski jumper.

=== 26 ===
- Abu Zant, 60–61, Jordanian Muslim scholar and politician, member of the House of Representatives (1989–1997).
- Richard Bass, 85, American ski executive and mountaineer, co-founder of Snowbird Ski Resort, first person to climb the Seven Summits, pulmonary fibrosis.
- Bobbi Kristina Brown, 22, American media personality and singer, water immersion and drug intoxication.
- Djô de Pedra de Lume, 61, Cape Verdean footballer (national team).
- Peter Ehrlich, 82, German actor.
- Peggy Evans, 94, British actress (The Blue Lamp).
- Vic Firth, 85, American musician and percussion mallet manufacturer, pancreatic cancer.
- Benita Gil, 102, Spanish teacher and exiled, Order of Isabella the Catholic (2014).
- Wolfgang Gönnenwein, 82, German conductor and music director, director of Staatstheater Stuttgart (1985–1992).
- Bijoy Krishna Handique, 80, Indian politician, MP for Jorhat (1991–2014), Rajya Sabha (1980–1986), Assam MLA for Jorhat (1971–1980).
- Lee Harwood, 76, British poet.
- Han Heijenbrock, 85, Dutch Olympic rower.
- Junichi Komori, 74, Japanese billiards player, cancer.
- Mike Kostiuk, 95, Canadian-born American football player (Cleveland Rams, Detroit Lions), heart failure.
- Jeffrey S. Lyons, 75, Canadian lawyer, lobbyist and business executive, heart attack.
- Flora MacDonald, 89, Canadian politician, Secretary of State for External Affairs (1979–1980), MP for Kingston and the Islands (1972–1988).
- Paul Massey, 55, English mobster and businessman, shot.
- Jan Mortimer, 65, New Zealand checkers player.
- Robert Mosher, 94, American architect (San Diego–Coronado Bridge).
- Lerryn Mutton, 90, Australian politician, member of the New South Wales Legislative Assembly for Yaralla (1968–1978).
- Vasili Pichul, 54, Ukrainian-born Russian film director (Little Vera).
- Leo Reise Jr., 93, Canadian ice hockey player (Detroit Red Wings), lung cancer.
- Ann Rule, 83, American true crime author (The Stranger Beside Me, Lust Killer), heart failure.
- Pía Sebastiani, 90, Argentine pianist and composer.
- Richard Smith, 80, Australian diplomat.
- Sebastiano Vassalli, 73, Italian novelist.
- Joe Williams, 56, American film critic (St. Louis Post-Dispatch), traffic collision.

=== 27 ===
- Tom Boyd, 86, American politician, member of the Idaho House of Representatives (1977–1992).
- Edward Campbell, 71, English rugby league player.
- J. W. S. Cassels, 93, British mathematician, fall.
- Rickey Grundy, 56, American gospel musician.
- Khweldi Hameidi, 72, Libyan major general.
- A. P. J. Abdul Kalam, 83, Indian scientist and politician, President of India (2002–2007), heart attack.
- Paul Langford, 69, British historian, Rector of Lincoln College, Oxford (2000–2012).
- Chris Lazari, 69, Cypriot-born British property developer, heart attack.
- Ivan Moravec, 84, Czech concert pianist.
- Clyde M. Narramore, 98, American author and psychologist.
- Rafael Navarro, 69, Spanish painter.
- Samuel Pisar, 86, Polish-born American lawyer, writer and Holocaust survivor, pneumonia.
- Alina Rodríguez, 63, Cuban actress, cancer.
- Anthony Shaw, 85, British army general, Director General Army Medical Services (1988–1990).
- Tony Vogel, 73, British actor (Raiders of the Lost Ark, Mission: Impossible, Miracle).

=== 28 ===
- James H. Allen, 87, American clown and children's television personality, heart failure.
- Diego Barisone, 26, Argentine footballer (Unión de Santa Fe), traffic collision.
- Nancy Tribble Benda, 85, American actress, pancreatic cancer.
- Claude M. Bolton Jr., 69, American army general.
- David Faber, 86, Polish-born Holocaust survivor and author (Because of Romek).
- Rip Hawkins, 76, American football player (Minnesota Vikings), Lewy body dementia.
- John M. Hull, 80, British theologian.
- Barry Hunter, 87, Australian Anglican prelate, Bishop of Riverina (1971–1992).
- James Jude, 87, American thoracic surgeon, developer of CPR, neurological disorder.
- Carolyn Kaelin, 54, American cancer surgeon, cancer.
- Jan Kulczyk, 65, Polish businessman (Kulczyk Investments), wealthiest person in Poland, complications of heart surgery.
- David Leaning, 78, British Anglican priest.
- Edward Natapei, 61, Ni-Vanuatu politician, President (1999), Prime Minister (2001–2004, 2008–2009, 2009–2010, 2011), MP (1983–2008).
- Fred Otnes, 89, American artist.
- Josef Pecanka, 90, Austrian field hockey player, football player and coach.
- Franciscus Xaverius Rocharjanta Prajasuta, 83, Indonesian Roman Catholic prelate, Bishop of Banjarmasin (1983–2008), kidney failure.
- Clive Rice, 66, South African cricketer, brain tumour.
- Shawn Robinson, 41, American stunt performer (Guardians of the Galaxy, Transformers, Hook).
- Okunade Sijuwade, 85, Nigerian traditional ruler of Ife.
- Suniti Solomon, 76, Indian doctor and AIDS researcher.
- Jack Boynton Strong, 85, American politician, member of the Texas Senate (1963–1971), Alzheimer's disease.

=== 29 ===
- Giorgio Albani, 86, Italian cyclist.
- Iain Baxter, 66, Scottish curler.
- Harry B. Brock Jr., 90, American banker.
- Antony Holland, 95, British-born Canadian actor, playwright, and theatre director.
- Malik Ishaq, 55–56, Pakistani Lashkar-e-Jhangvi leader, shot.
- Vasundhara Komkali, 84, Indian classical musician.
- Sir Peter O'Sullevan, 97, Irish-born British horse racing commentator, cancer.
- Charles Pous, 66, French Olympic hockey player.
- Mike Pyle, 76, American football player (Chicago Bears), 1963 NFL Champion, brain hemorrhage.
- Jemera Rone, 71, American human rights activist, ovarian cancer.
- Liya Shakirova, 94, Soviet and Russian linguist.
- Peter Sim, 98, Australian politician, Senator for Western Australia (1964–1981).
- S. Eva Singletary, 62, American surgeon.
- Tamarillo, 23, British eventing horse, euthanised. (death announced on this date)
- Sir John Todd, 88, New Zealand businessman (Todd Corporation) and philanthropist.
- Alfredo Vernacotola, 37, Italian poet.
- Franklin H. Westervelt, 85, American computer scientist.

=== 30 ===
- Oleg Alekseev, 62, Russian Soviet wrestler.
- Lynn Anderson, 67, American country singer ("Rose Garden"), heart attack.
- Stuart Baggs, 27, English entrepreneur and The Apprentice candidate.
- John Bitove Sr., 87, Canadian businessman.
- Louise Crossley, 72–73, Australian environmentalist and scientist.
- Eileen Daily, 72, American politician.
- Clifford Earl, 81, British actor (Doctor Who, The Sea Wolves).
- Harry Gast, 94, American politician, member of the Michigan Senate (1979–2002).
- Charlotte Wesley Holloman, 93, American soprano.
- Kenneth Irby, 78, American poet.
- Endel Lippmaa, 84, Estonian scientist and politician.
- Czesław Lorenc, 90, Polish Olympic rower.
- Yakub Memon, 53, Indian terrorist and chartered accountant, convicted of financing the 1993 Bombay bombings, execution by hanging.
- Francis Paul Prucha, 94, American historian.
- Gertie Shields, 84-85, Irish anti-drunk driving campaigner (Mothers Against Drunk Driving).
- Louis Sokoloff, 93, American neuroscientist.
- Alena Vrzáňová, 84, Czech figure skater, World Champion (1949, 1950) and European Champion (1950).
- John Weinert, 83, American college basketball coach (Bowling Green Falcons).
- Ernst K. Zinner, 78, Austrian-born American astrophysicist.

=== 31 ===
- Charles P. Bowers, 86, American baseball scout (Boston Red Sox, Los Angeles Dodgers, Philadelphia Phillies), Parkinson's disease.
- Curtis Brown, 60, American football player (Buffalo Bills), heart attack.
- Alan Cheuse, 75, American writer and critic, traffic collision.
- Ruud Sesink Clee, 84, Dutch rower.
- Coralie de Burgh, 90, British painter.
- Rubén Espinosa, 31, Mexican photographer and journalist. murdered.
- Robert Hemenway, 73, American educator, Chancellor of the University of Kansas (1995–2009).
- Howard W. Jones, 104, American physician, IVF pioneer, respiratory failure.
- Takeshi Katō, 86, Japanese actor (Ran).
- Elizabeth Lack, 99, British ornithologist.
- Gerald S. O'Loughlin, 93, American actor (The Rookies, In Cold Blood, Ice Station Zebra).
- Sasi Perumal, 59, Indian Gandhian and anti-alcohol activist.
- Billy Pierce, 88, American baseball player (Chicago White Sox, Detroit Tigers, San Francisco Giants), gallbladder cancer.
- Roddy Piper, 61, Canadian professional wrestler (WWE, WCW) and actor (They Live), complications from hypertension.
- Red Dragon, 49, Jamaican reggae singer.
- Richard Schweiker, 89, American politician, Secretary of HHS (1981–1983), Senator from Pennsylvania (1969–1981), U.S. Representative from Penn 13th district (1961–1969), infection.
- Ron Steiner, 77, American football and baseball coach.
- Derek Turner, 82, English rugby league player (Wakefield Trinity).
- W. Eugene Wilson, 86, American politician.
- Zhang Jingfu, 101, Chinese politician, Finance Minister (1975–1979), State Councilor (1978–1988).
