= Dindar (name) =

Dindar is a name which is used as a surname and a given name. Notable people with the name include:

== Surname ==
- Andy Dindar (born 1942), South African born English cricketer
- Ibrahim Dindar, French politician
- Nassimah Dindar (born 1960), French politician
- Nazier Dindar (1966–2015), South African cricketer
- Resul Dindar (born 1982), Turkish singer

== Given name ==
- Dindar Najman, Iraqi politician
