= Robert Rapson =

Robert Rapson may refer to:

- Robert Rapson (American football)
- Robert Rapson (artist)
