= Rafael Navarro =

Rafael Navarro may refer to:

- Rafael Navarro (comics) (born 1967), American comics author
- Rafa Navarro (footballer, born 1994), Spanish footballer
- Rafa Navarro (footballer, born 1972), Spanish footballer
- Rafael Navarro (painter) (Rafael Navarro Núñez, 1946–2015), Spanish
- Rafael Navarro (photographer) (Rafael Navarro Garralaga, born 1940), Spanish
- Rafael Navarro-Gonzalez (1959–2021), Mexican chemist
- Rafael Navarro (footballer) (born 2000), Brazilian footballer
