= Altermann =

Altermann is a German surname. Notable people of the surname include the following:

- Hanns Altermann (1891–1963), German bookseller, editor, journalist and publisher
- Karl-Heinz Altermann (1922–2013), German officer
- Theodor Altermann (1885–1915), Estonian actor, theatre producer and director

== See also ==
- "Alter Mann", a song by Rammstein from Sehnsucht
- Alterman
