= Van Bekkum =

van Bekkum is a surname. Notable people with the surname include:

- Darren van Bekkum (born 2002), Dutch professional cyclist
- Dick van Bekkum (1925–2015), Dutch medical-radiobiologist
- Herman van Bekkum (1932–2020), Dutch chemist
- Ivar van Bekkum (born 1965), part of Dutch artistic duo PolakVanBekkum
- Willem van Bekkum (1910–1998), Dutch bishop of the Roman Catholic Diocese of Ruteng
- Wout van Bekkum (born 1954), Dutch Middle East studies scholar
