= Alterman =

Alterman is a surname of German and also Yiddish origin, meaning "old man". Notable people of the surname include the following:

- Boris Alterman (born 1970), Israeli chess player of Ukrainian origin
- Eric Alterman (born 1960), American columnist
- Eva Alterman Blay (born 1937), Brazilian sociologist and politician
- Idan Alterman (born 1971), Israeli actor
- Ira Alterman (1945–2015), American journalist and author
- Kent Alterman, American film director and producer
- Leonard Alterman (1922–2009), American basketball player
- Meyer Alterman (1891–1967), New York assemblyman
- Nathan Alterman (1910–1970), Israeli writer of Polish origin
- Ran Alterman (born 1980), Israeli triathlete
- Tirtza Alterman, birth name of Tirtza Atar, Israeli poet, songwriter, playwright, actress, and translator
- Vladimir Alterman (born 1942), Israeli chess player

== See also ==
- Altermann
