= Hisato =

- Gender: Male

Origin
- Origin: Japanese
- Meaning: Different meanings depending on the kanji used

Hisato (written: 久人, 久登, 寿人, 尚人, 壽人 or 尚登) is a masculine Japanese given name. Notable people with the name include:

- Hisato Aikura (相倉 久人; born 1931), Japanese music critic
- Hisato Ichimada (一萬田 尚登; 1893 1984), Japanese businessman and banker
- Hisato Igarashi (五十嵐 久人; born 1951), Japanese gymnast
- Hisato Matsumoto (松本 尚人; born 1984), Japanese swimmer
- Hisato Ohzawa (大澤 壽人; 1907–1953), Japanese composer
- Hisato Satō (佐藤 寿人; born 1982), Japanese footballer
- Hisato Takenaka (竹中 尚人; born 1955), Japanese musician known professionally as Char
- Hisato Yasui (安井 久登; born 1976), Japanese swimmer
