= Rolstad =

Rolstad is a surname. Notable people with the surname include:

- Bent Rolstad (1947–2015), Norwegian professor of medicine
- Jan Rolstad (born 1950), Norwegian race walker
