= Benita Gil =

Spanish teacher and syndicalist organizer

- Born: Benita Gil Lamiel; 14 January 1913; La Ginebrosa, Spain
- Died: 26 July 2015 (aged 102); Prague, Czech Republic
- Occupation: Teacher
- Spouse: Felipe Serrano

Benita Gil Lamiel (14 January 1913 – 26 July 2015) was a Spanish teacher and syndicalist organizer.

She was made a Commander of the Order of Isabella the Catholic in 2014, at age 101.

== Biography ==
The daughter of a farmer, Benita Gil Lamiel spent her childhood in La Ginebrosa, although the nucleus of her family came from and resided in Mas de las Matas, where she went to school from ages 11 to 14. In 1928 the family moved to Zaragoza. There she pursued a teaching career from 1928 to 1932, becoming the first woman in her family to earn a university degree. She was one of a large number of women teachers to be hired under the Second Republic's Professional Teaching Plan. A member of the Provincial Association of Primary Education Teachers in Zaragoza, during the Civil War Gil worked as a teacher in Alcañiz, and beginning in April 1938, in Llançà, a circumstance that facilitated her departure from Spain. In January 1939 she went into exile in France, where she married Felipe Serrano, a fellow teacher who had been her partner since 1938, and with whom she had two children.

In 1950, her husband was expelled from France along with many other Spaniards. They were taken in by Czechoslovakia and were assigned to Ústí nad Labem, a city in northern Bohemia. The following year, in December 1951, Gil and her children, together with relatives of other Spaniards, were gathered in Toulouse where a night train took them to Prague. Gil worked as a textile company operator for eight years, and in the early 1960s, as a member of the Communist Party of Spain, she went to work for the World Federation of Trade Unions, an organization in which she served as a French interpreter and secretary of the Latin American Section for 17 years. In 1980, Gil and her husband returned to democratic Spain. However, in 1992, they moved back to Prague to be close to their children and grandchildren.

Gil was made a Commander of the Order of Isabella the Catholic in 2014. Receiving the honor in Prague, she recalled the circumstances of her long exile.

I was a teacher, and I always considered that if I stayed I would have been thrown out of teaching.

On 27 March 2014, she was granted the Title of Ambassador of Mas de las Matas and the Medal of the Faithful Villa of Mas de las Matas.

Benita Gil died in Prague on 26 July 2015 at age 102.
