= Caffè Giubbe Rosse =

Building in Florence, Italy

Coordinates: 43°46′16.14″N 11°15′14.31″E

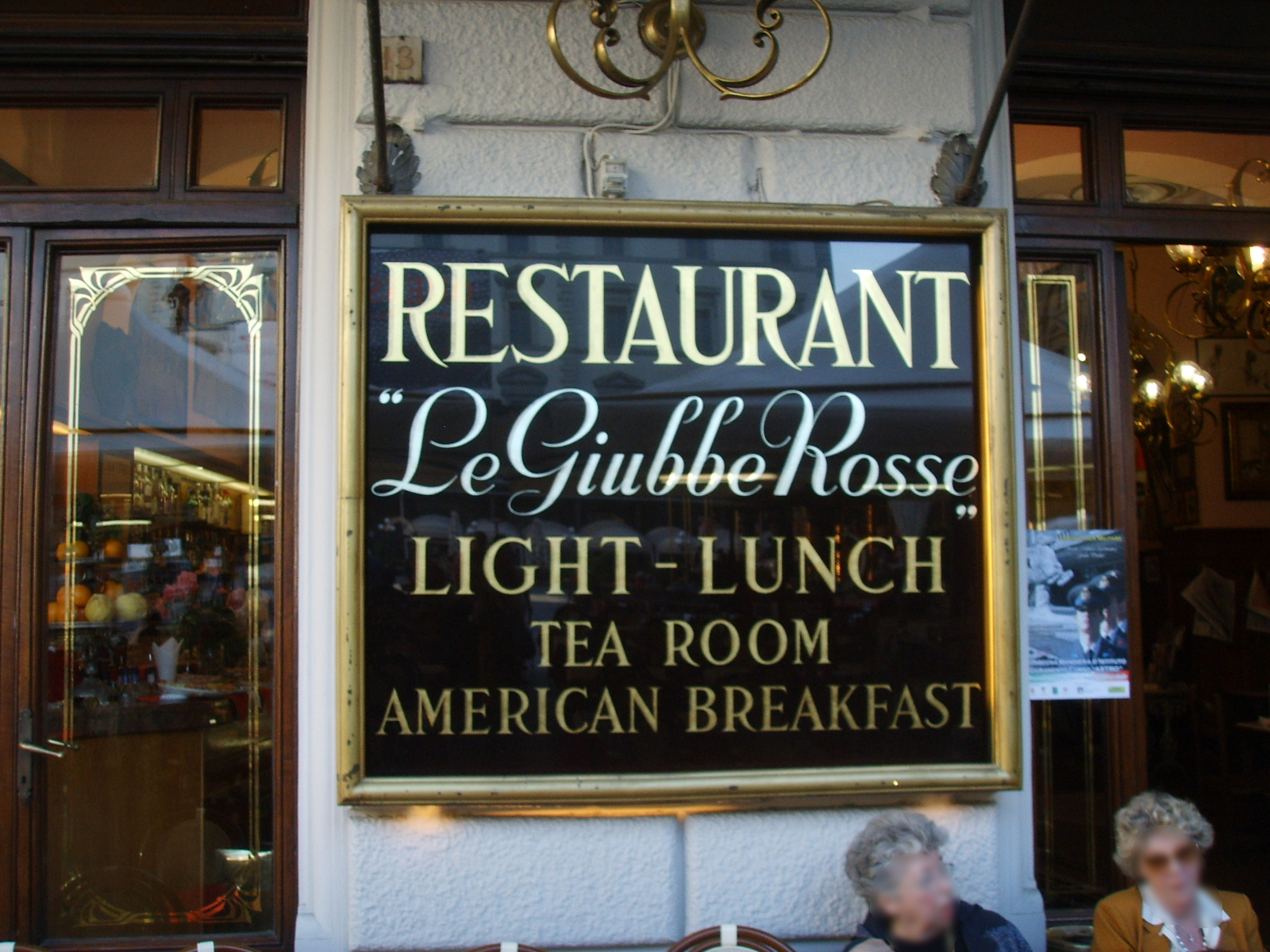
Giubbe Rosse

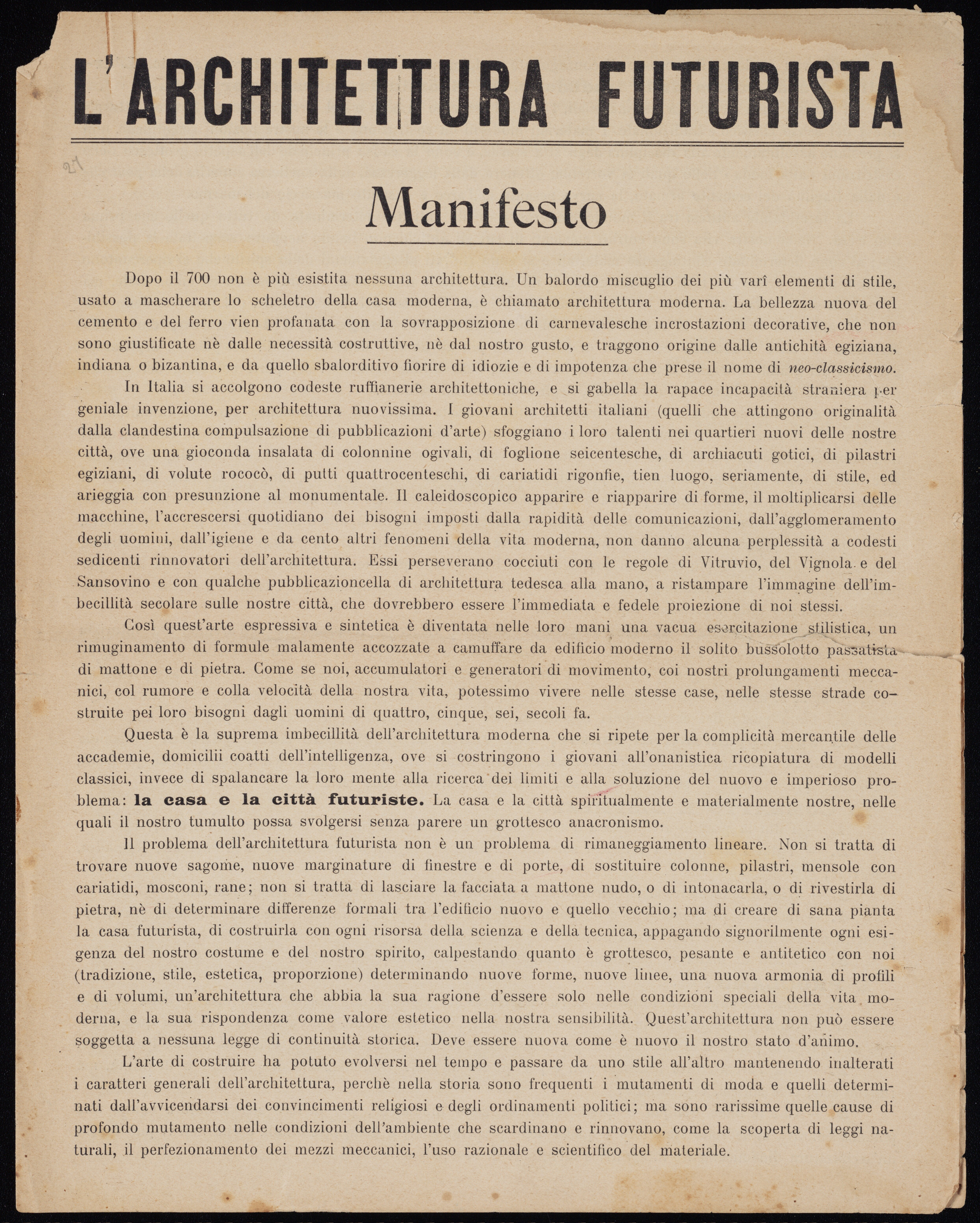
Manifesto of the futurist architecture

Caffè Giubbe Rosse is a historical literary café in Piazza della Repubblica, Florence. When opened in 1896, the cafè was actually called "Fratelli Reininghaus". It was named "Giubbe Rosse" (Red jackets or coats) in 1910, after the red jackets which waiters used to wear every day.

The restaurant-café has a long-standing reputation as the resort of literati and intellectuals. Alberto Viviani defined the Giubbe Rosse as "fucina di sogni e di passioni" ("a forge of dreams and passions"). The Giubbe Rosse was the place where the Futurist movement blossomed, struggled and expanded; it played a very important role in the history of Italian culture as a workshop of ideas, projects, and passions. "We want to celebrate love of danger, of constant energy, and courage. We want to encourage going in aggressive new directions, feverish sleeplessness, running, deathly leaps, slaps and blows".

Poets such as Ardengo Soffici, Giovanni Papini, Eugenio Montale, Filippo Tommaso Marinetti, Giuseppe Prezzolini and many others met and wrote in this literary café an important venue of Italian literature in the beginning of the 20th century.

Important magazines such as Solaria and Lacerba originated here from the writers who frequented the café.

In 2019 on proposal of Italian Ministry of Culture this historical literary café has been proclaimed has a cultural asset.

This cozy literary café, founded by two Germans, the Reininghaus brothers, in 1896, has been closed from 2019 till 2024 for financial problems.

In the end of June 2024 Il Caffé Letterario Giubbe Rosse opened again its activities.

== Some of the most recent exhibitions and presentations ==
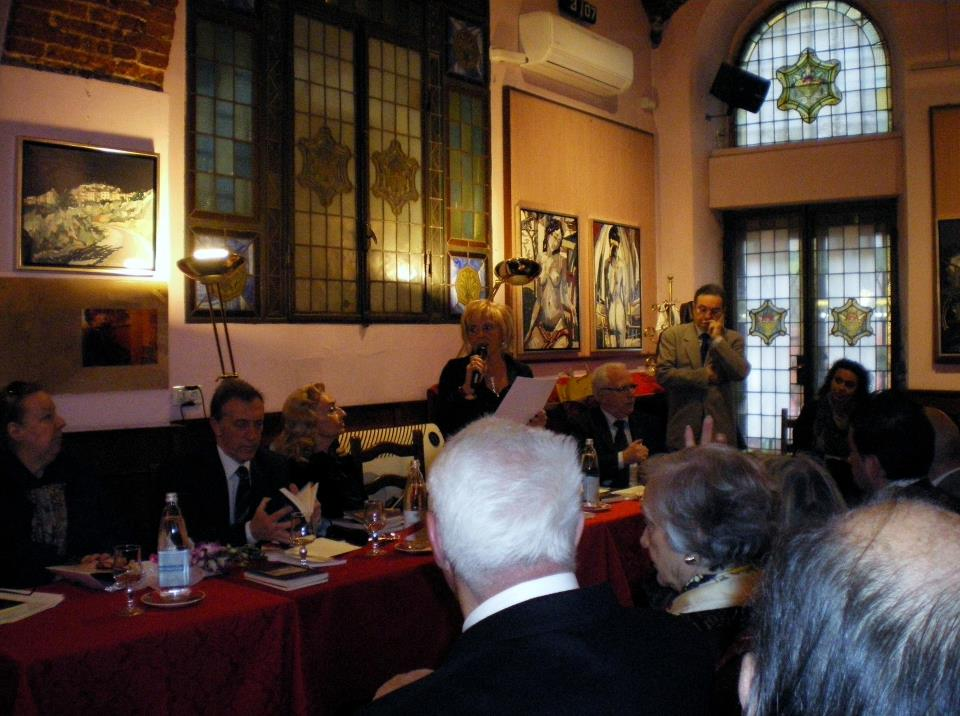
Historical caffè Giubbe rosse Florence

- In 2012 literary meeting with Giorgina poet Busca Gernetti entitled "Classicità e Modernità nella poesia di Giorgina Busca Gernetti". Introduction by Onorevole Marco Cellai. critical relationships of prof. Enrico Nistri, Prof. Anna Maria Giglio, artist Lilly Brogi and the poet Giancarlo Bianchi.
- In 2015 literary meeting the great classical and contemporary poetry interpreted by actor Franco Costantini organized by La Pergola Arte. Franco Costantini before he played Dante Alighieri musical accompaniment on guitar by Raimondo Raimondi spacing out his performance with a dissertation on of endecasillabo value and finally recited the lyrics of Lilly Brogi, Menotti Galeotti, Anna Balsamo, Alfredo Vernacotola, Giancarlo Bianchi, Ornella Fiorentini.
- In 2016 Moran presented the novel by Matilde Calamai . Speakers Giulio Greco and Lilly Brogi was present the doctor Aldo Giovanelli founder of Pengo Life Project and Italian Ambassador of the David Sheldrick Wildlife Trust who spoke about the situation of African wildlife.

== Gallery ==
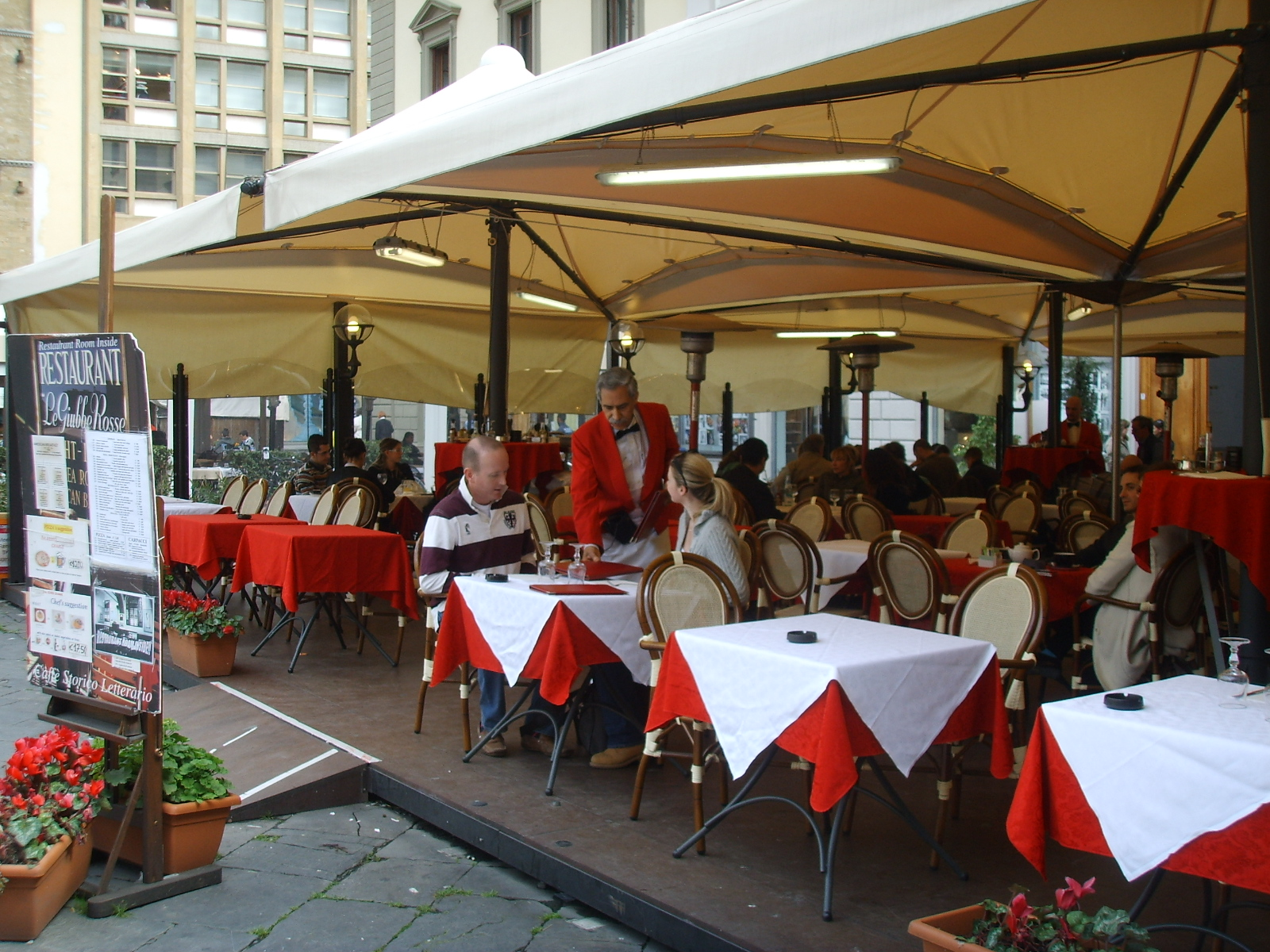
Giubbe rosse

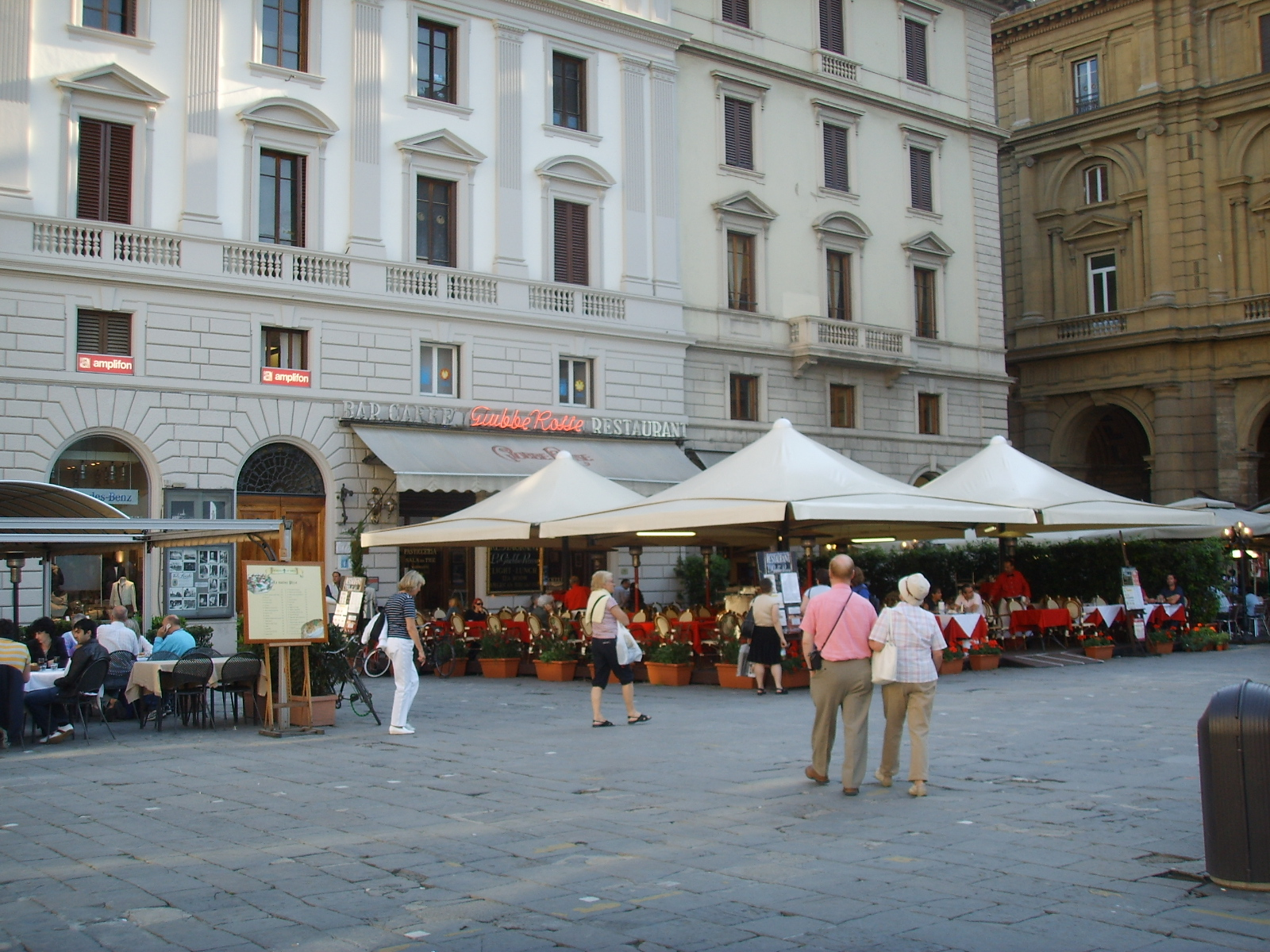
Exterior

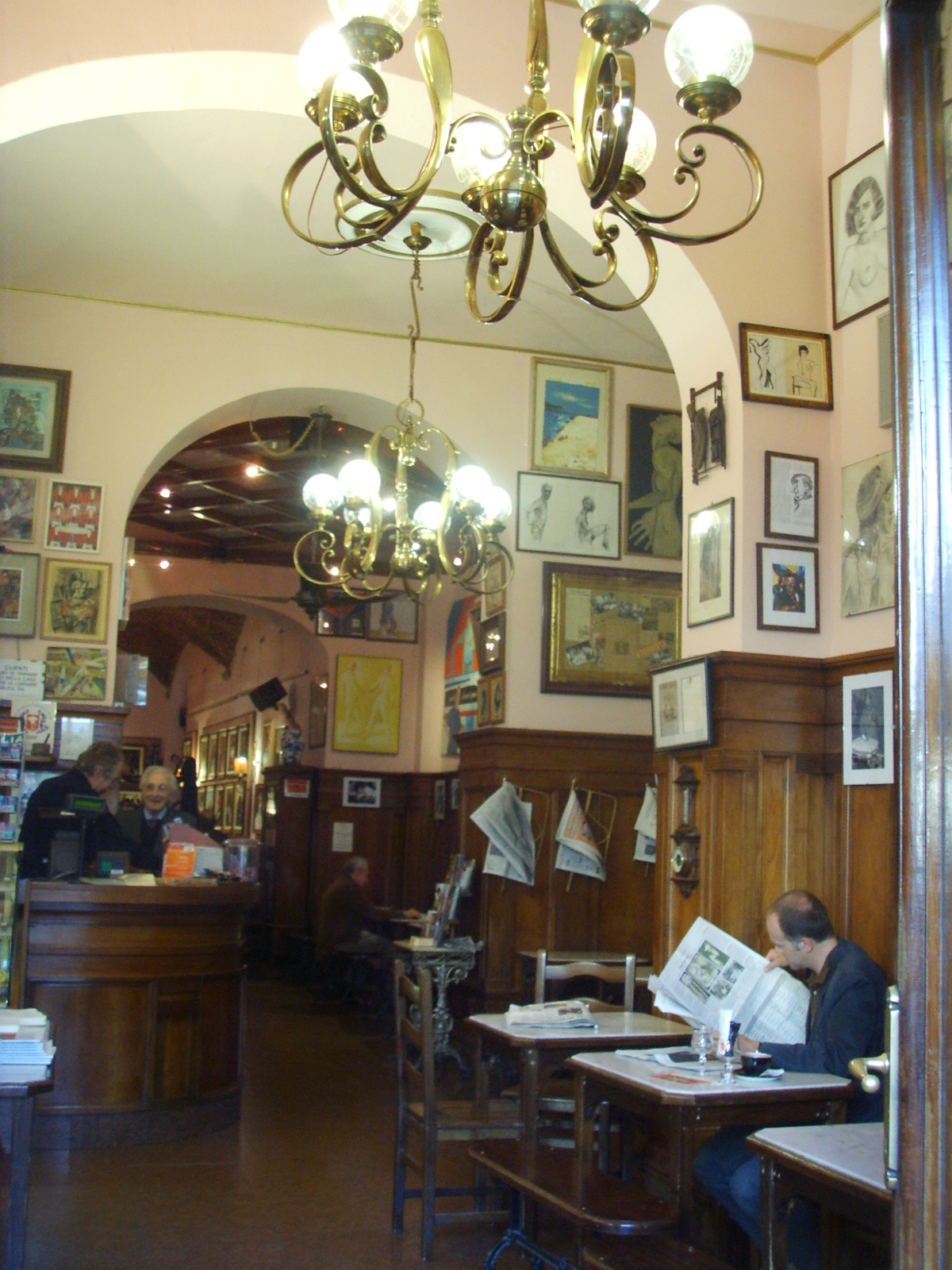
Interior
