= Resul Dindar =

Turkish singer (born 1982)

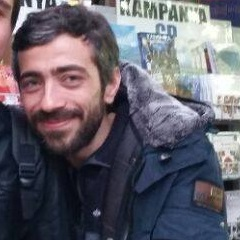

Background information
- Born: 24 January 1982 (age 43); Hopa, Turkey
- Genres: Pop, folk, Turkish folk
- Occupation: Singer-songwriter
- Years active: 2007–present
- Website: resuldindar.com

Resul Dindar (born 24 January 1982) is a Turkish singer. In 2008, he founded the music group Karmate (which in Laz language means mill) with friends, and made the two albums Nani and Nayino. He went solo after 2012, and his first solo album called Divane came out in 2013.

== Discography ==
=== Albums ===
as part of Karmate

- Nani
- Nayino

Solo

- Divane (2013)
- Dalgalan Karadeniz (2014)
- Aşk-ı Meşk (2017)

=== Singles ===
- Sorma (2016)
- Hiç (2016)
- Güzelliğin On Para Etmez (2016)
- Öptüm (2017)
- Eyvallah (2018)
- Yangın Yeri (2018)
- Sevdam ile Beraber (2019)
- Yaşlan Benimle (2020)
- Hiç (Remix) (2020)
- Kapundaki Nar Midur? (with Aslıhan Güner) (2020)
- En Sonum (2020)
- Duman Aldi Dağlara (2020)
- Sırdaş (2021)
- Çift Jandarma (2021)
- Eser Bahar Rüzgarı (with Menekşe Çelik) (2022)
- Sevduğum Diyeceğum (2024)

== See also ==
- Turkish music
