= Gary Smith (EDA analyst) =

- Born: March 9, 1941; Stockton, California
- Died: July 3, 2015 (aged 74); Flagstaff, Arizona
- Education: United States Naval Academy
- Occupations: Electronic engineer, business analyst
- Website: www.garysmitheda.com

Gary Smith (March 9, 1941 – July 3, 2015) was a veteran electronic design automation (EDA) business analyst. He was chief analyst of Gary Smith EDA firm.

== Biography ==
Smith was born in Stockton, California, and grew up in the San Joaquin Valley. He graduated with a bachelor of science degree in engineering from the United States Naval Academy in Annapolis, Maryland. After six years of active duty in Vietnam, he returned to civilian life as a salesperson for semiconductor companies including National Electronics, International Rectifier, TRW Inc., Signetics, Telmos, and Plessey. At Plessey, he transitioned to engineering management for ASICs.

Joining LSI Logic, he became a CAD methodologist implementing the then novel register-transfer level (RTL) design methodology.

From 1994 to 2006 he worked for the market research firm Dataquest (later known as Gartner Dataquest) as managing vice-president and chief analyst for EDA market analysis. From 2006 up to his death, he led his own market research firm, Gary Smith EDA.

He was known for his pre-Design Automation Conference Dataquest briefings with his "What to see at DAC" list. He continued this tradition as an independent analyst.

Annually Smith also updated his so-called wallcharts where he visually listed out vendors organized by tool category.

In 2007 he received an ACM SIGDA Distinguished Service award "in recognition for his contributions as Chief EDA Analyst at Gartner Dataquest for the past two decades".

He died on July 3, 2015, in Flagstaff, Arizona, after a short bout of pneumonia. Gary was married to Lori Kate Smith and they had son Casey. He had daughters Tamara and Kim from his first wife, Diana Lee Smith.

The Gary Smith Memorial Scholarship was set up at the San Jose State University.
