= Pranciškus Tupikas =

Lithuanian politician

Pranciškus Tupikas (January 2, 1929 – July 16, 2015) was a Lithuanian politician. In 1990 he was among those who signed the Act of the Re-Establishment of the State of Lithuania.
