= Hanns Altermann =

German journalist (1891–1963)

Hanns Richard Altermann (1891 – 1963) was a German bookseller, editor, journalist and publisher.

== Life ==
Altermann was born on 8 July 1891 in Dresden.

He was the son of railway secretary Edwin Leopold Altermann and his wife Mathilde born Dressler and was born in the capital of the Kingdom of Saxony. There he attended primary school and the Reform-Realgymnasium. Altermann then took up an apprenticeship as a bookseller in Dresden. He then worked as an assistant in various bookstores in Nuremberg, Hamburg and Düsseldorf. He chose the latter city as the center of his life after working as an editor in Ludwigshafen from 1912 to 1914.

After Hans Altermann had also worked for some time in Düsseldorf as an advertising expert, he founded the Lichtkampf-Verlag Hanns Altermann. As a publisher he worked together with, among others, the writer Robert Theuermeister and with Lotte Herrlich, whose nude photographs he published.

In 1920 Hanns Altermann moved as publisher to Heilbronn, then again in 1922 from Heilbronn to Kettwig. He was also active as an editor of books and magazines, for which he himself wrote numerous articles on literature, the youth movement and educational science, including the literary journal Die Bewegung from 1924 to 1925.

In 1926, Hanns Altermann ceased working for his Lichtkampf publishing house and from then on worked for Henkel.

In 1951, Hanns Altermann wrote his autobiography Vom Handlungsreisenden zum Verkaufsdirektor (From Salesman to Sales Director).

He died in Düsseldorf on 8 September 1963.

== Family ==
Hanns Altermann married Elisabeth born Kossakowski in 1915.

== Literature ==
- Herrmann A. L. Degener: Degeners Wer ist’s?, Berlin 1935, p. 17
- Wilhelm Kosch u. a.: Deutsches Literatur-Lexikon. Das 20. Jahrhundert, Bd. 1: Aa – Bauer, 2011, p. 1997.
