= Bryan O'Linn =

Bryan O'Linn (November 30, 1927 – July 19, 2015) was a Namibian jurist, politician, lawyer and author.

Born in Brandfort, South Africa, O'Linn moved to Namibia when he was a year old. From 1946 to 1952 he was with the South Africa Police instead on serving in the military. He also served as a civil servant and a newspaper reporter before embarking on a career in law in 1961. Prior to Namibia's independence, he defended several Namibian independence fighters in court. O'Linn also chaired Namibia Peace Plan 435 which conducted dialogues with the independence movement.

In 1974, he became the leader of the United National South West Party after serving as vice-chairman. The party renamed itself the National Party in October 1975, staying under O'Linn's leadership, but disintegrated some time later.

O'Linn led the Society of Advocates from 1982 to 1989, prosecuting human rights abuses throughout the country. After Namibia became independent in November 1989, O'Linn became a justice of the High Court. He oversaw cases involving the fishing industry and crime legislation during his tenure on the High Court, which lasted until September 1999, when he was appointed to the Supreme Court. O'Linn served on the Supreme Court until 2006, during which time he published a book in 2003 entitled Namibia: The sacred Trust of Civilization - Ideal and Reality that dealt with Namibian history, struggle for independence, and his opinion on several current issues. A second volume came out in 2010.

O'Linn died in Windhoek on July 19, 2015, after suffering from ill health for several years. He is survived by his wife of 58 years, Miemie. The Namibian called him "a towering figure in Namibia's legal system over the past 50 years." Chief Justice Peter Shivute said, "The late Judge O'Linn's death is a great loss to the legal fraternity of Namibia."
