= Jemera Rone =

American human rights activist

- Born: March 13, 1944; Fort Worth, Texas, US
- Died: July 29, 2015 (aged 71)
- Known for: Human rights activism

Jemera Rone (March 13, 1944 – July 29, 2015) was an American human rights activist. She served as the Human Rights Watch's East Africa coordinator, and was best known for her years of human rights reporting on Sudan.

== Biography ==
Rone was born in Fort Worth, Texas, in 1944 and was raised in Venezuela. She graduated from Barnard College in 1966 and attended Rutgers University Law School. She was a critic of the development of the oil infrastructure in East Africa, believing that it often comes at the expense of the local population, rather than to their benefit.

Rone initiated multiple Human Rights investigations, and oversaw investigations in El Salvador, Honduras, and Nicaragua. She was involved with monitoring human rights in 24 different countries. Rone lived in El Salvador during the Salvadoran Civil War. She reported on the human rights violations committed by the Sandinistas, acting as an alternative to United States information.

Rone died on July 29, 2015, in Washington, D.C. from ovarian cancer at the age of 71.

== Sources ==
- Sudan: Oil Companies Complicit in Rights Abuses Human Rights News November 23, 2003
- "Sudan Government and Rebels Guilty of Deaths in Custody". Human Rights Watch. April 21, 1999. Archived from the original on March 4, 2006.
