= Jens S. Jensen =

Swedish photographer and writer (1946–2015)

Jens Håkan Schleimann-Jensen, known as Jens S. Jensen (25 May 1946 – 1 July 2015) was a Swedish photographer and writer. He is mainly known for his depictions of working class life in Gothenburg, Sweden.

The works of Jens S. Jensen are in the collections of the Swedish Centre for Architecture and Design and the Nordic Museum in Stockholm, the Hasselblad Centre in Gothenburg and the Museum of Modern Art in New York.
