= Alfredo Lardelli =

Swiss businessman and murder

- Born: 25 July 1956
- Died: 21 July 2015 (aged 58); Zürich, Switzerland
- Other name: Alfredo Valerio Borgatte dos Santos
- Occupations: Businessman, real estate broker, procurer
- Status: Released in 1999
- Penalty: 20 years in prison

Details
- Killed: 3

Alfredo Valerio Borgatte dos Santos (né Alfredo Valerio Lardelli; born 25 July 1956 - 21 July 2015) was a Swiss procurer, businessman and convicted triple murderer. In 1989, he was convicted and sentenced to twenty years in prison, for murdering two prostitutes and her husband of his then girlfriend. He was released in 1999 and then engaged in several activities which he once self described as “30 percent as a legal adviser, 30 percent as an estate agent and 40 percent as an adviser for the red light-scene”. He gained his knowledge about jurisprudence autodidactically and wasn't officially permitted to practice his law advisory business. Previous to his conviction he also worked as real estate broker.

== Life ==
He became known to a broad public thanks to the media reporting about his various lawsuits. In 1989, Lardelli was sentenced to twenty years in prison for murdering two prostitutes and the husband of his then-girlfriend. In prison, he married a Brazilian woman and adopted her family name, Borgatte dos Santos. After his early discharge in 1999 due to good behaviour, he had a big media presence, e.g. in Swiss TV and in rainbow press-paper Blick, which dedicated a series to him that lasted six issues. Lardelli wanted to open up an establishment in Wagen (Gemeinde Jona). This led to various legal arguments. Lardelli had to appear in court, because he supposedly threatened to kill an opponent of his project. In 2006 and inspired by Lardelli, legal actions were taken against Ueli Maurer, president of political party SVP, because of alleged falsification of documents; Maurer was acquitted.

Lardelli died of multiple organ failure in 2015 at the age of 58.
