= Horst Walter (footballer) =

German footballer (1939–2015)

Personal information
- Date of birth: 2 July 1939
- Place of birth: Bobritzsch-Hilbersdorf, Germany
- Date of death: 22 July 2015 (aged 76)
- Place of death: Dresden, Germany
- Position: Midfielder

Senior career*
| Years | Team | Apps | (Gls) |
| 1957–1963 | Einheit Dresden | 109 | (22) |
| 1963–1966 | Chemie Halle | 79 | (23) |
| 1966–1969 | Dynamo Dresden | 45 | (1) |
| 1969–1972 | Dynamo Dresden II | | |
| Total | | 233 | (46) |

International career
| 1962 | East Germany | 1 | (0) |
- * Club domestic league appearances and goals

Horst Walter (July 2, 1939 – July 22, 2015) was a German footballer.
