= Alfred E. France =

American businessman and politician

Alfred E. France (June 5, 1927 – July 11, 2015) was an American businessman and politician.

Born in Pennsylvania, France and his family lived in Montana, Iowa, Illinois, North Dakota and, finally, St. Paul, Minnesota. He was in the United States Army during World War II. In 1948, he received his bachelor's degree in political science from University of Pennsylvania. He worked for the Governor of Minnesota as an executive secretary. In 1955, France worked as a public affairs director and lived in Duluth, Minnesota. From 1963 until 1971, France sat in the Minnesota House of Representatives. He died of leukemia at his home in Duluth.
