= David Faber (author) =

Survivor of Nazi concentration camp

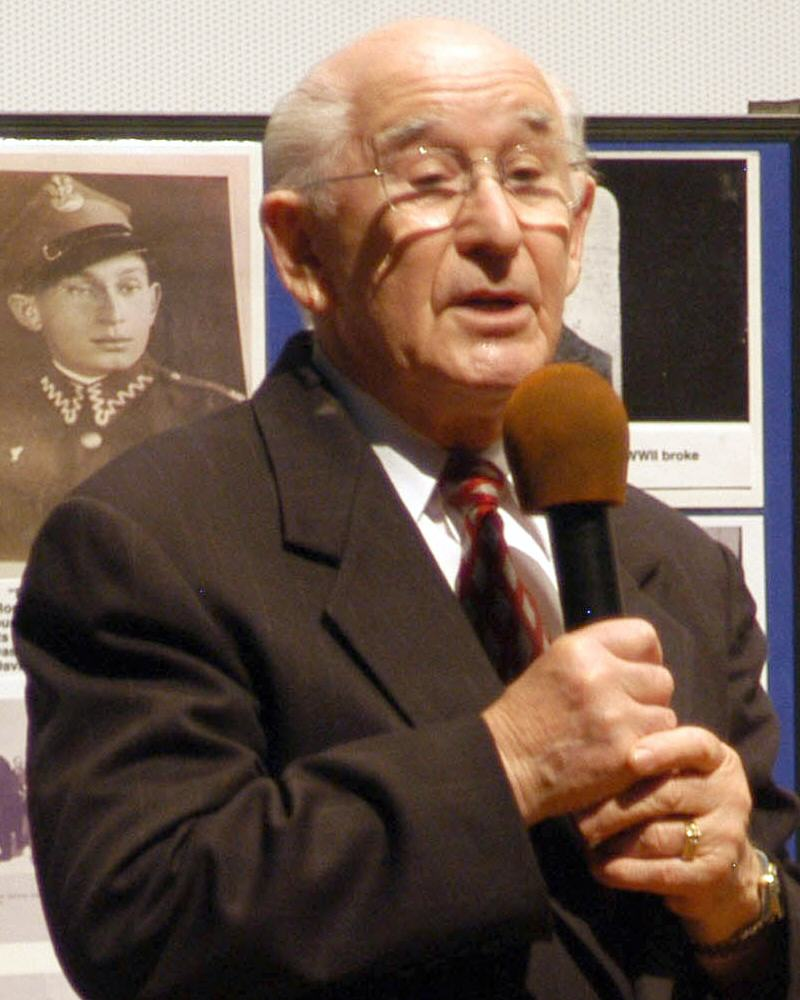
- in May 2006
- Born: 25 August 1928; Nowy Sącz, Poland
- Died: 28 July 2015 (aged 86); San Diego, California, United States
- Occupations: Educator; author
- Spouses: Lina Faber; Tonia Faber

David Faber (25 August 1928 – 28 July 2015) was a Polish Jew who survived nine concentration camps in occupied Poland and Nazi Germany. Faber would be incarcerated within nine different concentration camps, where he would endure witnessing most of his family members killed right in front of him, including his brother Romek who was tortured in front of him. Faber would go on to write about the horrific experiences in his memoir, Because of Romek. He would later dedicate his life to remembering his family through both his memoir and through education. He was also an award-winning educator and lecturer on The Holocaust.

== Early life ==
Prior to the Holocaust, Faber and his family lived in Nowy Sacz, Poland. Faber's family consisted of six sisters, one brother, and his mother and father. They would later flee their home when the Nazis arrived. Faber and his family stayed with a few friends and families’ homes; Faber described the places they were staying in as ‘ghettos’ in his memoir. In 1939 Faber and his family were arrested and taken to Pustkow.

== Life in the camps ==
Faber witnessed the murders of friends and family, the people they were staying with, and some of his extended family, at a dinner table by the Gestapo. He was sent to nine concentration camps in Germany and occupied Poland. Miraculously, he survived. At age 13, he was a fighter with Soviet partisans. Faber recalled seeing many horrible actions in the concentration camps, ranging from seeing a baby thrown into an oven to losing every friend he made in camp. Faber also recalled the horrors of seeing most of his family dead.

He remembered vividly how an Italian friend named Finzi ran into his father's arms and his father was shot right there in front of him. Faber also witnessed his brother tortured right in front of him.

== Liberation and aftermath of the Holocaust ==
When Faber was liberated from Bergen-Belsen in 1945, he was 18 years old and weighed 72 pounds. Faber described the experience as "I was a living skeleton". He said he could not resist anymore, and as soon as he was liberated, he gave up on living. He was found at the side of a road and taken to a hospital.^{[4]} After the war ended, Faber moved to England to live with his sister Rachel, the only other survivor of his immediate family, and worked as a pastry chef in a multitude of locations in England, including the House of Commons. During that period, he married his first wife, Tonia, who Faber met in Bergen-Belson. Faber and Tonia would soon have a son, Solomon. In the 1950s, he moved to the United States. Faber lived for a short time in New York City then moved to Springfield, Massachusetts, where he would live for twenty years. He and his wife later moved to San Diego, California.

In 1966 Faber started receiving communications from the consulate of the Federal German Republic, detailing that Dr. von Keudell wanted to speak with him, that it concerned his brother, Romek. During his meeting with Dr von Keudell, Keudell asked him a few questions regarding his brother. Faber answered the questions, and later he concluded that the questions were pertaining to the double agent that betrayed his brother during World War II.

After Tonia Faber's death in 1986, Faber would remain in San Diego and marry his second wife, Lina.

Faber then would write his memoir, Because of Romek, in 1997, in memory of his older brother, who was murdered by Gestapo interrogators. Faber was a renowned public speaker and educator of the holocaust, in some schools his memoir is a required reading for students. He would go on to talk in various interviews to bring his stories to light.

Faber died in San Diego on July 28, 2015, at the age of 86. He is buried in King David Lawn at Greenwood Memorial Park in San Diego.

== Works ==
- David Faber; James D. Kitchen (1997). Because of Romek: a Holocaust survivor's memoir. Granite Hills Press. ISBN 978-0-9638886-2-4.
