= Neal Falls =

American suspected serial killer (1969–2015)

- Born: Neal Martin Falls; September 24, 1969; Eugene, Oregon, U.S.
- Died: July 18, 2015 (aged 45); Charleston, West Virginia, U.S.
- Cause of death: Gunshot wound

Details
- Victims: 1 assault victim (confirmed); 10+ murdered (suspected)
- Span of crimes: 1992–2015
- Country: United States
- States: Oregon, Nevada, Illinois, Kentucky, Ohio, New York, Texas, and California

Neal Martin Falls (September 24, 1969 – July 18, 2015) was a American suspected serial killer who was shot and killed in self-defense by Heather Saul, a woman in Charleston, West Virginia. Falls had been stopped by police in over twenty states during his life, but did not incur any serious criminal charges.

== Biography ==
Neal Falls was born on September 24, 1969, in Eugene, Oregon, into an impoverished family with nine other children. He spent his childhood and formative years living in various cities around Oregon. During his school years, he began to show an interest in firearms and subsequently became obsessed with military paraphernalia. After leaving high school, Falls engaged in low-wage labor. He was not known to break the law, refrained from abusing alcohol or drugs, and was keen on collecting weapons and ammunition. Most of his friends and acquaintances spoke very positively of him.

In early 1992, Falls moved to Greensburg, Kansas, where he lived with his father until his father's death in 1995. He then returned to Oregon and found a job as a private security guard. After finishing his training, his fingerprints were entered into a national database in 1998. In 2000, Falls moved to Henderson, Nevada, where for the next eight years he worked as a security guard at Hoover Dam. During this period, he began to exhibit deviant behavior, including abusing animals in the desert regions of Arizona, over which he was subjected to disciplinary action. At the same time, Falls began to spend most of his leisure time in the company of various sex workers and pimps. In the mid-2000s, he visited the Philippines for the purpose of sex tourism.

In 2008, Falls was forced to quit his job over alleged sexual harassment. Following the dismissal, he began to frequently change his place of residence. Between 2009 and 2015, he lived in Oregon, Indiana, Kentucky and Texas, where he was detained by police on several occasions for traffic violations. In January 2015, Falls' mother died and Falls found out that the woman he was seeing was married. These two events allegedly greatly affected his emotional state, making him become internally conflicted and disorganized. In April 2015, Falls underwent retraining courses to continue working as a security guard in the private sector in Oregon, but that summer he moved first to Texas and then to Charleston, West Virginia.

== Death and investigation ==
Shortly after moving to West Virginia, Falls encountered a sex worker named Heather Saul online and tracked down her address. After entering Saul's residence, he held her at gunpoint. Saul described the struggle that ensued as follows: "When he strangled me, I grabbed my rake, and when he laid the gun down to get the rake out of my hands, I shot him... I grabbed the gun and shot behind me." Saul shot Falls in the head, killing him instantly. Four sets of handcuffs were retrieved from Falls' body. When police officers searched the inside of his car, they found a machete, axes, knives, a shovel, a sledgehammer, bleach, plastic trash bags, bulletproof vests, clean white socks and underwear.

Police linked the objects found, Falls' apparent modus operandi and his previous known locations to the murders and disappearances of women in three states. During the eight years he lived in Nevada, from 2003 to 2007, several sex workers disappeared, three of whom were later found dismembered in Nevada, California and Illinois. All the missing women, like Saul, advertised their activities on the Internet. In 2014, a dozen sex workers had vanished in and around Chillicothe, Ohio, a two-hour drive from Charleston. Falls is suspected in these disappearances despite the absence of physical evidence. The true scale of Falls' movements and activity remains unknown.

A list containing the names of six women involved in sex work and their contacts on social networks was found in Falls' pocket, which, according to the prosecutor's office, may have been intended victims. However, investigators determined that all of the women were alive and well; five of them were located across West Virginia and the sixth worked in San Diego. In 2018, Falls was tested for involvement in the I-70 Killer murders, a series of killings in the Midwestern United States in the spring of 1992. Falls' time in Kansas overlapped with a murder that had occurred there, and his appearance corresponded to the suspect's image, but no physical evidence was located to corroborate these speculations.

== Possible victims ==
Based on the circumstances surrounding Falls' death, law enforcement conducted an extensive investigation into his background to determine his culpability in any unsolved murders and disappearances. This led the Federal Bureau of Investigation (FBI) to believe that Falls had killed at least ten people. Investigators identified Falls as a suspect in a series of murders targeting sex workers on the Las Vegas Strip from 2003 to 2007, when he was living in Nevada. He was also suspected in the unsolved murders and disappearances of women around Chillicothe, Ohio, located about two hours from Falls' home in Charleston, West Virginia. The disappearances in Chillicothe stopped after Falls was killed.

- Misty Marie Saens (25) disappeared in Las Vegas on March 12, 2003. Her torso was found wrapped in black plastic bags and bed sheets off Nevada State Route 159 near Nevada State Route 160, just west of the city. Her partial remains were found in the desert on a road leading to the Red Rock Canyon National Conservation Area.
- On August 29, 2003, the remains of Jodi Brewer (19) were discovered near a highway in San Bernardino County, California, twenty-five miles from the Nevada border. Brewer's torso had been discovered wrapped in plastic. A further search by investigators uncovered a sheet near the Interstate 15 off-ramp near the Mojave National Preserve. On August 14, Brewer had been dropped off by her boyfriend at the Harbor Island Club Apartments in Las Vegas. Her mother reported her missing on August 15. When interviewed by police, one witness claimed that Brewer got into a white car with California license plates.
- Lindsay Marie Harris (21), a sex worker, disappeared from her home in Henderson, Nevada, on May 4, 2005. She was last observed at a nearby bank making a deposit. At the southern end of the valley, her rental car was discovered abandoned in the desert. On May 23, a group of children discovered human legs in a grassy field a couple hundred yards away from Interstate 55 in Divernon, Illinois, fifteen miles south of Springfield and thirty miles from Butler, where Falls held a firearms permit during that time. It was discovered that both of the legs belonged to the same person after DNA tests were conducted on each of them. The FBI was able to compare the DNA of the unnamed victim that had been submitted by Illinois authorities to Harris' DNA that had been submitted by Henderson authorities in May 2008. After comparing the two DNA samples, the woman's legs were identified as Harris. In 2023, Rex Heuermann, the convicted Gilgo Beach serial killer, came under investigation for potential links to Harris's murder. That same year, in July, AtNight Media asked the Illinois State Police (ISP) for records related to the Harris case, under the Illinois Freedom of Information Act. The ISP denied the request, stating that the investigation was still ongoing.
- Megan Nicole Lancaster (25) was last seen in Wheelersburg, Ohio, on April 3, 2013. That evening, she was supposed to run errands and then head back to her parents' place, but she never did. Two days later, her car was found abandoned at a fast-food restaurant in Portsmouth, with her wallet on the passenger seat.
- Holly Renee Logan (27) was last seen in Columbus, Ohio, on July 21, 2013. She was not reported missing until December 2014. Logan's friend Jayme Malynn Bowen (22) was last seen in the area of Parsons and Stewart Avenues in Columbus on April 10, 2014, as she was walking a few blocks from her sister's house to her parents' home.
- Charlotte Eliza Trego (27) was last seen in Chillicothe, Ohio, on May 3, 2014. She had been living with a roommate on Ewing Street, but after the roommate evicted her she departed on foot. She has never been heard from again. Mother of three Tameka Lynch (30), who was friends with Trego, went missing on the same day. Three weeks after her disappearance, Lynch's nude body was discovered in Paint Creek; the autopsy determined she had died from an overdose of cocaine, alcohol and amphetamines, although the exact circumstances of her death are unknown. Her family believes she was murdered.
- Wanda Jean Lemons (37) was last seen in Chillicothe, Ohio, on November 3, 2014; her last communications with her family were messages to her adult daughter via text and Facebook. Lemons was last seen trying to hitchhike to Galveston, Texas.
- Shasta Himelrick (20) was last seen in Chillicothe, Ohio, on December 25, 2014. She was seen on CCTV from a Speedway gas station at around 3:15 a.m. Her car was found abandoned the next day at a road junction near Higby Bridge, which crosses the Scioto River in south-eastern Ross County. The driver and passenger doors were open, the battery was dead and the car was out of fuel. Himelrick's body was found in the Scioto River on January 2, 2015. Her family strongly disagreed with the coroner's determination that she had committed suicide by drowning, and insisted that she was murdered and dumped in the river.
- Tiffany Sayre (26) went missing on May 11, 2015. Her body was found by two people walking along a creek bed along Cave Road in Highland County, Ohio, about thirty miles west of Chillicothe, on June 27. She had been last seen in the evening heading to the Chillicothe Inn, which had a reputation as a site for prostitution. Sayre's body was found wrapped in a sheet. Her death was deemed a homicide.

== See also ==
- List of serial killers in the United States
