= Tom Harpley =

Profile
- Position: End

Personal information
- Born: April 8, 1929; Winnipeg, Manitoba, Canada
- Died: July 21, 2015 (aged 86); Winnipeg, Manitoba, Canada
- Listed height: 6 ft 0 in (1.83 m)
- Listed weight: 200 lb (91 kg)

Career history
- 1951–1952: Toronto Argonauts
- 1953–1954: Winnipeg Blue Bombers

Awards and highlights
- Grey Cup champion (1952)

Thomas Stewart Harpley (April 8, 1929 – July 21, 2015) was a Canadian professional football player who played for the Toronto Argonauts and Winnipeg Blue Bombers. He won the Grey Cup with Toronto in 1952. He previously played junior football for the Junior Toronto Balmy Beach Beachers. Harpley was later a chiropractor in Winnipeg. where he died in 2015.
