= Robert Rapson (artist) =

New Zealand ceramicist

- Born: 19 November 1951
- Died: 27 January 2020

Robert Rapson (19 November 1951 – 27 January 2020) was a New Zealand ceramicist.

In 2021 there was an exhibition of his work at the Dowse Art Museum called Against the Tide.
