= Because of Romek =

Book written by David Faber

Because of Romek: A Holocaust Survivor's Memoir is a book written by David Faber. The book chronicles the events in the life of Faber and the horrors of living in Nazi concentration camps. All of Faber's family was killed except his sister who was in England at the time. Faber's brother, Romek (a nickname), was a Polish soldier and a prisoner of war in Buchenwald. After his release from Buchenwald, he was active in the Polish Underground. Romek was eventually caught and tortured for information before he was murdered in front of his brother Faber.

== Review ==
Sonia Eliot of the San Diego Reader wrote:

There's one scene – he was staying with his family in an empty apartment in the ghetto, and there was a bakery downstairs. Someone had left some flour there from when they were working there, and his family was using that to make bread. At one point, they were actually living pretty decently for the times – they had some food. And then the Germans came and caught them and saw all the food they had, and that was the point where they basically killed his whole family. He was hiding under the bed – his brother protected him by lying. I think he was 13 at the time. After that, he survived by sheer luck. He was moved from camp to camp, and he met people. At Auschwitz, he befriended a doctor who sometimes gave him food – he says that from time to time, he would actually gain a little weight. He just survived that way until the soldiers finally came and liberated them.

== See also ==
- The Holocaust
- Buchenwald concentration camp
- Polish Underground State
