= Reynaldo González López =

Cuban IOC member (1948–2015)

Reynaldo Gonzalez Lopez (14 September 1948 – 4 July 2015) was a Cuban-born member on the International Olympic Committee (IOC). He served the IOC from 1995 representing Cuba. He also held offices in several international sports administrations. He had a bachelor in pedagogical sciences and a degree in social sciences.

He died in Mexico City on 4 July 2015 at the age of 66.

== Sports administration offices ==
- Secretary General, NOC (1984-200)
- 1st Vice President, Instituto Nacional de Deportes, Educación Fisica y Recreación (INDER) (1981-1994)
- President, INDER (1994-7)
- 1st Vice President, International Baseball Association (IBA) (1988–1999)
- President, IBAF Ethics committee (1999-?)
- President, Cuban Amateur Baseball Federation (1981–1999)
- Secretary General, Organizing Committee of the XI Panamerican Games (Copan '91)
- Vice President, Organizing Committee of the XIV Central American and Caribbean Games (Havanna '82)
- National Director, University Sports (1997–2001)
- Coordinator General, Panamerican Olympic Solidarity (2001-?)

=== Olympics ===
He was a member of the Women and Sport Working Group for 1996–2001, and became a member of the Women and Sport Commission in 2006. He was also a member of the editorial committee of the 2009 Olympic Congress for 2007–2009.
