= Alfonso Serrano =

Mexican sailor (1921–2015)

Alfonso Serrano (6 January 1921 – 9 July 2015) was a Mexican sailor who competed in the 1964 Summer Olympics.
