= Peter Záboji =

Hungarian entrepreneur

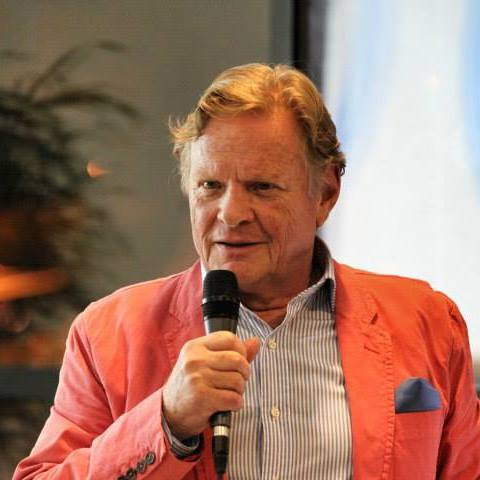
- Born: 25 December 1943
- Died: 3 July 2015 (aged 71)
- Education: INSEAD
- Occupation: business angel
- Website: zaboji.com

Peter (Balazs) Záboji (25 December 1943 – 3 July 2015) was an angel investor and entrepreneur. Much of the Budapest's success as a startup hub has been credited to Peter B. Záboji and his European Entrepreneurship Foundation (EEF). He has contributed significantly to the development of start up businesses in Budapest and received the highest civil recognition from the president of Hungary.

Záboji organized the first European Entrepreneurship Accelerator Program in 2006 as well as the first Seedcamp weekend in Hungary in 2012. He was the founder and president of European Entrepreneurship Foundation, which is the oldest business incubator in Eastern Europe.

Záboji has lived and worked in Germany, France, the United States and the United Kingdom, as an executive manager in the telecom industry and a private equity investor. In 2008, he returned to Hungary, after setting up the European Entrepreneurship Foundation. He worked with and supported various entrepreneurship and angel networks throughout Europe. He was a frequent speaker at private equity and entrepreneurship conferences.

== Early life and education ==
Zaboji and his family left Budapest in 1956, during Hungarian Revolution of 1956. He attended the European Gymnasium Burg Kastl in Bavaria. After his university studies in Leuven and Munich, he completed an MBA at INSEAD. He also holds a B.A. in Physics and Mathematics and a M.Sc. in business (Diplom-Kaufmann) from LMU Munich.

== Career ==
Záboji started his career in IBM Germany with a job that he took in 1970. Later, he joined Siemens, and spent the next eighteen years working with the company in the US as well as Germany. In 1991, he was appointed as the managing director of GPT Communications in the UK. He co-founded Schoeller International in 1993, introducing a new packaging system which later became known as IFCO.

In 1997 Záboji was appointed managing director of o.tel.o, a German telecom start-up. Two years later, he founded the European Telco Exchange AG, which launched in 2000 and went for IPO in 2005. In early 2000 the private equity firm KKR made one of its first buyouts in Europe with Bosch Telekom. Záboji helped prepare the deal and was appointed CEO upon the acquisition. The company was turned around by Záboji, renamed Tenovis and later sold to Avaya. In early 2004, Záboji was a lead investor in acquiring European Mobile Telephone Services Germany. The company was renamed Bitronic and is today a consumer service company for computer and communication products

He was a member of the Board of the Budapest Festival Orchestra, chairman of Digital Factory, and a member of advisory Board of many organizations including Common Sense Society Budapest and White Bull, a forum of European entrepreneurs.

=== Teaching ===
In 2003, upon resignation from active management he was invited by INSEAD to be one of the first three Entrepreneurs in Residence. A few months later he was appointed professor of entrepreneurship. He organized business venture competitions and represented the school as speaker at entrepreneurship and private equity conferences across Europe.

In 2009, Záboji initiated a pilot course on entrepreneurship at the St Ignatius College, Budapest. In the fall of that year he launched a program for US alumni at Ybl club. For more than 2 years, Záboji lectured on Entrepreneurship at CEU Business School, Budapest. In 2013, the Startup Accelerator Course Peter had designed originally for INSEAD was launched at ESSCA. He organized entrepreneurship workshops in Bratislava, Cluj, Prague and Sofia.

=== Business angel ===
During the first dot com revolution Záboji was approached by venture capital companies like Wellington Partners and offered board positions. In 1999, as chairman of ACG, he helped them make their debut at the Frankfurt's Neue Markt. Since then, Záboji has been active as a business angel and sat on the boards of several new European ventures.

In 2005 he established the European Entrepreneurship Foundation (EEF) and launched the first business accelerator program in 2006 and INSEAD that helped several new ventures in launching. EEF, since 2009, provides several programs and events in the CEE capitals to promote entrepreneurship and build an ecosystem for business creation. He also helped build Europreneurs.org, an ecosystem for entrepreneurship and venture capital in Central and Eastern Europe.

In October 2013, Záboji was chosen by the National Innovation Office of Hungary as one of the four technology incubators whose mission will be to accelerate the growth of the local startup ecosystem by receiving a funding from the Hungarian state for 20 grants worth around 5,500,000 EUR in total.

=== Books ===
In 2002, he authored the management book, “CHANGE! Shape today your company of tomorrow” (Moderne Industrie, 2002). In the book, he discussed about how he turned Bosch Telekom into Tenovis. Later in 2014, he published, Startup, Felnőtteknek! (Start up for Grown Ups) in Hungarian.

== Personal life ==
Záboji moved back to Budapest in 2008 and spent the rest of his days in the CEE region with his wife and three children. He was fluent in English, German, French and Hungarian.

He died on July 3, 2015, in Budapest. As per his last will, the Budapest Festival Orchestra played Mozart's Requiem led by Ivan Fischer at his memorial service.

== Bibliography ==
- CHANGE! Shape today your company of tomorrow (2002)
- Startup, Felnőtteknek! (Startup for grown-ups) (2014)
