= Bill Foord =

English cricketer (1924–2015)

Charles William Foord (11 June 1924 – 8 July 2015) was an English first-class cricketer from Scarborough, Yorkshire, England, who played 51 first-class matches for Yorkshire County Cricket Club between 1947 and 1953. He also played a first-class game for the North of England in 1947, and appeared in the Yorkshire Second XI from 1947 to 1953.

A right arm fast medium bowler, he took 128 wickets at 27.1 with a best of 6 for 63 against Hampshire County Cricket Club. He took 5 wickets in an innings 5 times. A right-handed lower order batsman, he scored 125 runs at 6.25 with a top score of 35.

He died on 8 July 2015.
