= La Ginebrosa =

- municipality
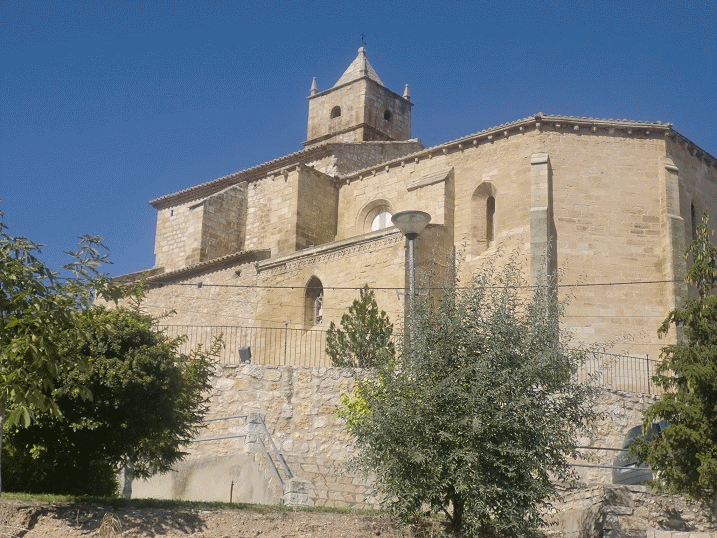
- Church of Saint Bartholomew

- Flag Coat of arms

- Location of La Ginebrosa within Aragon Location of La Ginebrosa within Spain
- Coordinates: 40°52′N 0°8′W
- Country: Spain
- Autonomous community: Aragon
- Province: Teruel

Area
  - Total: 80 km^{2} (31 sq mi)
- Elevation: 702 m (2,303 ft)

Population (2025-01-01)
  - Total: 188
  - Density: 2.4/km^{2} (6.1/sq mi)
- Time zone: UTC+1 (CET)
  - Summer (DST): UTC+2 (CEST)

La Ginebrosa (Spanish: [la xineˈβɾosa]; Catalan: [la ʒineˈβɾoza]) is a municipality located in the province of Teruel, Aragon, Spain. According to the 2018 census (INE), the municipality has a population of 200 inhabitants.

== See also ==
- List of municipalities in Teruel
