= Lalubha Jadeja =

Indian cricketer (1922–2015)

Personal information
- Full name: Lalubha Ramsinhji Jadeja
- Born: 30 August 1922; Sanala, British India (now in Gujarat)
- Died: 19 July 2015 (aged 92); Adipur, Gujarat, India
- Source: ESPNcricinfo, 24 March 2016

Lalubha Jadeja (30 August 1922 – 19 July 2015) was an Indian cricketer. He played first-class cricket for Saurashtra and Services.
