= Alfredo Vernacotola =

Italian writer and poet (1978–2015)

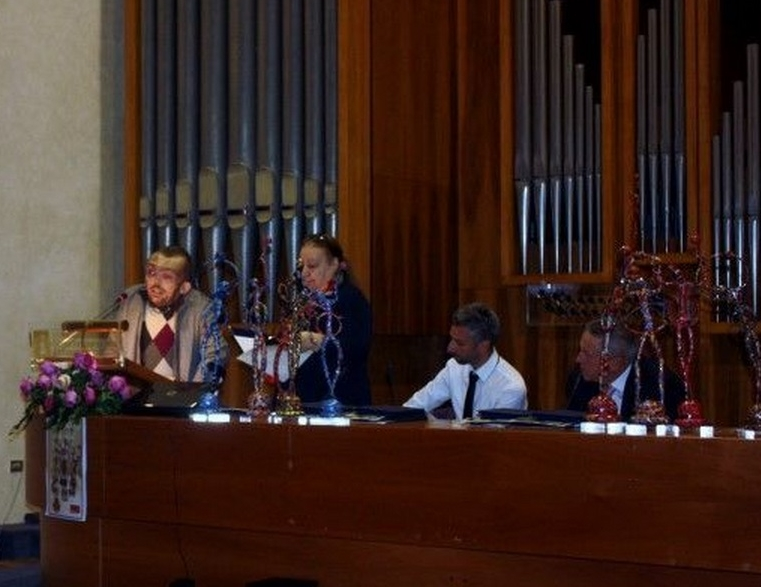
- Alfredo Vernacotola primo classificato poesia edita 2014 a Firenze
- Born: 27 April 1978; L'Aquila, Italy
- Died: 29 July 2015 (aged 37); L'Aquila, Italy
- Occupations: poet, writer,
- Writing career
- Notable awards: first prize in the international literary prize "Lilly Brogi La Pergola arte" of Florence, 2014.

Alfredo Vernacotola (27 April 1978 – 29 July 2015) was an Italian poet and writer.

== Biography ==
Alfredo Vernacotola was born in L'Aquila, Italy, lived and worked in L'Aquila. After graduation he began a journey that takes him to the scientific cultural psychology degree in Psychology Applied Sciences - University of L'Aquila academic year 2009 -2010 and master's degree in Clinical Psychology and Health Dynamics - University of L'Aquila ( academic year 2010 - 2011 and numerous qualifications in the field of studies in philosophy and psychology). Alfredo Vernacotola modern science writer for the amount of publication of articles in online journals as a collaborator and export of psychology and philosophy. Recall the close cooperation with the online magazine of Archetypal Psychology "L'anima fa arte" Numerous reviews for poets and artists Italians who met in his literary journey began with the publication of the book of poetry "La danza dell'Anima" published in 2014 by Arduino Sacco Editore, in 2015 published a further poetic book "Immaginando l'indefinito" by Arduino Sacco Editore land the same year he published the storybook "Dallo scorpione alla vita" Arduino Sacco Editore. In 2014 he received first prize in Florence for the book "La danza dell'Anima" and in 2015 il was presented at the historic Caffè literary "Caffè Giubbe Rosse" of Florence. Important scientific publications of 2012 " Gli immaginari femminili di un uomo. Il caso clinico" published by Gruppo Albatros il Filo 2014 and "Campo d'arte educazione alla vita. Esprimenti di pedagogia in periferia" published Libreria Universitaria Benedetti.

== Literature ==
In 2012 published the book "Gli immaginari femminili di un uomo. Il caso clinico" with Gruppo Albatros Il Filo Editore. In 2014 publishes book of poems"La danza dell'Anima" with Arduino Sacco Editore and received the first prize for poetry published in international literary prize "Lilly Brogi La Pergola Arte" of Florence sixth edition and in 2015 the seventh edition had a special prize for poetry and religion. In 2015 public the scientific book “Campo d'arte educazione alla vita. Esprimenti di pedagogia in periferia” by Libreria Universitaria Benedetti. In 2015 public the book of poems "Immaginando l'Indefinito" published by Arduino Sacco Editore. In 2015 presents in Florence at the Historic Caffè “Caffè Giubbe Rosse” the book of poems "La danza dell'Anima" recital by the actor Franco Costantini. In the same year he publics the storybook "Dallo scorpione alla vita. Scritti vari" and the scient. In 2016 at the library Mondadori of L'Aquila was presented Dallo scorpione alla vita speakers: Alessandra Vernacotola, Lilly Brogi, Walter Marola, Peter Michael Musone.

== Published works ==
- Vernacotola, Alfredo (2012). Gli immaginari femminili di un uomo. Il caso clinico (in Italian). Gruppo Albatros Il Filo. ISBN 9788856758092.
- Vernacotola, Alfredo (2014). La danza dell'Anima (in Italian). Arduino Sacco Editore. ISBN 9788863549133.
- Vernacotola, Alfredo (2014). Campo d'arte educazione alla vita. Esprimenti di pedagogia in periferia (in Italian). Libreria Universitaria Benedetti. ISBN 9788887182651.
- Vernacotola, Alfredo (2015). Immaginando l'Indefinito (in Italian). Arduino Sacco Editore. ISBN 9788869510380.
- Vernacotola, Alfredo (2015). Dallo scorpione alla vita. Scritti vari (in Italian). Arduino Sacco Editore. ISBN 9788869510687.

== Poetry anthologies ==
- Bianchi, Giancarlo (2015). Poeti in bici (in Italian). Edizioni Polistampa. ISBN 9788859614647.
- Cervellera, Aldo (2015). Premio Poesia Sacravita (in Italian). Misericordia di Firenze.

== Literary Bibliography ==
- Brogi, Lilly; Musone, Peter Michael (2016). Alfredo Alfredo... Un anno di poesia (in Italian). youcanprint. ISBN 9788892607576.

== Awards and honors ==
- 2013, fourth prize in the international literary prize “Phintia” of Licata.
- 2014, first prize in the international literary prize "Lilly Brogi La Pergola arte" of Florence
