= J. P. C. Roach =

British historian

John Peter Charles Roach (1920–2015) was a British historian, Life Fellow of Corpus Christi College, Cambridge and Emeritus Professor of Education at the University of Sheffield. As an academic, author, editor and historian, he made a significant contribution to the study of the history of education. In 1967 he wrote a History of the City and University of Cambridge which at the time was considered by some to be the standard history of the university despite its intention to be merely an outline.

== Life ==
Roach was born in 1920 and educated at Bedford Modern School. After war service in the Indian Army he graduated with first class honours from Corpus Christi College, Cambridge.

Roach became a master at Haileybury for some years before returning to Corpus Christi College as a Fellow. He was later appointed Professor of Education in the Institute of Education at the University of Sheffield. His academic work primarily focused on the history of education and the history of the University of Cambridge.

Roach died in Yorkshire on 11 July 2015.

== Selected works ==
- The City and University of Cambridge. Published by Oxford University Press, 1959
- The Victoria History of the County of Cambridgeshire and the Isle of Ely. Published by Dawsons of Pall Mall, London, 1967
- A Bibliography of Modern History. Published by Cambridge University Press, 1968
- Public Examinations in England 1850–1900. Published by Cambridge University Press, 1971
- Social Reform in England, 1780–1880. Published by St. Martin's Press, New York, 1978
- A History of Secondary Education in England, 1800–1870. Published by Longman, New York, 1986
- Secondary Education in England, 1870–1902: Public Activity and Private Enterprise. Published by Routledge, New York City, 1991
