= Joseph D. Kimbrew =

First African American Chief of the Indianapolis, IN Fire Department

- Born: May 31, 1929; Indianapolis, IN
- Died: July 16, 2015; Indianapolis, IN
- Resting place: Crown Hill Cemetery

Joseph D. Kimbrew (May 31, 1929 - July 16, 2015) was the first African American appointed as chief of the Indianapolis Fire Department. In 1968, he received the first "Firefighter of the Year" award for the city.

== Early life and family ==
Kimbrew graduated from Crispus Attucks High School in January 1948. He went on to serve in the United States Army, from which he was honorably discharged. Kimbrew was married to Carolyn Scott Kimbrew for 62 years and together they had one son, one daughter, and multiple grandchildren.

== Career ==
In 1955, Kimbrew joined the Indianapolis Fire Department and worked in multiple stations across Indianapolis. In 1968, he was awarded the first "Firefighter of the Year" award. On January 19, 1987, Mayor William Hudnut of Indianapolis, appointed Joseph Kimbrew as Chief of the Indianapolis Fire Department. During his time as chief, Kimbrew expanded emergency services to include technicians trained to administer advanced assistance for heart-attack victims. He was familiar with both fire suppression and emergency medical services. He retired from the department in 1992.

== Death and legacy ==
Joseph Kimbrew died on July 16, 2015, and the following year, Indianapolis Fire Department Fire Station 1 was renamed in his honor.

== External sources ==
- Twenty-First Annual Commencement Program for Crispus Attucks High School (Kimbrew is listed in January 1948 graduates)
- Joseph Kimbrew's 1948 yearbook photo
- Press Release from Mayor Hudnut's office announcing Joseph Kimbrew's Appointment - University of Indianapolis Archives
