= Hoza'a Sherif =

Lebanese diplomat

Hoza'a Sherif (c. 1961 – July 22, 2015) was a Lebanese diplomat who served as Lebanon's Ambassador to Iraq from 2006 until his death in 2015.

Sherif died following a long battle with cancer at the American-Lebanese University Hospital in Beirut on July 22, 2015, at the age of 54. He was buried in his hometown of Yammouna, Lebanon.
