= Rafael Navarro (photographer) =

Spanish photographer

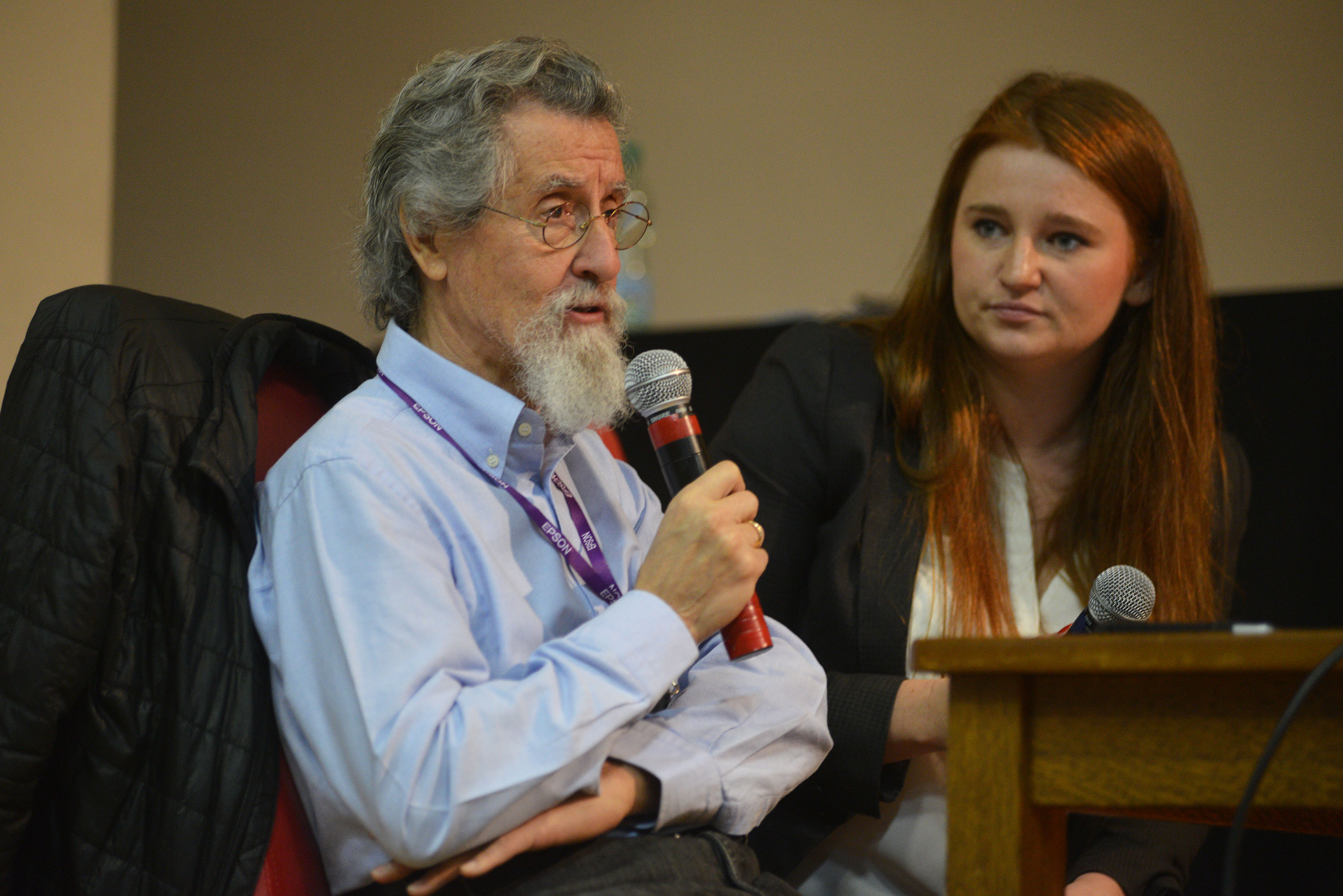
Navarro during FotoArtFestival in Bielsko-Biala, 2015

Rafael Navarro Garralaga (born 8 October 1940 in Zaragoza) is a Spanish art photographer.

== Biography ==
Navarro's interest in photography began in the 1970s, starting his career on theatre and sports photography. But finally, he became very fond of visual arts where he started to develop a more personal language. We can point out of his career on the photograph series that he has actually broken up with the medium and that he has contributed to the creation of an alternative photographic discourse, as for example the diptychs, which a combination of two images appear without connection, offering a photographic different and unusual view. He was very active in the world of photography, founding in 1977 with Manuel Esclusa, Joan Fontcuberta y Pere Formiquera, the group Alabern. A year later he was appointed representative of the Lationamerican Council of Photography and in 1985 member of the Advising Counsel of the Miró’s Foundation. His works have been exhibited in art galleries and museums all over the world in more than 500 occasions and it is part of important collections like the Bibliothèque Nationale, la Maison européenne de la photographie of Paris, the contemporary museums of Brussels, Mexico, Buenos Aires or Japan, as well as the Pilar i Joan Miró’s collections, the Institut Valencià d'Art Modern or the Centro de Arte Reina Sofía. Among his more than 700 publications we must enhance books like Dípticos (1986), Le forme del corpo (1997), Catalogue Raisonné 1975-1998 (2000), Don’t disturb (2001), Photobolsillo 44 (2002), En el taller de Miró (2006) and the recent Cuerpos Iluminados (2006).

== Individual exhibitions ==
- “Dípticos”, Biennale Internazionale di Fotografia di Brescia, Brescia, Italia (2004)
- Galería Moisés Pérez de Albéniz, Pamplona, España (2005)
- Instituto Cervantes, Milán, Italia (2005)
- "Introspecciones" Instituto Cervantes, Beijing, China (2007)
- "Introspecciones" Instituto Cervantes, Shanghai, China (2008)

== Collective exhibitions ==
- “Fotografía en los años 80 y 90 en la Colección del MNCARS”, Museo d’Art Espanyol Contemporani, Palma de Mallorca, Spain (2004)
- “Agua al desnudo”, Fundación Canal, Madrid, Spain (2004)
- “Paris Photo’ 04”, Paris, France (2004)
- Kopavogur Art Museum, Kovavogur, Iceland (2004)
- Feira de Arte Contemporánea 2004, Lisbon, Portugal (2004)
- “Experimentación en la Colección de Fotografía del IVAM”, Fundación Astroc, Madrid, Spain (2004)
- “Arco 2005”, Madrid, Spain (2005)
- Photography in Houston Galleries. Inter – Bienal Foto Fest, De Santos Gallery, Houston, Estados Unidos (2005)
- Colección Fotográfica del Museo de Arte Moderno, Museo de Arte Moderno, Mexico, (2005)
- “Art Cologne 2005”, Cologne, Germany (2005)
- Paris Photo 05, Paris, France (2005)
- Feira de Arte Contemporánea 2005, Lisbon, Portugal (2005)

== Bibliography ==
- Le nu photographié, ed. Actes Sud, Arles, France (2000)
- Festival de la Luz – XI Encuentros abiertos de fotografía 2000, Buenos Aires, Argentina (2000)
- Navarro, Rafael : Catalogue Raisonné 1975–1998. (Collection Photogalerie M+M Auer), ed. Ides et Calendes, Neuchâtel, Suisse (2000)
- Paris Photo 1998, 1999 y 2000 –-Salon International de Photographie, Paris, France.
