= Đuka Galović =

Croatian musician and songwriter (1924–2015)

Đuka Galović (8 April 1924, in Drenovci – 11 July 2015) was a Croatian folk musician and songwriter.

He is best known for dialect tambur songs such as Slavonci smo i Hrvati pravi, Oko Studve i bistrog Bosuta and Odavno smo graničari stari ("Border guards of old"). The latter deals with the defense of Croatia from the Ottoman Empire. The song speaks of border guards of old, long keeping the border on the river Sava:

Odavno smo graničari stari,

čuvali smo granicu na Savi, granicu na Savi. Čuvali smo granicu na Savi,

granicu na Savi.
