= Sam Bulbulia =

South African cricketer (1933–2015)

Personal information
- Born: 22 February 1933; Johannesburg, South Africa
- Died: 10 July 2015 (aged 82); Johannesburg, South Africa
- Source: Cricinfo, 25 March 2016

Sam Bulbulia (22 February 1933 – 10 July 2015) was a South African cricketer. He played three first-class matches for Transvaal in 1972/73.
