= Fraser Scott =

Brigadier Fraser Scott (9 September 1919 – 6 July 2015) was Director of Weapons for the British Army. After his retirement from the army, he founded the Defence Manufacturers' Association in 1976. He was born in Salisbury's Cathedral Close. His father was a gunnery instructor on Salisbury Plain.
