= Luigi Martella =

Italian Roman Catholic bishop

Coat of arms of Luigi Martella

Luigi Martella (9 March 1948 – 6 July 2015) was a Roman Catholic bishop.

Ordained to the priesthood in 1977, Martella was named bishop of the Roman Catholic Diocese of Molfetta-Ruvo-Giovinazzo-Terlizza, Italy.
