= Jules Hirsch =

American physician and researcher

Jules Hirsch (April 6, 1927 – July 23, 2015) was an American physician and researcher known for his work on obesity. He was a longtime professor at Rockefeller University.

== Early life and education ==
Jules Hirsch as born in New York City on April 6, 1927, to parents who had immigrated from Eastern Europe. He was raised in Asbury Park, New Jersey, where his father was a shopkeeper. As an undergraduate at Rutgers University, Hirsch was rejected from multiple medical schools due to restrictions at many institutions on the number of Jewish students. He was finally accepted at the University of Texas Southwestern Medical Center, and completed his medical degree in 1948, followed by an internship at Duke University Hospital, and residency at the SUNY Upstate Medical Center. He worked for two years in the US Public Health Service.

== Research career ==
In 1954, Hirsch moved to Rockefeller University as an assistant physician. Along with Edward H. Ahrens, Jr., Hirsch developed techniques for measuring fats in the blood and body tissues. Throughout his career, Hirsch's work focused on how eating choices, energy expenditure, and the biochemistry of fat cells influenced obesity. In the 1960s, Hirsch compared fat cells from obese and non-obese people, finding weight loss decreased the size but not number of individual fat cells.

From 1992 to 1996, Hirsch served as Rockefeller University's Physician-in-Chief.

== Personal life ==
Hirsch was twice married. His second wife, psychoanalyst Helen Davidoff, died in 2010. Hirsch had two sons, David and Joshua.

== Death ==
Hirsch died on July 23, 2015. He willed $244,587 to the University of Texas Southwestern Medical School "in gratitude to the students and teachers of the class of 1948 who introduced me to the profession of medicine."
