= Ira Alterman =

American journalist and author

Ira Alterman (4 July 1945 – 6 July 2015) was an American journalist and author, particularly of illustrated novelty books.

Ira Alterman was born on 4 July 1945.

Alterman wrote for Boston After Dark, which later became The Boston Phoenix.

He was married to Carolyn Windle, and they had two children, Daniel and Sara. Sara would later become an author and helped Alterman write his final books following an Alzheimer's diagnosis.

Ira Alterman died on 6 July 2015.

== Selected publications ==
- Games You Can Play with Your Pussy
- Picking Up Girls
- Computer Weak
- The Official Irish Sex Manual
- Computing for Profits
- Dog Child - The Big Dog Book
- The Naughty Bride
- Do Diapers Give You Leprosy? What Every Parent Should Know About Bringing Up Babies
- Sex Manual for People over Thirty
- Gourmet Dinners for the Canine Connoisseur
- Games for the John
- The Wedding Night
- How To Pick Up Men
- How To Pick Up Girls
- So, You've Got a Fat Pussy!
- Baby's First Year
- Games You Can't Lose
- Games You Can't Win
- Our Aim Is To Keep This Bathroom Clean: Your Aim Will Help
- Official Pro Football Handbook
- You Little Stinker
- Life's A Picnic If You Have A Big Weenie
