= Rafael Navarro (painter) =

Spanish painter and sculptor

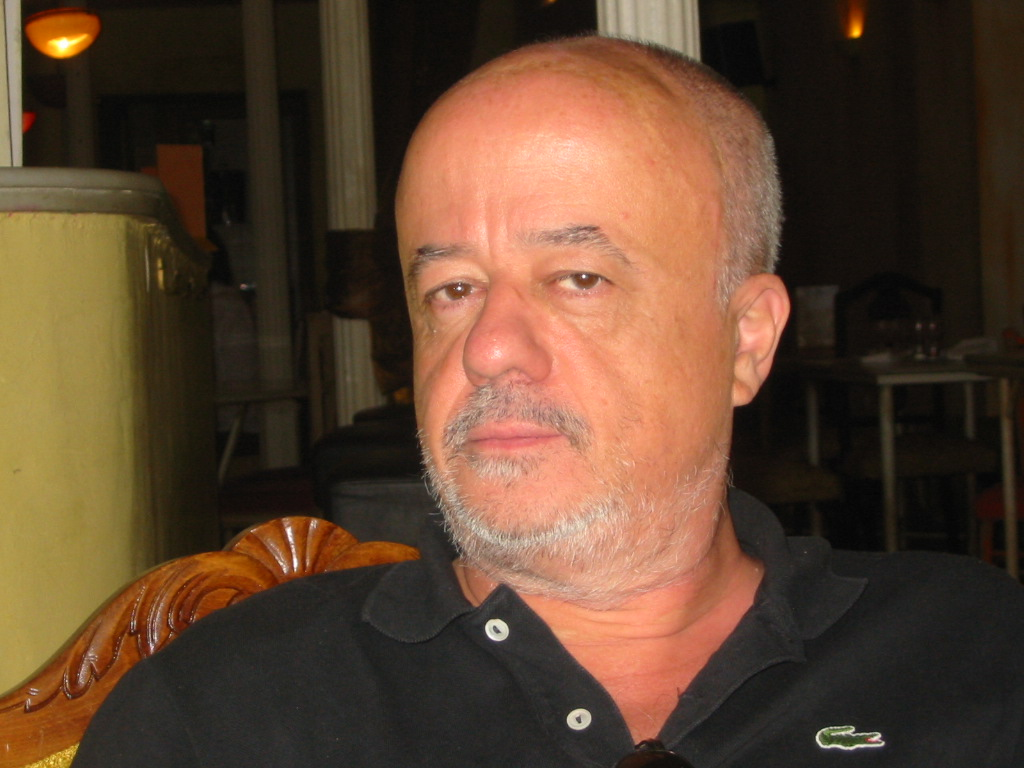
- Born: 10 February 1946; Córdoba, Spain
- Died: 27 July 2015 (aged 69); Córdoba, Spain
- Known for: Painter
- Movement: Surrealism

Rafael Navarro Núñez (February 10, 1946 – July 27, 2015) was a Spanish painter.

== Biography ==
Nuñez studied at la Escuela de Artes Aplicadas y Oficios Artísticos de Córdoba (the Córdoba School of Arts and Crafts), and in 1968 began advanced studies in the Santa Isabel of Hungary School of Fine Arts in Seville. In 1970, he joined the Saint Fernando School of Fine Arts of Madrid, where he spent three years dedicated to painting, silkscreen printing, mural art, the xylography and chalcography. At the same time, he undertook four courses in Drawing in the Círculo de Bellas Artes in Madrid.

From 1980 to 1986, Nuñez served as professor at the Córdoba School of Arts and Crafts, eventually leaving to devote himself entirely to painting.

He died in 2015.

== Career ==
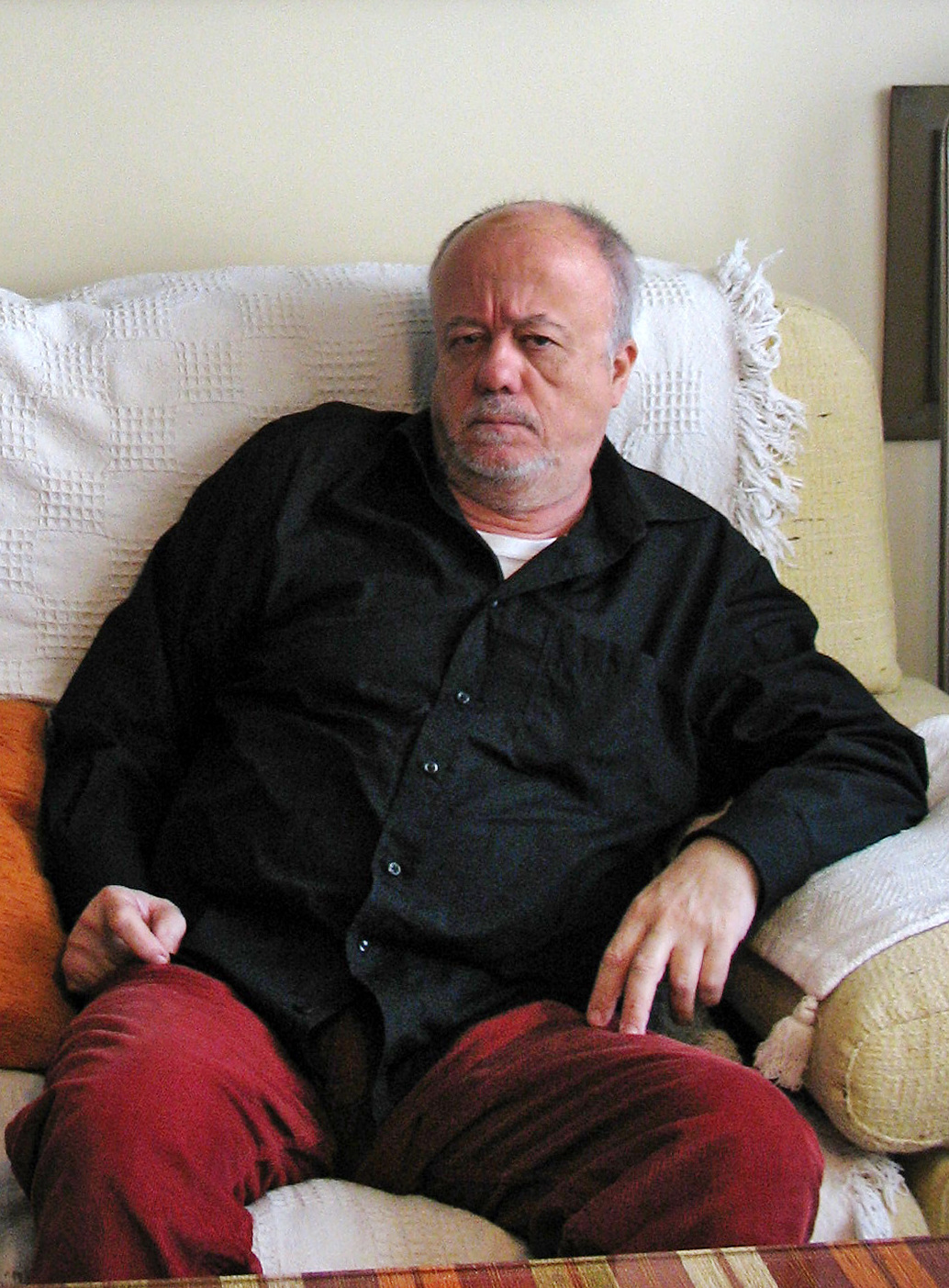
Rafael Navarro (2009)

His first individual exhibition was at the Madrilenian Gallery Novart in 1978. More than thirty individual exhibitions followed as well as other collective exhibitions.

Navarro liked to classify his work as expressionist, somewhere between the Spanish "figuración" and abstract. Madrid, where he spent ten years training, has always been a clear influence, especially in his grandmasters projects Goya (the Goya of the Black Paintings) as well as painters Francis Bacon and Antonio Saura.

He participated in the collective sample, "60 Years of Contemporary Art", in Córdoba (1953–2013) which was celebrated in four headquarters at the same time in December 2014.

=== Kassel exhibition ===
In October 2012, he prepared a sample of his works, a magna exhibition with more than 130 works that covered more than 30 years of his work. Organized by Michael Wilkens, architect and chair of Theory of the Architecture of the University of Kassel and founder of the group Baufrösche (Ranitas constructors), Navarro exhibited in the Atelier of Langestrasse (Kassel, Germany) a group of works that were painted from 1980 to 2012. The exhibition displayed one of Navarro's last series, titled Nosferatu, in addition to the series Matador and Toxic Landscape, painted between 2004 and 2010. Eighteen pictures were added to the exhibition from the collector and commissioner of the exhibition, Alfonso Rodríguez, who contributed works between 1984 and 2004.

== Exhibitions ==
Stand-out individual exhibitions:

- Gallery Arlanzón, C.A.m. (Boroughs, 1979);
- Gallery Lawns (Córdoba, 1979);
- Gallery Studio 52 (Córdoba, 1982);
- Gallery Harras (Málaga, 1983);
- Gallery Arc-in-Ciel (Córdoba, 1983);
- Room Mateo Inurria (Córdoba, 1983 and 1987);
- Gallery Melchor (Seville, 1984).
- Provincial box of Savings (Granada, 1984);
- School of Architects (Córdoba, 1986);
- Palace of the Favour (Córdoba, 1988);
- Room of Exhibitions Box of Salamanca (itinerant by Palencia, Valladolid, Zamora and Ávila, 1988);
- Room of Exhibitions Box of Savings of Asturias (itinerant by Gijón, Avilés, Mieres and The Felguera, Oviedo, 1989);
- Gallery Velázquez (Valladolid, 1990);
- Room of Exhibitions Postal Box of Savings (itinerant by Cádiz and Jerez of the Border, Cádiz, 1990);
- Gallery Of the Ship (Seville, 1993);
- Palace of Viana (Córdoba, 1994); Gallery Open Window (Seville, 1999);
- Palace of the Favour (Córdoba, 2001);
- Room of Exhibitions The Pergola (Córdoba, 2003);
- Galeria Art 21. (Córdoba, 2006) and Atelier of Langestrasse (Kassel, Germany, 2012).
