= Nazier Dindar =

South African cricketer (1966–2015)

Personal information
- Born: 12 February 1966; Lenasia, South Africa
- Died: 6 July 2015 (aged 49); Riyadh, Saudi Arabia
- Source: Cricinfo, 25 March 2016

Nazier Dindar (12 February 1966 – 6 July 2015) was a South African cricketer. He played 31 first-class matches for Transvaal between 1983 and 1992.
