= Bent Rolstad =

Norwegian professor of medicine

Bent Rolstad (13 March 1947 – 9 July 2015) was a Norwegian professor of medicine.

He took the cand.med. degree at the University of Oslo in 1975, the dr.med. degree in 1977, specializing in anatomy, and became a professor at the Institute of Basic Medical Sciences there. He was a fellow of the Norwegian Academy of Science and Letters. He resided in Asker. He died while vacationing in Spain in the summer of 2015.
