= Robert Rapson (American football) =

American football player and coach (1935–2015)

Biographical details
- Born: July 3, 1935; Bad Axe, Michigan
- Died: July 14, 2015 (aged 80); Chattanooga, Tennessee
- Education: Taylor University

Coaching career (HC unless noted)
- 1974–1978: Maranatha Baptist Bible

Head coaching record
- Overall: 19–19–1

Accomplishments and honors

Championships
- 2 UMAC (1975, 1976)

Robert Melvin Rapson (August 3, 1935 – July 14, 2015) was an American college football coach. He was the head coach of Maranatha Baptist Bible College in Watertown, Wisconsin from 1974 to 1978, compiling a record of 19–19–1 and winning two conference championships.

Rapson played college football at Taylor University, earning varsity letters in 1957 and 1958.

== Head coaching record ==
| Year | Team | Overall | Conference | Standing | Bowl/playoffs |
|---|---|---|---|---|---|
Maranatha Baptist Bible Crusaders (Upper Midwest Athletic Conference) (1974–1978)
| 1974 | Maranatha Baptist | 3–3 | | | |
| 1975 | Maranatha Baptist | 6–1 | | | |
| 1976 | Maranatha Baptist | 3–5–1 | | | |
| 1977 | Maranatha Baptist | 6–2–1 | | | |
| 1978 | Maranatha Baptist | 1–8 | | | |
| Maranatha Baptist: | | 19–19–1 | | | |
| Total: | | 19–19–1 | | | |
National championship Conference title Conference division title or championship game berth
