= Hisato Aikura =

Japanese music critic (1931–2015)

Hisato Aikura (相倉久人, 8 December 1931 in Tokyo – 8 July 2015) was a Japanese music critic and jazz presenter. He was known for critique of musicians such as John Coltrane.

== Career ==
Aikura was born on 8 December 1930 in present-day Ōta, Tokyo. Throughout childhood into his teenage years, he attended an Imperial Japanese Military Childhood School, with World War II ending during his enrollment. One of his classmates was novelist Kyotaro Nishimura.

While a student at the University of Tokyo, he began frequenting local jazz group lounges and writing jazz criticism, debuting in Music Life journal. He would later drop out and in 1959 begin regularly writing for Swing Journal, a monthly music magazine specializing in jazz. He would regularly quarrel throughout 1962 and 1963 with his peer in the same journal Jirou Kubota over writing styles. In 1967 he would break away from Swing Journal after the publication indirectly defamed him while criticizing sax musician Kazunori Takeda, going on to work with and form stronger bonds other publications and groups while forming some of his own.

In 1970, he decided that "jazz" as he had defined it was dead, and retired from jazz criticism, moving on to rock and film critique throughout the following decades. He would however in his later years resume jazz criticism, and would lecture at Japan Journalist Technical School in Toshima.
