= Dick van Bekkum =

Dutch physician and university professor

Dirk Willem "Dick" van Bekkum (30 July 1925 – 17 July 2015) was a Dutch medical-radiobiologist. Van Bekkum was founder and head of the Radiobiological Institute of the Netherlands Organisation for Applied Scientific Research for thirty years. At Leiden University he was professor of experimental transplantation biology and at the Erasmus University Rotterdam he was professor of radiobiology. In the late 1960s he was one of the first to perform bone marrow transplants.

== Career ==
Van Bekkum was born on Batavia, Dutch East Indies. In 1952 he obtained his PhD cum laude under Andries Querido at Leiden University.

In 1969 Van Bekkum was cofounder of the Stichting Biowetenschappen en Maatschappij together with Prince Claus of the Netherlands, Van Bekkum chaired the organisation for several years.

In 1973 Van Bekkum became member of the Royal Netherlands Academy of Arts and Sciences.

After retiring from academic work at the University Van Bekkum became involved in stem cell research and later gene therapy. As he could not obtain enough funds he became one of the founders of IntroGene which later became part of Crucell. At age 85 he started the pharmaceutical foundation Cinderella Therapeutics together with Huib Vriesendorp.

In 2006 in a list of possible Dutch winners of a Nobel Prize in Physiology or Medicine compiled by the Dutch Journal of Medicine Van Bekkum was named several times.

In 2009 he received the Van Walree Prize of the Royal Netherlands Academy of Arts and Sciences, together with Arend Jan Dunning. The prize is intended for scientists who have made medical research available for a wide audience. Van Bekkum received the prize for his whole career. He died on 17 July 2015, aged 89.
