= 1993 in Australian television =

== Events ==
- 4 January – Australian long-running children's series Mr. Squiggle returns to the ABC for a brand new series. The approximate running time is 5 minutes.
- 11 January – The Australian version of the hit game show series Jeopardy! hosted by ex-Sale of the Century host Tony Barber begins a brief run on Network Ten.
- 1 February – The Morning Show, rebranding its name to Good Morning Australia (as GMA with Bert Newton) after the original title name for the previous breakfast show started in 1981 ended. The Morning Show was the future title of a morning programme which made its debut 14 years later.
- 3 February – In Neighbours, this was Toby Mangel, Dorothy Burke and Bouncer's last episode together.
- 5 February – Australian travel magazine series The Great Outdoors begins on Seven Network.
- 7 February – The ABC launches its first foray into early-morning news and current affairs with a brand new programme called First Edition presented by Kate Dunstan and Doug Weller.
- 11 February – In Neighbours, Bouncer returns; Philip Martin has a flashback to Loretta Martin's death.
- 13 February – Hey Hey It's Saturday and Foreign Correspondent return for another year. At 22, Jo Beth Taylor becomes the youngest television presenter to host a prime-time program as she starts hosting Australia's Funniest Home Video Show for a four-year run.
- 16 February – ABC transmits a television movie Joh's Jury which follows the perjury trial of Sir Joh Bjelke-Petersen (portrayed by comedian Gerry Connolly).
- 1 March – Prime Television broadcasts a brand new 6:00 pm news and current affairs programme called Prime 6 O'Clock News.
- 3 March – The Birthday Cake Interview takes place. This is seen as a crucial factor in the surprise re-election of the ALP in the federal election.
- 8 March – ABC begins having a 24-hour transmission for the second time, following the launch of the broadcaster's music block rage in April 1987.
- 8 March – British long running science fiction series Doctor Who returns to the ABC after a very long absence since its last air in January 1992. Now airing weekday mornings at 4:30 am, the series will start with the first serial of Season 19 Castrovalva and will continue until 3 March 1994 with the fourth and final part of the sixth and final serial of Season 22 Revelation of the Daleks.
- 15 March – Ten News Perth presenter Rachel McNally quits after a pay dispute and is replaced by Mikayla Turner.
- 19 March – TV Week Logie Awards hosted by Bert Newton for the 18th time airs on Network Ten. Ray Martin wins the Gold Logie for the first time since 1987.
- 22 March – Simon Townsend presents a brand new program on ABC called TVTV. Townsend is also joined by James Valentine, Edith Bliss, John Hanrahan, Julia Gardiner and Sueyan Cox and the series will be about television reviews or topics plus a segment called TV News which includes news on television and Townsend interviewing celebrities including a producer or a television star.
- 29 March – Michael Tunn narrates a series of two half-hour documentary television specials created for The Afternoon Show called Bodybeat which talks about teenagers and body issues. The first part will be about girls and the second part will be about boys. The specials will air on ABC at 5:30 pm and will be shown on The Afternoon Show which Tunn also hosted.
- 30 March – Mike Willesee comes under scrutiny for interviewing the two children held hostage during the 1993 Cangai siege.
- 31 March – The long running Australian lifestyle and gardening programme Burke's Backyard begins airing on the BBC in the UK, making it the first time to air the series in that country.
- 29 April – In Neighbours, Jim Robinson dies from a heart attack. The last ever of the original 1985 cast members, Alan Dale departs the series. Anne Haddy becomes the last original cast member in Neighbours 8-year history. Jim Robinson is the next character to be killed off the show following the past deaths of characters Daphne Clarke (Elaine Smith, 1988), Kerry Bishop (Linda Hartley, 1990), Harold Bishop (Ian Smith, 1991) and Todd Landers (Kristian Schmid, 1992) being terminated and written out.
- 19 May – In Neighbours, it was Brad Willis and Beth Brennan's non-Wedding.
- 20 May – In Neighbours, Michael Martin is finally arrested, and is sent to jail. The final episode of E Street airs on Ten.
- 24 May – Australian teen music game show Vidiot presented by Eden Gaha returns for a brand new series on ABC.
- 24 May – Australian children's television series Simon Townsend's Wonder World is relaunched on Nine Network with new reporters and having the title shortened to just Wonder World!.
- 31 May – A new drama series Paradise Beach begins on the Nine Network.
- 31 May – NSWRL State of Origin. Queensland vs. NSW games were broadcast on Nine Network.
- 23 June – A brand new Australian factual program Money starts on Nine Network.
- 27 June – Jo Beth Taylor gets slimmed at the end of the grand final on Australia's Funniest Home Video Show.
- 27 June – French-American-Canadian animated series Inspector Gadget airs on ABC for the very last time after airing on the public broadcaster for eight years since debuting in 1984. It will return to Australian free for air television on 9 June 1997 with the series airing on Network Ten.
- 5 July – British comedy series Absolutely Fabulous debuts on ABC.
- 5 July – American animated series The Ren and Stimpy Show premieres on Network Ten. It was also the very first Nicktoon to air in Australia.
- 7 July - The Seven Network news program Eleven AM reaches its 4000th edition.
- 17 July – Australian sitcom Eggshells returns to television with a second season on ABC.
- 19 July – TVNZ picks up Nine's already new drama series Paradise Beach to air on TV One in New Zealand.
- 31 July – Nine Network premieres a new children's Saturday morning cartoon wrapper programme called What's Up Doc?. Presented by Danielle Fairclough, the programme features Warner Bros. based cartoons including old classic Looney Tunes and Merrie Melodies cartoons and television series such as reruns of The Bugs Bunny Show, The Porky Pig Show, the fourth season of Beetlejuice and the Australian premiere of Batman: The Animated Series.
- 13 August – Jo Bailey quits Sale of the Century. Every week, female celebrities replace Bailey until the end on 1993 when a replacement is yet to be announced.
- 23 August – Australian news program World Watch begins its first screening on SBS. This series carries news bulletins from countries all around the world and gives viewers the opportunity to see news bulletins in their native language.
- 30 August – A new late night sports round-up program Sports Tonight premieres on Network Ten.
- 4 September – ABC airs the final episode of the Australian sitcom Eggshells.
- 9 September – American sitcom Seinfeld debuts on the Nine Network.
- 5 September – All Australian television networks retire the 'PGR', and 'AO' classifications and replaces them with 'G', 'PG', 'M15+', 'MA15+', and 'AV15+' ('G' was already in use prior to the change, but would now be seen in its trademark triangle instead of a square/circle).
- 12 September – The ABC television movie Joh's Jury is broadcast in New Zealand on TV One as part of the channel's movie block Montana Sunday Theatre.
- 20 September – Australian early morning news program First Edition returns with a revamped format presented by Tony Eastley.
- 30 October – Australian comedy series The Late Show airs its final episode on ABC.
- 1 November – Nine Network debuts a new Australian comedy drama series for children called Ship to Shore.
- 22 November – A Country Practice airs on Seven Network for the last time. It will soon be picked by Network Ten for a brief run in 1994.
- 25 November – Ray Martin presents his final episode of Midday. He moves on to A Current Affair effective from 1994 and is replaced in the Midday role by Derryn Hinch. As a result, Hinch moves from Melbourne to Sydney.
- 26 November – Final episode of Australian comedy chat show Tonight Live with Steve Vizard is broadcast on Seven Network.
- 1 December – The Seven Network wins the ratings year for the fifth consecutive year in primetime, with a 34.9% share for Total People. The most watched program was Seven's AFL: 1993 AFL Grand Final.
- 7 December – American sitcom Seinfeld switches over to airing on Network Ten following bad ratings on Nine.
- 13 December - Game Show The Price Is Right (Australian game show) premieres in a new format on the Nine Network with new host Larry Emdur succeeding the late Ian Turpie. The programme debuts in the 7pm timeslot over the summer non-ratings period, and proves successful enough to be given its own 5:30pm timeslot at the commencement of the 1994 ratings year, until 1998.
- 17 December – Australian children's weekday afternoon magazine series The Afternoon Show airs its final episode at 5:00 pm on ABC with repeats of Widget and The Adventures of Tintin which were both animated series. It was also presented by Michael Tunn who will later host a replacement music show for the axed program titled Loud.
- Canwest buys Network Ten from Westpac.
- Neighbours becomes the least watched drama for the fourth year running.

== Debuts ==
Program	Network	Debut date
The Adventures of Blinky Bill	ABC TV	1 January
Swordfish	Network Ten	3 January
Talk to the Animals	Seven Network	31 January
The Great Outdoors	Seven Network	5 February
First Edition	ABC TV	8 February
Joh's Jury	ABC TV	16 February
Newlyweds	Seven Network	20 February
Seven Deadly Sins	ABC TV	23 February
Prime 6 O'Clock News	Prime	1 March
The Extraordinary	Seven Network	4 March
TVTV	ABC TV	22 March
The AFL Sunday Footy Show	Nine Network	28 March
Bodybeat	ABC TV	29 March
This Sporting Life	ABC TV	19 April
Law of the Land	Nine Network	20 April
Full Frontal	Seven Network	13 May
Paradise Beach	Nine Network	31 May
Our House	Nine Network	23 June
Money	Nine Network	23 June
The Comedy Sale	Seven Network	25 July
What's Up Doc?	Nine Network	31 July
At Home	Seven Network	2 August
World Watch	SBS TV	23 August
Sports Tonight	Network Ten	30 August
Snowy	Nine Network	8 September
Secrets	ABC TV	16 September
Debate!	Network Ten	18 September
Totally Wild Weekend	Network Ten	18 September
The Feds	Nine Network	20 September
Ship to Shore	Nine Network	1 November
Mission Top Secret	Network Ten	8 November
In Company with Cruickshank	ABC TV	9 December
House of Fun	Network Ten	19 December
Kideo	ABC TV	26 December
The NRL Sunday Footy Show	Nine Network	1993

=== International ===
Program	Network	Debut date
(United Kingdom) Die Kinder	ABC TV	2 January
(Canada) The Global Family	SBS TV	4 January
(Hong Kong) Heaven's Retribution	SBS TV	4 January
(United Kingdom) Matters of Taste	SBS TV	5 January
(Canada) Hoover vs. The Kennedys	Network Ten	5 January
(United Kingdom) A Sense of Guilt	ABC TV	6 January
(Italy) Join the Gang	SBS TV	9 January
(United Kingdom) Dodgem	ABC TV	11 January
(United States) Wild and Crazy Kids	ABC TV	13 January
(United Kingdom) Troublemakers	ABC TV	19 January
(United States) / (United Kingdom) / (Wales) Fantastic Max	ABC TV	25 January
(United States) City	Nine Network	27 January
(United Kingdom) Sweet Seventeen	ABC TV	27 January
(United States) Disney Adventures	Seven Network	1 February
(United States) The Golden Palace	Seven Network	6 February
(United Kingdom) / (United States) Captain Zed and the Zee Zone	Network Ten	7 February
(United States) 2000 Malibu Road	Network Ten	8 February
(United States) Billy	Nine Network	9 February
(United Kingdom) Spider!	ABC TV	11 February
(United States) Melrose Place	Network Ten	12 February
(United Kingdom) / (United States) Diana: Her True Story	Network Ten	21 February
(United Kingdom) Greek Fire	SBS TV	23 February
(United States) Capital News	Nine Network	23 February
(United Kingdom) Mathematical Eye	ABC TV	24 February
(United Kingdom) Bump	ABC TV	1 March
(United Kingdom) Terry and Julian	ABC TV	8 March
(United States) The Jacksons: An American Dream	Network Ten	15 March
(United Kingdom) Redemption Song	SBS TV	15 March
(United Kingdom) The Borrowers	ABC TV	20 March
(Denmark) Hotel Amore	SBS TV	22 March
(United States) The Mechanical Universe	ABC TV	29 March
(United Kingdom) Pole to Pole	ABC TV	4 April
(France) / (Canada) The Adventures of Tintin	ABC TV	5 April
(United Kingdom) Toucan Tecs	ABC TV	12 April
(United States) Dark Justice	Seven Network	13 April
(United States) Palace Guard	Nine Network	15 April
(Canada) Degrassi Talks	ABC TV	19 April
(Canada) The Girl from Mars	ABC TV	19 April
(United States) Dr. Quinn, Medicine Woman	Nine Network	22 April
(United Kingdom) The World of Peter Rabbit and Friends	ABC TV	1 May
(United States) P.S. I Luv U	Nine Network	8 May
(United Kingdom) The Old Devils	ABC TV	9 May
(United States) Parenthood	Network Ten	10 May
(United States) Back to the Future: The Animated Series	Network Ten	13 May
(United Kingdom) Mr. Bean in Room 426	ABC TV	14 May
(United Kingdom) Mind the Baby, Mr. Bean	ABC TV	21 May
(Canada) School's Out	ABC TV	21 May
(United Kingdom) Time Riders	ABC TV	22 May
(United Kingdom) Noddy's Toyland Adventures	ABC TV	26 May
(United Kingdom) Children of the North	ABC TV	30 May
(United States) Freshman Dorm	Seven Network	31 May
(United States) Cartoons for Big Kids	ABC TV	9 June
(United States) Picket Fences	Network Ten	10 June
(United Kingdom) Heartbeat	ABC TV	13 June
(United Kingdom) Oh, Mr. Toad	ABC TV	14 June
(United States) Hearts Are Wild	Seven Network	17 June
(United States) Code 3 (1992)	Network Ten	23 June
(United Kingdom) Clarissa	ABC TV	27 June
(United States) Love & War	Nine Network	28 June
(United Kingdom) Absolutely Fabulous	ABC TV	5 July
(United States) The Ren and Stimpy Show	Network Ten	5 July
(United States) Cutters	Seven Network	5 July
(United States) / (Canada) Fievel's American Tails	Network Ten	6 July
(United Kingdom) Merry Christmas, Mr. Bean	ABC TV	9 July
(United States) Teech	Nine Network	11 July
(United Kingdom) The Hypnotic World of Paul McKenna	Seven Network	15 July
(United Kingdom) 2 point 4 Children	ABC TV	16 July
(United Kingdom) The Face of Tutankhamun	ABC TV	18 July
(United States) Civil Wars	Network Ten	20 July
(United States) Capitol Critters	Network Ten	23 July
(United Kingdom) Witchcraft	ABC TV	25 July
(United States) Law & Order	Network Ten	27 July
(United States) Batman: The Animated Series	Nine Network	31 July
(United States) The Edge	Nine Network	2 August
(United Kingdom) The Essential History of Europe	SBS TV	3 August
(United States) / (Canada) Sirens	Nine Network	3 August
(Wales) Joshua Jones	ABC TV	4 August
(Canada) Mission Reading	ABC TV	9 August
(United Kingdom) KYTV	SBS TV	10 August
(United States) The New Untouchables	Seven Network	10 August
(United Kingdom) / (Australia) Stark	ABC TV	11 August
(United States) Delta	Network Ten	14 August
(United States) FBI: The Untold Stories	Network Ten	18 August
(Canada) The Boys of St. Vincent	Network Ten	22 August
(United Kingdom) Lipstick on Your Collar	ABC TV	22 August
(United Kingdom) / (Canada) Rupert	ABC TV	23 August
(United Kingdom) The Piglet Files	Seven Network	24 August
(United States) Transformers: Generation 2	Network Ten	25 August
(United Kingdom) Roots Schmoots: A Journey by Howard Jacobson	SBS TV	29 August
(United Kingdom) Far Flung Floyd	SBS TV	3 September
(United States) Taz-Mania	Nine Network	4 September
(United States) Woops!	Seven Network	6 September
(United States) Seinfeld	Nine Network	9 September
(United Kingdom) Freddie and Max	ABC TV	8 September
(United Kingdom) One Foot in the Grave	ABC TV	11 September
(United States) Dancing	ABC TV	12 September
(United States) The Baby-Sitters Club	ABC TV	13 September
(United Kingdom) A Year in Provence	ABC TV	13 September
(United States) Room for Two	Nine Network	16 September
(United Kingdom) Bad Boyes	ABC TV	27 September
(France) / (Canada) / (United States) Madeline (TV specials)	ABC TV	28 September
(United States) Hearts Afire	Network Ten	30 September
(United Kingdom) Celts	SBS TV	3 October
(United Kingdom) Look At It This Way	ABC TV	3 October
(United States) / (Japan) The Adventures of T-Rex	Network Ten	4 October
(United States) Lamb Chop's Play Along	Seven Network	4 October
(United States) X-Men	Network Ten	5 October
(United States) Drexell's Class	Network Ten	5 October
(United States) Nonsense and Lullabyes	ABC TV	6 October
(United Kingdom) Truckers	ABC TV	6 October
(United Kingdom) Brum	ABC TV	6 October
(United States) The Marzipan Pig	ABC TV	8 October
(United States) Ghostwriter	ABC TV	10 October
(United States) American Dreamer	Seven Network	11 October
(United States) Eerie, Indiana	Seven Network	19 October
(United Kingdom) Streetwise	ABC TV	20 October
(United Kingdom) Framed	ABC TV	22 October
(United States) / (France) Bucky O'Hare and the Toad Wars	Network Ten	22 October
(United Kingdom) Tell Tale Hearts	ABC TV	24 October
(Wales) Pirates	SBS TV	26 October
(India) The Darkness	SBS TV	27 October
(United Kingdom) The Gravy Train	ABC TV	31 October
(Germany) Fast Gerdi	SBS TV	2 November
(United Kingdom) The Law Lord	ABC TV	6 November
(United States) Roc	Nine Network	17 November
(United Kingdom) G.B.H.	ABC TV	23 November
(United Kingdom) The Gravy Train Goes East	ABC TV	28 November
(United States) Blossom	Seven Network	29 November
(United States) Reasonable Doubts	Seven Network	30 November
(United States) South Beach	Network Ten	1 December
(United States) / (Canada) Dog City	Network Ten	1 December
(United Kingdom) Boys from the Bush	Seven Network	2 December
(United States) Hangin' with Mr. Cooper	Seven Network	2 December
(United Kingdom) Casualty	Network Ten	4 December
(United Kingdom) Men Behaving Badly	ABC TV	6 December
(United Kingdom) Maigret	Seven Network	6 December
(United States) Top of the Heap	Nine Network	13 December
(United States) Vinnie and Bobby	Nine Network	22 December
(United States) Silk Stalkings	Nine Network	23 December
(United Kingdom) Postman Pat Takes the Bus	ABC TV	23 December
(United States) A Flintstone Family Christmas	Seven Network	24 December
(United Kingdom) Postman Pat and the Toy Soldiers	ABC TV	24 December
(United Kingdom) On Christmas Eve	ABC TV	25 December
(United States) Winnie the Pooh and Christmas Too	Seven Network	25 December
(United Kingdom) Old Bear Stories (Jolly Snow/Dolls House Christmas)	ABC TV	25 December
(United Kingdom) / (Wales) Santa's First Christmas	ABC TV	25 December
(United Kingdom) Root Into Europe	ABC TV	26 December
(United Kingdom) / (Russia) / (Wales) Shakespeare: The Animated Tales	SBS TV	27 December
(United States) Space Rangers	Nine Network	28 December
(United Kingdom) Madness	ABC TV	30 December
(United States) Goof Troop	Seven Network	1993
(United States) Disney's The Little Mermaid	Seven Network	1993
(United States) The New Lassie	Network Ten	1993
(United States) Casper and Friends	Network Ten	1993

== Changes to network affiliation ==
This is a list of programs which made their premiere on an Australian television network that had previously premiered on another Australian television network. The networks involved in the switch of allegiances are predominantly both free-to-air networks or both subscription television networks. Programs that have their free-to-air/subscription television premiere, after previously premiering on the opposite platform (free-to air to subscription/subscription to free-to air) are not included. In some cases, programs may still air on the original television network. This occurs predominantly with programs shared between subscription television networks.

=== Domestic ===
Program	New network(s)	Previous network(s)	Date
Round the Twist	ABC TV	Seven Network	20 March

=== International ===
Program	New network(s)	Previous network(s)	Date
(United Kingdom) It Ain't Half Hot Mum	Network Ten	ABC TV; Seven Network	22 July
(United States) Dungeons & Dragons	Network Ten	Seven Network	29 November
(United States) Seinfeld	Network Ten	Nine Network	7 December

== Television shows ==
ABC

- Mr. Squiggle and Friends (1959–1999)
- Four Corners (1961–present)
- Rage (1987–present)
- G.P. (1989–1996)
- Foreign Correspondent (1992–present)
- The Late Show (1992–1993)
- Vidiot (1992–1995)
- Stark (1993)

Seven Network

- Wheel of Fortune (1981–1996, 1996–2003, 2004–06)
- A Country Practice (1981–1994)
- Home and Away (1988–present)
- Family Feud (1988–1996)
- Real Life (1992–1994)

Nine Network

- Sunday (1981–2008)
- Today (1982 – present)
- Sale of the Century (1980–2001)
- A Current Affair (1971–1978, 1988–present)
- The Midday Show (1973–1998)
- 60 Minutes (1979–present)
- The Flying Doctors (1986–1991)
- Australia's Funniest Home Video Show (1990–2000, 2000–2004, 2005–2014)
- Hey Hey It's Saturday (1971–1999, 2009–2010)
- Getaway (1992–present)

Network Ten

- Neighbours (1985–2022)
- E Street (1989–1993)
- Good Morning Australia with Bert Newton (1991–2005)
- Sports Tonight (1993–2011)

== Ending this year ==
Date	Show	Channel	Debut
16 January	Bingles	Channel Ten	1992
26 February	Big Square Eye	ABC	1991
25 March	Seven Deadly Sins	ABC	23 February 1993
5 April	Bodybeat	ABC	29 March 1993
20 May	E Street	Channel Ten	1989
3 June	Phoenix	ABC	1992
10 July	Kids' Stuff	Network Ten	1991
12 August	Stark	ABC	11 August 1993
4 September	Eggshells	ABC	1991
14 September	All Together Now	Channel Nine	1991
30 October	The Late Show	ABC	1992
11 November	Snowy	Channel Nine	8 September 1993
22 November	A Country Practice	Seven Network	1981
26 November	Tonight Live with Steve Vizard	Channel Seven	1990
17 December	The Afternoon Show	ABC	1987

== Returning this year ==
Date	Show	Channel	Debut
24 May	Simon Townsend's Wonder World	Nine Network	1979
13 December	The Price Is Right	Nine Network	1981

== See also ==
- 1993 in Australia
- List of Australian films of 1993
