= 1992 in Australian television =

== Events ==
- 1 January – The Victorian television market is aggregated, with VIC TV (now WIN Television) becoming the Nine Network affiliate, Prime Television taking a Seven Network affiliation & Southern Cross Network (now Southern Cross Ten) taking the Network Ten affiliation.
- 3 January – The long-running British science fiction series Doctor Who airs its finale broadcast on ABC with the fourth and final part of the seventh and final serial of Season 18, Logopolis. For the rest of 1992 there were no more broadcasts of Doctor Who. In March 1993 the first serial of Season 19, Castrovalva, was broadcast. The show would finish airing on 3 March 1994.
- 6 January – Neighbours and Home and Away return for 1992 now both screening against each other in the 7pm timeslot.
- 20 January – Network Ten launches weeknight "First at Five" news on its five capital city stations.
- 20 January – Bert Newton returns to television as host of a new talk show on Network Ten The Morning Show.
- 20 January – Former ABC reporter Stan Grant presents a new nightly current affairs program called Real Life on Seven Network.
- 27 January – Australian evening current affairs program The 7.30 Report returns to ABC for the new year.
- 3 February – Ex-Europe Correspondent Ian Henderson takes over as newsreader for the 7.00 pm ABC News in Victoria after Mary Delahunty left to replace John Jost for the Victoria Edition of The 7.30 Report.
- 3 February – Australian pioneering lifestyle program Healthy, Wealthy and Wise makes its debut and begins a seven-year run on Network Ten.
- 8 February – Network Ten's troubled soap opera Neighbours is another attempt to bring back to its former 1980s ratings glory, producers are ramping up the show's storylines as well as writing out four cast members while signing up three new faces. Lorraine Bayly, Jeremy Angerson, Andrew Williams and Gillian Blakeney being terminated and are all leaving the show in coming weeks – while Ben Mitchell and Felice Arena are joining the series, and former guest star and future recording artist Natalie Imbruglia is returning for an ongoing role. Producer Don Battye is confident of re-signing Melissa Bell (the current Lucy Robinson) when her contract expires mid-year, despite moves to have her swap over to Ten's other evening soap, E Street. Veteran actor Tom Oliver has been re-signed with Neighbours, with plans to romantically match up his character Lou Carpenter to now-widowed Madge Bishop (Anne Charleston). Producers are also casting for two teenagers to enter the series as Carpenter's children. Another romantic storyline being devised by writers is set to involve Lucy (Melissa Bell) and Brad Willis (Scott Michaelson).
- 9 February – Three of Nine Network's current affairs lineup programmes 60 Minutes, Sunday and Business Sunday return for another year.
- 9 February – French-American-Canadian animated series Inspector Gadget airs on ABC as a stand-alone for the very last time. The series will continue airing on Sunday mornings when it returns to air as part of the Sunday morning wrapper programme Couch Potato on 22 March.
- 10 February – Australian comedy series Mother and Son returns for a new series on ABC.
- 10 February – The Nine Network launches a new game show called Supermarket Sweep presented by Ian Turpie, making his last game show appearance before his passing in 2012.
- 12 February – American sitcom Home Improvement based on the stand-up comedy of Tim Allen debuts on Seven Network.
- 13 February – Simon Westaway, Paul Sonkkila, Ben Steel, David Bradshaw and Sean Scully star in a brand new Australian police drama series Phoenix on ABC.
- 14 February – Australian gardening and lifestyle series Burke's Backyard returns for another year. This time host Don Burke is joined by presenters Dr. Harry Cooper, Peter Harris and Densey Clyne.
- 15 February – Australian five minute cooking program Consuming Passions hosted by British chef Ian Parmenter premieres on the ABC.
- 22 February – Australian gardening and lifestyle series Burke's Backyard begins airing in New Zealand on TV One.
- 1 March - The Nine Network revamps it's on air presentation and launches the famous "Skyscraper" ident
- 3 March - Nine's adult drama series, Chances, launches on British satellite channel, Sky One, airing Wednesday and Thursday at 9pm.
- 14 March – Australian documentary series Foreign Correspondent debuts on the ABC.
- 20 March – The Nine Network takes over the Rugby League TV rights from Network Ten, which they continue to broadcast to the present day.
- 30 April – Series final of the Australian police drama series Phoenix airs on ABC.
- 6 April - Network Ten's evening soap opera, E Street, launches in the UK on the Sky One satellite channel. It airs in a half-hour format, 6.30pm, Monday to Friday, starting with episode 43.
- 4 May – Australian children's TV series Skippy the Bush Kangaroo returns to Australian television screens with a short-lived reboot called The Adventures of Skippy. This series focused on Sonny Hammond who is now an adult having followed in his father's footsteps by becoming a ranger at a wildlife park and having his own family and Skippy as a pet kangaroo.
- 8 May – Australian children's educational TV series Lift Off debuts on ABC at 2:00 pm every Friday. It later aired weekdays at 4:30 pm on 29 June and on Saturdays at 6:00 pm on 19 September.
- 14 May – A new Australian travel and lifestyle television program Getaway begins its first screening on Nine Network becoming one of the longest running series on Australian television.
- 18 May – Australian soap opera Neighbours debuts a new set of opening titles and a new theme song performed by Greg Hind.
- 8 June – Australian teen game show Vidiot presented by Eden Gaha debuts on ABC.
- 13 July - Teenager Todd Landers (Kristian Schimid) is killed by an oncoming van in his final episode of Neighbours.
- 18 July – Australian comedy series The Late Show starring The D-Generation starts airing on the ABC running for two seasons.
- 20 July – ABC debuts children's TV series Bananas in Pyjamas.
- 3 September – Kerry Packer and the Nine Network pull the plug on Australia's Naughtiest Home Videos midway through the show.
- 6 November – Final episode of the Australian children's game show Big Square Eye airs on the ABC. The series will be shown one last time the next year at 6:00 pm.
- 26 November – Accident-prone comedy sketch show Fast forward airs its final episode on Seven Network. It returns in 1993 with the rebranded name Full Frontal, which is the same as FF. Fast Forward continued specials in 1993 and 1994.
- 21 December – Network Ten debuts a new weekday morning program for children called The Big Breakfast.
- 22 December – Seven Network airs the 1992 Midori Australian Dancesport Championships at 9:30 pm.

== Debuts ==
| Program | Channel | Debut date |
|---|---|---|
| Real Life | Seven Network | 20 January |
| The Morning Show | Network Ten | 20 January |
| The Fremantle Conspiracy | Seven Network | 26 January |
| Healthy, Wealthy and Wise | Network Ten | 3 February |
| The World at Noon | ABC TV | 3 February |
| Supermarket Sweep | Nine Network | 10 February |
| Phoenix | ABC TV | 13 February |
| Consuming Passions | ABC TV | 15 February |
| Saturday at Rick's | Nine Network | 22 February |
| Order in the House | ABC TV | 29 February |
| Sylvania Waters | ABC TV | 7 March |
| Foreign Correspondent | ABC TV | 14 March |
| Sex | Nine Network | 19 March |
| Friday Night Football | Nine Network | 20 March |
| Sunday Football | Nine Network | 22 March |
| Ferry Boat Fred | ABC TV | 30 March |
| Good Vibrations | Seven Network | 22 April |
| All in a Day's Work | ABC TV | 2 May |
| The Adventures of Skippy | Nine Network | 4 May |
| Lift Off | ABC TV | 8 May |
| Getaway | Nine Network | 14 May |
| A Dog's Life | ABC TV | 29 May |
| Vidiot | ABC TV | 8 June |
| Nightline | Nine Network | 24 June |
| Tracks of Glory | Seven Network | 5 July |
| Totally Wild | Network Ten | 12 July |
| The Late Show | ABC TV | 18 July |
| Bananas in Pyjamas (1992) | ABC TV | 20 July |
| Bony | Seven Network | 15 August |
| Mind Twist | Network Ten | 22 August |
| Australia's Naughtiest Home Videos | Nine Network | 3 September |
| My Two Wives | Nine Network | 8 September |
| Meet the Press | Network Ten | 25 October |
| Bingles | Network Ten | 5 December |
| The Big Breakfast | Network Ten | 21 December |
| Peter Combe's Christmas Under the Stars | ABC TV | 25 December |

=== International programming ===
| Program | Channel | Debut date |
|---|---|---|
| (United States) Dragnet Today | Network Ten | 1 January |
| (United Kingdom) The Secret Cabaret | SBS TV | 2 January |
| (Netherlands) Dr. Krankenstein | SBS TV | 2 January |
| (Australia) / (France) / (United States) Clowning Around | Seven Network | 5 January |
| (United States) Studs | Network Ten | 6 January |
| (United States) Discovering Psychology | SBS TV | 6 January |
| (United States) Hammer, Slammer and Slade | Seven Network | 12 January |
| (Republic of Ireland) The Treaty | ABC TV | 15 January |
| (United States) Mad Scientist | Seven Network | 18 January |
| (New Zealand) Night of the Red Hunter | ABC TV | 20 January |
| (United States) Cop Rock | Network Ten | 23 January |
| (United States) Little Golden Book Land | Seven Network | 24 January |
| (United States) WIOU | Network Ten | 24 January |
| (United States) / (Japan) A Galactic Odyssey | Nine Network | 26 January |
| (United Kingdom) Two by Two | ABC TV | 28 January |
| (United Kingdom) Birds of a Feather | Seven Network | 30 January |
| (United Kingdom) The Generation Game | Seven Network | 1 February |
| (United States) Dinosaurs | Seven Network | 2 February |
| (United States) Inside Edition | Network Ten | 4 February |
| (United Kingdom) Oceans of Wealth | SBS TV | 10 February |
| (United States) Home Improvement | Seven Network | 12 February |
| (United States) Freddy's Nightmares | Seven Network | 13 February |
| (United Kingdom) Bicycle | SBS TV | 18 February |
| (United States) Toxic Crusaders | Seven Network | 21 February |
| (Netherlands) Pim | SBS TV | 22 February |
| (Canada) The Magic Library | ABC TV | 25 February |
| (Canada) Zardip's Search for Healthy Wellness | ABC TV | 26 February |
| (Canada) Take a Look | ABC TV | 26 February |
| (Canada) Look Up | ABC TV | 26 February |
| (United States) The Family Man (1990) | Seven Network | 26 February |
| (United States) A Pup Named Scooby-Doo | Seven Network | 3 March |
| (United Kingdom) Portrait of a Marriage | ABC TV | 8 March |
| (United Kingdom) Gophers! | Network Ten | 8 March |
| (Australia) / (New Zealand) / (United Kingdom) The Other Side of Paradise | Network Ten | 8 March |
| (Italy) Secret of the Sahara | ABC TV | 19 March |
| (United Kingdom) Oranges Are Not the Only Fruit | ABC TV | 5 April |
| (United States) Gabriel's Fire | Seven Network | 8 April |
| (United Kingdom) Girls on Top | ABC TV | 13 April |
| (United States) Life Goes On | Nine Network | 19 April |
| (Canada) Katts and Dog | Nine Network | 21 April |
| (United Kingdom) / (Australia) Heroes II: The Return | Network Ten | 27 April |
| (United States) My Little Pony 'n Friends | Nine Network | 2 May |
| (United States) / (Canada) Beetlejuice | Nine Network | 2 May |
| (United Kingdom) Nellie the Elephant | ABC TV | 4 May |
| (United Kingdom) The Darling Buds of May | Seven Network | 8 May |
| (United Kingdom) Small World | ABC TV | 11 May |
| (United Kingdom) Brother Felix and the Virgin Saint | ABC TV | 17 May |
| (United Kingdom) The Cloning of Joanna May | Seven Network | 18 May |
| (United States) Working Girl | Network Ten | 18 May |
| (United Kingdom) Keeping Up Appearances | ABC TV | 18 May |
| (United States) Yo Yogi! | Seven Network | 22 May |
| (United Kingdom) The Brollys | ABC TV | 25 May |
| (United Kingdom) This is David Harper | SBS TV | 26 May |
| (United States) Teach 109 | SBS TV | 28 May |
| (France) Passengers | SBS TV | 28 May |
| (Canada) Return to the Magic Library | ABC TV | 2 June |
| (United Kingdom) Sticky Moments | ABC TV | 5 June |
| (United States) Uncle Buck | Network Ten | 7 June |
| (United Kingdom) Beadle's About | Network Ten | 9 June |
| (United Kingdom) Forget Me Not Farm | ABC TV | 11 June |
| (Canada) Tropical Heat | Network Ten | 12 June |
| (United States) Best of the Worst | Seven Network | 13 June |
| (United States) Herman's Head | Seven Network | 25 June |
| (United Kingdom) Murder Squad | ABC TV | 25 June |
| (United States) Coming of Age | Network Ten | 29 June |
| (Canada) The Red Green Show | SBS TV | 30 June |
| (New Zealand) / (Canada) The Boy from Andromeda | Seven Network | 4 July |
| (United States) / (South Korea) Widget | ABC TV | 6 July |
| (United States) Harry and the Hendersons | ABC TV | 6 July |
| (Australia) / (United Kingdom) The Leaving of Liverpool | ABC TV | 8 July |
| (United Kingdom) Titmuss Regained | ABC TV | 12 July |
| (United States) One of the Boys (1989) | Seven Network | 13 July |
| (United Kingdom) Watt on Earth | ABC TV | 19 July |
| (Canada) Nature Watch Digest | ABC TV | 20 July |
| (Canada) Tales from the Blue Crystal | ABC TV | 30 July |
| (United Kingdom) The Ginger Tree | ABC TV | 2 August |
| (United Kingdom) Wipe Out | ABC TV | 6 August |
| (United States) The Torkelsons | Seven Network | 10 August |
| (Spain) Central Brigade | SBS TV | 12 August |
| (United States) Nightmare Cafe | Seven Network | 12 August |
| (United Kingdom) New Guinea: An Island Apart | ABC TV | 16 August |
| (United States) Step by Step | Seven Network | 16 August |
| (Canada) The Acme School of Stuff | ABC TV | 21 August |
| (United Kingdom) Shadow of the Noose | ABC TV | 24 August |
| (United States) Pacific Station | Seven Network | 25 August |
| (United Kingdom) Classic Cars | SBS TV | 25 August |
| (United States) Coach | Network Ten | 28 August |
| (United Kingdom) Parnell and the Englishwoman | ABC TV | 30 August |
| (United Kingdom) Bangers and Mash | ABC TV | 31 August |
| (United Kingdom) A Bit of Fry and Laurie | ABC TV | 31 August |
| (United Kingdom) On the Up | ABC TV | 7 September |
| (United States) Harris and Company | Network Ten | 8 September |
| (United Kingdom) Worlds Beyond | ABC TV | 13 September |
| (United States) And the Sea Will Tell | Nine Network | 13 September |
| (United Kingdom) Windfalls | ABC TV | 14 September |
| (United Kingdom) Yellowthread Street | Seven Network | 15 September |
| (United Kingdom) Close to Home (1989) | Seven Network | 17 September |
| (United Kingdom) / (United States) Columbus and the Age of Discovery | SBS TV | 20 September |
| (United States) Walter & Emily | Seven Network | 23 September |
| (Germany) Pyjamas for Three | SBS TV | 1 October |
| (United Kingdom) Gruey | ABC TV | 2 October |
| (United Kingdom) / (Australia) Frankie's House | ABC TV | 7 October |
| (United States) Raven | Nine Network | 13 October |
| (Republic of Ireland) Making a Stand | SBS TV | 18 October |
| (Germany) Kir Royal – Aus dem Leben eines Klatschreporters | SBS TV | 30 October |
| (United States) Amerika | Nine Network | 2 November |
| (United States) Cruel Doubt | Seven Network | 15 November |
| (United States) Morton & Hayes | Nine Network | 18 November |
| (United Kingdom) Mother Love | ABC TV | 23 November |
| (United Kingdom) The Power and the Glory | Nine Network | 29 November |
| (United Kingdom) The Sharp End | ABC TV | 1 December |
| (United States) The Commish | Nine Network | 3 December |
| (United States) Nurses | Seven Network | 6 December |
| (United Kingdom) The Brittas Empire | ABC TV | 7 December |
| (United Kingdom) Streets Apart | ABC TV | 7 December |
| (United States) Northern Exposure | Network Ten | 10 December |
| (United Kingdom) Covington Cross | Network Ten | 12 December |
| (United Kingdom) May to December | ABC TV | 12 December |
| (United Kingdom) Granpa | ABC TV | 13 December |
| (United States) The Trials of Rosie O'Neill | Nine Network | 21 December |
| (United Kingdom) The BFG | ABC TV | 25 December |
| (Canada) The Woman Who Raised a Bear as Her Son | SBS TV | 25 December |
| (United Kingdom) Father Christmas | ABC TV | 25 December |
| (Japan) Samurai Pizza Cats | Seven Network | 1992 |
| (United States) The Legend of Prince Valiant | Seven Network | 1992 |
| (United States) Garfield and Friends | Network Ten | 1992 |
| (Japan) Bob in a Bottle | Seven Network | 1992 |
| (United Kingdom) Tales from Fat Tulip's Garden | ABC TV | 1992 |

== Changes to network affiliation ==
This is a list of programs which made their premiere on an Australian television network that had previously premiered on another Australian television network. The networks involved in the switch of allegiances are predominantly both free-to-air networks or both subscription television networks. Programs that have their free-to-air/subscription television premiere, after previously premiering on the opposite platform (free-to air to subscription/subscription to free-to air) are not included. In some cases, programs may still air on the original television network. This occurs predominantly with programs shared between subscription television networks.

=== International ===
| Program | New network(s) | Previous network(s) | Date |
|---|---|---|---|
| (Australia) / (France) / (United States) Clowning Around | ABC TV | Seven Network | 20 December |

== Television shows ==
ABC TV

- Mr. Squiggle and Friends (1959–1999)
- Four Corners (1961–present)
- Rage (1987–present)
- G.P. (1989–1996)
- Foreign Correspondent (1992–present)
- The Late Show (1992–1993)
- Vidiot (1992–1995)

Seven Network

- Wheel of Fortune (1981–1996, 1996–2003, 2004-beyond)
- A Country Practice (1981–1994)
- Home and Away (1988–present)
- Family Feud (1988–1996)
- Fast forward (1989–1992)

Nine Network

- Sunday (1981–2008)
- Today (1982 – present)
- Sale of the Century (1980–2001)
- A Current Affair (1971–1978, 1988–2005, 2006–present)
- Hey Hey It's Saturday (1971–1999)
- The Midday Show (1973–1998)
- 60 Minutes (1979–present)
- The Flying Doctors (1986–1991)
- Australia's Funniest Home Video Show (1990–present)
- Hey Hey It's Saturday (1971–1999)

Network Ten

- Neighbours (1985 – present)
- E Street (1989–1993)
- Good Morning Australia with Bert Newton (1991)

== Ending this year ==
| Date | Show | Channel | Debut |
|---|---|---|---|
| 7 February | The Bugs Bunny Show | Channel Nine | 1990 |
| 3 April | Chances | Channel Nine | 1991 |
| 23 April | Good Vibrations | Seven Network | 22 April 1992 |
| 1 May | Ferry Boat Fred | ABC | 30 March 1992 |
| 4 May | Heroes II: The Return | Channel Ten | 27 April 1992 |
| 1 June | DAAS Kapital | ABC | 1991 |
| 28 June | Sylvania Waters | ABC | 7 March 1992 |
| 6 July | Tracks of Glory | Channel Seven | 5 July 1992 |
| 20 August | Embassy | ABC | 1990 |
| 4 September | Australia's Naughtiest Home Videos | Nine Network | 4 September 1992 |
| 17 October | Double Dare | Channel Ten | 1989 |
| 6 November | Big Square Eye | ABC | 1991 |
| 4 November | Acropolis Now | Channel Seven | 1989 |
| 26 November | Fast forward | Channel Seven | 1989 |
| 4 December | The Miraculous Mellops | Channel Ten | 1991 |
| 5 December | Kelly | Channel Ten | 1991 |
| 13 December | Finders Keepers | ABC | 1991 |
| 18 December | Good Morning Australia | Network Ten | 1981 |
| 19 December | Bony | Seven Network | 15 August 1992 |

== See also ==
- 1992 in Australia
- List of Australian films of 1992
