= The Afternoon Show (Australian TV series) =

Australian children's television series

- Genre: Children's Afternoon Magazine
- Created by: Harvey Shore
- Presented by: James Valentine (1987–1990); Stephanie Osfield (1991); Michael Tunn (1991–1993)
- Composer: Paul Mac
- Country of origin: Australia
- Original language: English
- No. of seasons: 7

Original release
- Network: ABC TV
- Release: 16 February 1987 – 17 December 1993

The Afternoon Show is an Australian children's afternoon magazine television series that aired on the ABC from 16 February 1987 to 17 December 1993. It was the wrapper show for the afternoon children's programming block between 5:00 pm. to 6:00 p.m.

Presented by James Valentine (1987–1990), Basia Bonkowski (1990), Stephanie Osfield (1991) and Michael Tunn (1991–1993), the show aired a selection of cartoons such as The Mysterious Cities of Gold, Inspector Gadget, Spartakus and the Sun Beneath the Sea, Count Duckula, Danger Mouse, Widget, Alvin and the Chipmunks, Roger Ramjet, The Ratties, Captain Planet and the Planeteers, Bananaman, The Trap Door, The Adventures of Tintin and Rocky and Bullwinkle as well as a variety of different comedy, drama, adventure, action and game shows including such International programs as Grange Hill (plus a behind-the-scenes special of the series), Doctor Who, The Campbells, You Can't Do That on Television, all four original shows in the Degrassi trilogy (as well as the television movie School's Out), The Baby-Sitters Club, Dramarama, Return of the Antelope, Monkey, Milligan, Danger Bay, Metal Mickey, Press Gang, Barriers, The New Adventures of Beans Baxter, Grim Tales, The Goodies, The Lion, the Witch and the Wardrobe, Your Mother Wouldn't Like It, Educating Marmalade and several British children's short lived adventure, drama and comedy shows and serials and Australian shows like Vidiot, Behind the News, Secret Valley, Pals, Big Square Eye, Earthwatch, Finders Keepers, c/o The Bartons (a show that only aired on ABC once in 1988 but still aired on the BBC in the UK) and a two-part special created for The Afternoon Show called Bodybeat. The show sometimes airs music videos in between gaps.

The original host, James Valentine left at the end of the 80s, and the series had a couple of female hosts fill in until a permanent host could be found. In May 1991, 17 year-old Michael Tunn, Australia's youngest professional radio presenter at the time, took over hosting duties until it was eventually discontinued just over 2 years later.

In January 1993, the show later had a Summer Edition with five extra programs including all ten episodes of Finders Keepers, reruns of The Ratties and Roger Ramjet, debuts of the American-British-Welsh animated series Fantastic Max and the British drama and serial series Dodgem, Troublemakers, The Gift and Sweet Seventeen and small repeats of Big Square Eye.

Several months after the show was axed in late 1993, it was replaced by a new half hour music series called Loud. Hosted by Michael Tunn (who hosted The Afternoon Show from 13 May 1991 to 17 December 1993), it featured music videos, video game and movie reviews, feature stories on youth culture, on location interviews with bands and musicians talking about their favourite bands. The series first aired on 11 April 1994 and was shown on ABC from Monday to Thursday every afternoon at 5:30. The final episode was broadcast on 16 June 1994.
