= Bigfatradio.com =

Bigfatradio.com was an Australian internet only radio station by the Interactive Media Network. It starting webcasting in 2000 around 19 April. It ceased webcasting about six months later. It used proprietary web page streaming technology so that the end user was able to view pages sent from the studio.

The station featured many ex Triple J staff including Michael Tunn, Angela Catterns, Andy Glitre, Helen Razer, Ian Rogerson and Debbie Spillane. Therefore, the station had a strong Triple J influence.

It was believed that using well known radio personalities would increase the popularity and also help it to expand.

The station featured Angela Catterns as a Presenter and host of Daily Crunch programme as well as John Carroll as a music director and scheduler and Ian Rogerson as the creative director.

The station was forced to close due to a lack of funding available. Bruce Robson, the station's marketing director, mainly blamed this on bad timing as the station was introduced, shortly after the demise of other internet sites such as K-Grind and Spike and therefore investors were not as willing to invest as before.

Chris Gilbey, co-founder of BigFatRadio and chief executive officer of parent company InterActive Media Network, said the concept was "perhaps a little ahead and a little behind the game'", as such an exact attempt at a radio station had not been attempted before however they were not expecting the ending it had received.

The domain name has since been sold and reused.
