= Catterns =

Catterns is a surname. Notable people with the surname include:

- Angela Catterns (born 1953), Australian media personality and broadcaster
- Basil Catterns (1917–2007), Australian businessman, soldier, and yachtsman
- Basil G. Catterns (1886–1969), chief cashier of the Bank of England
