= The Unguarded Moment =

(The) Unguarded Moment may refer to:

- The Unguarded Moment (film), a 1956 film starring George Nader, Esther Williams, John Saxon
- "The Unguarded Moment" (song), sung by The Church from album Of Skins and Heart
- "The Unguarded Moment", an episode of the Canadian series The Bridge
- Unguarded Moment, a novel by Sara Craven
