= The Big Breakfast (disambiguation) =

The Big Breakfast was a British morning television program which ran from 1992 to 2002.

The Big Breakfast may also refer to:

- The Big Breakfast (Australian TV program), a 1992–1995 Australian children's breakfast television program
- The Big Breakfast (Canadian TV program), a 1997–2005 Canadian morning news and entertainment program
- The Big Breakfast, later known as The Big Arvo, a 1999–2005 Australian children's television series

== See also ==
- "Big Breakfast", a song by Tom Cardy from the 2021 EP Artificial Intelligence
- Big Breakfast, a breakfast platter at McDonald's
