= Jonathan Coleman (presenter) =

Australian broadcaster (1956–2021)

Jonathan Coleman OAM
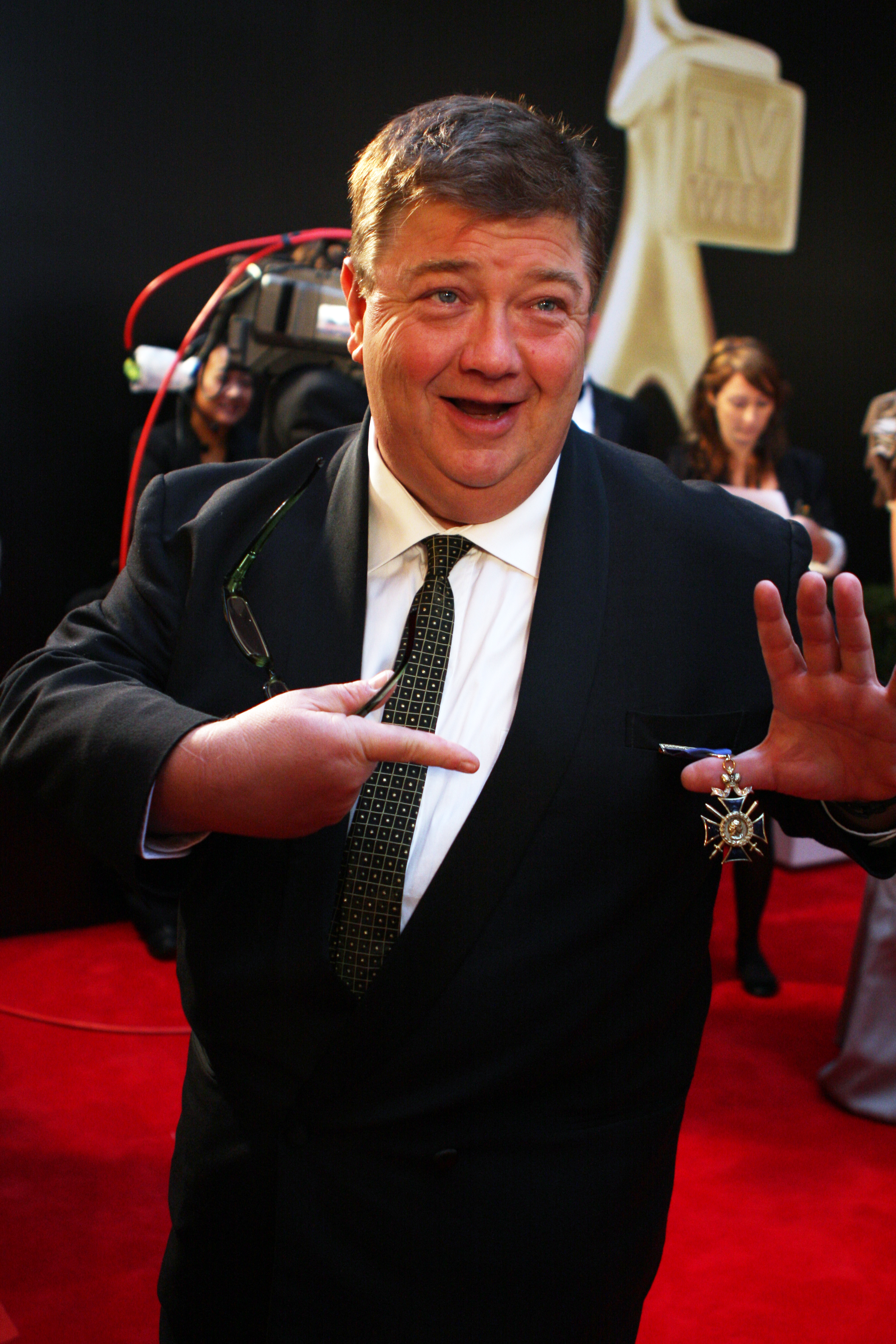
- Coleman in 2011
- Born: Jonathan Henry Coleman; 29 February 1956; London, England
- Died: 9 July 2021 (aged 65); Sydney, New South Wales, Australia
- Other name: Jono Coleman
- Citizenship: Australian
- Occupations: Television personality; radio announcer; writer; performer; comedian; voice actor; advertorial spokesman
- Years active: 1970s–2021
- Spouse: Margot Fitzpatrick
- Children: 2

Jonathan "Jono" Henry Coleman OAM (29 February 1956 – 9 July 2021) was an English-born Australian television presenter, radio announcer, writer, comedian, and advertorial spokesperson. He was known for his career in his native country and Australia.

== Early life ==
Coleman was born in Hackney, east London, in 1956. His family moved to Australia, where his career began. He had Ashkenazi Jewish ancestry.

== Career ==
=== Television and radio ===
Coleman's broadcasting career started in the late 1970s in Australia, when he was chosen as a member of the reporting team for the popular afternoon children's TV magazine show Simon Townsend's Wonder World, created and hosted by journalist Simon Townsend.

This was followed by several years as a DJ and presenter on the ABC's youth radio network Triple J, including a stint as co-host (with Ian Rogerson) on the popular Sunday afternoon comedy program Off The Record, a program that featured the talents of comedy group The J-Team, which included comedians Lance Curtis, Adam Bowen, and Angela Webber.

In 1983, Coleman starred in the Australian movie Midnite Spares alongside well known Australian actors Max Cullen and Gia Carides.

The following year, Coleman and Ian 'Dano' Rogerson moved to Triple M, where they took the show to the number 1 position. That same year, Coleman released an album titled Jonathan Coleman's Polka Project. A single from that release, "Busy Bleeding", under the pseudonym Wide Boy Youth, peaked at number 53 on the ARIA Charts (at the time, compiled using the Kent Music Report).

In 1988, Coleman had a part in the Australian movie Young Einstein. The same year, Coleman and Rogers began hosting a new music television programme on The Seven Network. Saturday Morning Live was broadcast from Sydney, nationally from 9 am to 12:30 pm every Saturday morning. The programme was a mixture of music videos, live performances, interviews with musicians and performers, location items, and comedy performances (usually in character as Jono & Dano). The show was immediately popular, and soon became the most watched music programme on Australian television.

For the second season of Saturday Morning Live in 1989, the producers decided to expand on the comedy aspect, and introduced a cast of comedic performers to work alongside Coleman and Rogerson. The new format was not successful, and in mid-1989 the comedy component was dropped, and the emphasis on music (in particular live performances) was re-established. To appeal to a younger demographic, two young actors from the Seven Network teen drama Home and Away were recruited onto the show. Emily Symons and Mat Stevenson co-hosted the new Saturday Morning Live as well as presenting occasional location reports.

Just as the programme was re-establishing its audience, and the ratings were improving, the Seven Network suddenly axed Saturday Morning Live in December 1989. This would be the last time Jono & Dano worked together as a double act on television.

From 1990 to 1991, Coleman returned to the UK to host the late night show Jonathan Coleman’s Swing Shift on The Power Station, BSB's music channel. The show was cancelled after only one year, as The Power Station was shut down due to Sky's merger with BSB.

In 1991, Coleman appeared in Episode 3 of the six-part mini-series The Diamond Brothers: South by South East as Mr. Blondini, an Escape artist.

In 1992, Coleman worked as an announcer and sidekick on the Lifetime game show Born Lucky hosted by former one-time Wheel of Fortune host and Entertainment Tonight reporter Bob Goen.

Coleman also appeared on the British television programmes Food & Drink, Noel's House Party, Swing Shift, Hit the Road, Celebrity Fit Club, Celebrities Under Pressure, I'm Famous and Frightened!, and Have I Been Here Before?. He also provided the voice of the narrator for the children's show The Koala Brothers.

In 1996, Coleman appeared in an episode of the ITV sitcom Is It Legal? as a DJ on the fictional station Hounslow FM.

In 2003, Coleman voiced as the narrator in the kids show The Koala Brothers.

=== UK radio ===
Coleman's UK radio career began at BBC GLR in 1990, before moving to Virgin Radio in May 1993, presenting the Sunday – Thursday evening show from 7–10pm. In July 1993, he co-presented the breakfast show alongside Russ Williams, where he remained until October 1997, moving to the drivetime show upon Chris Evans' arrival at the station.

Coleman was fired from Virgin Radio in early 1998, and moved to London's Heart 106.2, presenting the breakfast show. He co-hosted the show with Harriet Scott from mid-2002.

In early 2005, despite his breakfast show contributing to Heart 106.2 becoming the most listened to commercial radio station in London, he was axed, moving to sister station LBC 97.3, where for a short time he took over the weekend mid-morning show from 10 am – 1 pm.

On 25 July 2005, Coleman took over the 3–5pm afternoon show on BBC London 94.9 and from 17 October 2005, he took over the breakfast show from Danny Baker, co-presenting with JoAnne Good. By January 2007, he had left BBC London and the UK to be near his 81-year-old mother Sylvia, in Sydney, Australia.

Coleman also had a daily weekday slot with presenter Russ Williams on FIX Radio, a radio station for tradespeople in the UK.

=== Return to Australia ===
Following his return to Australia, Coleman hosted the drive time radio slot 4–7pm across Australia on the "Classic Hits' network (part of Australian Radio Network) and regional stations from 2007 to 2011. The show was initially known as The Jonathan Coleman Experience, a show he hosted with RocKwiz presenter Julia Zemiro. In 2009, he reunited with Rogerson and presented The Jono & Dano Show, taking the show to the number 2 drive time slot on FM radio in Sydney and Melbourne.

Coleman also became a regular reporter for Channel Seven's morning news program Sunrise, for which he had previously appeared presenting entertainment news from London. His regular segment was reviewing movies, and he also presented entertainment news for Mornings with Kerri-Anne on the Nine Network.

Coleman appeared regularly for many international television crossovers from the United Kingdom for Australian television. He also wrote for several UK publications, including the column "Coleman's Bowls" for Punch magazine, and contributed to the national Daily Star newspaper, OK! magazine and London's Evening Standard newspaper.

Coleman provided voice-overs and narrations for many products both in Australia and internationally, for companies such as Tooheys, Foster's, Qantas, the Australian Tourist Commission, and BBC TV, as well as in-flight programs for Qantas, Air New Zealand and Britannia.

He was the voice of the award-winning Australian 1970s and 80s music radio programme My Generation from 2004 to 2010, heard on the Australian Radio Network stations Gold 104 (Melbourne), WS-FM (Sydney), 4KQ (Brisbane), Mix 102.3 FM (Adelaide), Mix 106.3 FM (Canberra), and more than 100 other radio stations throughout Australia.

In 2007, he filmed a cameo for the long-running Australian soap opera Neighbours, in which he was one of the witnesses at Karl and Susan Kennedy's wedding.

Coleman latterly worked at Network Ten, presenting news and entertainment reports. He also presented advertorials on the station's morning TV programme Studio 10.

==== Suspension from Sunrise ====
On 2 August 2007, Coleman was suspended indefinitely from Sunrise for revealing the supposed ending to the novel Harry Potter and the Deathly Hallows on air. He later said that he had not read the book, and the Seven Network released a statement regarding his actions. Sunrise announced that their viewers would decide whether he would be fired. He kept his job with 70% of the vote.

== Honours ==
Coleman was awarded the Medal of the Order of Australia in 2015 for services to broadcast media and the community. He worked with the School for the Deaf and Blind, Carers' Australia, Radio for the Print Handicapped, the Schizophrenia Research Institute and latterly the Movember Foundation.

== Personal life and death ==
Coleman lived in North London from 1990 until his return to Australia in 2006. He resided in Sydney until his death on 9 July 2021, aged 65, from prostate cancer. He was married to Margot Fitzpatrick (1990 to his Death 2021), and had two children, Emily and Oscar.

== Discography ==
=== Studio albums ===
List of albums
Title	Album details
Jonathan Coleman's Polka Project	Released: 1984; Format: LP; Label: Really Big Records (250808-1)

=== Singles ===
List of singles, with Australian chart positions
Year	Title	Peak chart positions
Year	Title	AUS
1981	"Aussies on 45" (with The Brenda Gee Singers)	66
1981	"You Are What You Eat" (with The Art Fishell Orchestra)	–
1983	"Built for Comfort" (with The Big Boys & Ricky May)	–
1984	"Busy Bleeding" (as Wide Boy Youth)	53
