= Scott Sims =

Scott Sims may refer to:

- Scott Sims (basketball) (born 1955), American professional basketball player
- Scott Sims (veterinarian) (1955–2015), American veterinarian and television personality

== See also ==
- Scott Simms (born 1969), Canadian politician
