= The Jonathan Coleman Experience =

- Genre: Talk show/Music
- Running time: 2 hours
- Country of origin: Australia
- Home station: WSFM
- Starring: Jonathan Coleman and Julia Zemiro
- Original release: 2006 – 2008
- Website: www.jonathancolemanexperience.com

The Jonathan Coleman Experience was an Australian nationally syndicated radio program. It was hosted by radio and television personality Jonathan Coleman and comedian Julia Zemiro from 2006 until 2008. It was succeeded by the Jono & Dano Show.

== Affiliates ==
Affiliates of The Jonathan Coleman Experience included stations on the Australian Radio Network as well as stations in the Macquarie Regional RadioWorks network.

- New South Wales:
  - Sydney: 101.7 WSFM
  - Griffith: 2RG
  - Coffs Harbour: 2CS FM
  - Orange: 2GZ FM
  - Port Macquarie: 2MC FM
  - Wagga Wagga: 2WG
  - Young: 2LF
- Victoria:
  - Melbourne: Gold 104.3
  - Bendigo: 3BO FM
  - Mildura: 3MA FM
  - Shepparton: 3SR FM
  - Warragul-Gippsland: 3GG
- Queensland:
  - Brisbane: 4KQ
  - Charters Towers: 4GC
  - Emerald: 4HI
  - Mareeba-Atherton: 4AM
  - Mount Isa: 4LM
  - Kingaroy: Heart 1071
  - Roma: 4ZR
  - Toowoomba-Warwick: 4GR
- South Australia:
  - Mount Gambier: 5SE
- Tasmania:
  - Hobart: Heart 107
  - Burnie: Heart 7BU
  - Devonport: Heart 7AD
  - Scottsdale: Heart 7SD
