= Simon Townsend's Wonder World =

1979–1987 Australian children's TV series

- Presented by: Simon Townsend
- Country of origin: Australia
- No. of episodes: 2,000+

Production
- Running time: 30 minutes (including commercials)

Original release
- Network: Network Ten
- Release: 3 September 1979 – 1987

Simon Townsend's Wonder World! is an Australian children's television show that aired on Network Ten from 1979 until 1987. It was created and hosted by journalist Simon Townsend. In 1993, the show was relaunched on the Nine Network as Wonder World!, hosted by Pascall Fox.

== Format ==
Each episode of Simon Townsend's Wonder World! featured an introduction by Townsend as the studio host, accompanied by his pet and companion bloodhound Woodrow (Woodrow died in 1986 and was replaced at first with a sulphur-crested cockatoo and then with a Labrador Retriever puppy. A competition was run amongst the viewers to name the new puppy and as Townsend had recently won a Logie award, the puppy was named Logie). Townsend would then present four individual magazine-style stories, each presented by a different reporter.

The stories covered many subjects—sometimes serious, sometimes funny, always entertaining. The production team included an executive producer (for most of the show's run, this was Harvey Shore), plus as associate producer, a production assistant, two researchers, two cinematographers, two sound recordists, four reporters and four editors. This team produced the equivalent of one average feature film every week—about eighty minutes of screen time—shot on 16mm reversal film. Stories were not scripted; each one relying upon the researcher's report, the producer's briefing, and the ingenuity of the reporter and the two-person crew.

Every show also contained a viewer segment, and a music segment—often produced by the program itself. For instance, Simon Townsend's Wonder World! made the first-ever music video to feature Australian band INXS. During the course of the series, Townsend and his reporters travelled all over Australia and to many and varied locations in America, the UK, Europe, India, Asia, New Zealand, Fiji, the Philippines, and other places in the Pacific region. But Simon Townsend always insisted that Wonder World stories should generally be timeless and placeless, so—although produced in Sydney—they would always appeal to "Tom in Perth".

Simon Townsend would end every show with the same signature farewell—"And remember, the world really is wonderful!"

== History ==
The program was conceived by Townsend in the early 1970s and was designed to be a fast-moving daily dose of informed entertainment for children, as well as be suitable for and attractive to older teens and adults.

Both the Nine and the Seven networks helped Townsend make pilots for his concept, but neither network bought the series. However, in 1979 when the Australian Broadcasting Tribunal introduced a compulsory 'C' classification (making it a requirement for networks to broadcast only 'C' classified shows between 4 pm and 5 pm weekdays), Townsend saw the potential and offered the Ten Network, which was searching for a suitable children's program at the time, the opportunity to produce his show.

The first episode of Simon Townsend's Wonder World! went to air on 3 September 1979 in Sydney and 10 September 1979 in Melbourne. In early 1980 the ratings shot up and other capital cities and regional stations began signing up for the show.

By the end of 1980 the show was screening in every TV broadcast region throughout Australia. Soon it became the top-rating program on the Ten Network outside prime time—and sometimes its ratings were better than prime-time programs. For many years the Ten Network ran two episodes of Simon Townsend's Wonder World every weekday because of its ratings power—a repeat show at 4 pm followed by a new show at 4:30 pm.

After 1,961 episodes, the show ended in 1987 with the final episode broadcast in Sydney on 20 August 1987 and in Melbourne on 3 September 1987

=== Wonder World! ===
Six years later, in 1993, the Nine Network decided to re-launch Townsend's show with a new host, Pascall Fox. The title was shortened to Wonder World!, and again ran every weekday afternoon on Nine for the next three years. It also used the same theme music as the original Simon Townsend's Wonder World! This version was sung by James Morley. At the time, Morley was the bass player for the rock band The Angels. Simon Townsend is still the rights holder to the theme music and the program format.

== Theme music ==
Simon Townsend was originally keen to use the 1976 Bill Danoff song Afternoon Delight as the theme song for his afternoon TV show. In fact, this song was used as the opener when the show first went to air. However, when the meaning of the lyrics was pointed out to him, Townsend decided to commission a new and original theme song clearly linked to the eponymous host of the show.

As a consequence, Townsend hired Australian songwriter/producer Chris Pelcer to write a theme song for Simon Townsend's Wonder World!. John St Peeters sang this original theme. It was arranged and produced by Mike Harvey at EMI Studios Sydney in 1979, and released as a single by RCA that same year. It was simply titled "Wonder World!" on the record sleeve. In 1983, Simon decided to re-record this theme song. John St Peeters was by then working in the US, and unavailable; so Simon cast around for a new voice and eventually settled on up-and-coming female singer, Naomi Louise Warne, who went on to achieve international fame as a blues singer, composer and instrumentalist. Warne's voice and style just edged out Edith Bliss, a reporter on Simon Townsend's Wonder World!, who had released her own songs, possessed a good voice, and was keen to get the gig. Warne's version of the theme was recorded in 1983 and again released on a record, and was used on the TV show every weekday afternoon for one season, then a new, upbeat re-recording by John St Peeters was used until Townsend's show ended in 1987.

== Awards and accolades ==
Simon Townsend's Wonder World! won many awards, including five Logie awards, a TV Star Award and many other trophies, certificates of commendation and popularity prizes. In 1983, Australian Prime Minister Bob Hawke presented Simon Townsend with a special 'Prime Minister's Award' trophy, commemorating the milestone of broadcasting the one thousandth episode of Simon Townsend's Wonder World! (as recorded in TV Week, issue of 9 June 1983).

Townsend Entertainments employed a number of people early in their careers. It was the first production company in Australia to employ a woman, Bronwyn Nicholas, as a full-time cinematographer. Another Wonder World! cinematographer, Andrew Lesnie, later won the Academy Award for Best Cinematography for The Lord of the Rings: The Fellowship of the Ring.

Former presenters include Jonathan Coleman, who later worked in television in Australia and the United Kingdom; Angela Catterns, who became a radio presenter; and Edith Bliss, who later worked in advertising and music. Philip Tanner and Maurice Parker became television producers. Tanner and Brett Clements later designed board games, an interest prompted by a Wonder World! segment on Crown & Andrews. Researcher Kristine Wyld went on to write and produce television drama series, and researcher Fiona Baker, who joined the program after graduating from university, later created series including RPA for the Nine Network and other networks.

== Reporters ==
The reporters on Simon Townsend's Wonder World! during its seven years on air included:

- Jonathan Coleman
- Angela Catterns
- Hugh Piper
- Sandy Mauger
- Edith Bliss
- Sheridan Jobbins
- Alita Fahey
- Maurice Parker
- Phillip Tanner
- Hugh Munro
- Brett Clements
- Wednesday Kennedy
- Adam Bowen
- Carolyn Mee
- Malinda Rutter
- Moira McLean
- Tim Vincent

== Wonder World! ==
In 1992, two of Simon Townsend's former reporters, Phillip Tanner and Brett Clements, purchased a license from Townsend to produce a new version of Simon Townsend's Wonder World! and sold the new version to the Nine Network, which re-launched the show. The successor's new name was shortened to Wonder World!. The "Wonder World!" theme song, written for the show at Simon Townsend's request by Australian songwriter/producer Chris Pelcer, remained the show's theme until its final episode.

Harvey Shore was hired to train new reporters and produce the show once again, this time for the Nine Network. The hosts and reporters of this new series were:

- Pascall Fox (famous for her brightly coloured hair, often red or orange. She was later one of the presenters of the Australian version of Ground Force in the early 2000s, and on the Australian version of the show Your Life on the Lawn (2003–2004))
- Jodie Young (who went on to star in Sex/Life, and in 1998 posed nude for Australian Playboy)
- Nick Penn
- Tony Johnston (who went on to produce many TV shows and to work overseas).

Later reporters included:

- Catriona Rowntree (who became a major star of the Nine Network in Getaway and other series)
- Dave Kelly (who became a film editor and producer)
- Sonia Kruger (who is most well known for her role in Strictly Ballroom).

Appearances on the show:

- Bill Bovill was "Today's Poet" and later referred to it on his blog.

Nine's Wonder World! began production in 1993, and rated well in its three-year run.

== See also ==
- List of Australian television series
