= The Unguarded Moment (song) =

Single by The Church

from the album Of Skins and Heart
- Released: March 1981
- Recorded: 1980
- Genre: Rock; new wave
- Length: 4:12
- Label: Parlophone
- Songwriters: Steve Kilbey, Mikela Uniacke
- Producers: Chris Gilbey, Bob Clearmountain

The Church singles chronology
"She Never Said" (1980)	"The Unguarded Moment" (1981)	"Too Fast for You" (1981)

"The Unguarded Moment" is a song by Australian alternative rock band the Church, released in March 1981. It was the second single from their 1981 debut album, Of Skins and Heart. It was written by Steve Kilbey, the group's frontman, singer and bass guitarist; and Mikela Uniacke (a.k.a. Michelle Parker), who were married at the time.

The song reached No. 22 on the Australian Kent Music Report singles chart, and was the band's first radio hit. It peaked at No. 19 on the New Zealand Singles Chart. The single and the album were released on EMI Records then newly revived Parlophone label.

Kilbey later said, "The song just doesn't appeal to me. It doesn't give me any pleasure at all. Maybe it was exciting for people who thought the country was going to be bogged down with the Human League and Buggles for the decade."

In January 2018, as part of Triple M's "Ozzest 100", the 'most Australian' songs of all time, "The Unguarded Moment" was ranked number 57. In 2025, the song placed 75 on the Triple J Hottest 100 of Australian Songs.

== Reception ==
Garry Raffaele of The Canberra Times described the track in June 1981, which "starts out with a bow towards the Beatles, then into a tightly constructed, powerfully written and pulsingly [sic] performed piece. And written so well... phrases like 'men with horses for hearts', 'friends with cameras for eyes'." In August 2002, it was reviewed by Rolling Stone's David Fricke as "The Church's 1981 jangling gem".

Donald Robertson of Roadrunner claimed that the band "ripped off the riff from "Ticket to Ride"" but opined that "it's what you do with stolen goods that counts, and the Church do good things with this" and also predicted the song would become "If given a chance – a hit."

== Track listing ==
The Unguarded Moment (Australian release)
No.	Title	Writer(s)	Length
1.	"The Unguarded Moment"	Steve Kilbey, Mikela Uniacke (a.k.a. Michelle Parker)	4:12
2.	"Busdriver"	Steve Kilbey	4:09
Total length:			8:21

The Unguarded Moment (European release)
No.	Title	Writer(s)	Length
1.	"The Unguarded Moment"	Steve Kilbey, Mikela Uniacke (a.k.a. Michelle Parker)	4:13
2.	"Chrome Injury"	Steve Kilbey	4:03
Total length:			8:16
