= Aloha Vet =

- Genre: Factual
- Created by: Mike Aho
- Starring: Dr. Scott Sims
- Country of origin: United States
- Original language: English
- No. of seasons: 1
- No. of episodes: 8

Production
- Executive producers: Eden Gaha; Mike Aho
- Producer: Shine America
- Production location: Hawaii
- Production company: Shine America

Original release
- Network: Nat Geo Wild (USA)
- Release: March 21 – May 9, 2015

Aloha Vet is an American factual television series that followed the late Dr. Scott Sims as he traveled Hawaii in the course of his veterinary career. Sims was in talks for a second season when he was diagnosed with bladder cancer, which he died of two months later on July 25, 2015.

== Synopsis ==
Scott Sims DVM, was a large and small animal veterinarian in Kauai, Hawaii, who owned and operated the Pegasus Veterinary Clinic from his Kauai estate. He traveled by specially fitted out Lexus suv, ATV, horseback, or in his from-a-kit, home-built, single-engine, single-prop plane to visit sick and injured animals of all kinds on multiple Hawaiian Islands, including his home island of Kauai, Oahu, Maui, Molokai, and the Island of Hawaii.

== Development ==
The idea for the series was presented to Sims by the show's production company, Shine America, after Sims appeared in a segment of a reality show featuring professional surfer Laird Hamilton. Eden Gaha and Mike Aho co-produced the series for Shine America as part of their expansion into the factual television genre.

Filming began in 2014. On September 24, 2014, Nat Geo Wild confirmed that the eight-episode series would air in the spring of 2015. The show premiered on March 21, 2015.

Sims was in talks for a second season when he was diagnosed with bladder cancer, which he died of two months later on July 25, 2015, at the age of 59.

== Episodes ==
The series had one season which included 8 episodes that aired from March 21, 2015, to May 9, 2015, on Nat Geo Wild.

No.	Title	Original release date
1	"Rude Awakening"	March 21, 2015
Introduction to Dr. Scott Sims and his clinic. Treatment of two dogs, horse with broken leg, potbellied pig, a parrot and a goat.
2	"Eyes Wide Shut"	March 28, 2015
Dr. Sims treats a horse, a coot, a blind pig and a goat and takes a trip to the Big Island to help an animal sanctuary.
3	"Swimming With Sharks"	April 4, 2015
Dr. Sims celebrates his birthday on Oahu by joining his friends on a shark-tagging expedition. He also treats a dog in need of emergency surgery.
4	"Last Resort"	April 11, 2015
Dr. Sims treats two goats, a horse, an old dog and an Angus bull.
5	"Hog Wild"	April 18, 2015
Dr. Sims treats birds, hunting dog and a herd of goats.
6	"Trouble in Paradise"	April 25, 2015
Dr. Sims treats a nene, tortoises and a friend's horse.
7	"Big Island, Big Problems"	May 2, 2015
Dr. Sims treats some feral cats, a horse and a dog born with only two legs.
8	"My Chicken Ate What?"	May 9, 2015
Ella and Dia plan a surprise luau to conclude Dr. Sims' interrupted birthday party.
