= TVTV (TV series) =

Australian television series (1993-94)

TVTV was an Australian television series that reported and commented on television. It was broadcast by the ABC from 1993 to 1994.

Originally launched in March 1993, it was hosted by Simon Townsend with a panel of reviewers composed of Sueyan Cox, James Valentine, John Hanrahan, Julia Gardiner and Edith Bliss. Townsend stepped down as host in June. James Valentine became the host and was joined as co-host by Caroline Baum. In 1994, the show stopped for a period, and production moved from Sydney to Melbourne. The show was revamped with Mark Mitchell and Tiffany Lamb as hosts, returning to air in August.

The Age’s Ross Warneke, commenting on early episodes, called it a turkey, writing "Its giggly, monosyllabic approach to TV news and reviews is down-market and intellectually offensive."
