= Pascall Fox =

Australian television presenter

Pascall Fox is an Australian TV presenter best known as the host of the children's television series Wonder World! in the early 1990s. She was also a presenter on the Australian edition of Ground Force, and the Australian edition of Your Life on the Lawn, both in the early 2000s.
