= Harvey Shore =

Australian film and TV writer-producer

- Born: 14 February 1947 (age 79); Randwick, New South Wales, Australia
- Occupations: Journalist; script writer; producer
- Known for: Simon Townsend's Wonder World producer

Harvey Shore is an Australian film and television writer-producer. Shore was the producer of the children's TV show, Simon Townsend's Wonder World from 1980 to 1986, which won five Logie Awards during his tenure.

== Early life ==
Harvey Shore was born on 14 February 1947 and grew up in Sydney. His father, Irvin Alfred (Ray) Shore (13 February 1905 – 1962), was a financial manager and his mother, Ivy Shore (née Williams, 14 January 1915 – 25 August 1999), (known to her friends as 'Billie') was a seamstress and secretary from Adelaide who later became an award-winning portrait artist – in 1979 she won the Portia Geach Memorial Award. His younger brother, Russell Shore (born 29 April 1949), later became a naval officer and a Master Mariner. In 1960 his parents separated and, after the death of Ray in 1962, Ivy settled into a lifetime partnership with the tonal impressionist artist, Graeme Inson. Harvey Shore was educated at Cranbrook School, Marist Brothers Agricultural College, and the Royal Military College, Duntroon.

== Film and television career ==
From 1972, Harvey Shore began a career as a writer-producer in film and television when he was invited to write a script for the ABC program Behind The News. This led to regular work on this show, and within a year he was Lead Writer for Behind The News, and soon became its script editor. He also began writing for commercial TV shows such as the soap opera Number 96, and producing short films at the Sydney Filmmakers Co-op. While researching for the Network TEN show Help Your Neighbour he was approached by Mike Willesee to work on his current affairs show Willesee At Seven and spent most of 1976 as researcher, reporter and producer on that show. While at the Seven Network, Shore also created and produced a TV Special called The Guinness Olympics in co-operation with the Guinness Book of Records. After two years handling publicity and promotion for dozens of local and international movies, from Mad Max to Can't Stop the Music. Shore was approached by Simon Townsend to be the producer of his TV show Simon Townsend's Wonder World! which started in 1979. The show won five Logie Awards during Shore's tenure: 'Outstanding Contribution to Children's Television' in 1980, 'Best Children's Television Series' in 1981, 'Most Popular Children's Program' in 1983, 1984 and 1985. Shore was invited to join ABC-TV as an executive Producer. His career now includes over 3,000 hours of broadcast credits, including work on more than 30 feature films and over 60 television shows – in roles from scriptwriter to executive producer. For his other film and television work, Harvey Shore has also won two AFI (Australian Film Institute) Awards, two International Broadcasting (Nagoya) Awards, a 'TV Star' Award, and the gold award for first prize at the Asian Broadcasting Union Festival, among many other awards.

== Other work ==
Shore has been a Public Relations Consultant, and worked as PR Manager for Village Roadshow Limited, the Maritime Services Board of NSW, and several other companies. He has written two books and worked as Senior Tutor in Scriptwriting and Public Relations for The Australian College of Journalism and Cengage Education. Shore has also written TV and pay-TV columns for MediaWeek, and for Encore Magazine, a film and television industry journal.

== Marine Rescue work ==
In 2007, Shore joined the Australian Volunteer Coast Guard. For his work during the Brisbane Floods of 2011, Shore received the National Emergency Medal and the Queensland Flood and Cyclone Citation. For his marine rescue work, Shore received a Commendation Certificate from the United States Coast Guard (22 Feb 2024).

== Bibliography ==
- Shore, Harvey (1981). From the Quay. Kensington, NSW: New South Wales University Press. ISBN 978-0-86840-328-1.
  - Shore, Harvey (1986). From the Quay. Kensington, NSW: Univ. Pr.
- Shore, Harvey; Australian Broadcasting Corporation (1992). G. P.: The Book of the ABC TV Series. Photographs by Melissa Lingard; medical advice by Carol Long. ABC Enterprises, Australian Broadcasting Corporation. ISBN 978-0-7333-0181-0.

== Filmography ==
- Major Cousens
- Jog’s Trot (short film)
- Davis, John; Wolfers, Howard; Shore, Harvey; Video Classroom (Firm: Vic.) (1990), Australians in Vietnam, Frenchs Forest, NSW: Classroom Video.
- Shore, Harvey (2002), Life Under Adolf Hitler a Totalitarian Regime, Produced by Harvey Shore; executive produced by John Davis, Warriewood, NSW: History Films Pty Ltd.

=== Television work ===
- Simon Townsend's Wonder World
- Number 96
- Behind the News
- G.P.
- Burke's Backyard
- New Wonder World!
