= The Koala Brothers =

British-Australian children's television series

- Genre: Preschool; Adventure
- Created by: David Johnson
- Voices of: Keith Wickham; Rob Rackstraw; Janet James; Lucinda Cowden
- Narrated by: Jonathan Coleman
- Theme music composer: Kick Production
- Opening theme: "Call the Koala Brothers"
- Ending theme: "Call the Koala Brothers" (instrumental)
- Composer: Kick Production
- Country of origin: United Kingdom
- Original language: English
- No. of series: 3
- No. of episodes: 79

Production
- Running time: 10 minutes per episode (approx.)
- Production companies: Famous Flying Films; Spellbound Entertainment

Original release
- Network: CBeebies
- Release: 1 September 2003 – 31 October 2007

The Koala Brothers is a British stop-motion animated children's television series, created by David Johnson. It features the adventures of two twin koala brothers named Frank and Buster, who pilot an aeroplane to help their friends in a sleepy town in the Australian outback. The series was narrated by Jonathan Coleman. 78 episodes were produced over three seasons, alongside one Christmas special.

Notably, while the series sometimes features disagreements and displays of poor behaviour, it avoids presenting any characters as purely villainous or unlikable. Instead, it emphasises the importance of kindness and friendship.

The series originally premiered on CBeebies on 1 September 2003 to October 31, 2007 and is particularly targeted at children from ages 2 to 6 years.

== Format ==
Broadcast episode formats vary slightly between countries, though the main material of each episode, with the titular characters assisting one of their friends and overcoming a problem, such as jealousy, fear, or the failure to share, does not change. In Australia, the show runs in episodes of around 12 minutes' length, though these are broadcast in pairs on ABC Kids, with the opening song "Call the Koala Brothers" repeated in instrumental form over the credits. CBeebies eliminates the introduction and closing song to squeeze the programme into a 10-minute format.

In the 30-minute broadcast version, the show opens with a slightly longer version of the theme song and then before each segment, the narrator introduces Frank and Buster as they fly in their yellow-blue two-seater propeller aeroplane above the outback. The supporting cast is introduced as the narrator asks, "Who do you think the Koala Brothers are going to help today?", followed by Frank's telescope showing the character they're going to help in each respective segment. Each 30-minute episode ends with "The Helping Song", in which all the characters gather at the Koala Brothers' homestead and sing about always trying to help and care for one another.

== Characters ==
=== Main ===
- Frank (voiced by Keith Wickham) is a koala who is the pilot of the airplane. He has demonstrated excellent skills in tennis and was the only member of the community able to defeat Archie, though Frank admitted it was probably just luck. He also fostered an interest in pottery at one point, but did not have any great artistic ability.
- Buster (voiced by Rob Rackstraw) is another koala who usually sits behind Frank in the airplane and uses his telescope to spot friends in need from the air. Buster is always willing to provide a pep talk or a hug to his friends. Buster speaks more softly than Frank, and has a small tuft of hair on the top of his head. Buster also loves to bake, especially butter cookies.
- The Narrator (voiced by Jonathan Coleman) is the narrator of the series.

=== Supporting ===
- Ned (voiced by Janet James) is a wombat who is the youngest member of the local community behind Mitzi, and lives in a caravan next door to the Koala Brothers' homestead. Ned is often not sure of himself, but he dreams of adventure and longs to be a hero like his idols, Frank and Buster. He is often determined and easily fixated on an idea, and often will come through with prompting.
- Mitzi (voiced by Lucinda Cowden) is a possum who lives in part of the Koala Brothers' homestead made over as her living quarters and is young and impressionable, often relying on the Koala Brothers to stay in line with her perfection-seeking impulses. However, she can get quite bossy and upset her friends at times, but she means no harm and her friends always forgive her as she is still working out her limits. A recurring sight-gag shows Mitzi slipping out of either or both her flip flops due to being constantly on the go.
- George (voiced by Rob Rackstraw) is a turtle and mail carrier. George has no established residence whatsoever, but he always delivers the mail with his trusty leather satchel. George is proud of being a mail carrier, and tells campfire stories in the outback. He also has an interest in stamp collecting.
- Sammy (voiced by Rob Rackstraw) is an echidna who owns a general store, which sells fuel in addition to comestibles. His only employee is Josie. As one of the more senior citizens, Sammy has the fewest problems after the Koala Brothers.
- Josie (voiced by Janet James) is a kangaroo who is Sammy's assistant and works at the outback's general store. She and Mitzi are good friends.
- Alice (voiced by Lucinda Cowden) is a platypus who works at the local café and appears to be the lone employee. Alice is very forgetful. She rides a green motor scooter around, which has its share of drastic engine problems. Alice loves to bake, and is good at following recipes, as well as reading maps.
- Archie (voiced by Keith Wickham) is a crocodile with a British accent who lives in a well-appointed cottage near a water hole. Archie is very cheerful and friendly, and is always exercising, stretching, or playing tennis, and is also renowned at being the best at almost every sport.
- Penny (voiced by Janet James) is a young penguin who lives in Antarctica, but has visited the outback on certain occasions and keeps up a regular written correspondence with the Koala Brothers. Unlike the other characters, she doesn’t talk and only communicates through chatters, baby noises, and sings "The Helping Song". Mitzi stubbornly believes that she is a duck.
- Lolly (voiced by Lucinda Cowden) is an emu who is an ice cream vendor and can often be seen driving her ice cream truck around the Outback. She often greets people by saying "How can I cool you down?" to them.

== Development ==
=== Inspiration ===
The Koala Brothers originated as a children's book and TV show proposal entitled "The Great Wungle Bungle Aerial Expedition", created by Greg McKee, which has a similar premise to the final product. The main two characters of The Koala Brothers first appeared in this proposal. In 1988, "The Great Wungle Bungle Aerial Expedition" was showcased along with animatronic character props at the "FirstState88" NSW Govt exhibition in Darling Harbour, part of the Australian Bicentenary. In the 1990s, McKee revised the concept as an animated series called Echidna Airways. McKee pitched the proposal, which was borrowed and modified to create The Koala Brothers. The series' animation style is reminiscent of the series Bob the Builder.

=== Ownership and distribution ===
In May 2002, the series's rights were purchased by Spellbound Entertainment, a newly formed start-up company founded by former HIT Entertainment executive Peter Curtis. In June, Spellbound pre-sold the series to CBeebies for a September 2003 delivery, consisting of twenty-six 10-minute episodes.

Spellbound would continue to sell the series worldwide until filing for liquidation in 2013. The Koala Brothers creator David Johnson purchased the rights to the series in February 2014 under a new joint-venture company called Koala Brothers Ltd., with Union Media as distributor.

== Episodes ==
=== Series overview ===
Season	Episodes	Originally aired		
Season	Episodes	First aired	Last aired	Network
1	26	September 1, 2003	August 27, 2004	CBeebies
2	26	October 11, 2004	August 26, 2005	CBeebies
3	27	October 10, 2005	October 31, 2007	CBeebies

=== Series 1 (2003–04) ===
No. overall	No. in season	Title	Original release date
1	1	"Archie's New Home"	1 September 2003
Archie the Crocodile moves into the old house by the outback's water hole, but nobody comes to his party.
2	2	"Sea Captain Ned"	2 September 2003
Ned the Wombat finds an old rowing boat in the outback, and decides to become a sea captain.
3	3	"The Thirsty Penguin"	3 September 2003
Frank and Buster meet a penguin backpacker named Penny, who has run out of water.
4	4	"A Letter for George"	4 September 2003
Mitzi the Possum writes George the Turtle a letter, but George loses it somewhere on his rounds.
5	5	"Josie's Big Jump"	7 September 2003
Josie the Kangaroo wants to learn how to jump rope, but thinks that her feet are too big. Frank realises that her skipping rope is not long enough.
6	6	"Alice Can't Remember"	8 September 2003
Alice the Platypus has trouble remembering things, so Frank gives her a small recollected string.
7	7	"Ned's Scary Night"	9 September 2003
Ned the Wombat finds it hard to sleep, because he is scared by the weird sounds he hears in the night.
8	8	"What Mitzi Wants"	10 September 2003
Mitzi the Possum really wants a toy carousel in Sammy the Echidna's shop, but doesn't have enough money to buy it.
9	9	"Ned the Policeman"	15 September 2003
Ned the Wombat finds a whistle by the side of the road, and decides to be a policeman.
10	10	"Sammy's Bumpy Ride"	16 September 2003
Frank and Buster help Sammy the Echidna achieve his dream of riding on a train.
11	11	"Archie's Loose Tooth"	17 September 2003
Archie the Crocodile is worried, because his head seems to be wobbling and starts to worry even more when he realises his tooth is the one that's wobbling and won't do things that he used to do. So Frank, Buster, Mitzi, and Ned try to help Archie stop worrying about it.
12	12	"Penny Comes to Stay"	18 September 2003
Penny the Penguin comes to visit, but Buster struggles to entertain her.
13	13	"Lolly Comes to Town"	19 September 2003
Lolly the Emu, the Ice Cream Vendor, gets into trouble when her van breaks down and her ice cream starts melting away.
14	14	"George and the Parcel"	20 September 2003
It is George the Turtle's birthday and the Koala Brothers know just what to get him – a truck for packages.
15	15	"Mitzi's Day Out"	23 September 2003
George the Turtle shows Mitzi a postcard of a sandy beach and Mitzi decides to go on a vacation.
16	16	"Sammy and the Moon"	24 September 2003
Sammy the Echidna secretly dreams of being the first shopkeeper to walk on the Moon.
17	17	"George's Day Off"	25 September 2003
There's no post for George the Turtle to deliver, but George doesn't know how to spend his free time.
18	18	"Archie to the Rescue"	26 September 2003
Archie the Crocodile becomes a superhero.
19	19	"Alice Rides Again"	29 September 2003
Alice the Platypus gets hurt when she falls off her scooter, The Koala Brothers explain whatever will Alice do.
20	20	"Ned the Pilot"	30 September 2003
Ned the Wombat wants to be a pilot just like his hero, Frank.
21	21	"Mitzi's Big Adventure"	18 August 2004
Mitzi the Possum organises a big adventure, but soon realises that being a leader is not at all easy.
22	22	"Ned's Special Visitor"	21 August 2004
Ned the Wombat introduces an imaginary friend as he wants a visitor.
23	23	"Lolly's Broken Bell"	22 August 2004
The bell on Lolly the Emu's ice cream van becomes completely busted, so no one in the outback knows that Lolly is around! Frank and Buster try their hardest to help her find a new sound.
24	24	"Ned Catches a Cold"	23 August 2004
Ned the Wombat gets his first cold and is too ill to work.
25	25	"Josie Can Dance"	24 August 2004
Everyone practices their acts for the outback talent show, but Josie the Kangaroo is frightened of dancing in public, but when Mitzi accidentally steps on Archie's ukulele, Josie must fill in for her.
26	26	"Penny Comes for Help"	27 August 2004
The Koala Brothers get a letter from Penny the Penguin who wants to knit a sweater for Lolly the Emu for the cold outback mornings.

=== Series 2 (2004–05) ===
No. overall	No. in season	Title	Original release date
27	1	"Sammy and the Bee"	11 October 2004
Sammy the Echidna loses one of his bees and Mitzi is puzzled, as she thinks all bees are the same.
28	2	"Alice Gets the Hiccups"	12 October 2004
Alice the Platypus can't cure her hiccups.
29	3	"Lolly's Long Goodbye"	13 October 2004
Lolly the Emu loves her job delivering ice cream, but it's hard to say goodbye when Lolly is about to move away.
30	4	"Ned's Buried Treasure"	14 October 2004
Ned the Wombat decides to bury some treasure, but neglects to draw a map and needs help to find it.
31	5	"Mitzi's Special Photos"	18 October 2004
Sammy the Echidna suggests that Mitzi has an exhibition of her photos, so Mitzi sets out to take some actual special ones.
32	6	"George's Big Mistake"	19 October 2004
George the Turtle spills tea inside his satchel and makes the addresses on his letters unreadable.
33	7	"Ned the Knight"	20 October 2004
Ned the Wombat decides to become a knight.
34	8	"Archie Goes Camping"	21 October 2004
Archie the Crocodile wants to be on his own and decides to go camping.
35	9	"Plane Crazy Ned"	22 October 2004
Aunt Mavis gives Ned the Wombat a remote-controlled plane.
36	10	"George's Big Race"	23 October 2004
George the Turtle is persuaded by Mitzi to run a race with Archie the Crocodile, who feels sure he will win.
37	11	"Sammy's Bad Day"	24 October 2004
Sammy the Echidna has a bad day, but the Koala Brothers help him get over it.
38	12	"George's Little Plant"	25 October 2004
Postman George the Turtle loves to chat to a little plant by the roadside, but the plant is wilting.
39	13	"Archie Tennis Ace"	26 October 2004
Archie the Crocodile is so good at sport that he wins every game, and demands to play on until Archie is defeated.
40	14	"Josie's Little Accident"	25 July 2005
Josie the Kangaroo breaks Sammy the Echidna's favourite coffee cup, owns up, and creates a wonderful new one for him.
41	15	"Penny's Big Game"	26 July 2005
Penny the Penguin is excited on the day of the outback croquet match.
42	16	"Mitzi's Busy Day"	27 July 2005
The Koalas are having a tea party, and Mitzi makes rash promises about how she can help.
43	17	"George Goes Faster"	11 August 2005
George the Turtle wants to be a faster postman, and tries everything, but nothing works until Buster suggests George use a skateboard.
44	18	"Ned Finds His Whistle"	12 August 2005
Ned the Wombat feels left out as he can't whistle, so Frank gets everyone to make another sound.
45	19	"Josie's New Tune"	13 August 2005
Josie the Kangaroo gets a tuba and realises that practice makes perfect.
46	20	"Sammy's Cuckoo Clock"	16 August 2005
Sammy the Echidna realises just how much he relies on his cuckoo clock.
47	21	"Archie Doesn't Listen"	17 August 2005
Archie the Crocodile's friends discover that Archie isn't the best listener.
48	22	"Josie in Charge"	18 August 2005
Josie the Kangaroo is in charge of the shop while Sammy takes a vacation.
49	23	"Penny's Birthday Surprise"	19 August 2005
It's Penny the Penguin's birthday and her friends have the perfect surprise.
50	24	"George's Broken Satchel"	20 August 2005
George the Turtle is losing his letters and someone else is delivering them.
51	25	"Lolly's New Flavor"	23 August 2005
Lolly the Emu has made a new spinach ice cream for the townsfolk, but Ned tells her that no one is going to like it.
52	26	"Alice Gets Lost"	26 August 2005
The Koala Brothers invite Alice the Platypus to a picnic, but Alice gets lost.

=== Series 3 (2005–07) ===
No. overall	No. in season	Title	Original release date
53	1	"Outback Christmas"	10 October 2005
Frank and Buster invite everyone to spend a holiday with them at the Homestead, but they are devastated when they discover that Penny the Little Penguin has hurt her wing and unable to join them.
54	2	"George the Sportsman"	11 October 2005
George the Turtle doesn't want to take part in a sports day because he thinks he is no good at anything apart from being a mailman.
55	3	"Ned's Shiny Balloon"	12 October 2005
Ned the Wombat doesn't want to share the cute balloon he's found tied to his caravan.
56	4	"Mitzi's Special Present"	13 October 2005
Mitzi the Possum wants her friend Josie the Kangaroo to have the best birthday ever.
57	5	"Ned and the Wagaloo"	14 October 2005
Ned the Wombat sets off to find a legendary creature, but forgets to tell his friends where he's going.
58	6	"Sammy's Spoons"	17 October 2005
Mitzi the Possum offends Sammy the Echidna when Mitzi says that the spoons are not actually musical instruments.
59	7	"Josie's Knotty Problem"	18 October 2005
Josie the Kangaroo's shoelaces keep coming undone and Josie cannot tie them up.
60	8	"Alice the Poet"	19 October 2005
Alice the Platypus receives a letter telling her that she has won a poetry competition.
61	9	"Archie's Giant Pumpkin"	20 October 2005
Archie the Crocodile tells them about a giant pumpkin that he's growing in his garden, but Archie exaggerates its size.
62	10	"Penny's Boomerang"	23 October 2005
On her flight to the homestead, Penny the Penguin's boomerang falls out of the airplane.
63	11	"Mitzi's Funny Honey"	24 October 2005
Mitzi the Possum discovers everyone laughing at Buster's jokes and decides to also be funny, so Mitzi pulls a practical joke on people, but manages to make them grumpy in the process.
64	12	"Ned Goes Red"	25 October 2005
It is a very hot day in the Outback, but Ned the Wombat forgets about sun cream and gets sunburned.
65	13	"Lolly and the Go-Kart"	28 October 2005
Lolly the Emu finds everyone making a go-kart, but everyone says Lolly's too big and clumsy to join in.
66	14	"Ned's Shooting Star"	4 October 2007
Ned the Wombat sees a shooting star land in the outback, but doubts himself when no one believes him.
67	15	"Sammy the Postman"	5 October 2007
When George the Turtle sprains his ankle, Sammy the Echidna readily offers to swap jobs.
68	16	"George the Magician"	6 October 2007
When Buster asks George the Turtle to put on a magic show, George tries to get out of it.
69	17	"Archie's Fall"	9 October 2007
When Archie the Crocodile has a fall before the tennis tournament, Archie decides not to tell anyone.
70	18	"Mitzi the Artist"	10 October 2007
Mitzi the Possum paints a picture of George the Turtle that looks just like him, but none of her other pictures turn out right.
71	19	"George's World"	11 October 2007
George the Turtle seems to know lots about different countries, but it transpires that his knowledge is limited to what appears on stamps.
72	20	"Lolly's Puppet Show"	12 October 2007
Lolly the Emu loses her voice on the day of the annual puppet show.
73	21	"Ned's Missing Teddy"	17 October 2007
Ned the Wombat takes Teddy on an outback adventure and realises Teddy isn't with him when Ned gets home.
74	22	"Mitzi the Flying Nurse"	18 October 2007
Mitzi the Possum uses her nursing skills to tend to some wilting plants.
75	23	"Alice Makes a Movie"	19 October 2007
Alice the Platypus decides to make a film about her friends, but Alice's forgotten to put film in the camera.
76	24	"George's Busy Day"	20 October 2007
George the Turtle has so much post to deliver that George gets in a bit of a flap.
77	25	"Alice's Night Mystery"	21 October 2007
Someone has made a mess of Alice the Platypus's kitchen and Alice decides to see if the Koala Brothers can solve the mystery.
78	26	"Mitzi's Hide and Seek"	24 October 2007
Alice the Platypus, Mitzi the Possum, and Josie the Kangaroo are playing hide and seek.
79	27	"Ned Writes a Letter"	31 October 2007
Ned the Wombat writes a letter to his favourite aunt with news of all the things Ned's been up to – but can't decide which things to include.

== Broadcast ==
In addition to the series airing on CBeebies in the United Kingdom, the series was soon expanded internationally. In May 2003, Spellbound pre-sold the series to Disney Channel in the United States to air on their Playhouse Disney block, and appointed Big Tent Entertainment as the US licensing holder for the property. Spellbound also pre-sold the series in Canada (TVOntario and Knowledge Network), Australia (ABC), and Germany (Super RTL). In 2004, the series was pre-sold in Nordic territories.

By September 2005, the series was also pre-sold in France (France 5 and Canal J), The Netherlands (Fox Kids/Jetix), Poland (Telewizja Polska) and Japan (Disney Channel).

In June 2008, BBC Worldwide picked up pay-rights to the series for Asian and African territories, and Poland for their local CBeebies networks.

In January 2012, Spellbound renewed its broadcast license with CBeebies and the then-renamed Disney Junior for them to continue broadcasting the series, the former under a six-year contract.

== Merchandise ==
On 17 April 2003, Spellbound Entertainment announced that Hasbro would be the property's master toy partner. However, this toyline would never come into fruition. Spellbound would instead sign an agreement with Mattel initially for the United States and Latin America, and later several international markets.

== Home media ==
=== United Kingdom ===
The series was initially released on VHS and DVD by Momentum Pictures through three volumes: A Letter for George in April 2004, Archie's New Home in February 2005 and Ned the Pilot in July 2005.

By 2006, Abbey Home Media had taken over distribution rights, and released three more DVD volumes: Outback Christmas in November 2006, Mitzi's Day Out in March 2007 and We're Here to Help! in October 2007.

In 2015, Clearvision released a single DVD entitled: "Alice Can't Remember and Other Stories".

=== United States ===
In the United States, Lionsgate Home Entertainment released several DVDs of the series, including "Meet the Koala Brothers!", "A Day in the Outback!", "We're Here to Help!", "Ned's Buried Treasure", "Mitzi's Big Adventure", and "Outback Christmas".

== Award nominations ==
- BAFTA Children's Awards 2006
  - Nominated for Best Animation (for the episode "The Koala Brothers Outback Christmas")
