= Simon Townsend =

Australian journalist (1945–2025)

- Simon Townsend with Woodrow on Wonderworld
- Born: Simon Patrick Townsend; 27 November 1945; Australia
- Died: 14 January 2025 (aged 79)
- Occupations: Journalist, television presenter
- Known for: Simon Townsend's Wonder World
- Children: Nadia Townsend, Michael Townsend, Lisbeth Kennelly

Simon Patrick Townsend (27 November 1945 – 14 January 2025) was an Australian journalist and television presenter. He created and hosted the children's TV show Simon Townsend's Wonder World which ran on Network 10 from 1979 to 1987.

== Biography ==
=== Early life ===
Townsend was born Simon Patrick Townsend on 27 November 1945, and lived with his family in the Sydney suburb of Watson's Bay. His father Lewis Townsend was a sub-editor for The Sydney Morning Herald. When his father died in 1955 when Townsend was aged 10, his mother established a boarding house in Bondi. In a 1983 interview, Townsend described the boarding house as "the pits" and bemoaned that they were forced to live with the "dregs of the earth". Townsend claimed he wasn't happy from the time of his father's death until he was 15 when he moved to Woy Woy. It was in Woy Woy where Townsend's journalism career began when he became a correspondent for the Central Coast Express before moving back to Sydney to become a reporter for The Sun newspaper.

=== Vietnam War opposition ===
On 4 January 1967, Townsend was fined $20 in the Special Federal Court for failing to attend a medical examination for National Service in Sydney on 11 November 1966. Townsend had lodged an application to register as a conscientious objector on 27 September 1965 but it had been refused on 6 July 1966. A subsequent appeal to the District Court was dismissed on 9 September 1966. Townsend was served with call-up papers by Commonwealth Police on 11 May 1967 requiring him to report for National Service on 25 May 1967, after his application for registration as a conscientious objector was again dismissed. On 15 May 1967, Townsend was placed into the custody of the Australian Army and fined $5 plus $2 in costs in the Federal Court, having been charged with failing to comply with two requirements under the National Service Act to attend a medical examination on 16 February 1967 and then to report to the Army on 11 March 1967. On 22 May 1967, Townsend was found guilty of having disobeyed an order from a superior officer at the South Head Army Base on 16 May 1968 when he was committed into the army, and was sentenced to 28 days detention. During his court appearance, Townsend refused to swear an oath on the Bible as he was an atheist but asked permission to take the oath using the book The Power of Non-Violence by Richard B. Gregg. When asked if he had anything to say before sentencing, Townsend said that he had been forcibly drafted against his will and against his conscience.

On 27 May, Minister for the Army Phillip Lynch admitted that Townsend had been placed on a bread and water diet while held in solitary confinement at Holsworthy Detention Centre. Townsend's fiancée Mary Jane Boscacci claimed Townsend had told her that he had been committed to solitary confinement on four charges – refusing to salute, refusing to wear a military badge, refusing to wear ammunition webbing and refusing to lay out his kit correctly. The army also denies that Townsend was being subject to psychological torture despite being deliberately woken up every half an hour during the night. The army claimed this was being done for his own welfare "to see that he has not done himself any harm or that he hadn't become claustrophobic." In an editorial, The Sydney Morning Herald described the army's actions as "monstrous" and their reasoning as a "flimsy pre-text" for them to implement a well-established Communist technique used to break down political prisoners and force confessions to crimes which they have not committed. This prompted Phillip Lynch to announce to the House of Representatives on 28 May 1968 that the Military Board had ordered an end to the practice with guards now instructed to look through the cell doors every three hours for welfare checks on prisoners. After a month of being held in detention, and following a two-year battle against his conscription, Townsend's third application for a total exemption was successful when on 14 June 1968 a magistrate ruled that Townsend had bona fide conscientious beliefs and granted an exemption from all forms of National Service.

Becoming a conscientious objector against the Vietnam War, Townsend gained national prominence on his anti-conscription stance. He later said "I suddenly decided to be a . . . objector to the Vietnam War. I then went to Sydney, I met people, I joined the groups and I read. And suddenly I had an intellectual basis for my objection to the Vietnam War. And that was when I got very busy, objecting, going to court and I ended up in Long Bay Gaol for a month. And in 1968 I ended up in the army prison for a month. I was court-martialled while I was there." For his stance, Townsend received a large amount of hate mail which included white feathers and a bullet with his name scratched on it.

== Media career ==
In 1970, Townsend joined the ABC as a reporter with the current affairs program This Day Tonight, before he joined Nine's A Current Affair in 1973. Townsend moved into radio and was appointed producer on the John Laws Morning Show on Sydney's 2UW in February 1978. While working at 2UW, Townsend collaborated with comics artist Peter Ledger to create the comic strip Wonder World featuring the character of Dr. Data, a kind knowledgeable person who had the ability to provide readers with an array of odd facts. In November 1978, Townsend and Ledger were invited by Stan Lee to the United States to discuss the viability of developing Dr. Data into a comic book.

Returning to television, Townsend developed the Wonder World concept and produced pilots for a magazine-style afternoon program aimed at children, and subsequently Simon Townsend's Wonder World commenced airing on Network 10 in September 1979. The program was a success and over 2,000 editions of the program were aired over eight years. The final edition of Simon Townsend's Wonder World! went to air on 3 September 1987. After the show ended, Townsend complained about how he had felt intimidated by the Children's Program Committee which advised the Australian Broadcasting Tribunal on matters pertaining to children's programming content. According to Townsend, their actions had blocked the program from airing a number of stories, including about the Peter Mayle book Where Did I Come From?, a segment about a Jewish Board of Deputies exhibition about The Holocaust, and a segment on special effects in movies. Townsend said the decisions caused him "the most awful agony" stating: "I fought them and I lost every time." He also recalled how Network Ten management were outraged in 1984 when he mentioned sex in a quote in The Sun-Herald when he said: "a fast cars, an appreciation of desserts and noisy sex" were ways to avoid a mid-life crisis. In April 1992, Townsend confirmed he had given permission for Wonder World to be revived, stating: it's flattering and I think it would be great if a Wonder World! program made some sort of comeback."

In September 1992, a two-hour special that Townsend had written and produced called Mystery Forces: Chance and Coincidence went to air on the Seven Network, hosted by Larry Emdur.

In 1993, building on an existing four-minute segment he had been doing for Nine's Live at 5 program, Townsend created a program for ABC TV called TVTV which he also initially hosted. It contained a mixture of interviews with television personalities promoting their shows and reviews of television shows new to the screen. Presenters included Edith Bliss (who worked previously on Simon Townsend's Wonder World), and musician James Valentine formerly of the band, Models. However, the program was poorly received by viewers and Townsend was denounced by television critics, prompting his departure from hosting the program after just six months. After he left the program, he vehemently complained about his perceived treatment during appearances on Nine's Midday and Seven's Real Life where he accused the critics of a partaking in a concerted effort to bring him down. His comments resulted in The Age's television critic Ross Warneke of accusing Townsend of having alleged "criminality", describing the accusation as "untrue" and "grossly offensive" and attempted to prompt Townsend into issuing a public apology.

In 1999, Townsend formed a production company called ZeeTee Productions with Stan Zemanek whom he had worked with at 2UW in the late 1970's to develop a range of new television shows, including a new quiz show.

== Personal life and death ==
On 3 April 1992, Townsend was involved in an altercation with a truck driver after the truck collided with the rear end of Townsend's Mercedes-Benz. The 42-year-old truck driver pleaded not guilty to negligent driving, alleging that Townsend had changed lanes dangerously as both vehicles turned into Macquarie Street in the Sydney CBD, after which Townsend left the scene of the accident. Townsend claimed he left as he had feared the truck driver may have become violent after shaking his fist in Townsend's face. The magistrate accepted Townsend's evidence and fined the truck driver $100.

Townsend suffered three strokes. In August 2005, he told ABC TV he feared the next stroke might kill him.

Townsend had two children with his wife Rosanna (1950–2003): Michael Townsend and actress Nadia Townsend, who appeared on Channel 7's City Homicide. He also had another daughter, Lisbeth Kennelly, from a previous relationship. After Rosanna's death, his partner was Kerrie Gleeson until her death in 2015.

Townsend died on 14 January 2025, at the age of 79, having recently been diagnosed with an aggressive cancer.
