= Acme School of Stuff =

Canadian children's television show

- Genre: Children's; Educational
- Presented by: David Stringer
- Country of origin: Canada

Original release
- Network: TVOntario
- Release: 1 September 1988 – 1 December 1990

The Acme School of Stuff is a half-hour Canadian children's television show which was broadcast on TVOntario between 1 September 1988 and 1 December 1990. The Acme School of Stuff was hosted by its producer David Stringer. The show primarily consisted of theory of operation on a subject or certain item at the beginning, then a field trip to a plant in the middle and following another theory of operation on some other item or subject at the end.

Notable features included:

- A Rube Goldberg machine made from devices explained on the show, as an opening scene
- Technical facts presented in a way understandable to school age children in a conversational manner
- Breaking the fourth wall by use of camera and lighting effects, and audible comments by the TV crew

The episodes have been uploaded to YouTube under the acmeschool channel.
