= Supermarket Sweep Australia =

- Created by: Al Howard
- Directed by: Adrian Dellevergin
- Presented by: Ian Turpie
- Narrated by: Col Mooney; Alan Glover
- Country of origin: Australia
- Original language: English
- No. of seasons: 3

Production
- Producer: Mark Writer
- Running time: 30 minutes
- Production company: Fremantle International

Original release
- Network: Nine Network
- Release: 10 February 1992 – 4 February 1994

Related
- Supermarket Sweep

Supermarket Sweep is an Australian version of the American game show of the same name. It was produced by Grundy Television, airing on the Nine Network from 1992 to 1994 with former Price Is Right host Ian Turpie as MC, assisted by Tania Zaetta. Col Mooney and Alan Glover served as announcers.

The supermarket on this show was originally a Coles Supermarket, but was later changed to a generic supermarket. The latter set was identical to the American show, as was the case with most Reg Grundy-produced Australian games based on American programs.

Pairs of contestants, randomly selected from the studio audience, started with one minute and are asked questions about television commercials and supermarket merchandise, with correct answers increasing their allocated time in a "shopping spree." Contestants use their allocated time to run through the mock supermarket, filling their trolleys with as much merchandise as possible. The team with the highest value of merchandise is deemed the winning team, and plays in a treasure hunt-style bonus game, in which clues suggest which four products must be found in 60 seconds. Each marked product found won a prize and finding the fourth product before 60 seconds expired won a major prize.
