= Loud (Australian TV series) =

Australian music television show (1994)

Loud is an Australian music and lifestyle television show broadcast by ABC in 1994. Aimed for ten- to seventeen-year-olds, it aired in the 5:30 pm slot on weekdays and was hosted by Michael Tunn.

== See also ==
- List of Australian music television shows
- List of Australian television series
