= Chris Gilbey =

Australian businessman (born 1946)

Chris Gilbey OAM
- Born: Christopher John Gilbey; 13 May 1946 (age 80); Islington, London, England
- Occupation: Businessman

Christopher John Gilbey OAM (born 13 May 1946, Islington) is an English-born Australian entrepreneur and music industry identity. His more recent activities are in the field of materials science and signals processing from graphene-coated materials, a long way from the career he is best known for: shaping the careers of recording artists such as INXS, Tommy Emmanuel, Keith Urban, The Church, The Saints, AC/DC, Wa Wa Nee, Euphoria, Edith Bliss and Stevie Wright. He has authored two books.

== Early years ==
Chris Gilbey was born at Whittington Hospital in North London. He attended Tollington Boys High School in Muswell Hill and subsequently The South African College School in Cape Town, South Africa. He dropped out of university and became a computer programmer for a period. He studied engineering at the University of Cape Town before returning to the UK to pursue a career in the music industry. Chris formed a pop group called Kate, which was signed to CBS Records in the UK. He co-wrote several singles by the band including its first single, "Strange Girl", which was a Melody Maker "record of the week".

After Kate disbanded in 1969, Gilbey established a leather fashion business called Woof. He designed a number of Hobbit-inspired clothes, which were sold in Carnaby Street. His suede, hooded capes came to the attention of Twiggy, who modelled them. Despite this, the venture was unsuccessful and Gilbey closed it in 1972. Gilbey migrated to Australia in November 1972.

== Music industry history ==
Gilbey joined the Australian music label Albert Productions in 1973, where he began as A&R manager and subsequently became vice-president of A&R. At Alberts, Gilbey was deeply involved in the promotion of AC/DC, including producing or designing the band's controversial radio advertisements and album covers. Gilbey's production credits with Alberts include Grahame Lowndes' "Survival's A Song", SJC Powell's "Celestial Madness" and Bartholomew John's "Someone". Gilbey also produced the single "Show and Tell" by Bobbi Marchini. After leaving Alberts, Gilbey managed the seminal Australian punk band The Saints, moving with the band to the UK.

In 1979, Gilbey returned to Australia to become managing director of ATV Northern Songs. He signed a number of artists in Australia and helped a number of songwriters who had moved overseas including Steve Kipner. He established a joint venture with EMI Records reactivating the Parlophone label as the imprint for the records that he produced. Among the artists that he signed during this period was The Church. He produced the band's first hit single, "The Unguarded Moment", and debut album, Of Skins and Heart.

Gilbey left ATV Northern Songs at the time that the company was acquired by Robert Holmes a Court, and established a venture with MCA Music. During the next eleven years Gilbey built one of the most successful independent publishing companies in Australia and signed writers such as Allan Caswell, INXS, Noiseworks, Peter Blakeley, Tommy Emmanuel, Sharon O'Neill, Shona Laing, Don Spencer and Wa Wa Nee, as well as producing hit records with The Sunnyboys and Doug Mulray.

Subsequent to this, Gilbey became the Senior Executive VP of BMG Records in Australia, and led the development of one of the first transactional music web sites as well as the development of the enhanced CD. In 1978, Gilbey, along with Peter Hebbes, Ross Barlow and Jack Argent, launched The Golden Stave Luncheon. 187 members of Australia's music industry attended the first charity event at Sydney's Sebel Townhouse in 1978. Gilbey became the founding chairman of the Golden Stave Foundation. He was founding chairman of Export Music Australia.

Gilbey received the Order of Australia Medal (OAM) in 1992 for his contribution to the music industry and charity.

== Publishing history ==
- In 1999, Bantam published Gilbey's How To Survive The Y2K Crisis In Australia, ISBN 1863251804
- In 2000, Seven Stories Press published Gilbey's MP3 And The Infinite Digital Jukebox, ISBN 1876719001

== Business history ==
Gilbey co-founded Bigfatradio.com in 2000. In 2001 was Gilbey appointed to the post of CEO of Lake Technology, an ASX-listed company with a focus on Digital Signal Processing. He led the company until its sale through a friendly takeover to Dolby Laboratories in 2005.

Following the sale, he consulted to Dolby's Consumer Division on global consumer strategy for two years. He and Dr Silvia Pfeiffer founded Vquence, a video metrics and semantic research business. Gilbey stepped down as CEO in October 2007. In 2007, Gilbey, Karl Rodrigues and Bruce Marshall founded Gilbey, Rodrigues and Marshall. The business uses the principles of crowd psychology to interpret online social networks.

In 2009, Gilbey began serving as a consultant to the ARC Centre of Excellence for Electromaterials Science based at the University of Wollongong to help develop a strategy to commercialise some of the centre's intellectual property in energy capture and conversion and medial bionics using electromaterials, 3D printing and nanotechnology. In 2010, he started teaching a course in the Arts Faculty of the University of Wollongong that set up small groups of high achieving digital communications students to work with outside organisations as a virtual digital communications consultancy. This course enabled students to transition from academia into the real world of business. He reprised the course (DIGC302) in 2011. Between 2010 and 2013 he taught in the Arts Faculty of Wollongong University to help graduating arts students understand how to transition into the workforce. He established a research project that involves science PhD candidates interviewing CEOs of companies to develop an understanding of the skills that PhD graduates need to transition into industry.

Gilbey became Entrepreneur In Residence at ARC Centre of Excellence for Electromaterials Science where he developed spin-out opportunities for the center's scientific research. He produced AdBioFab, consisting of three conferences a year bringing together industry, research and government to explore themes in 3D printing and medical bionics. In 2012 he wrote the business plan and developed the strategy for the successful spinout of a hydrogen production technology company, AquaHydrex. He was an executive director in a bio banking start up company, Cytentia.

In 2014, Gilbey co-founded Imagine Intelligent Materials Limited (originally NanoCarbon Pty Limited) and acquired a family of patents related to methodologies for producing graphene from the University of Wollongong emanating from the research of Professor Gordon Wallace and Professor Dan Li. Gilbey is Executive Chairman and CEO of Imagine Intelligent Materials Ltd.

In 2018, Gilbey co-founded the Australian Graphene Industry Association (AGIA) and remains its chairman. In that role he has called upon the Australian Government to recognize the value that graphene can deliver to Australian manufacturers.
