= Of Skins and Heart =

Studio album by The Church
- Released: 13 April 1981 (Australia); 22 January 1982 (International)
- Recorded: September−November 1980
- Studio: Studios 301 (Sydney)
- Genres: Alternative rock, post-punk, new wave
- Length: 39:47; 39:20; 39:34
- Labels: EMI Parlophone (Australia); Carrere (Europe); Capitol (US/Canada); Arista (US/Canada reissue)
- Producers: Chris Gilbey, Bob Clearmountain

The Church chronology
Of Skins and Heart (1981)	The Blurred Crusade (1982)

Singles from Of Skins and Heart
- 1. "She Never Said" Released: 13 November 1980; 2. "The Unguarded Moment" Released: 14 March 1981; 3. "Tear It All Away" Released: 13 July 1981

The Church
- 1982 European / North American release (Carrere / Capitol)

Professional ratings
Review scores
Source	Rating
AllMusic	4.5/5 stars
The Rolling Stone Album Guide	2/5 stars

Of Skins and Heart is the debut album by the Australian psychedelic rock band The Church, released in April 1981 by EMI Parlophone. It peaked at No. 22 in the Australian Kent Music Report Albums Chart.

It is their only album to feature Nick Ward on drums and has a harder, more new wave influenced sound than their later material, although Kilbey's semi-surreal lyrics are already present. It was produced by Chris Gilbey and Bob Clearmountain. Seven songs were entirely written by lead singer and bass guitarist Steve Kilbey and two were co-written with others. The first single, "She Never Said", did not chart on the Australian Kent Music Report Singles Chart. The second single, "The Unguarded Moment", was co-written with Mikella Parker, who was married to Steve Kilbey at the time. This song launched the band to success and has been their biggest hit to date. It brought early attention and significant radio play to the band, it peaked at No. 22 in Australia and No. 19 in New Zealand. The track "Is This Where You Live" became a live staple over the following years. By the time of the album's release, Ward had been replaced on drums by Richard Ploog.

The album was re-sequenced and released internationally as The Church in 1982.

== Background ==
In Sydney, in March 1980, singer, bass guitarist and songwriter Steve Kilbey bumped into guitarist Peter Koppes, an old bandmate from his Canberra days. Koppes was playing with another Canberran, drummer Nick Ward, in a Sydney band called Limazine. The three decided to form a new band, called it The Church (originally The Church of Man) and began performing. A month later, Marty Willson-Piper, originally from Liverpool, United Kingdom, came to one of their gigs and was invited to join on second guitar.

A four-song demo was recorded in Kilbey's bedroom studio. Thanks to contacts from Kilbey & Koppes' former band Baby Grande, they sent the tape to the Australian branch of publishing company ATV Northern Songs. The song "Chrome Injury" attracted the attention of managing director Chris Gilbey, who had recently formed a record production company in association with EMI Records in Australia and resurrected the Parlophone label. Gilbey signed the band, went to band rehearsals and helped shape their sound by buying Willson-Piper a 12 string Rickenbacker guitar and Koppes an Echolette tape delay. Sessions for their first album followed in late 1980 at Studios 301 in Sydney. Of the four songs originally demoed, only "Chrome Injury" was included.

The album, Of Skins and Heart, was co-produced by Gilbey and Bob Clearmountain (Bryan Adams). Seven of the nine tracks were written solely by Kilbey. The first single, "She Never Said", was released in November, but did not chart. The second single, "The Unguarded Moment", co-written with Kilbey's girlfriend Michelle Parker, was issued alongside the album in March 1981, initially only in Australia. "The Unguarded Moment" reached No. 22 on the Australian Kent Music Report Singles Chart while Of Skins and Heart achieved the same position on the related Albums Chart. To promote their releases, the band undertook their first national tour. By the time of the album's release, drummer Ward had already been replaced by Richard Ploog. He was recruited by their manager, Michael Chugg, after hearing of his reputation in Adelaide. Ploog's arrival established The Church's first stable line-up.

The first recordings by the group with Ploog were eventually released as a five-track double single / extended play, Too Fast for You in July 1981. It included the first collectively written track, "Sisters". Another track, "Tear It All Away", later released as a separate single, showed a development towards more elaborate guitar structures and what would become the signature Church sound. Their image of tight jeans and paisley shirts (many designed and made by Michelle Parker), as well as their 'jangly' guitar sound evoked comparisons to 1960s psychedelic groups, particularly The Byrds. The success of Of Skins and Heart enabled Chris Gilbey to present the release to Freddie Cannon of French label Carrere and Rupert Perry of American label Capitol. Both labels released the album in 1982, renamed as simply The Church, with slightly altered track listings including songs from Too Fast for You and using a crop of that EP's artwork for the cover. Ploog was incorrectly credited as the sole drummer on the release, despite only playing on one or three tracks, depending on the version. Capitol also released an edited single version of "The Unguarded Moment" which was a minute shorter than the original – a decision which displeased the band.

== Reception ==
Cash Box magazine said "This young Australian quartet plays a sprite brand of British new pop that recalls the early days of The Kinks and The Who. A ringing guitar sound, Ray Davies-styled vocals and some of the neatest hooks this side of Sydney make this a memorable debut release."

== Track listing ==
All songs by written by Steve Kilbey, except where noted.

1981 Australian release

Parlophone PCSO 7582

1. "For a Moment We're Strangers" – 3:57
2. "Chrome Injury" – 4:01
3. "The Unguarded Moment" (Kilbey, Michele Parker) – 4:12
4. "Memories in Future Tense" – 4:46
5. "Bel-Air" – 3:57
6. "Is This Where You Live" – 7:37
7. "She Never Said" – 3:16
8. "Fighter Pilot...Korean War" – 4:29
9. "Don't Open the Door to Strangers" (Kilbey, Willson-Piper) – 3:32

1982 European release

Carrere Records CAL130

1. "For a Moment We're Strangers" – 3:53
2. "Chrome Injury" – 4:00
3. "The Unguarded Moment" (Kilbey, Parker) – 4:12
4. "Memories in Future Tense" – 4:42
5. "Bel-Air" – 3:53
6. "Is This Where You Live" – 7:39
7. "She Never Said" – 3:16
8. "Tear It All Away" – 4:18
9. "Don't Open the Door to Strangers" (Kilbey, Willson-Piper) – 3:27

1982 North American release

Capitol Records ST-12193

1. "The Unguarded Moment" (Kilbey, Parker) – 4:17
2. "Too Fast for You" – 3:28
3. "For a Moment We're Strangers" – 3:52
4. "Tear It All Away" – 4:10
5. "Don't Open the Door to Strangers" (Kilbey, Willson-Piper) – 3:24
6. "Bel-Air" – 3:56
7. "Sisters" (Kilbey, Koppes, Willson-Piper, Ploog) – 4:05
8. "Memories in Future Tense" – 4:44
9. "Is This Where You Live" – 7:38

The album was re-sequenced and released internationally as The Church (1982) by Capitol Records in North America and Carrere Records in Europe. The 1989 CD release by Arista Records included three extra tracks: "Too Fast for You", "Tear It All Away" and "Sisters", which originally appeared on the double 7" single/extended play Too Fast for You in 1981.

2002 Australian Remaster

EMI Records 7243 5 39479 0 3

This remastered release contains all the tracks from the original Australian release in their original running order, plus a second disc containing the Too Fast for You EP and the promo videos for "The Unguarded Moment", "Bel-Air", "Too Fast for You" and "Tear It All Away".

2010 30th Anniversary Series Remaster

Second Motion Records CD-SMR-024

This remastered release contains all the tracks from the original Australian release in their original running order, and adds two bonus tracks: "In a Heartbeat" (the B-side of "She Never Said") and "Busdriver" (the B-side of "The Unguarded Moment"), both written by Steve Kilbey.

== Personnel ==
The Church members

- Steve Kilbey – lead vocals, bass guitar, keyboards
- Peter Koppes – lead guitar, slide guitar, backing vocals
- Marty Willson-Piper – electric 6 and 12 string guitars, acoustic guitars, backing vocals
- Nick Ward – drums, percussion, backing vocals
- Richard Ploog – drums & percussion on "Too Fast for You", "Tear It All Away" & "Sisters"

Production details

- Producers – Chris Gilbey, Bob Clearmountain
- Mixing – Bob Clearmountain
- Engineers – Christo Curtis, John Bee, Steve Bywaters
  - Assistants – Dave Greenberg, Gary Rindfuss, Raymond Wilhard
- Studio – Studios 301, Sydney
  - Mixed – The Power Station, New York

Art work

- Cover illustration – Mikela Uniacke (Of Skins and Heart), Paul Pattie (The Church)
- Photography – Gary Ede (Of Skins and Heart), Don Bruner (The Church)
