= Your Life on the Lawn =

Your Life on the Lawn is an Australian lifestyle television program, which screened on the Seven Network in 2003. The series transforms the homes and lives of those who have found themselves in mess and clutter. The series featured Pascall Fox, Simon Fenner and Lissanne Oliver.

== See also ==
- Space Invaders
- List of Australian television series
