= Basil Catterns =

Australian soldier, sailor and businessman

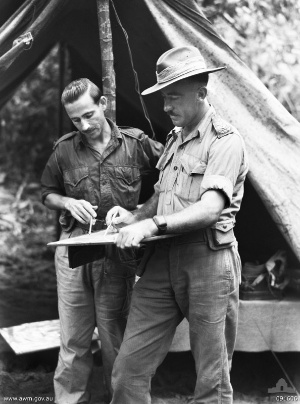
- Basil Catterns (left) in action in New Guinea, 1944
- Born: 11 August 1917; Balmain, New South Wales
- Died: 30 March 2007 (aged 89)
- Relatives: Basil G. Catterns (uncle); Angela Catterns (daughter)
- Military career
- Allegiance: Australia
- Branch: Australian Army
- Rank: Major
- Unit: 2/1st Battalion
- Conflicts: Second World War; North African Campaign; Battle of Bardia; British capture of Tobruk; New Guinea campaign; Kokoda Track campaign; Second Battle of Eora Creek; Battle of Buna–Gona; Aitape–Wewak campaign
- Awards: Military Cross; Mentioned in Despatches

Basil Wilfred Thomas Catterns, MC (11 August 1917 – 30 March 2007) was an Australian businessman, citizen soldier and amateur yachtsman.

== Early years ==
Catterns was born in Balmain, Sydney, on 11 August 1917, the son of an English merchant seaman, Wilfred Catterns, and Emily (née Greenwell). An uncle, Basil G. Catterns, for whom he was named, later became the Chief Cashier of the Bank of England.

Educated at Fort Street Boys' High School, Catterns joined the staff of the (now defunct) Sydney afternoon daily newspaper, The Sun.

== Second World War ==
On the outbreak of the Second World War in 1939 he volunteered for military service and served with the Second Australian Imperial Force (2nd AIF) in the Middle East and North Africa, including the British capture of Tobruk. When the 2nd AIF was brought back to Australia in 1942, he met Nina McKnight and later married her in 1943.

In September 1942, Catterns, by now a captain, was sent to New Guinea with the 2/1st Battalion where he saw action on the Kokoda Track, winning a Military Cross and being mentioned in despatches for acts of gallantry which his battalion commander, Lieutenant Colonel Paul Cullen, was moved to declare "the bravest thing I'd ever seen a man do". Catterns served in New Guinea for the rest of the war, eventually attaining the rank of major.

== Post-war ==
After the war Catterns pursued a career in advertising. He produced a film of the Melbourne Olympic Games; sailed the Sydney to Hobart Yacht Race on six occasions; founded Offshore Yachting, the magazine of the Cruising Yacht Club of Australia; and was one of the longest-serving members of the Sydney Maritime Museum.

Catterns and his wife lived in suburban Sydney where they raised three children: David, a barrister; Diana, an artist; and Angela, a well-known radio broadcaster and co-presenter of 'Film First' Sunday movie premieres on The World Movies Channel.

Basil Catterns died at age 89 of undisclosed causes.

== Media ==
The Catterns's story was a major thread in the documentary series Kokoda which was originally aired on ABC1 in late April 2010.
