= Scott Sims (veterinarian) =

American veterinarian and television personality

- Born: 1955; New Jersey
- Died: July 25, 2015 (aged 59–60); Kauai, Hawaii, U.S.
- Education: University of California, Davis
- Occupations: Veterinarian, television personality
- Years active: 1984–2015
- Television: Aloha Vet

Scott Sims DVM (1955 – July 25, 2015) was an American veterinarian and television personality. He is best known for his factual television series Aloha Vet, which aired in 2015.

== Early life and education ==
Sims was born in New Jersey and raised in California. He took his first equestrian lesson at 4 years old and bought his first horse, with his own money, at 7 years old.

He obtained his pilot's license shortly after graduating from high school. He graduated from University of California, Davis in 1979 with a Bachelor of Science in zoology. He then graduated from the University of California, Davis, School of Veterinary Medicine in 1984.

== Career ==
Sims was a large and small animal veterinarian. He co-founded the Davis Wildlife Care Association shortly after graduating from the University of California, Davis, School of Veterinary Medicine in 1984. He also founded a veterinary clinic, Pegasus Veterinary Clinic, in Novato, California.

In 2001, Sims and his clinic moved to Kauai, Hawaii after taking a vacation to Hawaii in 2000. Sims operated his clinic from his estate, worked primarily with two long-time employees, Dia and Ella, and saw approximately 20 patients a day. His clinic was of one of approximately 20 veterinary clinics on Kauai, but most specialized in pets and did not make house calls. While he performed most surgeries and procedures in his office, he frequently responded to emergency calls out of his office. He traveled by a specially fitted out Lexus sport utility vehicle, on an all-terrain vehicle, by horseback, or in his from-a-kit, home-built, single-engine, single-prop plane to visit sick and injured animals of all kinds on multiple Hawaiian Islands, including his home island of Kauai, Oahu, Maui, Molokai, and the Island of Hawaii (also known as The Big Island of Hawaii). He also has some clients as far away as Texas. Sims assisted the US Fish and Wildlife Service in Hawaii with injured animals. He estimated that his practice was 40% domestic pets, 50% farm animals, and 10% exotic animals.

His clinic was the subject of a Nat Geo Wild factual television series, Aloha Vet. The idea for the series was presented to Sims by the show's production company, Shine America, after he appeared in a segment of a reality show featuring professional surfer Laird Hamilton. Filming began in 2014, using a makeshift studio on his estate. The show premiered on March 21, 2015. He was in talks for a second season when he was diagnosed with bladder cancer. he died of bladder cancer on July 25, 2015,

Sims was writing a book, Eating Horses Don't Die.

== Personal life ==
Sims had no spouse or children, but did live with his grey parrot, Oliver.

He founded The Pegasus Foundation to establish a nonprofit "Pay-what-you-can" animal hospital on Kauai.
