= Classic Cars =

British car magazine

- Classic Cars, January 2016
- Editor: Phill Bell
- Frequency: Monthly
- Publisher: Bauer Media Group
- First issue: October 1973
- Country: United Kingdom
- Based in: London
- Language: English
- Website: www.classiccarsmagazine.co.uk

Classic Cars is a monthly British car magazine, focusing on buying, selling and driving classic cars. Outside of the UK, it is published as Thoroughbred & Classic Cars. The magazine was founded in October 1973 (as Classic Car) by IPC Magazines and was later acquired by Bauer Media Group.
