= Michael Tunn =

Australian radio announcer (born 1974)

Michael "Tunny" Tunn (born 18 January 1974) is an Australian radio announcer and television presenter. He was hired by Australia's national youth station Triple J in 1991 at the age of 17, making him Australia's youngest professional radio presenter at the time.

== Biography ==
Tunn was born and raised in Adelaide. He got his start in radio presenting 'Rock and Roll High School', a requests program for high school students, on Triple M. (Triple M was renamed to Three D Radio.) Triple J hired him on 25 August 1990 as part of a major change to its lineup of presenters. The decision to hire Tunn attracted a high amount of media attention. He was, however, unable to go on air at the station until he completed high school.

After completing school, Tunn moved to Sydney, where the station's studios were located and presented midnight to dawn shows over the Australian summer until be was given his own requests program, called 'J-Klub', in February 1991 when he was 17 years old.

In May 1991, he also began hosting The Afternoon Show on the ABC television station. By 1995, when Tunn was aged 21, he had presented shows on almost all of Triple J's shifts. He hosted Triple J's evening request program The Request Fest between 1992 and 1997, and was also the presenter of the Australian Broadcasting Corporation's children's TV program The Afternoon Show during the early to mid 1990s. In 1993 he hosted the documentary series Bodybeat.

Tunn quit Triple J in late 1999. At this time, he was the station's assistant music director, but was reportedly frustrated by a lack of promotion opportunities. In June 2000, he joined bigfatradio.com, an online radio station that used proprietary web page streaming technology so that the end user was able to view pages sent from the studio.

After the collapse of the venture in the Dot-Com bubble burst, he joined the Austereo network in January 2001 and became the Assistant Program Director and Afternoon Presenter of Triple M Adelaide and SAFM. In 2005, he narrated the programme Rail Around Queensland. He left Triple M on 27 March 2006 under disputed circumstances. That same year, he started his own media blog.

According to Adelaide Now, Tunn was later diagnosed as bipolar. In 2016, living off a $40 daily (Australian dollars) disability pension, the 42 year old Tunn was charged in a Coles shoplifting incident in Firle, a suburb of Adelaide. He was eventually released without conviction, fined $50, and ordered to pay $260 in levies and prosecution costs.
