= Edith Bliss =

Australian singer and television presenter

- Also known as: Edith Tanner
- Born: Eda Bliss; 28 September 1959; Brisbane, Australia
- Died: 3 May 2012 (aged 52) Sydney, Australia
- Genre: Pop music
- Occupations: Singer, television presenter

Edith Bliss (28 September 1959 – 3 May 2012) was an Australian singer and television presenter.

== Biography ==
She was born Eda Bliss in Brisbane and studied at the University of Queensland, she briefly worked as a kindergarten teacher before moving to Sydney in 1979. There she initially worked as manager of an upmarket shoe store in Bondi. In 1979, she reportedly accompanied a friend to provide moral support at a singing audition, and she was asked to also audition. She did, and won a contract with ATV Northern Publishing. Under the supervision of Chris Gilbey she began recording. Later that year she released her debut single, "If It's Love You Want", on the Grundy Organisation "GO" label, which peaked at #24 on the Australian chart. She subsequently released two more singles, "Heart of Stone" (#86 Aus) and "Two Single Beds" (#79 Aus), before releasing the album Sheer Bliss, in 1980. "If It's Love You Want", released in November 1979, was written by Allan Caswell and Brian Caswell.

On the verge of releasing a new single, written by Steve Kilbey of The Church, Bliss opted for a career in television. She was employed as a reporter on the children's series Simon Townsend's Wonder World which began in 1979. In 1984 Bliss and another reporter, Phillip Tanner, reported from Rome for Wonder World. In 1993 she was a panel member on TVTV.

Bliss later married Wonder World sound mixer, Mark Tanner; they had four children, Eden, Madison, Harrison and Lawson. In 2006, she appeared (under her married name) as a contestant on the final episode of game show Wheel of Fortune, and won. She also appeared on Where Are They Now? on the Seven Network, for a Wonder World reunion in 2006. During 2007 an appearance on Channel 9 retrospective series What a Year she would make her final TV appearance to chat about her brief music career. She died of lung cancer in 2012.
