= Angela Catterns =

Australian broadcaster (born 1953)

- Born: 30 September 1953 (age 73); Sydney, New South Wales, Australia
- Occupations: Radio & Television Presenter; podcaster; writer; sound recordist; producer; MC; speaker; narrator; voice of artist
- Years active: 1971–present
- Website: angelacatterns.com.au

Angela Catterns (born 30 September 1953) is an Australian media personality and broadcaster best known for her influential work in radio.

Over several decades she has presented Mornings on Triple J, the National Evening Show on ABC Local Radio, and Breakfast on 702 ABC Sydney. Beyond radio, she is a podcaster, writer, interviewer, MC, facilitator, narrator, and voice‑over artist. She has also co‑hosted holiday editions of the 702 ABC Sydney Breakfast program with broadcaster and humourist Wendy Harmer.

Catterns' tenure on 702 ABC Sydney was marked by a significant achievement: in 2004 she temporarily displaced prominent broadcaster Alan Jones to become Sydney’s number‑one breakfast presenter. She has also worked across commercial radio—including 2SM, Vega 95.3, and 2UE—and spent time on air at WKYS in Washington, DC. Her popularity is often attributed to her blend of intellect and warmth, her attentive interviewing style, and a voice described as “smooth as chocolate” (The Sydney Morning Herald) and "as if her vocal cords have been marinated overnight in plum brandy and golden syrup" (Elle Magazine).

In 2003, Catterns conceived the ABC 702 Knit‑In, a community event created in partnership with the charity Wrap with Love. The initiative mobilised thousands of listeners to knit blankets for people in need and has since become an annual ABC tradition. Catterns is also an ambassador and supporter of Habitat for Humanity Australia and The Public Education Foundation.

== Early career ==
After completing high school and earning a diploma in advertising from Sydney Technical College, Catterns began her career as an advertising copywriter for Hordern's and Farmers department stores, later joining the Surry Hills agency W.B. Lawrence & Partners.

Although Sydney‑born, she spent several years working in regional Australia. Her first radio announcing role was at 2LM in Lismore, New South Wales. During this period, several of her poems were published in the influential anthology Mother I’m Rooted, edited by Kate Jennings. She later moved to Orange, New South Wales, where she worked at CBN‑8 television and as a voice‑over artist for 2GZ.

After returning to Sydney, she travelled to Papua New Guinea as a sound recordist for a documentary. In 1979 she became one of the first four reporters on the Logie Award–winning children’s program Simon Townsend's Wonder World, known for its creative and occasionally hard‑hitting storytelling.

== Mid career ==
After leaving Wonder World to travel, Catterns produced the documentary Double Concerto, profiling pianist Roger Woodward and violinist Wanda Wilkomirska. The film won multiple AFI Awards and screened on ABC TV and at the New York Film Festival.

In the mid‑1980s she joined Triple J as a producer and later presenter of the morning show. A brief move to commercial radio followed, presenting mornings on 2SM before being controversially dismissed—later remarking she was told she was "too intelligent for our audience" and that "women don't like listening to other women on radio".

She then worked at SBS Television before moving to the United States, where she secured an on‑air role at top‑rating WKYS in Washington, DC.

Returning to Australia, she rejoined Triple J as the national morning show announcer during the launch of the station’s Unearthed initiative. Her interviews during this period included conversations with David Bowie, Michael Hutchence, Jeff Buckley, and prime minister Paul Keating. She later hosted Triple J's Drive program before moving to ABC Local Radio to present the national evening show from Lismore.

Catterns also freelanced extensively. During the Sydney 2000 Olympics she served as the "voice of the Olympics", delivering public announcements at Sydney Olympic Park and serving as venue announcer for gymnastics at the Superdome. She also became the voice of Qantas' pre‑flight safety announcements and continues to curate and present the long‑running in‑flight music channel Soul Food.

== 2001 to present ==
Catterns returned to ABC Local Radio in 2001, becoming the 702 ABC Sydney breakfast presenter. Her warm, intelligent style and the station's mix of music, conversation, and news helped her reach the top of the ratings in 2004.

That same year she helped establish the KNIT IN, inspired by on‑air discussions about knitting. The event quickly grew into a major annual community initiative supporting Wrap with Love.

Catterns resigned from ABC 702 in 2005 and soon joined Vega 95.3 as breakfast presenter, remaining until late 2007. She also hosted the inaugural AIR Awards in 2006.

She later reunited with Wendy Harmer to produce several podcast series—Is It Just Me?, It’s News to Me, and In the Loop—and the pair co‑hosted summer breakfast programs on 702 ABC Sydney in 2009, 2010, and 2011. Their on‑air chemistry was widely praised, with both women describing the collaboration as among the most rewarding of their careers.

In 2011 Catterns briefly stepped into management as program director at 774 ABC Melbourne. She joined 2UE in 2014 as morning presenter, remaining until the Fairfax–Macquarie merger.

In 2020 she returned to ABC Local Radio to host Saturday Breakfast on ABC North Coast and launched a national Sunday Afternoon program.

Today, Catterns continues to work as a voice‑over artist, interviewer, presenter, MC, and podcast producer. She is also the voice of the Sydney Opera House, reminding patrons to take their seats.

== Media and colleagues ==
Catterns' enduring appeal has been widely noted. Journalist Bryce Corbett praised her "smooth‑voiced sincerity" and her ability to make callers feel they are "chatting with their mate Angela". Former competitor Mike Carlton described her as "serious competition" and "very good", while ABC manager Roger Summerill called her "intelligent, entertaining, and exactly what Sydney audiences want".

Colleagues have highlighted her warmth, inclusiveness, and exceptional listening skills. Sharon Longridge described her as "sophisticated and insightful", while Steve Cannane noted her ability to draw out interview subjects rather than dominate conversations.

Catterns herself has said she values the connection with listeners and the thrill of "seeing the switchboard light up" when a topic resonates.

== Honours ==
In the 2014 Queen's Birthday Honours, Catterns was appointed a Member of the Order of Australia (AM) for "significant service to the broadcast media industry as a radio presenter, and to social welfare organisations".

== Personal life ==
Catterns is the daughter of Basil Catterns, an Australian businessman, yachtsman, and decorated soldier who received the Military Cross for bravery on the Kokoda Track. She has one child.

In a Sydney Morning Herald article, she reflected on interviewing her father during the 60th anniversary commemorations in Papua New Guinea—calling it one of the highlights of her career.

In 2002 he and nine other veterans were flown back to Papua New Guinea for the 60th anniversary of the battles along the Kokoda Track, commemorated with the unveiling of a monument at Isurava by then Prime Minister John Howard. At that time I was hosting the breakfast show on 702 ABC Sydney. It was obviously a legitimate news story, so I lined up an interview with my father ... It was one of the highlights of my career and one of those special moments that I know a lot of listeners remember.

Outside her professional life, she enjoys sailing, yoga, reading, writing, and supporting charitable causes including Habitat for Humanity.
