= Bodybeat =

Australian documentary series (1993)

Bodybeat is an Australian documentary series presented by Michael Tunn and broadcast by the ABC in 1993. It was a two-part series teenager's body images. The first part looked at females and the second males. Tunn talked to a range of people of their perceptions of peoples bodies, how it affects them and what drives those perceptions. Natalie Vlies of the Canberra Times wrote that it was "the first Australian documentary made by a teenager for teenagers."
