= The Big Breakfast (Australian TV program) =

- Genre: Breakfast Show
- Written by: Phillip Cullen
- Directed by: Phillip Cullen
- Presented by: Tim Bailey
- Country of origin: Australia
- Original language: English
- No. of seasons: 4

Production
- Executive producer: Garry Farrar
- Producers: Danielle Lass; Phillip Cullen; Garry Farrar; Andrew Niggie
- Running time: 90 minutes

Original release
- Network: Network Ten
- Release: 21 December 1992 – 5 July 1995

The Big Breakfast is an Australian children's breakfast television series presented by Tim Bailey that aired on Network Ten from 21 December 1992 until 5 July 1995. The series aired every weekday from 7:00am to 8:30am and later from 6:30am to 8:30am (same time slots as several other Australian children's breakfast television series such as Cheez TV and Agro's Cartoon Connection) and featured competitions, music videos and cartoons such as X-Men, Biker Mice from Mars, The Ren and Stimpy Show, Dungeons & Dragons, Bobby's World, The Incredible Hulk, Speed Racer, Eek! The Cat, The Transformers, The Adventures of Teddy Ruxpin, Mighty Mouse and Friends, Bionic Six, Casper and Friends, The Adventures of T-Rex, Alvin and the Chipmunks (Ruby-Spears version), Fievel's American Tails, Piggsburg Pigs!, Back to the Future, Garfield and Friends, Transformers: Generation 2, Exo-Squad, Conan the Adventurer, Peter Pan and the Pirates, Little Wizards, Bucky O'Hare and the Toad Wars!, Capitol Critters and Adventures of Sonic the Hedgehog and a few live-action shows such as the American sitcoms Bewitched and I Dream of Jeannie, the very first The Lone Ranger TV series and the American children's super hero series Superhuman Samurai Syber-Squad as well as the Australian children's wildlife series Totally Wild in which Bailey also presented.

The show ended on 5 July 1995 and was then replaced by Cheez TV another Australian children's morning series that also showed cartoons.
