= Eden Gaha =

Australian producer based in Los Angeles (born 1968)

- Born: 29 November 1968 (age 57); Sydney, Australia
- Occupations: Executive producer; television producer; director; actor; television host

Eden Gaha is an Australian producer based in Los Angeles. He is currently president of Shine America.

== Early life ==
Eden Gaha was born in Sydney and attended Newington College.

== Career ==
From 1985 to 1986, Gaha was a singer-dancer in the inaugural run of the Solid Gold show at Gold Nugget Theatre, Australia's Wonderland. He made his screen acting debut in 1989 in the Australian drama series A Country Practice and subsequently had roles in Home and Away, G.P. and Police Rescue.

In 1992, Gaha hosted the teen game show Vidiot for the Australian public broadcaster ABC. In 1996, he became a presenter on Channel 9's Animal Hospital, where he started producing his own stories. He worked on Animal Hospital for four years.

In 1999, Gaha received a Centenary of Federation grant to produce the documentary The Ties that Bind. Subsequently, a series of six half-hour documentaries was completed where prominent Australians of ethnic parents travel back to the birthplace of their ancestors. Each documentary is a personal journey of discovery to find what it means to be Australian.

In 2003, Gaha began working on Survivor (US) as supervising producer with Mark Burnett where he was nominated twice for the primetime Emmy Award. With Burnett, he worked as co-executive producer on The Apprentice, The Contender, Pirate Master and Rock Star. He completed his fifth season of Celebrity Apprentice as executive producer.

On 6 May 2011, it was announced that Gaha would be taking over the presidency of Reveille Productions from June 2011. In March 2012, Reveille became known as Shine America.

At Shine America, Gaha executive produced Masterchef, Junior Masterchef, Riot (hosted by fellow Australian compatriot Rove McManus and co-executive produced by Steve Carell), Restaurant Startup and The Biggest Loser. On 24 September 2014, it was announced that Gaha would co-produce Aloha Vet with Mike Aho for Nat Geo Wild.
