= Ross Warneke =

Australian journalist, broadcaster and television commentator

Ross Warneke (5 April 1952 – 25 August 2006) was an Australian journalist, broadcaster, and television commentator in Melbourne.

== Career ==
Warneke often acted as a substitute on Neil Mitchell's morning program on radio station 3AW. He was at the helm of the show for many big news stories, including the Port Arthur massacre and the 9/11 terrorist attack on America.

For many years, Warneke wrote a column in the Green Guide of The Age newspaper, mainly focusing on the discussion of television ratings and other television matters of the previous week.

== Death ==
On 24 August 2006, it was announced in the Green Guide that Warneke was suffering from cancer and was gravely ill. Less than 24 hours later, on 25 August 2006, Warneke died in a Melbourne hospital with his wife and son at his bedside.
