= Jono and Dano =

Australian radio and television show

The Jono & Dano Show was a radio and later television show hosted by Jonathan Coleman (Jono) and Ian Rogerson (Dano).

== Original radio programming ==
The original Jono & Dano show was broadcast on Triple J as a Saturday night show, before moving to Sunday afternoons and eventually the weekday breakfast shift. They then moved to commercial radio and presented the breakfast show at 2SM before hosting a night-time show on Sydney's Triple M in 1984.

== Television programming ==
Jono & Dano then left radio to concentrate on television with a late night show on the Seven Network, followed by morning music show Saturday Morning Live before splitting up, with Jono moving to London to continue in radio and television, and Dano returning to Triple J.

== Recent events ==
In 2008, after almost 20 years apart, Jono & Dano returned to air Monday to Friday nationally around Australia on 101.7 WSFM (Sydney), Gold 104.3 (Melbourne), 4KQ (Brisbane) and 96fm (Perth), as well as many regional stations across Australia.
