= Big Square Eye =

Australian children's game show

- Genre: Game Show
- Created by: Helena Harris
- Directed by: Stephen Jones
- Presented by: Bob La Castra
- Theme music composer: Glenn Heaton; Geoff McGarvey; MC Codeblue
- Opening theme: "It's the Big... It's the Big..."
- Ending theme: "Tell Your Friends About the Big Square Eye"
- Composer: Paul Mac
- Country of origin: Australia
- Original language: English
- No. of seasons: 2
- No. of episodes: 80

Production
- Executive producers: Claire Henderson; Robert de Young
- Producers: Stephen Jones; Helena Harris
- Production locations: Sydney, New South Wales (1991); Melbourne, Victoria (1992)
- Running time: 30 minutes

Original release
- Network: ABC
- Release: 24 June 1991 – 6 November 1992

Big Square Eye was an Australian children's game show that aired on ABC TV from 1991 to 1992, with a final repeat broadcast in 1993. It was hosted by Bob La Castra, with musician Paul Mac appearing as "Knuckles" McDermott, who handled the keyboard and sound effects. The programme aired on weekdays just after 5 pm as part of the Afternoon Show programming block.

The premise of the program was that each episode had celebrity guest judges which particular skills which they would demonstrate to the children in the audience. Contestants were selected from the audience to attempt a challenge which involved the celebrity guest's skills to their satisfaction. Guest judges included artist Ken Done, entertainer Jeanne Little, and cricketer Mark Waugh.
