= Vidiot =

- Genre: Game Show
- Directed by: Colin Bromley; Jane Pepper
- Presented by: Eden Gaha; Scott McRae
- Country of origin: Australia
- Original language: English
- No. of seasons: 4

Production
- Executive producers: Claire Henderson; Mark Barnard
- Producers: Wendy Gray; Eileen Tuohy
- Production location: Australia
- Running time: 24 minutes

Original release
- Network: ABC TV
- Release: 8 June 1992 – 20 July 1995

Vidiot is a children's/teenage television game show broadcast from 1992 to 1995 on the Australian Broadcasting Corporation. It was hosted by Eden Gaha for the first two series, then Scott McRae for the 1994 and 1995 seasons.

The game format was mostly a simple verbal question-and-answer, with slight variations such as timed rounds, visual aids, and audio aids. Questions were themed on popular teen culture, including chart music and recent films.

For each Monday to Thursday broadcast, three new teenage contestants battled to win a place for the Friday broadcast. A live audience, often consisting of fellow students from the contestants' schools, was present (although no schools were specified).

Vidiot was recorded in ABC's Sydney studios. On the east coast of Australia, it was broadcast at 5:30pm on weeknights.
