= 1995 in Australia =

- Monarch: Elizabeth II
- Governor-General: Bill Hayden
- Prime minister: Paul Keating
- Population: 17,071,758
- Elections: ACT, NSW, QLD

The following lists events that happened during 1995 in Australia.

- Decades: 1970s; 1980s; 1990s; 2000s; 2010s
- See also: 1995 in Australian television; 1995 in Australian literature; Other events of 1995; Timeline of Australian history

== Incumbents ==
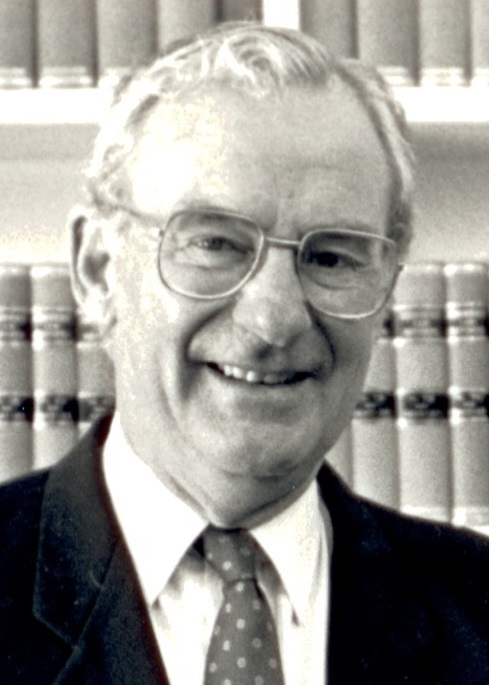
Bill Hayden

Paul Keating

- Monarch – Elizabeth II
- Governor General – Bill Hayden
- Prime Minister – Paul Keating
  - Deputy Prime Minister – Brian Howe (until 20 June), then Kim Beazley
  - Opposition Leader – Alexander Downer (until 30 January), then John Howard
- Chief Justice – Sir Anthony Mason (until 20 April), then Sir Gerard Brennan

=== State and territory leaders ===
- Premier of New South Wales – John Fahey (until 4 April), then Bob Carr
  - Opposition Leader – Bob Carr (until 4 April), then Peter Collins
- Premier of Queensland – Wayne Goss
  - Opposition Leader – Rob Borbidge
- Premier of South Australia – Dean Brown
  - Opposition Leader – Mike Rann
- Premier of Tasmania – Ray Groom
  - Opposition Leader – Michael Field
- Premier of Victoria – Jeff Kennett
  - Opposition Leader – John Brumby
- Premier of Western Australia – Richard Court
  - Opposition Leader – Jim McGinty
- Chief Minister of the Australian Capital Territory – Rosemary Follett (until 2 March), then Kate Carnell
  - Opposition Leader – Kate Carnell (until 2 March), then Rosemary Follett
- Chief Minister of the Northern Territory – Marshall Perron (until 26 May), then Shane Stone
  - Opposition Leader – Brian Ede
- Head of Government of Norfolk Island – Michael King

=== Governors and administrators ===
- Governor of New South Wales – Peter Sinclair
- Governor of Queensland – Leneen Forde
- Governor of South Australia – Roma Mitchell
- Governor of Tasmania – Phillip Bennett (until 2 October), then Guy Green
- Governor of Victoria – Richard McGarvie
- Governor of Western Australia – Michael Jeffery
- Administrator of the Australian Indian Ocean Territories – Danny Gillespie
- Administrator of Norfolk Island – Alan Kerr
- Administrator of the Northern Territory – Austin Asche

== Events ==
=== January ===
- 4 January – Chief justice of the Family Court of Australia, Alastair Nicholson calls for the law to recognise homosexual couples and their children as a family unit, stating that it was "unhelpful to attempt to set limits to what a family can be."
- 15 January – Eight members of the same family are killed in a fire at a housing commission complex in the Sydney suburb of Liverpool. Following an inquest at Glebe Coroner's Court the following year, the fire was determined to have been deliberately lit by "a person or persons unknown."
- 23 January – The Tasmanian Conservation Foundation commences court proceedings to overturn 2 of the 11 woodchip licenses issued by the Federal Government.
- 30 January – John Howard becomes federal Liberal Party leader and thus federal leader of the opposition after the resignation of Alexander Downer.

=== February ===
- 2 February – Tasmanian Premier Ray Groom defies Prime Minister Paul Keating's moratorium on logging in 72 Tasmanian coupes.
- 3 February – A 4-day blockade of Parliament House, Canberra by 300 trucks and 2,500 timber workers and supporters ends as Prime Minister Paul Keating partially backs down on his 27 January decision to freeze logging in 509 old-growth coupes.
- 8 February – It's announced Brian Johns is to be the new managing director of the Australian Broadcasting Corporation.
- 13 February – 2,000-strong rally at Sydney Airport causes disruption.
- 16 February –
  - Media magnate Kerry Packer appears on A Current Affair on his own Nine Network to attack cross-media ownership, and speaks of John Howard as prime minister material.
  - Federal Opposition Leader John Howard promises to woo "the battlers", traditional Labor voters hurt by Labor's policies, and "demonstrate that our policies are not antagonistic to them".
- 17 February – Prime Minister Paul Keating attacks John Howard as a "political blancmange" and a "political chameleon".
- 18 February – Elections in the Australian Capital Territory replace the minority Australian Labor Party government of Rosemary Follett and elect a minority Liberal Party government of Kate Carnell.
- 26 February – Former Liberal Party leader John Hewson announces his resignation from federal parliament.

=== March ===
- 10 March –
  - Ian McLachlan resigns his shadow portfolio of Environment for having misled Parliament over the opening of secret Aboriginal women's documents relating to the proposed construction of a bridge to Hindmarsh Island, South Australia.
  - The New South Wales Government announces seven new parks and reserves, adding 6,000 hectares to the New South Wales National Parks estate.
- 18 March – The campaign to save Tasmania's Tarkine wilderness achieves success a week after the arrest of Australian Conservation Foundation executive director Tricia Caswell for trespass when Australian Heritage Commission chair Wendy McCarthy announces its interim listing for May.
- 25 March –
  - Bob Carr leads the Labor Party to victory in the New South Wales state election, deposing the Liberal/National coalition government of John Fahey that had been in power since 1988. Labor scraped in with a 2.2% swing and 50 of the 99 seats.
  - Liberal candidate Brendan Smyth wins the 1995 Canberra by-election with a 16% swing, a formerly safe Labor seat occupied by Ros Kelly.

=== April ===
- 4 April –
  - New South Wales Premier Bob Carr assumes the Arts and Ethnic Affairs portfolio and Deputy Premier Andrew Refshauge assumes Health and Aboriginal Affairs.
  - Peter Collins replaces John Fahey as New South Wales Liberal leader. Ron Phillips beats incumbent Kerry Chikarovski as Deputy Leader by 19–10.
- 8 April – The 1995 Wentworth by-election is held, triggered by the resignation of former Liberal leader John Hewson. The by-election is won by Liberal candidate Andrew Thomson but with no Labor candidate, Greens candidate Murray Matson attracts a record 27% of first preference votes, polling ahead of Bill Wentworth - a former Liberal member for Mackellar who runs as an independent candidate.
- 11 April – The Council of Australian Governments (COAG) meeting is held. The assembled Premiers and territory leaders endorse a program of reforms envisaged by Professor Fred Hilmer's National Competition Policy Review.
- 24 April - The $5 note replaced the original polymer note after the pale colour was similar to the $10 note and purple is the banknote's new colour.
- 28 April – Rob O'Regan retires after 3 years at the helm of the Criminal Justice Commission (CJC) in Queensland, critical of poor standards of conduct among many politicians.

=== May ===
- May – The Australian Grand Prix is moved from Adelaide to Melbourne after the Premier of Victoria spends what is reported to be quite a large amount on securing the rights to the race from 1996 onwards. Protests ensue about what many saw as the turning of public parkland into a private racetrack.
- 9 May – The Federal Budget is delivered. The Budget's enormous turnaround in projected revenue, from a deficit of $12.9 billion to a small surplus, is received with scepticism by many commentators.
- 30 May – Dorothy Davis disappears. Believed murdered, her remains had not been located as of 4 August 2016, when the man convicted of her murder dies.

=== June ===
- June–July – Qantas is privatised.
- 7 June – Prime Minister Paul Keating announces to Parliament that Australia would have a referendum on the republic with a head of state elected by Parliament by a majority of at least two-thirds.
- 8 June – The Tasmanian Labor Party and unions reach a historic agreement to overturn the Groom industrial relations regime if Labor wins office.
- 20 June – The Federal Labor Caucus selects Kim Beazley to replace Brian Howe who unexpectedly stepped down as deputy leader.
- 29 June – Australian Democrats leader Cheryl Kernot launches the Democrats' "Keeping the Senate Strong" campaign, attacking the "anarchical" Greens.
- 30 June – Minister for Administrative Services Frank Walker announces that both the Aboriginal flag and the Torres Strait Islander flag have been proclaimed as official flags of Australia.

=== July ===
- 1 July – Telecom Australia changes its domestic trading name to Telstra.
- 15 July – The 1995 Queensland state election produces a hung Parliament, with Labor holding a one-seat majority over the Liberal/National coalition, as well as suffering a 7% swing and the loss of 9 seats.
- 17 July – The West Australian Government's Royal Commission into former West Australian Premier Carmen Lawrence's role in the Easton affair opens in Perth, Western Australia, an inquiry earlier labelled by Prime Minister Paul Keating as a "flagrant abuse of the judicial system".
- 25 July – The count in Mundingburra is complete following the Queensland state election. Labor wins by 16 votes with the party claiming a one-seat victory (45 seats), the Nationals winning 29 seats, the Liberals winning 14 seats and 1 independent also winning a seat.

=== August ===
- 2 August – A combined Queensland Opposition Coalition frontbench is announced, with Joan Sheldon as Deputy Leader and Shadow Treasurer.
- 4 August – Federal Opposition Leader John Howard expels Noel Crichton-Browne from the Federal Liberal party room.
- 7 August – A second West Australian Federal MP, Allan Rocher leaves the Liberal Party to sit as an Independent, following the bitter power struggle in the West Australian branch.
- 16 August – New South Wales Premier Bob Carr concedes that his pre-election promise to lift the tolls on the M4 and M5 tollways in western Sydney would be abandoned as being impossibly expensive.
- 25 August – Labor's National Executive bans ALP members from associating with the right-wing Australian League of Rights. When maverick Kalgoorlie MP Graeme Campbell persists in his association and espousal of anti-immigration views embarrassing to the party, his pre-selection is later revoked causing him to resign.
- 31 August – The cast bronze statue of the dog Larry La Trobe situated on the northern end of Melbourne's City Square is stolen.
- 1 to 31 August – Sydney's official Observatory Hill weather station records its driest and only rainless month since records began in 1859. At the close of the month the city had gone 46 days without measurable rain, twelve more than the previous record from 1970 and 1975.

=== September ===
- 8 September – Noel Crichton-Browne is expelled from the Liberal Party.
- 13 September – The Queensland Government abandons the controversial Eastern Tollway to link Brisbane with the Gold Coast, having lost 4 seats in the affected area.

=== October ===
- 11 October – John Fahey is selected as Liberal candidate for the marginal seat of Macarthur.
- 19 October – South Australian Democrat and former leader Senator John Coulter resigns due to ill health, warning Cheryl Kernot that the party risked losing votes by becoming too mainstream. Coulter is replaced by former student activist and party worker Natasha Stott Despoja who is sworn in on November 30.
- 20 October – Brenda Hodge, the last person to be sentenced to death in Australia before the full abolition of capital punishment, is paroled from prison after serving eleven years of a life sentence.
- 24 October – Anna Wood, a 15-year-old schoolgirl from Sydney, dies after taking ecstasy at a rave. Her death sparks a media firestorm and a national debate over the use of illicit drugs.

=== November ===
- November – The rabbit calicivirus disease (RCD) escapes from an island testing station in South Australia & quickly spreads into Victoria and New South Wales.It is estimated that the feral rabbit population would be permanently reduced by 60%.
- 1 November – Federal Opposition Leader John Howard attempts to mend relations with the Asian community, telling Chinese business people in Melbourne how he values their commercial networks.
- 3 November- After a six-month trial, David Harold Eastman is convicted by a jury of the assassination of Australian Federal Police Assistant Commissioner Colin Winchester. He is sentenced to life imprisonment and can only be released by approval of the ACT parliament, Federal Parliament and the Governor-General.
- 7 November – The Federal Court of Australia rules against Minister Tickner's ban on the building of a bridge to Hindmarsh Island in South Australia.
- 14 November – Commissioner Marks delivers his final report, damning Carmen Lawrence's role in the Easton affair, the weight of her colleagues' evidence being against her version.
- 15 November – Legislation decriminalising owning or working in a brothel is passed by the New South Wales Legislative Council, thereby fulfilling the recommendations of the Wood police corruption inquiry.
- 26 November – The Australian Women's Party is launched in Brisbane, Queensland by a group which includes disenchanted Labor women.

=== December ===
- 1 December – A new licence for a trial shipment of 200,000 tonnes of woodchips to Taiwan reignites plans for a "Son of Wesley Vale" pulp mill for northern Tasmania.
- 3 December – The Anzac Bridge in Sydney is opened to traffic.
- 4 December – A gas explosion at Kogarah railway station in Sydney kills two people.
- 7 December – A full bench of the Federal Court of Australia rejects Robert Tickner's appeal against their 7 November ruling.
- 8 December – In the Court of Disputed Returns, Mr. Justice Brian Ambrose orders a by-election in Mundingburra after finding some 22 soldiers serving in Rwanda had effectively been disenfranchised in the 1995 Queensland state election.
- 10 December – Tasmanian Premier Ray Groom hands back to Tasmania's indigenous people 12 sacred and cultural sites totalling 3,800 hectares in an historic ceremony at Kidson Cove.
- 15 December – The Queensland Labor Party replaces former member and current candidate for Mundingburra Ken Davies with Townsville mayor Tony Mooney, provoking a voter backlash.
- 21 December – South Australian Royal Commissioner, Iris Stevens finds that Aboriginal women had "fabricated" beliefs on which they grounded opposition to the building of the Hindmarsh bridge.

== Arts and literature ==
- Helen Demidenko wins the Miles Franklin Award for The Hand That Signed the Paper

== Film ==
- Angel Baby
- Babe
- Hotel Sorrento

== Television ==
- 30 January – Today Tonight debuts on the Seven Network. Unlike its rival, the Nine Network's nationally networked A Current Affair, five separate state editions of Today Tonight are produced.
- 18 February – Hey Hey It's Saturday returns, and airs for the first time without Ernie Carroll's Ossie Ostrich who retired at the end of 1994.
- 20 September – Optus Vision is launched, signaling the arrival of pay television in Australia.
- 23 October – Foxtel is launched
- 27 June – Kerry Stokes becomes chairman of the Seven Network after reaching 20% ownership of the company following the resignation of Ivan Deveson and Bob Campbell.
- July – Cheez TV begins on the Ten network. It later became a huge hit and eventually made Agro's Cartoon Connection end in 1997.
- STW-9 is purchased by Sunraysia Television after a fierce bidding war with WIN Television.

== Sport ==
- 1 January – Isabelle Autissier is rescued by a helicopter dispatched from HMAS Darwin, after having spent four days adrift due to severe damage her vessel sustained while competing in the 1994-95 BOC Challenge approximately 900 nautical miles south of Adelaide.
- 2 March – First day of the Australian Track & Field Championships for the 1994–1995 season, which are held at the ES Marks Athletics Field in Sydney. The men's 10,000 metres events were conducted in conjunction with the Zatopek Meet at Melbourne on 15 December 1994.
- 10 March – The 1995 ARL season commences with the newly-founded North Queensland Cowboys and Auckland Warriors, as well as the previously-founded Western Reds and South Queensland Crushers, all making their debut bringing the total number of clubs to 20.
- 5 February – The Super League war begins.
- 31 March – News Limited's Super League initiates lightning raids across the country to sign players on vastly inflated contracts. The Kerry Packer backed ARL responds by signing 50 players onto equally inflated contracts on 3 April.
- 7 May – Melbourne Knights dispel their tag of chokers by upsetting defending champions Adelaide City 2–0 in the NSL Grand Final at Hindmarsh Stadium.
- 15 May – The Paul Vautin-coached Maroons win the opening game of the 1995 State of Origin series State of Origin match 2–0 at the Sydney Football Stadium. The win is all the more amazing as the team is made up largely of relatively unknown players, thanks to most star players having signed with Super League.
- 8 June – Angela Iannotta scores Australia's very first FIFA Women's World Cup goal when the Matildas play China during the 1995 FIFA Women's World Cup in Sweden.
- 9 July – Manly-Warringah set a record of fifteen consecutive wins to open an NSWRL/ARL season.
- 16 July – Rod de Highden wins the men's national marathon title, clocking 2:13:58 in Brisbane, while Julie Rose claims the women's title in 2:38:44.
- 2 September – The Sturt Football Club completes the longest winless season in the history of major Australian rules leagues, with a record of 0–22 and a minimum losing margin of 24 points.
- 24 September – The Canterbury Bulldogs (playing as the Sydney Bulldogs) defeat the minor premiers Manly-Warringah Sea Eagles 17–4 to win the 88th NSWRL/ARL premiership. The grand final marks Terry Lamb's final game and the final time the Winfield Cup is presented due to the pending ban on tobacco sponsorship. The debuting North Queensland Cowboys finish in last position, claiming the wooden spoon.
- 25 September – Opening arguments are heard in the ARL/SL case in the Federal Court, which will decide the future of rugby league in Australia.
- 30 September – The Carlton Blues (21.15.141) defeat the Geelong Football Club (11.14.80) to win the 99th VFL/AFL premiership. It is a record 16th premiership for Carlton.
- 3 October – International rugby league representative forward Ian Roberts became the first high-profile Australian sports person and first rugby footballer in the world to come out to the public as gay.
- 12 November – After 10 years, the last Australian Grand Prix on the Adelaide Street Circuit takes place with Damon Hill of the Williams team winning. The race moves to Albert Park in Melbourne from 1996 onwards.

== Births ==
=== January ===
- 5 January – Bianca Censori, model
- 6 January – Paul Izzo, footballer
- 13 January – Brianna Davey, soccer and football player
- 15 January
  - Christopher Cristaldo, footballer
  - Liam Knight, rugby league player
- 16 January – Mikaela Turik, cricketer
- 18 January
  - Jack Miller, motorcycle racer
  - Dylan Murnane, footballer
- 21 January – Alanna Kennedy, soccer player
- 24 January – Callan McAuliffe, actor
- 26 January – Jordan Drew, footballer
- 31 January – Taylor Corry, swimmer

=== February ===
- 11 February – Alex Haas, canoeist
- 18 February – Mitchell Oxborrow, British-born soccer player

=== March ===
- 20 March – Jack Bird, rugby league player

=== April ===
- 4 April – Jacob Melling, soccer player
- 8 April – Christopher Gligor, footballer
- 11 April – Sarah Mason, New Zealand-born surfer
- 12 April – Angela Donald, artistic gymnast
- 21 April
  - Matt Crouch, footballer
  - Tiana Mangakahia, basketball player (d. 2025)
- 25 April – Scott Galloway, footballer
- 27 April – Nick Kyrgios, tennis player

=== May ===
- 4 May – Chris Ikonomidis, footballer
- 5 May
  - James Connor, diver
  - Anthony Spanos, actor
- 11 May – Erinn Walters, athlete

=== June ===
- 4 June – Troye Sivan, singer-songwriter and actor
- 15 June
  - Ben Garuccio, footballer
  - Arthur Sissis, motorcycle racer
- 18 June – Olia Burtaev, swimmer
- 23 June – Eva Lazzaro, actress
- 30 June – Jai Opetaia, boxer

=== July ===
- 5 July – Torita Isaac, athlete
- 6 July – Brooklee Han, American-born figure skater
- 12 July – Evania Pelite, rugby union player
- 13 July – Dante Exum, basketball player
- 28 July – Josh Addo-Carr, rugby league player

=== August ===
- 14 August – Montaigne, singer
- 19 August – Dylan Phythian, rugby league player

=== September ===
- 14 September – Anton de Pasquale, motor racing driver
- 15 September – Awer Mabil, Kenya-born footballer
- 25 September – Todd Hazelwood, motor racing driver
- 26 September – Kyle Laybutt, rugby league player
- 29 September – Yolane Kukla, swimmer

=== October ===
- 3 October – Jay Andrijic, tennis player
- 7 October – Tiffany Eliadis, soccer player
- 12 October – Stefan Mauk, footballer

=== November ===
- 1 November – Nick D'Aloisio, entrepreneur, computer programmer and designer
- 7 November – Michael Dameski, actor, dancer and singer
- 23 November – Brittany Broben, diver
- 29 November – Liv Hewson, actress and playwright

=== December ===
- 2 December – Joe Stimson, rugby league player
- 20 December – Feliks Zemdegs, speedsolver
- 22 December – Holly Ferling, cricketer

== Deaths ==
- 13 January – Max Harris, 74, poet and author
- 26 January – Ian Tomlinson, 58, triple and long jumper
- 2 February – Fred Perry, 85, British tennis player
- 5 March – Gregg Hansford, 42, motorcycle and touring car racer
- 6 March – Olive Zakharov, 75, ALP senator
- 11 March – Isabel Letham, 95, Australia's first surfer
- 29 March – Antony Hamilton, 42, actor, model and dancer
- 2 April – Trevor Ashmore Pyman, diplomat
- 24 April – Stanley Burbury, 85, 21st Governor of Tasmania
- 27 April – Peter Wright, 78, British MI5 officer and author of Spycatcher
- 12 May – Len Beadell, 72, explorer and roadbuilder
- 17 May – Frank Knopfelmacher, 72, philosopher
- 12 June – Sir Talbot Duckmanton, 73, ABC general manager (1965–82)
- 26 June – John Jefferson Bray, 82, SA Supreme Court judge
- 22 July – Harold Larwood, 90, English cricketer
- 2 August – Fred Daly, 82, ALP politician
- 8 August – Harold Stewart, 78, poet and author
- 10 August – Ray Whittorn, politician (b. 1911)
- 17 August – Ted Whitten, 62, AFL player
- 18 August – Philip Hodgins, 36, poet
- 27 August – Dick Bentley, 88, comedian and actor
- 30 August – Dame Pattie Menzies, 94, wife of Prime Minister Sir Robert Menzies
- 24 October – Anna Wood, 15, victim of water intoxication after taking ecstasy
- 26 October – John Sangster, 66, jazz musician
- 1 November – Sir James Ralph Darling, 96, headmaster of Geelong Grammar School and chairman of the ABC
- 10 November – Jim Willis, 85, botanist
- 5 December – Gwen Harwood, 75, poet
- 8 December – Arthur John Birch, 80, organic chemist
- 12 December – Andrew Olle, 48, television and radio broadcaster

== See also ==
- 1995 in Australian television
- List of Australian films of 1995
