= List of Australian films of the 1990s =

This is a chronological list of Australian films by decade and year for the 1990s. For a complete alphabetical list, see Category:Australian films.

A list of films produced in Australia by year during the 1990s, in the List of Australian films.

== 1990 ==
- List of Australian films of 1990

== 1991 ==
- List of Australian films of 1991

== 1992 ==
- List of Australian films of 1992

== 1993 ==
- List of Australian films of 1993

== 1994 ==
- List of Australian films of 1994

== 1995 ==
- List of Australian films of 1995

== 1996 ==
- List of Australian films of 1996

== 1997 ==
- List of Australian films of 1997

== 1998 ==
- List of Australian films of 1998

== 1999 ==
- List of Australian films of 1999
