= 1996 in Australian television =

== Events ==
- Australian television celebrates its 40th birthday with celebrations lasting throughout the year. The actual birthday was on 16 September.
- Jessica Rowe joins Ten News Sydney in January to co-anchor with Ron Wilson for the next nine years.
- 1 January – To celebrate the start of the new year, ABC-TV debuts a series of new idents featuring people doing various activities using inspiration and fun. As they do so, they draw the ABC's logo. The logo then fades before the video fades to black and the words "it's your abc" appear.
- 5 February – American legal drama series JAG makes its debut on the Seven Network at 7:30 pm.
- 12 February - Midday With Kerri-Anne begins on Nine Network at 12:00 pm. It marks the return of the traditional variety format to the Midday brand, with Kerri-Anne Kennerley taking over from last year's co-hosts Tracy Grimshaw and David Reyne.
- 12 February – More tributes to Hey Hey It's Saturday's talent quest Red Faces continue with The Best and Worst of Red Faces No. 7 on Nine Network at 7:30 pm featuring more acts prior to 1995.
- 12 February – Nine Network's new Australian police drama Water Rats debuts at 8:30 pm with a two-hour episode starring Colin Friels, Catherine McClements, Sophie Heathcote and Aaron Jeffery.
- 16 February – A brand new state-based news and currents affairs program titled Stateline premieres on ABC at 6:00 pm and was shown every Friday evening. The show focus on issues concerning different states of Australia.
- 19 February – Blinky Bill returns to the ABC for a brand new series titled Blinky Bill's Extraordinary Excursion at 4:30 pm. The series follows the adventures of Blinky and the gang who were lost while on an excursion and helping other animals in a situation while trying to find their way back to Greenpatch.
- 18 March – 40 Years of Television airs on the Seven Network, hosted by entertainers Garry McDonald and Magda Szubanski.
- 20 March – American sitcom 3rd Rock from the Sun debuts on the Seven Network.
- April – Constable Wayne Patterson, portrayed by Grant Bowler, is killed in a car crash on the Blue Heelers episode An Act of Random Violence. Bowler departed the series.
- 3 April – The Ferals return to the ABC with a five-minute sequel series titled Feral TV at 5:25pm. The series also introduces new characters such as Kerry the Cane Toad and Rodney the Cockroach and follows the mischievous animals and their mishaps at a pirate television station.
- 13 May - WIN Television reintroduces its Albury Local News Bulletin nine months after it was axed.
- 15 May – DIC's Sailor Moon premiered on the Seven Network as part of Agro's Cartoon Connection.
- June – Liz Hayes quits the Today Show after 11 years and joins the 60 Minutes team, Tracy Grimshaw replaces Hayes on Today to co-host for the next nine years before leading up to A Current Affair from 2006 onwards.
- 3 June – Australian children's comedy series The Genie from Down Under a co-production between ACTF, the ABC (Australia) and the BBC (UK) begins screening on ABC every Monday at 5:00 pm.
- 17 June – Iconic British 1970s sitcom Fawlty Towers returns to air on the ABC again after being shown on commercial free for air television on Seven Network.
- 12 July – After 12 years John Burgess is sacked as host of Wheel of Fortune. The following Monday, former Sale of the Century quizmaster, Tony Barber returns to TV and begins hosting a failed run which lasts for the remainder of the year. WOF relocates from Adelaide to Sydney during this time. Wheel of Fortune was nearly cancelled at the end of 1996 after dismal ratings, but the show continued its long run instead.
- 18 July – Australian long running children's television series Play School celebrates its 30th birthday with a one-hour special on ABC at 4:00 pm.
- 30 July – British sitcom Father Ted premieres on the Nine Network.
- August – After a stand-off over who would air the show first with Seven owning the rights to the first season and Nine the subsequent seasons, despite Seven not renewing the Warner Bros. output deal, the first season of Friends screens on the Seven Network, almost two years after it premiered in the United States. Season two begins on the Nine Network in December.
- 15 August - In Neighbours, Karl Kennedy's surgery explodes.
- 14 September - Sale Of The Century begins its 40 years of television celebrity challenge special, then at 8.30pm the two hour special 40 Years Of Television — The Reel History goes to air on the Nine Network.
- 18 September - The Nine Network at 8.30pm airs another 40th Anniversary tribute special to Australian Television 40 Years Of Television — Then And Now, presented by Don Lane.
- 19 September – 1.9 million watch Kerri-Anne Kennerley and treasurer Peter Costello dancing the "Macarena" live on the Midday Show.
- 27 September - In Neighbours, Cheryl Stark dies.
- 17 November – The 1993 film Jurassic Park premieres on the Seven Network.
- 22 November - After a short-lived run in its 1.00pm timeslot, reruns of the drama Prisoner airs for the last time on Network Ten. The following January, the Seven Network picked up the soap, which still airs all 692 episodes of reruns to this present day.
- 1 December – Grant Piro presents the final episode of Couch Potato for 1996 on ABC with reruns of the Australian children's educational TV series Lift Off and the American children's mystery TV series Ghostwriter. This also marks his very last day as presenter of the series since 1991.
- 10 December – Final episode of the Australian drama series G.P. screens on ABC.
- 28 December – American animated series Dexter's Laboratory premieres on the Seven Network. It was also the very first Cartoon Cartoon to air in Australia.
- The original 1987 Teenage Mutant Ninja Turtles cartoon series airs on Australian television for the very last time on the Seven Network. It didn't return to air in Australia until the early 2010s where it was then aired on Network Ten's sister digital network Eleven.

=== New channels ===
- 8 June – Disney Channel
- 14 June – ARC Music TV
- 30 June – The Comedy Channel
- 2 August – Nightmoves

== Debuts ==
=== Domestic ===
Program	Channel	Debut date
Pacific Drive	Nine Network	29 January
Water Rats	Nine Network	12 February
Who Dares Wins	Seven Network	14 February
Stateline	ABC	16 February
Blinky Bill's Extraordinary Excursion	ABC	19 February
Naked: Stories of Men	ABC	3 March
Time Masters	Seven Network	1 April
Feral TV	ABC	3 April
Good News Week	ABC	19 April
S'Cool Sport	ABC	20 April
Recovery	ABC	20 April
Sweat	Network Ten	20 April
Mercury	ABC	2 May
Australian Story	ABC	29 May
Crocadoo	Nine Network	31 May
Where You Find the Ladybird	Network Ten	1 July
Sun on the Stubble	ABC	14 July
Animal Hospital	Nine Network	30 July
The Silver Brumby	Network Ten	3 August
The Music Shop	Network Ten	5 August
The Adventures of the Bush Patrol	Seven Network	1 September
Medivac	Network Ten	10 September
Twisted Tales	Nine Network	2 December
Bananas in Pyjamas: Singing Time	ABC	16 December
In Pit Lane	C31 Melbourne	1996
House Gang	SBS	1996

=== International ===
Program	Channel	Debut date
(United States) LAPD: Life on the Beat	Network Ten	5 January
(Canada) Road to Avonlea	Network Ten	6 January
(United States) The Mask	Seven Network	6 January
(United States) The Wizard of Oz	Network Ten	6 January
(United States) / (France) Creepy Crawlers	Network Ten	12 January
(United Kingdom) Cadfael	Nine Network	13 January
(United Kingdom) Travels A La Carte	SBS	13 January
(United Kingdom) Goggle-Eyes	ABC	17 January
(United States) The Critic	Network Ten	18 January
(Japan) Button Nose	Network Ten	20 January
(United Kingdom) Teenage Health Freak	ABC	22 January
(United Kingdom) In the Company of Men	ABC	22 January
(United States) Central Park West	Nine Network	23 January
(United States) King Arthur and the Knights of Justice	Network Ten	27 January
(United States) Dumb and Dumber	Seven Network	3 February
(United States) Cro	ABC	4 February
(United Kingdom) The All New Alexei Sayle Show	ABC	5 February
(United States) JAG	Seven Network	5 February
(United Kingdom) The Biz	ABC	9 February
(United States) Hudson Street	Network Ten	11 February
(United States) / (Japan) The New Adventures of Speed Racer	Network Ten	11 February
(United Kingdom) Pirates	ABC	11 February
(United Kingdom) Spender	Network Ten	15 February
(United Kingdom) The Baldy Man	Network Ten	1 March
(United Kingdom) Pride and Prejudice (1995)	ABC	3 March
(United States) Phantom 2040	Seven Network	9 March
(United Kingdom) / (Republic of Ireland) The Hanging Gale	ABC	14 March
(United States) Extreme	Network Ten	16 March
(United States) Hawkeye	Seven Network	19 March
(United States) 3rd Rock from the Sun	Seven Network	20 March
(United States) Ned and Stacey	Network Ten	20 March
(United Kingdom) Mortimer and Arabel	ABC	5 April
(United States) Yogi the Easter Bear	Seven Network	5 April
(Canada) Happy Birthday Bunnykins	Seven Network	5 April
(United States) Little Mouse on the Prairie	Network Ten	6 April
(Canada) Stickin' Around (minisodes)	ABC	12 April
(United States) Sliders	Network Ten	12 April
(United Kingdom) Out of the Blue	Seven Network	13 April
(United States) Tales from the Crypt	Seven Network	13 April
(United States) The Maxx	SBS	13 April
(United Kingdom) The Choir	ABC	14 April
(United States) Star Trek: Voyager	Nine Network	16 April
(United States) American Gothic	Network Ten	17 April
(United States) Mrs. Piggle Wiggle	Network Ten	19 April
(United Kingdom) Bugs	Seven Network	19 April
(United States) Street Sharks	Network Ten	20 April
(United Kingdom) Elidor	ABC	28 April
(United States) The New Adventures of Madeline	ABC	1 May
(United Kingdom) Monty	ABC	1 May
(United States) VR.5	Seven Network	2 May
(United States) Flipper (1995)	Network Ten	4 May
(United Kingdom) The Thin Blue Line	ABC	6 May
(United States) Murder One	Seven Network	13 May
(Japan) Sailor Moon	Seven Network	16 May
(Canada) Madison	ABC	17 May
(United States) Shelley Duvall's Bedtime Stories	Network Ten	17 May
(United States) Aaahh!!! Real Monsters	ABC	29 May
(United States) / (New Zealand) Hercules: The Legendary Journeys	Network Ten	1 June
(United Kingdom) / (Australia) The Genie From Down Under	ABC	3 June
(United States) The Single Guy	Network Ten	6 June
(United Kingdom) TV World: Time Traveller	SBS	16 June
(United States) Cracker (USA)	Seven Network	20 June
(United Kingdom) Kavanagh QC	ABC	21 June
(Canada) Mysterious Island	Nine Network	22 June
(United Kingdom) Hamish Macbeth	ABC	23 June
(United Kingdom) Postman Pat and the Tuba	ABC TV	25 June
(United States) / (United Kingdom) / (Germany) Secret Life of Toys	ABC	1 July
(France) Insektors	ABC	1 July
(United States) Fudge	Network Ten	8 July
(United States) Winnetka Road	Network Ten	9 July
(United Kingdom) / (Wales) Gogs	ABC	12 July
(United States) Action Man (1995)	Network Ten	12 July
(United States) The Amazing Live Sea Monkeys	ABC	17 July
(United States) The Marvel Action Hour	Network Ten	20 July
(United Kingdom) Just William	ABC	21 July
(United States) The Secret World of Alex Mack	ABC	22 July
(United States) The Brain: Our Universe Within	SBS	28 July
(United Kingdom) Cardiac Arrest	ABC	29 July
(United Kingdom) / (Republic of Ireland) Father Ted	Nine Network	30 July
(United States) The Langoliers	Network Ten	31 July
(United States) The Jeff Foxworthy Show	Network Ten	3 August
(United Kingdom) My Good Friend	ABC	3 August
(United States) Friends	Seven Network	4 August
(Germany) The Swine	SBS	5 August
(United States) Almost Perfect	Seven Network	5 August
(France) Mot	ABC	5 August
(United Kingdom) The Final Cut	ABC	16 August
(United States) Tom Clancy's Op Center	Seven Network	18 August
(United States) Kirk	Nine Network	20 August
(United States) The Women of Brewster Place	Seven Network	25 August
(United States) What-a-Mess (USA)	ABC	29 August
(United States) Jim Henson's Animal Show	Seven Network	31 August
(United States) JFK: Reckless Youth	Seven Network	31 August
(United Kingdom) Black Hearts in Battersea	ABC	1 September
(United Kingdom) / (Wales) Operavox: The Animated Operas	ABC	1 September
(United States) VR Troopers	Network Ten	2 September
(United Kingdom) Postman Pat and the Barometer	ABC	12 September
(United States) Something Wilder	Nine Network	16 September
(United States) Double Rush	Seven Network	25 September
(United States) Malibu Shores	Network Ten	29 September
(United States) Court TV: Inside America's Courts	Nine Network	30 September
(United States) Savannah	Network Ten	8 October
(United Kingdom) William's Wish Wellingtons	ABC	22 October
(United States) New York Daze	Nine Network	30 October
(United States) Bump in the Night	ABC	5 November
(United States) M.A.N.T.I.S.	Network Ten	20 November
(United Kingdom) Silent Witness	ABC	22 November
(United States) Lonesome Dove: The Series	Nine Network	25 November
(United States) Taxicab Confessions	Network Ten	26 November
(United States) Earthworm Jim	Network Ten	29 November
(United States) 7th Heaven	Network Ten	30 November
(United States) Nash Bridges	Seven Network	2 December
(United States) The Drew Carey Show	Nine Network	3 December
(United States) Kindred: The Embraced	Network Ten	4 December
(United States) / (Canada) The Sentinel	Network Ten	4 December
(United States) Boston Common	Network Ten	5 December
(United States) The Wright Verdicts	Network Ten	5 December
(United Kingdom) Bramwell	Nine Network	6 December
(United States) Pointman	Nine Network	6 December
(United States) Muppets Tonight	Seven Network	6 December
(United States) Brotherly Love	Seven Network	6 December
(France) / (United States) Iznogoud	Seven Network	7 December
(United Kingdom) The Wind in the Willows (1995)	Nine Network	7 December
(United States) / (New Zealand) Xena: Warrior Princess	Network Ten	7 December
(United States) Caroline in the City	Nine Network	9 December
(United States) Earth Star Voyager	Seven Network	9 December
(United States) The Great Defender	Seven Network	16 December
(United States) Santo Bugito	ABC	19 December
(France) Fire from the Earth	SBS	20 December
(United States) Wishbone	Nine Network	23 December
(United States) Duckman	Seven Network	23 December
(United Kingdom) Space Precinct	Seven Network	23 December
(United States) Scooby-Doo! in Arabian Nights	Seven Network	24 December
(United Kingdom) The Forgotten Toys (TV special)	ABC	25 December
(United Kingdom) Spot's Magical Christmas	ABC	25 December
(United States) Thunder in Paradise	Seven Network	27 December
(United States) Dexter's Laboratory	Seven Network	28 December
(United Kingdom) / (Republic of Ireland) Ballykissangel	ABC	31 December
(United States) The Shnookums and Meat Funny Cartoon Show	Seven Network	1996
(United States) / (China) Jin Jin and the Panda Patrol	Seven Network	1996
(France) / (United States) The Bots Master	Seven Network	1996
(United States) Freakazoid!	Nine Network	Before or After 31 March
(United States) Pinky and the Brain	Nine Network	1996

=== Changes to network affiliation ===
This is a list of programs which made their premiere on an Australian television network that had previously premiered on another Australian television network. The networks involved in the switch of allegiances are predominantly both free-to-air networks or both subscription television networks. Programs that have their free-to-air/subscription television premiere, after previously premiering on the opposite platform (free-to air to subscription/subscription to free-to air) are not included. In some cases, programs may still air on the original television network. This occurs predominantly with programs shared between subscription television networks.

==== Domestic ====
Program	New network(s)	Previous network(s)	Date
Hey Dad..!	Network Ten	Seven Network	23 September

==== International ====
Program	New network(s)	Previous network(s)	Date
(United States) Lois & Clark: The New Adventures of Superman	Nine Network	Seven Network	20 February
(United Kingdom) Fawlty Towers	ABC	Seven Network	17 June
(United Kingdom) Count Duckula	Network Ten	ABC	22 August
(United States) Friends	Nine Network	Seven Network	9 December
(United Kingdom) Danger Mouse	Network Ten	ABC	1996

=== Subscription premieres ===
This is a list of programs which made their premiere on Australian subscription television that had previously premiered on Australian free-to-air television. Programs may still air on the original free-to-air television network.

==== Domestic ====
Program	Subscription network	Free-to-air network	Date
The Adventures of Blinky Bill	Fox Kids	ABC	3 June
Blinky Bill's Extraordinary Excursion	Fox Kids	ABC	1996
Fast Forward	The Comedy Channel	Seven Network	1996
The Big Gig	The Comedy Channel	ABC	1996
The Comedy Company	The Comedy Channel	Network Ten	1996
Let the Blood Run Free	The Comedy Channel	Network Ten	1996
Alvin Purple	The Comedy Channel	ABC	1996
Fox Kids Klubhouse	Fox Kids		1996

==== International ====
Program	Subscription network	Free-to-air network	Date
(United States) Droopy Dog	Cartoon Network	Seven Network	1 January
(Spain) Wisdom of the Gnomes	Nickelodeon	ABC	5 February
(United Kingdom) See How They Grow	Nickelodeon	ABC	5 February
(United States) H.R. Pufnstuf	Nickelodeon	Nine Network; Network Ten	March
(United States) Yogi the Easter Bear	Cartoon Network	Seven Network	April
(United States) Mother Goose and Grimm	Nickelodeon		14 April
(United States) / (United Kingdom) Where's Wally?	Nickelodeon	ABC	20 April
(United Kingdom) / (France) Dr. Zitbag's Transylvania Pet Shop	Nickelodeon		5 May
(United States) Mickey Mouse and Friends	Disney Channel		June
(United States) Donald's Quack Attack	Disney Channel		June
(United States) The New Adventures of Winnie the Pooh	Disney Channel	Seven Network	June
(United States) / (United Kingdom) The Muppet Show	Disney Channel	Seven Network; Nine Network; Network Ten	June
(United States) Muppet Babies	Disney Channel	Network Ten	June
(United States) Dumbo's Circus	Disney Channel		June
(United States) DuckTales	Disney Channel	Seven Network	June
(United States) TaleSpin	Disney Channel	Seven Network	June
(United States) Chip 'n Dale Rescue Rangers	Disney Channel	Seven Network	June
(United States) Gargoyles	Disney Channel	Seven Network	June
(United States) Bill Nye the Science Guy	Disney Channel		June
(United States) Mousercise	Disney Channel		June
(United States) Welcome to Pooh Corner	Disney Channel		June
(United Kingdom) Doctor Who (1963)	UKTV	ABC	1 August
(United Kingdom) Rockliffe's Babies	UKTV		5 August
(United States) Big Bag	Cartoon Network		7 September
(United States) Lifestyles of the Rich and Famous	TV1	Nine Network	4 November
(United States) Captain Planet and the Planeteers	Cartoon Network	ABC	
(Canada) Groundling Marsh	Fox Kids		
(United States) The Tracey Ullman Show	Fox8	ABC	
(Canada) Mom P.I.	Disney Channel		
(United States) Huckleberry Hound	Cartoon Network	Nine Network; Seven Network	
(United States) 2 Stupid Dogs	Cartoon Network	Seven Network	
(United States) Crazy Like a Fox	Disney Channel	Network Ten	
(United States) The What-a-Cartoon! Show	Cartoon Network		
(Canada) Polka Dot Door	Horizon Learning Channel		
(Canada) Bookmice	Horizon Learning Channel		
(United Kingdom) Girls on Top	The Comedy Channel	ABC	
(United States) Simon	The Comedy Channel		
(United Kingdom) EastEnders	UKTV	ABC	
(United Kingdom) The Good Life	UKTV	ABC; Seven Network; Network Ten	
(United Kingdom) The New Statesman	The Comedy Channel	Seven Network	
(United States) Beavis and Butt-head	The Comedy Channel		
(United Kingdom) Hi-de-Hi!	UKTV	ABC	
(New Zealand) Shortland Street	UKTV	SBS	
(United States) Scooby's All-Star Laff-A-Lympics	Cartoon Network	Nine Network; Seven Network	
(United States) Boy Meets World	Disney Channel	Nine Network	
(United States) Dinosaurs	Disney Channel	Seven Network	
(Canada) / (France) / (New Zealand) White Fang	Disney Channel		
(United States) Dallas	Fox8	Network Ten	
(United Kingdom) The Goodies	UKTV	ABC; Seven Network; Network Ten	
(United Kingdom) All Creatures Great and Small	UKTV	ABC	
(United Kingdom) The Two Ronnies	UKTV	ABC; Seven Network	
(United Kingdom) The Piglet Files	The Comedy Channel	Seven Network	
(United Kingdom) Top of the Pops	UKTV		
(United States) Adventures in Wonderland	Disney Channel		
(Canada) Join In!	Horizon Learning Channel		
(United States) Mister Rogers' Neighborhood	Horizon Learning Channel		
(United Kingdom) Danger UXB	UKTV	ABC	
(United Kingdom) Hannay	UKTV	ABC	
(United States) The Critic	Arena	Network Ten	
(United Kingdom) Minder	UKTV	ABC; Seven Network; Network Ten	
(United Kingdom) The Spooks of Bottle Bay	Nickelodeon		
(United States) Princess Gwenevere and the Jewel Riders	Fox Kids		
(France) / (United States) Sky Dancers	Fox Kids		
(United States) The 5 Mrs. Buchanans	Fox8		
(Canada) Four on the Floor	The Comedy Channel		
(Canada) African Skies	Disney Channel		
(United Kingdom) Fawlty Towers	UKTV	ABC; Seven Network	

=== Changes to network affiliation ===
This is a list of programs which made their premiere on an Australian television network that had premiered on another Australian television network. The networks involved in the switch of allegiances are predominantly both free-to-air networks or both subscription television networks. Programs that have their free-to-air/subscription television premiere, after having premiered on the opposite platform (free-to air to subscription/subscription to free-to air) are not included. In some cases, programs may still air on the original television network. This occurs predominantly with programs shared between subscription television networks.

==== International ====
Program	New network(s)	Previous network(s)	Date
(United States) Tom and Jerry	Cartoon Network	Max	1 January
(United States) Quick Draw McGraw	Cartoon Network	Max	21 January
(Canada) / (United States) ReBoot	Nickelodeon	Max	3 February
(United Kingdom) Eye of the Storm	Nickelodeon	Max	3 February
(United Kingdom) Tales from Fat Tulip's Garden	Nickelodeon	Max	8 February
(United States) The Baby Huey Show	Nickelodeon	Max	9 March
(United States) Eerie, Indiana	Nickelodeon	Max	10 March
(Japan) Astro Boy	Nickelodeon	Max	27 July
(United Kingdom) Captain Scarlet and the Mysterons	Nickelodeon	Max	1996

== Television shows ==
ABC TV

- Mr. Squiggle and Friends (1959–1999)
- Four Corners (1961–present)
- Rage (1987–beyond)
- G.P. (1989–1996)
- Foreign Correspondent (1992–present)
- Frontline (1994–1997)

Seven Network

- Wheel of Fortune (1981–1996, 1996–2003, 2004-beyond)
- A Country Practice (1981–1994)
- Home and Away (1988–present)
- Family Feud (1988–1996)
- The Great Outdoors (1993–2006, 2007)
- Full Frontal (1993–present)
- Blue Heelers (1994–2006)

Nine Network

- Sunday (1981–2008)
- Today (1982–present)
- Sale of the Century (1980–2001)
- A Current Affair (1971–1978, 1988–2005, 2006–present)
- Hey Hey It's Saturday (1971–1999)
- The Midday Show (1973–1998)
- 60 Minutes (1979–present)
- The Flying Doctors (1986–1991)
- Australia's Funniest Home Video Show (1990–2000, 2000–2004, 2005–present)
- Hey Hey It's Saturday (1971–1999)
- Getaway (1992–present)
- Our House (1993–2001)
- Money (1993–2000)

Network Ten

- Neighbours (1985–present)
- E Street (1989–1993)
- Good Morning Australia with Bert Newton (1991–2005)
- Sports Tonight (1993–2011)

== Ending this year ==
Date	Show	Channel	Debut
28 January	House of Fun	Network Ten	1993
25 March	Blinky Bill's Extraordinary Excursion	ABC	19 February 1996
7 April	Naked: Stories of Men	ABC	3 March 1996
9 May	Fire	Seven Network	1995
28 June	Mulligrubs	Network Ten	1988
25 July	Mercury	ABC	2 May 1996
30 August	First Edition	ABC	1993
19 November	Sweat	Network Ten	20 April 1996
22 November	Police Rescue	ABC	1989
22 November	Ship to Shore	ABC; Nine Network	1993
27 November	Talk to the Animals	Seven Network	1993
10 December	G.P.	ABC	1989

== See also ==
- 1996 in Australia
- List of Australian films of 1996
