= 1995 in Australian television =

== Events ==
- 2 January – Hey Hey It's Saturday launches in 1995 without Ossie Ostrich as Ernie Carroll, who was Graham Kennedy's on-screenwriter from the early IMT days, retired at the end of 1994.
- The whole year – Hey Hey It's Saturday Spin-off The Best/Worst of Red Faces had specials aired on 13 February, 15 May and 10 August
- 18 January – American sitcom The Nanny premieres on Network Ten.
- 24 January – Australian lifestyle series Better Homes and Gardens premieres on the Seven Network.
- 29 January - Network Ten launches a new on-air presentation package, with the slogan "Give Me Ten" which lasts until early January 1997.
- 30 January – Australian current affairs program Today Tonight airs on the Seven Network. The show will be launched with individual editions in each of Sydney, Melbourne, Adelaide, Perth and Brisbane.
- 6 February - Wheel of Fortune returns for the new year on Seven Network, with some changes to the new cash values on the Wheel starting from $100+. The changes to top Dollars are from $450 to $500 in Round 1, $750 to $1000 in Round 2 and $2000 remains the same. The Surprise Wedge is introduced on the wheel, where contestants spin up that wedge gets a letter, solves the puzzle for a major prize. The show has a new logo, revised set, theme music, with the audience-voice yell "WHEEL...OF...FORTUNE..." and John Burgess & Adriana Xenides are now welcomed on-screen as 'Burgo & Adriana'.
- 10 February – Roger Climpson presents his final bulletin for Seven Nightly News after deciding to stand down after his diagnosis with prostate cancer. Ann Sanders replaced him the following Monday (13 February).
- 14 February – Australian drama series Fire screens on the Seven Network.
- 17 February – Australian children's education series Lift Off is back with a brand new series at 4:30pm on ABC.
- 20 March – Australian children's comedy series The Ferals return for a brand new series at 5:00pm every Monday on ABC.
- 24 March – Final episode of the Australian children's educational series Lift Off airs on ABC.
- 24 April – Australian comedy series which satirised 1970s-era U.S. police television dramas Funky Squad debuts on the ABC only running for 7 episodes.
- 24 April – The First Oz Lotto draw screened on Television starting on the Seven Network then the Nine Network in 2005.
- 1 May – Kerry Stokes becomes chairman of the Seven Network after reaching 20% ownership of the company.
- 29 May – Australian children's game show A*mazing returns to Seven Network for a brand new series.
- 29 May – Australian teenage game show Vidiot returns for a new brand series on ABC at 5:30pm with Scott McRae as presenter once again.
- 26 June – The ABC broadcasts the final episode of the Australian children's comedy series The Ferals at 5:00pm.
- 3 July – Australian children's television series Glad Rags premieres on Nine Network.
- 10 July – Network Ten debuts a brand new weekday morning children's cartoon programme called Cheez TV presented by teenagers Jade Gatt and Ryan Lappin.
- 20 July – Final episode of Australian teen game show Vidiot airs on ABC at 5:30pm with a special guest appearance by Andrew Denton.
- 24 July – Sale of the Century celebrates its 15th anniversary with a one-hour tribute special airs on the Nine Network at 7:30pm.
- 4 August – WIN Television axes its Regional Television News Bulletin in Albury. It is reintroduced nine months later.
- 4 September – Australian children's television series Bananas in Pyjamas begins airing in the United States for the first time when the series goes to air in Syndication with the word "pyjamas" being changed to reflect the American spelling "pajamas". The series would air from 1995 to 1999, with a large range of merchandise such as books, toys and videos.
- 14 September – Australian miniseries Blue Murder premieres on the ABC in all states and territories except NSW and the ACT due to the life sentence of Neddy Smith.
- 15 September – Blue Heelers begins airing on RTÉ Television in Ireland for the very first time. The iconic Australia police drama series itself will start off airing on RTÉ One.
- 3 October – Australian game show Wheel of Fortune broadcasts, produces and airs its 3000th episode.
- 15 November – Australian children's television series Bananas in Pyjamas gets set to air in Malaysia on the country's already newly launched free to air television network MetroVision.
- 20 November – In Neighbours, Susan Kennedy and Brett Start arrive in Africa,
- 26 November – The 1994 film Four Weddings and a Funeral starring Hugh Grant and Andie MacDowell premieres on the Nine Network.
- STW-9 is purchased by Sunraysia Television after a fierce bidding war with WIN Television.
- 1 December – Neighbours airs the 1995 season finale: Brett Stark and Susan Kennedy return from Africa, Annalise Hartman and Stonie Rebecchi sleep together and Sonny Hammond threatens Libby Kennedy.
- Juanita Phillips leaves Network Ten to join new news channel service by Foxtel, Sky News the following year.
- Pay television arrives in Australia with Foxtel & Optus Vision launching in the metropolitan areas & Galaxy & Austar launching in regional areas that year.
- Anne Fulwood returns to the Seven Network in October to present its new late night news bulletin.

=== Channels ===
==== New channels ====
- 26 January – Fox Sports
- 26 January – ANBC
- 3 March – Showtime
- 3 March – Encore
- 2 April – TV1
- 22 April – Arena
- 22 April – Max
- 22 April – Red
- 22 April – Quest
- 19 September – The Movie Network
- 19 September – Movie Greats
- 19 September – CNN International
- 19 September – ESPN
- 19 September – Sports Australia
- 3 October – Cartoon Network
- 23 October – Nickelodeon
- 23 October – Fox8
- 23 October – fX
- 4 December – The Value Channel

== Debuts ==
=== Free-to-air television domestic series ===
| Program | Network | Debut date |
|---|---|---|
| Better Homes and Gardens | Seven Network | 24 January |
| Today Tonight | Seven Network | 30 January |
| Wildlife with Olivia Newton-John | Nine Network | 2 February |
| Fire | Seven Network | 14 February |
| Sky Trackers | Seven Network | 19 March |
| Club Buggery | ABC TV | 21 April |
| Funky Squad | ABC TV | 24 April |
| Gladiators | Seven Network | 29 April |
| Echo Point | Network Ten | 1 June |
| Correlli | ABC TV | 1 July |
| Glad Rags | Nine Network | 3 July |
| Insight | SBS TV | 6 July |
| Cheez TV | Network Ten | 10 July |
| Weddings | Nine Network | 19 July |
| Blue Murder | ABC TV | 14 September |
| Spellbinder | Nine Network | 25 September |
| RPA | Nine Network | 28 September |
| Lizzie's Library | ABC TV | 6 November |
| Face to Face | Seven Network | 19 November |
| Yamba's Playtime | Imparja Television | 1995 |

=== Free-to-air television international series ===
| Program | Network | Debut date |
|---|---|---|
| (Netherlands) Mr. Raab | SBS TV | 3 January |
| (United States) Moon Over Miami | Network Ten | 5 January |
| (United States) Bugs Bunny's Overtures to Disaster | Nine Network | 7 January |
| (Germany) Great Epochs of European Art | SBS TV | 8 January |
| (France) The Spirit of Freedom | SBS TV | 9 January |
| (United States) Family Pictures | Network Ten | 15 January |
| (United Kingdom) Goodnight Sweetheart | ABC TV | 16 January |
| (United Kingdom) An Actor's Life for Me | ABC TV | 16 January |
| (United States) The Larry Sanders Show | Network Ten | 18 January |
| (United States) Dream On | Network Ten | 18 January |
| (United States) The Nanny | Network Ten | 18 January |
| (United Kingdom) Screaming | ABC TV | 24 January |
| (United Kingdom) Floyd on Italy | SBS TV | 28 January |
| (United States) / (Canada) Cadillacs and Dinosaurs | Network Ten | 30 January |
| (United States) / (Australia) Time Trax | Seven Network | 31 January |
| (United Kingdom) The Vampyr | SBS TV | 3 February |
| (United States) California Dreams | Seven Network | 4 February |
| (United States) Name Your Adventure | Seven Network | 4 February |
| (United States) The Unknown Marx Brothers | ABC TV | 4 February |
| (Netherlands) Heartbeat of Our Times | SBS TV | 4 February |
| (United Kingdom) Love on a Branch Line | ABC TV | 5 February |
| (United States) Superhuman Samurai Syber-Squad | Network Ten | 13 February |
| (United States) Fortune Hunter | Network Ten | 16 February |
| (United States) The Last Shot | Network Ten | 16 February |
| (United States) ER | Nine Network | 16 February |
| (United States) The Cosby Mysteries | Network Ten | 17 February |
| (United States) / (Canada) The Terrible Thunderlizards | Network Ten | 18 February |
| (United States) Skeleton Warriors | Network Ten | 18 February |
| (United Kingdom) A Dark-Adapted Eye | ABC TV | 26 February |
| (France) This is My Story | SBS TV | 28 February |
| (United Kingdom) Doctor Finlay | ABC TV | 3 March |
| (United States) Aladdin | Seven Network | 4 March |
| (United States) Bakersfield P.D. | Seven Network | 7 March |
| (United Kingdom) Victor and Hugo | ABC TV | 14 March |
| (United Kingdom) Cracker | Seven Network | 16 March |
| (Republic of Ireland) Family | ABC TV | 19 March |
| (United States) South of Sunset | Nine Network | 20 March |
| (United Kingdom) Boot Street Band | Seven Network | 23 March |
| (France) Wild Sanctuaries | SBS TV | 28 March |
| (United States) The World of Jim Henson | ABC TV | 29 March |
| (Canada) Million Dollar Babies | Nine Network | 2 April |
| (Germany) The Hallo Spencer Show | Nine Network | 3 April |
| (Spain) The Wisdom of The Gnomes | ABC TV | 9 April |
| (United States) Cybill | Nine Network | 10 April |
| (United Kingdom) Archer's Goon | ABC TV | 14 April |
| (Canada) Curse of the Viking Grave | ABC TV | 14 April |
| (United States) Invasion of the Bunny Snatchers | WIN Television | 14 April |
| (United States) Bugs Bunny's Creature Features | WIN Television | 14 April |
| (Canada) / (United States) A Bunch of Munsch | ABC TV | 17 April |
| (Spain) Tango | SBS TV | 18 April |
| (Canada) Due South | Seven Network | 20 April |
| (United Kingdom) Pie in the Sky | ABC TV | 23 April |
| (United States) Medicine Ball | Nine Network | 25 April |
| (Canada) RoboCop: The Series | Seven Network | 29 April |
| (United Kingdom) What-a-Mess | ABC TV | 3 May |
| (United States) Harts of the West | Seven Network | 3 May |
| (United States) Chicago Hope | Seven Network | 8 May |
| (United States) Sweet Valley High | Seven Network | 13 May |
| (United States) Earth 2 | Network Ten | 14 May |
| (United Kingdom) Nice Town | ABC TV | 14 May |
| (United States) The Tommyknockers | Seven Network | 21 May |
| (South Africa) Ordinary People | SBS TV | 25 May |
| (United States) Robin's Hoods | Network Ten | 26 May |
| (United States) Problem Child | Network Ten | 27 May |
| (United States) Living Single | Nine Network | 30 May |
| (United Kingdom) The Clive James Show | ABC TV | 3 June |
| (United Kingdom) A Skirt Through History | ABC TV | 7 June |
| (United States) Saved by the Bell: The New Class | Seven Network | 10 June |
| (United Kingdom) The Vicar of Dibley | ABC TV | 12 June |
| (United States) Space Cats | Seven Network | 21 June |
| (United States) Homefront | Seven Network | 21 June |
| (United Kingdom) Cook's Tour of France | SBS TV | 1 July |
| (United States) The Tick | Network Ten | 1 July |
| (United Kingdom) Earthfasts | ABC TV | 3 July |
| (United Kingdom) Art Attack | ABC TV | 3 July |
| (Poland) Maidens and Widows | SBS TV | 4 July |
| (United States) / (Canada) Free Willy | Nine Network | 8 July |
| (United States) Children of the Dust | Nine Network | 9 July |
| (United Kingdom) Anytime Tales | ABC TV | 10 July |
| (Japan) Teknoman | Network Ten | 10 July |
| (United Kingdom) Seaforth | ABC TV | 14 July |
| (United Kingdom) Defenders of the Wild | SBS TV | 17 July |
| (Japan) Funky Fables | Network Ten | 21 July |
| (United States) Rocko's Modern Life | ABC TV | 24 July |
| (United States) Where on Earth Is Carmen Sandiego? | Network Ten | 29 July |
| (United States) It Had to Be You | Seven Network | 7 August |
| (United Kingdom) Private Life of Plants | ABC TV | 12 August |
| (Canada) / (United States) Are You Afraid of the Dark? | ABC TV | 13 August |
| (Canada) Rigolecole | ABC TV | 16 August |
| (United States) Hollyrock-a-Bye Baby | Seven Network | 18 August |
| (United Kingdom) All-New British Bloopers | Seven Network | 18 August |
| (Canada) / (France) / (United States) The Busy World of Richard Scarry | ABC TV | 21 August |
| (United Kingdom) Tears Before Bedtime | ABC TV | 27 August |
| (United States) The Good Life | Seven Network | 1 September |
| (Japan) Saban's Adventures of the Little Mermaid | Nine Network | 4 September |
| (United Kingdom) Avenger Penguins | ABC TV | 6 September |
| (United Kingdom) Martin Chuzzlewit | ABC TV | 10 September |
| (United Kingdom) Tee Off, Mr. Bean | ABC TV | 14 September |
| (France) / (United States) Heathcliff and the Catillac Cats | Seven Network | 16 September |
| (United Kingdom) State of the Ark | SBS TV | 17 September |
| (United Kingdom) Goodnight Mr. Bean | ABC TV | 21 September |
| (United Kingdom) Chandler & Co | ABC TV | 22 September |
| (United States) American Cinema | ABC TV | 22 September |
| (New Zealand) All for One | ABC TV | 25 September |
| (Canada) / (United States) Monster Force | Network Ten | 30 September |
| (Australia) / (New Zealand) Mirror, Mirror | Network Ten | 30 September |
| (United States) Bodies of Evidence | Seven Network | 2 October |
| (United States) The George Carlin Show | Seven Network | 4 October |
| (Canada) / (United States) ReBoot | Seven Network | 7 October |
| (United Kingdom) The Legends of Treasure Island | ABC TV | 8 October |
| (United States) 2 Stupid Dogs | Seven Network | 9 October |
| (United Kingdom) / (United States) / (Canada) Magic Adventures of Mumfie | ABC TV | 13 October |
| (United States) All-American Girl | Seven Network | 19 October |
| (Japan) The Littl' Bits | Network Ten | 20 October |
| (United States) The Native Americans | SBS TV | 22 October |
| (United States) Wild West C.O.W.-Boys of Moo Mesa | Nine Network | 26 October |
| (United States) Journey to the Heart of the World | Seven Network | 31 October |
| (United States) We All Have Tales | Network Ten | 4 November |
| (Canada) / (France) The Real Story of | ABC TV | 7 November |
| (United Kingdom) Band of Gold | Seven Network | 7 November |
| (United Kingdom) The Memoirs of Sherlock Holmes | Seven Network | 8 November |
| (United Kingdom) Chris Cross | ABC TV | 12 November |
| (Germany) / (Canada) Family Passions | Seven Network | 17 November |
| (United Kingdom) Reputations | ABC TV | 20 November |
| (United Kingdom) The Beatles Anthology | Seven Network | 22 November |
| (Canada) Katie and Orbie | ABC TV | 24 November |
| (United Kingdom) Five Children and It | ABC TV | 25 November |
| (United Kingdom) Scavengers | Network Ten | 3 December |
| (United States) Party of Five | Network Ten | 3 December |
| (United States) Sweet Justice | Network Ten | 4 December |
| (Canada) / (France) The Legend of White Fang | ABC TV | 4 December |
| (United States) The Prize: The Epic Quest for Oil, Money and Power | ABC TV | 5 December |
| (United States) Madman of the People | Network Ten | 5 December |
| (United States) University Hospital | Network Ten | 5 December |
| (United States) Viper | Nine Network | 5 December |
| (United States) New York Undercover | Network Ten | 6 December |
| (United States) Homicide: Life on the Street | Seven Network | 6 December |
| (United States) High Tide | Network Ten | 7 December |
| (United States) Gargoyles | Seven Network | 9 December |
| (United Kingdom) Crocodile Shoes | Nine Network | 9 December |
| (Soviet Union) / (United States) Animated Classic Showcase | ABC TV | 10 December |
| (United States) Ellen | Seven Network | 11 December |
| (Spain) Choof! | SBS TV | 12 December |
| (Italy) Octopus 12 | SBS TV | 12 December |
| (United States) Weird Science | Network Ten | 13 December |
| (Germany) Stella Stellaris | SBS TV | 14 December |
| (United Kingdom) Return of the Psammead | ABC TV | 16 December |
| (United States) Phenom | Nine Network | 16 December |
| (United States) Me and the Boys | Nine Network | 16 December |
| (United States) Aliens' First Christmas | Seven Network | 18 December |
| (United States) A Merry Mirthworm Christmas | Seven Network | 19 December |
| (United Kingdom) / (Germany) / (Spain) The Wanderer | Seven Network | 19 December |
| (Canada) Johann's Gift to Christmas | Seven Network | 19 December |
| (Canada) Bluetoes the Christmas Elf | Seven Network | 21 December |
| (United States) Nick and Noel | Seven Network | 21 December |
| (United States) Deck the Halls | Seven Network | 21 December |
| (United States) BattleTech: The Animated Series | Seven Network | 23 December |

=== Changes to network affiliation ===
This is a list of programs which made their premiere on an Australian television network that had previously premiered on another Australian television network. The networks involved in the switch of allegiances are predominantly both free-to-air networks or both subscription television networks. Programs that have their free-to-air/subscription television premiere, after previously premiering on the opposite platform (free-to air to subscription/subscription to free-to air) are not included. In some cases, programs may still air on the original television network. This occurs predominantly with programs shared between subscription television networks.

==== International ====
| Program | New network(s) | Previous network(s) | Date |
|---|---|---|---|
| (United States) Beakman's World | Nine Network | Network Ten | 23 January |
| (United Kingdom) Dad's Army | Network Ten | ABC TV | 1 July |
| (United States) C.O.P.S. | Network Ten | Nine Network | 30 October |
| (United States) ALF | Nine Network | Seven Network | 6 November |
| (United States) / (United Kingdom) / (Wales) Fantastic Max | Seven Network | ABC TV | 14 December |
| (Australia) / (France) / (United States) Clowning Around II | ABC TV | Seven Network | 15 December |
| (Canada) A Cosmic Christmas | Network Ten | ABC TV | 25 December |
| (United Kingdom) Monty Python's Flying Circus | ABC TV | Seven Network | 28 December |

=== Subscription premieres ===
This is a list of programs which made their premiere on Australian subscription television that had previously premiered on Australian free-to-air television. Programs may still air on the original free-to-air television network.

==== Domestic ====
| Program | Subscription network | Free-to-air network | Date |
|---|---|---|---|
| Kaboodle | Max; Nickelodeon | ABC TV; Seven Network | 23 October (Nickelodeon) |
| Elly & Jools | Max; Nickelodeon | Nine Network | |
| Police Rescue | Arena | ABC TV | |
| Prisoner | Max | Network Ten | |

==== International ====
| Program | Subscription network | Free-to-air network | Date |
|---|---|---|---|
| (United States) The A-Team | TV1 | Network Ten | April |
| (United States) Battlestar Galactica | TV1 | Seven Network | April |
| (United States) Benson | TV1 | Nine Network | April |
| (United States) The Bionic Woman | TV1 | | April |
| (United States) B. J. and the Bear | TV1 | Nine Network | April |
| (United States) Dennis the Menace (1959) | TV1 | Seven Network; Nine Network; Network Ten (as Channel 0) | April |
| (United States) Dragnet | TV1 | | April |
| (United States) Fonz and the Happy Days Gang | TV1 | Nine Network | April |
| (United States) / (Canada) Friday the 13th: The Series | TV1 | Network Ten | April |
| (United States) Gimme a Break! | TV1 | | April |
| (United States) The Incredible Hulk | TV1 | Seven Network | April |
| (United States) The Jeffersons | TV1 | Network Ten (as Channel 0) | April |
| (United States) Knight Rider | TV1 | Nine Network | April |
| (United States) McHale's Navy | TV1 | Nine Network | April |
| (United States) Miami Vice | TV1 | Nine Network; Network Ten | April |
| (United States) The Rockford Files | TV1 | Network Ten (as Channel 0) | April |
| (United States) She-Wolf of London | TV1 | | April |
| (United States) TJ Hooker | TV1 | Network Ten | April |
| (United States) Webster | TV1 | Nine Network | April |
| (United States) Twinkle the Dream Being | Max | | 7 August |
| (United Kingdom) Fiddley Foodle Bird | Max | | 23 September |
| (United States) The Flintstones | Cartoon Network | Seven Network; Nine Network; Network Ten (as Channel 0) | 3 October |
| (United States) The Jetsons | Cartoon Network | Seven Network | 3 October |
| (United States) Thundarr the Barbarian | Cartoon Network | Network Ten; Seven Network | 3 October |
| (United States) Secret Squirrel | Cartoon Network | ABC TV; Seven Network | 3 October |
| (United States) Rugrats | Nickelodeon | ABC TV | 23 October |
| (United States) Baywatch | Fox8 | Network Ten | 23 October |
| (United States) Rocko's Modern Life | Nickelodeon | ABC TV | 23 October |
| (United States) L.A. Law | Fox8 | Network Ten | 23 October |
| (Canada) / (United States) Papa Beaver's Storytime | Nickelodeon | | 23 October |
| (United States) Gullah Gullah Island | Nickelodeon | | 23 October |
| (Canada) Are You Afraid of the Dark? | Nickelodeon | ABC TV | 23 October |
| (United States) Garfield and Friends | Nickelodeon | Network Ten | 23 October |
| (United States) Nick Arcade | Nickelodeon | | 23 October |
| (United States) The Simpsons | Fox8 | Network Ten | 23 October |
| (United States) Capitol Critters | Fox8 | Network Ten | 27 October |
| (United Kingdom) Dig and Dug | Nickelodeon | | 28 October |
| (United States) The Ren and Stimpy Show | Nickelodeon | Network Ten | 28 October |
| (United States) Aaahh!!! Real Monsters | Nickelodeon | | 28 October |
| (United States) Roundhouse | Nickelodeon | | 28 October |
| (United States) The Perils of Penelope Pitstop | Cartoon Network | Nine Network | 1 November |
| (United States) The Round Table | Fox8 | | 5 November |
| (United States) Airwolf | TV1 | Seven Network | 6 November |
| (United States) Allegra's Window | Nickelodeon | | 6 November |
| (United Kingdom) Just So Stories | Nickelodeon | | 10 November |
| (Spain) / (Netherlands) The World of David the Gnome | Nickelodeon | ABC TV | 20 November |
| (United Kingdom) Postman Pat | Max; Nickelodeon | ABC TV | |
| (United Kingdom) Rosie and Jim | Max; Nickelodeon | | |
| (United Kingdom) / (Canada) Dino Babies | Max; Nickelodeon | | |
| (United Kingdom) The Wombles (1973) | Max | ABC TV | |
| (United States) Mr. Bogus | Max | | |
| (United Kingdom) Eye of the Storm | Max | | |
| (United States) Dynasty | Fox8 | Seven Network | |
| (United Kingdom) Captain Zed and the Zee Zone | Max | Network Ten | |
| (United Kingdom) The Family Ness | Max | ABC TV | |
| (France) / (United States) / (Canada) Inspector Gadget | Max; Nickelodeon | ABC TV | |
| (United States) The Berenstain Bears | Max; Nickelodeon | ABC TV | |
| (United States) Scooby-Doo, Where Are You? | Max; Cartoon Network | Nine Network; Seven Network | |
| (United States) Quick Draw McGraw | Max | Nine Network; Seven Network | |
| (United Kingdom) Wizadora | Max; Nickelodeon | | |
| (United States) Beverly Hills 90210 | Fox8 | Network Ten | |
| (United States) My Little Pony 'n Friends | Max | Nine Network | |
| (United Kingdom) Brown Bear's Wedding | Max | | |
| (United Kingdom) The Trap Door | Max | ABC TV | |
| (United Kingdom) The Perishers | Max | | |
| (United States) Doug | Nickelodeon | Network Ten | |
| (Canada) / (Scotland) The Campbells | Fox8 | ABC TV | |
| (United States) / (Canada) Eek! The Cat | Fox Kids | Network Ten | |
| (United States) Peter Pan and the Pirates | Fox Kids | Network Ten | |
| (United Kingdom) / (Scotland) / (United States) Hurricanes | Max | | |
| (United States) Cops | Fox8 | Network Ten | |
| (United Kingdom) Brum | Max; Nickelodeon | ABC TV | |
| (United States) The Baby Huey Show | Max | | |
| (United States) Atom Ant | Max | ABC TV; Seven Network | |
| (United Kingdom) Poddington Peas | Max | | |
| (United States) Hong Kong Phooey | Max; Cartoon Network | Nine Network; Seven Network | |
| (Canada) / (France) C.L.Y.D.E. | Max; Nickelodeon | | |
| (United Kingdom) The Amazing Adventures of Morph | Max | ABC TV | |
| (United States) Dastardly and Muttley in Their Flying Machines | Max; Cartoon Network | Nine Network; Network Ten; Seven Network | |
| (United Kingdom) The Giddy Game Show | Max | ABC TV | |
| (United Kingdom) The Greedysaurus Gang | Max | ABC TV | |
| (United Kingdom) Bananaman | Max | ABC TV | |
| (United States) Casper and Friends | Max; Nickelodeon | Network Ten | |
| (United Kingdom) Puddle Lane | Max | ABC TV | |
| (United Kingdom) Outside Edge | Arena | | |
| (Canada) Road to Avonlea | Arena | | |
| (United States) Dennis the Menace (1986) | Max; Nickelodeon | ABC TV | |
| (United States) Denver, the Last Dinosaur | Max; Nickelodeon | Nine Network | |
| (United States) Mighty Max | Max; Nickelodeon | Seven Network | |
| (United States) Rocky and Bullwinkle | Max | Nine Network; Seven Network; Network Ten; ABC TV | |
| (United Kingdom) Roobarb | Max | ABC TV | |
| (United States) Bobby's World | Fox Kids | Network Ten | |
| (United States) Clarissa Explains It All | Nickelodeon | | |
| (United States) Super Dave: Daredevil for Hire | Max; Nickelodeon | | |
| (United States) Tattooed Teenage Alien Fighters from Beverly Hills | Max | | |
| (United Kingdom) The Little Green Man | Max | | |
| (Canada) / (United States) ReBoot | Max | Seven Network | |
| (United Kingdom) Juniper Jungle | Max; Nickelodeon | | |
| (United States) Josie and the Pussycats | Max; Cartoon Network | Nine Network; Seven Network | |
| (United States) Rimba's Island | Fox Kids | | |
| (United Kingdom) Tales from Fat Tulip's Garden | Max | ABC TV | |
| (United States) The All-New Popeye Show | Max; Nickelodeon | Seven Network | |
| (United Kingdom) Captain Scarlet and the Mysterons | Max | Seven Network | |
| (New Zealand) The Fire-Raiser | Max; Nickelodeon | ABC TV | |
| (United States) Inch High Private Eye | Cartoon Network | Nine Network; Seven Network | |
| (United Kingdom) The New Shoe People | Max; Nickelodeon | | |
| (United States) SK8-TV | Nickelodeon | | |
| (United States) The Tick | Fox Kids | Network Ten | |
| (United Kingdom) / (Australia) The Tripods | Max | Seven Network | |
| (Canada) The Odyssey | Nickelodeon | | |
| (United States) Yogi's Treasure Hunt | Cartoon Network | Seven Network | |
| (United States) Zazoo U | Fox Kids | | |
| (United States) / (Canada) Young Robin Hood | Cartoon Network | Seven Network | |
| (United States) SWAT Kats: The Radical Squadron | Cartoon Network | Seven Network | |
| (United Kingdom) Moonacre | Max; Nickelodeon | | |
| (New Zealand) Steel Riders | Max; Nickelodeon | Network Ten | |
| (United States) Storybreak | Max | ABC TV | |
| (United States) Rhoda | Arena | Nine Network | |
| (United States) Harry and the Hendersons | TV1 | ABC TV | |
| (United States) Parker Lewis Can't Lose | TV1 | Nine Network | |
| (United States) Picket Fences | Fox8 | Network Ten | |
| (Canada) Urban Angel | Arena | | |
| (United States) Stunt Dawgs | TV1 | | |
| (United States) Tabitha | TV1 | Seven Network | |
| (United States) The Oddball Couple | TV1 | | |
| (Japan) Kimba the White Lion | Max; Nickelodeon | ABC TV | |
| (United States) The Real Ghostbusters | TV1 | Network Ten; Nine Network | |
| (United States) Kaz | Fox8 | Nine Network | |
| (United States) Goober and the Ghost Chasers | Cartoon Network | Network Ten | |
| (Canada) Neon Rider | Arena | | |
| (Canada) Kids in the Hall | Arena | | |
| (Canada) Maniac Mansion | Arena | Network Ten | |
| (United Kingdom) The Secret Cabaret | Arena | SBS | |
| (United States) Super Dave | Arena | | |
| (United States) One Day at a Time | TV1 | Seven Network | |
| (United Kingdom) Duty Free | Arena | Seven Network | |
| (United Kingdom) Auf Wiedersehen, Pet | Arena | ABC TV | |
| (United States) Saturday Night Live | Arena | | |
| (United States) Hill Street Blues | Arena | Seven Network; Nine Network; Network Ten; ABC TV | |
| (United States) The Munsters Today | TV1 | Network Ten | |
| (United Kingdom) Brookside | Arena | SBS | |
| (United States) St. Elsewhere | Arena | Nine Network | |
| (Japan) / (Canada) The Adventures of the Little Koala | TV1 | Nine Network | |
| (United States) Eerie, Indiana | Max | Seven Network | |
| (Canada) / (France) / (New Zealand) The Adventures of the Black Stallion | Nickelodeon | | |
| (United States) Jennifer Slept Here | TV1 | Nine Network | |
| (Japan) Astro Boy | Max | ABC | |
| (United States) It's Garry Shandling's Show | TV1 | Nine Network | |
| (United Kingdom) The Manageress | Arena | ABC | |
| (United Kingdom) Robin of Sherwood | Arena | Nine Network | |
| (United States) Fonz and the Happy Days Gang | TV1 | Nine Network | |
| (United States) Valley of the Dolls | Arena | | |
| (United States) Heathcliff | Cartoon Network | Nine Network | |
| (United States) Where on Earth Is Carmen Sandiego? | Fox Kids | Network Ten | |
| (United States) The Flintstone Kids | Cartoon Network | Seven Network | |
| (United States) The Centurions | Cartoon Network | Network Ten | |
| (United Kingdom) Sorrell and Son | Arena | ABC TV | |
| (United Kingdom) Winston Churchill: The Wilderness Years | Arena | ABC TV | |
| (United States) Quantum Leap | TV1 | Network Ten | |
| (United States) Who's the Boss? | TV1 | Network Ten | |
| (United States) Soap | TV1 | ABC TV | |
| (United States) Doogie Howser M.D. | Fox8 | Network Ten | |
| (United States) The Girl with Something Extra | TV1 | Nine Network | |
| (New Zealand) Marlin Bay | TV1 | | |
| (United States) Cop Rock | Fox8 | Network Ten | |
| (United Kingdom) In Loving Memory | Arena | | |
| (United States) Starman | TV1 | Network Ten | |
| (United States) Fish | TV1 | Seven Network | |
| (United States) World Class Cuisine | Quest | | |
| (United States) Anything but Love | Fox8 | Network Ten | |
| (United States) Kaz | Fox8 | Nine Network | |
| (United States) / (United Kingdom) / (Wales) Fantastic Max | Cartoon Network | ABC TV | |
| (United States) Old MacDonald's Sing-A-Long Farm | Max; Nickelodeon | | |
| (United States) Geraldo | Fox8 | | |
| (United Kingdom) Deep Sea Dick | Max | | |
| (United States) All My Children | Fox8 | Nine Network | |
| (United States) Small Wonder | Fox8 | Nine Network | |
| (United States) Super Trolls | Max | | |
| (United States) Clue Club | Cartoon Network | Nine Network; Seven Network | |
| (United Kingdom) Bertha | Max; Nickelodeon | | |

== Television shows ==
- Today Tonight (Seven Network)
- Better Homes and Gardens (Seven Network)
- This Is Your Life (Nine Network)

ABC TV

- Mr. Squiggle and Friends (1959–1999)
- Four Corners (1961–present)
- Rage (1987-beyond)
- G.P. (1989–1996)
- Foreign Correspondent (1992–present)
- Frontline (1994–1997)

Seven Network

- Wheel of Fortune (1981–1996, 1996–2003, 2004-beyond)
- A Country Practice (1981–1994)
- Home and Away (1988–present)
- Family Feud (1988–1996)
- The Great Outdoors (1993–2006, 2007)
- Full Frontal (1993–present)
- Blue Heelers (1994–2006)

Nine Network

- Sunday (1981–2008)
- Today (1982–present)
- Sale of the Century (1980–2001)
- A Current Affair (1971–1978, 1988–2005, 2006–present)
- Hey Hey It's Saturday (1971–1999)
- The Midday Show (1973–1998)
- 60 Minutes (1979–present)
- The Flying Doctors (1986–1991)
- Australia's Funniest Home Video Show (1990–2000, 2000–2004, 2005–present)
- Hey Hey It's Saturday (1971–1999)
- Getaway (1992–present)
- Our House (1993–2001)
- Money (1993–2000)

Network Ten

- Neighbours (1985–present)
- E Street (1989–1993)
- Good Morning Australia with Bert Newton (1991–2005)
- Sports Tonight (1993–present)

== Ending this year ==
| Date | Show | Channel | Debut |
|---|---|---|---|
| 24 March | Lift Off | ABC TV | 1992 |
| 20 April | Janus | ABC TV | 1994 |
| 5 June | Funky Squad | ABC TV | 24 April 1995 |
| 26 June | The Ferals | ABC TV | 1994 |
| 29 June | TVTV | ABC TV | 1993 |
| 1 July | The Zone | Nine Network | 1994 |
| 7 July | The Big Breakfast | Network Ten | 1992 |
| 20 July | Vidiot | ABC TV | 1992 |
| 21 July | Glad Rags | Nine Network | 3 July 1995 |
| 1 September | Correlli | ABC TV | 1 July 1995 |
| 8 September | Big Girl's Blouse | Channel Seven | 1994 |
| 10 September | Sky Trackers | Channel Seven | 19 March 1995 |
| 21 September | Blue Murder | ABC TV | 14 September 1995 |
| 7 November | Spellbinder | Nine Network | 25 September 1995 |
| 14 November | The Investigators | ABC TV | 1985 |
| 22 November | Total Recall | Seven Network | 1994 |
| 28 November | The Times | Seven Network | 1994 |
| 30 November | Denton | Seven Network | 1994 |
| 1 December | Echo Point | Network Ten | 1 June 1995 |
| 8 December | Lizzie's Library | ABC TV | 6 November 1995 |
| 23 December | Mirror, Mirror | Network Ten | 30 September 1995 |

== See also ==
- 1995 in Australia
- List of Australian films of 1995
