= 1996 in Australia =

- Monarch: Elizabeth II
- Governor-General: Bill Hayden, then Sir William Deane
- Prime minister: Paul Keating, then John Howard
- Population: 18,310,714
- Elections: TAS, Federal, VIC, WA

The following lists events that happened during 1996 in Australia.

- Decades: 1970s; 1980s; 1990s; 2000s; 2010s
- See also: 1996 in Australian television; 1996 in Australian literature; Other events of 1996; Federal election; Timeline of Australian history

== Incumbents ==
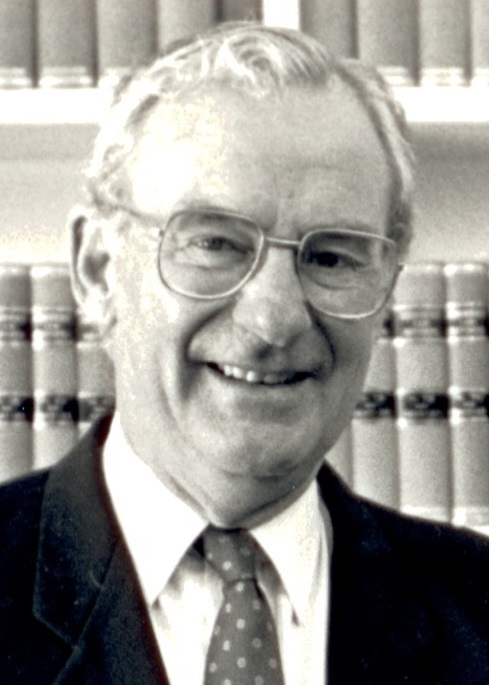
Bill Hayden

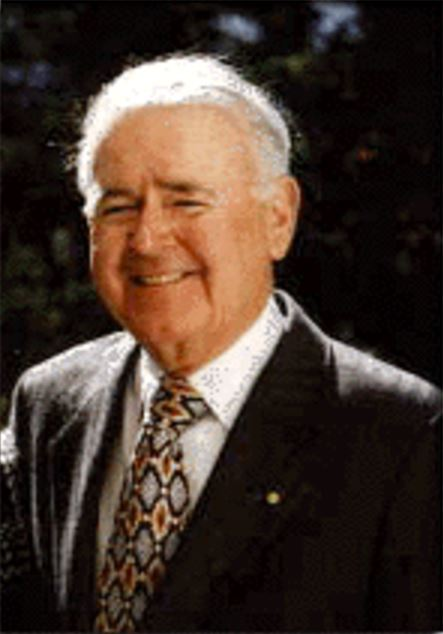
Sir William Deane

Paul Keating

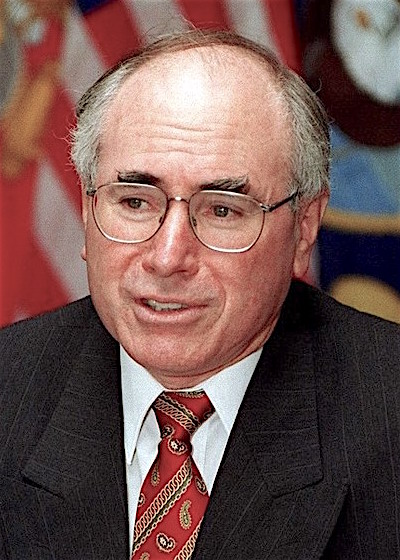
John Howard

- Monarch – Elizabeth II
- Governor-General – Bill Hayden (until 16 February), then Sir William Deane
- Prime Minister – Paul Keating (until 11 March), then John Howard
  - Deputy Prime Minister – Kim Beazley (until 11 March), then Tim Fischer
  - Opposition Leader – John Howard (until 11 March), then Kim Beazley
- Chief Justice – Sir Gerard Brennan

=== State and territory leaders ===
- Premier of New South Wales – Bob Carr
  - Opposition Leader – Peter Collins
- Premier of Queensland – Wayne Goss (until 19 February), then Rob Borbidge
  - Opposition Leader – Rob Borbidge (until 19 February), then Peter Beattie
- Premier of South Australia – Dean Brown (until 28 November), then John Olsen
  - Opposition Leader – Mike Rann
- Premier of Tasmania – Ray Groom (until 18 March), then Tony Rundle
  - Opposition Leader – Michael Field
- Premier of Victoria – Jeff Kennett
  - Opposition Leader – John Brumby
- Premier of Western Australia – Richard Court
  - Opposition Leader – Jim McGinty (until 15 October), then Geoff Gallop
- Chief Minister of the Australian Capital Territory – Kate Carnell
  - Opposition Leader – Rosemary Follett (until 5 March), then Andrew Whitecross
- Chief Minister of the Northern Territory – Shane Stone
  - Opposition Leader – Brian Ede (until 9 April), then Maggie Hickey
- Head of Government of Norfolk Island – Michael King

=== Governors and administrators ===
- Governor of New South Wales – Peter Sinclair (until 1 March), then Gordon Samuels
- Governor of Queensland – Leneen Forde
- Governor of South Australia – Roma Mitchell (until 21 July), then Eric Neal
- Governor of Tasmania – Guy Green
- Governor of Victoria – Richard McGarvie
- Governor of Western Australia – Michael Jeffery
- Administrator of the Australian Indian Ocean Territories – Danny Gillespie (until 30 June)
- Administrator of Norfolk Island – Alan Kerr
- Administrator of the Northern Territory – Austin Asche

== Events ==
=== January ===
- 15 January – New South Wales Police Commissioner Tony Lauer announces his resignation.

=== February ===
- 3 February – Liberal Frank Tanti wins the 1996 Mundingburra state by-election causing Labor to lose its Parliamentary majority in Queensland.
- 5 February – New South Wales Royal Commissioner Justice James Roland Wood's interim report concludes that the police service's internal security, ICAC and the Ombudsman's Office are all incapable of dealing with police corruption.
- 8 February – Queensland Premier Wayne Goss declares the Labor leadership open, but is re-elected unopposed.
- 19 February – Rob Borbidge becomes Premier of Queensland and Joan Sheldon becomes Deputy Premier after Independent MP Liz Cunningham declares her support for the Coalition. Peter Beattie becomes Labor leader, with Jim Elder as deputy.
- 24 February – A state election is held in Tasmania. The Liberal Party government of Ray Groom is re-elected; however, Groom's promise to only govern in a majority saw him resign. A swing of 12% against the Liberal Party saw them reduced to 16 seats with Labor gaining 14 and the Greens 4, with Bruce Goodluck as an Independent.

=== March ===
- 2 March – A federal election is held. The Liberal/National coalition defeats the Labor government of Paul Keating with a landslide two-party preferred vote of 53.9% and a 45-seat majority, one of the biggest wins since World War II.
- 4 March – Prime Minister John Howard outlines his reform agenda, declaring he has been given an emphatic and unambiguous mandate for the partial sale of Telstra and industrial relations changes.
- 8 March – Prime Minister John Howard announces cuts to the ministry (from 31 to 28) and dismisses six departmental heads.
- 11 March –
  - John Howard is sworn in as Australia's 25th Prime Minister. Howard also restores the Queen to the oath of allegiance and the Australian flag to his official car.
- 12 March – Federal Treasurer Peter Costello declares that the "days of sloth and waste are over" and pledges to cut $8 billion from the budget over the next two years.
- 15 March –
  - Malaysian Prime Minister Dr. Mahathir Mohamad agrees to visit Australia for the first time in a decade.
  - Unable to head a minority Government, Tasmanian Premier Ray Groom resigns the Liberal leadership.
- 18 March –
  - Prime Minister John Howard announces that he will move his family into Kirribilli House in Sydney, becoming the first Prime Minister since Sir William McMahon not to live at The Lodge.
  - A paedophile inquiry, forming part of the Wood Royal Commission into police corruption, begins in New South Wales.
  - Tasmanian Treasurer Tony Rundle beats Roger Groom and Michael Hodgman to become Tasmanian Liberal Leader and Premier, with Sue Knowles as deputy.
- 27 March – Indonesian President Suharto invites John Howard to visit Jakarta.
- 29 March – Prime Minister John Howard and Foreign Minister Alexander Downer meet Malaysian Prime Minister Dr.Mahathir Mohamad, who stops briefly in Brisbane on his way to New Zealand.
- 30 March – A state election is held in Victoria The Liberal/National coalition government of Jeff Kennett is re-elected for a second term with a massive 59 to 29 majority over Labor, but suffers a 2.8% swing and loses 2 seats. With 45% of the vote in the Legislative Council, Labor is reduced to 10 of the 44 seats.

=== April ===
- 4 April – The Wiggles' sixth album, Wake up Jeff is released.
- 8 April – Nine people die in a fire at a home for the intellectually disabled in Melbourne, Victoria.
- 28 April – Port Arthur massacre: Martin Bryant kills 35 people and injures 21 in a shooting spree at the Port Arthur historic site in Tasmania. Bryant is captured the next day after an 18½ hour standoff with the Special Operations Group of the Tasmania Police. Federal Attorney-General Daryl Williams says he will press for changes to gun laws.
- 29 April – Prime Minister John Howard orders an emergency meeting of state police ministers to toughen gun laws and draw up a national plan for firearm registration. The Port Arthur massacre crystallises resolve for a national approach to the issue.
- 30 April – Prime Minister John Howard imposes a new code of ministerial conduct on his first day in Parliament, forbidding ministers from engaging in any other work, from holding directorships in public companies and from holding shares in companies in the area of their portfolios.

=== May ===
- 3 May – Queensland Premier Rob Borbidge prepares to dump his election pledge of no new taxes and charges, while Queensland Opposition Leader Peter Beattie signals a move by Labor away from economic rationalism towards service delivery.
- 10 May – Prime Minister John Howard announces new gun control measures, which involve the banning of automatic and semi-automatic weapons, self-loading rifles, shotguns and pump-action shotguns, as well as tightening of other gun laws. A nationwide register will be established, along with requirements for a genuine reason for owning, possessing or using a firearm, minimum standards for storage and mail order sales controls.
- 15–16 May – Debate takes place in the Tasmanian Parliament on Green-sponsored gay reform legislation. The watered down bill is passed, but then rejected by the Legislative Council 8:6.
- 24 May – Prime Minister John Howard indicates that he may have to drop some of his election promises because of budget constraints.
- May – Floods in southern Queensland and northern New South Wales kill five people and cause more than A$55 million in farm losses.
- 25 May – Former federal member for Page, Harry Woods, wins the 1996 Clarence state by-election from the National Party with a 14% swing, thus giving the New South Wales Government a more comfortable 3-seat majority.

=== June ===
- 11 June – Peter Ryan replaces Tony Lauer as New South Wales Police Commissioner.
- 12 June – Two Blackhawk Helicopters collide near Townsville, killing 18 people.
- 16 June – Prime Minister John Howard wears a bullet-proof vest as he confronts an angry crowd of 3,000 in Sale on a tour of rural Australia to listen to the pro-gun lobby, stating that "If I am wrong and you are right then the democratic processes of Australia will vindicate you and condemn me".
- 26 June – Prime Minister John Howard rejects claims by Noel Pearson that he does not believe in the spirit of the Mabo decision, saying "I have always regarded the Mabo decision itself as being a justified, correct decision".

=== July ===
- 1 July – The Northern Territory legalises voluntary euthanasia. The legislation would be later be repealed by a conscience vote in the federal parliament in 1997.
- 3 July – Prime Minister John Howard slashes immigration by 10,000 places to 74,000 a year. citing high unemployment.
- 7 July – The Governor-General, Sir William Deane, warns that unless there are drastic improvements for Aboriginal Australians, reconciliation is doomed until well into the next century.
- 22 July – Foreign Minister Alexander Downer tells Asian governments that Australia will now fund some development aid projects which were to be axed with the closure of the Development Import Finance Facility (DIFF).
- 26 July –
  - Road worker Ivan Milat is found guilty of the murder of seven backpackers between December 1989 and April 1992 in the Belango State Forest, south-west of Sydney. Justice David Hunt hands down a sentence of seven life terms, meaning that Milat will spend the rest of his life in prison.
  - Prime Minister John Howard bolsters United States links by upgrading and expanding Pine Gap and increasing joint military exercises.
- 27 July – HMAS Collins; the first of the Collins Class Submarine, is officially commissioned into service by the Royal Australian Navy.
- 28 July – Janette Howard, wife of John Howard is admitted to hospital to be operated on for a serious medical condition. Howard cancels his first overseas trip to Indonesia and Japan as a result.

=== August ===
- 6 August – The Australian Bureau of Statistics conducts the 1996 National Census.
- 9 August – Federal Education Minister Amanda Vanstone cuts $1.8 billion from higher education funding, as well as a lowering of the HECS repayment threshold from $28,495 to $20,701 and HECS increases of between 35 and 125%.
- 13 August – The Federal Government announces a $400 million cut to the Aboriginal and Torres Strait Islander Commission (ATSIC).
- 14 August – Federal Treasurer Peter Costello releases the Statement on the Conduct of Monetary Policy giving the Reserve Bank of Australia independence, thereby ending the need for it to consult with the Government before making interest rate changes.
- 15 August – The Tasmanian Budget is handed down with big job losses predicted.
- 19 August – Thousands of protesters, in a breakaway group from a pre-budget rally against the Federal Government's workplace reforms, broke down the doors of Parliament House and caused an estimated $200,000 worth of damage in one of the most violent demonstrations ever seen in Australia.
- 20 August –
  - Federal Treasurer Peter Costello hands the Government's first budget, which provides relief for families and small business, with cuts to unemployment programmes, the ages, universities, the ABC, the Australia Council, ATSIC and foreign aid.
  - Senator Mal Colston defects from the Labor Party to become and Independent.
- 28 August – As Australian governor-general, William Deane issued a proclamation that officially established 3 September as Australian National Flag Day.

=== September ===
- 1 September – Senator Richard Alston calls for the full sale of Telstra, drawing a rebuke from Prime Minister John Howard the following day.
- 6 September – The Wiggles' Wiggly Wiggly Christmas album is released.
- 10 September – Independent Federal MP Pauline Hanson makes her maiden speech to Parliament, reigniting the race debate, attacking Asian immigration, calling for a tougher line on Aboriginal welfare, as well as the reintroduction of compulsory national service.
- 16 September – Prime Minister John Howard meets President Suharto in Jakarta and tells him Australia does not need to choose between "our history and our geography". "Neither do I see Australia as a bridge between Asia and the West, as is sometimes suggested," he says. "Rather I believe that our geography and our history are elements in an integrated relationship with our region and the wider world".
- 22 September –
  - Australia's first legal euthanasia takes place in Darwin, Australia when 66-year-old Bob Dent elects to submit to the lethal injection.
  - Prime Minister John Howard states that he welcomes "the fact that people can now talk about certain things without living in fear of being branded a bigot or as a racist" which some felt indicated a veiled acceptance of Pauline Hanson's maiden speech. Hanson declares him "the leader she is prepared to have" the following day.
- 24 September – British Holocaust denier David Irving says he will lodge a new visa application "because these remarks made by the Australian Prime Minister show a new climate of freedom of speech now applying in Australia".
- 25 September – John Howard rejects Pauline Hanson's views on Asian immigration and multi-culturalism but defends her right to express them. He supports reductions in the immigration programme, saying: "there is a link between the high level of unemployment among certain groups in Australia and some past immigration levels in the composition of our programme in the past".
- 26 September – The Dalai Lama meets Prime Minister John Howard in Canberra, Australia during his week-long visit to Australia.

=== October ===
- 1 October – Prime Minister John Howard abandons his election promises for a full public inquiry into cross-media ownership in favour of a low-key, internal review.
- 7 October –
  - Australian Professor Peter C. Doherty wins the Nobel Prize for Medicine jointly with Professor Rolf M. Zinkernagel of Switzerland for showing an important way in which the body targets germs. The research revolutionised the study of immunology and laid the groundwork for designing improved vaccines and researching new therapies against cancer, multiple sclerosis and diabetes.
  - Angry at the direction taken by the Criminal Justice Commission (CJC) investigations, the Queensland Government launches its own inquiry into the CJC, headed by retired judges, Kevin Ryan and Peter Connolly.
- 8 October – Prime Minister John Howard vows always to denounce intolerance and defend the non-discriminatory nature of Australia's immigration policy but questions the value of an inquiry into the stolen generation, saying additional funds would be better spent on improving Aboriginal health, education, housing and employment opportunities.
- 10 October – Paul Streeton douses school boy Tjandamurra O'Shane in petrol and sets him alight, causing burns to 70% of Tjandamurra's body. The case attracts national attention.
- 13 October – Assistant Federal Treasurer, Jim Short, resigns after controversy about his ANZ shareholding.
- 15 October – Parliamentary Secretary to the Treasurer, Brian Gibson, resigns over a share-trading technicality.
- 19 October – Liberal Jackie Kelly retains the seat of Lindsay in the 1996 Lindsay by-election with a primary swing of more than 6 per cent after Labor forces an election re-run on a technicality.
- 25 October – Queensland Premier Rob Borbidge attacks National Party branches which supported Federal MP Pauline Hanson in her anti-immigration policies, warning of the threat to Chinese investment in Queensland projects.
- 27 October – Democrats Leader Cheryl Kernot agrees to support the passage of industrial relations legislation after 171 changes.
- 29 October – Kenneth Carruthers resigns from the Carruthers inquiry on the grounds that its independence was compromised by the Queensland Government. Replacement lawyers then complete the inquiry.
- 30 October – A joint motion opposing racism and re-affirming a non-discriminatory immigration policy attempts to dispel fears voiced in Asia. Prime Minister John Howard describes the motion as "an embodiment of certain attitudes and values that both sides of the House in the national Parliament have in common".

=== November ===
- 4 November – Retired Supreme Court judge David Yeldham commits suicide after being named in the New South Wales Parliament on 31 October by Franca Arena as having received preferential treatment in connection with paedophilia investigations by the New South Wales Police Royal Commission.
- 7 November – Martin Bryant pleads guilty to the massacre of 35 people in a shooting rampage at the Port Arthur historic site in Tasmania in April.
- 11 November – Victorian Cabinet decided to cede its industrial relations power to the Commonwealth following a Democrat move to amend federal law to override Victoria's unfair dismissal laws. Some 400,000 Victorian workers had left the state system for the protection of the federal awards since Jeff Kennett came to power.
- 14 November – Rock star Michael Jackson, aged 38, marries Debbie Rowe, aged 37, at Sydney's Sheraton on the Park Hotel.
- 17 November – Perth teenager David Dicks becomes the youngest person to sail non-stop solo around the world as he arrives back in Fremantle Harbour, having left in February.
- 19 November –
  - The President of the United States Bill Clinton begins a five-day visit to Australia in which he addresses both Houses of Parliament, only the third head of state to do so. Clinton says Australia could be a "shining example" of how people could come together as one nation and a "beacon of hope".
  - Parliament passes the Federal Government's first major economic reform: the Workplace Relations Bill. Industrial Relations Minister Peter Reith agrees to amendments from the Australian Democrats, including a non-disadvantage test ensuring that employees could not be worse off if they signed a non-union individual contract. Reith says the next step is "better practices in key industries like the waterfront, construction and meat processing".
- 22 November – Martin Bryant is sentenced to 35 consecutive sentences of life imprisonment plus 1,035 years without parole for the Port Arthur massacre.
- 27 November – Dean Brown is ousted in a party-room ballot as Premier of South Australia by John Olsen.

=== December ===
- 4 December – Alan Bond pleads guilty to dishonesty offences during the $1 billion takeover of Bell Resources, which is believed to be Australia's biggest corporate fraud.
- 5 December – Independents Brian Harradine and Mal Colston vote to push the Telstra Bill through to the second reading in the Senate, allowing for the part-privatisation of Telstra by the Federal Government, in exchange for an additional $250 million from the sale being spent to ensure regional and rural areas have greater access to telecommunications services. The legislation is expected to pass the Senate the next year and be proclaimed on 1 May.
- 6 December – Minister for Aboriginal Affairs Senator John Herron appoints entrepreneurial Aboriginal businessman Gatjil Djerrkura as the head of the Aboriginal and Torres Strait Islander Commission.
- 14 December – A state election is held in Western Australia. The Liberal/National coalition government of Richard Court is re-elected.
- 18 December – The Carruthers Inquiry recommends that disciplinary action be taken against 8 police officers, including the union president and executive officer.
- 23 December – In a 4–3 majority verdict, the High Court of Australia holds that the native title of the Wik and Thayorre peoples of Cape York has survived the granting of pastoral leases by the Queensland Government and did not necessarily extinguish native title. However, although pastoral leaseholders do not have exclusive possession of grazing land, if the two uses were in conflict, pastoral uses would prevail.
- 27 December – Lone French yachtsman Raphael Dinelli is rescued in treacherous conditions 2,200 kilometres south of the Western Australian coast after his sloop Algimouss was dismasted and its rigging swept overboard on Christmas night.

== Arts and literature ==
- Wendy Sharpe wins the Archibald Prize with Self Portrait – as Diana of Erskineville
- William Robinson wins the Wynne Prize with Creation Landscape Earth and Sea
- National Biography Award established, first winner, Abraham Biderman for The world of my past
- Highways to a War by Christopher Koch wins the Miles Franklin Award

== Film ==
- Shine

== Television ==
- Australian television celebrates its 40th birthday with celebrations lasting throughout the year. The actual birthday was on 16 September.
- January – Jessica Rowe joins Ten News in Sydney to co-anchor with Ron Wilson for the next nine years.
- April – John Burgess is shelved from the Seven Network after being long-time host of Wheel of Fortune. The show begins to repeat the 1988 episodes.
- July – Wheel of Fortune returns and starts in mid-1996 with the relocation from Adelaide to Sydney, with new host Tony Barber.
- August – After a court battle, the first series of Friends screens on the Seven Network, almost two years after it premiered in the United States. Subsequent series is picked up by the Nine Network.

== Sport ==
=== AFL ===
- 18 May – The Fitzroy Lions (16.11.107) defeat the Fremantle Dockers (10.16.76) at the Whitten Oval in what would be Fitzroy's final ever victory as a stand-alone club.
- 8 June – About 2/3 of the way into the 3rd quarter of the match between Essendon & the St Kilda Saints at Waverley Park, the ground lighting fails. The remainder of the game is played the following Tuesday, Essendon won, 13.11.89 to 9.13.67.
- 4 July – The AFL teams endorse a merger between the Fitzroy Lions & the Brisbane Bears.
- 17 August – Fitzroy & Brisbane play each other for the last time before merging. At Optus Oval, Brisbane win 29.13.187 to 14.16.100.
- 25 August – Fitzroy play their last game in Melbourne, against the Richmond Tigers at the MCG. Richmond win, 28.19.187 to 5.6.36. Despite losing by 151 points, the Fitzroy song is played after the game and their fans flood the field.
- 1 September – Fitzroy play their last ever game of Australian rules football as a stand-alone entity. Against Fremantle at Subiaco Oval, Fremantle win, 24.13.157 to 10.11.71.
- 21 September – Tony Lockett kicks a memorable behind to ensure the Swans (10.10.70) defeat the Essendon Bombers (10.9.69) & thus qualify for Sydney's first grand final appearance since 1945.
- 28 September – The North Melbourne Kangaroos (19.17.131) defeat the Sydney Swans (13.10.88) to win the 100th VFL/AFL premiership. It is the Kangaroos' third premiership and they are presented with the only gold premiership cup to mark the centenary season.

=== Cricket ===
- 17 March – Sri Lanka win the Cricket World Cup, defeating Australia in the final.

=== Rugby league ===
- 23 February – Super League's challenge to club loyalty contracts signed with the ARL is ruled out of order & orders banning Super League until 2000 are made.
- 22 March – Clubs aligned with the Super League forfeit opening round of matches in the ARL competition.
- 29 September – Minor premiers the Manly-Warringah Sea Eagles defeat the St. George Dragons 20–8 to win the 89th NSWRL/ARL premiership. The South Queensland Crushers finish in last position, claiming the wooden spoon.
- 4 October – The full bench of the Federal Court overturn the earlier decision to ban Super League, meaning the competition can start in 1997.

=== Soccer ===
- 26 May – Melbourne Knights win the National Soccer League competition for the second season in a row, defeating minor premiers Marconi Fairfield 2–1 in the Final at Olympic Park.

=== Motorsport ===
- 10 March – The first Australian Grand Prix to be held at the Albert Park Street Circuit in Melbourne takes place. Damon Hill, of the Williams team wins.

=== Track and field ===
- 7 March – First day of the Australian Track & Field Championships for the 1995–1996 season, which are held at the ES Marks Athletics Field in Sydney. The 10,000-metre championship was conducted at the Zatopek Meet in Melbourne on 14 December 1995.
- 21 July – Magnus Michelsson wins the men's national marathon title, clocking 2:20:20 in Brisbane, while Sylvia Rose claims the women's title in 2:40:17.

=== Horse racing ===
- 5 November – Saintly wins the Melbourne Cup giving Bart Cummings his 10th win as a trainer.

=== Sailing ===
- 29 December – The 80-foot maxi Morning Glory breaks the race record in winning the 1996 Sydney to Hobart Yacht Race in 2 days 14 hours 7 minutes 10 seconds.

== Births ==
- 3 January – Bradley Mousley, tennis player
- 4 January – Jackson Hastings, rugby league player
- 6 January – Courtney Eaton, actress and model
- 10 January – Dylan Edwards, rugby league player
- 12 January
  - Aaron Calver, footballer
  - Katherine Downie, Paralympic swimmer
- 19 January – James Golding, racing driver
- 25 January – Brandon Walters, actor
- 4 February – Tevita Pangai Junior, rugby league player
- 10 February – Christina Parie, singer-songwriter
- 29 February – Mitchell Kilduff, Paralympic swimmer
- 8 March – Matthew Hammelmann, Australian rules footballer
- 19 March – Kaiya Jones, Scottish-born actress
- 25 March – Dougal Howard, Australian rules footballer
- 10 April – Thanasi Kokkinakis, tennis player
- 17 April – Caitlin Parker, boxer
- 24 April – Ashleigh Barty, tennis player
- 25 April – Mack Horton, Olympic swimmer
- 29 April – Katherine Langford, actress
- 30 April – Jaidyn Leskie (died 1997), murder victim
- 1 May
  - Daniel Saifiti, Australian-Fijian rugby league player
  - Jacob Saifiti, Australian-Fijian rugby league player
- 5 May – Isaac Heeney, footballer
- 18 May – Teeboy Kamara, Liberia-born football soccer player
- 27 May
  - Li Tu, tennis player
  - Minjee Lee, golfer
- 31 May – Connor Watson, rugby league player
- 6 June – Jack Hetherington, rugby league player
- 9 June – Chantelle Kerry, actress, singer, figure skater and ice dancer
- 13 June – Kodi Smit-McPhee, actor
- 25 June – Tyrone May, rugby league player
- 5 July – Ajdin Hrustic, footballer
- 8 July – Braidon Burns, rugby league player
- 16 July – Luke Hemmings, singer and guitarist
- 20 July – Ben Simmons, basketball player
- 25 July – Kristy Pond, sprinter
- 4 August – Kaide Ellis, rugby league player
- 10 August – Evan Evagora, actor
- 17 September – Justin Holborow, actor
- 20 September – Jhye Richardson, cricketer
- 2 October - Tom Trbojevic, rugby league player
- 11 October – Rhea Ripley, pro wrestler
- 22 October – Harley Windsor, pair skater
- 12 November – Amanda Reid, Paralympic swimmer and cyclist
- 12 December – Lachlan Croker, rugby league player
- 18 December – Jayo Archer, motocross rider (d. 2024)
- 22 December – Phoebe Bell, beach and indoor volleyball player

== Deaths ==
- 8 January – John Hargreaves, 50, actor
- 27 February – Laurie Connell, 49, Western Australian businessman
- 28 March – Peter Dombrovskis, 51, photographer
- 7 April – Colleen Clifford, 97, matriarch of Australian theatre
- 8 April – Mick Young, 59, politician
- 23 June – Ray Lindwall, 74, cricketer
- 17 July – Alan McGilvray, 85, cricket commentator
- 20 August – Beverley Whitfield, 42, swimmer
- 28 August – Lennie McPherson, 75, Mr "Big" of modern Australian crime
- 30 August – Dunc Gray, 90, cyclist
- 4 December – Syd Heylen, 74, comedian and actor

== See also ==
- 1996 in Australian television
- List of Australian films of 1996
