= Isabel Letham =

Australian pioneer surfboard rider and swimming instructor

Isabel Ramsay Letham
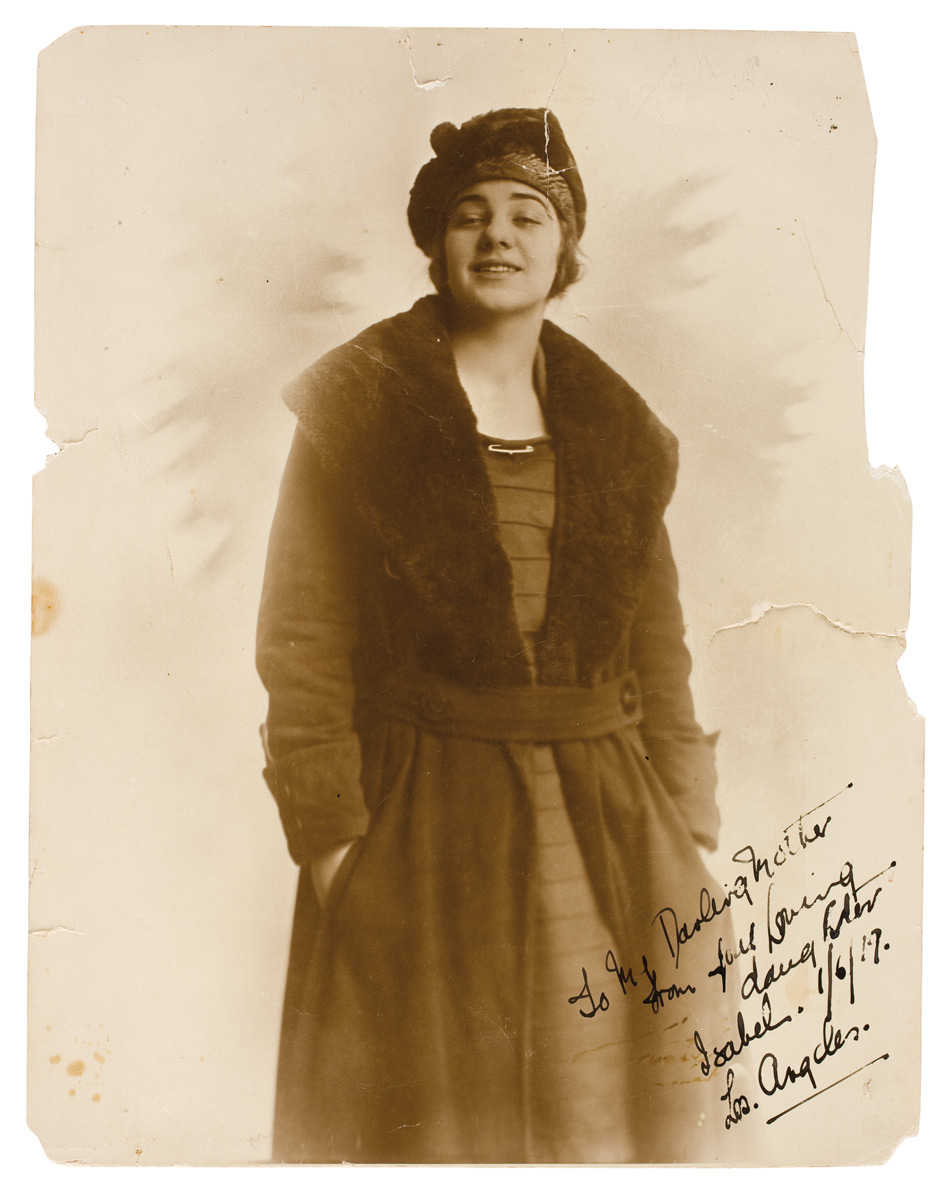
- Letham in 1919
- Born: Isabel Ramsay Letham; 23 May 1899; Chatswood, New South Wales, Australia
- Died: 11 March 1995 (aged 95); F H Rayward Lodge, (Wesley Mission Nursing Home), 16 Beach Street, South Curl Curl, New South Wales, Australia
- Occupations: surfboard rider and swimming instructor
- Known for: Pioneering surfing for women

Isabel Ramsay Letham (23 May 1899 – 11 March 1995) was an Australian pioneer surfboard rider and swimming instructor, renowned as 'the first Australian to ride a surfboard' (although she disputed that claim - Isma Amor of Manly is believed to be the first Australian Female Surfer and Tommy Walker of Manly is believed to be the first Australian Male Surfer). A probably erroneous story has been repeated for years that on 10 January 1915 at Freshwater Beach, Sydney she experimented riding a board in the Hawaiian tradition in tandem with Duke Kahanamoku. This story has been disputed by researchers who have investigated its roots and provenance, and the reality is probably that she did not do so until shortly after, at Dee Why beach in Sydney, on 6 February 1915.

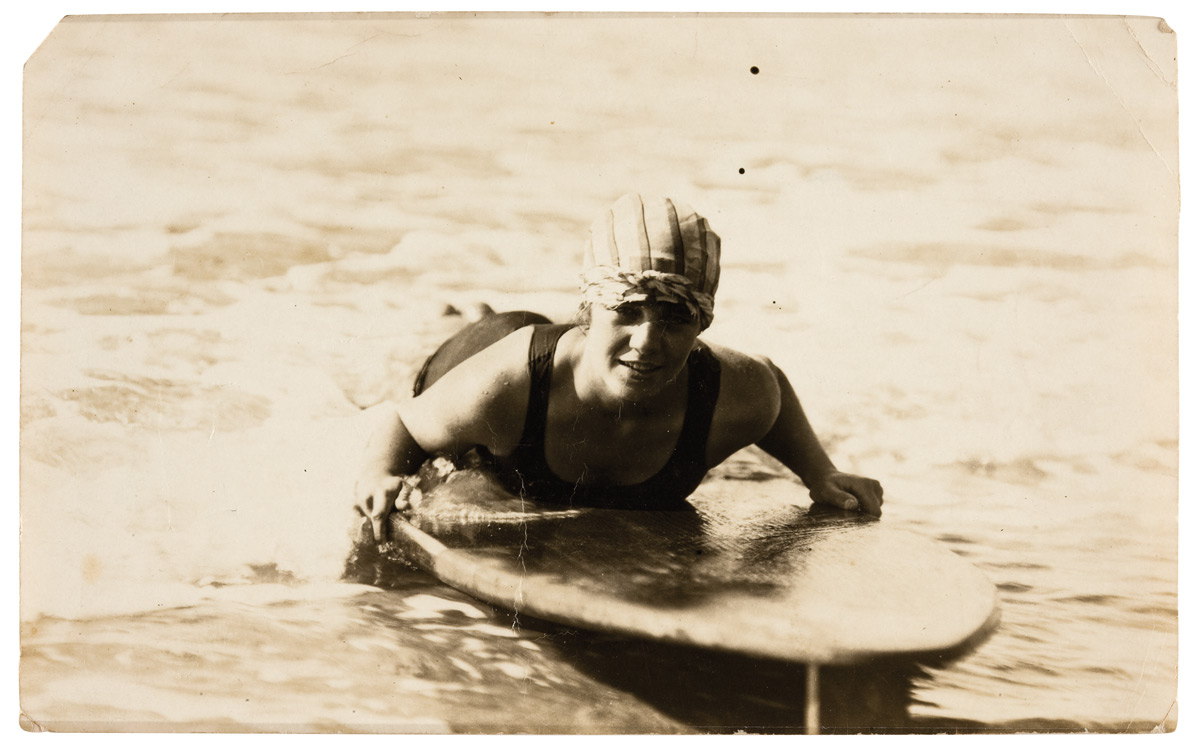
Isabel Letham at South Steyne beach c. 1917

Kahanamoku had been invited to Australia by the NSW Swimming Association. He hadn't brought a surfboard so he made one from sugar pine. At Freshwater Beach, Kahanamoku gave a 3-hour demonstration of "Hawaiian-style surf shooting" to a crowd of several hundred people on 10 January 1915. Australians had been bodyboarding on wooden boards, and bodysurfing.

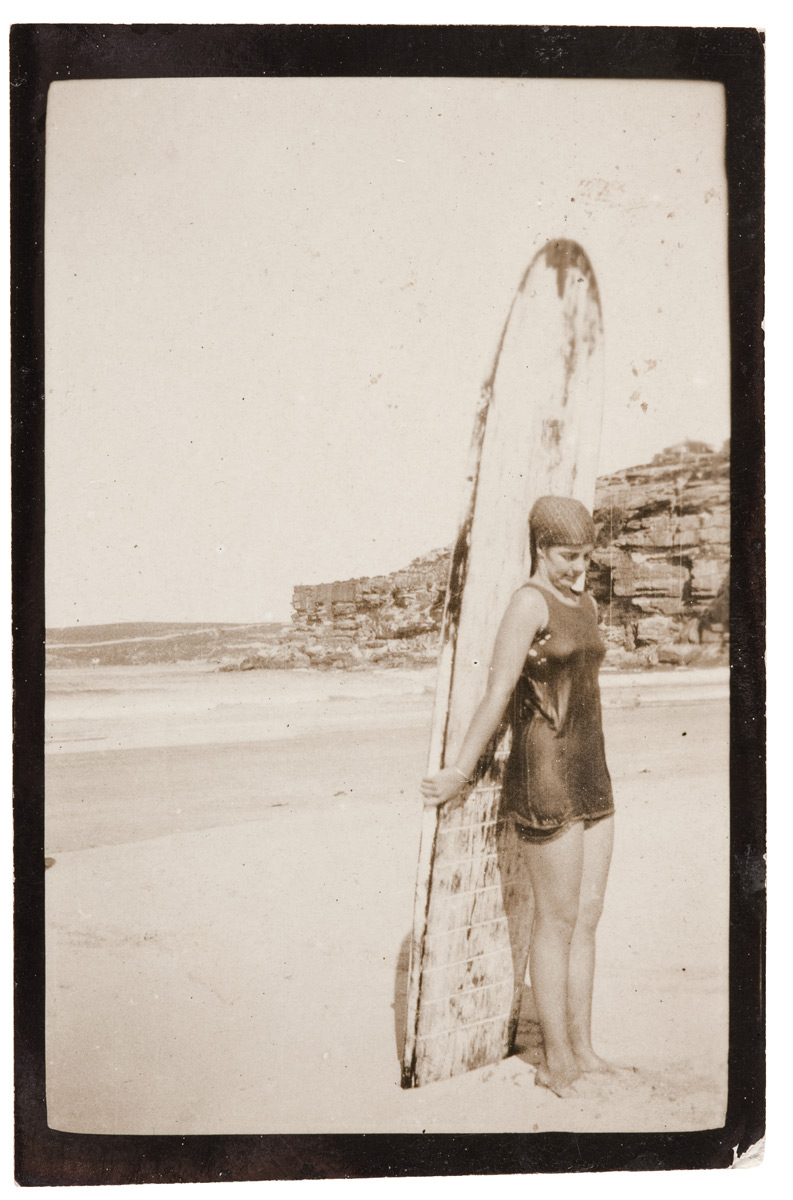
Isabel Letham, Bilgola Beach c. 1916

Again probably apocryphally, the idea has been repeated for years that at the end of the Freshwater Beach session Kahanamoku invited Letham from the crowd for a tandem surfing demonstration. Letham herself later repeated the story, but contemporaneous records indicate that this incident did not take place until the following month at Dee Why beach. In either case, Letham was 15 at the time, but an accomplished swimmer and bodysurfer.

As she later told the story, on the first few waves they paddled for she yelled for him to stop because it felt like going off a cliff. Kahanamoku ignored her cries, went anyway, and hauled her to her feet. They rode at least one wave that day, although repeated re-telling of the story has resulted in an increasing number being reported over the intervening decades. Letham was, as she later said "hooked for life".

Letham went on to become an accomplished surfer, and to teach surfing and swimming. During the 1920s Letham lived in California where she worked as an assistant swimming coach at the University of Southern California and Director of Swimming for the City of San Francisco.

When Letham died in 1995, her ashes were scattered by surfers in the sea off Freshwater Beach.
