= S'Cool Sport =

Australian magazine style sports television show (1996–97)

S'Cool Sport was an Australian magazine style television show for kids. The series focused on sport and was broadcast by the ABC. Beginning in 1996 it was a half hour show broadcast on Saturdays afternoons and repeated on Sundays. In 1997 it was shown on Fridays at 5:30. It was broken into multiple segments looking at different sports, talking to kids who play sport, interviewing professional athletes and others involved in sport.

== See also ==
- List of Australian television series
