= World Class Cuisine =

American television series

World Class Cuisine is an American cooking television series created by Jason Vogel and Arna Vodenos that aired on the Discovery Channel between 1993 and 1997, featuring the talents of professional chefs from around the globe.

John Kavanaugh was a cameraman for the show's duration and directed part of one season and Summer Whitford was the Senior Writer, culinary content expert, and Contributing Editor for the companion cookbook by the same name. Tomi Bednar Landis co-produced one season alongside the Discovery Channel. Somewhat unusual in its rather spartan production style, its content is marked by its stark simplicity. The show presents world-class chefs in their own environment, in professional kitchens as opposed to a production studio. Many of the chefs do not speak English, and their instructions are usually translated, while others choose not to speak at all, leaving the narration in the hands of the presenter. The program commonly adopted a format of a three-course meal consisting of an appetizer, a main course, and a dessert, with three different chefs presenting their own signature dishes. Lisa Simeone took over as the narrator.

The Los Angeles Times reviewed it, along with other cooking shows, stating, "Who knew luxury could be so banal?" The Spokesman-Review noted that "This is a cooking show for serious cooks. ... Most of the dishes are fairly exotic and complicated; some, however, are doable."

== See also ==
- Great Chefs
