= Mikaela Turik =

Canadian womens cricketer (born 1995)

Mikaela Jade Turik (born 16 January 1995 in Sydney, Australia) is a former international cricket player. She played for the Canada women's national cricket team as an all-rounder from 2009 to 2013, including for a period as captain.

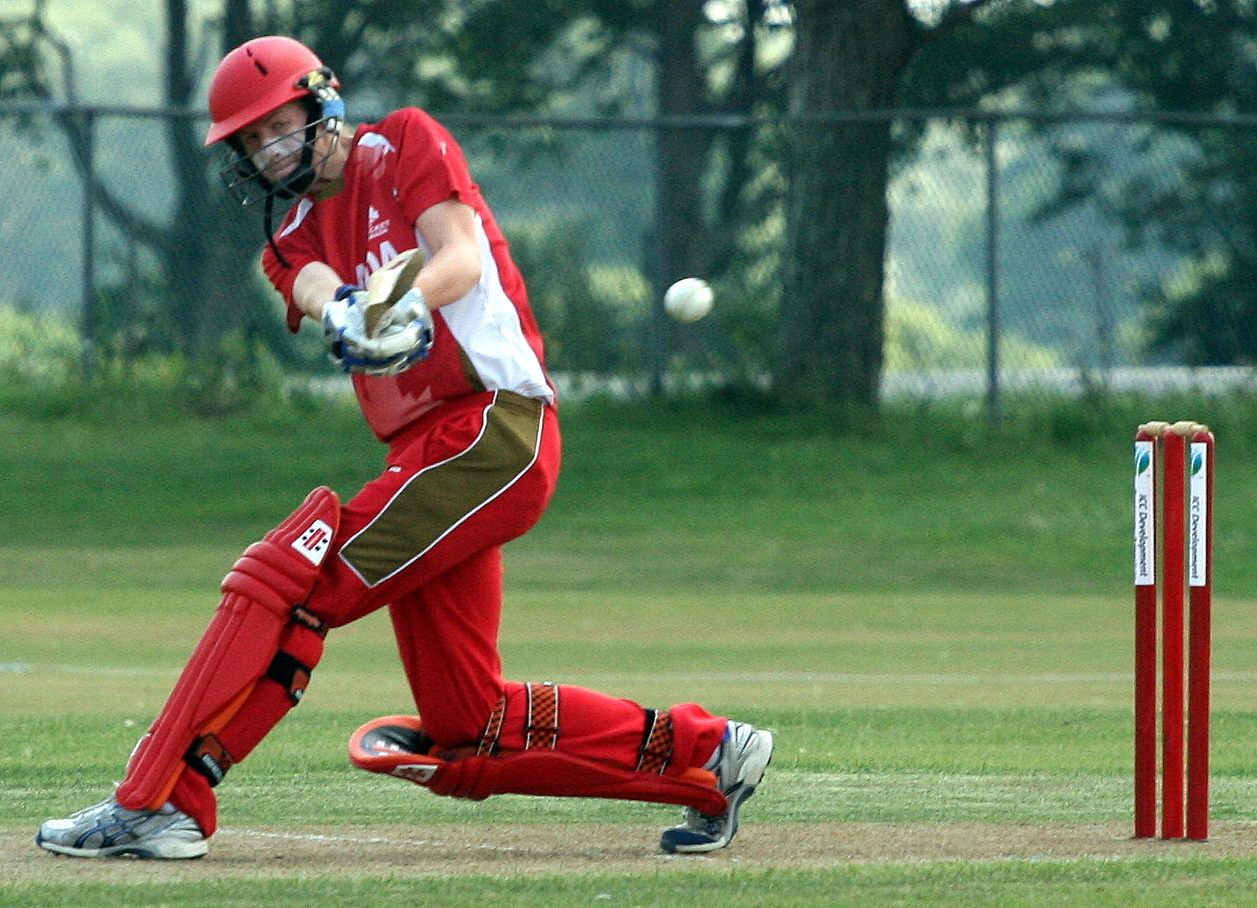
Mikaela Turik batting against the US, ICC ODI, King City, Toronto, July 2010

== Career ==
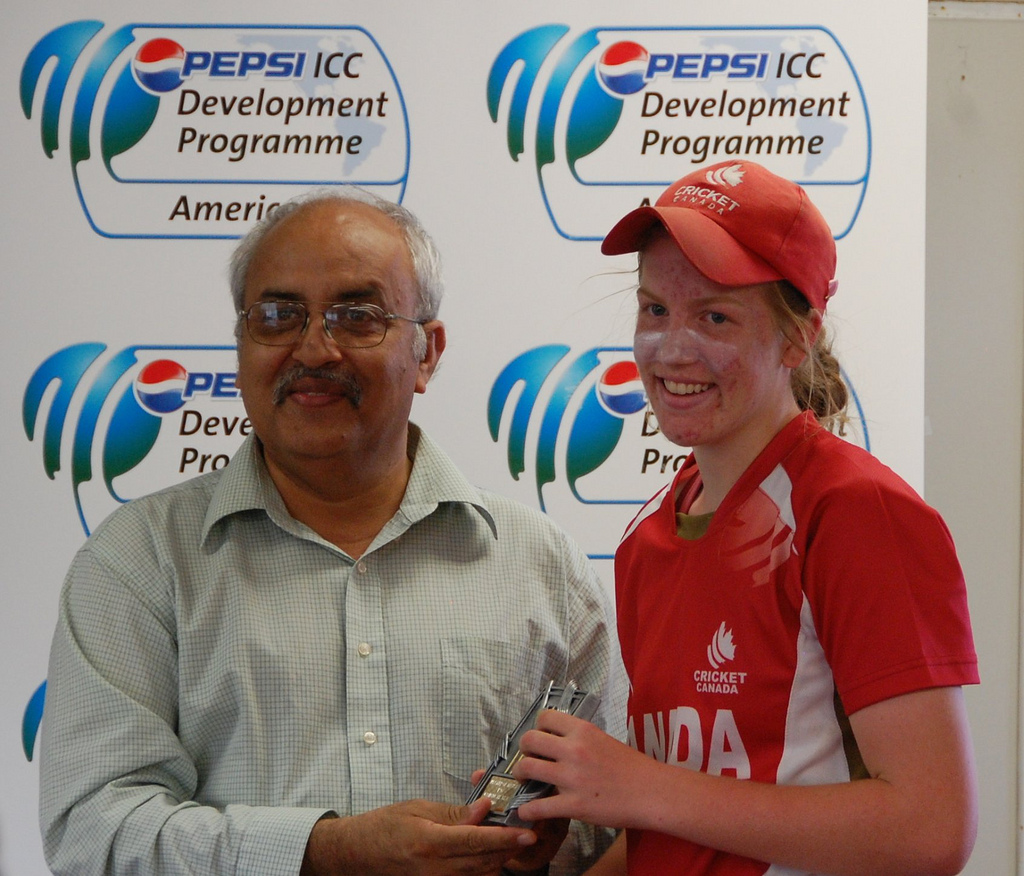
Turik presented the ICC T20 Player of the Match award against the US, King City, Toronto, July 2010

Turik became the youngest female or male cricketer to represent Canada in an open age international championship when she debuted for the Canada national women's cricket team, against Argentina in an ICC One Day match, on 18 May 2009, at the Central Broward Regional Park, in Lauderhill, Florida. Turik was 14 years and 122 days old at the time. Canada went on to win the 2009 ICC America's Cup Championship, with the USA Women runners-up. Turik was selected in an ICC America's Academy development squad.

In Australia, Turik also played for the Cricket NSW U15 state team in the Cricket Australia National U15's championships held in Melbourne, Victoria, from 2 to 7 December 2009. She top scored in a T20 match against Tasmania, played on 7 December, scoring 59 runs and along with teammate Sharon Dass, set a tournament record for an 8th wicket partnership of 92 runs.

In 2010, Turik played for Canada in an international series against the USA Women, held at King City, Toronto, Ontario, from 13 to 17 July. Canada lost three One Day matches, before winning the final two T20 matches. Turik was selected as the "ICC Player of the Match" for helping Canada win the first T20, on 17 July, scoring 45 not out, and taking 1 wicket for 18 runs off her 4 overs bowled. She was also awarded the ICC Canadian MVP for the tournament.

Turik represented Cricket ACT in the Cricket Australia U18 National Championships, held in Ballarat, Victoria, from 18 to 24 January 2012. In the Sydney Cricket Association Women's Competition, (SCAWC), she has played 1st Grade women's cricket for the Northern District Cricket Club, at Mark Taylor Oval, Waitara. She has also played boy's and men's cricket for the Collaroy Plateau Cricket Club.

In March 2012, Turik was selected as vice-captain for Canada in the ICC Americas Women's Division 1 T20 Championship held in the Cayman Islands, from 23 to 28 April 2012. In the opening match of the tournament, Canadian captain, Suthershini Sivanantham, was rested due to an injury, Turik had the honour of captaining Canada for the first time. In doing so Turik at 17 years, 99 days old also became the youngest player, male or female, to captain Canada. The Canadian side batted first against Brazil in the ICC T20 and were 3/181, before restricting Brazil to 8/55 from their 20 overs, for a comprehensive, 126 run victory. Canada went on undefeated to win the ICC Americas T20 Championship in a rain affected tournament. Canada qualified to play in the ICC Women's T20 Cricket World Cup Qualifier, held in Ireland, in July 2013. Turik along with Monali Patel were the two Canadian players selected in the ICC Americas development team.

Turik was again selected by Cricket ACT to compete in the Cricket Australia U18 National Championships, held in Ballarat, Victoria, from 16 to 22 January 2013.

On 23 July 2013, Turik captained the Canadian team against Sri Lanka, in an ICC Women's World Twenty20 Qualifier, in Dublin Ireland.

In January 2019, Turik joined Healthcare Professional Group{{citation needed}}.

== Personal life ==
Turik was born and raised in Sydney, Australia. Her mother is Australian while her father is Canadian and Australian. She has one older brother, Jason. Turik is the granddaughter of Frank Turik, who captained the first B.C. ice hockey team, the Trail Smoke Eaters, to make it to the Memorial Cup. Turik won the Memorial Cup the year after, in the 1945 Memorial Cup, and was the championship's leading scorer, while playing for the Toronto St. Michael's Majors.

Turik attended St. Luke's Grammar School, from pre-Kindergarten and in 2012 completed her Higher School Certificate, (HSC).

== Basketball ==
Turik was the St. Luke's Girls Basketball Captain as well as her Sports House Captain. Turik has won the Basketball Excellence award at St. Luke's for 3 consecutive years and has represented St. Luke's at many sports including cricket, basketball, netball and athletics. In February 2012, Turik helped lead St. Luke's to their third consecutive Association of Independent Co-educational Schools Cup, (AICES). She has also represented the Manly Warringah Basketball Association from U12 – U18 teams, with the U18 team placing 4th in the 2011 Basketball NSW State Championships. She then played for the Manly Warringah Youth League, (U22) team, that plays in the Basketball NSW Waratah League. The Manly team finished the regular season in 3rd place, gaining entry to the State Final Four, whereupon they finished as the State runners-up.

Post high school, Turik has committed to attending and playing basketball for the University of Victoria, (UVic), in Victoria, British Columbia, on an athletic scholarship. The Victoria Vikes Women's basketball team compete in the Canadian Interuniversity Sport championships, (CIS) and have won 9 national championships. The Vike's team is coached by Dani Sinclair, who brings a wealth of experience as a former player for both the McMaster Marauders and the UVic Vikes.
