= List of Australian films of 1995 =

List of Australian films of 1995 contains a detailed list of films that were created in Australia in the year 1995.

== 1995 ==
Title	Director	Cast	Genre	Notes
Funky Unc Needs to Spunk	Funky Unc	Funky Unc Clone, TikTok, Available at Walmart	Short / Action	
All Men Are Liars	Gerard Lee	Toni Pearen, David Price	Comedy	
Angel Baby	Michael Rymer	John Lynch, Jacqueline McKenzie	Drama / Romance	
Audacious	Samantha Lang	Dee Smart, John Polson, Aden Young	Short	
Babe	Chris Noonan	James Cromwell, Magda Szubanski, Zoe Burton, Paul Goddard	Comedy	Won Academy Award for Best Visual Effects
Back of Beyond	Michael Robertson	Paul Mercurio, Colin Friels, John Polson	Thriller	
Bathing Boxes	Kathy Drayton	Karin Altmann, Heather Mitchell, Frances O'Connor	Short	
Billy's Holiday	Richard Wherrett	Max Cullen, Kris McQuade, Tina Bursill	Musical comedy	
The Bounty	John Steven Lasher	Greg Matthews	Short documentary	
Capital V for Virtue	Roland Gallois	Teo Gebert	Short	
Code Blue	Moira Moss	Max Howard, Elizabeth Maywald, John O'Hare	Short	
Dad and Dave: On Our Selection	George Whaley	Leo McKern, Joan Sutherland, Geoffrey Rush	Comedy	
Despondent Divorcee	Jonathan Ogilvie	Roger Norris, Amanda Pearson	Short	
The Existentialist Cowboy's Last Stand	Adam Blaiklock	Michael Pate	Short	
Fido Jones and the Lost Treasure	Harlan Alston	Imron Alston, Ashley Brun, Robert Moody	Short	
The Final Stage	Frank Howson	Abigail, Tommy Dysart, Frank Howson	Comedy	
Flashlight	Garnet Mae	Loene Carmen, Christopher Hiraishi Mae, Garnet Mae	Drama	
Fly Peewee, Fly!	Sally Riley	Duane Johnston, Faye Montgomery, Stan Yarramunua	Short	
Frailejón	Joshua Yeldham	Stephan De Kwiatkowski, Lezanne Deliz, Carmen Duncan	Short	
God I Missed You Baby	Bronwyne Smith	Luke Elliot, Georgina Naidu, Valerie Druce	Short	
Hayride to Hell	Kimble Rendall	Kylie Minogue, Richard Roxburgh	Short	
Hotel Sorrento	Richard Franklin	Caroline Goodall, Caroline Gillmer, Tara Morice	Drama	aka: "Sorrento Beach"
The Journey	Christopher Tuckfield		Documentary	
Ladies Please!	Andrew Saw	Adam Cahill, Kerrin Cahill, Sarah Chadwick	Documentary	
The Last Game	Tom Parrish	Joey Travolta, Sherean Neville, Mike Hamann	Drama / Sport	
The Last True Action Hero	Karen Borger		Documentary	
Lessons in the Language of Love	Scott Patterson	Gabrielle Adkins, Marianne Bryant, Anni Finsterer	Short	Screened at the 1995 Cannes Film Festival
The Life of Harry Dare	Aleksi Vellis	John Moore, Nicholas Hope, Tommy Lewis	Comedy	
Lilian's Story	Jerzy Domaradzki	Ruth Cracknell, Barry Otto, Toni Collette	Drama	
Lucinda, 31	Cherie Nowlan	Joy Smithers, Bruce Hughes, Jane Turner	Short	
Mushrooms	Alan Madden	Julia Blake, Simon Chilvers, Lynette Curran	Comedy / Crime	
Napoleon	Mario Andreacchio	Jamie Croft, Philip Quast	Adventure / Family	Australian-Japanese-American co-production
On the Dead Side	James M. Vernon	David Baldwin, Richard Carter, Gary Day	Crime	
Out	Samantha Lang		Short	
Rainbow's End	Denny Lawrence	Rhona Rees, Ernie Dingo, Shane Connor	Family	
Raskols	Sally Browning		Documentary	
Roses Are Red	Marcella Hayward	Michael Farley, Dina Gillespie, Mary Heard	Short	
Sanctuary	Robin De Crespigny	Steve Bisley, Arky Michael	Drama	
Sex Is a Four Letter Word	Murray Fahey	Joy Smithers, Rhett Walton, Mark Lee	Comedy / Drama	
Shipwreck Coast: The Gelignite Buccaneer	Peter Du Cane		Docu-Drama	
Shipwreck Coast: The Batavia, Wreck, Mutiny and Murder	Peter Du Cane	Duncan Bailey, Pat Baker, Emily Beardsmore	Docu-Drama	
Small Treasures	Sarah Watt	Rachel Griffiths, Maryrose Cuskelly, Leon Teague	Short	
Stitched	Gregor Jordan	David Field, John Polson	Short	
Swerve	Marcus Gale	Roy Billing, Steven Casey	Short	
Swinger	Gregor Jordan	Darren Gilshenan, Lucy Bell, Jerome Ehlers	Short	
Teenage Portraits	Greta Morton		Documentary Short	
The Third Stroke	Daniel Nettheim	David Nettheim, Emma Toomey, Joshua Young	Short	
Tunnel Vision	Clive Fleury	Patsy Kensit, Robert Reynolds, Rebecca Rigg	Thriller	
Under the Gun	Matthew George	Richard Norton, Kathy Long, Jane Badler	Action	
Vacant Possession	Margot Nash	Pamela Rabe, John Stanton, Toni Scanlan	Drama	
Victoria in the Ashes	Emma Freeman	Susie Lindeman, Cameron McAuliffe	Short	
Video Fool for Love	Robert Gibson	Robert Gibson, Gianna Santone, April Ward	Autobiography	
Violet's Visit	Richard Turner	Caleb Packham, May Lloyd, David Franklin	Comedy / Drama	

== See also ==
- 1995 in Australia
- 1995 in Australian television
