= Horizon Learning Channel =

- Country: Australia
- Broadcast area: Australia

Ownership
- Owner: Optus

History
- Launched: 1996
- Closed: Late 1990s

The Horizon Learning Channel had educational material for the whole family, with documentaries, shows for pre-school children, cooking courses for the grown-ups, language study, and a range of other home education programmes.

It also featured specialist children's programming from Australia and overseas. Working closely with the Education Department and curriculum advisers in each state, it also helped create special programming to help students with their courses.
