= List of Australian films of 1996 =

List of Australian films of 1996 contains a detailed list of films created in Australia in the year 1996.

== 1996 ==
Title	Director	Cast	Genre	Notes
Baniyala: The Yirrkala Film Project	Ian Dunlop	Wokuthi Marawali, Mootapuie	Documentary	Filmed at Baniyala, NT
Billal	Tom Zubrycki		Documentary	
The Birds Do a Magnificent Tune	Chris Windmill		Short	
Bits & Pieces	Simon Klaebe	Jeremy Callaghan, Drayton Morley	Short	
Black Man Down	Bill McCrow	Andrew Booth, Karen Crone, David Hudson	Short	
Black Sun	Amanda Jane	Bernard Curry, Raelee Hill, Brigid Kelly	Short	
Body Corporate	Stephen Cummins		Short	
Boy-Girl, Boy-Girl	Stephen Cummins, Ira Sachs, Sara Whiteley		Short	
Brilliant Lies	Richard Franklin	Gia Carides, Anthony LaPaglia, Zoe Carides	Drama	
Cabbie of the Year	Michael Connolly	Steve Adams, Steve Adams, Chris Haywood	Short	
Call Me Sal	Arianna Bosi	Sally Cooper, Jennifer Jarman-Walker, Geoffrey Rush	Short	
Children of the Revolution	Peter Duncan	Judy Davis, Sam Neill, F. Murray Abraham	Comedy / Drama	
Cinema Cinema	Maani Petgar	Mohsen Makhmalbaf, Ulu Grosbard (uncredited), Jennifer Jason Leigh (uncredited)	Documentary	
Cliché	Steve Le Marquand	Steve Le Marquand, Paul Lum	Short	
Come as You Are	Emma-Kate Croghan, Brad McGann	John Bal, Bridget Haire, Ron Walker	Short	
Così	Mark Joffe	Ben Mendelsohn, Barry Otto, Toni Collette	Comedy / Drama	
The Cuckoo	Gerald Thompson		Short	
Dating the Enemy	Megan Simpson Huberman	Guy Pearce, Claudia Karvan, Matt Day, Lisa Hensley, Pippa Grandison	Comedy / Fantasy	
Dead Heart	Nick Parsons	Bryan Brown, Ernie Dingo, Angie Milliken	Drama / Mystery	
Down Rusty Down	John Curran	Tex Perkins, Noah Taylor, Bob Ellis	Short	
Faggots Are for Burning	Barry McKay		Short	
Film Noir	Michael Liu	Giles Morton, Peter Rush, Simon Westaway	Short	
Fistful of Flies	Monica Pellizzari	Dina Panozzo, John Lucantonio, Anna Volska	Drama	
Floating Life	Clara Law	Annette Shun Wah, Annie Yip	Drama	
Flying Over Mother	Michael James Rowland	Ben McIvor, Jennifer Cloher, Luke Quinton	Short	
Freestyle	David Lowe	Mary-Lou Stewart, Roy Billing, Monique Spanbrook	Short	
Happy Little Vegemites: Unauthorized	Colin Mowbray	James McKenna	Short	
Hotel de Love	Craig Rosenberg	Aden Young, Saffron Burrows	Comedy	
Idiot Box	David Caesar	Ben Mendelsohn, Jeremy Sims	Drama	
Indulgence	Glenn Fraser	Angela Maier, Cameron McAuliffe, Kristi Street	Short	
The Inner Sanctuary	Chris Clarke	Brett Climo, Gerard Kennedy, Samuel Johnson	Drama	
It Never Rains	Brad McGann	Kane McNay	Short	
L'Araignée	Brad Hayward		Short	
The Legend of Fred Paterson	Jonathan Dawson	Harold Hopkins	Documentary	
Let Me Die, Again	Leone Knight		Short	
Life	Lawrence Johnston	John Brumpton, David Tredinnick, Kevin Hopkins	Drama	
Little White Lies	Pauline Chan	Mimi Rogers, Andrew McFarlane, Temuera Morrison	Crime / Thriller	
Loaded	Kieran Darcy-Smith, Nash Edgerton	Kieran Darcy-Smith, Joel Edgerton, Nash Edgerton	Short	
Love and Other Catastrophes	Emma-Kate Croghan	Frances O'Connor Alice Garner Radha Mitchell Matthew Dyktynski Matt Day	Comedy / Romance	
Love Serenade	Shirley Barrett	Miranda Otto, Rebecca Frith	Comedy	Screened at the 1996 Cannes Film Festival
Lust and Revenge	Paul Cox	Nicholas Hope, Gosia Dobrowolska, Claudia Karvan	Comedy / Drama	
Margaret Star: A Fall from Grace	Annabelle Murphy		Short	
The Mini-skirted Dynamo	Rivka Hartman	Dora Bialestock, Rivka Hartman, Ian McFadyen	Documentary	
Mr. Reliable	Nadia Tass	Colin Friels, Jacqueline McKenzie, Ken Radley	Comedy	aka: "My Entire Life"
My Forgotten Man	Frank Howson	Guy Pearce, Steven Berkoff, Claudia Karvan	Biography	aka: "Flynn"
My Second Car	Stuart McDonald	Ernie Gray, Kevin Harrington, Tony Rickards	Short	
Natural Justice: Heat	Scott Hartford-Davis	Steve BastoniDavid DaviesPeter Finlay	Drama	
Not Fourteen Again	Gillian Armstrong	Kerry Carlson, Diana Doman, Josie Petersen	Documentary	
Offspring	Richard Ryan	Chantal Contouri, Robert Mammone, Gabrielle Fitzpatrick	Drama / Thriller	
Once	Clea Frost		Short	
Pact			Short	
Page 73	Jeff Darling	Cathy Campbell, Rel Hunt, Joshua Rosenthal	Short	
Parklands	Kathryn Millard	Cate Blanchett, Tony Martin	Drama	
The Phantom	Simon Wincer	Billy Zane, Kristy Swanson, Catherine Zeta-Jones	Action / Afventure	
The Quiet Room	Rolf de Heer	Celine O'Leary, Chloe Ferguson, Paul Blackwell	Drama	Entered into the 1996 Cannes Film Festival; Co-production with Italy and France
Rats in the Ranks	Robin Anderson, Bob Connolly	Larry Hand	Documentary	
River Street	Tony Mahood	Aden Young, Bill Hunter, Essie Davis	Comedy / Drama	
Savageries	Marcella Paolacci	Karen Colston, Hayley Prior, Annie Wilson	Short	
Shine	Scott Hicks	Geoffrey Rush, Armin Mueller-Stahl, Justin Braine	Biography / Drama	
Shooting the Breeze	Christina Andreef	Andrea Moor, Anthony Lawrence	Short	
Spirits of the Carnival	Gregory Read	John Gaden	Documentary	
Susie Is a Fish	Carla Drago		Documentary	
Tease	Hayley Cloake	Cazerine Barry, John Howard	Short	
A Thin Life	Frank Howson	Tommy Dysart	Comedy	
This Film Is a Dog	Jonathan Ogilvie	Quinn Hud, Phoenix Arizona, Peter Johnson	Short	
To Have and to Hold	John Hillcoat	Tchéky Karyo, Rachel Griffiths, Steve Jacobs	Mystery / Thriller	
Tragic But True	Malcolm Burt		Short	
Turning April	Geoff Bennett	Tushka Bergen, Aaron Blabey, Kenneth Welsh	Drama	
Two Bob Mermaid	Darlene Johnson	Carrie Prosser, Tessa Leahy, Jie Pitman	Short	
Uncle	Adam Elliot	William McInnes, John Flaus	Short	
Urban Fairytale	Michelle Mahrer	Arlo Duff, Angela Idealism, Bernd Naber	Short	
What I Have Written	John Hughes	Martin Jacobs, Gillian Jones	Drama	Entered into the 46th Berlin International Film Festival
Whipping Boy	Di Drew	Sigrid Thornton, Temuera Morrison, Tammy Macintosh	Thriller / Drama / Crime	
Wild Australia: The Edge	John Weiley	Hugo Weaving, Mark Baker, Hayley Pero	Short	
The Winner	Alex Cox	Rebecca De Mornay, Vincent D'Onofrio, Richard Edson	Comedy / Crime	
Zone 39	John Tatoulis	Peter Phelps, Carolyn Bock, William Zappa	Sci-Fi	

== See also ==
- 1996 in Australia
- 1996 in Australian television
