= Sarah Mason (surfer) =

New Zealand surfer

Personal information
- Born: 11 April 1995 (age 31) Gisborne, New Zealand

Surfing career
- Sport: Surfing
- Best year: 2010 New Plymouth (SF)
- Major achievements: 2010 New Zealand Women's Open surfing title; 2010 Australasian girls' pro junior under-21 title

Surfing specifications
- Stance: Goofy

Sarah Mason (born 11 April 1995) is a New Zealand-born surfer currently residing in Australia.

On 11 April 2010 (her 15th birthday) Mason won the New Zealand Women's Open surfing title held off New Plymouth, New Zealand. She also gained wildcard entry to New Plymouth's ASP world championship Dream Tour event, held in the same month. On 15 April 2010 she beat world champion Stephanie Gilmore to make it to the quarter-finals of the event. A day later she bet New Zealand No.1 Paige Hareb to advance to the semi-finals, where she lost to Carissa Moore.
