= 1994 in Australian television =

1994 in Australian television lists notable events and debuts in Australian television in 1994 in chronological order as well as ongoing television series which aired that year.

== Events ==
- 18 January – Australian police drama series Blue Heelers premieres on Seven Network.
- 28 January – American animated series Rugrats makes its debut on ABC at 5:30 pm.
- 31 January – American children's action TV series Mighty Morphin' Power Rangers debuts on Seven Network.
- 31 January – A sequel to the Australian family film Clowning Around called Clowning Around II airs on Seven Network.
- February – Derryn Hinch has taken over Ray Martin's place as host of the Australian award-winning daytime talk program Midday.
- 7 February – Nicky Buckley replaces Jo Bailey as Glenn Ridge's co-host on Sale Of The Century, where she would remain for the next 6 years.
- 10 February – American science fiction television series The X-Files makes it debut on Network Ten.
- 11 February – The ABC has signed a deal to sell its children's TV series Bananas in Pyjamas to various countries around the world. The series has been sold for broadcasting in the UK, Cyprus, Zimbabwe, New Zealand, Portugal, Iceland, Canada, Israel, Saudi Arabia, Belgium, the Netherlands, Sweden, Norway, Finland, Denmark, South Africa, Namibia and Ireland. A deal is about to be signed with a Japanese network to air the series and ABC Enterprises executives will fly over to the USA for the New York Toy Fair and talks on how to crack the lucrative US market.
- 27 February – Network Ten launches Heartbreak High, a brand new schoolroom drama which was a spinoff of the 1993 Australian romantic comedy feature film The Heartbreak Kid.
- 28 February – Australian long running children's TV series Mr Squiggle returns to ABC for a brand new series at 3:55 pm.
- 3 March – British long running science fiction series Doctor Who airs on ABC for the last time in its original run at 4:30 am with the fourth and final part of the sixth and final serial of Season 22 Revelation of the Daleks.
- 5 March – American animated series Animaniacs premieres on the Nine Network as part of their What's Up Doc? block.
- 21 March – Final episode of the Australian comedy series Mother and Son airs on ABC.
- 24 March – American sitcom Frasier starring Kelsey Grammer premieres on the Nine Network.
- 27 March – The Animals of Farthing Wood, a British children's animated series based on the books by Colin Dann premieres on ABC at 8:00 am as part of Couch Potato.
- 31 March – Australia's iconic and long running soap Home and Away begins premiering on NBC in Namibia.
- 10 April – Australian children's TV series Lift Off has spawned into a game show titled EC Plays Lift Off with Mr. Fish as the host and only running for 13 episodes. It will air on ABC on every Sunday morning as part of Couch Potato.
- 11 April – Australian children's comedy series The Ferals premieres on ABC.
- 11 April – Michael Tunn, the host of the ABC's Afternoon Show returns with a brand new music series called Loud as a replacement for the weekday afternoon magazine show that was axed in late 1993. The show includes music videos as well as reviews on movies and video games, feature stories on youth culture, musicians talking about their favourite music videos and on location interviews with bands and will be shown from Monday to Thursday at 5:30 pm.
- 13 April – A Country Practice switches over to air on Network Ten following its final air on Seven Network in 1993.
- 16 April – American children's TV series Barney & Friends premieres on Nine Network.
- 30 April – The Tasmanian television market is aggregated, with TasTV (now WIN Television) taking a Nine Network affiliation & Southern Cross taking a dual Seven and Ten affiliation.
- 9 May – Frontline a satirical look at current affairs television from Australian comedy group The D-Generation and starring Rob Sitch as anchor Mike Moore starts airing on the ABC.
- 16 May – A brand new Australian game show for children called A*mazing debuts on Seven Network. Hosted by James Sherry and airing at 4:30 pm, the show pitted teams from two different primary schools against each other during the course of a week. Points gained by each contestant during the week would be totalled up to decide the winning school at the end of each week.
- 20 May – SBS commences transmission in Darwin.
- 23 May – Australia's favourite koala Blinky Bill returns to television with a brand new animated series on ABC at 4:30 pm. The series had previously aired in Germany, Hong Kong, the UK, Singapore, Ireland and on UK forces television before airing in its homeland.
- 1 June - Australian soap opera Home and Away airs on television in the United States for the first time on the country's newly launched cable television channel FX. It would take years to bring the soap opera to America.
- 16 June – Final episode of the Australian music series Loud airs on ABC.
- 20 June – Australian teen game show Vidiot returns to the ABC for a brand new series with Scott McRae taking over as presenter.
- 30 June – ABC has expired the rights to the long running British science fiction series Doctor Who. The series itself will no longer continue to air on the Australian free for air public broadcaster until 2003, but will soon air on cable television on UKTV in 1996. The ABC will also broadcast the television movie of the series in July of the same year.
- 1 August – Melbourne's ATV10 celebrates 30 years of transmission.
- 17 August – Australian comedy series Hey Dad..! hosts its final original episode on Seven Network.
- 18–28 August – The Commonwealth Games are televised live on Network Ten from Victoria, British Columbia, Canada.
- 8 September – ABC debuts The Human Animal, a six-part British nature documentary series written and presented by Desmond Morris described as "a study of human behaviour from a zoological perspective", travels the world to filming the diverse customs and habits of various regions while suggesting common roots.
- 23 September – Iconic Australian drama series Banjo Paterson's The Man From Snowy River: The McGregor Saga starring Andrew Clarke and Wendy Hughes premieres on the Nine Network.
- 29 September – The fourth episode of ABC's The Human Animal includes sexually explicit scenes when it depicted a couple making love by using tiny endoscopic cameras placed inside both bodies to show intimate orifices. It also depicts the insertion of a man's erect penis into a woman's vagina and the subsequent orgasm.
- October – In Neighbours, the Kennedy family (Susan, Karl, Libby, Billy, Mal) arrive at No. 28, Doug and Pam Willis leave for Darwin, Julie Martin is killed in the Murder Mystery Weekend.
- 16 October – The Nine Network rebrands its on-air graphics.
- 19 October – A television special known as The Very Best of the Don Lane Show airs on Nine Network at 8:30 pm. It features Don Lane introducing some of the memorable segments to have come from the popular variety show that ran from 1975 to 1983, including footage of guest stars Mel Brooks, Billy Connolly, James Randi, Charlton Heston, Bob Hope, Liza Minnelli, Robin Williams, Sammy Davis Jr., Peter Allen, John Farnham, Peter Sellers and Johnny O'Keefe. This special was remastered for a DVD release in 2004.
- 5 November – A Country Practice (1981–1993 on Channel 7) revival attempt on Network Ten backfires and is swiftly cancelled due to low ratings.
- 26 November – The popular television character Ossie Ostrich leaves Hey Hey It's Saturday after 23 years as Daryl Somers' co-host. When the show returns in 1995, Somers will host solo.
- The infamous TAC Nightshift commercial depicting A Volkswagen Kombi goes to air on television for the very first time.
- The 1994 FIFA World Cup is broadcast live from the United States and is shown on SBS and Prime Television.
- Community Television starts with long-term trials of stations in Melbourne, Sydney, Brisbane, Adelaide and Perth.
- The ABC purchases an Australian children's television program from the creators of Johnson and Friends called Boffins about tiny alien like creatures called Boffins who spent their days in kitchen cupboards and surrounding areas, trying to discover science behind how the world works. The series was never broadcast in Australia but it did air in several other countries such as Singapore, Israel, Malaysia, Brunei, Pakistan, Sri Lanka, Canada, Africa and the Middle East. The complete series will be released on VHS in Australia the following year by ABC Video and Roadshow Entertainment featuring all thirteen episodes.
- American children's animated series Teenage Mutant Ninja Turtles changes it schedule to mornings as part of Agro's Cartoon Connection on Seven Network.

== Debuts ==
Program	Network	Debut date
Kate Ceberano and Friends	ABC TV	17 January
Blue Heelers	Seven Network	18 January
Level 23	Network Ten	24 January
Alan Jones Live	Network Ten	31 January
Man O Man	Seven Network	5 February
Under the Skin	SBS TV	16 February
The Bob Morrison Show	Nine Network	22 February
Heartbreak High	Network Ten	27 February
The Times	Seven Network	14 March
Denton	Seven Network	15 March
Ballzup!	ABC TV	20 March
Heartland	ABC TV	23 March
The AFL Footy Show	Nine Network	24 March
The Big Byte	SBS TV	24 March
EC Plays Lift Off	ABC TV	10 April
The Reading, Writing Roadshow	ABC TV	11 April
The Ferals	ABC TV	11 April
Loud	ABC TV	11 April
Consumer Power	ABC TV	13 April
The Zone	Nine Network	30 April
Frontline	ABC TV	9 May
Sydney Weekender	Seven Network	14 May
A*mazing	Seven Network	16 May
The Damnation of Harvey McHugh	ABC TV	2 June
Stampede	ABC TV	10 June
Halfway Across the Galaxy and Turn Left	Seven Network	19 June
Strike It Lucky	Nine Network	11 July
The Battlers	Seven Network	13 July
Total Recall	Seven Network	15 August
Ocean Girl	Network Ten	29 August
The NRL Footy Show	Nine Network	1 September
Janus	ABC TV	1 September
Living in the 90s	ABC TV	1 September
Wedlocked	Seven Network	7 September
Banjo Paterson's The Man From Snowy River: The McGregor Saga	Nine Network	23 September
The Liberals: 50 Years of the Federal Party	ABC TV	12 October
Big Girl's Blouse	Seven Network	13 October
Halifax f.p.	Nine Network	9 November
Escape from Jupiter	ABC TV	26 November

=== International Programming ===
Program	Network	Debut date
(United States) States of Mind	SBS TV	2 January
(United States) The Adventures of Super Mario Bros. 3	Nine Network	3 January
(United Kingdom) Great Crimes and Trials of the 20th Century	ABC TV	7 January
(Spain) Sandino	SBS TV	8 January
(United States) The Late Show with David Letterman	Nine Network	12 January
(Denmark) Kings Without Crowns	SBS TV	16 January
(United Kingdom) Coast of Dreams	SBS TV	19 January
(Greece) A Very Merry Widow	SBS TV	19 January
(United States) Super Mario World	Nine Network	20 January
(United Kingdom) Grace & Favour	Network Ten	28 January
(United States) Rugrats	ABC TV	28 January
(United States) / (Japan) Mighty Morphin' Power Rangers	Seven Network	31 January
(United States) Biker Mice from Mars	Network Ten	31 January
(Australia) / (France) / (United States) Clowning Around II	Seven Network	31 January
(United States) Adventures of Sonic the Hedgehog	Network Ten	31 January
(United Kingdom) / (Wales) Funnybones	ABC TV	1 February
(United States) / (United Kingdom) Where's Wally?	ABC TV	2 February
(United States) Missing Persons	Nine Network	2 February
(United States) NYPD Blue	Network Ten	3 February
(United Kingdom) Calling the Shots	ABC TV	3 February
(United States) / (Canada) Eek! The Cat	Network Ten	3 February
(United Kingdom) Anglo-Saxon Attitudes	ABC TV	6 February
(United States) The X-Files	Network Ten	10 February
(United States) Flesh 'n' Blood	Seven Network	13 February
(United States) Doug	Network Ten	13 February
(United States) Davis Rules	Nine Network	17 February
(Canada) Tooth Fairy, Where Are You?	ABC TV	18 February
(United States) A Child's Garden of Verses	ABC TV	18 February
(Canada) Here's How!	ABC TV	22 February
(United Kingdom) To Play the King	ABC TV	24 February
(United Kingdom) Gallowglass	ABC TV	27 February
(United Kingdom) Body & Soul	Nine Network	1 March
(United States) Sightings	Seven Network	1 March
(United Kingdom) Tracey Ullman: A Class Act	ABC TV	2 March
(United States) Animaniacs	Nine Network	5 March
(Canada) Forever Knight	Nine Network	9 March
(United Kingdom) Italianissimo	ABC TV	12 March
(United Kingdom) Ashenden	ABC TV	20 March
(United States) Boy Meets World	Seven Network	23 March
(United States) Dave's World	Nine Network	24 March
(United States) Frasier	Nine Network	24 March
(United Kingdom) / (France) The Animals of Farthing Wood	ABC TV	27 March
(United States) Almost Home	Seven Network	29 March
(United States) Here and Now	Seven Network	30 March
(United Kingdom) Kevin's Cousins	ABC TV	1 April
(United States) Ferris Bueller	Nine Network	1 April
(United States) Out All Night	Nine Network	2 April
(United Kingdom) Blood and Honey	ABC TV	3 April
(Canada) Northwood	ABC TV	11 April
(United States) The Hat Squad	Nine Network	15 April
(United States) Barney & Friends	Nine Network	16 April
(United Kingdom) Old Bear Stories	ABC TV	18 April
(United Kingdom) Rat-a-Tat-Tat	ABC TV	20 April
(Canada) Mathica's Mathshop	ABC TV	20 April
(United States) Walker, Texas Ranger	Nine Network	28 April
(United States) Today's Gourmet	SBS TV	30 April
(United Kingdom) In Suspicious Circumstances	Seven Network	4 May
(United Kingdom) The Full Wax	ABC TV	7 May
(United Kingdom) Hit and Run	SBS TV	11 May
(United States) Grace Under Fire	Seven Network	15 May
(Netherlands) Miffy	ABC TV	16 May
(United States) His and Hers (USA)	Seven Network	17 May
(United Kingdom) The Greedysaurus Gang	ABC TV	23 May
(United States) Lois & Clark: The New Adventures of Superman	Seven Network	25 May
(United Kingdom) Kinsey	ABC TV	30 May
(United States) Discover America: The West	SBS TV	31 May
(United States) Where I Live	Seven Network	3 June
(Canada) Ready or Not	ABC TV	17 June
(Australia) / (New Zealand) / (France) Deepwater Haven	Network Ten	19 June
(United States) Beakman's World	Network Ten	19 June
(United States) Key West	Seven Network	22 June
(United States) Great Scott!	Nine Network	24 June
(United Kingdom) Kevin and Co.	ABC TV	27 June
(United Kingdom) Between the Lines	Seven Network	28 June
(United States) / (Canada) / (France) Madeline (TV series)	ABC TV	28 June
(United Kingdom) Philbert Frog	ABC TV	28 June
(United Kingdom) Behaving Badly	ABC TV	3 July
(United States) / (Canada) / (France) Conan the Adventurer	Network Ten	4 July
(United Kingdom) A Touch of Frost	Seven Network	8 July
(United Kingdom) Murder Most Horrid	ABC TV	11 July
(Canada) The Admiral and the Princess	ABC TV	15 July
(United Kingdom) Teddy Trucks	ABC TV	15 July
(Republic of Ireland) Glenroe	SBS TV	18 July
(France) Supercities	SBS TV	19 July
(United Kingdom) Jo Brand Through the Cakehole	Seven Network	21 July
(Germany) Dolphin Stories	SBS TV	21 July
(Canada) Ooh La La	SBS TV	22 July
(United States) Great Chefs of San Francisco	SBS TV	23 July
(Germany) Switch	SBS TV	26 July
(Wales) / (United Kingdom) Thicker than Water	ABC TV	31 July
(United Kingdom) Do-It-Yourself Mr. Bean	ABC TV	5 August
(United Kingdom) As Time Goes By	ABC TV	8 August
(United States) Knight Rider 2000	Network Ten	10 August
(France) / (Canada) Highlander: The Series	Seven Network	11 August
(United Kingdom) Back to School Mr. Bean	ABC TV	12 August
(United Kingdom) Underbelly (UK)	ABC TV	14 August
(France) / (Italy) Orson and Olivia	ABC TV	19 August
(United States) Space Age: The Quest for Planet Mars	SBS TV	21 August
(United States) SeaQuest DSV	Network Ten	28 August
(United States) Models Inc.	Network Ten	30 August
(United States) Mad About You	Network Ten	30 August
(Canada) / (France) Counterstrike	Network Ten	1 September
(United States) Burke's Law (1994)	Network Ten	2 September
(United Kingdom) The Human Animal	ABC TV	8 September
(United States) Star Trek: Deep Space Nine	Nine Network	10 September
(United Kingdom) / (United States) Tales of the City	ABC TV	11 September
(United States) Café Americain	Seven Network	14 September
(United Kingdom) Ben Elton: The Man from Auntie	ABC TV	17 September
(United States) Good Advice	Nine Network	19 September
(Croatia) Countess Dora	SBS TV	21 September
(United Kingdom) So Haunt Me	ABC TV	22 September
(United Kingdom) The Lodge	ABC TV	26 September
(United Kingdom) Sea Dragon	ABC TV	26 September
(Spain) Seven Signs	SBS TV	27 September
(United Kingdom) Wallace and Gromit	ABC TV	30 September
(United Kingdom) Noel's House Party	Nine Network	30 September
(United States) Exosquad	Network Ten	15 October
(United Kingdom) Mansion: Great Houses of Europe	SBS TV	18 October
(United Kingdom) Discovering Japan	ABC TV	19 October
(New Zealand) Shortland Street	SBS TV	24 October
(United Kingdom) Side by Side	ABC TV	29 October
(United States) The Sinbad Show	Seven Network	1 November
(United Kingdom) The Dreamstone	ABC TV	6 November
(United Kingdom) The Riff Raff Element	ABC TV	12 November
(United Kingdom) Budgie the Little Helicopter	ABC TV	18 November
(United Kingdom) Tumbledown Farm	ABC TV	18 November
(United States) Scarlett	Nine Network	20 November
(United Kingdom) Bottom	ABC TV	22 November
(United States) Ricki Lake	Network Ten	28 November
(United States) The John Larroquette Show	Nine Network	28 November
(United States) Byrds of Paradise	Network Ten	28 November
(United States) Real Stories of the Highway Patrol	Nine Network	30 November
(United States) The Mommies	Seven Network	1 December
(United States) Renegade	Nine Network	1 December
(United States) Diagnosis: Murder	Nine Network	1 December
(United States) The Adventures of Brisco County, Jr.	Nine Network	3 December
(United States) Cobra	Seven Network	3 December
(United States) Babylon 5	Seven Network	3 December
(United States) / (Canada) Kung Fu: The Legend Continues	Nine Network	5 December
(United Kingdom) Sea Trek	ABC TV	8 December
(United Kingdom) Open a Door	ABC TV	11 December
(United States) / (Wales) / (United Kingdom) The Little Engine That Could	ABC TV	11 December
(United Kingdom) Prince Cinders	ABC TV	11 December
(United States) The Nightmare Years	Seven Network	12 December
(United Kingdom) Byker Grove	ABC TV	13 December
(Spain) Three Stars	SBS TV	16 December
(United Kingdom) Rubbish, King of the Jumble	ABC TV	18 December
(United States) Wild Palms	Nine Network	19 December
(Germany) Success	SBS TV	23 December
(United Kingdom) Mole's Christmas	Seven Network	24 December
(United States) Jolly Old St. Nicholas	Seven Network	24 December
(United Kingdom) Noddy and Father Christmas	ABC TV	25 December
(United Kingdom) The Mousehole Cat	ABC TV	25 December
(United States) Brains & Brawn (1993)	Seven Network	26 December
(France) Twins of Destiny	ABC TV	27 December
(United States) What's Up Doc?: A Salute to Bugs Bunny	ABC TV	28 December
(United Kingdom) See How They Grow	ABC TV	29 December
(United Kingdom) The World of Hammer	SBS TV	31 December
(United States) Mighty Max	Seven Network	1994
(United States) / (Canada) Tales from the Cryptkeeper	Network Ten	1994
(United States) Bonkers	Seven Network	1994
(United States) Marsupilami	Seven Network	1994

== Changes to network affiliation ==
This is a list of programs which made their premiere on an Australian television network that had previously premiered on another Australian television network. The networks involved in the switch of allegiances are predominantly both free-to-air networks or both subscription television networks. Programs that have their free-to-air/subscription television premiere, after previously premiering on the opposite platform (free-to air to subscription/subscription to free-to air) are not included. In some cases, programs may still air on the original television network. This occurs predominantly with programs shared between subscription television networks.

=== Domestic ===
Program	New network(s)	Previous network(s)	Date
A Country Practice	Network Ten	Seven Network	13 April
Kaboodle	ABC TV	Seven Network	27 June
Ship to Shore	ABC TV	Nine Network	2 October

=== International ===
Program	New network(s)	Previous network(s)	Date
(United States) Unsolved Mysteries	Network Ten	Seven Network	15 January
(United Kingdom) The Black Adder	ABC TV	Seven Network	8 April
(United Kingdom) Fawlty Towers	Seven Network	ABC TV	14 April
(United Kingdom) Executive Stress	Network Ten	ABC TV	22 April
(United Kingdom) Blackadder II	ABC TV	Seven Network	13 May
(United States) The Wonderful World of Disney	Network Ten	Nine Network, Seven Network	5 June
(United Kingdom) Blackadder the Third	ABC TV	Seven Network	10 June
(United Kingdom) Blackadder Goes Forth	ABC TV	Seven Network	24 June
(United Kingdom) Woof!	ABC TV	Nine Network	9 October
(Canada) The Woman Who Raised a Bear as Her Son	ABC TV	SBS TV	11 December
(United Kingdom) Blackadder's Christmas Carol	ABC TV	Seven Network	24 December

== Specials ==
Program	Channel	Debut date
(United States) No Cure for Cancer	Nine Network	6 April

== Television ==
ABC TV

- Mr. Squiggle and Friends (1959–1999)
- Four Corners (1961–present)
- Rage (1987–beyond)
- G.P. (1989–1996)
- Foreign Correspondent (1992–present)
- The Damnation of Harvey McHugh (1994)

Seven Network

- Wheel of Fortune (1981–1996, 1996–2003, 2004-beyond)
- A Country Practice (1981–1994)
- Home and Away (1988–present)
- Family Feud (1988–1996)
- Real Life (1992–1994)
- The Great Outdoors (1993–2006, 2007)
- Full Frontal (1993–present)

Nine Network

- Sunday (1981–2008)
- Today (1982 – present)
- Sale of the Century (1980–2001)
- A Current Affair (1971–1978, 1988–2005, 2006–present)
- Hey Hey It's Saturday (1971–1999)
- The Midday Show (1973–1998)
- 60 Minutes (1979–present)
- The Flying Doctors (1986–1991)
- Australia's Funniest Home Video Show (1990–2000, 2000–2004, 2005–present)
- Hey Hey It's Saturday (1971–1999)
- Getaway (1992–present)
- Our House (1993–2001)
- Money (1993–2000)

Network Ten

- Neighbours (1985 – present)
- E Street (1989–1993)
- Good Morning Australia with Bert Newton (1991–2005)
- Sports Tonight (1993–2011)

== Ending this year ==
Date	Show	Channel	Debut
22 January	Let the Blood Run Free	Channel Ten	1990
4 February	Supermarket Sweep	Channel Nine	1992
16 March	Newlyweds	Channel Seven	1993
20 March	Kideo	ABC	1993
21 March	Mother and Son	ABC	1984
28 April	Alan Jones Live	Channel Ten	31 January 1994
4 May	Under the Skin	SBS	16 February 1994
13 May	Blockbusters	Channel Seven	1991
27 May	All in a Day's Work	ABC	1992
1 June	Heartland	ABC	23 March 1994
16 June	Loud	ABC	11 April 1994
27 June	The Adventures of Blinky Bill	ABC	23 May 1994
3 July	EC Plays Lift Off	ABC	10 April 1994
8 July	Paradise Beach	Channel Nine	1993
16 August	The Bob Morrison Show	Channel Nine	22 February 1994
17 August	Hey Dad...!	Channel Seven	1987
18 August	The Damnation of Harvey McHugh	ABC	2 June 1994
14 October	Strike It Lucky	Channel Nine	11 July 1994
5 November	A Country Practice	Channel Ten (Channel Seven, 1981–1993)	18 April 1994
25 November	Man O Man	Channel Seven	5 February 1994
1 December	Real Life	Channel Seven	1992
9 December	Stampede	ABC	10 June 1994
14 December	Live and Sweaty	ABC	1991
24 December	Video Smash Hits	Channel Seven	1990

== See also ==
- 1994 in Australia
- List of Australian films of 1994
