= Blockbusters (British game show) =

British television game show

- Title screen (1987–93)
- Also known as: All New Blockbusters (2012)
- Genre: Quiz show
- Created by: Steve Ryan; Mark Goodson
- Presented by: Bob Holness; Michael Aspel; Liza Tarbuck; Simon Mayo; Dara Ó Briain
- Announcer: Andrew Lodge; Peter Tomlinson; Susan Rae; Dan Strauss; Simon Mattacks
- Theme music composer: Ed Welch (1983–95, 2000–01); Paul Boross (1997); Rage Music (2012); Marc Sylvan (2019); Richard Jacques (2019)
- Country of origin: United Kingdom
- Original language: English
- No. of series: 10 (ITV); 2 (Sky One); 1 (BBC Two); 1 (Challenge); 2 (Comedy Central)
- No. of episodes: 1,160 (ITV); 280 (Sky One); 60 (BBC Two); 41 (Challenge); 20 (Comedy Central)

Production
- Production locations: ATV Elstree (1983); Television House (1984–89, 90–95); Central House (1989–90); Granada Studios (1997); The Leeds Studios (2000–01); Sky Campus (2012); BBC Elstree Centre (2019)
- Running time: 30 minutes
- Production companies: Central in association with Talbot Television and Goodson-Todman Productions (1983–95); Fremantle (UK) Productions and BBC North (1997); Grundy (2000–01); Thames (2012, 2019)

Original release
- Network: ITV
- Release: 29 August 1983 – 19 May 1993
- Network: Sky One
- Release: 18 April 1994 – 17 February 1995
- Release: 30 October 2000 – 23 March 2001
- Network: BBC Two
- Release: 31 March – 28 August 1997
- Network: Challenge
- Release: 14 May – 3 August 2012
- Network: Comedy Central
- Release: 21 March – 5 December 2019

Related
- Blockbusters (American game show)

Blockbusters is a British television quiz show based upon an American quiz show of the same name. A solo player and a team of two answer trivia questions, clued up with an initial letter of the answer, to complete a path across or down a game board of hexagons.

The programme premiered on 29 August 1983 on ITV and ran for ten series, ending on 19 May 1993. It has since been revived for four additional series, the most recent of which was a comedy version hosted by Dara Ó Briain, which aired on Comedy Central from 21 March to 5 December 2019.

== Background ==
Blockbusters was created by Mark Goodson-Bill Todman Productions and originated as an American series in 1980. The UK version was created after Central Independent Television producer Graham C. Williams spotted the show in 1981 and produced a pilot in 1982. The difference was that instead of adults, who appeared on the American edition, the UK edition was produced for sixth formers.

Bob Holness was the original presenter staying on for the first ten series of the first incarnation and a 1994 revival on Sky One. Holness commented in 1988: "When Central TV were looking for someone to host Blockbusters I was thought of. It was remembered that I'd done TV programmes of much the same sort, such as Junior Criss Cross Quiz which I compered in the 1960s and which was also a question and answer show. One led to the other." A 1997 edition featuring adults was produced for one series on BBC Two with Michael Aspel presenting. Sky One brought Blockbusters back under its original rules in 2000 with Liza Tarbuck at the helm. The Challenge series was presented by Simon Mayo, and the Comedy Central series was presented by Dara Ó Briain.

Contestants were allowed to do a hand jive during the end credits of the Friday episode of each broadcast week. The hand jive first appeared in 1986 after one of the contestants was bored while sitting through filming several shows a day waiting for his turn. It lasted for the rest of the original series' run. The hand-clapping sequence was referenced by Half Man Half Biscuit in their 1991 song "Hedley Verityesque".

The original game board was powered using 40 slide projectors, each with its own set of slides for the different Letters and Gold Run questions, and took up the entire height of the studio. Slides were preloaded onto carousels with enough slides for about 3 – 5 shows. Carousels took about 30 minutes to change over. There were 15 different board combinations (5 sets X 3 games per match) which meant the same letter combinations would reappear. The letter 'Q' was only on one board, the letter 'Y' on two boards. All 15 boards followed in the same sequence; if the same player/team won a match with victories in the first two games, the third one was skipped and the projectors were advanced directly to the Gold Run.

In 1987 and 1988, readers of TVTimes voted the series the most popular quiz show on television.

=== Theme music ===
The original theme music was written by Ed Welch, who also updated the music for the second Sky series in 2001. The first Sky series kept the same opening titles used from 1987 on the original ITV run (as it continued to be produced by Central). The original theme in C major was an upbeat pop track incorporating piano, strings, drum machine, and various other 1980s synthesized sounds reminiscent of the day – the four-note opening motif of Beethoven's 5th Symphony is mixed into the theme at the precise moment the composer's head appears on a flipping hexagon in the 1983 opening sequence (this sequence was replaced in 1987, see below).

The BBC version in 1997 used a piece of music written by Henry Marsh and Paul Boross. Rage Music created the version used by Challenge, which is an updated version of the original theme, primarily using an electric guitar. Marc Sylvan and Richard Jacques updated the original theme for the Comedy Central version.

=== Title sequences ===
The original 1983–87 title sequence featured flipping hexagons with various images on them running down an encyclopedia page. The title sequence used from 1987 to 1993 is a city, paying homage to science-fiction films such as Metropolis (1927) and Blade Runner (1982). In the 1994 Sky series, the opening titles were cut short, not featuring the hexagons flying over the studio like the 1987–93 titles.

The title sequence used in the 1997 series with a completely different theme tune (although as mentioned above, it might have been similar to the original theme but with several notes swapped around) featured a golden head with hexagons showing clips. The title sequence used in 2000–01 featured people throwing and catching the letters that spell "Blockbusters" using the Ed Welch theme again.

The 2012 title sequence featured references to all previous title sequences, mainly hexagons – but also with more subtle features like the golden head (as seen in the 1997 BBC version), the planet Earth and a city-like structure as seen in the popularised 1987–95 versions. The 2019 title sequence featured hexagon outlines on a hexagon landscape.

== Main game ==
Screenshot from the 1987–95 titles showing the game board without letters

Like the 1980 U.S. version, a solo player competed against a pair of contestants. The game board consisted of 20 interlocking yellow hexagons, arranged in five columns of four. Each hexagon contained a letter of the alphabet (except X and Z, although letter Z appeared occasionally during the Gold Run). A contestant would choose one of the letters and would be asked a general-knowledge trivia question whose correct answer began with the chosen letter. (A typical question might be, "What 'P' is a musical instrument with 88 keys?" The answer would be a piano.) The phrasing that contestants would use to ask for a letter has entered the language and is frequently heard to this day. It is also the source of a pun – "Can I have a 'P' please, Bob?"; 'having a pee' being slang for urinating.

The game board is designed in such a way that a tied game was not a possible finishing result. Even if all 20 hexagons were filled (which did occur at least twice, once in the first series, and once in the first Sky version) there would always be a winner.

The game began with a toss-up question to play for control of the board, starting with a letter that was chosen at random. The teams or players could buzz in during the middle of reading a question. If a player or team got the correct answer, they gained control of that hexagon and were given the chance to choose another one. If the contestant answered incorrectly, the opposing team or player was given a chance to answer it after the host re-read the question. If nobody answered it correctly, the host asked another question whose answer began with that same letter. Each correct answer won £5. In the case of the two-player team, each player won whatever money the team accumulated.

The solo player attempted to complete a vertical connection of white hexagons from the top of the board to the bottom; that required at least four correct answers. The pair attempted to connect a path from left to right with blue hexagons (purple during the Aspel era), requiring at least five spaces. The first side to connect their path won the game, at which point a musical theme would play and the host would say "That's Blockbusters!" The first player or team to win two games won the match. When either party was one correct answer away from completing their path, the hexagons forming their path would flash to indicate this. If both were one correct answer away, all lit hexagons on the board would flash, indicating that the situation was effectively "Blockbusters either way" (later referred to as a "mutual space" on the board), and the next player to give a correct answer would win the game unless the contestant chose a panel which would not give them the win, which was sometimes used as a safety tactic to avoid handing the initiative to the opponent in case they gave the wrong answer.

All players received a "Blockbusters" Concise Oxford Dictionary and sweatshirt in the original ITV series. By 1985, the Blockbusters computer game was added. Within a year, the sweatshirt had been replaced by a "Blockbusters" branded cardigan in a choice of colours and a "Blockbusters" embossed filofax accompanied the dictionary (replaced by an electronic organizer by 1988). In the first Sky One series in 1994, it was a Blockbusters Encyclopedia and T-shirt. In the BBC Two 1997 series, it was a fountain pen. In the second Sky One series, it was a Blockbusters Dictionary and a Britannica CD-ROM. In the Challenge series, it was an Elonex E-book reader. In the Comedy Central series, it was a Blockbusters-branded hoodie and "reusable cup".

=== Gold Run ===
The winner of the match went on to play the Gold Run bonus round; if the pair won, only one player on the team could play, with the turns alternating at each Gold Run. The board consisted of a pattern of green hexagons similar to that of the main game, but the hexagons had 2 to 4 letters inside them; those letters were the initials of the correct answer. (For instance, if a contestant chose "BS" and the host said "Where people kiss in Ireland", the correct answer would be "Blarney Stone.") When the contestant guessed correctly, the hexagon turned gold. However, if the contestant passed, it turned black, blocking the player's path; it was then up to the contestant to work around it. If a contestant answered incorrectly, they were entitled to keep on guessing until they either got it correct, or wished to pass. The object was to horizontally connect the left and right sides of the board within 60 seconds. If a player blocked off all possible horizontal connections, the object simply was to answer as many questions as possible in the remaining time.

If the players were successful they won a special prize. If the Gold Run was not won, each correct answer paid £10. Defending champions could keep going for up to five matches undefeated, in order to win an even bigger prize. From the seventh ITV series, it was reduced to three, so that more contestants could take part over the course of a series. In the first Sky One series this was changed back up to five matches and reduced to three again on BBC Two. In the second Sky One series, it increased to five again. For the Challenge series, the maximum amount remained at five matches.

A famous short piece of music (three sharp notes on a synth-like horn in a slapstick style) was played if a contestant ran out of time on a Gold Run, often producing amused reactions in the studio; the same three notes played on an electric guitar act as the time's-up buzzer on the Challenge version.

=== Champion Blockbusters ===
Four series of Champion Blockbusters were made from 1987 to 1990, in which gold-run winners were invited to return to battle against other gold-run winners.

== Other versions ==
=== Sky One ===
In 1994, Sky One created a new series with original host, Bob Holness. It was produced by Central, which had made the programme since 1983, and sponsored by Thomas Cook. This series featured a bonus question for any player who chose a particular letter and correctly answered that question, thereby earning the right to answer a £5 follow-up question. Sky One brought the series back again in 2000, this time produced by Grundy (which owned the format) and presented by Liza Tarbuck, but it did not capture the same degree of popularity as the Holness incarnation. The format stayed the same in both versions, and both versions involved sixth formers.

=== BBC Two ===
BBC Two used adult contestants, instead of sixth formers. This version was broadcast in 1997 and presented by Michael Aspel; the show stayed with the same format. Famous contestants included Stephen Merchant.

This is the only version to use purple hexagons; all other versions still used blue to represent the pair of players. The solo player still played white hexagons. The Gold Run used a blue background in this version and the Liza Tarbuck version.

Champions in the Aspel era were limited to three wins before retiring undefeated.

=== Gameshow Marathon ===
On 14 April 2007 at 20:40, Vernon Kay hosted a networked edition of Gameshow Marathon on ITV1 in which celebrity contestants revived the classic 1980s Holness version of the show. It also featured an edited version of the show's opening titles.

=== Challenge ===
Title screen for Challenge version of the show

It was announced on 10 November 2011 that game show channel Challenge would revive the show in 2012, under the name "All New Blockbusters", with adult contestants rather than students. Forty episodes were recorded from 9 to 19 February 2012 with Simon Mayo hosting the show.

The series started airing on 14 May 2012, with the first episode dedicated to the memory of original host Bob Holness, who died on 6 January 2012. The series also featured contestant Claire Scott who made her third appearance on Blockbusters.

The show aired at 20:00 every weekday with an omnibus showing split over Saturday and Sunday mornings, plus a repeat showing of the previous night's episode at 17:00. The series was put on hold for a few weeks and resumed transmission on 9 July 2012, starting with a celebrity special featuring Konnie Huq (who had previously been on the original Blockbusters) amongst others. During the break, the first 20 episodes were repeated, with the "All New" removed from the title. Subsequent repeats also removed the "All New" prefix.

=== Comedy Central ===
On 22 October 2018, it was reported that Blockbusters would return once again. Produced by Thames TV with the same format. It was announced on 3 December 2018 that Dara Ó Briain would host the revived version for Comedy Central. Twenty new episodes, broadcast over two series, were recorded in the winter of 2018 and included two celebrity specials. The first episode aired on 21 March 2019.

The format has been changed so that each episode is a standalone contest between a complete panel of three contestants. The prize money has been increased from earlier incarnations to £20 per correct answer in the main game (£100 for the celebrity edition) and £50 per correct answer in an unsuccessful Gold Run (£150 for the celebrity edition). Spot prizes exist in this series, occurring once per episode when a certain hex is selected. If each side wins one game each, the deciding game of past formats has been replaced with a sudden-death playoff entitled the Hexagon Standoff. The two teams try to answer one question, if they get it correct, they go to the Gold Run, however, if they answer incorrectly the opposition goes through. In the Gold Run, the contestant has a choice of two categories for their question board. This version uses a white background during the Gold Run and passes turn the space dark blue.

== Merchandise ==
Blockbusters spawned a number of items of merchandise. 12 quiz books were released from the show which also led to a spin-off: "Blockbusters Gold Run Volumes 1–5" being produced.

In 1986, Waddingtons created a board game version of the show, which was named Game of the Year in 1986 by The British Association of Toy Retailers. This led to several successful spin offs; a "Gold Run" Card Game, a Junior Blockbusters board game (a children's edition) and a Super Blockbusters board game (essentially, a second edition standard game with its own set of "Gold Run" cards). A computer game version of the show was also created for the Amstrad CPC, BBC Micro, Commodore 64 and ZX Spectrum.

In 2006, a DVD game based on the show was released by Circle Studio under license from FremantleMedia, with Bob Holness reprising his position at the helm. The DVD is based on the same format as the TV show, with a virtual set design and game graphics matching the original version of the programme.

In 2012, FremantleMedia's gaming division launched an online slot game based on the British game show. The game is featured at many of the UK's leading gambling sites, including Sky Vegas and Bet365.

== Transmissions ==
=== Bob Holness ===
==== Original ====
Series	Start date	End date	Episodes
1	29 August 1983	4 November 1983	50
2*	27 August 1984	22 January 1985	120*
3	26 August 1985	24 January 1986	120
4	25 August 1986	23 January 1987	120
5	4 September 1987	12 February 1988	120
6	2 September 1988	10 February 1989	120
7	2 January 1990	16 October 1990	120
8	17 October 1990	28 August 1991	136
9	29 August 1991	26 August 1992	150
10	31 August 1992	19 May 1993	104
11	18 April 1994	17 February 1995	180

- Series 2 & 3 were actually merged into one with the first 71 episodes as Series 2 and the last 49 episodes as Series 3.

==== Champion Blockbusters ====
Series	Start date	End date	Episodes
1	18 July 1987	22 August 1987	6
2	23 July 1988	27 August 1988	6
3	15 July 1989	19 August 1989	6
4	21 July 1990	25 August 1990	6

=== Michael Aspel ===
Series	Start date	End date	Episodes
1	31 March 1997	28 August 1997	60

=== Liza Tarbuck ===
Series	Start date	End date	Episodes
1	30 October 2000	23 March 2001	100

=== Simon Mayo ===
Series	Start date	End date	Episodes
1	14 May 2012	3 August 2012	41

=== Dara O Briain ===
Series	Start date	End date	Episodes
1	21 March 2019	23 May 2019	10
2	26 September 2019	5 December 2019	10

==== Regional transmissions information ====
Blockbusters was one of the first British game shows to run in a 'straddling' format, which allowed for games to last a different length of time, meaning that episodes would often begin and end mid-game, and matches often crossed over into two episodes. The show was generally screened at 5:15 pm Monday to Friday, filling the half-hour timeslot between Children's ITV and the ITN News at 5:45, with a similar timeslot allocated on Saturdays for a while. The show was always aired on the ITV network, although the first series was repeated on Channel 4 during the summer of 1984, in the Countdown slot. Blockbusters was never networked across ITV's sixteen regions, this meant that it was occasionally possible to retune the television to a neighbouring region and watch a different episode. Blockbusters did share its time slot with other game shows such as Ask No Questions, Connections, and Winner Takes All. Episodes were recorded in two blocks one during the summer and another during November.

===== 1983 =====
All regions aired Series 1, some stations moved Blockbusters to an earlier slot because the 5:15 pm slot was taken up by soap operas.

- Border, Central, Granada, HTV, TVS, UTV and Yorkshire: Started on 29 August and finished on 4 November 1983. Mondays to Fridays at 5:15pm.
- Anglia, Channel, Grampian, Scottish, Thames and TSW: Started on 5 September and finished on 11 November 1983. Mondays to Fridays at 3:30pm.
- Tyne Tees: Started on 5 September and finished on 11 November 1983. Mondays to Fridays at 3:30pm. Switched to 5:15pm beginning 17 October.

===== 1984–88 =====
- Border, Central, Granada, HTV, Tyne Tees, UTV and Yorkshire: Mondays to Fridays at 5:15pm and Saturdays at 5:05pm.
- Anglia, Grampian, and Scottish: Wednesdays to Fridays at 5:15pm and Saturdays at 5:05pm. Mondays and Tuesdays were filled with Emmerdale Farm. STV had the series at 3:30 for the first 5 weeks in 1984 as Crossroads held the 5:15 slot, but that changed by 10 October 1984. In 1987, Series 5 was held back until 12 September. In early 1988, Anglia moved the series to 6 days a week, and completed the series in March, while Grampian and STV completed the series on 19 April 1988.
- Thames/LWT: Wednesdays to Fridays at 5:15pm and Saturdays at 5:05pm. It was later changed in September 1985 from Mondays to Wednesdays and Fridays to Saturdays at 5:15 pm.
- TVS: Wednesdays to Fridays at 5:15pm and Saturdays at 5:05pm. Mondays and Tuesdays were filled with Sons and Daughters. From Series 5, TVS switched to Mondays to Fridays at 5:15 pm and Saturdays at 5:05 pm.
- TSW: Most of Series 2 was not transmitted because the 5.15pm slot was taken up by Crossroads, The Young Doctors and Emmerdale Farm, which later moved into early peak time in 1985 (as it was on Thames). 49 episodes of Series 2 aired in the mornings during the summer holiday (Mondays to Saturdays) from 1 July to 24 August 1985. Series 3 aired on Mondays, Fridays, and Saturdays at 5:15 pm. Series 4 and 5 aired on Thursdays, Fridays, and Saturdays at 5:15 pm.
- Channel: Same as TSW's schedule until January 1986, it was then switched to TVS's schedules. This meant that approximately 16–20 episodes were skipped as TVS was further ahead.

===== 1988–89 =====
- All regions except TSW broadcast the show from 2 September 1988 to 10 February 1989. Mondays to Fridays at 5:15 pm and Saturdays at 5:05 pm. However, Anglia and Scottish aired some episodes on Sundays instead of Saturdays.
- TSW: Started on 3 October 1988 and finished on 10 February 1989. Mondays to Fridays at 5:15 pm and Saturdays at 5:05 pm.
- No episodes aired on ITV between 19 September to 3 October due to the 1988 Summer Olympics.

===== 1990–92 =====
The show was delayed by all ITV regions until January 1990 as no slots were available to air the show. This was because Home and Away took over the 5:10 pm slot and Emmerdale was now being aired at 6:30 pm, before it was moved to 7:00 pm in January 1990. Anglia, Central and TSW were airing repeats from September to December 1989.

- Anglia, Central and Thames: Blockbusters aired three times a week from January 1990 onwards on Tuesdays to Thursdays at 5:10pm and aired Home and Away at 6:00pm. Days of the week changed and additional episodes were added as well to make it four per week on occasions.
- LWT: No longer aired any episodes from this point onwards.
- Scottish: Tuesdays and Thursdays at 6:30 pm from 3 January to April 1990. From May 1990, it was moved to a daytime slot around 1:30 pm, with the number of episodes fluctuating from none to up to four from this point onwards.
- Grampian: from 3 January 1990, Wednesdays and Thursdays at 6:30 pm.
- Border, Granada, HTV, TVS, TSW, Tyne Tees, UTV and Yorkshire: Tuesdays to Thursdays at 6:30pm.

Granada moved the time slots around during this period, In Autumn 1990, the series was moved to 5:10 pm, on occasion the series moved to 3:25 pm to allow episodes of Families to have the 5:10 pm slot. The series was moved again to 6:00 pm from Wednesdays to Fridays in 1992. UTV reduced its time slots to one episode a week from January to October 1992, then from 26 October 1992, it was aired at 3:20 pm from Mondays to Fridays. TVS reduced its time slots to two episodes a week for most of 1990, but during 1991–92, it went back to three episodes plus an additional episode around Saturday lunchtimes. TSW also dropped its time slots to two episodes per week every so often; however, in a bid to catch back up the series, it was moved to 5:10 pm from Mondays to Fridays in September 1992. For around 18 months in 1991–92, Tyne Tees started airing more local output in the 6:30 pm time slot, which resulted in fewer episodes per week. When Tyne Tees and Yorkshire decided to merge their scheduling in January 1993, Tyne Tees increased its episode output to catch up (In November 1992, it was airing four times a week on Mondays, Wednesdays, Thursdays, and Fridays), but had to drop over 50 episodes.

===== 1993 =====
Many new ITV companies came into being, with Westcountry and Carlton having hour-long news, while most of the other areas wished to have more local programmes in the early evenings which resulted in some areas, moving the series back before CITV.

- Anglia and Central: Mondays to Wednesdays at 5:10pm, then switching to Wednesdays to Fridays at 5:10pm. Completed on 19 May 1993, although repeats were transmitted until Christmas.
- Carlton: Mondays to Fridays at 3:20pm. Completed on 4 June 1993.
- HTV: Mondays to Thursdays at 1:45pm. Completed on 2 August 1993.
- Scottish: Continued to air the series between two and four times most week until 1 September 1993. Reappeared daily at 5:25am over Christmas period from 18 December 1993 finally completing the series on 7 January 1994.
- Westcountry: Mondays to Fridays at 1:45pm. Completed on 3 September 1993.
- Border, Tyne Tees and Yorkshire: Continued on Tuesdays to Thursdays at 6:30pm. Completed on 28 September 1993.
- Grampian: Mondays to Fridays at 1:45pm. Completed on 21 December 1993.
- Meridian: Tuesdays and Wednesdays at 6:30 pm. Completed on 14 December 1993.
- Granada: Aired 2–3 episodes most weeks at 5:10pm. From April to August, it was moved to 3:20 pm. Completed in January 1994.
- Ulster: Mondays to Fridays at 3:20 pm until August 1993, then switching to Saturday lunchtime until completed 15 January 1994.

===== 1994–95 =====
After the tenth series, Blockbusters was no longer networked on ITV. But it continued for one more series on the satellite channel Sky One. Six ITV regional channels showed this series.

- Sky One: Mondays to Fridays at 7:00pm from 18 April to 30 September 1994 before moving to 6:30pm from 28 November 1994 to 17 February 1995.
- Anglia and Central: Mondays to Wednesdays at 2:50pm from 18 April 1994 to 12 July 1995.
- Meridian: Wednesdays from early June until early September 1994
- Tyne Tees and Yorkshire: Around 70 episodes; Tuesdays to Thursdays at 6:30 pm from 11 July to 29 December 1995.
- Border: Around 50 episodes aired up to twice a week at 5:10 pm.

== Reruns ==
Challenge TV aired Blockbusters starting from September 1996 during the final months of The Family Channel and was the first game show broadcast on the relaunch from the Family Channel to Challenge TV on 3 February 1997 showing reruns from Series 9, it was repeated in February to June 1997, January to May 1998, September 1998 to January 1999 and May to September 1999.

In 2004, Saturday Night Takeaway showed clips from a 1992 episode with a contestant in the audience who did not get very far on the show and only won £10. Following requests on the (now "defunct") Challenge forums to air the show, Challenge managed to acquire Blockbusters from June 2004 to June 2006, but they only showed the first 25 episodes from Series 10, which generated low ratings. Carlton Select also showed old shows while that channel was still operational.

Challenge reacquired Blockbusters but this time, they acquired 72 episodes from Series 10, and broadcast them during 2011. On 8 May 2014, they acquired the first series, which aired from 26 May. On 4 January 2016, Challenge began showing Series 11 (the first Sky One series), acquiring 179 of the 180 episodes in the series. In April 2024, Challenge began to rebroadcast Series 2 for the first time since its original broadcast in 40 years.

== Notable contestants ==
- Mel Giedroyc
- Tim Harford (1991)
- Jesse Honey (1990s)
- James Humphreys (1984, 1987)
- Konnie Huq (1992, 2012)
- Daniel Kitson
- Naomi Long (1989)
- Kerry McCarthy
- Stephen Merchant (1997)
- Ian Payne (1990s)
- Richard Lloyd Parry (1986)
- Jon Tickle (1991)

== Other countries ==
The format has been remade in a number of countries during the 1980s and 1990s:

- Australia – The Australian version of Blockbusters, hosted by Michael Pope, was broadcast on the Seven Network from 1991 to 1993. It had schools competing against other schools. Additionally, it also had an intro that looks similar to the Holness era from the UK version, although the theme song was different.
- Germany – A German version called Supergrips (originally called Grips before it) aired from 1988 to 1995 on the Bavarian TV network. Frank Laufenberg was the show's original host from 1988 until 1990, then was later replaced by Ingo Dubinski from 1991 until 1995.
- France – The French version was called Parcours d'enfer (Course of Hell) aired on TF1 and hosted by Pierre Bellemare.
- Indonesia – The Indonesian version called Aksara Bermakna (Meaningful Letters) aired on two networks, first on TVRI from 1989 to 1996 with Kepra as host, then on antv for a brief period from 1997 to 1999, this time with Anton Gemilar as host. It was created by Ani Sumadi.
- Israel – The Israeli version, called Nuts, ran on Israeli Educational Television from 1985 to 1994 with teenagers playing. Hosts of the Hebrew version were Shosh Atari, Avri Gilad, Ito Aviram, Anat Dolev, Mennachem Perry and Nahum Ido. An Arabic version, called Paths (masarat, مسارات), aired on the same network in 1996.
- Italy – The Italian version is called Doppio Slalom (Dual Slalom) aired on Canale 5 from 1985 to 1990, originally hosted by Corrado Tedeschi from 1985 to 1990. Followed by Paolo Bonolis in the 1990 series.
- Jordan – The Jordanian version is called Lo3bet Al-Hourof on Amman TV with Zaid Zghoul.
- Netherlands – A Dutch version of the show called Blokletters (Block Letters) ran for a brief period from 1986 on AVRO with Fred Oster at the helm. Its set with a mix of half light and dark colours and gameplay is very similar to that of the short-lived 1980–82 U.S. original.
- Paraguay – In Paraguay, called Blockbuster, like the Australian version, where two schools competed against each other. It aired on Telefuturo for a brief period in 1999, its hosts were Clari Arias and Leti Medina.
- Saudi Arabia – The Saudi Arabian version is called ABC Program/Competitions Letters, hosted by Ibrahim al-Qasim, Majid Cub, Ghanem Al Saleh, and Ghalib Full. The network for this version in particular aired on First Channel Saudi Arabia from 1987 until 1994. Then it was revived again three years later from 1997 until 1998. Twenty years later, a version hosted by Salman Al-Otaibi aired in 2017.
- Sweden – SVT in Sweden had their own version very similar to the UK one. 2 mot 1 (2 to 1) was a weekly afternoon programme forming part of SVT's youth output. The programme was produced in Malmö airing from 1998 to 1999 and was hosted by Stellan Sundahl until he died from a heart attack in 1999 at the age of 52.
- Switzerland – The Swiss version, also called Blockbusters, was hosted by Sven Epiney and aired on SF from 1997 to 2000.
- Turkey – The Turkish version called Haydi Bastir (Let's Print) aired on Show TV from 1992 to 1993, the host was Mim Kemal Öke. Additionally, its set (and intro) looks similar to the original Holness era.
- United Arab Emirates – Blockbusters (the UK edition) was such a sensation with the entire English-speaking expatriate community in Dubai, U.A.E, that the city nearly came to a shutdown during its evening broadcast on Channel 33. Although there was no separate local TV version, the local paper, Gulf News, ran a yearly Blockbusters quiz competition, often hosted by Holness himself, between 1988 and 1994. The Gulf News Blockbusters show was telecast on Dubai TV too and was broadcast as a month-long event, with the heats during Ramadan and the finals after Eid al-Fitr.

After a 14-year-long hiatus, the contest was revived in 2008 as part of the newspaper's 30th-anniversary celebrations. It was also held in 2009 where the team "Anonymoys +3" whose members included Rahul Menon and Aayush Rajasekaran of The Indian High School stood first place. This marked the second year that a team from the Indian High School defeated one from long-time rivals The Modern High School to claim first place.

- United States – The original American version of Blockbusters aired twice on NBC. Originally from 1980 until 1982, hosted by Bill Cullen with the "2 in 1" format. This was followed by a brief return of the show in 1987 hosted by Bill Rafferty which dropped the "2 in 1" format and had single contestants instead.

Other foreign versions of Blockbusters have aired in Portugal and Singapore.
