= 1994 in Australia =

- Monarch: Elizabeth II
- Governor-General: Bill Hayden
- Prime minister: Paul Keating
- Population: 17,854,738
- Elections: NT

The following lists events that happened during 1994 in Australia.

- Decades: 1970s; 1980s; 1990s; 2000s; 2010s
- See also: 1994 in Australian television; 1994 in Australian literature; Other events of 1994; Timeline of Australian history

== Incumbents ==
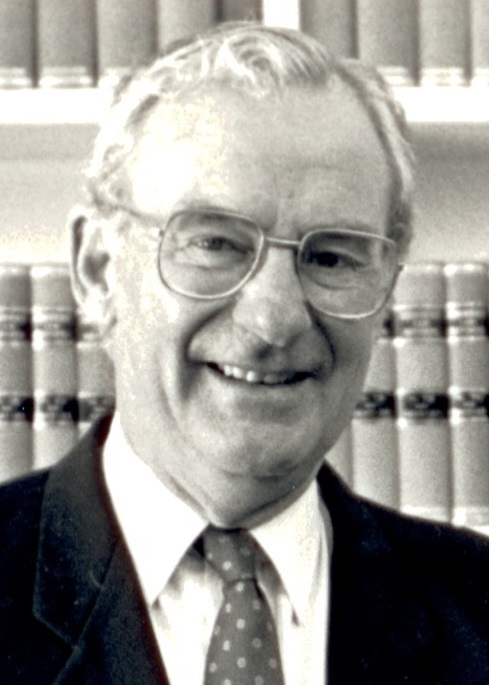
Bill Hayden

Paul Keating

- Monarch – Elizabeth II
- Governor-General – Bill Hayden
- Prime Minister – Paul Keating
  - Deputy Prime Minister – Brian Howe
  - Opposition Leader – John Hewson (until 23 May), then Alexander Downer
- Chief Justice – Sir Anthony Mason

=== State and territory leaders ===
- Premier of New South Wales – John Fahey
  - Opposition Leader – Bob Carr
- Premier of Queensland – Wayne Goss
  - Opposition Leader – Rob Borbidge
- Premier of South Australia – Dean Brown
  - Opposition Leader – Lynn Arnold (until 5 November), then Mike Rann
- Premier of Tasmania – Ray Groom
  - Opposition Leader – Michael Field
- Premier of Victoria – Jeff Kennett
  - Opposition Leader – John Brumby
- Premier of Western Australia – Richard Court
  - Opposition Leader – Carmen Lawrence (until 7 February), then Ian Taylor (until 12 October), then Jim McGinty
- Chief Minister of the Australian Capital Territory – Rosemary Follett
  - Opposition Leader – Kate Carnell
- Chief Minister of the Northern Territory – Marshall Perron
  - Opposition Leader – Brian Ede
- Head of Government of Norfolk Island – John Brown (until 4 May), then Michael King

=== Governors and administrators ===
- Governor of New South Wales – Peter Sinclair
- Governor of Queensland – Leneen Forde
- Governor of South Australia – Dame Roma Mitchell
- Governor of Tasmania – Sir Phillip Bennett
- Governor of Victoria – Richard McGarvie
- Governor of Western Australia – Michael Jeffery
- Administrator of the Australian Indian Ocean Territories – Danny Gillespie (from 1 July)
- Administrator of Norfolk Island – Alan Kerr
- Administrator of the Northern Territory – Austin Asche

== Events ==
=== January ===
- 1 January –
  - The Duchess of York's sister, Jane Makim, marries for a second time in a cliff-top ceremony in Sydney. The ceremony, conducted by a female celebrant, took place at the exclusive Jonah's Restaurant.
  - Queensland Minerals and Energy Minister, Tom McGrady, announces that an inquiry will be held into an accident at a central Queensland open cut coal mine in which two men were killed and another two seriously injured.
- 2 to 15 January – Major bushfires devastate coastal New South Wales—four people are killed and over 300 homes are lost.
- 22 January – Industry, Technology and Regional Development Minister Alan Griffiths resigns over the "sandwich shop" affair, causing a Cabinet reshuffle.
- 26 January – Student and activist David Kang fires two blank shots from a starting pistol at the Prince of Wales (now Charles III) in Sydney, Australia before being tackled by authorities. Kang was sentenced to 500 hours of community service as punishment.

=== February ===
- 1 February – Australian businessman Christopher Skase is arrested in Spain.
- 3 February – Prime Minister Paul Keating threatens to change the rules on election of Senators, as what he regarded as "the unrepresentative swill" continues to thwart and embarrass his Government.
- 4 February – Labor MP John Dawkins resigns.
- 8 February – Prime Minister Paul Keating introduces changes to Question Time, with a roster of ministers and at least 14 questions to be asked each sitting day. Response was mixed.
- 11 February – Neal Blewitt resigns to become High Commissioner in London.
- 14 February – During a Four Corners programme on the ABC, Liberals speak of a possible leadership change.
- 16 February – It is announced that former Prime Minister Bob Hawke and Former Treasurer John Kerin are to be summonsed before a Senate Inquiry into foreign media ownership of the Fairfax Group.
- 27 February – Sport and Environment Minister Ros Kelly resigns over the "sports rorts affair", which involved her department's law methods and alleged political bias in administering some $30 million in grants to sporting bodies.

=== March ===
- 2 March – A bomb explodes in the Adelaide headquarters of the National Crime Authority killing one man, Detective-Sergeant Geoff Bowen, and severely wounding another. The man responsible, Dominic Perre, went in and out of jail. He died in 2024.
- 4 March – Australian authorities request the extradition from Spain of Christopher Skase, who has been held in a hospital on the Spanish island of Mallorca since January.
- 12 March – The 1994 Fremantle by-election is won by former West Australian Premier Carmen Lawrence, an electorate which had been vacated by John Dawkins.
- 15 March – Sallyanne Atkinson, former Brisbane Lord Mayor, is appointed Federal Trade Commissioner in Paris.
- 18 March – It is announced that David Barbagallo and Dennis Atkins, advisors to Queensland Premier Wayne Goss, will face a Criminal Justice Commission Inquiry into their alleged misconduct.
- 19 March –
  - The 1994 Bonython by-election in South Australia is won by former Independent Labor MP for Elizabeth, Martyn Evans.
  - On a charter flight from Cairns, a Piper Aztec crashes in the Belleden Ker Range, Queensland, killing all four on board.
- 21 March – A Britten Norman Islander crashes on take-off from Weipa, Queensland, killing the pilot and five passengers.
- 24 March – Federal Health Minister Graham Richardson resigns and he is replaced by Carmen Lawrence. John Faulkner enters Cabinet with the Environment portfolio.
- 26 March –
  - Jim Soorley wins a second term as Lord Mayor in the Brisbane City Council elections.
  - The 1994 Mackellar by-election is won by Bronwyn Bishop whose leadership ambitions stalled when she suffered a 5% swing.
  - The 1994 Warringah by-election is won by Tony Abbott – the electorate vacated by Michael MacKellar.

=== May ===
- 4 May – Prime Minister Paul Keating's landmark White Paper on employment, Working Nation, is released, proposing measures to boost economic growth and assist the disadvantaged long-term unemployed.
- 10 May – Federal Treasurer Ralph Willis delivers his Budget speech early to facilitate necessary consultation and discussions with minor parties in the Senate. The promised $6.5 billion social justice package includes a $1.46 billion land fund to finance native title claims.
- 5 May - Adelaide man Tony Grosser shoots at police when they come to arrest him. During the stand off, hundreds of shots are fired and Derrick McManus a SA police officer is shot many times.
- 20 May – Under increasing pressure, Federal Opposition Leader John Hewson calls a sudden leadership spill. having sacked Peter Reith from the shadow ministry for endorsing Fightback!, the policy which he as leader had declared "dead and buried" at a Liberal policy retreat only 4 weeks earlier.
- 23 May – John Hewson is replaced as Leader of the Opposition by Alexander Downer 43:36. Wooldridge gives way to Peter Costello as deputy.

=== June ===
- 4 June– The Country Liberal Party led by Marshall Perron holds government when it wins the Northern Territory election.
- 15 June – Federal Opposition Leader Alexander Downer declares that "a vote for me is a vote for the Australian flag, a vote for Mr. Keating is a vote to rip it up".

=== July ===
- 5 July – Federal Opposition Leader Alexander Downer asserts that changes to the Constitution are "not worth the bother or effort".
- 11 July – During a tour of the Northern Territory, Alexander Downer displays lack of knowledge on the Territory's Land Rights Act and its implications for Coalition policies on native title.
- 15 July – Former Western Australian Premier Brian Burke is sentenced to eight months' jail.
- 19 July – In Spain, Christopher Skase begins his fight against extradition in a Mallorca court.
- 25 July – Telephone numbers in Australia begin transitioning to eight digits. Mona Vale in Sydney is the first suburb to change to the new numbers.
- 31 July – Federal Opposition Leader Alexander Downer states that the Mabo legislation would be repealed "if necessary".
- August – Wollemia nobilis, a "fossil tree", is discovered by bushwalker David Noble only 150 km from Sydney.

=== August ===
- 7 August – Victoria Police officers raid Tasty, a predominantly gay nightclub in Melbourne. Club patrons are detained and strip-searched for several hours, resulting in a landmark class action legal case.
- 26 August – Federal Opposition Leader Alexander Downer dismisses John Hewson from the shadow cabinet because of his continuing calls for moderation on homosexual issues.
- 28 August – Australia finishes the Commonwealth Games in Victoria, Canada with a record 87 gold medals.

=== September ===
- 5 September –
  - New South Wales state MP John Newman is shot outside his home, in Australia's first political assassination since 1977.
  - Federal Opposition Leader Alexander Downer releases a policy blueprint for the Liberal Party entitled The Things That Matter. On 8 September, his puns on the title delivered during a speech at the New South Wales party's annual dinner further erode his public standing.
- 15 September – Andrew Peacock resigns from the blue-ribbon seat of Kooyong.
- 23 September – The shadow cabinet agrees not to oppose Labor's Human Rights (Sexual Conduct) Bill to override Tasmania's anti-gay laws, sparking revolt in conservative ranks. During the Bill's passage, the Coalition breaks ranks.
- 25 – 28 September – The Australian Labor Party's biennial conference in Hobart reveals the dominance of Paul Keating and the party's parliamentary wing. A decision over the 3 mines uranium policy is shelved, but the pre-selection of women in 35% of winnable seats by the year 2002 is endorsed.

=== October ===
- 2 October – A Seaview Air Aero Commander crashes into the sea on flight to Lord Howe Island with the loss of all 9 people on board.
- 9 October – Four people are killed when their Cessna 337A crashes soon after take-off from Walgett, New South Wales.
- 19 October – Liberal Tasmanian MP Chris Miles resigns due to the party's decision not to oppose Labor's Human Rights (Sexual Conduct) Bill.
- 28 – 30 October – Against strong opposition, the Liberal Federal Conference carries reforms to enhance the power of the federal Executive to intervene in state divisions to ensure fiscal probity and to select quality candidates.

=== November ===
- 4 November – Sydney Airport's third runway opens, resulting in protests about noise levels.
- 11 November – At a joint meeting of the Coalition parties, Federal Liberal Leader Alexander Downer ignores substantial opposition to Labor's Racial Hatred Bill and amendments to the Racial Discrimination Act, proposing a Liberal Bill instead. Queensland National backbencher Bob Katter declares that Mr. Downer's days as leader are numbered.
- 19 November – Liberal MP Petro Georgio wins the 1994 Kooyong by-election.

=== December ===
- 2 December – The Australian government agrees to pay reparations to aborigines who were displaced during the nuclear tests in the 1950s and 1960s.
- 9 December – Liberal Queensland MP Ron Boswell resigns due to the party's decision not to oppose Labor's Human Rights (Sexual Conduct) Bill.
- 17 December – A Spanish court overturns Christopher Skase's extradition from Spain.
- 22 December – Prime Minister Paul Keating confirms Resource Minister Beddall's decision to renew woodchip licences and increase woodchip volumes, a decision which went against Environment Minister Faulkner's advice and enraged the environment movement.

== Arts and literature ==
- Rodney Hall's novel The Grisly Wife wins the Miles Franklin Award

== Film ==
- Muriel's Wedding
- The Adventures of Priscilla, Queen of the Desert
- Sirens
- The Sum of Us

== Television ==
- 18 January – Blue Heelers premieres on Channel 7.
- 28 April – The Tasmanian television market is aggregated, with TasTV (now WIN Television) taking a Nine Network affiliation and Southern Cross taking a dual Seven and Ten affiliation.
- 21 July – Mother and Son finale airs. (1984–1994)
- Hey Dad...! hosts its final original episode (1984–1994)
- A Country Practice (1981–1993 on Channel 7) revival attempt on Channel 10 backfires.

== Sport ==
- 9 February – Twenty minute quarters and the "final 8" are introduced in the AFL.
- February – Australia takes its first Winter Olympic medal when the Australian short track speed skating team wins bronze in the 5000m relay at the 1994 Winter Olympics in Lillehammer, Norway.
- 2 March – Rumours of a breakaway competition reported after relations deteriorate between the Brisbane Broncos & the NSWRL
- 10 March – First day of the Australian Track & Field Championships for the 1993–1994 season, which are held at the ES Marks Athletics Field in Sydney. The combined events championships were conducted in Canberra on 17 and 18 March 1994.
- 1 May – Adelaide City become NSL Champions for the third time, defeating a Mark Viduka inspired Melbourne Knights at Olympic Park.
- 23 May – Queensland stage heart-stopping fightback in the last five minutes of the 1994 State of Origin series' 1st game. After coming from 12–4 down, winger Mark Coyne scores match-winner in final minute.
- 8 June – 87,161 people-an Australian rugby league record-turn out at the Melbourne Cricket Ground for State of Origin II. NSW win 14–0.
- 17 July – Michael Dalton wins the men's national marathon title, clocking 2:16:17 in Brisbane, while Joanne Cowan claims the women's title in 2:45:35.
- 26 July – NSWRL general manager John Ribot concedes a privately run competition is feasible as news of a "Super League" competition surfaces.
- 25 September – Canberra Raiders captain & rugby league legend Mal Meninga ends club career on winning note when he leads Canberra to a comprehensive 36–12 defeat of minor premiers Canterbury Bulldogs in the NSWRL Grand Final. His playing career would finish two months later when he led the Kanagroos on a successful tour of Great Britain & France. Balmain Tigers finish in last position, claiming the wooden spoon.
- 1 October – West Coast Eagles (20.20.143) defeated Geelong (8.15.63) to win the 98th AFL premiership.
- 20 October – ARL chairman Ken Arthurson warns the Broncos that they face expulsion over their involvement with Super League.
- 13 November – Michael Schumacher wins the 1994 Formula One Drivers' Championship despite retiring from the Australian Grand Prix at the Adelaide Street Circuit. Williams Renault win the 1994 Constructors Championship.

== Births ==
- 1 January – Brendan Elliot, rugby league player
- 14 January
  - Brad Crouch, footballer
  - Kane Elgey, rugby league player
- 21 January
  - Laura Robson, tennis player
  - Marny Kennedy, actress
- 22 February – Rachael Leahcar, singer-songwriter
- 8 March – Dylan Tombides, Australian soccer player (d. 2014)
- 6 April – Jasmine Curtis-Smith, Filipina-Australian actress and sister of Anne Curtis
- 7 April – Viktorija Rajicic, tennis player
- 9 April - Brad Smith, soccer player
- 15 April – Mitchell Barnett, rugby league player
- 11 May – Nene Macdonald, rugby league player
- 15 June – Alice Englert, actress
- 17 June – Jiordan Anna Tolli, actor
- 24 June – Tory Green, actor
- 27 June – Mitchell Hope, actor
- 6 July – Scott James, Olympic snowboarder
- 8 July – Christopher Smith, youtuber better known as HowToBasic
- 3 August – Cameron Waters, motor racing driver
- 4 August – Pauli Pauli, rugby league player
- 25 August – Natasha Liu Bordizzo, actor
- 28 August – Bobby Andonov, singer
- 6 September – Joel Lok, actor
- 16 September – Maddison Gabriel, model
- 23 September – John Folau, Australian-Tongan rugby league player
- 18 October – Morgan Featherstone, fashion model
- 20 October – Corey Oates, rugby league player
- 31 October – Connor Chapman, soccer player
- 6 November – Isaah Yeo, rugby league player
- 22 November – Dacre Montgomery, actor
- 28 November – Bonnie Anderson, Australian singer
- 21 December – Luke Brooks, rugby league player

== Deaths ==
- 16 January – Jack Metcalfe, track and field athlete (b. 1912)
- 28 January – Frank Hardy, novelist (b. 1917)
- 13 April – John Marriott, Tasmanian politician (b. 1913)
- 14 May – Leonard Teale, actor (b. 1922)
- 28 May – Sir Charles Spry, 2nd Director-General of Security of ASIO (b. 1910)
- 2 July – Pat Hand, Australian rules footballer (b. 1923)
- 11 July – Jack Dennington, Australian rules footballer (b. 1907)
- 16 August – Stan Devenish Meares, obstetrician and gynaecologist (b. 1906)
- 27 September – Sir Nigel Bowen, New South Wales politician and Federal Court Chief Justice (born in Canada) (b. 1911)
- 18 October – Timothy Conigrave, actor, activist, and author (b. 1959)

== See also ==
- 1994 in Australian television
- List of Australian films of 1994
