= Connections (game show) =

British television game show (1985–1990)

- Genre: Game show
- Presented by: Daytime; Sue Robbie (1985–88); Simon Potter (1989–90); Primetime; Richard Madeley
- Voices of: Charles Foster
- Country of origin: United Kingdom
- Original language: English
- No. of series: 6 (daytime); 2 (primetime)
- No. of episodes: 272 (daytime); 26 (primetime)

Production
- Running time: 30 minutes (inc. adverts)
- Production company: Granada

Original release
- Network: ITV
- Release: 26 April 1985 – 6 July 1990

Connections is a British game show, devised and produced by John Huntley, that aired on ITV from 26 April 1985 to 6 July 1990. The daytime version is hosted by Sue Robbie from 1985 to 1988 and Simon Potter from 1989 to 1990, while the primetime version is hosted by Richard Madeley.

The main theme music and 'stings' throughout the show were composed by Bill Connor and had a catchy '80's feel to it. The same theme was used in the daytime version hosted by Sue Robbie and primetime version with Richard Madeley.

== Background ==
The daytime version had teenagers as contestants, in a similar vein to another ITV quiz, Blockbusters, with which the show was alternated. The primetime version had adults as contestants as part of ITV's new primetime schedule in 1988.

== Gameplay ==
The game involved two contestants (three in the final series in 1990) trying to make connections by virtue of clues given by the host.

=== Connect the Clues ===
In rounds one and three, contestants were asked general knowledge questions, which they could answer by buzzing in. Each correct answer earned the contestant 10 points and revealed a picture clue on a 3×3 gameboard (which in later series became a board of 10 screens). The contestant who gave a correct answer would then have an opportunity to guess the connection between the pictures. When the connection has been identified, the contestant who identified it wins bonus points (starting at 100 after the first two clues and decreasing by 10 for each additional clue) and the round ends. During the Sue Robbie era, round three would be played the same way for twice the points.

=== Find the Figure ===
In round two, general knowledge questions were once again asked on the buzzer. But this time, a correct answer not only scored 10 points but also reveals either a number or a mathematical symbol; once eight questions have been answered a sum goes in a clockwise direction around the board, ending with an equals (=) sign. The contestants are then asked (again on the buzzer) for the answer to the sum, which is then revealed in the centre square. The correct sum scored 40 points.

=== Bonus games ===
Typically, three rounds were played between the two contestants – Connect the Clues, Find the Figure and then a second Connect the Clues round (in which points were worth double). After these rounds have been played, the winner would play a solo bonus game.

==== Link the Letters ====
This was the original bonus game. The contestant is given 50 seconds to answer eight questions. Each correct answer would reveal a letter (the first letter of the answer) behind one of the screens. After the eight questions, the winning player has the remaining time to identify the 8-letter word, arranged clockwise starting from a random position, in order to win the round. If not all questions were answered correctly, some letters would be missing, thereby making it harder to the contestant to identify the word. This changed in a later version of the show by having the eight letters arranged in circular form, but still without revealing where it actually started. Solving the 8-letter word won a grand prize. A contestant was allowed to compete in up to four "Link The Letters" rounds before they 'retired' undefeated, although very few contestants ever achieved this feat.

Note: When Richard Madeley and Simon Potter took over, this bonus became the final round of the main game.

==== The Final Connection ====
In later series, "Link the Letters" was dumped in favour of "The Final Connection" game. Now the winning player was given the first and last pictures on the board. The object was to connect the first picture to the last (with the help of three clues on each) for £1,000 (later decreased to £400).

== Consolation prizes ==
During the Sue Robbie era, each departing contestant received a camera, and a charity of their choice received £1 per point scored in all of their games. When Richard Madeley took over as host, the consolation prize was changed to a goody bag; under Simon Potter, it was a pocket TV.

== Transmissions ==
=== Daytime ===
Series	Start date	End date	Episodes	Host
1	26 April 1985	13 July 1985	50	Sue Robbie
2	3 March 1986	29 April 1986	50	Sue Robbie
3	24 January 1987	25 March 1987	50	Sue Robbie
4	8 February 1988	9 April 1988	50	Sue Robbie
5	10 July 1989	1 September 1989	40	Simon Potter
6	15 May 1990	6 July 1990	32	Simon Potter

=== Primetime ===
Series	Start date	End date	Episodes	Host
1	12 April 1988	12 July 1988	13	Richard Madeley
2	14 March 1989	6 June 1989	13	Richard Madeley

=== Regional transmissions information ===
Connections followed the Blockbusters pattern in being a 'straddling' format, which allowed for games to last a different length of time, meaning that episodes would often begin and end mid-game, and matches often crossed over into two episodes. The show was generally screened on Mondays to Fridays at 5:15pm, filling the half-hour timeslot between Children's ITV and the ITN News at 5:45, with a similar timeslot allocated on Saturdays for a while. The series was never fully networked across ITV's fourteen regions, this meant that it was occasionally possible to re-tune the television to a neighbouring region and watch a different episode. Connections did share its time slot with other game shows such as Ask No Questions, Blockbusters, and Winner Takes All.

==== Daytime ====
===== 1985 =====
- Thames/LWT Started on 26 April and finished on 13 July. Tuesday to Fridays at 5.15pm and Saturdays at 5:05pm (or after the early evening news.)
- Anglia, Grampian, Scottish and TVS: Started on 26 April and finished on 24 July. Wednesdays to Saturdays at 5:15pm.
- TVS: Started on 26 April and finished on 9 August 1985. Thursday to Saturdays at 5:15pm.
- Border, Central, Granada, HTV, Tyne Tees, UTV and Yorkshire: Started on 13 May and finished on 19 July. Mondays to Fridays at 5:15pm.
- TSW: Started on 8 July and finished 30 August but didn't complete the run. Mondays, Fridays and Saturdays at ?:??pm.

===== 1986 =====
- Border, Central, HTV, Tyne Tees, UTV and Yorkshire: Started on 3 March and finished on 29 April. Mondays to Fridays at 5:15pm.
- Thames/LWT: Started on 3 March and finished on 3 May. Mondays to Wednesdays and Fridays to Saturdays at 5:15pm.
- Granada: Started on 4 March and finished on 30 April. Tuesdays to Saturdays at 5:15pm.
- Anglia, Grampian, Scottish and TVS: Started on 3 May and finished on 6 August. Wednesdays to Saturdays at 5:15pm.
- TSW: From 1 July at 11:00am, every Tuesday and Thursday. From Mid September it had switched to the 5:15pm slot until Friday 10 October.

===== 1987 =====
- Border, Central, Granada, HTV, Thames/LWT, Tyne Tees, UTV and Yorkshire: Started on 24 January and finished on 25 March. Mondays to Saturdays at 5:15pm.
- Anglia, Grampian, Scottish and TVS: Started on 17 April and finished on 14 August. Wednesdays to Fridays at 5:15pm.
- TSW: Did not air the series.

===== 1988 =====
- Border, Central, Granada, HTV, Thames/LWT, TVS, Tyne Tees, UTV and Yorkshire: Started on 8 February and finished on 9 April. Mondays to Saturdays at 5:15pm.
- Anglia: Started on 17 March, then dropped four weeks later for Winner Takes All. The remaining 25 episodes were not aired.
- TSW: Started on 18 July and finished on 16 September. Mondays to Fridays at 5:15pm.
- Grampian and Scottish: Did not air the series.

===== 1989 =====
- All regions: Started on 10 July and finished on 1 September. Mondays to Fridays at 3:00pm.

===== 1990 =====
- All regions: Started on 15 May and finished on 6 July. Tuesdays to Fridays at 3:00pm.

==== Primetime ====
===== 1988 =====
- Anglia, Border, Central, Granada, HTV, Thames/LWT, TSW, TVS, Tyne Tees, UTV and Yorkshire: Started on 12 April and finished on 12 July. Tuesdays at 6:30pm.
- Scottish: Started on 18 April and finished on 19 July. Mondays at 6:30pm.
- Grampian: Started on 16 April On Saturdays at 5.15pm until 21 May before switching to Thursday at 3:00pm. on 26 May and finishing on 4 August.

===== 1989 =====
- All regions: Started on 14 March and finished on 6 June. Tuesdays at 6:30pm.
