= Total Recall (game show) =

- Presented by: Michael Pope
- Narrated by: Mark Malone
- Country of origin: Australia
- Original language: English
- No. of seasons: 2
- No. of episodes: 130

Production
- Production locations: Brisbane, Queensland
- Running time: 21 minutes

Original release
- Network: Seven Network
- Release: 15 August 1994 – 22 November 1995

Total Recall is an Australian children's game show that aired on the Seven Network. It was hosted by Michael Pope who also hosted the Australian version of the popular game show Blockbusters. The series was first originally broadcast in 1994 and ended in 1995. It was also repeated on pay TV channel Nickelodeon a few years later.

The show saw two competing schools play a memory game. On Monday to Thursday, four kids from one of the schools would play and the person with the most points at the end of the day was declared winner. They were then asked to come back on Friday where the four winners that week would go school against school. Also trying to amass the most points during the week to win the schools prize at the end of the week

== Round one ==
A list of things was presented to the contestants in a particular order and then they had to recall which order they went in with Michael Pope providing clues to the answers.

== Round two ==
Contestants are presented with a sillouette of an object for 15 seconds, which is the jumbled around, then are tasked with naming the object and then unscrambling the picture.

== Trivia ==
- This show was the first spin off kids game show for A*mazing.
- The show was rerun in 1997–1999 on Nickelodeon.
