= Child model =

Child who is employed as a model

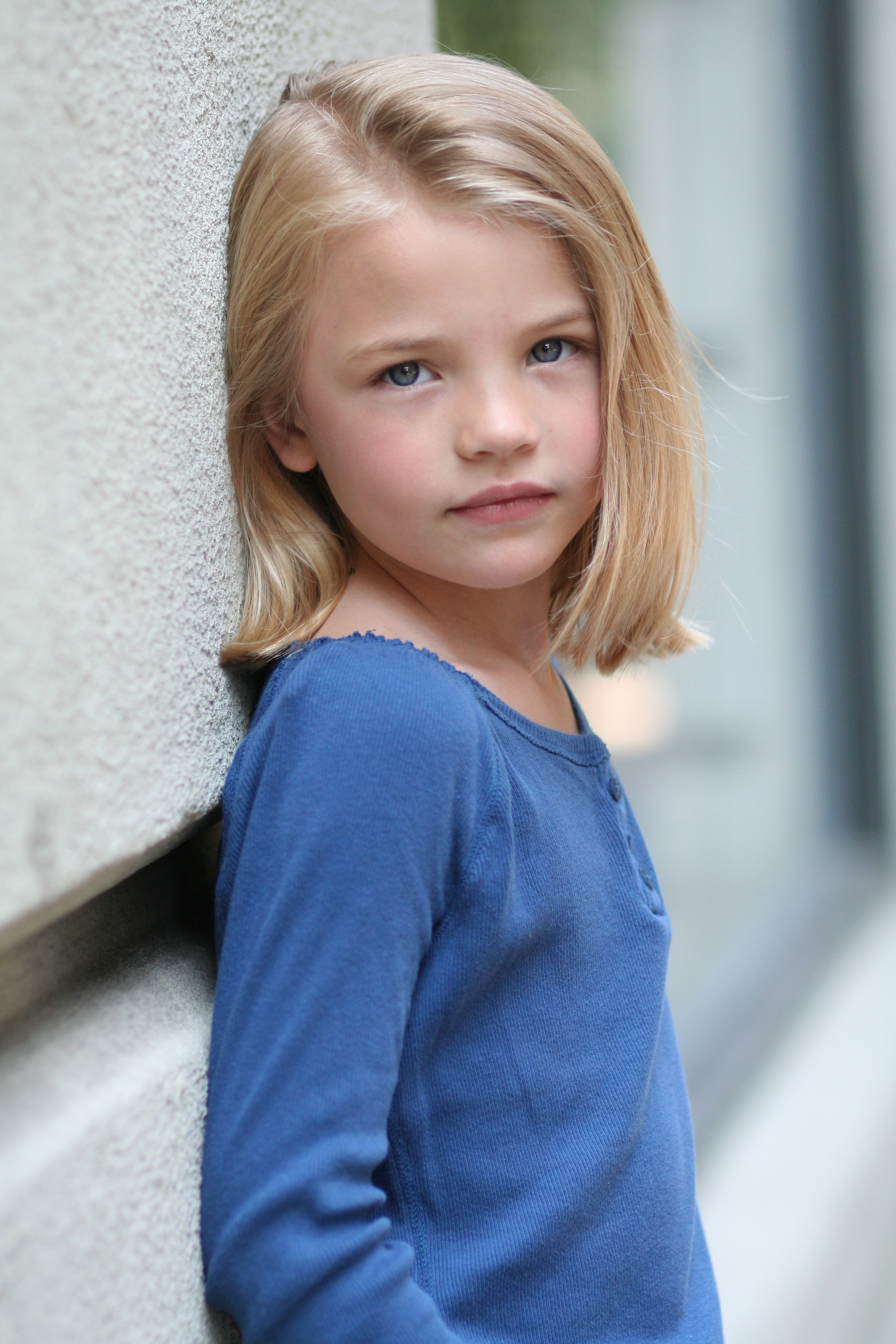
Child models are used for a wide variety of commercial purposes, often because they evoke a sense of innocence or vulnerability.

A child model is a child who is employed to display, advertise and promote commercial products or to serve as a subject of works of art, such as photography, painting and sculpture.

== Practice ==
Artists have used children as models for countless works over the centuries. Child modeling has become a distinct activity because of the explosion of commercial media over the past several decades. Many young actresses and actors, notably, Naomi Campbell, Jennifer Connelly, Katherine Heigl, Jessica Alba, Ashley Benson, Lindsay Lohan, Naya Rivera, Zendaya, Bella Thorne, Raven-Symoné, Miranda Cosgrove, Hayley Kiyoko, Liv Tyler, Brooke Shields, Taylor Momsen, Peyton List, Gigi Hadid, Yara Shahidi, Maddie Ziegler, Skai Jackson, Anastasia Bezrukova, Isabella Cramp and Frankie Muniz began as child models. The book, Lisanne: A Young Model, described the life of Lisanne Falk, a colleague of Brooke Shields at the Ford modeling agency in the late 1970s. Falk, like Shields, was a relatively successful child model who posed for magazine covers, notably Seventeen, for editorial fashion layouts, and for advertising in magazines and mail-order catalogs. Both models appeared in the 1977 Sears and Montgomery Ward catalogs. Falk, like Shields, moved from modeling to movies as she became older. More recently Australian child model Morgan Featherstone has achieved worldwide success but has also attracted criticism due to her looking older than her age.

The visible success of child models who became media celebrities has led numerous children (and their parents) to pursue modeling as a part-time career. In practice, most modeling jobs go to children who have already worked as models and have developed a working relationship with a modeling agency. For prospective models, the challenge is to land the first job. This usually happens through referrals by people already involved in modeling. It is also possible to land jobs by contacting modeling agencies directly. Occasionally, a child may be "discovered" in a public place or through other grassroots means such as:

- Competing in local and national beauty pageants
- Working with local retailers for small-scale modeling
- Entering mall fashion shows
- Entering photo competitions.

== Salary ==
The amount that a child can earn is based upon the type of work they are contracted to carry out.

In the United States, a photo shoot for a magazine article will generally pay around $70 per hour. Advertisement work, on the other hand, can pay out between $1,000 and $1,200 for a day's work. The child's agency will take a commission from the earnings, which will be around 20%.

== See also ==
- Child beauty pageant
- Junior idol
