= List of Australian films of 1994 =

List of Australian films of 1994 contains a detailed list of films created in Australia in 1994.

== 1994 ==
Title	Director	Cast	Genre	Notes
The Adventures of Priscilla: Queen of the Desert	Stephan Elliott	Terence Stamp, Hugo Weaving, Guy Pearce	Comedy / Music	Screened at the 1994 Cannes Film Festival, won Academy Award for Best Costume Design
Aeroplane Dance	Trevor Graham	Russell Fletcher, Sean Ladhams, Tamblyn Lord	Short / Drama	
Bernie's Magic Moment	Mark Hanlin	Chris Haywood	Short	
Bête noire	Victoria Hunt		Short	
Book of Dreams: 'Welcome to Crateland'	Alex Proyas	Tiffany Powles, Steve Ostrow, Angela Cockburn	Short	
The Coffee Connection	Bill Mousoulis	Aris Gounaris, John Papp	Short	
Country Life	Michael Blakemore	Sam Neill, Greta Scacchi, John Hargreaves	Drama	Entered into the 19th Moscow International Film Festival
The Crossing	Christine Olsen		Short	
Dallas Doll	Ann Turner	Sandra Bernhard, Victoria Longley, Frank Gallacher	Comedy	
Dot in Space	Yoram Gross	Robyn Moore, Keith Scott	Animation / Family	
Ebbtide	Craig Lahiff	Harry Hamlin, Judy McIntosh, John Waters	Crime / Drama	
El Angelito	Guillermo Martín Sepúlveda	Gonzalo Vargas, Angus McGruther, Zoila Vásquez	Short	
EnvironMental	Clayton Jacobson		Short	
Eternity	Lawrence Johnston	Les Foxcroft, Noel Jordan	Documentary	
Everynight ... Everynight	Alkinos Tsilimidos	David Field, Bill Hunter	Drama	
Exile	Paul Cox	Aden Young, Beth Champion, Claudia Karvan	Drama	Entered into the 44th Berlin International Film Festival
Fuckwit	Daniel Krige	Daniel Krige, Zoe Carides, Ken Bromilow	Short	
Girl	Peter Thompson	Bruce Alexander, Maurie Annese, Anna Bertolli	Drama	
Gorgeous	Kaz Cooke	Judith Lucy, Kris McQuade, Mick Molloy	Animation Short	
Gran's Adventure	Jo Bell		Short	
Harry: The Story of an Urban Hermit	Philip Lepherd	Keir Nuttall, Ramsey Everingham, Vincent Atkinson	Short	
The Intruder	Richard Wolstencroft	Tottie Goldsmith, Lachy Hulme, Paul Moder	Thriller	
Kevin Rampenbacker and the Electric Kettle	Murray Reece	Grant Dodwell, Rima Te Wiata, Mark Wright	Comedy	aka: "Cops and Robbers"
Kid in a Bin	Robert Carter	Mark Koller, Michael Butcher, Danielle Carter	Short	
Ladykiller	Bill Mousoulis	Rhys Muldoon, Catherine Hill, Angela Twigg	Crime / Drama	
A Lamb of Our Own Flock	Mark Bellamy	Fiona Corke, John Flaus, Zach Meyers	Short	
Lex and Rory	Dean Murphy	Angus Benfeld, Stewart Faichney	Comedy	Claimed to be the first feature film edited entirely digitally
Lightning Jack	Simon Wincer	Paul Hogan, Cuba Gooding Jr., Beverly D'Angelo	Comedy	
Lucky Break	Ben Lewin	Gia Carides, Anthony LaPaglia, Rebecca Gibney	Comedy / Romance	aka: "Paperback Romance"
Mary	Kay Pavlou	Lucy Bell, Linden Wilkinson, Rebecca Scully-Webster	Docu-Drama	
Metal Skin	Geoffrey Wright	Aden Young, Tara Morice, Nadine Garner	Action / Drama	
Michelle's Third Novel	Karryn de Cinque	Marguerite Lingard	Short	
Midday Crisis	Garry Richards	Geoffrey Rush, Gus Mercurio, Ronald Jacobson	Short	
Muriel's Wedding	P.J. Hogan	Toni Collette, Rachel Griffiths, Bill Hunter	Comedy / Drama	
Only the Brave	Ana Kokkinos	Elena Mandalis, Dora Kaskanis, Maude Davey	Drama / Romance	
Our Feral Friends	Daniel Krige	Roland Gallois, Daniel Krige, Ken Bromilow	Mockumentary	
Police Rescue	Michael Carson	Gary Sweet, Zoe Carides, Steve Bastoni	Action	
Prickly Heat	Ray Boseley		Short	
Red Ted and the Great Depression	Pat Laughren		Documentary	
The Roly Poly Man	Bill Young	Paul Chubb, Susan Lyons, Les Foxcroft, Zoe Bertram	Comedy / Crime	
Rough Diamonds	Donald Crombie	Jason Donovan, Angie Milliken, Peter Phelps	Comedy / Crime	
Secrets of the City	Cathy Linsley		Short / Animation	
The Seventh Floor	Ian Barry	Brooke Shields, Masaya Katô, Craig Pearce	Action / Crime	
Signal One	Rob Stewart	Christopher Atkins, Mark 'Jacko' Jackson, Richard Carter	Action	aka: "Bullet Down Under"
Sirens	John Duigan	Hugh Grant, Tara FitzGerald, Sam Neill, Elle Macpherson	Comedy / Drama	
Spider & Rose	Bill Bennett	Ruth Cracknell, Simon Bossell, Max Cullen	Comedy	
The Sum of Us	Geoff Burton, Kevin Dowling	Jack Thompson, Russell Crowe, John Polson	Comedy / Drama	
Talk	Susan Lambert	Victoria Longley, Angie Milliken	Comedy / Drama	
That Eye, the Sky	John Ruane	Peter Coyote, Lisa Harrow, Amanda Douge	Drama / Fantasy	
This Marching Girl Thing	Kelli Simpson	Toni Collette, Matt Day, Jenny Apostolou	Short	
Total Recession	Durand Greig		Short	
Traps	Pauline Chan	Saskia Reeves, Robert Reynolds, Sami Frey	Drama	
Undying	Andrew Connell	Nick Carrafa, Fiona Corke, James Armstrong	Crime / Drama / Action	
What's Going On, Frank?	John Polson	Hugo Weaving	Short	
Writer's Block	Leon Cmielewski		Short	

== See also ==
- 1994 in Australia
- 1994 in Australian television
