= Blockbusters (American game show) =

American television game show

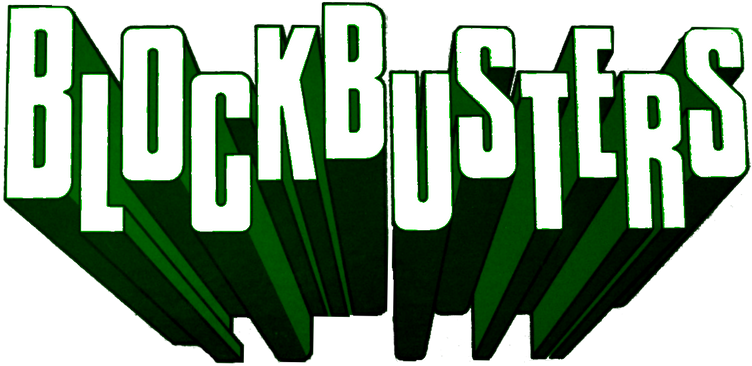
- Genre: Game show
- Created by: Steve Ryan
- Directed by: Ira Skutch (1980–1982); Marc Breslow (1987)
- Presented by: Bill Cullen; Bill Rafferty
- Announcer: Bob Hilton; Rich Jeffries
- Theme music composer: Bob Cobert (1980–1982); Music Design Group (1987)
- Country of origin: United States
- No. of seasons: 3
- No. of episodes: 372 (1980–1982); 85 (1987)

Production
- Executive producers: Ira Skutch (1980–1982); Robert Sherman (1987)
- Producers: Robert Sherman (1980–1982); Diane H. Janaver (1987)
- Production locations: NBC Studios; Burbank, California
- Running time: 22 minutes
- Production companies: Mark Goodson-Bill Todman Productions (1980–1982); Mark Goodson Television Productions (1987)

Original release
- Network: NBC
- Release: October 27, 1980 – April 23, 1982
- Release: January 5 – May 1, 1987

Related
- Blockbusters (United Kingdom)

Blockbusters is an American game show, created by Steve Ryan for Mark Goodson-Bill Todman Productions, which had two separate runs in the 1980s. Contestants answer general-knowledge questions to complete a path across or down a game board composed of hexagons. The first series of the show debuted on NBC on October 27, 1980, and aired until April 23, 1982. In the first series, a team of two family members competed against a solo contestant. Blockbusters was revived on NBC from January 5 to May 1, 1987, but featured only two solo contestants competing. Bill Cullen hosted the 1980–1982 version, with Bob Hilton as announcer and Rich Jeffries taking over in the final two weeks; Bill Rafferty hosted the 1987 version with Jeffries as announcer for the entire run. The show is the basis of the British game show of the same name, which aired in various incarnations between 1983 and 2019.

== Gameplay ==
Three contestants play in each game, with a solo contestant at a red podium, playing against a team of two contestants who are related to each other (referred to as a "family pair") and seated at a white one.

=== Main Game ===
The main game is played on a board composed of 20 hexagons, five wide and four high. The top and bottom of the board have red edges, while the sides have white edges, and contestants compete to be the first to create a complete path across the board corresponding to the respective color of their podium. Each hexagon contains a different letter of the alphabet, which represents the first letter of the one-word answer to a trivia question asked by the host. For example, a question on the letter P might be "What 'P' is a herbivorous North American mammal whose body is covered with thousands of bristles called quills?", with "porcupine" as the correct answer. All contestants may buzz in at any time, but doing so while a question is in progress forces the contestant to answer based only on whatever information has been read to that point. In addition, the family pair contestants may not confer on questions at any time.

Gameplay begins with a randomly-selected letter on the board. A correct answer turns the hexagon to the corresponding color of whomever answers correctly, while a miss gives the opposition a chance to hear the entire question again before responding. If neither side answers a question correctly, another one is asked with the same letter. The first side to make a path connecting their two edges of the board wins the round and $500. The solo player can win with as few as four correct answers, while the family pair must give at least five.

The first side to win two rounds takes or retains the championship and advances to the Gold Run bonus round; if the family pair wins, only one member may play the round.

=== Bonus Round ("Gold Rush/Gold Run") ===
The board is set up as in the main game, with each hexagon now showing up to five letters. The contestant chooses any hexagon on the leftmost side of the board, and the host reads a clue to an answer with the displayed starting letters. (E.g. for "RTRNR" and the clue "He pulled Santa's sleigh," the answer would be "Rudolph the Red-Nosed Reindeer.") A correct answer turns the hexagon gold, while a pass or miss blacks it out and removes it from play. Completing any left-to-right connection in 60 seconds awards $5,000, while failing to do so awards $100 per correct answer.

For the first four weeks of the 1980–1982 run, each individual round victory awarded no money but allowed a chance to immediately play the Gold Run (then called the Gold Rush). The prize was $2,500 during a contestant's first attempt in any given game, and $5,000 during their second.

Contestants were originally retired as undefeated champions after winning eight games and playing the last Gold Run; this limit was raised to 10 after the first four weeks, and later to 20. When the 20-win rule went into effect, several undefeated champions were invited to return to the show.

=== 1987 game changes ===
The 1987 version was no longer played two-against-one, but it was now played one-on-one with two contestants (the champion represented the color white and the challenger red). The game was still played best-two-out-of-three, and the gameboard was still laid out in the same 5x4 grid, but it was now computer-generated and displayed on a television monitor offscreen (the original series' gameboard was mechanically operated via slide projectors). Each round was now worth $100 instead of $500, and each player now had an alternating advantage in each round (the challenger in round one and the champion in round two). In case of a tiebreaker round, neither player had the advantage because the board was now reduced to an even 4x4 grid of 16 hexagons, and either player could win the game with as few as four correct answers (the challenger had to connect red-to-red vertically to win & the champion had to connect white-to-white horizontally).

The Gold Run was played the same way it was on the original series; the original grand prize was $5,000, but halfway through the series it was changed to a progressive cash jackpot that started at $5,000 and increased by that much until a returning champion won it (the jackpot was reset to $5,000 whenever a returning champion won the Gold Run or was defeated by a new opponent, whichever happened first).

Contestants were allowed to keep playing until they won ten games in a row (which only happened once) or until they were defeated, whichever happened first.

== Production ==
The 1980 music was composed by Bob Cobert. The 1987 theme music was a stock music piece called "Run, Don't Walk" from the KPM music library, composed by British composer Richard Myhill, but credited to the Music Design Group.

A re-arranged version of the 1987 theme song was used for an American adaptation of the unsold pilot Whose Baby?based on the British game show of the same name hosted by Norm Crosby in 1988.

The song from the 1987 version was used as a speed-up round cue for the black college quiz show Know Your Heritage in 1990.

== Home game ==
The Milton Bradley Company published a single home game edition in 1982. The front game play was the same as the show (with six possible board configurations to play with, although the arrangement of the hexagons was upside-down from what was used on the show). The Gold Run was also played with one of these boards, using only single-letter definitions rather than the multi-letter combinations frequently used on the television show.

== Episode status ==
Both versions of the series are intact, and have aired on Game Show Network at various times. Reruns were first aired on CBN (now Freeform) from October 8, 1984, to August 30, 1985, and was the first Goodson-Todman game show (along with Card Sharks) to be rerun on cable TV, pre-dating the launch of GSN 10 years later. GSN resumed airing the Cullen version on December 2, 2013, but it has since been dropped. The Bill Cullen version began airing on the second day of Buzzr programming on June 2, 2015.

An episode was featured in the 1998 movie Great Expectations.

== Reception ==
Cullen received an Emmy Award nomination for Best Game Show Host, his first ever, for hosting the show.

== International versions ==
Country	Local name	Host(s)	Channel	Aired
Australia	Blockbusters	Michael Pope	Seven Network	1991–1994
France	Parcours d'enfer	Pierre Bellemare	TF1	1987–1988
Germany	Supergrips (originally called Grips)	Frank Laufenberg (1988–1990); Ingo Dubinski (1991–1995)	Bavarian TV	1988–1995
Indonesia	Aksara Bermakna	Kepra; Anton Gemilar	TVRI; Antv	1992–1997; 1997–1998
Israel	(פיצוחים (שעשועון (Pitzuhim)	Shosh Atari; Avri Gilad; Ito Aviram; Anat Dolev; Mennachem Perry; Nahum Ido	Israeli Educational Television	1985–1995
Israel	مسارات (Masarat)		Israeli Educational Television	1996
Italy	Doppio Slalom	Corrado Tedeschi (1985–1990); Paolo Bonolis (1990)	Canale 5	1985–1990
Jordan	Lo3bet El-Hourouf لعبة الحروف'	Zaid Al-Ali	Amman TV	2019–present
Netherlands	Blokletters	Fred Oster	AVRO	1983–1986
Paraguay	Blockbuster	Clari Arias	Telefuturo	1997–1999
Portugal	Responder à Letra	José Jorge Duarte	SIC	1992-1993
Saudi Arabia	حروف; Huruf	Ibrahim al-Qasim; Majid Al-Shibl; Ghanem Al Saleh; Ghalib Kamil; Salman Al-Otaibi (2017)	Saudi 1	1987–1994; 1997–1998; 2017
Sweden	2 mot 1	Stellan Sundahl	SVT1	1998–1999
Switzerland	Blockbusters	Sven Epiney	SF2	1997–1999
Turkey	Haydi Bastır	Mim Kemal Öke	Show TV	1992–1993
United Arab Emirates	حروف; Huruf	Ibrahim Allan; Fawzi Al-Khamis	Abu Dhabi TV; Dubai TV	1988; 1990–1994
United Kingdom	Blockbusters	Bob Holness	ITV	1983–1993
United Kingdom	Blockbusters	Bob Holness	Sky One	1994–1995
United Kingdom	Blockbusters	Michael Aspel	BBC Two	1997
United Kingdom	Blockbusters	Liza Tarbuck	Sky One	2000–2001
United Kingdom	Blockbusters	Simon Mayo	Challenge	2012
United Kingdom	Blockbusters	Dara Ó Briain	Comedy Central	2019

== See also ==
- Hex (board game)
- Blockbusters (British game show), the longer-running British version based on the U.S. show
