= Strike It Lucky (Australian game show) =

- Presented by: Ronnie Burns
- Announcer: Craig Huggins
- Country of origin: Australia

Production
- Production companies: Fremantle International; Becker Entertainment

Original release
- Network: Nine Network
- Release: 1994

Strike It Lucky is an Australian television game show that was broadcast on the Nine Network in 1994. It was based on a British show of the same name, which was based on an American show called Strike It Rich. The Australian Strike It Lucky was hosted by Ronnie Burns and co-hosted by Jane Blatchford with Craig Huggins as the announcer. It was produced in the GTV 9 Studios in Melbourne by Fremantle International and Becker Entertainment, who was Fremantle's Australian sales agent at that time.

== Main game ==
Three teams of two compete to win cash and prizes by going across an archway of TV monitors on stage. On a team's turn, one member of that team was given a category with six possible answers. That player then must decide how many answers he/she must give (either two, three, or four) for two, three or four moves on their respective 10 monitored archway. If the player can complete the contract, their partner gets to move across their archway, otherwise the opposing team gets to complete the contract.

Each monitor, bar the last, hides a prize or a "Hot Spot". There was always between five and eight Hot Spots hidden between all three teams' monitors. Each time the team in control reveals a prize, they win that prize and can decide to either bank the prize(s) and pass control to the next team or reveal another monitor. Deciding to keep playing is a risk because if at any time they reveal a Hot Spot, they lose all the prizes earned at that point and control goes the opponents. But, if they can make their required number of moves without hitting the Hot Spot, they automatically bank their prizes.

Along the way, the moving player could uncover some special spaces including:

- Lucky Strike – Striking that screen won $100 is cash which was automatically theirs to keep win or lose the game; also that player would get a free move.
- Free Move – self explanatory

The last monitor of the ten for each team is a question. The team can decide to answer it then or bank their prizes. The monitor before the question normally hides a holiday. A wrong answer forfeits the prizes not banked and the game continues, while a right answer wins the game.

Should time run out before a winner was decided, the team who's furthest ahead wins the game. If the game ended in a tie, the tied players get to answer the final question with the first player to buzz-in with the correct answer winning the game.

== Bonus game ==
Instead of playing the game across the board they now play top, middle or bottom, choosing one of the three monitors in each row to play.

Hidden throughout the 30 monitors are 10 arrows signifying a free move, another 10 are Hot Spots and the final 10 are true or false questions earning a move on a correct answer or a Hot Spot on an incorrect one. These are randomly allocated throughout the board.

On each column of monitors, the winning couple elects to hit the top, middle or bottom one. The aim of the game is for the couple to get from one side to the other without hitting more than three Hot Spots. Winning the bonus game won a prize package.
