= Alan Jones Live =

- Presented by: Alan Jones
- Country of origin: Australia
- Original language: English
- No. of seasons: 1
- No. of episodes: 64

Production
- Running time: 30 minutes

Original release
- Network: Network Ten
- Release: 31 January – 28 April 1994

Alan Jones Live is a nightly Australian current affairs and talk-back television program that aired on Network Ten from 31 January 1994 to 28 April 1994. Hosted by Alan Jones, it aired at 7:00 pm each weeknight, and was repeated at 11:30 pm.

On 28 April 1994, it was announced that program would cease production due to low ratings.

== See also ==
- List of programs broadcast by Network Ten
- List of Australian television series
