= Maddison Gabriel =

Australian model (born 1994)

- Born: Maddison Gabriel; 16 September 1994 (age 32); Tugun, Queensland, Australia
- Modeling information
- Height: 1.74 m (5 ft 8 1/2 in)
- Hair color: Blonde
- Eye color: Blue/Green
- Agency: Fashion Models – Milan; Storm Model Management- London; Chadwick's – Sydney; Elite Models – New York; Tambyn Models – Mother Agency

Maddison Gabriel (born 16 September 1994) is an Australian model who gained notoriety when, at the age of 12, she was controversially named the face of the 2007 Gold Coast Fashion Week.

== Personal life ==
Gabriel was born to Brian Gabriel and Michelle Gabriel and has a sister, Brooke. Gabriel was able to travel to New York, Milan, and London, and also continue her studies at school.

In October 2008, it was reported that convicted American sex predator Martin Robertson had written to the Australian newspaper The Sunday Telegraph from his Texas prison cell to request articles about Gabriel for a book he claimed to be writing. Gabriel's mother criticized the media for widely reporting concerns that her daughter was too young to be a catwalk model, resulting in Robertson learning of her daughter.

== Career ==
=== Gold Coast Fashion Week ===
Gabriel was 12 when she was named the official face of Australia's annual Gold Coast Fashion Week in September 2007 being chosen ahead of models 15 years her senior. Child protection groups raised protests over the 12-year-old's participation. Several public figures, including then-Prime Minister John Howard, Anna Bligh, who was Premier of Queensland at the time, and Federal Opposition Leader Kevin Rudd, raised concerns over Gabriel's age. Gabriel's mother, Michelle Gabriel, later requested an apology from Howard and Rudd for their comments regarding her daughter, and stated that the family was not making money from Gabriel's modelling ventures.

=== Modeling ===
Gabriel was signed by agency Ugly People as the prize for being named as the face of the Gold Coast Fashion Week. She later signed with Tambly Model Management, who became her "mother" agency. Following the Gold Coast Fashion Week, Gabriel generated interest from many international modeling agencies including Chadwick's and Ford Models, but signed with Elite Models in July 2008 with the support of Tamblyn Models. She has since signed with Storm in London and Fashion in Milan and is now represented by Dally's in Brisbane and Chic in Sydney.

She has since appeared in editorials in Elle, Dolly, Creme, Girlfriend, Rush, Limewire, Looks Book, Muse, and Bridesmaid.

=== Other ventures ===
She was featured, along with other models, in Bryan Ferry's video for "You Can Dance", released during the summer of 2010 from his album Olympia. She also appeared as an extra in the Australian drama Water Police. She has worked in New York, London, Milan and Sydney in various roles, including catwalk and photographic modeling.
