= Steve Ryan (author) =

American author (born 1949)

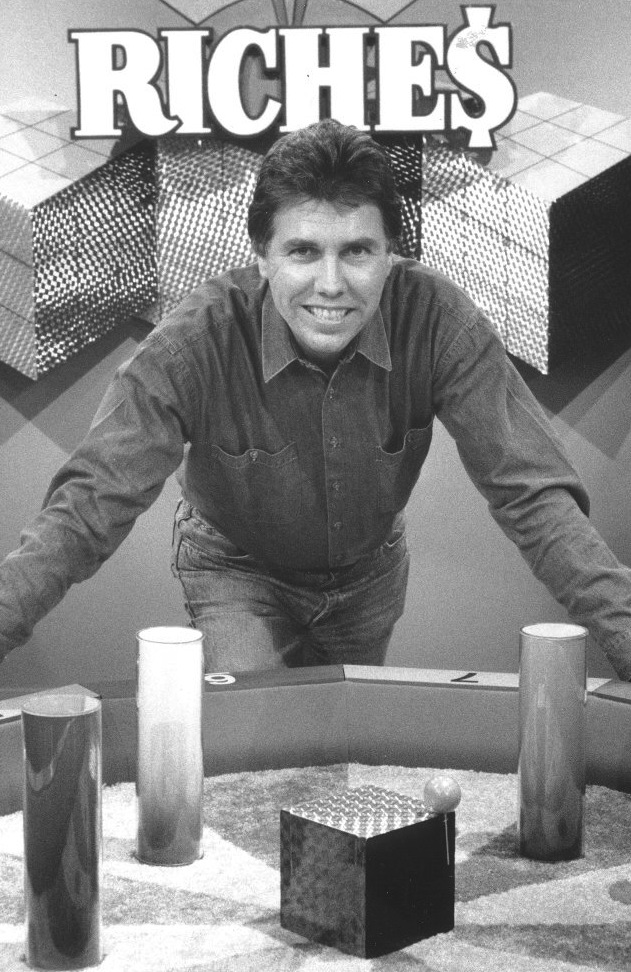
- Ryan in 1994
- Born: February 15, 1949 (age 77); San Diego, California, U.S.
- Occupations: Author and game creator

Steve Ryan (born February 15, 1949) is an American author who specializes in the creation of games and puzzles. Ryan is also a television game show historian and creator. Ryan was a long-standing staff member of Goodson-Todman Productions and Mark Goodson Productions, where he created the concept for the game show Blockbusters. Ryan also created the rebus puzzles for the game show Classic Concentration. He was also a writer and creator of puzzles for the game shows Body Language, Catch Phrase, Password Plus and Trivia Trap.

== Lottery games ==
As senior games executive at Goodson's lottery division, Steve created games with million-dollar payoffs for many state and international lottery game shows including: The Big Spin for California, Bingo-Lotto for Lithuania Lottery, Bonus Bonanza for Massachusetts Lottery, A Chance de Ouro for Brazil Lottery, Flamingo Fortune for Florida Lottery, Illinois Luckiest for Illinois Lottery, Instant Riches for Illinois Lottery, New York Wired for New York Lottery, Powerball: The Game Show for Multi-State Lottery, Second Chance Sweepstakes for Ohio Lottery, Telelotto for Estonia Lottery, Win'n Spin for South Africa Lottery, Zama Zama for South Africa Lottery, and 25th Anniversary Game Show for Pennsylvania Lottery. Some of his many game creations for these lottery shows include “Beach Ball,” “Camelot’s Riches,” “Capsize,” “Coney Island Coaster,” “Force Field,” “Gold Rush,” “High Roller,” “Knockout,” "Mismatch," “Niagara,” “PowerBall Express,” “Skyscraper,” “Splashdown,” “Steeple Chase,” “Thunderball,” “Treasure Quest,” “Vortex,” “Wrecking Ball,” and “Zero Gravity.”

== Puzzles ==
Ryan is recognized as one of the world's most prolific creators of puzzles with thousands of puzzles to his credit. He began his career as a puzzle columnist at Copley News Service where he created several puzzle and game features for readers across America and other English speaking countries. Those features include “Puzzles & Posers” which is a mixed grill of cerebral calisthenics designed to explore player's powers of reason, logic and ingenuity, and “Zig-Zag” the original word maze-puzzle which challenges players to search for words from given categories. Both features have run non-stop from 1973 and 1975 (respectively) to current day. Both of Ryan's features have the distinction of being Copley News Service's longest running features in the history of the news organization. Creators Syndicate absorbed both features when Copley News Service sold in 2008.

== Books ==
Dozens of Steve Ryan books have evolved from his puzzle features and his work in television. Steve self-published his first book in 1975 titled Puzzle Cards. His "Grape Vine" puzzle in that book is recognized as the earliest known puzzle to utilize what is known as the "freeway rule" within a genre of puzzles known as mazes-with-rules as referenced in SuperMazes by Robert Abbott.

Worldwide, many Steve Ryan puzzle books have been translated and published for Chinese, Russian, Czechoslovak, French, Dutch, Portuguese, Spanish, Indian, Malaysian and Indonesian markets.

Ryan is also co-author of The Encyclopedia of TV Game Shows, the most comprehensive book of its kind. This encyclopedia is often referred to as the Bible of the game show industry. As a reference book it documents every game show that has ever appeared in a national market whether it be in cable, syndication or network. Three updated editions have been published to date. The book has been used as a Jeopardy! answer: The answer was, "'Beat the Odds,' 'Music Bingo' and 'Fast Draw' are entries in an encyclopedia of these by Schwartz, Ryan & Wostbrock." A contestant came in with the correct question, "What are game shows?"

== Magazines ==
In addition to the books authored by Steve Ryan, his work has appeared in such magazines as Games, Nick, Nickelodeon, Nick Toons and World of Puzzles in the U.S. and Games & Puzzles in the United Kingdom. Will Shortz, while editor at Games magazine, acknowledged the work of Steve Ryan as some of the best in the world of puzzles.

Puzzle creations by Steve Ryan have been utilized by the Game's National Puzzle Test. His puzzles always rate as visually intriguing, yet with a lower than normal rate of success.

== Box games ==
Stix & Stones, a box game created by Steve Ryan, received the Parents' Choice 2010 Award for new game. After years of challenging fans to solve his brainteasers with pencils, players are asked to put down those pencils and grab a handful of sticks and stones to create images using the fewest possible number of sticks and stones. It's a game that encourages creative thinking with little or no artistic skill required. Ryan likes to say, “If you could play against Pablo Picasso, all you’d have to do is out think him because he has to use the same sticks and stones as you do to create his image."

== Career ==
As a child, Ryan was inspired by the mathematical recreations of Henry Dudeney and Sam Loyd. Later, while studying Art and Design at California State University Long Beach, Steve illustrated his own puzzle and game creations. After decades of work, Ryan's word games, number quizzes, problems in logic, devious dissections, scrambled letters, mazes-with-rules, mathematical recreations and more continue to challenge readers. He sometimes described as the Picasso of Puzzles and Gauguin of Games.

== Published works ==
- Brain Busters (ISBN 0-399-51332-9)
- Challenging Pencil Puzzlers (ISBN 0-8069-8752-9)
- Classic Concentration (ISBN 0-8069-8468-6)
- Clever Lunchbox Puzzles (ISBN 1-4027-1386-X)
- The Encyclopedia of TV Game Shows (ISBN 0-918432-87-1) by David Schwartz, Steve Ryan and Fred Wostbrock
- The Encyclopedia of TV Game Shows, second edition (ISBN 0-8160-3093-6) by David Schwartz, Steve Ryan and Fred Wostbrock
- The Encyclopedia of TV Game Shows, third edition (ISBN 0-8160-3846-5) by David Schwartz, Steve Ryan and Fred Wostbrock
- The Giant Book of Math Fun (ISBN 1-4027-0469-0), edited by Sterling Publishing
- The Giant Book of Puzzles (ISBN 1-4027-1083-6), edited by Sterling Publishing
- Great Rebus Puzzles (ISBN 0-8069-1811-X)
- IQ Boosters (ISBN 978-1-4027-6007-5)
- The Little Giant Encyclopedia of Mensa Mind Teasers (ISBN 0-8069-0155-1), edited by Peter Gordon
- The Little Giant Book Of Brain Teasers (ISBN 0-8069-9711-7), edited by Sterling Publishing
- Lunchbox Puzzles (ISBN 0-8069-8949-1)
- Mighty Mini Rhyming Picture Puzzles (ISBN 0-8069-2893-X)
- Mind-Bending Maze Puzzles (ISBN 978-1-899712-72-4), edited by Heather Dickson
- Mystifying Math Puzzles (ISBN 0-8069-1304-5)
- Our Puzzlerama
- Pencil Puzzlers (ISBN 0-8069-8542-9)
- Puzzle Cards
- Puzzles Posers & Pastimes (ISBN 0-523-40347-X)
- Rhyming Picture Puzzles (ISBN 0-8069-2893-X)
- Sit & Solve Pencil Puzzles (ISBN 1-4027-0712-6)
- Sit & Solve Travel Math Puzzles (ISBN 1-4027-3202-3)
- Test Your Math IQ (ISBN 0-8069-0724-X)
- Test Your Puzzle IQ (ISBN 0-8069-0344-9)
- Test Your Word Play IQ (ISBN 0-8069-0412-7)
- The Ultimate TV Game Show Book (ISBN 978-1-56625-291-1) by Steve Ryan and Fred Wostbrock

== Sources ==
- Abbott, Robert (1997). SuperMazes, p IX-X. Prima Publishing. (ISBN 978-0-7615-0701-7)
- “Student at LB State develops puzzles”, Community Advocate, January 17, 1973
- Jan Worth, “Puzzle Master”, Daily Pilot, November 6, 1974
- Jeanne Potter, “He Creates Fun and Games”, The New-Post, October 16, 1974
- Media Browse, “TV Game Show Guide”, Television/Radio Age, September 19, 1988
- Amy Goldstein, “Concentrated Challenges”, Games Magazine, June 1993, p24-25
- “From The Best New Books”, Games Magazine, August 1993, p28
- Peter Gordon, “Jigsaw Puzzle Rebus”, Games Magazine, February 1993
- “The Year’s Best Puzzle Books”, World Of Puzzles, November 1994
- “From The Best New Books”, Games Magazine, August 1992, p27
- John Hardy, “OC Fireman Pursues Puzzling Hobby”, The Register, January 7, 1975
- “Where, Wolf”, Nickelodeon Magazine, October 1999, p47
- “Obstacles to the Oval Office”, Nickelodeon Magazine, November 2000, p76-77
- “Turkey Trot”, Nickelodeon Magazine, November 2001, p76
- “From Fear To There”, Nickelodeon Magazine, October 2002, p64-65
- “Jellyfish Jam”, Nick Magazine, May 2003, p5
- “Gopher It”, Nickelodeon Magazine, March 2004, p18-19
- “Laugh Tracks”, Nick Magazine, Summer 2005, p17
- “Escape From Desert Island”, Nick Magazine, May 2006, p12-13
- “Cold Play”, Nick Magazine, August 2007, p14-15
