= Stampede (TV series) =

Australian music television show (1994)

Stampede is an Australian country music television show that was broadcast from 10 June 1994 on ABC. It was presented by Bruce Samazan and consisted of 13 episodes of 30 minutes each. It showed film clips, interviews and news.

== See also ==
- List of Australian music television shows
- List of Australian television series
