= Pat Hand =

Australian rules footballer

Personal information
- Full name: Patrick James Hand
- Born: 14 October 1923
- Died: 2 July 1994 (aged 70)
- Original team: Sunshine
- Height: 185 cm (6 ft 1 in)
- Weight: 79 kg (174 lb)
- Position: Defence

Playing career^{1}
Years	Club	Games (Goals)
1943–47, 1949	Footscray	63 (2)
- ^{1} Playing statistics correct to the end of 1949.

Patrick James Hand (14 October 1923 – 2 July 1994) was an Australian rules footballer who played with Footscray in the Victorian Football League (VFL).
