= Michael Pope (producer) =

Australian actor

- Born: Australia
- Occupations: Australian television presenter, producer and actor
- Years active: 1980s–present
- Known for: Bert's Family Feud, The Price Is Right

Michael Pope is an Australian voice-over announcer, warm-up comedian, and producer. He is best known as a producer of Nine Network's Bert's Family Feud as well as The Price Is Right on the same network.

== Early life and education ==
Pope graduated from Flinders Drama Centre at Flinders University in Adelaide, South Australia.

== Career ==
Pope is best known as a producer of Nine Network's Bert's Family Feud as well as The Price Is Right on the same network.

He has also hosted shows—such as Seven Network's Blockbusters and Total Recall—and worked as an announcer and presenter on Network Ten's Battle of the Sexes.

He has "warmed up" the audience on numerous occasions for all major Australian Networks, including the shows The AFL Footy Show, Who Wants to Be a Millionaire, Talkin' 'Bout Your Generation, So You Think You Can Dance, Dancing with The Stars, Australia's Got Talent, The Logies, the Arias, and Q&A.

Michael also hosted Cartoon Connection in Sydney, NSW back in the 1980s on Channel 7. He used to alternate with Alex Wileman, and they would both co-host it on Saturday. The show was pre-recorded and not live. Cartoon Connection used to start with the black and white theme "ATN Channel 7 Sydney bids you welcome."
