= Ask No Questions =

1986 British TV game show

- Genre: Game show
- Created by: John Junkin
- Presented by: John Junkin
- Starring: Carol Vorderman
- Country of origin: United Kingdom
- Original language: English
- No. of series: 2
- No. of episodes: 37

Production
- Running time: 30 minutes (inc. adverts)
- Production company: Yorkshire Television

Original release
- Network: Yorkshire Television (1986); ITV (1987)
- Release: 1 February 1986 – 3 June 1987

Ask No Questions is a British game show that originally aired as a regional programme for Yorkshire Television in 1986 on Saturdays, then it became networked for most ITV regions in 1987.

== Transmissions ==
Series	Start date	End date	Episodes
1	1 February 1986	15 March 1986	7
2	27 March 1987	3 June 1987	30

=== Regional transmissions information ===
==== 1986 ====
The first series only aired in the Yorkshire region on Saturdays.

==== 1987 ====
The second series aired in the rest of the regions, but it was not networked:

- Border, Tyne Tees and Yorkshire: Started on 27 March and finished on 3 June. Mondays, Wednesdays and Fridays at 5:15pm.
- LWT: Started on 27 March and finished on 28 August. Fridays at 5:15pm. Not all episodes were broadcast.
- UTV: Started on 27 March and finished on mid-July. ??? at 5:15pm.
- HTV Started on 30 March and finished July. Mondays and Wednesdays at 5:15pm.
- Scottish: Started on 9 April and finished in August. at 3:00pm/3:30pm.
- Anglia: Started on April and finished on May. ??? at 9:50am.
- Grampian: Started on 19 August and finished on 24 September. Wednesday to Friday at 5.10pm before switching to 3.00pm for the last 2 weeks
- TVS and Channel Television: Weekly at 3:00pm.
- Central, Granada and TSW: Did not air the series.
