= Morgan Featherstone =

Australian model

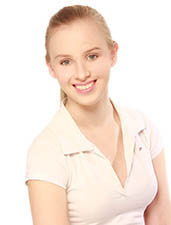
- Morgan Featherstone
- Born: 20 October 1994 (age 32); Brisbane, Queensland, Australia
- Modeling information
- Height: 5 ft 11 in (1.80 m)
- Hair color: Blonde
- Eye color: Blue

Morgan Featherstone (born 20 October 1994) is a former fashion model based in Melbourne.

== Career ==
Featherstone's modeling career began at six months of age when she appeared in a national Australian Dairy Farmers cheese commercial and she quickly became one of Australia's top child models. She was the subject of controversy when, at 8 years of age, fashion photos of her were displayed around the world. Featherstone's pictures were used to market goods in the Australian and Asian markets, but they generated a public backlash when her mature poses were seen as the naturalized sexualization of young girls' bodies. According to her mother, Amy Dean, looking older was not the intention.

The publicity generated helped to boost her career; she flew to Hollywood to audition for roles in the soap opera The Bold and the Beautiful and the drama Charmed, and she was also signed with a cosmetics company in a deal worth tens of thousands of dollars and signed with model agents in Berlin, Tokyo and Los Angeles. She was also the subject of German and British documentaries, and signed a financial contract with Scottish documentary makers Wark Clements in 2004.

Featherstone was the youngest ever cover model on "Who Weekly" magazine (25 August 2003) and has also appeared on the covers of Australian magazines New Idea (twice), Woman's Day, London's celebrity magazine Celebs (23 May 2004) and numerous others worldwide. Photos of Featherstone with celebrities such as Delta Goodrem, Cameron Diaz, Alyssa Milano, Rose McGowan, Kiss, Cold Chisel, the Veronicas, Anthony Mundine and Brian McFadden have appeared in numerous magazines around the world.

Featherstone was used as the feature model in newspaper stories (Courier Mail 14 July 2006) based on research conducted which suggested good-looking people are more intelligent. The article highlighted her academic achievements countering suggestions that her modeling career would hamper her schoolwork. Despite intense media speculation that her modeling career would cause long-term harm to her development it appears from media articles that the opposite has occurred with journalists commenting on her friendly and down to earth personality.

This was highlighted in September 2007 when Featherstone appeared in a two-page article in Sydney's Daily Telegraph (Daily Telegraph 20 September 2007) with the headline "From Child Model to Model Child" and on Channel 9's "A Current Affair" highlighting her modeling and academic achievements and detailing her wishes to be involved in animal conservation. She rejected claims that her modeling career ruined her childhood and said she would be happy to stop modeling if it meant she could realise her dreams of working with animals.

In November 2007 Featherstone held a fashion parade in Brisbane City that raised $10 000 for charity. In October 2009 Featherstone organised $5000 worth of prizes and personally sponsored the photography for the Downs Syndrome Association of Queensland's Annual Gala Ball.

Featherstone appeared on Australian current affairs program "Today Tonight" (26 February 2008) in a story that labelled her as "Australia's youngest home owner" where she proudly showed off her 4 bedroom, 3 bathroom house she was in the middle of renovating.

In the same week Featherstone's photo was used as a background photo on Australian television breakfast program "Sunrise" for an interview with Doctor Karen Brooks about bad role models for children. Also featured in the interview were Paris Hilton and Britney Spears. Brooks has criticised Featherstone in the media about being a bad example for other children numerous times since 2003. Featherstone has stated that she has never met Brooks but "she is allowed to have her opinion about me. Miss Brooks has never asked to meet me but I would be happy to as I'm sure that she would rather base her assessments on me personally rather than on a photograph of me". When asked whether this criticism upset her Featherstone replied "not at all, I don't worry when people say bad things about me. They don't know me and are only guessing. I'm happy with myself and my life and I hope they are as well".

Australian current affairs show "Today Tonight" arranged for Featherstone (at her suggestion) to be assessed by Doctor Phil Jauncey, a renowned psychologist known for his work with leading sports stars, to determine whether her modelling career had been of any detriment to her with Jauncey stating that, in his opinion, "Morgan is a happy child and her career is doing her no harm" which contradicted Brooks opinion that Morgan (who she had never met) was destined for psychological harm due to her modeling career.

On 22 March 2008 Featherstone was interviewed on Australian radio where she was asked what models she admired, to which Featherstone replied "I don't admire models. Let's face it, it's not rocket science. It's fun work and you get paid well but I don't think modeling is something to be admired for".

Featherstone was used in stories on teenage models that appeared on Australian current affairs program "Today Tonight" (11 April 2008 and 20 May 2008) along with 14-year-old Polish model Monika Jagaciak with both models being banned from appearing in Fashion Weeks due to their ages. Featherstone was again criticised for her involvement in the modeling industry and these concerns were heightened when Featherstone travelled to Hong Kong in June 2008 and appeared in numerous advertising campaigns which many critics believed portrayed Featherstone as being in her late teens. Local media referred to Featherstone as "Australia's supertween model".

Featherstone was featured on Australia's highest ranking television show "60 Minutes" (22 June 2008) where she spoke openly about her modeling career and how much she enjoyed it. In a related story Featherstone was asked what she thought of Brisbane Fashion Week banning models under the age of 16 from the catwalk to which Featherstone replied "I'm happy to wait until I'm 16 to model older clothes. It really is no big deal".

Featherstone appeared on Australian current affairs show "Today Tonight" (4 August 2008) as the featured model for a new hair straightener again raising concerns as to whether she was too young to be associated with such a product.

In 2018 Featherstone was working as a paralegal at a Melbourne law firm.
