= Blockbusters (Australian game show) =

1990s Australian children's gameshow

- Genre: Gameshow
- Presented by: Michael Pope
- Theme music composer: Alan Hawkshaw
- Opening theme: "Sportsworld"
- Ending theme: As above
- Country of origin: Australia
- Original language: English
- No. of seasons: 4

Production
- Production locations: Brisbane, Queensland
- Running time: 22 minutes
- Production companies: Fremantle Telegame; Becker Entertainment

Original release
- Network: Seven Network
- Release: 15 July 1991 – 13 May 1994

Blockbusters is an Australian children's game show, broadcast on the Seven Network, where players from two schools competed over the course of a week (five episodes), in a rolling format, where games could be started in the middle of an episode, and stopped and continued on the next episode. The school team earning the most points (based on questions answered from the main game, except tie-breaks) won a major prize for their school, such as an encyclopedia. The show was hosted by Michael Pope. It ran in Australia from 1991 to 1994. It was produced by a partnership between Fremantle International and Becker Entertainment in association with Mark Goodson Productions.

The game board consisted of 20 interlocking hexagons, arranged in five columns of four. Each hexagon contained a letter of the alphabet. A contestant would choose one of the letters, and would be asked a general-knowledge trivia question whose correct answer began with the chosen letter. (A typical question was something like, "What 'P' is a musical instrument with 88 keys?" The answer would be a piano.)

Two students from each school played in each match. Similar to the 1987 American version of the show, the shorter path alternated between the teams in the first two games, and a 4x4 tie-break game board was used in the event of the first two games in a match being split between the two teams. Five points were earned towards the school team's weekly total for each question correctly answered, with no points scored during tie-breaks (nor for Gold Runs).

The winner of the match went on to play the Gold Run bonus round. The board consisted of a pattern of hexagons similar to that of the main game, but the hexagons had 2 to 5 letters inside them; those letters were the initials of the correct answer. (For instance, if a contestant chose "BS" and the host said "Where people kiss in Ireland", the correct answer would be "Blarney Stone.") If a contestant guessed correctly, the hexagon turned gold. However, if the contestant guessed incorrectly or passed, it turned black, blocking the player's path; it was then up to the contestant to work around it. The object was to horizontally connect the left and right sides of the board within 60 seconds (or before blocking off all possible horizontal connections).

Gold Run questions had two-word answers, with a successful run resulting in a small prize for that player and their teammate. As there was no consolation prize for each question in a failed Gold Run, the game would be terminated early if the board became completely blocked from black spaces.

== Board game ==
A board game was released by Croner in the 90s.
