= Jenny Schecter =

Fictional character from the television series The L Word

- The L Word character
- Portrayed by: Mia Kirshner
- Duration: 2004–09
- First appearance: 18 January 2004
- Last appearance: 8 March 2009
- Created by: Ilene Chaiken
In-universe information
- Occupation: Writer; Grocery clerk Waitress; Stripper; Movie director
- Mother: Sandy Schecter
- Stepfather: Warren Ziskin
- Husband: Tim Haspel (2004)

Jennifer "Jenny" Diane Schecter is a fictional character from the American Showtime television drama series The L Word, played by Mia Kirshner. Jenny debuted on-screen during the pilot episode and remained until the series' final episode. Jenny became well documented in the media for her outlandish plots. Jenny was created by series creator Ilene Chaiken, based on herself as a younger woman living in the lesbian community. Chaiken implemented a series of changes to the character, one of which being the inclusion of a sexual abuse story line and self-harm, which some critics observed as being attempts to make her likable in the LGBTQ community. One storyline that gained mainstream attention was adopting a homeless dog, only to have it put down for personal gain. Other story lines include stripping, writing novels, coming out, directing a film, affairs, and her possible murder. The final season is based around the lead-up to her death, during which Jenny made herself extremely unpopular with her friends, who became suspects.

Jenny's character was unpopular with both fans and critics throughout the entire series because of her frequent narcissistic tendencies, her prima donna ways, her egotistical attitude, irresponsibility, frequent self-pity, and selfish persona. She has also been labeled a "love to hate" character. The majority of critics have been intrigued by her "polarising personality" and branded it as one of the main reasons to watch the series. New York magazine gave a large amount of praise to Jenny and on one occasion stated: "Jenny Schecter is The L Word, and the death of her is the death of the show." Kirshner received critical praise for her portrayal of the character. Kirshner has stated she loved playing Jenny because she felt like a brand new character during each season. She has also stated that it is difficult for people to like the character as she can be "very despicable" and even the LGBTQ community does not like her because of her "duplicity and confusion".

== Character creation and casting ==
Series creator Ilene Chaiken created Jennifer. She based her on her own past experiences of coming out and dealing with the everyday life in the lesbian community as a younger woman. Like Jenny, Chaiken had befriended a group of lesbians who ran a cafe and had her first sexual encounter with a female. Actress Mia Kirshner was cast in the role. Chaiken admitted she had been searching for the right actress to play Jennifer "for a long time". Kirshner auditioned via video tape, Chaiken recalled that upon viewing it she thought Kirshner was "stunning". She thought Kirshner had "riveting beauty that is unlike anyone else's, and she was so deep and intense."

Kirshner would often express her concern that she was not challenged enough or not making Jennifer as "deep enough" as she could be. Chaiken said it was these qualities that made Kirshner "the bravest and boldest of actors" and branded her "utterly fearless" in her approach to Jenny.

== Character development ==
=== Characterization ===
Throughout her duration on the series, Jenny went on a journey from the very first episode, which portrayed her as a selfish egotist; many observers have perceived her as a narcissist, and even as a borderline sociopath. This latter assessment was based early on around her recurrent lying, and the fact she seems to excuse her own cheating in the first few seasons as a corollary of empowerment and as research for her book: which features an experimentalist female character who is evidently herself. Kirshner has described Jenny as mostly being duplicitous and confused. Jenny often acted "utterly impulsive". Kirshner said it is very hard for people in the series and the viewers to like Jenny because she is "a very despicable character who lies, cheats, behaves and treats other people horribly for no reason, and is extremely selfish, self-indulgent and so terribly truthful... and she does not hesitate to hide any of it."

"No, not Jenny. She's not a lesbian icon. The character isn't loved by the gay community at all, because of her duplicity and confusion."

— Kirshner on the gay community's perception of Jenny. (2010)

Jenny is also shown to be very hypocritical. She cheated on Tim and even kissed a woman in front of him for the gratification of Tim's friends, not caring that it hurt him. On the other hand, she expected Tim to be faithful to her and even after they broke up, gave him grief for starting a new relationship. She expects instant forgiveness and absolution for the wrong she does to others, but when wrong (real or imagined) is done to her, she will hold a vindictive grudge and make every attempt to torment the person long after they tried to make amends, even taking haughty, sadistic glee in doing so.

Matthew Gilbert of The Boston Globe described Jenny stating: "Dreary, confused, introverted narcissist [...] downcast, secretive, almost Goth in her black moodiness, she is the epitome of an unhappy egotist. She is so consumed with the ups and downs of her own depression and self-loathing, she just doesn't have the energy to look outward. Her misery is her mirror, and she's forever gazing into it." New York Magazine describe Jenny as a capricious yet obnoxious type of character adding that she can be patronizing. They also observe her as looking "fabulous, fun, and sexy but her downfall is her annoying side." Diane Shipley of The Guardian branded Jenny a "whiny egomaniac". Lesbian magazine Curve brands Jenny a "narcissistic navel-gazer".

=== Sexuality ===
When Jenny is introduced on-screen she arrives in Los Angeles to stay with her boyfriend Tim Haspel (Eric Mabius). Tim is described as the person who makes Jenny "feel the safest in the world". She soon becomes aware her neighbors Tina Kennard (Laurel Holloman) and Bette Porter (Jennifer Beals) are lesbians. Kirshner said that Jenny becomes intrigued by lesbians and attends their party. Jenny meets Marina Ferrer (Karina Lombard), who senses that Jenny wants some danger in her life. When Marina kisses her, Jenny sees her life going into a tailspin and forces her to reckon with herself. Jenny acknowledges her passion for Marina, but realizes that being unfaithful will ruin "the one stable relationship she's ever had". However, they begin an affair. In the show's companion book "The L Word: Welcome to our planet", they describe Jenny's confusion as leaving her "unmoored". She was alone in battling the heartache, along with facing "an overwhelming identity crisis" in a place that was not yet her home.

Kirshner opined that the situation with Jenny was "not pretty". Jenny loves two people at once. She is the kind of character "who will just grab experiences because of the holes inside her [...] she will leave the casualties in the wake behind her." Kirshner often pushed and encouraged for more truth. She made Jenny's sex scenes "darker, painful, and sometimes not so pretty to watch". Kirshner did not mind portraying sex scenes with other females. She described them as "more fun and easier" and that she genuinely felt there was "nothing to be ashamed of." For her there was a "comfort level that is beautiful". Kirshner had never appeared nude in previous roles, but she requested to go nude as Jenny in certain scenes to add to the reality.

Chaiken decided to keep audiences guessing about Jenny's sexuality. She stated that whilst sexuality can be fluid, that Jenny's sexuality "definitely exists on the edge of fluidity". This was because she had planned to have Jenny romantically involved mostly with females, but with some males too.

=== Sexual abuse ===
One of Jenny's story lines in season two was her revelation of being sexually abused as a child. The events were portrayed in a series of flashbacks and dream sequences. Yet, this left viewers confused about what actually happened to Jenny. During an interview with LGBTQ monthly magazine The Advocate, Chaiken commented about the story line: "Well we all know it was an incident of sexual abuse. I had not wanted to be more explicit about it than that – one because memory of trauma is very strange. Who knows what happened to Jenny? Jenny doesn't necessarily know herself."

Chaiken also didn't want to portray Jenny's ordeal in an explicit manner, confirming this she said: "I am loath to portray rape as a filmmaker. I think it is really hard to do it without somehow becoming complicit and exploitative. And so as much as it's important to talk about it, I wanted to be vague and not milk it." Chaiken has also admitted that the use of dream sequences involving Jenny were not a successful inclusion, but claimed it was necessary to portray Jenny coming to terms with her abuse. Heather Hogan of AfterEllen criticized the story line because there was no conclusion to it, also stating it was never explored enough, leading everyone to think she was just a jerk.

=== Transformation ===
Jenny was negatively received amongst TV critics and viewers from the very first episode after she cheated on her boyfriend, Tim, with another woman for no clear reason. This prompted Chaiken to implement a series of changes to Jenny to help make her more likable. Chaiken defended Jenny stating: "I'm well aware of the response to Jenny. I love the character, and I love that people are passionate about her. I know there are a lot of people who just can't stand her. And that's why it's so important to have that character in the mix." Kirshner defended Jenny stating: "Jenny's a very controversial character. I think the great thing about her is the fact that she's so flawed." During season two Jenny is seen coming out, getting her hair cut and becoming best friends with Shane McCutcheon (Katherine Moennig). AfterEllen.com stated that Jenny cutting off her hair was a defining moment in her development because it also symbolized her cutting all of the bad stuff that happened before out of her life. Jenny's transition continued into season three, Chaiken stated: "We find Jenny coming together, I predict this [...] that Jenny will be more likable and accessible to the audience than she has ever been. She's recovering."

In 2009, Chaiken was still confused over Jenny's bad reception, of why it might be she said: "People read into the character that she was a manipulator, self-absorbed, and a trouble maker who puts other people in service of her own neurotic agenda. I think people react so strongly because Jenny is just a mess in the way that so many people are."

Of her character's changes after season five, Kirshner stated: "I think she'll continue to be just like a tumbleweed and a car crash and I'm happy for that, I don't want it to be wrapped up. She'll never be normal and that's just the way it is." Responding to the criticism Jenny has received, Kirshner states: "Well, I agree with what's said about the character for the most part. But again ... it's my job. So, I mean, it's a fun character."

=== Death ===
In December 2008 it was announced that the show's creators had decided to kill the character off. It was confirmed that Jenny would still appear throughout the season in a flashback format. The first episode of the final season starts with Jenny's death. However the final series focuses on the events leading up to her death. Chaiken revealed that each episode would focus and tease with another motive. She described how it would play out, stating: "There's one character at the beginning of each show who comes forward with the motive of the moment. This would be my reason for killing Jenny." The story line was described as a "sub-plot" which would define the final season, but not "overpower" it. However, when the final episode aired there was no reveal to who killed Jenny. Showtime released a mini-series titled "Interrogation Tapes" online, via the official website. Each video featured a fellow character being interviewed over the death of Jenny - although the killer was still not revealed. Kate Aurthur of Los Angeles Times questioned if viewers would still want to watch the season after Jenny is killed. New York later gave a large amount of praise to Jenny commenting: "Jenny Schecter is The L Word, and the death of her is the death of the show." Diane Shipley of The Guardian stated her death was long overdue. Websites started selling "I killed Jenny Schecter" merchandise. Lydia Martin of The Miami Herald said Chaiken was being manipulative not revealing Jenny's killer, so viewers would watch their online series. She also wanted to know who killed her because it did not give a "decent" ending to the show. Heather Hogan of AfterEllen stated that Jenny's ending was a dis-service to the character having never found out who killed her.

When a sequel to the original series, called The L Word: Generation Q, was announced in 2019, main actress Jennifer Beals was asked about the issue of Jenny's death in an interview with People Now, and she answered, "I can guarantee there will be resolution for fans on that issue (...) Complete resolution. It has to be answered." Finally, in the second episode of the first season "Less Is More", aired on 15 December 2019, Jenny's death was described in passing as a suicide, a "revelation" that was described by some fans as anticlimactic.

== Storylines ==
=== Backstory ===
Jenny grew up in Skokie, Illinois with her mother Sandy, in an Orthodox Jewish household. She disliked her step-father Warren and wanted to leave home as soon as she could. Jenny became a writer of fiction at a young age, she completed her Master of Fine Arts at the Iowa Writer's Workshop at the University of Iowa. She won a major literary award and has had one of her short stories published. Jenny dates a man named Tim who she moved to Los Angeles to start a new life with.

=== 2004–09 ===
In season one, Jenny arrives to stay with her boyfriend Tim. On her very first night in Los Angeles, Jenny attends a party with her neighbors Tina and Bette where she meets Marina. Despite knowing of her relationship with Tim, Marina ambushes Jenny in the toilet and kisses her, and they start an affair, showing Jenny fighting her feelings and questioning her sexuality. Jenny begins to outright lie to Tim and everyone else about her infidelity. When Tim finds out about the affair, he forces Jenny to marry him, but they divorce soon after. She later goes back to Marina, goes on a date with Dana Fairbanks (Erin Daniels) and briefly dates a much older woman, Robin (Anne Ramsay).

In season two, Tim decides to move out and leave town - his faith and trust in Jenny - and humanity in general - destroyed by her infidelity and outright deception. Jenny becomes best friends with Shane, and invites her to move in. She begins a relationship with Shane's ex-girlfriend Carmen de la Pica Morales (Sarah Shahi), but Carmen later goes back to Shane. Jenny starts having flashbacks of her childhood in which it is revealed she was sexually abused. Jenny starts writing another book and taking a college writing class to improve her fiction skills. Jenny's teacher accuses her of being a non-fiction writer because of her prose resembling Jenny's past. Mark Wayland (Eric Lively), a filmmaker who moves into the house to help pay their rent, starts spying on Jenny, Carmen and Shane, with hidden cameras. Jenny is hurt when the truth is revealed because she trusted him. Jenny becomes depressed and in the season finale she self-harms by cutting herself with razor blades.

In season three, Jenny is sent away to a clinic in Illinois home town. There she meets Moira Sweeney (Daniel Sea), who is transitioning into a man, Max. They begin a relationship and return home. Max begins to take the first steps of his transition. Max's hormone blockers result in his temper flaring; he starts being slightly abusive to Jenny. Jenny later decides to end their relationship. She then writes a story about all her friends for The New Yorker.

In season four, the story later gets turned into a stage play, then a film titled Lez Girls. Marina briefly returns during the play, portraying Jenny's character. Jenny realizes she is over Marina after being propositioned by her. Jenny becomes more mentally unbalanced when she adopts a dog to get close to a female veterinarian. The vet is a girlfriend of a columnist who gave Jenny's story a bad review. Pretending to be distraught, Jenny has the dog put down. Jenny begins secretly dating the woman as part of her plan to ruin her girlfriend's career. When Jenny is found out, she accused of being manipulative and evil.

In season five, while filming Lez Girls, she is promoted as the director. Jenny hires Adele Channing (Malaya Rivera Drew) as her personal assistant. Jenny then starts a relationship with the film's biggest star, Niki Stevens (Kate French). While on a camping trip, Jenny and Niki make a private sex tape. Adele then steals the tape and makes numerous copies. Niki, who is a closeted lesbian and needs to stay in the closet for the sake of her career, is shocked when Adele reveals her plans to send the tapes to the media if Jenny doesn't hand the director's job to her. She stands down and asks Niki to join her; they split up when she doesn't join her. Shane later sleeps with Niki, leaving Jenny heartbroken.

In season six, it is revealed that Jenny is dead. The series then reverts three months before the incident, picking up from the previous series finale. Shane's ex-girlfriend Molly Kroll (Clementine Ford) gives Jenny a letter of apology addressed to Shane. Jenny hides the letter so Shane will not find it. Tina defends Jenny after the original film reels of Lez Girls are stolen, preventing the film from being released. Jenny later starts a relationship with Shane. Jenny steals Alice Pieszecki's (Leisha Hailey) ideas for a play which sparks a feud between the pair. Alice tries to convince everyone that the ideas were hers. Jenny keeps up the pretense and convinces everyone it is an original idea. Alice tries to break Shane and Jenny up to no avail. Jenny then reveals to Dylan Moreland (Alexandra Hedison) that Helena Peabody (Rachel Shelley) and the rest of their friends are setting her up to find out if she is in love with Helena or her money. Jenny starts teasing Max by buying him feminine gifts for his pregnancy. This alienates Shane and is worsened by her trust issues involving Shane's fidelity. Shane sleeps with Niki once more and their relationship reaches a breaking point. Helena later finds out that Jenny revealed the truth to Dylan. This makes Helena desperate for revenge on her old friend. Tina and Shane later find Molly's letter in the loft. Tina then finds the stolen originals of Lez Girls and she goes to confront Jenny.

Jenny spends her final days putting together a film of memories for Bette and Tina. The film contains friends past and present sharing their best moments. During the going-away party held for Bette and Tina, who are planning on moving to New York, they watch the film and Jenny is found dead in the swimming pool in the back yard. It is assumed that she either fell or was pushed from the landing above the back steps, which is unfinished and lacks a proper railing. Because so many people have been offended, betrayed and hurt by Jenny, there are many suspects and they are interrogated.

In The L Word: Generation Q, Bette, the last person to see her alive, claims that Jenny died by suicide.

== Reception ==
In the book Blood Moon's GT Gay and Lesbian Film, Darwin Porter brands Jenny "one of the most annoying, needy characters on television" and calls her a "lost damaged soul". Fellow cast member Leisha Hailey has commented that Jenny is at her best when she is spiraling out of control. Hillary Frey of The New York Observer opined that Jenny provided "voyeuristic pleasure" for straight females in season one. She said she believed Jenny's confusion to whom she should be with was plausible. Also adding the fact she gradually became self-obsessed – yet still conveyed the "thrill and pleasure of a fresh sexual experience", while portraying the sadness.

Jenny was criticized by Matthew Gilbert of The Boston Globe for her narcissistic tendencies. Kera Bolonik of New York magazine stated that "Jenny-bashing" became a spectator sport from her inception. She also described Jenny's development as going through different stages stating: "Season 1: Selfish Jenny, Season 2: Victimized Jenny, Season 3: Heartless Jenny, Season 4: Vindictive Jenny, Season 5: Bitchy and narcissistic Jenny, Season 6: Dead Jenny." New York magazine later praised Jenny stating: "We don't condone Jenny's narcissism, her prima-donna-ness, or her questionable writing skills. But she is highly entertaining – and more important, her polarizing personality exposes the people around her." In 2009 by the time season six was on air, the magazine claimed that Jenny was one step away from a Lesbian backlash, joking: "If only she would sing an acoustic version of the show's ear-melting theme song intermittently during the next episode to ensure that the entire Sapphic nation hits the streets bearing torches and pitchforks, all calling her name."

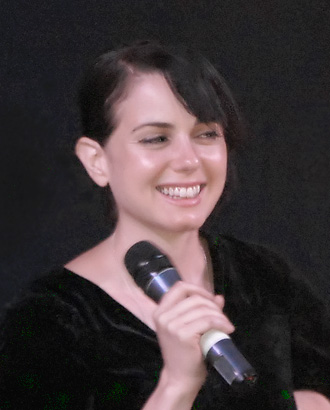
Mia Kirshner (pictured) played Jenny during all six seasons.

New York magazine also describe the series and how Jenny took on the whole character traits of the show: "Like Jenny, The L Word was, at any given moment, capricious, obnoxious, patronizing, fabulous, fun, sexy, non sequitur, overreaching, under-reaching, annoying, and yes, unforgettable. Not one other character besides Jenny embodied the whole character of the show." British lesbian magazine Diva call Jenny "the girl we love to hate." They also opined that "poor old Jenny didn't have much going for her from the start." That after her failed romances with Tim and Marina, she "got all pretentious" when she became an author. They also branded her the most hated lesbian character since Joan Ferguson (Maggie Kirkpatrick) on Prisoner: Cell Block H, credited most of the hatred upscaling when she had her dog put down and praised Kirshner for rising to the challenge of playing her.

Jennifer Thomas of Pioneer Press compiled a list of 12 of the best TV characters of 2009; Jenny was number 7 on her list and stated: "Jenny is a rare combination of destruction, self-destruction, naivety and insanity. You can't help but want to strangle her, but then she goes all needy and fragile." She also claimed that the season finale was a let-down, but Jenny would have been happy that even in death she was the center of attention and meddling in her friends lives.

Thomas has also said: "Jenny has always been a complex, and fascinating character, who you occasionally want to slap and shake. (Or, in the case of the dog, just, well, murder her.) Without her, though, the show wouldn't be half as interesting. Just when you think you've seen every bit of crazy Jenny can dish out, she digs deep and finds some new neuroticism. She's fragile, but she's steel-spined when it comes to accepting responsibility for the havoc she wreaks in her life and everyone else's."

Matthew Gilbert of the Boston Globe compiled his list of most annoying TV characters. Jenny came second on the list and he stated: "Wow. The gods of narcissism blessed Jenny bigtime. She was just too, too self-centered. She sucked the life out of everyone who crossed her path." He also opined that Kirshner's portrayal of Jenny's "vanity and chameleon-like qualities" was perhaps too convincing. He perceived scriptwriters as eventually understanding the "profundity of Jenny's annoying effect", and decided to escalate it. Gilbert concluded that in early seasons, when writers wanted the audience's sympathy with Jenny's journey of self-realization, he "wanted her to leave The Planet for good." Regarding Jenny's mental state, Lydia Martin from The Miami Herald quipped "(Marina) sauntered into The Planet just to fuck with Jenny's head. As if Jenny's head needed the encouragement".

== Bibliography ==
- Porter, Darwin (2006). Blood Moon's GT Gay and Lesbian Film. Blood Moon Productions. ISBN 9780974811840.
- Bolonik, Kera (2005). The L word : welcome to our planet. Simon & Schuster. ISBN 0-7432-9133-6.
- Mask, Mia (2009). Divas on screen: Black women in American film. University of Illinois Press. ISBN 978-0-252-03422-0.
