= Bette Porter =

Bette Porter-Kennard
- First appearance: Pilot (episode 1.01)
- Last appearance: Last Word (episode 6.08)
- Created by: Ilene Chaiken
- Portrayed by: Jennifer Beals

In-universe information
- Gender: Female
- Occupation: Former Director at the California Arts Center, Former Dean of School of Arts, California University, Co-Owner and Partner of Wentworth-Porter Art Gallery
- Family: Spouse: Tina Kennard (Married); Lovers: Coleman, Alice Pieszecki, Candace Jewell, Nadia, Jodi Lerner, Felicity Adams, Gigi Ghorbani, Pippa Pascal; Father: Melvin Porter; Half-Sibling: Kit Porter; Children: Angelica Porter-Kennard; Nephew: David Waters

Bette Porter is a fictional character on the Showtime television network series The L Word and its sequel The L Word: Generation Q, played by Jennifer Beals.

Though Beals's performance was met with wide acclaim, Bette's characterization, as well as her relationship with her partner, Tina Kennard, received a more mixed response, with both fans and critics debating whether Bette reinforces positive lesbian relationships or glorifies narcissistic personality disorder, and questioning if Bette's behavioral traits would have been considered acceptable or politically correct had it been a heterosexual man in her place.

== Fictional character biography ==
=== Before The L Word ===
Bette is introduced as an affluent, Ivy League-educated lesbian of African-American and Caucasian heritage. She grew up in Philadelphia and was an art history major at Yale, where she began having sex with her boyfriend, Coleman. They both realized they were gay shortly after, with Bette developing a crush on her art history professor, Danica Palmer (Lifesize: 306). Eventually, she came out as a lesbian, and fell for her bisexual friend, Kelly. After Kelly rejected her advances, Bette grew depressed to the brink of suicide.

After graduation, Bette moved on, and dated Alice Pieszecki briefly. Bette once fingered Alice while they were at the opera Lakmé (during The Flower Duet). Though their relationship ended when Bette cheated on Alice, the two remained close friends afterwards.

Bette met her future partner, Tina, while Tina was on a date at the Bette Porter Gallery with her then-boyfriend Eric. An instant attraction formed between the two of them. Bette noticed Tina's right earring had fallen off, and Tina supposedly put it back on. Later that night, Tina returned to the gallery to retrieve the lost earring. Bette had kept it for her. While Tina was picking it from her hand, Bette kissed her.

=== The L Word ===
==== Season one ====
Though Bette and Tina's relationship appears to their friends as very strong, it is revealed that they are having problems and visiting a therapist, mostly due to Bette's career at the California Arts Center, her domineering attitude and her tendency to become verbally abusive when things do not go her way. At Bette's urging, Tina gives up her own career in order to have a child, leaving Bette as the sole breadwinner. Things are complicated by Bette's homophobic father Melvin flatly refusing to acknowledge Tina's baby as his grandchild, and Bette's difficult but improving relationship with her older half-sister Kit, a recovering alcoholic who has often let her down.

Tina, however, suffers a miscarriage, which takes a heavy toll on Bette, and when Tina decides to become involved in a charitable organization, Bette finds that their careers make it almost impossible for them to spend any time together. At the same time, Bette finds herself drawn to Candace Jewell, a carpenter temporarily working at the CAC who makes a pass at her despite knowing of her relationship with Tina. Bette subsequently begins an affair with Candace to fulfil her sexual desires. When Tina discovers the affair, she flies into a rage and, in the ensuing physical fight, Bette forces herself sexually on Tina, who eventually submits. Tina still leaves Bette and moves out of their house.

==== Season two ====
In the second season, Bette resumes her affair with Candace, but soon becomes desperate to make amends for her betrayal, and finds that her break-up with Tina is disrupting all the other elements of her life. Her job becomes an increasing pressure, especially when Tina's new lover, Helena Peabody, is added to the Board of Directors, and her boss hires another curator who threatens Bette's elevated position. Tina refuses to forgive Bette, insinuating that she is only trying to mend their relationship because Candace is not sexually fulfilling enough for her.

At first, Bette feels isolated from Alice (who hypocritically accuses Bette of being a "sex addict" while she herself is having an affair with Dana, who is engaged to be married) and the others, who she feels have mainly taken Tina's side in their argument rather than remain neutral. Although Shane and Jenny are both supportive of her (mostly because both are also both promiscuous, having cheated on their lovers as well), it takes a while for Bette to feel on good terms with Alice again. After Tina begins to see Helena, however, the group appear to rally around Bette, who is now aware that Tina is pregnant again. Learning that Tina got herself inseminated before their breakup, Bette demands to be part of the baby's life, but Tina refuses.

Matters are further complicated when it is revealed that Bette's father Melvin is dying from advanced prostate cancer, and is refusing treatment. A distraught Bette brings him home to die, so that he will not be trapped in a hospital, but this difficult experience leads her to reach out to Tina. Tina, who by now feels trapped by her relationship with Helena, grows closer to Bette again, and although Melvin never really blesses his daughter's homosexual relationship, he does once refer to Tina as 'Tina' rather than 'Miss Kennard' before he dies. His death is a great blow to Bette, who receives news of the loss of her job at Melvin's funeral.

Though upset and furious, Bette continues to derive comfort from her improved relationship with Tina. Bette's relationship with Kit is also vastly improved during this season, with Kit being her main source of comfort at the beginning of the season. She helps Kit to take over The Planet cafe, and begins actively involving herself in Kit's life. Eventually Tina chooses Bette over Helena, and the end of the season shows Tina asking to move back in with Bette. Tina's labor is surprisingly difficult, but their daughter Angelica is eventually born, and the end of the season shows Bette as calm and happy in her new family.

==== Season three ====
Six months later, Bette and Tina are feeling the stress of raising Angelica, Bette's unemployment and Tina going back to work for Helena at her film studio. Their relationship experiences difficulties yet again when Tina claims to have a renewed interest in men. Angry and hurt with her belief that Tina was merely experimenting with her for eight years, Bette has her move out. Bette briefly becomes a Buddhist and goes on a silent retreat, but leaves it. In the meantime, Tina begins a relationship with a divorced father, Henry Young. When Henry's son Mikey innocently asks Bette to take a "family picture" of himself and Henry with Tina and Angelica, and Tina tells Bette to her face that she no longer wants Bette to adopt Angelica and that she and Henry are going to start a family with the implication that Henry will adopt Angelica, Bette comes to the realization that Tina is only using Henry and Mikey so that she will get full custody of Angelica when she and Bette separate, as she is Angelica's biological mother and deliberately ingratiating herself in what Bette calls the "safety of a white heterosexual family", after which she will leave Henry. Desperate not to lose Angelica, Bette hires Joyce Wishnea, a gay civil rights lawyer, in order to file for sole custody, and warns Tina to stop her farce with Henry. This time, most of their friends rally behind Bette, seeing Tina as a traitor to the LGBTQ community for using her sexuality and the country's homophobic legal system against Bette. Tina, however, stands her ground and considers the possibility of losing all of her friends as the "bravest thing she has ever done".

At Shane and Carmen's wedding, Bette begins to have second thoughts about this, but when Tina gets Joyce's letter and begins to take action to separate Bette from Angelica forever, Bette kidnaps Angelica and runs away.

==== Season four ====
After being implored by her friends, Bette returns with Angelica. Tina does not press charges and Joyce does not report Bette's actions to the police. Joyce persuades Bette and Tina to reach an agreement themselves on the basis that the court will most likely put Angelica up for adoption or into a heterosexual foster family instead of granting either of them custody. Soon after, Bette becomes the dean of art at a university. Her sexually frustrated boss, Phyllis Kroll, confesses to her that she is a lesbian, despite having a husband, Leonard. Later on, Bette introduces Phyllis to her group of friends, aware that she will end up having sex with one of them; Phyllis meets and has an affair with Alice, but despite being old enough to be her mother, she falls madly in love with her, which makes Bette feel uncomfortable, particularly when Alice refuses to commit to Phyllis and Bette gets caught in the middle. In desperation, Bette puts Phyllis in contact with Joyce to help her divorce Leonard, aware of Joyce's reputation for sleeping with her clients. Her plan works and Phyllis and Joyce begin a relationship, though Joyce is forced to recuse herself from representing Phyllis when it becomes more serious.

While working at the California University School of the Arts as a dean, Bette has an affair with one of her graduate students, Nadia, but soon breaks off the relationship because she realizes it is inappropriate. Then, she begins a sexual relationship with Jodi Lerner, a sculptor who has begun lecturing at the university. Tina and Bette's relationship initially goes through some rough patches, but they gradually become friendlier with each other. Tina confesses to Bette that she still loves her and that she misses her life as a lesbian; when she meets Jodi, Tina realizes how much she wants Bette back and begins to regret ending her relationship with Bette.

Tina learns of an affair between Angus (Kit's boyfriend) and Tina's nanny, Hazel, and she informs Bette. This causes major stress to their relationship, as Bette wants to keep this information from her sister and Tina disagrees. Things become even more complicated after a disastrous dinner party, thrown by Bette for Jodi, where she learns Kit—a recovering alcoholic—is drinking again to deal with Angus's infidelity. Because of Bette's reaction to her sister's drinking, Bette and Jodi get into a heated argument. As a result of the argument, Jodi realizes that Bette's controlling ways are too much for her and takes a job offer in New York City. In the season finale, Bette, with some encouragement from Tina and help from Alice and Shane, steals a "17 Reasons Why" sign from an old building in hopes of getting Jodi back, as Jodi had once told her that she believed it would make a great art piece. She shows it to Jodi, who is touched enough that she decides to remain in Los Angeles with Bette, who is unaware that Tina is secretly planning to sabotage their relationship in hopes of getting her back.

==== Season five ====
At the beginning of the fifth season, Bette and Jodi's relationship seems very loving to their friends. However, it does not take long before problems begin to show. When Jodi insists on bringing Bette on her annual vacation with her close friends, Bette finds herself annoyed and upset with Jodi and her friend's activities.

Though Bette continues her relationship with Jodi, she begins to long for the life she shared with Tina, particularly after Tina starts to manipulate Bette by talking about their past life and bragging about her affairs with other women. Bette soon succumbs to Tina's hints and they begin an affair, though they both claim to be unsure if they want anything more than their sexual reconnection. To manipulate Bette further out of sadness and longing, Tina begins a flirtation with Sam, a woman who works on the set of Lez Girls. Due to her own jealousy, Bette becomes angry with Jodi when Jodi decides to have a dinner party and invites Tina and Sam. When Jodi confronts Bette about their distance emotionally and sexually, Bette cannot bring herself to admit that she is still in love with Tina. During rolling blackouts, Bette and Tina are trapped in an elevator on the way to their couples therapy session. During their time in the elevator, Bette and Tina discuss their fears about their relationship and end up making love, during which Bette tells Tina she still loves her, even though Tina was once prepared to destroy their relationship for good through Henry. Bette also reveals to Tina she wants to tell Jodi about their reunion after the Subaru Pink Ride.

Meanwhile, Jodi sees Bette is moody and upset about something but is not sure. By this time, Jodi has resigned from California University after one of her students held a realistic-looking gun made of soapstone to his head in front of the class as a form of art. While on their Subaru Pink Ride, Jodi learns of the affair during a game of 'I Never' when Alice drunkenly begins calling Bette a "giant and 'gi-normous' cheater" for having cheated on Tina and on Alice herself when they were dating. This statement leads Jodi to jokingly ask if Bette is cheating on her. When Bette does not respond and Tina gets up and runs away from the group, Jodi finally realizes that Bette is cheating on her and most likely never truly loved her from the start. In private, Kit verbally blasts Bette for her actions, reminding her of Tina's callous behavior while she was with Henry, but Bette confesses that, even though Tina was ready to take their daughter away from her and destroy their family forever, she loves and has always loved Tina, and that she and Jodi "never had a shot", effectively confirming that she was merely using Jodi sexually and never loved her.

After the truth is revealed, Jodi returns to Bette and completely brushes off Tina. Bette takes Jodi to her house trying to talk things over but Jodi is adamant to get Bette back anyhow, leading to force her to have sex with her. Bette finally pushes her away and they agree to clarify things in Bette's office. It is here that Bette tells Jodi that their relationship will not work because Tina is her true love. Jodi concedes and leaves without further fight. She retrieves her personal items from Bette's place and leaves Bette an early birthday present. At the end of that eventful day, Bette joins Tina and takes both Angelica and Tina back home.

With her real admiration for Jodi, Bette introduces Jodi at the public exhibition of a new Jodi Lerner piece, entitled "Core". However, it instead turns out to be Jodi's spiteful revenge against Bette for using her: a series of videos of a single Bette saying "I love you", as well as things like "Leave me alone", "Go without me", "Stop", and "Fuck me", ridiculing Bette for her promiscuity and willingness to use anyone sexually. After the shocking public humiliation, Bette returns to find solace in Tina. Later, Bette and Tina go to Lez Girls wrap party where their reunion and display of affection is admired by their friends, who are indifferent to the pain and heartbreak that they have both inflicted on Jodi.

==== Season six ====
Tina moves back in with Bette, and they decide to adopt a second child. In preparation, they begin to add an expensive extension to their house.

The pair finally meet the birth mother, Marci, in Nevada. She is an underprivileged Caucasian woman expecting a half African-American son. Despite the fact that Marci's family reject the notion of giving the child to a lesbian couple, Marci agrees to give Tina and Bette her child. However, this transaction is threatened when Joyce Wischnia informs the pair that Nevada law does not permit adoption to same sex couples. A solution is reached when Bette and Tina agree to board Marci during her pregnancy, but when they arrive to the Los Angeles bus station to meet her, Marci is not on the bus, having backed out of the deal.

Meanwhile, as tension continues between Bette and Jodi due to Bette's infidelity, Bette tries to have Jodi fired and the matter is brought before Phyllis. Jodi refuses to resign and threatens legal action against Bette and the university should anyone fire her. Phyllis privately tries to convince Bette that Bette should resign instead, since she had already helped cover up a potential scandal involving Bette's brief fling with Nadia, and that any potential sexual harassment proceedings from Jodi would further endanger the university's reputation. Immediately afterwards, Phyllis makes a drunken pass at Bette at a bar, claiming she was always strongly attracted to her and can now pursue a relationship with her since Bette is no longer her employee, even if it means leaving Joyce. Finally fed up with Phyllis' sexual confusion and desperation, Bette rejects her advances and submits her resignation from the university.

Bette later reconnects with her bisexual college crush Kelly Wentworth (Elizabeth Berkley), and the pair open an art gallery together. While Bette had strong feelings for Kelly in college to the point where she was on the brink of suicide when Kelly rejected her, she now seems quite capable of remaining committed to Tina despite the newly divorced Kelly's constant flirtations with her. Tina, however, subtly voices her lack of trust in Bette, especially after Kelly claims that Bette was a "player" during their college days, and starts to fear that Bette will eventually cheat on her again. When a drunken Kelly finally makes a pass at Bette in Bette's house, Bette soundly rejects her, but the pair remain on friendly terms. Then Kelly accidentally breaks a glass, and Bette helps her pick up the shards. Jenny mistakes this activity for a sexual moment between the pair, and captures it on her cellphone camera. Later, an angry Jenny threatens Bette that she will expose the footage to Tina if Bette does not first confess her "umpteenth indiscretion" to Tina.

When Tina gets a job offer in New York, she and Bette decide to relocate there and start a new life. Bette is more than happy to do this, partially to escape from the claustrophobic bubble of Los Angeles lesbian intrigue and partially to escape Jenny. She confides all of this to Kit, including Jenny's misconception. While in bed, Bette proposes to Tina, who accepts.

At Bette and Tina's going away party in their home, Kit threatens Jenny to back off and is in turn shown the incriminating cellphone footage. Kit next confronts Bette, believing the footage to be a valid display of infidelity. Learning about the footage, and knowing that both of their previous affairs with Candace, Jodi and Henry will very easily convince Tina (who by now no longer trusts Bette fully) that she has cheated on her again, Bette finally approaches Jenny and threatens to kill her if she destroys what little stability remains of her family. This confrontation is held near a banister with an unfinished railing, and it is the last time Jenny is shown alive. Her body is discovered in the pool shortly afterwards. The series ends with Bette and all her friends being interrogated by police, and the truth of Jenny's death unexplained.

==== The Interrogation Tapes ====
Several weeks after the television series ends, footage of Bette's police interrogation appears on Showtime's L Word website ("The Interrogation Tapes"). For some reason, this footage leaked onto YouTube first. Although she does not divulge any information regarding Jenny's death, Bette confesses to being secretly angry and devastated by the fact that Tina never asked her to carry their second child, though it is left unrevealed why Bette herself did not suggest in it the first place.

=== The L Word: Generation Q ===
==== Season one ====
Ten years after Jenny's death, Bette is running for Mayor of Los Angeles. It is revealed that during the last ten years, Bette and Tina did get married, but also got divorced after Tina left Bette for another woman, Carrie, with Bette getting at least partial custody of Angelica, who now lives with her. Bette refuses campaign funding from Dani Nùñez, a PR executive for her father's company which invests in opioids, but Dani has a change of heart and resigns in order to work for Bette. Also seeking to sabotage Bette's campaign is Tyler Adams, as Bette once slept with his closeted lesbian ex-wife, Felicity. In response, Bette goes on Alice's new television show to tell her side of the story and arranges an interview with Felicity, with whom she renews her affair. On Dani's advice, Bette breaks up with Felicity to avoid further controversy, and in retaliation, Felicity tips Tyler and the press off about their renewed affair, putting her campaign in jeopardy once again when Tyler confronts her and Bette is forced to punch him to protect Angelica. Bette finally reveals to the press that her reason for running for mayor is that Kit died of an opioid overdose, and enrolls Angelica in a public school when she is suspended by her racist and homophobic private school for physically defending Bette against a classmate, winning her a grant from the teachers' union. At the same time, Tina visits Bette and Angelica to offer her support. Despite their troubled past, Bette hopes to renew her relationship with Tina, but Tina privately reveals to Bette that she is marrying Carrie and they moving to Los Angeles so that they can be closer to Angelica. Ultimately, Bette loses the election to her far-right conservative rival, Jeff Milner, who had aired several campaign commercials which denounced Bette's moral values. Bette goes to grieve for Kit with Angelica where her ashes were scattered. In the process, she runs into Maya, a lesbian reporter who was covering her campaign, and accepts a dinner invitation from her.

==== Season two ====
In season two, still single, Bette finds herself struggling to come to terms with Tina and Carrie's engagement, and is only barely able to hide her hatred for Carrie, while Angie begins to express interest in learning more about Marcus Allenwood, her donor. Bette expresses her fear of growing old and dying alone to Alice and Shane, who set her up on a date with Golnar "Gigi" Ghorbani, the ex-wife of Alice's domestic partner. During the date, Bette appears despondent, especially when Tina and Carrie appear at the same restaurant by chance. Bette and Gigi kiss in an attempt to spite Tina, but she does not even look over at them. Gigi, however, reveals that she and Bette share a lot in common, as they are both divorced women who thought their wives would have chosen to return to them, leading them to enter a relationship, though Bette sees Gigi more as an occasional hookup than a girlfriend. Against Bette's wishes, Angie does a genealogy test and discovers that she has a half-sister, Kayla Allenwood. Though initially angry, Bette agrees to let Angie meet Kayla. Meanwhile, Bette is offered a position as the managing director at the art gallery of Isaac Zakarian. Despite her dislike for Zakarian's conservative and racist beliefs, Bette agrees to work for him so that she can recruit and help lesser-known artists. She successfully tracks down Pippa Pascal, a famous African-American lesbian artist who was forced into seclusion, and tries to persuade her to work with her, but she turns Bette down. Angie eventually confides to Bette that she has learned that Marcus is dying, and wants to see a therapist with her, Tina and Carrie. At the therapy session with Micah Lee, Angie reveals that Marcus is dying from kidney failure and wants to see if she is a suitable donor. Despite Micah's pleas, Bette immediately flies into a rage and begins speaking over Tina and rudely dismissing Carrie to the point that Angie openly accuses Bette of only caring about her own feelings and storms out. At Micah's urging, Bette confesses that she barely knew her own mother after she abandoned the family, but when she tracked her down, she instantly regretted it. After the session, Bette contacts Gigi for sex, who turns her down, tired of being at Bette's beck and call. Later on, after speaking with Tina, Bette apologises to Angie for her actions and gives her blessing for Angie to meet Marcus. Bette later crosses paths with Pippa again and invites her to a poker game at Dana's, where she runs into Carrie, who Bette had reluctantly invited since Tina was away. At the party, Bette is approached by Carrie, who proposes that they try to be more civil to each other for Tina and Angie's sakes. Though both share stories of being marginalized in school for their homosexuality and appearance, Bette rudely rebuffs Carrie and goes with Pippa to her house where they enter a sexual relationship. Their relationship is briefly strained when Bette realizes that the Nùñez family are representing Pippa's exhibition and bluffs that she will have Pippa's art removed, angering Pippa, who believes Bette used her for self-gain, but when the CAC take Bette's threat seriously, Bette gives in and stands up for Pippa. The two reconcile and instead start protests against the Nùñez corporation, demanding that their name be removed from the exhibition, and they eventually win. Bette and Tina later take Angie to meet Marcus in the hospital, but he turns Angie away. After seeing Angie's devastation to the point that she snaps at Jordi during the pre-prom party, Bette and Tina visit Marcus, who briefly reads a list of questions Angie had for him, and agrees to meet her. Tina confronts Bette for her treatment towards Carrie and asks if she is still in love with her, but Marcus dies of cardiac arrest before Bette can answer. Pippa begins to show doubts in Bette's sincerity about their relationship with regards to Tina, despite Bette insisting that they are over. While shopping with Shane and Alice for wedding gifts for Tina, Shane goes behind Carrie's back and reveals to Bette that her actions have caused Carrie to have second thoughts about marrying Tina, and encourages her to take the chance to steal Tina back. At a celebration for Alice's new book, Bette attempts to talk to Tina, and though Tina denies that she is in love with Bette, Carrie overhears them and confronts them both, accusing Bette of trying to sabotage their marriage and Tina of not caring for her enough to stand up to Bette, and subsequently calls off the engagement over Tina's objections. Tina furiously accuses Bette of sabotaging the engagement, which Pippa witnesses. At home that night, Bette shows Angie a painting that Marcus had made for her, and her intention to do an exhibition of Marcus's work at the CAC after Pippa's. With some encouragement from Angie, Bette decides to go to the exhibition with Pippa and make amends, but as she is leaving the house, she finds Tina standing at her door, who asks if she can come in.

==== Season three ====
Tina again asks Bette if she is in love with her, and Bette finally admits that she is, though she promises to try to make things better between her and Carrie, but Tina also admits that she cannot marry Carrie because she is still in love with Bette. Nevertheless, she accuses Bette of being incapable of loving her properly and storms out.

A year later, Bette has since gone on another Buddhist retreat, which she completed, and has repaired her friendship with Tina. At an auction, Bette decides to sell one of her old paintings from her old house with Tina, but Tina buys it, admitting that she did not want to let go of it. That night, Bette invites Tina to her home and admits that on her retreat, she came to terms with her mother abandoning her and learned to love again. She and Tina end up making love. A few nights later, Bette meets up with Tina again at an exhibition for Marcus's work, and the two recreate their first meeting. Bette asks Tina not to return to Canada and stay with her, but Tina becomes angry and accuses Bette of demanding that she once again sacrifice her home and career for her and storms out to the airport for her flight home. Determimed not to lose Tina again, Bette heeds Shane and Alice's advice to leave Los Angeles and pursue Tina to Canada. They give chase in Angie's car, and are stalled in traffic due to Gigi having had an accident on her way to meet Dani. Bette runs to Tina's car and begs her to take her back, claiming that she has spent a lot of time building her career, but that she loves Tina more and now wants to spend the rest of her time building a life with her. Though reluctant at first, Tina finally gives in and tells Bette to come with her. At the end of the season, Bette and Tina arrive in Los Angeles and decide to remarry.

== Reception ==
Initially, Bette's character and story were well-received, and she was ranked No. 10 in AfterEllen.com's Top 50 Favorite Female TV Characters.

=== Controversy ===
In retrospect, viewers of both the original series and Generation Q have become more polarized over Bette's character, as well as her relationship with Tina, which fans have dubbed "TiBette". The sex scene between Bette and Tina in the season one finale of the original series has come under criticism by some viewers who interpreted it as depicting Bette raping Tina, given that Tina physically resisted before submitting. Ilene Chaiken was criticized for her depiction of domestic violence and rape between lesbians, and so were fans of the series for downplaying it as "angry sex" or "break-up sex". In an interview, Jennifer Beals cited the scene as her favorite in the entire series, and praised both Chaiken and Tony Goldwyn for their work in writing and directing the scene, respectively.

In 2015, Meg Ten Eyck criticized Bette's characterization on EveryQueer, citing that while Bette was depicted as the main breadwinner in the family with an education, a successful career and the one who did not carry Angelica, she refused to properly acknowledge Tina as an equal partner, repeatedly cheated on her and verbally and emotionally abused her whenever she questioned her power and authority. Ten Eyck also opined that Bette only used her position as a person of color for her own benefit, and was rarely held accountable for her actions by her friends while Tina was often ostracized from the group for similar reasons. Ten Eyck concluded that Bette was essentially written as the "man" in the relationship, comparing it to "masculinity and double standards", and used her gender and sexuality to get away with her bad behavior, and inspired fans of the series to behave the same way, while Tina was repeatedly written as "second fiddle" to Bette and never allowed to develop in her own way. Similar comments were made in 2021 following the second season of Generation Q, in which Tina had divorced Bette and was engaged to a butch woman, Carrie Walsh, but Bette's jealousy and abusive behavior towards both Tina and Carrie, to the point that Bette was visibly angry with Angie for choosing to wear Carrie's cufflinks instead of hers (often categorized as signs of emotional insecurity and narcissistic personality disorder), led to the engagement ending, and fans of the series were filmed celebrating after the finale's cliffhanger ending which teased Tina going back to Bette for the third time despite Bette's behavior, with the hashtag #TiBetteIsEndgame trending on social media. The Los Angeles Times condemned showrunner Marja-Lewis Ryan for what was perceived as her unfair and superficial depiction of the dynamic between femme and butch lesbians by prioritizing outer beauty over inner beauty. Fans of Bette and Tina were widely criticized for fat shaming and cyberbullying Rosie O'Donnell after she was cast as Carrie. Showbiz Cheat Sheat cited numerous fans who expressed that they had grown tired of what they saw as the series glamorizing Bette and Tina's repetitive, immature and toxic storylines and the show constantly depicting Tina as nothing more than a "grand prize" that Bette needed to win, a trope that had often been labelled by feminists as glorifying toxic masculinity when concerning heterosexual couples. In 2021, Melissa Girimonte of Slice placed Bette and Tina number 15 out of 21 on a list of the most romanticized toxic fictional couples ever, comparing them to heterosexual couples such as Ross Geller and Rachel Green, Belle and Beast, Edward Cullen and Bella Swan, and the Joker and Harley Quinn.

The cancellation of Generation Q following the third season has also been attributed by some fans to Bette and Tina's storyline, as some cited their third reconciliation and second marriage as forced fanservice with lazy writing, such as recreating their first meeting and copying elements from Imagine Me & You (Bette chasing Tina in her car on the road on foot), The Parent Trap (Bette sabotaging Tina's engagement in order to win her back with Shane and Alice playing the role of the twin girls), High Noon (Bette and Tina walking off together into the sunset in the final scene similar to Gary Cooper and Grace Kelly) and Star Wars: The Rise of Skywalker (Tina forgiving Bette again for her abusive behavior and then marrying her for the second time over an unseen one year time skip with no explanation given, similar to Palpatine's infamous offscreen, unexplained return). Their limited screen time of four out of ten episodes was also negatively received, as was their second wedding, with fans noting that the event appeared to focus more on the supporting cast (notably Shane and Tess) than Bette and Tina themselves.
