= Shane McCutcheon =

- The L Word character
- Portrayed by: Katherine Moennig
- Duration: 2004–09, 2019–23
- First appearance: January 18, 2004
- Created by: Ilene Chaiken
In-universe information
- Occupation: Hairdresser; Model
- Father: Gabriel McCutcheon
- Half-brothers: Shay McCutcheon

Shane McCutcheon is a fictional character from the American Showtime television drama series The L Word, and the sequel series The L Word: Generation Q, played by Katherine Moennig.

== Development ==
Shane was originally billed to Moennig as "sexy" and "androgynous". Moennig told Michelle Kort from The Advocate that she had learned "a lot" from playing Shane. She has elements of realism because "life imitates art and art imitates life". The actress further explained that she related to certain aspects of Shane's storylines because she had previously experienced them. Moennig did not agree with labeling the character butch. Fellow cast member Leisha Hailey (who plays Alice Pieszecki) also disagreed and believed that Shane was more androgynous.

During season four Shane became the guardian of her brother Shay McCutcheon (Aidan Jarrar). Moennig told Karman Kregloe from AfterEllen.com that Shane would return to her "wild ways" after producers decided that the storyline did not suit. Moennig compared Shane during season five to Where’s Waldo because "she’s popping up everywhere and she’s just out to have a good time."

Ahead of the series debut in December 2003, a reporter from the PR Newswire wrote that Tammy Lynn Michaels had been cast as Shane's "jilted lover" Lacey, who proceeds to stalk her. Rosanna Arquette had signed up to play Cherie Jaffe, the wife of a studio head Steve Jaffe (James Purcell) who arrives as Shane's new client. The writer revealed that Shane would change "more than her haircut". Shane and Cherie's relationship was Moennig's favourite to work on and she attributed successful scenes to Arquette's acting techniques. Moennig believed that the relationship was so "fucked up" and it was fun to portray because it was also dysfunctional.

Moennig said that during the second season Shane would attract a character with "a grounded sense of self, plus a lot of girlish insecurities". She explained "you're always attracted to someone you want to learn from". Erin Daniels who plays Dana Fairbanks added that "you see Shane struggle with actually having feelings, which really scares her". The character was revealed as Carmen de la Pica Morales (Sarah Shahi). Carmen easily becoming a fan favorite of Shane's girlfriends. The show's producer and writer Angela Robinson was quoted by The Advocate she believed Moennig and Sarah Shahi had "amazing chemistry". Series creator Ilene Chaiken added that Kate and Sarah were "hot together."

In season four, Shane begins a relationship with Paige Sobel (Kristanna Loken). They meet after Shane's brother, Shay, makes friends with her son, Jared Sobel (Jackson Allan). Loken told The Advocate's Kort that Paige "hits" on Shane at a PTA meeting and "there it starts". Her character has been emotionally hurt by men she sees Shane as "a little wounded as well, and I think she likes that sensitivity about her, that vulnerability." Paige "comes on strong" and has confidence because she previously slept with woman. But she never had a same-sex relationship and sees Shane and thinks "I'm just going to go for it and see what happens." Through their relationship the series portrayed a storyline in which Paige tells her young son that she is in a lesbian relationship with Shane. Loken said that she was able to draw inspiration from her own childhood experiences with the issue.

Loken said that Moennig had never worked with an actress who was taller than she was in sex scenes. She joked that they were unsure of who should be "on top" during the scenes.

A friendship storyline developed for Shane and Jenny Schecter (Mia Kirshner). Mia Kirshner wanted their relationship to become romantic. Moennig believed that the friendship was sweet and humanized them both. She added that "it was one of the few times where a type of relationship really took its time to grow."

Despite Shane initially being labelled as androgynous rather than butch, a sex scene between Shane and Paige in season four showed a fantasy in which they were depicted as a 1950s butch and femme couple, respectively, and in The L Word: Generation Q, she is referred to as "Uncle Shane" by Angelica Porter-Kennard.

== Storylines ==
=== The L Word ===
In season one, Shane's ex-girlfriend Lacey begins harassing her. She is angry because Shane would not commit to a relationship. Lacey puts up posters and hands out flyers to locals to expose Shane's promiscuity. Shane confronts Lacey and accuses her of being scared of being on her own. Instead of going to the police, Shane convinces Lacey to stop the harassment by sleeping with her one last time. Following that pseudo-fiasco, Shane lets her old friend Clive (Matthew Currie Holmes) move in with her. She used to work alongside Clive as a male prostitute. Shane works at a salon called Lather. Through Clive she meets Harry Samchuck (Colin Cunningham), who sends his Hollywood friend to have her hair cut by Shane. This gives her the opportunity to network and secure important and high-paying Hollywood clients. Unfortunately, Shane is forced to throw Clive out of her home when he steals items and money in order to pay for drugs. Shane begins an affair with her client Cherie, a lesbian gold digger who has a family. Cherie convinces her wealthy husband Steve to invest in Shane's salon. Steve begins to suspect that Shane is sleeping with his daughter, Clea Jaffe (Samantha McLeod). However, Clea is in love with Shane and exposes her mother's affair with Shane. Believing that Shane seduced and turned both his wife and his daughter gay, Steve threatens to murder Shane if she ever comes near his family again. Shane tells Cherie that she loves her, but she refuses to leave her rich lifestyle.

Shane moves in with Jenny and Mark Wayland (Eric Lively). Arianna Huffington hires Shane to cut her hair and so Shane is introduced to her production assistant Carmen, who is also a lesbian. After sex, Shane says she is not interested in relationships, but Carmen pursues her believing otherwise. They discover that Mark has been taping their sex lives for a lesbian documentary. Hollywood producer Veronica Bloom (Camryn Manheim) hires Shane and gets her to manipulate potential clients because Shane is naturally good at talking to people. Shane convinces a woman to sign the rights to her life story to Veronica. Shane quits when she unhappy with her actions. Carmen begins a relationship with Jenny, though the entire thing is merely to make Shane jealous, which Jenny soon discovers, prompting her to break up with Carmen. At the same time, Shane is still afraid to commit to a relationship after what she went through with Cherie. However, Shane eventually gets together with Carmen and confesses her love.

Carmen introduces Shane to her family, but pretends that they are friends. The family grows fond of Shane and attempts to set her up on a date. This prompts Carmen to come out, but her homophobic family, particularly her mother, reject her and cease contact. Shane is hired at Wax, a skateboarding shop with a hair salon. Cherie visits Shane and tells her that she has divorced Steve, gaining a large portion of his fortune, and is still interested in her. Carmen performs a DJ set at Wax and Def Jam watch her performance. Shane notices Carmen flirting with their employees and reacts by sleeping with Cherie. Carmen confronts Shane, who tells her that she finds monogamy hard to live with. Shane stops showing an interest in sex, Carmen then accuses her of punishing her. She then tells Shane that she has cheated on her in revenge. Shane grieves for her friend Dana Fairbanks (Erin Daniels) and asks Carmen to marry her, who later accepts. Shane finds her father, Gabriel McCutcheon (Eric Roberts) and discovers that she has a half-brother, Shay. Helena Peabody (Rachel Shelley) finances the wedding and they travel to Whistler, British Columbia, where same-sex marriage is legal. When she notices Gabriel cheating on his wife Carla (Sarah-Jane Redmond), Shane realises that she may do the same to Carmen and jilts her. Heartbroken, Carmen leaves Shane for good. Shane later attempts to make amends with Carmen, but she is forcibly escorted off the premises by Carmen's cousins, who tell her Carmen never wants to see her again.

Shane does a drug binge with Cherie, and Carla abandons Shane's half-brother, Shay. Shane does not want to be responsible for Shay, but lets him stay because she does not want him to have a life in foster care like she did. Shane starts modelling underwear for Hugo Boss to pay medical bills for Shay's broken arm. He makes friends with Jared. Shane becomes close to Jared's mother, Paige, and after numerous failed attempts, they have sex. Gabriel returns to take Shay home. Realizing she will not win custody of Shay, Shane is forced to let him leave. Shane and Paige go in search of a new home to share, but for no apparent reason, Shane has sex with their realtor while looking at a house. Paige tells Shane she is fine with Shane sleeping around, but Shane, ashamed of her actions, tells Paige that she is not in love with her and ends their relationship. Wax is later set on fire. Though visibly shocked, Shane does not file a police report, and Paige and Jared disappear shortly afterwards. It is initially assumed that Paige was responsible out of revenge, but Shane later claims that she burned Wax down herself; it is left unrevealed if this was the truth, or if Paige was the culprit but Shane lied in order to protect her from potentially going to prison and leaving Jared motherless.

Shane later has sex with a mother and her two daughters separately on one of the daughters' wedding day. The fall out causes Shane to abstain from sex. However, she ends up not being able to abstain for long, and has a threesome with Dawn Denbo (Elizabeth Keener) and her oppressed lover Cindi (Alicia Leigh Willis), the owners of the newest lesbian club Shebar. When she sleeps with Cindi without Denbo's permission, Denbo sets out for revenge. Denbo tells Shane and her friends that she will ruin their lives. She starts a turf war between Shebar and The Planet. Molly Kroll (Clementine Ford) develops an attraction to Shane and they sleep together. Her mother Phyllis Kroll (Cybill Shepherd) talks to Molly about Shane, and Molly refers to Shane as "uneducated", "easy" and not smart. Shane overhears their conversation, so Molly tries to convince Shane that she loves her. They attempt to make their relationship work, but Phyllis' intervention puts an end to it (ironically, Phyllis herself had persuaded Molly to spend time with lesbians in the hopes that she herself would become a lesbian and understand her mother's own homosexuality).

When Jenny breaks up with Niki Stevens (Kate French), Shane has sex with Niki on a balcony and Jenny interrupts them. Molly gives Jenny a letter addressed to Shane, but Jenny hides it. Shane makes a series of gestures to earn Jenny's forgiveness to no avail. Jenny tells Shane that it was she who broke her heart, not Niki, because of their long friendship. She reveals that she's in love with Shane. Jenny and Shane enter a relationship which Alice discovers and reveals to their friends. Jenny's behavior becomes more erratic than usual and this alienates her friends against her. Shane ignores her friends' pleas for her to dump Jenny because she feels an obligation to Jenny. Shane starts sleeping with Niki. Jenny tells her she does not care, but makes her feel guilty about it. Shane has a chance meeting with Molly, who informs her about the letter she gave Jenny. Shane finds the letter in Jenny's attic along with many of other objects taken from their friends, prompting her to decide to end her relationship with Jenny. At Bette and Tina's party, Jenny is found dead in the pool, having committed suicide.

=== Interrogation tapes ===
Following Jenny's death, each of the characters are interrogated by the police for their individual motives for murdering Jenny. Though Shane is unable to divulge any information, she confesses that she burned down Wax herself, not Paige.

As the tapes were initially intended for Alice to be wrongfully convicted of murder and serve as the basis for a cancelled women in prison-like series titled The Farm starring Alice and a new cast of characters, the canonicity of the tapes' content is now uncertain with the production of The L Word: Generation Q, leaving it unknown if it was Shane or Paige who burned Wax down.

=== The L Word: Generation Q ===
Over ten years after Jenny's death, Shane moves to Los Angeles, where she is reunited with Bette and Alice. It is revealed in dialogue that she previously opened but sold hair salons in Paris and New York, and has bought a house in Los Angeles. She is also married to Quiara, but they are estranged. On Bette and Alice's insistence, Shane allows Sarah Finley, one of Alice's employees, to help assemble her new furniture. Finley does not charge Shane for the favour, and in return, Shane allows Finley to move in with her. After Bette's mayoral candidacy is threatened by one of her previous sex scandals, Shane gives Bette her support, and is initially against Bette appearing on Alice's talk show to explain her side of the story and win back the people's faith, but relents. In the process, Shane has a one-night stand with the flight attendant from her plane to Los Angeles. Later, after ignoring most of Quiara's messages, Shane is finally sent divorce papers. In her depression, she goes to a bar run by lesbian lovers, Lena and Tess. She buys it and turns it into a local gay bar, "Dana's", putting Tess and Lena in charge. Shane begins a romantic relationship with Lena, meaning Lena is cheating on Tess. When Tess finds out, she break up with Lena and is angry at Shane for cheating with her former girlfriend. Shane finally answers a text message from Quiara, her estranged wife. Shane later celebrates her 40th birthday but does not seem enthusiastic, especially when she finally signs the divorce papers. At the birthday party, however, Quiara attends, to Shane's shock. Though Quiara is aware that Shane has signed, she tells Shane that she is pregnant, and still wants to be with Shane even if it means that she will have sole responsibility of bringing up the child. Along with their friends, Shane attends Angelica's school play and notices that Angelica appears to have a crush on her friend, Jordi. She subsequently gives Angelica advice on how to admit her feelings, which results in Jordi returning them and the two of them sharing a kiss. Touched by the moment, Shane agrees to rekindle her relationship with Quiara, and kindly asks Finley to move out. Later on, Shane goes with Quiara to hear the baby's heartbeat for the first time, but Shane later claims that she felt no emotion whatsoever, which frightens her, though Quiara assures her that it will be fine. However, Quiara later suffers a miscarriage and loses the baby. Though devastated for Quiara, Shane expresses surprise when Quiara does not grieve and casually states that she will get inseminated again as soon as possible, leading Shane to realize that Quiara only got inseminated to get her to resume their relationship out of obligation and guilt. Shane's reaction leads Quiara to believe that Shane was relieved at the baby's death. Realizing that Shane will never truly accept parenthood, Quiara leaves Shane for good and returns her wedding ring. In her depression, Shane adopts a homeless dog.

== Reception ==
The show's resident lothario, who gets so much tail her pals need a giant dry-erase board to keep track of her dalliances. Perhaps the show's most daring character, Shane is butch and genially unambitious and sleeps with any woman she wants. She's not mean, just on to the next one-nighter.

—The Advocate's Dennis Hensley describing Shane. (2004)

Shane was featured in AfterEllen's list of "Top 50 Favourite Female TV Characters". Their writer claimed that there was not a woman on earth who could resist the "charms of The L Word's resident Lothario". Stating further that Shane "like her iconic shag — could not be tamed and that's just how we liked her: wild and free". Fergus Shiel from The Age said that Moennig showed star potential and grew "more assured and engaging with each episode". He added that to "convolute matters sexually" is what Shane does best. While Gordon Farrer from the publication branded Shane a "highly sexed androgynous hairdresser". The Advocate's Kort said that Shane was the "show's classic stud woman". Kort had previously described her as a "rakish "fuck 'em and leave 'em" hairdresser, [who] proved to be the biggest dyke heartthrob of season 1." Charlie McCollum of The Charleston Gazette said Moennig gave a "particularly compelling performance" as the "predatory Shane who loves sex but hates commitment". Gail Shister from The Seattle Times opined that Shane was modeled on "Warren Beatty's libidinous hairdresser" from the film Shampoo and added that "doesn't do relationships".

Mary Foulk from About.com said that Shane and Cherie "sizzle"; adding that their intimate pool scene "almost makes you forgive the infidelity" against Carmen.
