= The L Word =

American-Canadian TV series (2004–2009)

- Genre: Drama
- Created by: Ilene Chaiken; Michele Abbott; Kathy Greenberg
- Starring: Jennifer Beals; Mia Kirshner; Pam Grier; Laurel Holloman; Katherine Moennig; Leisha Hailey; Erin Daniels; Karina Lombard; Eric Mabius; Sarah Shahi; Rachel Shelley; Eric Lively; Daniel Sea; Dallas Roberts; Janina Gavankar; Rose Rollins; Marlee Matlin
- Opening theme: "The L Word" performed by Betty (seasons 2–6)
- Composer: Elizabeth Ziff
- Countries of origin: United States; Canada
- Original language: English
- No. of seasons: 6
- No. of episodes: 71 (list of episodes)

Production
- Executive producers: Ilene Chaiken; Rose Lam; Steve Golin; Larry Kennar
- Producers: Rose Lam; Kim Steer; Elizabeth Ziff; Angela Robinson; Elizabeth Hunter; A.M. Homes
- Production locations: Vancouver, British Columbia; Los Angeles, California
- Running time: 50 minutes
- Production companies: Coast Mountain Films; Posse (season 1–2); Little Chicken Inc (season 3–6); MGM Television; Showtime Networks

Original release
- Network: Showtime
- Release: January 18, 2004 – March 8, 2009

Related
- The L Word: Generation Q

The L Word is a television drama series that aired on Showtime in the United States from January 18, 2004 to March 8, 2009. The series follows the lives of a group of lesbian and bisexual women who live in West Hollywood, California. The premise originated with Ilene Chaiken, Michele Abbott and Kathy Greenberg; Chaiken is credited as the primary creator of the series and also served as its executive producer.

The L Word featured television's first ensemble cast of lesbian and bisexual female characters, and its portrayal of lesbianism was groundbreaking at the time. One of the series' pioneering hallmarks was its explicit depiction of lesbian sex from the female gaze, at a time when lesbian sex was "virtually invisible elsewhere on television." It was also the first television series written and directed by predominantly queer women.

The L Word franchise led to the spin-off reality show The Real L Word (2010–2012) as well as the documentary film L Word Mississippi: Hate the Sin (2014), both of which aired on Showtime. A sequel television series, The L Word: Generation Q, debuted in December 2019 and was canceled after three seasons in 2023.

== Production ==
The L Word was co-created by Ilene Chaiken, Michele Abbott, and Kathy Greenberg; Chaiken served as the primary creator and executive director of the series, as well as a writer and director. Steve Golin and Larry Kennar served as additional executive producers, while Guinevere Turner, Susan Miller, Cherien Dabis, and Rose Troche were among the series' writers.

The series premiered on Showtime on January 18, 2004 and ran for a total of six seasons, airing its finale on March 8, 2009. The L Word was filmed in Vancouver, British Columbia at Coast Mountain Films Studio, as well as on location in Los Angeles, California.

== Series overview ==
=== Cast and characters ===
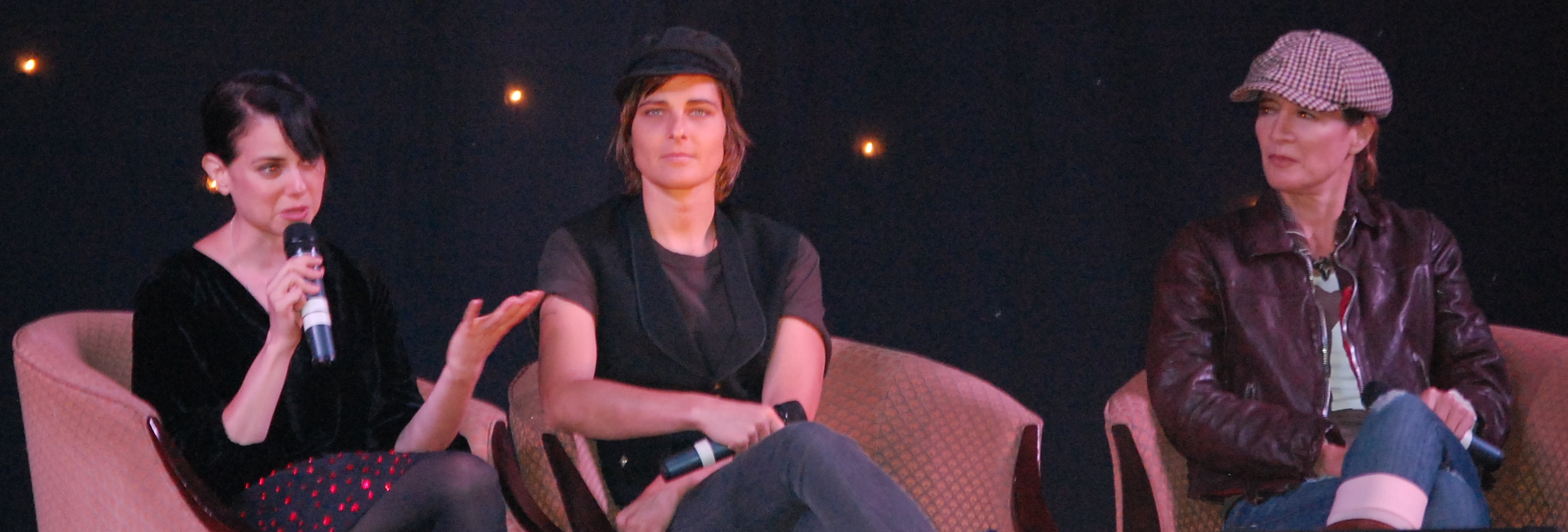
(Left to right) Mia Kirshner, Daniel Sea, and Anne Ramsay at L6, "The L Word" Fan Convention in 2009

| Actor/Actress | Character | Appearances | | | | | |
| Actor/Actress | Character | Season 1 | Season 2 | Season 3 | Season 4 | Season 5 | Season 6 |
|---|---|---|---|---|---|---|---|
| Jennifer Beals | Bette Porter | Main | Main | Main | Main | Main | Main |
| Mia Kirshner | Jenny Schecter | Main | Main | Main | Main | Main | Main |
| Pam Grier | Kit Porter | Main | Main | Main | Main | Main | Main |
| Laurel Holloman | Tina Kennard | Main | Main | Main | Main | Main | Main |
| Katherine Moennig | Shane McCutcheon | Main | Main | Main | Main | Main | Main |
| Leisha Hailey | Alice Pieszecki | Main | Main | Main | Main | Main | Main |
| Erin Daniels | Dana Fairbanks | Main | Main | Main | Guest | | |
| Karina Lombard | Marina Ferrer | Main | | | Guest | | Guest |
| Eric Mabius | Tim Haspel | Main | Guest | Guest | | | Guest |
| Sarah Shahi | Carmen de la Pica Morales | | Main | Main | | | Guest |
| Rachel Shelley | Helena Peabody | | Main | Main | Main | Main | Main |
| Eric Lively | Mark Wayland | | Main | | | | |
| Daniel Sea | Max Sweeney | | | Main | Main | Main | Main |
| Dallas Roberts | Angus Partridge | | | Main | Main | | Guest |
| Janina Gavankar | Eva "Papi" Torres | | | | Main | | Guest |
| Rose Rollins | Tasha Williams | | | | Main | Main | Main |
| Marlee Matlin | Jodi Lerner | | | | Main | Main | Main |

=== Title ===
Contemporary use of the phrase "the L word" as an alias for lesbian dates to at least the 1981 play My Blue Heaven by Jane Chambers, in which a character stammers out: "You're really...? The L-word? Lord God, I never met one before."

The original code-name for The L Word was Earthlings, a rarely used slang term for lesbians.

=== "The Chart" ===
"The Chart", an undirected labeled graph in which nodes represent individuals and lines represent affairs or hookups, is a recurring plot element throughout the series. Originally, The L Word was to be based around a lesbian, Kit Porter, and "The Chart" was tattooed on her back.

The idea for the chart was formed in The L Word's writers room. The creators of the show were discussing their own mutual friends and who had romantic entanglements with whom. This led to them creating a beta version of what the chart comes to be on a piece of paper. The writers eventually decide to incorporate this chart into the show.

In season 4, Alice launches The Chart as a social networking service. Concurrently, a real-world parallel project OurChart.com was created. The website, which allowed registered members to create their own profiles and hosted several blogs on the show, operated from the beginning of season four until the end of season six, after which the site was discontinued and redirected to Showtime's official website.

A small portion of The Chart, covering some of the relationships established throughout the series. Pink circles denote primary characters, purple circles denote supporting and minor characters, and grey circles denote characters who are only alluded to and never depicted.

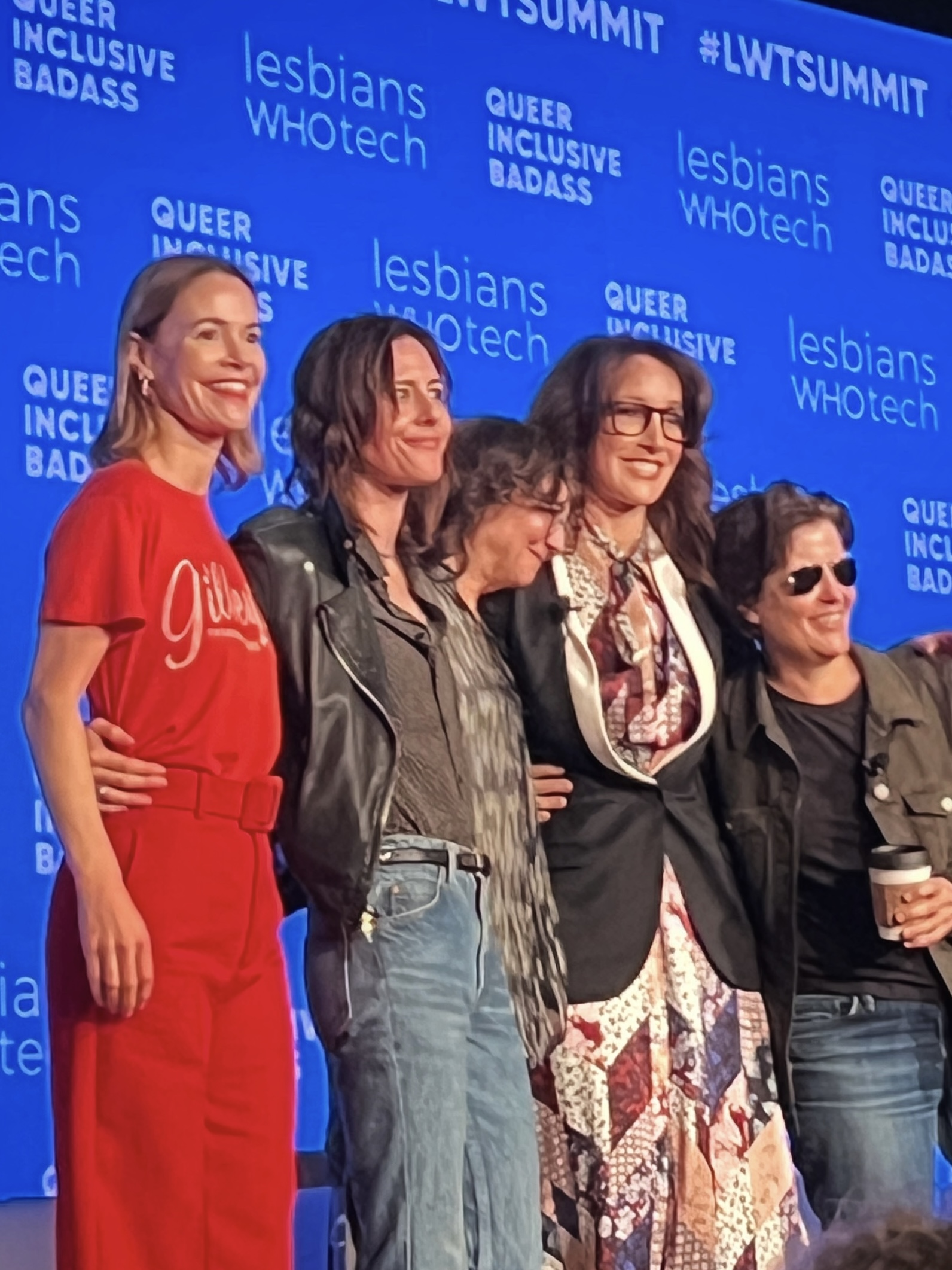
Leisha Hailey, Katherine Moennig, Ilene Chaikin, Jennifer Beals, and Kara Swisher at the Lesbians Who Tech & Allies Summit in October 2023

== Plot ==
=== Season 1 ===
The first season of The L Word premiered on January 18, 2004, and ended on April 11, 2004. The season introduces Bette Porter and Tina Kennard, a couple in a seven-year relationship attempting to have a child; Marina Ferrer, owner of the local cafe The Planet; Jenny Schecter, who has recently moved to Los Angeles to live with her boyfriend Tim Haspell; Shane McCutcheon, an androgynous, highly sexual hairstylist; Alice Pieszecki, a bisexual journalist who maintains The Chart; Dana Fairbanks, a closeted professional tennis player; and Kit Porter, Bette's straight half-sister.

=== Season 2 ===
The second season of The L Word premiered on February 20, 2005, and ended on May 15, 2005. The season introduces Carmen de la Pica Morales, a DJ who becomes part of a love triangle with Shane and Jenny; Helena Peabody, a wealthy art patron who becomes a rival to Bette and love interest to Tina (while she and Bette are separated).

Major story lines in the season include Tina's pregnancy following a second insemination, culminating in Tina and Bette's reconciliation at the end of the season; the introduction of Mark Wayland, a documentary filmmaker who moves in with Shane and Jenny; Kit's acquisition of The Planet following Marina's departure from Los Angeles; Shane and Jenny becoming the unknowing subjects of Mark's documentary after he places hidden cameras in their home; a developing relationship between Alice and Dana; and insights into Jenny's past as an abused child.

=== Season 3 ===
The third season of The L Word premiered on January 8, 2006, and ended on March 26, 2006. The season introduces Max Sweeney, a working-class trans man initially introduced presenting as a butch; and Angus Partridge, a male nanny who becomes Kit's lover.

The season is set six months after the birth of Tina and Bette's daughter Angelica. Major story lines include Bette and Tina's relationship deteriorating once again, due to Tina developing feelings for men; Max coming out as a trans man; Dana's diagnosis with and ultimate death from breast cancer; and Shane and Carmen's engagement and wedding, which ends when Shane abandons Carmen at the altar. Helena is integrated into the primary group of characters as a friend rather than a rival; she acquires a movie studio, where she is entangled in a sexual harassment lawsuit that leads her mother to cut her off financially.

In the lead-up to the third season, the fan fiction website FanLib.com launched a contest where individuals could submit a piece of L Word fanfiction, with the winner's story incorporated into a scene in third-season episode.

=== Season 4 ===
The L Word was renewed for a fourth season on February 2, 2006, and began filming on May 29, 2006. The season aired from January 7, 2007 to March 25, 2007, and introduces Jodi Lerner, a love interest for Bette; Phyllis Kroll, Bette's closeted new boss at California Art College; Paige Sobel, a love interest for Shane; Tasha Williams, a former captain in the Army National Guard and love interest for Alice; and Papi, who has slept with the most women on The Chart. Karina Lombard reprises her role for two episodes.

Major story lines in the season include the adaptation of Lez Girls, an article written by Jenny for The New Yorker, into a film; Bette taking a job as a dean at California Art College; and Tasha's struggle to reconcile her military service with her sexuality under don't ask, don't tell.

=== Season 5 ===
The L Word was renewed for a fifth season on March 9, 2007, and began filming in summer 2007. The season aired from January 6, 2008 to March 23, 2008 and introduces Nikki Stevens, a closeted gay actress who portrays the lead role in Lez Girls. Adele Channing is also introduced, potentially by chance meeting Jenny at the Planet, and soon becoming her personal assistant. Papi and Angus were written out of the series.

Major story lines in the season include Bette and Tina reconciling their relationship, Jenny being ousted from the production of Lez Girls, and Tasha's dishonorable discharge from the military.

=== Season 6 ===
The sixth and final season of The L Word aired from January 18, 2009, to March 8, 2009. The season introduces Kelly Wentworth, Bette's college roommate, who attempts to open a gallery with her; Jamie Chen, a social worker who becomes involved in a love triangle with Alice and Tasha; and Marybeth Duffy and Sean Holden, detectives with the LAPD.

The season is a whodunit story line focused on the murder of Jenny. The events of the season are depicted as a flashback leading up to the night of the crime, with each episode focused around what could have potentially motivated each character to have killed Jenny. The series concludes without revealing the identity of her murderer.

==== Interrogation tapes ====
Following the series finale of The L Word, Showtime released a series of seven short videos depicting Bette, Alice, Tina, Nikki and Shane being questioned by the police over Jenny's murder. The episodes were posted weekly on Showtime's website. Showtime additionally released an interview with L Word series creator Ilene Chaiken, released in two weekly installments. In the interview, Chaiken stated that Alice went to jail for Jenny's murder, but was not necessarily guilty of the crime.

=== Generation Q ===
On July 11, 2017, it was announced a sequel series was in the works with Showtime. Marja-Lewis Ryan has been selected to serve as executive producer and showrunner. On January 31, 2019, Entertainment Weekly reported Showtime had picked up the sequel series for a premiere later in the year, in which Jennifer Beals, Katherine Moennig, and Leisha Hailey would reprise their roles. The new series, titled The L Word: Generation Q, premiered in the fall of 2019.

== Related media ==
=== The Farm ===
In July 2008, Showtime CEO Matthew Blank announced that the network would shoot a pilot for The Farm, an L Word spin-off series based on a pitch from L Word series creator Ilene Chaiken. Set in a women's prison, the series was slated to star Famke Janssen, Melissa Leo, Laurie Metcalf, and Leisha Hailey, the lattermost of whom would reprise her role as Alice Pieszecki. The pilot was shot in December 2008. In April 2009, Showtime declined to pick up The Farm for a full series order.

=== The Real L Word ===
The Real L Word, a reality television series produced by Chaiken, aired on Showtime from June 20, 2010 to September 6, 2012. The series, initially set in Los Angeles and later in Brooklyn, New York City, followed a group of real-life gay women.

=== L Word Mississippi: Hate the Sin ===
L Word Mississippi: Hate the Sin, a documentary directed by Lauren Lazin and produced by Chaiken, premiered on Showtime on August 8, 2014. The documentary, which follows a group of LGBTQ women in rural Mississippi, won the GLAAD Media Award for Outstanding Documentary in 2015.

== Music ==
EZgirl served as The L Word's music composer, while Natasha Duprey served as music supervisor. A total of five soundtracks were produced.

All three of Leisha Hailey's bands were referenced in the series: a song by The Murmurs was used in the first season, Shane wears a shirt for Gush in the second season. Songs by Uh Huh Her were featured in the show's fifth and sixth seasons; Tasha is seen wearing an Uh Huh Her t-shirt during the sixth season.

The band Betty wrote and performed the theme song, which is first introduced in season two. Betty makes numerous appearances in the show, and their music is featured throughout the series.

== Reception ==
The show's first season was "broadcast to critical acclaim and instant popularity"; as an article from The New York Times pointed out:

Before The L Word, female gay characters barely existed in television. Interested viewers had to search and second-guess, playing parlor games to suss out a character's sexuality. Cagney and Lacey? Jo on Facts of Life? Xena and Gabrielle? Showtime's decision in January 2004 to air The L Word, which follows the lives of a group of fashionable Los Angeles gays, was akin to ending a drought with a monsoon. Women who had rarely seen themselves on the small screen were suddenly able to watch gay characters not only living complex, exciting lives, but also making love in restaurant bathrooms and in swimming pools. There was no tentative audience courtship. Instead there was sex, raw and unbridled in that my-goodness way that only cable allows.

Co-creator and executive producer Ilene Chaiken had some issues with the reaction:

I do want to move people on some deep level. But I won't take on the mantle of social responsibility. That's not compatible with entertainment. I rail against the idea that pop television is a political medium. I am political in my life. But I am making serialized melodrama. I'm not a cultural missionary.

While the show was seen as fulfilling gay characters' "obvious and modest representational need" or even the "ferocious desire not only to be seen in some literal sense... but to be seen with all the blood and angst and magic that you possess", the show was criticized for various scenes which served to "reify heteronormativity". The show was also praised for its nuanced consideration (in the first season) of how and in what ways gay women should stand up to the religious right, with the "Provocations" art show story line being "a fictionalized version of what happened when Cincinnati's Contemporary Art Center booked a controversial exhibition of Mapplethorpe photographs in 1990".

As the series progressed, however, reviews became far more negative. By the time the sixth and final season began, The New York Times called the show a "Sapphic Playboy fantasia" that has "shown little interest in variegating portrayals of gay experience. Instead it has seemed to work almost single-mindedly to counter the notion of "lesbian bed death" and repeatedly remind the viewer of the "limits and tortures of monogamy" while "never align[ing] itself with the traditionalist ambitions [for same-sex marriage] of a large faction of the gay rights movement". The decision to make the final season into a murder mystery which was ultimately left unresolved was also met with negative response.

The series currently holds a 57% "Rotten" rating on Rotten Tomatoes.

== Cultural impact and legacy ==
The L Word broke new ground as the first television series to feature an ensemble cast made up of lesbian and bisexual female characters. Similarly, it was also the first television series to be written and directed predominantly by queer women. The series has been lauded for revolutionizing the depiction of queer women on television, particularly for its portrayal of a queer community at a time when lesbian representation was often relegated to a single lesbian character amid an otherwise heterosexual cast. One of the pioneering hallmarks of the series was its graphic lesbian sex scenes from the female gaze, at a time when lesbian sex was "virtually invisible elsewhere on television."

Several shows have referenced The L Word, including South of Nowhere's first season episode "Girls Guide to Dating"; According to Jim; the medical drama House; the first season finale of Weeds, Jon Stewart's The Daily Show (July 24, 2006); Chappelle's Show: The "Lost Episodes"; The Sopranos episode "Live Free or Die"; the American version of The Office; Gilmore Girls fourth season episode "Scene in a Mall"; The Big Gay Sketch Show; The Simpsons episode "You Kent Always Say What You Want"; and Family Guy episode "Brian Sings and Swings".

=== Awards and honors ===
In 2004, Laurel Holloman won a Satellite Award for Best Actress – Television Series Drama. The show was also for a Satellite Award for Best Television Series – Drama in the same year. In the second season, Ossie Davis received a posthumous Emmy Award nomination for Outstanding Guest Actor in a Drama Series in recognition of his portrayal of Bette and Kit Porter's father, Melvin. The show received multiple nominations for GLAAD Media Awards, and both Pam Grier and Jennifer Beals were repeatedly nominated for NAACP Image Awards.

In 2006, The L Word won the GLAAD Media Award for Outstanding Drama Series. It was consequently honored with a Special Recognition Award in 2009 from the same organization.

In 2008, The L Word's companion website was honored at the 59th Annual Technology & Engineering Emmy Awards for Outstanding Achievement in Advanced Media Technology for Best Use of Commercial Advertising on Personal Computers.
