= List of The L Word characters =

This list of The L Word characters is sorted by last name (where possible), and includes both major and minor characters from the American drama The L Word.

== A ==
- Felicity Adams: Lesbian, portrayed by Latarsha Rose. Generation Q
  - Ex-wife of Tyler Adams.
  - Had an affair with Bette Porter while she was married to Tyler and while she was Bette's employee between the events of The L Word and Generation Q.
- Tyler Adams: Straight man, portrayed by Jeffrey Muller. Generation Q.
  - Ex-husband of Felicity Adams, who had an affair with Bette Porter while she was Bette's employee.
- Coleman Alt: Portrayed by Brendan Penny. Season 3.
  - Slept with Frank in 1985.
  - Slept with Bette Porter in 1985.
- Marcus Allenwood: Portrayed by Mark Gibson. Season 1.
  - Tina Kennard's sperm donor, and the biological father of Angelica Porter-Kennard.
  - Has a relationship with Lei Ling.
- Andrew: Portrayed by Darrin Klimek. Season 1.
  - Went on a blind date with Dana Fairbanks, before finding out she was a lesbian.
  - Had a short-term relationship with Alice Pieszecki during season 1.
- April: "Former" lesbian; character only alluded to during Season 3.
  - Dated Alice's first boyfriend; mentioned during episode "Labia Majora".
  - Had a rebound-affair with Alice Pieszecki; mentioned during episode "Labia Majora".
- Kate Arden: Lesbian film director first chosen to direct the film version of Jenny's book Lez Girls. Portrayed by Annabella Sciorra. Season 4.
- Ivan Aycock: Genderqueer, potentially a trans man, portrayed by Kelly Lynch. Seasons 1 and 2.
  - Has a five-year open relationship with Iris, an exotic dancer. Season 2.
  - Courted Kit Porter during Seasons 1 and 2.

== B ==
- Nick Barashov: Straight, portrayed by Julian Sands; minor character with appearance in episode 1.05: "Lies, Lies, Lies".
  - College professor who had an affair with Jenny Schecter during her college years.
- Allen Barnes: Portrayed by Sara Botsford; minor character with appearance during season 2.
  - Barnes is an artist who is friends with Helena Peabody.
  - Taught at Yale and Bette Porter took the course in college; Bette wrote a thesis about her work.
- Sonny Benson: Straight, portrayed by Roger Cross; minor character with appearance during season 6.
  - Stage name of Sunset Boulevard, professional female drag performer/dj who falls in love with Kit Porter.
- Billie Blaikie: Bisexual man; portrayed by Alan Cumming; minor character with appearance during season 3.
  - Has an affair with Max Sweeney during season 3.
  - Was hired and then fired as the manager of The Planet in season 3
- Charlotte Birch: Portrayed by Sandra Bernhard; minor character with appearance during season 2.
  - Teaches writing in college which Jenny attends.
  - Friend of Burr Connor.
- Annette Bishop: Straight, portrayed by Sarah Strange; minor character with appearance during season 1.
  - Best friend of Jenny Schecter.
  - Pretended to be dating Jenny Schecter in episode 1.08: "Listen Up".
- Veronica Bloom: Straight, portrayed by Camryn Manheim; Volatile Hollywood producer who hires Shane McCutcheon in season 2.
- Sunset Boulevard: Straight, portrayed by Roger Cross; minor character with appearance during season 6.
  - Stage name of Sonny Benson.
  - Falls in love with Kit Porter.
- Benjamin Bradshaw: Straight, portrayed by Charles S. Dutton; minor character with appearance during season 2.
  - Married man who had an affair with Kit Porter during season 2.
- Josh Brecker: Straight, portrayed by Paul Popowich; minor character with appearance during season 3.
  - Attempted to have an affair with Tina Kennard in episode 3.07: "Lone Star".
- Brooke: Character only alluded to during the "Pilot" episode.
  - Slept with Heather.
  - Slept with Nina.
- Brooke: Straight, portrayed by Chelsea Hobbs; minor character with appearance during season 4.
  - Dated Max Sweeney without knowing Max was a trans man.
- Faye Buckley: Leader of an extreme right-wing activist group bent on shutting down Bette's art gallery, portrayed by Helen Shaver in season one. Faye's daughter (Cora Buckley) became a pornographic actress after running away from home to escape her abusive father. Faye paid off a district court judge to expunge the record (child services report, missing persons report).

== C ==
- Melanie Caplan: Lesbian, minor character alluded to during season 1 and appearance in season 2.
  - Former girlfriend of Dana Fairbanks; mentioned during the "Pilot" episode.
  - Slept with Heather; mentioned during the "Pilot" episode.
- Jean-Paul Chamois: Portrayed by Robert Gauvin; minor character with appearance during the "Pilot" episode.
  - Was contacted by Bette Porter and Tina Kennard as a possible sperm donor for Tina's insemination.
- Chandra, portrayed by Holly Dignard
- Adele Channing: Portrayed by Malaya Drew; Bisexual; introduced in season 5
  - Jenny Schecter's personal assistant/saboteur/stalker/doppelgänger
  - Kissed Niki Stevens while impersonating Jenny
  - Blackmails Tina's studio into letting her take over directing Jenny's movie
  - Dates the actress portraying "Karina", A.K.A. Begonia, in Lez Girls
- Jamie Chen: Lesbian, portrayed by Meiling Melançon; minor character appearing in season 6 episodes 3 through 9.
  - Is a social worker at the Los Angeles Gay and Lesbian Community Center
  - Becomes best friends with/a third wheel to Alice Pieszecki and Tasha Williams
  - Admits she has fallen in love with Tasha Williams in the series finale, season 6, episode 8
- Lover Cindy: Lesbian; portrayed by Alicia Leigh Willis, generally referred to as "my lover Cindy" or "her lover Cindy"
  - Has long-term, open relationship with Dawn Denbo.
  - Had a three-way with Dawn and Shane
  - Had a tryst with Shane without Dawn's permission or knowledge
  - Revealed that her name is actually Cindi Tucker.
- Claybourne: Lesbian, portrayed by Jill Christensen; minor character with appearance in episode 2.02: "Lap Dance".
  - Married to Robin in 2002. She cheated on her during her wedding celebration.
  - A connection to Lara Perkins is shown on the final chart that appears in the third season finale.
- Katherine Claymore: Lesbian, minor character only alluded to during season 1.
  - Was the first girlfriend of Alice Pieszecki after college; mentioned in episode 1.03: "Let's Do it".
- Clive: Gay, portrayed by Matthew Currie Holmes; minor character with appearance during season 1.
  - Friend of Shane McCutcheon.
  - Slept with Harry Samchuk.
- Roberta Collie: Portrayed by Cynthia Stevenson; minor character with appearance during season 3.
  - Roberta was the adoption-case social worker assigned to evaluate the petition placed by Bette Porter and Tina Kennard.
- Burr Connor: Portrayed by Tony Goldwyn; minor character with appearance in 2.08: "Loyal" and 2.09: "Late, Later, Latent".
  - Was deeply closeted movie star.
  - Friend of Charlotte Birch.
  - Hired Jenny Schecter to get to ghost write his memoir; fired her, re-hired her, confessed his sexuality to her, then fired her again, feeling that she had greater things to write for herself.

== D ==
- Slim Daddy: Straight, portrayed by Snoop Dogg; minor character with appearance during episodes 1.10: "Luck, Next Time" and 1.11: "Liberally".
  - Recorded a song with Kit Porter.
- Gillian Davis: Portrayed by Kelly McGillis; minor character with appearances during episodes 5.7: "Lesbians Gone Wild" and 5.8: "Lay Down the Law".
  - Was a Colonel in the Army National Guard and a JAG officer.
  - Was the lead Army investigator in Tasha Williams' homosexual conduct investigation.
  - While not explicitly stated, showed strong signs of being a closeted lesbian or bisexual woman herself.
  - Called Alice Pieszecki to testify during Tasha's separation board but backed off from her attempts to prove Tasha was a lesbian after Alice made a comment about the possibility of an unwilling person being outed.
- Dax: Lesbian, portrayed by Luvia Petersen; minor character with very brief appearance in Season 1.
  - Friend of Ivan who works with him in the mechanic shop.
  - Appeared as the dancing cowboy in the Kings of the Night at The Planet.
- Carmen de la Pica Morales: Lesbian, portrayed by Sarah Shahi; main character during seasons 2 and 3.
  - Daughter of Mercedes Morales.
  - Niece of Begonia Morales.
  - Her first lesbian experience was with Lucía Torres when she was 16.
  - Had some one-night stands with Shane McCutcheon before starting a relationship with Jenny Schecter.
  - Had a relationship with Jenny Schecter that started and ended in season 2.
  - Admitted to have slept with someone named "Robin" during episode 3.10: "Losing the Light", while dating Shane.
  - Was engaged to Shane McCutcheon until Shane left her at the altar in episode 3.12: "Left Hand of the Goddess".
- Dawn Denbo: Lesbian, portrayed by Elizabeth Keener; minor character appearing in season 5.
  - Miami-based club promoter and owner of Shebar.
  - Long term open relationship with Lover Cindy
  - Had three-way with Shane McCutcheon and Lover Cindy
  - Business rivalry with Kit Porter. Later bought out Ivan Aycock's 51 per cent of The Planet and became majority owner.
  - Vowed vengeance on Shane for seducing "my lover Cindy", and by extension all of Shane's friends
- Gabby Deveaux: Lesbian, portrayed by Guinevere Turner; also known as 'Lesbian X'; minor character with appearances in seasons 1 and 2, and allusions in seasons 1 through 4.
  - Dated Alice Pieszecki during part of season 1 and before of show line story begins.
  - Simultaneously dated Nadia while she was dating Alice during season 1.
  - Dated Lara Perkins during part of season 2.
  - Also involved with Eva "Papi" Torres at the start of season 6.
- Dusty, portrayed by Lucia Rijker, Helena's cellmate (season five) and as Dana's trainer (season two)

== E ==
- Eric: Straight, portrayed by Kyle Cassie; minor character with appearance during episode 1.12: "Looking Back".
  - Was Tina Kennard's boyfriend in 1998, before she started a relationship with Bette Porter.

== F ==
- Dr. Farber, portrayed by Kate Clinton, a lesbian sex therapist to Bette and Tina.
- Dana Fairbanks: Lesbian, portrayed by Erin Daniels; main character from seasons 1 through 3.
  - First lesbian experience was with tennis-mentor "Ralph", when she was sixteen; mentioned during the Pilot episode, episode 1.12: "Looking Back", and episode 3.11: "Last Dance".
  - Daughter of Sharon and Irwin Fairbanks.
  - Sister to Howie Fairbanks.
  - Has a false heterosexual relationship with her doubles partner Harrison Scott; mentioned during the "Pilot" episode and during episode 3.11: "Last Dance".
  - Dated Melanie Caplan; mentioned during the "Pilot" episode.
  - Attempted to date Jenny Schecter in season 1, before deciding to remain friends.
  - Dated Lara Perkins during seasons 1 and 3.
  - Goes to a date with Andrew telling him she is a lesbian.
  - Committed to Tonya during season 1, but later broke up with her in episode 2.06: "Lágrimas de Oro", after cheating on her with Alice for a while.
  - Dated Alice Pieszecki during season 2. According to the story line, she broke up with Alice six months before episode 3.01, "Labia Majora", in order to be with Lara again.
  - Died of heart failure in episode 3.10: "Losing the Light", after having discovered in episode 3.05: "Lifeline" that she had invasive ductal carcinoma, the most common form of breast cancer.
- Howie Fairbanks: Gay, portrayed by Andrew Francis; minor character with appearances in seasons 1 through 3.
  - Son of Sharon and Irwin Fairbanks.
  - Younger brother of Dana Fairbanks.
  - Comes out as gay to Dana and Alice during episode 2.11: "Loud and Proud".
- Irwin Fairbanks: Portrayed by Michael Hogan; minor character with appearance during seasons 1 through 3.
  - Married to Sharon Fairbanks.
  - Father of Dana and Howie Fairbanks.
- Sharon Fairbanks: Portrayed by Susan Hogan; minor character with appearance during seasons 1 through 3.
  - Had a lesbian experience when she was 17.
  - Married to Irwin Fairbanks.
  - Mother of Dana and Howie Fairbanks.
- Gene Feinberg: Straight, portrayed by Tygh Runyan; minor character with appearance during seasons 1 and 2.
  - Dated Jenny Schecter until episode 2.01: "Life, Loss, Leaving".
- Manfredi Ferrer: Portrayed by Derek de Lint; minor character with appearance in episode 2.02: "Lap Dance".
  - Married to Marina Ferrer.
- Marina Ferrer: Lesbian, portrayed by Karina Lombard; main character during season 1.
  - Italian countess married to Manfredi Ferrer hiding her sexual orientation.
  - Has an open relationship with Francesca Wolff for five years.
  - Has an affair with Jenny Schecter while she was engaged to Tim Haspel.
  - Dated Robin Allenwood during season 1.
  - Dated Claude during season 4.
  - This character seems to be an allusion to Kate Millett's Sita (Millett's lover of Italian noble origin, one of whose middle names was "Marina", committed suicide in 1978)
- Lucía Flores: Bisexual. Character only alluded to during season 2.
  - Was Pablo Fuentes' girlfriend before she cheated on him with Carmen de la Pica Morales.
  - She was Carmen's first lesbian experience when she was 16.
- Dan Foxworthy: Straight, portrayed by Daryl Shuttleworth; minor character with appearance during seasons 1, 2, 5 and 6.
  - Therapist of Tina Kennard, Bette Porter, Alice Pieszecki and Tasha Williams.

== G ==
- Valerie Goins: Lesbian, portrayed by Camille Sullivan; minor character with appearance in episode 2.07: "Luminous".
  - Was committed to Leigh Ostin.
- Shelly Greenlee: Portrayed by Linda Ko; minor character with appearance in episodes 2.12: "L'Chaim" and 2.13: "Loud & Proud".
  - Was hired by Bette to care for her dying father.
- Gregg: Straight, portrayed by Robin Nielsen; minor character with appearance in episode 1.12: "Looking Back".
  - Was Alice's college boyfriend.
- Barbara Grisham: Closeted lesbian, portrayed by Dana Delany; minor character with appearance in episode 3.04: "Light My Fire".
  - Senator of the state of Massachusetts.
  - Unsuccessfully attempted to seduce Bette Porter during episode 3.04: "Light My Fire".

== H ==
- Becky Haspel: Straight, portrayed by Georgia Craig; minor character with appearance during episode 3.10: "Losing the Light".
  - Wife of Tim Haspel.
- Timothy "Tim" Haspel: Straight, portrayed by Eric Mabius; main character during season 1 and minor character with appearances during seasons 2, 3 and 6.
  - Married and divorced Jenny Schecter during season 1.
  - Dated Trish Peverell, who was a student that he was coaching, during season 1.
  - Married Becky during season 3.
- Sean Heaney: Straight, portrayed by Bruno Verdoni; minor character with appearance during the "Pilot" episode.
  - Was Tina Kennard's first unsuccessful sperm donor.
  - Slept with Alice Pieszecki.
- Heather: Character only alluded to during the "Pilot" episode.
  - Slept with Brooke.
  - Slept with Mandy.
  - Slept with Melanie Caplan.
- Arianna Huffington: Portrayed by Arianna Huffington herself; minor character with appearance during episode 2.01: "Life, Loss, Leaving".
  - Employer of both Shane McCutcheon and Carmen de la Pica Morales when they meet.

== I ==
- Iris. Portrayed by Mikela J. Mikael; minor character with appearance in episode 2.09: "Late, Later, Latent".
  - Has an open relationship with Ivan Aycock for five years.

== J ==
- Randy Jackson: Straight, portrayed by Kwesi Ameyaw; minor character with appearances in seasons 1 and 3.
  - Friend of Tim Haspel.
  - Husband of Carolyn Varajian.
- Cherie Jaffe or Cherie Peroni: Bisexual, portrayed by Rosanna Arquette; minor character with appearances in seasons 1, 3, and 4, but alluded to in seasons 1 through 3.
  - Mother of Clea Jaffe; mentioned in episode 1.11: "Liberally".
  - Married to Steve Jaffe, later divorced him.
  - Had an affair with Shane McCutcheon during season 1 and later also slept with her in seasons 3 and 4.
- Clea Jaffe: Lesbian, portrayed by Samantha McLeod; minor character with appearance only in season 1.
  - Daughter of Cherie Jaffe and Steve Jaffe.
  - Infatuated with Shane McCutcheon during season 1.
- Steve Jaffe: Straight, portrayed by James Purcell; minor character with appearance only in season 1.
  - Married and then divorced Cherie Jaffe.
  - Father of Clea Jaffe.
- James: His sexual orientation is unknown, but in the last episode of the second season he appears holding a man in the funeral of Bette's father, portrayed by Preston Cook; minor character with appearances during seasons 1 through 6.
  - Assistant of Bette Porter.
- Candace Jewell: Lesbian, portrayed by Ion Overman; minor character with appearances in seasons 1 and 2.
  - Had a relationship with Yolanda Watkins; mentioned in season 1.
  - Had an affair with Bette Porter and started all the friction between Bette and Tina during episodes 1.12: "Looking Back" through 2.01: "Life, Loss, Leaving".
- Lisa Johnson: Straight, portrayed by Crystal Balint; minor character with flashback appearances during episode 4.07: "Lesson Number One" and 4.11: "Literary License to Kill"
  - Appears in flashbacks of Tasha Williams' tour of duty in Iraq.

== K ==
- Nadia Karella: Lesbian, portrayed by Jessica Capshaw; minor character with appearance in episodes 4.02 "Livin' la Vida Loca", 4.03 "Lassoed" and 4.04 "Layup".
  - Slept with Bette Porter.
- Bryan Karikawa: Portrayed by Peter Shinkoda; minor character with appearance during seasons 1 and 2.
  - Subaru representative who works with Dana's advertising campaign.
- Hunter Kirby: Straight, minor character; portrayed by Chris William Martin.
  - Fellow writing student to Jenny in season 2.
- Tina Kennard: Bisexual, portrayed by Laurel Holloman. Main character.
  - Mother of Angelica Porter-Kennard.
  - Dated Eric previous to season 1; mentioned in episode 1.12: "Looking Back".
  - Had an eight-year relationship with Bette Porter with a separation during season 2, a breakup in season 3, and a reunion in season 5.
  - Courted by Joyce Wischnia during season 2.
  - Dated Helena Peabody during episodes 2.05: "Labyrinth" through 2.13: "Lacuna".
  - Attempted to have an affair with film producer Josh Brecker during episode 3.07: "Lone Star".
  - Had a relationship with Henry Young, through episodes 3.09: "Lead, Follow, or Get Out of the Way" to episode 4.11: "Literary License to Kill".
  - Courted by Kate Arden during season 4.
  - Revealed to have had an incestuous relationship with her sister from ages 11 to 15 in the post-season 6 "Interrogation tapes" (canonicity debated)
  - Married Bette between the events of The L Word and Generation Q, but cheated on her with Carrie, which led to their final separation and divorce.
  - Became engaged to Carrie during the events of Generation Q.
- Leonard Kroll: Straight man, portrayed by Bruce Davison; minor character with three appearances
  - Husband/ex-husband of Phyllis Kroll
  - Father of Molly Kroll
- Molly Kroll: straight-turned-bisexual-turned-lesbian, portrayed by Clementine Ford
  - Daughter of Phyllis and Leonard Kroll.
  - "Girl crush" on Shane McCutcheon, and later slept with her
- Phyllis Kroll: Lesbian, portrayed by Cybill Shepherd.
  - Wife/ex-wife of Leonard Kroll
  - Mother of Molly
  - Had her first lesbian infatuation/relationship with Alice.
  - On again, off again relationship with her first divorce attorney, Joyce Wischnia.
- Aaron Kornbluth: Straight, portrayed by Brian Markinson, introduced in season 4
  - Executive for Shaolin Productions
  - Worked with Tina and Jenny during the making of Lez Girls
  - Partnered with William and Adele at the end of Season 5

== L ==
- Lacey: Lesbian, portrayed by Tammy Lynn Michaels; minor character appearing during Season 1.
  - Slept with Shane McCutcheon.
- Jodi Lerner: Lesbian, portrayed by Marlee Matlin; main character during seasons 4 and 5 who is credited on Season 6.
  - Sculptor; professor and student adviser at the California University School of Arts where Bette is dean. She had a serious long-term relationship with Bette Porter until Bette cheated on her to go back to Tina Kennard.
- Lei Ling: Straight, portrayed by Taayla Markell; minor character with appearance in episode 1.07: "Losing It".
  - Girlfriend of Marcus Allenwood.
  - Becomes upset after discovering Marcus donated sperm to Tina and threatens legal action to gain custody of the child.
  - Stops harassing Tina after Marcus convinces her to leave Tina alone.
- Lisa: Lesbian-identified man portrayed by Devon Gummersall; minor character appearing season 1.
  - Dated Alice Pieszecki from episode 1.07: "Losing It" to 1.10: "Luck, Next Time".
- Julia Lourd: Lesbian, portrayed by Ann-Marie MacDonald; minor character with appearing season 3.
  - Project partner of Bette Porter for the Art of Dissent exhibit.

== M ==
- Kevin Mador: Nicki Stevens' talent agent, portrayed by Aaron Craven, recurring in four episodes of season 5.
- Winnie Mann: Lesbian, portrayed by Melissa Leo; minor character with appearance during season 2.
  - Former partner of Helena Peabody; mentioned in episode 2.06: "Lágrimas de Oro".
  - Birth-mother of Wilson Mann Peabody.
  - Adoptive mother of Jun Ying Mann Peabody.
- Clea Mason: Lesbian, portrayed by Melanie Lynskey; minor character with appearances in season 5.
  - Attempts to start a relationship with Alice Pieszecki in episode 5.12: "Loyal and True".
- Tom Mater: Gay, portrayed by Jon Wolfe Nelson; minor character appearing in seasons 4, 5 and 6.
  - Interpreter for Jodi Lerner.
  - Has a relationship with Max Sweeney in season 6.
  - Impregnates Max Sweeney, and later abandons him in season 6.
- Carla McCutcheon: Straight, minor character with appearance during episode 3.12: "Left Hand of the Goddess".
  - Mother of Shay McCutcheon.
  - Wife of Gabriel McCutcheon.
- Gabriel McCutcheon: Straight, portrayed by Eric Roberts; minor character with appearance during episode 3.12: "Left Hand of the Goddess".
  - Father of Shane and Shay McCutcheon.
  - Married to Carla McCutcheon.
  - While visiting Canada during episode 3.12: "Left Hand of the Goddess", he had an affair and ran away with a girl named Patty, leaving his wife and son behind.
- Shane McCutcheon: Lesbian, portrayed by Katherine Moennig; main character.
  - Daughter of Gabriel McCutcheon.
  - Older half-sister of Shay McCutcheon.
  - Slept with Mandy. Mentioned in the "Pilot" episode.
  - Slept with Lisa.
  - Slept with Lacey.
  - Had an affair with Cherie Jaffe, and slept with her again in season 3.
  - Roommate of Jenny Schecter since season 2.
  - Had a relationship with Carmen de la Pica Morales that ended in episode 3.12: "Left Hand of the Goddess", when she left Carmen at the altar.
  - Has slept with around 950 to 1200 people, mostly one-night stands of which names are unknown. Number is later given as 963 according to Alice's OurChart.com server, mentioned in episode 4.01: "Legend in the Making".
  - Had a relationship with Paige.
  - Object of Molly Kroll's "straight girl crush", and later slept with her, and later had a short-lived relationship in season 5.
  - In a relationship with Jenny Schecter in season 6.
- Shay McCutcheon: Portrayed by Aidan Jarrar. Minor character with appearance during episode 3.12: "Left Hand of the Goddess", and throughout the beginning of the 4th season
  - Son of Gabriel and Carla McCutcheon, and half-brother of Shane McCutcheon
  - Moves in with Shane after his mother abandoned him in response to his father's affair.
  - Is taken away by his father after he returns from his affair in "Lacy Lilting Lyrics".
- Stacey Merkin: Lesbian, portrayed by Heather Matarazzo. A reporter interviewing Jenny Schecter posing as an ally she later reveals her true colors when she writes a jealousy-driven bad review of Jenny's book.
- Claude Mondrian: Lesbian, portrayed by Élodie Bouchez. A French-Canadian freelance writer.
  - Had an affair with Jenny in season 3.
  - Had a relationship with Marina in season 4.
- Begoña : Portrayed by Patricia Velásquez; minor character with appearances during season 5.
  - Plays the part of Karina in Lez Girls.
- Mercedes Morales: Straight, portrayed by Irene López; minor character with appearances during season 3.
  - Mother of Carmen de la Pica Morales. Mentioned in episode 3.01: "Labia Majora".
- Dylan Moreland: Straight-turned-lesbian, portrayed by Alexandra Hedison; minor character with appearances in seasons 3, 4, and 6'.
  - Has a boyfriend named Danny.
  - Seduces Helena Peabody and later files sexual harassment charges against her as a means of extortion. In the process, she becomes a lesbian and develops real feelings for Helena. She later returns the money she extorted and has a relationship with Helena, who has forgiven her, in season 6.

== N ==
- Nadia: Lesbian, portrayed by Natasha Jean; minor character with appearance in episode 1.04: "Longing".
  - Dated Gabby Deveaux.
- Nina: Character only alluded to during the "Pilot" episode.
  - Slept with Alice Pieszecki; mentioned during the "Pilot" episode.
  - Slept with Brooke; mentioned during the "Pilot" episode.
- Nadia: Portrayed by Jessica Capshaw during the beginning of season 4. She was a teacher's assistant and worked with Bette.
  - Had an affair with Bette.

== O ==
- Leigh Ostin: Lesbian, portrayed by Cobie Smulders; minor character with appearance during season 2.
  - Had a relationship with Valerie Goins; mentioned in episode 2.07: "Luminous"
  - Dated Helena Peabody during episodes 2.11: "Loud and Proud" to 2.13: "Lacuna".

== P ==
- Papi: Lesbian, portrayed by Janina Gavankar; major character; first mentioned in episode 3.09: "Lead Follow or Get Out of the Way" when Carmen credits her with the reason she did not make it to her prom, her first appearance, however was on episode 4.02: "Livin' la Vida Loca".
  - As of season 4 and according to Alice's chart, Papi has slept with the most people in the series; mentioned in episode 4.01: "Legend in the Making".
  - Slept with Alice Pieszecki on episode 4.02: "Livin' la Vida Loca".
  - Slept with Helena Peabody on episode 4.02: "Livin' la Vida Loca".
  - Has a one-night stand with Ruby.
  - Has an affair with Saskia on episode 4.06: "Luck Be a Lady".
  - Slept with Tasha Williams during her college years; mentioned on episode 4.06: "Luck be a Lady".
  - Has an affair with Kit Porter during season 4.
  - Had an affair with Carmen de la Pica Morales during their college years agreeing with Alice's OurChart.com shown at season 4 finale.
  - Slept with Gabby Deveaux on episode 6.01
  - Her real name is Eva Torres
- Angus Partridge: Bisexual, portrayed by Dallas Roberts; major character; first appearance in episode 3.01: "Labia Majora".
  - Angelica Kennard's "manny" (male nanny).
  - Boyfriend of Kit Porter.
  - Had an affair with Hazel in season 4.
- Helena Peabody: Lesbian, portrayed by Rachel Shelley; major character in season 2, main character since season 3; first appearance in season 2 episode 2.04 Lynch Pin.
  - Director of the Peabody Foundation.
  - Daughter of Peggy Peabody.
  - Mother of Wilson and Yun Jing.
  - Had a relationship with Winnie Mann, the biological mother of Wilson previously of season 2.
  - Has an affair with Tina Kennard during season 2.
  - Has an affair with Leigh Ostin during season 2.
  - Has an affair with Isabella during season 2.
  - Has an affair with Dylan Moreland who financially exploits her during season 3.
  - Accused of sexual harassment by Dylan Moreland.
  - Is cut off financially by her wealthy mother and becomes poor, homeless and goes to stay with Alice.
  - Slept with Papi in season 4, episode 4.02 Livin' La Vida Loca.
  - Has an affair with gambler Catherine Rothberg during season 4 and makes money for her.
  - Was arrested in season 5 for stealing Catherine's money.
  - Has an affair with Dusty while in jail after a fierce nightmare.
  - She gets back the Peabody fortune in the season 5 finale.
  - She buys the SheBar (thanks to "Lover Cindi") to help Kit Porter, and they rename the club as "The Hit Club"
  - Resumes her relationship with Dylan Moreland in season 6, after "testing" her in order to estimate whether Dylan is after her money and wants to exploit her again or actually cares for her.
  - In her interrogation tape with Sgt. Duffy, she reveals she didn't hide Catherine Rothberg's money. She used it to piss her off, because Catherine was a big republican, so she donated it to lesbian centers, fertility clinics, etc.
  - Returned to England between the events of The L Word and Generation Q.
- Peggy Peabody: Bisexual, portrayed by Holland Taylor; minor character with appearances in seasons 1 through 6.
  - Major supporter of the CAC and Bette Porter in Season 1.
  - Mother of Helena Peabody, gave the reins of her Foundation to her daughter in Season 2.
  - Had an affair with Marilyn in 1973. Restarted a relationship with her in episode 3.12: "Left Hand of the Goddess".
- Lara Perkins: Lesbian, portrayed by Lauren Lee Smith; minor character with appearances during seasons 1 through 3.
  - Dated Dana Fairbanks during season 1, and later during season 3.
  - Dated Gabby Deveaux during season 2.
  - Starts a relationship with Alice Pieszecki during episode 3.11: "Last Dance", which ended before episode 4.01: "Legend in the Making".
  - A connection to Claybourne is shown on the final chart that appears in the third season finale.
- Isabella Pernao: Portrayed by Carmen Aguirre; minor character with appearance during season 1.
  - Was the performer of the art piece Jesus Is in Me, presented by Bette Porter during the Provocations exhibit.
- Trish Peverell: Straight, portrayed by Nicole McKay; minor character with appearance during season 1.
  - Dated Tim Haspel during season 1.
- Franklin Phillips: Straight, portrayed by Michael Tomlinson; minor character with appearance during seasons 1 and 2.
  - Board member of the CAC. Supervisor of Bette Porter.
- Alice Pieszecki: Bisexual, portrayed by Leisha Hailey; main character.
  - Daughter of Lenore Pieszecki.
  - Dated Bette Porter in 1996.
  - Mentions to have been involved with Sean Heaney (Tina's unsuccessful sperm donor) during the Pilot episode.
  - Mentions to have slept with Nina while speaking to Dana during the Pilot episode.
  - Was girlfriend of Katherine Claymore after graduating from college (mentioned in episode 1.03: "Let's Do It").
  - During college she had a boyfriend named Gregg, with whom she had a band named "Butter". Mentioned in episode 1.12: "Looking Back".
  - Dumped Gregg for Tayo, a lesbian bass-player. Mentioned in episode 1.12: "Looking Back".
  - Restarts and ends an on-and-off steady hot-and-cold relationship with Gabby Deveaux during season 1.
  - Dates "Lisa", the 'lesbian-identified man', during part of Season 1.
  - Dates Andrew, right after dumping "Lisa".
  - Has a stable relationship with Dana Fairbanks, during most of season 2.
  - Had a rebound affair with April, who was the former girlfriend of her first boyfriend. Mentioned in episode 3.01: "Labia Majora".
  - Dates vampirologist Uta Refson during episodes 3.05: "Lifeline" through 3.07: "Latecomer"
  - Goes on a date with Xandra which was interrupted by Dana Fairbanks unhealthy state.
  - Starts a relationship with Lara Perkins in episode 3.11: "Last Dance" which ended before episode 4.01: "Legend in the Making".
  - Sleeps with Papi on episode 4.02: "Livin' la Vida Loca".
  - Has a relationship with Phyllis Kroll that lasts from episode 4.04: "Lay Up" to 4.06: "Luck Be a Lady".
  - Has a relationship with Tasha Williams that starts in episode 4.06: "Luck Be a Lady".
- Lenore Pieszecki: Portrayed by Anne Archer; minor character with appearance during season 1.
  - Mother of Alice Pieszecki.
  - Attempts to seduce Shane McCutcheon during episode 1.05: "Lies, Lies, Lies".
- Angelica Porter-Kennard: Bisexual or lesbian, portrayed by Olivia Windbiel and Jordan Hull; main character appearing since season 2 and in Generation Q
  - Daughter of Tina Kennard and Bette Porter.
  - Her biological father is Marcus Allenwood.
  - Started relationship with Jordi in "Labels"
- Bette Porter: Lesbian, portrayed by Jennifer Beals; the main character.
  - Daughter of Melvin Porter.
  - Half-sister of Kit Porter.
  - Aunt of David Waters.
  - Mother of Angelica Porter-Kennard.
  - Slept with Coleman Alt in 1984.
  - Kissed Kelly Freemont/Wentworth, her straight college roommate—mentioned during episode 6.02: "Least Likely". Her sister Kit later mentions that she almost killed herself over Kelly (episode 6.04: "Leaving Los Angeles").
  - Dated Alice Pieszecki in 1996.
  - Had an affair with Candace Jewell starting in episode 1.13: "Locked Up" and ending in episode 2.01: "Life, Loss, Leaving".
  - Had an eight-year relationship with Tina Kennard, with a separation at the end of season 1, due to her cheating with Candace, a reconciliation by the end of season 2, and a break-up during episode 3.09: "Lead, Follow or Get Out of the Way".
  - Had a one-night stand with an unidentified woman while in New York, during episode 2.04: "Lynch Pin".
  - Had sex with a grad student of the university where she was the art department dean, named Nadia Karella, in episode 4.03: "Lassoed".
  - Had a relationship with Jodi Lerner during seasons 4 and 5.
  - Had an affair with the love of her life, Tina Kennard, in season 5 while she was dating Jodi Lerner, starting on episode 5.04: "Let's Get This Party Started". They later got back together.
  - Phyllis Kroll said Bette "was, is and will always be the woman of her dreams" during episode 6.03: "LMFAO"
  - Resists Kelly's attempt to seduce her during episode 6.06: "Lactose Intolerant".
- Kate 'Kit' Porter: Straight, portrayed by Pam Grier; main character.
  - Daughter of Melvin Porter.
  - Half-sister of Bette Porter.
  - Mother of David Waters.
  - Intended to start a relationship with Ivan Aycock during season 2.
  - Had an affair with Benjamin Bradschaw during season 2.
  - Has a relationship with Angus during season 3 and 4.
  - Has an unsuccessful affair with Papi during season 4.
  - Business rivalry with Dawn Denbo.
  - Relationship with professional female impersonator and straight male named Sunset Boulevard in season 6.
- Melvin Porter: Straight, portrayed by Ossie Davis, minor character with appearances in seasons one and two.
  - Bette and Kit Porter's father; and David Waters and Angelica Porter-Kennard's grandfather.
  - Openly disapproved of Bette's lesbian relationship with Tina, to include refusing to acknowledge Tina's unborn child as his grandchild or calling Tina by her first name.
  - Diagnosed with advanced prostate cancer during the episode "Loud and Proud" and decides to refuse medical treatment.
  - Dies in the episode "L'Chaim" with Bette and Kit by his side.

== Q–R ==
- "Ralph": Portrayed by Tara Wilson; minor character with appearance alluded to during season 1 and 3.
  - "Ralph" is a famous tennis player, whose real identity is kept secret by Dana because of her celebrity status. Mentioned during the "Pilot" episode.
  - "Ralph" was Dana's first lesbian experience when she was 17. It is first mentioned during the "Pilot" episode. "Ralph" appears during a flashback of Dana's coming out story in episode 1.12: "Looking Back".
- Uta Refson: Bisexual, portrayed by Erica Cerra; minor character with appearance during season 3.
  - Dated Alice Pieszecki during episodes 3.05: "Lifeline" through 3.07: "Lone Star".
- Melissa Rivers: Bisexual, portrayed by herself; minor character with appearance during season 2.
  - Starts a relationship with Tonya in episode 2.06: "Lágrimas de oro".
- Robin: Lesbian, portrayed by Anne Ramsay. Dated Jenny from episode 1.12: "Looking Back" to 2.03: "Loneliest Number". Also dated Marina Ferrer briefly.
- Catherine Rothberg: Lesbian, portrayed by Sandrine Holt; minor character appearing in season 4.
  - Is a professional gambler.
  - Enslaves Helena Peabody under the guise of a relationship in season 4, as a means of getting money back that Helena owes her.
  - Convinces Helena Peabody to bet $100,000 on a horse race, which she ends up losing and, consequently, is unable to fund Alice Pieszecki's "Our Chart" website.

== S ==
- Harry Samchuk: Gay, portrayed by Colin Cunningham; minor character with appearance in episodes 1.06: "Lawfully" and 1.07: "Losing It".
  - Pays Clive to sleep with him.
  - Attempts to seduce Shane McCutcheon, until Shane tells him she is a woman. (Episode 1.07: "Losing It").
- Jenny Schecter: Lesbian, portrayed by Mia Kirshner; main character.
  - Daughter of Sandy Ziskin. (First name revealed in Episode 1.07: "Losing It", and last name revealed in 3.01: "Labia Majora").
  - Stepdaughter of Warren Ziskin.
  - Engaged and married to Tim Haspel during season 1. By the beginning of season 2, they already were divorced.
  - Best friend of Shane McCutcheon
  - Writes a story for "The New Yorker", which later becomes a book and ultimately a Hollywood movie starring Niki Stevens, entitled "Lez Girls", based on the lives of herself, Tina Kennard, Bette Porter, Marina Ferrer, Shane McCutcheon, Alice Pieszecki, Tim Haspel, Kit Porter, Dana Fairbanks and Helena Peabody, in the book, named respectively: Jesse, Nina, Bev, Karina, Shaun, Alyse, Jim, Kat, Donna and Helen.
  - Seduced by Marina Ferrer and had an affair with her during season 1, Jenny's first relationship with another woman.
  - Had an affair with Nick Barashov during her college years. Mentioned in episode 1.05: "Lies, Lies, Lies".
  - Attempted to make out with Dana Fairbanks during episode 1.11: "Liberally".
  - Dated Robin from episode 1.12: "Looking Back" to 2.03: "Loneliest Number".
  - Dated Gene Feinberg from episode 1.13: "Locked Up" to 2.01: "Life, Loss, Leaving".
  - Had a relationship with Carmen de la Pica Morales during season 2.
  - Had a relationship with Max Sweeney during season 3.
  - Started an affair with Claude during episode 3.12: "Left Hand of the Goddess".
  - Had a relationship with Niki Stevens during season 5.
  - Had a relationship with Shane McCutcheon during season 6.
  - Died by suicide in the series finale; manner of death confirmed in The L Word: Generation Q
- Harrison Scott: Closeted gay, portrayed by Landy Cannon; minor character with appearance in seasons 1 and 3.
  - Doubles partner and make-believe boyfriend of Dana Fairbanks before she came out as lesbian.
- Paige Sobel: Bisexual, portrayed by Kristanna Loken. Has a relationship with Shane McCutcheon during season 4.
  - Mother of Jared Sobel, school friend of Shay McCutcheon
- Niki Stevens: Lesbian, portrayed by Kate French; recurring character appearing in seasons 5 and 6.
  - Famous movie star reportedly based on Lindsay Lohan.
  - Is closeted in her public life.
  - Had a relationship with Jenny Schecter in season 5.
  - Hooked up with Shane McCutcheon after her relationship with Jenny Schecter ended in season 5 and pursues a relationship with her in season 6.
  - Dated a boi named Jimmi. Mentioned in episode 5.05 "Lookin' at You, Kid"
  - Had an affair with Paris Hilton. Mentioned in episode 6.02 "Least Likely"
- Max Sweeney: Bisexual trans man portrayed by Daniel Sea. Joined the main cast during season 3. First appeared in episode 3.01: "Labia Majora".
  - Has a relationship with Jenny Schecter during season 3.
  - Has an affair with Billie Blaikie during season 3.
  - Dated Brooke during the beginning of season 4.
  - Has an affair with Grace during season 4 that bridges into friendship during season 5.
  - Dates Tom, the interpreter for Jodi Lerner, during season 5.
  - Is impregnated and abandoned by Tom in season 6.
  - His return in The L Word: Generation Q reveals Max later married a trans woman with them happily raising both their children from past relationships together.

== T ==
- Tayo: Lesbian, portrayed by Marta Jaciubek; minor character with appearance only in season 1, episode 1.12: "Looking Back".
  - Had an affair with Alice Pieszecki during her college years. Mentioned in episode 1.12: "Looking Back". Tayo is Alice's first lesbian experience.
- Tonya: Lesbian, portrayed by Meredith McGeachie; minor character with appearance in seasons 1 through 3.
  - Was engaged to Dana Fairbanks until episode 2.06: "Lágrimas de oro".
  - Had a relationship with Melissa Rivers that started in episode 2.06: "Lágrimas de oro", but ended somewhere before episode 3.10: "Losing the Light".

== U–V ==
- Carolyn Varajian: Straight, portrayed by Jennifer Copping; minor character with appearance during season 1.
  - Married to Randy Jackson.
- Conrad Voynow: Straight, portrayed by Ari Cohen; minor character with appearance during season 1.
  - Conrad was Dana's manager during season 1, before she came out as a lesbian during the Subaru campaign.

== W ==
- David Waters: Straight, portrayed by Colin Lawrence; minor character.
  - Son of Kit Porter.
  - Nephew of Bette Porter.
  - Grandchild of Melvin Porter.
  - Does not accept Bette and Tina's decision to raise their daughter Angelica together in a lesbian relationship and refuses to vouch for them in front of their adoption social worker.
- Yolanda Watkins: Lesbian, portrayed by Kimberly Hawthorne; minor character with appearance in season 1.
  - Dated Candace Jewell.
- Mark Wayland: Straight, portrayed by Eric Lively; major character in season 2.
  - Documentary film maker; roomed with Shane McCutcheon and Jenny Schecter.
  - Betrayed Jenny Schecter and Shane McCutcheon by setting up hidden cameras throughout the house.
- Kelly Wentworth: Bisexual, portrayed by Elizabeth Berkley; minor character appearing in season 6.
  - College roommate of Bette Porter
  - Opens an art gallery in Los Angeles with Bette Porter in season 6.
  - Unsuccessfully tries to seduce Bette Porter in season 6.
- Tasha Williams: Lesbian, portrayed by Rose Rollins; major character with appearances in seasons 4 through 6.
  - Best friend of Papi.
  - In a relationship with Alice Pieszecki in seasons 4, 5 and 6.
  - Was a Captain in the Army National Guard and a Military Police officer.
  - Did a tour in Iraq, where she witnessed some of her subordinates getting killed.
  - Suffers from Posttraumatic stress disorder as a result of her wartime service.
  - Was discharged from the Army under "Don't ask, don't tell" by confessing her love for Alice Pieszecki during her separation board on the episode "Lay Down the Law".
  - Continued to date Alice after her discharge, but had relationship problems stemming from various issues to include Alice making more money than her and the introduction of Jaime Chen.
  - Decides to become a civilian police officer and was attending the police academy as of season 6.
- Joyce Wischnia: Lesbian, portrayed by Jane Lynch; minor character with appearances in seasons 2 through 6.
  - Slept with almost all of her clients.
  - Joyce was Tina Kennard's lawyer during the separation case she filed to Bette Porter, during season 2.
  - Courted Tina Kennard during season 2.
  - Became Bette Porter's attorney for the sole custody petition she filed against Tina Kennard during season 3. Later served as a mediator to settle shared custody during season 4.
  - Had a relationship with Phyllis Kroll during seasons 4, 5 and 6, after having recused herself as Phyllis's divorce attorney because of their romantic interest.
- Dr. Wilson: Portrayed by Judith Maxie; minor character with appearance in seasons 1 through 3.
  - Dr. Wilson is Tina Kennard's gynecologist.
  - Dr. Wilson was also the doctor of Dana Fairbanks when she was diagnosed with breast cancer.
- Francesca Wolff: Lesbian, portrayed by Lolita Davidovich; minor character with appearance in season 1.
  - Partner of Marina Ferrer; mentioned during season 1.
  - Had an affair with a prima ballerina in Portugal; mentioned during season 1.

== X ==
- Xandra: Lesbian, goes on a date with Alice in episode 3.10: "Losing the Light" before Dana gets sick.

== Y ==
- Henry Young: Straight, portrayed by Steven Eckholdt; minor character with appearances in seasons 3 and 4.
  - Father of Mikey Young.
  - Had a relationship with Tina Kennard that began in episode 3.09: "Lead, Follow, or Get Out of the Way", unaware that Tina was using him to get sole custody of Angelica. He ended the relationship and had her move out of his home in season 4 when he realized the truth.
- Mikey Young: Minor character with appearance in season 3.
  - Son of Henry Young.

== Z ==
- Sandy Ziskin or Sandy Schecter: Straight, portrayed by Margot Kidder; minor character alluded to during seasons 1 and 2, with appearance in episode 3.01: "Labia Majora".
  - Mother of Jenny Schecter. Her name is revealed in season 1.
- Warren Ziskin: Straight, portrayed by Stephen Aberle; minor character with appearance during episode 3.01: "Labia Majora".
  - Married to Sandy Ziskin.
  - Stepfather of Jenny Schecter.
