= Alice Pieszecki =

- First appearance: Pilot (episode 1.01), Let's Do It Again (episode 1.01)
- Last appearance: L Word (episode 6.08)
- Created by: Ilene Chaiken
- Portrayed by: Leisha Hailey

In-universe information
- Gender: Female
- Occupation: Journalist; Radio Personality (2.09-4.07); Host on the Look (5.12-6.03)
- Family: Lenore Pieszecki (mother)

Alice Elisabeth Pieszecki is a fictional bisexual character on the Showtime television network series The L Word, and the sequel series L Word: Generation Q, shown nationally in the United States. She is played by American actress Leisha Hailey.

Alice lives in Los Angeles, California, and mostly hangs out in West Hollywood. During the first seasons, she is often seen with her best friends, Shane McCutcheon (Katherine Moennig) and Dana Fairbanks (Erin Daniels). Further into the show, she befriends Helena Peabody (Rachel Shelley), and has romantic relationships with various recurrent lead characters, most notably Dana Fairbanks (Erin Daniels) and Tasha Williams (Rose Rollins). She was listed in AfterEllen.com's Top 50 Favorite Female TV Characters.

== Storylines ==
=== Backstory ===
Alice is a journalist for LA Magazine. Among her group of lesbian friends, she is the only self-proclaimed bisexual. Her bisexual mother Lenore is an actress, and the only one in the family who accepts Alice's sexuality. Alice is estranged from her two siblings, who disapprove of bisexuality, as well as her father, whom she simply describes as "distant".

Alice is obsessed with The Chart, a recompilation of all the relationships and one-night stands which she knows of, and how this network of affairs is linked to her. Alice strongly believes everyone is sleeping with everyone else, and her chart is the most valuable evidence supporting her theory.

=== The L Word ===
Alice briefly dates Lisa, a Lesbian identified man but realizes that her true feelings lie with Dana Fairbanks, with whom she is best friends. Dana is currently engaged to Tonya. Shortly after Dana and Tonya announce their engagement, Alice visits Dana to tell her she can't marry Tonya and impulsively kisses her, and their true feelings for one another are revealed as Dana kisses her back. Dana eventually splits up with Tonya (made easier when Tonya casually admits she had been cheating on Dana, implying that Tonya was only interested in Dana for her fame). Though the two seem happy in their relationship, Dana's ex Lara comes back at the end of the second season, raising Alice's suspicions, particularly when Dana shows surprise at Alice's suggestion that they live together and refuses to say she loves her. Though Dana confides in Alice that she wants to visit Lara to talk and get closure on their past relationship, Alice's fears are realized when it is revealed in the third season that Dana's dinner with Lara was Lara's attempt to resume their relationship knowing that Alice is with Dana. As a result, Alice is subsequently left devastated to the point of stalking and obsessing over Dana despite her friends' attempts to get her to move on. Alice has a brief affair with a woman named Uta, whom Alice becomes convinced is a vampire, and is slowly able to overcome her heartbreak, but Dana is later diagnosed with terminal breast cancer, and in her depression she shuns Lara, telling her to leave and find someone else, and turns to Alice for support. Alice and Dana's friends all provide her with love and friendship during her final weeks. After Dana dies Alice and the others are devastated. They attend her visitation but are treated as secondary people by not being allowed to sit near the front, which was for "close friends and relatives". During the service the minister said Dana could have found a man to care for her, which does not go over well with her friends and ends with Alice standing up and proclaiming that "Dana was Gay" and then leaving the room.

The group of friends are then seen sitting in the hallway waiting for Alice who returns with a paper cup with Dana's ashes in it saying they were going to have their own service for Dana at the camp Dana had told Alice about shortly after they met. Losing Dana weighed heavily on the group of close friends but especially to Alice who said that Dana was the love of her life.

Alice begins video podcasting on OurChart and discovers a woman named Papi who has the highest amount of sexual encounters on the chart. Through her, she later meets and starts dating Tasha Williams, a Captain in the Army National Guard. During a confrontation between Papi's friends in Alice's apartment, Tasha accidentally hits her in the eye while trying to break up a fight and has to take her to the hospital. While at the hospital Alice realizes Tasha's commitment to being loyal and honoring the Army's code of honor resulting in the two of them having a disagreement about the ethics of the Iraq war. Despite their differences in politics, they choose to continue their relationship.

The following season, after Tasha is seen in public with Alice by one of her homophobic subordinates in the Army, Alice is drawn into an investigation which results in Tasha ending her military career. During the investigation, two Army investigators come to her apartment and start to invade her privacy looking for evidence of Tasha having a lesbian relationship with her. Alice asks the officers to leave and then proceeds to hide evidence of her relationship with Tasha. In response, Tasha goes to her lawyer's house and berates him for not giving her prior warning of the visit by the investigators.

Alice is invited to a party for closeted homosexual celebrities and, despite signing a non-disclosure agreement, captures a video of Daryl Brewer, a closeted pro basketball player, in an intimate moment with another man. Later, Tasha and Alice watch Brewer make homophobic remarks on the news in response to another player coming out as Gay. After processing the homophobic actions of the ball player Alice decides to put the incriminating video on her podcast. It goes viral and Alice becomes the center of a media storm for outing Brewer, subsequently destroying his career and his family. Alice defends her actions on a national news broadcast. This angers Tasha because it jeopardizes her Army investigation and opens another rift in her relationship with Alice.

Shortly after, Alice and Tasha decide they can no longer be together. During Tasha's separation board hearing for homosexual conduct, Alice testifies in front of Colonel Gillian Davis, who herself is implied to be a closeted lesbian, and makes a statement about being outed that caused Davis to back off on trying to get Tasha discharged. However, Tasha decided that she no longer wanted to serve in the Army if she cannot be with the person she loves and admits to the board that she is indeed in love with Alice, effectively outing herself and resulting in her discharge.

After Tasha is discharged from the Army under Don't ask, don't tell, they continue their relationship where it left off, though it's a little unsteady. Just about the same time, Alice gets a host spot on a TV show called "The Look", where she meets Clea Mason, a clothing designer from Aotearoa (New Zealand). Alice develops an instant attraction to her, but decides to resist those feelings in order to work on her relationship with Tasha.

As Alice and Tasha's relationship continues to wane, she tries her best to make things work. An encounter with Gabby Deveaux at Papi's house on the season premiere triggers Alice to admit her troubled past, and to refuse to part ways with Tasha. They are shown visiting the show's recurrent therapist Dan Foxworthy, who decrees their relationship to be ill-fated. Nonetheless they try to stick together.

Also on this season, Alice has decided to venture into the film business by writing a treatment on a killer idea she had. A potential conflict of interest with Jenny is hinted as a not-very-excited Schecter is suggested as a reviewer for the treatment by Tina. Jenny later diminishes Alice's treatment as unoriginal. But when Jenny eventually writes and sells a script featuring the exact premise of Alice's treatment, Alice is furious and gives an ultimatum to Shane, who is now romantically involved with Jenny, to dump Jenny or lose their long-standing friendship.

In her job as a host on The Look, Alice reads a letter on the air from a girl whose brother was killed in a hate crime because he sent a love letter to another boy. This results in her being fired, but also results in a call from a woman named Jamie Chen, who works at a Gay and Lesbian Center, to help talk the letter writer off a ledge.

Alice becomes more heavily involved with the center after doing this, and she and Tasha become fast friends with Jamie. It becomes obvious to some of Alice's friends that Alice, Jaime and Tasha are all becoming attracted to each other, but as time passes, Alice begins to suspect that the attraction between Tasha and Jamie, who are much more closely matched than either woman with Alice, is stronger. After the three friends lose a dance contest at the charity dance for the Gay & Lesbian Center that they orchestrated, Alice tearfully tells Tasha to pursue a relationship with Jamie, and then again presents this idea during a later lunch meeting with the pair, where Jaime admits that she has fallen in love with Tasha, while Tasha responds with silence, leaving it ambiguous as to whether or not she reciprocates Jaime's feelings. Though Tasha insists that she does not want to do this, she swears at Alice when she accuses her of fantasizing about Jaime. Remembering how Dana previously abused and betrayed her feelings, Alice angrily tells Tasha to make a decision and leaves, in effect letting her go.

When Tasha does not immediately contact her, Alice assumes that she has chosen Jamie.

Alice attends Bette and Tina's going away party, as they are moving to New York, and tells her friends that she has decided to make peace with Jenny for Shane's sake. However, it is Alice who first alerts the party guests to the discovery of Jenny's body in Bette and Tina's pool. Tasha arrives at the scene, being allowed to enter after showing proof of being in the police academy, and comforts Alice. The series ends with the group of women being taken to the police station and questioned by the interrogating police officer regarding Jenny's death.

=== The Interrogation Tapes ===
Over a month after the series ends, footage of Alice's police interrogation appeared on Showtime's L Word website ("The Interrogation Tapes"). In the footage, Alice explains to the interrogating police officers how she met Bette years ago, and how her own bisexuality still exists (even though she is more attracted to women). She then blurts out how she didn't understand what any of this line of questioning had to do with who killed Jenny, which prompts Sergeant Duffy to reply with a question of why Alice assumed the death was in fact a murder.

=== The Farm spin-off ===
A pilot for a proposed spin-off of The L Word entitled "The Farm", starring Leisha Hailey as Alice, was filmed. Substantially different from its parent show, the story revolved around Alice going to prison after being tried and convicted for Jenny's murder (a crime that Alice continued to deny committing) before later centering on the jail setting itself with an entire cast of new characters. It was announced in April, 2009 that Showtime had declined to pick up The Farm as a series.

=== The L Word: Generation Q ===
Over ten years after Jenny's death, Alice has relocated to Los Angeles and is the host of a new talk show, "Alice". It is also revealed that, under unknown circumstances, she ultimately broke up with Tasha, as she is shown to have settled down with therapist Nat Bailey, though she does not get on well with Nat's adopted children or with Gigi Ghorbani, Nat's meddling ex-wife and the children's biological mother. After Bette's campaign to become Mayor of Los Angeles is threatened when one of her previous sexual affairs is exposed, Alice invites Bette to appear on her talk show to tell her side of the story. Meanwhile, Alice becomes closer to Gigi and learns that Nat and Gigi's relationship ended when Gigi cheated on her around the same time Nat began a secret affair with Alice, and all of their mutual friends sided with Gigi and abandoned Nat. Feeling sympathetic, Alice suggests that Nat and Gigi spend more time together to renew their friendship, against Shane's advice, but Alice becomes jealous when Nat and Gigi start to enjoy each other's company and appear to snub her, fearing that Nat will betray her for Gigi as Dana betrayed her for Lara. At Shane's 40th birthday party, the three get drunk and end up having a threesome, but in the aftermath, Nat and Gigi find difficulties in overcoming their differences due to Gigi's previous infidelity and they enter a three-way relationship. However, Gigi continues to spite Nat at every opportunity, such as outing their status to strangers and kissing Alice before informing the children. Alice offers her support to Nat, who tells Alice she loves her and does not want to lose her. Meanwhile, Alice is informed that her show is approaching cancellation, and that same night, she returns home to find Nat and Gigi having sex without her. Distraught, Alice moves in with Shane for a few days until she finally answers Nat's calls for a lunch meeting. Nat and Gigi reveal to Alice that they have overcome their differences and that they want to continue being polyamorous, but when Alice discovers that Gigi has actually been living with Nat during those days and the two have been having sex frequently without her, she openly accuses Nat of only using her sexually for the past two years to get over her heartbreak from Gigi's infidelity, and angrily leaves. Alice later learns that her show will not be renewed, and goes against the producers' wishes and invites Roxane Gay on. During the interview, she reveals Nat and Gigi's betrayal, at which point Nat reveals herself in the audience and goes onto the stage to tell Alice that she loves her and has chosen her over Gigi, having discovered that Gigi was only out to destroy Alice and Nat's relationship out of spite. Alice forgives Nat and the video footage goes viral, saving the show.
