= Rachel Shelley =

English actress & model (born 1969)

- Born: 25 August 1969 (age 57); Swindon, Wiltshire, England
- Occupations: Actress, model
- Years active: 1994–present
- Height: 5 ft 8 in (1.73 m)
- Partner: Matthew Parkhill (1995–present)
- Children: 1

Rachel Shelley (born 25 August 1969) is an English actress, audio producer and model. She is best known for playing Helena Peabody in the Showtime series The L Word and Elizabeth Russell in the Oscar-nominated Bollywood epic Lagaan.

== Early life ==
Rachel Irene Shelley was born on 25 August 1969 in Wiltshire, England, United Kingdom, and was brought up primarily in Cambridgeshire. She is the youngest of four children. She has an older sister and two older brothers. Shelley spent three years in Malta as a child before attending school in Huntingdon. After graduating from the University of Sheffield with a B.A. Hons in English and Drama in 1992, she joined a local theatre company in Edinburgh and set up a community theatre company in Sheffield before moving to London to further her acting career.

== Career ==
Shelley is perhaps best known for playing Helena Peabody in the Showtime series The L Word. Other parts include Elizabeth Russell in the Oscar-nominated Hindi film Lagaan in 2001, a woman whose tragic loss drives Charles Castle mad in the 1997 film Photographing Fairies. In 2012 and early 2013, she played the recurring role of Yvonne Rippon, a police superintendent who had a relationship with established character Nick Jordan, in popular BBC medical drama Casualty. Shelley left the series on 19 January 2013. She played a pivotal role in the very first episode of the long-running ITV series Grantchester, opposite James Norton, and featured in the first series of the highly acclaimed Showtime series Episodes opposite Matt LeBlanc.

Apart from acting, Shelley has written articles for The Guardian, ELLE magazine, The Big Issue and DIVA Magazine. She was a columnist for several years for DIVA magazine. Shelley graduated from Goldsmiths University with an MA in Radio Production. She has produced and edited a documentary for BBC Radio 4 called What We've Learnt About Grief, presented by Cariad Lloyd. Shelley produced Rachel's Roving Reports for the weekly radio show Radio DIVA on Resonance for nearly three years, hosted by comedian Rosie Wilby and actress Heather Peace. She now produces the weekly LGBTQIA podcast podDIVA.

Shelley hosted the very first DIVA Awards in 2017, and went on to host two more times after this with co-host (actress) Victoria Broom.

== Awards ==
Shelley has been nominated several times for Ally of the Year at the DIVA Awards. In 2024 she was presented with a 30 Years of DIVA Honouree award for ally-ship throughout her career.

Shelley was awarded the IOWF Award for Best Actress in 2017 (Different for Girls) and jointly won the 2024 OTT Award for Best Ensemble Cast (Netflix series Kohrra).

She was also nominated for Best Supporting Actress at the 2002 Popular Awards for Lagaan and for Best Actress in a feature film at the Genre Blast Film Festival 2021 (Blank).

== Personal life ==
Shelley lives in Notting Hill, London, with her partner since 1995, Matthew Parkhill, who is a TV writer, director and producer. They have a daughter named Eden, born 8 September 2009.

== Filmography ==
Film
Year	Title	Role	Notes
1994	Broken Heart	Isabel	Short film
1997	Photographing Fairies	Mrs. Anne-Marie Castle	
1999	B.U.S.T.E.D	Clare	
1999	Lighthouse	Dr. Kirsty McCloud	
2000	Canone inverso - making love	Jeno's Mother	
2000	The Calling	Shelly Woodcock	
2001	Lagaan	Elizabeth Russell	Hindi film
2003	The Bone Snatcher	Mikki	
2004	Seeing Other People	Lauren	
2006	Gray Matters	Julia Barlett	
2008	The Children	Chloe	
2022	Blank	Claire Rivers	

=== Television ===
Television
Year	Title	Role	Notes
1994	Royce	Alana Maxwell	TV film
1997	The New Adventures of Robin Hood	Boadicea	Episode: "Heroes"; Episode: "The Birthday Trap"
1997	Wycliffe	Sarah	Episode: "Dance of the Scorpions"
1997	Bugs	Jenna Spinks	Episode: "Renegades"
1997	Highlander: The Series	Sophie Baines	Episode: "Avatar"
1998	The Bill	Maggie Hamilton	Episode: "For Your Love"
2001	Baddiel's Syndrome	Marcia	Episode: "Huffa"; Episode: "Hair Today"
2001	Jack and the Beanstalk: The Real Story	Harmonia	TV film
2002	Heartbeat	Sue Dixon, aka Denise Hurley	Episode: "Sympathy for the Devil"
2002	The American Embassy	Mandy	Episode: "Long Live the King"
2002	Coupling	Samantha	Episode: "Remember This"
2002	Cruise of the Gods	Yasmina	TV film
2002	The Dinosaur Hunters	Mary Mantell	TV film
2003	Sparkling Cyanide	Rosemary Barton	TV film
2003	Miss Match	Rebecca Hanley	Episode: "Something Nervy"
2004	Licensed by Royalty	Linda Kubrick	TV series
2005–2009	The L Word	Helena Peabody	54 episodes
2006	Ghost Whisperer	Kate Payne (uncredited)	Episode: "Cat's Claw"
2007–2008	Ghost Whisperer	Kate Payne	Episode: "Speed Demon"; Episode: "The Collector" Episode: "Deadbeat Dads"
2008	Under	Det. Underhill	TV film
2011	Episodes	Kendra	Episode: "Four"
2011	Strike Back	Maggie	Episode: "Project Dawn No. 5"; Episode: "Project Dawn No. 6"
2012–2013	Casualty	Supt Yvonne Rippon	Recurring, 2012–2013
2012–2016	Once Upon a Time	Milah	Episode: "The Crocodile"; Episode: "Manhattan"; Episode: "Devil's Due"
2013	Toast of London	Commander Scott-Gorham	Episode: "Submission"
2013–2014	Rogue	Shelley Morrison	Recurring
2014	Grantchester	Pamela Morton	Episode: "Episode 1"
2017–2018	Different for Girls	Brooke	Recurring
2018–2019	Deep State	Elliot Taylor	Recurring
2023	Kohrra	Clara Murphy	Indian TV series on Netflix
2025	Young Sherlock	Anna Tilcott	Recurring
