= Erin Daniels =

American actress

- Born: Erin Cohen; St. Louis, Missouri, U.S.
- Occupation: Actress
- Years active: 1996–present
- Spouse: Chris Uettwiller (m. 2009; div. 2019)
- Children: 2

Erin Daniels (née Cohen) is an American actress. She is best known for her role as Dana Fairbanks on The L Word (2004–2007). Her feature film work includes A Single Man (2009) and One Hour Photo (2002).

== Early life ==
Daniels was born and raised in St. Louis, Missouri, to a Jewish family. Her father is an architect, and her mother is a clinical social worker who co-founded the Central Reform Congregation in St. Louis. Her grandmother received an award from the National Conference of Christians and Jews. She attended Clayton High School and Vassar College, graduating from the latter in 1995 after majoring in art.

== Career ==
After Vassar, she moved to New York City, where she studied with William Esper, a protégé of Sanford Meisner, and worked off-Broadway. She then moved to Los Angeles for a part on the short-lived TV series Action.

In 2002, the St. Louis Film Festival awarded Daniels the Emerging Star Award. She appeared in One Hour Photo, Wheelmen, and House of 1000 Corpses before becoming a major cast member of Showtime's The L Word. Her depiction of Dana Fairbanks on that show prompted an anonymous donation of a million dollars to the Dr. Susan Love Research Foundation, an organization that promotes and funds breast cancer intraductal research. The death of Daniels' character from breast cancer was controversial, with creator Ilene Chaiken expressing that it is the one plot point in the series she regrets as "the audience never forgave me for it". Daniels reprised the role of Dana in reboot The L Word: Generation Q in a fantasy sequence

Soon after leaving The L Word, Daniels appeared on a pilot for a TV show called Julie Reno, Bounty Hunter. Daniels has also appeared in the TV shows Action, Jericho, Dexter, Saving Grace, Big Shots, Justice, CSI, and Swingtown.

She played the role of The Mother in Joshua Tree, 1951: A Portrait of James Dean. In a 2022 interview, Daniels stated that she is an acting coach, and that she is "pretty much a stay-at-home mom".

== Personal life ==
Daniels has children, and describes herself as a single parent.

== Filmography ==
Year	Film	Role	Notes
1998	USMA West Point	Christine Davis	Television film
1999	Flushed	Herself	as Erin Cohen
1999	Chill Factor	Medic #2	
2000	The Disciples	Lisa Johnson	Television film
2002	One Hour Photo	Maya Burson	
2003	House of 1000 Corpses	Denise Willis	
2005	Wheelmen	Gwen	
2009	A Single Man	Bank Teller	
2010	Starlight Inn	Katherine Sellwood	Short
2011	Few Options	Helen	
2011	The Sitter	Mrs. Pedulla	
2012	Like Father	Ali Miller	Television film
2012	Pull the Trigger, Mr. Wicker	Raphaella	Short
2012	Joshua Tree, 1951: A Portrait of James Dean	Roommate's Mother	
2013	The Bling Ring	Shannon	

== Television credits ==
Year	Title	Character	Notes
1996	Law & Order	Miss Stadler	Guest Appearance
1999	The Outer Limits	Barbara Chafey	Guest Appearance
1999	Action	Jenny	
2000	V.I.P.	Die Bodyguards	
2001	Jack & Jill	Becky Hart	
2001	Philly	Nicole Gilbert	
2003	Boomtown	Karen Crane	
2004-2007	The L Word	Dana Fairbanks	Main Character
2006	Julie Reno, Bounty Hunter	Julie Reno	Unaired Pilot
2006	Love Monkey	Dana	
2006	Dexter	Rita's Neighbour	
2006	Justice	Betsy Harrison	
2007	Jericho	Maggie	
2007	CSI: NY	Det. Brennan	
2007	Big Shots	Rebecca Parks	
2007	Saving Grace	Asst. D.A. Morgan Byer	
2008	Swingtown	Sylvia Davis	
2009	CSI: Crime Scene Investigation	Schuyler	
2011	Rizzoli & Isles	Kate	
2013	Maron	Female Vet	
2014	Perception	Dillon's Mother	
2015	Stalker	Lauren	
2020	The Bold Type	Mindy	
2022	The L Word: Generation Q	Dana Fairbanks	Guest Appearance
