= Nocturne (disambiguation) =

A nocturne is a musical composition inspired by, or evocative of, night.

Nocturne may also refer to:

== Art ==
- Nocturne (painting), a visual language
- Nocturne, an artwork on the Queen Elizabeth II Metro Bridge

== Film ==
- Nocturne (1946 film), an American film noir
- Nocturne (1966 film), a Soviet Latvian war film
- Nocturne, a 1980 short film by Lars von Trier
- Nocturne (2019 film), a Dutch drama film
- Nocturne (2020 film), an American film by Zu Quirke

== Music ==
- Nocturne (band), an American metal/industrial band

=== Classical compositions ===
- Nocturne (Britten), a song cycle by Benjamin Britten, 1958
- Nocturne (Lysenko), an opera by Mykola Lysenko, 1912
- Nocturne in E minor, Op. posth. 72 (Chopin), by Frédéric Chopin for solo piano, 1827
- Nocturne in C-sharp minor, Op. posth. (Chopin), by Frédéric Chopin for solo piano, 1830
- Nocturne in C minor, Op. posth. (Chopin), by Frédéric Chopin for solo piano, 1837
- Nocturne in B major (Dvořák), by Antonin Dvořák for string orchestra, 1883
- Nocturne for two voices and guitar H. 31, by Hector Berlioz, c. 1828
- Nocturne for piano, two pieces by Georges Bizet
- Nocturne for piano, 13 pieces by Gabriel Fauré

=== Albums ===
- Nocturne (Charlie Haden album), 2001
- Nocturne (The Human Abstract album) or the title song, 2006
- Nocturne (Oliver Nelson album) or the title song, 1961
- Nocturne (Wild Nothing album) or the title song, 2012
- Nocturne (Siouxsie and the Banshees album), 1983
- Nocturne (Yasōkyoku), by Wink, 1992
- Nocturne: The Piano Album, by Vangelis, 2019
- Nocturne (EP), by 2AM, 2013
- The Nocturne (EP), by NU'EST, 2020

=== Songs ===
- "Nocturne" (Secret Garden song), winner of Eurovision 1995
- "Nocturne" (Taube song), composed by Evert Taube, 1948
- "Nocturne", by Becoming the Archetype from The Physics of Fire, 2007
- "Nocturne", by Billy Joel from Cold Spring Harbor, 1971
- "Nocturne", by Daft Punk from the Tron: Legacy film soundtrack, 2010
- "Nocturne", by Insomnium from Since the Day It All Came Down, 2004
- "Nocturne: Lost Faith", by Invent Animate from Everchanger, 2014
- "Nocturne", by Itzy from Tunnel Vision, 2025
- "Nocturne", by Jay Chou from November's Chopin, 2005
- "Nocturne", by Medeski Martin & Wood from Combustication, 1998
- "Nocturne", by Misia from Marvelous, 2001
- "Nocturne", by Rush from Vapor Trails, 2002
- "Nocturne", by the Sword from Used Future, 2018
- "Nocturne", by T99 from Children of Chaos, 1992
- "Nocturne", by Tesseract from Altered State, 2013

== Television ==
=== Series ===
- Nocturne (TV series), a 2026 crime drama

=== Episodes ===
- "Nocturne" (Alias), 2005
- "Nocturne" (Endeavour), 2014
- "Nocturne" (Law & Order: Special Victims Unit), 2000
- "Nocturne" (Smallville), 2002

== Video games ==
- Nocturne (video game), a 1999 survival horror game for Windows
- Shin Megami Tensei III: Nocturne, a 2003 post-apocalyptic role-playing game for PlayStation 2
- Nocturne, a character in League of Legends.

== Other uses ==
- Dum Diane vitrea, a medieval poem also referred to as "Nocturne"
- Nocturne (audio drama), a 2007 Doctor Who audio play
- Nocturne (Talia Wagner), a Marvel Comics character
- London Nocturne, a bicycle race
- Henry Gray Turner House, or Nocturne, a historic house in Quitman, Georgia, US
- Nocturne (software), open-source software for Spotify Car Thing

== See also ==
- "Nocturn", a song by Kate Bush from Aerial, 2005
- Nocturn, a Danny Phantom character
- Nocturna (disambiguation)
- Nocturnes (disambiguation)
- Nocturno (disambiguation)
- Nocturns, a set of Christian prayers
- Notturno (disambiguation)
