= Nocturnes (disambiguation) =

Nocturnes are musical compositions inspired by, or evocative of, night.

Nocturnes may also refer to:

== Classical compositions ==
- Nocturnes (Chopin), 21 short pieces for piano
  - Nocturnes, Op. 9 (Chopin)
  - Nocturnes, Op. 15 (Chopin)
  - Nocturnes, Op. 27 (Chopin)
  - Nocturnes, Op. 32 (Chopin)
  - Nocturnes, Op. 37 (Chopin)
  - Nocturnes, Op. 48 (Chopin)
  - Nocturnes, Op. 55 (Chopin)
  - Nocturnes, Op. 62 (Chopin)
- Nocturnes (Debussy), a composition for orchestra by Claude Debussy
- Nocturnes (Field), 15 piano pieces by John Field
- Nocturnes (Satie), five piano pieces by Erik Satie

== Albums ==
- Nocturnes (Boxhead Ensemble album), 2006
- Nocturnes (Uh Huh Her album), 2011
- Nocturnes (Little Boots album), 2013
- Nocturnes (Angellore album), 2026

== Other ==
- Nocturnes (short story collection), short fiction by Kazuo Ishiguro

== See also ==
- Nocturne (disambiguation)
- Nocturns, Christian form of prayers
