= Nocturnes (Uh Huh Her album) =

Studio album by Uh Huh Her
- Released: October 11, 2011
- Genre: Indie rock, electropop, new wave
- Length: 40:09
- Label: Plaid Records

Uh Huh Her chronology
Common Reaction (2008)	Nocturnes (2011)	EP3 (2012)

Singles from Nocturnes
- 1. "Another Case" Released: September 27, 2011; 2. "Disdain" Released: January 2012; 3. "Wake To Sleep" Released: March 1, 2012; 4. "Human Nature" Released: April 17, 2012

Nocturnes is the second studio album from Uh Huh Her, which was released on October 11, 2011 worldwide. The album had four singles and music videos, "Another Case", "Disdain", "Wake To Sleep" and most recently, "Human Nature".

== Background and live performances ==
In September 2011, the band announced the release of the album for October 11. On September 15, the band broadcast a trailer of the album, which featured two songs - "Another Case" and "Same High".

The album is produced by and features Wendy Melvoin of Wendy & Lisa.

On January 9, the band was invited on Jimmy Kimmel's show to perform the songs "Marstorm" and "Disdain". The video gained 12,000 views in three days.

Meanwhile, a Nocturnes tour was planned all over America and in Europe in countries such as U.K, Netherlands, known as the Keep A Breast Tour to raise awareness, going from March 2011 to May 2012 with over 40 dates.

Camila Grey, the band's singer, states that the album's title refers to night and darkness, while Leisha Hailey explains that it's about things you work out when you're asleep.

== Release ==
Unlike Common Reaction, Nocturnes was written without the help of a manager and producer, with funds being raised money for the album by selling goodies, painting, and finally recorded the album "with no pressure" as Hailey says.

The release of Nocturnes was kicked off with a music video for the song Another Case. Music videos were also released for Wake To Sleep, Debris, and Human Nature.

== Re-release ==
Uh Huh Her plan to re-release Nocturnes on August 7, 2026, featuring two new songs.

== Media use ==
The song "Same High" appears on the soundtrack of the comedy-drama film The Kids Are All Right and the song "Time Stand Still" appears on the soundtrack of the TV show The Secret Circle.

== Track listing ==
1. "Marstorm" - 4:02
2. "Another Case" - 3:24
3. "Disdain" - 2:48
4. "Wake To Sleep" - 4:09
5. "Human Nature" - 4:28
6. "Many Colors" - 2:27
7. "Debris" - 2:45
8. "Criminal" - 4:13
9. "Same High" - 3:57
10. "Darkness Is" - 3:34
11. "Time Stands Still" - 4:11

== The Nocturnes Tour Dates ==
Date	City	Country	Venue
13 March 2011	Tucson	United States	Club Congress
14 March 2011	Albuquerque	United States	Albuquerque
16 March 2011	Houston	United States	Fitzgerald's
18 March 2011	Austin	United States	San Jose Hotel Parking Lot
19 March 2011	Austin	United States	Continental Club SXSW
19 March 2011	Dallas	United States	The Cambridge Room At House Of Blues
22 March 2011	Denver	United States	The Walnut Room
23 March 2011	Salt Lake City	United States	Urban Lounge
25 March 2011	Portland	United States	Wonder Ballroom
26 March 2011	Vancouver	Canada	Venue
26 March 2011	Vancouver	Canada	Venue
27 March 2011	Seattle	United States	Chop Suey
29 March 2011	San Francisco	United States	Great American Music Hall
31 March 2011	Solana Beach	United States	Belly Up Tavern
1 April 2011	Los Angeles	United States	El Rey Theatre
1 April 2011	Los Angeles	United States	El Rey Theatre
2 April 2011	Santa Barbara	United States	Velvet Jones
3 April 2011	Palm Springs	United States	Palm Springs Riviera Resort
17 April 2011	Phoenix	United States	Phoenix Pride / Steele Indian School
20 April 2011	Kansas City	United States	Conspiracy Room
21 April 2011	Minneapolis	United States	Varsity Theater
23 April 2011	Chicago	United States	Double Door
24 April 2011	Iowa City	United States	Blue Moose
25 April 2011	Newport	United States	The Southgate House
26 April 2011	Columbus	United States	The Basement
27 April 2011	Ferndale	United States	Magic Bag
29 April 2011	Montreal	Canada	Le National
30 April 2011	Toronto	United States	Mod Club
2 May 2011	Washington, D.C.	United States	9:30 Club
3 May 2011	Pittsburgh	United States	Mr. Smalls
5 May 2011	New York	United States	Santos Party House
6 May 2011	Philadelphia	United States	World Café Live
7 May 2011	Boston	United States	Brighton Music Hall
8 May 2011	Northampton	United States	Pearl Street Nightclub
11 May 2011	Charlotte	United States	Visulite Theatre
13 May 2011	Fort Lauderdale	United States	Culture Room
14 May 2011	Saint Petersburg	United States	State Theatre
15 May 2011	Orlando	United States	Social
17 May 2011	Atlanta	United States	Loft
17 May 2011	Nashville	United States	Exit / In
18 May 2011	Kent	United Kingdom	Go Go Festival
19 May 2011	St. Louis	United States	Blueberry Hill
20 July 2011	Las Vegas	United States	The Cosmopolitan
21 July 2011	Las Vegas	United States	The Cosmopolitan
22 July 2011	Las Vegas	United States	The Cosmopolitan
23 July 2011	Las Vegas	United States	The Cosmopolitan
25 July 2011	Sacramento	United States	Harlows Restaurant & Night Club
27 July 2011	Sparks, Nevada	United States	The Alley
28 July 2011	Chico	United States	The El Rey Theatre- Chico
29 July 2011	San Luis Obispo	United States	SLO Brew
28 August 2011	Los Angeles	United States	Bootleg Bar
8 October 2011	Philadelphia	United States	Theatre of Living Arts
10 October 2011	New York	United States	Irving Plaza
11 October 2011	Boston	United States	Paradise Rock Club
12 October 2011	Washington, D.C.	United States	9:30 Club
14 October 2011	Toronto	Canada	Theatre Corona
15 October 2011	Toronto	Canada	Phoenix Concert Theatre
16 October 2011	Cleveland	United States	House of Blues Cleveland
18 October 2011	Detroit	United States	The shelter
19 October 2011	Chicago	United States	House of Blues Chicago
21 October 2011	Atlanta	United States	Vinyl
23 October 2011	New Orleans	United States	House of Blues New Orleans
24 October 2011	Houston	United States	Fitzgerald's Houston
25 October 2011	Austin	United States	Antone's
26 October 2011	Dallas	United States	House Of Blues Dallas
28 October 2011	Denver	United States	Larimer Lounge
30 October 2011	Salt Lake City	United States	Urban Lounge
1 November 2011	Los Angeles	United States	House Of Blues Los Angeles
2 November 2011	San Francisco	United States	Slim's
4 November 2011	Seattle	United States	Crocodile Back Bar
5 November 2011	Vancouver	Canada	Venue
6 November 2011	Portland	United States	Wonder Ballroom
26 March 2012	Gainesville	United States	The University of Florida Reitz Union Hotel

== The Nocturnes European Tour Dates ==
Date	City	Country	Venue
13 April 2012	Amsterdam	Netherlands	Paradiso
15 April 2012	Cologne	Germany	Köln
16 April 2012	Berlin	Germany	Magnet
18 April 2012	Brighton	United Kingdom	Concorde 2
