= Future Souls =

2014 album by Uh Huh Her

Studio album by Uh Huh Her
- Released: March 25, 2014
- Recorded: 2013
- Genre: Electropop, techno
- Label: Plaid Records

Uh Huh Her chronology
EP3 (2012)	Future Souls (2014)

Singles from Future souls
- 1. "Innocence" Released: February 4, 2014; 2. "It's Chemical" Released: March 4, 2014

Future Souls is the third studio album from American band Uh Huh Her. Released on March 25, 2014 worldwide and shipped out March 24, the album features dance influences and an electropop background. Two singles from the album were released: "Innocence" on February 4, 2014, and "It's Chemical" on March 4, 2014.

== Background ==
Like its predecessor Nocturnes, Future Souls was recorded independently. The band also opted for a more dance-oriented sound. Production began in 2013 when Grey and Hailey decided to start recording in their home.

When asked how they have evolved as artists, Grey offers an insightful perspective. “I think it’s about the art of letting go. Not having preconceived expectations of what is going to come out of you. I think for me personally it was a really fluid process. I tried to have a lot more fun with the making of this record. We wanted to go back to our more electronic roots. We went back to the more crispy electronic vibe.” “We set out to make a dance record,” said Hailey. Camila Grey also stated they got co-writers, such as Che Pope for "Nuthin Without Your Love" for the album as well.

== Track listing ==
1. "Innocence"
2. "It's Chemical"
3. "Time"
4. "Shiiine"
5. "Bullet"
6. "Strange Design"
7. "Nuthin Without Your Love"
8. "Fine Lines White Lies"
9. "Hustle Me"
10. "Interconnect"

== Personnel ==
- Vocals: Camila Grey and Leisha Hailey
- Bass: Camila Grey
- Guitars: Camila Grey & Tommy Joe Ratliff on "Nuthin Without Your Love"
- Drum/synth programming: Camila Grey & Leisha Hailey
- Live drums: Josh Kane

== Production ==
- Production was handled by Camila Grey and Leisha Hailey, with engineering done by Jaime Sickora. Mixed by Jaime Sickora, Paul LaMalfa and Jeff Rothschild, and mastered by John Gilbertson.
- Studio assistant to Jaime Sickora: Joshua Simmons & Derrick Stockwell
- Album artwork by Xavier Schipani
- Digital artwork design: Allyce Engelson
- Recorded at Henson Recording Studios and Deep Valley Sound.
