= The Murmurs (album) =

Studio album by the Murmurs
- Released: 1994
- Genre: Folk-pop
- Length: 41:55
- Label: MCA
- Producer: Roger Greenawalt, Billy Basinski

The Murmurs chronology
Who We Are (1991)	The Murmurs (1994)	Pristine Smut (1997)

The Murmurs is an album by the American musical duo the Murmurs, released in 1994. The duo supported the album with a North American tour that included shows with Joe Jackson. "You Suck" was a minor hit.

== Production ==
The album was produced primarily by Roger Greenawalt and Billy Basinski. The songs were built around the duo's acoustic guitar playing; many songs added instruments such as flute and oboe. "You Suck" is an autobiographical song about an early advisor who swindled the duo. Two songs, "Basically" and "Beautiful Peace", are about the duo's mothers.

== Critical reception ==
Professional ratings
Review scores
Source	Rating
AllMusic	4/5 stars
The Indianapolis Star	3.5/4 stars
Knoxville News Sentinel	3/5 stars
MusicHound Rock: The Essential Album Guide	2/5 stars

The Advocate deemed the album "an unfunny caricature of Woodstock-era folk music at its most amateurish," writing that "once again, as with k.d. lang, Melissa Etheridge and the Indigo Girls, we get a whitewashing of sexual desire." The Sun-Sentinel wrote that "the Murmurs sing of sad days wasting time, first loves and nights filled with dreams... Instrumentation is spare and light, allowing the fragile murmurs to rise into real voices." The Chicago Tribune concluded that "these two obnoxious, petulant, fluorescent-haired young women have turned whining into an art form."

The Record determined that "any folky feel is belied by the record's slick production and bland rhythm section." The Indianapolis Star praised the "fresh voices carrying twentysomething poetry with all its youthful certainty tempered by questions." The Washington Post labeled the album "blandly sweet," writing that "a spoonful of sugar is fine, but too much honey can yield a concoction as cloying as The Murmurs."

AllMusic called The Murmurs "an album full of lovely, literate, acoustic-based alt pop."

== Track listing ==
No.	Title	Length
1.	"Bad Mood"	4:01
2.	"Basically"	4:06
3.	"Wastin Time"	3:17
4.	"Mission"	2:52
5.	"Carry Me Home"	3:44
6.	"Untouchable"	2:36
7.	"You Suck"	3:16
8.	"Neverending"	4:25
9.	"Ticket to Zen"	2:51
10.	"Bumble Bees"	3:38
11.	"All I Need to Know"	3:11
12.	"Beautiful Peace"	3:58
