= Pristine Smut =

Studio album by the Murmurs
- Released: June 24, 1997
- Recorded: 1997
- Studio: Capitol, Hollywood, California; Mushroom Vancouver, British Columbia, Canada; Placebo, Vancouver, British Columbia, Canada
- Genre: Alternative pop
- Label: MCA
- Producer: Larry Klein k.d. lang Matthew Wilder

The Murmurs chronology
The Murmurs (1994)	Pristine Smut (1997)	Blender (1998)

Pristine Smut is an album released by American alternative pop band the Murmurs; it was released on June 24, 1997, by MCA. The album was produced by Larry Klein and k.d. lang and all tracks on the album were written by the Murmurs members Heather Grody and Leisha Hailey.

== Recording ==
The album's co-producer k.d. lang had started dating band member Leisha Hailey in 1996, a year before the album was recorded. In a 2000 interview, Lang reflected "We [didn't] want to get involved in each other's art [...] My producing of the Murmurs was just to help them out because I had a studio and they needed tracks done. And it was fun for me because I always wanted to produce a girl group like that." Its working title was The Ballad of Pristine Smut.

The track "Sleepless Commotion" was written by Heather Grody, about the murder of her mother, who was killed by her husband in 1993.

== Release, reception and legacy ==
The album was poorly promoted by the band's label, MCA Records, who were going through staff changes at the time.

In a review for Allmusic, Stephen Thomas Erlewine gave Pristine Smut a star rating of four out of five. He noted that the album had a rhythm section added to the "folk pop" of its predecessor, 1994's Murmurs. He praised producers Klein and Lang for steering the band towards "adult alternative rock" but said that the sound was "clean and pristine ... shined and polished and now ready for radio". He said, however, that the songs on Pristine Smut were stronger than those of the previous album.

Robert Christgau gave the album an A− rating and praised it as an improvement on their previous album. He said of Pristine Smut, "not since Liz Phair's "Flower", Janet's "Throb", and Madonna's Erotica has pop softcore attended so sweetly to the erogenous zones." In a review for The Advocate, Barry Walters also noted the "rockin' rhythm section" of the second album. He described the tracks produced by Lang as "punk[y]" and "Nirvana-esque" and the ones produced by Klein as "like Suzanne Vega before dance beats discovered her".

It was nominated for an award for Album of the Year at the Gay & Lesbian American Music Awards in 1998. The track "Squeezebox Days" featured on the soundtrack to the 1997 film All Over Me. In 2005, "Big Talker" was also included in an episode of the Fox drama The O.C., titled "The Mallpisode".

== Track listing ==
1. "Big Talker"
2. "I'm a Mess"
3. "Toy"
4. "Underdog"
5. "About Nothin'"
6. "Genius"
7. "Squeeze Box Days"
8. "Don't Lie"
9. "Sucker Upper"
10. "Country Song"
11. "Sleepless Commotion"

== Personnel ==
Music

- Teddy Borowiecki — keyboards
- Heather Grody — guitar, electric guitar, vocals
- Leisha Hailey — guitar, vocals
- Larry Klein — bass, electric guitar, Hammond organ
- Greg Leisz — mandolin, pedal steel
- Jerry Marotta — drums
- Ben Mink — guitar, strings
- Sheri Ozeki — bass
- Sherri Solinger — drums

Production

- Larry Klein — arranger, producer
- k.d. lang — producer
- Ben Mink — arranger
- Tony Phillips — engineer, mixing
- Marc Ramaer — engineer
- Skip Saylor — engineer, mixing
- Eddy Schreyer — mastering

Design

- Todd Gallopo — art direction, design
- Dave Jensen — photography
- Tim Stedman — art direction, design
