= I See Red (EP) =

EP by Uh Huh Her
- Released: July 24, 2007
- Recorded: 2007
- Genres: Electropop, indie rock
- Label: Plaid Records

Uh Huh Her chronology
I See Red (2007)	Common Reaction (2008)

I See Red is the debut extended play by indie band Uh Huh Her. I See Red was released on July 24. 2007, on Plaid Records.

== Background ==
Leisha Hailey, having been absent from the music industry since the dissolution of her former band The Murmurs, ran into Camila Grey, who was a member of Mellowdrone, at a paintball game in 2006 and had decided to form a band. Alicia Warrington had originally been the third member but left the group early on.

Two tracks on I See Red were later re-released on their debut album Common Reaction; "Say So", first recorded with Hailey as the lead vocalist and the only recording with Alicia Warrington, and "Explode".

== Critical reception ==
In a mixed review, Popmatters states "...The bright and sunny electropop on their debut EP I See Red reminds of Kosheen, though it's not as radio-single-ready...... single “Say So”, here in two versions, doesn't show the group's full potential, though: catchy enough for a TV theme or commercial, it's lacking the irresistible hook of a chorus that would make the group a household name..."

== Track listing ==
1. "Explode" – 2:55
2. "Run" – 4:12
3. "I See Red" – 4:18
4. "Say So" 3:24
5. "Say So" (Thom Russo mix) – 3:46
6. "Mystery Lights" (bonus track) – 4:15
