= I See Red =

I See Red may refer to:

- I See Red (EP), by Uh Huh Her, 2007
- "I See Red" (Jim Rafferty song), originally recorded by Frida (Anni-Frid Lyngstad), 1982; covered by Clannad, 1983
- "I See Red" (Split Enz song), 1978
- "I See Red", a song by Everybody Loves an Outlaw from the 365 Days film soundtrack, 2020
- "I See Red", a song by X from More Fun in the New World, 1983
- "I See Red", a video game by Whiteboard Games, 2022
