= Alicia Warrington =

American drummer (born 1980)

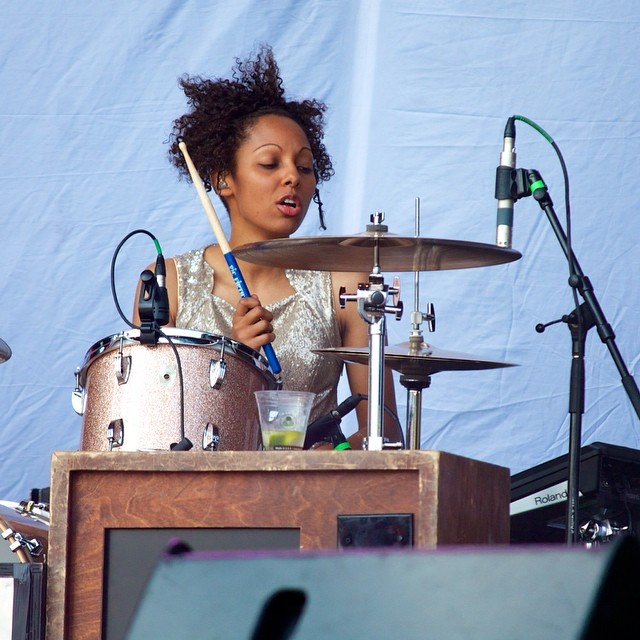
- Warrington performing at Lollapalooza 2014
- Born: August 30, 1980 (age 46); Saginaw, Michigan, U.S.
- Other name: Alicia Taylor
- Occupations: Drummer; ring announcer
- Years active: 1992–present
- Musical career
- Genres: Pop; alternative rock; indie rock; rock; R&B; hip hop; country

Alicia Warrington (born August 30, 1980) is an American drummer and professional wrestling ring announcer. She has played drums for Kate Nash, Kelly Osbourne, Lillix, Hannah Montana, Uh Huh Her, Gore Gore Girls, Dawn Robinson, The All-Girl Boys Choir, The Dollyrots, The Bruises, Tracy Chapman, Selena Gomez, Colton Dixon, Chris Rene and others. Under the professional wrestling ring name Alicia Taylor, she is the current ring announcer for WWE Raw.

== Early life ==
Growing up in Saginaw, Michigan, Alicia Warrington wanted to either be a musician or a professional wrestler. "My mom started taking me to wrestling matches when I was four years old," Alicia says. "Most kids wanted to go to the circus – I wanted to go to wrestling matches. I even had all the action figures."

Warrington was raised in a single-parent home and grew up listening to music from all different genres. "I grew up with my grandparents playing Polka music in the house, my mom always had the R&B and classic rock (Anita Baker to The Beatles), my sister was getting Ozzy tapes banned from our house and my uncle was pushing Queensrÿche, Dokken and Quiet Riot at me. I love MUSIC. Period. If it's good, I'm going to listen to it, I'm going to play it and I'm going to be influenced by it—in one way or another. I grew up listening to absolutely everything and today, you will find [just that] in my collection. I like everything from En Vogue to Lamb of God."

Around 11 years old, Warrington taught herself how to play drums on her uncle's drum set by watching and listening to other drummers. She learned songs by playing along to cassette tapes of her favorite bands. As a teen, Warrington performed in metal and punk bands in Michigan and began touring at the age of 15. After 2 years of college, Warrington packed up her car and moved by herself to Los Angeles.

== Music career ==
Warrington got her big break in 2002, when she replaced Kelly Osbourne's drummer on MTV hit reality show, "The Osbournes". Warrington performed on numerous award shows and television programs with Osbourne, as well as toured in over 11 countries, with bandmates Devin Bronson, Josh Paul and Mat Dauzat. She also appeared on Kelly's 2003 album Changes as well as a DVD, Kelly Osbourne: Live at the Electric Ballroom.

Warrington followed up that success drumming for Canadian pop artists Lillix, Disney's mega-hit series Hannah Montana, Selena Gomez, Dawn Robinson of 90's Funky Divas En Vogue, Uh Huh Her with Leisha Hailey, Gore Gore Girls, Colton Dixon from American Idol and as of March 2012, The X Factor's Chris Rene.

In 2015, she started her own band Dohrn.

== Professional wrestling career ==
In December 2018, Warrington signed with professional wrestling promotion WWE and started working for the NXT brand under the ring name Alicia Taylor as the host of the post-show. From the April 25, 2019, episode of the NXT, she became the ring announcer of the show. She continued to announce for NXT until the May 7, 2024, episode as three days later, she took on the role as SmackDown ring announcer. On January 6, 2025, episode of Raw, Taylor became the ring announcer of the show.

== Endorsements/setup ==
Warrington is endorsed by Ludwig Drums, Paiste Cymbals, Aquarian Drumheads, Vic Firth Sticks and daBeat.

Ludwig Maple
12" Rack Tom
18" Floor Tom
22" Kick Drum
6x14" Hammered Brass Snare
6x10" Epic Side Snare

Paiste Cymbals
14" Twenty Custom Collection Full Hats
18" Alpha Thin Swiss Crash
19" Signature Full Crash
20" 2002 Crash
22" Twenty Custom Collection Ride or 22" Signature Blue Bell Ride (Alternate)

Aquarian Drumheads
Coated Hi-Velocity (main snare), Coated Studio-X (side snare), Coated Response 2 (toms), Impact 3 or Super Kick 2 (kick).

Vic Firth Sticks
Gavin Harrison Signature or American Classic Rock

== Discography ==
Warrington has largely featured on:

DOHRN – Levels Of Hate (Single 2015)
DOHRN – Becoming The Disease (Single 2015)
Light FM – Voices in My Head (2013)
The Dollyrots – One Big Happy (2012)
The Dollyrots – Have A Crappy Summer (2012)
The All-Girl Boys Choir – electric. (2011)
The All-Girl Boys Choir – Walking Miracles (2009)
Uh Huh Her – I See Red (2007)

Kelly Osbourne: Live at the Electric Ballroom (2004) DVD
The Bruises – Ladies and Gentlemen...The Bruises! (2004)
Kelly Mantle – Starstruck Obsession (2004)
Kelly Osbourne – Changes (2003)
The Otterpops – Earth Science Club (2001)
Fudgegun – Behind Closed Doors (1998)
Fudgegun – If You Could See My Office (1997)
Dropping the Messiah – Knowledge For Its Own Sake (1995)
Purgatory – Ripping Your Mind Apart (1994)
