= Piano Concerto in A-flat major =

Piano Concerto in A-flat major may refer to:

- Piano Concerto No. 8 (Ries)
- Piano Concerto No. 2 (Field)
- Piano Concerto No. 3 (Ohzawa)
