= John Field (composer) =

Irish composer (1782–1837)

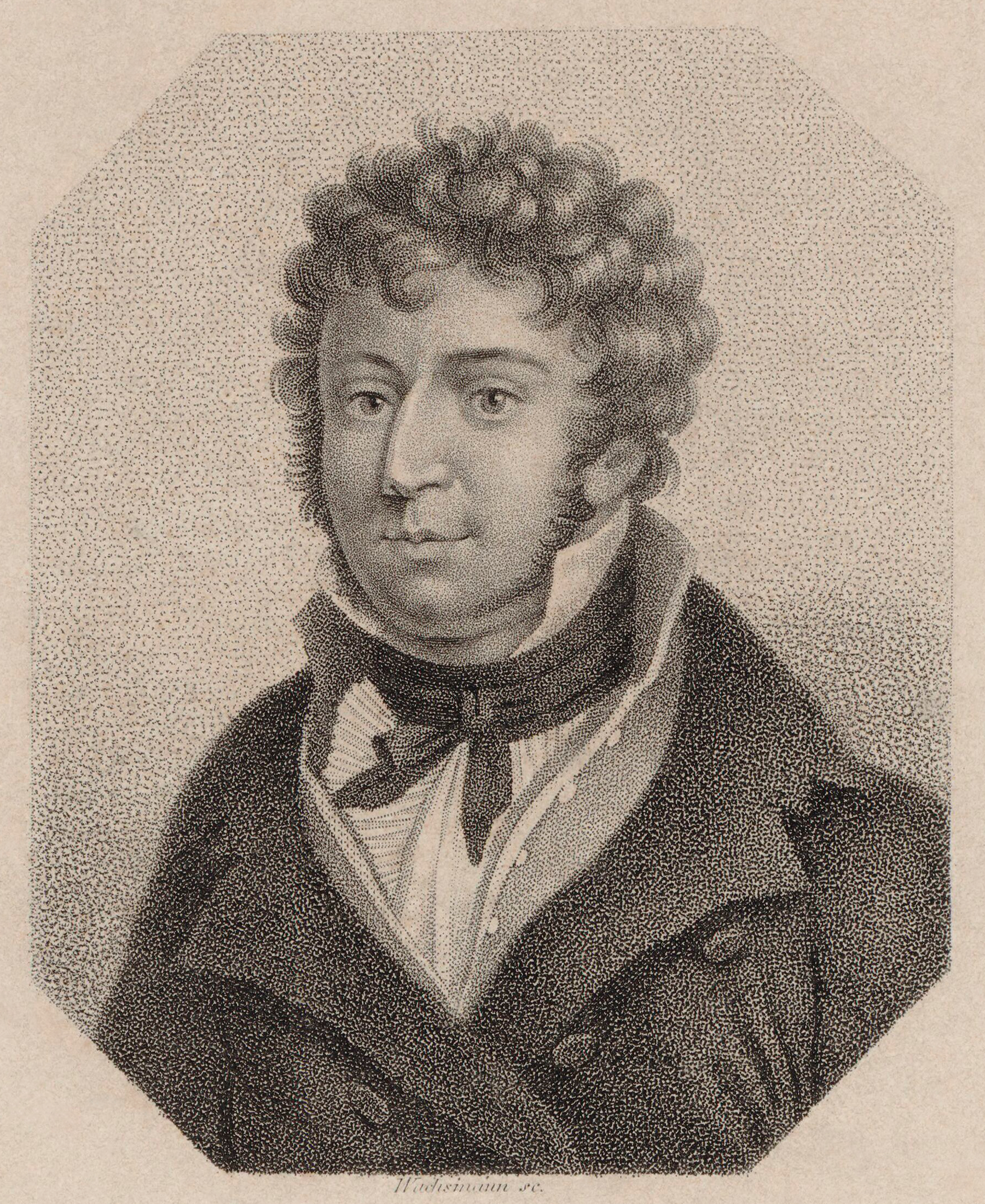
- Engraving by Anton Wachsmann, c. 1820
- Born: 26 July 1782; Dublin, Ireland
- Died: 23 January 1837 (aged 54); Moscow, Russia
- Occupations: Composer; pianist; teacher
- Known for: Inventing the nocturne

John Field (26 July 1782 – 23 January 1837) was an Irish pianist and composer. He is widely credited as the inventor of the nocturne. While many of his contemporaries wrote in a similar style, Field was the first to use the term to apply to a character piece featuring a cantabile melody over an arpeggiated accompaniment.

Born into a musical family in Dublin, he received his early education in the city, particularly with Tommaso Giordani. The family moved to London in 1793 where, under the tutelage of Muzio Clementi, Field soon became a famous and sought-after concert pianist. Together, they visited Paris, Vienna, and Saint Petersburg. Ambiguity surrounds Field's decision to remain in the latter, but it is likely that Field acted as a sales representative for Clementi & Co.

Field was very highly regarded by his contemporaries and his playing and compositions influenced many major composers, including Felix Mendelssohn, Frédéric Chopin, Johannes Brahms, Robert Schumann, and Franz Liszt. Although little is known of Field's time in Russia, he undoubtedly contributed substantially to concerts and teaching, and to the development of the Russian piano school.

Amongst his students were Charles Mayer, Alexandre Dubuque, and Antoine de Kontski.

== Biography ==
=== 1782–1801: Early life ===
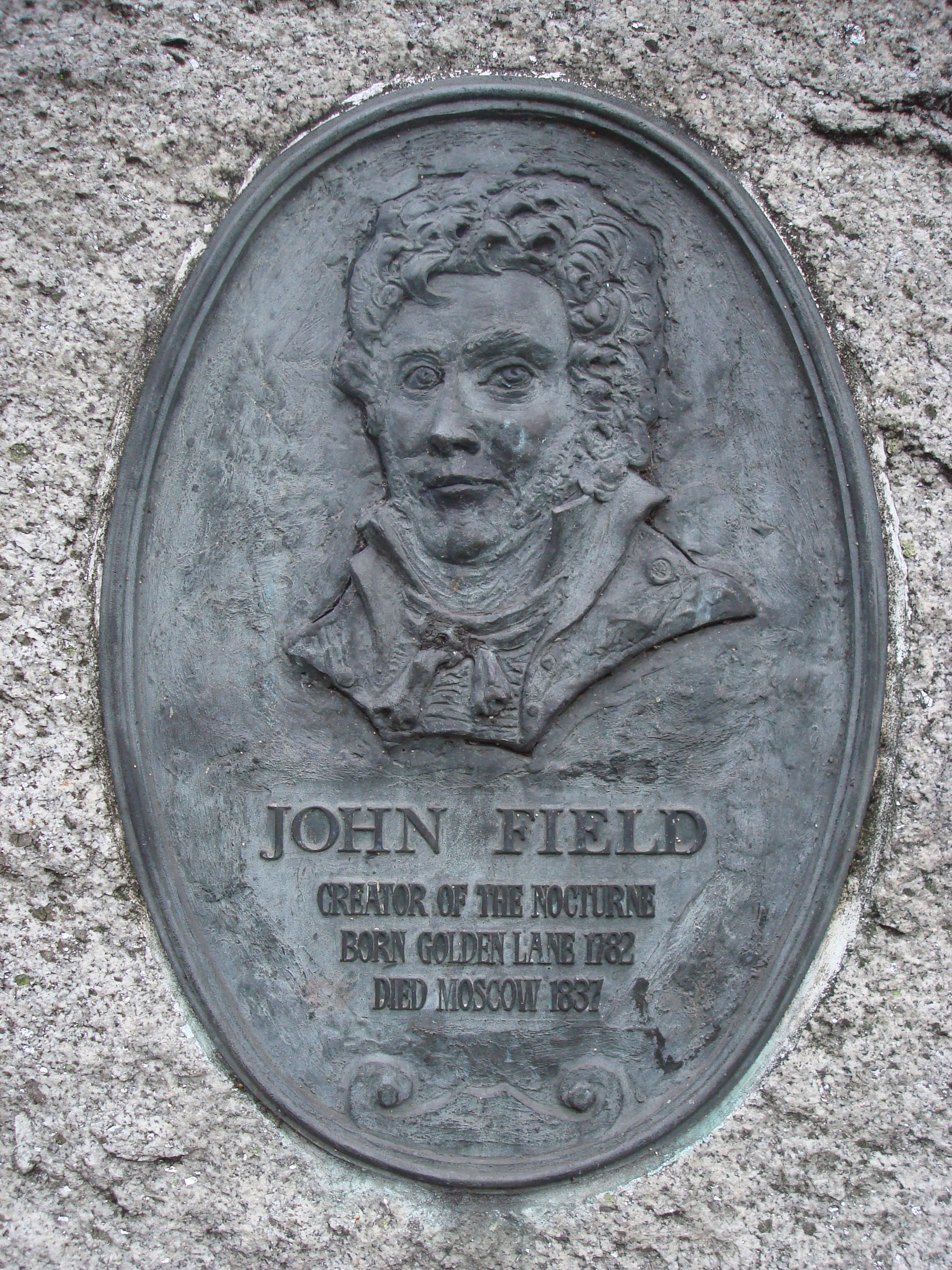
A plaque commemorating Field in Golden Lane, Dublin

Field was born 26 July 1782 in Golden Lane, Dublin, the eldest son of Irish parents who were members of the Church of Ireland. He was baptised on 30 September. His father, Robert Field, earned his living by playing the violin in Dublin theatres. Field first studied the piano under his grandfather (also named John Field), who was a professional organist, and later under Tommaso Giordani. He made his debut at the age of nine, a performance that was well-received, on 24 March 1792 in Dublin. According to an early biographer, W. H. Grattan Flood, Field started composing in Ireland, but no evidence exists to support his claim. Flood also asserted that Field's family moved to Bath, Somerset, in 1793 and lived there for a short time, and this too is considered unlikely by modern researchers. By late 1793, though, the Fields had settled in London, where the young pianist started studying with Muzio Clementi. This arrangement was made possible by Field's father, who was perhaps able to secure the apprenticeship through Giordani, who knew Clementi.

Field continued giving public performances and soon became famous in London, attracting favourable comments from the press and the local musicians. Around 1795 his performance of a Dussek piano concerto was praised by Haydn. Field continued his studies with Clementi, also helping the Italian with the making and selling of instruments. He also took up violin playing, which he studied under J. P. Solomon. His first published compositions were issued by Clementi in 1795; the first historically important work, Piano Concerto No. 1, H 27, was premiered by the composer in London on 7 February 1799, when he was aged 16. Field's first official opus was a set of three piano sonatas published by (and dedicated to) Clementi in 1801.

=== 1802–1829: Settling in Russia ===
In summer 1802 Field and Clementi left London and went to Paris on business. They soon travelled to Vienna, where Field took a brief course in counterpoint under Johann Georg Albrechtsberger and had meetings with both Haydn and Beethoven, the latter whom Field played for in October, and Beethoven highly praised him. In early winter he arrived in Saint Petersburg. Field was inclined to stay, impressed by the artistic life of the city. Clementi left in June 1803, but not before securing Field a teaching post in Narva and "appointing" the young man as his deputy, so that Field would receive similarly high fees. After Clementi's departure, Field had a busy concert season, eventually performing at the newly founded Saint Petersburg Philharmonic Society. In 1805 Field embarked on a concert tour of the Baltic states, staying in Saint Petersburg during the summer. The following year he gave his first concert in Moscow. Clementi arranged the publication of some of Field's old works in Russia in late 1806; he evidently sold Field a piano in exchange for music. Field returned to Moscow in April 1807 and apparently did not revisit Saint Petersburg until 1811 (but he kept his apartment at Vasilievsky Island). In 1810 he married Adelaide Percheron, a French pianist and former pupil.

Up to 1808, almost all publications of Field's music were reissues of old works. In 1808–9 he finally began publishing newly composed music, starting with piano variations on Russian folksongs: Air russe varié for piano 4 hands, H 10, and Kamarinskaya for piano, H 22. In 1811 the composer returned to Saint Petersburg. He spent the next decade of his life here, more productive than ever before, publishing numerous new pieces and producing corrected editions of old ones. He was successful in establishing a fruitful collaboration with both H. J. Dalmas, the most prominent Russian publisher of the time, and Breitkopf & Härtel, one of the most important music publishing houses of Europe. In 1815 Field fathered an illegitimate son, Leon Charpentier (later Leon Leonov), but remained with his wife. They had a son, Adrien, in 1819; Leon would later become a famous tenor, active in Russia, while Adrien followed his father's steps and became a pianist. By 1819 Field was sufficiently wealthy to be able to refuse the position of court pianist that was offered to him. His lifestyle and social behaviour were becoming more and more extravagant.

In 1818 Field revisited Moscow on business, prompted by his collaboration with the publisher Wenzel. He and his wife gave a series of concerts in the city in 1821, the last of which marked their last appearance in public together. Adelaide left Field soon afterwards (taking Adrien with her) and attempted a solo career, which was not particularly successful. Field stayed in Moscow and continued performing and publishing his music. In 1822 he met Johann Nepomuk Hummel; the two collaborated on a performance of Hummel's Sonata for Piano 4-Hands, Op. 92.

=== 1830–1837: Last years and death ===
Partly as a result of his extravagant lifestyle, Field's health began deteriorating by the mid-1820s. From about 1823 his concert appearances started decreasing; by the late 1820s he was suffering from rectal cancer. Field left for London to seek medical attention. He arrived in September 1831 and, after an operation, gave concerts there and in Manchester. He stayed in England for some time, meeting distinguished figures such as Mendelssohn and Moscheles. In March 1832 his former teacher and friend Clementi died, and Field served as pallbearer at his funeral. On Christmas Day 1832 Field was in Paris, performing his 7th Piano Concerto, which received a mixed reaction, just as at his recent concerts in England. After a series of concerts in various European cities, Field spent nine months (1834–5) in a Naples hospital. His Russian patrons rescued him. He briefly stayed with Carl Czerny in Vienna, where he gave three recitals, and then returned to Moscow with his son Adrien. He gave his last concert in March 1836 and died in Moscow almost a year later, on 23 January 1837, from pneumonia. He was buried in Vvedenskoye Cemetery. According to an eyewitness report, when asked on his deathbed what his religion was, Field replied with a characteristic pun: "I am not a Calvinist, but a Claveciniste (French for harpsichordist)."

== Music ==
None have quite attained to these vague eolian harmonies, these half-formed sighs floating through the air, softly lamenting and dissolved in delicious melancholy. Nobody has even attempted this peculiar style, and especially none of those who heard Field play himself, or rather who heard him dream his music in moments when he entirely abandoned himself to his inspiration.
– Franz Liszt's preface to his edition of Field's nocturnes, 1859. (English translation by Julius Schuberth, 1859)

Field became well known for his post-London style, probably developed in Moscow around 1807. The characteristic texture is that of a chromatically decorated melody over sonorous left-hand parts supported by sensitive pedalling. Field also had an affinity for ostinato patterns and pedal points, rather unusual for the prevailing styles of the day. Entirely representative of these traits are Field's 18 nocturnes and associated pieces such as Andante inedit, H 64. These works were some of the most influential music of the early Romantic period: they do not adhere to a strict formal scheme (such as the sonata form), and they create a mood without text or programme. These pieces were admired by Frédéric Chopin, who subsequently made the piano nocturne famous, and Franz Liszt, who published an edition of the nocturnes based on rare Russian sources that incorporated late revisions by Field. Liszt's preface to the said edition was an extensive eulogy for Field and his nocturnes.

Field, Nocturne H.37 in B♭ major
Performed by Constantin Stephan

Field also gave a few lessons to the young Mikhail Glinka, who was to become the first notable Russian composer.

Similarly influential were Field's early piano concertos, which occupied a central place in the development of the genre in the 19th century. Already the earliest of these works show competent and imaginative orchestration, and bold, original piano writing. One interesting trait of his piano concertos is their limited choice of keys: they all use either E♭ major or C major at some point (or both, in the last concerto's case). Composers such as Hummel, Kalkbrenner, Mendelssohn and Moscheles were influenced by these works, which are particularly notable for their central movements, frequently nocturne-like. Some of the less-known works were also historically important: particularly the piano fantasies, in which Field pioneered the Romantic large-scale episodic structure.

None of his piano sonatas, and only two of his seven piano concertos, have a formal slow movement. In performance, Field would interpolate an existing nocturne in a related key or improvise one.

== List of works ==
This list is arranged according to Hopkinson numbers, introduced in the 1961 catalogue by Cecil Hopkinson. Many of these works were arranged for other instruments and/or revised by the composer himself; such arrangements and revised versions are not listed.

Number	Opus	Form	Title	Key	Notes	Refs	Year
H 1	–	Variation	on "Fal Lal La" for piano	A major	?	?	
H 2	–	Rondo	"Favorite Hornpipe" for piano	A major	?	?	
H 3	–	Rondo	"Go the devil" for piano	C major	?	?	
H 4	–	Variation	on "Since then I'm doom'd" for piano	C major	?	?	
H 5	–	Rondo	"Slave, bear the sparkling goblet" for piano	G major	(Note: Manuscript lost)	?	
H 6	–	Rondo	"The two slaves dances" for piano	G major	?	?	
H 7	–	Variation	on "Logie of Buchan" for piano	C major	?	?	
H 8	Op. 1	Sonata	Piano Sonata No. 1	E♭ major	?	?	P 1801
H 8	Op. 1	Sonata	Piano Sonata No. 2	A major	?	?	P 1801
H 8	Op. 1	Sonata	Piano Sonata No. 3	C minor	?	?	P 1801
H 9	–	Concertante	"Pleyel's" for piano, violin & cello	F major	?	?	
H 10	–	Variation	"Air russe" for piano 4 hands	A minor	?	?	
H 11	–	–	Andante for piano 4 hands	C minor	?	?	
H 12	–	–	"Danse des ours" for piano 4 hands	E♭ major	?	?	
H 13	–	Nocturne	for piano (12)	E major	?	?	
H 14	–	Divertissement	No. 2 for piano	A major	?	?	
H 14	–	Nocturne	for piano (7)	A major	?	?	
H 15	Op. 3	Fantasia	on "Guardami un poco" for piano	A major	?	?	
H 16	–	Marche triomphale	for piano	E♭ major	?	?	
H 17	–	Sonata	for piano	B major	?	?	P 1812
H 18	–	Rondeau	for piano	A♭ major	?	?	
H 18	–	Waltz	for piano	A♭ major	?	?	
H 19	–	Grande valse	for piano 4 hands	A major	?	?	
H 20	–	Variation	on "Vive Henry IV" for piano	A minor	?	?	
H 21	–	Polonaise	for piano	E♭ major	?	?	
H 22	–	Variation	on "Kamarinskaya" for piano	B♭ major	?	?	
H 23	–	Rondo	"Speed the Plough" for piano	B major	?	?	
H 24	–	Nocturne	No. 1 for piano	E♭ major	?	?	P 1814
H 25	–	Nocturne	No. 2 for piano	C minor	?	?	P 1814
H 26	–	Nocturne	No. 3 for piano	A♭ major	?	?	P 1814
H 27	–	Piano Concerto	No. 1	E♭ major	(Note: 1799)	?	
H 27	–	Rondo	from Piano Concerto No. 1	E♭ major	(Note: 1799)	?	
H 27	–	Variation	on "Within a mile" for piano	B♭ major	(Note: 1799)	?	
H 28	–	Piano Concerto	No. 4	E♭ major	(Note: 1814, revised in 1819)	?	
H 28	–	Rondo	from Piano Concerto No. 4	E♭ major	(Note: 1814, revised in 1819)	?	
H 29	–	Rondo	from Piano Concerto No. 3	E♭ major	?	?	
H 30	–	Nocturne	No. 9 (8) for piano	E♭ major	?	?	
H 31	–	Piano Concerto	No. 2	A♭ major	?	?	
H 31	–	Poco adagio	from Piano Concerto No. 2	E♭ major	?	?	
H 31	–	Rondo	from Piano Concerto No. 2	A♭ major	?	?	
H 32	–	Piano Concerto	No. 3	E♭ major	(Note: 1811)	?	
H 33	–	Étude	"Exercice modulé sur tous les tons majeurs et mineurs" for piano	–	?	?	
H 34	–	Piano quintet	–	A♭ major	?	?	
H 35	–	Fantasia	on "Ah! quel dommage" for piano	G major	?	?	
H 36	–	Nocturne	No. 4 for piano	A major	?	?	P 1817
H 37	–	Nocturne	No. 5 for piano	B♭ major	?	?	P 1817
H 38	–	Rondo	for piano	A major	?	?	
H 39	–	Piano Concerto	No. 5 "L'incendie par l'orage"	C major	(Note: 1817)	?	
H 39	–	Rondo	from Piano Concerto No. 5	C major	(Note: 1817)	?	
H 40	–	Nocturne	No. 6 for piano	F major	?	?	
H 41	–	Variation	on a Russian folksong for piano	D minor	?	?	
H 42	–	6 Dances	for piano	–	?	?	
H 43	–	Rondo	for piano 4 hands	G major	?	?	
H 44	–	Étude	"Exercice nouveau" No. 1 for piano	C major	?	?	
H 45	–	Nocturne	No. 7 (13) for piano	C major	?	?	
H 46	–	Nocturne	No. 8 (9) for piano	E minor	?	?	
H 47	–	–	"The Maid of Valdarno"	–	(Note: Manuscript lost)	?	
H 48	–	–	"Exercice nouveau" No. 2 for piano	C major	?	?	
H 49	–	Piano Concerto	No. 6	C major	(Note: 1819, revised in 1820)	?	
H 49	–	Rondo	No. 6 from Piano Concerto	C major	?	?	
H 50	–	–	2 Songs	–	?	?	
H 51	–	Waltz	"Sehnsuchts-Walzer" for piano	E major	?	?	
H 52	–	Rondoletto	for piano	E♭ major	?	?	
H 53	–	Rondo	"Come again, come again" for piano	E major	?	?	
H 54	–	Nocturne	No. 10 for piano	E minor	?	?	
H 55	–	Nocturne	"Le troubadour" for piano	C major	?	?	
H 56	–	Nocturne	No. 11 for piano	E♭ major	?	?	
H 57	–	Fantasia	on "We met" for piano	G major	?	?	
H 58	–	Nocturne	No. 12 (14) for piano	G major	(Note: 1822, revised in 1822–32)	?	
H 58	–	Piano Concerto	No. 7	C minor	(Note: 1822, revised in 1822–32)	?	
H 59	–	Nocturne	No. 13 (15) for piano	D minor	?	?	
H 60	–	Nocturne	No. 14 (16) for piano	C major	?	?	
H 61	–	Nocturne	No. 15 (17) for piano	C major	?	?	
H 62	–	Nocturne	No. 16 (18) for piano	F major	?	?	
H 63	–	Nocturne	– for piano	B♭ major	?	?	
H 64	–	Andante inedit	for piano	E♭ major	?	?	
H 65	–	Pastorale	for piano	–	(Note: Manuscript lost)	?	
H 66	–	Nocturne	"Dernière pensée" for piano	–	(Note: Manuscript lost)	?	
H 67	–	–	"88 passages doigtés" for piano	–	(Note: Manuscript lost)	?	
H deest	–	Étude	"Exercice" for piano	A♭ major	?	?	
H deest	–	Fantasia	on "Dans le jardin" for piano	A minor	?	?	
H deest	–	Largo	for piano	C minor	?	?	
H deest	–	Prelude	for piano	C minor	?	?	
H deest	–	Nocturne	No. 17 for piano	E♭ major	?	?	

== Ephemera ==
In the Dublin suburb of Walkinstown there is a road called Field Avenue, one of a number of so-called 'musical roads' named after prominent Irish musicians.

He is mentioned in passing in War and Peace when Countess Rostova calls on the Rostov household musician to play her favourite nocturne.

Also, in Tolstoy's Childhood, Field is said to have taught the narrator's mother to play: "Mamma was playing Field's second concerto. Field had been her master." (Everyman Library, trans. C. J. Hogarth.)

Field is mentioned in Poshekhonskaya Antiquity by Saltykov-Shchedrin. [Салтыков-Щедрин, М.Е. Пошехонская Старина. --М: Правда, 1980.]

"Она у Фильда уроки берет. Дорогонек этот Фильд, по золотенькому за час платим, но за то . . . " [Знаменитый в то время композитор-пианист, родом англичанин, поселившийся и состарившийся в Москве. Под конец жизни он давал уроки только у себя на дому и одинаково к ученикам и ученицам выходил в халате. (Прим. М Е. Салтыкова-Щедрина)]

She takes lessons from Field. That Field is expensive, we pay a gold piece an hour, but for that... [A famous composer-pianist at the time, an Englishman by birth, who had settled and grew old in Moscow. Toward the end of his life he gave lessons only in his home and went to his pupils, male or female alike, in his housecoat. Author's note.]

Field and his wife Adelaide Percheron are the protagonists of the novel Music Against the Night by Yiyun Li, published in 2026 by Farrar, Straus & Giroux.

== See also ==
- Nocturnes (Field)

== Bibliography ==
- "Фильд, Джон" . Brockhaus and Efron Encyclopedic Dictionary (in Russian). 1906.
- Boland, Majella (2013). John Field in Context: a Reappraisal of the Nocturne and Piano Concerti (PhD Dissertation, University College Dublin.
- Horton, Julian (2011). "John Field and the Alternative History of Concerto First-Movement Form", in Music and Letters, vol. 92, no. 1.
- Piggott, Patrick (1973). The Life and Music of John Field, 1782–1837, Creator of the Nocturne. London: Faber and Faber.
