= Notturno =

Notturno is the Italian word for nocturne. It may refer to:

== Film ==
- Tango notturno, a 1937 German film
- Notturno (film), a 2020 Italian-French-German documentary

== Music ==
- Euroclassic Notturno, classical music recordings assembled by BBC Radio used in overnight classical-music schedules
- Notturno, Op. 42, for viola and piano, by Beethoven; see List of compositions by Ludwig van Beethoven
- "Notturno" for string quartet (1993), see List of compositions by Luciano Berio
- "Notturno", Op. 8, for flute, violin, viola, cello, piano and two horns, by Prince Louis Ferdinand of Prussia (1772–1806)
- "Notturno", several pieces; see List of compositions by Ottorino Respighi
- Notturno (Schoeck), a 1933 song cycle for baritone and string quartet by Othmar Schoeck
- Notturno (Schubert), an 1827 composition for piano trio by Franz Schubert
- Notturno (Strauss), an 1899 song for low voice and orchestra by Richard Strauss
- Notturno Concertante, an Italian neo-progressive rock band established in 1984
- Torneo notturno, a 1931 opera by Italian composer Gian Francesco Malipiero
- "Notturno", the third movement of String Quartet No. 2 (Borodin); the origin of the melody of "And This Is My Beloved" from the 1953 musical Kismet

== See also ==
- Nocturne (disambiguation)
