= Blender (The Murmurs album) =

Studio album (reissue) by the Murmurs
- Released: August 4, 1998
- Recorded: 1997–1998
- Genre: Alternative pop
- Length: 33:37
- Label: MCA
- Producer: Larry Klein k.d. lang Matthew Wilder

The Murmurs chronology
Pristine Smut (1997)	Blender (1998)

Blender is the reissue of the second studio album by American alternative pop band the Murmurs, Pristine Smut (1997). It was released on August 4, 1998, on MCA. The album was produced by Larry Klein, k.d. lang and Matthew Wilder. Blender primarily consists of tracks from their second album Pristine Smut, originally released in June 1997. One of them, "I'm a Mess", was remixed; additionally, three new songs written around the time of Pristine Smut's release are included. All of the tracks were written by band members Leisha Hailey and Heather Grody. One, "Smash", was co-written with members of rock band the Go-Go's, Jane Wiedlin and Charlotte Caffey.

== Reception ==
In a review for Allmusic, Alex Henderson gave Blender a star rating of four out of five, calling it "power-pop heaven". Henderson compared the sound of the album to that The Go-Go's and praised "Underdog", "Sucker Upper" and "La Di Da" in particular as "first-class ... fun, melodic offerings". Robert Christgau gave the album a B− rating and compared it negatively to its predecessor, Pristine Smut. He criticized the band's "pusillanimity", and said "they were cuter with slime on their pudenda".

Kentucky paper Daily News wrote in 1998, "MCA Records is giving The Murmurs a rare second chance to score with Pristine Smut. If any album deserves another shot, it's this superb, but overlooked, 1997 release by the duo of Heather Grody and Leisha Hailey. And The Murmurs have made their release all the more tempting; they've replaced three throwaway tracks with three vital new songs, and they've overhauled one of the better cuts from the original, revamping "I'm a Mess" into a beefier rendition with tougher lead vocals and melodic countervocals." They also commented, "Grody and Hailey themselves have been made over. Their glossy new look adorns the Blender cover — more inviting than the goofy retro matron on the cover of Pristine Smut and more flattering than the candid snapshot of the duo on the back of the previous release."

In 2011, Pride.com ranked it 35th on their list of "The 100 Greatest Lesbian Albums of All Time".

== Track listing ==
1. "La Di Da" — 2:57
2. "I'm a Mess" — 3:13
3. "Big Talker" — 2:58
4. "Misfit" — 4:03
5. "Smash" — 2:35
6. "Genius" — 3:42
7. "Don't Lie" — 2:56
8. "Underdog" — 2:56
9. "Sucker Upper" — 3:00
10. "Country Song" — 2:28
11. "About Nothin'" — 2:49

== Personnel ==
Music

- Gregg Arreguin — guitar
- Teddy Borowiecki — keyboards
- Heather Grody — composer
- Leisha Hailey — composer
- Larry Klein — bass
- Abe Laboriel, Jr. — drums
- Greg Leisz — mandolin, pedal steel
- Jerry Marotta — drums, Native American drums
- Ben Mink — guitar
- The Murmurs — ensemble, guitar, vocals
- Sheri Ozeki — bass
- Sherri Solinger — drums
- Matthew Wilder — harmonium, keyboards, Hammond organ, synthesizer

Production

- Phil Kaffel — engineer, mixing
- Larry Klein — producer
- k.d. lang — producer
- Tony Phillips — engineer, mixing
- Marc Ramaer — engineer
- Skip Saylor — engineer, mixing
- Eddy Schreyer — mastering
- Matthew Wilder — producer, programming

Design

- Christy Bush — photography
- Danny Flynn — stylist
- Kenny J. Gravillis — art direction, design
- Russell A. Robinson — design
