= Dead Ant =

- Directed by: Ron Carlson
- Written by: Ron Carlson
- Produced by: Andrew Harwood
- Starring: Tom Arnold; Sean Astin; Rhys Coiro; Jake Busey; Leisha Hailey
- Cinematography: Marc Carter
- Edited by: Eric Wing
- Music by: Edwin Wendler
- Production companies: August Heart Films; Arctic Zebra Pictures
- Distributed by: Cinedigm
- Release dates: 10 October 2017 (Screamfest Horror Film Festival); 25 January 2019 (US)
- Running time: 90 minutes
- Country: United States
- Language: English

Dead Ant (also titled Giant Killer Ants) is a 2017 American comedy horror film directed by Ron Carlson, starring Tom Arnold, Sean Astin, Rhys Coiro, Jake Busey, and Leisha Hailey.

== Plot ==
The members of a heavy metal band have a chance to return to stardom when they are invited to Coachella. However, they get stranded in the desert and find themselves fighting for their lives against giant ants.

== Cast ==
- Tom Arnold as Danny
- Sean Astin as Art
- Rhys Coiro as Pager
- Jake Busey as Merrick
- Leisha Hailey as Stevie
- Michael Horse as "Bigfoot"
- Danny Woodburn as "Firecracker"
- Cameron Richardson as "Love"
- Sydney Sweeney as Samantha "Sam"
- Joi Liaye as Lisa
- Cortney Palm as Candy
- Tristan Lake Leabu as Festival Victim
- Shevyn Roberts as Rock Star (uncredited)

== Release ==
The film opened in limited theatres and was released to VOD on 25 January 2019.

== Reception ==
On the review aggregator website Rotten Tomatoes, 69% of 13 critics' reviews are positive, with an average rating of 5.6/10. Metacritic, which uses a weighted average, assigned the film a score of 48 out of 100, based on 4 critics, indicating "mixed or average" reviews.

Frank Scheck of The Hollywood Reporter called the film "the sort of effort that wears its cult movie aspirations so heavily on its sleeve that it they should bring back drive-in theaters to show it."

Noel Murray of the Los Angeles Times wrote that Carlson "does swiftly and skillfully move the story toward a surprisingly spectacular finish", while the cast "look like they're all having a ball", and called the film "unapologetically “low art” ... yet fun, in its own way."

Bobby LePire of Film Threat gave the film a score of 7/10 and wrote that while the film is "not quite the slam dunk it could be", that does not "deter from the sheer fun and energy of the production."

Nick Spacek of Starburst gave the film a score of 6/10 and wrote that the film's real appeal is "when the entirety of the cast and crew do their level best to make a solid film, despite budgetary limitations, rather than making excuses or shrugging things off."
