= Nocturne (software) =

Open-source software for Spotify's Car Thing

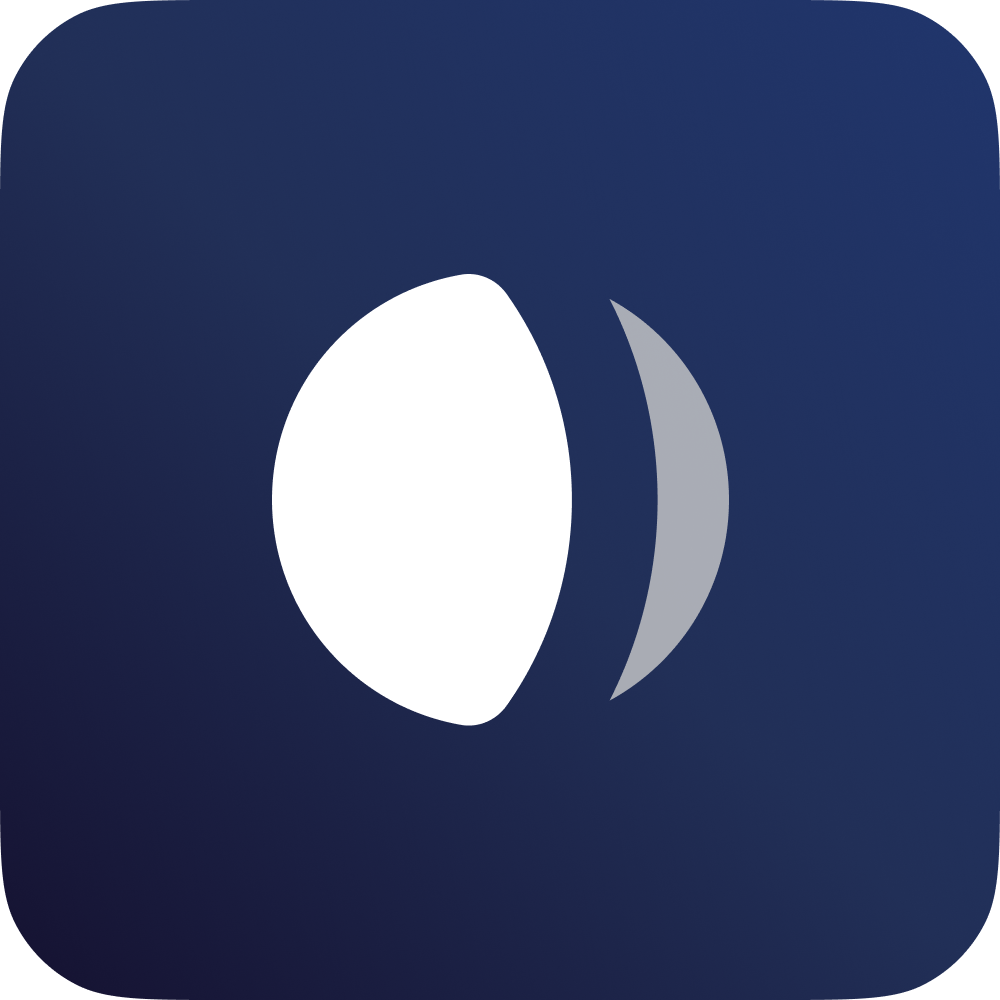

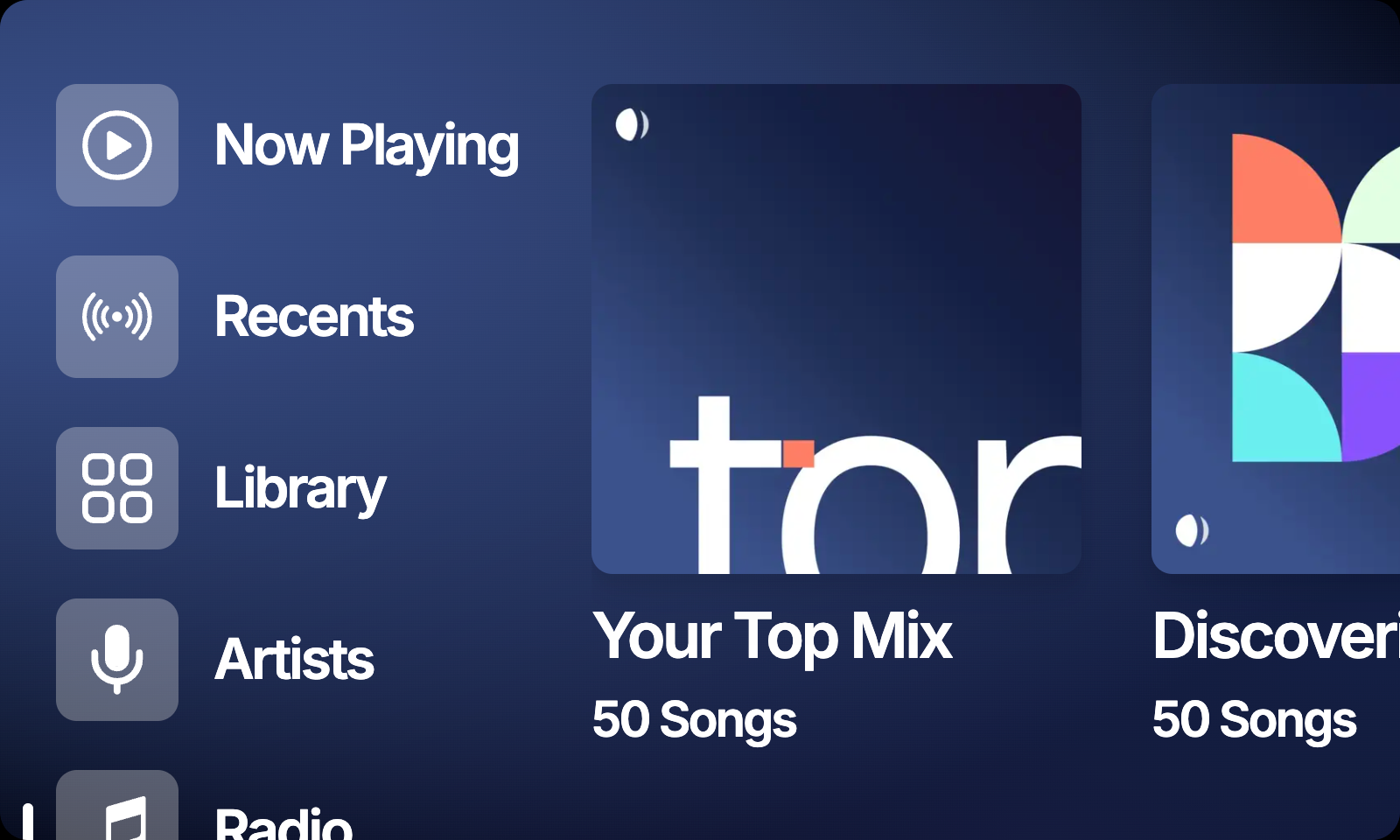
- Developers: Brandon Saldan, Neel Patel, Dominic Frye
- Release: 8 October 2024; 2 years ago
- Stable release: 4.1.9 / 28 October 2026; 0 days ago
- Written in: Rust, TypeScript
- Operating system: Linux
- Platform: ARM Cortex-A53
- Type: System software
- License: GNU General Public License version 3 (firmware); proprietary (companion app)
- Website: usenocturne.com
- Repository: github.com/usenocturne/nocturne

Nocturne is an open-source software project designed to extend the functionality of Spotify's discontinued Car Thing device.

== Background ==
Spotify released the Car Thing in 2021 as a dashboard-mounted device to control its music streaming service, but ended production of the device in July 2022, attributing the decision to limited consumer demand and supply chain issues. Spotify officially discontinued support for the Car Thing on December 9, 2024, effectively rendering the device non-functional.

== Software ==
The on-device software is developed as an open-source initiative, allowing contributors to participate in the project. While Nocturne enables the device to regain functionality, it runs on the Car Thing's limited hardware, which includes 512 MB of RAM, 4 GB of internal storage, and an Amlogic S905D2 SoC; the device cannot access the internet independently. On initial release, users were required to pair the Car Thing with a host device, such as a Raspberry Pi, to overcome these limitations and provide network access. Version 3.0.0 added software support for Bluetooth tethering, removing the requirement for a Raspberry Pi.

Version 4.0.0 discontinued support for Bluetooth tethering in favor of a companion app that communicates with the Car Thing over Bluetooth due to reported issues with Bluetooth tethering usability in version 3.0.0, although support for use with Raspberry Pi devices remains. The release also introduced Mockingbird, an optional recreation of the original Car Thing's user interface, including its screens, navigation, and controls. It is available alongside Nocturne's standard interface, and users can switch between the two in the device settings.

Nocturne functions either in vehicles, similar to the Car Thing's original use, or as a desktop music controller. The software offers features such as full playback controls, playlist management, real-time interface updates, and artist and album exploration. Spotify library features require a Spotify Premium account, but the software can display and control audio playing on a paired phone, including audio from apps other than Spotify, without a Spotify login.

== Companion App ==
The companion app is used by the Nocturne software as a method of communicating with mobile devices. It is available on both iOS and Android, requiring iOS 16.2 or later and Android 12 or later, respectively. The companion app originally required a subscription to use, but following user feedback, a lifetime purchase option was later introduced as an alternative to the subscription requirement.

== See also ==
- Hacking of consumer electronics
