= Vo sadu li, v ogorode =

Song
- Language: Russian
- Published: Traditional
- Genre: Russian folk music
- Composer: Unknown

"Vo sadu li, v ogorode" (Russian: Во саду ли, в огороде; English translation: In the grove or in the garden) is a Russian folk song. It is likely one of a number of songs formerly used to encourage crops in Spring. Various verses are written to parsley, corn, potatoes, and sunflowers, which are personified. It is, because of its simplicity, usually the first melody learned by balalaika students, but balalaika/mixed folk instrument ensembles embellish it considerably. Played as an instrumental, it usually accompanies a solo male dancer.

John Field composed a piece titled Fantaisie sur un air favorit...avec accompagnement de l'orchestre based upon this song. According to the Library of Congress Citations entry for this, it was published as a piano solo by Wenzel, Moscow, ca. 1823.
