= Uh Huh Her (band) =

American pop/rock band

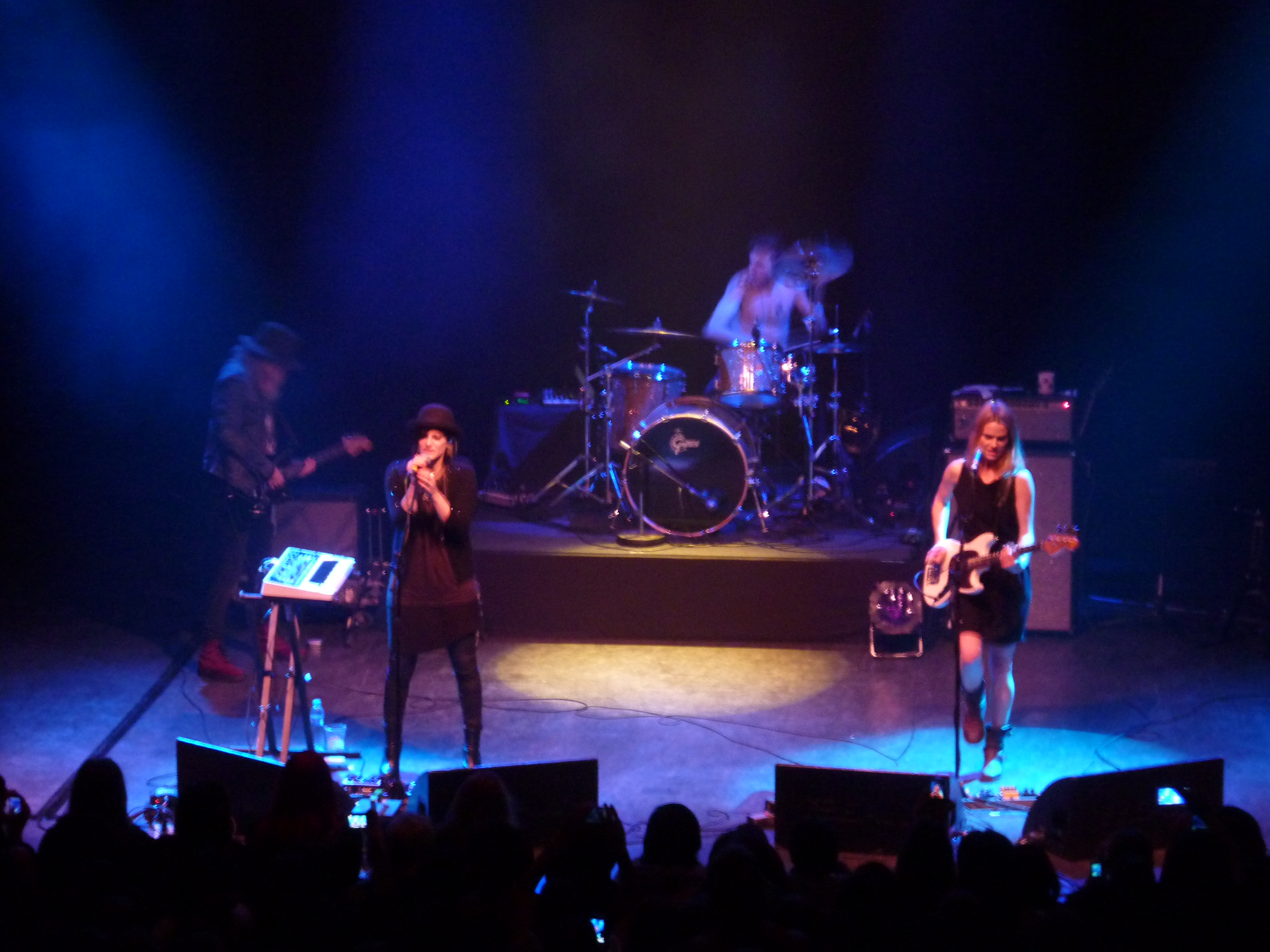
- Uh Huh Her performing at Shepherd's Bush Empire in London, April 2012

Background information
- Origin: Los Angeles, California, U.S.
- Genres: Indie pop; indie rock; new wave; synthpop; indietronica
- Years active: 2006–2014
- Labels: Plaid Records (former); Nettwerk (former)
- Past members: Leisha Hailey; Camila Grey; Alicia Warrington

Uh Huh Her is an American indie/rock/electropop band that was formed in January 2006. The band's name came from an album by artist PJ Harvey, titled Uh Huh Her.

== Background ==
Camila Grey (lead vocals, guitar, keyboard), former member of the lo-fi rock band Mellowdrone, had not released any solo material prior to joining Uh Huh Her; however, she had played bass and keyboards for a variety of artists, such as Dr. Dre, Melissa Auf der Maur, Busta Rhymes, and Kelly Osbourne. She was also a member of Adam Lambert's live band (keyboardist).

Leisha Hailey (backing vocals, bass, keyboard), formerly of The Murmurs and Gush, had temporarily left the music business to join the cast of Showtime's series The L Word as the character Alice Pieszecki, with the band forming during filming of the final seasons of the show.

Originally, drummer Alicia Warrington had been Uh Huh Her's third member; however, she separated from the group early on. Uh Huh Her is generally still regarded as a duo, with the only official members being Camila Grey and Leisha Hailey despite both being opened to evolving.

The band members considered changing their name to UHH (pronunciation "U-H-H"), as opposed to the full "Uh Huh Her", believing the original name looked good in written form, but was awkward to pronounce.

== Biography ==
=== 2006–2009: I See Red and Common Reaction ===
The band formed in 2006, when Camilia Grey and Leisha Hailey met at a paint ball game. The band recorded their first project I See Red EP, released on July 24, 2007, in Camila Grey's house.

I See Red includes a version of the song "Say So", the first song the band wrote together, in which Hailey sang lead vocals (the later release of the song had Grey singing lead). I See Red was initially released digitally with limited amounts of hard copies, with a bonus track available on hard copies and on iTunes.

Uh Huh Her's debut album Common Reaction was released on August 19, 2008, after a delay. Both "Explode" and "Say So" were released for a second time on the full-length album as both members felt the songs deserved to be more polished.

Common Reaction, which was recorded in Westside Pacific Studio, charted at number 9 on the Billboard Top Heatseekers.

Uh Huh Her was dropped from Nettwerk in 2009, with Camilia Grey stating that they still owe them money.

=== 2010–2012: label change, new music, and touring ===
Since making the switch to an independent label, a lack of funding (and Grey's tour with Adam Lambert) put a halt on the immediate release of the second full-length album. To fill the gap between albums, the band released their second EP, Black and Blue on April 19, 2011. The release fell just prior to the band's second major tour, so that they would have new material for fans to purchase. They also headlined at the SXSW Music Festival. The entire six-track EP was recorded and produced in under two weeks.

Nocturnes, Uh Huh Her's second studio album, was eventually released on October 11, 2011. Grey wrote "Human Nature", "Wake To Sleep" and "Darkness Is" independently ("Darkness Is" was originally titled "Never Absolute") while Hailey wrote "Debris" on her own, and she has said on several occasions that the song is about phone sex. "Wake To Sleep" was written about the process of making the album, and refers to the differing sleeping habits of the band members. "Criminal" was written about the band's experience splitting with their former record label and managers. Uh Huh Her made their first TV appearance when they appeared on Jimmy Kimmel.

The third EP was released on December 11, 2012, and as a cdr exclusively sold through Amazon, and features reworked, acoustic versions of "Debris", "I See Red", "Black and Blue", "Not a Love Song", "Common Reaction", and "Philosophy," with Camila Grey stating ".....The EP is different because it was recorded with the intention of being acoustic. We essentially took old songs and revamped them and recorded some live, some with a full band, and some with just a piano and vocal. Its unique because we're known for being really electro, and in this case it's the opposite, very organic and pared down." In this version of "Debris", Grey sings lead vocals (as opposed to Hailey, who wrote the song).

=== 2013–2014: Future Souls ===
In 2013, Camilia and Leisha moved their record studio into their home, with Leisha saying "We didn't have to rush ourselves with any sort of deadlines. Everything was created within these four walls."

On January 20, 2014, the band started accepting pre-orders for a new album called Future Souls available on March 25, 2014, with the cover being designed by Zavier Schipani. The lead single, titled "Innocence", was made available on iTunes on February 4, 2014. The second single, "It's Chemical", was made available on March 4, 2014. Future Souls was released on iTunes and other digital providers on March 25, 2014. The band will be touring in support of the album from April 27 through the end of June, across the US and Canada.

=== 2015–present ===
In 2016, Camilia Grey and Leisha Hailey decided to take a break from Uh Huh Her, stating ".....We decided after our "Future Souls" tour to take time off to pursue other endeavors. You could officially say we are on a "hiatus" of sorts. We feel like we needed to take this break to bring some new magic into our music and give our other loves some attention...Leisha has been back to acting, Camila has joined another indie band called "Summer Moon" and is working on many solo side projects and DJing and Josh is currently a Zen Buddha Yogi Master teaching others the art of meditation and mindfulness in addition to being the best drummer ever......"

Uh Huh Her also recently signed with Kill Rock Stars and is planning to re-release their 2011 album Nocturnes on vinyl.

== Other media ==
The songs "Same High" and "Human Nature" were both originally written for films (The Kids Are All Right and Twilight, respectively... although "Human Nature" was not included in the Twilight movie).

Uh Huh Her appeared uncredited as performers in Awkward and Privileged while the song "Same High" appeared in the movie Breaking the Girls.

"No Sacrifice" and "Time Stands Still" were featured on the American television show The Secret Circle. "Say So" was featured on the soundtrack to the 2009 movie Hotel for Dogs.

In 2017, their song "Explode" was featured in The Carmilla Movie, based on the web series of the same name.

== Tours ==
Common Reaction tour: The first major tour was from October 17, 2008, until November 18, 2008, after the release of Common Reaction. The tour consisted of 19 tour dates, mostly in the US, with a few shows in Canada and one in the UK.

Black and Blue tour: The second major tour (commonly referred to as the "Black and Blue Tour" or "B&B Tour") went from March 14, 2011, until May 19, 2011. This tour included 39 shows across the US and Canada.

Keep a Breast tour: The third major tour was in association with the Keep A Breast Foundation (and is appropriately referred to as the "Keep A Breast Tour" or "KAB Tour"). It featured 21 tour dates in the US and Canada, from October 8, 2011, until November 6, 2011.

European tour: The fourth major tour took place from April 13–24, 2012, and included 10 tour dates across Europe. It has sometimes been referred to as the "UK Tour", despite several shows in the Netherlands/Germany. Unlike previous tours, the European tour did not feature a lead guitarist, and they also chose to perform several songs acoustically.

Future Souls tour: The fifth major tour took place from April 27, 2014, until July 2, 2014. It consisted of 45 tour dates in the US and Canada. This tour featured DJ Kim Anh as an opening act.

== Discography ==
=== Albums ===
- Common Reaction (2008)
- Nocturnes (2011)
- Future Souls (2014)

=== EPs ===
- I See Red (2007)
- Black and Blue (2011)
- EP3 (2012)

=== Singles ===
- "Not A Love Song" (2008)
- "Explode" (2008)
- "Another Case" (2011)
- "Disdain" (2012)
- "Wake To Sleep" (2012)
- "Human Nature" (2012)
- "Innocence" (2014)
