= You Suck (song) =

1994 single by the Murmurs

- Australian CD single artwork

Single by the Murmurs

from the album Murmurs
- B-side: "Mission"; "You Suck" (F*** version); "Game Player"
- Released: 1994
- Studio: Sear Sound, Looking Glass (New York City)
- Genre: Acoustic punk
- Length: 3:15
- Label: MCA
- Composer: The Murmurs
- Lyricist: Leisha Hailey
- Producers: Roger Greenawalt; Billy Basinski

The Murmurs singles chronology
"All I Need to Know" (1994)	"You Suck" (1994)	"White Rabbit" (1995)

Music video
- "You Suck" on YouTube

"You Suck" is a song by American alternative pop duo the Murmurs, released as the second single from their second studio album, Murmurs (1994). The song is about a New Yorker who ripped off band members Leisha Hailey and Heather Grody sometime during the 1990s. Composed by the Murmurs, the track is an acoustic punk song with lyrics about betrayal written by Hailey.

"You Suck" was released in 1994 via MCA Records and charted at numbers 85 and 89 on the US Cash Box Top 100 and Billboard Hot 100 charts. It also found success in Australia and Norway; in the latter country, it reached number one for a week in mid-1995. A more explicit version of the song featuring the phrase "you fuck" appears on the Australian single release. The accompanying music video was directed by David Jensen and Tim Stedman, and produced by Joseph Mustacchi.

== Background ==
According to Murmurs members Leisha Hailey and Heather Grody, the song found its inspiration some time after the duo left New York's American Academy of Dramatic Arts. The two women met a New York man who ripped them off both financially and mentally, and Hailey decided to write a song about this experience. Speaking to Billboard magazine about the track, the Murmurs clarified that the song is not a track about hating men, explaining, "It's about overcoming and making it through, getting through the roughness of a situation and going on." However, following the song's exposure from radio airplay, Hailey and Grody witnessed other women dedicating the song to their husbands or other people that had upset them. The two did not mind the song's feminist interpretation, saying that it helped bring attention to their music.

== Release and reception ==
MCA Records released "You Suck" in the United States in 1994. The song debuted and peaked at number 89 on the Billboard Hot 100 chart that December, staying at the position for two weeks. The song also peaked at number 85 on the US Cash Box Top 100 and appeared on the Billboard Modern Rock Tracks chart, reaching number 23 the same month. On January 23, 1995, "You Suck" was released in Australia. The following month, the song debuted at number 100 on the ARIA Singles Chart, peaking at number 25 in March and staying in the top 50 for 10 weeks. Listeners of Australian radio station Triple J ranked the song at 52 on the Hottest 100 of 1995 poll.

In Europe, Music & Media magazine referred to the song as a "snake in the grass" and called it "peculiar but cool" in May 1995. Later that month, on Norway's 21st chart week of 1995, "You Suck" debuted at number 19 on the country's VG-lista ranking. Two weeks later, the song entered the top 10, eventually reaching the top three on chart week 26, where it lingered for four more weeks. On chart week 31, the song rose to number one, where it stayed for that week only. It spent a total of 21 weeks in the Norwegian top 20 and was certified platinum by IFPI Norway.

== Track listings ==
- US cassette single
1. "You Suck"
2. "Mission"
- Australian CD single
1. "You Suck"
2. "You Suck" (F*** version)
3. "Mission"
- European CD single
1. "You Suck" – 3:15
2. "Mission" – 2:55
3. "Game Player" – 2:49
- The Murmurs were credited as "The Murmurs America" in Europe

== Credits and personnel ==
Credits are taken from the singles' liner notes.

Studio

- Recorded at Sear Sound and Looking Glass Studios (New York City)

Personnel

- The Murmurs – music
  - Leisha Hailey – lyrics
  - Heather Grody
- Roger Greenawalt – production, recording
- Billy Basinski – production
- Ben Wish – recording
- Arthur Spivak – management

== Charts ==
Chart (1995)	Peak position
Australia (ARIA)	25
Norway (VG-lista)	1
US Billboard Hot 100	89
US Modern Rock Tracks (Billboard)	23
US Cash Box Top 100	85

== Certifications ==
Region	Certification
Norway (IFPI Norway)	Platinum
