= The All-Girl Boys Choir =

American rock duo (2008–20??)

- Origin: Los Angeles, California, United States
- Genres: Alternative rock, Indie rock, blues rock, garage rock, outlaw country, pop rock
- Years active: 2008–20??
- Members: Alicia Warrington; Marlene "The Hammer" Hammerle

The All-Girl Boys Choir (AGBC) are an American rock duo, formed in Los Angeles, California in 2008. The group consists of Alicia Warrington (guitar, vocals, drums, bass and banjo) and Marlene "The Hammer" Hammerle (lead guitar, vocals and harmonica).

== History ==
The All-Girl Boys Choir formed in 2008 and is made up of Alicia Warrington and of Marlene Hammerle. The girls met by way of Detroit's Gore Gore Girls - Hammerle's former band on Bloodshot Records. Warrington, who works as a professional drummer in Los Angeles, California, was hired on drumming duty for the Gore Gore Girls' 2008 European tour. When the tour finished, Hammerle relocated to Los Angeles, to start working with Alicia on a new music project and The All-Girl Boys Choir was born.

In October 2009, the duo unleashed their first (self-recorded / self-released) E.P., "Walking Miracles", along with a video for their song, "Western Star". Alicia and Marlene played all of the instruments on the E.P. and struggled through broken recording equipment, a sprained wrist and laryngitis, during the recording process. While keeping their feet planted in Rock, the ladies also looked to artists like John Lee Hooker, Ike & Tina Turner and Ry Cooder for inspiration while writing "Walking Miracles".

In July 2010, they sold their belongings and purchased an RV to tour the United States. They independently booked, promoted and self-financed the "Never. Ending. Noise. Tour.", taking the AGBC's intense live show around the country for 4 months.

In 2011, Alicia and Marlene returned to their home state of Michigan to record a 7-song E.P. titled, "electric." The E.P. was recorded with engineer, Andy Van Guilder and independently released in May 2011.

== Discography ==
- Walking Miracles (2009)
- electric. (2011)

== Videos ==
- Western Star (2009)
