= Nocturno =

Nocturno may refer to:

- Nocturno (Anggun album), 1992
- Nocturno (Roy Brown album), 1991
- Nocturno (XIII. Století album), a 2010 album by XIII. Století
- Nocturno, a 2016 album by Pasquale Stafano
- Nocturno Culto (born 1972), Norwegian heavy metal musician
- Nocturno (magazine), an Italian magazine focusing on genre cinema

== See also ==
- Nocturne (disambiguation)
