= Nocturna =

Nocturna may refer to:

- Nocturna (DC Comics), a comic book supervillainess
- Nocturna (film), a 2007 animated feature
- Nocturna: Granddaughter of Dracula, a 1979 disco film
- Nocturna (band), an Italian heavy metal band
- Nocturna (album), 2022 album by Javiera Mena

== See also ==
- Nocturne (disambiguation)
