= The Murmurs =

American pop duo

- Heather Grody and Leisha Hailey, 1998

Background information
- Origin: New York City, U.S.
- Genres: Alternative pop, indie pop, folk pop
- Years active: 1991–1998
- Label: MCA
- Past members: Leisha Hailey; Heather Grody

The Murmurs were an American alternative pop music duo composed of singer-songwriters Leisha Hailey and Heather Grody.

== History ==
=== The Murmurs and Gush ===
Leisha Hailey and Heather Grody (Reid) began performing as The Murmurs in 1991 while the duo were both students of the American Academy of Dramatic Arts. They released Who Are We, produced and released by William Basinski's Arcadia Records, in 1991. The band became popular around the East Village in Manhattan. In 1994, The Murmurs signed with MCA Records. They released their self-titled major label debut album the same year. Their single "You Suck" got radio airplay and gained them national attention. While the song reached number 89 in the United States, it was a number-one hit in Norway, reaching Platinum status. The duo expanded into a four-woman group in 1997 with the addition of bassist Sheri Ozeki and drummer Sherri Solinger. They released Pristine Smut in 1997 and Blender one year later.

In 2001, Hailey and Grody reunited as a band named Gush which featured more of an indie rock sound. The band also included members Jon Skibic, Brad Caselden and Dave Doyle. They released one self-titled album that was sold exclusively at their live shows.

=== After the Murmurs ===
From 2004 to 2009, Hailey, who had previously acted on an episode of Boy Meets World in 1996 and in the 1997 movie All Over Me, starred as Alice Pieszecki, a journalist, television, and radio show host, on The L Word. Hailey has continued acting since and revived the Alice Pieszecki character on The L Word: Generation Q in 2019.

From 2007 to 2016, Hailey performed in the band Uh Huh Her with Camila Grey. The band recorded three albums and three EPs and had their music featured in the films The Kids Are All Right, Hotel for Dogs, and The Carmilla Movie.

In 2005, following the breakup of Gush, Heather Reid (formerly Grody) and Jon Skibic formed the band Redcar with Michael Sullivan and Ryan MacMillan. Their debut album was released in March 2007 and was produced by Grammy award winning producer Greg Collins (U2 and Gwen Stefani). Reid also started a record company, Phyllis Records. Reid wrote the music, book and lyrics to Dear Bernard a musical that played in Los Angeles at The Court and Zephyr theaters in 2013. The musical attracted the attention of Chrysalis Records who hired her as a songwriter for other artists. This resulted in a song she co-wrote with Hailey, "Don't Bother", being recorded by Shakira on the singer's 2005 album Oral Fixation, Vol. 2. Reid recorded a solo album, Cross Words, which was released in 2014.

In 2018, Reid was diagnosed with acute myeloid leukemia. After several months of chemotherapy, radiation, and a bone marrow transplant, Heather considered herself healed. In 2020, Reid recorded the single “Right Here Right Now”, based on her cancer diagnosis and treatment.

In 2020, Reid stated that she and Hailey "are constantly talking about a reunion for the Murmurs."

== Band members ==
- Leisha Hailey – vocals and acoustic guitar
- Heather Grody – vocals and acoustic guitar
- Sheri Ozeki – bass
- Sherri Solinger – drums

== Discography ==
=== Albums ===
- Who Are We (1991)
- The Murmurs (1994)
- Pristine Smut (1997)
- Blender (1998)

=== Singles ===
Year	Single	Peak chart positions				Certifications (sales thresholds)	Album
Year	Single	US	US Rock	AUS	NOR	Certifications (sales thresholds)	Album
1994	"All I Need to Know"	—	—	—	—		Murmurs
1994	"You Suck"	89	23	25	1	IFPI NOR: Platinum	Murmurs
1995	"White Rabbit"	—	—	—	—		Murmurs
1997	"I'm a Mess"	—	—	—	—		Pristine Smut
1998	"La Di Da"	—	—	—	—		Blender
1999	"Smash"	—	—	—	—		Blender
"—" denotes releases that did not chart
