= Dum Diane vitrea =

Medieval Latin song

"Dum Diane vitrea", also known as "Nocturne", is a Medieval Latin song known only from the Carmina Burana, a thirteenth-century collection of poems and songs. Like most of the material in the Carmina, it is an anonymous piece, though some translators have speculated that it is the work of Peter Abelard. It is the 62nd piece from the collection and is part of the grouping referred to as "Love Songs".

Besides being unsure of authorship, scholars are also divided on both the intent and length of the song. Some scholars feel that the song is purely about sleep and that the last four stanzas concerning love were a later addition and the instances of the word love in earlier stanzas are the result of transcription errors. Other scholars argue that the entire eight stanzas are the work of a single hand.

== Synopsis ==
Considered as a single work, the poem contains three parts. In the first part, including stanzas one through four, the topic is centered upon sleep and the beneficial effects of sleep upon the body. In the second part, including stanzas five and six, the focus turns to how sleep is the natural result of - and complement to - sex. The final two stanzas shift focus again, to being purely about sex.

== Analysis ==
=== Structure ===
Both the rhyme scheme and meter are irregular, though translators such as John Symonds have sometimes forced the poem into rhyming couplets. Because the poem is only known from a single source, transcription errors, partly illegible phrases, and other mistakes are difficult to identify with certainty and translators and commentators have made a number of emendations to the text. For example, the first line of the fourth stanza in the original text contains the name of Orpheus, the legendary poet and singer from Greek mythology, but many writers have emended this to Morpheus who, as god of dreams and sleeping, seems much more likely to be the name meant. Attempts to emend or otherwise "fix" the text are complicated by concerns that the eight stanzas are the result of multiple authors with differing subject matter (see below). An example of this occurs in the final line of the first stanza where the word pignora ("pledges") is used. Within the context of the "whole" version of the poem, it refers to pledges of love, but commentators who do not believe the last half of the poem is part of the original author's work have emended that word to pondera ("weights"), which is more in keeping with the subject of sleep.

Original

Dum Diane vitrea
sero lampas oritur
et a fratris rosea
luce dum succenditur,
dulcis aura zephyri
spirans omnes etheri
nubes tollit;
sic emollit
vis chordarum pectora
et immutat
cor, quod nutat
ad amoris pignora.

Free translation (by Parlett)

When Diana's crystalline
lantern rises late at night,
shimmering with undershine
from her brother's rosy light:
when the gentle Zephyr's breeze
whiffles little clouds with ease
up and away...
so then the lay
of lutenists and ligatures
lures returning
hearts from yearning
after lovers' overtures

Literal translation (by Walsh)

When the glistening torch of Diana rises late in the day and is ignited by the rosy light of her brother, the sweet breath of the West Wind with its exhalation removes all clouds from the sky. In the same way that wind by the power of his strings relieves men's breasts and transforms the heart that is wilting in the face of love's pledges

=== Background ===
There has been a great deal of debate as to the proper structure of the poem; one group of commentators feels that all eight stanzas belong together and are the work of a single author, while the other group feels that only the first four stanzas are original and the last half of the poem is an inferior addition by a later hand. A portion of this second group in fact feels that there are two later hands: one which added the fifth and sixth stanzas and another which added the seventh and eighth.

In the 1930 translation of the entire text of the Carmina Burana by Hilka, Schumann, and Bischoff, only the first four stanzas are given in the main text and the remaining four are relegated to a mere footnote for the sake of completeness. In contrast, Peter Dronke argued that all eight stanzas were the work of a single author in his 1965 book, Medieval Latin and the Rise of the European Love-Lyric, specifically citing the presence of Dum domus lapidea, an eight stanza parody of Dum Diane vitrea, later in the Carmina Burana text (CB 197). However, translators on both sides of the debate have pointed out that this merely means that the extension of the poem took place before the parody was written and doesn't definitely prove things either way. In his 1993 book, Love Lyrics from the Carmina Burana, translator P.G. Walsh stresses that examining the text itself is the only proper way to decide the debate, stating that "Stanzas 1-4 form a miniature masterpiece on the single theme of the blessings of night for the wearied lover" while the next two stanzas "[R]ead like a technical discourse on the physiological effects of lovemaking on the eyes" and the final two are merely "banal borrowings."
