= Common Reaction =

Studio album by Uh Huh Her
- Released: August 19, 2008
- Genres: Electropop, new wave
- Length: 38:37
- Label: Nettwerk Records

Uh Huh Her chronology
| I See Red (2007) | Common Reaction (2008) | Black and Blue (2011) |

Singles from Common Reaction
- 1. "Not a Love Song" Released: June 2008; 2. "Explode" Released: June 2008

Professional ratings
Review scores
| Source | Rating |
|---|---|
| !earshot | Positive |
| Blogcritics | 3/5 stars |
| Emotional Punk | 8/10 stars |
| The Gateway | Positive |
| New York Press | Positive |

Common Reaction is the debut album from Uh Huh Her, which was released on August 19, 2008, in the United States. The electropop album features Camila Grey's voice and Leisha Hailey's abilities on guitar and keyboard.

The track "Explode" was used as a soundtrack in the fifth season of the series The L Word, in the third episode "Lady of the Lake". The appearance of the song is a tribute to Leisha Hailey, who plays Alice Pieszecki in the show. The track "Dreamer" was used in the 15th episode of the eighth season of Smallville.

== Track listing ==
1. "Not a Love Song" – 3:33
2. "Explode" – 2:50
3. "Wait Another Day" – 4:01
4. "Common Reaction" – 4:01
5. "Say So" – 3:29
6. "Covered" – 3:54
7. "Everyone" – 3:37
8. "Away From Here" – 3:22
9. "So Long" – 2:42
10. "Dance With Me" – 3:02
11. "Dreamer" – 3:53

=== Bonus track ===
- "Not a Love Song" (Morgan Page Remix) – 7:13
- "Mystery Lights" – 4:15

== Music videos ==
- "Not a Love Song" (2008)
- "Explode" (2008)

== Charts ==
| Chart (2008) | Peak Position |
|---|---|
| US Top Heatseekers (Billboard) | 9 |

== Personnel ==
- Al Clay – percussion, producer, engineer, mixing, programmed percussion
- Camila Grey – synthesizer, bass, guitar, arranger, keyboards, vocals, producer, programmed percussion
- Leisha Hailey – synthesizer, vocals, bass, guitar
- Jordan Medina – drums
- Brad Ackley – guitars, bass
