= Mellowdrone =

American rock band

- Origin: Los Angeles, California, U.S.
- Genres: Lo-fi, indie rock, alternative rock, experimental
- Years active: 1999–2009, 2017–2018
- Labels: Independent, Columbia, 3E
- Members: Jonathan Bates (vocals/bass); Tony DeMatteo (guitar); Brian Borg (drums)
- Past members: Greg Griffith (bass); Cami Gutierrez (bass/keyboards); Scot Ellis (drums)
- Website: mellowdrone.com

Mellowdrone is an American rock band from Los Angeles, formed in 1999.

== Biography ==
Mellowdrone originated as Jonathan Bates' solo project, but expanded to a full band with Tony DeMatteo (guitar and keyboards), Scott Ellis (drums) and Greg Griffith (bass). Griffith and Ellis were later replaced by Camila Gutierrez and Brian Borg respectively. The band's music encompasses a range of styles from lo-fi, indie rock and experimental.

Their debut album, Box, was released in 2006 on Columbia Records. Shortly after, Gutierrez formed Uh Huh Her and left Mellowdrone. The band continued as a three-piece, with Bates taking over as bassist. Their follow-up album, Angry Bear, was released in 2009 on Coming Home Records.

Mellowdrone's music has appeared on several television shows, including Project Runway, Six Feet Under, and Cane. "C'Mon Try A Little Bit" was featured in the opening scene of Driv3r. Their song "Oh My" was featured on the FIFA 07 soundtrack and the horror movie Prom Night. "Fashionably Uninvited" was included in the soundtrack for the 2007 film The Invisible. "Orange Marmalade" was featured in the 2008 film Never Back Down and in the film Fling. "Beautiful Day" was featured on Project Gotham Racing 2.

After becoming frustrated with the logistics of a full band, Jonathan Bates began a solo project in 2010, dubbed Big Black Delta. He has also played as a touring musician for M83.

In 2017, members of The Neighbourhood who were fans of Mellowdrone contacted Jonathan and Tony for a collaboration. Both members accepted, leading to them meeting for the first time in eight years. The two were inspired to start writing songs together again, and Mellowdrone was eventually revived as a band, producing an EP in 2018.

== Discography ==
=== ...Boredom Never Sounded So Sweet ===
- EP (1999)
1. [48-17-6]
2. Ride (Finish Me Off)
3. Bitelip
4. My First Love Song
5. Monsters
6. Justine
7. Spoiled Boy
8. Happy Together

=== Glassblower ===
- EP (2001)
1. Fall On Your Knees
2. You And I
3. Glassblower
4. It All Makes Sense Now
5. #3

=== A Demonstration of Intellectual Property ===
- EP (2003)
1. Tinylittle
2. Fashionably Uninvited
3. And Repeat
4. No More Options
5. Ridealong
6. Beautiful Day
7. Bitelip

=== Go Get 'Em Tiger ===
- EP (2004)
1. Bonemarrow
2. Worst Song Ever
3. Motivation
4. I'm Too Young
5. Pretty Boy
6. Anglophile

=== Box ===
- (2006)
1. C'Mon Try A Little Bit
2. Oh My
3. Four Leaf Clover
4. Fashionably Uninvited
5. Beautiful Day
6. Fuck It Man
7. Whatever The Deal
8. Madison
9. And Repeat
10. Orange Marmalade
11. Amazing
12. Bone Marrow
13. Limb To Limb

=== Maquina 7" ===
- (2008)
1. Maquina
2. Machine (En Espanol)
3. Settle the Hum (B-Side)
4. Wouldn't Mind (B-Side)

=== Angry Bear ===
- (2009)
1. Wherever You May Go
2. Elephant
3. Alone=In Your Face
4. Esmeralda
5. Big Winner
6. Sugar
7. Drinking Song
8. Lady in Her Underwear
9. Logged Hours
10. Button
11. Jumping Off the Pier
12. DMT

=== 2018 ===
- EP (2018)
1. I Don't Believe It
2. Way Out

=== 3 ===
- EP (2018)
1. Let It Out
2. Pascal's Wager
3. I Forgive You
