= Character piece =

Musical composition expressive of a mood or idea

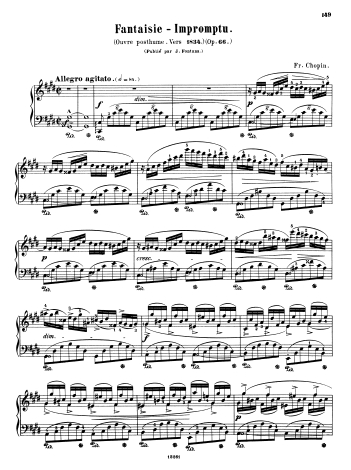
The first page of Frédéric Chopin's "Fantaisie-Impromptu," one of the best known character pieces

A character (or "characteristic") piece is a musical composition which is expressive of a specific mood or non-musical idea.

== History ==
The first appearance of the term "character piece" is in the avertissement (preface) to Marin Marais's fifth book of viola da gamba music published in 1725. He writes that pièces de caractère are now received favorably by the public, so he has decided to insert many of them. Marais's pieces such as "La Petite Badinage" and "Dialogue" have descriptive, literary titles, as opposed to the ordinary titles of stylized dances such as the allemande and courante.

In German, the term Charakterstück was originally used to denote a broad range of 19th-century piano music based on a single idea or program, although attempts to use musical effects to describe nonmusical subjects are “probably as old as music itself.”

Character pieces are a staple of Romantic music, and are essential to that movement's interest in the evocation of particular moods or moments. What distinguishes character pieces is the specificity of the idea they invoke. Along with invoking these ideas, composers such as Robert Schumann use romantic irony to enhance the depth of their works, creating powerful illusions, “[Music] is an evidently art which lifts mankind above life”. Some of these illusions through romantic irony are broken, “this technique exposes an illusion the view that the composition in question came into existence purely spontaneously”, adding color and individuality into the classical mainstream. Many character pieces are composed in ternary form, but that form is not universal in the genre. A common feature is a title expressive of the character intended, such as Stephen Heller's Voyage autour de ma chambre ("Voyage around my room"), an early example of the genre, or Bruckner's Abendklänge ("Evening harmonies"). Many character pieces have titles based on literature (Schumann's Kreisleriana, 1838) or personal experiences (Schumann's Kinderszenen, 1838). Other character pieces have titles suggesting brevity and singularity of concept, such as Beethoven's Bagatelles, or Debussy's Préludes, or casual construction: the title Impromptu is common. Many 19th-century nocturnes and intermezzi are character pieces as well, including those of Chopin and Brahms, respectively.

Large sets of many individual character pieces, intended to be played as a single piece of music, were not uncommon; Schumann's many works of this form (including Kreisleriana and Carnaval) are the best known examples. In the late 19th and twentieth centuries, as piano music became ambitious and larger in scale, the scope of what a character piece could reference grew as well. The New Grove cites Smetana's "Festival of the Gypsy Peasants" and Sibelius's "The Oarsman" as examples of this later trend.

== Sources ==
- Brown, Maurice J.E. "Character piece." Grove Music Online, http://www.grovemusic.com.
- Randel, Don Michael. Harvard Concise Dictionary of Music. Harvard UP, 1978.
