= Piano Concerto No. 2 (Field) =

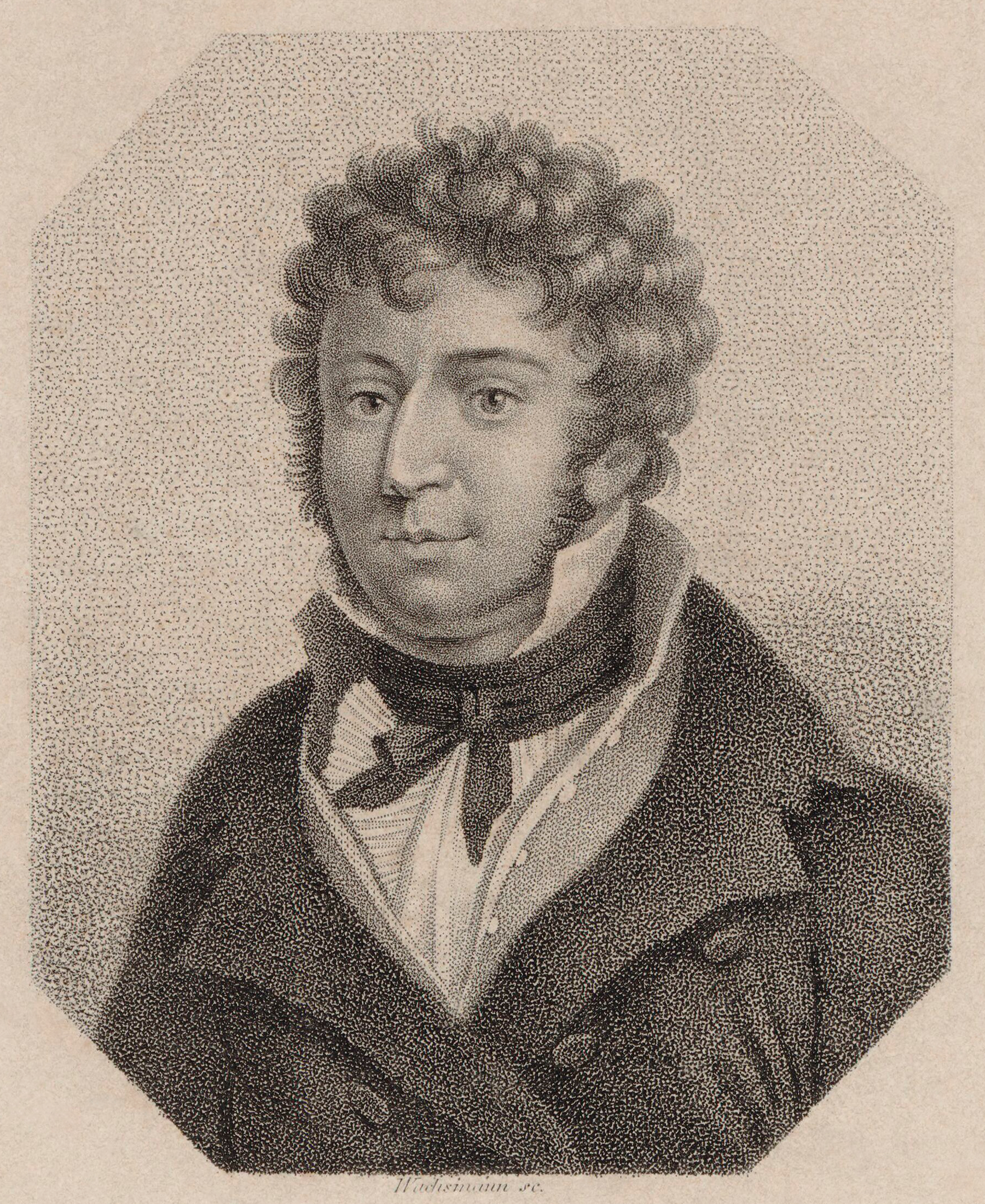
Engraving of John Field by Anton Wachsmann, c. 1820

John Field's Piano Concerto No. 2 in A♭ major (H. 31) was composed by 1811 and published in full first in Leipzig in 1816. It consists of the usual three movements, in a fast–slow–fast form:

1. Allegro moderato
2. Poco adagio
3. Rondo: Moderato innocente

Field wrote the piece in classical sonata form; however, he didn't include a cadenza at the end of the first movement due to its relative length, and made the second movement quite short. Field wrote the composition using the more lyric, subdued, slightly melancholy style typical of late Mozart, rather than the joyous "happy-go-lucky mood" of Haydn or the bombastic display of Beethoven. In particular, it appears to have some influence from Mozart's famous Clarinet Concerto. In addition, it is imbued with lyric themes and even instrumental embellishments which are reminiscent of those from the composer's native Ireland. In three different sections of the first movement (first in E♭, then F minor, and lastly A♭), a lyric section with harp-like movements in the left hand is followed by a driving, audibly Irish-style reel which brings the section to a close with a Mozart-style cadential trill. The influence of his mentor Muzio Clementi (who was apparently an admirer of Mozart) was also important especially in the more Romantic features of the work.

It has consistently been the most popular of Field's seven concertos. Composer and critic Robert Schumann rated it highly, and it was the only one never to go out of print at any time. Field's compositions were very popular in the 19th century, but he became relatively unknown during the 20th as musical fashions changed. Due to this, Field is not nearly as well known as contemporaries such as Felix Mendelssohn or Franz Schubert.
