= Nocturnes (Field) =

List of nocturnes by John Field

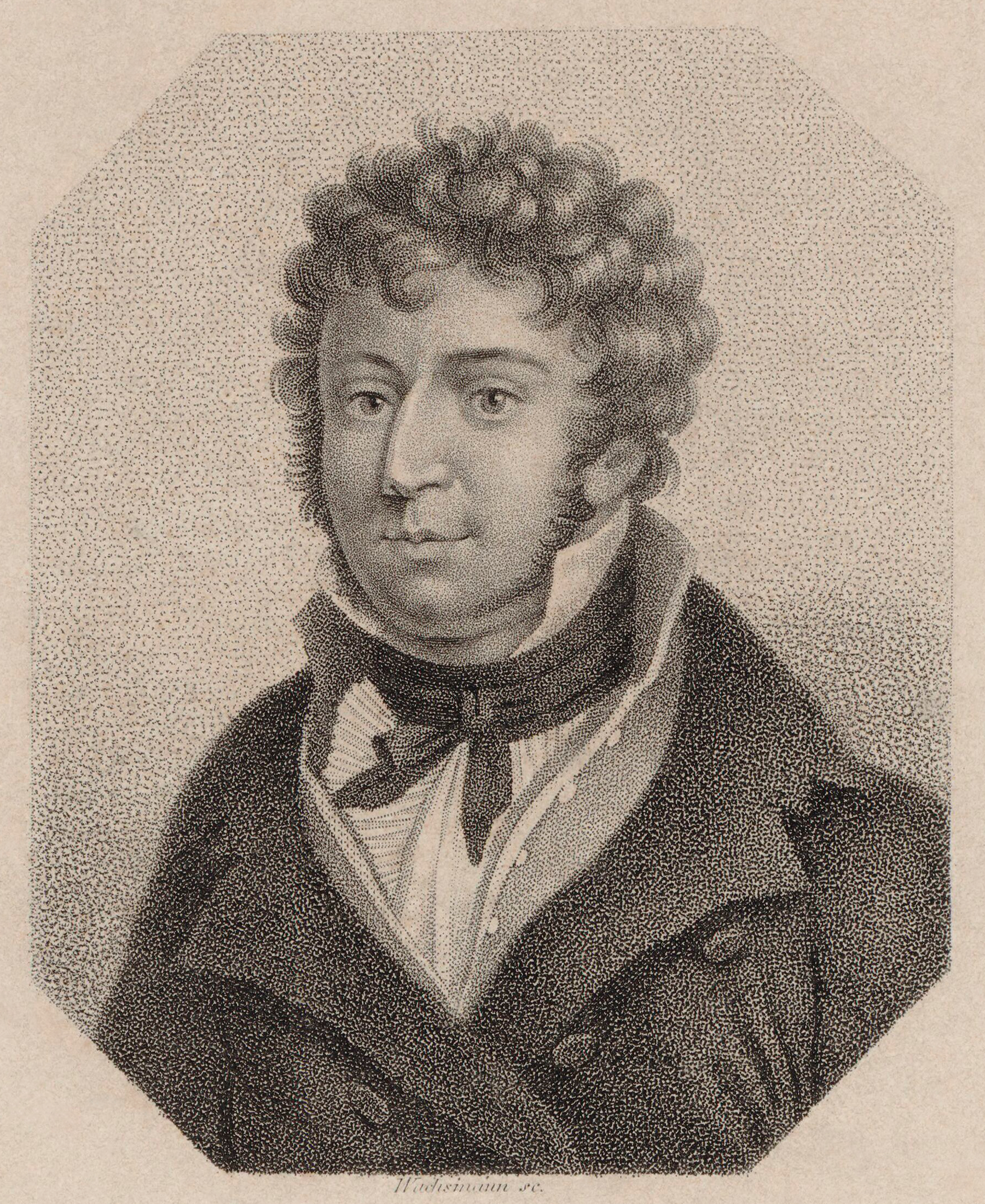
Engraving of John Field by Anton Wachsmann, c. 1820

Irish composer John Field was the first composer to use the term 'Nocturne' in the Romantic sense, to apply to a character piece featuring a cantabile melody over an arpeggiated accompaniment. He has been widely credited as the inventor of the genre.

== List of works ==
There is no congruent historic numbering for the nocturnes. This list is arranged according to Hopkinson numbers, introduced in the 1961 catalogue by Cecil Hopkinson.

- H 24 – Nocturne for piano No. 1 in E♭ major – 1812
- H 25 – Nocturne for piano No. 2 in C minor – 1812
- H 26 – Nocturne for piano No. 3 in A♭ major – 1812
- H 36 – Nocturne for piano No. 4 in A major – 1817
- H 37 – Nocturne for piano No. 5 in B♭ major – 1817
- H 40 – Nocturne for piano No. 6 "Cradle Song" in F major – 1817
- H 45 – Nocturne for piano No. 7 "Reverie" in C major – 1821
- H 46 – Nocturne for piano No. 8 in E minor – 1821
- H 14E – Nocturne for piano No. 9 "Pastorale" in A major
- H 30A – Nocturne for piano No. 10 "Romance" in E♭ major – 1816
- H 56 – Nocturne for piano No. 11 in E♭ major – 1832
- H 58D – Nocturne for piano No. 12 in G major – 1822
- H 59 – Nocturne for piano No. 13 "Song without Words" in D minor – 1834
- H 60 – Nocturne for piano No. 14 in C major – 1835
- H 61 – Nocturne for piano No. 15 in C major – 1836
- H 62 – Nocturne for piano No. 16 in F major – 1836
- H 54 – Nocturne for piano [No. 17] "Grande Pastorale" in E major – (two different versions)
- H 13K – Nocturne for piano [No. 18] "Noontide" in E major

Additional nocturnes:

- H 55 – Nocturne for piano "The Troubadour" in C major
- H 63 – Nocturne for piano in B♭ major – op. posth.
- H 66 – Nocturne "Dernière pensèe"

== Sources ==
- Cecil Hopkinson, 'A Bibliographical Thematic Catalogue of the Works of John Field, 1782–1837' (London, 1961)
