= Camila Grey =

American musician (born 1985)

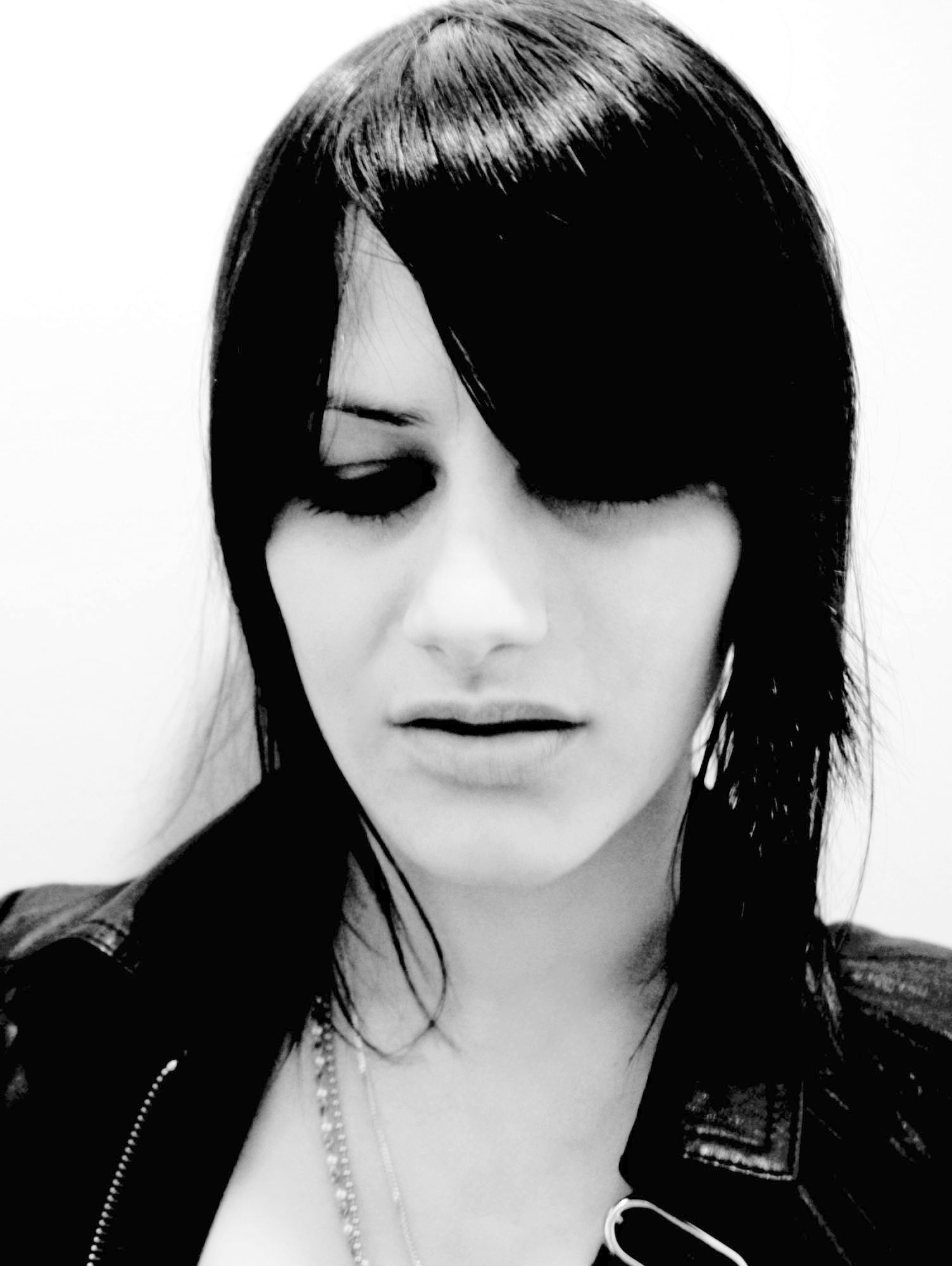
- Grey in 2007

Background information
- Occupations: Singer, musician, songwriter, producer
- Instruments: Vocals, keyboards, bass, guitar
- Partner: Clea Duvall (2005-2010) Leisha Hailey (2011–2016) Olivia Lund (2022-2026)
- Website: uhhuhher.com

Camila Grey is an American musician. As of 2023, she is currently playing keyboards for Morrissey and is also part of the duo Rogues with actor Luke Brandon Field. She has played keyboards for pop vocalist Adam Lambert. She is also part of the supergroup Summer Moon composed of Nikolai Fraiture (The Strokes), Stephen Perkins (Jane's Addiction), and Noah Harmon (Airborne Toxic Event), and plays keyboards for Minke. Grey was formerly the bassist and keyboardist for the band Mellowdrone as well as the half of the duo Uh Huh Her with Leisha Hailey. She has also worked with Dr. Dre, Busta Rhymes, Big Black Delta, Tricky, Linda Perry, Kanye West, Melissa Auf der Maur, Hans Zimmer and Kelly Osbourne.

On May 6, 2023, it was announced on Morrissey's website that Grey would join his band for tours of Israel, Ireland, and England.

== Early life ==
Camila Grey was born Camila Cristinna Gutierrez in Dallas, Texas, but grew up in Austin.

Grey began playing piano as a child and attended the Suzuki music school. She later attended Berklee College of Music where she met Mellowdrone bandmate Jonathan Bates, who was also enrolled. After graduating, Grey moved to L.A. and began working as a session singer vocalist. Her work includes the soundtracks to Something's Gotta Give, Dirty Dancing: Havana Nights, Catwoman, and the television show Nip/Tuck.

== 2007–2015, Uh Huh Her ==
Grey is a native of Austin, Texas. After meeting at a party, Grey began working with Leisha Hailey (actress on The L Word and former member of 1990s group The Murmurs) on songs which would be released in 2007 on the EP I See Red. The album was recorded at Grey's L.A. home, and the vocals were reportedly recorded inside of Grey's bathroom. As Uh Huh Her, Grey and Hailey released an album in 2008, titled Common Reaction. Shortly after Common Reaction's release, Uh Huh Her was dropped from Nettwerk, prompting Grey and Hailey to start releasing music independently on their own label Plaid, even stating that they still owed Nettwerk money.

From 2009 to 2023, Grey played keyboards for Adam Lambert's live band. Consequently, she was also on Glam Nation Live, released in early 2011, and Acoustic Live!, released in late 2010.

In the spring of 2011, Uh Huh Her released a second EP titled Black and Blue and finished a tour promoting it in May 2011. They released their sophomore record titled Nocturnes in late summer/early fall of 2011, co-produced by Wendy Melvoin and mixed by Tchad Blake. They then released EP3, a collection of their old songs re-imagined acoustically. They released their third studio album titled Future Souls on March 25, 2014, via their imprint Plaid Records. On December 15, 2016, Uh Huh Her announced on their official Facebook page that they were taking a hiatus, with Grey joining another indie band called Summer Moon.

== Personal life ==
In 2011, Grey was in a relationship with her Uh Huh Her bandmate Leisha Hailey. That same year, the couple was removed from a Southwest Airlines flight after they shared a kiss. A flight attendant approached the couple, after receiving a passenger complaint about them kissing, and stated it was a "family airline", and asked them to stop. When an argument ensued between them and the flight attendant, they were removed from the plane. When Hailey highlighted the incident on social media, Southwest said the couple's removal was because of "several passengers complaints". The airline later offered them a refund for the flight.
