= Car Thing =

Music streaming device

- Developer: Spotify
- Type: Music streaming device
- Released: 13 April 2021; 5 years ago
- Discontinued: 2022 (production); 24 December 2024; 22 months ago (functionality)
- Operating system: Android and iOS
- Display: 800×480 resolution
- Dimensions: 2.5 in (6.4 cm) H; 4.6 in (12 cm) W; 0.7 in (1.8 cm) D
- Weight: 3.4 oz (96 g)
- Website: carthing.spotify.com (archived)

The Car Thing is a discontinued music streaming device developed by Spotify and produced from 2021 to 2022. The Car Thing was designed to be used in vehicles to stream music from Spotify's platform with its touchscreen and voice controls. It made an initial limited launch in April 2021 and was launched to the public in February 2022. In July 2022, Spotify ended production for the device, citing low consumer interest and supply chain issues. In May 2024, Spotify announced that support for the Car Thing would end in December of that year, rendering the device inoperable after that point. The Car Thing was generally a critical and commercial failure, losing Spotify $31.4 million.

== Description ==
The Car Thing weighs 3.4 ounces and measures 4.6 in (12 cm) wide, 2.5 in (6.4 cm) tall, and 0.7 in (1.8 cm) thick. Its touchscreen is 4 inches (10 centimetres) wide and has an 800x480 resolution. A rubber knob used to navigate menus is located to the right of the touchscreen. The Car Thing has five buttons on its upper edge for settings and presets and a USB-C port. It was shipped with multiple attachments in order to affix the device to a vehicle's dashboard, CD player, or air conditioning vents. It uses an Amlogic processor, and has 4GB of storage from an eMMC and 512MB of RAM.

The device utilizes Spotify's "Hey Spotify" voice commands. In order to stream music, the Car Thing must be connected to a smartphone as well as to a vehicle via USB cable, aux cable, or Bluetooth. A Spotify Premium subscription is also required. It functions with both Android and iOS.

== History ==
=== Development and release ===
Spotify first announced the Car Thing in May 2019, its first piece of hardware, intending for it to collect data on the habits of its users. It was originally designed to be a voice-controlled prototype with a limited release; Spotify would later reiterate that its main focus would remain music streaming, not hardware. In January 2021, an FCC filing made by Spotify revealed a new prototype of the Car Thing, demonstrating a device much larger than the original and with a touchscreen added.

Spotify announced the product's limited commercial launch on 13 April 2021; as part of the release, Spotify Premium subscribers selected from a waitlist received the device for shipping cost. The company described the purpose of the Car Thing as enhancing the music streaming experience of motorists in vehicles lacking CarPlay and Android Auto. The Car Thing's release was expanded on 14 October, being made available to Premium members on the waitlist at a price of $79.99. On 22 February, its price was raised to $89.99, and it became available to all Premium members.

=== Discontinuation ===
On 27 July 2022, just fifteen months after the Car Thing's initial limited launch and five months after its public launch, Spotify announced that they would end production of the Car Thing and lowered its price to $49.99. Spotify cited supply chain issues and lack of consumer interest as reasons as to why they would cease production, a move that led to a $31.4 million loss for the company. Only a couple weeks later, on 20 August, the price was again lowered to $30.

On 23 May 2024, Spotify announced its decision to end support for the Car Thing by the end of the year, informing users that their devices would no longer be functional after 9 December. This led to the filing of a class action lawsuit within the same week, with the plaintiffs accusing Spotify of "prematurely render[ing] the Car Thing obsolete." Following the lawsuit, Spotify began to offer refunds to customers who purchased the Car Thing directly from Spotify's website. The Car Thing officially ceased functionality on 9 December 2024, as was previously announced. Since then, some owners have modified their Car Things to run alternate operating systems, thus maintaining their functionality.

== Reception ==
The Car Thing was a commercial failure and was generally poorly received by critics. Will Greenwald of PCMag criticized the device's "awkward interface" and its lack of navigation features. Following its discontinuation, Brady Snyder of Android Police called the device "misguided" and "doomed from the start" due to its weak components, and lamented the e-waste that would result after it ceased to function. Alex Lauer of Inside Hook praised its design; however, he found Spotify's claim that the Car Thing could function with any car misleading. Alexander Stoklosa of Motor Trend described the Car Thing as overly complicated and expensive when compared to other simpler options. Conversely, Zach Gale, also of Motor Trend, considered the Car Thing a feasible option for certain users.
