= Nocturne =

Musical composition inspired by the night

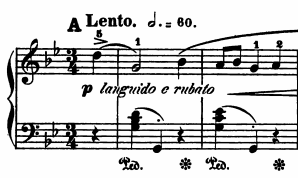
Frédéric Chopin's Nocturne in F## Minor, Op. 15, No. 3. The marking "languido e rubato", slow tempo, and subdued dynamics creates an evocative mood characteristic of nocturnes.

A nocturne is a musical composition that is inspired by, or evocative of, the night.

== History ==
The term nocturne (from French nocturne "of the night") was first applied to musical pieces in the 18th century, when it indicated an ensemble piece in several movements, normally played for an evening party and then laid aside. Sometimes it carried the Italian equivalent, notturno, such as Wolfgang Amadeus Mozart's Notturno in D, K.286, written for four lightly echoing separated ensembles of paired horns with strings, and his Serenata Notturna, K. 239. At this time, the piece was not necessarily evocative of the night, but might merely be intended for performance at night, much like a serenade. The chief difference between the serenade and the notturno was the time of the evening at which they would typically be performed: the former around 9:00 pm, the latter closer to 11:00 pm.

In its form as a single-movement character piece usually written for solo piano, the nocturne was cultivated primarily in the 19th century. The first nocturnes to be written under the specific title of "nocturne" were by the Irish composer John Field, generally viewed as the father of the Romantic nocturne that characteristically features a cantabile melody over an arpeggiated, even guitar-like accompaniment. However, the most famous exponent of the form was Frédéric Chopin, who wrote 21 of them. Later composers to write nocturnes for the piano include Gabriel Fauré, Alexander Scriabin, Erik Satie (1919), Francis Poulenc (1929), as well as Peter Sculthorpe. In the movement entitled 'The Night's Music' ('Musiques nocturnes' in French) of Out of Doors for solo piano (1926), Béla Bartók imitated the sounds of nature. It contains quiet, eerie, blurred cluster-chords and imitations of the twittering of birds and croaking of nocturnal creatures, with lonely melodies in contrasting sections. American composer Lowell Liebermann has written eleven Nocturnes for piano, of which No.6 was arranged by the composer as Nocturne for Orchestra. Other notable nocturnes from the 20th century include those from Michael Glenn Williams, Samuel Barber and Robert Helps.

Other examples of nocturnes include the one for orchestra from Felix Mendelssohn's incidental music for A Midsummer Night's Dream (1848), the set of three for orchestra and female choir by Claude Debussy (who also wrote one for solo piano) and the first movement of the Violin Concerto No. 1 (1948) by Dmitri Shostakovich. French composer Erik Satie composed a series of five small nocturnes. These were, however, far different from those of Field and Chopin. In 1958, Benjamin Britten wrote a Nocturne for tenor, seven obbligato instruments and strings, and the third movement of his Serenade for Tenor, Horn and Strings (1943) is also titled "Nocturne".

Nocturnes are generally thought of as being tranquil, often expressive and lyrical, and sometimes rather gloomy, but in practice pieces with the name nocturne have conveyed a variety of moods: the second of Debussy's orchestral Nocturnes, "Fêtes", for example, is very lively, as are parts of Karol Szymanowski's Nocturne and Tarantella (1915) and Kaikhosru Shapurji Sorabji's Symphonic Nocturne for Piano Alone (1977–78).

== Principal composers of nocturnes ==
- Charles-Valentin Alkan: five for solo piano
- Anton Stepanovich Arensky: two nocturnes for piano, each part of a set: No. 1 from Six Pieces, Op. 5 (1884); No. 3 from Twenty-four Characteristic Pieces, Op. 36 (1894); a nocturne for two pianos, no. 8 from Variations (Suite No. 3), Op. 33
- Arno Babajanyan: his nocturne, a lyrical piece in easy listening genre and a song performed by Muslim Magomayev, is one of his most popular works
- Mily Balakirev: 3 for solo piano
- Samuel Barber: the last of Four Songs, for voice and piano, Op. 13 (1938–40) is titled "Nocturne" (to a text by Frederic Prokosch), and this song also exists in a version with orchestra; Nocturne (Homage to John Field), for piano, Op. 33 (1959)
- William Basinski: Nocturnes
- Arnold Bax: Nocturnes, for soprano and orchestra (1911)
- Jackson Berkey: 24 Nocturnes for solo piano and Four Nocturnes for Orchestra
- Georges Bizet: Premier nocturne en fa majeur Op. 2 and Nocturne in D major.
- Alexander Borodin: his String Quartet No. 2 third movement Notturno contains one of his most popular melodies (1881)
- Lili Boulanger: Nocturne pour violon et piano (1911)
- Benjamin Britten: Nocturne, from On This Island, Op. 11
- Frédéric Chopin: 21 for solo piano, 1 spurious
- Carl Czerny: 17 for solo piano
- Claude Debussy: 3 for orchestra and choir, one for solo piano
- Norman Dello Joio: Two Nocturnes, for piano (E major, F♯ major, 1946)
- Antonin Dvořák: Nocturne in B for string orchestra (1883)
- Roger Evernden: 10 Nocturnes for solo piano (2019)
- Gabriel Fauré: 13 for solo piano
- John Field: originator of the piano nocturne, wrote 18 of them
- Irving Fine: Notturno, for strings and harp (1950–51)
- Mikhail Glinka: three nocturnes: E♭ major, "La Separation" in F minor, "Le Regret" (lost)
- Louis Moreau Gottschalk: four for piano solo, "Pensée poétique" (1852–53), "Solitude" (1856), "Murmures Eoliens" (1860), "La chute des feuilles" (1860)
- Edvard Grieg: the fourth piece of his Lyric Pieces, Op 54 is a nocturne
- Arthur Honegger: Nocturne for orchestra (1936, partly based on music from ballet Sémiramis)
- Vasily Kalinnikov: Nocturne in F♯ minor, for piano (1894)
- Jan Kalivoda: Six Nocturnes for Viola and Piano, op. 186
- Friedrich Kalkbrenner: 4 nocturnes for solo piano
- Kevin Keller: 10 nocturnes for piano and treatments
- Ignace Leybach: now known only for his Fifth Nocturne
- Lowell Liebermann: 11 for solo piano and Nocturne for Orchestra
- Malcolm Lipkin: Eight Nocturnes for solo piano (1987-2006)
- Franz Liszt: one for solo piano entitled En rêve ('In a dream' or 'While dreaming'), another for solo piano entitled Pensées ('Thoughts'), plus his collection of three Liebesträume (Love Dreams), a series of three Notturnos, of which no.3 is the most famous, Les cloches de Genève: Nocturne (The Bells of Geneva: Nocturne) in B major
- Sergei Lyapunov: Nocturne, for solo piano, in D♭ major, op. 8
- Donald Martino: Notturno, for six instrumentalists (1973, winner of the 1974 Pulitzer Prize for Music)
- Felix Mendelssohn Bartholdy: wrote the incidental music, for William Shakespeare's play, A Midsummer Night's Dream
- Johann Kaspar Mertz: 3 Nocturnes for Guitar, opus 4.
- Ernest John Moeran: Nocturne, for baritone, chorus, and orchestra (1934, text by Robert Nichols)
- Andrzej Panufnik: Nocturne for orchestra (1947, rev. 1955)
- Francis Poulenc: eight for solo piano (1929)
- Almeida Prado: 14 nocturnes for solo piano (1985-1991)
- Sergei Rachmaninoff: three for solo piano (1887–1888) and one Op. 10 No. 1 from Morceaux de Salon (1894)
- Ottorino Respighi: one piano nocturne as part of his Six Piano Pieces R.44 (1904)
- Erik Satie: five for solo piano (1919)
- Maria Schneider: Nocturne, on her album Allégresse (2000)
- Clara Schumann (Clara Josephine Wieck): Nocturne in F major Op.6 No.2 from Soirées Musicales (1819–1896)
- Robert Schumann: four Nachtstücke
- Alexander Scriabin: four nocturnes, including one written for the left hand only (opus 9, 1894)
- Kaikhosru Shapurji Sorabji: over 30 for solo piano
- Franz Strauss: Nocturno, Op. 7 for horn (1864)
- Maria Agata Szymanowska: Nocturne in B♭ and Nocturne Le Murmure
- Alexandre Tansman: Four Nocturnes, for piano (1952)
- Pyotr Ilyich Tchaikovsky: Nocturne (No. 4 of Six Pieces, Op. 19) (1873), and Tchaikovsky's arrangement for cello with small orchestra for Anatoly Brandukov, from a transcription for Wilhelm Fitzenhagen (1888)
- Sigismond Thalberg: 7 nocturnes for piano (Opp. 16, 21, 28, 51 and 1 without op. number)
- Edgard Varèse: Nocturnal, for soprano, bass, chorus, and small orchestra (text from Anaïs Nin: The House of Incest, 1961), and Nocturnal II (Nuit), for soprano, flute, oboe, clarinet, 1 or 2 trumpets, 2 trombones, percussion, and double bass (text from Anaïs Nin: The House of Incest, 1961–65)
- Ralph Vaughan Williams: Three Nocturnes, for baritone, semi-chorus, and orchestra (text by Walt Whitman, 1908); "nocturne", the first of Three Poems by Walt Whitman (1925)
- Heitor Villa-Lobos: Nocturne for solo piano, from Hommage à Chopin (1947)

== Popular music ==
- Kate Bush: One on her 2005 album Aerial, Side Sky of Honey
- Jay Chou: One on his 2005 album November's Chopin
- Maxence Cyrin: ten on his 2014 album Nocturnes (Solo Piano)
- Eden: One on his debut EP End Credits
- Daniel Liam Glyn: Electronic / Ambient concept album Nocturnes (2020)
- Earle Hagen (and Dick Rogers): Harlem Nocturne (1939)
- Robyn Hitchcock: "Nocturne (Prelude)" and "Nocturne (Demise)" on his album I Often Dream of Trains (1984)
- Joe Jackson: One on his 1987 album Will Power, four on his 1994 album Night Music
- Billy Joel: One on his 1971 album Cold Spring Harbor
- Keeno: Drum & Bass interpolation "Nocturne" (2013), used as title track for Forza Horizon 2
- Laufey: "Nocturne (Interlude)" on her album Bewitched (2023)
- Rush: One on their 2002 album Vapor Trails
- Tesseract: One on their 2013 album Altered State
- Vangelis: Nocturne: The Piano Album (2019)
- Wild Nothing: Nocturne (2012)
- Warren Zevon: One on his 1987 album Sentimental Hygiene
- Bonobo: Noctuary

== See also ==
- Aubade, "a song or instrumental composition concerning, accompanying, or evoking daybreak"
- Night music, nocturnal music of Hungarian composer Béla Bartók
- Nocturne, a 1961 jazz album by Oliver Nelson
- Nocturne, a 1983 live album by Siouxsie and the Banshees
- Nocturne: Blue and Gold – Old Battersea Bridge by Whistler (painted c. 1872–75)
