= Leisha Hailey =

American musician and actress

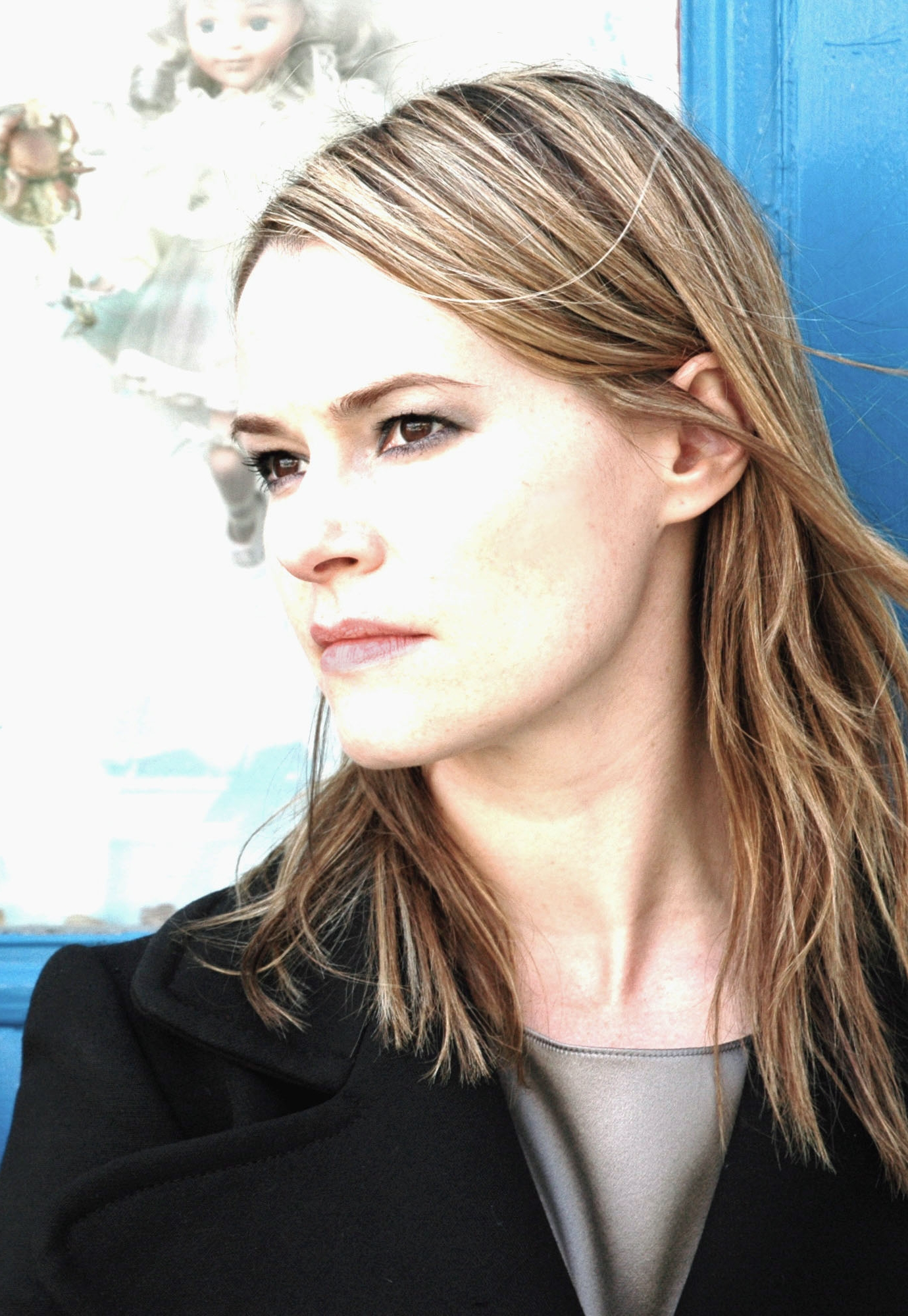
- Hailey circa 2007
- Born: 1971 or 1972 (age 54–55); Okinawa, Okinawa Islands, USCAR (present-day Japan)
- Occupations: Actress, musician
- Years active: 1991–present
- Partners: Kim Dickens (1991–1996; 2017–present); k.d. lang (1996–2001); Camila Grey (2011–2016)

Leisha Hailey (born 1971 or 1972) is an American actress and musician known for playing Alice Pieszecki in the Showtime Networks series The L Word and The L Word: Generation Q. Hailey first came to the public's attention as a musician in the pop duo the Murmurs and has continued her music career as part of the band Uh Huh Her. Currently, Hailey hosts podcast PANTS with fellow L Word star and close friend, Kate Moennig.

== Early life ==
Born in Okinawa, USCAR (now Japan) to American parents, Hailey grew up in Bellevue, Nebraska.

At 17, she came out as lesbian before moving to New York City to attend the American Academy of Dramatic Arts.

== Career ==
=== Music ===
With her Academy classmate Heather Grody, she formed the pop duo The Murmurs in 1991. In the 1990s, they released several albums and performed with Lilith Fair. In 2001, Hailey and Grody changed their name to Gush. The group disbanded when Hailey was cast in The L Word. In 2005, Hailey founded Marfa Records.

In July 2007, Uh Huh Her, an electropop duo consisting of Hailey and Camila Grey, released an EP entitled I See Red; over a year later they released their first album Common Reaction.

Hailey also co-wrote the Shakira hit song "Don't Bother" for her 2005 hit album Oral Fixation Vol. 2.

Hailey performing at Shepherd's Bush Empire in London, April 2012

=== Acting ===
Hailey's television debut was in 1996 when she played a struggling musician on an episode of Boy Meets World. Her first major film role was in the 1997 movie All Over Me.

From 2004 to 2009, she starred as Alice Pieszecki, a journalist, television, and radio show host, on The L Word. At the beginning of the series, Hailey's character identified as bisexual. By the end of the series, specifically in season 5, her character dated mostly women. In 2007, Hailey was voted #1 in the AfterEllen Hot 100 list compiled by AfterEllen.com.

In September 2008, Showtime announced Hailey would star in The Farm, a "pilot presentation spinoff" of The L Word, to be written and produced by Ilene Chaiken, creator and executive producer of The L Word. It was announced in April 2009 that the show would not be picked up by Showtime.

Hailey's award-winning indie film La Cucina premiered on Showtime in December 2009, where she plays a straight pregnant newlywed.

Hailey has appeared in several Yoplait yogurt commercials as well as a BMW commercial. In April 2008, Hailey was named spokesperson for Olivia Cruises, a travel company which sells cruises and resort vacations marketed towards lesbian customers.

In 2011, she starred in the psychological thriller Fertile Ground. In 2015, Hailey appeared in an episode of long-running The CW show Supernatural as Amelia Novak, the estranged wife of Jimmy Novak (human vessel of the angel Castiel).

In May 2026, she is set to star as Joyce Price, the mother of Chloe Price, in the television adaptation of Life Is Strange.

=== Writing ===
In 2025, Hailey co-authored a memoir, So Gay for You: Friendship, Found Family, and the Show That Started It All, with her L Word co-star Kate Moennig. Charlie Covell will adapt this book into a TV series at Amazon MGM Studios.

== Personal life ==
Hailey dated actress Kim Dickens from the age of 19 for ‘five nurturing and expansive years,’ up to 1996. Hailey dated k.d. lang for nearly five years until breaking up in 2001. She also had a relationship with Nina Garduno from 2004 to 2010. From 2011 to 2016, she dated her bandmate Camila Grey. In 2011, the couple were involved in a dispute with Southwest Airlines, after being ejected from a flight for arguing with a flight attendant who asked them to stop kissing. Hailey and Kim Dickens are currently in a relationship.

== Filmography ==
Film
Year	Film	Role	Notes
1997	All Over Me	Lucy	
1998	Some Girl	The Murmurs	
1999	Sleeping Beauties	Sno Blo Band	
2002	The Snowflake Crusade	Marigold	
2007	La Cucina	Shelly	
2009	Make Up	Shelley Cabot	
2010	Fertile Ground	Emily Weaver	
2016	Love Is All You Need?	Coach Jenkins	
2016	Quarries	Madison	
2017	Dead Ant	Stevie	
Television
Year	Title	Role	Notes
1996	Boy Meets World	Corinna	1 episode
1997	Ellen	Woman in gay bar	1 episode
2004–2009	The L Word	Alice Pieszecki	70 episodes
2006	CSI: Crime Scene Investigation	Allison Bradford	1 episode
2006	Grey's Anatomy	Claire Solomon	1 episode
2007–2011	American Dad!	Lily (Voice)	4 episodes
2009	Maneater	Harriet	1 episode
2010	Drop Dead Diva	Hope Prentiss	1 episode
2010	CSI: Crime Scene Investigation	Dana Carlston	1 episode
2012	The New Normal	Victoria	1 episode
2014	Constantine	Lanni's wife	1 episode
2015	Supernatural	Amelia Novak	1 episode
2015	Chasing Life	Juliet	1 episode
2016	Bosch	Maureen "Mo" O'Grady	7 episodes
2016	Code Black	Natalie	1 episode
2017	Silicon Valley	Liz Tinsdale	2 episodes
2017	Strangers	Kim	1 episode
2019–2023	The L Word: Generation Q	Alice Pieszecki	28 episodes
TBA	Life Is Strange	Joyce Price	Main cast

== Bibliography ==
- So Gay for You: Friendship, Found Family, and the Show That Started It All (2025) by Kate Moennig and Leisha Hailey, St. Martin's Press, ISBN 978-1250361363
