= O-Zone Inc =

O-Zone, Inc.
- Trade name: O-Zone
- Native name: O-Zone Productions (former)
- Formerly: O-Zone Productions
- Company type: Private
- Industry: Media Production
- Founded: 1986
- Founder: Gary S. Rosenthal
- Headquarters: Washington, D.C., United States
- Area served: United States
- Key people: Gary S. Rosenthal (Founder)
- Products: Marketing media, Educational media, Entertainment media
- Services: Production, Distribution, Consultation, Training

O-Zone, Inc. is a production company focused on the creation and distribution of marketing, educational, and entertainment media.

== History ==
O-Zone, Inc. was founded by Gary S. Rosenthal in 1986 as O-Zone Productions, with the goal of education through communication. Gary stated “I really find a lot of joy in taking a complicated concept and making it understandable to any audience. Being at the right place at the right time O-Zone had a lot of commercial success as an early developer of content for HBO and MTV Networks, including, MTV, VH1, and Nickelodeon. In 1992, O-Zone Productions moved from New York City to Washington, D.C., and changed focus from broadcast television to develop other long form marketing and educational media. In 1998 O-Zone, Inc. was created to handle the diversification of media channel offerings. These have included educational programs for the National Institute of Mental Health (NIMH), the National Institutes of Health (NIH). It has produced, consulted and trained for Army Television, the US Senate, the Joint Chiefs of Staff, the Federal Emergency Management Agency (FEMA), and produced programming for communications/technology companies, universities, biotech and pharmaceutical companies.

== Awards ==
1988 Collegiate Academy of Arts and Sciences Citation of Excellence for Experimental Video Production. --- Production "The Anti-Video" --- Role Producer/Director

1989 Collegiate Academy of Arts and Sciences Citation of Excellence for Experimental Video Production. --- Production "The Computer Analyst" --- Role Producer/Director

1989 Peabody Award Client MTV,--- Show “Decade” --- Role Segment Editor

1992 Peabody Award Client MTV, --- Project “Choose or Lose.” (PSA Campaign) --- Role Online Editor

1996 Cartagena Film Festival Award for best documentary --- Client World Bank Production “With Hope and Dignity”--- Role Online Edit and Animation/Graphics

2005 APEX Award --- Client The Degge Group/LeapFrog Solutions --- Project “Conquering Cancer Network” --- Role Audio and Video Producer/Director
