= Student Academy Awards =

Competition for college and university filmmakers

- Awarded for: Excellence in student cinematic achievements
- Country: United States
- Presented by: Academy of Motion Picture Arts and Sciences
- First award: December 20, 1973; 52 years ago (as Student Film Awards)
- Website: oscars.org/saa

The Student Academy Awards are presented by the Academy of Motion Picture Arts and Sciences. It is an annual awards program for college and university filmmakers.

== Description ==
The awards were originally named the Student Film Awards and were first presented in 1973. The current name was adopted in 1991. Since 1975, the awards have been given annually. The event has been held in October since 2017, and in most years has been presented at the Samuel Goldwyn Theater in Beverly Hills, California.

The awards offer prizes in four categories: alternative (experimental film), animation, documentary, and narrative. Gold, silver, and bronze awards are given in each category. From 1981 until 2021, separate awards were given annually to a student filmmaker from outside the United States, starting in the 49th Student Academy Awards in 2022, the Academy merged its domestic and international categories. This reduced the seven categories (four domestic and three international) into four categories for narrative, animation, alternative/experimental, and documentary.

Several award winners would have significant achievement as filmmakers, including Robert Zemeckis, Bob Saget, Spike Lee, Trey Parker, Pete Docter and John Lasseter. Some of the student films that won the awards have themselves been nominated for or won the Academy Award in the short film categories, including Chicks in White Satin, The Janitor, Karl Hess: Toward Liberty, The Lunch Date, 9, Quiero ser (I want to be...), Gang Cops, The Death of Kevin Carter: Casualty of the Bang Bang Club, The Red Jacket, On the Line (Auf der Strecke), God of Love, The Confession, 4.1 Miles An Ostrich Told Me the World Is Fake and I Think I Believe It, Butcher's Stain and Dcera (Daughter).

Copies (and some elements) for over 90% of films honored with Student Academy Awards, along with recordings of many of the awards ceremonies, are held by the Academy Film Archive.

In 2024, the 51st Student Academy Awards were held in London, and in 2025, the 52nd ceremony was held in New York City in the Ziegfeld Ballroom. The 2026 edition will be held in Toronto as part of the 2026 Toronto International Film Festival.

The Student Academy Awards are sponsored by Rolex.

== List of winners ==
=== 1970s ===
==== 1st Annual Student Film Awards – December 20, 1973 ====
- Animation: Anti-matter, Lewis Hall, Carlos Guiterrez-Mena – University of California, Los Angeles (Los Angeles)
  - Nominees: Cosmic Cartoon, Steven Lisberger, Eric Ladd – Boston University (Boston)
- Documentary: You See, I've Had a Life, Ben Levin, Mort Jordan – Temple University (Philadelphia, Pennsylvania)
- Dramatic: Manhattan Melody, Reuben Trane, Ken Wiederhorn – Columbia University (New York City)
- Special Jury (Dramatic): Norman Nurdelpick's Suspension: A Tribute to Alfred Hitchcock, Bob Dahlin – Northwestern University (Evanston, Illinois)

==== 2nd Annual Student Film Awards – July 1, 1975 ====
- Animation: Euphoria, Vincent Collins – San Francisco Art Institute (San Francisco)
- Documentary: Men's Lives, Josh Hanig, Will Roberts – Antioch College (Yellow Springs, Ohio)
- Dramatic: Swag, Bruce Postman – New York University School of the Arts (New York City)
- Experimental: Architecture of the Petroleum Age, Scott Thomas – Rice University (Houston, Texas)
- Special Jury (Dramatic): A Field of Honor, Robert Zemeckis – University of Southern California (Los Angeles)

==== 3rd Annual Student Film Awards – June 23, 1976 ====
- Animation: Fame, Mark Kirkland, Richard Jefferies – California Institute of the Arts (Valencia, California)
- Documentary: What the Notes Say Karen Grossman, Richard O'Neill – Adelphi University (Garden City, New York)
- Dramatic: The Preparatory, Terence Cahalan – University of Southern California (Los Angeles)
- Experimental: After Lumiere, Joan Laine – University of California, Los Angeles (Los Angeles)
- Special Jury (Documentary): The American Love Affair, Lee M. Rhoads, Jr. – University of Southern California (Los Angeles)

==== 4th Annual Student Film Awards – May 22, 1977 ====
- Animation: The Muse, Paul W. Demeyer – California Institute of the Arts (Valencia, California)
- Documentary:
  - Achievement: The Last of the Little Breweries, Frank H. Binney – University of Texas at Austin (Austin, Texas)
  - Merit: Guitar Craft, Rob Williams – Western States Film Institute and Metropolitan State College of Denver (both in Denver, Colorado)
- Dramatic: Sixteen Down, Carol L. Dysinger – New York University (New York City)
- Experimental: TRANSCENdance, Philip W. Pura – Boston University (Boston, Massachusetts)

==== 5th Annual Student Film Awards – May 21, 1978 ====
- Animation: Mother Goose, David Bishop – University of Southern California (Los Angeles)
- Documentary:
  - Achievement: The Sixth Week, John Simeon Block – New York University (New York City)
  - Merit: Like Any Child, Only More So, Catherine Allan, Maile Ornellas – University of California, Berkeley (Berkeley, California)
  - Merit: Through Adam's Eyes, Robert Saget – Temple University, (Philadelphia, Pennsylvania)
- Dramatic: Button, Button, Burton Lee Harry – University of Bridgeport (Bridgeport, Connecticut)
- Experimental: Triptych, Matthew Patrick – Hampshire College (Amherst, Massachusetts)

==== 6th Annual Student Film Awards – June 3, 1979 ====
- Animation:
  - Achievement: Lady and the Lamp John Lasseter – California Institute of the Arts (Valencia, California)
  - Merit: The Walrus and the Carpenter, Tomas Gasek, Malcolm G. Spaull – Rochester Institute of Technology (Henrietta, New York)
- Documentary:
  - Achievement: Since '45, Michael David Korolenko – Boston University (Boston, Massachusetts)
  - Merit: Cotton Candy and Elephant Stuff, Jan Krawitz, Thomas Ott – Temple University (Philadelphia, Pennsylvania)
  - Merit: Everybody Needs a Forever Home, Mike Simpson – University of Texas at Austin (Austin, Texas)
- Dramatic: The Writers, Harriotte H. Aaron – New York University (New York City)

=== 1980s ===
==== 7th Annual Student Film Awards – June 8, 1980 ====
- Animation: Nitemare, John Lasseter – California Institute of the Arts
- Documentary:
  - Achievement: Karl Hess: Toward Liberty, Roland Hallé, Peter W. Ladue – Boston University
  - Merit: Crossroads/South Africa: The Struggle Continues, Jonathan Wacks – University of California, Los Angeles
- Dramatic:
  - Achievement: Candy Store, Claude Kerven – New York University
  - Honorary: Happy Birthday, Randall Fried – University of Southern California
  - Merit: Murder in a Mist, Lisa Gottlieb – Columbia College Chicago (Chicago, Illinois)
- Experimental: Sections, Sean Phillips – University of Southern California

==== 8th Annual Student Film Awards – June 7, 1981 ====
- Animation: A Bird's Eye View, Deborah Jo Short – San Francisco State University
- Documentary:
  - Achievement: I Remember Barbra, Kevin Burns – Boston University
  - Merit: Jazz, Albert Magnoli – University of Southern California
- Dramatic:
  - Achievement: A Man Around the House, Caroline Emmons – New York University
  - Merit: Willie, Coleen Higgins, Ghasem Ebrahimian – State University of New York at Purchase
- Experimental: Commuter, Michael M. Patterson – California Institute of the Arts
- Foreign Student Film: Maedeli la brèche, Jaco Van Dormael – Institut National Superieur, Belgium

==== 9th Annual Student Film Awards – June 6, 1982 ====
- Animation:
  - Achievement: Guess Who's for Dinner, Kathy Zielinski – California Institute of the Arts
  - Merit: The Taming, Bill Jarcho – Emerson College
- Documentary: Face Value, Michael Kriegsman, Dan Montopoli – New York University
- Dramatic: For Heaven's Sake, Ken Kwapis – University of Southern California
- Foreign Student Film: Zone Surveillee (Monitored Zone), Olivier Langlois – Institut National Superieur, Belgium

==== 10th Annual Student Film Awards – June 5, 1983 ====
- Animation: No One for Chess, Richard Rosser – Washington and Lee University
- Documentary:
  - Achievement: The Four Corners: A National Sacrifice Area?, Christopher McLeod, Glenn Switkes – University of California, Berkeley
  - Merit: El Matador, Arturo Ruiz Esparza – University of Texas at Austin
  - Merit: Where Did You Get That Woman, Loretta Smith – Columbia College (Chicago, Illinois)
- Dramatic:
  - Achievement: American Taboo, Steve Lustgarten – Portland State University
  - Merit: Children of the Corn, John Robert Woodward, Johnny Stevens – University of Texas at Austin
  - Merit: Joe's Bed-Stuy Barbershop: We Cut Heads, Spike Lee – New York University
- Experimental: Somnolent Blue, Monica Kendall – School of the Art Institute of Chicago
- Foreign Student Film: Over My Dead Body, Ingrid Oustrup Jensen – National Film School of Denmark

==== 11th Annual Student Film Awards – June 10, 1984 ====
- Animation:
  - Achievement: The White Gazelle, Anthony Laudati – State University of New York at Purchase
  - Merit: Mr. Gloom, William G. Kopp – California Institute of the Arts
- Documentary:
  - Achievement: Rodin's Balzac, Marilyn Waterman – Stanford University
  - Merit: The Wizard of the Strings, Alan Edelstein, Peter Friedman – New York University
- Dramatic:
  - Achievement: Minors, Alan Kingsberg – New York University
  - Merit: The Lottery Rose, Gregory Popp, Frank Military – Northwestern University
- Experimental: Tuscola Moon, Dan Reed – University of Illinois at Chicago
- Foreign Student Film: Mother's Wedding, Jenny Wilkes – National Film and Television School, Beaconsfield, Buckinghamshire, England

==== 12th Annual Student Film Awards – June 16, 1985 ====
- Animation: Observational Hazard, William G. Kopp – California Institute of the Arts
- Documentary:
  - Achievement: Burley: Growing Tobacco in America, Robert Henson, Doron Schlair – New York University
  - Merit: On the Rocks, Kathryn Johnston, Iain C. Stobie – University of Colorado at Boulder
  - Merit: Witness to Revolution: The Story of Anna Louise Strong, Lucy Ostrander – Stanford University
- Dramatic: Heroes, Camille Thomasson – University of Southern California
- Foreign Student Film: The Leahys: Music Most of All, Peter Weyman – York University, Toronto, Canada

==== 13th Annual Student Film Awards – June 8, 1986 ====
- Animation:
  - Achievement: Housecats, Peg McClure Moudy – De Anza College, Cupertino, California
  - Merit: Mangia!, Sheila Sofian – Rhode Island School of Design
- Documentary:
  - Achievement: Songs of Wool: Vena Tipton's Hooked Rugs, Cathey Edwards – California Institute of the Arts
  - Merit: The Flapper Story, Lauren Lazin – Stanford University
  - Merit: Sam, Aaron D. Weisblatt – New York University
- Dramatic:
  - Achievement: Jenny, John Travers – University of Bridgeport, Connecticut
  - Merit: Chicken Thing, Todd Holland – University of California, Los Angeles
- Experimental: The Three Cornered Hat, Angel Gracia – Miami Dade Community College
- Foreign Student Film: Come, I Have a Story To Tell You, Frederic Roullier-Gall – Institut National Superieur des Arts du Spectacle et Techniques de Diffusion, Belgium

==== 14th Annual Student Film Awards – June 7, 1987 ====
- Animation: Husband of Rat's Daughter, Karen McCoy Fremuth – Rhode Island School of Design
- Documentary:
  - Achievement: Silver into Gold, Lynn Mueller – Stanford University
  - Honorary: Living with AIDS, Tina DiFeliciantonio – Stanford University
  - Merit: In the Wee Wee Hours, Izak Ben-Meir – University of Southern California
- Dramatic:
  - Achievement: Bird in a Cage, Antonio Zarro – CBN University
  - Merit: Prelude, James Spione – State University of New York at Purchase
- Experimental: Zebu, William Mitchell – Loyola Marymount University, Los Angeles
- Foreign Student Film: See You at Wembley, Frankie Walsh, Mark Herman – National Film and Television School, Beaconsfield, England

==== 15th Annual Student Film Awards – June 12, 1988 ====
- Animation:
  - Achievement: Cat & Rat, James Richardson – Columbia College (Chicago, Illinois)
  - Merit: Artistic Vision, Richard Quade – University of California, Los Angeles
  - Merit: Cat's Cradle, Temah Nelson – Rhode Island School of Design
  - Merit: Why, Suzanne Dimant – California Institute of the Arts
- Documentary:
  - Achievement: Gang Cops, Thomas B. Fleming, Daniel Marks – University of Southern California
  - Merit: Norma Jean, John H Behnke – Southern Illinois University
- Dramatic:
  - Achievement: Part VII, Thomas Wallin, Steve Wang – New York University
- Experimental:
  - Achievement: The Anti-Video, Gary Rosenthal – Ithaca College
- Foreign Student Film: Schmetterlinge (Butterflies), Wolfgang Becker – Deutsche Film- und Fernsehakademie Berlin, Berlin, West Germany

==== 16th Annual Student Film Awards – June 11, 1989 ====
- Animation:
  - Achievement: Sand Dance, Richard Quade – University of California, Los Angeles
  - Merit: All in Your Mind, Richard C. Zimmerman – Southern Illinois University
  - Merit: The Chore, Joe Murray – De Anza College
- Documentary:
  - Achievement: Leila, Shawn Maurer – Loyola Marymount University
  - Merit: Just Like It Was, Dave Burkhardt – Bob Jones University
  - Merit: No Hunger in My Home, Nancy Brink – Stanford University
- Dramatic:
  - Achievement: The Yuppie, John H. Behnke, James M. Peterson – Southern Illinois University
  - Merit: Summer Rain, Howard Slavitt – University of Southern California
- Experimental:
  - Achievement: The Lost Treasure of Captain Cornelius "Deadeye" Tuckett, John Michael Di Jiacomo – New York University
  - Merit: The Computer Analyst, Gary Rosenthal – Ithaca College
- Foreign Student Film: Ropáci (Oilgobblers), Jan Svěrák – Film and TV School of the Academy of Performing Arts in Prague, Prague, Czechoslovakia

=== 1990s ===
==== 17th Annual Student Film Awards – June 10, 1990 ====
- Animation:
  - Achievement: Watunna, Stacey Steers – University of Colorado at Boulder
  - Merit: The Yodel Contest, Andrew Artz – University of California, Los Angeles
- Documentary:
  - Achievement: Clowning Around, Kelly Clement, Ellen Osborne – San Francisco State University
  - Merit: Alf Landon: My Talk with Papa, Richard Kassebaum – University of Southern California
  - Merit: Samsara: Death and Rebirth in Cambodia, Ellen Bruno – Stanford University
- Dramatic:
  - Achievement: The Lunch Date, Adam Davidson – Columbia University, New York City
  - Merit: The Blue Men, Denise McKenna, Mark Squier – American Film Institute, Los Angeles
  - Merit: Go to Hell, Suzanne V. Johnson – Tisch School of the Arts, New York University
- Foreign Student Film: Alaska, Mike van Diem – Netherlands Film and Television Academy (Amsterdam, Netherlands
- Directors Guild of America Student Award: Adam Davidson

==== 18th Annual Student Academy Awards – June 9, 1991 ====
- Animation:
  - Gold Medal: Ode to G.I. Joe, Gregory P. Grant – Brooks Institute
- Documentary:
  - Gold Medal: Twinsburge, OH: Some Kind of Weird Twin Thing, Sue Marcoux – Stanford University
- Dramatic:
  - Gold Medal: The Dog Ate It, Steve Pearl – Loyola Marymount University
  - Silver Medal: Turtle Races, Jim Lincoln, Lisa Swain – Regent University
  - Bronze Medal: Andy's Got a Girlfriend!, Dan Moran, Joel Kuchan – Columbia College Chicago (Chicago, Illinois)
- Foreign Film Award: Once Upon a Time, Zsuzsa Böszörményi – Academy of Drama and Film in Budapest, Budapest
- Directors Guild of America Student Award: Steve Pearl

==== 19th Annual Student Academy Awards – June 14, 1992 ====
- Animation:
  - Gold Medal: Next Door, Peter H. Docter – California Institute of the Arts
  - Silver Medal: Five Female Persuasions, Peter Hixson – American University
  - Bronze Medal: Fur and Feathers, Celia Kendrick – Rhode Island School of Design
- Documentary:
  - Gold Medal: Beyond Imagining: Margaret Anderson and the Little Review, Wendy Weinberg – Temple University
  - Silver Medal: Dolphins: Minds in the Water, Christopher C. Carson – Loyola Marymount University
  - Bronze Medal: In and Out of Time, Elizabeth Finlayson – Stanford University
- Dramatic:
  - Gold Medal: The Lady in Waiting, Christian M. Taylor – New York University
  - Silver Medal: Eagle Against the Sun, John Akahoshi, Steve Foonberg – University of Southern California
  - Bronze Medal: Gold Mountain, Rachel Saltz, Kryssa Schemmerling – Columbia University
- Experimental Award:
  - Gold Medal: In the Aquarium, Robert Beebe – University of California, Los Angeles
- Foreign Film Award: This Boy's Story, John Roberts, Michele Camarda – National Film and Television School, Beaconsfield, England
- Directors Guild of America Student Award: Christian M. Taylor

==== 20th Annual Student Academy Awards – June 13, 1993 ====
- Animation:
  - Gold Medal: Above Average, Jamie Maxfield – Rhode Island School of Design
  - Silver Medal: American History, Chris Graves, Trey Parker – University of Colorado at Boulder
  - Bronze Medal: The Wind, Drew King – California Institute of the Arts
- Documentary:
  - Gold Medal: Living Forward, Looking Back, Stephanie L. Hill – New York University
  - Silver Medal: Chicks in White Satin, Elaine Holliman – University of Southern California
- Dramatic:
  - Gold Medal: A Children's Story, Graham Justice – New York University
  - Silver Medal: Silent Rain, Martin Curland – University of Southern California
- Experimental Award:
  - Gold Medal: The Strange Case of Balthazar Hyppolite, Ethan Spigland – New York University
  - Silver Medal: Seven Lucky Charms, Lisa Mann – California Institute of the Arts
- Foreign Film Award: The Last New Year, Javier Bourges – Centro de Capacitación Cinematográfica, Mexico City, Mexico
- Directors Guild of America Student Award: Graham Justice

==== 21st Annual Student Academy Awards – June 12, 1994 ====
- Animation:
  - Gold Medal: The Janitor, Vanessa Stella Schwartz – California Institute of the Arts
  - Silver Medal: Foodchain, Brian P. Dowrick – University of the Arts, Philadelphia, Pennsylvania
- Documentary:
  - Gold Medal: Genbaku Shi: Killed by the Atomic Bomb, Casey G. Williams – University of Utah
  - Silver Medal: Portrait of Boy with Dog, Robin Hessman, James Longley – Brown University, Wesleyan University
  - Bronze Medal: Street Songs: Pittsburgh Street Singer Bill Dorsey, Craig McTurk – California Institute of the Arts
- Dramatic:
  - Gold Medal: Red, Gary Nadeau – New York University
  - Silver Medal: Outside, Matt Danciger – Art Center College of Design, Pasadena, California
  - Bronze Medal: The Make, Stephen James – Columbia University
- Foreign Film Award: Abgeschminkt (Making Up!), Katja von Garnier – University of Television and Film Munich, Munich, Germany
- Directors Guild of America Student Award: Matt Danciger

==== 22nd Annual Student Academy Awards – June 11, 1995 ====
- Alternative:
  - Gold Medal: Picasso Would Have Made a Glorious Waiter, Jonathan Schell – New York University
- Animation:
  - Gold Medal: Card Trick, Robert Herrick Russ – University of California, San Diego
- Documentary:
  - Gold Medal: Their Own Vietnam, Nancy D. Kates – Stanford University
  - Silver Medal: Playing the Part, Mitch McCabe – Harvard College, Cambridge, Massachusetts
- Dramatic:
  - Gold Medal: La Ciudad (The City), David Riker – New York University
- Foreign Film Award: Scarborough Ahoy!, Tania Diez – National Film and Television School, Beaconsfield, Buckinghamshire, England
- Directors Guild of America Student Award: David Riker

==== 23rd Annual Student Academy Awards – June 9, 1996 ====
- Animation:
  - Gold Medal: Patronized, Zachary Lehman – Dartmouth College
  - Silver Medal: Return of the Sun Devil, Steven Ayromlooi – Rhode Island School of Design
- Documentary:
  - Gold Medal: Independent Little Cuss, Jeff Patterson – Loyola Marymount University
  - Silver Medal: Just for the Ride, Amanda Micheli – Harvard University
  - Bronze Medal: Spirits Rising, Ramona S. Diaz – Stanford University
- Dramatic
  - Gold Medal: The Water Carrier, Patricia Cardoso – University of California, Los Angeles
  - Silver Medal: Short Change, Jon Andrews – Yale University
  - Bronze Medal: Around the Time, Phil Bertelsen – New York University
- Alternative:
  - Gold Medal: Eclipse, Jason Ruscio – New York University
  - Silver Medal: Memories of Matthews Place, Daniel Bova – New York University
- Foreign Film Award: Grænsen (Never), Reza Parsa – National Film School of Denmark
- Directors Guild of America Student Award: Patricia Cardoso

==== 24th Annual Student Academy Awards – June 8, 1997 ====
- Alternative:
  - Gold Medal: Erosion, Robert Gelber – New York University
  - Silver Medal: My Divorce, Andrea Clark – New York University
- Animation:
  - Gold Medal: Unborn Baby Blues, Mark Dale Levine – University of California, Los Angeles
- Documentary:
  - Gold Medal: Walk This Way, Chris Sheridan – Scottsdale Community College
  - Silver Medal: Miriam Is Not Amused, Kim Roberts – Stanford University
  - Bronze Medal: The Mirror Lied, Jennifer Haskin-O'Reggio – University of Southern California
- Dramatic:
  - Gold Medal: Christmas in New York, Mark Millhone – Columbia University
  - Silver Medal: Waiting in the Wings, Charles R. Uy – School of Visual Arts, New York City
  - Bronze Medal: Mr. October, Chris Angel – University of Southern California
- Foreign Film Award: An Ordinary Mission, Raymond Boy – Academy of Media Arts, Cologne, Germany
- Directors Guild of America Student Award: Charles R. Uy

==== 25th Annual Student Academy Awards – June 14, 1998 ====
- Alternative
  - Gold Medal: Sombra, Robin Larsen – University of California, Los Angeles
- Animation:
  - Gold Medal: Jataka, Peter Choe, Neal Nellans – Ringling School of Art and Design, Sarasota, Florida
  - Silver Medal: Switchback, Kyle Clark – University of Southern California
  - Bronze Medal: Put On a Happy Face, Suzanne Lee Twining – University of the Arts, Philadelphia, Pennsylvania
- Documentary:
  - Gold Medal: Fighting Grandpa, Greg Pak – New York University
  - Silver Medal: Occidental Encounters, Yuriko Gamo Romer – Stanford University
  - Bronze Medal: Wayne Freedman's Notebook, Aaron Lubarsky – Stanford University
- Dramatic:
  - Gold Medal: Bleach, Bill Platt – New York University
  - Silver Medal: My Body, Joel Moffett, Matthias Visser – American Film Institute
  - Bronze Medal: Intermezzo, Dana H. Glazer – New York University
- Foreign Film Award: Rochade, Thorsten Schmidt – Film Academy Baden-Württemberg (Ludwigsburg, Baden-Württemberg, Germany)
- Directors Guild of America Student Award: Bill Platt

==== 26th Annual Student Academy Awards – June 13, 1999 ====
- Alternative:
  - Gold Medal: Tree Shade, Lisa Collins – Columbia University, New York City
  - Silver Medal: The Piece, Jordan Waid – The New School, New York City
  - Bronze Medal: Atomic Tobasco, James Cox – New York University
  - Bronze Medal: Gregory, Marston Younger – Allan Hancock College
- Animation:
  - Gold Medal: A Letter from the Western Front, Daniel M. Kanemoto – New York University
  - Silver Medal: Between the Lines, Jamie Maxfield – California Institute of the Arts
  - Bronze Medal: Shadow of a Drought, Daniel Kutner, Brian Emerson – University of California, Santa Barbara
- Documentary:
  - Gold Medal: Man and Dog, Randolph Benson – North Carolina School of the Arts
- Narrative:
  - Gold Medal: John, Marni Banack, J. B. Sugar – American Film Institute
  - Silver Medal: True Confessions of a Sushi Addict, Kimberly Harwood – New York University
  - Bronze Medal: Slow Dancin' Down the Aisles of the Quickcheck, Thomas Wade Jackson – Florida State University
- Foreign Film Award: Kleingeld (Small Change), Marc-Andreas Bochert – Konrad Wolf Film University of Babelsberg, Germany
- Directors Guild of America Student Award: Marni Banack
- American Society of Cinematographers Student Award: David A. Armstrong

=== 2000s ===
==== 27th Annual Student Academy Awards – June 11, 2000 ====
- Alternative:
  - Gold Medal: Helicopter, Ari Gold – New York University
  - Silver Medal: Dear Sir: Letters to a Union Soldier, Michael Mullan, Jessica Lakis – University of the Arts, Philadelphia, Pennsylvania
- Animation:
  - Gold Medal: Al Tudi Tuhak (Long, Long Ago), Tod Polson – California Institute of the Arts
  - Silver Medal (tie): The Bad Plant, Amy Winfrey – University of California, Los Angeles
  - Silver Medal (tie): Luz, Jose Javier Martinez – University of California, Los Angeles
- Documentary:
  - Gold Medal: Iron Ladies, Kennedy Wheatley – University of Southern California
  - Silver Medal: Slender Existence, Laura C. Murray – Stanford University, Palo Alto, California
  - Bronze Medal: Between Two Fires, Douglas Noel Smith – Regent University, Virginia, Virginia
- Narrative:
  - Gold Medal: One Day Crossing, Joan L. Stein – Columbia University
  - Silver Medal: Homeland, Doug Scott – New York University
  - Bronze Medal: 6 Miles of 8 Feet, Ben Tomlin – New York University
- Foreign: Quiero ser, Florian Gallenberger – University of Television and Film Munich, Germany
- Directors Guild of America Student Award: Joan L. Stein

==== 28th Annual Student Academy Awards – June 10, 2001 ====
- Alternative:
  - Gold Medal: Warmth, Michael Schaerer – School of Visual Arts, New York City
- Animation:
  - Gold Medal: Boobie Girl, Brooke Keesling – California Institute of the Arts
  - Silver Medal: The Yellow Umbrella, Victor Robert, Rodney Hom – Art Center College of Design, Pasadena, California
  - Bronze Medal: That Special Monkey, Sean McBride – University of the Arts, Philadelphia, Pennsylvania
- Documentary:
  - Gold Medal: XXXY, Porter Gale, Laleh Soomekh – Stanford University, Palo Alto, California
  - Silver Medal: Green, Laura Dunn – University of Texas at Austin
  - Bronze Medal: Undesirables, Marianna Yarovskaya – University of Southern California, Los Angeles
- Narrative:
  - Gold Medal: Zen and the Art of Landscaping, David Kartch – Columbia University
  - Silver Medal: The Confession, Carl Pfirman – University of California, Los Angeles
  - Bronze Medal: Lector, Greg Marcks – Florida State University, Tallahassee
- Foreign Film Award: The Eye on the Nape (El ojo en la nuca), Rodrigo Pla – Centro de Capacitación Cinematográfica (Mexico City, Mexico)

==== 29th Annual Student Academy Awards – June 9, 2002 ====
- Alternative:
  - Gold Medal: For Our Man, Kazuo Ohno – Columbia University
  - Silver Medal: Island to Island, Soopum Sohn – New York University
- Animation:
  - Gold Medal: Passing Moments, Don Phillips, Jr. – Ringling School of Art and Design
  - Silver Medal: The Velvet Tigress, Jen Sachs – California Institute of the Arts, Valencia
  - Bronze Medal: Shadowplay, Dan Blank – New York University
- Documentary:
  - Gold Medal: Moving House, Pin Pin Tan – Northwestern University
  - Silver Medal: Family Values, Eva Saks – New York University
  - Bronze Medal: Revolutions Per Minute, Thomas Burns – Stanford University, Palo Alto, California
- Narrative:
  - Gold Medal: The Wormhole, Jessica Sharzer – New York University
  - Silver Medal: Barrier Device, Grace Lee – University of California, Los Angeles
  - Bronze Medal: Sophie Helen, Haeyoung Lee – University of Texas at Austin
- Foreign Film Award: Feeding Desire, Martin Strange-Hansen – National Film School of Denmark, Denmark

==== 30th Annual Student Academy Awards – June 8, 2003 ====
- Alternative:
  - Gold Medal: The Projects Lumiere, Waleed Moursi – California Institute of the Arts
- Animation:
  - Gold Medal: Perpetual Motion, Kimberly Miner – Rochester Institute of Technology
  - Silver Medal: Bert, Moonsung Lee – Academy of Art College, San Francisco.
  - Bronze Medal: A Work in Progress, Wes Ball – Florida State University, Tallahassee
- Documentary:
  - Gold Medal: Left Behind, Christof Putzel – Connecticut College
  - Silver Medal: Indiana Aria, Elizabeth Pollock – University of California, Berkeley
  - Bronze Medal: Those Who Trespass, Renee Fischer – Stanford University, Palo Alto, California
- Narrative:
  - Gold Medal: La Milpa (The Cornfield), Patricia Riggen – Columbia University
  - Silver Medal: Jesus Henry Christ, Dennis Lee – Columbia University, New York City
  - Bronze Medal: Fine., Michael Downing, Philip Svoboda – American Film Institute, California
- Foreign Film Award: The Red Jacket, Florian Baxmeyer – University of Hamburg, Germany

==== 31st Annual Student Academy Awards – June 13, 2004 ====
- Alternative:
  - Gold Medal: The Storyboard of My Life, Robert F. Castillo – School of Visual Arts
  - Silver Medal: Focus, Bill Ridlehoover, Nilanjan Neil Lahiri – Savannah College of Art and Design, Georgia
- Animation:
  - Gold Medal: Rex Steele: Nazi Smasher, Alexander Woo – New York University
  - Silver Medal: Rock the World, Sukwon Shin – School of Visual Arts, New York City
  - Bronze Medal: Lemmings, Craig Van Dyke – BYU Center for Animation, Utah
- Documentary:
  - Gold Medal: Cheerleader, Kimberlee Bassford – University of California, Berkeley
  - Silver Medal: When the Storm Came, Shilpi Gupta – University of California, Berkeley
  - Bronze Medal: Cuba: Illogical Temple, David Pittock, Lindsey Kealy – University of Nebraska–Lincoln
- Narrative:
  - Gold Medal: A-Alike, Randall Dottin – Columbia University
  - Silver Medal: Zeke, Dana Buning – Florida State University, Tallahassee
  - Bronze Medal: The Plunge, Todd Schulman – Florida State University, Tallahassee
- Foreign Film Award: Between Us, Laurits Much-Peterson – National Film School of Denmark, Denmark

==== 32nd Annual Student Academy Awards – June 12, 2005 ====
- Alternative:
  - Gold Medal: Knock Knock, Jaron Henrie-McCrea – Ball State University
  - Silver Medal: Your Dark Hair Ihsan, Tala Hadid – Columbia University
- Animation:
  - Gold Medal: 9, Shane Acker – University of California
  - Silver Medal: Frog, Christopher Conforti – School of Visual Arts, New York City
  - Bronze Medal: Things That Go Bump in the Night, Joshua G. Beveridge – Ringling School of Art and Design, Florida
- Documentary:
  - Gold Medal: The Life of Kevin Carter, Dan Krauss – University of California
  - Silver Medal: Unhitched, Erin Hudso, Ben Wu – Stanford University
  - Bronze Medal: Listen, Kimby Caplan – Southern Methodist University, Texas
- Narrative:
  - Gold Medal: Wednesday Afternoon, Alonso Mayo – American Film Institute
  - Silver Medal: Victoria Para Chino, Cary Fukunaga – New York University
  - Bronze Medal: Charm, Melissa Rossi – Florida State University, Tallahassee
- Foreign Film Award: The Runaway, Ulrike Grote – University of Hamburg, Germany

==== 33rd Annual Student Academy Awards – June 10, 2006 ====
- Alternative:
  - Gold Medal: Perspective, Travis Hatfield, Samuel Day – Ball State University
  - Silver Medal: 6 A.M., Carmen Vidal Balanzat – City College of New York
- Animation:
  - Gold Medal: The Possum, Chris Choy – California Institute of the Arts
  - Silver Medal: The Dancing Thief, Meng Vue – Ringling School of Art and Design
  - Bronze Medal: Turtles, Thomas Leavitt – BYU Center for Animation
- Documentary:
  - Gold Medal: Reporter Zero, Carrie Lozano – University of California, Berkeley
  - Silver Medal: The Women's Kingdom, Xiaoli Zhou – University of California, Berkeley
  - Bronze Medal: Three Beauties, Maksud Hossain – Purdue University
- Narrative:
  - Gold Medal: Christmas Wish List, Sean Overbeeke – University of North Carolina
  - Silver Medal: El Viaje (One Day Trip), Cady Abarca-Benavides – Columbia University
  - Bronze Medal: Pop Foul, Moon Molson, Jennifer Handorf – Columbia University
- Foreign Film Award: Elalini, Tristan Holmes – South African School of Motion Picture Medium and Live Performance, South Africa

==== 34th Annual Student Academy Awards – June 9, 2007 ====
- Alternative:
  - Gold Medal: Fission, Kun-I Chang – School of Visual Arts
- Animation:
  - Gold Medal (tie): Arts Desire, Sarah Wickliffe – New York University
  - Gold Medal (tie): Mirage, Youngwoong Jang – School of Visual Arts
  - Silver Medal: A Leg Up, Bevin Carnes – Ringling College of Art and Design
- Documentary:
  - Gold Medal: Cross Your Eyes Keep Them Wide, Ben Wu – Stanford University
  - Silver Medal: Ladies of the Land, Megan Thompson – New York University
  - Bronze Medal: Lumo, Bent-Jorgen Perlmutt, Nelson Walker III – Columbia University
- Narrative:
  - Gold Medal: Rundown, Patrick Alexander – Florida State University
  - Silver Medal: High Maintenance, Phillip Van – New York University
  - Bronze Medal: Screening, Anthony Green – New York University
- Foreign Film Award: Nevermore, Toke Constantin Hebbeln – Film Academy Baden-Württemberg, Germany

==== 35th Annual Student Academy Awards – June 7, 2008 ====
- Alternative:
  - Gold Medal: Viola: The Traveling Rooms of a Little Giant, Shih-Ting Hung – University of Southern California
  - Silver Medal: Circles of Confusion, Phoebe Tooke – San Francisco State University
- Animation:
  - Gold Medal: Zoologic, Nicole Mitchell – California Institute of the Arts
  - Silver Medal: Simulacra, Tatchapon Lertwirojkul – School of Visual Arts, New York City
  - Bronze Medal: The Visionary, Evan Mayfield – Ringling College of Art and Design, Florida
- Documentary:
  - Gold Medal: As We Forgive, Laura Waters Hinson – American University, Washington, D.C.
  - Silver Medal: Unattached, J.J. Adler – Columbia University
  - Bronze Medal: If a Body Meet a Body, Brian Golden Davis – University of Southern California
- Narrative:
  - Gold Medal: A Day's Work, Rajeev Dassani – University of Southern California
  - Silver Medal: The State of Sunshine, Z. Eric Yang – Florida State University
  - Bronze Medal: Pitstop, Melanie McGraw – University of Southern California
- Foreign Film Award: On the Line (Auf der Strecke), Reto Caffi – Academy of Media Arts Cologne, Germany

==== 36th Annual Student Academy Awards – June 13, 2009 ====
Site: Samuel Goldwyn Theater

- Alternative:
  - Gold Medal: Alice's Attic, Robyn Yannoukos – University of California Los Angeles
  - Silver Medal: Matter, In a Quiescent State, Prepares Itself to Be Transformed, Kwibum Chung – School of Visual Arts, New York City
- Animation:
  - Gold Medal: Pajama Gladiator, Glenn Harmon – BYU Center for Animation
  - Silver Medal: Sebastian’s Voodoo, Joaquin Baldwin – University of California, Los Angeles
  - Bronze Medal: Kites, Jed Henry – BYU Center for Animation
- Documentary:
  - Gold Medal: The Last Mermaids, Liz Chae – Columbia University
  - Silver Medal: The Wait, Cassandra Lizaire, Kelly Asmuth – Columbia University, New York City
  - Bronze Medal: A Place to Land, Lauren DeAngelis – American University, Washington, D.C.
- Narrative:
  - Gold Medal: Kavi, Gregg Helvey – University of Southern California
  - Silver Medal: The Bronx Balletomane, Jeremy Joffee – City College of New York
  - Bronze Medal: Bohemibot, Brendan Bellomo – New York University
- Foreign Film Award: Elkland, Per Hanefjord – Swedish Institute of Dramatic Art, Sweden

=== 2010s ===
==== 37th Annual Student Academy Awards – June 12, 2010 ====
Site: Samuel Goldwyn Theater

- Alternative:
  - Gold Medal: Surface: Film from Below, Varathit Uthaisri – Parsons The New School for Design
  - Silver Medal: Multiply, Emily Henricks – University of Southern California
- Animation:
  - Gold Medal: Departure of Love, Jennifer Bors – Ringling College of Art and Design
  - Silver Medal: Dried Up, Isaiah Powers, Stuart Bury and Jeremy Casper – Kansas City Art Institute
  - Bronze Medal: Lifeline, Andres Salaff – California Institute of the Arts
- Documentary:
  - Gold Medal: Yizkor (Remembrance), Ruth Fertig – University of Texas at Austin
  - Silver Medal: Rediscovering Pape, Maria Royo – City College of New York
  - Bronze Medal: Dreams Awake (Suena Despierto), Kevin Gordon and Rebekah Meredith – Stanford University
- Narrative:
  - Gold Medal: God of Love, Luke Matheny – New York University
  - Silver Medal: Down in Number 5, Kim Spurlock – New York University
  - Bronze Medal: The Lunch Box, Lubomir Kocka – Savannah College of Art and Design
- Foreign Film Award: The Confession, Tanel Toom – National Film and Television School, United Kingdom

==== 38th Annual Student Academy Awards – June 11, 2011 ====
Site: Samuel Goldwyn Theater

- Alternative:
  - Gold Medal: The Vermeers, Tal S. Shamir – The New School
- Animation:
  - Gold Medal: Dragonboy, Bernardo Warman and Shaofu Zhang – Academy of Art University
  - Gold Medal: Correspondence, Zach Hyer – Pratt Institute
  - Bronze Medal: Defective Detective, Avner Geller and Stevie Lewis – Ringling College of Art and Design
- Documentary:
  - Gold Medal: Vera Klement: Blunt Edge, Wonjung Bae – Columbia College
  - Silver Medal: Imaginary Circumstances, Anthony Weeks – Stanford University
  - Bronze Medal: Sin Pais (Without Country), Theo Rigby – Stanford University
- Foreign Film Award:
  - Gold Medal: Tuba Atlantic, Halvar Witzø – Norwegian Film School, Norway
  - Silver Medal: Bekas, Karzan Kader – Stockholm Academy of Dramatic Arts, Sweden
  - Bronze Medal: Raju, Max Zähle – Hamburg Media School, Germany
- Narrative:
  - Gold Medal: Thief, Julian Higgins – American Film Institute
  - Silver Medal: High Maintenance, Shawn Wines – Columbia University
  - Bronze Medal: Fatakra, Soham Mehta – University of Texas at Austin

==== 39th Annual Student Academy Awards – June 9, 2012 ====
Site: Samuel Goldwyn Theater

- Alternative:
  - Gold Medal: The Reality Clock, Amanda Tasse – University of Southern California
- Animation:
  - Gold Medal: Eyrie, David Wolter – California Institute of the Arts
  - Silver Medal:The Jockstrap Raiders, Mark Nelson – University of California, Los Angeles
  - Bronze Medal:My Little Friend, Eric Prah – Ringling College of Art and Design
- Documentary:
  - Gold Medal: Dying Green, Ellen Tripler – American University
  - Silver Medal: Hiro: A Story of Japanese Internment, Keiko Wright – New York University
  - Bronze Medal: Lost Country, Heather Burky – Art Institute of Jacksonville
- Narrative:
  - Gold Medal: Under, Mark Raso – Columbia University
  - Silver Medal: Narcocorrido, Ryan Prows – American Film Institute
  - Bronze Medal: Nani, Justin Tipping – American Film Institute
- Foreign Film Award:
  - Gold Medal: For Elsie, David Winstone – University of Westminster, United Kingdom
  - Silver Medal: Of Dogs and Horses, Thomas Stuber – Film Academy Baden-Württemberg, Germany
  - Bronze Medal: The Swing of the Coffin Maker, Elmar Imanov – Internationale Filmschule Köln, Cologne, Germany

==== 40th Annual Student Academy Awards – June 8, 2013 ====
Site: Samuel Goldwyn Theater

- Alternative:
  - Gold Medal: Bottled Up, Raffy Cortina – Occidental College
  - Silver Medal: Zug, Perry Janes – University of Michigan
  - Bronze Medal: The Compositor, John Mattiuzzi – School of Visual Arts
- Animation:
  - Gold Medal: Dias de los muertos, Lindsey St. Pierre and Ashley Graham – Ringling College of Art and Design
  - Silver Medal:Will, Eusong Lee – California Institute of the Arts
  - Bronze Medal: Peck Pocketed, Kevin Herron – Ringling College of Art and Design
- Documentary:
  - Gold Medal: A Second Chance, David Aristizabal – University of Southern California
  - Silver Medal: Every Tuesday: A Portrait of the New Yorker Cartoonists, Rachel Loube – School of Visual Arts
  - Bronze Medal: Win or Lose, Daniel Koehler – Elon University
- Narrative:
  - Gold Medal: Ol' Daddy, Brian Schwarz – University of Texas at Austin
  - Silver Medal: Josephine and the Roach, Jonathan Langager – University of Southern California
  - Bronze Medal: Un mundo para Raúl, Mauro Mueller – Columbia University
- Foreign Film Award:
  - Gold Medal: Miss Todd, Kristina Yee – National Film and Television School, United Kingdom
  - Silver Medal: Parvaneh, Talkhon Hamzavi – Zürcher Hochschule der Künste, Fachrichtung Film, Zürich, Switzerland
  - Bronze Medal: Crossroads (Tweesprong), Wouter Bouvijn – RITS School of Arts, Erasmus University College, Belgium

==== 41st Annual Student Academy Awards – June 6, 2014 ====
Site: Samuel Goldwyn Theater

- Alternative:
  - Gold Medal: Person, Drew Brown – The Art Institute of Jacksonville
  - Silver Medal: Oscillate, Daniel Sierra – School of Visual Arts
- Animation:
  - Gold Medal: Owned, Daniel Clark and Wesley Tippetts – BYU Center for Animation
  - Silver Medal:Higher Sky, Teng Cheng – University of Southern California
  - Bronze Medal: Yamashita, Hayley Foster – Loyola Marymount University
- Documentary:
  - Gold Medal: The Apothecary, Helen Hood Scheer – Stanford University
  - Silver Medal: White Earth, J. Christian Jensen – Stanford University
  - Bronze Medal: One Child, Zijian Mu – New York University
- Foreign Film Award:
  - Gold Medal: Nocebo, Lennart Ruff – University of Television and Film Munich, Germany
  - Silver Medal: Paris on the Water, Hadas Ayalon – Tel Aviv University, Israel
  - Bronze Medal: Border Patrol, Peter Baumann – Northern Film School, United Kingdom
- Narrative:
  - Gold Medal: Above the Sea, Keola Racela – Columbia University
  - Silver Medal: Door God, Yulin Liu – New York University
  - Bronze Medal: Interstate, Camille Stochitch – American Film Institute

==== 42nd Annual Student Academy Awards – September 17, 2015 ====
Site: Samuel Goldwyn Theater

- Alternative:
  - Gold Medal: Chiaroscuro, Daniel Drummond – Chapman University
  - Silver Medal: Zoe, ChiHyun Lee – School of Visual Arts
- Animation:
  - Gold Medal: Soar, Alyce Tzue – Academy of Art University
  - Silver Medal:An Object at Rest, Seth Boyden – California Institute of the Arts
  - Bronze Medal: Taking the Plunge, Nicholas Manfredi and Elizabeth Ku-Herrero – School of Visual Arts
- Documentary:
  - Gold Medal: Looking at the Stars, Alexandre Peralta – University of Southern California
  - Silver Medal: I Married My Family’s Killer, Emily Kassie – Brown University
  - Bronze Medal: Boxeadora, Meg Smaker – Stanford University
- Foreign Film Award:
  - Gold Medal: Fidelity, Ilker Çatak – Hamburg Media School, Germany
  - Silver Medal: The Last Will, Dustin Loose – Filmakademie Baden-Wuerttemberg, Germany
  - Bronze Medal: Everything Will Be Okay, Patrick Vollrath – Filmakademie Wien, Austria
- Narrative:
  - Gold Medal: Day One, Henry Hughes, edited by Anisha Acharya – American Film Institute
  - Silver Medal: This Way Up, Jeremy Cloe – American Film Institute
  - Bronze Medal: Stealth, Bennett Lasseter – American Film Institute

==== 43rd Annual Student Academy Awards – September 22, 2016 ====
Site: Samuel Goldwyn Theater

Year	Award	Winners	Nominees	Ref.
2016
2016	Alternative	Gold: All These Voices – David Henry Gerson (American Film Institute); Silver: Cloud Kumo – Yvonne Ng (City College of New York); Bronze: The Swan Girl – Johnny Coffeen (Maharishi University of Management)	Made of Sugar – Kevin Rios (New York University); Nova Initia – Scott Thompson (Art Institute of Colorado)	
2016	Animation	Gold: Once Upon a Line – Alicja Jasina (USC); Silver: The Wishgranter – Echo Wu (Ringling College of Art and Design); Bronze: Die Flucht (The Escape) –Carter Boyce (DePaul University)	Cage – Pengpeng Du (Pratt Institute); Last Shot – Aemilia Widodo (Ringling College of Art and Design); The Controller – Bob Yong and Kang Yung Ho (Ringling College of Art and Design); The Moon is Essentially Gray – Hannah Roman (School of Visual Arts)	
2016	Documentary	Gold: 4.1 Miles – Daphne Matziaraki (University of California, Berkeley); Silver: Fairy Tales – Rongfei Guo (New York University); Bronze: From Flint: Voices of a Poisoned City – Elise Conklin (Michigan State University)	Gardeners of the Forest – Ceylan Carhoglu and Nicole Jordan-Webber (Chapman University); Looking for Trouble – Caroline Cuny and Bryan Campbell (Wake Forest University); The Assassin and Mrs. Paine – Max Good (Stanford University); The Search – Melina Tupa (UC Berkeley)	
2016	Narrative	Gold: Nocturne in Black – Jimmy Keyrouz (Columbia University); Silver: It's Just a Gun – Brian Robau (Chapman University); Bronze: Rocket – Brenna Malloy (Chapman University)	100 Steps – Shahnawaz Zali (Northwestern University); Amelia’s Closet – Halima Lucas University of Southern California); A New Civilization – Williams Naranjo (New York University); Mutt – Chloe Aktas (New York University)	
2016	Foreign Narrative	Gold: Invention of Trust – Alex Schaad (University of Television and Film Munich, Germany); Silver: Where the Woods End – Felix Ahrens (Filmuniversität Babelsberg Konrad Wolf, Germany); Bronze: Tenants – Klara Kochanska (The Polish National Film, Television and Theatre School, Poland)	Beautiful Figure – Hajni Kis (Academy of Drama and Film in Budapest, Hungary); Flowers – Judita Gamulin (Academy of Dramatic Art, University of Zagreb, Croatia); Generation Mars – Alexander Turpin (Norwegian Film School, Norway); Peacock – Ondrej Hudecek (Film & TV School of the Academy of Performing Arts, Prague, Czech Republic)	
2016	Foreign Animation	Gold: Ayny – Ahmad Saleh (Academy of Media Arts Cologne, Germany)	Eye for an Eye – Steve Bache and Mahyar Goudarzi (Film Academy Baden-Württemberg, Germany); I Come From Prairie – Arisbek Nuhan (Beijing Film Academy, China)	
2016	Foreign Documentary	Gold: The Most Beautiful Woman – Maya Sarfaty (Tel Aviv University, Israel)	Tarfala – Johannes Östergård (University of Television and Film Munich, Germany); The Mute's House –Tamar Kay (The Jerusalem Sam Spiegel Film School, Israel)	

==== 44th Annual Student Academy Awards – October 12, 2017 ====
Site: Samuel Goldwyn Theater

Year	Category	Award	Winners	Nominees	Ref.
2017
2017	Domestic Film Schools	Alternative	Gold: Opera of Cruelty – Max R.A. Fedore (New York University)	Last Dance – Zhaoyu Zhou (University of Southern California); Mira – Amanda Tasse (University of Southern California); The Colored Hospital: A Visual Poem – Terrance Daye (Morehouse College)	
2017	Domestic Film Schools	Animation	Gold: In a Heartbeat – Beth David and Esteban Bravo (Ringling College of Art and Design); Silver: Cradle – Devon Manney (University of Southern California); Bronze: E-delivery – Young Gul Cho (School of Visual Arts)	Extinguished – Ashley Anderson and Jacob Mann (Ringling College of Art and Design); Once a Hero – Xia Li (University of Southern California); Pinky Toe – Mathieu Libman (California Institute of the Arts); Winston – Aram Sarkisian (California Institute of the Arts)	
2017	Domestic Film Schools	Documentary	Gold: Hale – Brad Bailey (University of California, Berkeley); Silver: On Pointe – Priscilla Thompson and Joy Jihyun Jeong (Columbia University); Bronze: One Way Home – Qingzi Fan (New York University)	Free The Wall – Darryl Shreve, (Wayne State University); How To Make A Pearl – Jason Hanasik (University of California, Berkeley); Sisterly, – Nina Vallado (Andrews University); The Sandman – Lauren Knapp (Stanford University)	
2017	Domestic Film Schools	Narrative	Gold: My Nephew Emmett – Kevin Wilson, Jr. (New York University); Silver: Mammoth – Ariel Heller (University of Southern California); Bronze: Who's Who in Mycology – Marie Dvorakova (New York University)	A Foreman – Daniel Drummond (Chapman University); Guo Mie – Joseph Chen-Chieh Hsu (New York University); I Live Here – Shane Watson (California College of the Arts); Into The Blue – Antoneta Alamat Kusijanović (Columbia University)	
2017	International Film Schools	Animation	Gold: Life Smartphone – Chenglin Xie (China Central Academy of Fine Arts, China)	Child – Iring Freytag and Viktor Stickel (Filmakademie Baden-Württemberg, Germany); Tough – Jennifer Zheng (Kingston University London, United Kingdom)	
2017	International Film Schools	Documentary	Gold: Galamsey – Johannes Preuss (Filmakademie Baden-Württemberg, Germany)	Aurelia and Pedro – Omar Robles and José Permar (Universidad de Guadalajara, Mexico); Exhibit Human – Arianna Vergari and Valentina Traini (Centro Sperimentale di Cinematografia, Abruzzo, Italy)	
2017	International Film Schools	Narrative	Gold: Watu Wote/All of Us – Katja Benrath, (Hamburg Media School, Germany); Silver: Facing Mecca – Jan-Eric Mack, (Zurich University of the Arts, Switzerland); Bronze: When Grey Is a Colour – Marit Weerheijm (Netherlands Film Academy, Netherlands)	Annunciation – Halit Ruhat Yildiz (Academy of Media Arts, Germany); Blue Summer Symphony – Sinje Köhler (Filmakademie Baden-Württemberg, Germany); Earthly People – Ádám Freund (Academy of Drama and Film in Budapest, Hungary); The French Revolution – Hai Afik (The Maaleh School of Television & Film, Israel)	

==== 45th Annual Student Academy Awards – October 11, 2018 ====
Site: Samuel Goldwyn Theater

Year	Category	Award	Winners	Nominees	Ref.
2018
2018	Domestic Film Schools	Alternative	Gold: Reanimated – Shae Demandt (Florida State University)	Transient Passengers (Experiment Number NÜN) – Natalia Hermida (Chapman University); Emunah – Sang Hyoun Han (School of Visual Arts)	
2018	Domestic Film Schools	Animation	Gold: Raccoon and the Light – Hanna Kim (California Institute of the Arts); Silver: Daisy – Yu Yu (University of Southern California); Bronze: Re-Gifted – Eaza Shukla (Ringling College of Art and Design)	Attack of the Potato Clock – Victoria Lopez and Ji young Na (Ringling College of Art and Design); Little Bandits – Alex Avagimian (California Institute of the Arts); Rebooted – Sagar Arun and Rachel Kral (Ringling College of Art and Design); Reflection – Hannah Park (Ringling College of Art and Design)	
2018	Domestic Film Schools	Documentary	Gold: An Edited Life – Mathieu Faure (New York University); Silver: Love and Loss – Yiying Li (University of Southern California); Bronze: Dust Rising – Lauren Schwartzman (University of California, Berkeley)	1,500 Miles 23 Days – Veronica Wangshen (New York University); Finding Yingying – Jiayan "Jenny" Shi (Northwestern University); Forced – Grace Oyenubi and Nani Sahra Walker (University of California, Berkeley); Mining Phosphorus – Alan Toth (University of California, Berkeley)	
2018	Domestic Film Schools	Narrative	Gold: Spring Flower – Hua Tong (University of Southern California); Silver: Lalo's House – Kelley Kali (University of Southern California); Bronze: Esta Es Tu Cuba/This Is Your Cuba – Brian Robau (Chapman University)	Bini – Erblin Nushi (George Mason University); Empty Skies – Wenting Deng and Luke Fisher (Ohio University); June – Huay-Bing Law (University of Texas at Austin); Masks – Mahaliyah Ayla O (University of Southern California); Mid City Blue – Kristopher D Wilson (University of California – Los Angeles)	
2018	International Film Schools	Animation	Gold: The Green Bird (MoPA, France) – Pierre Perveyrie, Maximilien Bougeous, Marine Goalard, Irina Nguyen-Duc, and Quentin Dubois	A Blink of an Eye – Kiana Naghshineh (Filmakademie Baden-Wurttemberg, Germany); L'Aviatrice – Jacques Leyreloup, Victor Tolila, Perrine Renard, Laura Viver Canal and Gael Chauvet (ESMA, France); Meli-Metro – Alexandre Blain, Lucas Germain, Christophe Gigot, Jade Guilbault, Andreas Muller and Simon Puculek (ESMA, France)	
2018	International Film Schools	Documentary	Gold: Nomadic Doctor – Mart Bira (University of Hertfordshire, United Kingdom)	F32.2 – Annelie Boros (University of Television and Film Munich, Germany); Tracing Addai – Esther Niemeier (Film University Babelsberg Konrad Wolf, Germany)	
2018	International Film Schools	Narrative	Gold: Get Ready With Me – Jonatan Etzler (Stockholm Academy of the Arts, Sweden); Silver: Almost Everything – Lisa Gertsch (Zurich University of the Arts, Switzerland); Bronze: A Siege – Istvan Kovacs (University of Theatre and Film Arts Budapest, Hungary)	Touch Me – Eileen Byrne (Hochschule für Fernsehen und Film München, Germany); August Sun – Franco Volpi (London Film School, United Kingdom); Dead Birds – Johnny Kenton (National Film and Television School, United Kingdom); Sons of No One – Hans Vannetelbosch (LUCA School of Arts, Belgium)	

==== 46th Annual Student Academy Awards – October 17, 2019 ====
Site: Samuel Goldwyn Theater

Year	Category	Award	Winners	Nominees	Ref.
2019
2019	Domestic Film Schools	Alternative	Gold: Patron Saint – Georden West (Emerson College)	Rumours – Nicole Aebersold (Film University Babelsberg KONRAD WOLF); Two Paper Nightingales – Kaylin George (Chapman University)	[14]
2019	Domestic Film Schools	Animation	Gold: Grendell – Kalee McCollaum (BYU Center for Animation); Silver: Game Changer – Aviv Mano (Ringling College of Art and design); Bronze: Two – Emre Okten (University of Southern California)	CRUNCH – Liukaidi Peng (School of the Visual Arts); Misguided – Sanghyun Kim (Ringling College of Art and Design); Push – Trilina Mai (California State University – Long Beach); why z? – Asher Horowitz (School of Visual Arts)	[14]
2019	Domestic Film Schools	Documentary	Gold: Sankofa - Princess Garrett (Villanova University); Silver: Something To Say – Abby Lieberman and Joshua Lucas (Columbia University); Bronze: All That Remains – Eva Rendle (University of California, Berkeley)	Off The Court: The Story of Kezo Brown – Jorden Klein and Aaron Rose (Northwestern University); That Was Ray – Jordan Gorman, Brenten Brandenburg, and Kaustubh Singh (Chapman University); Relentless – Shelby Thompson (Chapman University); Twinkle Dammit! – Chuang Xu (School of Visual Arts)	[14]
2019	Domestic Film Schools	Narrative	Gold: Miller & Son – Asher Jelinsky (American Film Institute); Silver: The Chef - Hao Zheng (American Film Institute); Bronze: Tree #3 – Omer Ben-Shachar (American Film Institute)	Bolero – Sarah Gross (University of Southern California); Balloon – Jeremy Merrifield (American Film Institute); Marriage Material, the Musical! – Oran Zegman (American Film Institute); Under Darkness – Caroline Friend (University of Southern California)	[14]
2019	International Film Schools	Animation	Gold: Daughter - Daria Kashcheeva (Film and TV School of the Academy of Performing Arts in Prague – FAMU)	Love Me, Fear Me – Veronica Solomon (Film University Babelsborg KNORAD WOLF); The Ostrich Politic – Mohamad Houhou (Gobelins, l'ecole de l'image)	[14]
2019	International Film Schools	Documentary	Gold: Family2 – Yifan Sun (The Polish National Film, Television and Theatre School in Lodz)	Oro Blanco – Gisela Carbajal Rodriguez (University of Television and Film Munich); The Winds Heritage – Alejandra Retana, Cesar Camacho, and Cesar Hernandez (University of Guadalajara)	[14]
2019	International Film Schools	Narrative	Gold: Bonobo - Zoel Aeschbacher (ECAL); Silver: Dog Eat Dog - Rikke Gregersen (Westerdals Kristiania University College); Bronze: November 1st – Charlie Manton (National Film and Television School)	Quiet Land Good People – Johannes Bachmann (Zurich University of Arts); The Last Romantic – Natalia Garcia Agraz (Centro de Capacitacion Cinematografica); Senor – Masha Clark (The London Film School); Human – Korwin Quinonez (Incine)	[14]

=== 2020s ===
==== 47th Annual Student Academy Awards – October 21, 2020 ====
Site: Virtual event

Year	Category	Award	Winners	Nominees	Ref.
2020
2020	Domestic Film Schools	Alternative	Gold: Simulacra – Curry Sicong Tian (University of Southern California)	Out Of Ordinary – Luca Signoretti, Tobias Buchmann, Alicja Pahl (Zurich University of the Arts, Switzerland); To The Girl That Looks Like Me – Ewurakua Dawson-Amoah (New York University); Prisoners of the Body – Elisa Maria Nadal (University of Television and Film Munich, Germany)	
2020	Domestic Film Schools	Animation	Gold: Ciervo – Pilar Garcia-Fernandezsesma (Rhode Island School of Design); Silver: Mime Your Manners – Kate Namowicz, Skyler Porras (Ringling College of Art and Design); Bronze: Hamsa – Daniela Dwek, Maya Mendonca, Chrisy Baek (School of Visual Arts)	Tricked – Mengyuan Guo, Naicheng Liu, Suhn Young Chung (Ringling College of Art and Design); Bear With Me – Rodrigo Chapoy (Ringling College of Art and Design); Super Generic – Di Lu (Ringling College of Art and Design); Death and Delilah – Kristoffer Molinari (BYU Center for Animation)	
2020	Domestic Film Schools	Documentary	Gold: Unfinished Lives – Yucong Chen (University of Southern California); Silver: The Dope Years: The Story of Latasha Harlins – Allison A. Waite (University of Southern California); Bronze: Making Waves – Laura Zéphirin (New York University)	Louisiana's Missing Coast – James Robinson (Duke University); Little but Fierce – Sara Barger (Vermont College of Fine Arts); Birds without Wings – Rishabh Thakkar (Chapman University); In Their Fight – Orion Rose Kelly, Pedro Cota (University of California, Berkeley)	
2020	Domestic Film Schools	Narrative	Gold: Umama – Talia Smith (New York University); Silver: Bittu – Karishma Dube (New York University); Bronze: Sweet Potatoes – Rommel Villa Barriga (University of Southern California)	Fragile Moon – Phyllis Tam (New York Film Academy); Our Side – Nicola Rinciari (Savannah College of Art & Design); Headlock – Damon Laguna (University of Southern California); Incognito – Jacky Song (Loyola Marymount University)	
2020	International Film Schools	Animation	Gold: The Beauty – Pascal Schelbli (Filmakademie Baden-Württemberg, Germany)	o28 – Otalia Caussé, Geoffroy Collin, Fabien Meyran (Supinfocom Rubika, France); The Tree – Han Yang & Basil Malek (Gobelins, l'ecole de l'image, France)	
2020	International Film Schools	Documentary	Gold: Dear Father… – Maren Klakegg (Westerdals Institute of Film and Media, Kristiania University College, Norway)	Miss Curvy – Ghada Eldemellawy (National Film and Television School, United Kingdom); Tanda – Teodora-Kosara Popova (National Academy for Theatre and Film Arts, Bulgaria)	
2020	International Film Schools	Narrative	Gold: My Dear Corpses – German Golub (Baltic Film & Media School, Tallinn University, Estonia); Silver: Crescendo – Percival Argüero Mendoza (Centro de Capacitación Cinematográfica, Mexico); Bronze: I Was Still There When You Left Me – Marie McCourt (Institut des Arts de Diffusion, Belgium)	Da Yie – Anthony Nti (School of Arts, Belgium); We Are Dancers – Joe Morris (Northern Film School, United Kingdom); The Stamp – Lovro Mrdjen (Akademija Dramske Umjetnosti, Croatia); Porfotto – Edson da Conceicao (Nederlandse Filmacademie, Netherlands); Papapa – Kerren Lumer-Klabbers (Den Norske Filmskolen, Norway)	

==== 48th Annual Student Academy Awards – October 21, 2021 ====
Site: Virtual event

Year	Category	Award	Winners	Nominees	Ref.
2021
2021	Domestic and International Film Schools	Alternative/ Experimental	Gold: Frozen Out – Hao Zhou (University of Iowa)	Apocalypse Baby, We Advertise the End of the World – Camille Tricaud, Franziska Unger (Hochschule für Fernsehen und Film München (Germany)); Do You Hear Those Crows – Ryen Goebel (Savannah College of Art and Design)	
2021	Domestic Film Schools	Animation	Gold: Unforgotten – Sujin Kim (California Institute of the Arts); Silver: Barking Orders – Alexander Tullo (Ringling College of Art and Design); Bronze: Slumber with Snakes – Teagan Barrone (Cleveland Institute of Art)	The Exortwist – Loren Baskin Almazan, Laura Koval (Ringling College of Art and Design); Final Deathtination – Marika Tamura (Ringling College of Art and Design); RenaiDance – Zhike Yang, Wenjie Wu, Han Chen Chang (School of Visual Arts); Tacet – Zachary Simon (Rhode Island School of Design)	
2021	Domestic Film Schools	Documentary	Gold: When They’re Gone – Kristen Hwang (University of California, Berkeley); Silver: Eagles Rest in Liangshan – Bohao Liu (New York University); Bronze: Not Just a Name – De’Onna Young-Stephens (University of Southern California)	Anshan Diaries – Charles Xiuzhi Dong (New York University); It Takes a Circus – Sarah D. Collins, Zoe Ramushu (Columbia University); The Militiaman – David Peter Hansen (Columbia University); Translucent – Avery Fox, Kayla Hoeflinger (California State University Northridge)	
2021	Domestic Film Schools	Narrative	Gold: When the Sun Sets – Phumi Morare (Chapman University); Silver: Close Ties to Home Country – Akanksha Cruczynski (Columbia College Chicago); Bronze: No Law, No Heaven – Kristi Hoi (University of California, Los Angeles)	Le Prince Oublié – Chloe Aguirre (Chapman University); Lucia – Victoria Rivera (Columbia University); The Monkey King – Yingqi (Niko) Ren (American Film Institute); Summer Ends – Hailong Niu (University of California, Los Angeles)	
2021	International Film Schools	Animation	Gold: Louis' Shoes – Théo Jamin, Kayu Leung and Marion Philippe (MoPA (France))	Migrants – Antoine Dupriez, Aubin Kubiak, Zoé Devise (Pôle 3D (France)); A Tiny Tale – Sylvain Cuvillier, Maÿlis Mosny, Zijing Ye (Rubika (France))	
2021	International Film Schools	Documentary	Gold: Why Didn’t You Stay for Me? – Milou Gevers (Nederlandse Filmacademie (The Netherlands))	Haeberli – Moritz Mueller-Preisser (Hochschule für Fernsehen und Film München (Germany)); Pepedrilo – Victor Cartas Valdivia (Universidad de Guadalajara (Mexico))	
2021	International Film Schools	Narrative	Gold: Tala’vision – Murad Abu Eisheh (Filmakademie Baden-Württemberg (Germany)); Silver: Adisa – Simon Denda (Hochschule für Fernsehen und Film München (Germany)); Bronze: Bad Omen – Salar Pashtoonyar (York University (Canada))	Carrier – Max Ovaska (Aalto University (Finland)); Day X – Katharina Rivilis (Deutsche Film – und Fernsehakademie Berlin (Germany)); First Last Summer – Nastazja Gonera (Państwowa Wyższa Szkola Filmowa, Telewizyjna i Teatralna (Poland)); I Am – Jerry Hoffmann (Hamburg Media School (Germany))	

==== 49th Annual Student Academy Awards – October 20, 2022 ====
Site: David Geffen Theater

Year	Category	Award	Winners	Nominees	Ref.
2022
2022	Domestic and International Film Schools	Alternative/ Experimental	Gold: Against Reality, Olivia Peace (University of Southern California)	Ask Again Later, Chloe Evangelista (Pratt Institute); It Will Rain Today, Mariana Correa González ((Universidad de Antioquia (Colombia)	
2022	Domestic and International Film Schools	Animation	Gold: An Ostrich Told Me the World Is Fake and I Think I Believe It, Lachlan Pendragon (Griffith Film School (Australia)); Silver: Laika & Nemo, Jan Gadermann and Sebastian Gadow (Konrad Wolf Film University of Babelsberg (Germany)); Bronze: The Seine’s Tears, Yanis Belaid, Eliott Benard and Nicolas Mayeur (Pôle 3D Digital & Creative School (France))	The Boot, Seyed Mohsen Pourmohseni Shakib (Payame Noor University (Iran)); Goodbye Jérôme!, Adam Sillard, Gabrielle Selnet, Chloé Farr (Gobelins, School of Images (France)); Little Thing, Clara Mesplé, Chloé Viala, Camille Burles (École Georges Méliès (France)); Period Drama, Anushka Nair, Lauryn Anthony (Ringling College of Art and Design (United States))	
2022	Domestic and International Film Schools	Documentary	Gold: Found, Shuhao Tse (New York University); Silver: “Here to Stay,” Jared Peraglia, (New York University); Bronze: Seasons, Gabriella Canal and Michael Fearon (Columbia University)	The State of Dissent, Roshaan Khattak (University of the Arts London (United Kingdom)); Traded, Simran Arora, Harshit Bawa (University of Greenwich (United Kingdom)); Waves Apart, Josh Greene (University of Southern California (United States)); What Nobody Talks About, Hansine Killingmoe Såstad (Kristiania University College (Norway))	
2022	Domestic and International Film Schools	Narrative	Gold: Almost Home, Nils Keller (University of Television and Film Munich (Germany)); Silver: Rooms, Welf Reinhart (University of Television and Film Munich (Germany)); Bronze: Shedding Angels, Freddy Macdonald (American Film Institute)	L’Avversario, Federico Russotto (Centro Sperimentale di Cinematografia (Italy)); Living All of Life, Marlén Ríos-Farjat (Centro de Capacitación Cinematográfica (Mexico)); Songs of a Caretaker, Pascal Schuh (Konrad Wolf Film University of Babelsberg (Germany)); The Boy Who Couldn’t Feel Pain, Eugen Merher (Film Academy Baden-Württemberg (Germany))	

==== 50th Annual Student Academy Awards – October 24, 2023 ====
Site: Samuel Goldwyn Theater

Year	Category	Award	Winners	Nominees	Ref.
2023
2023	Domestic and International Film Schools	Alternative/ Experimental	Gold: Skin – Leo Behrens (American Film Institute)	Ardent Other – Alice Brygo (Le Fresnoy, France); The Posthuman Hospita – Junha Kim (California Institute of the Arts)	
2023	Domestic and International Film Schools	Animation	Gold: Boom – Gabriel Augerai, Romain Augier & Yannick Jacquin (École des Nouvelles Images, France); Silver: Diplomatie de l’Éclipse – César Luton, Achille Pasquier & Clémence Bailly (MoPA 3D Animation School, France); Bronze: “Mum’s Spaghetti” – Lisa Kenney (National Film and Television School, United Kingdom)	Friendly Fire – Tom Koryto Blumen (Bezalel Academy of Arts and Design Jerusalem, Israel); The Little Poet – Justine King (California Institute of the Arts); Samara Op.4 – Maxime Wattrelos, Jérémy Trochet & Marie Heribel (Pôle 3D Digital & Creative School, France); The Sun Is Bad – Rachel Mow (Savannah College of Art & Design); Tear Off – Clément Del Negro, Camille Souchard & Matthias Bourgeuil (Rubika, France)	
2023	Domestic and International Film Schools	Documentary	Gold: Wings of Dust – Giorgio Ghiotto (New York University); Silver: “Duet” – Lyuwei Chen (New York University); Bronze: Hasta Encontrarlos (Till We Find Them) – Jean Chapiro (Columbia University)	#2276 – Sara Sims & Samuel Barnett (California State University, Northridge); God Bless the Family – MJ Johnson (University of California, Berkeley); Khayelitsha (Our New Home) – Pieter Genee (National Film and Television School, United Kingdom); Rising Above – Natálie Durchánková (Filmová a Televizní Fakulta Akademie Múzických Umění v Praze, Czech Republic)	
2023	Domestic and International Film Schools	Narrative	Gold: Invisible Border – Mark Gerstorfer (Filmakademie Wien, Austria); Silver: Revisted – Iain Aigin Stronach Forbes (Den Norske Filmskolen, Norway); Bronze: Istina (Truth) – Tamara Denić (Hamburg Media School, Germany)	Children of Light – Minkyu Kang (Columbia University); It Will Rain – Amir Zaza (Nederlandse Filmacademie, Netherlands); On the Edge – María Claudia Blanco (La Fémis, France); Stateless – Tawfik Sabouni (Institut National Supérieur des Arts du Spectacle et Techniques de Diffusion, Belgium); Those Who Follow – Frederic Kau (Hamburg Media School, Germany)	

==== 51st Annual Student Academy Awards – October 14, 2024 ====
Site: Odeon Luxe Leicester Square, London

Year	Category	Award	Winners	Nominees	Ref.
2024
2024	Domestic and International Film Schools	Alternative/ Experimental	Gold: A Brighter Summer Day for the Lady Avengers – Birdy Wei-Ting Hung (San Francisco State University); Silver: In Living Memory – Dori Walker (Brown University); Bronze: bonVoyage pour monVoyage – Akshit Kumar (National Institute of Design, India)	Crescendo – María Agostina Menna Galetto (Universidad Abierta Interamericana, Argentina); Illusion of Ego – Mingyu Tian (Central Academy of Fine Arts, China); Lullaby for the Lost – Tom Potter (Bournemouth Film School, United Kingdom); Wired – Daniel Salas (Chapman University)	
2024	Domestic and International Film Schools	Animation	Gold: Au Revoir Mon Monde – Florian Maurice, Maxime Foltzer & Estelle Bonnardel (MoPA 3D Animation School, France); Silver: Origami – Kei Kanamori (Digital Hollywood University, Japan); Bronze: Student Accomplice – Spencer Baird (Brigham Young University)	Après Papi – Juliette Michel, Swann Valenza & Axel Sence (MoPA 3D Animation School, France); Coquille – Loic Girault, Grégoire Callies & Anna Danton (École Supérieure des Métiers Artistiques, France); Dragfox – Lisa Ott (National Film and Television School, United Kingdom); El Ombligo de la Luna – Julia Grupińska, Tian Westraad & Ezequiel Garibay (Gobelins, France)	
2024	Domestic and International Film Schools	Documentary	Gold: Keeper – Hannah Rafkin, (School of Visual Arts); Silver: The 17% – Aaron Johnson, (Chapman University); Bronze: A Dream Called Khushi (Happiness) – Rishabh Raj Jain, (New York University)	Burnt Country – Kirsten Slemint (National Film and Television School, United Kingdom); Jerhy – John Ortiz (University of California, Santa Cruz); Mail Order Queens – Luke Purdye (National Film and Television School, United Kingdom); The Undertakers – Zac Lazarou (National Film and Television School, United Kingdom)	
2024	Domestic and International Film Schools	Narrative	Gold: The Compatriot – Pavel Sýkora & Viktor Horák, (Filmová Akademie Miroslava Ondříčka v Písku, Czech Republic); Silver: Crust – Jens Kevin Georg, (Film University Babelsberg KONRAD WOLF, Germany); Bronze: Neither Donkey nor Horse – Robin Wang, (University of Southern California)	FÖA – Margherita Ferrari (Centro Sperimentale di Cinematografia, Italy); The Lights Above – Luke J. Salewski (University of Southern California); Take Me to Her – Bartłomiej Błaszczyński (Krzysztof Kieślowski Film School, University of Silesia, Poland); Trouble – Sarah Blok (National Film and Television School, United Kingdom)	

==== 52nd Annual Student Academy Awards – October 6, 2025 ====
Site: Ziegfeld Ballroom, New York

Year	Category	Award	Winners	Nominees	Ref.
2025
2025	Domestic and International Film Schools	Alternative/ Experimental	Gold: The Song of Drifters – Xindi Zhang (University of Southern California); Silver: Without Perfection – Vega Moltke-Leth, (University of Copenhagen, Denmark); Bronze: flower_gan – Mati Granica (London College of Communication, United Kingdom)	No Home Movies – Amaïllia Bordet (La Fémis, France); Photo Play XX – Zolomon Zelko (Universidad Abierta Interamericana, Argentina); Synergy – Emilie Bouet Conran & Honor West (Arts University Bournemouth, United Kingdom); the weight of the moon – Felizitas Hoffmann (University of Television and Film Munich, Germany)	
2025	Domestic and International Film Schools	Animation	Gold: A Sparrow’s Song – Tobias Eckerlin (Film Academy Baden-Württemberg, Germany); Silver: The 12 Inch Pianist – Lucas Ansel (Rhode Island School of Design); Bronze: The Shyness of Trees – Sofiia Chuikovska, Loïck du Plessis D’Argentré & Maud Le Bras (Gobelins, France)	Beautify – Elizaveta Makarenko (Ringling College of Art & Design); The Song of the Sheep – Jules Marcel, Juliette Bigo & Anaïs Ledoux (RUBIKA, France); The Undying Pain of Existence – Oscar Jacobson (Film Academy Baden-Württemberg, Germany); Wolfie – Philippe Kastner (Film and TV School of Academy of Performing Arts in Prague, Czech Republic)	
2025	Domestic and International Film Schools	Documentary	Gold: Tides of Life – Tatiana McCabe University of the West of England Bristol, United Kingdom); Silver: Confession – Rebeka Bizubová (Academy of Performing Arts in Bratislava, Slovakia); Bronze: I Remember – Jane Deng (New York University)	Accused Number 41 – Maryam Haddadi (Edinburgh College of Art, United Kingdom); Against a Sharp White Background – Asahni Williams (University of North Carolina School of the Arts); Alon, My Brother the Hero – Omri Koren (Sam Spiegel Film and Television School, Israel); We All Live Downwind – Sascha Melamed (Chapman University)	
2025	Domestic and International Film Schools	Narrative	Gold: Dad’s Not Home – Jan Saczek (Krzysztof Kieślowski Film School, Poland); Silver: Butcher’s Stain – Meyer Levinson-Blount (Tel Aviv University, Israel); Bronze: Kubrick, Like I Love You – Zefan Wang (Columbia University)	Bare Feet – Vincent Mocco (New York University); Dandelion – Fiona Obertinca (American Film Institute); Death Lives – Lukáš Vacula (Private Higher Vocational Film School in Písek, Czech Republic); Vasu – Sidharth Harikumar (MetFilm School Berlin, Germany)	

==== 53rd Annual Student Academy Awards – September 14, 2026 ====
Site: TIFF Lightbox, Toronto

Year	Category	Award	Winners	Nominees	Ref.
2026
2026	Domestic and International Film Schools	Alternative/ Experimental	Gold: Drifting - Lei He (Duke University); Silver: Volklore - Viktorie Štěpánová (Filmová a Televizní Fakulta Akademie Múzických Umění v Praze, Czech Republic); Bronze: Where Is My Sex Drive? - Nina Broers (St. Joost School of Art & Design, Netherlands)	Everyone Always Experience Everything Equally - Sinned Raun (VIA Film and Transmedia, Denmark); Inlands - Zsófia Pethő (University of Art and Design, Hungary); Neither Reality, Nor Fiction - Sara Khani (Pars University of Architecture and Art, Iran); A subconscious dive - Raghad Albakheet (Jordan Cinema Academy, Jordan)	
2026	Domestic and International Film Schools	Animation	Gold: COWS - Jonathan Lally, Elio Molinaro & Nicolas Acevedo Ferrate (École Supérieure de Métiers Artistiques, France); Silver: The Panic Inside - Matthias Strasser (Film Academy Baden-Württemberg, Germany); Bronze: Gauze - Noran Fikri Alezabi, Xinyue Ma & Yulin Yue (Gobelins, France)	Fellow - Martha Rivière, Théo Bergougnoux & Romane Casha (RUBIKA, France); Le Jardin Rossini - William Burger, Odelia Laine & Mathilde Vergereau (Gobelins, France); Send nudes - David Sick (Film Academy Baden-Württemberg, Germany); Tears of the Mountain - Yehor Bondarenko, Alp Kurdoglu & Ange Yajima (Gobelins, France)	
2026	Domestic and International Film Schools	Documentary	Gold: The Last People of Petra - Lara Dihmis (New York University); Silver: I Want to Live - Jason Elliott (National Film and Television School, United Kingdom); Bronze: Artificial Love - Arjun Fischer (University of Southern California)	Body to Heart - Jenny Barruol (National Film and Television School, United Kingdom); Escape - Anna Danielle Moore (University of the West of England Bristol, United Kingdom); Seeds We Bury - Olivia Hansen & Soledad Robins (Villanova University); Voices in the Mirror - Michael Blackshire (Ohio University)	
2026	Domestic and International Film Schools	Narrative	Gold: The Dragon Letter - Stanzin Jigmet (Escola Superior de Cinema i Audiovisuals de Catalunya, Spain); Silver: The Pichenotte - Antoine Boulanger (Concordia University, Canada); Bronze: Kamathipura Express - Leon Korzyński (Warsaw Film School, Poland)	Every Time I See a Cock I Go Funny - Lyndon Henley Hanrahan (National Film and Television School, United Kingdom); Kanaan - Dominik Mirecki (Warsaw Film School, Poland); Please, praise me - Zhu Jianhua (Beijing Film Academy, China); Stem - Daeil Kim (University of Southern California)	

== See also ==
- List of film awards
