= Lachlan Pendragon =

Filmmaker

- Occupation: Animator
- Years active: 2015-present
- Notable work: An Ostrich Told Me the World Is Fake and I Think I Believe It

Lachlan Pendragon (born ca. 1996) is a Brisbane-based Australian animator, best known for stop-motion animated film An Ostrich Told Me the World Is Fake and I Think I Believe It.

== Career ==
In 2021, Pendragon wrote and directed the stop-motion animated short film An Ostrich Told Me the World Is Fake and I Think I Believe It. In an interview with "Novastream Network," he mentioned that it took ten months to develop the film, which he did as a research project for his doctorate program at Griffith Film School. The film received several nominations including Berlin International Film Festival, Annecy International Animation Film Festival, and others. It was honored at the Student Academy Awards in 2022. It was nominated for the Best Animated Short Academy Award in 2023.

== Filmography ==
- 2015 - Bush Turkeys of QCA
- 2015 - Elevator Madness
- 2017 - The Toll
- 2019 - Beethoven: live at Roma Street Parkland
- 2021 - An Ostrich Told Me the World Is Fake and I Think I Believe It
