= Lauren Lazin =

American filmmaker

Lauren Lazin is an American filmmaker whose documentaries have been nominated for the Emmys multiple times. She directed and produced the 2003 Oscar-nominated documentary film Tupac: Resurrection.

== Career ==
=== Film work ===
Lazin's first feature film, Tupac: Resurrection, was nominated for a 2005 Academy Award. Her follow-up film, I'm Still Here: Real Diaries of Young People Who Lived During the Holocaust, was nominated for two 2006 Emmy Awards, and was named Best Documentary by the National Foundation for Jewish Culture. She was also the director of the documentary The Last Days of Left Eye which looked at the life and death of Lisa "Left Eye" Lopes of TLC.

Lazin was also an executive producer for The U.S. vs. John Lennon, which was distributed theatrically by Lionsgate Entertainment, and for Jihad for Love (a feature film about Gay Muslims) which premiered at the 2007 Toronto Film Festival and the 2008 Berlin Film Festival. It went on to win a GLAAD award for Outstanding Documentary.

Her film Soul Train: The Hippest Trip in America was nominated for an EMMY in 2012, and was awarded the Cine Golden Eagle. It premiered as VH1's highest-rated rock documentary. Lazin's Last Days of Left Eye was the opening-night movie for the 2007 Urban World and Atlanta Film festivals. It premiered on VH1 in the spring of 2007 to critical acclaim and stellar ratings. Other film work for VH1 include the highly rated specials The TRL Decade and Yo! The Story of Yo! MTV Raps.

Lazin also directed the concert sequences for the film Can't Stand Losing You, a feature documentary about the rock band The Police, told from the point of view of its celebrated guitarist, Andy Summers. In 2014 she directed a documentary feature for Showtime, L Word Mississippi: Hate the Sin, which received critical praise and won the 2015 GLAAD award for Outstanding Documentary.

Made while she was at Stanford University, Lazin's first film The Flapper Story (1985), a look back at the 1920s phenomenon known as "the Flapper" featuring interviews with the surviving women reflecting on their youthful lives and archival footage of that era, premiered at the Museum of Modern Art's New Directors/New Films series and won a Student Academy Award. Her documentary Journey of Dr. Dre was nominated for two 2001 EMMY Awards.

Lazin most recently directed and executive produced the critically acclaimed three-part series Sometimes When We Touch: The Reign, Ruin and Resurrection of Soft Rock which premiered on Paramount Plus in 2023. She is currently developing a feature documentary film about the beloved all-female band The Bangles.

=== Showrunner ===
Lazin co-created, directed and executive produced Newlyweds: The First Year, a docu-reality series for Bravo. The high-profile series debuted May 6, 2013 to excellent ratings and reviews, and was green-lit for a second and third season.

She then went on to co-create, showrun and executive produce Bravo's Extreme Guide to Parenting, which premiered in 2014. Lazin returned to Bravo/E!/Peacock in 2020 with the critically acclaimed For Real: The Story of Reality TV hosted by Andy Cohen, featuring appearances by the Kardashians, the Osbornes, Richard Hatch, Julie Chen, Bret Michaels, Carson Kressley, several " Real Housewives', and dozens more reality TV icons.'

In 2012 Lazin was director and showrunner for Sperm Donor: 74 Kids and Counting, a special for The Style Network, which was nominated for a 2012 EMMY, and later was executive producer for Neighbors With Benefits, a docu-series which premiered on A&E in 2015 and debuted to much buzz and press attention.

Most recently Lazin was showrunner on the 4-part series Biography: Bobby Brown which premiered on A&E in 2022. The series featured exclusive interviews with Bobby and Alicia Brown, Usher, Jermaine Dupri, Babyface, Keith Sweat and members of New Edition.

=== Executive Positions and executive producing work ===
In her capacity as Vice President, Original Production and Programming for WE tv/ AMC Networks Lazin executive produced multiple non-fiction series, most notably Mama June: From Hot to Not, which broke records as the most highly rated series on the network ever, and was the number one new reality series of 2017, with 27 million unique viewers. Her follow up series, Hustle and Soul was a breakout hit as well and is currently airing on Hulu. In 2019 Lazin executive produced Untold Stories of Hip-Hop, hosted by Angie Martinez featuring Cardi B, Snoop Dogg, Queen Latifah, Ice-T, Fat Joe, ASAP Rocky, Ja Rule and DJ Khalid. In 2022 she executive produced the four part true crime series, Hip Hop Mysteries: The Death of Eazy-E.''

Previously Lazin was Senior Vice President of MTV News and Documentaries where she directed, produced, wrote and edited over forty documentaries, as well as oversaw the production of hundreds of hours of non-fiction TV. In 1990, she created Sex in the 90's, now a cult favorite among young audiences. In 1992, when she formed the MTV News and Specials department, she directed and executive produced the documentary series MTV Rockumentary (including bio-pics on The Who, Robbie Robertson, The B-52's, Janet Jackson and many others), MTV Cribs, Diary, My Super Sweet 16, as well as award-winning MTV News specials on topics ranging from drug abuse and racism to religious intolerance and sexual health. Lazin also executive produced the Choose or Lose election special Where Were You at 22?, which went on to be nominated for a Daytime Emmy.

Lazin created the long running True Life, "a critically acclaimed documentary series about social issues affecting young people." She won a 2006 Environmental Media Award for her special Break the Addiction. In 2001 the network's anti-violence campaign Fight For Your Rights received the Television Academy's Governors Award.

In 2009 Lazin directed and executive produced Get Schooled: You Have The Right, which aired on over 40 television networks. The special featured LeBron James, Kelly Clarkson, and President Barack Obama. Her President Obama's Race to the Top Commencement Challenge special was produced in cooperation with the White House and received a 2012 EMMY nomination.

Lazin also executive produced documentary series and specials for a variety of Viacom Networks (now Paramount Global) outside of MTV. Her series Transgeneration (a co-production of Logo and The Sundance Channel) was awarded Best Documentary at the 2006 GLAAD Awards. Her VH1 documentary series Rags to Riches profiled Snoop Dogg, Macy Gray, Akon and Nick Cannon, and was nominated for a 2007 NAMIC Award.

She executive produced the annual Teen Nick HALO Awards (co-created and hosted by Nick Cannon). The show featured Justin Timberlake, LeBron James, Alicia Keys, Lady Gaga, Justin Bieber, Tyra Banks, David Beckham, and Hayden Panettiere (among others) and has won several awards including Best Youth Program at the 2010 and 2011 Banff World Television Awards, and a 2012 NAACP Award.

Other series of note include the hit series Dissed for MTV Mobile, Born Country for CMT, and Coming Out Stories for Logo (2007 IDA Award nominee).

Outside of MTV, Lazin has directed films for the National Organization for Women, induction pieces for the Rock and Roll Hall of Fame Museum (for the Supremes and the Rolling Stones), and an award-winning documentary, Seven Deadly Sins, which was featured on PBS's experimental television series, Alive From Off Center.

=== Branded content ===
Lazin directed and executive produced the high-profile series Rising Icons (for BET and Grey Goose), This Movie is Me (for MTV and various movie studios), the special Where Does Happiness Live? (for Coca-Cola), Imagination Unleashed: An Artisan's Journey (for Ovation and Bombay Sapphire) and Teenage Mutant Ninja Turtles: Behind the Action for Paramount Films and Nickelodeon.

=== Additional awards and honors ===
Lazin's films have won Ace Awards, Monitor Awards, and Cine Golden Eagles, with honors for Best Directing and Best Editing. The National Association of Minorities in Communications, The NAACP, and the National Council on Crime and Delinquency have honored her work. She also received the Ryan White Youth Service Award and the Ribbon of Hope Award for her outstanding contributions to the fight against Teen HIV/ AIDS. In 1995, Fight Back, her film about child sexual abuse, was featured in a special screening for Congress.

She is prominently featured in the reference books The Art of Documentary Film (2005), The Documentary Filmmakers Handbook (2006) and Tupac Remembered (2008), and has taught film classes at Stanford and Duke Universities. She recently was the focus of a two-day film festival retrospective at Ithaca College honoring her work.

Lazin graduated magna cum laude, Phi Beta Kappa, from Smith College in 1982 and received a master's degree in documentary film production from Stanford University in 1985. She has also received an honorary doctorate from Smith College. In 1996 the Women's College Coalition named Lazin as a “Role Model” and featured her in their national Ad Council campaign promoting women's education.

== Filmography ==
- The Flapper Story (1985)
- Journey of Dr. Dre (2000)
- Tupac: Resurrection (2003)
- I'm Still Here: Real Diaries of Young People Who Lived During the Holocaust (2005)
- The Last Days of Left Eye (2007)
- One Train Later (2009)
- Soul Train: The Hippest Trip in America (2010)
- Summit on the Summit (2010)
- Get Schooled: White House Race to the Top Commencement Challenge (2010)
- The 2010 TeenNick HALO Awards (2010)
- President Obama's Race to the Top Commencement Challenge (2011)
- Style Exposed: Sperm Donor - 74 Kids and More (2011)
- The 2011 TeenNick HALO Awards (2011)
- Vh1 Rock Docs: The TRL Decade (2012)
- Vh1 Rock Docs: Yo! The Story of Yo! MTV Raps (2012)
- Imagination Unleashed: An Artisan's Journey (2013)
- Newlyweds: The First Year (series) (2013)
- Extreme Guide to Parenting (series) (2014)
- L Word Mississippi: Hate the Sin (2014)
- Newlyweds The First Year: Where Are They Now? (2015)
- Neighbors With Benefits (series) (2015)

== Accolades ==
- 1985:Student Academy Award for The Flapper Story
- 2012 NAACP Image Award for Outstanding Children's Program for The 2012 Teen Nick HALO Awards
- 2011 BANFF World Television Festival Award for Best Youth Program – Non Fiction for The 2011 Teen Nick HALO Awards
- 2010 BANFF World Television Festival Award for Best Youth Program – Non Fiction for The 2010 Teen Nick HALO Awards

== Nominations ==
- 2011 Daytime Emmy Award for Outstanding Special Class Special, President Obama's 2011 Race to the Top Commencement Challenge
- 2011 Daytime Emmy Award for Outstanding Arts & Culture Programming, Style Exposed: Sperm Donor - 74 Kids and More
- 2011 News & Docs Emmy Award for Outstanding Special Class Special, Soul Train: The Hippest Trip in America
- 2005 Academy Award for Best Documentary, Features for Tupac: Resurrection (shared nomination with Karolyn Ali)
- 2000 Daytime Emmy Award for Outstanding Special Class Special, MTV Uncensored
- 2001 Daytime Emmy Award for Outstanding Special Class Special, 2000 MTV Movie Awards
- 2003 IDA Award for Feature Documentaries, Tupac: Resurrection
- 1999 News & Documentary Emmy Award for Outstanding Coverage of a Breaking News Story – Programs, "True Life"

== See also ==
- List of female film and television directors
- List of LGBT-related films directed by women
