= Ilene Chaiken =

American television director, producer and writer (born 1957)

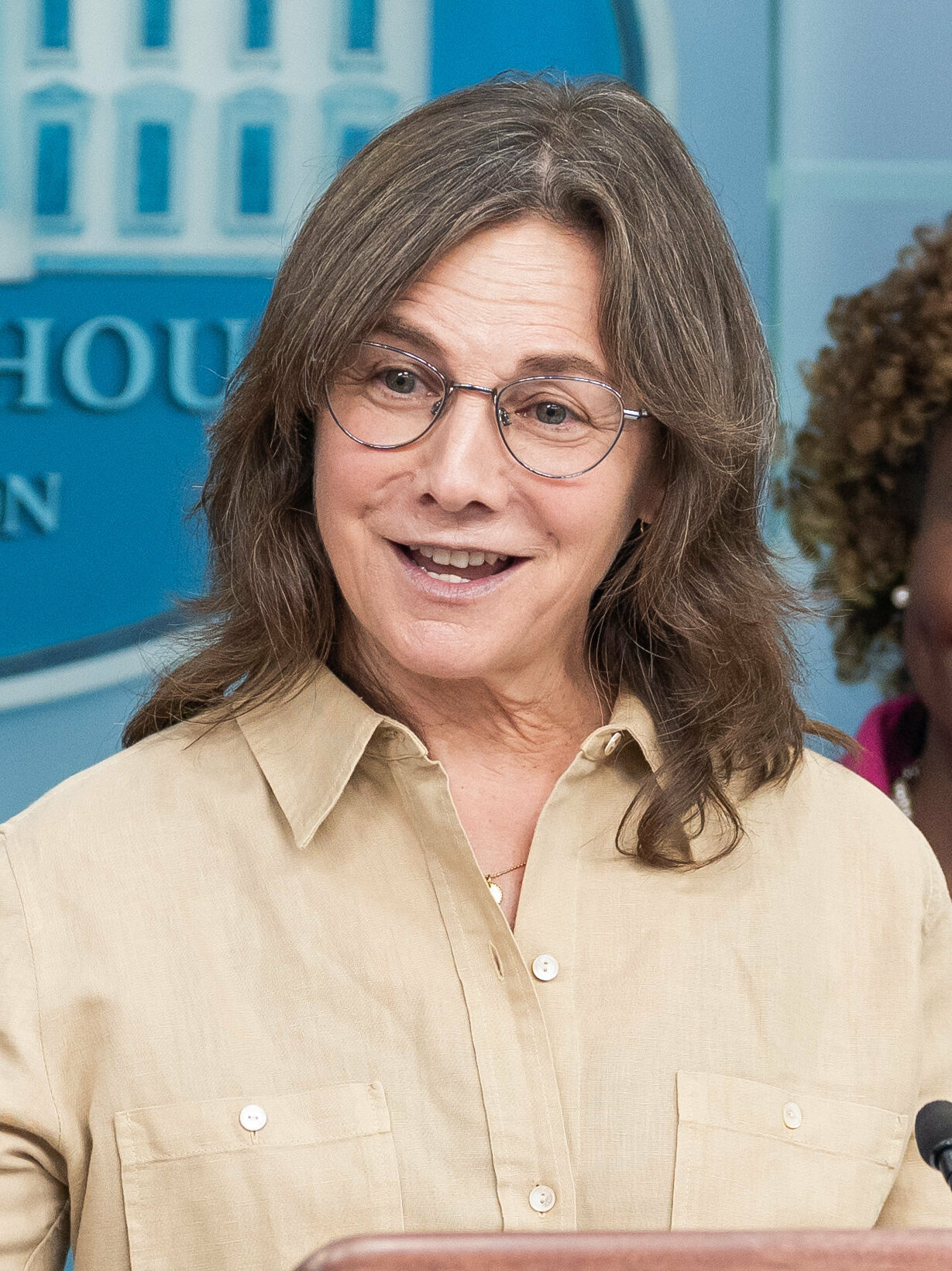
- Chaiken in 2023
- Born: June 30, 1957 (age 69); Elkins Park, Pennsylvania, U.S.
- Occupations: Television director, producer and screenwriter
- Years active: 1988–present
- Known for: The L Word
- Spouse: LouAnne Brickhouse (m. 2013)
- Children: 2

Ilene Chaiken (born June 30, 1957) is an American television producer, director, writer, and founder of Little Chicken Productions. Chaiken was co-creator, writer and executive producer on the television series The L Word and an executive producer on Empire, The Handmaid's Tale, and Law & Order: Organized Crime.

== Early life and education ==
Chaiken was born in Elkins Park, Pennsylvania, on June 30, 1957, to a Jewish family. She studied at the Rhode Island School of Design and graduated with an undergraduate degree in graphic design in 1979.

== Career ==
She began her career as an agent trainee for Creative Artists Agency and as an executive for Aaron Spelling and Quincy Jones Entertainment. In 1988, she was the coordinating producer for The Fresh Prince of Bel-Air and the associate producer for Satisfaction. She then wrote the screenplay Barb Wire (1996), and the television films Dirty Pictures (2000), and Damaged Care (2002). Dirty Pictures won the Golden Globe for Best Miniseries or Television Film in 2000.

Chaiken co-created The L Word in 2004, inspired largely by her own experiences as a lesbian. Her first romance with another woman, which ended in heartbreak when the woman revealed she had a long-distance girlfriend, served as a loose inspiration for the relationship of the characters Marina Ferrer and Jenny Schecter.

In 2007, she and a group of women in the entertainment and tech industries launched a social networking site called OurChart for lesbians and their friends. OurChart was online until 2008 when it was shut down. At that time, a spin-off show of The L Word entitled The Farm was in development and two pilots were being written by Chaiken, although Showtime never bought the series.

Chaiken produced a documentary for Showtime in 2014 titled L Word Mississippi: Hate the Sin. The film focused on multiple lesbian women, telling their experiences of being gay in the Deep South. During this time, Chaiken was also a showrunner on ABC's The Black Box, which was cancelled after one season.

Chaiken is credited with first developing the TV adaptation of The Handmaid's Tale, which became a successful Hulu original show. Chaiken left the project during development to become the show-runner on Fox's Empire, but was still credited as an executive producer.

In January 2019, Showtime announced that it had ordered a full season of the sequel to The L Word. The show aired December 8, 2019, titled The L Word: Generation Q, and picks up where the original series ended, set ten years later.

More recently, her company, Little Chicken Productions, signed an overall deal with Universal Television. In 2020, Chaiken co-created the show Law & Order: Organized Crime, a spin-off of the long-running series Law & Order. The following year, she worked as a writer and showrunner for the series but was replaced by Barry O'Brien part-way through production of the second season.

== Personal life ==
Chaiken has been married to LouAnne Brickhouse, a former executive at Disney, since 2013. They live in the Laurel Canyon area of the Hollywood Hills in Los Angeles and have nurtured more than 100 species of birds and other fauna, which they document regularly on an Instagram account.

Chaiken is co-parent to twin daughters Tallulah and Augusta with her former partner, English architect Miggi Hood.

== Filmography ==
=== Film ===
Associate producer

- Satisfaction (1988)

Writer

- Barb Wire (1996)

=== Television ===
| Year | Title | Writer | Producer | Creator | Notes |
|---|---|---|---|---|---|
| 1991–1992 | The Fresh Prince of Bel-Air | No | Yes | No | |
| 2000 | Dirty Pictures | Yes | No | No | TV movie |
| 2002 | Damaged Care | Yes | No | No | TV movie |
| 2004–2009 | The L Word | Yes | Yes | Yes | |
| 2010–2012 | The Real L Word | No | Yes | Yes | |
| 2014 | L Word Mississippi: Hate the Sin | No | Yes | No | Documentary film |
| 2015–2020 | Empire | No | Executive | No | |
| 2017–2025 | The Handmaid's Tale | No | Executive | No | |
| 2019–2023 | The L Word: Generation Q | No | Executive | Yes | |
| 2021–2022 | Law & Order: Organized Crime | Yes | Executive | Yes | |

== Awards ==
| Year | Award | Category | Nominated work | Result |
|---|---|---|---|---|
| 1997 | 17th Golden Raspberry Awards | Worst Screenplay | Barb Wire | Nominated |
| 2000 | 58th Golden Globe Awards | Best Miniseries or Television Film | Dirty Pictures | Won |
| 2008 | 20th GLAAD Media Awards | Davidson/Valentini Award | The L Word | Won |
| 2016 | 73rd Golden Globe Awards | Best Television Series- Drama | Empire | Nominated |
| 2017 | 69th Primetime Emmy Awards | Outstanding Drama Series | The Handmaid's Tale | Won |
| 2017 | PGA Awards 2017 | Outstanding Producer of Episodic Television, Drama | The Handmaid's Tale | Won |
| 2017 | Writers Guild of America Awards 2017 | Drama Series | The Handmaid's Tale | Won |
| 2017 | Writers Guild of America Awards 2017 | New Series | The Handmaid's Tale | Won |
| 2018 | 70th Primetime Emmy Awards | Outstanding Drama Series | The Handmaid's Tale | Nominated |
| 2018 | PGA Awards 2018 | Outstanding Producer of Episodic Television, Drama | The Handmaid's Tale | Nominated |
| 2018 | Writers Guild of America Awards 2018 | Drama Series | The Handmaid's Tale | Nominated |

== See also ==
- List of female film and television directors
- List of lesbian filmmakers
- List of LGBT-related films directed by women
