= Nocturne in Black =

2016 short film

- Poster
- Directed by: Jimmy Keyrouz
- Written by: Jimmy Keyrouz
- Produced by: Marc Fadel; Ellie Foumbi; Felecia Hunter; Jimmy Keyrouz
- Starring: Karim Zein; Tarek Yaacoub; Julian Farhat
- Cinematography: Ziad Chahoud
- Edited by: Jimmy Keyrouz
- Music by: Fatrin Krajka
- Distributed by: MAD Solutions
- Release date: 2016
- Running time: 23 minutes
- Country: Lebanon
- Language: Arabic

Nocturne in Black is a 2016 short film written and directed by Jimmy Keyrouz. The film premiered at Telluride Film Festival and won the gold medal at the Student Academy Awards, the Bafta Student Film Awards, the Directors Guild of America Student Film Awards. The BBC has described it as an "immaculately shot, high-energy short drama".

== Plot ==
In a war-ravaged Middle Eastern neighborhood, where daily activities such as smoking tobacco, modern dressing, and music have been banned, Karim, a musician, struggles to rebuild his piano after it is destroyed by Jihadists.

== Awards ==
- Student Academy Awards Gold Medal Winner (2017)
- DGA Student Film Awards (2017)
- Oscars Shortlist For Live Action Shorts (2017)
- Telluride Film Festival Student Prints (2017)
- CUFF Faculty Selects (2017)
- NBR Marion Carter Green Award Winner (2017)
- IFP Independent Filmmaker Project Audience Award
- NBR Student Grant Winner (2017)
