= Bird in a Cage =

1986 film by Antonio Zarro

- Directed by: Antonio Zarro
- Written by: Antonio Zarro
- Produced by: Bradford Carr; Truman Anquoe Jr.
- Production company: CBN University
- Distributed by: Zarro Entertainment
- Release date: 1986
- Running time: 60 minutes
- Country: United States
- Language: English
- Budget: US$15,000

Bird in a Cage is a 1986 American comedic drama film written and directed by Antonio Zarro while he was attending the CBN University (now Regent University).

== Production ==
Zarro's original script for the film had the two leads dying, but this was changed when CBN University associate professor and executive producer of the film Terry Lindvall felt "so many deaths would make the movie too much like a Shakespearean tragedy." He also recounted how a "blue tint applied at the film lab to turn a swimming scene from day to night made the heroine's pink bathing suit seem to disappear", which compelled Lindvall humorously to recommend a less suggestive swimming shot." Lead actor Timothy Wright also noted that the unexpected outcome resulting from the main character's ambiguous prayer added a powerful and deeply moving experience to the story. Following half a dozen National Student Academy Award finalists films, A Bird in a Cage won Regent (nee CBN) University its first National Student Academy Award in 1987. Turtle Races (producer Lisa Swain and director Jim Lincoln) would win a Silver Award in 1991.

== Premise ==
The film follows a thief into the countryside (away from the Norfolk, Virginia, zoo) where he is mistaken as a preacher, who is asked to pray for a young girl's healing and finds God's intervention a challenge to his own unbelief.

== Reception ==
Hal Erickson of All Movie Guide remarked that the director was a college student when he "lovingly assembled" the film, writing "The material is simple (and sometimes simplistic), but demands artistry. Novice filmmaker Antonio Zarro delivered that artistry."

== Accolades ==
- 1987, won Academy of Motion Picture Arts and Sciences Student Academy Award in 1987
