= The Last Days of Left Eye =

2007 Lisa Lopes documentary directed by Lauren Lazin

- DVD cover
- Directed by: Lauren Lazin
- Starring: Lisa Lopes
- Music by: Brent Lord; Michael Shaieb
- Country of origin: United States
- Original language: English

Production
- Producers: Reigndrop Lopes; Ronald Lopes
- Editor: David Beinstein
- Running time: 87 minutes

Original release
- Network: VH1
- Release: May 19, 2007

The Last Days of Left Eye is a documentary directed by Lauren Lazin that premiered on VH1 and VH1 Soul on May 19, 2007. Filmed from March 30, 2002 until her death on April 25, 2002, it centered on the life, last days spent in spiritual retreat in Honduras, and accidental death of rapper and TLC member Lisa Lopes (May 27, 1971 — April 25, 2002).

== Initial accident ==
During the course of filming the documentary, Lisa was driving a Montero SUV. There were nine passengers in the vehicle. The van had killed a child only a few weeks prior to this accident. Lisa thought that the spirit that was haunting her killed the child by mistake.

== Lopes' death ==
The video of Lopes' fatal accident, taken from within the Mitsubishi Montero Sport that rolled over into the grass, shows only events in the vehicle prior to the moment of impact. The coroner who performed her autopsy ruled her death an accident.

== Credits ==
- Director: Lauren Lazin
- Executive Producer: Shelly Tantro
- Executives for VH1: Michael Hirschorn and Brad Abramson
- Producers: Reigndrop Lopes, Ronald Lopes and Kate Garfield
- Associate Producers: Amy Goldberg and Steven Vannucci
- Video edit: David Beinstein
- Video: Todd Jones and Christofer Wagner
- Post sound: Sue Pelino and Doron Reizes
- Visual Effects: Fred Salkind, Stephanie Masarsky, and Anna Toonk
- Original Music: Michael Shaieb & Brent Lord, FatLab Music NYC
- Audio Editor: Andrew Daniel & Marcie Roy
