= The Ostrich Politic =

2018 French animated short film

- Directed by: HouHou
- Production company: Gobelins, l'École de l'image
- Distributed by: Miyu Distribution
- Release date: 15 November 2018
- Running time: 7 minutes
- Country: France

The Ostrich Politic is a 2018 French animated short film directed by HouHou during his studies at Gobelins, l'École de l'image French animation school.

== Plot ==
This short film, delivered with a poetic narration, follows ostriches carrying on their daily activities burying their heads, believing It's an instinctive behavior. However, one day a research by phylogeneticist Dr. Kays proves otherwise.

== Distribution ==
The short was acquired and broadcast online by ARTE channel and seen more than a million times online.

== Accolades ==
The short has been selected and awarded at several film festivals including Clermont-Ferrand International Short Film Festival, the Annecy International Animated Film Festival, and the LA shorts Fest where it won the Oscar Qualifying prize for "Best Animation".

It was also a Finalist at the Student Academy Awards and the BAFTA Student Film Awards for best student film in 2019.
