= Balloon (2019 American film) =

- Official film poster
- Directed by: Jeremy Merrifield
- Screenplay by: Jeremy Merrifield; Dave Testa
- Produced by: Christina Cha Kate Chamuris Alex Peurye
- Starring: Jonah Beres; Jaylin Ogle; Carson Severson; Paul Scheer
- Cinematography: Frances Kroon
- Edited by: Bowei Yue
- Music by: Ali Helnwein
- Production companies: AFI Conservatory; Dream Three Films
- Release date: February 28, 2019 (American Film Institute)
- Running time: 16 minutes
- Country: United States
- Language: English

Balloon is a 2019 American short coming-of-age fantasy drama film written and directed by Jeremy Merrifield and produced by Dream Three as Merrifield's thesis for the completion of his studies at the AFI Conservatory. It stars Jonah Beres and Paul Scheer.

Balloon was a finalist in the 2019 Student Academy Awards, in the category of best narrative.

== Plot ==
Junior high schooler, Sam Wheeler, participates in a school shooting drill with his classmates. While hiding in the classroom closet, another student, Jason, shares a video which shows Sam being punched in the face and crying. Sam's best friend Adam tells Jason to leave Sam alone.

That night, Sam discovers that the video has gone viral online, and receives demeaning texts from his classmates. While reading the texts, he realizes that he is floating in mid-air, and hits his head on the ceiling.

Sam discovers his 'sonic punch' ability after punching his reflection in his bathroom mirror.

The following day, Sam volunteers to climb a tall rope in gym class. As Sam climbs, he becomes lighter. He reaches the top of the rope and looks out the window at the treetops. However, after hearing the gym coach's whistle, he plummets hard to the ground. In the locker room showers, Jason pees on Sam as a joke. Everyone laughs. Adam doesn't intervene. Sam channels his newfound power into a shockwave which opens a row of gym lockers, but all of the boys are gone.

After school, Sam is approached by Jason, who is concerned that he may have told a teacher about his bullying. Sam uses his powers to jump high into the air and lands with his hand gripped around Jason's collar. A group of students circle them and encourage Sam to punch Jason. Sam releases a shockwave that destroys the students' phones, preventing them from filming the incident, and leaves. Adam follows him, and tries to show him support, but Sam rejects him—still hurt that Adam ghosted him earlier.

Sam enters a foresty clearning beside the school's campus, where he floats above the

and looks over the quiet suburban landscape. The end of the film leaves us questioning whether Sam's superpowers were real.

== Distribution ==
Balloon had its film festival premier at the Palm Springs International ShortFest in 2019. The film qualified for the Oscars by winning the Grand Prix at HollyShorts Film Festival in the same year and was nominated for a Student Academy Award.

The short film won Best Drama Series and The Seymour Bricker Humanitarian Award at the Academy of Television Arts & Sciences Foundation’s 40th annual College Television Awards.

== Reception ==
IndieWire compared the film to Joker, saying where that film "explores the genesis of a villain," Balloon "depicts the making of a hero," and is a "critique of the superhero mythos, offering an alternative world that prizes softness and sensitivity over brute strength."

== Accolades ==
Year	Presenter/Festival	Award/Ceremony	Status
2020	College Television Awards	Best Drama Series	Won
2020	College Television Awards	Seymour Bricker Humanitarian Award	Won
2020	Cannes	Lion Young Director Award	Won
2019	HollyShorts Film Festival	Grand Prix (Oscar Qualifying)	Won
2019	New Orleans Film Festival	Audience Award / Jury Special Mention	Won
2019	Napa Valley Film Festival	Best Narrative Short	Won
2019	Student Academy Awards	Best Narrative (Domestic)	Nominated
2019	Palm Springs International Short Fest	Best Student Short	Nominated
2019	American Society of Cinematographers	Heritage Award	Nominated
