= L Word Mississippi: Hate the Sin =

2014 documentary film directed by Lauren Lazin

- Film poster
- Directed by: Lauren Lazin
- Country of origin: United States
- Original language: English

Production
- Producer: Ilene Chaiken
- Running time: 90 minutes

Original release
- Network: Showtime
- Release: August 8, 2014

L Word Mississippi: Hate the Sin is a 2014 American documentary television film directed by Lauren Lazin. Produced by Ilene Chaiken as part of The L Word franchise, it premiered on Showtime on August 8, 2014. The film follows the lives of various lesbians living in the Bible Belt of the United States.

Filming lasted six to eight months in rural Mississippi. Lazin described the film as "much more about the hardships gay women face because of the religion they are brought up with."

L Word Mississippi: Hate the Sin received positive reviews, with critics praising its "heartbreaking" depiction of the real-life homophobia faced by gay women in rural parts of the Southern United States. It won the GLAAD Media Award for Outstanding Documentary in 2015.
