= Peter Hixson =

American animator

Peter Hixson (born October 31, 1966) is an American animation artist living in Los Angeles. He has worked in television animation for the past 15 years and presently supervises animation for DreamWorks Television's All Hail King Julien.

== Early life and career ==
Peter was born in Long Beach, California, as the second son of a US Navy officer. The family moved to Washington, D.C., soon after his birth and he grew up in Maryland and later the Hampton Roads area of southeast Virginia. Peter spent occasional bursts of energy drawing and sketching when not occupied with schoolwork and repairing old Saabs. He also was drawn into competitive swimming and sailing pursuits, qualifying for National Junior Olympics in distance freestyle events and competing for national junior sailor titles in both small dinghies and sailboards. Peter graduated from Tufts University in Medford, Massachusetts, with a BA in history in 1988. He later attended film school at American University in Washington, D.C. One of his animated student films, Five Female Persuasions, won a Student Academy Award in Animation in 1992. Another animated film, Tennis, won additional awards and screened in Spike and Mike's Sick and Twisted Animation festivals.

Peter moved to Los Angeles in 1993 and started at Klasky-Csupo Animation Studios, where he worked as an animation story editor and later as an animation timer. He has worked at a handful of Los Angeles animation studios on cable and broadcast animation series, including Real Monsters, Duckman, Wild Thornberries, Mission Hill, The Oblongs, The Simpsons, Futurama, Penguins of Madagascar, Monsters Vs. Aliens and All Hail King Julien.
