= Once Upon a Line =

- Directed by: Alicja Jasina
- Written by: Alicja Jasina
- Produced by: Alicja Jasina
- Release date: July 2016
- Running time: 8 minutes
- Country: United States
- Language: English

Once Upon a Line is a 2016 animated-short film directed, written and produced by Alicja Jasina, then a student at the University of Southern California. It won the Best Animation Gold Award at Student Academy Awards and was shortlisted with ten other short-films from 69 entries submitted to the 89th Academy Awards in Academy Award for Best Animated Short Film category, but did not make the final cut.

== Plot ==
A man leads a boring life until he falls in love. Things get out of control, but at the end, the protagonist discovers that there are other ways of living and that the world is full of color and hope.

== Accolades ==
- 43rd Annual Student Film Awards - Best Animation Gold Winner.
- Shortlisted for an Academy Award for Best Animated Short Film

== See also ==
- 2016 in animation
- University of Southern California
