= The Mute's House =

- Release date: 2015
- Country: Israel

The Mute's House is a 2015 Israeli documentary film directed by Tamar Kay about the Rajabi's, a single mother and her son, both Palestinians living in the Jewish quarter of the West Bank city of Hebron. The film was produced by Ariel Richter and Tamar Kay as their thesis film at The Jerusalem Sam Spiegel Film & Television School. The film was well received by critics and audiences. In October 2016, the film was listed as one of the 10 shortlisted films to compete for the 89th Academy Award's Best Documentary Short Subject.

== Story ==
A building in Hebron, which has been deserted by its Palestinian owners, is called “The Mute's House" by the Israeli soldiers stationed there and by the tour guides who pass by. The building's only occupants are a deaf woman, Sahar, and her eight-year-old son, Yousef. The family's story, which unfolds against the backdrop of the Israeli-Palestinian conflict, is told through the eyes of the young and charismatic Yousef, as he goes through his daily routine in both the Jewish and Muslim areas of a city torn apart by hatred and violence.

== Release & Reception ==
The film premiered in November 2015 at IDFA, and has participated in over 20 international film festivals since. It premiered on Israel's Channel 8 on January 21, 2017. The film has received mostly positive reactions and reviews. As the film deals with the politically volatile subject of the West Bank, there has been some criticism by both right and left wing audiences regarding the representation of the city and its residents.

== Awards and nominations ==
Awards & Nominations
Festival/Ceremony	Year	Award	Result
Kraków Film Festival	2016	Best Short Film	Won
IDFA - International Documentary Festival Amsterdam	2015	Special Jury Award for Student Documentary	Won
St. Louis International Film Festival	2016	Best Documentary Short	Won
Full Frame Documentary Film Festival	2016	Best Student Film	Won
Docaviv- Tel Aviv International Documentary Film Festival	2016	Best Student Film	Won
Jerusalem Film Festival	2016	Best Documentary Short	Won
The Israeli Documentary Filmmakers Forum Awards	2016	Best Student Film	Won
Early Bird International Student Film Festival	2016	Best Documentary	Won
Montefeltro Film School Festival	2016	Best Film	Won
International Federation of Film Societies	2016	Best Short Film	Special Mention
Flickerfest International Short Film Festival	2017	Best Documentary Short	Special Mention
Student Academy Awards	2016	Best Foreign Documentary	Finalist
The Tel Aviv International Student Film Festival	2016	Best Documentary Film	Finalist
The Ophir Awards	2016	Best Documentary Short Subject	Nominated
