= An Ostrich Told Me the World Is Fake and I Think I Believe It =

- Directed by: Lachlan Pendragon
- Written by: Lachlan Pendragon
- Produced by: Donna Hamilton
- Starring: Lachlan Pendragon; John Cavanagh; Michael Richard; Jamie Trotter
- Music by: Envato Market
- Animation by: Lachlan Pendragon
- Production company: Griffith Film School
- Release date: 2021
- Running time: 11 minutes
- Country: Australia
- Language: English

An Ostrich Told Me the World Is Fake and I Think I Believe It is a 2021 Australian stop-motion-animated short film written, directed and animated by Lachlan Pendragon. It was nominated for the Best Animated Short at the 95th Academy Awards in 2023.

== Summary ==
Neil is an office worker, trying and failing to sell toasters from his cubicle, and is threatened with termination by his boss. Gradually, he begins to experience hallucinations of his world being fake, including seeing the blinking green-screen and realizing that some props are missing from his coworkers' cubicles. After falling asleep at work, he wakes up to encounter an ostrich, who confirms that the world is a "sham", and challenges Neil to take a closer look at his surroundings. When investigating a nearby storeroom, Neil falls outside of the stop-motion animation set, where he is retrieved by the creator after finding a prop box full of his own mouths.

The next morning, Neil arrives at work and is shocked to find all of the office furniture changed. A coworker, Gaven, claims that it had been a decision by corporate, but Neil, remembering the ostrich's words, is convinced that it's a sign that their world is fake. He returns to the storeroom, but is shocked to find it full of ordinary furniture. Desperate to prove his point, he successfully rips off Gaven's mouth, which breaks the world and leads the creator to intervene. Neil escapes the creator's hand and falls off the set again, breaking into many pieces near an outlet, where he stops moving.

The creator then works at their computer, where it is revealed that Neil and all of his coworkers are merely figures in a stop-motion commercial advertising upgraded office furniture, with an ostrich as the company mascot. Neil's broken body is retrieved and thrown into a box of "broken bits," before being replaced by a one of many identical Neil figurines. Neil then wakes up at his desk, and after being confronted by his boss due to his poor performance, he abruptly quits.

== Voice cast ==
- Lachlan Pendragon as Neil
- John Cavanagh as The Ostrich
- Michael Richard as Bill the Boss
- Jamie Trotter as Gaven

== Accolades ==
An Ostrich Told Me the World Is Fake and I Think I Believe It was honoured at the Student Academy Awards in 2022.

It was nominated for the Best Animated Short at the 95th Academy Awards in 2023.

== See also ==
- Postmodernist film
