= Antonio Zarro =

Italian-American director and actor

- Born: Antonio Zarro; August 17, 1970 (age 55); Rome, Italy
- Occupation(s): Film director, actor
- Years active: 1985–present

Antonio Zarro (born August 17, 1970) is an Italian-American, director and actor. Zarro received a Student Academy Award in 1987 for Bird in a Cage, a 60-minute 1986 student film made while attending the Christian Broadcasting Network University (now Regent University) which received a positive review in the All Movie Guide. This film was the first from CBNU to win an Academy Award.

== Career ==
His work has screened at the NY Film Festival, the Chicago Film Festival, the Virginia Festival of American Film, the Columbus Film Festival, Worldfest-Houston and Worldfest-Flagstaff. A few of Zarro's awards include: a student Academy Award, a Cine Golden Eagle, a Telly, an Addy, a Mercury Award, a Questar, an Aurora Award, an Axion and an Apex. He is a member of the Screen Actors Guild, and he acts in movies, television and the theatre. In 1998, Zarro established the Zarro Acting Academy, training film actors on the East Coast. His classes have given numerous students a start in major motion pictures, prime time television and national cable shows.

In addition, he taught as an adjunct instructor at Regent University (1989–1991) in Virginia Beach, Virginia and Old Dominion University (2001–2006) in Norfolk, Virginia. During his undergrad years, Zarro was President of the Communications chapter of Alpha Epsilon Rho and his video dramas won regional and national awards. In 1986, he wrote and directed a student film Bird in a Cage, which won a Student Academy Award. He has a BA from the University of Tulsa in Television and Theatre and an MA from Regent in Film. He made an uncredited appearance as a soldier in the Ted Turner film Gods and Generals.

He is currently an assistant professor of cinema-television at Palm Beach Atlantic University.

== Film ==
Year	Film	Credited as				Role
Year	Film	Director	Producer	Screenwriter	Actor	Role
1985	Love Struck					Director of Photography
1986	Bird in a Cage	Yes		Yes		
1989	Carmencita	Yes	Yes	Yes		
2003	Gods and Generals				Yes	Soldier
2009	Clive				Yes	Thief
2010	Animus				Yes	Vince

== Television ==
Year	Film	Credited as				Role
Year	Film	Director	Producer	Screenwriter	Actor	Role
1998	Avoiding Sexual Harassment	Yes	Yes			
