= Kavi (2009 film) =

2009 Short Film

- Directed by: Gregg Helvey
- Screenplay by: Gregg Helvey
- Produced by: Gregg Helvey; Guneet Monga Kapoor; Tom Rice; Harish Amin
- Cinematography: John Harrison
- Edited by: Chris Witt
- Music by: Patrick Kirst; Paul Z. Livingstone
- Release date: April 17, 2009 (NashFilm)
- Running time: 19 minutes
- Countries: India; America
- Language: Hindi

Kavi is a 2009 American Hindi-language short film written and directed by Gregg Helvey. The film about a young boy trapped in child labour was nominated for the Academy Award for Best Live Action Short Film in 2010. Prior to this, it won the gold medal in the Narrative category at the 36th Annual Student Academy Awards in 2009.

== Summary ==
A young boy in India dreams of going to school and playing cricket, but instead is forced to work as a modern-day slave in a brick kiln. As he begins to question his circumstances, he must decide whether to risk everything for freedom.

== Cast ==
- Sagar Salunkhe as Kavi
- Ulhas Tayade as Boss
- Rajesh Kumar as Father
- Madhavi Juvekar as Mother
- Dibyendu Bhattacharya as Social Worker 1
- Rishi Raj Singh as Social Worker 2
- Mukesh Bharati

== Production ==
The film was shot on a shoestring budget in and around Wai, near Mumbai.
