= BYU Center for Animation =

Animation school of Brigham Young University

- Motto: The Happiest Place on Campus
- Type: Private
- Established: 2010
- Director: Kelly Loosli
- Academic staff: 6 full time
- Undergraduates: 70
- Location: Provo, Utah, United States
- Website: animation.byu.edu

BYU Center for Animation is an American animation school at Brigham Young University (BYU). The program is a leading university animation program in the United States and has collected 22 College Television Awards "Student Emmys" and 7 Student Academy Awards.

Students enter the program through one of two academic tracks: an animation route to graduate with a BFA in Animation or through the computer science route to graduate with a BA in Computer Science: Animation and Games emphasis. Students from the program have gone on to work at major studios including Walt Disney Animation Studios, Pixar Animation Studios, Blue Sky Studios, DreamWorks Animation, and Blizzard Entertainment. BYU's animation program touts 40 alumni at DreamWorks and 15 at Pixar. BYU animation student Emron Grover, for example, was the digital tailor for Pixar's Coco.

Ed Catmull, former president of Pixar Animation Studios and Walt Disney Animation Studios, visited BYU and remarked, "It's the perception not just of Pixar, but also at the other studios, that something pretty remarkable is happening here."

== History ==
Architectural designer R. Brent Adams was teaching evening classes at BYU and championed the creation of a BYU animation program. Donors including Ira A. Fulton provided the funding and supercomputer to establish the program in 2010. An early gift of software from Toronto-based Alias Wavefront, valued at $4 million, helped establish the department's technology base.

For 10 years, the center operated under the direction of three colleges including the Ira A. Fulton College of Engineering and Technology, the College of Fine Arts and Communications, and the College of Physical and Mathematical Sciences. In 2012, in part to help foster a better connection between students and the Computer Science Department, the center was moved from the Ira A. Fulton College of Engineering and Technology to the College of Physical and Mathematical Sciences. In 2018, the BYU Center for Animation was ranked #1 of the Top 10 Animation Schools and Colleges with BS Programs by Animation Career Review. Adams claims that "a high percentage of graduates of his program get hired by Disney, Pixar, DreamWorks, Sony and other major animation studios."

== Awards and notable alumni ==
In the program's first year it won both a Student Emmy from the Academy of Television Arts and Sciences and a Student Academy Award from the Academy of Motion Picture Arts and Sciences. The center has won 22 student Emmys and been nominated for 19 student Emmys including 2019's Grendel. They have also won Nickelodeon's Producers’ Choice Award and Viewers’ Choice Award, and has been invited to show at Sundance Film Festival and the Cannes Film Festival. Dan Lemmon, Academy Award winner, was one of the early students in the BYU Center for Animation.

Academy of Motion Picture Arts and Sciences; Student Academy Awards Awards

- Grendel - 2019
- Owned - 2014
- Kites - 2009
- Pajama Gladiator - 2009
- Turtles - 2006
- Lemmings - 2004
