= Gregg Helvey =

American film maker

- Education: University of Southern California
- Occupations: Writer, Director

Gregg Helvey is an American filmmaker. He is best known for his short film Kavi, which was nominated for the Academy Award for Best Live Action Short Film at the 82nd Academy Awards and also won the gold medal in the narrative category at the 36th Annual Student Academy Awards.

== Early life and education ==
Helvey grew up in Northern Virginia, and where he attended and graduated from Blue Ridge Middle School and Loudoun Valley High School. He earned a Bachelor of Arts in English and French from the University of Virginia. He later received a Master of Fine Arts (MFA) in Film Production from the University of Southern California's School of Cinematic Arts.

== Filmography ==
- Overexposed (2006)
- The Partner (2007)
- Kavi (2009)
- Rising From Ashes (2012)
