= Housecats (film) =

- Housecats title card
- Directed by: Peg McClure
- Written by: Peg McClure
- Produced by: Todd Flinchbaugh
- Music by: Gerry Burnett
- Release date: 1985
- Running time: 3 minutes, 32 seconds
- Country: United States
- Language: English

Housecats is an American 1985 Student Academy Award winning animated short film written, directed and animated by Peg McClure and produced by Todd Flinchbaugh at De Anza College in Cupertino, California.

== Plot ==
The short follows two housecats, a black cat named Scratch and a tabby named Squeak. The short starts with Scratch trying to take a nap near a radiator, only for Squeak to interfere by rolling onto Scratch while laying nearby. This intrusion proves to be a reoccurring issue for Scratch, as Squeak follows them around the home and unintentionally causes the black cat distress. Scratch's attempts at revenge typically backfire. Each attempt leaves Scratch increasingly more agitated and scuffed, until the black cat decides to once again attempt to nap. Squeak again lies down nearby and rolls over onto Scratch. This infuriates Scratch, who begins to swell with rage, only to be mollified when Squeak licks their fur. A now calm and resigned Scratch then chooses to close their eyes and rest alongside Squeak.

== Development ==
Peg McClure began working on Housecats while attending classes in the animation department of De Anza College in Cupertino, California where her animation instructor was Todd Flinchbaugh. McClure has cited Chuck Jones as an influence on her work as well as two cats that she rescued from a Sacramento animal shelter. She has stated that many of the jokes in Housecats are based on real-life exchanges between the two cats. McClure's first draft of the short was done in pencil in order to get a feel of the action, after which she tested out various colors to find the right shades for the final version. The film's music was composed by Gerry Burnett, a fellow De Anza student. The short took approximately 3 1/2 years to complete and required almost 2,000 drawings.

== Release ==
Housecats premiered in 1985 and went on to screen at multiple film festivals such as the Festival of Animation and Palo Alto Film Festival. It was later screened on cable TV networks such as HBO and Nickelodeon, and was included in a compilation VHS entitled Best of the Fests for Kids.

== Critical reception ==
Peninsula Times Tribune, "Cartoon slapstick in the classic vein."

Los Angeles Times, "Additional viewings only make it increasingly clear that the jokes in Peg McClure's "Housecats" (U.S.) are neither well timed nor well animated."

== Awards ==
Housecats was the winner of Achievement in Animation at the 13th Annual Student Academy Awards on June 8, 1986. This win marked the first time that a community college had won the award; at that point in time most winning animations were produced by the California Institute of the Arts. Housecats also won first place at the 1986 ASIFA East Festival and first place in the Animation category at the 1986 FOCUS Awards.
