= Chicks in White Satin =

1994 film

- Directed by: Elaine Holliman
- Produced by: Jason Schneider
- Cinematography: Karin Stellwagen
- Edited by: Simeon Hutner and Carolyn Rouse
- Production company: USC School of Cinema-Television
- Release date: 1993
- Running time: 25 minutes
- Country: United States
- Language: English

Chicks in White Satin is a 1993 American short documentary film directed by Elaine Holliman and was nominated for an Academy Award for Best Documentary Short.

== Summary ==
The film explores a Jewish same-sex marriage between two lesbians, including interviews with the Rabbi and various family members.

== Accolades ==
- Nominated for an Academy Award for Best Documentary Short Subject.

== See also ==
- 1993 in film
- List of LGBT-related films
