= Griffith Film School =

Film school in Brisbane, Australia

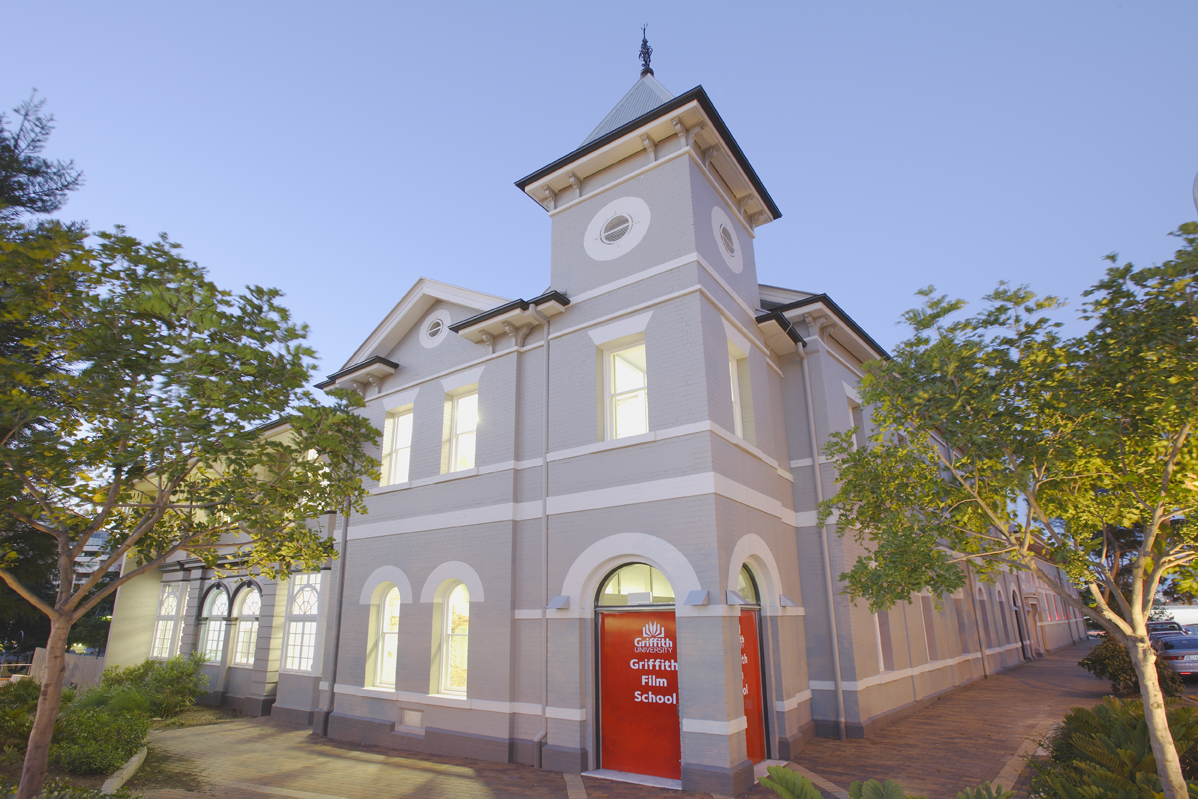
- Main entrance of the Griffith Film School
- Established: 2004
- Vice-Chancellor: Carolyn Evans
- Director: Chris Carter
- Faculty: 25
- Undergraduates: 700
- Postgraduates: 50
- Location: South Bank, Queensland, Australia
- Campus: Southbank
- Website: Griffith Film School

Griffith Film School (GFS) is a media production baccalaureate college that is part of Griffith University, located in Brisbane, Queensland, Australia. Bachelor's degrees range from film and television production, animation, and game design. It is housed in the heritage-listed former South Brisbane Library.

== History ==
For some years before the foundation of the film school, film courses were offered at the Queensland College of Art, which had been annexed to the university in the early 1990s.

Griffith Film School (GFS) was established in 2004, and received CILECT full membership (international accreditation) in 2005.

== Location ==
The film school is housed in the heritage-listed former South Brisbane Library in Brisbane. It is part of Griffith University.

== Degrees and diplomas ==
=== Bachelor ===
As of 2024 its bachelor degree courses include:

- Bachelor of Film and Screen Media Production
- Bachelor of Animation
- Bachelor of Games Design

=== Post-graduate ===
- Graduate Certificate in Screen Production
- Graduate Diploma of Screen Production
- Master of Screen Production

The Master of Screen Production offers two majors:

- Advanced Screen Production is designed for early career/emerging filmmakers to specialise in Cinematography, Documentary, Serial Writing, Producing, Production Design, VFX Specialisation and Directing
- Digital Filmmaking is designed for postgraduate students looking to explore the craft of screen-based storytelling.

== LiveLab ==
LiveLab is the commercial film production arm of Griffith Film School.

== Artists in residence ==
The Griffith Film School invites and hosts a number of artists in residence to consult and mentor the students in an intensive mode. These artists have included:

- Wayne Blair
- Ben Young
- Axel Grigor
- David Puttnam
- Anthony Mullins
- Vytis Puronas
- Tait Brady
- Mark Travis
- Myrna Gawryn
- Kim Farrant
- Peter James

== External engagement ==
The Griffith Film School became the third Australian full member of Centre International de Liaison des Ecoles de Cinéma et de Télévision (CILECT) in 2005. In November 2016, the Griffith Film School hosted the CILECT Congress, with the theme "Ethics: Aesthetics".

The Griffith Film School was one of the inaugural founders of the Australian Screen Production, Education and Research Association (ASPERA).

== Notable alumni ==
- Angie Fielder, producer
- Peter Hegedus, award-winning documentary writer, director and producer
- Lachlan Pendragon, Oscar-nominated for his student film An Ostrich Told Me the World Is Fake and I Think I Believe It
- Sankalp Reddy, director (The Ghazi Attack)
- Peter Spierig, Australian film director, producer, and writer
- Michael Spierig, Australian film director, producer, and writer
- Lucas Taylor, screenwriter and director
- Joe Brumm, creator of Bluey
- Steve Jaggi, producer
