= The Flapper Story =

The Flapper Story is a 1985 American student film by Lauren Lazin.

== Synopsis ==
The film is a look back at the 1920s phenomenon known as "the Flapper" featuring interviews with the surviving women reflecting on their youthful lives and archival footage of that era.

== Production ==
The film was made while Lazin was at Stanford University.

== Accolades ==
It premiered at the Museum of Modern Art's New Directors/New Films series and won a Student Academy Award.
