= The L Word season 2 =

The L Word
- Season 2
- No. of episodes: 13

Release
- Original network: Showtime
- Original release: February 20 – May 15, 2005

Season chronology
- ← Previous; Season 1 Next → Season 3

The second season of The L Word originally aired on Showtime from February 20, 2005 to May 15, 2005 and featured 13 episodes. It starts by unveiling to the viewers a secret Tina is keeping from everyone: she successfully became impregnated after a second insemination. Tina and Bette are still apart. Bette doesn't deny the affair and begs Tina for forgiveness but later alienates herself from the group and continues the affair for a short while until realizing that it's Tina she wants to spend her life with, not Candace and so ends their short affair. Tina begins seeing Helena, while Bette’s life is portrayed as a wreck, with alcohol abuse, problems with her job, the death of her father and being fired during the season finale. Tina and Bette reconcile during the final episode. The character of Marina was written out of the show and the Planet was bought by Kit Porter.

== Cast and characters ==
Actor/Actress	Character
Mia Kirshner	Jenny Schecter
Jennifer Beals	Bette Porter
Laurel Holloman	Tina Kennard
Leisha Hailey	Alice Pieszecki
Katherine Moennig	Shane McCutcheon
Pam Grier	Kit Porter
Erin Daniels	Dana Fairbanks

== Episodes ==
No. overall	No. in season	Title	Directed by	Written by	Original release date
15	1	"Life, Loss, Leaving"	Dan Minahan	Ilene Chaiken	February 20, 2005
Five months later. Bette desperately begs for forgiveness from Tina over her affair with Candace. But Tina is revealed to be hiding a shocking secret from her friends that she happens to be pregnant again. Alice and Dana continue to hide their romantic tryst from the others, including Tonya. Jenny finds herself with writer's block and saying an emotional goodbye to Tim as he prepares to leave town for a job in Ohio. Shane lands a new lover, a part-time DJ named Carmen de la Pica Morales (Sarah Shahi), whom she meets at a movie studio while doing hairstyling. With Marina gone after learning of her nervous breakdown and her attempted suicide, Kit decides to buy The Planet and continues to have mixed feelings over hanging out with Ivan (Kelly Lynch).
16	2	"Lap Dance"	Lynne Stopkewich	Ilene Chaiken	February 27, 2005
Tina hires a feminist lesbian lawyer named Joyce Wischnia (Jane Lynch) to help with her separation from Bette. Dana and Tonya have a get-together with Dana's parents to discuss their upcoming nuptials. Ivan gives Kit the cold shoulder as she prepares to finalize her purchase of The Planet coffeehouse from Marina's visiting estranged husband. Jenny enrolls in a creative writing class at UCLA taught by the stern and cynical Charlotte Birch (Sandra Bernhard) in which the latest writing assignment makes Jenny decide to break up with Robin after she discovers Robin wishes to marry her. Dana and Tonya take Alice, Shane and Tina for a night on the town to a strip club where a girl, who looks like Bette, dances in front of her.
17	3	"Loneliest Number"	Rose Troche	Lara Spotts	March 6, 2005
When she is rejected from the writing class of Charlotte Birch, Jenny sets out to win over her intimidating professor by writing a page based on her life story. Shane moves in with Jenny at the house. When Jenny meets Carmen for the first time, an attraction between them develops almost at once. Bette goes on a downward spiral over Tina's lawsuit. Joyce also offers Tina a place to stay at her guest house during her legal battle. Dana and Alice continue to hide their attraction, while Tonya decides to make a show of her impending marriage to Dana. Kit tries to find an opening act for The Planet's grand re-opening and things heat up, then cool down, between Shane and Carmen. Tina is devastated when she finds an e-mail love letter from Candace on Bette's computer.
18	4	"Lynch Pin"	Lisa Cholodenko	Ilene Chaiken	March 13, 2005
Bette travels to New York on business to ask for continued funding for the California Art Center from Helena Peabody (Rachel Shelley), the English daughter of Peggy Peabody, who takes over her mother's business after Peggy's retirement. Back in Los Angeles, Tina is shocked and angry when Joyce makes a pass at her, having slept with a number of her past clients. Jenny and Shane search for a new roommate, but they have no luck with interviews until a dashing young film maker, named Mark Wayland (Eric Lively), drops by and charms both of them. Kit bonds with an inspirational speaker named Benjamin Bradshaw (Charles S. Dutton). Shane has a run-in with Veronica Bloom (Camryn Manheim), a ruthless and egotistical movie producer, who offers Shane a job as her personal assistant.
19	5	"Labyrinth"	Burr Steers	Rose Troche	March 20, 2005
Bette tries to fix her relationship with Tina who temporarily settles in the house. Bette also gets some bad news at work when Helena Peabody arrives in Los Angeles to stay and maliciously withdraws her grant from the CAC and gives a $100,000 grant to Tina's social work office. Things go from bad to worse for Bette when she later finds out that she was the last to know about Tina's pregnancy. Alice and Dana try taking their secret relationship to a different level with new sexual positions. Tonya throws a bachelorette party at The Planet with Dana's and Tonya's mothers in attendance and Carmen as the DJ. Shane starts her new job as the PA to Veronica Bloom. Jenny gets some confidence from her new shortened hairstyle, while Mark launches a new video project, with both Jenny and Shane being the center of it.
20	6	"Lagrimas de Oro"	Jeremy Podeswa	Guinevere Turner	March 27, 2005
Alice pushes Dana to break up with Tonya after a major tennis tournament. Though Dana politely ends the engagement, she is shocked when Tonya agrees and reveals she too was having an affair behind Dana's back. Tina considers her new attraction to Helena as she moves out of Bette's place for the second time. Kit finally hooks up with Benjamin and persuades a lonely Bette to attend one of his seminars. Following Charlotte Birch's advice, Jenny decides to bond more with Carmen. Also, Mark becomes more obsessed with Shane leading him to hire a prostitute to seduce her... so he can secretly videotape it.
21	7	"Luminous"	Ernest Dickerson	Ilene Chaiken	April 3, 2005
Shane tries to dull her pain by a day at a health spa with Veronica in the hopes that she can forget about Carmen and Jenny's blossoming relationship. Later, Mark ends up saving Shane's life when she gets into a local brawl. Tina comes between Helena and her ex-lover, Winnie Mann, over custody of their two young children. Bette also sees a glimmer of hope in her life when she meets the California Art Center's new sponsor and word gets around of her single status. Jenny continues writing her novel for Charlotte's writing class and comes into issues with her classmate Hunter. Dana and Alice call everyone to The Planet to announce their romantic relationship where Kit throws a party for them.
22	8	"Loyal"	Alison Maclean	A. M. Homes	April 10, 2005
When Alice tries to catch up on her latest journalism assignment, she accidentally runs into her ex-lover Gabby and is more surprised to find out that Gabby is now dating Dana's ex-girlfriend, Lara. Bette and Tina try to reach an agreement over their relationship, as Tina goes house-hunting with Helena who comes on board the CAC's board of directors. Bette meets Winnie who wants to recruit Bette over helping her win her custody battle over Winnie and Helena's kids. Jenny is worried that she may have lost the job of ghost-writing a TV star named Burr Connor's autobiography because she lets it slip out about her lesbianism. Mark and his pal, Gomey, meet with a sleazy producer for their lesbian reality video, while Shane finds some comfort in a church over her recent emotional setbacks.
23	9	"Late, Later, Latent"	Tony Goldwyn	David Stenn	April 17, 2005
Dana is stunned when Alice requests a bold sexual favor from her. Charlotte Birch sets up Jenny with another meeting with Burr Connor to ghost write his autobiography where he privately reveals to Jenny that he too happens to be gay. Jenny also finds out about Mark's voyeurism when she accidentally sees on a videotape Carmen revealing her real feelings for Shane. Mark's producer, dissatisfied that there still isn't enough sex or nudity in his lesbian reality video, terminates Mark's employment. Kit plans a romantic night for Benjamin, but it doesn't end well when Benjamin cancels and Kit ends up at an AA meeting where Ivan is in attendance. Bette and Tina, slowly bonding over their unborn baby, have sex, but Tina goes back to renew her relationship with Helena.
24	10	"Land Ahoy"	Tricia Brock	Ilene Chaiken	April 24, 2005
Dana, Alice, Shane, Carmen and Jenny take an eventful Olivia Cruise on a ship around the Caribbean. Alice and Dana attempt to role-play as characters from "The Love Boat," only to end up with Dana becoming seasick. Both Carmen and Shane question Jenny's moody behavior throughout the trip especially when she tries to hook them up. Back in Los Angeles, Bette and Kit struggle to reconcile with their estranged father, Melvin, who comes for a visit. Tina attends a formal dinner banquet with Helena to receive a prestigious award for Tina's social work. Tina asks Bette to date her. Following Jenny's confrontation with Mark, he decides to come clean to Shane about his secret videotaping of her.
25	11	"Loud and Proud"	Rose Troche	Elizabeth Hunter	May 1, 2005
Dana is stunned when she learns a big secret about her younger brother, Howie, who had joined her at the annual Gay Pride Parade of 2005. Mark tries to make amends with Jenny and Shane after his confession about his secret videotaping of them. Kit and Bette keep a hospital bedside vigil for their father, Melvin, after learning that he has advanced prostate cancer and is refusing treatment. Tina also brings Helena along to the Gay Pride Parade, while Shane decides to try to open up to Carmen. Jenny uncovers a long-repressed and shocking memory about her childhood after visiting a bondage club.
26	12	"L'Chaim"	John Curran	Ilene Chaiken	May 8, 2005
Bette reaches out to Tina as she and Kit decide to take her father home to Bette's house from the hospital for his final days. Jenny struggles to compose herself after recalling a difficult memory from her childhood, prompting her to perform at a strip club. Alice becomes jealous when Lara Perkins, Dana's ex-girlfriend, meets Dana for dinner. Shane continues to reach out to Carmen. Mark continues making efforts to reconcile with Jenny and Shane.
27	13	"Lacuna"	Ilene Chaiken	Ilene Chaiken	May 15, 2005
Melvin Porter's funeral service is held at The Planet. Mark videotapes the event which is attended by a surprise guest, Gloria Steinem, where Bette gets stunning news about her job when her boss, Franklin, fires her, but Mark ends up with a job offer of his own. Tina goes into a surprisingly difficult labor and is forced to go to the hospital as the situation gets more difficult... and dangerous. Jenny finally reaches her breaking point over her painful childhood memory. Meanwhile, Alice continues to struggle with her jealousy over Dana being around Lara, which prompts Dana to decide to speak with Lara to get closure on their previous relationship. Elsewhere, Peggy Peabody arrives in Los Angeles and lays down the laws with Helena over her custody battle with Winnie for their two kids. Also, Shane finally decides to try out a relationship with Carmen.
