= The L Word season 4 =

The L Word
- Season 4
- No. of episodes: 12

Release
- Original network: Showtime
- Original release: January 7 – March 25, 2007

Season chronology
- ← Previous; Season 3 Next → Season 5

The fourth season of The L Word premiered on January 7, 2007 and ended on March 25, 2007. 12 episodes were produced this season.

== Cast ==
Actor/Actress	Character
Mia Kirshner	Jenny Schecter
Jennifer Beals	Bette Porter
Laurel Holloman	Tina Kennard
Leisha Hailey	Alice Pieszecki
Katherine Moennig	Shane McCutcheon
Pam Grier	Kit Porter

== Production ==
Showtime announced a renewal of the series, in a February 2, 2006, press release:

On the heels of a year highlighted by industry recognition and critical acclaim for its award-winning original programming including Weeds, Huff and Sleeper Cell, Showtime has ordered a fourth season of its hit drama series The L Word.

The filming of the season's twelve episodes began in Vancouver, on May 29, 2006.

New cast members for the show's fourth season included Academy-Award winner Marlee Matlin, three time Golden Globe winner Cybill Shepherd, Kristanna Loken, Rose Rollins, Jessica Capshaw and Janina Gavankar. Karina Lombard reprised her role as Marina Ferrer for two episodes. Film and television star Annabella Sciorra guest-starred in several episodes as lesbian film director Kate Arden, chosen to direct the film version of Jenny's story Lez Girls.

== Episodes ==
No. overall	No. in season	Title	Directed by	Written by	Original release date
40	1	"Legend in the Making"	Bronwen Hughes	Ilene Chaiken	January 7, 2007
Bette contemplates leaving the country with her daughter, but an intervention by Joyce Wischnia forces Bette and Tina to come to a compromise. Meanwhile, Shane is an emotional wreck and goes on a drug and alcohol binge with her old lover Cherie Jaffe while trying to get over her aborted wedding to Carmen. Alice helps Helena adjust to living at middle class standards after being financially cut off. Max attends a support group for FTM (Female to Male) individuals, while Kit has trouble with her pregnancy and must struggle with a hard decision. When Shane returns home after crashing Cherie's car, she discovers her step-mother Carla is waiting for her to tell her that her father has walked out on her. Carla tells Shane she's left her a present and leaves. The "Present" is her half-brother Shay.
41	2	"Livin' La Vida Loca"	Marleen Gorris	Alexandra Kondracke	January 14, 2007
Alice meets Papi (Janina Gavankar), a sexually aggressive Latina girl who lights up on The Chart even more than Shane, with over 1,000 conquests. Jenny is interviewed by a lesbian writer, named Stacey Merkin (guest star Heather Matarazzo), on her new book. Bette starts her new job as the dean of California Art College and meets her new boss, Phyllis Kroll (Cybill Shepherd), who has some surprising news for her. After Helena's departure from the studio, a new guy, named Aaron, takes the reins as Tina's new boss. A homeless Helena asks to stay with Alice until she can find a place of her own. Max goes out on a date with a straight woman named Brooke, the daughter of his boss, who is not aware of his former gender.
42	3	"Lassoed"	Tricia Brock	Ilene Chaiken	January 21, 2007
Tina invites the girls over to her and Henry's house for a party, where they do not bond well with her conservative new friends. Kit throws a Western-themed party at the Planet where Bette's boss, Phyllis, wants a part of the action. Both Shane and Papi take an instant dislike to each other after they meet for the first time, while Phyllis has a different reaction after meeting Alice. Shane gives a penniless Helena a job at WAX. Shane babysits for her 10-year-old half-brother, Shay, after he is abandoned by her father and step-mother. Angus gets some good news over a record deal, but his band later drops him. Bette's new teaching assistant, Nadia (Jessica Capshaw), begins having romantic feelings for her. A revenge-seeking Jenny tries to dig up dirt on Stacey who panned her book.
43	4	"Layup"	Jessica Sharzer	Elizabeth Ziff	January 28, 2007
Bette deals with the consequences after controversial art by the liberal deaf artist, Jodi Lerner (Marlee Matlin), upsets a potential university donor. Papi challenges Alice to a basketball game. On the court, Jenny and the others reject Tina, who winds up playing for Papi's team. Max finally reveals himself as transgender to Brooke who does not take it gracefully. The vindictive Jenny plays on Stacey Merkin's girlfriend's sympathies to get back at her. Alice begins a sordid tryst with Phyllis. Elsewhere, Shane is forced to model for an underwear ad to pay for Shay's $5,000 medical costs after he breaks his arm.
44	5	"Lez Girls"	John Stockwell	Ilene Chaiken	February 4, 2007
Bette continues sleeping with Nadia, her teaching assistant. Alice gets Helena a job of catering a party that Phyllis is holding at her house, where Alice decides to end their steamy affair after she meets Phyllis' husband Leonard (Bruce Davison). Alice also gets angry and upset by one of Jenny's short stories which gets published in a magazine. Tina catches Angus in a compromising position with her nanny Hazel. Bette also continues to grow closer to Jodi during Phyllis's party. Shane meets Paige Sobel (Kristanna Loken), a single mother whose son is Shay's classmate.
45	6	"Luck Be a Lady"	Angela Robinson	Angela Robinson	February 11, 2007
Bette enjoys her new romance with Jodi while at the same time, she clashes with Tina over Angelica's pre-school choices, and weathers the fallout over Alice's breakup with Phyllis thinking that it could affect her job. Papi teaches Helena, Shane, and Alice how to play poker in preparation for a party hosted by high-stakes gambler Catherine Rothburg (Sandrine Holt). Meanwhile, Alice meets Tasha Williams (Rose Rollins), Papi's friend who reveals herself to be in the military service. Max backs up a female colleague at work when sexism cost her a well-deserved promotion. Elsewhere, Jenny's twisted plans to destroy Stacey backfire and haunt her instead.
46	7	"Lesson Number One"	Moises Kaufman	Ariel Schrag	February 18, 2007
Helena must decide whether or not she will sleep with the cynical and seductive Catharine to pay off her $50,000 gambling debt. As Bette and Jodi console Phyllis who is heartbroken over Alice, Bette discovers that Jodi does not believe in monogamy. Alice and Tasha begin building a relationship. Meanwhile, Tina fights to win the bid on Jenny’s book Lez Girls when her studio is interested in making a movie about it. Elsewhere, Shane and Paige visit Shay’s school after rumors develop involving their relationship.
47	8	"Lexington & Concord"	Jamie Babbit	Ilene Chaiken	February 25, 2007
A heated argument over politics turns into passion for both the left-wing Alice and the right-wing Tasha. Shane and Paige grow closer leading them to consummate their romance. Kit has a public breakdown during a musical gig at the Planet where she exposes Angus over his infidelity. Bette introduces Tina to her new lover Jodi. Jenny brings her investment agents to the Planet for a night out. Elsewhere, Catherine draws Helena into her life of gambling. Max meets Grace, a computer researcher who is interested in upscaling Alice's 'Chart' website.
48	9	"Lacy Lilting Lyrics"	Bronwen Hughes	Cherien Dabis	March 4, 2007
Jenny and Tina look for the right movie director for Jenny's screenplay, but they soon butt heads over creative differences. Phyllis' husband, Leonard, drops by unannounced at Alice's place where he ends up being consoled by Alice, Tasha, Helena, as well as Papi over his wife leaving him. Bette is falling hard for Jodi and lets her emotions and jealousy interfere with her work. Kit manages to crack through Papi's hard emotional outer shell... with unexpected consequences. Shane's estranged father, Gabriel, arrives to take Shay with him back to Portland.
49	10	"Little Boy Blue"	Karyn Kusama	Elizabeth Ziff	March 11, 2007
Kit's break-up with Angus causes her to relapse into drinking. Bette introduces Jodi to the rest of the girls during a dinner party at her house. But Bette's controlling and bossy attitude doesn't sit well with Jodi... or anyone else. Alice discovers potential investors on her website. Jenny and Tina finally agree on hiring a director, the lesbian feminist Kate Arden (guest star Annabella Sciorra), who becomes interested in Tina. Elsewhere, Max and Grace travel to his hometown for his mother's funeral, and they soon clash with Max's emotionally barren and bigoted father.
50	11	"Literary License To Kill"	John Stockwell	Ilene Chaiken	March 18, 2007
Bette finds out that Jodi's been offered a job at an art center in New York state, while Bette also becomes angered by her description in Jenny's book. Tasha's memories of her service in Iraq continue to haunt her, and she is ordered by her superior officer to keep her sexual orientation a secret. Meanwhile, Shane plans a surprise for Paige on her birthday. Tina has a talk with Henry about how distant they have become with each other. Kit continues her downward spiral into drinking. Helena is kicked out of her hotel suite, and Max comes to a decision regarding his job and his life with Grace.
51	12	"Long Time Coming"	Ilene Chaiken	Ilene Chaiken	March 25, 2007
Paige decides it's time to explain to her son, Jared, the truth about her relationship with Shane. Alice has a hard time accepting that Tasha is heading back to Iraq for another tour of duty. Helena looks for a way out from Catherine's financial clutches and seizes an opportunity to get out of the gambling high life. Papi helps spearhead a beach-side going away party for Tasha. Bette gets a heaping dose of honesty from Tina when she looks to her for advice on wooing back Jodi who's left for New York. Tina returns to the lesbian fold and Kate Arden lets her know she's interested. Phyllis gets more than legal advice from Joyce Wishina when she pursues a divorce from Leonard. Fearing that the unhinged Jenny may cause the studio to pull out of producing Lez Girls, Tina and Kate Arden unwisely decide to exclude her from a meeting with Aaron and the other studio executives. But Jenny finds out, disrupts the meeting, and apparently ruins the whole deal. Also, Max goes to San Francisco to decide if he wants his sex reassignment surgery.
