= The L Word season 5 =

Season of television series

The L Word
- Season 5
- No. of episodes: 12

Release
- Original network: Showtime
- Original release: January 6 – March 23, 2008

Season chronology
- ← Previous; Season 4 Next → Season 6

The fifth season of The L Word began airing on January 6, 2008 and ended on March 23, 2008. 12 episodes were produced.

== Cast ==
| Actor/Actress | Character |
|---|---|
| Mia Kirshner | Jenny Schecter |
| Jennifer Beals | Bette Porter |
| Laurel Holloman | Tina Kennard |
| Leisha Hailey | Alice Pieszecki |
| Katherine Moennig | Shane McCutcheon |
| Pam Grier | Kit Porter |
| Rose Rollins | Tasha Williams |
| Daniel Sea | Max Sweeney |
| Rachel Shelley | Helena Peabody |
| Marlee Matlin | Jodi Lerner |

== Episodes ==
| No. overall | No. in season | Title | Directed by | Written by | Original release date |
|---|---|---|---|---|---|
| 52 | 1 | "LGB Tease" | Angela Robinson | Ilene Chaiken | January 6, 2008 |
Bette's gesture of good faith to Jodi backfires when she returns home. Shane experiences problems in her relationship with Paige and again falls back into old habits. Helena is sent to prison for stealing from Catherine. Unable to reach her mother, Helena now faces a grim life behind bars. Jenny returns from a vacation to Mexico, more cold and deranged than ever, with an eccentric hedge fund billionaire financier, named William Halsey (Wallace Shawn), to help her launch a creative takeover of Lez Girls from Tina's studio. Also, Phyllis has second thoughts about getting tied down to Joyce during a "coming out" party that Kit throws for them at the Planet. Paige discovers Shane's infidelity and ends their relationship.
| 53 | 2 | "Look Out, Here They Come!" | Jamie Babbit | Cherien Dabis | January 13, 2008 |
Tina's obvious, lingering affection for Bette affects her dating prospects. Jenny lands Shane a last-minute job of styling hair at the wedding of William Halsey's daughter which results in a series of erotic encounters as Shane seduces two of the bridesmaids... and the mother of the bride as well. Meanwhile, Tasha returns and reveals to Alice that she's being investigated by the U.S. Army for "homosexual conduct". Elsewhere, Kit and Max meet a young woman named Adele (Malaya Drew), who's obsessed with Jenny's work and hook her up with her dream job of being Jenny's new personal assistant. In prison, Helena is rescued by her cell mate, Dusty, from a severe beating from the other inmates which seems to draw them closer together. Also, Phyllis tells Joyce that she's having doubts about where they stand on their romance, while Bette and Jodi's romance grows stronger.
| 54 | 3 | "Lady of the Lake" | Tricia Brock | Ilene Chaiken | January 20, 2008 |
Shane, still upset over her breakup with Paige, decides to temporarily swear off sex and reap the health benefits of new energy and focus by taking exercise classes and having Jenny, Alice, Tina, and others tag along with her. Bette goes away for the weekend with Jodi to a mountain cabin upstate where Bette soon becomes uncomfortable with Jodi's brash artist friends. Tasha meets with a military lawyer, named Captain Curtis Beech (Ted Whittall), for help in her upcoming "homosexual conduct" case. Jenny tries to adjust herself with her new assistant, Adele, who seems to enjoy Jenny's demanding and difficult requests. As Helena slowly gets comfortable with prison life, things suddenly change when her angry mother, Peggy, finally turns up to post her bail. But although being free, Helena learns that she's not free from her mother's grasp and skips town.
| 55 | 4 | "Let's Get This Party Started" | John Stockwell | Elizabeth Ziff | January 27, 2008 |
Jenny takes over casting for Lez Girls and while quarreling with Tina and the production company over the process is lobbied for the lead role by an up-and-coming actress named Niki Stevens (Kate French). Alice receives an unwelcome visit at home from two military officers investigating Tasha's case. Two new characters are introduced, a lesbian couple named Dawn Denbo (Elizabeth Keener) and her lover Cindi (Alicia Leigh Willis), who open up a new lesbian club, called SheBar, down the street from the Planet which could spell trouble for Kit while the gang attends the grand opening of SheBar, and the owners show an interest in Shane. Alice skips out on the grand opening of SheBar when she gets invited to an underground Hollywood party with Tasha where she sees a few celebrities she knows.
| 56 | 5 | "Lookin' at You, Kid" | Angela Robinson | Angela Robinson | February 3, 2008 |
Jenny throws a party at her house which introduces her friends to the actresses playing them in Lez Girls, provoking both delight and distress as everyone meets Niki (playing Jenny's character 'Jesse'), Begoña (playing Marina's character 'Karina'), Isabella (playing Bette's character 'Bev'), Greg (playing Tim's character 'Jim'), Lauren (playing Helena's character 'Helen'), Marci (playing Dana's character 'Donna'), Susan (playing Alice's character 'Alysse'), Gretchen (playing Tina's character 'Nina'), Cheryl (playing Kit's character 'Cat') and Cammie (playing Shane's character 'Shaun'). Bette and Tina try to deal with what is obviously a rekindled spark in their romance and try to keep it from Jodi. Max confides in Jenny that he suspects Adele is not who she claims after catching her in a lie about her past. But Jenny, fully consumed by her ego and megalomania, refuses to even listen to Max and claims that he is the one who has a problem with Adele. Meanwhile, Alice angrily outs a closeted gay basketball star after he utters a homophobic slur, which sparks a media firestorm and increases the rift between her and Tasha. Shane stirs up more drama between Dawn and Cindi when she falls off the sex wagon and sleeps with Cindi, which escalates into bitter rivalry between The Planet and SheBar.
| 57 | 6 | "Lights! Camera! Action!" | Ilene Chaiken | Ilene Chaiken | February 10, 2008 |
Production on Lez Girls finally begins with Jenny, having fully taken over as the director, co-executive producer, and screenwriter, deals with the headaches of filmmaking, as well as directing Niki and dealing with her newfound dynamic of having a relationship with the lead. Adele scouts Vancouver for location scenes while Jenny treats her to a full makeover and shopping spree. Back in Los Angeles, Bette and Tina struggle with their rekindled romance. The twisted Dawn and Cindi take their war against the gang to the next level in another strategy to close down The Planet when rats are discovered on the Planet's grounds, resulting in the health board shutting it down. Elsewhere, Tasha gets her things from Alice's place, while Phyllis deals more with her divorce and her daughter Molly's (Clementine Ford) resentment towards her.
| 58 | 7 | "Lesbians Gone Wild" | Angela Robinson | Elizabeth Ziff | February 17, 2008 |
The manic and nasty-minded Jenny grows more desperate and crazy over directing as well as motivating the difficult Niki, who begins slacking off. But the crafty Adele convinces the frustrated and bored Niki to take off and she ends up in an arena ring of a female oil-wrestling match at SheBar, while Jenny tracks Niki down there and also lands in the ring. Meanwhile, trouble for Tasha increases when tough-minded, by-the-book military officer, Colonel Gillian Davis (Kelly McGillis), arrives to prosecute her for homosexual conduct. Alice, now co-hosting a new TV talk show, makes matters worse for both Tasha as well as Niki with her inability to stay quiet about their lives. Bette is stuck looking after Phyllis' uptight daughter, Molly, who in turn has a few harsh and friendly words with Shane who's now working on hairstyling for Lez Girls.
| 59 | 8 | "Lay Down the Law" | Leslie Libman | Alexandra Kondracke | February 24, 2008 |
Tasha's military trial begins where Alice finds herself in a serious bind when she's called by Colonel Davis to testify on behalf of the U.S. Army against Tasha. Alice must decide whether to tell the truth about her romance with Tasha, or lie and risk facing charges of perjury. Meanwhile, Jenny continues her romance with Niki just as Niki's managers push into damage control after photos of Niki's oil wrestling stint are posted on every tabloid magazine and Internet site. When one of Niki's movies opens, Tina and the producers ban Jenny from attending as Niki's date, and force a (male) actor to accompany Niki to the premier. Jenny asks Adele to sneak her into the theater, but the crafty Adele instead locks Jenny out, and even impersonates Jenny to some of the attendees. Across town, Bette and Tina's anguish over hiding their secret tryst begins to emotionally get to both of them as Jodi continue to slowly drift away from Bette, while Tina invites the Lez Girls cinematographer over for dinner at Jodi's house. Elsewhere, Molly continues to resent Phyllis' action concerning her divorce, and Shane tries to get Molly to see her mother in a more positive light.
| 60 | 9 | "Liquid Heat" | Rose Troche | Ilene Chaiken | March 2, 2008 |
When a massive heat wave hits Los Angeles, Kit and the owners of SheBar, Dawn and Cindi, arrange a "Mafia-type sitdown" of talks with the whole gang to try to end their ugly conflict over business and "lesbo rights". Unfortunately, Dawn's self-serving and nearly impossible demands to Kit, Jenny, Alice, Shane and everyone else almost derail the negotiations, until Bette steps in and manages to negotiate a hesitant, but short lived, truce. Meanwhile, Shane has an "encounter" with Molly who continues to maintain that she is straight and not interested in Shane. But Molly later invites Shane to her house where another "encounter" happens, and her mother, Phyllis, walks in on them. Elsewhere, Jenny fires the "prissy" male actor, Greg, from the set after he makes a move onto Niki. Bette continues to drift apart from Jodi who begins to wonder why Bette has a lack of interest in her. Later, Bette and Tina get stuck in an elevator during a city-wide power outage while on their way to meet with their therapist, Dan, about their problems. As Tasha tries to get on with life out of the Army, Max and Jodi's sign-language translator, Tom, have a date, and Adele continues to cause problems between Jenny and Niki.
| 61 | 10 | "Lifecycle" | Angela Robinson | Angela Robinson | March 9, 2008 |
The girls all enroll themselves in the Subaru Pink Ride bicycle marathon as part of a breast cancer fund raiser as Team Dana. Tasha sees some of her old friends, and appears to be having a bit of a hard time balancing her desire to spend time with Alice with her desire to reconnect with her buddies. Tasha asks Alice to move in together, and Alice accepts. During their stop for the night, a campfire game of 'I never' evolves into an involved discussion of cheating where Bette and Tina end up unintentionally revealing their secret newfound romance to their appalled friends, leaving Jodi completely wrecked. Meanwhile, Molly's continuing interest in Shane leads her to follow her on the bicycle marathon, apologizing for the blunt conversation Shane overheard between Molly and Phyllis. Molly succeeds in getting back into Shane's good graces, and they hook up. Jenny brings Niki along with her to get away from work, and they unwind by making an explicit homemade video of some of their time alone. However, Adele secretly takes the tape that they made.
| 62 | 11 | "Lunar Cycle" | Bob Aschmann | Ilene Chaiken | March 16, 2008 |
Adele finally reveals her true colors when she shows the videotape that she stole of Jenny and Niki making love during the Subaru Pink Ride and threatens to send copies of it to every TV network unless Jenny is fired and Adele is put in as Jenny's replacement. Desperate to protect Niki's private life, the studio heads comply with Adel's demands and Jenny is ousted from the picture. Jenny tries to lead a walk-off the set to protest, but other than Shane, no one joins her. Jenny is incensed at Adele's betrayal. When Dawn and Cindi buy Ivan's 51% of the rights of The Planet in another attempt to close it down for good, Kit reaches her breaking point and goes to She-Bar to "do something stupid" with her newly bought gun, but is interrupted by Bette who asks her to pick up Angie from pre-school. After a terrifying moment when Angie finds and plays with the still-loaded gun, Kit disposes of the gun in a trash can. Meanwhile, Bette and Jodi get together to talk about Bette's infidelity, but nothing becomes stated because Bette confirms to love simultaneously Tina and Jodi. Tina, with problems of her own on the Jenny-Adele case, constantly calls Bette to check if she has broken up with Jodi. Tasha and Alice look for a place to move in, but troubles arise when they talk about expenses, and the details of splitting the rent. Alice is invited to a party by a New Zealand lesbian fashion designer, named Clea Mason (guest star Melanie Lynskey), whom she met on the TV cable program The Look. Elsewhere, Shane and Molly finally go on a date and consummate their growing attraction to each other.
| 63 | 12 | "Loyal and True" | Ilene Chaiken | Ilene Chaiken | March 23, 2008 |
In the season final, Shane and Molly talk about their romantic night together the next morning before meeting Molly's mother, Phyllis, and Joyce for breakfast. Phyllis asks Molly if she is taking the internship during the summer that they once talked about, Molly replies that she will spend the summer surfing with Shane, who was unaware of the internship. Shane is later confronted by Phyllis who says that Shane is not worthy of being with Molly and must break up with her. Helena Peabody returns to Los Angeles to visit her dying mother in the hospital and is gifted by her family's wealth once again. After hearing of Kit's loss of The Planet while she was away, Helena brings a mighty tempting proposition to SheBar co-owner Cindi: the chance of escaping Dawn's claws by selling the ownership documents of the bar, which Cindi gladly accepts. Meanwhile, Alice almost kisses Clea Mason, but doesn't end up falling in temptation despite her continuing problems with Tasha. Elsewhere, Bette gives a speech supporting Jodi at her new art exhibition, but later the vindictive Jodi attacks Bette by humiliating her in front of everyone. Filming on Lez Girls finally wraps up as everyone arrives in all the glitz and glamor to the film's celebration wrap party, where Bette reunites with Tina at last. The sociopath Adele tries to ban Jenny from attending and continues to pass off the work as her own while basking in her ill-gotten Hollywood fame and glory. But Jenny, with Tina's help, sneaks into the party and sets the record straight by giving a powerful speech demolishing Adele's character, but also says how thankful she is for the rest of her friends' loyalty and trust, ironically in that same moment, Shane betrays Jenny by seducing Nikki where Jenny walks in on them. Looking towards Shane, Jenny angrily tells Shane that she just broke her heart.

== Production ==
Showtime picked up a fifth season of The L Word for 12 episodes, touting the show as "a signature franchise among our viewers". Production began in Vancouver the summer of 2007 and ended in Los Angeles early November 2007.
