= The L Word season 3 =

The L Word
- Season 3
- No. of episodes: 12

Release
- Original network: Showtime
- Original release: January 8 – March 26, 2006

Season chronology
- ← Previous; Season 2 Next → Season 4

The third season of The L Word originally aired on Showtime from January 8, 2006 to March 26, 2006 and aired 12 episodes. The season begins six months after the birth of Tina and Bette's daughter, Angelica. New characters in this season include Moira Sweeney (a working class butch portrayed by Daniel Sea who is Jenny's girlfriend for most of the season) and Angus Partridge (portrayed by Dallas Roberts), Angelica's male nanny who later becomes Kit's lover. Sweeney starts the process of transitioning switching his name to Max. Erin Daniels' character, Dana Fairbanks, starts in a multi-episode storyline dealing with a breast cancer battle and culminating with her death. Notable of this season is that each episode begins with a short pre-credits vignette of two individuals meeting romantically or sexually. As the season progresses, lines from Alice's chart (see here) connect one member of each vignette with a new individual in the next. Helena's character storyline was switched from being Bette's rival into a new member of the circle of friends. Her story arc for the season involves the acquisition of a movie studio in which Tina later works and which further derives a sexual harassment lawsuit that triggers her mother to cut her off financially in the season finale. Sarah Shahi's character, Carmen de la Pica Morales, ends her appearance in the show in the finale when Shane leaves her at the altar.

== Cast and characters ==
Actor/Actress	Character
Mia Kirshner	Jenny Schecter
Jennifer Beals	Bette Porter
Laurel Holloman	Tina Kennard
Leisha Hailey	Alice Pieszecki
Katherine Moennig	Shane McCutcheon
Pam Grier	Kit Porter
Erin Daniels	Dana Fairbanks

== Production ==
The producers of the series set up a contest at the website FanLib.com where fans could submit a femme slash fanfic. The winner's story was incorporated into a scene of a third-season episode.

== Episodes ==
No. overall	No. in season	Title	Directed by	Written by	Original release date
28	1	"Labia Majora"	Rose Troche	Ilene Chaiken	January 8, 2006
Six months later. Bette and Tina, now back together, try to deal with parenting their baby daughter, Angelica, while trying to handle a disagreeable social worker who disapproves of their unorthodox parenting methods. Alice, now hosting her own radio show 'The Chart' in Santa Monica, cannot get over her breakup with Dana; it turns out that Dana's talk with Lara resulted in them sleeping together and deciding to renew their relationship, which led to Dana leaving Alice. Helena decides to go into the movie business by purchasing a small and struggling studio. With Mark having moved out of the house, Carmen has moved in and her romantic relationship with Shane gets a little more serious when Carmen wants to take Shane to meet her parents and Shane agrees to act straight. Kit goes to her son, David, over a medical condition of hers. Jenny, recovering at her parents house in Illinois from her nervous breakdown, decides that she has had enough with Midwest life and ponders moving back to Los Angeles with her new butch girlfriend, Moira (Daniel Sea).
29	2	"Lost Weekend"	Bille Eltringham	A. M. Homes	January 15, 2006
Kit hires Billie Blaikie (Alan Cumming), a transvestite party promoter, to get the business up at The Planet. Jenny wonders where she stands with Moira as they take an eventful road trip back to California. Carmen's overbearing mother attempts to turn Shane into a more feminine person. Following their social worker Mrs. Collie's advice, Bette and Tina try to find a male role model for Angelica leading them to hire Angus Partridge (Dallas Roberts), a struggling musician, to help. Helena tries to help Alice get over her obsession with Dana. Dana deals with health problems after Lara feels a lump in her breast during a session of their lovemaking.
30	3	"Lobsters"	Bronwen Hughes	Ilene Chaiken	January 22, 2006
Shane gets another hairstyling job at a skate shop called WAX. Control freak Bette loses her position as the sole provider for the family, forcing Tina to take a job at the studio under Helena. Jenny and Moira finally arrive back in Los Angeles where Jenny introduces Moira to her surprised friends. Meanwhile, Dana and Lara make plans to visit France while Alice still obsesses over Dana leading to friction with her radio show job. Kit is surprised by Billie Blaikie who wants to make some drastic changes to the Planet in favor of the local gay crowd. Elsewhere, Angus begins to develop an attraction to Kit.
31	4	"Light My Fire"	Lynne Stopkewich	Cherien Dabis	January 29, 2006
Tina and Helena attend a documentary screening of up-and-coming film maker Dylan Moreland (Alexandra Hedison). Bette travels to Washington D.C. to speak at a Senate hearing about increased funding for left-wing artwork and afterward, she meets with Senator Barbara Grisham (Dana Delany). Jenny puts her dreams of becoming a writer on hold and starts working as a waitress at The Planet. Jenny and Moira are invited to a party hosted by Billie Blaikie where Moira meets like-minded people. Carmen has to decide whether to give up Shane's opening party at WAX in exchange for a once-in-a-lifetime opportunity to DJ at an exclusive VIP party that Russell Simmons is throwing. Alice has an emotional meltdown on-the-air during her radio show. Also, Dana plays at a tennis tournament and declares her love for Lara in front of TV cameras.
32	5	"Lifeline"	Kimberly Peirce	Ilene Chaiken	February 5, 2006
Tina finds herself attracted to men once again by going onto Internet sex chat rooms. Bette discovers Tina's Internet sex-chat messages. Bette explores Buddhism and also hears good news on the work front. Both Alice and Kit try out the Planet's Bisexual Speed-Dating hosted by Billie: Kit with Angelica's male nanny Angus and Alice with a lesbian vampire named Uta. Meanwhile, Dana receives devastating news that she has breast cancer which calls for surgery. Helena pursues the documentary film maker Dylan Moreland despite her claims that she's straight. Moira comes out as a trans man, and changes his name to Max. Shane's ex-lover, Cherie Jaffe, now divorced and out-of-the-closet, drops by WAX to see her to talk about her new life which causes instant anger and jealousy in Carmen.
33	6	"Lifesize"	Tricia Brock	Adam Rapp	February 12, 2006
Jenny meets with a publisher about her manuscript for a book, while Billie makes Moira a tempting, but shady offer to give her testosterone drugs. Kit gives in to Angus' advances. An angry Carmen lays down the law to Shane regarding their relationship over Shane's one-night fling with Cherie. Helena comes face-to-face with Dylan over where they stand where Dylan wants to continue their romance. Dana checks herself into the hospital for surgery while Lara contacts Dana's parents to update them on Dana's condition. A new and improved Alice offers her support to Lara who confides in her about Dana's condition.
34	7	"Lone Star"	Frank Pierson	Elizabeth Ziff	February 19, 2006
Tina takes a business trip to Vancouver to a movie shoot location and has a chance to explore her feelings for the opposite sex with her producer Josh. Back in Los Angeles, Dana's cancer treatments put a strain on her and Lara's relationship. Helena continues her secret romance with Dylan. Jenny helps Max in his gender transition. Later, Jenny travels to New York City to meet with an editor over her book being published. Meanwhile, Carmen and Shane decide to get matching tattoos out of their renewed love. Alice reverts to her old self in her obsession over Dana. Kit finally takes control over the situation at the Planet by firing the self-destructive Billie, while she continues her romance with Angus.
35	8	"Latecomer"	Angela Robinson	Ilene Chaiken	February 26, 2006
Jenny plans a charity event at WAX to support Max when they find out he can't pay for a mastectomy. Helena takes the girls to a surprise trip to San Jose to an all-star basketball game and to honor Dana in her expectant recovery. Carmen is still dealing with the aftermath of her meeting with Shane's ex. Bette kicks Tina out of the bedroom and tries to find peace in Buddhism. In a recording studio, Kit gets help from unexpected sources for her music career.
36	9	"Lead, Follow or Get Out of the Way"	Moises Kaufman	Ilene Chaiken	March 5, 2006
Bette has hard time adjusting to the ascetic lifestyle at the Buddhist retreat in snowy upstate Washington. Back in Los Angeles, Tina goes on a date with a divorced man named Henry (Steven Eckholdt). Dana begins looking forward to a new career after meeting Dr. Susan Love over her possible recovery. Jenny throws a benefit party for Max at the WAX, but she gets appalled by his increasingly aggressive behavior. Carmen finally tells the truth to her family about her lesbianism and Shane being her lover. Helena's affair with Dylan takes a surprising turn when she is served with a lawsuit by Dylan for sexual harassment.
37	10	"Losing the Light"	Rose Troche	Rose Troche	March 12, 2006
(Told in real time) With Lara still in Paris, oblivious to Dana's worsening health, Alice maintains a bedside vigil for Dana at the hospital in Los Angeles. Across town, Jenny introduces Max to her former boyfriend, Tim, who has re-married and who still harbors a grudge against Jenny. Carmen evens the score with Shane by telling her that she too was unfaithful. Meanwhile, Peggy Peabody arrives back in town to help Helena with the lawsuit served by the double-crossing Dylan and her scheming partner Danny. Also, Tina has a lunch date with Henry and his friends. Kit becomes impatient with Angus when he's late for their afternoon date. In upstate Washington, a frustrated Bette leaves the Buddhist retreat, but receives a dose of life wisdom from an unexpected source at a bus stop. Dana passes away at the end of the episode and Alice is overcome with grief, as she arrived back to Dana's room minutes after she dies.
38	11	"Last Dance"	Allison Anders	Ilene Chaiken	March 19, 2006
At Dana's funeral and memorial services, her uptight and fiercely conservative parents, still in denial to her true sexual orientation, treat her friends very coldly by forcibly sequestering them and forbidding them from publicly talking about Dana's personal life to anyone in attendance. Afterwards, Alice gets determined to arrange a private special event with the girls to commemorate their friend by stealing some of Dana's ashes and scattering them at a special location at a snow-covered summer camp that Dana once told her about. Meanwhile, Helena's lawsuit with Dylan is resolved with a surprising outcome. Bette hires the feminist lawyer Joyce Wischnia to fight for sole custody of baby Angelica. Elsewhere, Max lands a job at a computer company, the same one where he as 'Moira' got turned down, which gives Jenny something to write about. Dealing with her own grief, Shane is willing to make the ultimate commitment to Carmen by proposing marriage. Lara finally arrives from Paris and is comforted by Alice after learning of Dana's passing.
39	12	"Left Hand of the Goddess"	Ilene Chaiken	Ilene Chaiken	March 26, 2006
Six weeks after Dana's death, Helena takes over planning Shane and Carmen's upcoming wedding to be held at the Whistler Ski Resort in British Columbia, Canada. Shane travels to Portland, Oregon where she has a reunion with her long-estranged father, Gabriel, who has remarried. Helena pitches in when she has Carmen's family flown in for the wedding celebration while Peggy Peabody also arrives to reconnect with her daughter. Jenny and Max continue to drift apart due to their differences, leading Jenny to meet and have a fling with a French-Canadian writer, named Claude. Kit has stunning news about her newfound romance with Angus. Bette continues to become uncomfortable with Tina dating Henry; she also begins having second thoughts about suing Tina for sole custody of baby Angelica. After talking to her father, Shane leaves Carmen at the altar, leaving her crushed. Alice decides to stop drowning her grief with anti-depressant pills and sex.
