= The L Word season 1 =

Season of American/Canadian television series

The L Word
- Season 1
- No. of episodes: 14

Release
- Original network: Showtime
- Original release: January 18 – April 11, 2004

Season chronology
- Next → Season 2

The first season of American/Canadian co-produced drama television series The L Word premiered on Showtime on January 18, 2004 and ended on April 11, 2004, created by Ilene Chaiken, Michele Abbott and Kathy Greenberg. The series portrayed the lives of a group of lesbians and their friends, connections, family and lovers in the trendy Greater Los Angeles, California city of West Hollywood. The series was highly popular and was Showtime's highest rated series. It was renewed for a second and third season.

== Cast and characters ==
Actor/Actress	Character
Mia Kirshner	Jenny Schecter
Jennifer Beals	Bette Porter
Laurel Holloman	Tina Kennard
Leisha Hailey	Alice Pieszecki
Katherine Moennig	Shane McCutcheon
Pam Grier	Kit Porter
Erin Daniels	Dana Fairbanks
Karina Lombard	Marina Ferrer
Eric Mabius	Tim Haspell

== Episodes ==
No. overall	No. in series	Title	Directed by	Written by	Original release date
1 2	1 2	"Pilot"	Rose Troche	Story by : Ilene Chaiken and Kathy Greenberg & Michele Abbott; Teleplay by : Ilene Chaiken	January 18, 2004
Jenny Schecter (Mia Kirshner) is a young writer who graduates from college in Iowa and moves in with her boyfriend, Tim Haspel (Eric Mabius), a university women's swim team coach, in Los Angeles. Her new neighbors, Bette Porter (Jennifer Beals) and Tina Kennard (Laurel Holloman), a couple for seven years now, have a hard time finding a male willing to donate his sperm to fulfill their wish for a child. Tina introduces Jenny to her circle of friends: Dana Fairbanks (Erin Daniels), a prim, proper and closeted tennis player, the witty and ambitious bisexual journalist Alice Pieszecki (Leisha Hailey) and the androgynous, sexually aggressive hairstylist Shane McCutcheon (Katherine Moennig). Jenny also meets Marina Ferrer (Karina Lombard), European owner of The Planet coffeehouse, who is immediately drawn to Jenny and eventually kisses her in the bathroom. Bette and Tina have their own problems and discuss using an African American as a donor for their child, which Tina will carry. Bette also deals with her alcoholic older half-sister Kit (Pam Grier), who has problems with her singing career, the only straight female character of the main cast. Jenny soon betrays Tim by sleeping with Marina. The next morning, Jenny finds a ring from Tim on her breakfast table.
3	3	"Let's Do It"	Rose Troche	Susan Miller	January 25, 2004
Dana is asked to star in an ad campaign, but is worried about her sexual orientation being made public. While doing research for a story, Alice meets her old girlfriend Gabby (guest star Guinevere Turner) and is immediately drawn to her again. Shane is harassed by an old girlfriend, Lacey (guest star Tammy Lynn Michaels), who thinks Shane used her. Bette and Tina try artificial insemination with the sperm of Marcus Allenwood. The girls help Dana calibrate her "gaydar" and check out her new love interest, a country club sous chef named Lara Perkins (Lauren Lee Smith). Kit tries to mend her relationship with Bette and to rebuild her entertainment career. Tim, unaware of Jenny's encounter with Marina, invites Marina over for dinner, along with Bette and Tina and their other friends. Bette correctly guesses that something happened between Jenny and Marina and asks Marina to leave Jenny alone lest she destroy her relationship with Tim, but Marina takes no notice.
4	4	"Longing"	Lynne Stopkewich	Angela Robinson	February 1, 2004
Bette works on booking an art collection for her museum, the California Art Center, while her boss, Franklin (Michael Tomlinson), works against her. Mistaken for someone else, Bette meets with the influential Peggy Peabody (Holland Taylor) at a hotel in Santa Barbara. Meanwhile, Shane tries to convince her ex, Lacey, to stop the rampage against her. Alice learns that Gabby is still untrustworthy and breaks up with her again. She continues to try to write but suffers from writer's block. Dana finally musters the courage to ask Lara out on a date. Also, Jenny cannot resist temptation and begins an affair with Marina behind Tim's back.
5	5	"Lies, Lies, Lies"	Clement Virgo	Josh Senter	February 8, 2004
Jenny's old college professor Nick (guest star Julian Sands) (with whom she had a fling and whose opinion she values) shows up and tries to convince her that she is more complex than her latest work makes her out to be. Tim begins to suspect Jenny's infidelity, as does Alice and others. However, Jenny outright lies to everyone by denying being unfaithful. Alice later discovers the truth when she walks in on Jenny engaging in sexual acts with Marina in her office at The Planet while Tim is looking for her and Alice covers for Jenny to prevent Tim from finding out and hurting his feelings. Unfortunately, this close call only makes Jenny even more reckless and unapologetic to her cheating with Marina. Meanwhile, Peggy Peabody prevents Bette from getting fired by storming into a meeting and announcing that she will lend the Provocations collection to the museum. Tina finally gets pregnant. Dana is ashamed about what happened on her first date with Lara. Elsewhere, Alice deals with her vain and self-indulgent actress mother, Lenore (guest star Anne Archer), who moves into her apartment after being evicted from her hotel suite. But Alice soon discovers that Lenore is not playing in high profile movies as she claims to be.
6	6	"Lawfully"	Dan Minahan	Rose Troche	February 15, 2004
Tim finally finds out about Jenny and Marina when he walks in on them. In a desperate attempt to hold on to him, Jenny tries making up with Tim; he tells her to prove her love by traveling to Lake Tahoe and marrying him immediately. Meanwhile, Dana is invited to a Subaru dinner party to sponsor her tennis career. She ends up hurting Lara when she takes Harrison, her (male) doubles tennis partner as a cover date. Bette and Tina have dinner with Bette's conservative father (Ossie Davis) where they announce Tina's pregnancy. Shane runs into an old friend, Clive, who is the personal assistant to Harry Sandchuk, a Hollywood bigwig who has come to see Shane's hairstyling work. Alice finally tells her irresponsible mother to move out of her apartment.
7	7	"Losing It"	Clement Virgo	Guinevere Turner	February 22, 2004
A rising artist in New York tests Bette's commitment while Tina has an unpleasant run-in with Lei Ling, the sperm donor's girlfriend, who begins to harass her. Alice meets a man named Lisa, who claims to be a "lesbian in a man's body." Tim, still mistrustful of Jenny after their quickie wedding, returns home alone, leaving Jenny on her own. While hitchhiking back to Los Angeles, Jenny gets a ride from two disaffected teenagers in whom she confides about her troubled life. Also, Shane is excited that Harry wants to refer celebrity clients to her for hairstyling.
8	8	"L'Ennui"	Tony Goldwyn	Ilene Chaiken	February 29, 2004
Jenny is hurt when Tim rejects her and rudely tells her to move out. Jenny then tries to live with Marina, who eventually tells Jenny that she has another lover living in Italy. Bette and Tina struggle with their fears of parenthood. Meanwhile, Dana's fears about being outed by her endorsement contract with Subaru destroy her relationship with Lara. Shane throws a party aboard Harry's boat with all her friends in attendance. Alice, fed up with women, tries a relationship with Lisa, which does not turn out as expected. Kit is stung when her estranged son, David Waters, doesn't show up for their meeting because he thinks she's fallen off the wagon again.
9	9	"Listen Up"	Kari Skogland	Mark Zakarin	March 7, 2004
Jenny tries to explain her situation and her confused sexuality to her one-time college roommate, Annette, who suggests they stalk Marina's girlfriend, Francesca (guest star Lolita Davidovich), after she arrives in town. Bette and Tina attend group therapy in preparation for becoming parents, while Bette faces off against a black militant writer, Yolanda, who questions Bette's self-image as a mixed-race person. With her Subaru endorsement contract in full swing, Dana, with Alice in tow, decides to come out to her right-wing parents during a formal ball for Mrs. Fairbanks, despite knowing they will not approve. Kit is asked to help write a song for rapper Slim Daddy (guest star Snoop Dogg). Shane throws Clive out of her place after catching him stealing from her to support his drug habit.
10	10	"Luck, Next Time"	Rose Troche	Rose Troche	March 14, 2004
Bette faces serious personal and professional problems when the art gallery comes under attack for a radical exhibit and Tina buys expensive baby accessories without consulting her. As Dana starts to adjust to being out of the closet, fame (with complications) finds Shane when she gives a has-been actress, Cherie Jaffe (Rosanna Arquette), a new style and the married actress makes a pass at her. Alice finds complications with Lisa and turns to another man named Andrew. Jenny has an unpleasant dinner with Marina and Francesca, who defend their open romance; Jenny leaves even more confused about whether she wants to be with Marina or with Tim. Later, Tim tells Jenny that he cannot forgive her for her infidelity and deception. Also, Kit begins to rehearse for Slim Daddy's music video.
11	11	"Liberally"	Mary Harron	Ilene Chaiken	March 21, 2004
Tina's grief from her sudden miscarriage is eased when an unexpected opportunity arrives; a member of her and Bette's therapy group asks her to volunteer at a social insurance office. There, she and her colleagues find some dirt on Fae Buckley (guest star Helen Shaver), the fanatical leader of a religious group that's hell-bent on shutting down Bette's art gallery. Meanwhile, Shane's relationship with Cherie becomes complicated when Cherie's unsuspecting husband, Steve, wants to help Shane open up her own hair salon and asks her to spend time with his emotionally distant daughter, Clea, who also makes a pass at Shane. Marina and Francesca have an argument over Francesca wanting to leave town again for a job back in Italy. Jenny tries to help the distraught Tim, who begins to date Trish, one of his swim team students. Dana gets a new hairstyle and attempts to have a fling with Jenny. Alice worries that she might be pregnant after her trysts with Lisa and Andrew. Also, Kit makes her return to the stage during a club party with Slim Daddy.
12	12	"Looking Back"	Rose Troche	Guinevere Turner	March 28, 2004
Bette prepares for the gallery's "Provocations" show and hires Candace, an attractive female contractor, to handle the set-up. Meanwhile, Tina, Jenny, Shane, Alice and Dana share an eventful road trip to Palm Springs to the Dinah Shore Golf Classic for women. They each tell their coming out stories. At the hotel, Dana hits it off with a pushy event-planner named Tonya (Meredith McGeachie) and Jenny unloads about her tragic life to some of the attendees, including a new, much older potential lover named Robin (Anne Ramsay).
13	13	"Locked Up"	Lynne Stopkewich	Ilene Chaiken	April 4, 2004
A near-riot at the art gallery lands Bette, Dana, Shane and Alice in the L.A. County Jail, which puts Bette in dangerous proximity to Candace when they share a cell together. Meanwhile, Kit meets Ivan (Kelly Lynch), a very masculine auto mechanic whom she is strangely attracted to. Marina contemplates life without Francesca and begins to flirt with Robin, knowing that Robin has planned a date with Jenny. Jenny tries to write a story about manatees and attends the local aquarium for inspiration. There, she meets an attractive marine biologist named Gene and asks him out. As Tim and Jenny discuss divorce, Shane's relationships spin out of control when Clea refuses to take no for an answer.
14	14	"Limb from Limb"	Tony Goldwyn	Ilene Chaiken	April 11, 2004
The "Provocations" art show finally premieres at the CAC to mixed reviews and Bette commits adultery with Candace. Marina continues to flirt with Robin despite knowing she's dating Jenny, who has also begun sleeping with Gene. Shane's life turns from bad to worse when her attempt to let Clea down gently turns disastrous. Next, Cherie abandons Shane when their tryst is discovered and Steve terminates his business arrangement with Shane. Dana's pet cat dies and Tonya proposes marriage. At the end of the episode, Tina finds out about Candace's affair with Bette, who apologizes, before a sexual encounter turns aggressive. Alice realizes that she is in love with Dana and goes to her apartment to tell her. They kiss, but Alice returns home alone, where she finds Tina sitting on her couch, crying.

== Reception ==
=== Ratings ===
The L Word rated as Showtime's highest new show for the 2003-2004 U.S. television season. However, the series was facing competition with CBS' own shows, NCIS and CSI: Miami.

=== Critic reviews ===
The show's first season was "broadcast to critical acclaim and instant popularity"; as an article from The New York Times pointed out:

Before "The L Word," lesbian characters barely existed in television. Interested viewers had to search and second-guess, playing parlor games to suss out a character's sexuality. Cagney and Lacey? Jo on "Facts of Life"? Xena and Gabrielle? Showtime's decision in January 2004 to air The L Word, which follows the lives of a group of fashionable Los Angeles lesbians, was akin to ending a drought with a monsoon. Women who had rarely seen themselves on the small screen were suddenly able to watch lesbian characters not only living complex, exciting lives, but also making love in restaurant bathrooms and in swimming pools. There was no tentative audience courtship. Instead, there was sex, raw and unbridled in that my-goodness way that only cable allows.
