= One More Saturday Night (film) =

1986 film by Dennis Klein

- Theatrical release poster
- Directed by: Dennis Klein
- Written by: Al Franken; Tom Davis
- Produced by: Jonathan Bernstein; Robert Kosberg; Tova Laiter
- Starring: Tom Davis; Al Franken; Moira Harris; Frank Howard; Bess Meyer; Meshach Taylor
- Cinematography: James Glennon
- Edited by: Gregory Prange
- Music by: David McHugh
- Distributed by: Columbia Pictures
- Release date: August 22, 1986
- Running time: 95 minutes
- Country: United States
- Language: English
- Box office: $32,279 (USA)

One More Saturday Night is a 1986 American comedy film written by Al Franken and Tom Davis and directed by Dennis Klein.

== Plot ==
On a Saturday night in St. Cloud, Minnesota, Russ Cadwell is ready to have sex with his girlfriend, Diane Lundahl. Doug, a petty thief, decides to become a burglar, and his friend Traci suggests they burglarize a nearby house. Mr. Lundahl, father of Diane, Karen, and Kevin, goes on a date with a woman named Peggy. They have sex in a car at the park.

Karen is babysitting for Bill and Lynn Neal as they go out to eat. Karen's boyfriend comes over to the house and talks her into having a party there. Russ gets into an argument with Diane. She and her friend, Tobi, go to the local bar, drink, and watch Bad Mouth, the band playing there. The lead band members, Larry Hays and Paul Flum, are both hoping to score. Things get crazier but also better as time goes by.

== Cast ==
- Al Franken as Paul Flum
- Tom Davis as Larry Hays
- Moira Harris as Peggy
- Frank Howard as Eddie
- Bess Meyer as Tobi
- David Reynolds as Russ Cadwell
- Chelcie Ross as Mr. Lundahl
- Nan Woods as Diane Lundahl
- Nina Siemaszko as Karen Lundahl
- Jonathan Singer as Kevin Lundahl
- Eric Saiet as Doug
- Meshach Taylor as Bill Neal
- Dianne B. Shaw as Lynn Neal
- Jessica Schwartz as Traci
- Rondi Reed as Mrs. Becker
- Ann Coyle as Night desk clerk
- Steve Pink as Dogman
- John Cameron Mitchell as Drunk Teen
- Dan "Cujo" Sullivan as Unseen Canoer
- Kevin J. O'Connor as Hood

== Critical reception ==
TV Guide says the film "suffers from trying to explore a variety of situations, and ultimately gets nothing said at all. The situations are routine, lacking wit or originality. Director Dennis Klein's pacing is slack and reveals no flare [sic] for comedy."

== Trivia ==
Franken appeared on the 1985-1986 season finale of Saturday Night Live during Weekend Update and announced that Columbia Pictures was test-marketing the film in Sacramento, California, in June 1986; he also displayed a map depicting the locations of movie theaters showing the film, and provided directions to the nearest theater for viewers in the San Francisco Bay Area.

The movie's title is taken from the Grateful Dead song of the same name. Franken and Davis were big Grateful Dead fans.

== Production ==
Portions of the movie were filmed in Glenview, Illinois, and at the Chateau Louise Resort in West Dundee, Illinois.

== See also ==
- List of American films of 1986
