= David Gerber =

American television producer (1923–2010)

David Gerber (July 25, 1923 – January 2, 2010) was an American television executive producer. Amongst the numerous television films, series, and specials he executive produced is the series Police Story, for which he won the Primetime Emmy Award for Outstanding Drama Series.

== Career ==
Gerber was president of the television division of three major studios: 20th Century Fox Television, from 1965 to 1972, Columbia Pictures Television, from 1974 to 1982 and MGM Television, from 1984 to 1992.

He executive produced for television under his own production company, David Gerber Productions. His first project was the sitcom The Ghost & Mrs. Muir (1968–1970). Over the next few years, he executive produced TV movies, the British children's series Here Come the Double Deckers (1970), the sitcom Nanny and the Professor (1970–1971), and the Western drama Cade's County (1971–1972). In 1973, he started production of the popular and critically acclaimed series Police Story, nominated for four consecutive years for the Primetime Emmy Award for Outstanding Drama Series, winning in 1976.

After 1992, he launched his own production company The Gerber Company. In 1993, he partnered with ITC Entertainment Group to launch a production company, the Gerber-ITC Entertainment Group. In 1995, he went to All-American Television as producer. He quit in 1998 to launch a production company affiliated with Fox Television Studios. In 2003, his contract was reupped.

Other executive producer credits include Jessie, Riker, Eischied, The Lindbergh Kidnapping Case, Nakia, Gibbsville, Hunter, Walking Tall, Quark, Today's FBI, Seven Brides for Seven Brothers, Lady Blue, The Price of Love and Jack & Mike. Gerber was executive producer of the 2006 made-for-TV docudrama, Flight 93.

== Personal life ==
Gerber was born in Brooklyn, New York. He grew up Jewish in a predominantly Italian and Irish neighborhood, early experiences which created an affinity for other cultures. He served in the United States Army Air Forces in World War II, and was held as a prisoner of war in Nazi Germany for over a year after his B-17 bomber was shot down. After the war, he graduated from the University of the Pacific.

He married actress Laraine Stephens in June 1970. Gerber died in Los Angeles from heart failure at the age of 86.

== Awards and accolades ==
Gerber won one Primetime Emmy Awards from seven nominations, including four consecutive nominations for Outstanding Drama Series for the series Police Story, winning in 1976.

He won the Christopher Award for achievement in Television and Cable in 2002, for the television film The Lost Battalion (2001). His final production, the 2006 television film Flight 93, earned him a nomination for the Award for Best Long-Form Television at the 18th Producers Guild of America Awards, in addition to his seventh Emmy nomination, for Outstanding Television Movie at the 58th Primetime Emmy Awards.

Gerber has also been recognized for his body of work. At the 1996 Artios Awards, Gerber received the Casting Society of America's Lifetime Achievement Award. In 2006, he was honored with a star on the Hollywood Walk of Fame.
