= The L Word season 6 =

Season of television series

The L Word
- Season 6
- No. of episodes: 8

Release
- Original network: Showtime
- Original release: January 18 – March 8, 2009

Season chronology
- ← Previous; Season 5

The sixth and final season of The L Word started airing on January 18, 2009 and ended its original run on March 8 of the same year. 8 episodes were produced instead of 12.

== Episodes ==
No. overall	No. in season	Title	Directed by	Written by	Original release date
64	1	"Long Night's Journey Into Day"	Ilene Chaiken	Ilene Chaiken	January 18, 2009
Picking up immediately after where Season 5 left off, Niki tries to deal with her betrayal to Jenny as they both attempt to figure out their feelings for one another. Shane awkwardly tries to apologize to Jenny, who responds by threatening to evict Shane from her house. Jenny further meddles in Shane's life when she has a run-in with Molly, and tells her that Shane is dating someone else. Jenny then invites Niki over back at the house where they have a passionate night of sex, only for Jenny to reject her the next morning for the sole purpose to emotionally hurt Niki. Meanwhile, Bette and Tina get worried when Angelica (Olivia Windbiel) comes down with a fever that gradually gets worse. Alice and Tasha cannot decide whether to break up or stay together since their different views on life strain their romance to the breaking point. Alice and Tasha end up at Papi's apartment seeking relationship advice. Elsewhere, Helena and Kit celebrate after taking over SheBar nightclub and formally rename the place, Hit!
65	2	"Least Likely"	Rose Troche	Rose Troche	January 25, 2009
While Niki is enraged by Jenny's vindictive way of leading her on and dumping her, Bette encounters an old friend from college, named Kelly Wentworth (Elizabeth Berkley), which makes Tina question how much she trusts her partner. The revenge-seeking Jodi continues to frustrate and taunt Bette. Joyce asks Phyllis to marry her, to which she says "yes". Meanwhile, Max receives the surprising news that he is four months pregnant. During counseling, Tasha and Alice rekindle their spark. But the counselor, Dan, gives Alice and Tasha some not-so-good advice, and they wonder whether or not they should stay together. Helena encounters her former flame Dylan Moreland, apparently out of the closet, in the Hit! club, and displays her anger for Dylan's past betrayal. Kit also hires a flamboyant drag queen, named Sunset Boulevard (Roger R. Cross), as the Master of Ceremonies and DJ for Hit!. When Shane gives up on asking for Jenny's forgiveness, Jenny says she's in love with her... and they kiss.
66	3	"LMFAO"	Angela Robinson	Alexandra Kondracke	February 1, 2009
Alice walks in on Jenny and Shane after their night of passion, and naturally does not hesitate to gossip about it to everyone she knows before they have a chance to explain. Meanwhile, Tina gets into trouble when the film negatives for the movie The Girls (which the producers changed from "Lez Girls"), have been stolen from the studio and Tina gets blamed by her boss, Aaron, because she expressed frustration over the movie's ending, which was changed to a straight love story after being deemed too homosexual by the studio bosses. Tina thinks Jenny stole the negatives, but she denies it. But the unseen culprit soon frames Tina for the theft by sending a ransom note e-mail from Tina's office computer. Elsewhere, Joyce and Phyllis give the news about their impending marriage. Bette continues to have problems at work when Jodi continues harassing her. But when Phyllis turns down Bette's request to fire Jodi for insubordination, Bette concedes defeat and decides to quit her job. Also, Alice makes a choice to change her media career after she disobeys her employer's orders and reads a heartfelt letter on-air about a gay bashing incident, and Dylan attempts reuniting with Helena.
67	4	"Leaving Los Angeles"	Rose Troche	Ilene Chaiken	February 8, 2009
Shane and Jenny's relationship continues to go on strong, despite some troubling problems with Jenny's selfish and amoral attitude over starting fresh. Meanwhile, Bette and Tina travel to Nevada to meet with the young woman, Marci, whose unborn child they wish to adopt. Back in Los Angeles, Max tries to cope with being pregnant while Tom tries to make sense of it all after they attend a Lamaze class. Dylan tells Tina that she is in love with Helena. Tasha and Alice attempt to play matchmaker for Helena by setting her up with their newfound gal pal Jamie Chen (Mei Melançon). Helena is not interested in Jamie, but both Alice and Tasha hit it off with Jamie right away. Bette's fidelity is compromised by Kelly Wentworth who offers Bette a job at her new art gallery. Also, Kit and Sunset Boulevard throw a "guys only" night at Hit! where Max and Tom continue to argue about their problems, and the following morning, Tom walks out on Max.
68	5	"Litmus Test"	Angela Robinson	Angela Robinson	February 15, 2009
Alice and Jenny's friendship takes a hit when Alice finds out that Jenny's new script, based on the "treatment" she had written earlier, is sold for $500,000 making Alice furious, but Jenny denies doing anything wrong. While Bette and Tina continue to make business plans for the adoption, Jamie plays a third-wheel crush to Alice and Tasha. Despite arguments from the girls, Helena decides to go on a date with Dylan. But Alice, Shane, Kit and the rest of them decide to test Dylan's authenticity by asking Niki Stevens to bait Dylan at the Hit! club. Meanwhile, Bette and Tina have dinner with Kelly and her new boyfriend where Tina causes a scene at the restaurant when she sees her boss, Aaron, and William Hailsey having a dinner meeting that they didn't tell her about, and she accuses William of stealing the film negatives for 'Lez Girls' and framing her for it. Elsewhere, Jenny intrudes on Shane's personal rights, and Shane begins to grow irritated with her since Jenny reveals that she does not believe in boundaries... or morals.
69	6	"Lactose Intolerant"	John Stockwell	Elizabeth Ziff	February 22, 2009
Jenny throws a baby shower for an overwhelmed Max. But during the party, Jenny, being the nihilistic person she is, spills the beans to Dylan about the girls hiring Niki to seduce her as a test to Helena's loyalty, which causes Dylan to get upset and leave. Meanwhile, Bette and Tina begin the adoption process when they discover from Joyce that Nevada's state law refuses to grant an adoption to a non-married lesbian couple. Bette goes to her new art gallery opening-night celebration solo, putting her in the shark's tank with Kelly, while Tina flies to New York to work on a new movie project. Shane desires freedom from Jenny's clinginess, while Jamie begins to take a toll on Alice and Tasha's relationship. Shane almost cheats on Jenny with Niki, but Shane comes down with food poisoning, in which she successfully avoids both sex with Niki and being discovered by Jenny. Elsewhere, Kit meets a handsome man at Kelly's new art gallery who tries to pick her up, but she doesn't respond well to his advances.
70	7	"Last Couple Standing"	Rose Troche	Ilene Chaiken	March 1, 2009
The girls partake in a 12-hour Los Angeles Gay & Lesbian Center's dance marathon at Hit! with Sunset Boulevard as the MC. Tina and Bette consider moving to New York after Tina's job offer and Alice, as usual, spreads the news to all their friends before they've made their final decision. Sunset Boulevard makes a shocking revelation to Kit that he is the dashing young man who is trying to pick her up when not in costume. Jodi shows up at the dance marathon with her new girlfriend to further taunt Bette by entering one of the dance contests. The twisted Jenny further meddles in Bette's life by threatening to tell Tina about Bette's alleged tryst with Kelly, while Jenny further humiliates Shane when Jenny suspects Shane of cheating on her with Niki again. Dylan shows up to reconcile with Helena who accepts. The next day Bette and Tina go to the bus stop to pick up Marci who they were planning to have live with them until her baby is born, but she's a no-show.
71	8	"Last Word"	Ilene Chaiken	Ilene Chaiken	March 8, 2009
In the series finale, a celebration of friendship ends in disaster. When Bette and Tina announce they will be moving to New York for good, Jenny decides to make a farewell video for them. But her cynical ways start to drive a further wedge between her and everyone else. Alice tells Tasha that if she wants to be with Jamie to go ahead, and if she doesn't come back in 24 hours, she'll know what choice Tasha made. Helena comes to the realization that she will never be able to truly trust Dylan, so she breaks up with her for good. Kit finally gets together with Sunset Boulevard, but she is still convinced that Bette was unfaithful when Jenny shows her a video she took of Bette and Kelly. Meanwhile, Shane has a run-in with Molly Kroll who tells her about the letter she left in Shane's jacket pocket. When Shane realizes that Jenny never told her about this, she looks for the jacket in the attic and finds it... along with the missing negatives for "Lez Girls." That night, events come full circle when all of the girls find themselves in a situation with the law. Sergeant Marybeth Duffy (guest star Lucy Lawless) investigates Jenny's death when she is found floating face-down in Bette and Tina's swimming pool. Sgt. Duffy learns that all of them had a motive and opportunity to kill Jenny for her dark and destructive ways. Niki is also spotted lurking around both Bette's and Jenny's houses by the police after the discovery of the body. The series ends with all of the friends going to the police station to make their statements.

== Production ==
Showtime confirmed a sixth and final season for The L Word. Unlike the show's previous seasons, it only lasted 8 episodes to conclude the show with 71 episodes in total. Studio executives commented on the longevity of the show, with the Showtime president of entertainment Robert Greenblatt saying that The L Word has "surpassed its niche as a gay show". The sixth season premiered on January 18, 2009 and ended its original run on March 8 of the same year. Producers and writers of The L Word took viewers' opinions regarding the final season’s episodes.

Before airing the show, Creator Ilene Chaiken denied reports of socialite Paris Hilton guest starring on an interview on gaydarnation.com. In July 2008, it was confirmed that Elizabeth Berkley would star as Kelly Wentworth (née Freemont) in a multi-episode arc of the final season.
