= Ricardo Gutierrez =

American actor (born 1955)

- Born: September 28, 1955 (age 71)
- Education: Illinois State University

Ricardo Gutierrez (born September 28, 1955) is an American actor, director, and teacher. He had a recurring role as Alderman Mata on the first season of the Starz Network drama series Boss.

== Education ==
Gutierrez studied at Illinois State University.

== Career ==
=== Theater ===
Gutierrez has acted in performances at The Goodman Theatre, Steppenwolf Theatre, Victory Gardens Theater, Lookingglass Theatre Company, and Denver Center Theater. He is the former artistic director of Glass Onion Theater, Nosotros Theatre Company in Los Angeles and the Canterbury Theatre in Indiana. He was the co-artistic director of Teatro Vista, a Latino theater company in Chicago, from August 2012 (a transition period for retiring founder Edward Torres), then sole artistic director from March 2013 to September 2020.

His directorial projects include How Long Will I Cry?: Voices of Youth Violence at Steppenwolf Theater, Quiara Alegría Hudes's The Happiest Song Plays Last at the Goodman Theatre, and Kenny D'Aquila's Unorganized Crime at the Teatro Vista.

=== Television ===
Gutierrez has appeared in various television shows including Hill Street Blues, Knots Landing, Max Headroom, Hunter, and Wiseguy. In 2012 he starred as Alderman Lalo Mata on the Starz Network original drama series Boss.

== Personal life ==
Gutierrez was previously married to actress Judith Ivey.

== Filmography ==
=== Film ===
Year	Title	Role
1986	Running Scared	Sergeant Garcia
1988	The Boost	Valet
1989	Shocker	Guard Sergeant
2006	Stranger than Fiction	Bus Company Manager
TBA	Anita	Bento

=== Television ===
Year	Title	Role	Notes
1985	Lady Blue	Harvey	4 episodes
1986	Knots Landing	Police Officer	Episode: "Touch and Go"
1987	Hunter	Patrolman	Episode: "Bad Company"
1987	Max Headroom	Martinez	4 episodes
1987	Hill Street Blues	Pepe	Episode: "A Pound of Flesh"
1987	Wiseguy	Joe	Episode: "Last Rites for Lucci"
1988	Sonny Spoon	Tull	Episode: "Who's Got Tonsillitis?"
1988	Beverly Hills Buntz	Worker	Episode: "El Norte by Norte West"
1989	The Famous Teddy Z	Slate Man	Episode: "A Case of Murder"
1991	The New Adam 12	Operation Estafadores Officer	Episode: "Operation Estafadores"
1992	Nightmare in the Daylight	Priest	Television film
1999	Early Edition	Priest	Episode: "Fate"
2011	The Chicago Code	Chief Hanley	Episode: "The Gold Coin Kid"
2011	Boss	Alderman Lalo Mata	4 episodes
2014	Sirens	Father Julio	Episode: "Shotgun Wedding"
2015, 2018	Chicago P.D.	Marco Rivera / Bob Kirchen	2 episodes
2019	Chicago Fire	George Pineda	Episode: "Badlands"
2021	Chicago Med	Ruben Esquivel	Episode: "Do You Know the Way Home?"
