= Lady Blue (TV series) =

American TV series, 1985–1986

- Title card
- Genre: Detective; Action-adventure
- Created by: Robert Vincent O'Neil
- Starring: Jamie Rose; Danny Aiello; Ron Dean; Diane Dorsey; Bruce A. Young; Nan Woods; Ricardo Gutierrez
- Opening theme: "Back to the Blue" by Arnetia Walker
- Composer: John Cacavas
- Country of origin: United States
- Original language: English
- No. of seasons: 1
- No. of episodes: 13 (1 unaired), after pilot film

Production
- Executive producer: David Gerber
- Production location: Chicago
- Camera setup: Multi-camera setup
- Running time: 60 min. (including commercials)
- Production companies: David Gerber Productions; MGM/UA Television

Original release
- Network: ABC
- Release: April 15, 1985 – January 25, 1986

Lady Blue is an American detective and action-adventure television series that aired on the American Broadcasting Company (ABC) network. Created by Robert Vincent O'Neil and produced by David Gerber, with cinematography by Jack Priestley, the episodes were filmed on location in Chicago. It was picked as a series after ABC aired a two-hour television film pilot on April 15, 1985 and the series aired from September 15, 1985, to January 25, 1986 after which it was cancelled by ABC after 13 episodes.

The show revolves around Chicago detective Katy Mahoney (Jamie Rose) and her violent methods of handling cases. The supporting cast includes Danny Aiello, Ron Dean, Diane Dorsey, Bruce A. Young, Nan Woods, and Ricardo Gutierrez. Johnny Depp also guest-starred on the series in one of his earliest roles. Television critics noted Lady Blue's emphasis on violence, calling Mahoney "Dirty Harriet" (after Clint Eastwood's character Dirty Harry). Rose said she joined the project after being drawn to its genre. She prepared for the role by watching Eastwood's films, received advice from Eastwood on how to handle a gun, and practiced at a shooting range.

After the pilot aired, Lady Blue was criticized by several watchdog organizations (particularly the National Coalition on Television Violence) as the most violent show on television. After the fourth episode, ABC placed it on hiatus for a month, moved the series from Thursdays to Saturdays, then canceled it in early 1986, partially due to the complaints about excessive violence. Critical reception to the series was primarily negative during its run, but television studies author Cary O'Dell questions whether that stemmed from contemporary sexism. The series' rights are owned by Metro-Goldwyn-Mayer, which has not released Lady Blue on DVD, Blu-ray, nor any online streaming service.

== Premise and characters ==
Critics compared Katy Mahoney to Dirty Harry due to her frequent use of violence. Jamie Rose was advised by Clint Eastwood on how to handle a gun, and practiced at a shooting range.

A detective and action-adventure television series, Lady Blue revolves around Chicago investigator Katy Mahoney (Jamie Rose), her violent means of dealing with criminals and tension with her co-workers. She works in the Violent Crimes Division of the Chicago Police Department. The New York Observer's Bryan Reesman described Mahoney as "the fiery red head" with a "trigger happy" personality and "violent excesses". She frequently uses a .357 Magnum (which John J. O'Connor of The New York Times called "a grotesque extension of her right arm"), and was introduced as capable of "read[ing] a crime in progress like most guys read the sports page".

Mahoney's reliance on violence is emphasized in the opening scene of the pilot; she sees a bank robbery while she is in a beauty parlor, shoots and kills three of the perpetrators, and returns to the salon for a pedicure. Television critics and the show's promotional materials called Mahoney "Dirty Harriet" and "Dirty Harriette", comparing her aggressive behavior to Clint Eastwood's character Dirty Harry, and Jon Anderson of the Chicago Tribune described her as "somewhat like Quick Draw McGraw with touches of John Wayne and Clint Eastwood". According to Rose, Mahoney was inspired by Dirty Harry, Wayne, and Rambo. Mahoney and other characters refer to the number of excessive-force complaints filed against her during the series, and she often has difficulties with Internal Affairs.

Although Mahoney was portrayed at odds with most of her superiors, her boss Lt. Terry McNichols (Danny Aiello) is more sympathetic and understanding towards her. McNichols is portrayed as fond of chili dogs and appreciative of Mahoney's more unorthodox methods of handling criminals, although he still criticizes her reliance on violence. Rose described McNichols as similar to a character in the crime drama The Sopranos. Describing Aiello's performance, O'Connor wrote that McNichols "offer[ed] an uncanny impersonation of the punch-drunk Slapsie Maxie Rosenbloom in a 1940's movie".

Mahoney's father, brother, and married lover were killed in the line of duty before the series begins, and O'Connor connected these events to the character's "toughness and determination to survive". Other characters include detective Gino Gianelli (Ron Dean) and his wife Rose (Diane Dorsey), Officer Cassidy (Bruce A. Young), McNichols' niece Willow (Nan Woods), and Mahoney's informant Harvey (Ricardo Gutierrez). In one of his earliest roles, American actor Johnny Depp guest-starred in an episode as the brother of a serial killer. Mexican actress Katy Jurado appeared in the pilot as cocaine kingpin Dona Maria Theresa, and American actors Ajay Naidu and Jim Brown portrayed "worldly-wise waif" Paquito and a "South Side drug czar", respectively. Aiello's best friend was an extra in the series, the cast and crew calling his character "Detective Joe Background". Tom Shales of The Washington Post described the show's tone as "baldly campy [and] ultra-violent".

== Production ==
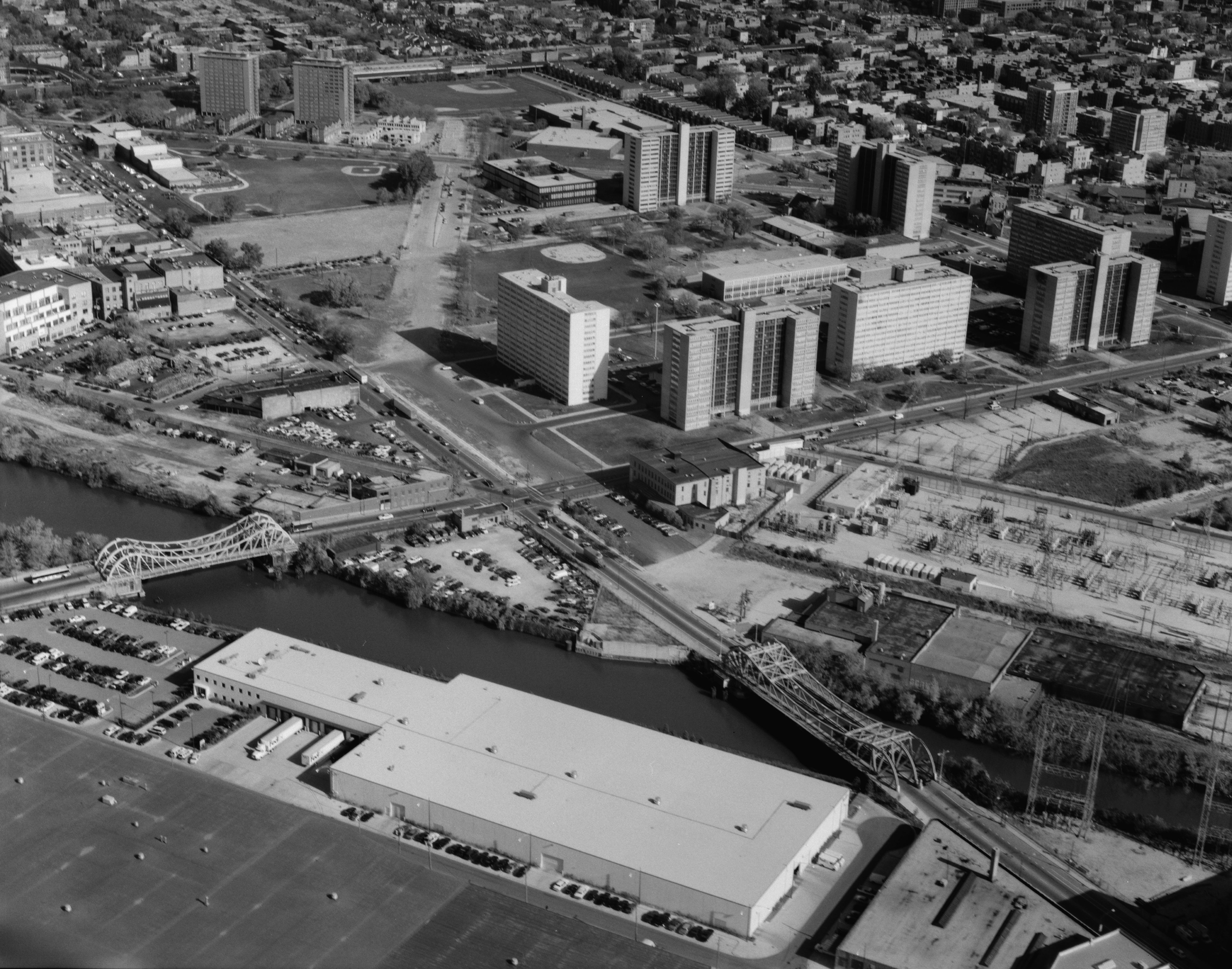
One episode was filmed in the Cabrini–Green Homes, pictured in 1999.

Lady Blue was created by Robert Vincent O'Neil. The executive producer was David Gerber. Directors Guy Magar and Gary Nelson worked on the series, while Jack Priestley was the cinematographer. Produced by MGM Television and David Gerber Productions, its musical score was composed by John Cacavas. Actress Arnetia Walker performed the show's theme song, "Back to the Blue". Lady Blue was filmed on location in various areas of Chicago, including the Cabrini–Green Homes. Rose recalled having a difficult time in Cabrini Green since the residents threatened the cast and crew and threw bottles at them during filming.

Mahoney was Rose's first role after playing Vickie Gioberti in the soap opera Falcon Crest; Reesman wrote that the decision to cast Rose in Lady Blue was a surprise, since she was primarily known for appearing as a child with Bugs Bunny in a Kool-Aid commercial. According to Reesman, Mahoney's "steely nerve and conservative stance on crime" contrasted with Rose's "more upbeat, fun-loving, liberal persona". Rose said that she was drawn to the show's genre: "Action shows are so fun because I got to be strapped to things, hoisted over things, shoot the gun, and jump on moving cars. It was like doing a western." According to the Orange County Register, Mahoney is one of the actress's best-known roles.

To prepare for Lady Blue, Rose watched Clint Eastwood films (including the Dirty Harry franchise) and practiced steadying her gun hand. She had worked with Eastwood in the 1984 film Tightrope and a portion of the anthology series Amazing Stories, and received advice on how to mimic using a gun from Eastwood. In addition to Eastwood's assistance, Rose practiced gun-handling at a Chicago shooting range. Although Rose described her role as "physically demanding", she said she was not attempting method acting and relied on stunt doubles during filming. Rose resisted comparisons to Dirty Harry, and said: "It's still going to be a lot different because I'm a woman and I can show lots more emotions than Mr. Eastwood."

According to Jamie Rose, Lady Blue had a similar concept as the crime dramas Police Woman and Get Christie Love!; Reesman stated that the latter was not as violent as Lady Blue. John J. O'Connor compared the series' violence to Eastwood's work, and saw it as a combination of Wonder Woman and Dick Tracy comic strips. In the 2011 book Triumph of the Walking Dead: Robert Kirkman's Zombie Epic on Page and Screen, horror fiction writer Vince A. Liaguno described Lady Blue and NYPD Blue as part of a movement towards "grittier depictions of violence". In a 2017 interview, Rose said that Lady Blue was the most violent series of its time and there had been little public exposure to a character as "bloodthirsty" as Mahoney; however, she said that the series was less graphic than future television programs.

== Episodes ==
No.	Title	Directed by	Written by	Original release date
1	"Pilot"	Gary Nelson	Robert Vincent O'Neil	April 15, 1985
Homicide detective Katy Mahoney is transferred to the "Matron Squad" of the Chicago Police Department after several charges of excessive force are filed against her. While investigating a shoplifting case and the murders of two women and their children, she discovers that they are all related to cocaine trafficking.
2	"Death Valley Day"	Virgil Vogel	Nancy Audley and Howard Chesley	September 26, 1985
Mahoney investigates a murder at a housing project and discovers that the area is terrorized by Alvin Banger and his gang. When she learns that Banger forces children to steal from stores and homes, she decides to bring down the gang.
3	"Romeo and Juliet"	Robert Vincent O'Neil	Mark Rodgers	October 3, 1985
During a war between two rival street gangs, a man and a woman from the opposing sides develop feelings for one another and Mahoney tries to help them find a future together.
4	"Beasts of Prey"	Guy Magar	Anthony Lawrence and Nancy Lawrence	October 10, 1985
Mahoney tracks a serial killer while investigating a string of South Side murders. She asks her informer Della to do some undercover work. Mahoney is devastated when Della's mutilated body is found but Della managed to capture the identity of the killers on film before she died.
5	"The Widow-Maker"	Mike Vejar	Allison Hock	October 17, 1985
Mahoney searches for a Vietnamese assassin who is programmed to kill former soldiers and refugees who have moved to America.
6	"The Hunter"	Christian I. Nyby II	Robert Vincent O'Neil	November 16, 1985
Mahoney investigates a series of murders committed with unconventional weapons and poisons.
7	"Portrait of Death"	Mike Vejar	Anthony Lawrence and Nancy Lawrence	November 23, 1985
An imprisoned criminal mastermind hires hitmen to kill everyone responsible for her conviction, starting with Mahoney and her former lover. Mahoney discovers that her ex-partner is a lawyer with questionable connections.
8	"Terror"	John Florea	Bill Driskill	November 30, 1985
While infiltrating a terrorist organization, Mahoney discovers that their main objective is to dismantle Chicago's political system.
9	"Designer White"	Arnold Laven	Michael Ahnemann	December 7, 1985
Hot on the trail of a drug ring, Mahoney becomes a victim when she is injected with a new type of bootleg hallucinogen designer drug during an encounter with a drug dealer in a police raid. Plagued by these drug-induced hallucinations, strange visions, paranoia and paralysis, Katy flees by wandering around the city and McNichols finds himself in a race against time to find Katy before she hurts someone.
10	"Death Grip"	Guy Magar	Mark Rodgers	December 21, 1985
While tracking down a hitman who kills local drug kingpins, Mahoney discovers that he is part of a larger plot to establish an international narcotics operation.
11	"Scorpio's Sting"	John Hancock	Robert Vincent O'Neill	January 11, 1986
Mahoney is tasked to find a former Green Beret and his gang, who are killing people for thrills.
12	"Sylvie"	Mike Vejar	Michael Ahemann	January 18, 1986
During an investigation, Mahoney discovers that a policewoman was murdered to cover up a scandal involving politicians, pornographers, and bankers.
13	"Maximum Force"	Jerry Jameson	Mark Rodgers	January 25, 1986
Mahoney and detective Gino Gianelli are kidnapped by a group seeking vengeance for an arrest.
14	"Willow's Cowboy"	Jerry Jameson	Mark Rodgers	Unaired
While searching for Terry McNichols' missing niece, Mahoney becomes involved with a group of cowboys trying to steal a shipment of bull semen.

== Broadcast history ==
Thirteen episodes of Lady Blue were broadcast on ABC between September 15, 1985 and January 25, 1986. The pilot episode was aired as a television film on April 15, 1985, before it was aired as part of the series in September of that year. According to Lee Margulies of the Los Angeles Times, the pilot film received high ratings. When the series began, its emphasis on violence was criticized and it was included on watchdog organization lists. A total of 18 characters were killed in the pilot, and producers had promised future episodes would feature more deaths. The National Coalition on Television Violence called it the "most violent program" on television during the series' run. In response to the criticism, Rose said that Lady Blue was set in "more of the heroic fantasy world" and compared Mahoney to a superhero; she explained that series was not intended to be a realistic representation of the police.

Lady Blue was initially broadcast on Thursday nights at 9 pm EST; the series ranked third in its time slot, behind the half-hour sitcoms Cheers and Night Court and the detective series Simon & Simon. After four episodes aired, it was moved to Saturday nights at 9 pm EST to accommodate The Colbys and to replace Lime Street, which was forced to cease production after the death of Samantha Smith and her father in a plane crash during its production. ABC announced that it ordered a limited number of episodes of Lady Blue in its new time, but the series would be moved to another day "without interrupting the weekly flow" if it was successful. While on that Saturdays-at-9-pm timeslot, it aired against The Golden Girls and 227, and continued to receive complaints of excessive violence.

ABC canceled Lady Blue in 1986. Reesman also attributed the decision to low ratings. After the end of the series, Rose said: "It was still a great experience. You don't get much opportunity to star in your own series, especially if you're a woman." Lady Blue was rebroadcast on Lifetime, following the network's tradition of airing shows depicting female characters in traditionally-male occupations; other examples include female private detectives in Veronica Clare and Partners in Crime as well as a female physician in Kay O'Brien. The series has not been released on DVD, Blu-ray or an online-streaming service. Metro-Goldwyn-Mayer owns the rights to Lady Blue, but a studio spokesperson said that there were no plans for a home release.

== Critical reception ==
During its run, Lady Blue received primarily negative reviews due to its emphasis on violence. Although O'Connor criticized the series for its "mindless violence and questionable law enforcement", Anderson felt that the show had potential: "Perhaps, with a little more seasoning on the Chicago police department, Jamie Rose might become a star." In his 1991 book The TV Encyclopedia, David Inman called Lady Blue "one of the dumbest shows ever on ABC—and that's saying a lot". Lloyd Grove of The Washington Post criticized the reliance on violence "[that] overpowers, and eventually sours, what could have been an agreeably fast-paced show". In response to the pilot, Grove also panned its writer Robert Vincent O'Neil for copying ideas from Clint Eastwood films and the 1971 film The French Connection. Despite negative reviews, Reesman reported that teenage and young adult males responded positively to Mahoney's attitude and appearance.

In his 2013 book June Cleaver Was a Feminist!: Reconsidering the Female Characters of Early Television, television studies author Cary O'Dell called Lady Blue an "interesting experiment" in imagining the "hardcore cop genre with a female lead". According to O'Dell, criticism of Mahoney and the series' ultimate cancellation were the results of sexism: "Was such rebellion, contempt for authority, and brutal tactics considered too 'unfeminine'?" The author felt that Lady Blue was ahead of its time, contrasting Mahoney's negative reception with the positive reaction to the titular protagonists of the 1991 film Thelma & Louise, who have developed a legacy as "newfangled feminist icons".
