= Jim Bartley (actor) =

Irish actor

Jim Bartley (born 1945) is an Irish actor best known for his part as Bela Doyle in the Irish soap opera Fair City, a part he has played from 1990-2023, when he departed offscreen. His other television credits include Fatal Inheritance, The Bill, Joyriders, Taffin, The Fantasist, Inside, The Irish R.M., Teems of Times, Coronation Street, Underground, Ulysses, Tolka Row and Z-Cars. He has also had film roles in War of the Buttons, M.A.N.: Matrix Adjusted Normal, Teresa's Wedding and The Pink Panther Strikes Again.

He married actress Barbara Brennan in 1973. They had two children, Emmet and Eva, but separated in 1984. Emmet died in 1987, aged nine. Eva also became an actress. He lives with his partner Helen Cahill in Tallaght, County Dublin.

He has taken regular breaks from acting due to him having strokes.

On 24 May 2013, Bartley had a full segment of The Late Late Show set aside in honour of his 55 years in showbiz. His former Fair City co-star and screen wife Jean Costello was sitting in the audience and was reported to be "disgusted" that she was snubbed. Costello was also reported to have been offended at an off-the-cuff remark about a "bereavement" suffered following the death of Costello's character, without mentioning her character's name.

== Partial filmography ==
- Ulysses (1967) - Private Carr
- Underground (1970) - First Maquis
- The Pink Panther Strikes Again (1976) - Second Police Escort on Train (uncredited)
- The Fantasist (1986) - Hugh Teeling
- Taffin (1988) - Conway
- Joyriders (1988) - Tony
- Fatal Inheritance (1993) - Quinn
- War of the Buttons (1994) - Fergus' Stepfather

== See also ==
- List of longest-serving soap opera actors#Ireland
