= Moira Harris =

American actress

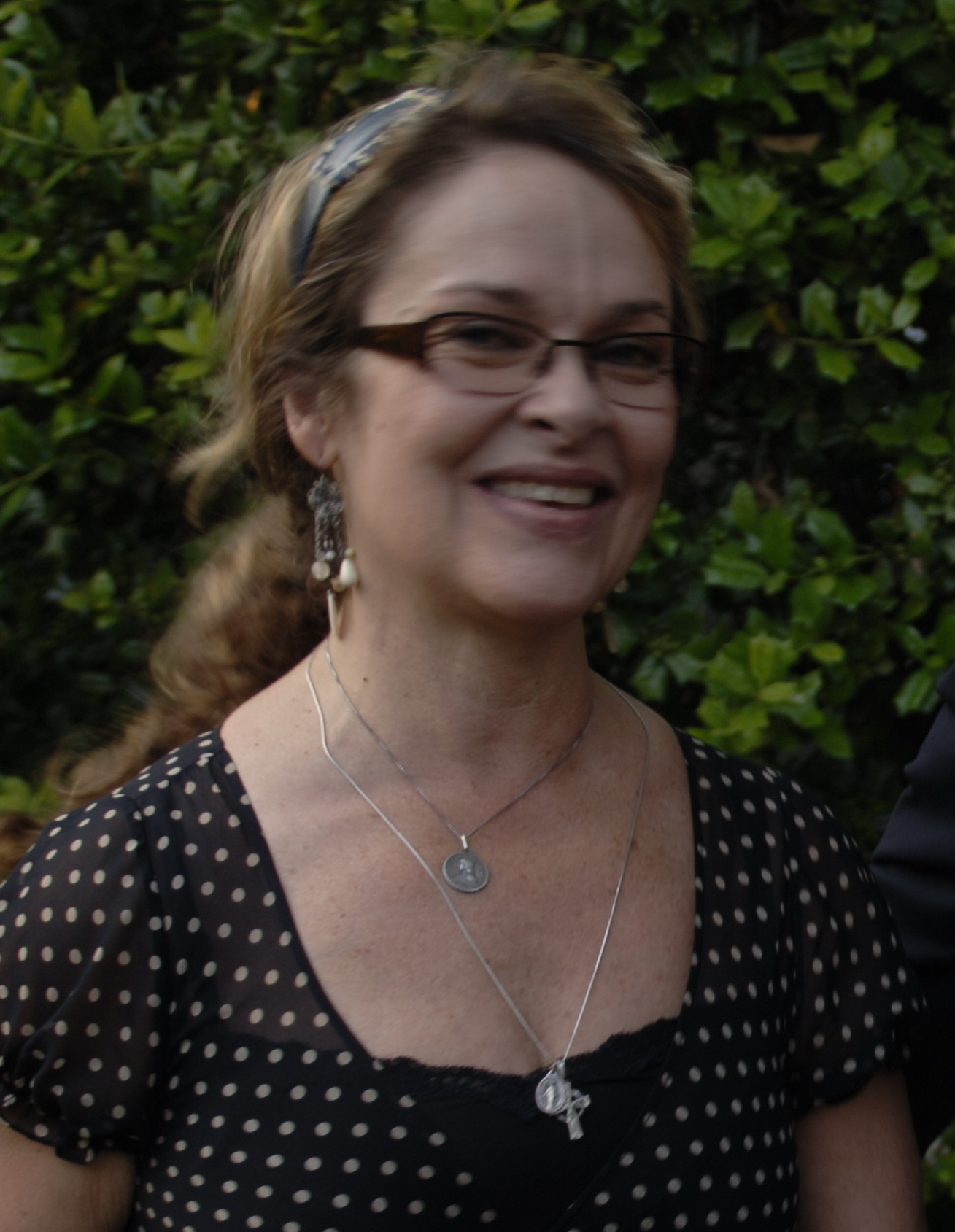
- Harris in 2007
- Born: Pontiac, Illinois, U.S.
- Other name: Moira Sinise
- Education: Illinois State University
- Occupation: Actress
- Years active: 1986–2013
- Spouse: Gary Sinise (m. 1981)
- Children: 3

Moira Sinise (née Harris) is an American former actress. She appeared in several films and television shows. She is married to actor-filmmaker Gary Sinise.

== Early life and education ==
Harris was born in Pontiac, Illinois, and is a Roman Catholic convert. She graduated from Illinois State University in Normal. During her college years, she met her husband, Gary Sinise, and they have been married since 1981. They had three children, Mac, Sophie and Ella. Their son, McCanna "Mac" Anthony Sinise, who was a musician, died on January 5, 2024 at the age of 33 from chordoma, which is a rare type of cancer. He had been diagnosed with chordoma in 2018 and eventually became paralyzed from the waist down.

== Acting career ==
Harris has appeared in such films as One More Saturday Night, Of Mice and Men (directed by and co-starring her husband), and Terminator 3: Rise of the Machines. She also played the evil trucker's wife in the Kurt Russell movie Breakdown. She has made a guest appearances on the TV shows Karen Sisco, The Equalizer, and Crime Story. At one time, she was a member of the Steppenwolf Theatre Company that Gary Sinise was instrumental in establishing. In 1987 she won a Chicago / Midwest Emmy Award for her role in Murder in Green Meadows. She also starred in Disney's Tall Tale in 1995. Harris retired in 2003, although she briefly returned to the stage in 2013, appearing in Harold Pinter's The Birthday Party at Steppenwolf.

== Filmography ==
- Welcome Home, Bobby (1986, TV movie) - Ann Marie
- The Fantasist (1986) - Patricia Teeling
- One More Saturday Night (1986) - Peggy
- Crime Story (1986, TV series) - Dressler's Wife
- The Equalizer (1987, TV series, "Blood & Wine") - Linda
- Miles from Home (1988) - Frank's Girl (uncredited)
- Of Mice and Men (1992) - Girl in Red Dress
- Between Love and Hate (1993, TV movie) - Katherine Templeton
- Nannie & Alex (1995) - Nonnie's Mother
- Tall Tale (1995) - Sarah Hackett
- Three Wishes (1995) - Katherine Holman
- Breakdown (1997) - Arleen Barr
- Chicago Cab (1997) - Religious Mother
- Steppenwolf Theatre Company: 25 Years on the Edge (2000, documentary) - Herself
- Terminator 3: Rise of the Machines (2003) - Betsy
- Karen Sisco (2003, TV series) - The Waitress
- Lt. Dan Band: For the Common Good (2011, documentary) - Herself

== Personal life ==
Harris married actor Gary Sinise in 1981. She was diagnosed with breast cancer in 2018 and as of 2024 she is cancer-free. They had three children, Mac, Sophie and Ella.

Her son, McCanna "Mac" Anthony Sinise (born on November 10, 1990), died on January 5, 2024 and was laid to rest on January 23, 2024 in a Catholic service. He had been diagnosed in 2018 with chordoma, a rare cancer of the spine. Mac was a musician who had worked for his father's charitable foundation, and before his death, he had completed work on an album Resurrection & Revival.

Moira is a practicing Catholic; she converted to the faith in 2000.
