= Welcome Home, Bobby =

1986 television film directed by Herbert Wise

- Written by: Conrad Bromberg
- Directed by: Herbert Wise
- Starring: Timothy Williams; Tony Lo Bianco; Adam Baldwin; Nan Woods
- Music by: David McHugh
- Country of origin: United States
- Original language: English

Production
- Producers: Robert Berger; Herbert Brodkin; Thomas De Wolfe; Cyma Rubin
- Cinematography: Barry Sonnenfeld
- Editor: Robert M. Reitano
- Running time: 100 minutes

Original release
- Network: CBS
- Release: February 22, 1986

Welcome Home, Bobby is a 1986 American made-for-television drama film directed by Herbert Wise and written by Conrad Bromberg. The movie stars Timothy Williams, Nan Woods, Tony Lo Bianco, Adam Baldwin, John Karlen and Moira Harris. It premiered on CBS on February 22, 1986. The movie deals with themes of sexual identity and homophobia, set against the backdrop of a Chicago high school and its students.

== Plot ==
Bobby Cavalero is a 16-year-old high school student who is questioning his sexual identity. He is an award-winning math student and a member of his high school swim team, who gets caught up in a drug bust. He is later exonerated, but because of the investigation, information comes out that he had a sexual relationship with an older man in his 30s, Mark Reed. When students at the school find out about Bobby's sexual encounter, they start shunning him, verbally abuse him, and call for his expulsion from school.

After some members of the swim team discover Bobby swimming laps alone, they jump in the pool and try to drown him. His father, Joe is an ultra-conservative working class man who rejects the idea that his son might be gay. He is also extremely homophobic. When he finds Bobby wrestling with his younger brother, Joe beats the hell out of Bobby. His mother, Rose doesn't really understand why her son is questioning his sexuality, but she does try to offer support. The only people who do support him are his ex-girlfriend Beth, his bohemian friend Cleary, and Mr. Geffin, a closeted gay teacher at his school. Mr. Geffin opens up to Bobby and tells him he lives a quiet, happy life with his lover, but nonetheless is still closeted. In the end, Bobby's sexuality is still ambiguous.

== Cast ==
- Timothy Williams as Bobby Cavalero
- Tony Lo Bianco as Joe Cavalero
- Anthony Candell as Donny Cavalero
- Gisela Caldwell as Rose Cavalero
- Adam Baldwin as Cleary
- Nan Woods as Beth
- John Karlen as Mr. Geffin
- Stephen James as Mark Reed
- Moira Harris as Ann Marie
- John Pleshette as John Hammill

== Critical reception ==
David Friedman wrote in The Philadelphia Inquirer that the problem with the movie "isn't its intentions, which are clearly noble, or its depiction of Bobby and his situation, which is clearly sympathetic. It's the lifeless execution of those high-minded sentiments that sends "Welcome" stumbling into the depths of Snore City". Friedman also had a problem with the character Joe Cavalero (Bobby's dad), whose dialogue in the film included, "The men in this family are men...Thank God my father isn't alive to see this. These gays, they spit on us. They talk about their rights. What right do they have to spread their disease?" Historian Stephen Tropiano said, "despite some overly melodramatic moments between father and son, William's performance perfectly captures the confusion and angst experienced by many teens coming to terms with their sexual identity."

In his review for The Washington Blade, Noel Gillespie said the movie was "well-acted, cleverly and convincingly written, smoothly directed, and objectively developed." He also praised Timothy Williams for making the lead character "both appealing and believable and receives strong support from a fine cast...the script avoids nearly all the pat answers and situations that might be expected." Keith Howes of GLAAD observed, "there is, as usual, nary a hint that anything approaching a gay community or a small group of understanding individuals could be there for Bobby to help him sort through his muddled feelings."
