= The Betty Ford Story =

1987 TV biopic directed by David Greene

- Genre: Biography; Drama
- Based on: The Times of My Life by Betty Ford; Chris Chase
- Written by: Karen Hall
- Directed by: David Greene
- Starring: Gena Rowlands; Josef Sommer; Nan Woods
- Music by: Arthur B. Rubinstein
- Country of origin: United States
- Original language: English

Production
- Executive producers: Robert Papazian; David L. Wolper
- Producer: Mark Wolper
- Production locations: Long Beach Naval Hospital; Long Beach, California
- Cinematography: Dennis Dalzell
- Editor: Parkie L. Singh
- Production companies: David L. Wolper Productions; Warner Bros. Television

Original release
- Network: ABC
- Release: March 2, 1987

The Betty Ford Story is a 1987 television film directed by David Greene and written by Karen Hall. This biographical film was based on the book The Times of My Life written by Chris Chase and Betty Ford. The film originally aired on ABC.

== Cast ==
- Gena Rowlands as Betty Ford
- Josef Sommer as President Gerald Ford
- Nan Woods as Susan Ford
- Bradley Whitford as Jack Ford
- Concetta Tomei as Jan
- John Hostetter as News Director

== Awards and nominations ==
Casting Society of America

- Best Casting for TV Movie of the Week (nominated)

Emmy Awards

- Outstanding Lead Actress in a Miniseries or a Special (Gena Rowlands, won)
- Outstanding Costuming for a Miniseries or a Special (nominated)

Golden Globe Awards

- Best Actress in a Mini-Series or Motion Picture Made for TV (Gena Rowlands, won)
