= Loser Love =

- Directed by: Jean-Marc Vallée
- Release date: 1999
- Running time: 82 minutes
- Country: Canada
- Language: English

Loser Lover is a 1999 erotic thriller film directed by Jean-Marc Vallée.

== Cast ==
- Laurel Holloman as Lily Delacroix
- Andy Davoli as Tim
- Rachel Robinson as Kilo
- Burt Young as Sydney Delacroix
- Lauren Hutton as Annie Delacroix
