= Nan Woods =

American actress

- Born: Susan Nan Woods; June 21, 1966 (age 60); Chicago, Illinois, U.S.
- Occupation: Actress
- Years active: 1986–1991

Susan Nan Woods (born June 21, 1966) is a retired American actress who began her brief career in the mid-1980s. Her best-known role was Cherry White in the first two seasons of the ABC television series China Beach.

After working for four years and appearing in the first two seasons of China Beach, along with a number of film roles and TV movies, Woods decided acting was not for her and retired at the age of 22.

== Filmography ==
- China Beach (TV series) (15 episodes, 1988–1989) - Cherry White
- In the Mood (1987) - Madeline
- The Betty Ford Story (1987) (TV movie) - Susan Ford
- Lady Blue (TV series) (1 episode, "Willow", 1986) - Willow
- One More Saturday Night (1986) - Diane Lundahl
- Welcome Home, Bobby (1986) (TV movie) - Beth
