= The Price of Love (1995 film) =

1995 American made-for-television drama film

- Written by: Ronald Parker
- Directed by: David Burton Morris
- Starring: Peter Facinelli; Laurel Holloman; Jay R. Ferguson; Alexis Cruz; Harvey Silver
- Music by: Tim Truman
- Country of origin: United States
- Original language: English

Production
- Executive producer: David Gerber
- Producer: Guy J. Louthan
- Cinematography: John L. Demps Jr.
- Editor: Corky Ehlers
- Running time: 97 minutes
- Production companies: David Gerber Productions; Polygram Filmed Entertainment

Original release
- Network: Fox
- Release: November 28, 1995

The Price of Love is a 1995 American made-for-television drama film written by Ronald Parker and directed by David Burton Morris. It stars Peter Facinelli, Laurel Holloman, Jay R. Ferguson, Alexis Cruz and Harvey Silver. The film premiered on Fox on November 28, 1995. The movie deals with the plight of homeless youth living on the streets.

== Plot ==
Sixteen-year-old Brett lives with his indifferent father and an abusive stepmother who kicks him out of the house. He decides not to even try and reconcile with his parents, and heads to Los Angeles. On his way there, he meets some drifters, and is attracted to one of them, Roxanne. They decide to continue together to L.A. on their own. After arriving in Los Angeles, Roxanne is quickly arrested by the police, so Brett is on his own again. He is living in an abandoned building with other homeless youth, until their lair is raided by the police. Forced out onto the streets, he meets and eventually befriends Beau, Alberto and Tony, all living on the street and earning a living as male hustlers. Unable to find a job, Brett also turns to male prostitution, but he is strictly gay-for-pay. All Brett really wants though is a normal stable life, and in order to obtain that, he feels like he must turn himself over to child services and become a ward of the state.

== Cast ==
- Peter Facinelli as Brett
- Laurel Holloman as Roxanne
- Jay R. Ferguson as Beau
- Alexis Cruz as Alberto
- Harvey Silver as Puff
- Steven Martini as Tony
- Ben Gould as Max
- Martin Cassidy as Burt

== Production notes ==
When the 1995 movie was made available to the media for screening, a press kit accompanied the movie which featured an interview with Dr. Lois Lee, founder of Children of the Night, who estimated that 1 million to 1.5 million children run away from home each year and that about a third of them get involved in prostitution or pornography. According to Dr. Lee, most of the hustlers' clients, at least in Hollywood, are attorneys, and she also notes – "I think 95 percent are white and 75 percent are married." Additionally, Lee makes the case that hustlers "generally don't have a long shelf life...depending upon how long your looks last, you're washed up as a prostitute around age 23 or 24".

The film was shot on the streets of Hollywood, and the cast of the movie includes a number of real-life Hollywood street kids in minor roles and as extras.

== Critical reception ==
John J. O'Connor wrote in The New York Times that the film featured a "remarkably affectation-free performance by Peter Facinelli" and he is fortunate enough to be surrounded by a "first-rate supporting cast...[who] contribute the kind of on-target performances that lift The Price of Love above a mere clinical case history". Variety said the movie is dotted with "compelling characters", and Holloman "weaves a performance that, while tinged with vulnerability, captures her character’s innate sense of self-preservation". The Baltimore Sun came down on the film for being "maddeningly irresponsible" in the way it ignores AIDS, but otherwise praised David Gerber and David Burton Morris for going the "extra mile in terms of script and photography", and also noted that "Bret's journey into the empty, urban, neon nightmare of teen prostitution in Hollywood is compelling".

The Deseret News said the movie takes a rather "unflinching look at the horrors of this life" of living on the streets with the "violence, the disease, the trouble with the law". But at the same time, "it handles the situation of teenage boys selling their bodies without exploiting it". John Voorhees of The Seattle Times wrote "Ronald Parker's script doesn't glamorize life on the streets, yet treats the prostitution angle with sensitivity, while director David Morris gets affecting performances from an uniformly good cast. Facinelli is believable as the teen in crisis".

== See also ==
- Homelessness among LGBT youth in the United States
- List of made-for-television films with LGBT characters
- Male prostitution
- Youth homelessness
