= The Fantasist =

1987 film by Robin Hardy

- DVD cover
- Directed by: Robin Hardy
- Written by: Robin Hardy
- Based on: Goosefoot by Patrick McGinley
- Produced by: Mark Forstater; Vivien Pottersman
- Starring: Moira Sinise; Christopher Cazenove; Timothy Bottoms
- Cinematography: Frank Gell
- Edited by: Thomas Schwalm
- Music by: Stanislas Syrewicz
- Production companies: Incorporated Television Company; New Irish Film Productions
- Distributed by: Blue Dolphin Films; Gala Film Distributors
- Release dates: 23 January 1987 (Dublin: Savoy Theatre); 27 February 1987 (London: Warner West End)
- Running time: 98 minutes
- Countries: Ireland; United Kingdom
- Language: English

The Fantasist

is a 1987 thriller film written and directed by Robin Hardy. The film stars Moira Sinise, Christopher Cazenove and Timothy Bottoms. It is based on the 1983 novel Goosefoot by Irish author Patrick McGinley.

== Plot ==
An Irish woman moves from rural Ireland to Dublin and begins receiving phone calls from a stranger while the city is being plagued by a serial killer who uses this method to lure his victims in. Even though she is aware of this, she finds herself drawn to the caller. An American teacher living in her building comes under suspicion.

== Cast ==
- Moira Sinise (credited as Moira Harris) as Patricia Teeling
- Christopher Cazenove as Inspector McMyler
- Timothy Bottoms as Danny Sullivan
- John Kavanagh as Robert Foxley
- Mick Lally as Uncle Lar
- Bairbre Ní Chaoimh as Monica Quigley
- Jim Bartley as Hugh Teeling
- Deirdre Donnelly as Fionnuala Sullivan
- Liam O'Callaghan as Farrelly
- Ronan Wilmot as Patricia's Father
- May Giles as Patricia's Mother
- Se Ledwidge as Patsy Teeling
- Dervla Kirwan as Fiona

== Production ==
Bob Geldof was originally cast to appear in the film, but did not end up being involved in the production.
