= The Rising Place =

- Directed by: Tom Rice
- Screenplay by: Tom Rice
- Based on: The Rising Place by David Armstrong
- Produced by: Tracy A. Ford; Marshall Peck; Tom Rice
- Starring: Laurel Holloman; Elise Neal; Mark Webber
- Cinematography: Jim Dollarhide
- Edited by: Mary Morrisey
- Music by: Conrad Pope
- Distributed by: Flatland Pictures (United States); Vantage Media (via VMI Worldwide, select territories)
- Release date: November 8, 2002
- Running time: 89 minutes 92 minutes
- Country: United States
- Language: English

The Rising Place is a 2002 American drama film written and directed by Tom Rice and starring Laurel Holloman, Elise Neal and Mark Webber, filmed in 2001. It is based on the novel of the same name by David Armstrong.

== Summary ==
The close friendship of two young women, each of a different race, and their struggle to find purpose in their lives during this time of social injustice and world war.

== Cast ==
- Laurel Holloman as Emily Hodge
- Elise Neal as Wilma Watson
- Mark Webber as Will Bacon
- Liam Aiken as Emmett Wilder
- Billy Campbell as Streete Wilder
- Gary Cole as Avery Hodge
- Alice Drummond as Aunt Millie
- Frances Fisher as Virginia Wilder
- Mason Gamble as Franklin Pou (age 12)
- Beth Grant as Melvina Pou
- Tess Harper as Rebecca Hodge
- S. Epatha Merkerson as Lessie Watson
- Scott Openshaw as Eddie Scruggs
- Frances Sternhagen as Ruth Wilder
- Jennifer Holliday as Sadie

== Reception ==
The film has a 13% rating on Rotten Tomatoes. Ed Gonzalez of Slant Magazine awarded the film two stars out of four.
