= Attorney misconduct =

Unethical or illegal conduct by an attorney

Attorney misconduct is unethical or illegal conduct by an attorney. Attorney misconduct may include: conflict of interest, overbilling, false or misleading statements, knowingly pursuing frivolous and meritless lawsuits, concealing evidence, abandoning a client, failing to disclose all relevant facts, arguing a position while neglecting to disclose prior law which might counter the argument, or having sex with a client.

The advent of electronic record-keeping and "e-discovery" has also resulted in a record number of attorney sanctions for a range of abuses from failure to produce to the leaking of sealed documents. In a case highlighting such abuses, in 2007 plaintiffs in a pharmaceutical lawsuit were found to conspire with attorneys and journalists to publicize protected discovery documents defying a judge's protective order.

Legal malpractice is a separate concept such as when an attorney fails to adequately, professionally, competently, or zealously represent a client. While malpractice and misconduct may often be found in the same matter, they are separate concepts and need not both exist.

== Codification of rules and enforcement ==
The American Bar Association (ABA) has established model rules of professional conduct expected of attorneys, which most states in the U.S. have incorporated as part of their state laws. Each state issues its own set of rules governing the ethical rules and the related enforcement of those rules, generally through their state bar associations. As the state bar organizations and their enforcement mechanisms are composed of lawyers who set the rules, the regulation of attorney ethics is self regulated and self policed. Some academic researchers and industry pundits have asserted that attorney discipline in the U.S. is ineffective, and favors lawyers and law firms.

Individual lawyers or their firms may be cited for misconduct by a judge in the originating proceedings or by a corresponding state bar.

=== No solicitation rule ===
Ethical rules place limits on how attorneys can advertise for, and solicit, potential clients. Direct mail contact after an airline crash is permitted after the 45 days have passed. Since Bates v. State Bar of Arizona, lawyers have been permitted to advertise for clients as long as the ads are not false or misleading. Prior to the decision in 1977, acceptable advertising was limited to professional journals.

In Ohralik v. Ohio State Bar Assn., the U.S. Supreme Court upheld rules prohibiting lawyers from making unsolicited in-person or telephone contact with potential clients. Contacting clients by means of written solicitations is permissible, although some states require attorneys to include a notice to potential clients that the written solicitation is an advertisement. In general, lawyers can communicate in person or by telephone with potential clients with whom they already have a professional or personal relationship. Lawyers are allowed to solicit clients for litigation related to political causes instead of seeking money.

== External links & articles ==
- American Bar Association
- American Bar Association Model Rules of Professional Conduct
