= Tina Kennard =

Tina Porter-Kennard
- First appearance: Pilot (episode 1.01)
- Last appearance: Last Word (episode 6.08)
- Created by: Ilene Chaiken
- Portrayed by: Laurel Holloman

In-universe information
- Gender: Female
- Occupation: Chief Development Executive for Peabody-Shaolin Film Studios
- Family: Lovers = Bette Porter (wife), Eric, Helena Peabody, Henry Young, Brenda, Carrie = Children = Angelica Porter-Kennard (biological daughter) unborn baby boy (miscarried)

Tina Porter-Kennard is a fictional character played by Laurel Holloman on the Showtime television network series The L Word and The L Word: Generation Q. Tina lives in Los Angeles, California, and spends her free time in West Hollywood. She is the mother of Angelica Porter-Kennard and initially the life partner of Bette Porter (Jennifer Beals). After she and Bette break up, the two become on-again-off-again lovers for the rest of the series, and eventually marry and divorce, only to reconnect and remarry ten years later.

== Storyline ==
=== Backstory ===
Tina Kennard was born into a suburban family in Yuma, Arizona, the youngest of three children. Her father was a "rabid right-wing" Republican who served as the Mayor of Yuma for three terms. Through the interrogation tapes, it is explained that Tina and her two older siblings, a sister and brother, were abruptly moved from Yuma to Atlanta, Georgia by her mother when Tina was 11, after Tina's father had refused to end his extramarital affair and Tina's mother decided to leave her husband and take their three children with her. Tina's mother later died just after Tina graduated from college.

When Tina was age 11 to 14, her older sister sexually abused her. Her sister became a born-again Christian to deny her own homosexuality, while hypocritically shunning Tina for being bisexual and telling Tina that she was going to hell. After her sister moved to Texas and Tina moved to Los Angeles, California, they didn't speak again. Tina kept her abuse history secret from everyone, including Bette, and only confessed it to interrogating police officers after Jenny Schecter's (Mia Kirshner) death.

Prior to meeting Bette, with whom Tina had been in a relationship with for seven years at the time of the pilot of The L Word, the majority of her past relationships had been with men, along with Tina having two abortions in her early twenties.

Bette and Tina met when Tina's then-boyfriend Eric took her to the Bette Porter Gallery, where the two instantly became attracted to one another. Bette noticed Tina's right earring had fallen off. Despite the fact that Bette returned it to her, Tina left her earring at Bette's gallery so she could come back and get it later. Bette had kept it for her. While Tina was picking it from her hand, Bette kissed her. Shortly after, Tina left Eric to begin a relationship with Bette.

=== Season 1 ===
At the beginning of the first season, having been a couple for seven years, Tina and Bette are in the process searching for a sperm donor so that Tina can be artificially inseminated. After a successful insemination, Tina conceives, but suffers a miscarriage before she is even showing. This event is very traumatic for Tina, who finds comfort in working for a charity organization. Though she finds fulfilment there, her new career drives her further away from Bette. Bette then feeling more and more incapable to communicate with Tina, and starts an affair with carpenter Candace Jewell (Ion Overman). Tina eventually finds out, and in the ensuing fight, they have violent break-up sex. After that, Tina leaves Bette and moves with in Alice.

=== Season 2 ===
During the second season, Tina lives with Alice Pieszecki (Leisha Hailey), and decides to seek legal advice over her separation from Bette. Tina gets into contact with Joyce Wischnia (Jane Lynch), a gay civil rights lawyer who eventually makes a sexual pass at her. Tina then learns that Joyce is known in the lesbian community for sleeping with her clients, and ends their association. It is then revealed that Tina secretly inseminated herself before she learned of Bette's affair, and is now several months pregnant. She initially had kept it secret fearing another miscarriage and not wanting Bette to suffer again. Tina hides her expanding body with loose clothes.

After refusing Joyce's advances, Tina returns to live in her former house, sleeping in the guest room. She has dinner with Bette and plans to tell her then about the pregnancy, but that is derailed when Bette begins dominating the conversation with discussions of her work problems.

After her charity organisation is granted money from the Peabody Foundation, Tina begins a relationship with Helena Peabody (Rachel Shelley). Helena reveals Tina's pregnancy to Bette, and the two are shown as having a rivalry for Tina's affections. Helena's promiscuity and possessiveness, and Bette's changing and calmer attitude towards Tina, bring her back towards Bette who in turn is reaching out to her for comfort following over the death of her father, Melvin.

Though Tina experiences a difficult and traumatic labour, her daughter, Angelica "Angie" Porter-Kennard, is delivered safely, and at the end of the season it is revealed that she plans to move back in with Bette and raise their baby together.

=== Season 3 ===
The third season is set six months after Angie's birth, in which Tina and Bette are shown suffering more marital strife, including Bette losing her job at the CAC, and showing little interest in finding a new one. The couple appears to be more distant than ever; Bette seeks partner support from an overwhelmed Tina, who starts looking for the protection Bette cannot give her outside the home. Helena has just bought a movie studio, and offers Tina the chief development executive position.

Meanwhile, Tina tells Bette that she has rediscovered her attraction to men, and Bette tells her to explore those feelings. Their relationship become more and more difficult though, for Bette's difficulty to find a new job that might suit her and for a social worker who does not accept their life choices, and Tina - who has already had an online fling and also an attempt at fulfilling her interest with a male movie producer - meets Henry Young (Steven Eckholdt), a divorced man with one son, Mikey. While the problems with Bette keep growing, Tina seeing no future with Bette. She starts an affair and then a relationship with Henry. As Tina and Henry continue settling in, Bette decides to visit Joyce in order to obtain full custody of Angie. Later on, Bette decides to withdraw her sole custody petition, but the notification unfortunately reaches Joyce too late. After receiving Bette's letter, Tina decides to withdraw her consent for allowing Bette to become Angelica's other legal parent. At Shane McCutcheon's (Katherine Moennig) wedding, Bette attempts to reason with Tina, to no avail. The season ends with Tina discovering Angie is missing, having been kidnapped by Bette.

=== Season 4 ===
Bette returns with Angie after a short time away. Wischnia informs both her and Tina that a custody battle would become a media circus, which would be traumatic for Angie. Though relations are generally strained between them at the start of the season, things gradually improve between the pair and they agree on shared custody. Meanwhile, Alice and Jenny react negatively to Tina sleeping with men and using the "heterosexual privilege".

Tina acquires the rights to adapt Jenny Schecter's novel, Lez Girls, into a film. Work on Lez Girls strains her relationship with Jenny due to their conflicting opinions on how the piece should be adapted, and also leads Tina to meet Kate Arden (Annabella Sciorra), the selected director; it becomes apparent that there is a mutual attraction between the two.

Tina realizes that her relationship with Henry was just an escape and leaves him. She slowly renews her friendship with Bette and witnesses her enter a relationship with sculptor Jodi Lerner (Marlee Matlin). She subsequently realizes that she wants Bette back, but she decides to respect her feelings and helps her to get back with Jodi.

=== Season 5 ===
Tina repeatedly clashes with Jenny while producing Lez Girls. Shane and Alice try to be Tina's wingmen but Tina's love for Bette affects her dating prospects. Tina eventually meets a woman, Brenda, and sleeps with her on their first date. Bette finds out and expresses jealousy during a self-defense class, where in an exercise together Bette and Tina seem to harbor a still strong sexual tension.

Later that evening, they catch the other alone in a bar lounge. Bette kisses her and emotions overwhelm her, bringing Bette to cry in Tina's arms. They begin an affair, but they agree to keep it a secret until after the Subaru Pink Ride. The truth comes out, however: Jodi discovers during a game that Bette is having an affair with Tina. Bette then admits to her sister Kit that she loves Tina, while Tina also admits to Shane and Alice that she too still loves Bette. After unsuccessfully trying to convince Bette to stay with her, a spiteful Jodi publicly humiliates Bette by making her the mocked subject in her long-awaited exhibition. Tina comforts Bette who decides to let go, finding her soul mate in her, and they go together with all their friends to the Lez Girls' wrap party. Tina and Bette there show the intensity of their new relationship. At the end of the party Jenny, who has been excluded from the movie for her relationship with the star of the film, makes a surprise appearance.

=== Season 6 ===
Tina moves back in with Bette, and they decide to adopt a second child. In preparation, they begin to add an expensive extension to their house.

The pair go to Nevada, where they meet Marci (Katharine Isabelle), a young, pregnant single mother who is expecting a mixed-race son. She agrees to give Tina and Bette her child over the objections of her homophobic parents. Since Nevada law does not permit adoption to same-sex couples, Bette and Tina invite Marci to live in their house in LA during her pregnancy. At the last moment, however, Marci decides not to go.

Meanwhile, Tina's job at the studio is threatened when the Lez Girls negative is stolen. The tension with Aaron, who's convinced Jenny is behind the theft, brings Tina to leave her work. Also in this season, Bette meets her college crush Kelly Wentworth (Elizabeth Berkley), and the pair open an art gallery together.

Later on, while Tina is in New York for a job interview with Focus Features, Jenny looks up from her window and misreads Kelly's attempt to seduce Bette. She films a video that, viewed from the wrong angle, makes it seem as if they are having sex. Jenny then threatens to show the footage to Tina, unless Bette tells her what happened. Tina and Bette decide to move to New York so Tina can take the job; in a very intense moment they also decide to marry.

For their goodbye party in Los Angeles, Jenny prepares a video montage of several friends wishing them the best. Shortly afterwards, Jenny is found dead in Bette and Tina's pool. The series continuity ends with Tina and her friends being interrogated by police regarding Jenny's death.

=== The Interrogation Tapes ===
One day after the television series ends, footage of Tina's police interrogation appears on Showtime's L Word website ("The Interrogation Tapes"), during which she reveals certain elements of her early life such as her adulterous father and having been molested by her sister.

=== The L Word: Generation Q ===
By the time of Generation Q, set over 10 years after Jenny's death, Bette and Tina have separated again. Dialogue reveals that at some point, Bette and Tina eventually got married, but got divorced after Tina fell in love with another woman, Carrie. Bette is shown to have primary custody of a now-teenage Angie (Jordan Hull), who lives with her and refers to Tina as "Mama T".

In season one, after Bette comes into conflict with ex-lover Felicity Adams (Latarsha Adams), who seeks to sabotage her campaign for Mayor of Los Angeles, Tina returns to offer Bette emotional support after Angie calls her. After Bette gives a speech revealing her reason for running for mayor and determination not to drop out, Bette and Tina admit that they still care for each other, and share a hug, during which Bette asks Tina not to leave.

Later, Tina meets up with Bette and Shane at Shane's new gay bar, "Dana's", where Tina asks Bette to dinner. The two meet up at Bette's house, where Tina reveals that she is moving to Los Angeles in order to be closer to Angie. Though Bette hopes to renew their relationship, Tina reveals that she is actually looking for a place for herself and Carrie, whom she is going to marry, and that she wants to tell Angie along with Bette and Carrie. Though devastated by the news, Bette gives Tina her blessing. In the season finale, both Bette and Angie accept that Tina is not coming back, and Bette goes on a dinner date with a reporter from her mayoral campaign, moving on from Tina.

In season two, both Tina and Carrie are drawn further into Bette and Angie's lives when Angie does some more background information about her biological father, Bette's friend and sperm donor Marcus Allenwood (Mark Berry), and learns that she has a half-sister, Kayla. Marcus is dying of kidney failure and wants to see if she is a suitable donor for a transplant. The strong bond between Tina and Bette, coping together with accepting Angie's wishes, becomes very visible to Carrie. She starts to have serious doubts about her marriage to Tina, and talks about them with Shane, after a disastrous 'family' poker game, where Bette dismisses Carrie's attempts to become friends. Tina gets to know what happened and, while visiting Marcus in the hospital, asks Bette directly if she is still in love with her. Before Bette can answer, however, Marcus dies, leaving her too mired in grief and shock to continue their conversation.

Shane decides to talk to Bette about Carrie's cold feet about the marriage with Tina, encouraging her friend to face her feelings for her ex-wife. At Alice's celebration party for her new autobiography, Bette tries to be honest with Tina. Carrie overhears their conversation and calls off the wedding despite Bette's attempts to apologize. Tina accuses her of sabotaging her relationship with Carrie. Later, though just as Bette is leaving to join Pippa Pascal at her new art exhibition, Tina appears at her doorstep, asking to come in.

In season three, picking up directly from the end of the second season, Tina asks Bette again if she is still in love with her. Bette finally confesses that she is, and Tina says that she also still loves Bette, but accuses Bette of not being able to show her love properly and leaves.

A year later, however, Tina is once again on good terms with Bette, though the circumstances of Tina forgiving Bette again are left unrevealed. They meet to drop off Angie at college together, and then in the evening at a benefit event organized by Shane, a gesture by Tina, gets them to talk openly about their relationship and reconnect sexually. They both seem willing to start a relationship again, but during the opening of Marcus Allenwood's exposition, Bette asks Tina not to return to Toronto; the producer leaves, afraid they will repeat their past mistakes. Bette, after talking with Shane and Alice, reaches Tina on the way to the airport, and tells her to be ready to leave everything behind to be together. She asks her ex-wife to go together in Canada, and Tina accepts.

They return to LA some time later to assist to a public reading by Angie's class at college. During the event, they find out that Angie is sleeping with her professor and tell her to break it off, but Angie refuses, seeing their concern as an intrusion.

At the end of the evening, Bette and Tina, who individually were planning to propose, decide to marry again. The series ends with the day of their marriage: it happens to be full of accidents, but it culminates in a heartfelt ceremony.

== The Chart ==
Tina's chart as of episode 4.02:Livin' La Vida Loca. Pink represents lead female characters; light blue and navy blue represent secondary female and male characters, respectively.
