= Laurel Holloman =

American painter and actress

- Education: University of North Carolina
- Occupations: Painter, actress
- Years active: 1994–present
- Spouse: Paul Macherey (m. 2002; div. 2012)
- Children: 2

Laurel Lisa Holloman is a Canadian and American painter and actress. She is best known for playing Tina Kennard in The L Word.

== Early life ==
Holloman is the youngest child in her family. She has two older brothers. She graduated from Saint Mary's School, an Episcopal boarding school for girls in Raleigh, in 1986. She attended the University of North Carolina where she graduated with a degree in Performance Communication. She appeared in numerous theater productions in Chapel Hill and Raleigh, as well as in Chicago and London. She studied painting and sculpting at UCLA and at The San Francisco Art Institute.

== Career ==
=== Acting ===
After graduating from UNC, Holloman moved to Chicago to work with the Piven Theatre Workshop. She studied with John Lynn in Los Angeles, and was cast in David Orr's independent feature Blossom Time. She moved to New York City in early 1994 and appeared in stage productions such as Tennessee Williams' The Glass Menagerie, Carson McCullers' The Heart Is a Lonely Hunter at the Theatre for the New City. Holloman also performed off-Broadway in Julia Jordan's Night Swim at Playwright's Horizons.

In 1995, Holloman began her film career with her role as Randy Dean in The Incredibly True Adventure of Two Girls in Love. She worked steadily in a variety of mostly independent film roles, such as The Myth of Fingerprints, Boogie Nights and Tumbleweeds.

Though she retired from acting to pursue a career in painting, she returned to reprise the role of the series' follow-up, The L Word: Generation Q.

=== Painting ===
After her acting career, Holloman spent her time painting in Los Angeles. Her paintings were influenced by Mark Rothko, with vibrant use of color and large scale pieces, as well as elements of three dimensional effect. Although mostly abstract, Holloman's paintings betray a distinctly literary spirituality. She received favorable reviews for Free Falling.

Holloman's painting, "Swell", was chosen to be part of the group show entitled "Nell' Acqua Capisco" at the Venice Biennale, 2013. She won 1st Place in Discipline Painting at the 2014 Contemporary Art Biennale of Argentina. Holloman had two entries in the 2015 Florence Biennale and won a prize for "Into the Woods". In November 2015 she had a solo show at the Menier Gallery in London titled "The Innocents". Holloman's first solo museum show entitled "Everglow" was held in Amstelveen, Netherlands from July 2016 through August 2016 in the Museum Jan Van der Togt.

== Personal life ==
Holloman married architect Paul Macherey on July 13, 2002. They have a daughter, Lola Reiko Macherey. They adopted a second daughter, Nala Belle (meaning 'beautiful gift'). In 2011, Holloman filed for divorce, which was finalized on June 18, 2012.

== Exhibitions ==
=== Solo exhibitions ===
2017

- Fertile Ground, Bankside Gallery, London

2016

- Everglow, Museum Jan van der Togt, Amstelveen

2015

- The Innocents, Mernier Gallery, London

2014

- The Fifth Element, Galerie Joseph, Paris

2013

- All the World Inside, Palazzo Italia, Berlin

2012

- Free Falling, Ateneo of Venice, Venice
- Coeur Libre, Pantheon Town Hall, Paris.

== Filmography ==
=== Film ===
Year	Title	Role	Notes
1995	The Price of Love	Roxanne	Television film
1995	The Incredibly True Adventure of Two Girls in Love	Randy Dean	
1996	Blossom Time	Francis Bodean	
1996	Dalva	Karen	Television film
1997	Boogie Nights	Sheryl Lynn	
1997	The Myth of Fingerprints	Leigh	
1997	Dying to Belong	Shannon	Television film
1997	Prefontaine	Elaine Finley	
1997	The Clearing	—N/a	Short film
1997	The First to Go	Carrie	
1998	Stamp and Deliver	—N/a	
1999	Cherry	Evy Sweet	
1999	Chapter Zero	Jane	
1999	Loving Jezebel	Samantha	
1999	Tumbleweeds	Lauri	
1999	Loser Love	Lily Delacroix	
1999	Tide	Lilly	Short film
1999	Lush	Ashley 'Ash' Van Dyke	
2000	Committed	Adelle	
2001	Morning	Shelly	
2001	Popcorn Shrimp	Cop #1	Short film
2001	Last Ball	Cathy	
2001	The Rising Place	Emily Hodge	
2001	Liberty, Maine	—N/a	
2002	Alone	Charlotte	

=== Television ===
Year	Title	Role	Notes
1997	Cracker: Mind Over Murder	Carol	Episode: "True Romance: Part 1"
2001	That's Life	Karen Matlin	3 episodes
2001–2002	Angel	Justine Cooper	8 episodes
2003	Without a Trace	Joan Wilson	Episode: "Underground Railroad"
2004–2009	The L Word	Tina Kennard	main role (70 episodes); Satellite Award for Best Actress – Television Series Drama
2009	Castle	Sandy Allen	Episode: "Deep in Death"
2010	Gigantic	RaeAnne Colvin	4 episodes
2020–2023	The L Word: Generation Q	Tina Kennard	10 episodes
