= List of programs broadcast by ABC Television (Australian TV network) =

This is a list of television programmes that are currently being broadcast or have been broadcast on ABC Television's ABC TV (formerly ABC1), ABC Family (formerly ABC2, ABC Comedy and ABC TV Plus), ABC Kids (formerly ABC 4 Kids), ABC Entertains (formerly ABC3 and ABC Me) or ABC News (formerly ABC News 24) in Australia.

== Current programming ==
=== Domestic ===
==== News and current affairs ====
- Local productions
  - ABC News 7pm weeknights in NSW/ACT/QLD/VIC/SA/NT/WA/TAS (1956–present)
- National programs produced in Sydney
  - 7.30 (1986–present)
  - ABC News Mornings (2010–present on ABC and ABC News)
  - ABC News at Noon (2005–present on ABC and ABC News)
  - ABC News Afternoons (2010–present on ABC News)
  - ABC Late News (2018–present)
  - Afternoon Briefing (2018–present)
  - Australian Story (1996–present)
  - The Business (2006–present)
  - Foreign Correspondent (1992–present)
  - Four Corners (1961–present)
  - Planet America (2012–2013, 2016–present)
  - Weekend Breakfast (2012–present)
- National programs produced in Melbourne
  - ABC News at Five (2012–present)
  - News Breakfast (2008–2011 on ABC2, 2011–present on ABC)
  - The World (2010–present)
- National programs produced in Canberra
  - Insiders (2001–present)

==== Drama ====
- Bay of Fires (2023)
- Fires (2021–present)
- Goodwood (2022)
- Harrow (2018–present)
- The Heights (2019–present)
- House of Gods (2024)
- In Limbo (2023) (comedy drama)
- In Our Blood (2023)
- Ladies in Black (2024)
- The Messenger (2023)
- Mystery Road (2018–present)
- The Newsreader (2021–present)
- Savage River (2022–present)
- Significant Others (2022–present)
- Troppo (2022–present)

==== Comedy ====
- Austin (2024–present)
- Aunty Donna's Coffee Cafe (2023)
- Australian Epic (2023–present)
- Black Comedy (2014–present)
- Content (2019–present on iView)
- Fisk (2021–present)
- Frayed (2019–present)
- Gold Diggers (2023)
- Guy Montgomery's Guy Mont-Spelling Bee (2024–present)
- Mother and Son (comedy, 1984–1994, 2023–)
- Preppers (2021–present)
- Question Everything (2021–present)
- Summer Love (2022–present)
- Tomorrow Tonight (2018, 2022–present)
- Utopia (2014–present)
- WTFAQ (2023–present)

==== Entertainment ====
- Anh's Brush with Fame (2016–present)
- Back in Time for Dinner (2018–present)
- Back in Time for the Corner Shop (2023)
- Gruen (2008–present)
- Hard Quiz (2016–present)
- I Was Actually There (2024–present)
- Julia Zemiro's Home Delivery (2013–present)
- Just Between Us: There’s Something I Want To Tell You (2021–present)
- Kitchen Cabinet (entertainment 2012–2016, 2023)
- Take 5 with Zan Rowe (2022–present)
- The Weekly with Charlie Pickering (2015–present)
- You Can't Ask That (2016–present)

==== Documentary ====
- Australia Remastered (2020–present)
- Australia's Wild Odyssey (2023)
- Ask the Doctor (2017–present)
- The Assembly (2024–present)
- A Dog's World (2022–present)
- Back to Nature (2021–present)
- Back Roads (2015–present)
- Better Date Than Never (2023)
- Beyond the Towers (2021–present)
- Big Deal (2021)
- The Black Hand (2023)
- Books that Made Us (2021–present)
- Catalyst (2001–present)
- Compass (1988–present)
- The Cult of the Family (2019)
- Decoding Danger (2021)
- Designing A Legacy (2021–present)
- Employable Me (2018–present)
- First Weapons (2023)
- Gardening Australia (1990–present)
- Grand Designs Australia
- Great Australian Stuff (2023)
- Headliners (2024)
- Inside the Sydney Opera House (2022–present)
- Magical Land of Oz (2019–present)
- Media Watch (1989–2000, 2002–present)
- Meet the Penguins (2022–present)
- Movin' to the Country (2021–present)
- Muster Dogs (2022–present)
- New Leash on Life (2023)
- Ningaloo Nyinggulu (2023)
- Old People's Home for 4 Year Olds (2019–present)
- Old People's Home for Teenagers (2022–present)
- Outback Ringer (2020–present)
- The People's Republic of Mallacoota (2021–present)
- Queerstralia (2023)
- The Recording Studio (2019–present)
- Restoration Australia (2015, 2019–present)
- The School That Tried to End Racism (2021–present)
- Southern Ocean Live (2022–present)
- Stargazing Live (2017–present)
- War on Waste (2017–present)

==== Arts ====
- Art Works (2021–2023)
- The Art Of (2024–present)
- Creative Types with Virginia Trioli (2024–present)

==== Children's programs on ABC Family/Entertains ====
- 100% Wolf: Legend of the Moonstone (2020–present)
- Behind the News (Classroom: 1969–2003, 2005–2014 on ABC TV, 2014–present on ABC Entertains; Newsbreak, 2009–2024 on ABC Entertains, 2024–present on ABC Family)
- Big Blue (2022–present)
- Born to Spy (2021–present)
- Built to Survive (2022–present)
- Cartoon It Up (2016–present on ABC Me)
- Crazy Fun Park (2023)
- Create (2017–present on ABC ME)
- Definitely Not News (2020–present)
- First Day (2020–present)
- Good Game: Spawn Point (2010–present on ABC Me)
- Hardball (2019–present)
- Hard Quiz Kids (2024–present)
- Itch (2020–present)
- MaveriX (2022–present)
- Mikki vs The World (2021–present)
- Mustangs FC (2017–present)
- The PM's Daughter (2022–present)
- Reef School (2023–present)
- Space Nova (2021)
- Spongo, Fuzz and Jalapeña (2019–present)
- The Disposables (children's, 2023)
- The Strange Chores (2019–present on ABC Entertains)
- The InBESTigators (2019–present on ABC Me)
- The New Legends of Monkey (2018–present)
- Thalu (2020 on ABC ME)
- Turn Up The Volume (2023–present)
- Wildlifers! (2023–present)

==== Preschool programs on ABC Kids ====
- Bluey (2018–present)
- Beep and Mort (2022–present)
- Get Grubby TV (2014–present)
- Gardening Australia Junior (2023)
- Ginger & the Vegesaurus (2022–present)
- Hoot Hoot Go! (2016–present on ABC Kids)
- Kangaroo Beach (2021–present)
- Kazoops! (2016–present)
- Little J & Big Cuz (2019–present on ABC Kids)
- Play School (1966–present on ABC Kids)
- Pencil Pals (2020–present)
- Ready, Steady, Wiggle!
- Wiggle, Wiggle Wiggle!
- The Wonder Gang

==== Music ====
- Rage (1987–present; 2024–present on ABC Entertains)
- The Set (2018–present)
- The Sound (2020)
- Spicks and Specks (2005–2011, 2014, 2013, 2021–present)

==== Sports talk ====
- Offsiders (2006–present)
- That Pacific Sport Show (2020–present)

==== Sport ====
- Golf: Women's Australian Open, Australian Ladies Masters
- Basketball: Women's National Basketball League

==== Annual events ====
- Australian of the Year Awards
- Melbourne International Comedy Festival specials (1998–2016 on Ten, 2017–present on ABC)
- Royal Edinburgh Military Tattoo
- Sydney Gay and Lesbian Mardi Gras (1994–1997, 2022–present)
- Sydney New Year's Eve Fireworks (1995–2005 on Nine, 2006–2008 on Ten, 2009–2012 on Nine, 2013–present on ABC)
- Tropfest (previously on Nine, 2007–2010 on Movie Extra, 2011–2013 on SBS, 2014–2016 on SBS2, 2017 on Eleven, 2018–present on ABC Comedy)

==== Other ====
- National Press Club Address
- Question Time

=== Foreign ===
==== Animation ====
- Archer
- The Legend of Korra
- Wallace and Gromit (during Easter and Christmas)

==== Anime ====
- Boruto: Naruto Next Generations
- Dragon Ball Super
- Fruits Basket (2019)
- Log Horizon
- Radiant
- Sailor Moon Crystal

==== Drama ====
- All Creatures Great and Small (originally aired on BritBox)
- At Home with the Braithwaites
- Beautiful People
- Blue Water Empire
- Class (Doctor Who spinoff)
- Death in Paradise
- Doctor Who
- ER (2024–present on ABC Entertains)
- The Larkins
- Life
- Starstruck
- The Teacher
- War of the Worlds (originally aired on Foxtel)

==== Comedy ====
- Absolutely Fabulous
- Ackley Bridge
- At Home with the Braithwaites
- Catastrophe
- The Catherine Tate Show
- The Cleaner (2024 on ABC Entertains)
- Death in Paradise
- Live at The Apollo
- Mock the Week
- My Family (repeats; 2024–present on ABC Entertains)
- Portlandia (2024–present on ABC Entertains)
- Red Dwarf
- Whose Line Is It Anyway?
- Would I Lie to You? (2012–present; 2024–present on ABC Entertains)
- Young Sheldon

==== Entertainment ====
- Alan Carr: Chatty Man
- Car SOS (2024–present on ABC Entertains)
- MythBusters (2024–present on ABC Entertains and ABC Family)
- Penn and Teller: Fool Us (2011–present; 2024–present on ABC Entertains)
- The Tonight Show Starring Jimmy Fallon

==== Documentary ====
- David Attenborough Specials (Shared with Nine Network and Network 10)

==== Lifestyle ====
- George Clarke's Amazing Spaces
- Grand Designs
- Grand Designs New Zealand

==== Other ====
- Doc Martin
- Heart and Soul
- Hope Springs
- How Not to Live Your Life
- The Jonathan Ross Show
- The Last Leg
- Midsomer Murders
- Never Mind the Buzzcocks
- Parkinson
- Silent Witness
- Songs of Praise

==== Children's ====
- 72 Cutest Animals
- ABC Singsong
- According to Kids
- The Adventures of Paddington
- The Adventures of Puss in Boots
- All Hail King Julien
- Almost Naked Animals
- Alphablocks
- Aliens Love Underpants And...
- Ali-A's Superchargers
- Alva's World
- Andy's Dinosaur Adventures
- Andy's Safari Adventures
- Andy's Wild Workouts
- Ariel
- Arthur (acquired from PBS Kids)
- Athleticus
- Baby Jake
- The Bagel and Becky Show
- The Beachbuds
- Becca's Bunch
- The Beet Party
- Ben & Holly's Little Kingdom
- Best Bugs Forever
- Bing
- Big Block SingSong
- Big Blue
- Big Words Small Stories
- Bob the Builder (2015 series)
- Book Hungry Bears
- Bottersnikes and Gumbles (originally aired on Seven)
- Brave Bunnies (later moved to Cartoon Network)
- Buddi
- Camp Lakebottom
- Chuggington
- Clangers (2015 series)
- Cleopatra in Space
- Cloudy with a Chance of Meatballs
- Danger Mouse
- Daniel Tiger's Neighborhood (acquired from PBS Kids)
- The Day Henry Met
- The Day My Butt Went Psycho! (originally aired on Nine)
- Deadly 60
- The Deep (originally aired on Seven)
- Degrassi: The Next Generation
- The Dengineers
- Dennis & Gnasher: Unleashed!
- Digby Dragon
- Dinosaur Train (originally aired on Eleven)
- Dinotrux
- Dino Dana
- Dogstar (originally aired on Nine)
- Dog Loves Books
- Dorg Van Dango
- Dot.
- The Drawing Show
- DreamWorks Dragons
- Droners
- Dwight in Shining Armor
- Emma!
- I, Elvis Riboldi
- Endangered Species
- The Fairly OddParents
- Find Me in Paris
- Floogals
- FriendZSpace
- The Furchester Hotel
- Get Blake!
- Go Jetters
- Grace's Amazing Machines
- Gym Stars
- Hanazuki: Full of Treasures
- Hey Duggee
- The Hive
- Hoopla Doopla!
- Horrible Histories (2015 series)
- In the Night Garden...
- I'm a Creepy Crawly
- I'm a Fish
- Keeko
- Kiddets
- Kiri and Lou
- Kong: King of the Apes
- Kung Fu Panda: Legends of Awesomeness
- Kuu Kuu Harajuku (originally aired on Eleven)
- Lah-Lah's Adventures
- Larry the Wonderpup (originally aired on Seven)
- League of Super Evil
- Learning Time with Timmy
- The Legend of Korra
- Lily's Driftwood Bay
- Little Princess
- Little Big Awesome
- Little Roy
- Love Monster
- Luo Bao Bei
- MathXplosion
- Malory Towers
- Massive Monster Mayhem
- Matilda and the Ramsay Bunch
- Mecha Builders
- Miffy's Adventures Big and Small
- Mighty Mike
- Miraculous: Tales of Ladybug and Cat Noir
- Mister Maker
- Mister Maker Around the World
- Mister Maker's Arty Party
- Molly of Denali
- Molly and Mack
- Moon and Me
- Moka's Fabulous Adventures
- Mystery Lane
- Nella the Princess Knight
- Nerds and Monsters
- The Next Step
- Noddy, Toyland Detective (acquired from DreamWorks channel)
- Numberblocks
- Numb Chucks
- The Numtums
- Octonauts
- Odd Squad
- Oddbods
- Olobob Top
- Operation Ouch!
- Pablo
- The Penguins of Madagascar (originally aired on Ten)
- Peppa Pig
- Pet Superstars
- Peter Rabbit
- Pfffirates
- Pingu in the City (acquired from Boomerang)
- Pip and Posy
- PJ Masks
- Pocoyo
- Rainbow Chicks
- Rastamouse
- Rated A for Awesome
- Ready Jet Go!
- Remy & Boo
- Rise of the Teenage Mutant Ninja Turtles
- Rita and Crocodile
- Robot Wars
- Roy
- The Rubbish World of Dave Spud
- Rusty Rivets
- Sadie Sparks
- Sarah & Duck
- School of Rock
- Scooby-Doo and Guess Who?
- Scream Street
- Secret Life of Boys
- Shaun the Sheep
- SheZow
- Sir Mouse
- Slugterra
- Spirit Riding Free
- Small Potatoes (2011 series)
- So Awkward
- Star Wars: Young Jedi Adventures
- storyTree
- Super Dinosaur
- Supernoobs
- Teenage Mutant Ninja Turtles (2012 series)
- Teen Titans Go!
- Teletubbies
- This is Scarlett and Isaiah
- Thomas & Friends (original Series) (acquired from CBeebies)
- Thomas & Friends: All Engines Go!
- Thunderbirds Are Go
- Timmy Time
- Tik Tak
- Tish Tash
- Total DramaRama
- Transformers: Earthspark
- Twirlywoos
- Voltron: Legendary Defender
- Wallykazam!
- The Wacky Word Show
- Waffle the Wonder Dog
- Wanda and The Alien
- Wishfart
- The Zoo
- Zack and Quack

== Upcoming programming ==
=== 2026 ===
==== Domestic (Scripted) ====
- Dustfall (Drama)
- Goolagong (Bio mini-series)
- Shakedown (Drama)
- Treasure & Dirt (Mystery Drama)
- Ground Up (Sports Comedy)
- Bad Company (Comedy)
- Dog Park (Comedy)

==== Domestic (Documentary) ====
- Ages of Ice (Film)
- But Also John Clarke (Special)
- Judgment: Cases that Changed Australia (Series)
- Rolf Harris: Can You Tell What I Am Yet? (Two-part series)
- Shaun Micallef’s Going for Broke (Series)
- Tampa: The Boat that Turned the Tide (Series)
- The Matter of Facts (Series)
- The State of Man (Series)
- Todd Sampson’s Why? (Series)

==== Domestic (Kids and Family) ====
- Flower & Flour (Animated series)

== Previous programming ==
=== Domestic ===
==== News and current affairs ====
- 7 Days (2001–2005)
- Asia Pacific Focus (2001–2014)
- Australia Wide (2005–2017)
- Business Breakfast (2002–2003)
- The Carleton-Walsh Report (1985–1987)
- Difference of Opinion (2007)
- The Drum (2010–2023)
- FAQ (1999–2000)
- First Edition (1993–1996)
- George Negus Tonight (2001–2004)
- Inside Business (2002–2013)
- The Investigators (1985–1995)
- Lateline (1990–2017)
- Lateline Business (2006–2010)
- The Link (2017)
- Matter of Fact with Stan Grant (2018)
- The National (1985)
- Nationwide (1979–1984)
- Open Hearing (1960–1961)
- One Plus One (2013–2023)
- Stateline (1996–2011)
- This Day Tonight (1967–1978)
- Weekend Magazine

==== Drama ====
- 1915 (1982)
- A Difficult Woman (1998)
- Adventures of the Seaspray (1967)
- All the Green Year (1980)
- An Accidental Soldier (2013)
- And Here Comes Bucknuckle (1981)
- Answered by Fire (2006)
- ANZAC Girls (2014)
- Australian Playhouse (1966–1967)
- Barons (2022)
- Bastard Boys (2007)
- Beat of the City (1975)
- The Beautiful Lie (2015)
- Bed of Roses (2008–2011)
- Bellbird (1967–1977)
- Ben Hall (1975)
- Blue Murder (1995)
- Brides of Christ (1991, later moved to Ten)
- The Broken Shore (2014)
- Captain James Cook (1987)
- Carlotta (2014)
- Cassidy (1989)
- Catspaw (1978)
- Certain Women (1973–1976)
- Changi (2001)
- Children's Hospital (1997–1998)
- Cleverman (2016–2017)
- Cliffy (2013)
- The Code (2014–2016)
- Come In Spinner (1990)
- Correlli (1995)
- Crownies (2011)
- The Cry (2019) (co-production with BBC)
- Curtin (2007)
- The Cut (2009)
- The Damnation of Harvey McHugh (1994)
- Dancing Daze (1986)
- Dangerous Remedy (2012)
- Devil's Dust (2012)
- Diary of an Uber Driver (2019)
- Dirt Game (2009)
- The Doctor Blake Mysteries (2013–2017, moved to Seven Network)
- East of Everything (2008–2009)
- Edens Lost (1989)
- Embassy (1990–1992)
- The Eternity Man (2009) (co-production with Channel 4)
- Fallen Angels (1997)
- The Farm (2001)
- Fireflies (2004)
- The Gods of Wheat Street (2014)
- Golden Soak (1979)
- G.P. (1989–1996)
- Grass Roots (2000–2003)
- Head Start (2001)
- Heartland (1994)
- Hell Has Harbour Views (2005)
- Here Out West (2022)
- Hiding (2015)
- House Rules (1988)
- The Hungry Ones (1963)
- I Can Jump Puddles (1981)
- Jack Irish (2012–2021)
- Janet King (2014–2017)
- Janus (1994–1995)
- Kirby's Company (1977)
- The Last Resort (1988–1989)
- The Leaving of Liverpool (1992) (co-production with BBC)
- Les Norton (2019)
- Lessons from the Grave (2013–2014)
- Love is a Four Letter Word (2001)
- Mabo (2012)
- Marking Time (2003)
- Marriage Acts (2001)
- MDA (2002–2005)
- Menzies and Churchill at War (2008)
- Mercury (1996)
- Miss Fisher's Murder Mysteries (2012–2015)
- My Brother Jack (1965, 2001 series later went to air on Ten)
- Newton's Law (2017)
- Old School (2014)
- The Oracle (1979)
- The Outcasts (1961)
- The Outsiders (1976–1977)
- Paper Giants: The Birth of Cleo (2011)
- Paper Giants: Magazine Wars (2013)
- The Patriots (1962)
- Patrol Boat (1979–1983, later moved to Ten)
- Phoenix (1992–1993)
- Pig in a Poke (1977)
- Pine Gap (2018) (co-production with Netflix)
- Police Rescue (1989–1996)
- Power Without Glory (1976)
- The Prime Minister is Missing (2008)
- Pulse (2017)
- The Purple Jacaranda (1964)
- Rain Shadow (2007)
- Rake (2010–2018)
- Raw FM (1997–1998)
- Redfern Now (2012–2015)
- Ride on Stranger (1979)
- Riot (2018)
- The River Kings (1991)
- The Road from Coorain (2002)
- Robbery Under Arms (1985)
- Rush (1974–1976)
- Scales of Justice (1983)
- SeaChange (1998–2000)
- Secret Bridesmaids' Business (2002)
- The Secret River (2015)
- Serangoon Road (2013) (co-production with HBO Asia)
- Serpent in the Rainbow (1973)
- Seven Deadly Sins (1993)
- Seven Types of Ambiguity (2017)
- The Shark Net (2003)
- Shark's Paradise (1986)
- The Silence (2006)
- Silly Season Cinema (1982)
- Sisters of War (2010)
- The Slap (2011)
- Something in the Air (2000–2002)
- Stark (1993) (co-production with BBC)
- Stateless (2020)
- Stormy Petrel (1960)
- The Straits (2012)
- Studio 86 (1986)
- Sweet and Sour (1984)
- The Sweet Sad Story of Elmo and Me (1965)
- A Taste for Blue Ribbons (1973)
- The Time of Our Lives (2013–2014)
- The Timeless Land (1980)
- Top Mates (1979)
- Total Control (2019–2024)
- The Truckies (1978)
- Vacancy in Vaughn Street (1963)
- Valentine's Day (2008)
- The Valley Between (1996)
- Wildside (1997–1999)
- The Willow Bend Mystery (1983)

==== Comedy / Entertainment ====
- 8MMM Aboriginal Radio (2015)
- Aaron Chen Tonight (2017 on ABC2)
- The ABC of (2022–2023)
- Adam Hills Tonight (2011–2013)
- The Adventures of Lano and Woodley (1997–1999)
- The Agony Of... (2012–2015)
- Alvin Purple (1976)
- All My Friends Are Racist (2021)
- American College Football (1991–1996)
- A Moody Christmas (2012)
- Angry Boys (2011) (co-production with HBO)
- The Annette Klooger Show (1959–1961)
- At Home with Julia (2011)
- Audrey's Kitchen (2012–2013)
- The Aunty Jack Show (1972–1973)
- Australia You're Standing In It (1983–1984)
- BackBerner (1999–2002)
- Back Seat Drivers (2014 on ABC2)
- Bad Cop, Bad Cop (2003–2003)
- Ballzup! (1994)
- Beached Az (2009–2010)
- Beginners, Please (1961)
- Bentley's Bandbox (1960)
- Between Ourselves (1963)
- Blah Blah Blah (1988)
- The Big Gig (1989–1991)
- The Bryan Davies Show (1962–1963)
- Cafe Continental (1958–1961)
- The Chaser Decides (2004, 2007)
- Chaser News Alert (2005 on ABC2)
- The Chaser's Election Desk (2016)
- The Chaser's Media Circus (2014–2015)
- The Chaser's War on Everything (2006–2009)
- The Checkout (2013–2018)
- Clarke & Dawe (2000–2017)
- Club Buggery (1995–1997)
- CNNNN (2002–2003)
- Comedy Next Gen (2016–2018 on ABC Comedy)
- Comedy Showroom (2016)
- Comedy Up Late (2013–2018 on ABC Comedy)
- Corridors of Power (2001)
- Couchman (1989–1992)
- Country Style (1958)
- DAAS Kapital (1991–1992)
- Da Kath & Kim Code (2005)
- Dearest Enemy (1989)
- The D Generation (1986–1987, moved to Seven 1988–1989)
- The Dingo Principle (1987)
- Dirty Laundry Live (2013–2014 on ABC2, 2015 on ABC)
- The Divorce (2015)
- Dog's Head Bay (1999)
- Double the Fist (2004, 2008)
- Eagle & Evans (2004)
- The Edge of The Bush (2017)
- The Einstein Factor (2004–2009)
- Eggshells (1991–1993)
- The Election Chaser (2001)
- The Elegant Gentleman's Guide to Knife Fighting (2013)
- Enough Rope with Andrew Denton (2003–2008)
- Escape from the City (2019– 2020)
- The Evie Hayes Show (1960)
- The Ex-PM (2015, 2017)
- Fancy Boy (2016 on ABC2)
- The Fast Lane (1985, 1987)
- The Fat (2000–2003)
- Fiesta (1958)
- Find the Link (1957–1958)
- Flashback (1983)
- Flashback (2000)
- Flipside (2002)
- Frontline (1994–1997)
- Funky Squad (1995)
- The Games (1998–2000)
- The Garry McDonald Show (1977)
- The Gerry Connolly Show (1988)
- Get Krack!n (2017–2019)
- Gillies and Company (1992)
- The Gillies Report (1984–1985)
- The Gillies Republic (1986)
- The Glass House (2001–2006)
- Good News Week (1996–1998, moved to Ten 1998–2000, 2008–2012)
- Good News Weekend (1998)
- Growing Up Gracefully (2017)
- Hack Live (2015–2017 on ABC2)
- Hal Lashwood's Alabama Jubilee (1958–1961)
- The Hamster Decides (2013)
- The Hamster Wheel (2011–2012)
- Head 2 Head (2006)
- Here Come the Girls (1960)
- The Hollowmen (2008)
- Home Sweet Home (1980–1982)
- Homeward Bound (1958)
- The House with Annabel Crabb (2017)
- House Rules (1988)
- How Not to Behave (2015)
- I Rock (2010 on ABC2)
- In Harmer's Way (1990–1992)
- The Inventors (1970–1982)
- It's A Date (2013–2014)
- Ja'mie: Private School Girl (2013) (co-production with HBO)
- The Johnny Gredula Show (1957–1958)
- John Conway Tonight (2017 on ABC2)
- John Hinde Presents (1989–1999)
- John Safran's Race Relations (2009)
- Jonah from Tonga (2014)
- Judith Lucy Is All Woman (2015)
- Judith Lucy's Spiritual Journey (2011)
- The Katering Show (2016)
- Kath & Kim (2002–2005 on ABC, 2007 on Seven)
- Kittson Fahey (1992–1993)
- Laid (2011–2012)
- The Late Show (1992–1993)
- Lawrence Leung's Choose Your Own Adventure (2009)
- Lawrence Leung's Unbelievable (2011)
- The Letdown (2016–2019)
- The Librarians (2007–2010)
- Live and Sweaty (1991–1995)
- The Lorrae Desmond Show (1960–1964)
- Lowdown (2010–2012)
- Luke Warm Sex (2016)
- Mastermind (1978–1984)
- Maximum Choppage (2015 on ABC2)
- The Memphis Trousers Half Hour (2005)
- Men at the Top (1959)
- The Micallef P(r)ogram(me) (1998–2001)
- The Mix (2014–2021)
- The Moodys (2014)
- The Money or the Gun (1989–1990)
- Myf Warhurst's Nice (2012)
- The NYE Pub Quiz (2014–2016)
- News Free Zone (1985)
- The Norman Gunston Show (1975–1976 on ABC, moved to Seven 1978–1979, 1981 and 1993)
- O'Loghlin on Saturday Night (1999)
- One Size Fits All (2000)
- Outland (2012)
- The Oz Game (1988–1989)
- Quest (1976–1978)
- Problems (2012)
- Randling (2012)
- Reality Check (2014)
- Review with Myles Barlow (2008–2010 on ABC2)
- The Roast (2012–2014 on ABC2)
- Ronny Chieng: International Student (2017)
- Rosehaven (2016–2021)
- Rubbery Figures (1987–1990)
- Sammy J & Randy in Ricketts Lane (2015)
- Sammy J's Playground Politics (2016 on iView)
- Sammy J's Democratic Party (2017)
- Sando (2018)
- The Saturday Show (1959)
- Shaun Micallef's Mad as Hell (2012–2022)
- Seeing Stars (1957–1959)
- Shock, Horror, Aunty! (2013)
- Short Cuts to Glory: Matt Okine (2017)
- Sideliners (2017)
- The Sideshow (2007)
- The Simon Gallaher Show (1982–1983)
- Sleuth 101 (2010)
- Soul Mates (2014 on ABC2)
- Sport in Question (1986)
- Squinters (2018)
- Story Club (2015 on ABC2)
- The Strange Calls (2012 on ABC2)
- Strictly Dancing (2004–2005)
- Summer Heights High (2007)
- Superwog (2018 on ABC Comedy)
- Theatre Sports (1987)
- Think Tank (2018)
- This is Littleton (2014 on ABC2)
- Timothy (2014)
- Tonightly with Tom Ballard (2017–2018 on ABC Comedy)
- Tractor Monkeys (2013)
- The Trophy Room (2010)
- Twentysomething (2011–2013)
- Two's Company (1959–1961)
- Upper Middle Bogan (2013–2016)
- The Urban Monkey with Murray Foote (2009)
- Variety View (1958–1959)
- Very Small Business / Back in Very Small Business (2008, 2018)
- Vikki (1963)
- The Warriors (2017)
- We Can Be Heroes: Finding The Australian of the Year (2005)
- Wednesday Night Fever (2013)
- Welcher & Welcher (2003)
- Wham Bam Thank You Ma'am (2016 on ABC2)
- What Next (1958–1959)
- Whovians (2017–2020 on ABC2)
- Win the Week (2021–2022)
- Wollongong the Brave (1975)
- Woodley (2012)
- Would You Believe? (1970–1974)
- Yes We Canberra! (2010)

==== Documentary / Art ====
- #7DaysLater (2013 on ABC2)
- 8 Nights Out West (2022)
- A Big Country (1968–1991)
- A League of Her Own (2022)
- A River Somewhere (1997–1998)
- Any Questions (1958–1960)
- Art Nation (2010–2011)
- Artscape (2011)
- The Arts Show (1999–2000)
- Art Works (2021–2023)
- At The Movies (2004–2014)
- Auction Room (2012)
- Australian Wildlife (1963)
- Australians at War (2001)
- Backchat (1986–1994)
- Beat The Chef (2005)
- Big Ideas (2010–2014)
- Bodybeat (1993)
- The Book Club (2006–2017)
- Bullied (2017–present)
- Bush Mechanics (2001)
- Bush Tucker Man (1988, 1990, 1996)
- Can We Help? (2006–2011)
- Canberra Confidential (2013)
- Carbon: The Unauthorised Biography (2022)
- Choir of Hard Knocks (2007)
- Collectors (2005–2011)
- Come and Get It (1983–1992)
- Come In on This (1959)
- Consuming Passions (1992–2002)
- The Cook and the Chef (2006–2009)
- Country Town Rescue (2012)
- The Critics (1959–1962)
- Croc College (2013)
- David Stratton's Stories of Australian Cinema (2017)
- Dream Gardens (2017)
- The Dreamhouse (2014)
- Dumb, Drunk & Racist (2012 on ABC2)
- Dynasties (2006)
- Elders with Andrew Denton (2008–2009)
- Everyone's A Critic (2018)
- The Exhibitionists (2022)
- Exhumed (2013)
- Exposed: The Case of Keli Lane (2018)
- Exposed: The Ghost Train Fire (2021)
- Faces of Change (1982)
- Family Confidential (2012–2015)
- The Family Court Murders (2022)
- Family Footsteps (2006–2008)
- Feedback (2002–2006)
- First Footprints (2013)
- The Floating Brothel (2006)
- For Love or Money (1987–1989)
- Frank Hurley: The Man who Made History (2005)
- Going Country (2021)
- The Good Food Show (1989)
- Good Game (2006–2007 on ABC, 2008–2016 on ABC2)
- Great Southern Land (2012)
- The Hack Half Hour (2008–2009 on ABC2)
- Hanging with Hoges (2014)
- Hannah Gadsby's Oz (2014)
- Harley & Katya (2022)
- Hatch, Match & Dispatch (2016–present)
- Hazards, Disasters and Survival (1998)
- Head First (2013–2014 on ABC2)
- Health (1959)
- Hello Birdy (2014)
- Housemates (2017 on ABC2)
- How the Quest Was Won (2004–2005)
- Hungry Beast (2009–2011)
- Howard on Menzies: The Making of Modern Australia (2016)
- The Howard Years (2008)
- I, Spry (2010)
- In the Wild (1976–1981)
- Ithaka: A Fight to Free Julian Assange (2022)
- Jillaroo School (2015)
- Kate Ceberano and Friends (1994)
- The Killing Season (2015)
- Labor in Power (1993)
- Life at... (2006, 2008, 2010, 2012)
- Long Way to the Top (2001)
- Love Is in the Air (2003)
- Juanita: A Family Mystery (2021)
- Mainly for Women (1961–1964)
- Making Australia Happy (2010)
- Making Couples Happy (2013)
- The Making of Modern Australia (2010)
- The Matt Flinders Show (1972)
- Matt Flinders and Friends (1973)
- A Matter of Chance (1981)
- Meet the Mavericks (2016–2017)
- Melbourne Composers (1961–1962)
- Melbourne Magazine (1957)
- Miriam Margolyes: Almost Australian (2020)
- Miriam Margolyes: Australia Unmasked (2022)
- My Favourite Album (2006)
- My Favourite Australian (2008)
- My Favourite Book (2004)
- My Favourite Film (2005)
- Naturally Australia (1996–2001)
- Nature Notebook (1958)
- Navy Divers (2008)
- The New Inventors (2004–2011)
- Next Stop Hollywood (2013)
- New Look at New Guinea (1959)
- Not Quite Art (2007 on ABC1, 2008 on ABC2)
- On the Road
- Open Learning (1992–2001)
- Operatunity Oz (2006)
- Outback ER (2015)
- Outback House (2005)
- Outback Kids (2011)
- Palazzo di Cozzo: The Australian Dream. Italian Style. (2022)
- Parental Guidance Recommended (1987–1992)
- Peking to Paris (2006)
- Picture Page (1956–1957)
- Plumpton High Babies (2003)
- Poh's Kitchen (2010–2012)
- Photo Finish (2012)
- Quantum (1985–2001)
- Race Around Oz (2000)
- Race Around the World (1997–1998)
- Race Around the Corner
- ReDesign My Brain (2013, 2015)
- Restoration Australia (2015)
- Revealing Gallipoli (2005)
- S'Cool Sport (1996–1997)
- Savage Indictment (1990)
- Science Today (1958)
- Screen Time (2017)
- Second Opinion (2005)
- Shitsville Express (2013 on ABC2)
- Silvia's Italian Table (2016)
- Six Australians (1984)
- Sleek Geeks (2008–2010)
- Space 22 (2022)
- Step into Paradise (2021)
- Stop Laughing...This Is Serious (2015–2017)
- Streets of Your Town (2016)
- South Side Story (2007)
- Sporting Nation (2012)
- Sow What (1967–1988)
- Stress Buster (2008)
- Strictly Speaking (2010–2011)
- Stuff (2008)
- Sunday Arts (2006–2009)
- Surfing the Menu (2003–2006)
- Surfing the Menu: The Next Generation (2016)
- Sydney Grows Up (1958)
- Sylvania Waters (1992)
- Talking Heads (2005–2010)
- Tall Poppy: A Skater's Story (2021)
- Tattoo Tales (2015 on ABC2)
- Tiny Oz (2022)
- Todd Sampson's Life on the Line (2017)
- Tomorrow's World (1959)
- Tonic (2011–2012)
- Towards 2000 (1981–1983)
- The Track (2000)
- I'm Wanita (2022)
- The War That Changed Us (2014)
- The Way We Were (2004)
- The Years That Made Us (2013)
- Two in the Top End (2008)
- TVTV (1993–1995)
- University Challenge Australia (1987–1989)
- Untold Stories (2014)
- The Vision Splendid (1977)
- Vulture (2005)
- Who Killed Dr Bogle and Mrs Chandler? (2006)
- Who's Been Sleeping in My House? (2011–2013)
- Wildlife Australia
- Women's World (1956–1963)

==== Sport ====
- Basketball: NBL (1979–2001, 2017–2018)
- Soccer: Socceroos Internationals
- Soccer: Matildas Internationals
- Soccer: W-League (2008–2017, 2019–2021), A-League (2019–2021)

==== Music ====
- The 10:30 Slot (1999–2000)
- Antenna (1984–1985)
- Australian All Star Jazz Band (1959)
- Beatbox (1985–1988)
- Between the Teeth (1986–1987)
- Billabong Band (1957)
- Commonwealth Jazz Club (1965)
- Countdown (1974–1987)
- Countdown Flipside (1983)
- Countdown Friday (1982)
- Countdown Revolution (1989–1990)
- The Factory (1987–1989)
- Fancy Free (1961)
- Flashez (1976–1977)
- Funky Road (1976)
- GTK (1969–1974)
- Hit Scene (1969–1972)
- Jazz Meets Folk (1964)
- Let's Go Square Dancing (1960)
- Look Who's Dropped In (1957–1958)
- Loud (1994)
- Make Ours Music (1958–1961)
- Matt Flinders and Friends (1972–1973)
- The Meldrum Tapes (1986–1987)
- Melody Time (1957, 1959)
  - The Mix (2014–2021)
- The Real Thing (1977–1978)
- Recovery (1996–2000)
- Rock Arena (1982–1989)
- Saturday Morning Fly (2002–2003)
- Shirley Abicair in Australia (1960)
- Six O'Clock Rock (1959–1962)
- Stampede (1994)
- Studio 22 (1999–2003)
- Sweet and Low (1959)
- Take 5 (1983–1984)
- Teen Scene (1964–1965)
- triple j tv (2006–2009 on ABC1 & ABC2)
- Valerie Cooney Sings (1958)
- Vic Sabrino Sings (1958)
- Videodisc (1980–1982)

==== Other ====
- Blackout (1989–1995), was produced by the newly established (1988) Aboriginal Programming Unit
- Message Stick (1999–2012) and presented by Aboriginal dancers Lillian Crombie and Malcolm Cole for Aboriginal and Torres Strait Islander audiences.

==== Preschool programs on ABC Kids / Children's programs on ABC Me ====
- A Very Barry Christmas (2008)
- Active Kidz (2004)
- Additional Fables (1992)
- Adventure Island (1967–1972)
- The Adventures of Blinky Bill (1993)
- The Adventures of Bottle Top Bill and His Best Friend Corky (2005–2009)
- The Adventures of Long John Silver (1958)
- The Adventures of Sam (1999)
- The Afternoon Show (1987–1993)
- Alexander's Afternoon (1980)
- Alexander's Antics (1980)
- The Alexander Bunyip Show (1981)
- Alexander Bunyip's Billabong (1978–1988)
- Alpha Scorpio (1974)
- Andra (1976)
- Arthur! and the Square Knights of the Round Table (1966–1968)
- Aussie Kids
- The Australian Wildlife Club Bulletin (1985–1986)
- ARVO (1979)
- Baby Antonio's Circus
- Backyard Science (2013–2015)
- Bananas in Pyjamas (1992–2001, 2011–2013)
- Bang Goes the Budgie (1985)
- The Beeps (2007–2008)
- Big Square Eye (1991–1992)
- Bindi the Jungle Girl (2007–2008)
- Bindi's Bootcamp (2012–2015 on ABC3)
- Blinky Bill's Around the World Adventures (2004, originally aired on Seven)
- Blinky Bill's Extraordinary Excursion (1995)
- Blue Water High (2005–2008)
- Boffins (1995, was only released on video but did air in a number of countries)
- Bubble Bath Bay
- Bunyip (1989)
- Butterfly Island (1985–1986, Season 1 only, the rest of the series aired on Seven Network from 1987 to 1993)
- C/o The Bartons (1988)
- Camera Script (1987)
- Captain Cookaburra's AustraliHa (1984–1988)
- Captain Cookaburra's Road to Discovery (1985–1986)
- CJ The DJ (2009–2010 originally aired on ABC3)
- Clowning Around (1991, originally aired on Seven)
- Clowning Around 2 (1993, originally aired on Seven)
- Come Midnight Monday (1982)
- Conspiracy 365
- Coral Island (1983)
- Couch Potato (1991–2001)
- Count Us In (1999–2000)
- Countdown to 3 (2009)
- Creature Features (2002–2008)
- Dance Academy (2010–2013 on ABC3)
- Dancing Down Under
- Dead Gorgeous (2010)
- Dirtgirlworld (2009–2011)
- Dorothy the Dinosaur (2007–2010)
- Earthwatch (1979–1989)
- Earthwatch Club (1983–1984)
- EC Plays Lift Off (1994)
- Elly & Jools (1990, only airs on ABC Kids, originally aired on Nine)
- Escape from Jupiter (1994)
- Eugenie Sandler P.I. (2000)
- Fame and Misfortune (1986)
- Fatty and George (1981)
- Feathers, Fur or Fins (1986–1991)
- The Ferals (1994–1995)
- Feral TV (1996–1997)
- Ferry Boat Fred (1992)
- Finders Keepers (1991–1992)
- Five Minutes More
- The Flamin' Thongs (2014 on ABC3)
- For the Juniors
- Frank and Francesca (1973)
- The Genie from Down Under (1996–1998)
- Giggle and Hoot (2009–2020 on ABC Kids)
- Go Health (1978–1987, originally aired on Nine)
- Golden Pennies (1985–1986)
- Grandpa Honeyant Storytime
- Guess How Much I Love You
- Happy Hatchday to Plasmo (1989)
- The Haunted School (1986)
- Happy baby the adventures of corn and peg (2022–present)
- Heads 'N Tails (1983)
- Home (1983)
- Hoota and Snoz (2002)
- Hunter (1984–1985)
- The Inbestigators (2019)
- Infinity Limited (1983–1984)
- Jemima's Big Adventure
- Joey's Big Adventure
- Johnson and Friends (1990–1995)
- Junior Sports Magazine (1962–1965)
- The Justine Clarke Show
- Kaboodle (1987–1990, was later aired on Seven Network from 1990 to 1993, sometimes airs again on ABC from 1990 to 1992, aired on ABC again in 1994, aired on ABC Kids for a last broadcast in 2002)
- Kideo (1993–1994)
- Kindergarten Playtime (1957–1966)
- The Kingdom of Paramithi (2008, originally aired on Nine)
- Kitu and Woofl (1997)
- The Koala Brothers
- Lab Rats Challenge
- Lachy!
- Little Lunch (2015 ABC Me)
- Lights, Camera, Action, Wiggles! (2002–2007)
- Lift Off (1992–1995)
- Li'l Elvis and the Truckstoppers (1998)
- Lizzie's Library (1995)
- The Maestro's Company (1985–1986, originally aired on SBS)
- The Magic Boomerang (1965–1966)
- Magic Mountain (1997–1998)
- The Magic Pudding (2000)
- Mal.com (2011 on ABC3)
- Maurice's Big Adventure
- Minty (1998)
- Mixy (1998–2002)
- Mr. Squiggle (1959–1999)
- My Great Big Adventure (2012 on ABC3)
- My Place (2009–2011 on ABC3)
- The Nargun and the Stars (1981)
- The New Adventures of Blinky Bill (1984–1987)
- The New Adventures of Figaro Pho
- News To Me (2016–2018 ABC Me)
- Nowhere Boys (2013–2018 on ABC Me)
- Noah and Saskia (2004)
- Ocean Girl (1994–1997, originally aired on Network Ten)
- Oswald
- Out There (1985 series)
- Out There (2003–2004)
- Pals (1987)
- Petals (1998–1999)
- Phoenix Five (1970)
- Plasmo (1997)
- Prank Patrol (2009–2013 on ABC3)
- Prank Patrol Road Trip
- Ready for This (2015 on ABC3)
- Return to Jupiter (1997)
- RollerCoaster (2005–2010)
- Round the Twist (1990–2001, Season 1 originally aired on Seven)
- The Saddle Club (2001–2003 on ABC, 2009 on Nine)
- Seven Little Australians (1973)
- Silversun (2004)
- Secret Valley (1984–1990)
- Ship to Shore (1992–1996)
- The Sleepover Club
- Splatalot
- Start from Scratch (1989)
- Steam Punks! (2013 on ABC3)
- Stop at this Station (1988–1990)
- The Stranger (1964–1965)
- Studio 3 (2009–2016 on ABC3)
- Sugar and Spice (1988–1989)
- The Sun on the Stubble (1996)
- Swap Shop (1988–1989)
- Swinging (1997)
- The Toothbrush Family (1977, season 1 only, originally aired on Nine Network)
- Touch the Sun (1988)
- Tracey McBean (2002–2006)
- Vidiot (1992–1995)
- Visions of Democracy (1998)
- WAC: World Animal Championships
- Wacky World Beaters
- Watch This Space (1982)
- Wayzgoose (1978)
- The Wayne Manifesto (1997)
- What Do You Know? (2010 on ABC3)
- What's the Big Idea?
- The Wiggles Show (18 April 2005 - 24 June 2009)
- Wiggle and Learn (12 May 2008 - 30 November 2011)
- Wiggle Town (2016)
- Wiggly Waffle (2009)
- The Winners (1985)
- Winston Steinburger and Sir Dudley Ding Dong (2016–2017)
- Worst Year of My Life Again (2014 on ABC3)
- Yakkity Yak (2002–2003, also aired on Nickelodeon Australia)
- My Year 12 Life (2017 on ABC Me and ABC)
- You're Skitting Me (2012–2016 on ABC Me)
- Zigby (2009–2015)

=== Foreign ===
==== 0–9 ====
- 100 Things to Do Before High School
- 1, 2, 3, Go!
- 11 Somerset
- 1990
- 2 Point 4 Children
- 2030 CE
- 3-2-1 Contact
- 30 Rock
- 6teen
- 64 Zoo Lane
- The 99
- 3000 Whys of Blue Cat

==== A ====
- A–Z of Belief
- Aaahh!!! Real Monsters
- The Abbey
- The Abbott and Costello Cartoon Show (originally aired on Seven and Ten)
- Abel's Island
- Absolute Genius with Dick and Dom
- Ace Lightning
- The Acme School of Stuff
- Across the Roof of the World
- An Actor's Life for Me
- The Admiral and the Princess
- The Adventurer
- Adventures in Rainbow Country (later moved to Nine)
- The Adventures of Abney & Teal
- The Adventures of Dawdle the Donkey
- The Adventures of Gulliver (later moved to Seven)
- The Adventures of Huckleberry Finn
- The Adventures of Hutch the Honeybee
- The Adventures of Portland Bill
- Adventures of the Sea Hawk
- The Adventures of Sir Prancelot
- Adventures of Sonic the Hedgehog
- The Adventures of Teddy Ruxpin
- The Adventures of Tintin
- The Adventures of Tugboat Annie
- Adventure Time (shared with 9Go!)
- Agony
- AEIOU
- The Aeronauts
- After Henry
- After the War
- Agatha Christie's Marple
- Agent Z and the Penguin from Mars
- Airline
- Albert Says... Nature Knows Best
- Albert the Fifth Musketeer
- Albie
- Alexander and the Terrible, Horrible, No Good, Very Bad Day
- Alexander, Who Used to Be Rich Last Sunday
- Alexei Sayle's Stuff
- Alfonso Bonzo
- Alias the Jester
- Alien Empire
- Aliens in the Family
- All at No 20
- All Creatures Great and Small
- The All Electric Amusement Arcade
- All for Love
- All in Good Faith
- The All New Alexei Sayle Show
- All Passion Spent
- Almost Never
- Alvin and the Chipmunks (Murakami Wolf Swenson/DIC Entertainment version)
- The Alvin Show (later moved to Ten as "Channel 0" and Seven)
- The Amazing Adrenalini Brothers
- The Amazing Adventures of Morph
- The Amazing Bone
- Amazing Extraordinary Friends
- The Amazing Live Sea Monkeys
- American Cinema
- American Visions
- An Actor's Life for Me
- Andy Pandy
- Andy Robson
- The Andy Williams Show
- Andy's Aquatic Adventures
- Andy's Baby Animals
- Andy's Prehistoric Adventures
- Andy's Secret Hideout
- Andy's Wild Adventures
- Angela Anaconda
- Angelina Ballerina (later moved to Ten)
- Angelina Ballerina: The Next Steps (later moved to Ten)
- Angelmouse
- The Angry Beavers
- Animal Ark
- Animal Crackers
- Animal Fair
- Animal Farm (later moved to SBS)
- Animal Hospital
- Animal Life
- Animal Magic
- Animal Mechanicals
- Animal School
- Animal Shelf
- Animal Stories
- Animals in Action
- The Animals of Farthing Wood
- Animated Classic Showcase
- Animorphs
- The Ann Sothern Show
- Anna and the King
- Anna of the Five Towns
- Anne of Green Gables: The Animated Series
- Annedroids
- Annika
- Anno Domini
- Antarctic Man
- Anthony
- Anthony Ant
- Antonio Carluccio's Italian Feast
- Anytime Tales
- The Aphrodite Inheritance
- Appuntamento in Italia
- The Aquabats! Super Show!
- Aquila
- Arabia
- The Arcade Show
- Archer's Goon
- Archibald the Koala
- Are All Schools Like Mine
- Are You Afraid of the Dark?
- Are You Being Served? (later moved to Seven)
- Armchair Thriller (later moved to Ten)
- Around the World in 80 Days
- Arrested Development
- Art Attack
- The Art of the Motion Picture
- Art Ninja
- Art's Place
- The Arthur Haynes Show
- As Time Goes By
- The Ascent of Man
- Ashenden
- Ashes to Ashes
- Asia Pacific Focus
- Aspel and Company
- The Assassination Run
- Asterix the Gaul
- Astro Boy (1980s)
- Astro Boy (2003 series)
- Atlantis High
- Atletico Partick
- Atom Ant (later moved to Seven)
- Atomic Betty
- Atomic Puppet
- Attenborough and Animals
- Aubrey
- An Actor's Life for Me
- An Audience with Billy Connolly (later moved to Seven)
- An Audience with Peter Ustinov
- Auf Wiedersehen, Pet
- Australian Ecology
- The Australian Experience
- Australian Eye
- Australian Impact
- Australian Studies
- Australians
- Automania
- Avatar: The Last Airbender (later moved to Ten)
- Avec Plaisir
- Avenger Penguins (later moved to 7TWO)
- The Avengers (later moved to Nine)
- The Avengers: Earth's Mightiest Heroes
- Avventura

==== B ====
- Babar
- Babar and the Adventures of Badou
- The Backyardigans
- Bali
- Bambaloo
- The Bamboo Bears
- Barney's Barrier Reef
- The Basil Brush Show
- Baby and Co.
- The Baby-Sitters Club
- Bad Boyes
- Bad Cop, Bad Cop
- Badger on the Barge
- Badger
- Badjelly the Witch
- Bagpuss
- Ballykissangel
- Bambinger
- The Bamboo Brush
- Bamse – The World's Strongest Bear!
- The Banana Splits (later moved to Southern Cross)
- Bananaman
- Bangers and Mash
- Barbara's World of Horses and Ponies
- The Barchester Chronicles
- Barney
- Barracuda
- Barriers
- Basic Photography
- Basil Brush
- Basil Hears a Noise
- The Baskervilles
- Batfink (originally aired on Ten)
- Battle of the Planets (originally aired on Ten)
- BB3B
- The Beachcombers
- Beached Az
- Bear in the Big Blue House
- The Bear, the Tiger and the Others
- Beast
- Beat of the City
- Beau Geste
- The Beautiful Life
- Bed of Roses
- Beginners, Please
- Behaving Badly
- The Beiderbecke Affair
- Being Ian
- Bel Ami
- Belle and Sebastian
- Benin: An African Kingdom
- Bentley's Bandbox
- Ben Elton: The Man from Auntie
- Ben Hall
- Benjamin the Elephant
- The Benny Hill Show
- The Berenstain Bears (later moved to Seven)
- The Berenstain Bears (2002 series)
- Bernard
- Bert and Ernie's Great Adventures
- Bertha
- Best Ed
- Best Sports Ever!
- The Betty Hutton Show
- Between the Lines
- Between the Lions
- Between Ourselves
- Between Two Worlds
- Beyond Tomorrow
- The BFG
- The Bible Lands
- Big Babies
- Big Bag
- Big Bird in Australia
- Big Bird in China
- The Big Knights
- A Big Country
- Big Kids
- The Big Pull
- Big Ted's Big Adventure
- Big Train
- The Big World of Little Adam
- Biggles
- The Bill (later moved to 10 Bold)
- Bill and Ben
- Bill and Bunny
- Billabong Band
- Billy the Cat
- Billy the Kid
- Billy Webb's Amazing Stories
- Binka the Cat
- Bird of Prey
- Birds of a Feather
- A Bit of Fry and Laurie
- Bits and Bytes
- Bits and Bytes 2
- The Biz
- Black Cab
- Black Hearts in Battersea
- Black Hole High
- Blackadder (originally aired on Seven)
- Blackadder II (originally aired on Seven)
- Blackadder the Third (originally aired on Seven)
- Blackadder Goes Forth (originally aired on Seven)
- Blackeyes
- Blackpool
- Black Books
- Black Panther: The Animated Series
- Blanche
- Blah Blah Blah
- Blake's 7
- Blazing Dragons
- Bless This House
- Blind Justice
- Bliss (originally aired on BBC First)
- Blood and Honey
- Blood on the Carpet
- Blott on the Landscape
- Blue Wilderness
- Blue's Clues
- Bob the Builder (Original stop motion series, 2015 reboot now airs on Eleven and classic series airs on Ten)
- Bob the Builder: Project Build It (later moved to Ten)
- Bob the Builder: Ready, Steady, Build! (later moved to Ten)
- Boblins
- Bod
- The Body in Question
- Body & Soul
- Bondi
- Bonje (originally aired on SBS)
- Book Book
- Book Bug
- Book Dramatisations
- The Book Group
- Bookie
- Bootleg
- Boruto: Naruto Next Generations
- Bootsie and Snudge
- Border Cafe
- Born and Bred
- The Borrowers
- The Boss
- Broadchurch
- Botanic Man
- Bouli
- Bounty Hamster
- Boy Dominic
- A Boy, a Duck and a Frog
- The Boy Merlin
- Boyd Q.C.
- Boys from the Blackstuff
- Brambly Hedge (originally aired on Nine)
- Bread
- Breaking Bad
- Break in the Sun
- Brewster the Rooster
- Brian Cox's Adventures in Time and Space
- Bright Hair
- Brittas Empire
- The Brollys
- Bromwell High
- Brothers by Choice
- Brum
- The Brunel Experience
- Brush Strokes (later moved to Ten)
- The Bryan Davies Show
- Bucky and Pepito
- Buddy
- Budgie the Little Helicopter
- Building Dreams
- Build Your Own Dreams
- Bumble
- Bump
- Bump in the Night
- A Bunch of Fives
- A Bunch of Munsch
- The Bunjee Venture
- Buongiorno Italia
- Burnside
- The Burrows Collection
- The Bush Gang
- Bush Mechanics
- Business Concepts
- Busy Buses
- The Busy World of Richard Scarry
- Butch Cassidy and the Sundance Kids (later moved to Seven)
- Buzz and Poppy
- By the Sword Divided
- Byker Grove

==== C ====
- Caillou (moved to Fox Kids)
- Call Me Mister
- Callan
- Calling the Shots
- Campaign
- The Campbells
- The Canal Children
- Canimals
- Capital
- Capital City
- Captain Fathom
- Captain Flamingo
- Captain Mack
- Captain Planet and the Planeteers
- Captain Pugwash
- Capitol Critters
- Cardiac Arrest
- Carrie's War
- Carl Squared
- Carol Burnett and Friends
- Cartoons for Big Kids
- Casanova '73
- Castaway (originally aired on Seven)
- Casper and the Angels (later moved to Seven)
- The Cat Came Back
- CatDog
- Catherine the Great
- Catie's Amazing Machines
- Catspaw
- The Cattanooga Cats
- Catweazle
- The Cavanaughs
- Cavern Deep
- ChalkZone
- Chance in a Million
- Chandler & Co
- Channel 1, 2, 3, 4, 5
- Charles and Francois
- The Charlie Brown and Snoopy Show (originally aired on Nine)
- Charlie Chalk
- Charlie Chaplin Theatre
- Charlie Needs a Cloak
- The Chaser Decides (2004, 2007)
- Chaser News Alert (2005)
- Chelmsford 123
- Children Around the World
- Children of the Dog Star
- Children of Fire Mountain
- The Children of Green Knowe
- The Children of New Forest
- Children of the North
- Children of the Stones
- A Child's Garden of Verses
- The Chinese Detective
- The Chinese Puzzle
- The Choir
- Chris Cross
- Christmas Eve on Sesame Street
- Christopher Crocodile
- The Chronicles of Narnia
- Chocky
- Chocky's Challenge
- Chocky's Children
- The Choir
- Chorlton and the Wheelies
- Cinema Europe
- Circle of Faith
- Circus
- Circus Everywhere
- The Cisco Kid
- Citizen James
- Citizen Smith
- City of the Wildcats
- City Tails
- Clarence (TV movie)
- Clarence (1988 series)
- Clarissa
- Class of the Titans
- Clifford the Big Red Dog
- The Clifton House Mystery
- The Clive James Show
- Close-Up
- The Clown of God
- Cockatoos at Three Springs
- Code Geass: Lelouch of the Rebellion
- The Codebreakers
- Codename Icarus
- The Cola Conquest
- The Colbert Report
- Cold Lazarus
- Cold Warrior
- The Colonials
- Come Back, Lucy
- Come Back Mrs. Noah
- Come In on This
- Comedy Break
- Comedy Playhouse
- The Comic Strip
- The Comic Strip Presents...
- Common as Muck
- The Completely Mental Misadventures of Ed Grimley
- Computer Club
- Computers in Action
- Computer Studies
- Comrades
- Concepts in Science
- Concerto Grosso Modo
- The Concert Stages of Europe
- Connie the Cow
- Construction Site
- Consumer Power
- Contrabandits
- The Cook and the Chef
- Cooper's Half Hour
- The Cops
- Coral Island
- Corduroy
- Correlli
- A Cosmic Christmas (later moved to Ten)
- Cosmos: A Personal Voyage
- Coupling
- Countdown to War
- Count Duckula (later moved to Ten and 7TWO)
- The Count of Monte Cristo
- Count Us In
- Country Boy
- Country GP
- The Country Mouse and the City Mouse Adventures
- Countrywide
- The Cow That Fell in the Canal
- Cowboy Bebop
- Crackerjack
- Craft, Design and Technology
- Crayon Kingdom
- Creature Comforts
- Crime, Inc.
- Criminal Justice
- The Critics
- Cro
- The Croc-Note Show
- The Crystal Maze
- Crystal Tipps and Alistair
- Cuckoo Land
- The Cuckoo Waltz
- Cubeez
- Curiosity Quest
- A Curious and Diverse Flora
- Curious George
- Curse of the Viking's Grave
- Cushion Kids (originally aired on Nine)
- Custer's Last Stand Up
- Cyberchase

==== D ====
- Dad
- Dad's Army (later moved to Ten)
- Dalziel and Pascoe
- Dance Academy
- The Dancing Princesses
- Dani's Castle
- Dani’s House
- Danedyke Mystery
- Danger Bay
- Danger: Marmalade At Work
- Danger Mouse (1981 series, later moved to 7TWO)
- Danger UXB
- Dangerfield
- The Danny Kaye Show
- Daria (MTV, 1997–2001, later moved to SBS and SBS Two)
- A Dark-Adapted Eye
- The Dark Side of the Sun
- Daring and Grace: Teen Detectives
- Dave Allen at Large
- Davey and Goliath
- David Copperfield
- The David Nixon Show
- The Day of the Triffids
- The Days and Nights of Molly Dodd
- Days of Hope
- Dead Entry
- Dead Gorgeous
- Dead Head
- The Dean Martin Show
- Death in Holy Orders
- Death Note
- The December Rose
- Degrassi: First Class
- Degrassi High
- Degrassi Junior High
- Degrassi Talks
- Deltora Quest
- The Demon Headmaster
- The Demon Headmaster (2019 series)
- Dennis and Gnasher (2009 series, originally aired on Nine Network and GO!)
- Dennis the Menace (later moved to Ten)
- Des
- Des Le Debut
- Design Classics
- Destination Space
- Detentionaire
- Detention Adventure
- Devenish
- Diana
- Die Kinder
- Dinnerladies
- Dirty Beasts
- Discovering Japan
- Discovering Science
- Diver Dan
- Do It
- Doctor De Soto
- Dr. Dimensionpants
- Dr. Dog
- Doctor Dolittle
- Doctor Finlay
- Dr. Finlay's Casebook
- Doctor Jazz
- Dr Otter
- Doctor Snuggles
- Doctor Who Confidential (cutdowns)
- Doctor Who: The Movie
- Dodgem
- Dodger, Bonzo and the Rest
- The Dodo Club
- DoDo, The Kid from Outer Space
- Dog and Duck
- Dog City
- Dog Tracer
- A Dog's Life
- Dogtanian and the Three Muskehounds
- Doki
- Don and Pete
- Don Burrows
- The Donna Reed Show
- Donovan Quick
- Don't Eat the Neighbours
- Don't Eat the Pictures
- Don't Miss Wax
- Don't Wait Up
- Dougie in Disguise
- Down to Earth
- Dr. Otter
- Dragon
- Dragon Tales
- Dragon's Tongue
- Drake's Venture
- Dramarama
- Dream Stuffing
- The Dreamstone
- Dreamtime Stories
- Drummer Hoff
- The Duchess of Duke Street
- Durrell in Russia
- Dustbins

==== E ====
- The Eagle of the Ninth
- Earthfasts
- Earthworm Jim
- East of Everything
- East of the Moon
- EastEnders
- Eastern Tales
- Ebb and Flo
- Echo
- Eckhart
- The Ed Sullivan Show
- Eddie's Alphabet
- Eddy and the Bear
- Edge of Darkness
- Edge of the Cold
- Edge of the Wedge
- Edgar and Ellen
- El Dorado Dreamwork
- Educating Marmalade
- Edward and Mrs Simpson
- The Einstein Factor
- El Nombre
- Electric Avenue
- The Electric Company (later moved to Ten and SBS)
- Electronic Officer
- Elidor
- Ella the Elephant
- Ellen's Acres
- Elmo's World
- Emma and Grandpa
- The Enchanted Castle
- The Enchanted House
- Encounter France
- End of Empire
- Engie Benjy
- Engineering Craft Studies
- English Have a Go
- English Time
- Enid Blyton's Enchanted Lands
- Enid Blyton's Secret Series
- Encounter Italy
- The Enigma Files
- The Enormous Crocodile
- Entree Libre
- Environmental Man
- Erebus: The Aftermath
- Ernie's Incredible Illucinations
- Escape from Colditz
- Escape from Scorpion Island
- Espana Viva
- Ethelbert the Tiger
- Eureka
- Eureka!
- Eureka Street
- Everest by Balloon
- The Evie Hayes Show
- The Ex-PM
- Executive Stress
- Expedition Adam '84
- Express
- The Eye of the Dragon
- Eye of the Storm
- Eye of the Wolf
- Eye on Nature

==== F ====
- F Troop (later moved to Ten)
- Faces of Change
- Faces of Japan
- Facing Writers
- The Facts of Life
- The Fainthearted Feminist
- The Fairytaler
- The Fall and Rise of Reginald Perrin
- Fallen Angels
- Fame is the Spur
- Families of the World
- Family
- The Family Ness
- The Famous Five (1970s)
- The Famous Five (1990s)
- The Fantastic Flying Journey
- Fantastic Max (later moved to Seven)
- Farmkids
- Farnham and Byrne
- Fast Forward
- The Fast Lane
- The Fat
- Fat Tulip Too
- Father Christmas
- Father Ted (originally aired on Nine)
- Fawlty Towers (later moved to Seven)
- The Fear
- The Feathered Serpent
- Felix the Cat (later moved to Ten and Seven)
- Ferry Boat Fred
- Fievel's American Tails
- Fifi and the Flowertots (moved to DreamWorks Channel)
- Filthy Rich & Catflap
- Fimbles
- The Final Cut
- Find the Link
- Finders Seekers
- A Fine Romance
- Fingerbobs
- The Fire-Raiser
- Fireman Sam (original series) (classic series airs on Ten)
- First of the Summer Wine
- Five Children and It
- Five Minute Wonder
- Flambards
- The Flame Trees of Thika
- Flashing Pedals
- The Flaxton Boys
- The Flight of the Heron
- Flight Squad
- Flip, Slide, Turn
- Flipper & Lopaka
- The Flockton Flyer
- Floorshow
- Flower Pot Men
- Flower Stories
- Floyd on Fish (originally aired on SBS)
- Fly Tales
- The Flying Kiwi
- Flying Start
- Focus on Flowers
- Foo-Foo
- The Fool of the World and the Flying Ship
- The Foolish Frog
- For The Juniors
- For One Night Only
- Forest Friends
- The Forest Rangers
- Forget Me Not Farm
- The Forgotten Toys (special later moved to Seven)
- Form 3 Maths
- Fortitude
- Fortunes of War
- Four Fathers
- The Four Sevens
- The Fourth Arm
- Fourways Farm
- The Foxbusters
- Fox Tales
- Foyle's War
- Fragile Earth
- The Fragile Heart
- Framed
- Frankie Howerd Confessions
- Frankie's House
- Franklin
- Franklin and Friends
- Franny's Feet
- Freaky
- Freaky Eaters (broadcast as Eataholics)
- Freaky Stories
- Fred Basset
- Freddie and Max
- Freddie Mercury: The Final Act
- Freefonix
- Freewheelers
- French and Saunders
- French Fields
- Fresh Fields
- Freud
- Friday Night Dinner
- The Friday Weekley
- Friend or Foe
- Frog and Toad are Friends
- Frogets
- From Monkeys to Apes
- Frontiers
- Frootie Tooties
- The Frost Report
- Fruits Basket
- The Fugitives (TV series)
- Full House (1972 version)
- The Full Wax
- The Fully Ordained Meat Pie
- Fun Song Factory
- Funky Squad
- Funny Little Bugs
- Funny Things Happen Down Under
- Funnybones
- Fun with Claude
- The Further Adventures of SuperTed

==== G ====
- G.B.H.
- The Gadfly
- Gallowglass
- Gaspard and Lisa
- The Galton and Simpson Playhouse
- The Game of Life
- Game On
- Gardens of the World with Audrey Hepburn
- Gasp (originally aired on Nine Network)
- Gather Your Dreams
- The Gees
- Gefiterfish
- The Gemini Factor
- Gems
- Gerald McBoing-Boing
- Gentle Ben
- Geography Today
- George and the Christmas Star
- George and Martha
- George and Mildred
- George Shrinks
- The Ghost and Mrs. Muir
- Ghost Hunter
- Ghostbusters
- Ghostwriter
- The Ghosts of Motley Hall
- The Giddy Game Show
- The Gift (British TV series)
- Gimme Gimme Gimme
- The Girl from Mars
- The Girl from U.N.C.L.E.
- Girls on Top
- Girl Stuff, Boy Stuff
- Give Us a Break
- Give 'em Heaps
- Glitch
- The Glittering Prizes
- God's Wonderful Railway
- Goggle-Eyes
- Gogs
- Going Bananas
- Golden Silents
- Gold, Gold, Gold
- A Gondola on the Murray
- Goodbye, Mr Kent
- Goodnight Sweetheart
- The Goodies (later moved to Seven and Ten)
- The Good Life (later moved to Ten)
- The Good Old Days
- Gortimer Gibbon's Life On Normal Street
- The Governor
- The Governor and J.J.
- The Graham Norton Show (now on Ten)
- Grandma Bricks of Swallow Street
- Grandpa in My Pocket
- Grange Hill
- Granpa
- Grass Roots
- Grasshopper Island
- The Gravy Train
- The Gravy Train Goes East
- The Great Composers
- Great Crimes and Trials of the 20th Century
- Great Expectations
- Great Military Blunders
- The Great Railway Journeys of the World
- The Great Wall of Iron
- The Greatest American Hero (originally aired on Ten, later moved to Seven)
- Greece Today
- The Greedysaurus Gang
- Greenfingers
- Gremlins
- Grim Tales
- Grizzly Tales for Gruesome Kids
- Grojband
- The Growing Pains of Adrian Mole
- Growing Up Creepie
- The Gruen Transfer
- Gruey
- GTK
- Gulliver's Travels
- Gumby (originally aired on Seven and Nine)
- Gumtree
- Gustavus (later aired on SBS)
- Gypsy Girl

==== H ====
- Hairy Maclary
- Hal Lashwood's Alabama Jubilee
- Hallo aus Berlin
- Hammy Hamster's Adventures On the Riverbank
- The Hanging Gale
- Hannay
- Hank Zipzer
- The Happy Apple
- Happy Birthday Moon
- The Hardy Boys
- Harriet's Army
- Harry and His Bucket Full of Dinosaurs
- Harry and the Hendersons (later moved to Ten)
- Harry and the Wrinklies
- The Haunting of Cassie Palmer
- Hawaii Five-O
- Hawkmoor
- Hazell
- Heart of the Dragon
- Heartland
- Heartbeat
- The Heat of the Day
- Heathcliff
- Hedgehog Wedding
- Hedgerow House
- Heil Caesar
- The Hello Girls
- Help
- Help! I'm a Teenage Outlaw
- Henry's Cat
- Henry's Leg
- Here Come the Girls
- Here in the West
- Here's the Beat
- Here's How!
- Here's Lucy
- Hergé's Adventures of Tintin (1991 series)
- The Herlufs
- Hero to Zero
- Heroes of the Faith
- Hetty Wainthropp Investigates
- Hey Arnold!
- Hey, Landlord
- Hi-De-Hi!
- Hiding
- High Fidelity
- The High Fructose Adventures of Annoying Orange
- Highway Thru Hell
- Hilary
- The Hill of the Red Fox
- Hill Street Blues (originally aired on Seven)
- The Hills of Heaven
- Himalaya with Michael Palin
- History Economics
- The Hitchhiker's Guide to the Galaxy (later moved to SBS)
- Hold the Back Page
- Hold the Dream
- Holiday
- Holiday Hazards
- The Hollowmen
- Hollywood: You Must Remember This
- Hollywood Legends
- Hollywood the Golden Years: The RKO Story
- Home James!
- Homer and Landau
- The Hoobs
- The Hooley Dooleys
- Hopla
- Horrible Histories (2001 series)
- Horrible Histories (2009 series)
- Horse in the House
- A Horseman Riding By
- Horses Galore
- Hothouse
- Hot Chips
- The Hot Shoe Show
- Hound for Hire
- House of Cards
- House of Elliott
- House of Rock
- How a Child Grows
- How Do You Want Me?
- How Green Was My Valley
- How Not to Behave
- How to Marry a Millionaire
- How We Used to Live
- How You Get to the Queue!
- Howards' Way
- How's Your Father?
- Hubble Bubble
- Hugh and I
- Hugo & Rita: The Series
- Hullabaloo
- The Human Body
- Humf
- Hunter's Gold
- Huntingtower
- Hustle
- The Hydronauts
- Hyperdrive

==== I ====
- I Didn't Know You Cared
- I Dream
- I Know a Secret
- I Love Lucy
- I Married Joan
- I Spy
- Iggy Arbuckle
- Images of Nature
- In a Land of Plenty
- In Sickness and in Health
- In Transit
- In the Company of Men
- In the Footsteps of Alexander the Great
- In the Night Garden
- In the Red
- In the Wild with Harry Butler
- In Your Garden
- Industry
- Infant Maths
- The Inner Power
- Insektors
- Inside Creation
- Inside Running
- Inspector Gadget (later moved to Ten)
- Inspector Gadget Saves Christmas
- Into the Labyrinth
- Into Music
- The Invisible Man
- The Irish R.M.
- Iron Man: Armored Adventures
- Island of the Skog
- It Ain't Half Hot Mum (later moved to Seven and Ten)
- It Takes a Worried Man
- Italianissimo
- It's a Date
- It's a Square World

==== J ====
- Jacek
- Jack High
- Jack the Ripper
- Jackanory Playhouse
- Jakers! The Adventures of Piggley Winks
- Jake's Progress
- Jam Sandwich
- Jamie and the Magic Torch
- Jamillah and Aladdin
- Janas
- Jandal Burn
- Jane Eyre
- Jasper the Penguin
- Jay Jay the Jet Plane
- Jazz Meets Folk
- Jellabies
- Jemima Shore Investigates
- Jeopardy
- Jibber Jabber
- The Jim Davidson Show
- Jim Henson Presents the World of Puppetry
- Jim Henson's The Storyteller (originally aired on Ten)
- Jimbo and the Jet-Set
- The Jimmy Wheeler Show
- Jimmy's Den
- Jockey School
- John McNab
- The Johnny Cash Show
- The Johnny Gredula Show
- Joint Accountant
- Jonathan Creek
- Joshua Jones
- Journey into Thailand
- Journey to the Himalayas
- The Judy Garland Show
- Jumbleland
- Jungle Tales
- Junior Sports Magazine
- Junkyard Wars
- Jurassic Cubs
- Just Barbara
- Just for Laughs
- Just Good Friends (later moved to Ten)
- Just Liz
- Just William (1990s version, the 1970s version was originally aired on Seven Network)

==== K ====
- Kaeloo
- Kamisama Kiss
- Kate
- Katie and Orbie
- Katy
- Kavanagh QC
- The Keepers
- Ken Hom's Chinese Cookery (originally aired on SBS)
- The Ken Noyle Show
- Kenny and Dolly
- The Kenny Everett Video Show
- Kenny the Shark
- Keeping Up Appearances
- Kessler
- Kevin and Co.
- Key to Freedom
- Kid in the Corner
- Kid vs. Kat (Also aired on Nickelodeon)
- The Kids from 47A
- The Kids of Degrassi Street
- Kidsongs
- Kimba the White Lion
- A Kind of Loving
- King
- King and Castle
- King Arthur's Disasters
- King Cinder
- King Leonardo and His Short Subjects (later moved to Seven, Nine and Ten)
- The King of Instruments
- Kingdom 4
- The King's Outlaw
- Kinsey
- Kip and David
- Kipper
- Kirby's Company
- Kiri the Clown
- Kiss Me Kate
- Kittson Fahey
- Koki
- K-On!
- Kontakte
- The Krypton Factor
- The Kumars at No. 42

==== L ====
- La Linea
- La Strada (later moved to SBS)
- Labyrinth
- Ladies in Charge
- Laff-a-Bits
- Lagos Airport
- Laid
- The Lakes
- The Land Before Time
- Land of the Tiger
- Lanfeust Quest
- Langley Bottom
- Lapitch the Little Shoemaker
- The Large Family
- The Larkins
- Larry the Lamb
- Lassie (later moved to Ten)
- The Last Emperor
- Last of the Summer Wine
- The Last Song
- The Late Clive James
- Late Starter
- Latin Holiday
- The Last Song
- A Laurel and Hardy Cartoon (later moved to Ten and Seven)
- Lavender Castle
- LazyTown
- Le Club
- The League of Gentlemen
- Learned Friends
- A Lease on Life
- The Leatherstocking Tales
- Leave it to Charlie
- The Legend of King Arthur
- The Legend of Lochnagar
- The Legend of Robin Hood
- The Legend of White Fang
- The Legends of Treasure Island (later moved to 7TWO)
- Lens on Lilliput
- Leopold the Cat
- Lesley Garrett Tonight
- Let There Be Love
- Let's Go Maths
- Let's Learn Japanese
- Let's Read with Basil Brush
- Letters from Felix
- Letty
- The Librarians
- Life Force
- The Life of Birds
- The Life of Riley
- Life on Earth
- Life on Mars
- Lifeskills
- The Legend of Dick and Dom
- Life with Boys
- Lift Off
- Lincoln
- The Lion, the Witch and the Wardrobe
- Lisa
- The Little and Large Telly Show
- Little Bear
- Little Britain
- Little Charley Bear (later moved to DreamWorks)
- The Little Engine That Could
- Little Ghosts
- Little Grey Rabbit
- Little Lord Fauntleroy
- The Little Lulu Show
- The Little Match Girl
- Little Monsters
- Little Mouse on the Prairie
- Little Robots
- Little Tim and the Brave Sea Captain
- Littlest Pet Shop (1995 Series)
- The Liver Birds
- Living Australia
- Living Britain
- Living the Dream
- Living in Asia
- Living in Japan
- Living in the 90s
- The Living Landscape
- Little Ted's Big Adventure
- Living Tomorrow
- Living with the Law
- The Lizard King
- Lizzie McGuire
- Lizzie's Pictures
- The Lodge
- Lomax, the Hound of Music
- London Embassy
- The Long Chase
- Look
- Look at a Book
- Look at It This Way
- Look Up
- Look Who's Dropped In
- Lorne Greene's Last of the Wild
- Lorne Greene's New Wilderness
- Lost Belongings
- Lost in Oz
- The Lotus Eaters
- The Loud House (Now on 10 Shake)
- Love in a Cold Climate
- Love on a Branch Line
- Lovejoy
- Lower Primary Science
- Lucky Luke
- The Lucy Show
- Ludwig

==== M ====
- The Machine Gunners
- Made by Design
- Madeline
- Madison
- Madness
- Madson
- Maharajas
- Maggie and the Ferocious Beast (aired only on ABC Kids)
- Magic Adventures of Mumfie
- Make Way for Noddy
- Masha and the Bear
- The Magic Bag
- The Magic Ball
- The Magic Finger
- The Magic House
- The Magic Library
- The Magic Park
- The Magic Roundabout (original series)
- The Magic Roundabout (2007 reboot)
- The Magic School Bus (originally aired on Ten)
- The Magical World of Margaret Mahy
- The Maharajas
- Maid Marian and Her Merry Men
- Maigret (1960 series)
- Mainly for Women
- Maisie Raine
- Maisy
- Make It Pop
- Make Ours Music
- Mama Mirabelle's Home Movies
- Mamemo
- Man About the House
- The Man in Room 17
- Man on the Rim
- The Man Who Thought With His Hat
- The Manageress
- Mansfield Park
- Many Nations, One People
- Maori Legends of New Zealand
- Marcia's Music
- Maria Chapdelaine
- Marion and Geoff
- The Marriage Lines
- Martin Chuzzlewit
- Martin Morning
- The Marzipan Pig
- The Massingham Affair
- The Master of Ballantrae
- Masterworks from the World's Great Museums
- Materials We Need
- Mathematical Eye
- Mathica's Mathshop
- Maths at Work
- Maths Break
- The Maths Programme
- Matilda's Dream
- Matt and Jenny
- Max & Ruby
- The Max Headroom Show (a second show later aired on Seven)
- May to December
- Maya the Bee (2012)
- McCallum
- The Mechanical Universe
- The Media
- Meena
- Meet
- Meet the Wife
- Melody Time
- The Memphis Trousers Half Hour (2005)
- Men Behaving Badly
- Mentors
- The Merchant of Venice
- Mercury
- Merlin the Magical Puppy
- Metal Mickey
- Metalheads
- M.I. High
- Michael Bentine's Potty Time (originally aired on Seven)
- Michael Palin: Around the World in 80 Days
- Michael Palin's Hemingway Adventure
- Microbes and Men
- Microdocs
- The Middle East
- Middle English
- Midnight Patrol: Adventures in the Dream Zone
- Miffy
- Miffy and Friends
- Mighty Machines
- Mike and Angelo (season 1 only)
- The Mill on the Floss
- Minder (later moved to Seven and Ten)
- Mini Dragons
- Miriam and Alan: Lost in Scotland
- Miriam's Big Fat Adventure
- Miss BG
- Miss Jones and Son
- The Missing Children
- The Missing Postman
- Mission Reading
- Mr. Bean: The Animated Series
- Mr Benn
- Mr. Moon
- Mister Ed (later moved to Seven and Nine)
- Mr. Fixit
- Mr. Men
- Mr. Palfrey of Westminster
- Mr Wakefield's Crusade
- The Mrs Bradley Mysteries
- Molang
- Molly's Gang
- Monarch of the Glen
- Money Matters
- Monkey
- Monkey Dust
- A Monkey's Tale
- The Monocled Mutineer
- Monster Maker (originally aired on Ten)
- Monty
- Monty Python's Flying Circus (later moved to Seven)
- Moody and Pegg
- Moominvalley
- The Moon Stallion
- Moondial
- Moonflight
- Moonlighting
- More Than Words
- More Winners
- The Morph Files
- Morris's Disappearing Bag
- Mortimer and Arabel
- Mortified (originally aired on Nine)
- Moses Jones
- The Most Wonderful Egg in the World
- Mot
- Mother Love
- The Mousehole Cat
- Moving
- Moving Wallpaper
- Moynihan
- Mr. Bean (later moved to Seven)
- Mr. Magoo
- Mr. Squiggle
- Muffin the Mule
- A Mug's Game
- The Muppet Musicians of Bremen (later moved to Seven)
- Murder Most Horrid
- Murder of a Moderate Man
- Murder Squad
- Murphy's Law
- Music and Dance
- Music Box
- Music Time
- Musical Triangles
- My Best Friend is an Alien
- My Family
- My Favourite Film
- My Favorite Martian (later moved to Nine)
- My Favorite Martian's Cartoon Show
- My Friend Rabbit
- My Good Friend
- Mystery and Imagination
- MythBusters Jr.
- The Mysteries of Providence
- The Mysterious Cities of Gold (later moved to SBS and SBS Two)
- The Mysterious Tadpole
- The Mystery of Black Rose Castle

==== N ====
- Nanny
- Naruto (season 1 only)
- Nature Boy
- Nature Notebook
- Nature Watch Digest
- The Nearly Man
- Needles and Pins
- Nellie the Elephant
- Never the Twain
- The Neverending Story
- The New Adventures of Beans Baxter
- The New Adventures of Captain Planet
- The New Adventures of Flash Gordon
- The New Adventures of Huckleberry Finn
- The New Adventures of Lucky Luke
- The New Adventures of Madeline (later moved to Seven Network from 2002 to 2003)
- The New Adventures of Morph
- The New Avengers
- New Captain Scarlet
- The New Ghostwriter Mysteries
- New Guinea: An Island Apart
- New Look at New Guinea
- The New Russia
- New Scotland Yard
- New Tricks
- New Zealand Free
- Next of Kin
- Nice Town
- Nico
- Night and Day
- Night of the Red Hunter
- Nighty Night
- The Ninja Follies
- No Job for a Lady
- No Strings
- No, Honestly
- Noah and Nelly in... SkylArk (later moved to SBS)
- Noah's Castle
- Noah's Island
- Nobody's Hero
- Noddy
- Noddy's Toyland Adventures
- Nonsense and Lullabyes
- North Square
- Northern Australian Documentaries
- Northwood
- Nostromo
- Not in Front of Children
- Not Only... But Also
- Noughts + Crosses
- Numbers Count
- The Nutty Squirrels Present (later moved to NRN and several regional television networks but only in NSW)

==== O ====
- Oakie Doke
- Oasis in Space
- Occasional Wife
- Oceans Alive
- Oggy and the Cockroaches (Seasons 1–3) (2009–2012)
- Octopussy from the 2nd Floor
- Odd Man Out
- Oddie in Paradise
- Odysseus: The Greatest Hero of Them All
- The Office (US)
- Oh, Mr. Toad
- Oh No, It's Selwyn Froggitt
- Old Bear Stories
- The Old Devils
- The Old Men at the Zoo
- Old-Time Ballroom
- Oliver Twist
- Olivia
- Olliver's Adventures
- The Omega Factor
- The Omid Djalili Show
- One by One
- One Foot in the Grave
- The Onedin Line
- Only One Earth
- Only Fools and Horses
- On the Up
- Once Upon a Time
- Only One Earth
- Only When I Laugh
- Oobi
- Open All Hours (later moved to Seven)
- Open a Door
- Operavox: The Animated Operas
- Oranges Are Not the Only Fruit
- The Orchestra
- The Ordinary Bath
- Order in the House
- Orson and Olivia
- Oscar and Friends
- Oscar and the Great Wooferoo
- Oscar Charlie
- Oscar's Orchestra
- Oswald
- Ouran High School Host Club
- Our Asian Neighbours
- Our Backyard
- Our Hero
- Our John Willie
- Our Multicultural Society
- Our Mutual Friend
- Out 'N' About
- Out of Bounds
- Out of the Fiery Furnace
- The Owl Service
- Oxbridge Blues

==== P ====
- P.B. Bear and Friends
- Pablo the Little Red Fox
- Paddington
- The Painter's World
- Pajanimals
- Palace of Dreams
- The Pallisers
- Panorama
- Papertrail
- The Paradise Club
- Paradise Postponed
- Park Ranger
- Parkinson
- Parks and Recreation
- Parnell and the Englishwoman
- Party Animals
- Partyland
- Passwords
- Pat & Mat
- Patchwork Pals
- The Patchwork Hero
- Pathway to Australian Science
- The Paul Daniels Magic Show
- Paulus the Woodgnome
- Peach's Gold
- Peanuts Specials
- Pearlie (originally aired on Ten)
- The Pee-Wee Herman Show
- The Peep Peep Show
- Peg + Cat
- Pele
- Pennies from Heaven
- People Like Us
- Percy the Park Keeper (originally aired on Nine)
- A Perfect Spy
- Personally Yours
- The Peter Serafinowicz Show
- The Phil Silvers Show
- Philbert Frog
- The Phoenix
- Phoenix 5
- The Phoenix and the Carpet
- Picture This
- Pie in the Sky
- Pig in the Middle
- Piggeldy and Frederick
- Piggsburg Pigs
- Pilgrim's Rest
- Pilgrims
- Pirates
- Pingu
- Pinky and Perky
- The Pinky and Perky Show
- Pinny's House
- Pinocchio
- Pins & Nettle
- Pippa the Hen
- Pippi Longstocking
- A Place in the World
- The Plague
- Planet Earth
- Planet Under Pressure
- The Planets
- Plastinots
- Play Away
- Play Films
- Play with Me Sesame
- Played in Australia
- Players to the Gallery
- Please Like Me (2013–2016)
- Plonsters
- Plotlands
- Plug It In, Switch It On
- Plums, Plots and Plans
- A Pocket for Corduroy
- A Pocketful of Dreams
- The Poetry Book
- Pole to Pole
- Pollyanna
- Pongwiffy
- Pop Movie
- Pororo the Little Penguin
- Porridge
- Portrait of a Marriage
- Postman Pat
- Postman Pat Special Delivery Service (later moved to DreamWorks Channel)
- Pot Black
- Potter
- Power in the Pacific
- Powerhouse
- Powers
- Press Gang (later moved to 7TWO)
- Pressure Point
- Preston Pig
- Pride and Prejudice (1995 series)
- Primary Media
- Prince Cinders
- Prince of Denmark
- The Princes and the Press
- The Princess and the Flying Shoemaker
- The Prince and the Pauper
- Private Lies
- Private Life of Plants
- Private Schulz
- The Prize: The Epic Quest for Oil, Money and Power
- Professor Balthazar
- Project Mc2
- Prospects
- Psychos
- Puddle Lane
- Pulaski: The TV Detective
- Puppets
- The Purple Jacaranda
- Pure Pwnage
- Puzzle Maths

==== Q ====
- Q8
- Q.T. Hush
- Quaq Quao
- Quark
- The Queen's Nose
- Queer as Folk
- Quest of Eagles
- The Quiet Season
- Quinz Minutes
- The Quiz Kids
- Quo Vadis?

==== R ====
- R.W.
- The Raccoons
- Rag, Tag and Bobtail
- The Rag Trade
- The Raggy Dolls
- Ragtime
- Rainbow
- Rainbow Fish
- Ramona
- Randling
- The Rare Ones
- The Ratties
- The Ravelled Thread
- The Ray Bradbury Theatre
- Read All About It!
- Ready or Not
- The Real Charlotte
- The Real Story of...
- Really Wild Animals
- Rebecca
- The Rebellion of Young David
- The Red and the Blue
- Red Empire
- The Red Moore Show
- Redwall
- Reilly, Ace of Spies
- Relative Strangers
- Reputations
- The Return of the Antelope
- The Return of Bunjee
- The Return of the Psammead
- The Return of Shelley
- Return to the Magic Library
- Revolting Rhymes
- Rex the Runt (originally aired on SBS)
- Rick Stein's Seafood Odyssey
- Ridley Road
- The Riff Raff Element
- Rigolecole
- Rings on Their Fingers
- The Ripping Friends
- Ripping Yarns
- The Rise and Fall of King Cotton
- Ritter's Cove
- The Rivals of Sherlock Holmes
- A River Somewhere
- Rivers with Griff Rhys Jones
- The Road to War: Great Britain, Italy, Japan, USA
- Road to Now
- Road Rovers
- Roary the Racing Car (later moved to DreamWorks)
- Rob the Robot
- Rob Roy
- Robin Hood
- Robin's Nest
- Robo Story
- Rock Arena
- Rocket Power (originally aired on Ten)
- Rocko's Modern Life (now on Nickelodeon)
- Rockschool
- Rocky and Bullwinkle (originally aired on Seven, Nine and Ten)
- Rocky and the Dodos
- Rocky O'Rourke
- Rod, Jane and Freddy
- Roger and the Rottentrolls
- Roger Ramjet (originally aired on Seven and WIN-TV in Wollongong)
- Roland Rat
- Roland Rat Goes East
- Roland's Winter Wonderland
- Roland's Yuletide Binge
- The Rolf Harris Show
- Rolf's Walkabout
- Roll Over Beethoven
- Rollin' On the River
- The Roman Holidays (later moved to Seven)
- Roobarb
- Roobarb and Custard Too
- Rooftop Rendezvous
- Root Into Europe
- Rose and Maloney
- Rosemary Conley
- Rosie and Jim
- Rosie's Walk
- Rotten Ralph
- Round the Bend
- Royal Heritage
- The Royle Family
- Rubbadubbers
- Rubbery Figures
- A Rubovian Legend
- Rubbish, King of the Jumble
- Ruby Gloom
- Rugrats (temporarily on Ten)
- Rumpole of the Bailey
- Running Scared
- Rupert

==== S ====
- S.W.A.L.K.
- St. Bear's Dolls Hospital (aired only on ABC Kids)
- Saban's Adventures of Oliver Twist
- Sailor
- Sally Bollywood: Super Detective (originally aired on Seven)
- Sali Mali
- Sam and the River
- Sam's Luck
- SamSam
- Sammy J & Randy in Ricketts Lane (2015)
- Sanctuary
- The Santa Claus Brothers
- Santa's First Christmas
- Santo Bugito
- Saturday Night Clive
- Saturday Party
- The Save-Ums!
- Scarf Jack
- Scene
- School's Out
- The Science Cafe
- Science Today
- Science Topics
- The Scientific Eye
- The Scold's Bridle
- Screaming
- The Sculptress
- Sea Dragon
- Sea Princesses
- Sea Trek
- Sea Urchins (later moved to Ten)
- Seaforth
- Seahouse
- Sealab 2020 (later moved to Seven)
- The Search for the Nile
- Search for Success
- Secombe with Music
- Secondary Media
- Second Sight
- Secret Adventures
- Secret Army
- The Secret Diary of Adrian Mole
- Secret Life of Toys
- Secret Oasis
- The Secret River
- The Secret Show
- The Secret of the Sahara
- Secret Squirrel (later moved to Seven)
- The Secret World of Alex Mack
- The Secret World of Polly Flint
- Secrets of the Deep
- Secrets
- See How They Grow
- See How They Run
- Seeing Stars
- Seeing Things
- A Sense of Guilt
- Sensitive Skin
- Seven Deadly Sins
- Sexton Blake and the Demon God
- Shadow Raiders
- Shadows
- Shameless
- Shape, Shape, Shape
- The Shari Lewis Show
- Sharon and Elsie
- The Sharp End
- Sheeep
- Shelley
- Shine on Harvey Moon
- Shirley Abicair in Australia
- Shirley Bassey
- The Shirley Temple Show
- Shoebox Zoo
- Shoestring
- Shoobie Doo
- Shortland Street (originally aired on SBS)
- The Show with the Mouse
- Showtime
- Shrink Rap
- Side by Side
- Sidekick (later moved to Disney XD)
- The Sideshow
- Sierra
- The Silicon Factor
- Silent Witness
- Silly Season Cinema
- Silversun
- Simon and the Witch
- The Simon Gallaher Show
- Simon in the Land of Chalk Drawings
- Simsala Grimm
- Sinbad Jr. and His Magic Belt
- The Singing Detective
- The Sins
- Sir Bernard's Stately Homes
- Sir Francis Drake
- Sir Gadabout: The Worst Knight in the Land
- Sitting Ducks
- Six Australians
- The Six Wives of Henry VIII
- The Six: Titanic's Last Secret
- Skipper and Skeeto
- A Skirt Through History
- Skorpion
- Sky
- The Sky Bike
- Sleek Geeks
- Sleuth 101
- Slim Pig
- Slinger's Day
- Smack the Pony
- Small Potatoes (1999 series)
- Small Room in the House
- Small Stories
- Small World
- Smedley's Weekly
- Smiley's People
- Smith
- The Smoggies
- The Smokey Bear Show
- The Smothers Brothers Show
- Smuggler
- Snailsbury Tales
- Snailympics
- Snip and Snap
- So Haunt Me
- Soap
- Softly, Softly
- Soldiers
- Solo
- Some Mothers Do 'Ave 'Em (later moved to Seven and Ten)
- Something in the Air
- Sometime, Never
- The Sonnets of William Shakespeare
- Sons and Lovers
- Soong Sisters
- Sooty & Co.
- The Sooty Show
- Sooty's Amazing Adventures
- Sophie and Virginia
- Sorrell and Son
- Sorry!
- Soul Music
- Soupe Opera
- South of the Border
- South Side Story
- The Soviet Union
- Sow What
- Space Age
- Space Education
- Space Goofs
- Space on Earth
- Space Patrol
- Spacewatch
- Spare Parts in Performance
- Spartakus and the Sun Beneath the Sea
- The Spectacular Spider-Man
- Speed Buggy
- Speed Racer (later aired on Seven and Ten, returned to air on ABC Kids in 2003 and ABC2 in 2005)
- Spider!
- The Spike Jones Show
- Spirit Bay
- Spirits of the Jaguar
- Spitfire Ace
- Spooky
- The Spooky Sisters
- Sport in Question
- Sportscene
- Spot
- Spot and His Grandparents Go to the Carnival
- Spot's Magical Christmas
- Spot's Musical Adventures
- The Spying Game
- Square One Television
- Stand Up, Nigel Barton
- Stanley Bagshaw
- Stanley's Dragon
- Star Blazers
- Star Wars: The Clone Wars
- Starhill Ponies
- Starsky & Hutch
- State of the Planet
- Stephen Hawking's Universe
- Steptoe and Son
- Stickin' Around
- Sticky Moments
- Stingray
- The Stonecutter
- Stookie
- Storefront Lawyers
- Storm Hawks
- Story Beneath the Sands
- The Story of the Dancing Frog
- Storybreak
- Storymakers
- Storytelling
- The Strange Affair of Adelaide Harris
- The Strange Calls
- Strangers
- Strangers and Brothers
- Streets Apart
- Streetwise
- Strictly Dancing
- Strange Hill High
- Strike It Rich
- Striker
- Striving to Win
- Strumpet City
- Stuart Wagstaff's World Playhouse
- Studio 22
- Studio 86
- Stuff Handmade
- Submarine
- Sugarbunnies
- Supercar
- Supernatural: The Unseen Powers of Animals
- Supersense: Sixth Sense
- SuperTed
- The Super Hero Squad Show
- Surgical Spirit
- Survival with Johnny Cash
- Swallows and Amazons Forever!
- Sweat of the Sun
- The Sweeney
- Sweet Sixteen
- Sweet Seventeen
- The Swish of the Curtain
- Swiss Family Robinson
- Sword Art Online
- Sword of Freedom
- Sydney Grows Up
- Sykes
- Sykes and a...
- Sylvan
- Sylvanian Families

==== T ====
- T-Bag
- Take 5
- Take Kerr
- Take a Look
- Take Me Home
- Take Three
- Takin' Over the Asylum
- Taking The Next Step
- A Tale of Two Cities
- Tales from the Blue Crystal
- Tales from the Darkside
- Tales from the Edge of the World
- Tales From Fat Tulip's Garden
- Tales from Hoffnung
- Tales of India
- Tales of Magic
- Tales of the City
- Tales of the Unexpected
- Tales of the Wizard of Oz
- Tales of Wells Fargo
- Talking Animals
- Talking Eggs
- Talking Pictures
- Tall Poppies
- Target
- Taste for Adventure
- Teacher Haze
- Teacup Travels
- Tears Before Bedtime
- Ted Sieger's Wildlife
- Teddy Trucks
- Teen Scene
- Teenage Fairytale Dropouts (originally aired on Seven)
- Teenage Health Freak
- Tele-Variety
- Telebugs
- Telford's Change
- Teletubbies (original series)
- Teletubbies Everywhere
- Television Parts
- Tell Tale Hearts
- Tender Is the Night
- Tenko
- Terry and Julian
- Terry and the Gunrunners
- Terry on the Fence
- Testament: The Bible in Animation
- That '70s Show (originally aired on Seven)
- The Thick of It
- The Text Files
- Thicker than Water
- The Thin Blue Line
- The Three Robbers
- The Trial of Christine Keeler (originally aired on Foxtel)
- This Day Tonight
- This is Your World
- This Life
- This Sporting Life
- This Year's Model
- Three Little Tramps
- Three Up, Two Down
- Three's Company (later moved to Ten)
- Tightrope
- Till Death Us Do Part
- Time Riders
- Timeframe
- Tinker, Tailor, Soldier, Spy
- Tiny Planets
- Titch
- Titmuss Regained
- To Play the King
- To the Manor Born (later moved to Ten and Seven)
- To Serve Them All My Days
- Toad Patrol
- Today's Special
- ToddWorld
- Tofffsy
- Tom and Vicky
- Tom Brown's School Days
- Tom, Dick and Harriet
- Tom Grattan's War
- The Tomorrow People (1992 version)
- Tomorrow's World
- Tom's Midnight Garden
- The Tony Hancock Show
- Tooth Fairy, Where Are You?
- Tootuff
- Top Chef Junior
- Top Gear
- Top Mates
- Top of the Pops
- Top of the World
- Topo Gigio
- Torchwood
- Torchwood Declassified
- Torchy the Battery Boy
- Torque
- Total Drama (Only seasons 1–5)
- Toucan Tecs
- Total Wipeout
- Touch and Go
- A Touch of Reverence
- Towards 2000
- Towser
- Tracey Takes On...
- The Good Place
- The Tracey Ullman Show
- Tracey Ullman: A Class of Act
- Trails to Adventure
- The Trap Door
- Tree Fu Tom
- Tractor Tom
- Trapped!
- Trapp, Winkle and Box
- A Traveller in Time
- Treasure
- Treasure Island in Outer Space
- The Treasure Seekers
- Treffpunkt: Deutschland
- Trial by Marriage
- The Trials of Life
- The Tribe
- Tripper's Day
- Troublemakers
- The Troubleshooters
- Truckers
- The Truckies
- The True Believers
- True Tilda
- Tucker's Luck
- TUGS
- Tumbledown Farm
- Turtle World
- Tutenstein
- TV Channell
- TV Showboat
- Tweenies
- Twentieth Century History
- Twins of Destiny
- The Twisted Tales of Felix the Cat
- The Two Ronnies (later moved to Seven)
- Tycoon
- The Tyrant King

==== U ====
- Ultraviolet
- Ulysses 31
- Unbeatable Banzuke
- Under the Mountain
- Underbelly (UK series)
- Understanding Newspapers
- Understanding Television
- Understanding Toddlers
- Understanding the Under 12s
- The Unfair Go
- United States of Tara
- Universe with Brian Cox
- University of the Air
- The Unknown Marx Brothers
- Untalkative Bunny
- The Untouchables
- The Untouchables of Elliot Mouse
- Up the Elephant and Round the Castle
- Upper Primary Arts and Crafts
- The Upside Down Show
- Upstairs, Downstairs (later moved to Nine)
- Upstairs, Downstairs Bears
- Ursula's Kiss
- Us

==== V ====
- Vampire Knight
- Vampires, Pirates & Aliens
- Van der Valk
- Van der Valk (2020 reboot)
- A Very Peculiar Practice
- Vicky the Viking
- Victor and Hugo (later moved to 7TWO)
- Victoria Wood As Seen On TV
- Vintage: A History of Wine
- Vision On
- The Vision Thing
- Vital Systems
- Voltron: Defender of the Universe
- Voltron Force
- The Voyages of Doctor Dolittle

==== W ====
- The Wackers
- Waiting for God
- The War That Changed Us
- Warrior Queen
- Warship
- The Watch House
- Watch This Space
- Watch Your Language
- Watching
- Waterloo Road
- Watership Down
- Watt on Earth
- The Way We Lived Now
- Waybuloo
- Wayne and Shuster
- The Ways of Seeing
- The Web
- Welcher & Welcher
- We'll Think of Something
- What-a-Mess
- Whatever Happened to the Likely Lads?
- What's in the Picture
- What's on Next?
- What's Up Doc?: A Salute to Bugs Bunny
- Wheelie and the Chopper Bunch
- The Wheels on the Bus
- When the Boat Comes In
- When the River Was the Only Road
- Where Did the Colorado Go?
- Where's Wally?
- Whistle for Willie
- The White Monkey
- White Peak Farm
- The White Seal
- The Whitehall Worrier
- Who Dares Wins
- Who Pays the Ferryman?
- Who Sir? Me Sir?
- Who Wants to Be a Princess Anyway?
- Who Will Comfort Toffle? (originally aired on SBS)
- Whodunnit?
- Whoops Baghdad
- Why Is It So?
- The Whys and Wherefores
- Widget
- Wide-Eye
- Wil Cwac Cwac
- Wild and Crazy Kids
- Wild at Heart
- Wild Relations
- The Wild Adventures of Blinky Bill (originally aired on 7TWO)
- The Wild Thornberrys
- Wild, Wild World of Animals
- Wilderness to Wisdom
- Wildernuts
- Wildwoods
- Willi Wuhlmouse
- William's Wish Wellingtons
- Willkommen!
- Willo the Wisp
- The Willow Bend Mystery
- The Wind in the Willows (later moved to 7TWO)
- Wind in the Wires
- Windfalls
- Winston Churchill: The Wilderness Years
- Wipe Out
- Wipeout
- The Wire
- The Wisdom of The Gnomes
- The Wish That Changed Christmas
- Witchcraft
- The Witch's Daughter
- Wives and Daughters
- Wodehouse Playhouse
- Wollongong the Brave
- Wolverine and the X-Men
- The Woman Who Raised a Bear as Her Son (originally aired on SBS)
- The Wombles (1973 series)
- The Wombles (1996 series)
- Women at the Top
- Women of Ninja Warrior
- Wonderbox
- The Wonder Years (originally aired on Ten)
- The Wonderful Wizard of Oz
- The Wonderful World of Puppies
- Woobinda
- Woof! (originally aired on Nine, later moved to 7TWO)
- WordGirl
- Words and Pictures
- Words Fail Me
- Worlds Beyond
- World Cultures and Youth
- The World of Beachcomber
- The World of Chemistry
- The World of David the Gnome
- The World of Eric Carle
- The World of Jim Henson
- The World of Pam Ayres
- The World of Peter Rabbit and Friends
- The World, The Flesh and the Devil
- The World We Share
- The Worst Day of My Life
- The Worst Witch
- Worzel Gummidge
- Worzel Gummidge Down Under
- Wow! Wow! Wubbzy!
- The Wubbulous World of Dr. Seuss
- Wynne and Penkovsky
- Wyrd Sisters

==== X ====
- X-DuckX

==== Y ====
- Yakari
- A Year in Provence
- Yes, Honestly
- Yes Minister
- Yes, Prime Minister
- Yes, Virginia, there is a Santa Claus
- Yo Gabba Gabba!
- Yoho Ahoy
- Yoko! Jakamoko! Toto!
- You Can Write Anything
- You Can't Do That on Television
- Young Dracula
- The Young Person's Guide to Becoming a Rock Star
- The Young Ones (later moved to Ten)
- Your Life in Their Hands
- Your Living Body
- Your Mother Wouldn't Like It

==== Z ====
- The Zack Files
- Zardip's Search for Healthy Wellness
- Zoey 101
- Zombie College
- Zombie Hotel
- Zoo 2000
- Zoo Olympics
- Zoo Quest
- Zoom the White Dolphin (later moved to SBS)
- Z-Cars

== See also ==
- List of live television plays broadcast on Australian Broadcasting Corporation (1950s)
- List of programs broadcast by Network 10
- List of programs broadcast by Nine Network
- List of programs broadcast by Special Broadcasting Service
- List of programs broadcast by Seven Network
- List of Australian television series
