= Here Come the Girls =

Here Come the Girls may refer to:

- Here Come the Girls (1918 film), starring Harold Lloyd
- Here Come the Girls (1953 film), starring Bob Hope
- "Here Come the Girls" (song), a song by Ernie K-Doe from 1970
- Here Come the Girls (concert tour), a 2009 concert tour by Chaka Khan, Lulu and Anastacia
- Here Come the Girls (TV series), a 1960 television series
