= Old-Time Ballroom =

- Genre: Variety
- Starring: ABC Melbourne Dance Band
- Country of origin: Australia
- Original language: English
- No. of seasons: 2

Original release
- Network: ABC Television
- Release: 5 September 1959 – January 1960

Old-Time Ballroom was an Australian television variety series which aired on Melbourne station ABV-2 and Sydney station ABN-2 on Saturdays. It originally aired for a four-episode series in September 1959. The program aired an additional series starting December 1959, which ran through to January 1960. It may however have had an additional series in 1961 or later years of the early 1960s.

It was briefly replaced on the schedule by The Saturday Show. The series itself occupied the time-slot previously held by Saturday Party.

Aired live, the series presented a mix of ballroom dancing and music, with each episode featuring the ABC Melbourne Dance Band. Guests who appear during the first series included juggling act The Muracs, Joean Clarke, Clive Hearne, singer June Hamilton, singer Geoff Brooke, singer Des McGee, singer Pat Grierson, trapeze artist Nicky Colcos, dance-caller Bert Cartledge, singer Irene Hewitt, singer John Kelly, and novelty act Tex Glanville.

It is not known if any of the episodes are still extant, given the erratic survival rate of the Australian series of the era. At least one episode is held by the National Film and Sound Archive, along with a second item which may be an episode of the series.
