= Trevor Adamson =

Australian country/gospel singer

Trevor Adamson is an Australian country/gospel singer best known for his song Nyanpi Matilda, a Pitjantjatjara version of Waltzing Matilda.

== Biography ==
He is from Pukatja (Ernabella) in APY Lands of South Australia and sings in both Pitjantjatjara and English. He was the subject of an episode of an ABC TV series, Six Australians. Adamson also featured in episode #1008 of the NITV show "Pmarra Country", an Aboriginal tribute to the legendary Slim Dusty, in which he performed his Pitjantjatjara language version of Slim Dusty's 1972 song "When the Rain Tumbles Down in July".

== Discography ==
- Godaku Walytja-Piti (Gods Family) (1982) with children from Pukatja
- Trust in the Lord (1985) - Imparja
- Where I Belong (1989) - CAAMA
- Waltzing Matilda (1994) - CAAMA
- My Sunburnt Country (2009) - Pindaroo
