= Mainly for Women =

- Genre: Lifestyle
- Presented by: Corinne Kerby
- Country of origin: Australia
- Original language: English

Original release
- Network: ABC Television
- Release: 1961 – 1964

Mainly for Women is an Australian television series which aired 1961 to 1964 on ABC. Hosted by Corinne Kerby, it was a daytime series aimed at women of the period. It was produced in Melbourne and shown interstate, and included segments on subjects such as cooking, fashion and interviews.

== Examples of format ==
In one episode, there was a discussion chaired by Jean Battersby, tips on the game of bowls, the making of bread and buns, and a music interlude. In another episode, the segments included an interview with Joanne Lyne, "Beauty Box", and letters. Another episode featured "Beauty Box", a segment on "malayan cooking", and keep fit exercises.

== See also ==
- Your Home
- The Home Show
- Women's World
- Wonderful World
