= Find the Link =

British and Australian TV game show (1954–1956, 1957–1958)

Find the Link is a game show format which had versions produced in the U.K. and in Australia. It involved a celebrity panel trying to determine the link between contestants. It was quite common at the time for British formats to have versions done for Australian television, with other examples including Picture Page and Café Continental.

== British version ==
Find the Link was a British television programme which aired from 1954 to 1956. Hosts included Peter Martyn (1954–1955), Leslie Mitchell (1955), and Kenneth Home (1955–1956). It aired on the BBC.

== Australian version ==
Find the Link was an Australian television series. It aired from 1957 to 1958 on ABC, and was hosted by Bruce Beeby. Produced and broadcast live in Sydney, the half-hour series also aired in Melbourne via kinescope recordings (also known as telerecordings).

== Episode status ==
An episode of the Australian version is held by National Archives of Australia.

No episodes survive of the U.K. version.
