= Gather Your Dreams =

- Written by: Roger Simpson
- Directed by: Tom Parkinson
- Starring: Kerry McGregor
- Composer: Bernie Allen
- Country of origin: New Zealand
- Original language: English
- No. of seasons: 1
- No. of episodes: 13

Production
- Executive producer: John McRae
- Producer: Roger Le Mesurier
- Cinematography: Michael O'Connor
- Editor: Harley Oliver
- Running time: 25 minutes
- Production company: South Pacific Television

Original release
- Release: September 24 – December 17, 1978

Gather Your Dreams is a 1978 New Zealand television series. It was a 13 episode family series that starred 17 year old Kerry McGregor.

Production of the series was interrupted due to industrial action as it was nearing completion.

The Carter family vaudeville troupe travel New Zealand trying to survive during the Depression. The death of their patriarch changes things for Kitty.

== Cast ==
- Kerry McGregor as Kitty Carter
- Terence Cooper as Wallace Carter
- Bridget Armstrong as Ida
- Charlie Strachan as Zellini
- Gerry Duggan as Moocho
- Ben Clark as Reggie Carter
- Ilona Rodgers as Aunt
- Norman Fletcher as Uncle
- Jennifer Ludlam as Brenda

== Broadcast history ==
Gather Your Dreams debuted in New Zealand on 24 September 1978 on Two. Ireland aired it on RTE-1 beginning on 3 June 1979 and in Australia the ABC broadcast it during their A.R.V.O. wrapper series beginning 8 August 1979.

== Awards ==
New Zealand Feltex Awards 1979

- Best Script - Roger Simpson - won
