= TV Channell =

- Genre: Variety
- Presented by: Douglas Channell
- Country of origin: Australia
- Original language: English

Original release
- Network: ABC Television
- Release: 15 November 1956 – 11 April 1957

TV Channell is an early Australian television that aired live on Sydney station ABN-2 from 15 November 1956 to around 11 April 1957, airing on Thursdays, and starred Douglas Channell. It was replaced on ABN's schedule by The Johnny Gredula Show. Gredula had appeared previously on an episode of TV Channell.

TV Channell was a variety show. An episode broadcast on 7 February 1957 featured regulars pianist Reg Lewis; organist Wilbur Kentwell; singers Margaret Day, Ross Higgins, and Brian Lawrance; fire-eater Ya Yahmen and organist Perc Roberts.

1957-era TV listings suggest that some of the TV Channell episodes were kinescoped for broadcast on Melbourne television station ABV-2, but it is not known if any of these recordings still exist.
