= Beginners, Please =

- Genre: Variety
- Presented by: Gerry Hyman
- Country of origin: Australia
- Original language: English

Production
- Running time: 30 minutes

Original release
- Network: ABV-2
- Release: 27 January – 10 March 1961

Beginners, Please is an Australian television series which aired 1961 on ABC in Melbourne. Hosted by Gerry Hyman, it was a 30-minute live variety show featuring acts who were new to television.

The first episode aired 27 January 1961, while the final episode aired 10 March 1961.
