= Bentley's Bandbox =

- Genre: Variety
- Presented by: Dick Bentley; John Bluthal; Diana Davidson; Hazel Phillips
- Country of origin: Australia
- Original language: English
- No. of episodes: 6

Original release
- Network: ABC
- Release: 16 July – 23 August 1960

Bentley's Bandbox is an Australian television series which aired in 1960 on ABC. It featured Dick Bentley, John Bluthal, Diana Davidson, and Hazel Phillips, and was a variety show. Six episodes were produced, with ABC following the BBC model of having short seasons for its series.

The archival status of the series is not known, though a 1960 newspaper article confirms that telerecordings were made of the series.

== Reception ==
Australian Women's Weekly said of the first episode "it was slick, smooth, beautifully done, despite a couple of first-night technical blues" and complained that the series suffered from a bad time-slot.
