= Six Australians =

Australian documentary series (1984)

Six Australians was an Australian documentary series created by John McGowan for educational television and first broadcast by the ABC in 1984. Each episode showed an Aboriginal Australian telling their story. The subjects were three men and three woman from different careers. They were Cliff Coulthard (heritage ranger), Maurice Rioli (footballer), Freda Glynn (broadcaster), Trevor Adamson (schoolteacher), Sylvia Blanco (office worker) and Neenya Charles (ballet dancer). It won the first Human Rights Media Award in the electronic media section.
