= The Mix (TV series) =

Australian television series

- Country of origin: Australia
- Original language: English

Original release
- Network: Australian Broadcasting Corporation
- Release: 2014 – 27 March 2021

The Mix was an Australian television series about arts, entertainment and culture. It began screening in 2014 on the Australian Broadcasting Corporation. It featured profiles and stories about various entertainment topics.

It was originally presented by James Valentine. Other presenters and contributors have included Zan Rowe, Myf Warhurst, Eddi Sharp, Abdul Abdullah, Eloise Fuss, Carlo Zeccola and Lisa Skerrett. After the final new episode in December 2020, there has only been a single episode of archival material, aired in February 2021. Past episodes are as of September 2021 available on ABC iview. After the last new episode aired on 12 December 2020 (Melbourne Music Week), a series of eight episodes composed of clips from the archives aired from February to March 2021.
