= Showtime (Australian TV series) =

- Genre: Variety
- Starring: Ted Preston
- Country of origin: Australia
- Original language: English

Original release
- Network: ABC Television
- Release: 1959 – 1960

Showtime is an Australian television series which aired on ABC Television from 1959 to 1960. It was a short-lived variety series which featured pianist Ted Preston and other performers. It aired live in Melbourne. It is shown in a 1959 television schedule as airing at 9:00PM, aired against Whitehall Playhouse on HSV-7 (consisting of selections from various American anthology series) and U.S. series The Loretta Young Show on GTV-9 (also an anthology series). It is not known if any of the episodes survive as kinescopes.
