= Music and Dance =

- Genre: Music television
- Presented by: Vija Vetra
- Starring: Robert Wilson
- Country of origin: Australia
- Original language: English
- No. of episodes: 4

Production
- Running time: 30 minutes

Original release
- Network: ABC Television
- Release: 30 August – 11 October 1959

Music and Dance was an Australian television program. The four-part series aired in 1959, broadcast live on Melbourne station ABV-2, part of ABC (it is not known if it was also shown in Sydney). It aired fortnightly on Sundays. Archival status is unknown.

== Overview ==
Each episode featured Latvian dancer Vija Vetra, who was living in Australia at the time. As the title of the series suggests, she danced, and was accompanied by Robert Wilson on the piano.
