= Between Ourselves =

- Genre: Variety
- Starring: Johnny Ladd; Tikki Taylor; Bill Newman; Kevan Johnston; Jillian Hough; Joan Clarke; Phil Lanham
- Country of origin: Australia
- Original language: English

Original release
- Network: ABC Television
- Release: 20 June – 19 September 1963

Between Ourselves is an Australian television variety series which aired on ABC. The first episode aired on 20 June 1963, and the final episode aired 19 September 1963.

The cast included Johnny Ladd, Tikki Taylor, Bill Newman, Kevan Johnston, Jillian Hough, Joan Clarke, and Phil Lanham. Episodes of the series may be held by the National Film and Sound Archive as kinescope recordings.
