= The Meldrum Tapes =

Australian music television show (1986)

The Meldrum Tapes was a weekly Australian music television show hosted by Molly Meldrum. The show was a mixture of interviews (mostly taken from Countdown interviews) and music clips with each episode focussing on a different band or artist. Artist featured included The Rolling Stones, Madonna, Sting, Howard Jones, The Fixx, Simply Red, John Cougar Mellencamp, Simple Minds, Eurythmics, Dragon, Stevie Nicks, Models, Spandau Ballet, Icehouse, Billy Joel and Cyndi Lauper.
