= Shirley Abicair in Australia =

- Genre: Documentary; Music television
- Presented by: Shirley Abicair
- Country of origin: Australia
- Original language: English
- No. of episodes: 6

Production
- Producer: Geoffrey Powell
- Running time: 30 minutes

Original release
- Network: ABC Television
- Release: 23 September 1960

Shirley Abicair in Australia is an Australian television series featuring musician Shirley Abicair which aired in 1960 on ABC. It consisted of six half-hour episodes which were shot on film. In the documentary-type series, Abicair sang songs and interviewed people. One of the episodes was about Sydney.
