= Junior Sports Magazine =

- Genre: Sports
- Presented by: John O'Reilly
- Country of origin: Australia
- Original language: English

Production
- Running time: 30 minutes

Original release
- Network: ABC Television
- Release: 1962 – 1965

Junior Sports Magazine is an Australian television series which aired 1962 to 1965 on ABC Television. It was a sports news and instructional series aimed at young people. The weekly half-hour series was produced in Sydney and hosted by John O'Reilly.

In Melbourne, an episode intended to air on 23 November 1963 was one of two scheduled programs to be dropped as a result of the John F. Kennedy assassination, news reports of which had resulted in other shows not being shown at their intended times.

== See also ==
- List of Australian television series
