= Sydney Grows Up =

- Genre: Documentary
- Country of origin: Australia
- Original language: English
- No. of episodes: 3

Production
- Running time: 30 minutes

Original release
- Network: ABC Television
- Release: 1958 – 1958

Sydney Grows Up is an Australian television series which aired in 1958 on ABC Television. A half-hour three-part documentary, the first and third episodes were live in Sydney (and kinescoped for Melbourne telecast), while the second episode was filmed. The series was about the "growth and development" of Sydney, with the first episode showing the skyline, the second episode showing the inside of buildings, and the third episode being a discussion on time and motion study.
