= Teen Scene (TV series) =

Australian television series

- Genre: Music television
- Presented by: Johnny Chester
- Country of origin: Australia
- Original language: English

Production
- Running time: 30 minutes

Original release
- Network: ABC Television
- Release: 3 October 1964 – 1965

Teen Scene is an Australian television series which aired from 3 October 1964 to 1965 on ABC Television. Produced in Melbourne, it was hosted by Johnny Chester. It was a half-hour music series aimed at teenagers. The series also featured a Hall of Fame segment, and regular bands were The Chessmen and Awgmented Seventh.

In one episode a dance style called "The Cling" was demonstrated.
