= Latin Holiday =

- Genre: Variety
- Presented by: Sergio Fochi
- Country of origin: Australia
- Original language: English
- No. of seasons: 1
- No. of episodes: 8

Production
- Running time: 30 minutes

Original release
- Network: ABC Television
- Release: 9 January – 27 February 1961

Latin Holiday is an Australian television series that aired during 1961 on ABC. A variety series, each episode was set in a different country. Sergio Fochi was the host.

It was broadcast live in Melbourne, and kinescoped for showing on ABC stations. In Melbourne it was preceded on the schedule by U.S. documentary series The 20th Century and followed by U.K. series Daniel Farson Reports.

== Episodes ==
No.	Title	Original release date
1	"Australia"	9 January 1961
2	"Italy"	16 January 1961
3	"Spain"	23 January 1961
4	"France"	30 January 1961
5	"North of the Danube"	6 February 1961
6	"Brazil"	13 February 1961
7	"New York"	20 February 1961
8	"Australia"	27 February 1961
