= Beat of the City =

- Written by: Monte Miller; Virginia Duigan
- Directed by: John Gauci
- Starring: Joanne Simmons
- Country of origin: Australia
- Original language: English
- No. of episodes: 8

Production
- Producer: Christopher Muir

Original release
- Network: ABC
- Release: 30 December 1975 – 16 February 1976

Beat of the City is a 1975 Australian TV series based on the novel by H.F. Brinsmead. It starred Joanne Simmons as 16 year old Raylene who leaves home in the country for a life in the city. It was made with the help of Winlaton, a corrective home for girls (where the series was set) and the Department of Social Welfare. The cast included many people who had not acted before, including staff from Winlaton playing themselves. Originally intended for an early evening slot, it was moved to a graveyard hour wih ABC management became alarmed about the series subject matter.

== Synopsis ==
Raylene Slater, a country girl, moves to the city and finds trouble ending up in a home for girls, making new friends in Sabie Korkoran, Blade O'Reilly and Syd Green.

== Cast ==
- Joanne Simmons
- Robert Hewett
- Robert Ratti
- Liz Ryan
- Bruce Kerr
- Merrilyn Lambert
- Robert Forza
