= Meet (TV series) =

1957 Australian television series

- Genre: Talk show
- Country of origin: Australia
- Original language: English

Production
- Running time: 15 minutes

Original release
- Network: ABC Television
- Release: 1957

Meet is an early Australian television series which aired on ABC during 1957. The series consisted of interviews in a 15-minute time-slot, with a single person interviewed in each episode. It aired live in Melbourne, with telerecordings (also known as kinescope recordings) made of the broadcasts so it could be shown in Sydney. In Melbourne it aired on Mondays. Following the end of the series, it was followed up with an interview series titled People.

Those who were interviewed in the series included Anona Winn, Hal Gye, Samuel Wadhams, Alan Marshall, Ian Clunies-Ross, Myra Roper, John Bechervaise, among others.

A search of the National Archives of Australia website suggests that at least two of the episodes still exist despite the wiping of the era. These episodes are the interviews with Ian Clunies-Ross and Vance Palmer.
