= Melody Time (TV series) =

- Genre: Music
- Presented by: Ormonde Douglas
- Country of origin: Australia
- Original language: English

Original release
- Network: ABV-2
- Release: 1957 – 1959

Melody Time is an early Australian music television series that aired in 1957 on Melbourne station ABV-2. The live show was hosted by singer Ormonde Douglas, who also made guest appearances on other Australian television series of the era.

In 1959 the series aired again for an additional series of six episodes. The first of the 1959 episodes also featured soprano Maureen Boyce and pianist Wendy Pomroy.

It is not known how many episodes still exist, given station practices of the era. A 16mm kinescope recording of the episode aired 26 August 1957 is held by National Archives of Australia.
