= The Vision Splendid =

Australian documentary series (1977)

The Vision Splendid is an Australian documentary series narrated by Ron Iddon and broadcast by the ABC in 1977. It was aiming to increase understanding between the city and the country. The six part series was produced by the ABC and the W. K. Kellogg Rural Adjustment Unit from the University of New England. The series title was taken from a Banjo Patterson poem.
