= Curiosity Quest =

- Starring: Joel Greene
- Country of origin: United States
- Original language: English
- No. of seasons: 9
- No. of episodes: 145 (List of episodes)

Production
- Running time: 28 minutes

Original release
- Network: Syndication/Local PBS stations
- Release: July 16, 2004 – May 4, 2018

Curiosity Quest is an educational family program hosted by Joel Greene. There are currently 145 episodes and 9 seasons.

== Episodes ==
=== Season 1 (2004–2006) ===
1. Natural History Museum (July 16, 2004)
2. USA Gymnastics (July 30, 2004)
3. Laymon's Candy (October 1, 2004)
4. K-9 Police Dogs (October 8, 2004)
5. LA's Natural History Museum (October 15, 2004)
6. Reptile Show (November 5, 2004)
7. Bowling (November 12, 2004)
8. Candy Canes (December 3, 2004)
9. BMX Biking (January 14, 2005)
10. Sea Lion Show (January 28, 2005)
11. Japanese Taiko Drumming (February 18, 2005)
12. Green Mountain Ranch (March 4, 2005)
13. Newspaper (March 18, 2005)
14. Race Cars: California Speedway (March 25, 2005)
15. Speedway (April 29, 2005)
16. LA Avengers Arena Football (May 6, 2005)
17. Marble Slab Creamery (June 3, 2005)
18. Renaissance Faire (June 10, 2005)
19. Raging Waters (June 17, 2005)
20. Fire Fighter Part 1 (July 1, 2005)
21. Animal Shelter (August 26, 2005)
22. Farm Animals (September 9, 2005)
23. Get Milk (September 16, 2005)
24. Krispy Kreme Doughnuts (October 28, 2005)
25. Wonder Bread Factory (November 18, 2005)
26. Natural History Museum (November 25, 2005)
27. Laymon's Candy Company (December 2, 2005)
28. Giving Show (December 9, 2005)
29. Dog Training (January 13, 2006)
30. Fire Fighter, Part 2 (January 20, 2006)
31. USA Gymnastics (March 24, 2006)
32. Ice Skating (April 7, 2006)
33. Water Recycling (May 19, 2006)
34. Bird Farm (July 7, 2006)
35. California Missions (July 13, 2006)
36. The Surfing Show (July 20, 2006)

=== Season 2 (2006–2008) ===
1. Farm Animals (September 8, 2006)
2. Go Karts (October 6, 2006)
3. Rugby (October 20, 2006)
4. Recycling (October 27, 2006)
5. Pottery (November 3, 2006)
6. Police Helicopter (November 10, 2006)
7. Home Building (November 17, 2006)
8. Money (December 1, 2006)
9. Legoland (December 15, 2006)
10. Habitat 4 Humanity; Diabetes Walk (December 22, 2006)
11. Tiger Rescue (December 29, 2006)
12. Water Bottling (January 5, 2007)
13. Sport Fishing (March 9, 2007)
14. Police Dogs (August 9, 2007)
15. Glass Blowing (September 20, 2007)
16. Honeys (September 27, 2007)
17. Hot Air Balloons (October 4, 2007)
18. Boy Scouts (October 11, 2007)
19. Metro Link Trains (October 18, 2007)
20. Knott's Berry Farm (October 25, 2007)
21. Skateboards (November 1, 2007)
22. Rescue Dogs (November 8, 2007)
23. Police (November 15, 2007)
24. Christmas Trees in Live Oak Canyon (November 22, 2007)
25. Construction Equipment (November 29, 2007)
26. Fender Guitars (December 13, 2007)
27. U.S. Postal Service (February 29, 2008)
28. Dolphins (March 21, 2008)
29. Whale Watching (May 9, 2008)
30. Bracken Bird Farm (May 23, 2008)

=== Season 3 (2008–2009) ===
1. Snowboards (October 3, 2008)
2. Von Dutch (October 10, 2008)
3. Jelly Belly (October 17, 2008)
4. Circus Vargas (October 24, 2008)
5. Ben and Jerry's (October 31, 2008)
6. Vermont Teddy Bear (November 7, 2008)
7. DW Drums (November 14, 2008)
8. Pet Grooming (November 21, 2008)
9. Sandcastle (November 28, 2008)
10. Motor Coach (December 5, 2008)
11. Pianos (December 12, 2008)
12. Challenge Course (January 9, 2009)
13. Chef (January 16, 2009)

=== Season 4 (2010) ===
1. Cheese (March 2, 2010)
2. Cranberries (March 9, 2010)
3. Karate (March 16, 2010)
4. Arena Floor (March 23, 2010)
5. Safety Training (March 30, 2010)
6. Guide Dogs (April 6, 2010)
7. Snow Making (April 13, 2010)
8. Cakes (April 20, 2010)
9. Fire Fighting Training (April 27, 2010)
10. Pizza (May 4, 2010)
11. Harlem Globetrotters (May 11, 2010)
12. Rock Climbing (May 18, 2010)
13. Cheeses (May 25, 2010)

=== Season 5 (2011) ===
1. Horseback Riding (September 8, 2011)
2. Bakery (September 15, 2011)
3. Bike Making (September 22, 2011)
4. Cheerleading (September 29, 2011)
5. Moonridge Animal Park (October 6, 2011)
6. Movie Animatronics (October 13, 2011)
7. Orange Packing (October 20, 2011)
8. Gentle Giants Rescue (October 27, 2011)
9. Mrs. Fields Cookies (November 3, 2011)
10. Plate Making (November 10, 2011)
11. Bowling Balls (November 17, 2011)
12. Salmon Hatchery (December 1, 2011)
13. Behind the Scenes (December 8, 2011)

=== Season 6 (2012) ===
1. Helicopter Making (May 7, 2012)
2. Monterey Aquarium (May 14, 2012)
3. Alaskan Adventure (May 21, 2012)
4. Toothpaste (May 28, 2012)
5. Dig This Construction Fun (June 4, 2012)
6. Drum Sticks (June 11, 2012)
7. Mushrooms (June 18, 2012)
8. Braille Publisher (June 25, 2012)
9. Bed Making (July 2, 2012)
10. Dog Sledding (July 9, 2012)

=== Season 7 (2013) ===
1. Mirrors (July 8, 2013)
2. Goat Farming (July 10, 2013)
3. Race Car Building (July 12, 2013)
4. A Day on the Farm (July 15, 2013)
5. Ice Sculpting (July 17, 2013)
6. Banjo Making (July 19, 2013)
7. Corn Chips (October 30, 2013)
8. Penguins (November 1, 2013)
9. Tofu (November 4, 2013)
10. Stickers (November 6, 2013)

=== Season 8 (2015) ===
1. Making Wool (July 8, 2015)
2. Sugar Crane (July 10, 2015)
3. Hawaiian Adventure (July 13, 2015)
4. Spiders (July 15, 2015)
5. Olives (July 17, 2015)
6. How Are Tools Made? (July 20, 2015)
7. How Are Boats Made? (July 22, 2015)
8. How to Make Skateboards (July 24, 2015)
9. Bird Training (July 27, 2015)

=== Season 9 (2016–2018) ===
1. Solar Boats (December 9, 2016)
2. Making Candles (March 8, 2017)
3. Tortilla Chips (March 10, 2017)
4. Almonds (July 12, 2017)
5. Baseball Bats (December 1, 2017)
6. Alpaca Farm (December 4, 2017)
7. Growing Rice (December 6, 2017)
8. Ostrich Farm (December 8, 2017)
9. How to Make a Bus (December 11, 2017)
10. Making Furniture (December 13, 2017)
11. Food Waste (May 4, 2018)
