= Nature Notebook =

- Genre: Educational television
- Country of origin: Australia
- Original language: English

Original release
- Network: ABC Television
- Release: 1958 – 1958

Nature Notebook is an Australian television series which aired in 1958 on ABC Television. The educational series was intended for schools and aired live in Melbourne on Wednesdays, but the episodes were kinescoped and shown at 7:30PM on Thursdays. Six episodes were produced, subject matters included Australian mammals, and the importance and functions of teeth. It may have also been shown in Sydney.
