= Science Today =

- Genre: Educational television
- Country of origin: Australia
- Original language: English

Original release
- Network: ABC Television
- Release: 1958 – 1958

Science Today is an Australian television series which aired in 1958 on ABC. It was an educational series for schools, with subjects including the magnifying glass and microscope, the weather bureau, animal life found at the seashore, among others. It aired at 3:30PM on Wednesdays in Melbourne, and aired live. At least some of the episodes were also shown in Sydney (presumably via kinescopes).

Produced by ABC's Melbourne station, it was produced in the Rippon Lea studios, and expected to reach 1600 children in 40 schools. However, in Melbourne the episodes were also shown in the evening on Thursdays (presumably via kinescope recordings), thus giving the series a much wider potential audience. TV listings show these evening broadcasts at 7:30PM, aired against imported series Passport to Danger on HSV-7 and The Perry Como Show on GTV-9.
