= Tomorrow's World (1959 TV series) =

- Genre: Educational television
- Country of origin: Australia
- Original language: English

Production
- Running time: 20 minutes

Original release
- Network: ABC Television
- Release: 1959 – 1959

Tomorrow's World is a 1959 Australian educational television series. Intended to be viewed in schools, it aired on ABC Television in a 20-minute time-slot. Subject matters included plankton, a game between an "electronic brain" and a group of children, and atomic power. It is not known if any of the episodes still exist, given the wiping of the era. The series was part of ABC's experiments which began in 1958 to see whether television could be used to provide educational programming for viewing in classrooms. The programming was produced by the Sydney and Melbourne stations of ABC, who shared their programs with each other via kinescopes/telerecordings made of the shows. It is not known when these classroom series began being shown on ABC's stations in other cities. They were among the earliest documentary television series produced for Australian television.
