= The Evie Hayes Show =

- Genre: Variety
- Starring: Evie Hayes
- Country of origin: Australia
- Original language: English
- No. of seasons: 2
- No. of episodes: 20

Production
- Running time: 30 minutes

Original release
- Network: ABC Television
- Release: 4 July 1960 – 28 May 1962

The Evie Hayes Show is an Australian television variety series starring vocalist Evie Hayes. The half-hour series debuted on 4 July 1960 and ran a season of eight episodes on Melbourne station ABV-2, and was also shown on ABN-2 in Sydney (it is not known if it was shown on ABC's stations in other cities). ABC variety series of the era had intentionally shorter seasons than those on commercial television in Australia.

The series aired live, with musical backing by the ABC Melbourne Dance Band.

Other performers who appeared on the series included Reg Grey, Joan Clarke, Raymond McDonald, Verona Cappadona, Frankie Davidson, The Unichords, Alan Eddy, Annette Klooger, Barry Purcell, Will Mahoney, June Barton, Ian Williams, Gaynor Bunning, Tony Jenkins, Graeme Bent, Clive Hearne, Fay Agnew, Bob Garrity, Johnny Marco, and Margaret Becker.

In 1962, the series was revived for an additional set of episodes.
