= Living Tomorrow =

Living Tomorrow is an internationally operating research organization that realizes projects around living and working in the future. Their latest 'innovation campus' opened September 15th, 2023 and is located in Brussels.

== About Living Tomorrow ==
Since 1991, Living Tomorrow started as 'the House of the Future' but is nowadays engaged in projects about the future of mobility, healthcare, smart homes, smart buildings and smart cities. It acts as a future-oriented research institution and as a marketing and co-creation platform for companies, governments and organizations.

Living Tomorrow's spin-out organisation TomorrowLab provides consultancy services to organisations and companies in connection with strategy, innovation and foresight.

== Innovations ==
Living Tomorrow demonstrates various innovations and innovative products.

=== Examples ===
- The first home automation systems (Teletask & Philips - 1995)
- Google Earth look-a-like travel applications (Thomas Cook & Sunjets - 1996)
- Barcode readers to order your groceries (Carrefour & Zetes - 1996)
- Recycling of PMD/residual waste (Fost Plus -1997)
- Smart doorbells (Siedle - 1997)
- Electrochromic blackout windows (Saint-Roch - 1997)
- The smart mailbox for e-commerce and pack stations (DHL - 2001)
- The first banking app (ING, 2003)
- Self-checkout in the supermarket (Delhaize - 2007)
- Smart energy meters (Eandis & Engie - 2010)
- The ambulance drone (TUDelft - 2012)
- Solar charging for EVs (ABB - 2013)
- AI Digital Twin for Health Checkup (Medtronic - 2020)
- Storing CO_{2} in concrete (Holcim Lafarge – 2022)
- Holographic interactive building model in 4D BIM (Schüco – 2022)
- Using drone light shows as a sustainable alternative to fireworks (Drones-and-Lights – 2023)
- AI avatars that guide you through your diabetes care journey (UZGent - Living Tomorrow - 2024)
- Intelligent mirror that performs over 100 health measurements in just one minute (MedicaVisie - 2025)

== Origins and history ==
Early years

In 1990, Frank Beliën started the Living Tomorrow project. Driven by questions such as: "How is technology changing our lives? How will we live, work and spend our lives tomorrow? In 1994, Joachim De Vos came on board and in 1995 the first "House of the Future" opened. The project was officially opened on 16 March 1995 by, among others, Bill Gates, then CEO of Microsoft, and Belgian Prime Minister Jean-Luc Dehaene. At the start, it was promised that a new complex would be built every five years, which is what has actually happened up to the present day.

House of the Future, Living Tomorrow I (1995-2000) The first "House of the Future" was built in Vilvoorde, next to the Ring of Brussels exit 6. It had 163 participating organisations and received 300,000 visitors during its term. It introduced the world to home automation, barcode scanners, solar panels, world-wide web services, Belgium's first website, 100MB LAN, the first ISDN videoconferencing, ADSL, the mobile phone and the laptop. The architecture was also progressive due to the use of then innovative materials such as aerated concrete, laminate cladding and a zinc roof without cavity. The architecture was developed entirely in 3D by Androme (Hasselt University).

Living Tomorrow II (2000-2005)

In 2000, in addition to the first building, a new and larger complex was built, Living Tomorrow 2. It included a new House of the Future and an Office of the Future. More than 97 companies participated and the number of visitors rose to 550,000. Numerous innovations were presented for the first time: interactive TV, IP telephony, voice recognition, delivery box and the electric car.

Living Tomorrow Amsterdam (2004-2009)

In 2004, Living Tomorrow opened a building in Amsterdam. The project was built with the help of the Dutch government and 40 larger companies. 750,000 visitors came to see it. The revolutionary 'blup' architecture used, in collaboration with UNStudio's and Ben van Berkel, set a new building trend in motion and is still an eye-catcher today. Currently, the building is being used by a Dutch bank.

Living Tomorrow III (2007-2012)

At the same location of the previous building in Vilvoorde, a new project was realized. More than 120 building innovations were used (mainly plastic materials). This can still be seen in the typical blue shell at the front of the building. The big eye-catcher was the kitchen of the future, designed by Zaha Hadid, titled the Z-Island. The technological tour de force was exhibited at the Guggenheim Museum in New York shortly before the opening. Since then, the futuristic furniture has been on display at Living Tomorrow. The project received 70 partners and 500,000 visitors.

Living Tomorrow IV (2012-2017)

Living Tomorrow 4 consisted of 2 subprojects. The first part included the further expansion of the existing Living Tomorrow 3 building with new demonstrations on smart cities and electric mobility. As well as the energy landscape, the store and healthcare of the future. These demonstrations were visualisations of the future research of sister organisation Tomorrowlab, a consultancy for strategy and innovation. They were carried out in close cooperation with companies such as Colruyt Group, ABB, De Lijn, Randstad and bpost.

A second part involved the realisation of a 'living lab' in Heusden-Zolder: the Care Home of the Future. The project ran between 2013 and 2016 and included an innovative assisted living home, an innovative care room and a pharmacy of the future. In addition, technologies and services were integrated into a residential care centre that accommodated 200 senior citizens. That project also introduced many innovations: remote diagnosis via an intelligent mirror, a 24/7 pharmacy robot, polypill, and a synthetic floor in the bathroom. The project had 90 participants and provided awareness, research and development.

== Living Tomorrow Innovation campus, version V (2023 - 2028) ==
Living Tomorrow became now an innovation campus located in Brussels, Belgium. With an investment of approximately €40 million, the campus officially opened September 2023. In addition to its demo center, Living Tomorrow now also features a hotel, two restaurants, a fast-charging station, and a fully equipped event center. The event facilities include 10 meeting rooms, an event hall, and an auditorium for up to 150 people.

== Sources ==
- "Living Tomorrow's website
- website TomorrowLab
- website Sapor Restaurant
- website Voco Hotel Brussels-North
- BBC News Video article- "Inside the House of the Future"
