= Wonderful World (Australian TV series) =

Australian TV series, 1959–1960

Wonderful World was an Australian television series. Broadcast on HSV-7, the series aired from 30 July 1959 to 15 October 1959 on Thursdays, then on Mondays from 19 October 1959 to 1 August 1960, replaced with popular game show Lady for a Day.

A daytime programme for the housewife, the first season was hosted by Danny Webb, while the second season was hosted by Brian Naylor. Regulars during the second season included organist Shirley Radford, and Roy Lyons. By 1960 regulars included Jocelyn Terry, Jean Battersby, Madeline Burke, Frank Wilson, and Anne Lane. Later, the regulars also included Guido Lorraine.

U.S. orchestra leader Percy Faith appeared as a guest in a 1960 episode.
