= Australian Wildlife (TV series) =

- Genre: Documentary film
- Created by: Graham Pizzey
- Directed by: Nandor Jenes
- Narrated by: Peter Wagner
- Country of origin: Australia
- Original language: English
- No. of episodes: 5

Production
- Running time: 30 minutes

Original release
- Network: ABC Television
- Release: 7 July – 4 August 1963

Australian Wildlife is an Australian television series which aired in 1963 on ABC. It devised by Graham Pizzey, directed by Nandor Jenes and narrated by Peter Wagner. It debuted 7 July 1963 and consisted of five half-hour episodes, each looking at a different aspects of Australian fauna in Victoria. It was filmed in Victoria and the islands off the south-east coast. It was a documentary series about Australian wildlife.

== Episodes ==
No.	Title	Original release date
1	"Offspring of Isolation"	7 July 1963
Features the soft-billed platypus, spiny ant-eater, possum and flying possum.
2	"Flooded Forest"	14 July 1963
Features the Barmah Forest, which is the breeding ground for the egret.
3	"Appointment at Seal Rocks"	21 July 1963
Set on a small island near to Phillip Island, this episode features seals.
4	"Pastures of the Sea"	28 July 1963
Set on Phillip Island, this episode features the fairy penguin, muttonbird and plankton.
5	"The Australian Mallee"	4 August 1963
Set in the Mallee region, this episode features the spotted bowerbird.
