= Seeing Stars (TV series) =

- Genre: Variety
- Country of origin: Australia
- Original language: English

Original release
- Network: ABV-2
- Release: 1957 – 18 May 1959

Seeing Stars was an Australian television variety series which aired live from 1957 to 1959 on Melbourne station ABV-2 (it is not known if it was also telerecorded for broadcast in Sydney). The series featured a mix of singers, dancers, vocal groups, and instrumental groups. Some episodes were "themed", for example 27 April 1959 episode featured a calypso theme while 16 September 1957 featured a French night club setting. The final episode aired 18 May 1959.

An episode of this series may be held by the National Archives of Australia (per a search of their website).
