= Wayzgoose (TV series) =

- Starring: Jon Stephens; Michael Caulfield; John Summers; Deborah Kennedy; Michael Salmon
- Country of origin: Australia
- Original language: English
- No. of seasons: 1
- No. of episodes: 9

Production
- Executive producer: Jon Stephens
- Producer: Brian Sudding
- Running time: 30 minutes

Original release
- Network: ABC
- Release: 1978 – 1978

Wayzgoose is an Australian children's television series that aired on the ABC in 1978. The nine episode series was a collection of songs and sketches touching on many different topics such as growing up, bullies, divorce, an alcoholic father, sibling rivalry and death. The creative team included Jon Stephens, Michael Caulfield, John Summers, Deborah Kennedy and Michael Salmon. The show was considered controversial and reviews were largely negative. Kate Dunstan of The Age wrote "Wayzgoose is a fast succession of short clips which vary greatly in quality, style and content. Some of these segments are funny, a few are even original and educational, but most of them are sick, overdone and old hat."
