= The Ken Noyle Show =

Australian variety TV show

- Genre: Variety
- Presented by: Ken Noyle
- Country of origin: Australia
- Original language: English

Production
- Running time: 30 minutes

Original release
- Network: ABC Television
- Release: 24 May 1958 – 1958

The Ken Noyle Show is an Australian television variety series which aired on ABC Television. A half-hour variety series, in Sydney (on ABN-2) it aired on Thursdays, while in Melbourne (on ABV-2) it typically aired on Wednesdays.

In Melbourne the first episode aired on 24 May 1958, with guests including Beryl Meekin, Red Moore, vocalist Paul Miskell and Jancece, with competition in the 9:30PM time-slot including a feature film on HSV-7 and the first half of The Astor Show on GTV-9. Later during the run of the series it aired at 9:00PM, competed against talent programme Stairway to the Stars on HSV-7, and American sitcom Susie on GTV-9. At that point the programme was preceded on ABV-2's schedule by Faraway Look and followed by documentary series Panorama.

It is not known if any kinescope recordings exist of the series, given the erratic survival rate of ABC's 1950s-era programming.
