= New Look at New Guinea =

- Genre: documentary
- Narrated by: Maslyn Williams
- Country of origin: Australia
- Original language: English
- No. of episodes: 6

Production
- Production company: Australian Commonwealth Film Unit

Original release
- Network: ABC Television
- Release: 1959

New Look at New Guinea is an Australian television documentary mini-series which was filmed in 1959. Produced by the Australian Commonwealth Film Unit and aired on ABC, it was a six-part series. The episodes are held by the National Archives of Australia (per a search of their website).

== Episode list ==
1. Election Day at Maprik
2. Great Day at Goroka
3. Big Village
4. Missionaries and Coconuts
5. Pioneers on Patrol
6. Men of Two Worlds
