= Strictly Dancing =

- Presented by: Paul McDermott
- Country of origin: Australia
- Original language: English
- No. of seasons: 3

Production
- Running time: 30 minutes

Original release
- Network: ABC TV
- Release: 13 February 2004 – 18 November 2005

Related
- Dancing with the Stars (2004–2015, 2019–present)

Strictly Dancing is an Australian television show that aired between 2004 and 2005 on ABC TV. The show was a joint production of Endemol Southern Star and Australian Broadcasting Corporation. Hosted by Paul McDermott, the show is a form of dance competition, with each episode featuring four dance couples from around Australia and New Zealand. The competition has three rounds, each consisting of two similar dance types. The styles range from basic ballroom dances, such as Cha-Cha and Rumba, to modern styles of Hip-Hop, to strange hybrids.

Competitors are picked via auditioning, which is done around Australia before each season. Chosen competitors are alerted three weeks in advance of their appearance of their dances and competition date (to give all competitors the same amount of time to learn a routine). Whilst the actual show is only a half-hour segment and appears to be live, the creation takes over eight hours and competitors usually have ample time to return home and watch themselves on TV, and as such are made to sign a contract forbidding them from revealing their final position.

Scoring is done by three judges, with the score out of 10 (with up to one decimal place) for each dance, with the average of the three being the score. All scores are then added up. On top of the dance score, the judges award the dances at the end of the show with an X-Factor score. This score has no relation to the technical side of the dancing, but relates to the other factors that improve the dance, such as dancers compatibility or energy. This makes things more interesting as a technically better dance couple may lose to a couple who appeared more captivating or simply 'worked better' together. The winner of the round qualifies for the semi-finals. The winner of the finals receives a cash prize and a flower bouquet. The runners up receive a cash prize of half the first prize amount.

The show has drawn both acclaim and criticism. Traditionalists have criticised the show for its sometimes bizarre dance combinations and newer dances, whereas others praise it for testing out dancers versatility and adaptability to new styles. The show is also regarded to have started a new interest in dancing as a sport, with the Seven Network introducing its own dancing show Dancing with the Stars, in which celebrities with no dance background are partnered with a professional dancer.

The show features its own house band who play the music to which the dancers perform, with a variety of music being used. Voice-over commentary is provided during the dancing by two commentators consisting of Angela Gilltrap and actor Lex Marinos, as in sports broadcasting, with a selected highlight being repeated at the end of the round. At the end of each show, the live studio audience is invited to come onto the floor and dance. The show had three seasons, two in 2004 and one 2005.

The Season Two Grand Final was a one-hour show that aired on ABC television on 26 November 2004. Four couples had reached the Grand Final, all from New South Wales. Dancers on the show were only known by their first names (female partner being named first and the male partner second) and their team number which was assigned through the season. The four teams in this Grand Final were: Team 034 Nikki and Gabriel; Team 053 Masha and Matthew; Team 102 Luba and Csaba; and Team 161 Kelly and Ron.

At the end of the Grand Final competition the final scores and placings were:

Grand Final scores and placings 2004
Ranking	Team	Dance Score	X Factor Score	Total Score
1	102 Luba and Csaba	50.7	17.7	68.4
2	034 Nikki and Gabriel	49.8	17.3	67.1
3	053 Masha and Matthew	49.5	17.3	66.8
4	161 Kelly and Ron	46.5	16.0	62.5
