= Let's Go Square Dancing =

- Genre: Variety
- Presented by: Jim Vickers-Willis
- Country of origin: Australia
- Original language: English

Production
- Running time: 30 minutes

Original release
- Network: ABC Television
- Release: 1960

Let's Go Square Dancing is an Australian television series which aired in 1960 on ABC TV. The half-hour series featured square-dancing, with Jim Vickers-Willis as the caller. The series aired live. It was produced in Melbourne, and kinescoped for broadcast in Sydney (and possibly other ABC stations). It is not known if any of these kinescope recordings still exist.
