= Alexander Bunyip's Billabong =

Australian children's television series

Alexander Bunyip's Billabong is an Australian television series for children which screened on the ABC from 1978 to 1988. It followed the adventures of Alexander Bunyip, a mythical Australian creature who first appeared in "The Monster..." book series and later the "Alexander Bunyip" book series.

== Cast ==
- Ron Blanchard as Ron
- Jane Fennell as Jane
- Mike Meade as Alexander Bunyip

== Alexander Bunyip ==
Alexander Bunyip first appeared in the book "The Monster That Ate Canberra", written and illustrated by Michael Salmon in 1972. This was followed up by "Son of the Monster" in 1973, "Travels with the Monster" in 1974 and "The Monster in Space" in 1975. The character later appeared in "Alexander Bunyip" and "Alexander Bunyip and the Swagman" both published in 1980.

The character appeared on television beginning in 1979 with ARVO (Alexander's Recycled Visual Offerings) and then in various formats such as "The Alexander Bunyip Show", "Alexander's Afternoon", "Alexander's Antics" and "Alexander Bunyip's Billabong". Some episodes from The Alexander Bunyip Show were repeated as part of the 1982 anthology series Silly Season Cinema. The scripts for the television series were written by Mike Meade and Ron Blanchard.

== See also ==
- List of Australian television series
- List of longest-running Australian television series
- Alexander Bunyip, Canberra, bronze statue
