= The Johnny Gredula Show =

- Genre: Variety
- Presented by: Johnny Gredula
- Country of origin: Australia
- Original language: English

Original release
- Network: ABC Television
- Release: 18 April 1957 – 20 February 1958

The Johnny Gredula Show is an Australian television variety series which aired from 18 April 1957 to 20 February 1958 on ABC. Produced in Sydney, the series also aired in Melbourne via kinescope recordings (also known as telerecordings). Regulars included the Noel Gilmore Quintet and Margaret Day.

The episode broadcast on 18 April 1957 in Sydney competed in the time-slot against Turf Guide on TCN-9 and Sydney Tonight on ATN-7

In an episode that was telecast in Melbourne on 20 June 1957, the competition in the time-slot consisted of U.S. series Big Town on HSV-7 and a local version of novelty game show Pantomime Quiz on GTV-9.

The archival status of the series is unknown. The episode broadcast in Sydney on 3 October 1957 is held by the National Archives of Australia but is not available for viewing.
