= The Saturday Show (Australian TV series) =

- Genre: Variety
- Presented by: Shirley Broadway; Rosemary Butler; Bambi Smith
- Country of origin: Australia
- Original language: English

Original release
- Network: ABV-2
- Release: 3 October 1959

The Saturday Show was an Australian live variety television series that aired for three months during 1959 on Melbourne's ABC Television station ABV-2. It was originally hosted by Shirley Broadway, later by Rosemary Butler, and finally by Bambi Smith. It debuted 3 October 1959.

One episode featured as guests pianist Ted Preston, saxophonist Eddie Oxley, vocal group The Moontones, and vocalists Reg Gray and Betty Bally.
