= Saturday Party =

- Genre: Variety
- Presented by: Bob Cornish
- Country of origin: Australia
- Original language: English

Production
- Running time: 45 minutes

Original release
- Network: ABV-2
- Release: February 1959 – August 1959

Saturday Party was an Australian television variety series which aired on Melbourne station ABV-2 in 1959, running from February to August. The series aired in a 45-minute time slot.

== Program synopsis ==
Hosted by Bob Cornish and often a co-host such as Jocelyn Terry or Corinne Kerby, regulars included the Mamie Reid Ensemble. People who made guest appearances during the run of the series included pianist John Doyle, singer Pat Grierson, singer Ken Brown, singer Judy Banks, singer Frankie Davidson, singer Heather Horwood, the Victorian Trumpet Trio, comedian Lloyd Cunnington, accordion player Alan Paul, soprano Joy Mammen, comedy duo Wilson and Carr (who made several appearances), accordion player Lorraine Bransgrove, singer Joy Grisold, singer Graeme Bent, baritone Bill Tichner, singer Lee de Coney, dancers Max Bond and Norma Connolly, magician Rids van der Zee, singer Eunice McGowan, singer Max Blake, Don Snibert, acrobatic team Duo Sylvanos, singer Joan Clarke, singer Irene Hewitt, magician Caffarl, and rope spinner Tex Granville.

An episode of this series may be held by the National Archives of Australia
