= Picture Page (Australian TV series) =

- Genre: News magazine
- Presented by: Valerie Cooney
- Country of origin: Australia
- Original language: English

Production
- Running time: 30 minutes

Original release
- Network: ABC Television
- Release: 1956 – 1957

Picture Page is an early Australian television series which aired from 1956 to 1957 on ABC. It was hosted by Valerie Cooney.

The half-hour prime-time series was of a magazine format. In the 19 April 1957 episode, the program presented Donald McMichael, curator of shells in the Australian Museum, who showed shell specimens. The 9 August 1957 edition featured Pat Spencer, a vocalist, along with "leading Sydney models".

R. C. Packer in the magazine The Australian Women's Weekly gave the show a positive review, saying "it has an off-beat attractiveness".

Aired live in Sydney, by some point in 1957 the series was aired in Melbourne via telerecordings, also known as kinescope recordings. It is not known if any of these 16mm film recordings still exist.
