= Here Come the Girls (TV series) =

- Genre: Variety
- Presented by: Ruth Nye
- Country of origin: Australia
- Original language: English

Production
- Running time: 30 minutes

Original release
- Network: ABV-2
- Release: 25 January 1960

Here Come the Girls was a short-lived Australian television variety series which aired in early 1960 on ABC station ABV-2. Hosted by Ruth Nye, the cast of the first episode of the weekly series included vocalist Paula Langlands, soprano Madge Stephens, and pianists Joy Mitchell and Wendy Pomroy. As the title suggests, the main focus of the series was on female performers. There is no information available as to whether any of the episodes are still extant.

== Reception ==
Reviewing the first episode, The Age considered the series to be "a big disappointment". The writer for the newspaper said that Wendy Pomroy's piano item was entertaining, but that "Elsewhere was chaos for a channel which has a record for the presentation of above-average variety of the more dignified type" and stated the second episode showed no improvement.
