= Punky (TV series) =

- Genre: Children
- Created by: Lindsay J. Sedgwick
- Written by: Andrew Brenner
- Directed by: Simon Crane
- Starring: Aimée Richardson; Maureen Ward; Bradley Burke; Paul Tylak
- Composer: John Atkinson
- Country of origin: Ireland
- Original language: English
- No. of series: 2
- No. of episodes: 40

Production
- Producer: Gerard O'Rourke
- Running time: 7 minutes
- Production companies: Monster Animation & Design

Original release
- Network: RTÉjr on RTÉ Two
- Release: 3 May 2011 – present

Punky is an Irish animated television series created by Lindsay J. Sedgwick and produced by Dublin based Monster Animation and Design. The series features the lead character as having Down syndrome, with the intention of being the first animated series to do so.

== Development ==
The show's creative director is Jason Tammemagi, who has been involved in a number of animated shows for pre-school children, including Fluffy Gardens.

The series is produced with the support of Down Syndrome Ireland, who also reviewed material during development and production of the series. The series is supported by investment incentives from the Government of Ireland (Section 481), in association with RTÉjr, with the participation of the Irish Film Board and the Broadcasting Authority of Ireland’s Sound & Vision Fund. A second series (also 20 x 7 mins) was launched in February 2014.

== Characters ==
Punky relates tales from the everyday life of a six-year-old little girl who has Down syndrome. Punky is characterized as a happy little girl who, as explained in the introduction of the show, loves "music", "dancing" and "hugs". She is shown to like to play with her older brother, "Con", and her dog, "Rufus". She also tries to make her grandmother, "Cranky", "just a little less cranky".

The lead character is voiced by Aimée Richardson, a voice actress who has Down syndrome.

== Broadcast ==
It aired in a number of TV networks in the UK, Australia, Germany and Sweden to screen the show. An Irish language version of the show was produced, it aired on TG4.
