= Great (1975 film) =

1975 British film by Bob Godfrey

- Title card of the film
- Directed by: Bob Godfrey
- Written by: Colin Pearson (uncredited), Bob Godfrey, Richard Taylor, Joe McGrath, Robin Smyth, Paul Weisser
- Produced by: Ron Inkpen (uncredited); Bob Godfrey
- Starring: Richard Briers; Harry Fowler; Angus Lennie; Barbara Moore; Peter Hawkins; Cyril Shaps
- Narrated by: Harry Fowler
- Edited by: Tony Fish, Peter Hearn
- Music by: Jonathan P. Hodge
- Production company: Grantstern Films
- Distributed by: British Lion Films
- Release date: 17 March 1975
- Running time: 28 minutes
- Country: United Kingdom
- Language: English

Great is a British 28-minute animated short film released in 1975, telling a humorous version of the life of Isambard Kingdom Brunel. It was directed by Bob Godfrey, produced by Grantstern Films and distributed by British Lion.

Great won the Academy Award for Best Animated Short Film at the 48th Academy Awards in March 1976, making it the first British animated film to do so. Great also won the BAFTA award for Best Animated Film the same year.

== Background ==
The film recounts the life and works of the 19th century British civil engineer and architect Isambard Kingdom Brunel in a way that is affectionate and often tongue-in-cheek. The narrator, voiced by Harry Fowler, explains the triumphs and setbacks of Brunel's career, comparing him to Archimedes, Isaac Newton and Albert Einstein. Richard Briers provides the voice of Brunel. There are numerous songs in the film, including "Get a big top hat if you want to get ahead".

== Production ==
Great is primarily an animated film, although it is mixed media, combining some live action sequences with the animation.

In an interview with The Guardian in April 2001, Bob Godfrey explained how the film came about:

I'd been reading a book about Brunel so I asked British Lion, who backed Kama Sutra [Rides Again], if I could have some money to make a half-hour cartoon about a Victorian engineer. Yes, they said, here's £20,000. They thought the sun shone out of my arse at the time. They'd have given me money to animate a toilet if I'd asked them.

== Availability ==
Great has not been released on home video formats such as VHS or DVD with the official website of The Bob Godfrey Collection stating that this was due to the film's copyright status.
