= Two Off the Cuff =

1968 British animated film by Bob Godfrey

- Directed by: Bob Godfrey
- Screenplay by: Stan Hayward
- Produced by: Bob Godfrey
- Cinematography: Bev Roberts; Ramon Modiano
- Edited by: Tony Fish; Peter Hearn
- Animation by: Bob Godfrey; Bill Sewell
- Production company: Bob Godfrey Films
- Release date: 1968
- Running time: 9 minutes
- Country: United Kingdom
- Language: English

Two Off the Cuff (also known as Happenings and Masks) is a 1968 British animated short film directed by Bob Godfrey and starring the voices of Ronnie Barker and Derek Guyler. It was written by Stan Hayward.

== Scenario ==
Two Off the Cuff comprises two separate short films: Masks and Happenings.

In Masks, a man named Harry describes how his laughing face is a facade. Underneath, he is miserable. He meets a girl who looks sad, and fantasises that she will understand him. They wed, but then he discovers that her face, too, is a mask, and that underneath she is happy.

In Happenings, a man has been standing for almost five hours, waiting for something to happen, and visualising interesting things happening to other people in other places. A second man appears, and calls the first man a fool for his fruitless waiting. To show the first man how stupid he looks, the second man takes his place, and is immediately struck by lightning.

== Cast ==
=== Masks ===
- Bob Godfrey as Harry (voice)

=== Happenings ===
- Ronnie Barker as first man (voice)
- Deryck Guyler as second man (voice)

== Reception ==
The Monthly Film Bulletin wrote: "As with most of Godfrey's recent work, the style is far removed from the inconsequential, Goonish antics of his earlier films. But though both cartoons make their points effectively enough, the combination of traditional British animation comedy (a dog piddling on the man in Happenings) and a mildly didactic tone doesn't really come off. And as so often, the ideas, both general and particular, are too obviously derivative of other cartoonists. The solitary man talking aloud is straight out of Feiffer, and one of the jokes in Happenings (divorce illustrated by a woman gobbling up a man) is borrowed from Yoji Kuri. Godfrey's style is much more disciplined than it used to be; it's a pity he can't find more original expression for it."

The British Film Institute wrote: "Long before Bob Godfrey and writer Stan Hayward collaborated on Henry’s Cat, this independent adult short twinned their special gifts. Bob draws and voices Masks, a story about finding marriage through melancholy with a kick in the tail. The second part Happenings features the distinctive vocal talents of Ronnie Barker and Deryck Guyler."

Chris Robinson wrote: "Two Off the Cuff is a drawn film with collage elements that explores individual unhappiness in an increasingly fractured society. The collage portions (not animated) appear in the somewhat dated and sexist fantasy segments of the clown protagonist (who eventually gets his comeuppance)."
