= Henry's Cat =

1983 British animated children's TV series

- DVD cover
- Genre: Comedy; Adventure
- Created by: Bob Godfrey; Stan Hayward
- Written by: Stan Hayward; Kevin Baldwin (series 5); Bob Godfrey (series 5); Mike Knowles (series 5)
- Directed by: Bob Godfrey
- Voices of: Bob Godfrey
- Narrated by: Bob Godfrey
- Theme music composer: Peter Shade; John Hyde; Rowland Lee; Jonathan Hodge
- Opening theme: "Henry's Cat Theme"
- Ending theme: "Henry's Cat Theme" (Instrumental)
- Composers: Peter Shade (series 1); John Hyde (series 2–3); Jonathan Hodge (series 4); Rowland Lee (series 5)
- Country of origin: United Kingdom
- No. of series: 5
- No. of episodes: 51

Production
- Executive producer: Bob Godfrey
- Producer: Bob Godfrey
- Editors: Derek Phillips (series 1); Sean Lenihan (series 2); John Daniels (series 3); Picture Head (series 4–5)
- Camera setup: Derek Phillips (series 1–3); Julian Holdaway (series 4); Heather Reader (series 4); Jeremy Moorshead (series 5)
- Running time: 4–5 minutes (series 1–2); 14–15 minutes (series 3–4); 12 minutes (series 5)
- Production company: Bob Godfrey Films Ltd.

Original release
- Network: BBC1
- Release: 12 September 1983 – 10 June 1993

Henry's Cat is a British animated children's television series, created by Bob Godfrey and Stan Hayward and directed by Godfrey, who was also the producer of Roobarb and Noah and Nelly in... SkylArk. The show stars a yellow cat, known only as Henry's Cat, and his many friends and enemies. In every episode, narration and character voices were provided by Bob Godfrey.

Henry's Cat was first screened by BBC Television in the United Kingdom on 12 September 1983, and originally aired until 8 December 1987 for its first four series. After a five-year hiatus, it returned for an additional fifth series, which aired from 24 December 1992 to 10 June 1993. A total of 51 episodes were produced across the five series. The show was re-dubbed for American audiences with the voice of Dom DeLuise.

== Characters ==
=== Main ===
- Henry's Cat – The main protagonist, a laid-back daydreamer with a great passion for eating and adventure.
- Chris Rabbit – Henry's Cat's best friend, an ever-enthusiastic, highly energetic blue rabbit.
- Mosey Mouse – The opposite of Chris Rabbit, Mosey is dour and realistic.
- Douglas Dog, Sammy Snail, Pansy Pig, Denise Duck, Ted Tortoise, Philippe Frog – miscellaneous friends of Henry's Cat. They all mean well, but often overestimate their own abilities in various ways.

=== Antagonists ===
- Farmer Giles – A crotchety human farmer with a West Country accent who is occasionally inconvenienced by Henry's Cat's antics. He only appears in the first season.
- Constable Bulldog – A stern but fair policeman (or police dog) who takes a very cynical view of the gang's well-meaning escapades, but is usually willing to negotiate.
- Rum Baa Baa – The main antagonist: a criminal mastermind sheep who is Henry's Cat's archenemy.

=== Henry ===
Henry himself never appeared on screen; the name is thought by some to be an allusion to an earlier one-off Hayward/Godfrey collaboration, Henry 9 'til 5, about a bowler-hatted commuter who escaped his boring everyday life by indulging in daydreams, mostly of a sexual nature. Henry's Cat shared the earlier character's tendency toward wild flights of fancy and laid-back approach to life. Henry's Cat creator Stan Hayward included the official explanation for the character's lack of a name on the official Henry's Cat Special Edition DVD in 2000: Henry (who never appeared in the series proper) was Henry's Cat's original owner, but one day, he moved away, and Henry's Cat had forgotten to go with him. The cat had a terrible memory, and eventually even forgot his own name, and so became known simply as "Henry's Cat".

== Series overview ==
Series	Episodes	Originally released	
Series	Episodes	First released	Last released
1	20	12 September 1983	24 December 1983
2	15	3 January 1984	28 December 1984
3	6	8 January 1986	12 February 1986
4	6	22 December 1986	8 December 1987
5	4	24 December 1992	10 June 1993

== Episode list ==
=== Series 1 (1983) ===
Each episode in this series is 4–5 minutes long.

No. overall	No. in series	Title	Original release date
1	1	"The Race"	12 September 1983
Henry's Cat holds a race with all his friends racing with their own talents.
2	2	"The Hypnotist"	13 September 1983
Henry's Cat is inspired by the TV to try out hypnotism to help his friends, but soon decides to undo his hypnosis.
3	3	"The Hobby"	14 September 1983
Henry's Cat is inspired to find a hobby of his own and watches his friends doing theirs.
4	4	"The Treasure"	15 September 1983
Henry's Cat and Chris Rabbit try to find treasure with a dividing stick.
5	5	"The Whale"	16 September 1983
Henry's Cat goes fishing for a whale to get something new to eat.
6	6	"The Diet"	19 September 1983
Henry's Cat takes the advice of a weighing machine to cut down on overeating and take exercise.
7	7	"The Invention"	20 September 1983
Henry's Cat is inspired to invent a machine and ends inventing something for Captain McGregor.
8	8	"The Circus"	21 September 1983
Henry's Cat sees a circus and sees this as an exciting opportunity.
9	9	"The Holiday"	22 September 1983
Henry's Cat goes on holiday on a sailing boat at sea.
10	10	"The Competition"	23 September 1983
Henry's Cat, Chris Rabbit and Mosey Mouse dress up as a one-man band for a competition.
11	11	"The Film"	26 September 1983
Henry's Cat gets an old film cine camera to make a film starring his friends.
12	12	"The Artist"	27 September 1983
Henry's Cat tries to learn about art and how artists see things differently.
13	13	"The Moon Trip"	28 September 1983
Henry's Cat and Chris Rabbit go in a balloon for a journey to the moon.
14	14	"The Fortune Teller"	29 September 1983
Henry's Cat goes to a fortune teller at a funfair with his future near at hand.
15	15	"The Disco Dance"	30 September 1983
Henry's Cat takes his friends to a disco dance competition. When that does not work out, they join a carnival.
16	16	"The Ill Wind"	13 September 1984
A sick Henry's Cat imagines himself dying and going to the afterlife.
17	17	"The Dream"	20 September 1984
Henry's Cat falls asleep after eating a lot, dreaming about vivid things.
18	18	"The Robbery"	27 September 1984
Henry's Cat becomes a detective, but runs into Mosey Mouse's uncle.
19	19	"The Explorer"	4 October 1984
Henry's Cat goes exploring to find the West Pole.
20	20	"The Christmas Dinner"	25 December 1983
Henry's Cat helps Chris Rabbit prepare a Christmas dinner, but they get themselves stuck.

=== Series 2 (1984) ===
Each episode in this series is 4–5 minutes long.

No. overall	No. in series	Title	Original release date
21	1	"The Secret Weapon"	11 October 1984
Henry's Cat dreams about himself and Chris Rabbit as scientists defending the Earth from little blue men.
22	2	"The Hot Day"	18 October 1984
On a hot day in France, Henry's Cat unknowingly finds himself joining the Foreign Legion in the hot desert.
23	3	"The Invitation"	25 October 1984
Henry's Cat is invited to dinner party with Lady Snotgrove, but he feels unprepared without proper table manners.
24	4	"The Magic Tummy Button"	1 November 1984
Henry's Cat and his friends search a museum for the lost temple of Aki-Kun-Bubu to find a magic tummy button.
25	5	"The Actor"	8 November 1984
Henry's Cat decides to become a famous actor and does in the theatre by accident.
26	6	"The Ventriloquist"	15 November 1984
Henry's Cat enters a contest as a ventriloquist with Chris Rabbit as his dummy, but it all goes wrong.
27	7	"The Hero"	22 November 1984
Henry's Cat imagines his Great Uncle Felix's adventure as a First World War ace fighter pilot against Baron Von Baa Baa in 1916.
28	8	"The Catseye Kid"	29 November 1984
Henry's Cat imagines himself as the cowboy Catseye who is out to stop the cattle rancher, Bandit Baa Baa.
29	9	"The Clever Trick"	6 December 1984
Henry's Cat learns a trick to bend objects, which eventually makes him famous around the world.
30	10	"The Abominable Snowman"	13 December 1984
Henry's Cat and Chris Rabbit go an expedition which winds them up in trouble.
31	11	"Caveman Cat"	20 December 1984
Henry's Cat daydreams about being a cave cat with his inventing neighbour Chris Rabbit.
32	12	"The New Year's Resolution"	28 December 1984
Henry's Cat is prompted to take exercise for New Year with a backwards running race with his friends.
33	13	"The Good News Day"	3 January 1985
On a day where nothing is happening, Henry's Cat dreams he is a heroic captain of a plane that cruises across the world.
34	14	"The Merry Men and Women"	10 January 1985
Henry's Cat dresses as Robin Hood and recruits his friends as his Merry Men and Women.
35	15	"The Weatherman"	4 December 1986
Henry's Cat becomes a weatherman to report good weather forecasts.

=== Series 3 (1986) ===
Each episode in this series is 14–15 minutes long.

No. overall	No. in series	Title	Original release date
36	1	"The Treasure Hunt"	8 January 1986
Henry's Cat dreams of being a member of his own crew at sea after reading about the 19th-century Treasure Island.
37	2	"The Day of Terrible Jokes"	15 January 1986
Henry's Cat, fascinated by medieval knights dreams that he is a bold knight winning a jousting tournament against Sir Loin of Lamb. After that, he is sent to capture a three-headed dragon.
38	3	"The Case of the Pilfered Pearls"	22 January 1986
Henry's Cat imagines himself as Sherlock Holmes on the trail of Rum Baa Baa (here operating under the name of Rumbini), who has been using his magic shows as a means to steal expensive jewellery from the rich.
39	4	"The Lost World"	29 January 1986
Henry's Cat, fascinated by a TV program based around Tarzan, dreams that he himself is a jungle man with a huge responsibility to take care of the Lost World. The next day, Henry's Cat must keep Rum Baa Baa from capturing the mighty King Kongo.
40	5	"The Computer"	5 February 1986
Henry's Cat goes to a computer exhibition. There, he rents a small robot he calls Pooter. He soon learns the hard way that trying to buy Pooter is hard, and keeping his house orderly is even harder.
41	6	"The Correspondence Course"	12 February 1986
After seeing a cartoon advertisement on TV, Henry's Cat decides to become an animator himself. Note: This episode features a character called Big Bob, who is a caricature of Bob Godfrey.

=== Series 4 (1986–87) ===
Each episode in this series is 14–15 minutes long.

No. overall	No. in series	Title	Original release date
42	1	"Once Upon a Time"	22 December 1986
Henry's Cat imagines himself meeting various fairy tale characters, including a wolf who wants to eat Little Red Riding Hood's Granny.
43	2	"The Birthday Caper"	13 February 1987
Fed up on his birthday, Henry's Cat decides to go to Hollywood and try becoming a famous film star there.
44	3	"The Funny Feeling"	20 February 1987
Mosey Mouse catches the Clownitis disease on Mid-Summer's Day. Henry's Cat rushes to the Moo-Moo Juice factory to stop Rum Baa Baa from producing it.
45	4	"Out for the Count"	22 September 1987
Henry's Cat and Chris Rabbit are in a blowing gum match, but get lost and enter the creepy castle of Count Rum Baa Baa. Together they thwart his experiments.
46	5	"The Jingle"	1 December 1987
Henry's Cat and Chris Rabbit go to Cyril Chipper to help in his advertising campaign becoming successful.
47	6	"The Great Adventure"	8 December 1987
Henry's Cat imagines he is Captain Good Cat, who has to stop Rum Baa Baa from stealing stars to advertise his canned food product.

=== Series 5 (1992–93) ===
Each episode in this series is 12 minutes long.

No. overall	No. in series	Title	Original release date
48	1	"The Mystery of the Missing Santa"	24 December 1992
Henry's Cat and Chris Rabbit, who are detectives, go on a caper to find the kidnapped Father Christmas. They both break in the chateau, rescue Father Christmas and get Count Rum Baa Baa arrested.
49	2	"When Time Went Wrong"	30 December 1992
After attempting to fix his cuckoo clock, Henry's Cat, along with Chris Rabbit, travels in time to prehistoric times. As they try to go back to the present, they travel from one Epoch to another.
50	3	"The New President"	29 April 1993
Henry's Cat applies to be the new president of the United States of America and have his portrait carved into Mount Rushmore. Chris Rabbit tells him about the history of America, featuring George Washington, Charlie Chaplin and the Seven Dwarfs.
51	4	"Valentine's Day"	10 June 1993
Henry's Cat sees Pansy Pig on TV, wearing a paper bag on her head, thinking she is ugly and nobody loves her. He pities her, so he and his pals put on a "blind dates" show for her. Note: This episode, along with "The New President", won a Cable Ace Award in 1994 for Best Children's TV Series.

== Notes ==
- All of the episodes from Series 1 are dated 1983 and from Series 2 to Series 5 are dated 1984 in the credits.
- Bob Godfrey Films' opening logo of this series was Henry's Cat meowing, in a direct parody of the MGM logo.
- The companies that released the videos were Guild Home Video, Castle Vision/Playbox Video, Children's Choice, and Screen Legends/Pickwick Video. Despite airing on Children's BBC, it was never licensed to home video by BBC Video. HBO Video and Family Home Entertainment also had released VHS tapes in the US in 1986 and 1989 respectively.
- In January 2008, a promotional DVD containing all Series 1 episodes was distributed by The Times newspaper.

== Credits ==
=== Series 1 ===
- Created by: Stan Hayward
- Script: Stan Hayward
- Animation: Bob Godfrey, Paul Stone, Kevin Baldwin
- Music & Sound: Peter Shade
- Narrated by: Bob Godfrey
- Camera & Editing: Derek Phillips
- Production: Mike Hayes
- Produced & Directed by: Bob Godfrey

(c) Stan Hayward Bob Godfrey Films Ltd. 1983

=== Series 2 ===
- Created by: Stan Hayward
- Script: Stan Hayward
- Animation: Kevin Baldwin, Bob Godfrey, Malcolm Hartley, Drew Mandigo, Paul Stone
- Assistant Animator: Malou Bonicos (one episode, series 2, The Hot Day )
- Music: John Hyde / de Wolfe Ltd.
- Dubbing: John Wood Studios
- Editing: Sean Lenihan
- Camera: Derek Phillips
- Production: Mike Hayes
- Produced, Directed and Narrated by: Bob Godfrey

(c) Stan Hayward Bob Godfrey Films Ltd. 1984 (From Series 2 to Series 5)

=== Series 3 ===
- Created by: Stan Hayward
- Script: Stan Hayward
- Animation: Kevin Baldwin, Bob Godfrey, Malcolm Hartley, Mark Oz, Paul Rosevear
- Music: John Hyde / de Wolfe Ltd
- Trace & Paint: Tancy Baran, Beryl Godfrey, Louise Unwin
- Camera: Derek Phillips
- Editing: John Daniels
- Production: Mike Hayes
- Produced, Directed and Narrated by: Bob Godfrey

=== Series 4 ===
- Created by: Stan Hayward
- Script: Stan Hayward
- Animation: Kevin Baldwin, Bob Godfrey, Neil Salmon
- Additional Animation: Steve Roberts
- Music: Jonathan Hodge
- Trace and Paint: Beryl Godfrey, Louise Unwin
- Camera: Julian Holdaway, Heather Reader
- Editing: Picture Head
- Production: Mike Hayes
- Narrated, Directed and Produced by: Bob Godfrey

=== Series 5 ===
- Created by: Stan Hayward
- Script: Stan Hayward, Mike Knowles, Kevin Baldwin, Bob Godfrey
- Storyboard, Layouts, Animation: Kevin Baldwin
- Additional Animation: Jeff Goldner, Neil Salmon, Bob Godfrey, Jody Gannon
- Trace and Paint: Denise Hambry, Lisa Smith, Jazvinda Phull, Beryl Godfrey, Ricky Arnold
- Music: Rowland Lee
- Title Music: Jonathan P. Hodge
- Camera: Jeremy Moorshead
- Backgrounds: Bob Godfrey
- Editing: Picturehead
- Production: Mike Hayes
- Narrated, Produced and Directed by: Bob Godfrey

== Home media ==
=== Australian VHS releases ===
- Roadshow Entertainment (2001)

VHS title	Release date	Episodes
Henry's Cat and Friends: The Hobby and Other Stories (102984)	14 March 2001	"The Hobby"; "The Race"; "The Circus"; "The Competition"; "The Moontrip"; "The Film"; "The Holiday"; "The Treasure"; "The Ill Wind"; "The Diet"; "The Fortune Teller"; and "The Explorer".
Henry's Cat and Friends: The Whale and Other Stories (102985)	13 June 2001	"The Whale"; "The Invention"; "The Dream"; "The Robbery"; "The Christmas Dinner"; "The Hypnotist"; "The Disco Dance"; "The Artist"; "The Magic Tummy Button"; "The Secret Weapon"; "The New Year's Resolution"; and "The Good News Day".
Henry's Cat and Friends: The Cat's Eye Kid and Other Stories (102986)	3 September 2001	"The Cat's Eye Kid"; "The Hot Day"; "The Merry Men and Women"; "The Actor"; "The Weatherman"; "The Invitation"; "The Ventriloquist"; "The Clever Trick"; "The Hero"; "Caveman Cat"; and "The Abominable Snowman".
