= Grange Calveley =

British writer (1943–2021)

- Born: 6 May 1943; Cheshire, England
- Died: 22 August 2021 (aged 78)
- Occupations: Scriptwriter, artist
- Website: http://www.grangecalveley.com

Grange Calveley (6 May 1943 – 22 August 2021) was a British artist and writer. He was best known as the creator of the BBC's animated television series Roobarb (1974) and Noah and Nelly in... SkylArk (1977).

Calveley also wrote and made character drawings for the 2005 revival series, Roobarb and Custard Too. The series was commissioned by UK's Channel FIVE and directed by Jason Tammemagi.

== Early life ==
Calveley was born on 6 May 1943 in Hale, Cheshire. His father was with the Scots Guards and was killed at Arezzo in 1944.

Grange attended Bradbury Central school on Queens Road, Hale. After leaving Bradbury at age 15 he joined Osborne Peacock, a Manchester advertising agency and later attended art college on day release.

After Art College, Calveley worked for a number of advertising agencies in London. It was while at Masius that he met his wife Hanny, a copywriter.

== Roobarb ==
The Roobarb cartoon character is loosely based on Calveley's own dog, a Welsh Border Collie. Custard was drawn after the huge cat who lived next door.

The Roobarb (1974) television series was commissioned by the BBC, who sold the series to more than 40 countries around the world. In his book, Roobarb: An Illuminated Biogwoofy, Calveley describes how the real dog would leap up into the fork of a tree and how the dog's antics became part of the cartoon's opening title. Roobarb was directed by Bob Godfrey, the series' music was by John Hawksworth and the stories were narrated by Richard Briers.

The characteristic bouncy wobbly style known as "boiling" was used as Calveley and the other animators did not have enough money to use traditional cel methods and used marker pens on paper instead.

== Other works ==
Roobarb was followed in 1977 by Noah and Nelly in... SkylArk. In the late 70s Calveley and his family moved to Australia where he produced further TV series, Captain Cookaburra's AustraliHa (1983), Captain Cookaburra's Road to Discovery (1985) and in 2005 a sequel to Roobarb called Roobarb and Custard Too.

Away from television, Calveley was the author of the series of children's books One to Five.

Calveley died on 22 August 2021 after suffering a stroke 12 days previously.
