= Old Harry's Game =

UK radio comedy, 1995 to 2012

- Series logo
- Genre: Sitcom
- Running time: 29 minutes
- Country of origin: United Kingdom
- Language: English
- Home station: BBC Radio 4
- Starring: Andy Hamilton; James Grout (Series 1-Christmas Special 2002); Jimmy Mulville; Steve O'Donnell (Series 1); Robert Duncan (Series 2 onwards); David Swift (Guest appearances); Annette Crosbie (Series 6 onwards); Philip Pope (Regular guest appearances); Felicity Montagu (Regular guest appearances); Michael Fenton Stevens (Regular guest appearances); Nick Revell (Regular guest appearances); Claire Skinner (Christmas Special 2002); Geoffrey Whitehead (Series 5); Timothy West (Series 7)
- Created by: Andy Hamilton
- Written by: Andy Hamilton
- Produced by: Paul Mayhew-Archer
- Original release: 27 November 1995 – 2012
- No. of series: 7 (as of 2010)
- No. of episodes: 46 (as of July 2012)
- Opening theme: Musical motif from Christopher Young's score for Hellraiser (1987) ('Resurrection'/ Main Theme)
- Website: At BBC Radio 4

Old Harry's Game is a British radio comedy written and directed by Andy Hamilton, who stars as the cynical, world-weary Satan. "Old Harry" is one of many names for the Devil. The show's title is a play on that of the 1982 television series Harry's Game.

Beginning in 1995, four series, of six half-hour episodes each, were aired by 2001, and a two-part Christmas special followed in 2002. A fifth full series was frequently delayed because of a cast member's illness, but recording of the four episodes of series five took place in April 2005 (postponed from January). The first episode of that series was broadcast on 20 September 2005 on BBC Radio 4. James Grout (who played the Professor during the first four series) did not take part. Series 6 began on 27 September 2007, and Series 7 aired in 2009. Christmas and New Year specials were broadcast on 23 and 30 December 2010 respectively, and a two-part Olympics special on 12 and 19 July 2012.

Apart from series 3 and 4, the episodes were not given official titles.

Andy Hamilton (Satan), James Grout (the Professor), Robert Duncan (Scumspawn), David Swift (God) and Michael Fenton Stevens had all worked together previously, in the UK television comedy series Drop the Dead Donkey between 1990 and 1998, which Hamilton co-wrote. Swift and Stevens were written into the 1998 series by Hamilton when the run of Donkey ended that year. The majority of the guest and recurring actors also had roles in Drop the Dead Donkey, including Jasper Jacob (series one), Philip Pope (recurring), Nick Revell (recurring), Nigel Pegram, Penelope Nice (Deborah Whittingham, before being replaced by Felicity Montagu) and Geoffrey Whitehead (Roland).

A 30-minute animated version was created in 2012, as the pilot for a possible television series, by the UK animation house Flickerpix, but in the event a series was not commissioned.

== Plot ==
The series is set mainly in Hell, and the plot usually centres on the relationships and conflicts between Satan, his various minions, and the damned with (occasionally) interventions by God and other denizens of Heaven. Satan himself is identified with the fallen angel in Christianity and portrayed as jaded from millennia in charge of Hell and the expectation that he will continue to be so for eternity. Although he enjoys some aspects of the job, such as the opportunity to play pranks in the world of the living, and devising ironic torments for those damned souls whom he believes deserve it, his greatest wish is to someday be accepted back into Heaven, and he often wistfully recalls his past as an archangel.

The series regularly features famous historical figures and celebrities, most of whom are portrayed as being less likeable than (or at least different from) the version recorded by history. This includes a foul-mouthed and extremely violent Jane Austen, a sexually predatory Florence Nightingale, a less-than-heroic Samson, and a vacuous Helen of Troy (accompanied by her plain-looking friend, Daphne).

This subversive approach was also applied to God (first name Nigel), who makes the occasional appearance, originally played by David Swift, then in series 7 by Timothy West. God is usually portrayed as being quick-tempered and vengeful; in the series he says he created the universe accidentally, when he was messing about with some matter and energy. He put it down to have a sip of his drink and then, kaboom! he had a universe on his hands. Life on Earth was created for a bet, as Earth was dull viewing; God, for a bit of fun, sprinkled some mutating bacteria into the oceans and ran a book with the other Angels to see which one would evolve into a creature that would develop a language first; the Angel Gabriel's bacteria were doing very well until they randomly mutated into carrots, and it was one of the Seraphim whose bacteria eventually became Homo sapiens. God seems rather annoyed that things 'got out of hand'.

The Angels are also portrayed somewhat differently. The Angel who delivered the news that Mary was to give birth to the Messiah was in fact named Graham, while Gabriel is a separate entity who was credited with doing so due to a transcription error early in the making of the Bible. They are also presented as rather arrogant when dealing with Satan, but at the same time behaving as suck-ups around God. They are forbidden to indulge in physical pleasures, but are still tempted by them (which has been used against them).

=== Series 1 to 4 ===
The first four series centred on the philosophical arguments between Satan and the somewhat idealistic main human character known as "The Professor" (played by James Grout). The Professor represents the undeserving damned, being a man of high moral virtue and having been consigned to Hell only on the technicality that he did not believe in God. The character was originally called Professor Richard Whittingham, although in series 2 he is referred to as Professor Richard Hope, when in episodes 5 & 6 Satan gets his book The Theory of Everything published. Generally, Satan seeks to prove to the Professor that mankind is inherently base or flawed, with the Professor taking the opposing position. Usually Satan travels to the living world to display the more contemptible sides of human nature, such as snipers shooting old ladies in Bosnia or prostitution in Thailand, to a generally horrified Professor. At other times he introduces the Professor to historical personages the Professor holds in high esteem but who are now languishing in Hell, such as Leonardo da Vinci, William Shakespeare and Jane Austen, showing him how petty and mendacious they really are. However, the Professor's idealism is usually shown to have some validity as well, and more often than not he wins the argument although Satan always insists he hasn't.

The other main human character is Thomas Quentin Crimp (Jimmy Mulville), an execrable type with no morals, held out by Satan as an example of all that is detestable about humanity and often described (especially by God himself) as the most venal and corrupt human being who ever lived. In the first episode, it transpires that Thomas caused the car crash which landed him and the Professor in Hell. The latter, despite his moral idealism, is consigned to Hell because of his atheism (since, as Satan remarks caustically, God does not have a sense of humour). The fact of the afterlife — which the Professor originally optimistically views as a hallucination - does not change his views. Despite (or perhaps because of) their conflicting attitudes, the Professor and Thomas are billeted together by Satan.

Regular plot elements involve the Professor visiting, or being shown, his beloved wife Deborah as she gets on with her life following his death. His widow's eventual marriage to a corrupt Irish jockey and her near-fatal coma were important plot strands in series 3 and 4. Throughout the first four series, the Professor also has an ongoing bet with Satan that he can demonstrate that even Thomas has some decency within him; if he can do so, then Satan will allow Deborah and the Professor to be billeted together should Deborah be sent to Hell when she dies. These plot strands ended when Satan finally arranged for the Professor to be accepted into Heaven a short time after the events of the 2002 Christmas special (an incident not covered in the series).

Other characters featured are Satan's minions. Satan's personal assistant and most venomous demon, Gary (Steve O'Donnell), was featured in the first series because Thomas was on his list of tormentees. Thomas later manipulates Gary and convinces him to rebel against Satan, with a distinct lack of success. Gary is mentioned only once in later series and his absence is never explained (although the implication is that he fell from favour due to his rebellion). Scumspawn (Robert Duncan), featured from the second series onwards, takes Gary's place, having applied (repeatedly) to become Satan's new personal assistant. Although Satan initially refuses, he later relents, and Scumspawn proves a surprisingly effective assistant. His subplots usually involve attempts to become a better demon (with help from Thomas). Much of the humour surrounding Scumspawn derives from his sensitive, caring and highly artistic personality, which is a constant irritant to Satan, who often complains that Scumspawn does not act very much like a demon.

According to Andy Hamilton in an interview broadcast on 5 April 2008, on BBC Radio 7's "I Did It My Way", one episode in series 3 was partially re-recorded due to a tragic confluence of events. In the episode, Satan disrupts Deborah's wedding to Irish jockey Rory O'Donnell by taking the form of BBC reporter Jill Dando and accusing the presiding vicar of being a Satan worshipper (which he actually is). Later in the episode, Satan reveals that Jill Dando never existed at all and was just a disguise that he used to stir up unrest in the realm of the living. After the episode was originally broadcast, the 37-year-old reporter was murdered outside her home, and the episode was partially re-recorded for repeats with Satan manifesting himself instead as a different BBC reporter, Gaby Roslin. (The re-recorded lines are fairly obvious, as they were not performed in front of an audience.) A later episode in the third series referenced Satan's "Jill Dando" alter ego, and also had to have some lines re-recorded.

=== Christmas Special 2002 ===
In a double-bill Special, broadcast on New Year's Eve 2002 (The Roll of the Dice) and New Year's Day 2003 (Knocking on Heaven's Door), Hope (Claire Skinner), an extraordinarily beautiful Salvation Army worker and tambourine player, is killed by accident years too early and sent to Hell by mistake. This results in Satan trying to have her brought back to life by taking her to Death. But he only gets as far as meeting the Welsh Death (Dai-the-Death), and contacting the Head Death on his mobile. After Death refuses to bring her back to life (for fear of legal recriminations), as a last resort Satan travels to Heaven (now protected with barbed wire, CCTV and Rottweilers). After talking to Saint Peter (who Satan implies had sex with call girls in Rome as well as stealing the other 100 pieces of silver which had been contracted by Judas Iscariot but went missing), Satan blackmails St Peter into letting Hope into Heaven.

While all this is going on, the Professor has been changed into a buzzing bluebottle and Thomas has been painted like a zebra and is awaiting the "attentions" of some special crocodiles (they have a sense of humour).

=== Series 5 ===
Series Five retains some of the themes from earlier series, but most of the action does not revolve around Satan's relationships with his minions and the damned. Instead, the episodes focus on Satan's efforts to reduce overcrowding in Hell.

After an unsuccessful appeal to God in Episode One for planning permission to enlarge Hell, expanding Hell's demonic workforce or adjusting the entrance requirements, the action divides between Hell and various locations on Earth. The basic plot of the subsequent episodes involves Satan taking on the guise of a leading world figure in order to meet influential people, such as Queen Elizabeth II, whom he tries to convince to lead more of mankind to Heaven by encouraging them to change their ways. However, these efforts are largely unsuccessful, and finally abandoned after Satan successfully takes control of the world's media to promote messages of peace, co-operation and so on, only to find that this has no effect and humanity just carries on committing mortal sins regardless.

The subplot of each episode focuses on Scumspawn's ineffective attempts to run Hell in Satan's absence. This normally involves trying to cope with a strange new arrival in Hell, unionised demons, or overcrowding. He generally enlists Thomas's help (as well as that of Vlad the Impaler in one episode, though he has no lines) in trying to find a solution, which usually fails. At the end of the episode, Satan returns and sorts out whatever new problem Scumspawn has managed to create.

The final two episodes of the series feature a new arrival, Roland (Geoffrey Whitehead), a damned soul even more venal and corrupt than Thomas who tries to organise a rebellion of the demons in Hell with Thomas's help, with exactly the same degree of success that Gary and Thomas had in Series 1. In the end, after easily dealing with the insurrection, Satan decides he need not worry, as humans will soon be extinct anyway. In order to hasten mankind's demise, he turns himself into Jeb Bush and plots to convince Jeb's brother George Bush to launch a nuclear strike on the polar icecaps.

=== Series 6 ===
For Series Six, Andy Hamilton returned to the style of the original series, with most of the action taking place in Hell. He introduces a new member of the damned: Edith Cordelia Barrington (Annette Crosbie), an academic and historian who has recently arrived in Hell after having apparently died by suicide due to an apparent overdose of barbiturates while watching Midsomer Murders. She is also Thomas's former mother-in-law, and as Edith and Thomas have a mutual hatred of each other, Satan decides they would be perfect dungeon-mates (the series temporarily ignoring the overcrowding issue).

Edith is not pleased with the situation, as Thomas had subjected her daughter to emotional abuse, to divorce, and had tried to obtain custody of her breast implants (on the grounds that he paid for them). She also insists that she did not take her own life, and Satan makes a deal with her: he grudgingly agrees to find out how she really died if she will write a definitive biography of Satan in return for new accommodation.

The basic plot of an episode generally involved Satan trying to find out more about Edith's death, while Edith interviewed members of the damned about Satan's past. These interviews closely followed the pattern of series 4, in which the Professor had interviewed famous historical personalities in attempting to win a bet with Satan (by showing that mankind was capable of redemption). There were also various sub-plots, including Scumspawn's attempts to uncover a "decent" side to Thomas's personality, in much the same way as the Professor had tried to in earlier series. Thus were the various aspects of the Professor's character re-distributed between Edith and Scumspawn.

Eventually, Satan does discover that Edith had been murdered by her best friend and colleague out of jealousy over Edith's more successful career. Although Satan manages to extract a confession on live television, Edith is still not happy. In the final episode, Thomas discovers that he is descended from corrupt angels, as indicated by his 'strawberry blonde' hair.

Following the initial broadcast of Series 6, selected episodes from the first six series were repeated on BBC Radio 7 on 5 April 2008, together with an interview with the show's writer and star, Andy Hamilton, in which he discusses the series up to that point, in an edition of Radio 7's occasional feature entitled "I Did It My Way".

=== Series 7 ===
A seventh series aired from 19 February 2009, with recordings taking place at the BBC Radio Theatre in London. The cast was the same as in Series Six.

In the first episode, a dog named Scamp arrives unexpectedly in Hell. Satan attempts to talk to God about both the new arrival and a possible plan to ease the general overcrowding in Hell (involving destroying 75% of the damned), but he can't, because God is bored with Satan and indeed with his whole Creation, and has left two rather insufferable angels in charge as "site managers" (who are more interested in admiring their laminated "site manager" badges than in doing anything).

In the second episode, God goes away for some "me time", leaving the Archangel Gabriel in charge. Unfortunately, Heaven's new computer system is having software problems, causing a further unexpected arrival in Hell — a baby — and Satan's renewed attempts to get help from God bring him face to face with Gabriel. Meanwhile, Scumspawn decides the baby needs a name and dubs it "Satan Junior". Taking care of the dog Scamp begins to bring out the best in Thomas, while Satan's meeting with Gabriel about the baby brings some slight results.

In the fourth episode Timothy West guest-stars as God (previously played by David Swift), and after being apprised of the situation orders Satan to arrange with Gabriel for both the dog and the baby's immediate transfer to Heaven. Since people in both Heaven and Hell remain forever the same age as they were when they died, this would mean the baby would remain a baby and never have a chance to live a full life, a fact that distresses Scumspawn and Edith so much that they convince Satan to disobey God's orders and try to return the baby to the world of the living (albeit as providing an exciting conclusion to Edith's biography of Satan).

The fifth episode sees Satan trying to find adoptive parents for the baby (now called "Patrick"), while Edith has a major crisis of confidence concerning her completed biography of Satan, and the dog Scamp is successfully transferred to Heaven (with one or two minor incidents thanks to Thomas teaching him some unusual tricks). With the aid of some photoshopped pictures, Satan blackmails Gabriel into helping him about baby Patrick.

In the final episode, a very angry God returns to put Satan and Gabriel on trial for not obeying His instructions about what should be done with the baby, but the trial quickly degenerates into chaos (God remarks at one point, "This place is a madhouse!"). Events ultimately resolve into a relatively happy conclusion (that is, for everyone except Thomas and Gabriel).

=== Christmas and New Year Specials 2010 ===
In Christmas Spirit, broadcast on 23 December 2010, Satan decides to ban Christmas. During a visitation to the world of Men he disguises himself as various religious figures, including the Pope, in order to more effectively denounce Christmas and then impersonates the new Editor of the Daily Mail newspaper (the previous Editor somehow got knocked down by a charging five-ton rhino while cycling around Hyde Park Corner) so as to publish made-up headlines undermining Christmas, such as "Mince Pies Cause Cancer" and "Taliban Targets Panto". However, in Hell the Spirit of Christmas is alive and well thanks to Scumspawn's efforts to cheer up Edith, although these only serve to depress her.

In Ring in the New, broadcast on 30 December 2010, Satan decides he needs a holiday. On Edith's advice he heads off to the English Lake District for some New Year solitude, leaving Scumspawn in charge of Hell. But Scumspawn isn't sure his leadership skills are up to the task, and a management seminar with Genghis Khan, Winston Churchill, Gandhi, Queen Elizabeth I and football manager Brian Clough proves no help. This is the only episode that ends relatively happily for Thomas.

=== Olympics Special 2012 ===
In mid-2012 the BBC announced a two-part special with an Olympic theme, both parts of which were recorded on 8 July 2012: with Andy Hamilton, Annette Crosbie, Robert Duncan and Jimmy Mulville all returning in their established roles.

The first part was broadcast on 12 July 2012, in which Satan attempts to show Edith that the ancient Greeks and the original Games were not as altruistic as she originally thought, while Thomas's participation in the Infernal Games ends up a crushing and painful disaster (thanks to an incident involving a hippo and later a rhinoceros).

The second part was broadcast on 19 July 2012, in which Satan is blackmailed by Edith into taking her to the 2012 London Olympics to see her grand-niece competing, but Satan discovers that the grand-niece isn't quite as Edith remembers her. Meanwhile, Thomas tries to get himself certified insane in order to escape from continued punishment and instead be eternally consigned to Hell's TV Lounge.

=== Television Pilot 2012 ===
Also in 2012, Andy Hamilton proposed a transfer of the show to television. A pilot episode was made for Sky TV (not for the BBC) by UK animation house Flickerpix, using stop motion animation. Based on scenes from some of the early radio episodes, it featured the voices of the radio cast (with James Grout's part recast following his death). The proposed series was not commissioned.

== Cast ==
Performer	Role	Series									
Performer	Role	1	2	3	4	2002 Special	5	6	7	2010 Specials	2012 Specials
Andy Hamilton	Satan	Main	Main	Main	Main	Main	Main	Main	Main	Main	Main
James Grout	Professor Richard Whittingham	Main	Main	Main	Main	Main	Guest				
Jimmy Mulville	Thomas Quentin Crimp	Main	Main	Main	Main	Main	Main	Main	Main	Main	Main
Robert Duncan	Scumspawn		Main	Main	Main	Main	Main	Main	Main	Main	Main
Annette Crosbie	Edith Cordelia Barrington							Main	Main	Main	Main
Steve O'Donnell	Gary	Main									
David Swift	God	Guest			Guest		Guest				
Timothy West	God								Guest		
Claire Skinner	Hope					Guest					
Geoffrey Whitehead	Roland						Guest				

== Episodes ==
=== Music ===
The opening and closing themes for each episode are taken from Christopher Young's soundtrack for the 1987 horror film Hellraiser ("Resurrection"). There are also uses of the cues "Reunion" and "The Lament Configuration" from the same score. The episodes also make use of "Ave Satani" from Jerry Goldsmith's 1976 soundtrack to The Omen.

== Audiobooks ==
Originally, two volumes of CDs, "Volume One" and "Volume Two" were released in 1999 and 2003, collecting selected episodes from series 1–4. From the 2002 Christmas Special onwards, the series were released on CD shortly after the broadcasts. In 2008 and 2009, the BBC finally went back and released series 1–4 in their entirety. The 2012 Olympics specials have been released via download on AudioGO but remain unreleased on CD.

- Volume One - Series 1: Episodes 1, 5 and 6. Series 2: Episodes 1, 2 and 4.
- Volume Two - Series 3: Episodes 1, 2 and 3. Series 4: Episodes 2, 3 and 4.
- Christmas Special - Both 2002 Christmas Special Episodes, released August 2003.
- Radio Series Five - The Complete Fifth Series, released November 2005.
- Radio Series Six - The Complete Sixth Series, released November 2007.
- Radio Series One And Two - The Complete First And Second Series (two separate box sets, but released together as a single entity), released in September 2008.
- Radio Series Seven - The Complete Seventh Series, released March 2009.
- Radio Series Three And Four - The Complete Third And Fourth Series (two separate box sets, but released together as a single entity), released in September 2009.
- The Complete Series 1-7 - The complete series 1–7 in one box set, including the 2002 Christmas specials, released October 2010
- Christmas Special - Both 2010 Christmas Special Episodes, released in October 2011.
