= Calveley (surname) =

Calveley is a surname. Notable people with the surname include:

- Grange Calveley (1943–2021), British writer and artist
- Hugh Calveley (died 1394), English knight and commander
- John Calveley, MP for Rutland
- Mike Calveley (born 1999), English footballer
