= Captain Cookaburra's AustraliHa =

Australian children's television program

- Created by: Grange Calveley
- Country of origin: Australia
- Original language: English
- No. of series: 1
- No. of episodes: 20

Production
- Running time: 5 mins

Original release
- Network: ABC
- Release: 24 October 1983

Captain Cookaburra's AustraliHa is an Australian children's animated television program that originally aired on ABC in 1983. Created by Grange Calveley it was an animated series, with very simple animation style described as "if a picture book were leafed through by invisible hands". The two main characters were Captain Cookaburra, a red or pink bird with prominent teeth, and his friend Boomerfang, a green snake. Both Captain Cookaburra and Boomerfang later featured on Captain Cookaburra's Road to Discovery.
