= Captain Cookaburra's Road to Discovery =

Australian children's television program

- Written by: Grange Calveley; Hanny Calveley
- Directed by: Grange Calveley
- Country of origin: Australia
- Original language: English

Production
- Producer: Louise Meek
- Running time: 30 mins

Original release
- Network: ABC
- Release: 12 August 1985

Captain Cookaburra's Road to Discovery is an Australian children's television program that originally aired on ABC from 12 August 1985. It was a magazine style program featuring puppets. The two main characters were Captain Cookaburra, a large pink bird with bulging eyes and lots of teeth, and Boomerfang, a green snake who swallowed a boomerang. Other characters include Dishy Doreen, Spotty Ron, Mind Boggler, Million-Year-Old Fred, Syd Courier, Nosey Rosey and Twenny and Weeny. It features short stories, jokes, quizzes and documentary sections. Both Captain Cookaburra and Boomerfang had previously featured on Captain Cookaburra's AustraliHa.
