= Zig and Zag (TV series) =

British-Irish children's animated sitcom

- Genre: Comedy; Animated sitcom
- Created by: Ciaran Morrison; Mick O'Hara
- Developed by: Max Lopez; Radzi Dussad
- Written by: Ciaran Morrison; Mick O'Hara
- Directed by: Niall Mooney
- Creative director: Chris O’Reily
- Voices of: Ciaran Morrison; Mick O'Hara; Debra Stephenson; Paul Tylak; Tara Flynn; Allen Doyle; Lisa Garvey; Inel Tomlinson
- Theme music composer: Ricky Wilson; Simon Rix
- Opening theme: "Zig and Zag", performed by Ricky Wilson and Simon Rix
- Ending theme: 5–4–3–2–1 Time for Zig and Zag (Ending Version)
- Composer: Jonathan Casey
- Countries of origin: United Kingdom; Ireland
- No. of seasons: 1
- No. of episodes: 26 + 22 shorts

Production
- Executive producers: Lucy Pryke (CBBC); John Rice; Joel Simon; David Cumming; Mick O'Hara; Ciaran Morrison; Janine Waddell; Iain Skala
- Producers: David Cumming; Ceallach Waxler
- Editor: Shannon Ryan
- Running time: 11 minutes
- Production companies: Double Z Enterprises; Flickerpix; JAM Media

Original release
- Network: CBBC; RTÉjr
- Release: March 1 – March 30, 2016

Zig and Zag is an animated sitcom, commissioned by CBBC and RTÉ and featuring the extraterrestrial puppets Zig and Zag from the planet Zog. It aired on CBBC and RTÉjr. Both Zig and Zag are voiced by the characters' original voice actors, creators and writers, Ciaran Morrison and Mick O'Hara.

== Plot ==
Alien brothers Zig and Zag crash land in humdrum suburbia and set up home. On their fun-filled adventures, they "make the most" of what Planet Earth has to offer.

== Cast ==
- Ciaran Morrison as Zig
- Mick O'Hara as Zag
- Debra Stephenson as Nellie
- Tara Flynn as Abs
- Paul Tylak as Pek
- Inel Tomlinson as Agent A. Gent
- Allen Doyle as Mrs. Eyebrows
- Sam McGovern as Agent Honey
- Lisa Garvey as Mrs. Jones

The above actors also act as an ensemble cast, providing all additional voices for recurring or one-off characters featured in each episode.

== Characters ==
=== Main ===
- Zigmund Ambrose Zogly: A carefree purple extraterrestrial with a heart of gold and a brain with the shape and processing power of a banana. He's not the brightest spark in the Solar System, but is endlessly enthusiastic, curious and ready for whatever adventures come his way. He is the brother of Zag.
- Zagnatius Hillary Zogly: A classic older brother type; overconfident, thinks he smarter than he really is and acts older than his age. Zag is always immaculately groomed with purple fur with green spots and in terms of fashion is always "on trend". He also processes "super" manners, employed when getting around influential adults or stubborn neighbours. He is the brother of Zig.
- Nellie: A fun pre-teen who helps her Dad out in the local mini-mart. Nellie is opinionated and quick to pick apart Zig and Zag's Semi-thought-out plans, she usually redirects them on to the right path, even if unintentionally. She thinks Zig is cute and loves to play up to him with faux flirting to get a reaction but it always goes completely over his own head. She is an offhand with Zag as she doesn't like his affectations. More often than not Nellie becomes a valuable ally when things get really out of hand for Zig and Zag! She's probably the Z brothers' best friend on Earth.

=== Recurring ===
- Mrs. Eyebrows: Zig and Zag's enigmatic next door neighbour, an elderly woman who has an imaginary cat called Mr. President.
- Mr. Jones: Mr. Jones is a nervous, always running late type. His favourite thing of all is his ‘quiet time’, but that is more often than not ruined as Zig and Zag always run to him for any and every bit of ‘how things work on Earth’ advice. And despite his protestations, Mr. Jones has become their unwitting mentor.
- Mrs. Jones: Mrs. Jones is the opposite of her husband; larger than life, enthusiastic and is always striving to be the perfect neighbour! She often lands on Zig and Zag's doorstep with some freshly baked beetroot macaroons, so they ain’t complaining!
- Brie and Stilton: are the Jones’ strange staring children. They never utter a word, all you ever hear them doing is breathing loudly through their noses.
- Nellie's Dad: We never see Nellie's Dad's face. He is always stacking shelves up a ladder. He is always sent tumbling when Zig takes an item from the bottom of a recently stacked pile of goods, this is followed by Zag announcing over the shop's Tannoy ‘Clean up on aisle three!’!
- The Secret Agents: The two Agents work for P.A.N.T.S (Prevention of Alien Network Takeover Squad) Agent A. Gent is an old school Man-in-Black, he has spent his whole career convinced that Earth is going to be invaded by aliens, but it never happened! He was just about to retire when Zig and Zag crash-landed in his neighbourhood. At last, the alien invasion he predicted is imminent! To get him out of the office and out of his hair his boss tasks Agent A. Gent and a level headed young operative Agent Honey to keep an eye on Zig and Zag... just in case.
- Abs & Pek Von Pumpiniron: The Von Pumpiniron's are an ex-tumbling act who now run the local Megagym. They live next door to Zig and Zag, are super-sporty and highly competitive. It's a mystery to Zig and Zag whether Abs is male or female. Pek doesn't speak any English, however Zig somehow understands his every word.
- The Marshmallow of Destiny: Zig has a marshmallow that he keeps in his anorak pocket. He only seeks the mallow's advice in times of extreme crisis. Zig is the only one who hears or sees the MOD imparting his wise advice.

== Production ==
On 15 April 2015, it was announced that a new animated Zig and Zag series was in production for CBBC and RTÉ. On 16 August 2015, the theme tune was composed and recorded by Ricky Wilson and Simon Rix from the band Kaiser Chiefs. It was also announced that it would start in early 2016.

== Episodes ==
=== Series 1 (2016) ===
The first series of twenty six episodes began broadcasting on RTÉjr on 1 March 2016 and CBBC on 25 April 2016.

#	Title	Date of Release on RTÉjr	Date of Release on CBBC	Summary
1	Ice Cream Clone	1 March 2016	25 April 2016	Zig and Zag's attempts to clone an ice cream in order to cool themselves down have a chilling effect on the whole of Burb Street.
2	DI Why?	1 March 2016	26 April 2016	Zig and Zag become DIY experts and set about fixing everything in Burb Street – whether it needs fixing or not!
3	Jobsworth	2 March 2016	27 April 2016	Zig and Zag discover the joys of ‘buying stuff’, but to buy stuff you need money, to get money you need a job!
4	Zollercoaster	2 March 2016	28 April 2016	Zig and Zag accidentally create the world's scariest roller coaster all because they want one of those cool ‘high speed upside down’ photo's!
5	School Rules	3 March 2016	29 April 2016	Zig and Zag go to school just to solve a crossword clue causing classroom chaos all the way to the bell!
6	Meet the Robo Parents	3 March 2016	2 May 2016	Zig and Zag create Robo-parents simply to use them to get the family deal at the Pizzeria, however the robots ‘parental programme’ gets out of control!
7	Fanzillas	4 March 2016	3 May 2016	Zig and Zag become football Superfans but learn that it is all about the winning, not just the taking part as they cost Burbia United the Cup!
8	It Came From Zog	4 March 2016	4 May 2016	Zig and Zag become filmmakers – but they're only in it for the free popcorn!
9	Strictly Zig and Zag	7 March 2016	5 May 2016	There's a hole in Zig and Zag's wall and the trophy awarded to the winners of Burbia's Dance Marathon would fill it perfectly!
10	Toddler Trouble	8 March 2016	6 May 2016	Zig and Zag become parents, well, to a talking doll in a bid to gain access to a toddlers playground and the enticing Clown on a Spring ride!
11	Happy Campers	9 March 2016	9 May 2016	It's dib, dib, don't as Zig and Zag join the Junior Woodpeckers scout troop simply to get ‘badges’ and end up causing havoc on their maiden camping trip.
12	All Washed Up	10 March 2016	10 May 2016	Mayhem ensues when Zig and Zag's washing machine breaks down. What to do? Take it to the hospital for an emergency operation of course!
13	Bitter Than You	11 March 2016	11 May 2016	Zig and Zag demonstrate how breaking a world record can be a bitter sweet experience.
14	It's Sherlucky Day	14 March 2016	12 May 2016	Zig and Zag become detectives to solve the case of The Missing Invisible Cat of Burb Street.
15	Staycation	15 March 2016	13 May 2016	Zig and Zag decide on their holiday destination; It's their favourite neighbours' The Jones' house! Aloha!
16	Billy Goats Grief	16 March 2016	6 June 2016	There's a Neat Neighbourhood Inspection so Zig and Zag employ a herd of goats to eat their untidy garden neat.
17	Zogly On Sea	17 March 2016	7 June 2016	Surf's up as the Z Brothers head to the sea side to catch some waves!
18	Zagracadabra	18 March 2016	8 June 2016	Zig and Zag become magicians to become famous just like their 'street magic' idol Backflow.
19	Let It Grow	21 March 2016	9 June 2016	Zig and Zag discover the joys of growing your own vegetable, but at the Farmers Market they discover that bigger doesn't always mean better!
20	Zog's Got Talent	22 March 2016	10 June 2016	When the Big TV Talent Show comes to town, Zig & Zag are keen to get involved, but what is that talent?
21	Best Behaviour	23 March 2016	13 June 2016	Zig and Zag think they need to learn some manners however they accidentally enroll themselves on an obedience class for dogs! Woof!
22	A Novel Idea	24 March 2016	14 June 2016	Zag decides to write the world's greatest novel just so he can sit on the best chair in the shopping centre.
23	Eau De Alien	25 March 2016	15 June 2016	Zig and Zag attempt to create their own 'celebrity scent' like their pop star idol Jonjo.
24	You Want Frights with That?	28 March 2016	16 June 2016	Zig and Zag stage their own haunting in a bid to get their video onto their favourite TV show ‘Ghost Hunters Live, if they weren’t Dead 5!
25	Chez Zog	29 March 2016	17 June 2016	In an attempt to raise enough cash to eat at the fanciest restaurant in Burbia, Zig & Zag set up their own fancy restaurant. That makes sense, right?
26	Superzag & Wonderzig	30 March 2016	20 June 2016	After watching a superhero movie, Zig and Zag find their calling! They will become superheroes themselves! It's Blam! Pow! Kapow! all over Burbia.

=== Shorts (2016–17) ===
A series of shorts, known as Zogcasts air on CBBC.

#	Title	Date of Release	Summary
1	Music	1 June 2016(online); 2 June 2016 (CBBC)	It's BBC Music Day and Zig and Zag try to come up with a coo-el, music-ey music way of celebrating it.
2	Football	10 June 2016 (online); 11 June 2016 (CBBC)	Zig and Zag inform the zoglings about the most beautiful game on earth – football. They ask and answer the all-important football-related questions including why footballers hide under their jerseys when they score a goal and should it be called 'feetball'?
3	Tennis	27 June 2016 (online)	Wimbledon is here so Zig and Zag help to explain all things tennis related in their funny Zogcast!
4	Books	30 June 2016(online); 12 July 2016 (CBBC)	Zig and Zag talk about books and help to explain the things they think you can do with them in their funny Zogcast!
5	Summer Holidays	29 July 2016	Zig and Zag discover all things great and dull about the summer holidays in their latest Zogcast! Time to chill out, relax and the enjoy the fact that there's no school!
6	Olympics	5 August 2016	Zig and Zag report about the Olympic Games. They conclude that this is where every country on earth gets together in a big field and plays every game in the world.
7	School	5 September 2016 (online)	Zig and Zag give you the low down on surviving the next year of school.
8	Dancing & The Next Step	12 September 2016 (online)	Zig and Zag report on dancing and The Next Step right here on ZogCast!
9	Poetry	6 October 2016 (online)	It's National Poetry Day! But how was poetry invented? Something to do with Shakespeare being a ye olde traffic warden... right?
10	Spooky	21 October 2016 (online); 31 October 2016 (CBBC)	Who knew we got Halloween from a guy called Ian? Apparently Zig and Zag do...
11	Robots	26 October 2016	Zig and Zag report back to Zog about robots and the wonderful uses they have, like operating inside humans, going to outer space and the robots that eat your broccoli for you – the Ro-broccoli-bot.
12	Baking	7 November 2016 (online)	Are you big on baking? Love making a mess? Check out chefs Zig and Zag's latest Zogcast all about baking!
13	Bullying	14 November 2016 (online) 15 November 2016 (CBBC)	Zig and Zag report back to Zog about bullying. They explain if you're being bullied you should speak to someone you trust, tell a teacher if you're being bullied in school and to talk to a parent or carer.
14	Charity	18 November 2016 (online)	Zig and Zag discover the history of charity and all the different ways you can raise money – like a bake sale!
15	Hospital	30 November 2016 (online)	Mackrel Jelly, Doctors and Nurses! Zig and Zag discuss all things hospital in their funny Zogcast!
16	Christmas	14 December 2016	Zag reveals the legend of a man in a red jumpsuit who travels around with a magical sleigh.
17	We Love CBBC	23 December 2016	Zig and Zag report back to Zog about the greatest Earthling thing ever – CBBC! Imagine a place where there are all your favourite shows live and games and apps. They even get the help of Hacker T. Dog, the CBBC expert, to explain just how amazing CBBC is!
18	Singing	1 January 2017 (CBBC)	Zig and Zag report back to Zog about the earthlings' love of singing. They describe it as adding words to music and the wonderful thing about it is that everyone can do it.
19	Love	14 February 2017	Zig is in love with many things, like Lindsey and banana curry, but where does Valentine's Day even come from? Zag's here to explain!
20	Science	20 February 2017	Zig and Zag report back to Zog about science and explain it's not boring. Science is all about finding answers.
21	Pets	21 February 2017	Zig and Zag report back to Zog about the great Earth tradition of pets. Pets are animals that humans adopt and make part of their family.
22	Healthy	22 February 2017	Zig and Zag report back to Zog about how Earthlings like to be healthy and keep fit. They discuss the importance of healthy haddock smoothies.

== Music ==
- Theme Tune: The forty second theme tune entitled ‘5,4,3,2,1’ was created by Ricky Wilson and Simon Rix from British indie rock band Kaiser Chiefs who were fans of Zig and Zag from their time of The Big Breakfast.
- The Zog Drop: In every episode when Zig and Zag have that eureka moment that sends them on their way to glory (or failure) they burst into a spontaneous Haka style dance created by Jonathan Casey, a composer for the series.
