= Planet Cosmo =

Children's animated television series

- Also known as: Planeetta Kosmo
- Created by: Jason Tammemagi
- Country of origin: Ireland
- Original language: English
- No. of seasons: 1
- No. of episodes: 15

Production
- Running time: 13 minutes
- Production company: Geronimo Productions

Original release
- Network: RTEjr
- Release: 18 February 2013

Planet Cosmo is an Irish children's animated television series about space. The series formerly aired on RTÉjr.

== Premise ==
Cosmo and her family live on the moon and explore space together. Through songs and adventure, Cosmo learns about all of the planets in the Solar System.

== Characters ==
Cosmo (voiced by Ali Lyons) The 5 year-old main character of the series. She is a young astronaut who loves to go explore the planets with Dad.

Sol (voiced by Elijah O'Sullivan) A younger astronaut who is Cosmo's little brother. He speaks in a lisp.

Dad (voiced by Jason Tammemägi) Cosmo's dad; he is very silly and sometimes clumsy.

Mum (voiced by Doireann Ní Chorragáin) Cosmo's mum; she is very sensitive and a professional and sometimes stubborn.

GIL (voiced by Paul Tylak) A supercomputer who sometimes crashes.

Lifter (voiced by Paul Tylak) A rover who's strong and sometimes clumsy.

Cian (voiced by Cian Vaughan (voiced by himself)) is the astronomer to teach the kids about the planets. He is both animated and in live-action in two different versions.

== Release ==
A 3-hour, 195-minute-long double DVD was released with 15 episodes.
