= Marriage Lines =

British TV sitcom (1963–1966)

- Richard Briers as George Starling and Prunella Scales as Kate Starling
- Also known as: The Marriage Lines
- Genre: Sitcom
- Written by: Richard Waring
- Starring: Richard Briers; Prunella Scales; Edward de Souza; Diana King; Geoffrey Sumner; Peter Tuddenham; Christine Finn; Ronald Hines; Derek Benfield
- Country of origin: United Kingdom
- Original language: English
- No. of series: 5
- No. of episodes: 44 + 2 shorts

Production
- Running time: 25 minutes (series 1–4); 30 minutes (series 5)

Original release
- Network: BBC 1
- Release: 16 August 1963 – 3 June 1966

Marriage Lines is a British television sitcom first broadcast between 1963 and 1966. The series gave Richard Briers and Prunella Scales, its lead stars, a significant boost in their careers. At first titled The Marriage Lines, the programme was written by Richard Waring, and was later adapted for radio.

== Cast ==
- Richard Briers as George Starling
- Prunella Scales as Kate Starling
- Edward de Souza as Miles
- Ronald Hines as Peter
- Christine Finn as Norah
- Diana King as Mrs Starling
- Geoffrey Sumner as Mr Starling
- Dorothy Black as Kate's mother
- Juliet Harmer as Sandra
- Tony Wright as Harry
- Derek Benfield as Harold
- Katy Wild as Ethel
- Jonathan Cecil as Dave

== Background ==
When Richard Waring was writing Marriage Lines, he had Richard Briers in mind, and also worked with him on Brothers in Law. Graeme Muir, the producer of Marriage Lines, also worked on Brothers in Law. In early episodes, The Marriage Lines was subtitled A Quizzical Look at the Early Days of Married Life.

== Plot ==
George and Kate Starling are a newly married couple, and the comedy comes from many ordinary domestic situations. George is a junior clerk in an office and wants the public house camaraderie of the single man in his office, while Kate gets increasingly frustrated by her domestic duties. In the third series, Kate gives birth to a daughter, Helen. The last episode of the fourth series, "Goodbye George – Goodbye Kate", shows the couple going to live in Lagos, Nigeria because of George's job. This was meant to be the last episode, however a fifth series was commissioned. The Starlings return to England as Kate is pregnant again, and gives birth in the final episode.

== Episodes ==
All episodes are 25 minutes, except the fifth series, when the episodes are 30 minutes long. Many episodes are missing from the television archives.

=== Series One (1963) ===
1. "The Threshold" (16 August 1963)
2. "Trial Separation" (23 August 1963)
3. "The Bed" (30 August 1963)
4. "The Parting" (6 September 1963)
5. "Four-Part Harmony" (13 September 1963)
6. "The Old Flame" (20 September 1963)
7. "The Good Neighbours" (27 September 1963)
8. "Party Mood" (4 October 1963)
9. "The Anniversary" (11 October 1963)
10. "The Old Place" (18 October 1963)

=== Christmas Special (1963) ===
- Short special as part of Christmas Night with the Stars (25 December 1963, missing)

=== Series Two (1964) ===
Entire series not known to survive.

1. "The Job" (22 May 1964)
2. "The Loan" (29 May 1964)
3. "Among Our Souvenirs" (5 June 1964)
4. "The Move" (12 June 1964)
5. "The Convention" (19 June 1964)
6. "Happy Birthday" (26 June 1964)
7. "Celebration Night" (28 June 1964)
8. "The Patient" (5 July 1964)
9. "The Martyr" (12 July 1964)
10. "Holiday Attractions" (19 July 1964)
11. "Financial Consideration" (26 July 1964)
12. "The Divorce" (2 August 1964)
13. "A Nice Surprise" (9 August 1964)

=== Christmas Special (1964) ===
- Short special as part of Christmas Night with the Stars (25 December 64)

=== Series Three (1965) ===
1. "The Cuckoo" (5 January 1965)
2. "The Waiting Game" (12 January 1965)
3. "And Baby Makes Three" (19 January 1965)
4. "Nest of Starlings" (26 January 1965)
5. "The Ladies' Man" (2 February 1965)
6. "The Homecoming" (9 February 1965)
7. "Night of Nostalgia" (16 February 1965)

=== Series Four (1965) ===
Entire series not known to survive.

1. "What's in a Name" (22 August 1965)
2. "The Dinner" (29 August 1965)
3. "Serenade in Two Flats" (5 September 1965)
4. "Tropical Magic" (12 September 1965)
5. "Migration of Starlings" (19 September 1965)
6. "Goodbye George – Goodbye Kate" (26 September 1965)

=== Series Five (1966) ===
Entire series not known to survive, except where noted.

1. "The New Start" (22 April 1966)
2. "Back to the Beginning" (29 April 1966)
3. "Home Market" (6 May 1966)
4. "Big Business" (13 May 1966, sequence(s) exist)
5. "Alarums and Excursions" (20 May 1966)
6. "First House" (27 May 1966)
7. "And Then There Were Five" (3 June 1966)

== DVD releases ==
Series One & Three were released on 4 February 2013.

== Radio series ==
Marriage Lines
- Genre: Sitcom
- Running time: 30 mins
- Country of origin: United Kingdom
- Language: English
- Home station: BBC Light Programme
- Syndicates: BBC Radio 4 Extra
- Starring: Richard Briers; Prunella Scales
- Written by: Richard Waring
- Original release: 21 May 1965 – 11 June 1967
- No. of series: 5
- No. of episodes: 43 and two short Christmas specials
- Audio format: Monaural

Marriage Lines was adapted for radio from 1965 to 1967, with Richard Briers and Prunella Scales once again starring. The scripts were also written by Richard Waring. The first series, of 13 episodes, ran from 21 May to 13 August 1965 and the second series, of 13 episodes, from 19 March to 11 June 1967.

The series was repeated on BBC Radio 4 Extra from 13 October 2014 onwards.

== See also ==
British sitcom
