= Orm and Cheep =

- Created by: Tony Martin
- Country of origin: United Kingdom
- No. of episodes: 26

Production
- Running time: 11 minutes

Original release
- Network: ITV
- Release: 10 April 1984 – 28 May 1987

Orm and Cheep is a 1980s British children's television series that was aimed at the younger viewers of Children's ITV. It used puppets as the main characters (Orm being a worm and Cheep being a bird) and was narrated by Richard Briers. The show was created by Tony Martin, the puppets created by Mary Edwards. There were a total of 26 eleven-minute episodes, broadcast between 1984 and 1987. The series was aired in the United Kingdom, New Zealand, Canada and Iran.

== Plot ==
Cheep was an infant bird who fell from his nest, prior to learning to fly (the theme tune, "If only Cheep could fly", ensured that Cheep's difficulties in learning to fly became a recurring joke throughout the series). He befriends Orm, a worm who inhabits a subterranean home. Their acquaintances include Snail and Mouse, all friends and foes have a single-word, noun name. Their notable foes include Rat and Crow, who often scheme to consume the pair.

== Episodes ==
=== Series 1 ===
- The Fall (10.04.1984)
- A Piece of Cake (17.04.1984)
- Cat Nap (24.04.1984)
- Down to Earth (01.05.1984)
- Don't Sneeze Please (08.05.1984)
- Eye, Eye! (15.05.1984)
- Strawberry Patch (22.05.1984)
- Cat and Mouse (29.05.1984)
- A House for Mouse (05.06.1984)
- What a Rat (12.06.1984)
- Silvery Trail (19.06.1984)
- Cheep Skate (26.06.1984)
- The Search Party (03.07.1984)

=== Series 2 ===
- Water, Water Everywhere (5.03.1987)
- Spring Clean (12.03.1987)
- Gone with the Wind (19.03.1987)
- Buried Treasure (26.03.1987)
- The Dark Wood (02.04.1987)
- Sports Day (09.04.1987)
- Ghosts (16.04.1987)
- Falling Leaves (23.04.1987)
- The Scarecrow (30.04.1987)
- The Terrible Three (07.05.1987)
- Cricket Tea (14.05.1987)
- Rat Trap (21.05.1987)
- Blow Out (28.05.1987)

== Cast/Crew ==
First series

- Creator - Tony Martin
- Director - Jan Martin
- Producer - Jan Martin
- Executive Producer - David Hamilton
- Artistic Director - Tony Martin
- Puppet creator _ Mary Edwards
- Writer - Guy Hallifax
- Narrator - Richard Briers
- Puppeteers - Mary Edwards, Geoff Felix and Ian Thom

Directors	Tony Martin and Derek Oliver
Producer	David Hamilton
Associate Producer	Claire Derry
Writer	Guy Hallifax
Narrator	Richard Briers
Puppeteers	Geoff Felix, Mary Edwards and Ian Thom

=== Australian VHS releases ===
- Roadshow Entertainment (2000)

VHS title	Release date	Episodes
Orm And Cheep: Water, Water Everywhere (102992)	4 September 2000	Water, Water Everywhere, Spring Clean, Gone with the Wind, Buried Treasure and The Dark Wood
Orm And Cheep: Eye Eye (102993)	4 September 2000	Eye Eye, Strawberry Patch, Cat and Mouse, A House for Mouse and What a Rat
Orm And Cheep: The Fall (102994)	4 September 2000	The Fall, A Piece of Cake, Cat Nap, Down to Earth and Don't Sneeze Please

== DVD release ==
In 2019, Universal Pictures Home Entertainment (as DreamWorks Classics) announced it would be releasing the entire first series on DVD (Region 2, PAL format).
