= Alf, Bill and Fred =

1964 film by Bob Godfrey

Alf, Bill and Fred is a 1964 short animated film directed by Bob Godfrey and written by Stan Hayward.

== Summary ==
The plot and the moral are both very simple. The three titular multi-species characters are friends who like to bounce a lot. Bill - the man - suddenly inherits a lot of money and starts spending it with reckless abandon (on, amongst other things, a tin of peaches). He abandons his old friends and becomes increasingly hedonistic. Meanwhile, the dog and the duck continue bouncing. Eventually, Bill accidentally bounces out of a window in a very tall building. He loses his memory and goes back to his old friends. They set up a business together selling happiness to people.

The moral of the story is stated to be: "It is easier to sell happiness than to buy it because most people are sillier than you are!".

== See also ==
- 1964 in film
- Independent animation
