= Ballybraddan =

Irish animated television series

- Created by: Noel McGee & Nora King Gerard O'Rourke (Original Concept)
- Starring: Amber Flood; Paul Tylak
- Country of origin: Ireland
- Original language: English
- No. of series: 2
- No. of episodes: 40

Production
- Running time: 13 mins (Season 1); 11 mins (Season 2)
- Production companies: Monster Animation (Season 1); Treehouse Republic (Season 2)

Original release
- Network: RTÉ (Ireland)
- Release: 30 October 2010 – 28 June 2019

Ballybraddan is an Irish animated television series first broadcast on RTÉ Two in April 2009. The series is produced in Ireland by Monster Animation in association with Raidió Teilifís Éireann (RTÉ) and the Irish Film Board.

== Background ==
Ballybraddan, based on an original idea by Gerard O'Rourke, was created and written by Noel McGee and Nora King, and directed by Jason Tammemagi. It comprises 20 X 13 minute episodes, and the action covers nine months in the lives of a disparate and lively group of characters. The series focuses on the fifth class pupils of Ballybraddan National School. The show follows them through the challenges and experiences they face through life in Ballybraddan, the fictional Irish town in which they live. However, it is their love of hurling, an Irish sport and pastime, that brings the characters together, and allows them to cope with life's challenges.

== Characters ==
Dylan - Voiced by Aileen Mythen - He and Beacon are unofficial leaders of the gang. He spends most of his time practising his hurling skills. He is without question the team's best hurler, and is known as 'The Special One'.

Beacon - Voiced by Ciaran Fagan - Is the most competitive hurler in the team. He is easily irritated and is called Beacon because of his frequent blushing. He has two sisters, Grainne and Fiona, while his mother Mary owns the local café.

Aisling - Voiced by Doireann Ni Chorragain - Isn't interested in hurling, however, is proud of her team's achievements and supports them in every match. She is Sam's best friend and has a mutual crush on Soc. She is known for her sense of humour but can stick up for herself very easily.

Sam - Voiced by Lucy O'Byrne - Is from Australia. She and her parents moved to Ireland recently. She likes hurling and is part of the team, and one of the star players

Soc - Voiced by Joseph Dillon - Got his nickname from his initials (his real name is Seamus). Is twins with Aidan. He's the team's goalkeeper, and has a crush on Aisling, which she reciprocates.

Aidan - Voiced by Joseph Dillon - Is Seamus' twin brother, however, he isn't interested in becoming a hurler, he much prefers to watch the team and support them in any way he can. He is embarrassed by his Aquaphobia. He often sketches in his sketchbook, with much criticism from some of the gang.

Solo - Voiced by Eoin Kavanagh - Known for taking being enigmatic too far. Although he often carries a hurley, he claims not to be a hurler. He moved recently to Ballybraddan from Crattan. He is very secretive and doesn't talk much about his old life in Crattan. Although the gang doesn't know, Solo was often bullied in his old town but was strong enough not to let it bother him.

Ziggy - Voiced by Cathy Downes - Moved from Poland with his family. He loved hurling the minute he discovered the game, and is now an expert when it comes to game facts and famous players; Ziggy isn't very good at playing the game, but practises more than anyone, simply to improve.

Speedy - Voiced by Aaron Gleeson - Is the bully figure. He, with his two sheepish sidekicks, Gerry and Seany, often mocks the other gang members, however, they aren't afraid of him. He declares himself the best at everything, saying "I am the 'champeen!". He secretly has a crush on Amber.

Gerry - Is Speedy's sidekick, who doesn't always agree with some of Speedy's actions, but often joins in anyway.

Seany - Is another of Speedy's sidekicks. He is very bright, and will automatically do what Speedy tells him to do.

Snips - Is the Ballybraddan team captain. He is responsible for motivating the team. He has a crush on one of the Ballybraddan girls but doesn't tell anyone this secret.

The Bantor - Voiced by Paul Tylak - Is the team coach. He wears the traditional tracksuit of Irish hurling managers, with 'Bainisteoir', Irish for "manager" written on the back, however, because some letters have faded with time, he has become known as the Bantor. He can be very strict, but fair on his team.

Amber - Voiced by Amber Flood - Has a mutual crush on Beacon, and is introduced in season 2.

Ruby Lynch - One of the characters from the rival club, named after actual Ruby Lynch who is real, she is known for her exquisite humour and wit
