= Robert Duncan (actor) =

English actor

Robert Duncan (born 27 July 1952) is an English actor. He is best known for his television role as Gus Hedges, the jargon-speaking manager, from Drop the Dead Donkey. He also appeared in Casualty as Peter Hayes between 1995 and 1996 and as Lazarus in the 2000 film The Miracle Maker.

== Biography ==
Duncan was born Robert Welch in St Austell, Cornwall. He took the first name of his brother Duncan as his stage surname. In 2008, he briefly taught History at Icknield High School, a comprehensive school in Luton, Bedfordshire.

== Radio ==
On radio, he appears in Old Harry's Game (also written by Drop the Dead Donkey writer Andy Hamilton) as Satan's sycophantic assistant Scumspawn. He was Mike in 'Life, Death and Sex with Mike and Sue' for Radio 4 which ran for three series.

He also played Gordon Way in Dirk Maggs' interpretation of Douglas Adams' book Dirk Gently's Holistic Detective Agency for BBC Radio Four in 2007.

== Theatre ==
He starred in Oscar Wilde's play An Ideal Husband from August to November 2008 with Kate O'Mara and Fenella Fielding. In 2010 he toured in a production of Agatha Christie's Witness for the Prosecution. He also toured Agatha Christie's Go Back for Murder in 2013.

Robert Duncan was in the cast of three of The Small Hand by Susan Hill and produced by Bill Kenwright Productions, co-starring Andrew Lancel and Diane Keen.

In 2016, Duncan toured in Kenwright's production of Rehearsal for Murder.
