= Goodbye, Mr Kent =

- Genre: Comedy
- Written by: Peter Robinson; Peter Vincent
- Starring: Richard Briers; Hannah Gordon
- Country of origin: United Kingdom
- Original language: English
- No. of series: 1
- No. of episodes: 7

Production
- Producer: Gareth Gwenlan
- Running time: 30 minutes
- Production company: BBC

Original release
- Network: BBC One
- Release: 28 January – 11 March 1982

Goodbye, Mr Kent is a BBC television sitcom, which first aired from 28 January to 11 March 1982. The series starred Richard Briers and Hannah Gordon.

Recently divorced Victoria Jones with young daughter Lucy takes in a boarder to pay the bills. But her boarder, the wayward and slobbish but charming journalist Travis Kent, sponges off her and tries to woo her.

It was produced by Gareth Gwenlan, and written by Peter Robinson and Peter Vincent.

The sitcom was cancelled after one series of seven episodes.

It was remade in West Germany in 1985 as Die Nervensäge and went on for 26 episodes. Peter Vincent and Peter Robinson wrote all of them. Episode 1 to 7 where remakes of the BBC shows, episode 8 to 26 were exclusively written for Germany. Dieter Hallervorden played the main character who was not called Kent but Willi Böck.

== Cast ==
- Richard Briers as Travis Kent
- Hannah Gordon as Victoria Jones
- Talla Hayes as Lucy Jones
