= Bob Godfrey =

English animator (1921–2013)

Bob Godfrey MBE
- Born: Roland Frederick Godfrey; 27 May 1921; Maitland, New South Wales
- Died: 21 February 2013 (aged 91); London, UK
- Height: 1.90 m (6 ft 3 in)
- Spouse: Beryl Godfrey

Roland Frederick Godfrey MBE (27 May 1921 – 21 February 2013), known as Bob Godfrey, was an English animator whose career spanned more than fifty years. He is probably best known for the children's cartoon series Roobarb (1974), Noah and Nelly in... SkylArk (1976–77) and Henry's Cat (1983–1993) and for the Trio chocolate biscuit advertisements shown in the UK during the early 1980s. However, he also produced a BAFTA and Academy award-winning short film, Great (1975), a humorous biography of Isambard Kingdom Brunel. Further Academy Awards nominations received were for Kama Sutra Rides Again (1971), Dream Doll (1979), with Zlatko Grgic, and Small Talk (1994) with animator Kevin Baldwin.

== Life and career ==
Godfrey was born in West Maitland, Australia, but his British parents returned to England while he was still a baby. He attended school in Ilford, and Leyton Art School, at first working at Lever Brothers as a graphic artist during the 1930s. During the Second World War he served as a Royal Marine and was involved in the D-Day landings.

=== Early career ===
Godfrey was taken on by the Larkins Studio in 1950 where he worked with Peter Sachs before leaving to set up Biographic with Keith Learner and Jeff Hale. Other members joined them later, including Nancy Hanna and Vera Linnecar in 1957. The company, set up to make commercials for ITV, was responsible for the first animated commercial to be shown on the network. While still working at Larkins Godfrey made Big Parade (1952) and Watch the Birdie (1954), a film inspired by a painting by Paul Klee, both were filmed in the basement of his flat.

=== 1960s ===
Godfrey subsequently made Do It Yourself Cartoon Kit (1961) which satirises animation and commercial advertising. The use of different animated forms, materials and techniques makes it one of his most exciting films to watch. The use of cutout animation for the narrator pre-dates Terry Gilliam's use of the technique, and the film is often mis-credited as being produced by Gilliam. Michael Bentine provided the narration for the film and worked with Godfrey on a number of films and commercials.

Godfrey's animated work during the later 1950s and 1960s continued to appear in TV commercials, but in 1964 he started his own company Bob Godfrey's Movie Emporium to develop his own creative projects including the children's cartoons. He was also responsible for a number of slightly risqué cartoons satirising British sexual habits, such as Henry 9 To 5, which was also awarded a BAFTA in 1971. He also animated the cartoons Alf, Bill and Fred and Two Off the Cuff.

As well as animation, he produced live-action commercials and short films. A number of them starred the artist Bruce Lacey, who appeared in Battle of New Orleans and The Hanging Tree. His interest in live action included a number of appearances in self-directed commercials and minor film roles, including The Beatles' film Help! (1965) and Casino Royale (1967). In 1965 he animated four episodes of The Beatles, an animated television series featuring the pop band, which had been sub-contracted out to different studios. Godfrey also worked as an uncredited adviser on Yellow Submarine (1968).

=== 1970s ===
Kama Sutra Rides Again (1971) was selected by Stanley Kubrick for screening with the UK release of his film A Clockwork Orange. Godfrey noted that "Everyone working in films knew Kubrick only ever phoned you to give you a bollocking, so when I realised he was calling to do me a favour I nearly dropped the phone."

In 1974 he produced Do-It Yourself Film Animation Show which was broadcast on BBC1 which encouraged children to do animation; each episode had established animators talking about their work and different animation techniques. Guests included Richard Williams and Terry Gilliam. The series has subsequently been acknowledged by a new generation of animators, including Nick Park, as a significant influence on them making animated films. For both Roobarb (1974–75) and Noah and Nelly in... SkylArk (1976–77), Richard Briers was the voice-over artist.

Godfrey was the director of the short film Great (1975), a humorous look at the life and works of the Victorian engineer Isambard Kingdom Brunel. The film combined animation with some live action sequences. Richard Briers provided the voice of Brunel. In 1976 Great became the first British film to win the Academy Award for Animated Short Film.

In the Thames Television documentary The Thief Who Never Gave Up, broadcast in the late 1980s, animator Richard Williams credits Godfrey with giving his career its initial impetus: "Bob Godfrey helped me...I worked in the basement and would do work in kind, and he would let me use the camera...[it was] a barter system".

=== 1980s and after ===
Henry's Cat, created by Stan Hayward and animated and narrated by Bob Godfrey, was first screened on 12 September 1983.

Bob Godfrey was awarded an MBE in 1986, and received the newly established Lifetime Achievement Award at the Bradford Animation Festival on 18 November 2007, with the festival including a retrospective of his films. His later films included social and political satires based on the work of Steve Bell, such as Beaks to the Grindstone and A Journalist's Tale. He worked with Bell again on the series Margaret Thatcher: Where Am I Now? He appeared on a number of programmes and documentaries on animation over the years, including the BBC 2 documentary The Craftsmen and the documentary series Animation Nation, shown on BBC Four in 2005. He also taught animation at West Surrey College of Art and Design (now University for the Creative Arts).

Bob Godfrey had a long association with the Royal College of Art. In 1985, under his direction and Dick Taylor, Animation became a separate course with the first students graduating in 1987. Godfrey was made a Senior Fellow in 1989. He told The Guardian in 2001: "I teach the basics of animation, then it's up to the individual. Great illustrators don't always make great animators. I've known people who couldn't draw at all who were great animators. You can always spot the ones with real talent. They don't listen to you." Godfrey received a Lifetime Achievement Award at the World Festival of Animated Film – Animafest Zagreb in 1992.

=== Death ===
Bob Godfrey died on 21 February 2013. He was 91 years old.
