= Roobarb =

British animated children's television series

- Also known as: Roobarb and Custard
- Genre: Animation; Children's
- Created by: Grange Calveley
- Directed by: Bob Godfrey (1974 series); Jason Tammemagi (2005 series)
- Voices of: Richard Briers
- Theme music composer: Johnny Hawksworth
- Countries of origin: United Kingdom; Ireland (2005 series)
- Original language: English
- No. of seasons: 2
- No. of episodes: 30 (1974 series); 39 (2005 series); 69 (in total)

Production
- Camera setup: Single-camera
- Running time: 5 minutes (1974 series); 7 minutes (2005 series)
- Production companies: Roobarb Enterprises, Ltd. (1974 series); A&B TV (2005 series); Monster Animation & Design (2005 series)

Original release
- Network: BBC1
- Release: 21 October – 24 December 1974
- Network: Five
- Release: 8 August – 14 October 2005

Roobarb (also known as Roobarb and Custard) is an animated children's television series, created by Grange Calveley and originally shown on BBC1 just before the evening news. Each cartoon of the original series, written by Calveley and directed by Bob Godfrey, was about five minutes long. Thirty episodes were made, and it was first shown on 21 October 1974. The theme is that of the friendly rivalry between Roobarb, a seven-year-old green dog with an overactive imagination, and Custard, the mischievous eight-year-old pink cat from next door.

The series later spawned a revival in 2005, which aired on Channel 5's Milkshake block. The narration of both series was provided by the actor Richard Briers. On 17 February 2013, Briers died, followed four days later by animator Godfrey.

== Original series ==
Roobarb is a green dog, and Custard is a pink cat. Roobarb is always involved in some kind of misadventure which he approaches with unbounded enthusiasm. Custard is cynical and sets out to sabotage Roobarb's fun. Which one comes out on top varies from episode to episode. Other characters in the series are the birds, who watch the antics of the other two from the safety of a nearby tree, often making snide remarks, and siding with whoever is winning. There is also a rather timid, pink mouse as well as the Sun and the Moon, who are depicted as sentient and able to talk to the other characters.

The series is animated in a deliberately rough style, using marker pens and a very sketchy drawing technique, so that the pictures are constantly "shaking". This effect, known to animators as "line boil", gives an energetic character to the show, and was a contrast to the slick, smooth colouring of the American Hanna-Barbera shows that were being shown on British television. The series was voiced by actor Richard Briers and the theme tune was written by Johnny Hawksworth for de Wolfe Music. It was the first fully animated television series to be made in the United Kingdom. The series was later shown in reruns on the American children's television series Eureeka's Castle on Nickelodeon, with the narrator’s speech redubbed in American English.

The cartoon was a success, greatly loved by children and adults alike, and winning numerous awards. The series was also known for its eccentric use of quirky word play and sight gags.

== 2005 reboot ==
A new series titled Roobarb and Custard Too debuted on Channel 5 and Boomerang (TV network) on 8 August 2005. Like the original series, it was written by Grange Calveley and narrated by Richard Briers, though Bob Godfrey and Johnny Hawksworth did not return for this series. The revival introduced a large number of other animal characters who also got involved in Roobarb's schemes. It was produced by Adam Sharp and Bernadette O'Riordan for A&B TV, and directed by Jason Tammemagi; the animation was by the Irish company Monster Animation & Design (now Geronimo Productions). The revival used flash animation, but kept the "wobbly" look and plain white backgrounds from the original series. The music for the revival was by Jon Atkinson. 39 episodes were made and clocked in at 7 minutes.

== Characters ==
- Roobarb - A green dog with a shaggy tail, two hairs each on the side of his head and a wild imagination. He's fond of bones, adventure, inventing and also seems to eat various things like coal, paper, books, chairs, shoes, holes in carpets, trees. Despite being short-tempered, Roobarb is usually very good-hearted and seems friendly to everyone he meets. He loves performing shows and is often helpful. His rival is Custard, his next door neighbour. Roobarb lives in a small cosy house, sleeps in a basket and seems to get on well with his rent free life. He's not always very bright, but is always curious. Although anthropomorphic, Roobarb does usually run and walk on all fours, barks like a dog and even has his own dog bowl for water. Roobarb is always deep in thoughts, usually for long hours until a plan has been thought. Roobarb thinks he's brave and handsome. He's usually always cheerful, optimistic, inventive and curious.
- Custard - A chubby pink cat and Roobarb's friendly rival and sometimes best friend. Custard usually likes to sabotage Roobarb's fun and plays pranks on him and often looks for the biggest laugh of the day. Although malicious and sarcastic, Custard has been shown to care about Roobarb and has even helped him out a few times and enjoys his company. Examples include when he dressed up as Santa Claus for Roobarb's Christmas party to help save it from being a disaster. Another example is when he helped Roobarb spook a group of tramps who retired to bed in Roobarb's house. Custard lives behind a large white wooden fence where he also takes his naps on top of it. Being a cat, Custard has a fondness for fishing, always trying to find his way to catch the fish, most of the time failing, he also envies Roobarb in competitions. Custard is also a very crafty cat, causing mischief and often getting the other animals involved. He's always grinning wide like a Cheshire Cat. Like Roobarb, Custard goes from antropomorphic to sometimes walking and prowling on all fours, even stretches, yowls like a cat and scratches like one. He is sneaky, sly, mischievous, greedy and sassy.

== Episode list ==
=== Original (1974) ===
No.	Title	Original release date
1	"When Roobarb Made a Spike"	21 October 1974
Roobarb, a curious dog, eats all kinds of things: chairs, shoes, books, paper, holes in carpets and trees but he tangles with a rubberband.
2	"When Roobarb Didn't See the Sun Come Up..."	22 October 1974
Inspired by a skating duck, Roobarb invents ‘golf’ and starts ice skating.
3	"When Roobarb Was Being Bored, Then Not Being Bored"	23 October 1974
After seeing a television program, Roobarb decides to put on a show for the birds, who are all wet outside.
4	"When the Tree Fell to Pieces"	24 October 1974
On a very windy day, the trees' leaves come off and Roobarb attempts to mend the tree.
5	"When Roobarb Found Sauce"	28 October 1974
Roobarb sets out to find the ‘sauce’ of the pond.
6	"When It Was Night"	29 October 1974
Roobarb dreams that he and Custard are 19th century US Cavalry officers fighting a band of "Crow Indians".
7	"When It Was Christmas"	24 December 1974
Roobarb plans a delicious Christmas feast and everyone is invited, but when the dog takes it too far and eats the whole feast, he is ashamed, until a special guest arrives and saves the day, yet Roobarb feels terrible for poor Custard not turning up, who is going to save the Christmas party now?
8	"When the Sun Was Just Right"	30 October 1974
Roobarb becomes a film director and directs a silent film called ‘’The Train’’.
9	"When the Opera Wasn't a Phantom"	31 October 1974
Roobarb builds a science laboratory in his cellar and tests out a new potion.
10	"When There Wasn't Treasure"	4 November 1974
Roobarb dresses as a pirate and searches for treasure.
11	"When It Wasn't Thorsday"	5 November 1974
Roobarb dresses up as Thor and offends the gods.
12	"When Roobarb Was Cheating"	6 November 1974
Roobarb feels he and everybody is out of shape, he plans a sports day and cheats his way all to the prizes, but in the end, he and the animals make the best of a very sticky surprise instead.
13	"When Custard Was Sorry"	7 November 1974
Police Dog Roobarb discovers that Custard has been stealing.
14	"When Roobarb Mixed the Paint"	11 November 1974
Roobarb decides to redecorate the house, and tempts the others to help him out. A bonus? Free cream cakes!
15	"When Roobarb's Heart Ruled His Head"	12 November 1974
Roobarb takes pity on a pack of stray dogs, only to wind up out of house and home himself.
16	"When You're Going to Fly, Fly High"	14 November 1974
When the birds don’t know where to go for the winter, Roobarb offers them places to stay.
17	"When the Day Didn't Arrive"	13 November 1974
The day has no colour, so Roobarb tries to force the North wind to come along.
18	"When Roobarb Did the Lion's Share"	18 November 1974
A lion is lost from the circus and his roaring attracts the attention of Roobarb, to cheer him up, he Custard and all the other animals put on a circus.
19	"When Roobarb Was at the End of His Tether (and So Was Custard)"	19 November 1974
Roobarb joins the Scouts and Custard annoys him by insisting he obeys all the rules to the letter.
20	"When Custard Stole the Show"	20 November 1974
Custard wonders how deep the pond is and goes on a pond diving expedition, building his own diving outfit and adopting the persona Jaques Coostard. Roobarb forms a plan to get the fish out.
21	"When There Was a Dance at Foxes Dale"	21 November 1974
Roobarb and Poodle Princess enter a dancing competition, but Custard tries to scupper their chances.
22	"When Roobarb Wasn't as Pleased as Punch"	25 November 1974
Roobarb performs a puppet show, but nobody (except Roobarb himself) finds it funny.
23	"When Roobarb Turned Over a New Leaf"	26 November 1974
Roobarb plants his garden and wakes up to find that a "big fat dreamy jungle" had formed.
24	"When There Was Someone Else"	28 November 1974
Roobarb makes friends with a shadowy boxer and challenges everybody to have a boxing fight with him.
25	"When the Day Wouldn't Keep Still"	27 November 1974
Roobarb gets hiccups and thinks it is an earthquake.
26	"When Roobarb Got a Long Break"	2 December 1974
To get revenge on his noisy neighbours Roobarb makes a noisy contraption only to get attention from the police.
27	"When the Pipes Call the Tune"	3 December 1974
A parcel arrives at Roobarb's doorstep, he's extremely excited, however, a surprise parcel arrives for Custard and he's delighted to know that it was because anybody who orders a set of bagpipes from Glasgow, also receives a package for their next door neighbour.
28	"When a Knight Lost His Day"	4 December 1974
Roobarb finds an old book which happens to be of his family tree, he decides to become a knight.
29	"When Custard Got Too Near the Bone"	5 December 1974
Roobarb plants bones round the turf for his garden party, Custard hears this and plans to sell the land for a lot of money to a gang of fierce dogs, but are the bones what the dogs expected?
30	"When There Was a Big Mix-Up"	1974
Roobarb becomes a hypnotist and everything goes wrong.

=== Reboot (2005) ===
No.	Title	Original release date
1	"When There Was a Surprise"	8 August 2005
Roobarb builds a new computer to help him with his inventions.
2	"When Custard Was Grounded"	2005
Roobarb organises a model plane air show for the garden and Custard nearly wins the prize trophy.
3	"When Custard Wrote a Book"	2005
Custard and Poodle Princess try to get Roobarb to relax on a nothing day.
4	"When There Was an Elephant"	2005
A travelling elephant, with a case of the sneezes, arrives in the garden on a very hot day.
5	"When Custard Was Very Very Naughty"	2005
Moggy Malone & Poodle Princess goes away and leaves Roobarb and Custard to fend for themselves.
6	"When the Books Went Bye Bye"	2005
Roobarb throws all his books out and challenges custard to a test of knowledge.
7	"When There Was a Wind-Up"	2005
Custard mocks Roobarb as he starts a new clockwork invention.
8	"When Roobarb Found the Hieroglyphics"	2005
Roobarb tries to find treasure after he discovered ancient Egyptian architectures underground.
9	"When It Ended in Tears"	2005
Roobarb experiments with a new invention for laughter.
10	"When There Was a Big Band"	2005
A famous musician arrives in the garden and Roobarb decides to put on a show.
11	"When the Garden Was Dry"	2005
Roobarb decides to irrigate the garden during a hot summer's day.
12	"When There Was a Time Warp"	2005
Roobarb persuades Custard to try some time travel.
13	"When It Was Cool to Be Smooth"	2005
Roobarb decides to get rid of the bumps in the garden and invents some trousers that help him hover.
14	"When There Was a Pottery Party"	2005
A new tea set is made for a garden party.
15	"When The Computer Went on the Blink"	2005
Mouse tries to help Roobarb with his computer and Virtually Impossible Helmet.
16	"When There Was an Opera"	2005
Roobarb writes a new opera to be performed by Moggy Malone.
17	"When the Mouse Arrived for Christmas"	2005
A festive moment as the garden puts on a pantomime called 'The Prince and the Snow Witch'.
18	"When Roobarb Went on a Fitness Drive"	2005
Custard persuades Roobarb to lose the fat and get fit.
19	"When Modern Thingumajigs Need Tweaking"	2005
Custard becomes an entertainment svengali and signs up Moggy Malone and Poodle Princess.
20	"When the Wind Blows the Space Age Will Stop"	2005
Roobarb dreams up a way to travel at high speed across the Space. Custard becomes his test pilot.
21	"When There Wasn't a Boiled Egg"	2005
Roobarb has an idea for some new fast food for his friends.
22	"When Rookie Fell Out of the Sky"	2005
Roobarb develops some silly wings in an attempt to help his old friend Rookie fly again.
23	"When the Laughing Had to Stop"	2005
Roobarb sets up an artist's studio and paints a masterpiece portrait of Custard.
24	"When Roobarb Was Bowled Over"	2005
Roobarb wants to make bowls more exciting.
25	"When Walter's Web Caught Roobarb's Eye"	2005
Mouse helps Roobarb build a web of information.
26	"When There Was a Dance Festival"	2005
Roobarb builds a dance floor and hosts a grand competition with a prize.
27	"When There Was Magic"	2005
Post Dog delivers some magic in the form of an old wizard for Roobarb and Mouse.
28	"When the Ballet Hit the Skids"	2005
Roobarb's Garden Ballet Company puts on its own version of "Duck Pond on Ice".
29	"When the Dinosaur Broke Loose"	2005
Roobarb investigates the birds' ancestors and starts looking for fossils.
30	"When Jeremy Barker Turned Up"	2005
On a day with no news, Roobarb decides to become a media baron.
31	"When There Was a Country Fayre"	2005
Poodle Princess recites some poetry, which prompts Roobarb to put on a medieval fayre.
32	"When the Molecules Got Loose"	2005
Roobarb and mouse come up with a very high tech plan to get Custard moving.
33	"When There Was a Duel"	2005
Roobarb and Custurd can't agree on anything so Rookie arranges a duel at dawn for them.
34	"When It Was a Wibbling Week"	2005
Roobarb devises a brand new sport that is good for players and spectators.
35	"When the Astrognomes Landed"	2005
Roobarb is woken up early one morning to find that gnomes have invaded the garden.
36	"When Everything Went Lumpy"	2005
Roobarb tries to find some bread for breakfast.
37	"When Communications Weren't the Best"	2005
Roobarb builds and launches the most amazing satellite.
38	"When There Really Was a Something"	2005
Everyone gets excited about a new film as Roobarb, Custard and Mouse search The Space.
39	"When There Was a Cuckoo"	2005
An unemployed cuckoo arrives in the garden and Roobarb attempts to get him back in time.

== UK VHS/DVD Releases ==
Between 1988 and 1990, Channel 5 released two videos of the 1974 series with ten episodes on each one. The first video was re-released by Entertainment UK Ltd and PolyGram Video (Cat. No. EUKV 2006) in October 1991, until it had a new re-release by 4 Front Video (Cat. No. 6356043) on 24 April 1995, until it was reissued by PolyGram Filmed Entertainment (UK) Ltd (Cat. No. 0463463) on 16 June 1997.

VHS Title	Release date	Episodes
Roobarb and Custard: When; Custard Stole the Show (CFV 05112)	9 May 1988	"When Custard Stole the Show"; "When Roobarb Wasn't As Pleased As Punch"; "When Roobarb Turned Over a New Leaf"; "When There Was Someone Else"; "When The Day Wouldn't Keep Still"; "When Roobarb Got A Long Break"; "When The Pipes Call the Tune"; "When A Knight Lost His Day"; "When Custard Got Too Near the Bone"; "When There was a Big Mix-Up"
Roobarb and Custard: When the Sun was Just Right (CFV 10372)	1990	"When the Sun was Just Right"; ""; ""; ""; ""; ""; ""; ""; ""; ""; "When There Wasn't Treasure"

In 1993, 4 Front Video released a single video containing 20 episodes of the 1974 series consisting of ten episodes from each of the two Channel 5 releases together in one video.

VHS Title	Release date	Episodes
Roobarb and Custard: When; Custard Stole the Show (20 Episodes on One Video) (0866043)	15 March 1993	"When Custard Stole the Show"; "When Roobarb Wasn't As Pleased As Punch"; "When Roobarb Turned Over a New Leaf"; "When There Was Someone Else"; "When The Day Wouldn't Keep Still"; "When Roobarb Got A Long Break"; "When The Pipes Call the Tune"; "When A Knight Lost His Day"; "When Custard Got Too Near the Bone"; "When There was a Big Mix-Up"; "When the Sun was Just Right"; ""; ""; ""; ""; ""; ""; ""; ""; ""; "When There Wasn't Treasure"

In 2000, Contender Entertainment Group Ltd released a single video with the first eight episodes of the 1974 series on it.

VHS Title	Release date	Episodes
Roobarb and Custard (KK 40023)	4 September 2000	"When Roobarb Made a Spike"; "When Roobarb Didn't See the Sun Come Up"; "When Roobarb Was Bored Then Not Being Bored"; "When the Tree Fell to Pieces"; "When Roobarb Found Sauce"; "When it was Night"; "When it was Christmas"; "When the Sun was Just Right"

In 2024, digitally restored versions of the original, alongside the revival, have been released by Fabulous Films in the 'Fabulous Films Kids Collection' range of children's DVD and Blu-ray releases.

== In popular culture ==
The Noah and Nelly in... SkylArk episode "During a Picnic" features a pirate ship called The Nutty Dog, the figurehead of which looks exactly like Roobarb.

The Streets' song "Turn the Page" mentions "Roobarb and Custard verses".

A sampling of Roobarb episodes and theme song made up the basis for the 1991 single "Roobarb & Custard" by the UK rave group Shaft, which reached #7 on the UK Singles Chart in January 1992.

The end bit of the theme tune could be heard at the end of each of 3 adverts for Ambrosia flavored custard.

Roobarb and Custard were featured in the music video for "The Official BBC Children in Need Medley" by Peter Kay, which contained many other popular cartoon characters. They appeared via a televised monitor as they were in 2-D animation, as opposed to the stop-motion style of the video and characters.

Roobarb and Custard became the stars of a series of children's books based on the TV series by Mogzilla Publishing in 2009.

The Roobarb theme tune appears in the Channel 4 comedy "Spaced" (Season one, Episode 4: "Battles") in a flashback as Tim is chased by a pack of dogs, and also as Daisy chases the pack itself.

Roobarb and Custard were used as mascots for the People's Dispensary for Sick Animals charity in the UK from 2011 to 2015. They were voiced by Ian Swann.

== Music by "Roobarb" ==
In 1975, singer-songwriter duo Sandy Davis and Paul Travis were commissioned to write and record an album for the Roobarb TV series. A single, "Roobarb's a Star" was released in 1976, closely followed by the "Roobarb" album.

All releases feature original artwork by Grange Calveley, and was funded/released by Bell Records.

== Broadcast history ==
- UK
  - BBC1 (1974)
  - The Children's Channel (1992)
  - Nickelodeon (UK and Ireland) (1993)
  - Boomerang (2005-2008)
  - Rewind TV (2024-present)
- Australia
  - ABC (1977-1993)
- USA
  - Nickelodeon (1988)
