= Richard Briers =

English actor (1934–2013)

Richard Briers CBE
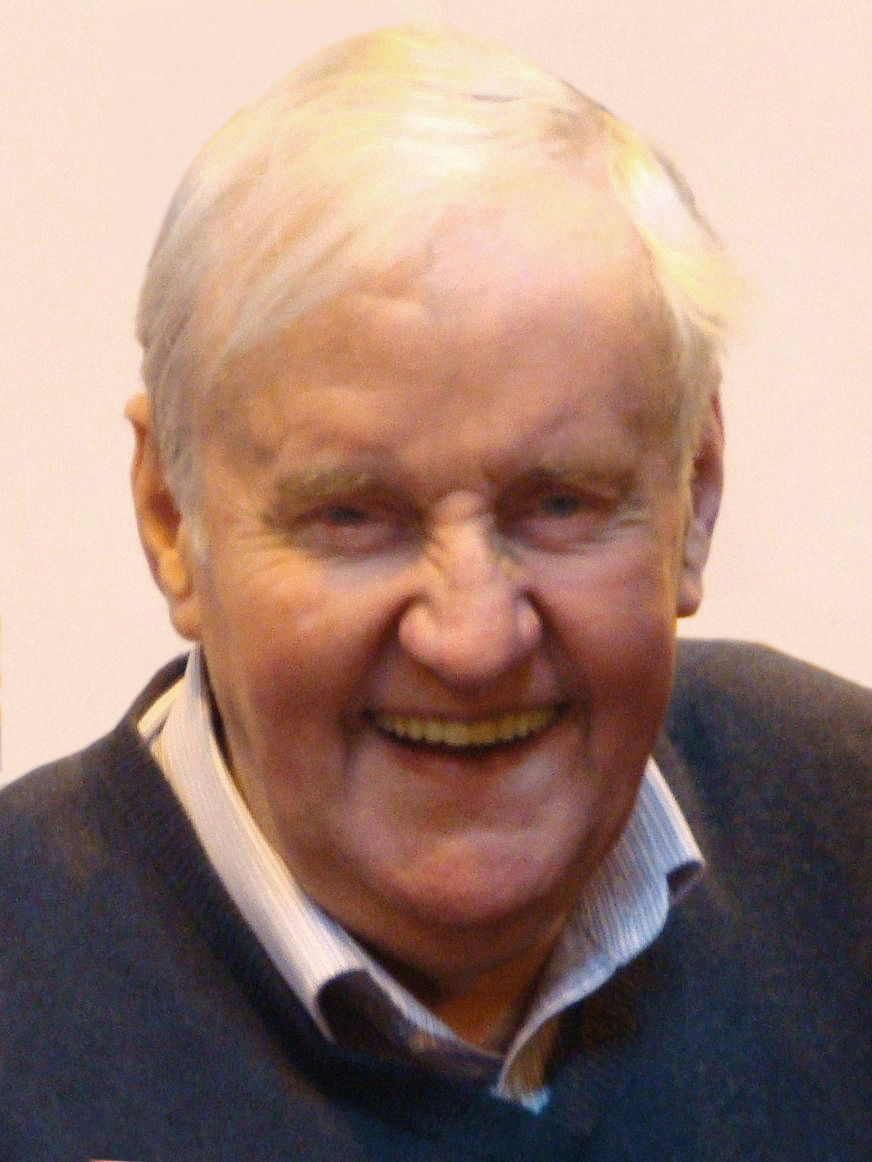
- Briers in 2009
- Born: Richard David Briers; 14 January 1934; Raynes Park, Surrey, England
- Died: 17 February 2013 (aged 79); Bedford Park, London, England
- Resting place: Mortlake Crematorium, London, England
- Occupation: Actor
- Years active: 1958–2013
- Spouse: Ann Davies (m. 1956)
- Children: 2, including Lucy Briers

Richard David Briers (14 January 1934 – 17 February 2013) was an English actor whose five-decade career encompassed film, radio, stage and television.

Briers first came to prominence as George Starling in Marriage Lines (1963–66), but it was a few years later, when he narrated Roobarb (1974–76) and Noah and Nelly in... SkylArk (1976–77) and played Tom Good in the BBC sitcom The Good Life (1975–78), that he became a household name. He starred as Martin in Ever Decreasing Circles (1984–89), and had a leading role as Hector in Monarch of the Glen (2000–05). From the late 1980s, with Kenneth Branagh as director, he performed Shakespearean roles in Henry V (1989), Much Ado About Nothing (1993), Hamlet (1996) and As You Like It (2006), and also appeared in Branagh's Swan Song (1992), Peter's Friends (1992), Mary Shelley's Frankenstein (1994), and In the Bleak Midwinter (1995).

== Early life ==
Briers was born on 14 January 1934 in Raynes Park, Surrey, at that time part of the Municipal Borough of Wimbledon which later became part of the London Borough of Merton. He was the son of Joseph Benjamin Briers (1901–1980) and his second wife Morna Phyllis (1909–1992), daughter of Frederick Richardson, of the Indian Civil Service. He was the first cousin once removed of actor Terry-Thomas (Terry-Thomas was his father's cousin).

He spent his childhood at Raynes Park in a flat, Number 2 Pepys Court, behind the now demolished Rialto cinema, and later at Guildford. In 2015, a Blue Plaque was unveiled outside Pepys Court, Worple Road, to commemorate his childhood home. Director of the British Comedy Society Aaron Brown was quoted as saying, "The Rialto Cinema was just behind the house, and it played a big part in him falling in love with show business."

His father, Joseph Briers, was the son of a stockbroker, of a family of Middlesex tenant farmers; a gregarious and popular man, he contended with a nervous disposition, and drifted between jobs, spending most of his life as a bookmaker but also working as, amongst other things, an estate agent's clerk and a factory worker for an air filter manufacturer, as well as being a gifted amateur singer who attended classes at the Guildhall School of Music and Drama. His mother, Morna Briers, was a concert pianist and a drama and music teacher, and a member of Equity, who wished for a showbusiness career, having acted in her youth. The couple had met when Joseph Briers asked Morna to stand in for his regular pianist for a performance; by this time his first marriage had collapsed and six months later they had entered a relationship. The family occasionally received money from a wealthy relation, and Briers's maternal grandparents paid for his education, despite not being particularly well-off, and having lived in slightly reduced circumstances in India before returning to England and coming to live at Wimbledon.

Briers attended Rokeby School, which at the time was in The Downs, Wimbledon, a short distance from his home and having failed the examination for King's College School, the Ridgeway School in Wimbledon, which he left at the age of 16 without any formal qualifications.

== Career ==
=== Early career ===
Briers's first job was a clerical post with a London cable manufacturer, and for a short time he went to evening classes to qualify in electrical engineering, but soon left and became a filing clerk.

Aged 18, Briers was called up for two years' national service in the Royal Air Force (RAF), during which he was a filing clerk at RAF Northwood, where he met future George and Mildred actor Brian Murphy. Murphy introduced Briers, who had been interested in acting since the age of 14, to the Dramatic Society at the Borough Polytechnic Institute, now London South Bank University, where he performed in several productions.

When he left the RAF, Briers studied at RADA, which he attended from 1954 to 1956. Placed in a class with both Peter O'Toole and Albert Finney, Briers later credited academy director John Fernald with nurturing his talent. Graduating from RADA with a silver medal, he won a scholarship with the Liverpool Repertory Company, and after 15 months moved to the Belgrade Theatre in Coventry for six months. He made his West End debut in the Duke of York's Theatre 1959 production of Gilt And Gingerbread by Lionel Hale.

=== Television ===
In 1961, Briers was cast in the leading role in Marriage Lines (1961–66), with Prunella Scales playing the role of his wife. For Marriage Lines, Simon and Laura, Points of View, Present Laughter - Excerpt, Charley's Aunt and To You at Home Today, Briers was nominated for the British Academy Television Award for Best Actor in 1966. In between the pilot and the series itself, Briers appeared in Brothers in Law (from the book by Henry Cecil) as callow barrister Roger Thursby in 1962. He was cast in this role by adaptors Frank Muir and Denis Norden, who had seen him in the West End.

His other early appearances included The Seven Faces of Jim (1961) with Jimmy Edwards, Dixon of Dock Green (1962), a production of Noël Coward's Hay Fever (1968) and the storyteller in several episodes of Jackanory (1969). In 1970, he starred in the Ben Travers farce "Rookery Nook", shown on the BBC. In the 1980s he played several Shakespearean roles, including Twelfth Night.

Briers was a subject of This Is Your Life on two occasions, in May 1972 and in March 1994.

In a role specifically written for him by John Esmonde and Bob Larbey, Briers was cast in the lead role in The Good Life (1975–78), playing Tom Good, a draughtsman who decides, on his 40th birthday, to give up his job and try his hand at self-sufficiency, with the support of his wife Barbara, played by Felicity Kendal. Briers persuaded the producers to cast his friend Paul Eddington, a fellow council member of Equity, in the role of Jerry. An enormously successful series, the last episode in 1978 was performed in front of Queen Elizabeth II. In 1977, he starred with his The Good Life co-star Penelope Keith in the televised version of Alan Ayckbourn's trilogy The Norman Conquests. He also starred as Ralph in 13 episodes of The Other One (1977–79) with Michael Gambon. In 1977, for The Good Life and One-Upmanship, he was nominated for the British Academy Television Award for Best Light Entertainment Performance.

During the 1980s and 1990s, Briers had leading roles in several television shows, including Goodbye, Mr Kent (1982), a rare failure also featuring Hannah Gordon; the lead role of Martin Bryce in Ever Decreasing Circles (1984–89); and as Godfrey Spry in the BBC comedy drama If You See God, Tell Him (1993). He also starred in All in Good Faith (1985), Tales of the Unexpected as Albert Dobson (in episode 9/4 "The Verger" – 1988), and the first episode of Mr. Bean (1990) as Mr. Sprout. In 1987, he appeared as the principal villain in the Doctor Who serial Paradise Towers, a performance which was described by Radio Times writer Patrick Mulkern as Briers's "career low". In 1995, he played the character Tony Fairfax in the BBC comedy Down to Earth. In the Inspector Morse episode "Death is Now My Neighbour", he played the evil master of Lonsdale College, Sir Clixby Bream.

During the 2000s, Briers was the curmudgeonly and extravagant father Hector MacDonald in the BBC television programme Monarch of the Glen (2000–05), appearing in series 1, 2, 3 and 7. Also in the 2000s, specifically 2006, he appeared in an episode of New Tricks entitled Old Dogs playing a character called James Farlow.

=== Stage work ===
Briers spent much of his career in the theatre, including appearances in plays by Shakespeare and George Bernard Shaw. In 1967, one of his earliest successes was playing alongside Michael Hordern and Celia Johnson in the London production of Alan Ayckbourn's Relatively Speaking.

After a long career in television sitcom, and looking to expand his career, his daughter Lucy took him to Stratford-upon-Avon to watch Kenneth Branagh in Henry V. After meeting Branagh backstage after the performance, Branagh offered Briers the role of Malvolio in the Renaissance Theatre Company production of Twelfth Night. Briers joined the company, and went on to play title parts in King Lear and Uncle Vanya. Briers also appeared in many of Branagh's films, including Henry V (1989, as Bardolph), Much Ado About Nothing (1993, as Signor Leonato) and Hamlet (1996, as Polonius). The theatre production of Twelfth Night (1988) was adapted for television, with Briers reprising his role as Malvolio.

In 1990, Briers appeared in The Wind in the Willows at the National Theatre, which earnt him a nomination for the following year's Laurence Olivier Award for Best Comedy Performance.

In 2010, Briers played in the Royal National Theatre revival of Dion Boucicault's London Assurance, alongside Simon Russell Beale and Fiona Shaw. A performance of this was broadcast live to cinemas round the world as part of the NT Live! programme. He also played the character of Captain Bluntschli, in George Bernard Shaw's play Arms and the Man.

=== Film ===
Briers made his film début in the British feature film Bottoms Up (1960). He then took parts in Murder She Said (1961), The Girl on the Boat (1962), A Matter of WHO (1962), The V.I.P.s (1963); and Raquel Welch's spy spoof Fathom (1967).

He later appeared in Michael Winner's A Chorus of Disapproval (1988) and the film Unconditional Love (2002), as well as the Kenneth Branagh adaptation of Much Ado About Nothing (1993), in which he played the role of Leonato. In 1997 he played the Archbishop of Canterbury, a minor role in the film Spice World. His last film was Cockneys vs Zombies (2012).

=== Radio and voice work ===
He was a familiar voice actor. Briers narrated the animated children's TV programme Roobarb (1974). Originally shown on BBC1 just before the evening news, each five-minute cartoon was written by Grange Calveley and produced by Bob Godfrey. He was the original narrator and voice actor for all the characters in the Noddy (1975) TV series based on the Enid Blyton character, and then another series with Godfrey, Noah and Nelly in... SkylArk (1976). He also provided the voice of Fiver in the animated film adaptation of Watership Down (1978). He also narrated and provided the voices for Orm and Cheep a TV series that was aimed at the younger viewers of Children's ITV. It used puppets as the main characters, broadcast between 1984 and 1987. In 1990 Briers provided the narration and voiced all the characters in the five-minute animated series Coconuts about a monkey, a king lion and a parrot who lived on a tropical island. The series ran for ten episodes and first aired on ITV on 23 April 1990. In the 1990s, he voiced the part of Mouse, opposite Alan Bennett's Mole in the TV series Mouse and Mole, based on books by Joyce Dunbar and James Mayhew. He voiced Ratty in several television-adapted animated versions of Wind in the Willows in 1995. He latterly starred alongside Neil Morrissey in Bob the Builder (2005) as Bob's Dad, Robert to his credit. As well as performing all 12 of Fiona Waters' stories on the 1995 Stories For Bedtime book for audio cassette, he recorded all four of the seasonal Percy the Park Keeper stories for a grand CD release based on the books by Nick Butterworth, creating memorable voices for all of the animal characters as well as Percy the Park Keeper himself. Briers also featured in the television series adaptation of Watership Down (1999–2001), this time voicing a series exclusive character called Captain Broom, and was one of the very few actors who stayed for all three series.

His work in radio included playing Dr. Simon Sparrow in BBC Radio 4's adaptions of Richard Gordon's Doctor in the House and Doctor at Large (1968), and a retired thespian in a series of comedy plays with Stanley Baxter in Two Pipe Problems (2008), and later the play Not Talking, commissioned for BBC Radio 3 by Mike Bartlett. In 1986 he narrated Radio 4's Oh, yes it is!, a history of pantomime written by Gerald Frow. Between 1973 and 1981, Briers played Bertie Wooster in the radio series What Ho! Jeeves with Michael Hordern as Jeeves.

Briers narrated numerous commercials, including adverts for the Midland Bank in which he was the voice of the company's Griffin symbol. Between 1984 and 1986 he made a series of commercials for the Ford Sierra done in a sitcom style portraying the Sierra as "one of the family". Briers narrated the public information film Frances the Firefly, about the dangers of playing with matches, firstly in the mid-1990s when first made, and then in the early 2000s when re-made by the Government fire safety campaign Fire Kills. He also recorded the voice of a satnav specifically designed for senior citizens in BBC 2's TV Show Top Gear, Series 19, episode 5, which aired only a week after his death. Presenter Jeremy Clarkson paid a brief tribute to his memory at the end of the episode.

=== Later career ===
After 1990, he appeared in Lovejoy, Inspector Morse, Midsomer Murders "Death's Shadow" as Stephen Wentworth in 1999, Doctors, New Tricks, Kingdom, and If You See God, Tell Him. Richard Briers starred as Hector in the first three series of Monarch of the Glen from 2000 to 2002 (and as a guest in series 7 in 2005), a role which saw him return to the limelight. He contributed "Sonnet 55" to the 2002 compilation album, When Love Speaks, which features famous actors and musicians interpreting Shakespeare's sonnets and play excerpts. In 2005, he appeared alongside Kevin Whately in Dad, a TV Film made by BBC Wales exploring issues of elder abuse. In 2006, he made an appearance in an episode of Extras, and portrayed the servant Adam in Kenneth Branagh's 2006 Shakespeare adaptation, As You Like It. He made a cameo appearance as a dying recluse in the 2008 Torchwood episode "A Day in the Death". In 2009 he appeared in Agatha Christie's Marple "Why didn't they ask Evans?" as Wilson.

On 17 December 2000, Briers was the guest on BBC Radio 4's Desert Island Discs. Among his musical choices were "Di quella pira" from Il trovatore by Giuseppe Verdi, "I Feel A Song Coming On" by Al Jolson and "On the Sunny Side of the Street" by Louis Armstrong. His favourite piece was the Organ Concerto in F major "The Cuckoo and the Nightingale" by George Frideric Handel.

== Personal life ==
Briers met Ann Davies while both were at Liverpool Rep. Davies was employed as a stage manager, and had acted on television and in films from the mid-1950s. Soon after meeting, he borrowed £5 from his mother, bought an engagement ring and they were married within six months. They had two daughters, one of whom, Lucy, is also an actress.

Briers and his friend Paul Eddington shared a similar sense of humour, and knew each other before being cast in The Good Life. After Eddington was diagnosed with skin cancer, Briers accepted a role opposite him in David Storey's play Home in 1994, agreeing to take on all of the publicity interviews to allow Eddington time for his treatment. At Eddington's memorial service, Briers read both from Cymbeline and Wodehouse; he later read chapters from Eddington's autobiography on BBC Radio 4.

In 2014, BBC Radio 4 broadcast Memories of a Cad, an affectionate comedy drama by Roy Smiles about the relationship between Terry-Thomas and Briers, played by Martin Jarvis and Alistair McGowan respectively. Set in 1984 when he had suffered from Parkinson's disease for many years, Terry-Thomas is delighted by the visit to his home in Ibiza of the much younger Briers, whom he recognises from television, and who proves to be his first cousin once removed. Briers cheers him up by recalling the career the film-star has long forgotten. It was re-broadcast in 2016.

As a result of Terry-Thomas's Parkinson's, Briers became President of Parkinson's UK. He also helped to launch a Sense, The National Deafblind and Rubella Association campaign. Briers was also a non-medical patron of the TOFS (Tracheo-Oesophageal Fistula Support) charity, which supports children and the families of children born unable to swallow.

Interviewed by The Daily Telegraph in 2008, Briers said that, while on holiday, he enjoyed being recognised, stating, "I'm gregarious by nature, so I love chatting to people. It really cheers me up."

Briers was a keen visitor of Britain's historic churches, and visited over one hundred for his book English Country Churches, which was published in 1988. Other books included a literary anthology edited with his wife Ann, A Taste of the Good Life, and a biography of Noël Coward and his theatrical legacy, Coward & Company. From his national service in the RAF, he was a supporter for a national memorial for RAF Bomber Command.

Briers was appointed OBE in 1989, and CBE in 2003.

== Declining health and death ==
According to his daughter Lucy, he stopped smoking in 2001 immediately after a routine chest X-ray suggested he would otherwise soon be in a wheelchair. He was diagnosed with emphysema in 2007.

Briers died at his home in Bedford Park, London, on 17 February 2013 of chronic obstructive pulmonary disease. His funeral was held at the local church of St Michael and All Angels in Chiswick on 6 March 2013.

== Tributes ==
The BBC referred to Richard Briers as "one of Britain's best-loved actors". Sir Kenneth Branagh paid tribute to him, saying, "He was a national treasure, a great actor and a wonderful man. He was greatly loved and he is deeply missed."

Briers's agent, Christopher Farrar, said: "Richard was a wonderful man, a consummate professional and an absolute joy to work alongside. Following his recent discussion of his battle with emphysema, I know he was incredibly touched by the strength of support expressed by friends and the public."

Fellow television actor Dame Penelope Keith said, "He was always courteous, always generous and always self-deprecating" adding, "He was also such a clever actor that he made you feel secure. You believed he was who he was portraying on the screen or on the stage... I just think of Richard and smile."

Writing in The Guardian, critic Michael Coveney described Briers as "always the most modest and self-deprecating of actors, and the sweetest of men," and noted: "Although he excelled in the plays of Alan Ayckbourn, and became a national figure in his television sitcoms of the 1970s and 80s, notably The Good Life, he could mine hidden depths on stage, giving notable performances in Ibsen, Chekhov and, for Kenneth Branagh's Renaissance company, Shakespeare."

On 30 March 2013, BBC Two broadcast a one-hour long review of Briers's life and career, with tributes from many friends and colleagues.

=== Ever Increasing Wonder ===
On Christmas Day 2013, BBC Radio 4 Extra broadcast a day of tribute to Briers titled "Ever Increasing Wonder", with a variety of his BBC Radio recordings, many of them introduced by those who knew him and worked with him. Guest speakers included: Prunella Scales, Stephen Fry, Michael Chaplin, Alan Bennett, Michael Ball, Kenneth Branagh, Ed Harris as well as Briers's widow Ann Davies and their daughters.

== Radio ==
- Brothers in Law (adaptation of the TV series)
- Doctor in the House (adaptation of the TV series)
- Marriage Lines (adaptation of the TV series)
- Largo desolato (by Václav Havel)
- What Ho! Jeeves (adaptation of the Jeeves and Bertie Wooster novels by P. G. Wodehouse)
- Two Pipe Problems
- The Wind in the Willows (by Kenneth Grahame, dramatised by Alan Bennett)
- Aled Jones's interview of Briers

== Selected filmography ==
=== Television ===
Year	Title	Role	Notes
1958-1961	ITV Television Playhouse	Various	4 episodes
1960-1963	ITV Play of the Week	Various	4 episodes
1961-1963	Faces of Jim	Various	
1961	Armchair Theatre	Stanley Frelaine	Episode: "Murder Club"
1963-1966	Marriage Lines	George Starling	
1962	Dixon of Dock Green	Ken Tracy	Episode: "A Path Through the Jungle"
1962	BBC Sunday-Night Play	Edward Kinnerton/Tassell	2 episodes
1962	Brothers in Law	Roger Thursby	
1966	Theatre 625	David Prentice	Episode: "Simon and Laura"
1968	BBC Play of the Month	Sandy Tyrell	Episode: "Hay Fever"
1969-1993	Jackanory	Storyteller	3 stories
1970	Ben Travers' Farces	Various	
1970	Rookery Nook	Gerald Popkiss	
1971	Birds on the Wing	Charles Jackson	
1974	ITV Sunday Night Theatre	Ronald	Episode: "Hearty Crafty"
1974, 2005	Roobarb and Custard	All voices	
1975-1978	The Good Life	Tom Good	
1976-1977	Noah and Nelly in Skylark	Voices, narrator	
1977	The Other One	Ralph Tanner	
1977	The Morecambe & Wise Show	Theatre Patron	Christmas Special
1977-1981	Play for Today	Mr. Smythe/Commander Jack Broone	2 episodes
1981	The Goodies	Narrator	Episode: "Snow White 2"
1982	Goodbye, Mr Kent	Travis Kent	
1984-1989	Ever Decreasing Circles	Martin Bryce	
1985-1986	Alias the Jester	Alias	Voice
1985-1988	All in Good Faith	Reverend Philip Lambe	
1987	Doctor Who	Chief Caretaker/Kroagnon	Serial: "Paradise Towers"
1988	Minder	Col. Caplan	Episode: "An Officer and a Car Salesman"
1990	Mr. Bean	Mr. Sprout	Episode: "Mr. Bean"
1993	If You See God, Tell Him	Godfrey Spry	
1993	Lovejoy	Raymond Doncaster	Episode: "Never Judge a Book by Its Cover"
1994	Screen Two	Old Arthur/George	Episode: "Skallagrig"
1997	Inspector Morse	Sir Clixby Bream	Episode: "Death is Now My Neighbour"
1997	Mouse and Mole	Mouse	
1999	Midsomer Murders	Stephen Wentworth	Episode: "Death's Shadow"
1999-2001	Watership Down	Captain Broom	15 episodes
2000-2005	Monarch of the Glen	Hector MacDonald	27 episodes
2005-2007	Bob the Builder	Robert	10 episodes
2006	New Tricks	James Farlow	Episode: "Old Dogs"
2006	Doctors	Jake Martin	Episode: "Running Time"
2006	Extras	Himself	Episode: "Chris Martin"
2008	Torchwood	Henry Parker	Episode: "A Day in the Death"
2013	Top Gear	Sat Nav voice	1 episode Posthumous Release

== Bibliography ==
- Hogg, James (2018). More than Just a Good Life: The Authorised Biography of Richard Briers. Little, Brown. ISBN 978-1-4721-2922-2.
