= Flickerpix =

Northern Irish animation company

Flickerpix Animations
- Industry: Animation
- Founded: 2003
- Founder: Joel Simon
- Successor: Johnny Schumann
- Headquarters: Holywood, Northern Ireland
- Services: 2D Animation, Motion graphics, Stop Motion, 3D Animation
- Website: www.flickerpix.com

Flickerpix is a multi-media animation company based in Holywood, Northern Ireland. Currently led by Creative Director Johnny Schumann, Flickerpix have produced a wide range of projects including On The Air; a mix of stop motion and 2D animation based on the Gerry Anderson (broadcaster) BBC Radio Ulster show. They have also produced the BBC Northern Ireland series Five Fables; an adaptation of Seamus Heaney's translation of five medieval Scots fables. This was narrated by acclaimed comedian/ actor Billy Connolly and scored by Belfast-born pianist Barry Douglas. Their collaboration with CBBC Newsround for the special Living with Alcohol went on to be awarded a BAFTA.

== History ==
Flickerpix was established in 2003 and began by producing animated stings for local TV station UTV in East Belfast.

Within the first two years of their founding, Flickerpix produced their first animated short film Horn OK Please which depicts a day in the life of a Bombay taxi driver. It combined a mixture of stop motion animation and 3D backgrounds. This went on to win over 16 international awards.

In 2006, Flickerpix created the animated TV series On The Air for BBC Northern Ireland which was based on BBC Radio Ulster The Gerry Anderson Show. Due to the success of the first series, the show was made into a total of four seasons and went on to win the Royal Television Society NI Comedy and Entertainment Award in 2015.

In 2008, Flickerpix became part of Waddell Media, one of Ireland's largest and most successful independent production companies, and moved to the seaside village of Holywood, Northern Ireland.

Following this, Flickerpix went on to create television series Days Like This and Wee Wise Words. They also produced over 7 minutes of specially commissioned animation for the 14 minute documentary Living with Alcohol, broadcast during the World Cup season on CBBC. In 2010, the documentary won the BAFTA for best Children's Factual programme. The company also produced a short film for BBC Comic Relief in 2009 which was written by Richard Curtis and voiced by Martin Freeman. Using a mixture of 2D and 3D effects, the film highlighted the problem of Malaria in developing countries.

In 2012, the animation studio released their second stop motion film Macropolis; a story of two toys with impairments who are discarded from a factory production line. Since its release, the film has won over 14 international awards, including Best Animated Short at the 4th Irish Film & Television Awards. In the same year, Flickerpix designed their first app called Macrophonics which was based on Macropolis.

Flickerpix developed the television series Five Fables which retells five medieval Scottish stories written by Scots poet Robert Henryson approximately 500 years ago. The fables were translated by Irish poet-playwright Seamus Heaney and Flickerpix adapted them into a five-part series for BBC Two Northern Ireland, directed by Dean Burke, which premiered on Thursday 13 March 2014. The fables included in the series are ‘The Two Mice’, 'The Mouse and the Lion’, ‘The Fox, the Wolf and the Carter’, ‘The Preaching of the Swallow’ and ‘The Fox, the Wolf and the Farmer’. The series was narrated by critically acclaimed actor Billy Connolly. Following this, the studio designed their second app Seamus Heaney: Five Fables in collaboration with Touchpress. The features of the app include insights from leading academics and an interface that allows you to move between Heaney and Henryson's text, as well as being able to watch the animated series. In 2014, the app was awarded 'Best App' at the Celtic Media Festival.

In 2014, Flickerpix designed their first game app Boogie Woogie which is a rhythm, dance and memory game built for iOS and Android platform and was programmed by Billy Goat Entertainment.

In 2015, Flickerpix collaborated with JAM Media and Double Z Enterprises to produce the animated TV series Zig and Zag, which currently airs on RTÉjr and CBBC. Creators and writers, Ciaran Morrison and Mick O'Hara, reprise the original voices of the beloved puppets.

In 2021, Flickerpix created the stop-motion Christmas film Da Humbug which received nominations in over 50 film festivals and won 4 awards. It also received an IFTA nomination. Flickerpix, for the first time, used 3D printing technology to create the film and this technique has now become a common part of the modelmaking pipeline in the company for their stop-motion creations. In 2023 Flickerpix created short stop-motion film Milo's Meltdown using similar techniques and needle-felted stop-motion short film One Track Mind is currently in production with a release date in the summer of 2024.

Along with Retinize, Flickerpix have also recently been experimented with motion-capture/VR technology and in 2023 they created a short satirical film called Charles and Camilla in which members of the public were given the opportunity to interact with 3D avatars of the King and Queen Consort, voiced in real-time by comedians Duncan Whisby and Debra Stephenson. The film won the Best Innovation in Animation at the 2023 Irish Animation Awards.

In 2023, Flickerpix created and produced CGI slapstick kids series Hop n' Zip. Funded by USP Studios, the series has gone on to receive 18 Millions views on their Youtube site.

== Services ==
Flickerpix provides a range of animation services including stop motion, 2D animation, 3D animation and motion graphics. Their clients vary from television broadcasting companies, such as Channel 4 and BBC, to advertising agencies.

== Filmography ==
=== Short films ===
| | Title | Release date | Awards |
|---|---|---|---|
| 1. | Horn OK Please | 2005 | Best Short Film- Irish Film Festival Chicago 2007 Best Short Animated- 4th Irish Film & Television Awards Best Animation- Cine-Jeune Festival in Saint Quentin 2006 Best Editing and Best Animated Short- ÉCU Film Festival 2006 Best Animated Short- FICCI BAF Awards 2006 Best Animation- Kerry Film Festival 2006 Best Short Film- Satvajit Ray Film Award London 2007 Best Animated Film- NAFF Bosnia 2008 Special Diploma for Character Reliability- Multivision Festival, St Petersburg, Russia Special Commendation- Galway Film Fleah 2006 Best Animation Studio Film Award- 24FPS New Dheli 2006 |
| 2. | Macropolis | 8 July 2012 | Best Animation- 10th Irish Film & Television Awards Best Animated Film, Audience & Director's Choice Awards- Sedona International Film Festival Best Short Film- Irish Film Festival Chicago 2013 Best of Festival and Spirit of the Festival- Focus Film Festival Best Short Film- Cine-Jeune Film Festival Best Short Film & Best Youth Film- 23rd International Film Festival 'Les Nuits Magiques’ Audience Award- Ashland Independent Film Festival Best Irish Animation Award- Blackrock Animation Festival, Ireland Best of Festival & Best Animation- Picture This Festival, Canada Festival Jury Award- Cinemagic, UK Best International Film Award- Klik Animation Festival, Russia ASIFA Award for Best Animated Short Film- International Film Festival for Children, Argentina |

=== Television series ===
Released Series

| | Title | Premiere date | End date | Network | Awards |
|---|---|---|---|---|---|
| 1. | On The Air | 2006 | 2014 | BBC One Northern Ireland | Comedy and Entertainment- Royal Television Society Awards Northern Ireland 2015 |
| 2. | Days Like This | 1 December 2008 | 21 December 2008 | BBC Northern Ireland | |
| 3. | Wee Wise Words | 20 December 2009 | 23 December 2009 | BBC Northern Ireland | |
| 4. | Five Fables | 13 March 2014 | 3 August 2014 | BBC Two Northern Ireland | |
| 5. | Zig and Zag | 1 March 2016 on RTÉjr 25 April 2016 on CBBC | Co-produced with JAM Media and Double Z Enterprises | | |

== Games ==
=== Apps ===
| | Title | Release date | Awards |
|---|---|---|---|
| 1. | Macrophonics | February 2013 | |
| 2. | Seamus Heaney: Five Fables | September 2014 | Best App- Celtic Media Festival 2015 |
| 3. | Boogie Woogie | October 2014 | |
