= Paul Tylak =

Irish writer, actor and comedian

- Occupations: Writer, comedian

Paul Tylak is an Irish writer, actor and stand-up comedian.

== Personal life ==
Paul Tylak was born to an Irish mother and Sri Lankan father, and grew up between Ireland and England. He attended the now-closed De Burgh School in Tadworth, Surrey. He has lived in Tallaght since 2002, and has two children Reuben and Calvin.

== Writing career ==
=== Television ===
Like many Irish comedians of his generation, Paul Tylak got his first TV break on the RTÉ show Nighthawks in the late 1980s. Tylak has since contributed to the writing of the RTÉ sketch comedy series Stew (2004-2005), which won Best Entertainment Series at the Irish Film and Television Awards in 2005 and at the Celtic Film & Television Festival in 2006, and to This Is Ireland, a comedy sketch series about Ireland made for the BBC in 2004.

=== Radio ===
Tylak wrote and co-starred in two BBC Radio shows, The Nualas and The O'Show on BBC.

== Performing career ==
=== Television ===
Tylak has appeared in a number of Irish and British TV productions. In 1997, he appeared with Joe Rooney in Messers [sic] Tylak and Rooney, a twelve-episode TV3 comedy travel series. In 2001, he appeared in the RTÉ soap opera Fair City, playing Ashti, a Kurdish refugee. As Tylak's father is Sri Lankan and his mother is Irish, he saw the role as an opportunity to challenge racial prejudices in Ireland. In 2004–2005, Tylak played various characters in Stew, the RTÉ comedy sketch series which he wrote with Paul Woodfull. Tylak has also appeared as Dr. Rashid in the children's show Roy set in Ballyfermot with an animated central character. In the UK, he appeared as Father Seamus Plug in the final series of Noel's House Party on BBC One in 1998-99.

Tylak is also a voice actor, having voiced Panda, Rabbit, and Snake in Skunk Fu! (2007–08), Lovely Carrot, a security blanket in Chloe's Closet (2010–14); GIL on Planet Cosmo (2013); and Pek on Zig and Zag (2016). In 2009, Tylak joined the cast of Ballybraddan, an animated children's television programme on RTÉ which focuses on hurling. Tylak voices 'The Bantor', who is manager of the local hurling team. In 2020, he appeared in Van der valk season 1 episode 2, with lead actor Marc Warren. In 2021 he appeared in the final episode of The Drowning, which was filmed in Dublin.

=== Stage ===
Tylak appears with the Dublin Comedy Improv Group. In 2003, he appeared in the play Hurl, written by Charlie O'Neill.
