= Noah and Nelly in... SkylArk =

British children's TV series (1976–1977)

- Genre: Animated
- Created by: Grange Calveley
- Voices of: Richard Briers; Peter Hawkins
- Theme music composer: Peter Gosling
- Country of origin: United Kingdom
- Original language: English
- No. of seasons: 1
- No. of episodes: 30

Production
- Producer: Bob Godfrey
- Camera setup: Single-camera
- Running time: 5 minutes

Original release
- Network: BBC1
- Release: September 13, 1976 – 1977

Noah and Nelly in... SkylArk is a British children's animated television series produced by Bob Godfrey's Movie Emporium. It was broadcast on BBC1 on 13 September 1976 to 1977.

== Introduction ==
Noah and Nelly was created by Grange Calveley, writer of the earlier and better known Roobarb cartoon. The five-minute films depict a world loosely based around Noah's Ark. However, Calveley's surreal interpretation involves two-headed talking animals reminiscent of the pushmi-pullyu known to Doctor Dolittle. Each animal has a cheerful, optimistic head at one end and an unhappy, pessimistic head at the other. Even the SkylArk itself is a longship with a figurehead at either end, one smiling, the other frowning. Although there is only one animal of each type, they are referred to in the plural, as in "Brian the lions" and "Rose the elephants". As with the earlier Roobarb, the main narration is provided by British actor Richard Briers. However, co-narrator Peter Hawkins manages to find a different and appropriate voice for each of the many animals.

== Story ==
The story follows roughly the same pattern in each episode. Captain Nutty Noah consults his map – which is completely blank except for a compass marking in the top right-hand corner – and randomly picks out a place to visit. The SkylArk is then shown travelling to its destination by balloon, on wheels, underwater with snorkelling figureheads, or occasionally even by sea. On arriving at their destination, the SkylArk's crew find various strange inhabitants such as talking television sets who are suffering some kind of problem they can't solve themselves (for example, the television sets are stuck showing the news over and over again and getting bored). The animals often help in some way, but the day is invariably saved by Noah's wife Nelly, who uses her knitting skills to create machines which solve the problem in some way. Nelly knits everything from drilling rigs to crash helmets; her supply of wool seems almost inexhaustible, but she occasionally has to unravel the ship's sails when she runs out.

== Episodes ==
- During a Savings Week (13th September 1976)
- During the Time We Were There (14th September 1976)
- During Tea (15th September 1976)
- During a Long Time Ago (16th September 1976)
- During a Stay at Reservoir Desert
- During Something and Nothing
- During a Smashing Time (22nd September 1976)
- During a Very Damp Spell (23rd September 1976)
- During a Steam Up (24th September 1976)
- During a Flower Show (28th September 1976)
- During a Wail of a Time (29th September 1976)
- During a Sweepstake (30th September 1976)
- During a Very Funny Day
- During a Visit to the Theatre (5th October 1976)
- During One Afternoon
- During a Picnic
- During a Frame-Up
- During a Journey Abroad
- During a Splashing Time
- During a Wild Day
- During a Jumpy Time
- During a Quiet Time
- During a String of Events
- During a Stay at Clockwork Canyon
- During a Very High Flight
- During Lunch
- During a Reading Lesson
- During a Fishing Holiday
- During a Seasonal Time (30th December 1976)
- During a Strange Time

== Home releases ==
The series was released on two VHS tapes in the mid-1990s.
