= Fluffy Gardens =

Irish preschool animated children's television series

- Created by: Jason Tammemagi
- Starring: Michael Maloney
- Country of origin: Ireland
- Original language: English
- No. of series: 2
- No. of episodes: 81

Production
- Running time: 7 minutes
- Production company: Monster Animation

Original release
- Network: RTÉ TWO
- Release: 26 February 2007 – 4 June 2010

Fluffy Gardens is an Irish preschool animated television series created, written and directed by Jason Tammemagi and produced by Monster Animation & Design Ltd. Each seven-minute episode tells the story of a different character, and the series is distributed internationally by Target Entertainment. The series premiered on RTÉ2 on February 26, 2007, and ended its original run on June 4, 2010.

== Plot ==
The series focuses on many creatures with different colors on their fur called the Fluffy Gardens. These include Paolo the Cat, Floella the Fruitbat, Mr. Johnson the Panda, Wee Reg the Puppy, Mavis the Pony, Fudge and Lily the Kittens, Tooty the Elephant, Lola the Mosquito, George the Mean Yellow Dog, Mrs. Toasty the Sheep, Lenny the Octopus, Colleen the Cow, Rex the Pig, Babs the Baby Bird, Chuckles the Chicken, Camille the Crocodile, Cornelius the Crab, Sparkles the Monkey, Bill the Platypus, Henny the Hippopotamus, Pertree the Bear, Stinky the Skunk, Una the Owl, Pip the Squirrel, Terence the Toad, Mildred the Mole, Polly the Pelican, Harold the Hammerhead Shark, Sebastian the Kangaroo, Scoopy the Pink Rabbit, Star the Sea Anemone, Poppy the Tiger, Mindy the Flamingo, Monty the Goat, Aunt Snug the Sheep, Royston the Mantis, Mia the Tapir, Max the Zebra, The Small Green Thing, and Nigel the Naughty Brown Mouse.

== Episodes ==
=== Season 1 (2007) ===
Episode	Title	Original Air Date
1	Paolo the Cat	26 February 2007
2	Floella the Fruitbat	
3	Mr. Johnson the Panda	
4	Wee Reg the Puppy	
5	Mavis the Pony	
6	Fudge and Lily the Kittens	
7	Tooty the Elephant	
8	Lola the Mosquito	
9	George the Mean Yellow Dog	
10	Mrs. Toasty the Sheep	
11	Lenny the Octopus	
12	Colleen the Cow	
13	Rex the Pig	
14	Babs the Baby Bird	
15	Chuckles the Chicken	
16	Camille the Crocodile	
17	Cornelius the Crab	
18	Sparkles the Monkey	
19	Bill the Platypus	
20	Henny the Hippopotamus	
21	Pertree the Bear	
22	Stinky the Skunk	
23	Una the Owl	
24	Pip the Squirrel	
25	Terence the Toad	
26	Mildred the Mole	
27	Polly the Pelican	
28	Harold the Hammerhead Shark	
29	Sebastian the Kangaroo	
30	Scoopy the Pink Rabbit	
31	Star the Sea Anemone	
32	Poppy the Tiger	
33	Mindy the Flamingo	
34	Monty the Goat	
35	Aunt Snug the Sheep	
36	Royston the Mantis	
37	Mia the Tapir	
38	Max the Zebra	
39	The Small Green Thing	
40	Nigel the Naughty Brown Mouse	
41	Christmas Special	8 December 2007

== Broadcast ==
The series was commissioned by Raidió Teilifís Éireann, and currently airs on RTÉ2 and RTÉjr in Ireland.

In July 2009, Target pre-sold British free-TV rights to both seasons to GMTV and CITV, who would share the rights with Cartoonito.

The series has also been sold to the Australian Broadcasting Corporation in Australia, Discovery Kids in Latin America (as Fofópolis in Brazil and Fabulópolis in Hispanic America), Knowledge Kids and TVOKids in Canada, and Smile in the United States. The series has sold in over 100 countries worldwide.
