= Jason Tammemagi =

Jason Tammemagi is the creator, writer and director of preschool show, Fluffy Gardens. He also directed Roobarb & Custard Too, Planet Cosmo, and Irish animated drama, Ballybraddan.

Jason was Creative Director of Geronimo Productions (formerly Monster Animation & Design, production company of Fluffy Gardens, Ballybraddan, and Punky) which was awarded European Producer of the Year at the Cartoon Forum 2011. He is now Creative Director of children's media company, Mooshku.

Jason has a background in classical animation and directed commercials before working on Roobarb with A&B TV. From there, he created Fluffy Gardens, which began airing in 2007. The show has now sold to over 100 countries worldwide. He went on to create, write and direct animated TV show Planet Cosmo and created children's app Dino Dog with Storytoys.

With Mooshku, Jason created the music video for Gunship's "Revel In Your Time".

Mooshku's Trufax Tot Cop, from Jason and Meabh Tammemagi, was selected for the Nickelodeon Shorts Program 2016.
