= Road to Now =

- Genre: Documentary
- Written by: Simon Nasht
- Directed by: Nick Warnsbrough
- Narrated by: Chris Bath
- Theme music composer: Sony Emi
- Country of origin: Australia
- Original language: English
- No. of seasons: 1
- No. of episodes: 6

Production
- Executive producer: Alan Erson
- Producer: Alice Taylor
- Editor: Jim Wilkes
- Running time: 55 minutes
- Production company: Wildbear Entertainment

Original release
- Network: ABC
- Release: 26 May – 30 June 2020

Road to Now is a six-part Australian documentary about the post–Cold War era, hosted by Australian journalist Chris Bath. It was produced by Wildbear Entertainment in collaboration with the ABC, which broadcast the show in 2020.

The show predominantly draws on footage from ABC news and current affairs shows, interspersed with commentary from former leaders, academics and journalists including Melina Abdullah, Christiane Amanpour, Helen Clark, Gareth Evans, Niall Ferguson, Thomas Friedman, John Howard, Yascha Mounk and Malala Yousafzai.

In each episode, Bath describes various interrelated events which occurred between the end of the Cold War, an optimistic period when many believed Western values and the free market had triumphed, and the current period marked by conflict and illiberalism.

Writing in the Sydney Morning Herald, Ben Pobjie described the series as a fine example of a deep-dive historical perspective, which although did not reveal much particularly new, nevertheless showed how unrecognisable the immediate post–Cold War era is to the current day. Inside Story's Jane R. Goodall criticised the script and Chris Bath's leaden delivery, which often lacked sufficiently deep perspective and failed to marshal structural and thematic clarity.

== Episodes ==
Age of Conflict (broadcast 26 May 2020)

The collapse of the Soviet bloc leads to the Yugoslav Wars. The West intervenes in Afghanistan and Iraq in response to the 9/11 attacks. However what ensues is terrorism, the Syrian Civil War and the emergence of insurgencies including ISIS and Boko Haram. NATO's eastwards expansion prompts a revanchist Russia to attack Ukraine and Estonia. Cyberwarfare becomes a potent weapon.

Global Shapers (broadcast 2 June 2020)

Profiles influential post-Cold War leaders and their relationships with the peoples they led: Mikhail Gorbachev, Nelson Mandela, Vladimir Putin, Saddam Hussein, Aung San Suu Kyi, Barack Obama, Angela Merkel, Donald Trump and Xi Jinping.

The Fight for our Rights (broadcast 9 June 2020)

The hopes that personal and political rights would flourish after the end of the Cold War do not materialise. Instead ethnic conflicts and atrocities take place in Bosnia and Rwanda, and the international community fails to intervene. Democracy and human rights retreat in Turkey under President Recep Tayyip Erdoğan. Saudi Arabia murders journalist Jamal Khashoggi with impunity. A surveillance state emerges in China, and commitments to Hong Kong's political autonomy are not met. The episode also looks at rights for homosexuals in Russia and Ireland, gender equality in Pakistan, the Me Too movement, Black Lives Matter and gun control in the United States.

Return of the Wall (broadcast 16 June 2020)

Instability, persecution and poverty in Afghanistan, Africa, the Middle East and Central America drive millions to seek a better life in the West. The war in Syria leads to the European migrant crisis. Attitudes in receiving countries harden, especially after Angela Merkel's open door policy and sexual assault incidents in Germany. Immigration becomes a decisive issue in the Brexit referendum and the election of Donald Trump.

Globalisation (broadcast 23 June 2020)

The end of the Cold War brings about economic growth and poverty alleviation, accelerated by the new technologies and increased foreign capital flows from the West to the East. Market forces rise in China, while India benefits from outsourcing. Financial deregulation in the United States results in the 2008 financial crisis, which has serious global impacts including in Iceland and Greece. Entrenched inequality and lingering unemployment help brings Donald Trump to the White House. China's growth is sustained through developing high tech capabilities, but trade imbalances, intellectual property theft and an increasingly aggressive posture make it a strategic competitor with the United States.

In Harm's Way (broadcast 30 June 2020)

From 1989 to 2019 the world's population rises from five to nearly eight billion, placing more people at risk of natural disasters. Seismic events in the Indian Ocean, Haiti, Iceland and Japan create carnage and disruption. Climate change contributes to extreme weather events including Hurricane Katrina, bushfires in Australia and rising sea levels in the Pacific. A succession of international summits produces the Rio Declaration, the Kyoto Protocol, the Copenhagen Accord and the Paris Agreement, but they are considered inadequate at addressing climate change.
