= Post–Cold War era =

Ongoing period of history since 1991

- 26 December 1991 – present
Cold War	Contemporary history
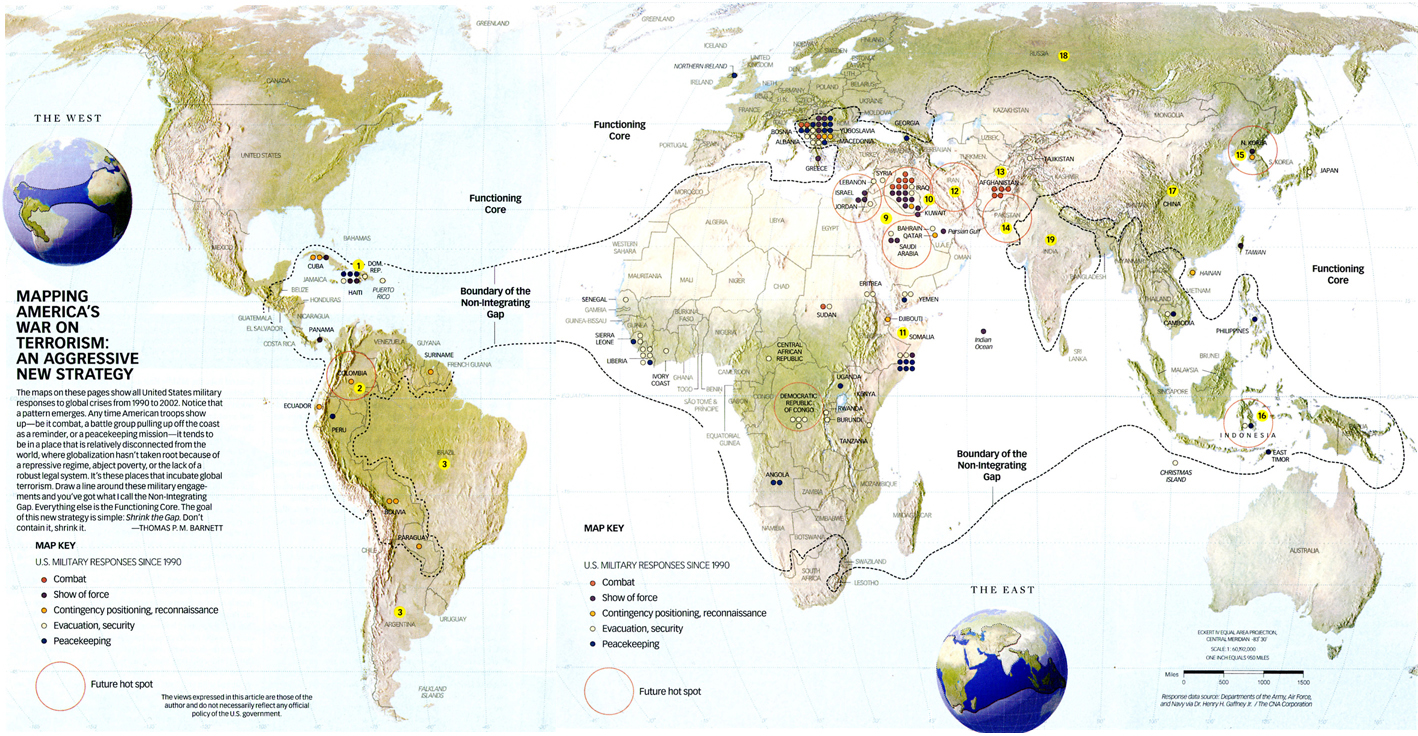
- Mapping America's War on Terrorism ("Pentagon's New Map")
- Key events: Dissolution of the Soviet Union (1991); Maastricht Treaty (1992); September 11 attacks (2001); War on terror (2001–present); Financial crisis of 2007–2008; Arab Spring (2010–2012); Russo-Ukrainian war (2014–present); COVID-19 pandemic (2020–2023); Middle Eastern crisis (2023–present); Operation Southern Spear (2025–present)

President Bill Clinton addressing a NAFTA products event. Free Trade Agreements like NAFTA are an example of the type of economic and diplomacy agreements which blossomed after the Cold War.

The post–Cold War era is a period of history that started with the dissolution of the Soviet Union, which began in 1988 and marked the end of the Cold War by 1991, thereby leaving the United States as the world's sole superpower. At the same time, Europe experienced the collapse of communism and led to the establishment of the European Union (EU) in 1993.

Relative to the Cold War, the period was initially characterized by stabilization and disarmament, but outbreaks in the 2020s saw many conflicts similar or greater in scope to the Cold War. Both Russia and the United States significantly reduced their nuclear weapons stockpiles, and most Eastern Bloc countries became democratic and were integrated into the global economy. In the first two decades of the post–Cold War era, the North Atlantic Treaty Organization (NATO) underwent three enlargements and France re-integrated into the NATO command, while Russia founded the Collective Security Treaty Organization (CSTO) to replace the Warsaw Pact.

China became a rising power and consolidated a greater role on the international stage while building a strategic partnership with Russia, with both countries working in BRICS and the Shanghai Cooperation Organization. In response to these developments, the United States began a re-balancing of strategic forces out of Europe and into the Asia–Pacific.

Major events of the period are generally agreed to have included the September 11 attacks and ensuing war on terror, the militarization of the war on drugs, the Great Recession, the China–United States trade war, the COVID-19 pandemic, hybrid warfare predominantly using the Internet, and growing concerns surrounding the AI boom, climate change, misinformation, information overload, and wealth inequality.

Major conflicts generally associated with the post–Cold War era include the United States invasion of Panama, the Gulf War, the Yugoslav Wars, the First and Second Congo Wars, the First and Second Chechen Wars, the War in Afghanistan and the Iraq War, the Mexican drug war, the Arab Spring, the Russo-Georgian War, the Syrian civil war, the North Korea crisis, the Russo-Ukrainian War, the Gaza War and associated Middle Eastern crisis and Red Sea crisis, Operation Southern Spear, the 2026 United States intervention in Venezuela, and the 2026 Iran war.

Historians and analysts in the 2020s began to question whether the Post-Cold War era had already come to a close, many citing the 2022 invasion of Ukraine as the end date and pointing to the rise of open conflicts and a new Great Powers rivalry between NATO, the United States and the European Union on the one hand and BRICS, Russia, China and India on the other, as indicative that an entirely distinct historical era had begun.

== Terminology ==
Historians frequently debate what to label the era following the conclusion of the Cold War. Discussions revolve around frameworks of political theory like "Pax Americana", which is derived from Pax Romana, Rome's golden age. Others point to the technological advancements as evidence that it is the Information Age, a label that is partly true as many modern consumer technologies were unreleased or in early stages in the Cold War. Robert Kagan has defined the era simply as "the return of Geopolitics", in that new alliances and rivalries are being made, largely around economic lines.

== Background ==
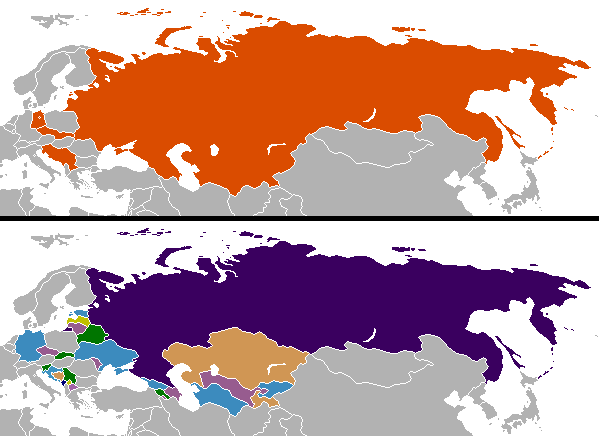
Map showing the change in international borders across Europe and Asia before (top) and after (bottom) the dissolution of the Soviet Union by 1991 and the collapse of communism by 1996

Faced with the threat of growing German Nazism, Italian fascism, Japanese militarism, and a world war, the Western Allies and the Soviet Union formed an alliance of necessity during World War II. After the Axis powers were defeated, the two most powerful states in the world became the Soviet Union and the United States. Both federations were called the world's superpowers. The underlying geopolitical and ideological differences between the recent allies led to the confrontation known as the Cold War, which lasted from about 1947 to 1991. It began with the second Red Scare and it ended with the fall of the Soviet Union. At the dawn of the new era, the historian John Lewis Gaddis wrote:"The new world of the post–Cold War era is likely to have few, if any, of these [Cold War] characteristics: that is an indication of how much things have already changed since the Cold War ended. We are at one of those rare points of 'punctuation' in history at which old patterns of stability have broken up and new ones have not yet emerged to take their place. Historians will certainly regard the years 1989–1991 as a turning point comparable in importance to the years 1789–1794, or 1917–1918, or 1945–1947; precisely what has 'turned,' however, is much less certain. We know that a series of geopolitical earthquakes have taken place, but it is not yet clear how these upheavals have rearranged the landscape that lies before us."

== Events (1991-present) ==
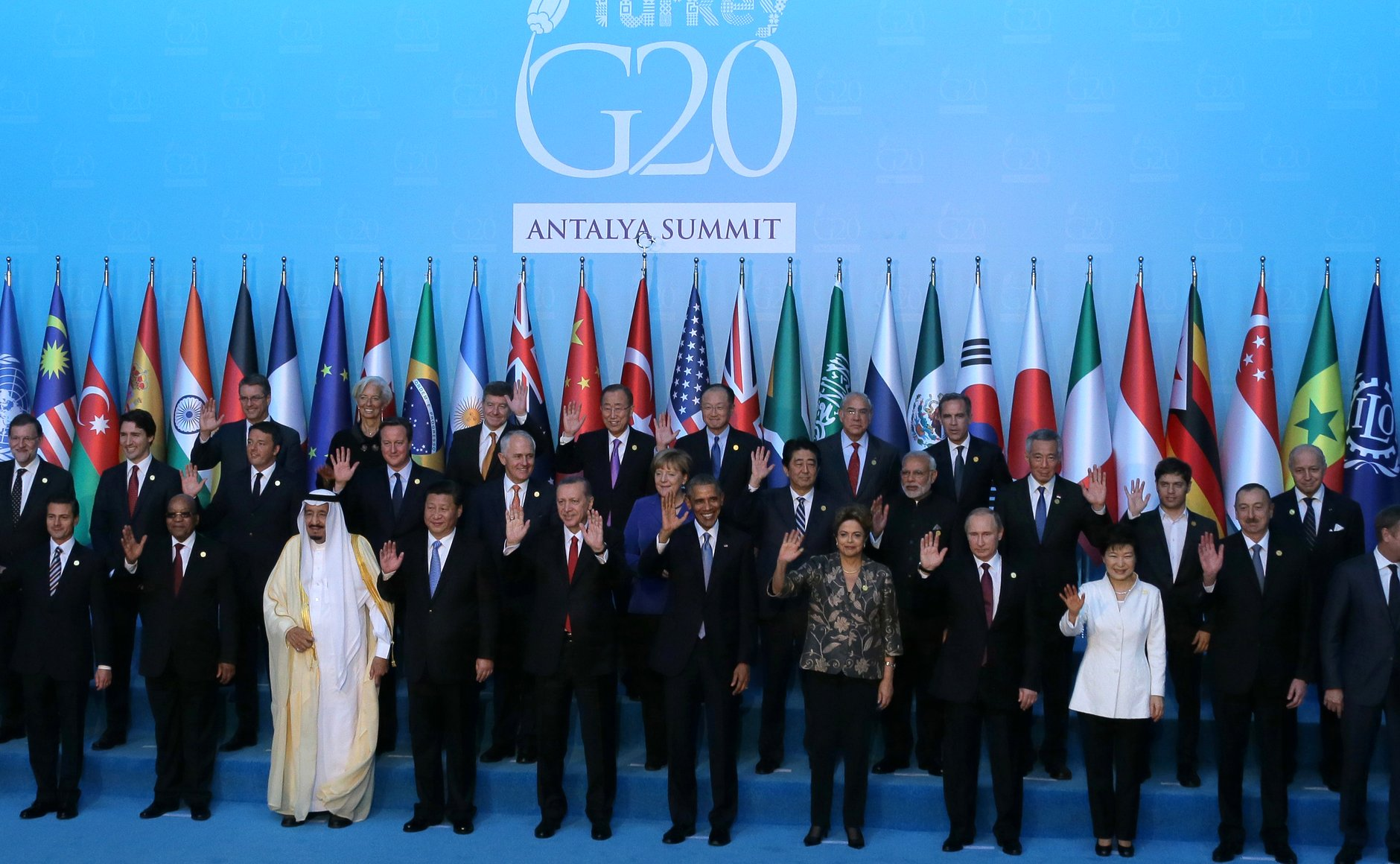
Participants at the 2015 G20 Summit in Turkey

The Post-Cold War era has paved the way for greater international cooperation, international organizations, and nationalist movements. The European Union expanded and further integrated, and power shifted from the G7 to the larger G20 economies. The outcome symbolized a victory of democracy and capitalism which became a manner of collective self-validation for countries hoping to gain international respect. With democracy being seen as an important value, more countries began adopting that value. Communism ended also in Mongolia, Congo, Albania, Yugoslavia, Afghanistan, and Angola. As of 2023, only five countries in the world are still ruled as communist states: China, Cuba, North Korea, Laos, and Vietnam.

=== United States foreign policy changes ===
==== Gulf War, events leading to 9/11, and the "Unipolar Moment" ====
Operation Desert Storm briefing graphic

Following the Gulf War, president George H.W. Bush held the National Victory Celebration in Washington DC. he said, "The troops of Desert Storm not only rescued a nation abroad, they transformed a Nation at home. Now let's use our strength and our credibility to take on challenges here at home.. If we didn't know it before Desert Storm, we know now: Nothing can stop us." The "unipolar moment" of the 1990s was a brief period following the Soviet Union's collapse when the United States stood alone as the world's sole superpower, unmatched in military reach, economic clout, and cultural influence. Coined by, Charles Krauthammer, the term captured an era in which Washington led global institutions, expanded free trade through agreements like NAFTA and the creation of the World Trade Organization, and championed liberal democracy as the dominant global model. With no rival superpower to check its actions, the U.S. projected power across the globe, leading a coalition in the 1991 Gulf War and spearheading NATO interventions in the Balkans. During this time, Saddam Hussein was left securely in power but facing a shattered economy and severe geopolitical isolation. Encouraged by a speech from Bush urging the Iraqi people to take matters into their own hands, a massive wave of uncoordinated anti-Saddam uprisings erupted across Iraq. Shia rebels rose up in the south, and Kurdish fighters launched an insurrection in the north, briefly seizing control of 14 of Iraq's 18 provinces. Facing an existential threat to his regime, Saddam responded with overwhelming brutality. The crackdown resulted in the deaths of tens of thousands of civilians and a massive humanitarian crisis that sent nearly two million refugees fleeing into the mountains and neighboring borders.

Syrian President Hafez al-Asad (centre) with Iraqi Vice President Saddam Hussein (left), Algerian Foreign Minister Abd al-Aziz Bouteflika (right), and Syrian Vice-President Abd al-Halim Khaddam (far right, half-covered) at Arab League Baghdad Summit.

Afterwards Saddam obstructed U.N. weapons inspections, hoarded hidden biological weapons, and intentionally drained the southern marshes to permanently destroy the Shia resistance. The Iraqi Liberation Act was signed in 1998 in response.

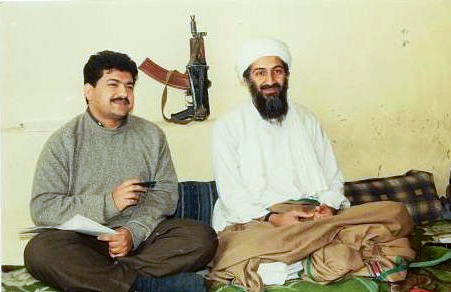
Pakistani journalist Hamid Mir interviewing Osama bin Laden, circa March 1997 – May 1998. Behind them on the wall is an AKS-74U carbine.

Meanwhile, Osama bin Laden viewed the massive influx of U.S. troops into Saudi Arabia during the war as a permanent, intolerable occupation of Islam's holiest lands. The victory America was celebrating in Washington became the ultimate rallying cry for al-Qaeda. Banished from Saudi Arabia later that same year for his radical opposition to the post-war U.S. military presence, bin Laden fled to Sudan, where he immediately began building the financial and operational architecture for a global terrorist network. Over the next decade, he would systematically target the "credibility" Bush spoke of, shifting from localized guerrilla operations to orchestrating a series of escalating attacks on American targets abroad, including the 1998 United States embassy bombings. The massive, coordinated nature of the blasts signaled that bin Laden was no longer a fringe dissident, but the commander of a sophisticated international front. The operational blueprint for a final, catastrophic strike began to take shape shortly after in 1999, when bin Laden approved a highly ambitious "planes operation" pitched by strategist Khalid Shaikh Mohammed. While sleeper cells were quietly dispatched to Western flight schools, al-Qaeda struck a devastating intermediary blow on October 12, 2000. A suicide boat packed with explosives detonated against the hull of the USS Cole while it refueled in Aden, Yemen, killing 17 American sailors and proving that al-Qaeda could successfully compromise premier U.S. naval assets.

==== China joins the WTO ====
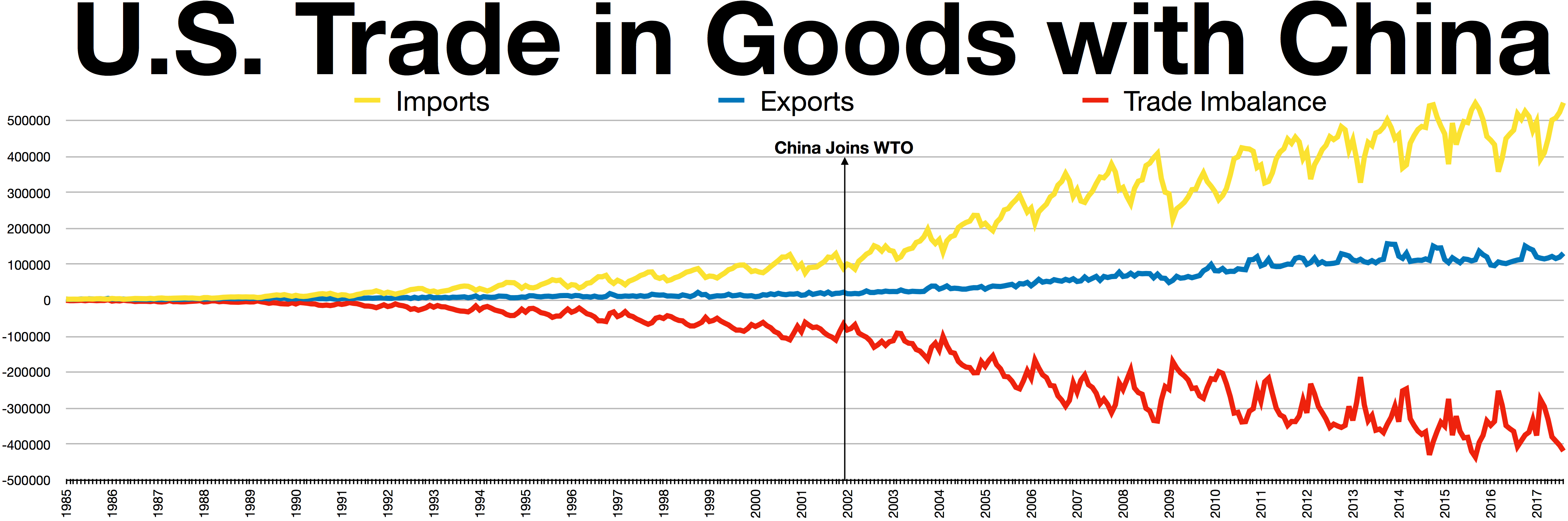
China USA trade with imports growing 5x after China's WTO integration

The push for China's integration into the global trading system began in earnest during the 1990s under U.S. President Bill Clinton, whose administration viewed commercial engagement culminating in China's 2001 accession to the World Trade Organization, as a way to open Chinese markets, encourage domestic reforms, and anchor Beijing within international institutions. This approach reflected the broader post–Cold War optimism of the decade, often associated with political scientist Francis Fukuyama's "end of history" thesis, which held that Western liberal democracy and free-market capitalism were emerging as the final, universal model of human governance. At the peak of this unipolar order, political scientists similarly observed in 1999 that "norms and rules of inter-state conduct have expanded in number and scope, in some cases becoming formalized in international law and institutions. As a result, international politics is becoming more orderly over time." They further pointed to the stabilizing effect of "a great power hierarchy which regulates international affairs to an extent," arguing that "the international system is most orderly when a single power or tightly bound group of powers is clearly predominant."

Office of the United States Trade Representative - Washington DC

Romano Prodi, Guy Verhofstadt, Zhu Rongji and Javier Solana at the podium during the final press conference 4th EU - China Summit press conference (2001)

Led by U.S. Trade Representative Charlene Barshefsky, American negotiators secured a landmark bilateral trade agreement with Chinese Premier Zhu Rongji in November 1999, which forced China to significantly lower its tariffs and trade barriers. To solidify this framework, the Clinton administration aggressively lobbied Congress to grant China Permanent Normal Trade Relations (PNTR) in 2000, effectively ending the contentious annual legislative reviews of Beijing’s human rights record and clearing the primary political obstacle to its entry. While the fundamental architecture and legal foundation were built under Clinton, the final diplomatic steps were executed by the incoming administration of President George W. Bush. In late 2001, the Bush administration certified that China had met its final multilateral commitments, allowing the country to formally join the World Trade Organization (WTO) on December 11, 2001. This transition marked a rare moment of bipartisan and cross-administration continuity, driven by a shared belief that anchoring Beijing to global economic rules would liberalize its economy, benefit American consumers, and foster a more collaborative international relationship.

==== 9/11 and George W. Bush administration ====
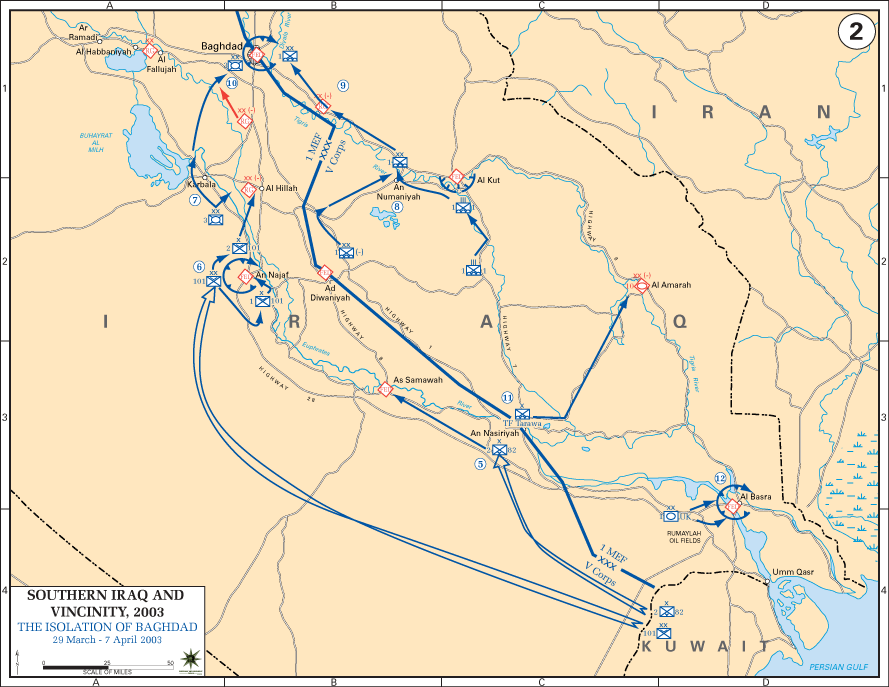
Iraq War Southern Front (2003)

The United States, having become the only global superpower, used that ideological victory to reinforce its leadership position in the new world order, proclaiming that "the United States and its allies are on the right side of history." This was referred to as "liberal hegemony" in international relations theory. Using the peace dividend, the United States Armed Forces were able to cut much of its expenditure, but the level rose again to comparable heights after the September 11 attacks and the initiation of the war on terror in 2001. The war on terror formed a major part of the foreign policy of every administration since it began. Like the war on drugs, the war on terror ebbs and flows, spiking at times such as the 2009 Fort Hood shooting.

US Marines and Army SF secure landing for MEDEVAC at Camp Blessing Afghanistan (2004)

President George W. Bush delivers his inaugural address during the 2005 Presidential Inauguration

Following 9/11, the Bush administration drastically transformed the nation’s domestic security apparatus through the creation of the Department of Homeland Security (DHS) and the integration of a consolidated terrorist watchlist. Rather than executing successful foreign-directed operations on American soil, extremist networks pivoted toward recruiting citizens and launching decentralized plans. Law enforcement interdicted at least ten serious al-Qaeda plots and dozens of localized homegrown conspiracies. Federal agencies successfully intercepted major plots, including the 2002 West Coast Airliner plot to target the tallest skyscraper in Los Angeles, a conspiracy to bomb fuel tanks at JFK International Airport, and a plan to use grenades to attack a Chicago-area shopping mall. Additionally, the era saw the rise of small, radicalized domestic groups plotting against military and symbolic structures most notably exemplified by the cell that targeted the Fort Dix Army Base in New Jersey and the conspirators who plotted to destroy the Sears Tower in Chicago. These aggressive counterterrorism measures secured the U.S. homeland from a successful second strike during Bush's tenure, but the proliferation of these intercepted cells proved that the domestic landscape had permanently changed into a frontline of the broader conflict.

With a vast nation to defend, we can neither predict nor prevent every conceivable attack. And in a free and open society, no Department of Government can completely guarantee our safety against ruthless killers who move and plot in shadows. Yet our Government will take every possible measure to safeguard our country and our people. We're fighting a new kind of war against determined enemies. And public servants long into the future will bear the responsibility to defend Americans against terror.

— George W. Bush, Address at the Department of Homeland Security Commissioning Ceremony (2003)

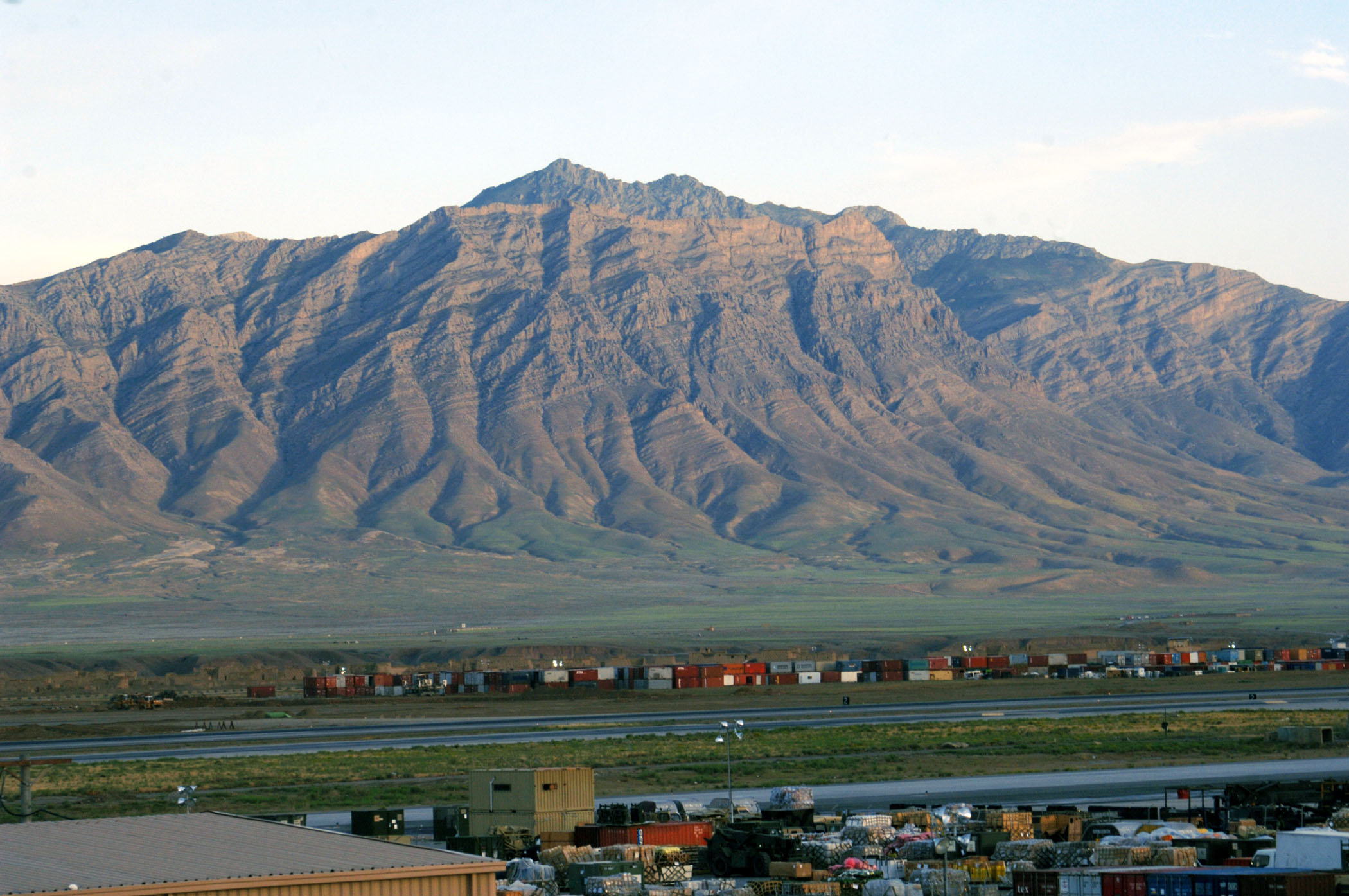
Bagram Airfield from the Air Traffic Control Tower's catwalk 3

==== Post 9/11 search for bin Laden ====
Striker vehicles pass through the Dab Pass in a mountainous region of Afghanistan

The pursuit of Osama bin Laden began with a critical near-miss during the Bush administration in December 2001, when U.S. and allied forces cornered the Al-Qaeda leader in the rugged Tora Bora mountain region of Afghanistan. Despite intense bombardment, reliance on local tribal militias and a shortage of American ground troops allowed bin Laden to slip across the border into Pakistan's tribal areas. Following this escape, the Bush administration shifted its primary military focus to the Iraq War, causing the hunt for bin Laden to transition into a protracted, clandestine intelligence operation. For the remainder of President George W. Bush’s tenure, the CIA and partner networks meticulously pieced together communication fragments, eventually identifying a trusted Al-Qaeda courier known as Abu Ahmed al-Kuwaiti, who would inadvertently provide the key to locating the fugitive leader.

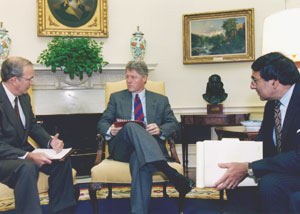
President Bill Clinton with Anthony Lake and Leon Panetta (CIA director in charge of the SEAL team operation)

The breakthrough in the decade-long manhunt occurred under the Obama administration, which renewed the operational priority of capturing or killing bin Laden. In 2010, intelligence analysts tracked the courier to a heavily fortified, million-dollar compound in Abbottabad, Pakistan, located less than a mile from a prominent Pakistani military academy. After months of high-stakes surveillance to confirm the high-value target's presence, President Barack Obama authorized a high-risk, covert cross-border raid. On May 2, 2011, a specialized team of U.S. Navy SEALs executed a midnight assault on the compound, resulting in the death of Osama bin Laden and ending an multi-billion dollar intelligence pursuit that spanned two presidential administrations.

GIs in Kandahar watch President Obama announce the killing of Osama bin Laden

==== Arab Spring and Obama administration response ====
A map of Arab Spring countries updated and reframed to reflect the independence of South Sudan on 9 July 2011: Government overthrown Forced gov. changes Minor counter-protests Armed riots Large urban protests Minor protests Protests in non-Arab countries

Adapted for country specific purposes once it spread, the initial event of the Arab Spring is often cited as the self immolation of Mohamed Bouazizi, Bouazizi a unlicensed street vendor in Tunisia in 2010 had his cart and goods seized by local law enforcement for noncompliance. The desperate vendor chose to set himself on fire in front of a local municipal building in Sidi Bouzid on 17 December 2010. After he passed away a few weeks later it sparked protests and the Tunisian president resigned and left the country. Soon after, a wave of revolution spread across Arab and North African states in the early 2010s. The conflicts were complex and sometimes regional, many extending years.

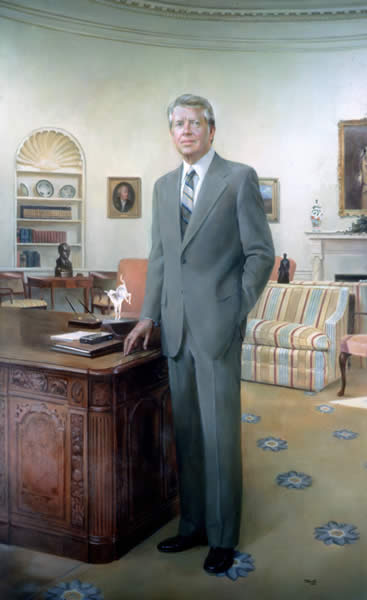
President Carter National Portrait Gallery

Former US president Jimmy Carter's Carter Center became involved in organizing the independence referendum and elections in South Sudan during the crisis. Following the 2011 Arab Spring protests, peaceful demonstrations in Syria quickly spiraled into a brutal civil war, creating a massive power vacuum across the region. Exploiting the collapse of state authority in Syria alongside deep sectarian divisions and political instability in neighboring Iraq, a militant offshoot of al-Qaeda, which emerged as the Islamic State of Iraq and Syria (ISIS) rapidly gained strength. In 2014, ISIS launched a sweeping offensive that captured vast territory across both countries, including the major Iraqi city of Mosul, and declared a self-styled "caliphate." This sudden territorial expansion forced the Obama administration to pivot back toward military intervention in the Middle East, forming an international coalition to conduct airstrikes and support local ground forces in a multi-year campaign to dismantle the group's strongholds. Crucially, the deadliest conflict, the Syrian Civil War, came to an end with the fall of the Assad government in 2024 Ultimately, leaders were overthrown from Tunisia, Egypt, Libya, Yemen, and Syria during the era.

U.S. Policy on the Arab Spring

"The people of the Middle East and North Africa are casting off the burdens of the past... It will be the policy of the United States to promote reform across the region, and to support transitions to democracy."

— Barack Obama

==== Annexation of Crimea and Obama administration response ====
Putin meeting of Crimea and Sevastopol

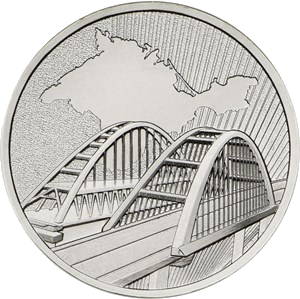
A 5-ruble steel coin dedicated to the fifth anniversary of the referendum on the state status of Crimea and Sevastopol and the reunification of Crimea with Russia, issued in 2019 the design shows the Kerch Bridge

Following the removal of pro-Russian Ukrainian president Viktor Yanukovych, on February 22, 2014, Russian forces surrounded Ukrainian military bases and seized the Crimean parliament building in Simferopol. A referendum was organized for March 16, 2014, despite widespread international condemnation and a boycott by the indigenous Crimean Tatar population, local authorities claimed a 97% vote in favor of integration. Two days later, on March 18, 2014, Putin signed the treaty of accession in the Kremlin alongside Crimean leaders, formalizing the first major annexation of European territory by a major power since World War II.

Putin said, "Everything in Crimea speaks of our shared history and pride. This is the location of ancient Khersones, where Prince Vladimir was baptised. His spiritual feat of adopting Orthodoxy predetermined the overall basis of the culture, civilisation and human values that unite the peoples of Russia, Ukraine and Belarus. The graves of Russian soldiers whose bravery brought Crimea into the Russian empire are also in Crimea. This is also Sevastopol – a legendary city with an outstanding history, a fortress that serves as the birthplace of Russia’s Black Sea Fleet. Crimea is Balaklava and Kerch, Malakhov Kurgan and Sapun Ridge. Each one of these places is dear to our hearts, symbolizing Russian military glory and outstanding valor." At the time, the Obama administration attempted to negotiate withdrawal of the Russian troops but failed. Scholars cite this as part of a broader pattern in the Obama administration to have misjudged the expansionist aims of the Putin-regime. However, the campaign of sanctions against Russia began at this time, with president Obama issuing Executive Order 13660. Obama said, “The referendum in Crimea was in clear violation of Ukrainian and international law, and will not be recognized by the international community. We have been guided by a fundamental principle: The future of Ukraine must be decided by the people of Ukraine."

==== First Trump administration ====
During the first Trump administration the foreign policy was broadly described as "America first". The administration prioritized actions against ISIS in Iraq and Syria. The campaign of sanctions continued with the Countering America's Adversaries Through Sanctions Act (CAATSA). A key foreign policy moment came with the ratification of the USMCA agreement, replacing NAFTA.

Starting from the 2020s onward, the perceived threat of global terrorism in the post-9/11 era has expanded beyond Middle Eastern jihadist groups, culminating in the United States and Canada designating several drug cartels and transnational criminal organizations as terrorist organizations in the context of narcoterrorism and the war on drugs.

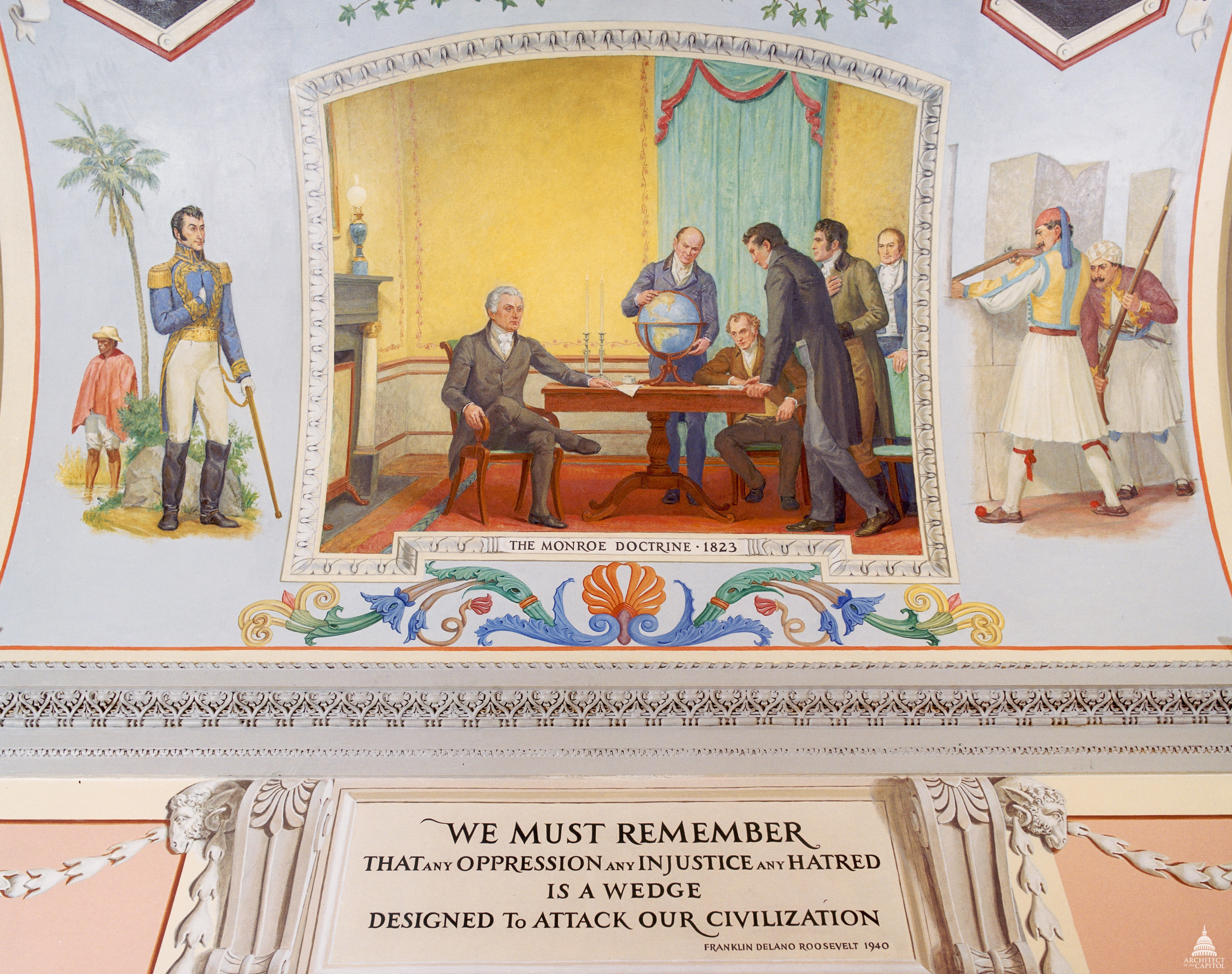
1823 Monroe Doctrine

The era also found the Monroe Doctrine once again playing a central role in US foreign policy. The 200 year old doctrine has had different effects depending on the era in which it was employed but its central theme has stayed the same: to maintain US hegemony in trade routes, trade deals, security, and access in the Western Hemisphere.

===== Brexit =====
Following the ratification of the Maastricht Treaty on 1 November 1993, the UK declined to adopt the Euro currency (retaining the Pound Sterling) and later negotiated exemptions from the Schengen passport-free travel area, establishing a precedent of "two-speed" integration in which Britain embraced frictionless trade while resisting supranational governance. By the mid-2010s, structural pressures fueled domestic discontent and catalyzed a broader wave of deglobalization across Western democracies. Following the 2008 global financial crisis, the Eurozone sovereign debt crisis, and the 2015 European migrant crisis, British voters grew increasingly concerned over perceived losses of national sovereignty, the supremacy of European Court of Justice rulings over UK law, and high levels of intra-EU immigration resulting from the bloc's 2004 eastward expansion. Responding to mounting pressure from Eurosceptic factions, Prime Minister David Cameron held an in-out referendum on 23 June 2016, in which 51.9% of the electorate voted to leave the European Union, triggering the formal invocation of Article 50 of the Treaty on European Union on 29 March 2017.

HM Revenue and Customs lit in red, white and blue on Brexit Day

In Washington, the first Trump administration publicly praised Brexit as a reclamation of national self-determination, broke with long-standing U.S. diplomatic precedent that had favored a unified European bloc, and pledged to negotiate a bilateral U.S.–UK free trade agreement to offset London's impending separation from Brussels. This transatlantic alignment reinforced a shifting geopolitical climate in which bilateral transactionalism increasingly challenged post–Cold War multilateralism. Following years of parliamentary deadlock and three extensions of the negotiating window, the United Kingdom formally withdrew from the European Union on 31 January 2020 at 23:00 GMT, entering an 11-month transition period that concluded with the implementation of the EU–UK Trade and Cooperation Agreement on 1 January 2021. By erecting new regulatory and customs barriers between two major advanced economies, Brexit dismantled decades of frictionless economic convergence and reasserted national borders over supranational governance. Ultimately, the UK's exit stood as the first major reversal of post–Cold War regional integration, signaling a durable pivot toward fragmentation and economic nationalism in the international order.

===== Denuclearization efforts =====
As a lingering remnant of the early Cold War conflict on the Korean Peninsula, the armistice agreement of which was signed on 27 July 1953, North Korea’s contemporary nuclear program traces its roots back to post-Korean War security anxieties, evolving into a volatile, multi-decade standoff with the international community. The crisis escalated sharply between 1991 and 1994 when the withdrawal of U.S. tactical nuclear weapons from South Korea led to a brief denuclearization agreement, which quickly collapsed over hidden plutonium processing and prompted the 1994 U.S.-North Korea Agreed Framework to temporarily freeze Pyongyang's reactors. This freeze unraveled completely in 2002 after the exposure of a secret North Korean uranium-enrichment program, causing the regime to expel international inspectors and withdraw from the Nuclear Non-Proliferation Treaty.

Closeup of the Korean Demilitarized Zone that surrounds the Military Demarcation Line

Despite intermittent diplomatic efforts during the Six-Party Talks from 2003 to 2007, North Korea fundamentally altered the regional security landscape by conducting its first underground nuclear explosive test in October 2006, followed by a second test in 2009. Under Kim Jong Un's leadership, the program accelerated aggressively, yielding increasingly powerful nuclear tests in 2013 and 2016, and culminating in a massive sixth thermonuclear detonation in September 2017 alongside successful flight tests of intercontinental ballistic missiles capable of reaching the American mainland. Although high-profile summit diplomacy between 2018 and 2019 brought a temporary pause in long-range testing, negotiations ultimately stalled over sanctions relief and denuclearization definitions. By 2021, North Korea formally codified a new defense plan focusing on tactical nuclear deployment, subsequently amending its constitution to enshrine its status as an irreversible, de facto nuclear-armed state aggressively modernizing its solid-fuel missiles and exponentially expanding its fissile material production into the mid-2020s.

===== Middle East =====
Upon taking office on 20 January 2017, the first Trump administration inherited the 16-year War in Afghanistan amid a worsening security stalemate, with approximately 8,400 U.S. troops deployed in a train-and-assist capacity alongside NATO Resolute Support forces. Pentagon leadership unveiled a conditions-based South Asia Strategy on 21 August 2017, authorizing a modest troop surge to roughly 14,000 personnel while lifting Obama-era rules of engagement to intensify airstrikes against Taliban insurgents. By September 2018, however, recognizing that military pressure had failed to break the deadlock, the administration appointed Ambassador Zalmay Khalilzad as Special Representative for Afghanistan Reconciliation to open direct bilateral negotiations with the Taliban in Doha, Qatar. Following more than a year of fitful negotiations including a September 2019 breakdown after a Taliban car bombing in Kabul killed a U.S. soldier, Washington and the insurgency signed the Agreement for Bringing Peace to Afghanistan (the Doha Agreement) on 29 February 2020. Under the binding terms of the accord, the United States committed to reducing its force posture to 8,600 troops within 135 days and executing a full withdrawal of all U.S. and coalition forces within 14 months (by 1 May 2021), contingent upon Taliban counterterrorism guarantees to prevent al-Qaeda from operating on Afghan soil and the launch of intra-Afghan peace talks. Three days later, on 3 March 2020, Trump held a historic 35-minute telephone conversation with Taliban co-founder and chief negotiator Mullah Abdul Ghani Baradar the first direct exchange between a U.S. president and a senior Taliban leader during which Trump pressed Baradar on curbing violence and later recounted issuing a blunt warning that the Taliban would face severe military retaliation if any American personnel were harmed during the drawdown.

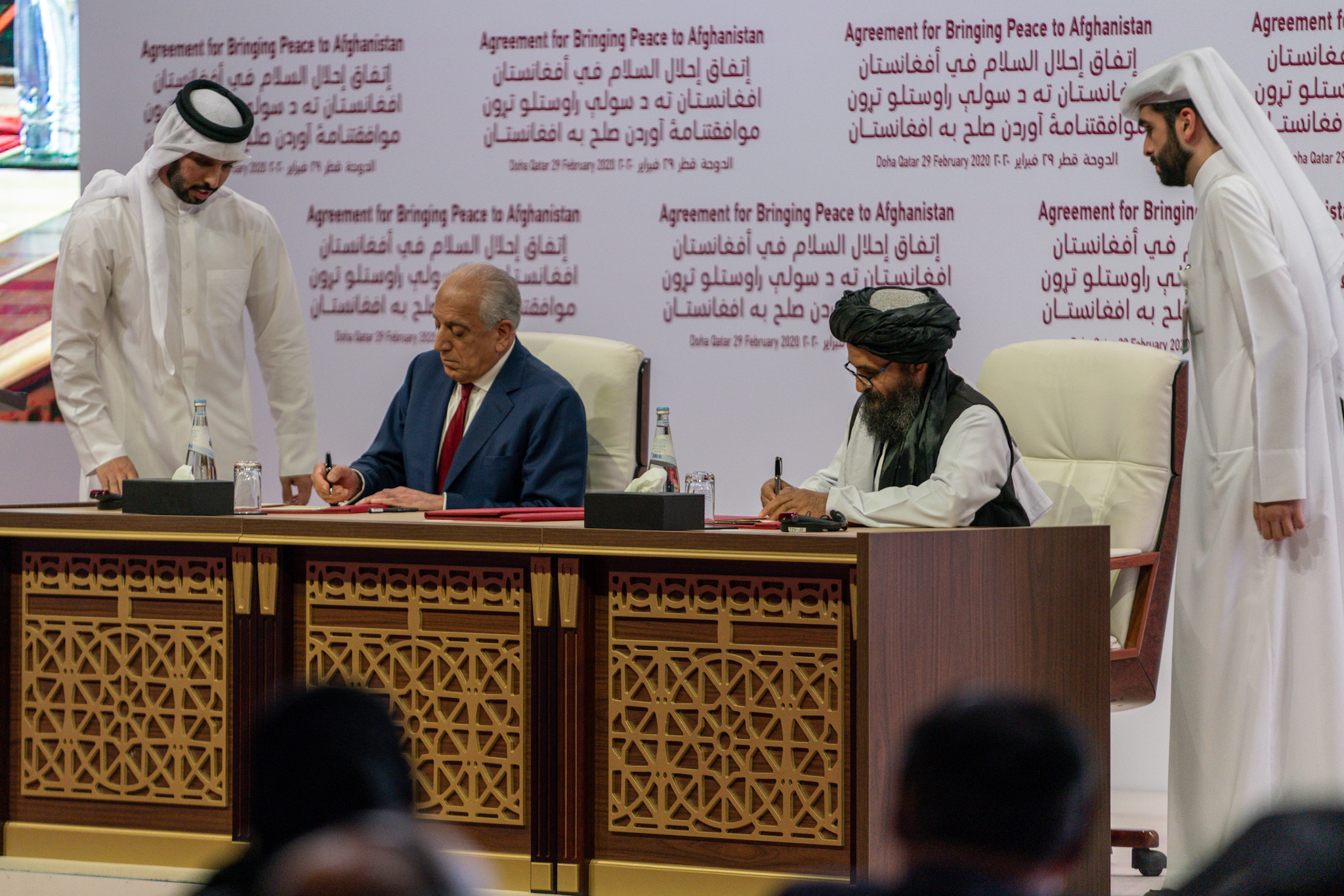
US representative Zalmay Khalilzad (left) and Taliban representative Abdul Ghani Baradar (right) sign the agreement in Doha, Qatar on February 29, 2020

Despite persistent Taliban attacks against Afghan National Defense and Security Forces (ANDSF) and stalled intra-Afghan negotiations in Doha, the Trump administration accelerated its unilateral troop drawdown throughout the remainder of 2020. Following the U.S.-brokered release of 5,000 Taliban prisoners by Kabul, Pentagon leadership confirmed on 18 June 2020 that American forces had reached the 8,600 threshold ahead of schedule, before trimming levels further to 4,500 by autumn. On 17 November 2020, Acting Secretary of Defense Christopher Miller formally announced an additional directive to cut U.S. troop strength to 2,500 by 15 January 2021, reducing the American military footprint in Afghanistan to its lowest level since 2001. By the time the conflict was handed off to the incoming Biden administration on 20 January 2021, the U.S. posture in Afghanistan had been structurally transformed from an open-ended counterinsurgency campaign into a narrowly circumscribed exit timeline. With only 2,500 American personnel remaining on the ground, critical air support and contractor maintenance withdrawn from Afghan forces, and a binding 1 May 2021 departure deadline looming under the Doha Agreement, the incoming Biden administration faced a binary choice: honor the negotiated withdrawal schedule or re-escalate U.S. troop deployments into an active war against a resurgent Taliban. Ultimately, the Doha framework and rapid 2020 drawdown locked in the end of America's longest war, marking a decisive retreat from post–9/11 nation-building as Washington pivoted its strategic focus toward Great Power competition.

==== Middle East and Biden administration response ====
Following an internal policy review, President Joe Biden announced on 14 April 2021 that the United States would honor the core framework of the Doha Agreement by executing a full, unconditional withdrawal of remaining American forces, extending the departure deadline slightly from 1 May to 11 September 2021 (later accelerated to 31 August 2021). As U.S. troops vacated key installationsincluding the quiet overnight handover of Bagram Airfield on 2 July 2021 the Taliban launched a rapid, district-by-district offensive across rural provinces. Deprived of American air support, intelligence, and contractor logistics, the Afghan National Defense and Security Forces suffered cascading morale collapses and negotiated surrenders, culminating in the fall of Kabul and the flight of President Ashraf Ghani on 15 August 2021. The sudden collapse forced Washington to pivot from an orderly drawdown to an emergency non-combatant evacuation operation, Operation Allies Refuge, deploying roughly 6,000 U.S. troops back into Kabul to secure Hamid Karzai International Airport. Because the Taliban controlled the outer perimeter of the capital, American forces were placed in the untenable operational position of relying on Taliban checkpoints to manage crowd flow outside the airport gates while tens of thousands of desperate Afghan allies and foreign nationals pressed against the perimeter. Amid acute, credible intelligence warnings of an imminent terrorist attack, a suicide bomber affiliated with the Islamic State–Khorasan Province (ISIS–K) detonated an explosive vest packed with ball bearings in the crowded canal outside Abbey Gate on 26 August 2021. The blast killed approximately 170 Afghan civilians and 13 U.S. service members 11 Marines, one Soldier, and one Navy Corpsman marking the single deadliest day for American forces in Afghanistan in a decade. Four days later, on 30 August 2021 (just before midnight Kabul time), the final U.S. C-17 transport lifted off from the tarmac, concluding an airlift of more than 124,000 people and formally ending nearly 20 years of American military presence.

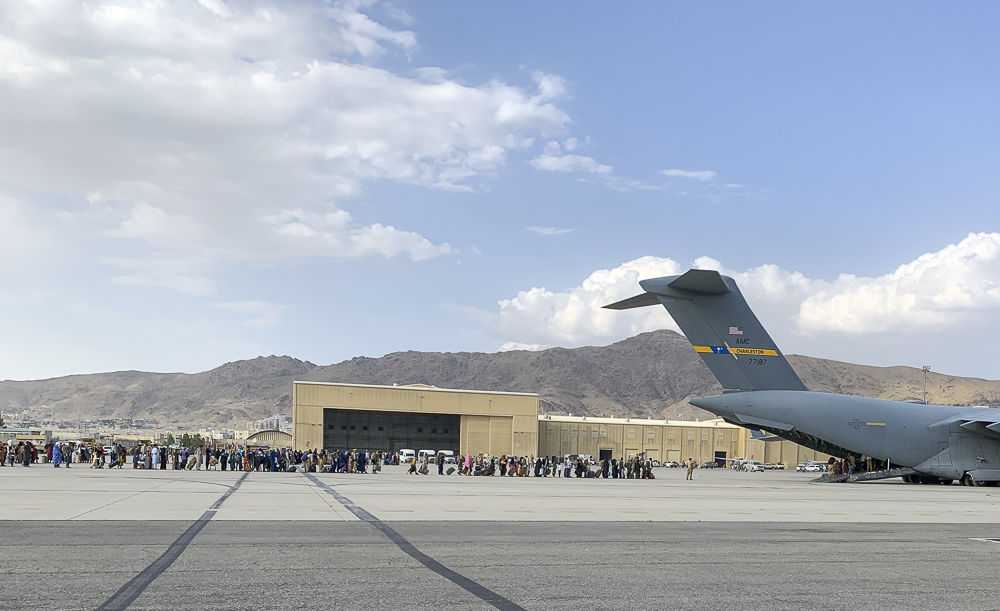
Paratroopers from XVIII Airborne Corp continue to support the Non-combatant Evacuation (NEO) mission in Afghanistan, August 21, 2021

The War in Afghanistan spanned 19 years, 10 months, and 23 days (from 7 October 2001 to 30 August 2021), making it the longest armed conflict in United States history. According to Department of Defense tallies, 2,459 to 2,465 U.S. military personnel died in support of the war (including over 1,920 killed in hostile action), while 20,769 service members were wounded in action. Alongside American losses, the conflict claimed the lives of roughly 1,144 allied NATO and coalition troops, more than 3,800 U.S. contractors, over 69,000 Afghan national military and police personnel, and tens of thousands of Afghan civilians, while costing the U.S. treasury more than $2 trillion. Historians now debate the comparisons of the chaotic rooftop helicopter evacuations from the U.S. Embassy in Kabul on 15 August 2021 and the 30 April 1975 Fall of Saigon at the end of the Vietnam War.

==== Invasion of Ukraine and Biden administration response ====
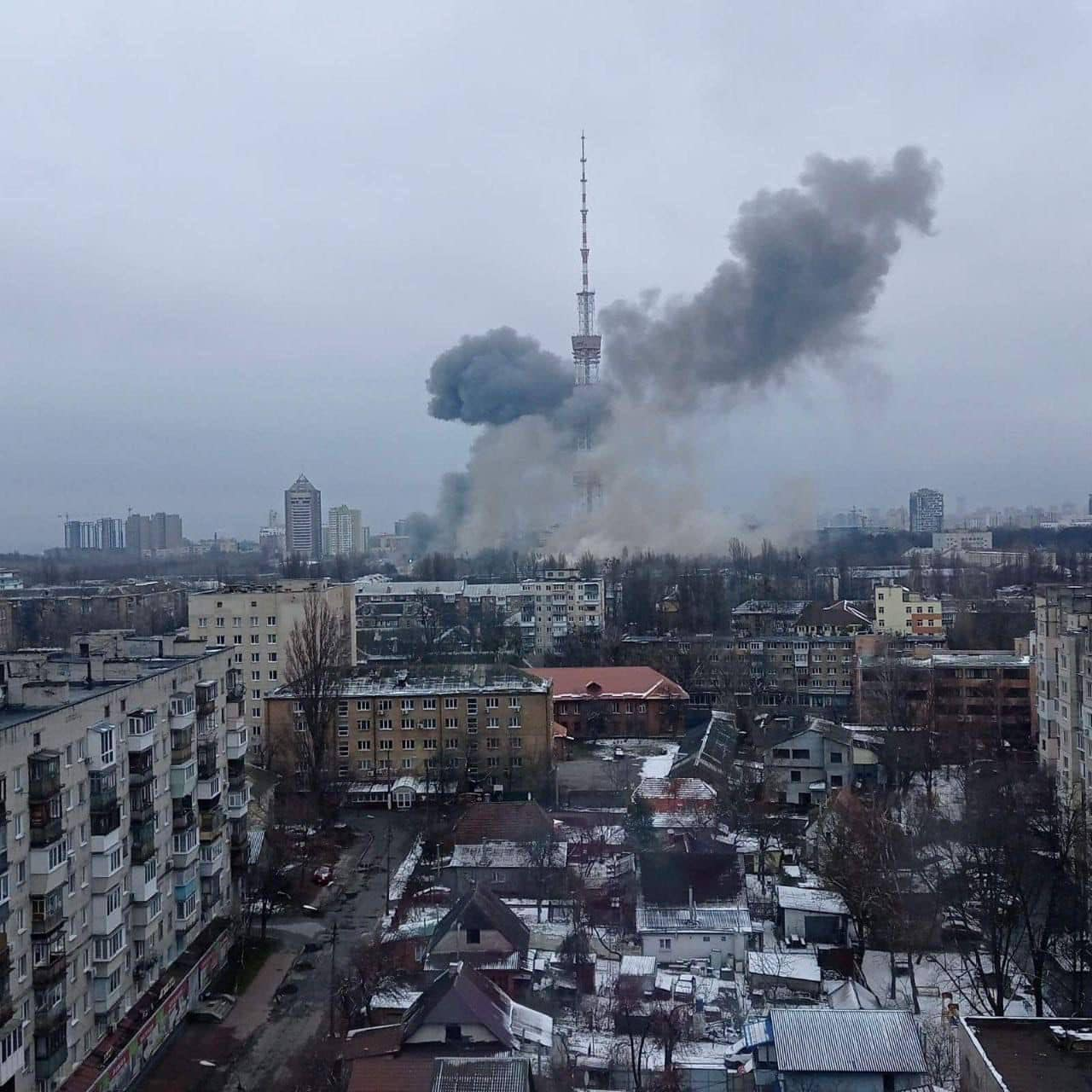
Russian bombardment of telecommunications antennas in Kyiv

In July 2021 the Putin-regime published a document asserting that Russians and Ukrainians were "one people" and that modern Ukraine occupied historically Russian lands. Starting in October 2021, Putin authorized a massive military buildup along Ukraine's borders. The following month CIA Director William Burns made a rare trip to Moscow and met with Putin and security chief Nikolai Patrushev. At this time the Biden administration began its intelligence declassification strategy to inform NATO allies and the public on satellite imagery, troop counts, and specific Russian military axes. In December 2021, The Kremlin issued a formal list of "security guarantees" or ultimatums to the West including a legally binding guarantee that NATO will never admit Ukraine and that the alliance withdraw all military infrastructure from countries that joined after 1997. The U.S. and NATO rejected the demands as non-starters in meetings held in January 2022 in Geneva, Brussels, and Vienna. The talks completely stalled as Russia refused to withdraw its troops and the West refused to compromise on NATO's "Open Door" policy. In February 2022, The Russian buildup reached an estimated 150,000 to 190,000 personnel surrounding Ukraine on three sides (Russia, Belarus, and occupied Crimea). Naval forces, including amphibious landing ships, mass in the Black Sea. Later in February in a televised address, Putin formally recognized the independence of the two Russian-backed breakaway territories in eastern Ukraine (the Donetsk and Luhansk "People's Republics") and immediately ordered Russian "peacekeeping" forces to cross into the Donbas.

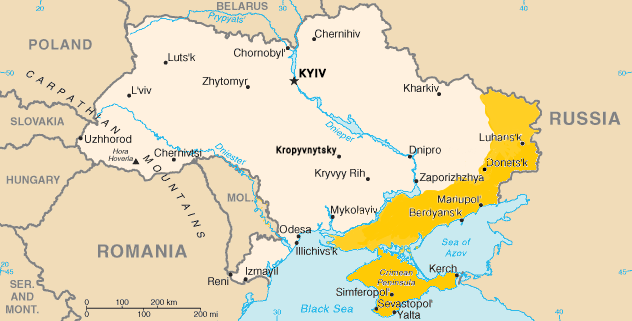
Ukraine map (disputed territory)

On February 24, 2022 Putin delivered an unannounced address declaring a "Special Military Operation" to "demilitarize and denazify" Ukraine. Within minutes, cruise and ballistic missiles begin striking Kyiv, Kharkiv, and Odesa, and Russian ground forces cross the borders. Biden said, "Liberty, democracy, human dignity these are the forces far more powerful than fear and oppression. They cannot be extinguished by tyrants like Putin and his armies. They cannot be erased by people from people’s hearts and hopes by any amount of violence and intimidation.They endure."

In the weeks immediately following the invasion, Ukrainian forces mounted a fierce defense that thwarted Russia’s rapid push toward the capital. Russian airborne troops attempting to capture Antonov Airport near Kyiv were repelled, and a 40-mile armored convoy advancing from Belarus stalled due to logistical failures and relentless Ukrainian ambushes. By early April 2022, Moscow withdrew its battered forces from northern Ukraine to refocus its offensive on the eastern Donbas region. Meanwhile, in the south, Russian troops captured the city of Kherson and laid a devastating three-month siege to the port city of Mariupol, which finally fell in May after the last Ukrainian defenders at the Azovstal steel plant surrendered. As Western nations imposed sweeping economic sanctions and began supplying Kyiv with advanced weaponry, Ukrainian President Volodymyr Zelenskyy rallied international support, famously declaring, "The fight is here; I need ammunition, not a ride."

Armed with newly arrived Western artillery and HIMARS rocket systems, Ukraine shifted from defense to offense in the late summer of 2022. In September, Ukrainian forces executed a lightning counteroffensive in the northeastern Kharkiv region, routing Russian troops and recapturing thousands of square kilometers of territory in just days. Two months later, sustained pressure forced Russia to abandon Kherson, the only regional capital it had captured since February. Facing mounting battlefield setbacks, Putin ordered a partial military mobilization of 300,000 reservists and illegally proclaimed the annexation of four Ukrainian regions Donetsk, Luhansk, Zaporizhzhia, and Kherson even though Moscow did not fully control any of them. Over the winter, Russia launched massive missile and drone barrages targeting Ukraine’s power grid, plunging millions of civilians into darkness and freezing temperatures.

Map of battles in the Kursk region

By 2023, the conflict had settled into a brutal war of attrition marked by World War I-style trench warfare across a 600-mile front line. In May 2023, Russian forces spearheaded by the Wagner Group mercenary army captured the ruined eastern city of Bakhmut after months of grueling street-by-street fighting that cost tens of thousands of lives. Ukraine launched a heavily anticipated summer counteroffensive in the south aimed at severing Russia's land bridge to Crimea, but dense minefields and heavily fortified defensive lines stalled the advance. In June 2023, Wagner chief Yevgeny Prigozhin staged a brief, aborted armed mutiny against Russia's military leadership before dying in a mysterious plane crash two months later. Entering 2024, as U.S. military aid faced months of congressional delays, Russia regained the battlefield initiative and captured the strategic fortress town of Avdiivka, while Ukraine stunned Moscow in August 2024 by launching a surprise cross-border incursion into Russia's Kursk region the largest foreign invasion of Russian territory since World War II.

==== Foreign policy of the second Trump administration ====
===== Russo-Ukranian War =====
In late 2024, Moscow responded to the Kursk incursion by deploying roughly 14,000 to 15,000 North Korean troops alongside Russian forces while maintaining relentless, attritional offensives across eastern Ukraine. Simultaneously, the conflict's diplomatic trajectory shifted dramatically in Washington: following Donald Trump’s victory in the November 2024 presidential election, amid quiet transition-era coordination with the departing Biden administration to prevent a sudden collapse of Kyiv’s front lines, the incoming president vowed to bring a swift end to the war, tapping his former 2016 primary rival, Senator Marco Rubio, to serve as Secretary of State. Through 2025, the war settled into a brutal grind alongside high-stakes diplomatic maneuvering. Confirmed unanimously in January 2025, Rubio joined special envoy Steve Witkoff in opening direct backchannels with Moscow, culminating in a summit on August 15, 2025, Putin's first visit to U.S. soil in a decade. As prospects of a U.S. pullback grew in early 2025, Britain and France spearheaded the creation of the 37-nation Coalition of the Willing in March 2025 to sustain long-term backing for Kyiv and plan a post-ceasefire reassurance force. Fighting raged on the ground and Kyiv answered with covert sabotage including a June 2025 underwater explosive attack on the Crimean Bridge's support pillars. By late 2025, Russian forces pushed into the Donetsk logistical hub of Kostiantynivka and pressed heavily against Pokrovsk and Myrnohrad, while Kyiv expanded its domestic weapons production and struck deep into Russia's energy sector. In early 2026, the front lines briefly shifted when Ukrainian forces mounted a counterattack in Zaporizhzhia province in February, regaining roughly 100 square miles of territory, the first net territorial gain since 2023. That January, leaders from Britain, France, and Ukraine signed a declaration of intent establishing the Multinational Force-Ukraine (MNF-U), the coalition's military arm designed to help regenerate Ukrainian forces and deter future aggression once hostilities cease.

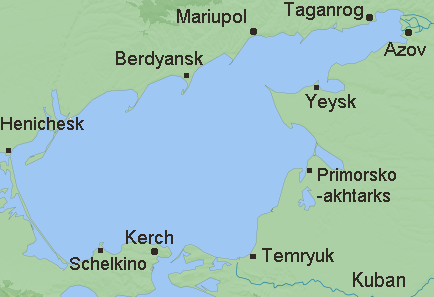
Population centers on the Sea of Azov

Throughout the spring and summer of 2026, Kyiv intensified its deep-strike campaign, halting roughly 40% of Russia's western oil export capacity, devastating shipping in the Sea of Azov, and systematically dismantling Russian air defenses along the southern coast, even as Rubio shuttled from ASEAN talks in Manila to Central Asia in search of an elusive diplomatic middle ground. Meanwhile, coalition members worked to build out the MNF-U framework and align financial and defense commitments alongside European partners. By November 2026, diplomacy, coalition mobilization, and warfare collided in a dramatic climax. American envoys scrambled to lock in a settlement convening U.S.-mediated talks in Abu Dhabi and Berlin while Trump met face-to-face with Putin in China on the sidelines of the APEC summit. In southeastern Poland, troops from 11 countries began a two-week MNF-U field exercise at Nowa Dęba on November 9 to test post-ceasefire deployment plans, followed on November 19 by a Coalition of the Willing summit in Berlin with Ukrainian President Volodymyr Zelenskyy, European leaders, and U.S. envoys Witkoff and Jared Kushner. Yet on the battlefield, after months of Russian strikes on Kyiv's bridges and energy infrastructure, Ukraine executed a multi-week operation that culminated in a massive, three-day barrage between November 16 and 19. Using domestically produced drones alongside cruise missiles Ukrainian forces collapsed a 270-meter central steel arch and roadway span of the Kerch Strait Bridge into the main shipping channel and repeatedly struck the adjacent railway.

===== Middle East =====
Iranian postage stamp from 1966 featuring Mohammad Reza Shah Pahlavi

When the Iranian Revolution ousted the Western-backed Shah, Mohammad Reza Pahlavi, establishing an anti-Western Islamic Republic under Ayatollah Ruhollah Khomeini and closing a centuries-long chapter of monarchical rule during the Cold War. President Jimmy Carter allowed the exiled, terminally ill Shah into the United States for cancer treatment in October 1979, before the monarch departed for Panama and ultimately died in exile in Egypt. Iranian students stormed the U.S. Embassy in Tehran on November 4, taking 52 Americans hostage for 444 days. The crisis paralyzed Carter’s presidency and reached a dramatic climax on January 20, 1981, when Iran formally released the captives just minutes after Ronald Reagan took the oath of office, enabling Reagan to announce their freedom during his inaugural celebrations.

The map of the Axis of Resistance

Over the next four decades, particularly in the power vacuums created by the 2001 and 2003 U.S. invasions of Afghanistan and Iraq during the War on Terror, Tehran expanded its regional reach by building an "Axis of Resistance" composed of heavily armed militant proxies. This network anchored by Hezbollah in Lebanon, Hamas in Gaza, and the Houthi movement in Yemen ignited a full-scale regional crisis on October 7, 2023, when Hamas launched a devastating terror attack on Israel from an extensive, Iranian-backed subterranean tunnel system. In solidarity with Hamas, Hezbollah’s longtime leader Hassan Nasrallah ordered relentless rocket barrages into northern Israel, while the Houthis began firing anti-ship missiles and drones at commercial vessels in the Red Sea. Israel shattered Hezbollah’s command structure in September 2024 through a covert operation that detonated thousands of rigged pagers and walkie-talkies carried by operatives, culminating days later in massive Beirut airstrikes that killed Nasrallah. Meanwhile, to keep global shipping lanes open in the Red Sea, the Biden administration deployed U.S. aircraft carriers and guided-missile destroyers into daily, high-intensity air defense battles under Operations Prosperity Guardian and Poseidon Archer.

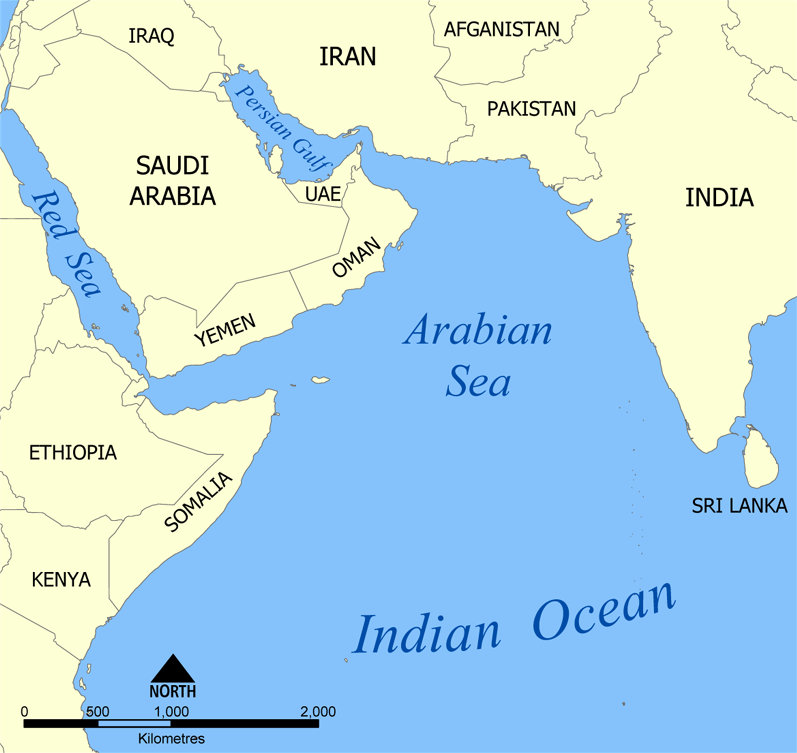
Arabian Sea map with Red Sea shown

Strait of Hormuz

Taking command of this stretched fleet in early 2025, President Trump quickly escalated pressure on Tehran after indirect nuclear negotiations collapsed and Iran restricted international inspectors from its hardened underground nuclear sites. In June 2025, when Iran denied access and pushed enrichment forward, Trump authorized direct military strikes under Operation Midnight Hammer. A formal naval blockade of Iranian ports was instituted in April 2026 and reimposing it in July after a brief truce collapsed. Maintaining regional deterrence in the form of the blockade has required a massive concentration of naval power in the Middle East, including 17 guided-missile destroyers, amphibious assault ships, and three aircraft carriers following the arrival of the USS Theodore Roosevelt.

===== Enhanced actions in the Western Hemisphere =====
Since President Richard Nixon formally declared drug abuse "public enemy number one" in 1971 and established the Drug Enforcement Administration (DEA) in 1973, the United States has waged a multi-decade, supply-focused campaign against illicit narcotics that has inadvertently reshaped organized crime across the Western Hemisphere. During the 1980s, the Reagan and George H.W. Bush administrations escalated militarized interdiction against powerful South American syndicates, most notably Colombia’s Medellín and Cali cartels led by figures like Pablo Escobar. This era featured aggressive Cold War entanglement and direct military intervention, culminating in the 1989 U.S. invasion of Panama to capture de facto ruler Manuel Noriega, a former CIA asset who had turned his country into a critical cocaine transshipment hub. However, dismantling Caribbean smuggling routes and fracturing Colombian cartels in the 1990s created a "balloon effect," shifting operational power north to Mexican trafficking organizations such as the Guadalajara, Sinaloa, and Gulf cartels which evolved from mere transport contractors into dominant, heavily armed multinational enterprises.

The tunnel in El Chapo's second escape

Under the Clinton, George W. Bush, and Obama administrations, U.S. strategy leaned heavily on bilateral security pacts like Plan Colombia and the Mérida Initiative, prioritizing a "kingpin strategy" aimed at capturing or killing top cartel leadership. While these efforts took down major figures, they repeatedly triggered violent succession wars and cartel fragmentation, birthing hyper-violent splinter groups like Los Zetas and the Cartel de Jalisco Nueva Generación (CJNG). To bypass hardened border checkpoints established after 9/11, cartels deployed immense engineering resources, constructing hundreds of sophisticated, ventilated, and rail-equipped cross-border "narco-tunnels" (Note: Narco tunnels found by decade, since the '90s: 1990s ~10–15 The modern era of narco-tunneling began in 1990 with the first major sophisticated tunnel linked to Joaquín "El Chapo" Guzmán in Douglas, Arizona. Tunnels emerged directly in response to stepped-up above-ground border fencing. 2000s ~100–115 Discoveries surged sharply after 2006 following increased border enforcement. Authorities formed the multi-agency San Diego Tunnel Task Force in 2003 to target sophisticated passages. 2010s ~100+ Total cumulative discoveries rose from 154 in mid-2011 to roughly 230 by early 2019. Tunnels became deeper and longer, culminating in the August 2019 discovery of a record-breaking 4,309-foot passage in San Diego. 2020s (through 2026) ~20+ Discoveries spiked in 2020 with 11 tunnels found during border wall expansions. Major high-tech passages continued to be uncovered in the Otay Mesa area in May 2022 and June 2026. Source:) beneath Arizona and California. Corruption within foreign prison systems also plagued U.S.-backed enforcement, exemplified by Sinaloa Cartel boss Joaquín "El Chapo" Guzmán, who infamously escaped a Mexican maximum-security prison in 2015 via a mile-long subterranean tunnel fitted with a motorcycle on rails before his eventual recapture and extradition to the United States.

2025 United States–Drug Cartel Armed Conflict

In the past decade, the conflict shifted from plant-based drugs like cocaine and heroin to synthetic opioids, primarily illicit fentanyl manufactured in Mexico using precursor chemicals sourced largely from China. During his first term, President Donald Trump emphasized border wall construction and designated cartels as top transnational threats, while the Biden administration focused on disrupting global chemical supply chains, expanding domestic harm reduction, and targeting money-laundering networks. Despite decades of arrests, extraditions, and billions in foreign security aid, cartel networks adapted by diversifying into human smuggling, extortion, and digital finance, while maintaining lucrative distribution partnerships with U.S.-based street and prison gangs. Upon returning to office in 2025, the second Trump administration initiated a dramatic doctrinal shift, reframing cartel activity from a law enforcement issue into an act of asymmetric warfare and national security. In early 2025 and expanding through 2026, the State Department formally designated major groups including the Sinaloa Cartel, CJNG, and Venezuela’s Tren de Aragua as Foreign Terrorist Organizations (FTOs), while an executive order classified illicit fentanyl and its precursors as Weapons of Mass Destruction. Replacing traditional Justice Department task forces with 59 interagency Homeland Security Task Force units and launching the 17-nation Americas Counter Cartel Coalition, the administration authorized expanded military border support, maritime strikes, and sweeping secondary financial sanctions to sever cartel territory and revenue. Critics and regional analysts warn that while FTO designations unlock aggressive counterterrorism authorities, they risk straining diplomatic ties with Mexico and complicating humanitarian aid in cartel-controlled regions without resolving underlying U.S. domestic demand.

Panama Canal and Canal Zone map

Broadening the lens beyond counternarcotics, historians and foreign policy scholars increasingly debate whether this aggressive hemispheric posture reflects a deliberate reactivation of the 1823 Monroe Doctrine long after former Secretary of State John Kerry infamously declared (Note: see Foreign policy of the Obama administration) its era over in 2013, triggered in large part by the expansion of China’s Belt and Road Initiative (BRI) across Latin America. Scholars arguing for this link point out that U.S. national security strategy in 2025 and 2026 explicitly fused anti-cartel operations with great-power competition, treating both Chinese-supplied fentanyl precursors and Beijing-backed infrastructure as interlocking threats to hemispheric hegemony. Recently diplomatic pressure on Panama prompted the Central American nation to exit the BRI in 2025 and culminated in a landmark January 2026 Panamanian Supreme Court ruling that invalidated long-standing port concessions held by Hong Kong-based CK Hutchison at both entrances of the Panama Canal. While some historians caution that contemporary U.S. policy differs from nineteenth-century imperialism by relying on economic statecraft, legal pressure, and regional security coalitions rather than formal colonization, others contend that linking maritime interdiction in the Caribbean, counter-cartel militarization, and the rollback of Chinese strategic assets along the canal marks an unmistakable return to unilateral U.S. sphere-of-influence politics in the Americas.

=== Government, economic, and military institutions ===
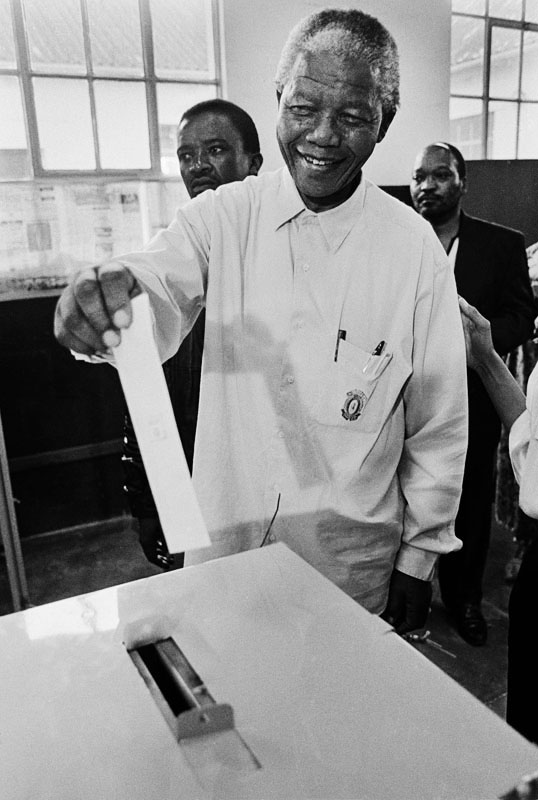
Nelson Mandela casting his vote in the 1994 South African elections

The end of the Cold War liberalized governments around the world, ending policies like apartheid, notably in South Africa. In 1990, Nelson Mandela was freed from prison and the regime began steps to end apartheid. This culminated in the first democratic elections in 1994, which resulted in Mandela being elected as President of South Africa.

Socialist and communist parties around the world saw drops in membership after the Berlin Wall fell, and the public felt that free-market ideology had won. Libertarian, neoliberal, nationalist and Islamist parties, on the other hand, benefited from the fall of the Soviet Union. As capitalism had "won," as people saw it, socialism and communism in general declined in popularity. Social democrats in Scandinavia privatized many of their institutions in the 1990s, and a political debate on modern economics was reopened. Scandinavian nations are often now seen as social democrat (see Nordic model). It has been posited by some scholars that the end of communism as a global force in the post–Cold War era allowed neoliberal capitalism to become the dominant global system, which has resulted in rising economic inequality.

World population living in extreme poverty, 1820-2015 (WB and Bourguignon and Morrisson (Absolute; 1820-2015)), OWID

The People's Republic of China, which had started to move towards capitalism in the late 1970s and faced public anger after the 1989 Tiananmen Square protests and massacre in Beijing, moved even more quickly towards free-market economics in the 1990s, framing this mixed economy as "socialism with Chinese characteristics". McDonald's and Pizza Hut both entered the country in the second half of 1990, the first American chains in China (aside from Kentucky Fried Chicken, which had entered in 1987). Stock markets were established in Shenzhen and Shanghai in late 1990 as well. Restrictions on car ownership were loosened in the early 1990s and caused the bicycle to decline as a form of transport by 2000. The move to capitalism has increased the economic prosperity of China, but many people still live in poor conditions and work for companies for very low wages and in dangerous and poor conditions.

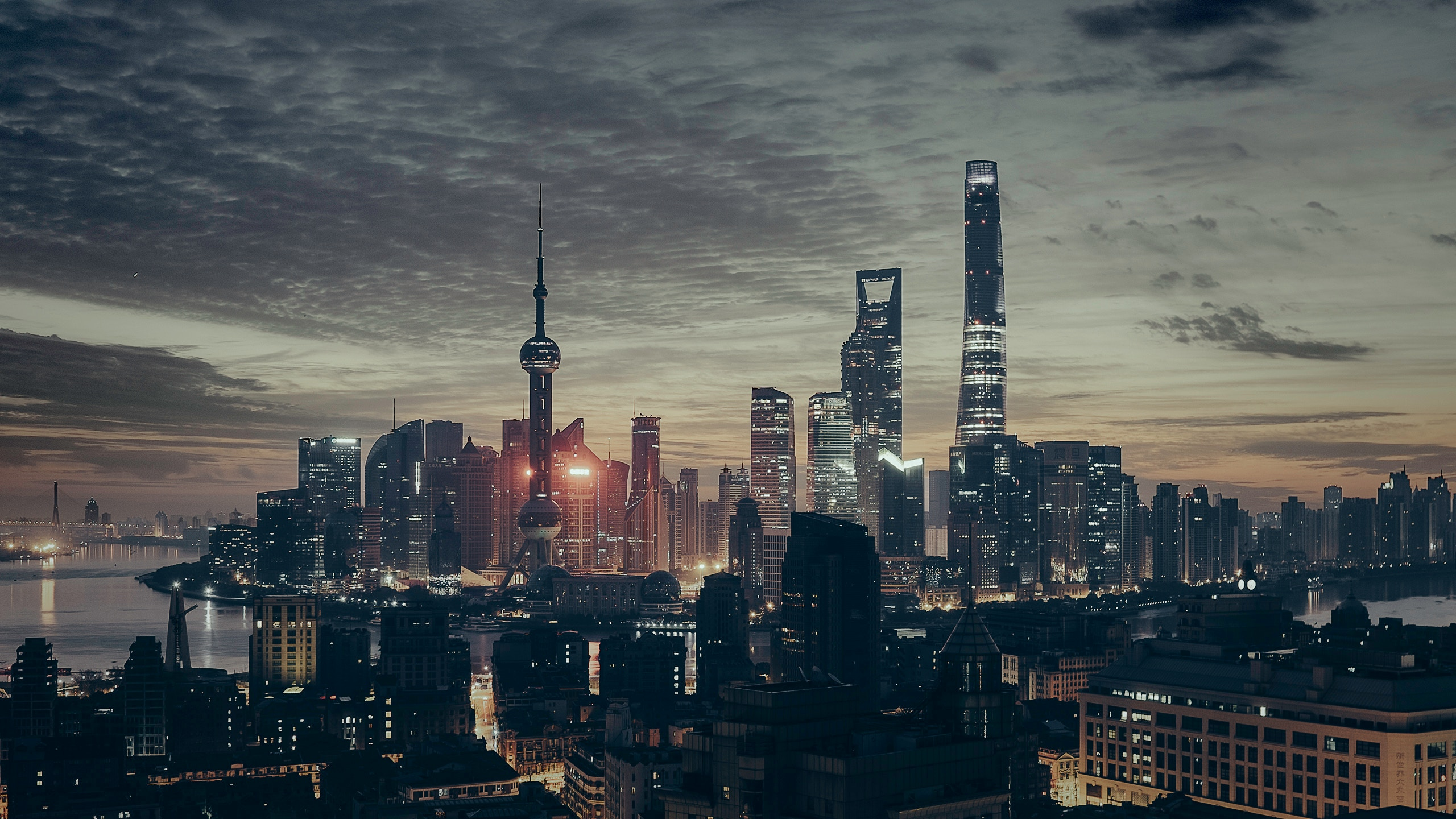
Shanghai Skyline 14 February 2016

Many other Third World countries had seen involvement from the United States and/or the Soviet Union, but solved their political conflicts because of the removal of the ideological interests of those superpowers. As a result of the apparent victory of democracy and capitalism in the Cold War, many more countries adapted these systems, which also allowed them access to the benefits of global trade, as economic power became more prominent than military power in the international arena. However, as the United States maintained global power, its role in many regime changes during the Cold War went mostly officially unacknowledged, even when some, such as El Salvador, Argentina and Indonesia, resulted in extensive human rights violations.

==== Enlargement of NATO ====
NATO East Flank

After the Cold War, NATO has expanded seven times, with the Czech Republic, Hungary and Poland joining in 1999, Bulgaria, Estonia, Latvia, Lithuania, Romania, Slovakia and Slovenia in 2004, Albania and Croatia in 2009, Montenegro in 2017, North Macedonia in 2020, and Finland and Sweden in 2023 and 2024, respectively.

Share of G7 and BRICS World GDP

==== BRICS ====
In the year 2026, BRICS constituted 50% of the world's population, nearly as much GDP, and 26% of the international trade.

==== Key treaties and agreements ====
NASA Administrator Bill Nelson delivers remarks during an Artemis Accords signing ceremony Tuesday, June 7, 2022, prior to the Centre National d’Etudes Spatiales (CNES) 60th Anniversary event at the French Ambassador’s Residence in Washington

In 2026, the New START treaty expired, marking the first time since the 1970s that no active bilateral agreement for nuclear arsenals existed between Russia and the US.

Other important agreements of the era include:

- United Nations Security Council Resolution 2803
- Abraham Accords
- Paris Agreement
- Artemis Accords (Note: As of October 28, 2026, 78 countries have signed the Artemis Accords)

==== Regional blocs and multi-alignment ====
Following the dissolution of the Soviet Union and the end of Cold War bipolarity, international politics increasingly fractured into overlapping regional organizations and issue-specific coalitions rather than a single global alliance system. While Western institutions such as NATO and the European Union expanded across Europe, middle powers and developing nations across the Global South increasingly adopted strategic hedging and multi-alignment maintaining simultaneous economic and diplomatic ties with competing major powers such as the United States, China, and Russia to preserve strategic autonomy.

Major regional and geopolitical blocs in the post–Cold War era
Bloc	Region / Scope	Established	Primary geopolitical role	Strategic posture / Alignment
European Union (EU)	Europe	1993	Economic single market, regulatory superpower, and political union	Western-aligned; closely tied to NATO on security
NATO	North America and Europe	1949 (enlarged post-1991)	Collective defense and military deterrence	U.S.-led Transatlantic security alliance
BRICS	Global (Eurasia, Africa, South America, Middle East)	2009 (expanded 2024)	Economic coordination and reform of global governance institutions	Multipolar; promotes alternatives to Western-led institutions
Shanghai Cooperation Organisation (SCO)	Eurasia	2001	Regional security, counterterrorism, and economic cooperation	Non-Western / Eurasian; led by China and Russia with non-aligned observers/members
ASEAN	Southeast Asia	1967 (expanded 1990s)	Regional stability, trade integration, and consensus diplomacy	Strategic hedging; maintains neutrality between the U.S. and China
African Union (AU)	Africa	2002 (succeeded OAU)	Continental integration, peacekeeping, and collective diplomatic voice	Non-aligned / multi-aligned; joined the G20 in 2023
Mercosur	South America	1991	Customs union, regional trade, and political coordination	Multi-aligned; balances ties across the Americas, Europe, and Asia
CELAC	Latin America and the Caribbean	2010	Regional political dialogue without U.S. or Canadian participation	Autonomous regionalism; diverse ideological alignment
(Cooperation Council for the Arab States of the Gulf) Gulf Cooperation Council (GCC)	Persian Gulf / Middle East	1981	Economic integration, energy policy, and regional security	Traditionally U.S.-allied, increasingly pursuing multi-alignment with Asia
CSTO	Post-Soviet Eurasia	2002	Mutual military defense among former Soviet republics	Russian-led security bloc
Pacific Islands Forum (PIF)	Oceania / Pacific	1971	Regional diplomacy, maritime governance, and climate advocacy	Non-aligned / contested sphere between Western allies and China

=== Technology ===
==== Internet ====
Early Internet backbone map

Dial up connection tone, before dial up was phased out in the 2000s, the tone became ubiquitous in internet culture

The end of the Cold War allowed many technologies that had been off limits to the public to be declassified. The most important of these is the Internet, which was created as ARPANET as a system to keep in touch after an impending nuclear war. The last restrictions on commercial enterprise online were lifted in 1995. The commercialization of the Internet and the growth of the mobile phone system increased globalization (as well as nationalism and populism in reaction). In the years since then, the Internet's population and usefulness have grown immensely. Only about 20 million people (less than 0.5 percent of the world's population at the time) were online in 1995, mostly in the United States and several other Western countries. By the mid-2010s, more than a third of the world's population was online. Satellite internet capabilities advanced significantly in the 2020s, providing an extra layer of redundancy in case of ground infrastructure interruption.

==== Space ====
Assembly of the ISS

(April 6, 2026) – Earthset captured through the Orion spacecraft window at 6:41 p.m. EDT, April 6, 2026, during the Artemis II crew’s flyby of the Moon. A muted blue Earth with bright white clouds sets behind the cratered lunar surface.

Artemis II Crew Poster

The success of Sputnik 1 lead to an increase funding for radio telescopes such as Jodrell Bank Observatory for use in tracking Sputnik and possible nuclear launches by the Soviet Union. Jodrell Bank and other observatories like it have since been used to track space probes as well as investigate quasars, pulsars, and meteoroids. Satellites such as the Vela that were originally launched to detect nuclear detonation following the Partial Nuclear Test Ban Treaty have been used since then to discover and further investigate gamma-ray bursts.

Following a new level of cooperation between Roscomos and NASA in the 1990s the decision to implement the project that was called, the "most complex scientific and political multi-stage project ever undertaken by the Great Powers, the project promises to push the boundaries of what is possible, operates entirely in the New Frontier and represents a new epoch in this history of mankind" began. The station took multiple decades to develop and has been continually occupied since 2000. A new space race began in the 2020s, largely between the United States' Artemis Program and China's Lunar Exploration Program.

===== Reusable launch vehicles =====
Since 1991, cost per kilogram ($/kg) to orbit has reduced by over 95%, driven by the development of reusable launch vehicles (RLVs). Following the early 1993 technical demonstrations of the McDonnell Douglas DC-X vertical-landing prototype, legacy platforms like the Space Shuttle and expendable Titan or Delta rockets remained prohibitively expensive, forcing market costs to hover between $18,500/kg and $54,500/kg through 2010. In December 2015 SpaceX achieved the first successful recovery of an orbital-class Falcon 9 booster, followed by its historic first re-flight in March 2017 and the debut of the heavy-lift Falcon Heavy in February 2018, these brought commercial market pricing down to roughly $1,500 to $3,200/kg.

==== Lithium batteries ====
Existing largely as a experimental lab technology, the supply chain and development of lithium batteries began in earnest after the Cold War. Today they underpin and constitute a large part of the foundation of key modern electronics. Crucially, they replaced heavier forms of batteries in many areas. Prior to lithium technologies, car battery jumpers had to rely on heavy lead-acid, the chemistry of lithium often allows it to deliver more power with less weight. In the 2020s they are part of most EV's, grid storage, micro mobility,and cordless tools.

Chart showing price of lithium-ion batteries, over time

==== Cell networks ====
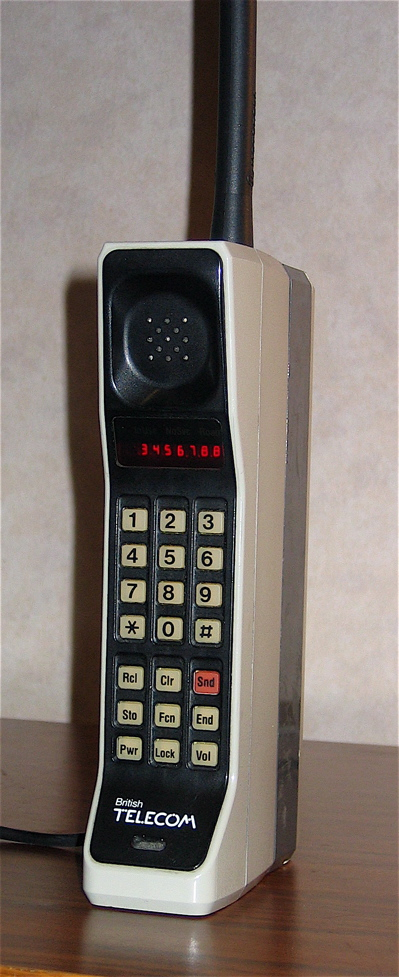
A DynaTAC 8000X, the first commercially available handheld mobile phone from 1984

In the early 1990's cell networks were still largely immature and upgrading to 2G, the first generation of digital airwaves. The development accelerated with each generation increasing capabilities. Ground network infrastructure was built out during this time across the developed and developing world.

==== Advanced manufacturing ====
Advancements in additive manufacturing have made it possible for custom production across medical implants, aerospace, and consumer goods. Parallel advancements in Extreme Ultraviolet lithography enabled microchips to shrink down to single-digit nanometer scales, keeping Moore's Law alive and packing billions of transistors into smartphones and other custom applications.

==== Healthcare technology ====
===== MRI imaging =====
In the 1990s, researchers successfully demonstrated Blood Oxygen Level-Dependent (BOLD) contrast and dynamic susceptibility contrast. This allowed real-time tracking of cerebral blood volume and mapped active human neural pathways for the first time. Diffusion MRI (dMRI) moved out of lab testing into regular clinical software. Fast Spin Echo (FSE) and Echo Planar Imaging (EPI) algorithms became the standard, drastically reducing target acquisition windows.Techniques like SMASH and SENSE were introduced, utilizing multi-element radiofrequency (RF) receiver coil arrays to accelerate image data collection.Scanners equipped with 3T superconducting magnets received regulatory clearance for wide-scale clinical use in the early 2000s. This doubled the signal-to-noise ratio compared to existing 1.5T baselines, offering higher spatial resolution. To manage risks from internal medical hardware (like pacemakers), ASTM International established a universal system classifying devices as MR Safe, MR Conditional, or MR Unsafe. In the 2010s, manufacturers integrated full-body Positron Emission Tomography (PET) and MRI into a unified framework. This allowed doctors to capture precise anatomical structures and metabolic activity simultaneously.

===== Cancer research =====
Joe Biden speaking about Cancer Moonshot at Rice University in 2016.

The overall U.S. cancer death rate dropped by 35% between 1991 and 2024, saving nearly 5 million lives, according to the American Association for Cancer Research (AACR) Cancer Progress Report. The combined 5-year relative survival rate for all cancers has reached 71%. Advancements since 1991 include, harnessing the body's immune system transformed outcomes for formerly intractable cancers like advanced melanoma and lung cancer. Immune checkpoint inhibitors (such as PD-1/PD-L1 and CTLA-4 blockers) made long-term remission possible for many patients. Moving away from blunt chemotherapy, treatments now target specific genetic drivers (such as BCR-ABL in leukemia or HER2 in breast cancer) and personalized mRNA and DNA vaccines, tailored to individual tumor neoantigens or targeting high-risk mutations like KRAS and Lynch syndrome advanced into human clinical trials with durable T-cell responses.

==== Navigation systems ====
Global Navigation Satellite Systems (GNSS) shifted from military assets to dual-use public utilities and represented a novel period in international technology policy. The systemic transition toward full civilian access, accelerating after 1991, laid the technical groundwork for modern commercial logistics, aviation, and consumer technology. The United States Global Positioning System (GPS), managed by the Department of Defense, served as the primary blueprint for this transition. Initially, GPS operated under a bifurcated architecture. The Precise Positioning Service (PPS) provided highly accurate data restricted to US and allied military forces. Conversely, the Standard Positioning Service (SPS) was allocated for civilian use but deliberately degraded via a mechanism known as Selective Availability (SA).

Following the shootdown of Korean Air Lines Flight 007 in 1983, President Ronald Reagan issued a directive guaranteeing civilian access to GPS once the system became fully operational, aiming to enhance maritime and aviation safety. During the 1991 Gulf War, the US military temporarily deactivated Selective Availability. This was necessitated by a shortage of military-grade receivers, forcing coalition troops to utilize commercial GPS units requiring uncompromised signals. This period demonstrated the profound utility of high-precision civilian signals. On May 1, 2000, President Bill Clinton directed the cessation of Selective Availability, effective May 2. This action instantly improved civilian GPS accuracy from approximately 100 meters to under 20 meters, effectively declassifying precision satellite navigation for global public consumption. Recognizing the strategic vulnerability of relying entirely on a spaceborne architecture controlled by the United States military, multiple nations and regional blocs moved to establish, declassify, and commercialize their own independent navigation constellations.

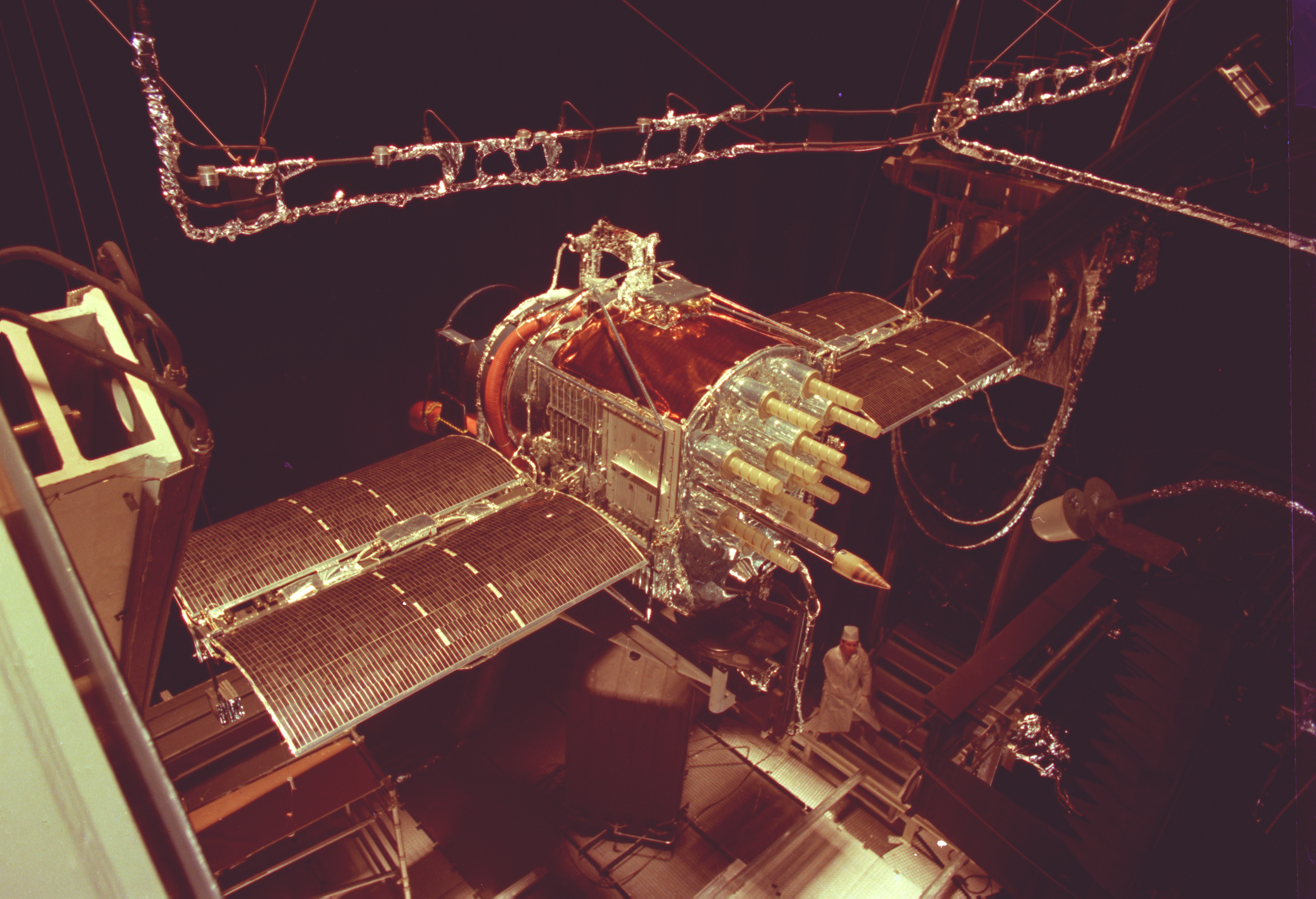
A full-scale GPS was tested in the Mark I Space Chamber at AEDC in 1977. The tests checked reliability of the satellite's systems prior to its launch in 1978. AEDC personnel reflected back on this testing on July 17, 2015, the 20th anniversary of when GPS reached full-operational capability.

===== Country based navigation systems =====
- Originally developed concurrently with GPS during the Soviet era, Russia's Global Navigation Satellite System suffered degradation following the collapse of the Soviet Union in 1991. Throughout the 2000s, Russia restored the constellation to full operational capability. By 2007, President Vladimir Putin signed a decree declassifying GLONASS for unrestricted civilian use globally, offering a direct alternative to GPS.
- Launched as a explicitly civilian-controlled alternative to military-run systems, the European Union began developing Galileo in the late 1990s. Galileo achieved initial operational capability in 2016. Because it was engineered from inception as a commercial and civil utility, it provides high-precision positioning without historical military declassification barriers, though it retains secure tiers for government agencies.
- China initiated its independent positioning program in 1994 to mitigate reliance on foreign networks. Operating in phases, BeiDou expanded from a domestic system (BDS-1) to regional coverage (BDS-2) in 2012, and ultimately achieved full global coverage (BDS-3) in 2020. China actively promotes BDS for international commercial aviation, maritime transport, and domestic infrastructure.
- Developed by the Indian Space Research Organisation (ISRO) following restricted GPS access during the 1999 Kargil War, the Navigation with Indian Constellation focuses on regional autonomy. Fully operational by 2018, NavIC provides positioning services across India and extending 1,500 kilometers beyond its borders, offering both a standard positioning service for open civilian use and a restricted encrypted service.Initiated in the 2000s and operational with a four-satellite constellation by 2018,
- Japan’s "Michibiki" system operates as a regional satellite-based augmentation system. It is specifically designed to optimize civilian GPS signals in the mountainous terrain and urban canyons of East Asia, operating seamlessly alongside the US framework.The modern landscape of satellite navigation has shifted from a unipolar, militarily guarded capability to a multipolar environment of overlapping, interoperable civilian networks. The legal precedent set by the United States’ declassification of GPS created an international standard, forcing subsequent sovereign systems to offer open, high-precision signals to remain viable in the global technological marketplace.

==== Nuclear power ====
NRC Classification for Types of Reactors, Small Modular Reactors (44021367912)

Following president Eisenhower's speech Atoms for Peace, the field of nuclear energy for consumer use began to be formalized. This era included the breakthroughs which made scaling the technology feasible. The first grid connection in the United States occurred on 18 December 1957 with the opening of the Shippingport Atomic Power Station. Alongside continued research defensive countermeasures there has been a proliferation of nuclear weapons around the world. Many nations have acquired technology required to produce nuclear weapons since the end of the Cold War. India tested its first nuclear weapon with Operation Smiling Buddha in 1974. It was followed by Pakistan's nuclear program acquiring centrifuges capable of enriching uranium in the 80's and in 1998 was able to conduct several underground tests. Today the United States, Russia, the United Kingdom, France, and China all possess nuclear weapons and have signed the Nuclear Non-Proliferation Treaty in an attempt to curb the spread of nuclear weapons. India, Pakistan, Israel and North Korea are also in possession of nuclear technology but have not signed the Nuclear Non-Proliferation Treaty. 21st century advancements have included the small modular reactor an increasingly important option as it bypasses the long and cumbersome plant building process.

Worldwide nuclear power timeline graph

==== Weapons systems ====
While Ronald Reagan's Strategic Defense Initiative proved untenable in its original form, the system lives on in a redesigned state as the Aegis Ballistic Missile Defense System (BMDS). Countermeasures such as BMDS continue to be explored and improved upon post–Cold War, but are often criticized for being unable to effectively stop a full nuclear attack. Despite advances in their efficacy, anti-ballistic missiles are often viewed as an additional piece to modern day diplomacy where concepts such as mutual assured destruction and treaties such as that between Ronald Reagan and Mikhail Gorbachev following their Reykjavík Summit. More recently, the broader concept of Reagan's space based system was seen as being revived by the Golden Dome project initiated in the 2020s.

===== Defense Threat Reduction Agency (DTRA) =====
Pentagon research in the years following the end of the Gulf War led senior leaders to conclude that existing munitions, particularly bunker-busters for the hardened and often mountainous terrain of the Middle East were insufficient. DTRA's mission came to be acting as the comprehensive anti-WMD agency. A research program then began which culminated in the GBU-57. Utilizing satellite earth imaging, the United States located the suspected nuclear facilities in Iran and deployed the GBU-57A for the first time during Operation Midnight Hammer.

===== Long range bombers =====
During the Carter administration, what is known today as the B1("Bone") long range bomber was cancelled due to skyrocketing costs. The B1-A featured a laundry list of features that were the result of a decade long studies by the Pentagon. Due to advancements in ballistics during this time, the B1-A needed to have a high payload capacity but able to cruise at high speeds, with top capabilities at Mach 2.2. The incoming Reagan administration reactivated the B1-A and furthered development of the B2 Spirit stealth bomber. At the press conference Reagan said, "I have directed the Secretary of Defense to revitalize our bomber forces by constructing and deploying some 100 B-1 bombers as soon as possible, while continuing to deploy cruise missiles on existing bombers. We will also develop an advanced bomber with "stealth" characteristics for the 1990's, today's plan revitalizes our strategic forces and maintains America's ability to keep the peace well into the next century."

Donald Rumsfeld - Gerald Ford (Oval Office 1974)

Donald Rumsfeld, who had advocated for expanding the B-2 fleet in the late 1990s, shifted his approach upon becoming Secretary of Defense in 2001. Rather than allocating funds to restart the 1980s-era B-2 production line as suggested by defense contractors, Rumsfeld prioritized a broader "transformation" of the military toward modern network-centric warfare. This long-term strategy ultimately materialized as the B-21 Raider, which achieved its maiden flight in November 2023. By 2026, the program had progressed significantly, entering low-rate initial production, demonstrating in-flight aerial refueling capabilities, and receiving an accelerated 25% production capacity boost under a $4.5 billion congressional allocation to rapidly replace the B-1 and B-2.

== Global pandemic ==
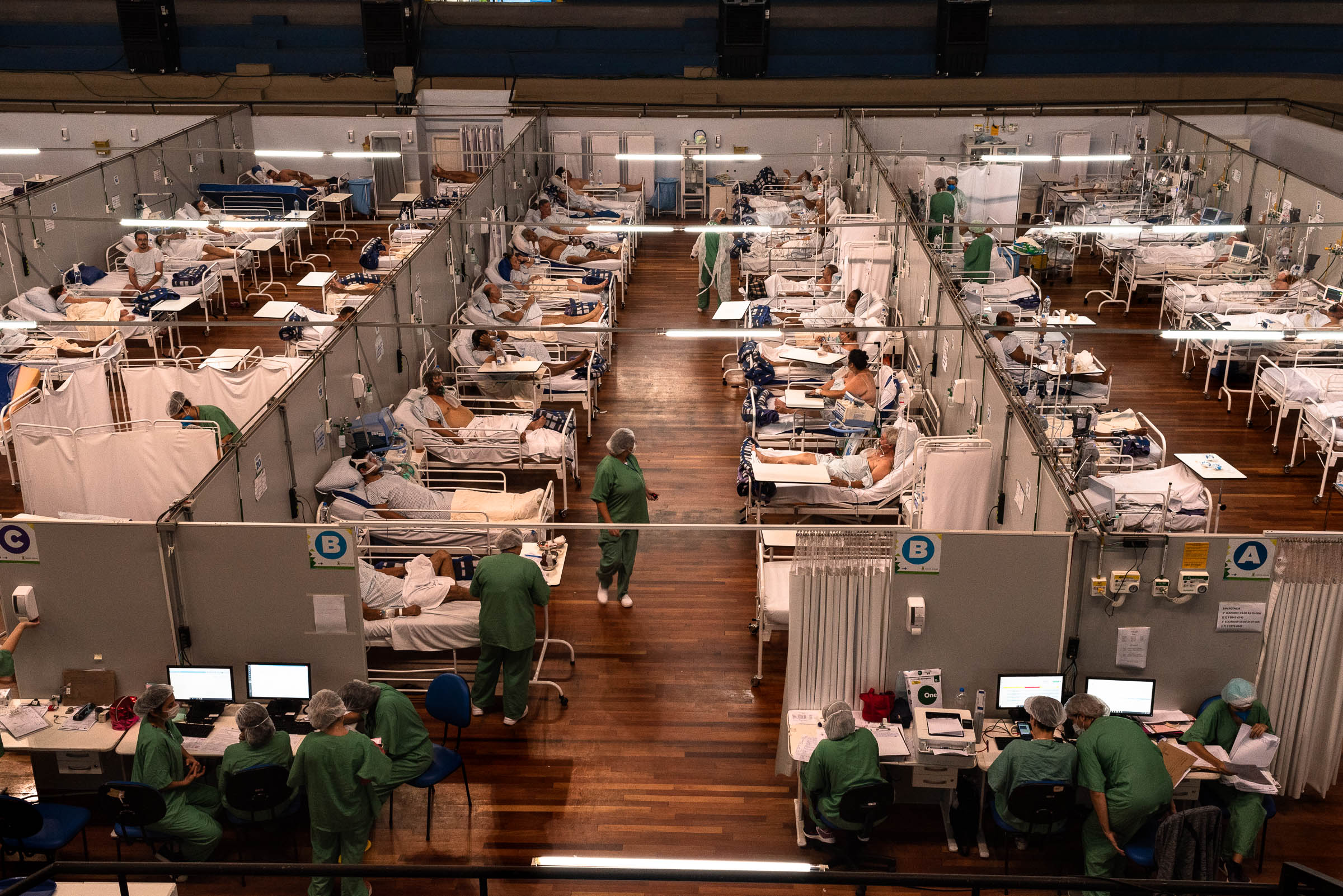
Pedro Dell'Antonia field hospital, in Santo Andre, almost 100% full, after 10 months open

Although scientists and researchers had warned of a global pandemic for years, world governments were still largely unprepared for the emergence of the Covid-19 disease as it spread in a matter of weeks in early 2020. Scientists estimate that there was a 70% chance that Covid-19 would have gone extinct on its own, before reaching the state of an endemic virus. As the nature of the virus became clear, countries were forced to shut down travel, businesses, and the way of life for most of the world, to a degree unprecedented in modern history. Lost global economic output measures up to $22 trillion during this time (most of 2020 through 2022). Governments and health agencies were forced to develop response plans in record time. Efforts in the United States like Operation Warp Speed sought to develop a vaccine, which was successfully released in late 2020. The pandemic became the fifth-deadliest pandemic in history (Note: Total casualties may be higher as countries like India reported unreliable data) and still threatens health outcomes of individuals through long covid. Additional impacts were initially unseen, but as the social distancing mandates expanded metrics like opioid overdoses spiked, particularly with fentanyl, this prompted the crisis to become a political issue.

== Conflicts and geopolitical shifts ==
Shahed drone as recovered in Ukraine (2023)

The first quarter of the 21st century has witnessed a profound transformation in global power dynamics, transitioning away from the post-Cold War unipolarity dominated by the United States toward a fragmented, multipolar geopolitical landscape. The early decades were characterized by highly costly, asymmetrical campaigns like the War in Afghanistan and the Iraq War, which exposed the structural limits of Western military interventionism and sparked an era of relative American strategic retrenchment. This shift opened a vacuum eagerly filled by regional and revisionist powers, as seen in the multi-sided proxy arena of the Syrian Civil War, where international interventions and localized internal struggles completely realigned regional balances of power.

Crucially, the final years of this initial quarter shattered lingering post-Cold War security architectures entirely. The escalation of the Russo-Ukrainian War from the 2014 annexation of Crimea into a full-scale conventional invasion by Russia in 2022 marked the definitive return of high-intensity state-on-state territorial warfare to Europe, forcing a strategic revitalization of NATO's deterrent positioning and driving massive economic fragmentation. Entrenched systemic instability across sub-Saharan Africa manifested in brutal internal power struggles like the Sudanese Civil War, which displaced millions and triggered catastrophic humanitarian crises and the explosive regional spillover of the Israel–Hamas war in the Middle East collectively underscore a new paradigm where localized conflicts rapidly become major tests of global diplomatic resilience, international law, and resource security.

In the Russo-Ukrainian War, the integration of AI-driven edge-computing with commercial drone platforms has transformed the front line into a highly lethal, ten-mile-wide "kill zone", where military analysts estimate that unmanned aerial vehicles (UAVs) are now responsible for 70% to 80% of all battlefield casualties. Historically, electronic jamming could sever the radio connection between a human operator and a drone, causing the aircraft to crash safely. Modern FPV (First-Person View) drones use onboard AI microprocessors (such as commercial Nvidia modules) that require no satellite or radio tether. If jammed, the autonomous system takes complete control during the final flight phase. In the last 500 meters of a strike, onboard machine learning algorithms analyze live optical feeds to identify and lock onto specific targets. The AI can distinguish human silhouettes, moving vehicles, and even specify vulnerable entry points on armored tanks. This terminal autonomy makes rookie drone pilots up to four times more effective, drastically accelerating the military "kill chain". Because these weaponized quadcopters are assembled from cheap, off-the-shelf consumer parts, they are mass-produced by the millions. Ukrainian drone units neutralized over 350,000 Russian drones in the first three quarters of 2026 alone, while automated drone forces routinely claim over 30,000 casualties per month on the front lines. The lack of human oversight in fully autonomous deployments has increasingly placed civilians in harm's way. Striking deep into cities like Kyiv, Odessa, and Zaporizhzhia, self-targeting AI drones have misidentified or collided with civilian infrastructure including business centers, energy grids, and medical centers resulting in widespread non-combatant fatalities far from the active lines of contact.

Major Conflicts of the early 21st Century
Conflict	Years	Primary Location	Main Factions / Belligerents	Impact & Key Developments	Estimated Casualties	Main Article
War in Afghanistan	2001–2021	Afghanistan	United States, NATO (ISAF), Islamic Republic of Afghanistan vs. Taliban, Al-Qaeda	Triggered by the Sept. 11 attacks; resulted in a 20-year asymmetric conflict. Concluded with the withdrawal of Western forces and the Taliban reclaiming governance in 2021.	~176,000+	War in Afghanistan (2001–2021)
Iraq War	2003–2011	Iraq	United States, United Kingdom, coalition forces vs. Ba'athist Iraq (2003), Iraqi insurgent factions	Began with a US-led invasion that overthrew Saddam Hussein. Transitioned into a prolonged insurgency and sectarian conflict until the formal US withdrawal.	150,000–500,000+	Iraq War
Mexican drug war	2006–present	Mexico	Mexican Federal Forces vs. Various rival drug cartels	An ongoing low-intensity conflict initiated by the militarization of the anti-drug campaign, leading to massive civilian casualties and cartel fractionalization.	350,000–450,000+	Mexican drug war
Boko Haram insurgency	2009–present	Nigeria, Cameroon, Niger, Chad	Nigeria and multinational coalition vs. Boko Haram, ISWAP	Islamist insurgency that displaced millions in the Lake Chad basin, marked by extreme violence against civilians and mass abductions.	~350,000	Boko Haram insurgency
Syrian civil war	2011–present	Syria	Assad Government (allied with Russia/Iran) vs. Syrian opposition factions, Kurdish forces, ISIL	Escalated from Arab Spring protests into a devastating multi-sided proxy war, generating one of the largest refugee crises of the modern era.	500,000–610,000+	Syrian civil war
Libyan Civil Wars	2011–present	Libya	National Transitional Council, rival government coalitions (GNA, LNA) vs. Gaddafi regime (2011), various localized militias	Began with a NATO-backed uprising that overthrew Muammar Gaddafi, leading to persistent political fragmentation, dual governments, and localized clashes.	25,000–40,000	Libyan crisis (2011–present)
Yemeni Civil War	2014–present	Yemen, Saudi Arabia	Hadi/Rashad government (backed by Saudi coalition) vs. Houthi movement, Iran-backed factions	Sparked a severe humanitarian crisis. Evolved into maritime escalations, including localized drone strikes, shipping blockades, and international naval responses.	~377,000	Yemeni civil war (2014–present)
War in Iraq (2013–2017)	2014–2017	Iraq	Iraqi Armed Forces, Peshmerga, CJTF-OIR (US-led) vs. ISIL (ISIS)	A major military campaign to recapture extensive territorial gains made by the Islamic State, ending with the territorial defeat of the caliphate in Iraq.	155,000+	War in Iraq (2013–2017)
Russo-Ukrainian War	2014–present	Ukraine	Ukraine vs. Russian Federation	Began with the 2014 annexation of Crimea and escalated into a full-scale conventional invasion by Russia in 2022, marking Europe's largest land conflict since WWII.	~500,000+	Russo-Ukrainian War
Tigray War	2020–2022	Ethiopia (Tigray Region)	Ethiopian National Defense Force, Eritrean Defence Forces vs. Tigray Defense Forces	A high-intensity civil conflict involving severe blockades and widespread displacement, formally concluding with the Pretoria peace agreement.	100,000–600,000	Tigray War
Sudanese Civil War	2023–present	Sudan	Sudanese Armed Forces (SAF) vs. Rapid Support Forces (RSF)	A destructive power struggle between the national military and a powerful paramilitary group, destroying urban centers and triggering catastrophic famine risks.	62,000–150,000+	Sudan conflict (2023–present)
Israel–Hamas war	2023–present	Gaza Strip, Israel, Lebanon	Israel Defense Forces vs. Hamas, Hezbollah, Axis of Resistance	Sparked by the October 7 attacks, evolving into intensive urban combat in Gaza, major regional spillover across Lebanon, and direct proxy escalations.	~65,000+	Israel–Hamas war

== In popular culture ==
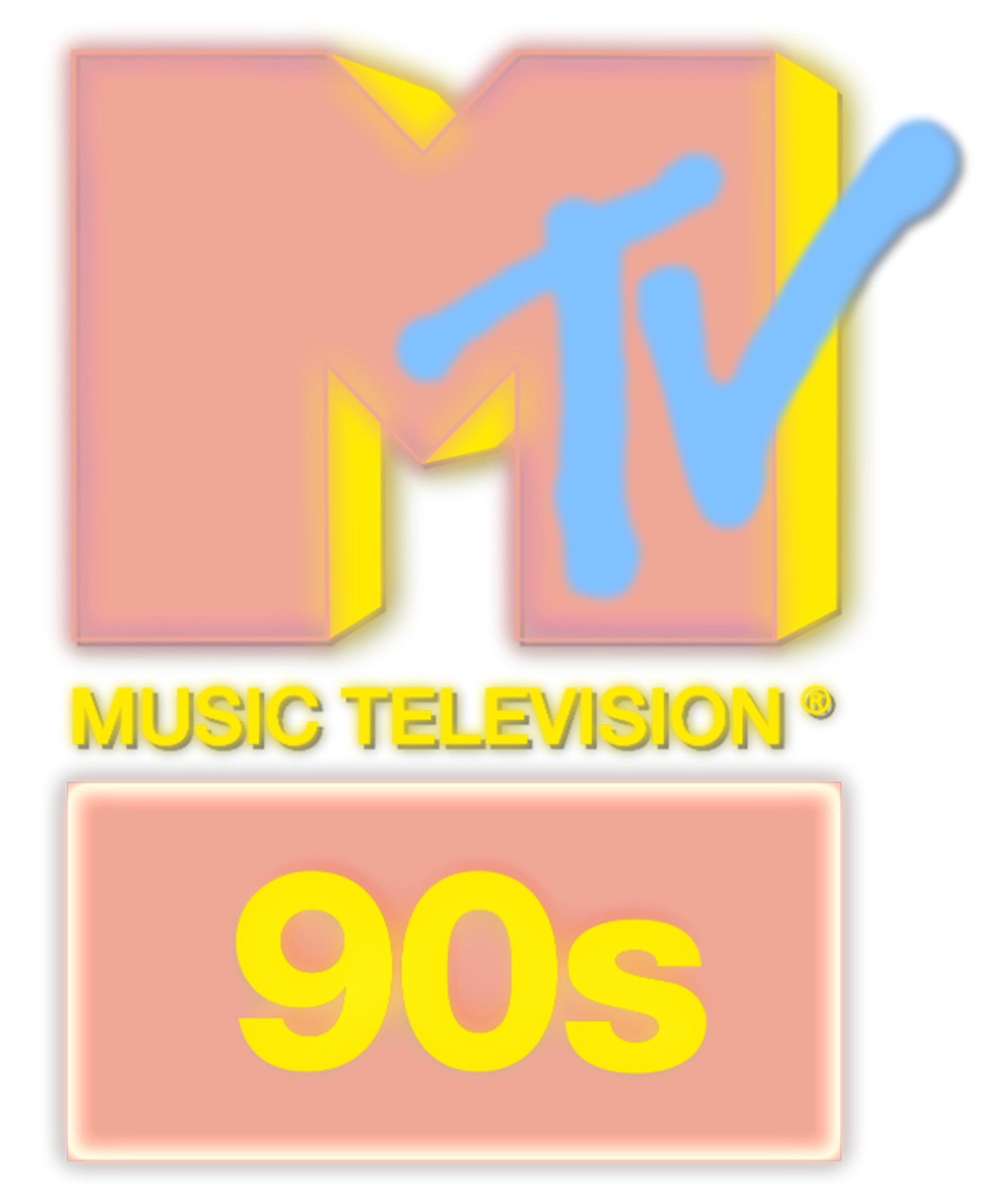
Former MTV 90s logo.

The 1990s became an enduring part of popular culture, including the clothing, television and technology of the era.

== See also ==
- Cold peace
- Second Cold War
- International relations since 1989
- Iran–Israel proxy conflict
- Iran–Saudi Arabia proxy war
- Artificial intelligence arms race
- Information Age
- Interwar period
- Road to Now
- List of ongoing armed conflicts
