= Andra (TV series) =

- Genre: Science fiction
- Based on: Andra by Louise Lawrence
- Written by: Eugene Lumbers
- Directed by: Mark Callen; John Gauci
- Starring: Lisa Peers; Robert Hewett; Jonathan Hardy; Bruce Kerr; Suzanne Dudley
- Country of origin: Australia
- Original language: English
- No. of seasons: 1
- No. of episodes: 8

Production
- Producer: Christopher Muir
- Running time: 30 mins

Original release
- Network: ABC Television
- Release: 10 September – 29 October 1976

Andra is an Australian children's television series based on the book of the same name, which was broadcast on the ABC Television. The series consists of eight episodes of 30 minute. It had such a small budget that in the background, in crowd scenes, the 'crowd' is actually made up of store clothing dummies. The sets, instead of containing items of furniture, or other articles, are large white blocks piled up on each other.

The series targets a female audience but a similar Australian science fiction series, Alpha Scorpio was made a little earlier in the 1970s and aimed at a male audience.

== Cast ==
- Lisa Peers as Andra
- Robert Hewett as Syrd
- Jonathan Hardy as Shenlyn
- Bruce Kerr as Lazcaux
- Suzanne Dudley as Cromer

== Episodes ==
No.	Title	Original release date
1	"Episode 1"	September 10, 1976
Andra, a young citizen in Sub City One, leaves her lecture and wanders into a supply tunnel where she is knocked over and suffers severe brain damage. Dr Lascaux asks for permission to attempt a brain graft using a 2,000-year-old brain.
2	"Episode 2"	September 17, 1976
A spaceship which set out 30 years ago to discover the new Earth, returns into contact, having successfully completed its mission.
3	"Episode 3"	September 24, 1976
4	"Episode 4"	October 1, 1976
A spaceship is prepared to explore the new planet which has been discovered. When it returns with information about the planet, it seems it must crash land and the crew will die.
5	"Episode 5"	October 8, 1976
6	"Episode 6"	October 15, 1976
The expedition party returns to Sub City One–without navigation charts.
7	"Episode 7"	October 22, 1976
8	"Episode 8"	October 29, 1976
Andra realises that the rocket ships for the new planet are about to take off and runs blindly to the surface.
