= Australian science fiction television =

Science fiction television has been produced in Australia since the 1960s, as a homegrown response to imported overseas US and British shows.

The Stranger (1964–65) produced and screened by the Australian Broadcasting Corporation was not only the first locally made sci-fi TV series, but one of the first Australian productions to be sold internationally. Wandjina! (1966) was the first drama production by ABC in Sydney that combined film and videotape footage. During the late 1960s, Artransa Park productions made a number of programmes in collaboration with the Australian Broadcasting Corporation on shoestring budgets. These generally ran for one season on ABC TV before being screen on the commercial channels. These included Vega 4 (1967), The Interpretaris (1968) and Phoenix Five (1970). Phoenix Five was the best known of these. It resembled US shows like Star Trek without the budget and effects, but with a psychedelic rock soundtrack.

There was also Alpha Scorpio (1974) and this led to Andra (1976). Adapted from the novel by Louise Lawrence, Andra won a 1976 Penguin Award for its quality production. The ABC claims to retain copies of Andra in its archives, but controversy surrounds this claim. Insiders claim the tapes were wiped by accident when they were sent to Malaysia.

The ABC produced one further Science Fiction series, the drama Timelapse (1980), featuring Robert Colby and John Meillon in an Orwellian future.

More recently, Australia's best known Science Fiction show was Farscape, made with American co-production. It ran from 1999 to 2003, and was filmed at Sydney's Fox Studios.

A significant proportion of Australian produced science fiction programmes are made for the teens/young Adults market, including the long-running Mr. Squiggle (1959-1999), Watch This Space (1982), The Girl from Tomorrow (1991-1992), Halfway Across the Galaxy and Turn Left (1994-1995), Parallax (2004), and the Jonathan M. Shiff Productions programmes Ocean Girl (1994-1997), Thunderstone (1999-2000), and Cybergirl (2001-2002).

The Australian Children's Television Foundation, a government initiative, produces a number of Science Fiction children's shows, including Spellbinder (1995, in collaboration with Poland), The Miraculous Mellops (1991-1992), and The Crash Zone (1999-2001). A number of these are adaptations of children's books.

In the late 1990s, Community TV in Melbourne (Channel 31) screened the independent science fiction series, Damon Dark, about a government agent who investigates UFO reports and hunts alien invaders, which has gone on to become a webseries for YouTube.

The forthcoming television version of Star Wars will be a Lucasfilm production shot in Sydney.

Other shows like Time Trax, Roar, and Space: Above and Beyond were filmed in Australia, but used mostly US crew and actors.

== See also ==
- Category:Australian science fiction television series
- Science fiction on television

== Bibliography ==
- Juddery, Mark. "The New Science Fictions: An Australian Perspective". Metro Magazine: Media & Education Magazine; Issue 154; Oct 2007; 134-137.
