= Alpha Scorpio =

- Created by: James Davern
- Written by: James Davern
- Directed by: Keith Wilkes; Ric Birch; David Zweck
- Starring: Peter Hepworth; Kevin Wilson; Terry Gill; Neville Thurgood; Alexandra Hines; Kurt Ludescher; Ian Smith
- Theme music composer: Rick Wakeman
- Opening theme: "The Six Wives of Henry VIII"
- Composer: William Doyle
- Country of origin: Australia
- Original language: English
- No. of seasons: 1
- No. of episodes: 6

Production
- Executive producer: James Davern
- Production location: Aireys Inlet, Victoria
- Editor: Geoff Satchell
- Camera setup: Clifton Ellis; Keith Furguson; Terry Michell; Phil Seymour; Dick Willoughby
- Running time: 30 minutes
- Production company: Albatross Film

Original release
- Network: ABC Television
- Release: 21 June – 26 July 1974

Alpha Scorpio is a short-lived Australian children's science fiction television series, written and produced by James Davern, and which aired on ABC Television in 1974. It starred Peter Hepworth and Kevin Wilson as two university students who begin to witness strange events while camping at Aireys Inlet in Victoria. The two soon discover that their friend Mirny (Kurt Ludescher) is a member of a group of aliens who have recently landed from the 5th planet of Antares. The series lasted only six episodes.

== Characters ==
- Andrew (Peter Hepworth)
- Penny (Alexandra Hines)
- Steven (Kevin Wilson)
- McIntyre (Terry Gill)
- Mirny (Kurt Ludescher)
- Bates (Ian Smith)
- Collins (Neville Thurgood)
- Mr. Williams (Frank Wilson)

== Episodes ==
| # | Title | Writers | Original release date | Series No. |
|---|---|---|---|---|
| 1 | "Series One Episode One" | James Davern | 21 June 1974 | #1.01 |
Andy and Steve arrive at Airey's Inlet to stay at Steve's family beachhouse. With two weeks vacation from university, Steve spends his time surfing and meets Penny. Meanwhile, Andy becomes fascinated with the local lighthouse and encounters a mysterious man who lives nearby.

== Plot ==
Andy has brought a seismograph to the holiday hut because he studies geology. The instrument does not record much except artificial vibrations from passing ships and nearby road vehicles. One afternoon the instrument records an event with a duration of about 10 seconds and the local distribution voltage dips at the same time.

On subsequent odd days, the event continues to occur, but slightly earlier each day. Occasionally a weaker, but similar event is recorded by the machine, but it does not seem to follow any set pattern. Steve is out fishing when one of the weaker events occurs and an albatross seen flying overhead mysteriously disappears in front of this eyes.

As the story develops, Steve observes other happenings, such as the lighthouse emitting a beam during the day which seems to match the timetable of passing cargo ships and the occurrence of the weaker event.

Steve works out that the more powerful event occurs every time the star Antares passes through the zenith over Airey's Inlet and a weaker event has occurred earlier that day. (Even though the declination of Antares is −26 deg. 25 min. and the latitude of Airey's Inlet is −38 deg. 27 min. These must be the same for an astronomical object to transit the zenith at that location once each sidereal day.) All the while, Steve is fostering a relationship with the mysterious old fisherman, Mirny, and police detectives in fedoras are seen poking about near the base of the lighthouse.

At the climax of the story, it turns out that Mirny is actually a member of an extraterrestrial race sent to Earth to procure deuterium oxide to use as fuel for their dying star which is Antares (or Alpha Scorpii to use its Bayer designation).

The lighthouse has been modified by the Antarians into a transmat beam to take the deuterium oxide from passing cargo ships. A much more powerful transmat beam has been set up at the bottom of a well next to the Antarians' underground base. It is the operation of these transmat beams that Steve is detecting with his seismograph: the weak events when the deuterium oxide is beamed from the ship to the lighthouse and the more powerful event when beaming the deuterium oxide back to the Antares system as it passes overhead above the well. The device needs so much power to cover the 550-light-year gap back to Antares that it momentarily overloads the town's substation.

The albatross, seen to disappear by Steve, flew into the operating transmat beam as deuterium oxide was being transferred from a passing cargo ship.

In the final episode, Mirny reveals his true identity and the purpose they are on Earth. Steve and Andy understand their great need to keep their star going as the detectives close in.

Mirny and his colleagues use the high-powered transmat one last time to beam themselves home with the last lot of deuterium oxide, just evading the police. The transmat device is destroyed in this last herculean effort and sea water rushes in to flood the well and underground base, destroying all trace of the visiting extraterrestrials.

Steve and Andy return to Uni with their little secret.

== Technical issues ==
The original was filmed using 35mm monochrome stock and the lighting and sets were relatively primitive due to the low budget.

All episodes exist in the National Archives of Australia.

Another, equally difficult to procure children's series from the same production team, made around the same time, Andra, also exists based on the novel by Louise Lawrence. Whereas Alpha Scorpio was directed at a pre-pubescent male audience, Andra was directed at a pre-pubescent female audience but the plot was equally intriguing.
