= Jonathan Hardy =

New Zealand actor (1940–2012)

- Born: 20 September 1940; Wellington, New Zealand
- Died: 30 July 2012 (aged 71); Southern Highlands, New South Wales, Australia
- Education: New Zealand Players' Drama School; London Academy of Music and Dramatic Art
- Occupations: Actor, writer, director
- Years active: 1966–2012
- Partner: David Letch

Jonathan Hardy (20 September 1940 – 30 July 2012) was a New Zealand-Australian film and television actor, writer and director.

== Early life and education ==
Hardy was born in Wellington, New Zealand on 20 September 1940, to cavalry officer Captain Burnby Hardy and Mary Hardy (nee Philpott). His father was killed by a sniper in Crete that same year, and his mother died when Hardy was only 19.

He began his training at the New Zealand Players' Drama School. He then traveled to Britain, where he studied at the London Academy of Music and Dramatic Art (LAMDA) and was a gold medal student. He also spent time doing vocal study in Spain.

== Career ==
Hardy's acting career lasted for over 40 years, from 1966 to 2012.

=== Theatre ===
Hardy preferred to work on the stage. Following his studies in the UK, he attracted interest from the Royal Shakespeare Company and the Royal National Theatre where he secured contracts, as well as the Bristol Old Vic and several regional theatres.

He returned to his home in New Zealand in a touring production of The Comedy of Errors with the Royal Shakespeare Company in 1966, and remained to help expand the country's early theatre industry.

Hardy relocated to Australia in 1972, but also returned to New Zealand regularly throughout the mid 1980s, to perform as a guest actor with Auckland Theatre Company, including playing Willy Loman in a production of Death of a Salesman. He headed the Melbourne Theatre Company’s youth wing for two years. In 1978 he appeared in the premiere stage production of Kenneth G. Ross's Australian play Breaker Morant, presented by the Melbourne Theatre Company at the Athenaeum theatre, in Melbourne, Victoria, Australia, on Thursday, 2 February 1978. The play was subsequently adapted into a film, for which Hardy co-wrote the script, earning him a 1981 Academy Awards nomination for Best Adapted Screenplay.

Hardy then became Artistic Director of Auckland's Mercury Theatre, a role he undertook for five years. He also played Captain Ahab in Moby Dick—Rehearsed and appeared in Gallipoli saga Once on Chunuk Bair.

Hardy had long engagements with major theatre companies in both Melbourne and Sydney. His roles ranged from a Christmas pantomime of Cinderella, Shakespeare, opera and topical plays such as And in the End: The Life and Death of John Lennon.

In his obituary, he is quoted by Mark Juddery as saying, "The actor is in control in the theatre... so the theatre is much more an actor's medium" and "Television is not anything but an actor's image... If my image happens to fit, then I do the job. Whereas on stage you can create an illusion, on television… it's pretty cliched."

=== Film ===
Hardy appeared in over 20 films, guest-starred in over 26 television series, and acted in many television movies and miniseries. His early roles included the BBC children's time travel series Mandog in 1972, and a small role in the London-set Australian comedy feature The Adventures of Barry McKenzie that same year.

His film work continued with the 1976 Fred Schepisi feature The Devil's Playground, for which he was nominated for an Australian Film Institute award. He also starred in George Miller dystopian action classic Mad Max in 1979, and appeared in The Sullivans TV movie spin-off The John Sullivan Story that same year.

At Italy's MystFest, Hardy was the co-winner of Best Artistic Contribution for his role in 1982 horror film Scarecrow. He later appeared in Mr. Reliable aka My Entire Life (1996) alongside Colin Friels and Jacqueline McKenzie, and the Baz Luhrmann musical epic Moulin Rouge! (2001), in which he played the character of the 'Man in the Moon', for whom Plácido Domingo supplied the singing voice. He won a New Zealand Film and TV Award in 2001, for his performance in 2000 short film Camping with Camus. He then appeared in the 2003 feature Ned Kelly, opposite Heath Ledger and Orlando Bloom, playing 'The Great Orlando'.

Hardy became best known to international audiences for providing the voice of diminutive alien ex-royal leader Dominar Rygel XVI in the science fiction series Farscape from 1999 to 2003, and its subsequent 2004 made-for-television film Farscape: The Peacekeeper Wars. Farscape was filmed in Sydney, Australia, but was a United States production. Although the series was unsuccessful in Australia, Hardy developed a cult following and made appearances at sci-fi conventions.

Hardy's other television roles include Josef Goldman in Twenty Good Years in 1979, and the miniseries' Power Without Glory (1976) The Mackenzie Affair (1977) and Against the Wind (1978). He made guest appearances in numerous television series including Rush, Bluey, Young Ramsay, The Truckies, The Sullivans, Prisoner, Under the Mountain, Butterfly Island, Rafferty's Rules, G.P., Mission: Impossible, E Street, The Flying Doctors, A Country Practice, The Adventures of Skippy, Snowy River: The McGregor Saga, Fire, Medivac, Twisted Tales, All Saints, State Coroner, Above the Law, The Secret Life of Us, Stingers, MDA and Magical Tales.

Along with David Stevens and Bruce Beresford, Hardy co-wrote the screenplay for the film Breaker Morant, for which he received an Australian Film Institute Award (1980), and was nominated for an Academy Award (1981). He also wrote and directed the movie Backstage, starring the Grammy nominated pop vocalist Laura Branigan. His screen directing career however, failed to take off. He was set to direct one of The Man from Snowy River sequels, when he experienced heart problems and underwent a heart transplant.

== Awards ==
Year	Work	Award	Category	Result
1976	The Devil's Playground	Australian Film Institute Award	Best Actor in a Supporting Role	Nominated
1980	Breaker Morant	Australian Film Institute Award	Best Screenplay	Won
1981	Breaker Morant	Academy Award	Best Adapted Screenplay	Nominated
1982	Scarecrow	MystFest	Best Artistic Contribution	Co-winner
1993	Romeo and Juliet / The Shaughraun	Matilda Award	Best Performance	Won
2001	Camping with Camus	New Zealand Film and TV Award	Best Short Film Performance	Won

== Personal life and death ==
Hardy's partner for over 40 years was actor-director David Letch. They worked on many projects together.

Hardy had a successful heart transplant.

Hardy died, aged 71, at his home in the town of Hill Top, in the Southern Highlands of New South Wales on 30 July 2012. He had developed sepsis after undergoing an operation on his leg to restore mobility.

== Film ==
=== As actor ===
Year	Title	Role	Notes	Ref
1972	The Adventures of Barry McKenzie	Groove Courtenay		
1974	Moving On	Anne's Boyfriend		
1976	The Devil's Playground	Brother Arnold		
1977	The Mango Tree	Joe Speight		
1979	Mad Max	Labatouche		
1982	Klynham Summer (aka The Scarecrow)	Charlie Dabney		
1982	Lonely Hearts	Bruce		
1984	Constance	Randolf Grieve		
1984	Death Warmed Up	Ranji Gandhi		
1985	Wills & Burke	John Macadam		
1985	My Letter to George (aka Mesmerized)	Burley		
1985	Lie of the Land	Doctor Max Steiner		
1989	The Delinquents	Magistrate		
1989	Bloodmoon	Mayor		
1993	The Nostradamus Kid	'General Booth Enters Heaven' Strolling Player		
1995	Tunnel Vision	Henry Adams		
1996	Mr. Reliable (aka My Entire Life)	Reverend McIntyre		
1997	Dust Off the Wings	Celebrant		
1997	Down Rusty Down	Otis	Short	
2001	Camping with Camus	Uncle Blick	Short	
2001	Moulin Rouge!	Man in the Moon		
2003	Ned Kelly	The Great Orlando		
2005	Severance	Therapy Group		
2006	Hunt Angels	Magistrate		
2006	Wishbone	Homeless Man		
2009	Big in Japan	Dr Timpleton	Short	

=== As writer/director ===
Year	Title	Role	Notes	Ref
1980	Breaker Morant	Director / Co-writer		
1984	Constance	Writer		
1988	Backstage	Co-writer		
1988	Return to Snowy River	Director's Associate		
2006	Wishbone	Writer		

== Television ==
=== As actor ===
Year	Title	Role	Notes	Ref
1972	Mandog	Halmer	5 episodes	
1972	Redheap	Henry	Miniseries, 3 episodes	
1974	Rush	Yorkshire Goldminer	1 episode	
1976	Andra	Shenlyn	6 episodes	
1976	Power Without Glory	Paddy Kelleher / Rev. Joggins	Miniseries, 3 episodes	
1977	Bluey	Benny Allman	1 episode	
1977	Young Ramsay	Colonel Flynn	1 episode	
1977	The Trial of Ned Kelly		TV movie	
1977	The Mackenzie Affair	Judge	Miniseries	
1978	The Truckies		1 episode	
1978	Against the Wind	Sam Fitchett	Miniseries, 1 episode	
1978	The Sullivans	Captain	1 episode	
1979	The John Sullivan Story	Vlad	TV movie	
1979	Twenty Good Years	Josef Goldman	12 episodes	
1980–1981	Prisoner: Cell Block H	Waller / Mr Potter	3 episodes	
1981	Under the Mountain	Country Policeman	1 episode	
1983	Nearly No Christmas	Mr Rich	TV movie	
1984; 1986	Heroes	Shopkeeper	2 episodes	
1985	Butterfly Island			
1985	Hanlon	Judge		
1989	Rafferty's Rules	Mr Linnehan	1 episode	
1989	Mission: Impossible	Etienne Reynard	1 episode	
1989–1993	E Street	Liam Buckley	3 episodes	
1990	Family and Friends	Brother Ignatius		
1990	The Flying Doctors	Tyler Wells	1 episode	
1990	More Winners	Mr Bretherton		
1990	A Country Practice	Patrick Gardner	1 episode	
1992	The Adventures of Skippy	Grandad Bill	2 episodes	
1995	G.P.	Robert Houghton	1 episode	
1995	Mission Top Secret	Bombalini	1 episode	
1995	Tunnel Vision	Henry Adams	TV movie	
1996	The Thorn Birds: The Missing Years	Father Emilio	TV movie	
1996	Snowy River: The McGregor Saga	John Archer snr	1 episode	
1996	Fire	Sgt Steve	1 episode	
1996	Medivac	Rosenthal	1 episode	
1997	Twisted Tales	Roger Mormon	1 episode	
1997	Terrain	Giles Ballard	TV movie	
1998	All Saints	Cliff Unwin	1 episode	
1998	State Coroner	Steve Capelli	1 episode	
1999–2003	Farscape	Voice of Dominar Rygel XVI	86 episodes	
2000	Above the Law	Stan the Fingers	1 episode	
2003	The Secret Life of Us	Tribunal Man	1 episode	
2003	Stingers	Stephen Betjeman	1 episode	
2003	MDA	Justice Tulloch	2 episodes	
2004	Farscape: The Peacekeeper Wars	Voice of Dominar Rygel XVI	Miniseries, 2 episodes	
2012	Magical Tales	Wally	1 episode (final television appearance)	

=== As writer/producer ===
Year	Title	Role	Notes	Ref
1987	Porters	Writer / Producer	Episode 5	
1992	The Adventures of Skippy	Writer		

== Stage (selected) ==
=== As performer ===
Year	Title	Role	Notes	Ref.
1966	The Comedy of Errors		Royal Shakespeare Company UK & NZ tour	
	H.M.S. Pinafore	Deadeye Dick		
1966–1967	The Taming of the Shrew		Bristol Old Vic, UK	
1967	The Government Inspector		Bristol Old Vic, UK	
1967	Strife		Bristol Old Vic, UK	
1967	War and Peace	General Kutusov / Karatayev	Bristol Old Vic & UK South West Arts tour	
1967	The Beggar's Opera	Curl-Pated Hugh / Lockit	Connaught Theatre, Worthing, UK	
1968	Oedipus	Chorus	The Old Vic, London with National Theatre	
1968	Edward II	Hardy	The Old Vic, London with National Theatre	
1972	The Last Supper Show		Nimrod, Sydney	
1972; 1973	Flash Jim Vaux	James Hardy Vaux	Nimrod, Sydney, Russell St Theatre, Melbourne with MTC	
1973	Jumpers		Russell St Theatre, Melbourne with MTC	
1973	The Prisoner of Second Avenue		Russell St Theatre, Melbourne with MTC	
1973	The Plough and the Stars		Russell St Theatre, Melbourne with MTC	
1973	Batman's Beach-Head		Comedy Theatre, Melbourne with MTC	
1973	Paying the Piper		Comedy Theatre, Melbourne with MTC	
1973–1975	The Last of the Knucklemen	Producer	Canberra & Australian tour with MTC	
1974	Coralie Lansdowne Says No		MTC	
1975	The Double Dealer	Singer	MTC	
1976	Don Pasquale	Singer	Victorian Opera Company	
1976	The Diary of a Madman	Propftchkin (also adaptor)	MTC	
1976	Orpheus & Eurydice		Arts Centre Melbourne with Victoria State Opera	
1977	Cop Out		Russell St Theatre, Melbourne with MTC	
1977	Trumpets and Drums		Mercury Theatre, Auckland	
1977	The Merchant of Venice		Melbourne Athenaeum with MTC	
1978	Breaker Morant	Major James Francis Thomas	Melbourne Athenaeum with MTC	
1978	Richard III	Duke of Buckingham	Melbourne Athenaeum with MTC	
1978	The Beaux' Stratagem		MTC	
1978	The Fool's-Shoe Hotel		Pram Factory, Melbourne with APG	
1979	The Immortalist	279	Playbox Theatre, Melbourne with Hoopla Theatre Foundation	
1979	The Marriage of Figaro		Canberra Opera	
1979	The Alchemist		Melbourne Athenaeum with MTC	
1979–1980	Hamlet	Polonius	Melbourne Athenaeum with MTC	
1980	Rosencrantz and Guildenstern are Dead	Polonius	Melbourne Athenaeum with MTC	
1980	Cinderella	Gumble	Melbourne Athenaeum with MTC	
1980	Comedians		Mercury Theatre, Auckland	
1981	Hancock's Last Half Hour		Mercury Theatre, Auckland	
1981	Moby Dick—Rehearsed	Captain Ahab	Mercury Theatre, Auckland	
	Oh, What a Lovely War!		New Zealand Theatre Company	
	The Hollow Crown		New Zealand Theatre Company	
	Einstein	Albert Einstein		
	Peter Pan	Captain Hook		
1985	Two		Universal Theatre, Melbourne	
1990	Shadow and Splendour	General Schon (Russian general)	Suncorp Theatre, Brisbane with QTC & STCSA	
1991	The Crucible	Deputy Governor Danforth	QTC	
1992	Twelfth Night		QTC	
1992	Hotel Sorrento		QTC	
1993	The Beaux Stratagem'	Boniface	Suncorp Theatre, Brisbane with QTC	
1993	Romeo and Juliet			
1993	A Christmas Carol		Oxford Productions International	
1993	And a Nightingale Sang		QTC	
1993–1995	The Shaughraun or The Loveable Rascal	Father Dolan	QTC, Playhouse, Melbourne with MTC	
1994	Hysteria, or Fragments of an Analysis of an Obsessional Mind	Abraham Yahoda	Playhouse, Melbourne with MTC	
1994	Twelve Angry Men		Auckland Theatre Company	
1995	Rosencrantz and Guildenstern are Dead		Pork Chop Productions	
1996	The Surgical Table		Renegade Theatre	
1996	Simpatico	Wombat	Wharf Theatre, Sydney with STC	
1996	Life of Galileo		STC	
1996	Coriolanus	Menenius Agrippa	Australian tour with Bell Shakespeare	
1997	Pygmalion		Canberra Theatre, STC, Glen St Theatre, Sydney & Q Theatre, Penrith	
1997	QTC Oz Shorts 1		QTC	
1997	The Comedy of Errors	Solinus	Sydney Opera House with STC	
1998	Tannhauser	Singer	Opera Australia	
1998	She Stoops to Conquer		Auckland Theatre Company	
1999	The Cripple of Inishmaan	Johnny Patten Mike	Auckland Theatre Company	
2000	Death of a Salesman	Willy Loman	Auckland Theatre Company	
2002; 2003	Great Expectations	Jaggers	Playhouse, Melbourne with MTC, Sydney Opera House	
2003	A Tree, Falling	Lenny	Chapel off Chapel, Melbourne with Shy Tiger Productions	
2004	Twelfth Night	Feste	Australian tour with Bell Shakespeare	
2004	One Flea Spare	Bunce	Queensize Productions	
2005	Treemonisha	Narrator	The Queensland Choir	
2005	The Department Store		Parnassus' Den	
2006	Renaissance		Parnassus' Den	
2006	And in the End: The Death and Life of John Lennon	Gatekeepers of the White Light / various	Parade Theatre, Sydney with The Walrius Group	
2007	Paul	Nero	Company B Belvoir	
2007	The Pillowman	Tupolski	Maidment Theatre with Auckland Theatre Company	
2008	Twelfth Night	Feste	Sydney Opera House with Bell Shakespeare	

=== As director/producer/writer ===
Year	Title	Role	Notes	Ref.
1974	The Importance of Being Earnest	Director / Producer	MTC	
1975	MTC Theatre in Education: Headlines	Director	MTC	
1975	MTC Theatre in Education: Cupid in Transit 2	Director	MTC	
1976	The Italian Girl in Algiers	Director	Victoria State Opera	
1976	The Diary of a Madman	Adaptor (also actor)	MTC	
1978	The Last of the Knucklemen	Producer	Mercury Theatre, Auckland with MTC	
1979	The Marriage of Figaro	Producer	Canberra Opera Society	
1979	The Elixir of Love	Director	Victorian regional tour with Victorian State Opera	
1980	Nine Little Australians! Season Two	Director	MTC	
1980	Just One Last Dance	Director	Mercury Theatre, Auckland	
1981	The Taming of the Shrew	Director	Mercury Theatre, Auckland	
1981	Bodies	Director	Mercury Theatre, Auckland	
1981	The Importance of Being Earnest	Director	Mercury Theatre, Auckland	
1981	Sauce for the Gander	Director	Mercury Theatre, Auckland	
1982	Once on Chunuk Bair	Production Assistant / Script Advisor	Mercury Theatre, Auckland	
1982	Once a Catholic	Director	Mercury Theatre, Auckland	
1982	Aladdin		Mercury Theatre, Auckland	
1982	Foreskin's Lament	Director	Mercury Theatre, Auckland	
1982	Jesus Christ Superstar	Director	Mercury Theatre, Auckland	
1983	The Elixir of Love	Director	Mercury Theatre, Auckland	
1983	King of Hearts	Director	Mercury Theatre, Auckland	
1983	Madama Butterfly	Director	Mercury Theatre, Auckland	
1984	Who’s Afraid of Virginia Woolf?	Director	Mercury Theatre, Auckland	
1985	Nine Little Australians!: The St Kild Soirees of Bonnie Smith	Director	Melbourne Athenaeum with Melbourne Writers Theatre & MTC	
1985	Nine Little Australians!: Fifteen Rounds with Gorgeous George	Director	Melbourne Athenaeum with Melbourne Writers Theatre & MTC	
1997	Jungfrau	Writer	Playbox Theatre Company	
2000	The Beauty Queen of Leenane	Director	Auckland Theatre Company	
