= Room for Improvement =

Room for Improvement may refer to:

- Room for Improvement (mixtape), a music compilation by Canadian artist Drake
- Room for Improvement (TV series), a 2003 Australian lifestyle television series
