= Breakfast-a-Go-Go =

Breakfast-A-Go-Go may refer to:

- Fredd Bear's Breakfast-A-Go-Go (1969 – 1972)
- Breakfast-A-Go-Go (1971), renaming of Good Morning!!! (Australian show)
