= You're Only Young Twice (disambiguation) =

You're Only Young Twice may refer to:

- You're Only Young Twice, a 1977 British TV sitcom
- You're Only Young Twice (film), a 1952 British comedy film
- You're Only Young Twice (1971 TV series), a 1971 British TV series believed to be lost
