= Anthony Jackson (actor) =

English actor (1944–2006)

- Born: Anthony Thomas Jackson; 18 February 1944; Birmingham, Warwickshire, England
- Died: 26 November 2006 (aged 62); London, England
- Education: Rose Bruford College
- Years active: 1968–2006

Anthony Thomas Jackson (18 February 1944 – 26 November 2006) was an English actor. He appeared as the founder of the eponymous ghost hiring agency in the BBC children's comedy series Rentaghost and as Sid Abbott's neighbour Trevor, in the sitcom Bless This House.

Jackson began his career with the Birmingham Repertory Theatre. He studied at Rose Bruford College and in 1965 joined the Radio Drama Company by winning the Carleton Hobbs Bursary. Later he played at the Mermaid Theatre and the Nottingham Playhouse.

== Roles ==
Jackson played the part of The Tale Bearer (a narrator not included in the original story) in the 1968 BBC Radio 4 dramatisation of J. R. R. Tolkien's The Hobbit.

Jackson also provided a large number of voices in the animated children's series Ivor the Engine and went on to have roles in many long-running British television series. He also appeared in the sitcoms Bless This House, All Our Saturdays, Mind Your Language, Citizen Smith, The Detectives, Lovejoy, Softly, Softly, Barlow at Large and Only Fools and Horses. In his final years, he appeared in The Bill, Casualty, Footballers' Wives and Doctors.

== Voiceover ==
Jackson also did voiceovers for animation including the TV series The Dreamstone, Budgie the Little Helicopter, Zokko!, The Ed and Zed Show, Shakespeare: The Animated Tales, Watership Down, The World of Peter Rabbit and Friends and Testament: The Bible in Animation and the film A Monkey's Tale.

He also did voices in live-action shows and films including The Storyteller, Labyrinth and A.D.A.M.

He found a niche in The Godot Company, and became one of its principal members.

== Death ==
Jackson died of cancer in London on 26 November 2006, having been ill during rehearsals of Waiting for Godot whilst the company was touring in Ireland.

== Filmography ==
=== Film ===
Year	Title	Role	Notes
1968	2001: A Space Odyssey	Ape	Credited as Tony Jackson
1975	Jungle Burger	Voice	English version, Credited as Tony Jackson
1976	Dawnbreakers	Unknown	Short film
1986	Labyrinth	The Four Guards Goblin (voice)	
1999	A Monkey's Tale	Additional voices	English version

=== Television ===
Year	Title	Role	Notes
1968	Z Cars	Mick Bentley (as Tony Jackson)	Episode: "You Can't Win 'Em All!: Part 1"
1969	Doctor in the House	Ponsonby (as Tony Jackson)	Episode: "The War of the Mascots"
1969	Happy Ever After	Joe Fowler	Episode: "Fowler's Day"
1968–1970	Zokko!	Voice	21 episodes
1970	Softly, Softly: Task Force	Corry	Episode: "The Hermit"
1970	Wicked Women	Richard Timms (as Tony Jackson)	Episode: "Anne Maria Moody"
1970	If It Moves, File It	Bill	Episode: "Lost and Found"
1970	Tales of Unease	Derek	Episode: "Ride, Ride"
1970	The Ed and Zed Show	Voice	9 episodes
1970	Beyond Belief	Unknown	
1971	The Liver Birds	Wilf (as Tony Jackson)	Episode: "The Holiday Fund aka Housekeeping"
1971	Rules, Rules, Rules	Mr. Plenty	Episode: "Too Many Rules"
1971	Father, Dear Father	Milkman	Episode: "The Naked Truth"
1971	You're Only Young Twice	Benny	6 episodes
1972	Mike and Bernie	Milkman	Episode: "The Dog It Was That Died"
1972	Three in a Bed	Bert	Television film
1972	Love Thy Neighbour	Malcolm	Episode: "The T.U.C. Conference '72"
1972	Thirty Minutes Worth	Unknown	Episode: #1.3
1973	Barlow	Bernie Crane	Episode: "Review"
1973	All Our Saturdays	Frank Bosomworth	6 episodes
1973	ITV Sunday Night Theatre	The Voice of A.D.A.M.	Episode: "A.D.A.M.", voice
1971–1976	Bless This House	Trevor Lewis	44 episodes
1976	Spring and Autumn	Jim the milkman	Episode: #4.3
1976	Ivor the Engine	Dai Station Evans the Song Mr. Dinwiddy	14 episodes, voice
1977	Whodunnit?	Bill Jennings	2 episodes
1977–1978	BBC2 Play of the Week	Charles Richard Smith	2 episodes
1978	Mind Your Language	Mr Jarvis	Episode: "A Point of Honour"
1976–1979	Rentaghost	Fred Mumford	24 episodes
1980	Citizen Smith	Italian Barman	Episode: "Buon Natale"
1981	Bognor	Barnabas	6 episodes
1982	Frost in May	Lister	Episode: "The Sugar House"
1982	Only Fools and Horses	Juan the Spanish Prison Guard	Episode: "It Never Rains..."
1984	Bootle Saddles	Man (as Tony Jackson)	Episode: "Besieged, Bothered and Bewildered"
1986	Lovejoy	Brian	3 episodes
1986	EastEnders	Carpet Salesman	Episode: #1.122
1987	Bust	Sales Manager	Episode: "Stag at Bay"
1988	The StoryTeller	Devil (as Tony Jackson)	Episode: "The Soldier and Death", voice
1990	The Dreamstone	Nug Mr. Blossom	Voice
1992	Shakespeare: The Animated Tales	Puck	Episode: "A Midsummer Night's Dream", voice
1992	Boon	Bert	Episode: "Shot in the Dark"
1994	The World of Peter Rabbit and Friends	Policeman	Episode: "The Tale of Pigling Bland", voice
1995	The Governor	Matthew Effinger (uncredited)	Episode: #1.1
1995	Rich Deceiver	Night Club Singer (as Tony Jackson)	Television film
1996	The Detectives	First copper	Episode: "Sacked"
1994–1996	Budgie the Little Helicopter	Don Ken (as Tony Jackson)	39 episodes, voice
1996	The Upper Hand	Taxi-driver	Episode: "The Chunnel of Love"
1996	Testament: The Bible in Animation	Jailer Trader (as Tony Jackson)	Episode: "Joseph", voice
1997	Screen Two	Caller	Episode: "Burn Your Phone"
1997	Backup	Talbot	Episode: "Something for the Weekend, Sir?"
1998	The Life of Confucius	Baron Chi Baron 3 Tzeng Tzu	
1998	Mosley	Returning Officer	Episode: "Rules of the Game"
1999	Santa's Last Christmas	The Postbear	Television film, voice
2001	Watership Down	Kehaar	5 episodes, voice
2001	Casualty	Landlord	Episode: "Consequences"
1993–2004	The Bill	Fred Cross George Decker Quayle	3 episodes
2005	Footballers' Wives	Marco	Episode: #4.4
2001–2006	Doctors	Leslie Broughton Mr. Eagles	2 episodes
2006	ChuckleVision	Worthington Kent	Episode: "In a Pickle"

=== Radio ===
Year	Title	Role	Notes
1968	The Hobbit	The Tale Bearer	
1968	The Hard Buy	Zarkas (ep 3 onwards)	
