= Mandog =

1972 British children's TV sci-fi series

- Genre: Fantasy
- Written by: Peter Dickinson
- Directed by: Anna Home; Paul Stone
- Starring: Carol Hazell; Jane Anthony; Adrian Shergold
- Theme music composer: Delia Derbyshire
- Country of origin: United Kingdom
- Original language: English
- No. of series: 1
- No. of episodes: 6

Production
- Producer: Anna Home

Original release
- Network: BBC1
- Release: 3 January – 7 February 1972

Mandog is a 1972 BBC children's television science fiction serial in 6 parts based on the novel Mandog by Peter Dickinson, who adapted the book. It features Ian Sharp, Carol Hazell, and Mollie Sugden and was directed by Anna Home. and Paul Stone.

Viewers would have known the programme as Man Dog, rather than Mandog, on account of its title sequence showing the name as two separate words, with the word "Man" appearing above the word "Dog". Radio Times also listed the programme as Man Dog, in accordance with the two-word name in the television title sequence, and not the one-word name of the original book.

== Plot ==
A group of present-day children become caught up in a conflict between two groups from the future who have come back into the present.

The significance of the title is that the mind of one person of the future is transferred into the family pet dog of one of the children.

== Cast ==
- Jane Anthony as Sammy
- Carol Hazell as Kate
- Adrian Shergold as Duncan
- Ian Sharp as Ian
- Jonathan Hardy as Halmar
- Roy Boyd as Henry
- Derek Martin as Gala One
- Mollie Sugden as Mrs. Morris

== Episodes ==
No.	Title	First broadcast
1	"The Man Who Could Walk Through Doors"	3 January 1972
2	"Mister Makes His Mark"	10 January 1972
3	"There Is No Duncan"	17 January 1972
4	"The Consignment"	24 January 1972
5	"On the Run"	31 January 1972
6	"You Have 30 Seconds"	7 February 1972
