= Joy Whitby =

English television producer and executive

- Born: Joy Whitby; 27 July 1930 (age 96); England
- Education: St Anne's College, Oxford
- Occupations: Television executive; studio manager; television producer; radio producer
- Years active: 1955–?
- Employer: British Broadcasting Corporation (BBC)

Joy Whitby (born 27 July 1930) is an English television executive, television, and radio producer who specialises in children's programmes and animated films.

== Early life ==
Whitby read History at St Anne's College, Oxford, and, after graduating, her first job was as a secretary at the Mayfair Delinquency Clinic. She joined the BBC as a studio manager in 1955 and, a year later, became a producer on Listen with Mother. She moved from radio to television in 1962.

== BBC children's television ==
Whitby was attached to the children's television series Blue Peter, Whitby was commissioned to write an internal BBC report on Watch with Mother; the five pre-filmed series had been on air for a decade. The first Controller of BBC 2, Michael Peacock was aware of the shortage of nursery schools in the country and appointed Whitby to create and produce Play School, a new television series for pre-school children, running Monday to Friday through the year. In developing the series, Whitby consulted teachers, writers and illustrators. Nancy Quayle, an expert on "learning through play", became a permanent consultant and Wendy Duggan provided the many animals featured in Pet's Corner. There were other familiar landmarks like the story telling chair, the dressing up pegs, the revolving clock and three "windows" which led to the outside world through a library of specially made films.

Because of a blackout the previous night, the first edition of Play School inadvertently opened the new BBC 2 service on 21 April 1964. One of its innovations was a rotating team of diverse presenters with as many men as women. According to Samira Ahmed, Whitby found Brian Cant's "unpretentious charm" at his audition ideal for the new show. The presenters were not all English. Paul Danquah is thought to have been the first black presenter of a children's programme. Rick Jones was Canadian and Marla Landi, Italian. Eric Thompson soon adapted and created all the voices for The Magic Roundabout which was based on the French series, Le Manège Enchanté.

Following the success of Play School, Michael Peacock asked Whitby to create a new daily programme at teatime to fill a spare 15 minute slot. The result, Jackanory, created by Whitby with Molly Cox and Anna Home, was launched in 1965. It drew on quality stories from around the world and invited actors, writers, artists and celebrities to present stories that were particularly suitable for them. For example, Sir Compton Mackenzie retold Greek Legends and Margaret Rutherford read five Beatrix Potter tales.

== Commercial television ==
In 1967, Peacock became Managing Director of London Weekend Television. Amongst other BBC executives, he invited Whitby and her boss, Doreen Stephens, the former head of Family Programmes, to join the new franchise contractor. Whitby ran the Children's Department which enabled her to branch out into drama. She produced The Growing Summer, with Wendy Hiller, Knock Three Times with Hattie Jacques, and Catweazle starring Geoffrey Bayldon. In 1969, she resigned along with other heads of department in protest at Michael Peacock's dismissal. She founded her own company, Grasshopper Productions, and in 1970, wrote and produced her first independent film series, Grasshopper Island, for ITV.

In 1975, Whitby joined Yorkshire Television and, during her ten years as Head of Children's Programmes, she created many original programmes. Among these were The Book Tower, with Tom Baker as its first presenter, and an international children's drama series for the European Broadcasting Union (EBU). During this period, she also produced two independent productions, Emma and Grandpa, which she wrote and directed, as well as the television film A Pattern of Roses, which she adapted KM Peyton's ghost story. It featured Helena Bonham Carter in her first screen appearance.

Since 1985, Whitby has focused on making animated films based on quality picture books. These include five-minute episodes of the Mouse and Mole series for the BBC, voiced by Richard Briers and Alan Bennett, later to be joined by Imelda Staunton for a Christmas special. Other titles include The Mousehole Cat, The Angel and the Soldier Boy, A Small Miracle, and East of the Moon (based on one of Terry Jones Fairy Tales).

Whitby attended the National Trust's Advisory Panel for Youth, sat on the Board of the Unicorn Theatre and was a member of the first Board of the Channel Four Television Corporation. Her awards include a BAFTA for Play School, a Prix Jeunesse for The Book Tower, and an ACE Award for The Angel and the Soldier Boy. In 1979, she won the Eleanor Farjeon Award for services to Children's Books.

== Personal life ==
In 1954, she married Tony Whitby, who died in 1975, when he was Controller of BBC Radio 4. Joy Whitby has three sons and eight grandchildren.
