= The Coral Island (TV series) =

Children's television series

- Genre: adventure
- Written by: James Andrew Hall
- Directed by: Chris Thomson; Ray Brown; Ray Alchin
- Starring: Nicholas Bond-Owen; Gerard Kennedy
- Composer: Bruce Smeaton
- Countries of origin: Australia; United Kingdom
- Original language: English
- No. of episodes: 4

Production
- Running time: 40 mins

Original release
- Network: ABC
- Release: 1983

The Coral Island is a children's television series, adapted from the 19th-century novel The Coral Island by Scottish author R. M. Ballantyne. The series of 4 episodes was a joint production of the Australian Broadcasting Corporation and Thames Television. It was filmed on location in the western Samoan village of Salamumu and then on the Whitsunday Islands off the Queensland coast in 1981.

The series was first broadcast in Australia on ABC-TV on 6 January 1983.

== Plot ==
The story, set in 1840, centres on 3 boys from Australia and their struggle for survival when they are shipwrecked on a remote Pacific island. Jack (played by Scott McGregor), Peterkin (played by Nicholas Bond-Owen) and Ralph (played by Richard Gibson) must learn to survive on their own on the island, despite their very different characters and backgrounds. After befriending two natives on the island, they are rescued by an English missionary, and the three boys return to Australia.

== Cast ==
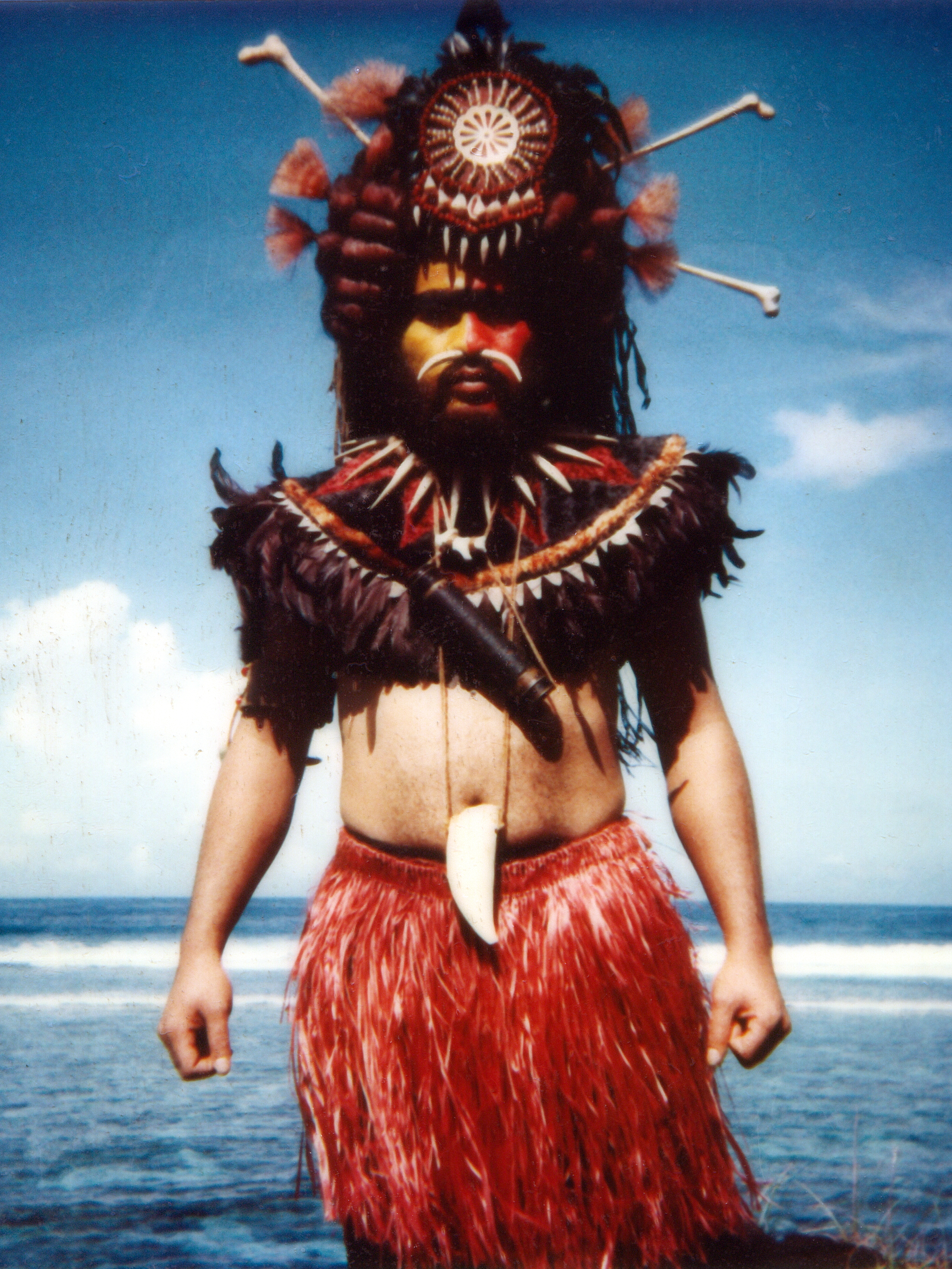
Uelese Petaia as the native, Tararo

- Nicholas Bond-Owen as Peterkin
- Richard Gibson as Ralph
- Scott McGregor as Jack
- Gerard Kennedy as Bloody Bill
- Brian McDermott as Captain Carver
- Uelese Petaia as Tararo
- Pele Teuila as Avatea
- Peter Collingwood as Reverend McNab
- Charles 'Bud' Tingwell as Sir Charles Rover
- Lyn James as Lady Rover
- Danny Adcock as Ted Salter
