= Grasshopper Island =

1971 British children's TV series

- Genre: Children's
- Created by: Joy Whitby
- Narrated by: Keith Dewhurst
- Theme music composer: Wilfred Josephs
- Country of origin: United Kingdom
- Original language: English
- No. of series: 1
- No. of episodes: 12

Production
- Producers: Joy Whitby, Doreen Stephens
- Production location: Corsica

Original release
- Network: ITV
- Release: 1971

Grasshopper Island is a British television serial for children created by Joy Whitby. It was first broadcast in 1971. It was filmed on location in London, Milford Haven and Corsica.

== Premise ==
The series centres on three brothers, nicknamed Toughy (wants to be a soldier), Smarty (clever), and Mouse (likes cheese). Their real names are not revealed. Presumably orphaned (their parents are never seen or mentioned), they have lived with a succession of different people – 'some nice and some nasty, but no-one who they liked in particular'. Being boisterous, adventurous and imaginative, they are regularly in trouble and consequently resent their situation. Eventually they decide to run away to sea. After escaping, they hitch a ride courtesy of the bizarre Elderly Boy in his converted lifeboat. They eventually arrive on an apparently uninhabited island, where the Elderly Boy abandons them, and they set up home. After a while they discover that the island is home to the eccentric grasshopper expert Cornelius Button and his feisty housekeeper Lupus. After making friends with their new neighbours, they join forces with them to defeat the unsavoury Doctor Hopper, who wants to destroy Button's reputation and seize Grasshopper Island. Afterwards, they decide to stay on Grasshopper Island permanently.

== Characters ==
Smarty (Max Whitby) The cleverest of the three brothers, so named because 'he always had answers to all sorts of questions'. His elaborate plans are not always needed, as simpler ones are often pursued by the others.

Toughy (Timothy Whitby) So-called because 'he wanted to be a soldier'. He is an avid reader and is very creative, being adept at painting and drawing.

Mouse (Nicholas Whitby) So-called because 'he liked cheese'. He loves hats, usually sporting more than one in each episode.

Cornelius Button (Julian Orchard) An eccentric grasshopper expert who has lived on Grasshopper Island for many years. He spends all his time obsessively studying the grasshoppers and trying to avoid being ordered around by Lupus. Many years ago, he discovered a rare grasshopper which was named the "Button's Blue" in his honour. He was also given Grasshopper Island by way of reward, and when the villainous Dr Hopper tries to have him removed, he must find another Button's Blue to keep his tenure. Button also has a sister called Amelia who is the headmistress of a girls' school and sometimes visits him. He dreads these occasions and will do anything he can to prevent them (including pretending to be a cannibal).

Lupus (Patricia Hayes) Cornelius Button's formidable housekeeper, who has lived with him for 20 years. Even though she is Button's employee, he is often intimidated by her into doing tasks such as taking out the rubbish. Despite this, her brisk manner hides a softer side, and she is genuinely fond of Button and the boys.

Dr Hopper (Frank Muir) A longstanding professional enemy of Cornelius Button, who concocts a scheme to have him expelled from Grasshopper Island (which naturally would then go to Hopper) unless he finds another Button's Blue, the existence of which Hopper does not believe in. He drives a pedalo and arrives at the island in the last episode, although Toughy, Smarty and Mouse soon succeed in frightening him away.

The Elderly Boy (Charles Hawtrey) The owner of the converted lifeboat who gives the boys a lift to the island. He owns a pet dove called Cecil. He initially wants to stay with the boys, but soon leaves after finding the environment too hot and the terrain too taxing.

The Voices of Authority (all played by Tim Brooke-Taylor) A succession of overbearing (and mostly unpleasant) characters known to Toughy, Smarty and Mouse before they leave home. They include a businessman who shouts at them for making too much noise, a matronly woman who forbids Toughy to talk with his mouth full, a barber who gives a reluctant Smarty a short back and sides because 'curls is for girls' and a grumpy taxi-driver who drives them to the docks.

== Episodes ==
No.	Title
1	"Escape"
After becoming tired of a world full of grown-ups telling them what to do, Toughy, Smarty and Mouse decide to escape from their dreary city home in a converted lifeboat owned by the Elderly Boy.
2	"The Elderly Boy"
After a long voyage, the lifeboat arrives at Grasshopper Island, though the Elderly Boy departs after deciding that the island is too lacking in comforts.
3	"Supplies"
Having settled into an abandoned hut, the boys search for food. Smarty's fishing rod doesn't work, though Mouse has more success with snail-hunting. After glumly contemplating a diet of snails, they discover a hidden cupboard full of food.
4	"Beds don't grow on Trees"
Toughy, Smarty and Mouse are finding it hard to manage with just one bed and decide to make some new ones.
5	"The Egg Tree"
The boys' staple diet of biscuits is running out. Mouse wants to find an egg tree whilst Smarty attempts to catch frogs. Eventually, success comes when they catch a chick— which then eats all the remaining biscuits.
6	"Strangers"
After a month on Grasshopper Island, Mouse demands proof that it actually is an island. Meanwhile, we are introduced to the grasshopper expert Cornelius Button and his housekeeper Lupus, who are harvesting their apricots.
7	"Cheese"
After 1.5 months on Grasshopper Island, Toughy, Smarty and Mouse search for buried treasure. Meanwhile, Lupus (who has an affliction to cheese), forbids Cornelius Button (who loves it) to keep it on the island.
8	"The Big House"
Toughy, Smarty and Mouse make themselves a map of the island and inadvertently discover Cornelius Button's house.
9	"Discovery"
Cornelius Button's formidable headmistress sister threatens to visit with her pupils because 'too much study has made them stupid'. Horrified at this prospect, Cornelius Button writes a letter to his sister saying that he now eats children. Unfortunately, Toughy Smarty and Mouse overhear this and believe that the people in the Big House are cannibals. Soon after, Lupus discovers them by accident.
10	"Grasshopper Wine"
Having befriended the boys, Lupus has been secretly visiting them. Cornelius Button misinterprets this and believes that she is ill and takes her away for a holiday. Whilst they are gone, Toughy, Smarty and Mouse try making wine using an old recipe book, but after it has fermented, they do not like the taste, so Lupus gives it to Cornelius Button (who enjoys it).
11	"Rescue"
Toughy and Smarty have invented 'grasshopper tennis' (similar to volleyball), but whilst they play, Mouse floats out to sea on an old oil drum. Cornelius Button finally becomes aware of them when he rescues Mouse.
12	"Button's Blue"
The unpleasant Dr Hopper arrives with a threat that unless Cornelius Button can find another Button's Blue grasshopper, he will take over the island. Toughy, Smarty and Mouse ambush Dr Hopper and drive him away, before realising that a grasshopper which they caught earlier is the sought-after Button's Blue. After the danger has passed, the three boys decide to stay permanently on the island.

== Availability ==
The series has been available on DVD by Grasshopper Productions (Whitby's own company) since 2008.
