= Zokko! =

British children's TV series (1968–1970)

- Voices of: Sheelagh Mcgrath, Gordon Clyde, Anthony Jackson
- Narrated by: Mr Zokko!
- Country of origin: United Kingdom
- No. of episodes: 26

Production
- Executive producers: Paul Ciani and Molly Cox
- Running time: 22 minutes

Original release
- Network: BBC
- Release: 2 November 1968 – 28 February 1970

Zokko! is a BBC television programme for children that ran for twenty-six twenty-two-minutes episodes between 1968 and 1970. It was devised by newcomer Paul Ciani and veteran children's TV producer Molly Cox and was ground-breaking in being the first children's "television comic".

== Description ==
It featured a mixture of animations (e.g. Disney 'Fantasia' highlights/'Felix the Cat'/specially made sequences by Ted Lewis and Malcom Draper) and music hall jokes ('Knock-Knock' etc.). Viewers were asked to send in their own jokes. The programme used short sequences using models set to music (e.g. marching band using World War I song "I'll Make a Man of You" with General Kitchener poster in background, and a rotating carousel packed with brass instruments), studio variety acts ('Sensational feats on the slack wire by Babu'/'Anna-Lou and Maria: a feather and fur fantasy'/'The Breathtaking Eddy Limbo'/'The High Jacks'/'Rope-spinning by Robin and Toni Templar'), film clips (e.g. specially made short films of a Tarzan spoof/snake charmer/imported stunt films 'Speed Ride' (rollercoaster/racing car stunts), magic (Ali Bongo - the "Shriek of Araby"), narrated comic strips (Big top thriller 'Susan Starr of the Circus'/Sci-Fi adventure 'Skayn and the Moon People' - pictures by Leslie Caswell), and specially shot films using pop songs ('Soundbox') by the likes of Georgie Fame, Alan Price, Harpers Bizarre, Randy Newman ("Simon Smith and the Amazing Dancing Bear"). The show was named after its original 'presenter', a flashing/talking pinball machine called 'Mr Zokko!' with a gaping skull shaped head (designed by Mike Ellis, the father of Blue Peter presenter Janet Ellis, and grandfather of singer Sophie Ellis-Bextor) which introduced the clips and then scored them in its slow and sad robotic voice e.g. "Zok-ko, Score Fif-teen".

The programme is now regarded as "the first televised children's comic". Apart from a compilation of highlights, only two complete episodes remain in the BBC's archives, both from the second series. These episodes were Season 2 episode 5 (3 January 1970) and Season 2 episode 13 (28 February 1970), the latter being the final edition, and episode 5 being the first episode to be broadcast in the 1970s. Both series’ were made in black and white. The second series omitted the pinball machine links, which were replaced by pop-art captions heavy on exclamation marks and question marks, linked with a similar electronically treated voice; "All for fun - fun for all - it's Zokko!" The main title theme was music by Brian Fahey and was released as a single, under the name Zokko's Band.

Try Again Jonah! was also a feature on the show.
