= Kevin Wilson (actor) =

New Zealand born actor

- Born: New Zealand
- Occupation: Actor
- Years active: 1972-1989

Kevin Wilson was a New Zealand born actor who worked Australia. He featured in TV series Class of '74 as John Ward, the school boxing champion, The People Next Door as 19-year-old son Martin, and Alpha Scorpio as lead character Stephen Lee. He appeared in The Cousin from Fiji as Darky Tyrell The Bushranger as Dermot Reilly, and played Les Darcy in the Behind the Legend episode on Darcy.

Born in New Zealand, Wilson came to Australia in 1971 as a boxer and appeared on a TV boxing show before becoming a TV stuntman, first appearing as an extra on Spyforce. He took acting lessons with Brian Syron and moved into acting.
