= Watch This Space =

- Genre: Children's science fiction
- Written by: Mike Meade
- Starring: Paul Chubb; Ron Blanchard
- Country of origin: Australia
- Original language: English
- No. of seasons: 1
- No. of episodes: 13

Production
- Running time: 30 mins.

Original release
- Network: ABC
- Release: 7 April – 30 June 1982

Watch This Space is an Australian children's science fiction television series which ran on the Australian Broadcasting Corporation from 7 April to 13 June 1982.

The show starred Paul Chubb, in his first leading role on a television series, as a red-skinned alien named Rufus who arrives on Earth and attempts to break into show business. The alien is helped by a local man, played by co-star Ron Blanchard, who attempts to help him fit in including helping disguise his spaceship as a normal home and later moved in with him as a roommate.

Being largely unaware of Earth culture, the alien would regularly become involved in comical social situations. This was most often at his human friend's expense who, while receiving weekly visitors, continually tries to explain away his odd behaviour and the existence of his talking shipboard computer. Other actors who appeared on the series included local bands, performers and celebrity guest stars such as Steve Bisley, Liddy Clark, Jon English, Rebecca Gilling, Tracy Mann and Kris McQuade.

Apart from Paul Chubb, actors used their own names for the characters they played.

== Cast ==
- Paul Chubb as Rufus
- Ron Blanchard as Ron
- Steve Bisley as Steve
- Liddy Clark as Liddy
- Jon English as Jon
- Rebecca Gilling as Rebecca
- Tracy Mann as Tracy
- Kris McQuade as Kris
- Graeme Blundell as Graeme
- The Amazing Orchante as Himself
