= Ron Blanchard =

Australian actor

- Born: Ronald Blanchard; 1945 (age 80–81); Australia
- Occupations: Theatre, television and film actor
- Years active: 1957–present
- Known for: Character actor, and for his starring roles in five popular children's television series

Ronald Blanchard (born 1945) is an Australian stage, television and film actor and playwright.

He is best known as a character actor, and for his starring roles in five popular children's television series Breakfast-a-Go-Go, The Lost Islands, Alexander Bunyip's Billabong, Watch This Space and Professor Poopsnagle's Steam Zeppelin.

Blanchard had numerous appearances on television series and films from the late 1960s up until the late 1990s, most especially, his recurring guest role as Lenny Sawyer on A Country Practice but has since returned to theatre work. He made his film debut in a supporting role in Caddie in 1976 and appeared in the 1997 film Oscar and Lucinda.

== Biography ==
Blanchard got his start in theatre in a production of MacBeth in 1957 and his first big break on the small screen when he appeared on the children's variety show Breakfast-a-Go-Go in 1969 as 'Witless Wonder', the comedic sidekick of new host Sue Smith. In 1972 he appeared as a guest star on the soap opera Number 96 and on the comedy series Snake Gully with Dad and Dave.

He continued working on-and-off for the next several years and, in 1976, Blanchard landed the part of the villainous Quell on the children's adventure series The Lost Islands. As one of the show's main antagonists, the series provided his breakout role.

As well as appearing on The Outsiders, in the same year he also made his film debut with a supporting role in Caddie. He followed this with appearances on The Garry McDonald Show (1977), Alexander Bunyip's Billabong (1978), Doctor Down Under (1979) and, most notably, co-starring with Paul Chubb in the children's science fiction series Watch This Space (1982). He began to work more regularly during the early 1980s and had parts in the television movie Chase Through the Night (1983), miniseries The Last Bastion (1984) and films Silver City (1984), Warming Up (1985) and Burke & Wills (1985).

In January 1986, he joined former co-star Paul Chubb and Perry Quinton in a pantomime called Humpty Dumpty. It featured the fictional characters of the Harry and Ralph Show at the Footbridge Theatre. In the same year, he starred in yet another children's television series, the popular but short-lived Professor Poopsnagle's Steam Zeppelin. After a supporting role in the thriller film Dark Age (1987), he returned to television acting with guest appearances in Mother and Son (1988), True Believers (1988) and G.P. (1991). That same year, he also had a minor role in the action film Gotcha (1991).

Beginning in 1992, Blanchard had a recurring role as Lenny Sawyer on the television series A Country Practice. His last regular acting role was in the film Country Life (1994), although he made appearances in the television movie Hart to Hart: Harts in High Season (1996) and the romance film Oscar and Lucinda (1997).

For the past 12 years, he has been travelling the world playing the role of an English butler for the famous Swedish illusionist Joe Labero.

== Selected filmography ==
=== Film ===
Production	Year	Role	Type
Caddie	1976	Bill	Feature film
Chase Through the Night	1982	Mert	TV movie
Silver City	1984	Arthur Calwell	Feature film
Burke & Wills	1985	Bill Patton	Feature film
Warming Up	1986	Len	Feature film
Dark Age	1987	Bluey Noakes	Feature film
Rock 'N' Roll Cowboys	1987	Uncle Sam	TV movie
Gotcha	1991	Tuba Player	TV short film
Country Life	1994	Wally Wells	Feature film
Hart to Hart: Harts in High Season	1996		TV movie
Oscar and Lucinda	1997	Steamer Captain	Feature film

=== Television ===
Production	Year	Role	Type
Breakfast-a-Go-Go	1969	Witless Wonder	TV series
Snake Gully with Dad and Dave	1972	Doug Creedy	TV series, episode: "Hold that Tiger"
Number 96	1973	Dennis Parker	TV series
Certain Women	1974		TV series, 1 episode
Alvin Purple	1976	Curly	TV series
The Outsiders	1976	Hannan	TV series, episode: "Ghost Town"
The Lost Islands	1976	Quell	TV series, 26 episodes
The Garry McDonald Show	1977	Various	TV series
Alexander Bunyip's Billabong	1978-88	Ron	TV series
Doctor Down Under	1979	First Wardsman	TV series, episode "Identity Crisis"
Tickled Pink	1981		TV series, episode: "Three Blind Mice"
Watch This Space	1982	Ron	TV series
The Last Bastion	1984	Arthur	TV miniseries
Professor Poopsnaggle and His Flying Zeppelin	1985	Murk	TV series, 24 episodes
Mother and Son	1988	Emile the fridge repairman	TV series, episode "The Fridge"
True Believers	1988	Arthur Calwell	TV miniseries, episodes
Rafferty's Rules	1991	Jones Worthington	TV series, episode "Best and Brightest"
G.P.	1991	Ron Slater	TV series
A Country Practice	1985	Kevin Crooke	TV series, 4 episodes
A Country Practice	1992-93	Norman Leonard "Lennie" Sawyer	TV series, 12 episodes
Home and Away	1989-93	Athletic Official, Peter Braithwaite	TV series
