= Molly Cox =

British television producer (1925–1991)

- Born: Marie-Thérèse Henriette Cunningham; 19 October 1925; Istanbul
- Died: 3 November 1991 (aged 66); Royal Brompton Hospital, England
- Occupation: TV producer
- Employer: BBC
- Known for: Developing children's series Play School with Joy Whitby

"Molly" Cox born Marie-Thérèse Henriette Cunningham became Marie-Thérèse Henriette Cox (19 October 1925 – 3 November 1991) was a British television producer for BBC children TV. Her successes include Play School, Zokko! and Jackanory.

== Life ==
Cox was born in Istanbul in 1925. Her parents, Aileen Turner and Arthur Joseph Cunningham, were living in Turkey. They moved to Alexandria when their father left his job at Lloyds and became the editor of the Egyptian Gazette.

She joined the BBC in 1942 and trained to be a sound engineer on a course that was otherwise taken entirely by male employees. She creating the sound effects for the radio serial Dick Barton. She married and left the BBC as she became the mother of two sons. She returned in 1962 after her husband, Charles Terence "Terry" Cox, died. After a spell on radio, she joined the Blue Peter team.

She worked for Joy Whitby and they developed the children's TV series Play School which was the first programme shown on the new channel BBC2.

She was involved in the creation of Jackanory with Anna Home. where actors would read a story supported by pictures. The simple format required the best graphics, the best stories and the best readers. The programme began its run in 1965. "At first people were unwilling to participate in this unknown programme", Anna Home recalled in 1997. "But when actors realised it was the opportunity to have 15 minutes' solo experience on television, they began to queue up to get on it, and having done a Jackanory became a bit like having done your Desert Island Discs."

Cox and Paul Ciani created a new TV programme name Zokko!. It is regarded as the first children's "television comic". It ran on Saturday mornings for 26 episodes between 1968 and 1970. In 1975 she co-wrote book 'Fabulous Animals' with David Attenborough based on crypto-zoology TV series of same name which she had produced.

She was a strong supporter of BBC children's programmes and she objected strongly to the BBC buying the rights to the US produced Sesame Street. The programme had many admirers but Cox knew that important programmes such as Play School would need to be sacrificed if the BBC was to pay the large fee to license the programme for broadcast in the UK.

Cox died in the Royal Brompton Hospital at the age of 66.
