= Tony Whitby =

- Born: Anthony Charles Whitby; 19 November 1929; Mere, Wiltshire, England
- Died: 25 February 1975 (aged 45); Kensington, Greater London, England
- Other name: Tony Lesser
- Education: Bristol Cathedral School
- Alma mater: St Edmund Hall, Oxford
- Spouse: Joy Field Whitby (m. 1954)

Anthony Charles Whitby (19 November 1929 – 25 February 1975) was a British BBC Radio producer and television current affairs editor who was Controller of BBC Radio 4 from 1970 to 1975.

== Early life and education ==
Whitby was born in Mere, Wiltshire and was educated at Bristol Cathedral School, where he won a scholarship to St Edmund Hall, Oxford. There he wrote a thesis on Matthew Arnold.

== Career ==
Whitby began his career as a civil servant in the Civil Service from 1954 to 1959, working in the Colonial Office.

Whitby joined the BBC as a radio producer on At Home and Abroad in the 1950s. In 1961, Whitby transferred to television as a studio director of Panorama, and later an editor on Gallery, Tonight and 24 Hours. Whitby was Secretary of the BBC, before his appointment as Controller of Radio 4 in 1969, taking up the post in January 1970. In this post, he gained a reputation for shrewdly picking out the ideas of others and embellishing them by adding his own thoughts and suggestions. He had no intention of creating a new schedule from scratch, but he wanted a more topical and a more varied flavour - to make Radio 4, in his words, like a "well-labelled library that has a few surprises in it". So, in 1970, along came the unashamedly serious Analysis and the magisterial World Tonight, the bright and breezy 'commuter magazine' PM Reports and a phone-in called It's Your Line, the satirical sketch-show Week Ending, and the consumer magazine You and Yours. In 1972, Whitby commissioned the first series of I’m Sorry I Haven’t a Clue and in 1973 Kaleidoscope. In 2010, David Hendy, lecturer in broadcasting history at the University of Westminster, said:

"Looking back, what's most striking about Whitby's revolution of 1970 is how genuinely eclectic it made Radio 4, with programmes stretching across a suddenly wider spectrum, from the intellectually demanding or disturbing at one end to the faintly scurrilous or comforting at the other. The changes 40 years ago set Radio 4 on its long-term trajectory: away from the dusty tones of the somewhat middlebrow old Home Service, to the tougher, livelier, more authoritative, network we have today".

Whitby also wrote several plays under the pseudonym Tony Lesser.

His wife was Joy Whitby, known for her work in children's television.

He died at age 45, after a long illness.
