= Alan Dargin =

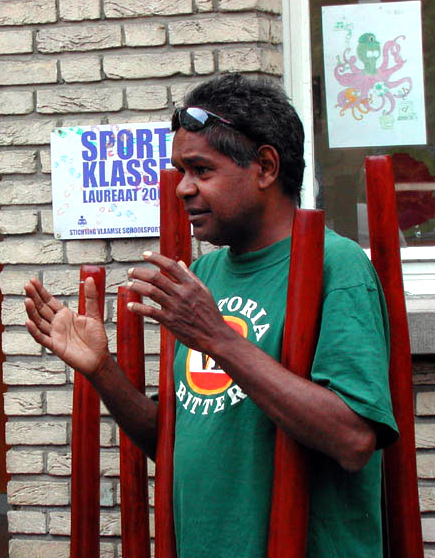
- Alan Dargin in 2003

Background information
- Born: Alan William Dargin; 13 July 1967; Wee Waa, New South Wales, Australia
- Died: 24 February 2008 (aged 40) Darlinghurst, New South Wales, Australia
- Genre: Indigenous Australian
- Occupations: Musician, actor
- Instrument: Didgeridoo

Alan Dargin (13 July 1967 – 24 February 2008) was an indigenous Australian musician and songwriter known for being a didgeridoo player. He grew up in Wee Waa and started learning the instrument at age five from his grandfather and other Wiradjuri elders. His signature instrument was over a hundred years old and was made from a blood wood eucalypt. He received his secondary education at St Pius X High School, Newcastle.

Dargin worked as a busker on the streets of Sydney. He appeared with various symphony orchestras, including the Vienna Philharmonic and the London Symphony Orchestra at Royal Albert Hall; as well as in the United States, Japan, and Europe.

In 1983 Dargin appeared in a five-part ABC-TV miniseries, Chase Through the Night, alongside Nicole Kidman. He had the role of Bruce in the feature film, The Fringe Dwellers (1986), and a cameo appearance in The Adventures of Priscilla: Queen of the Desert (1994), as an Aboriginal man who joins the drag artists in a performance. On Bastille Day in 1994 he performed for the French President, François Mitterrand.

He has contributed to albums by other artists: Jimmy Page and Robert Plant, Jimmy Barnes, Tommy Emmanuel, Wallis Buchanan (Jamiroquai), Yothu Yindi, Alison Brown and Don Burrows, and filmed a documentary about Cape York with Jacques Cousteau.

Dargin's last recording, MRD, contains tracks that feature collaborations with musicians: Tommy Emmanuel, James Morrison, supplying didgeridoo in duet with other instruments: guitar, steel drums, keyboard, Chinese flute, trumpet, electric bass, and voice. The album was released in April 2008. Dargin held a degree in science from the University of Toronto.

Dargin was diagnosed with burst veins in his throat and was warned by doctors that continued playing of the didgeridoo to generate a "fast, complex and loud sound" in "his forceful style" could endanger his life. In mid-February 2008 he was admitted to Saint Vincent's Hospital, Darlinghurst, and died of a cerebral haemorrhage on 24 February 2008.

A memorial service was held at Circular Quay on 28 February in that year, commencing with a traditional Aboriginal smoking ceremony that progressed along the quay to First Fleet Park. Hundreds attended and tributes were given by friends and relatives for the inventor of "Rock and Roll didjeridu".

== Discography ==
- Bloodwood: The Art of the Didjeridu (by Alan Dargin and Michael Atherton) (1993)
- Two Stories in One (by Alan Dargin and Reconciliation) (July 1994)
- Cross + Hatch (by Dargin and Atherton) (March 1998)
- DidgeriDuo (by Alan Dargin and Gary 'The DidgeMan' Thomas) (2001) Aquarius International Music
- MRD (April 2008)
