= The Aussie Property Flippers =

Australian television series

- Genre: Lifestyle; Renovation
- Country of origin: Australia
- Original language: English
- No. of seasons: 1
- No. of episodes: 8

Original release
- Network: Seven Network
- Release: 26 April – 26 June 2017

The Aussie Property Flippers is an Australian lifestyle/home renovating television series on the Seven Network. The series was commissioned in October 2016 and began airing on 26 April 2017. The series follows a number of people "flipping" properties which involves buying, renovating and selling property to make a quick profit.

== Episodes ==
No.	Title	Original release date	Australian viewers
1	"Episode 1"	26 April 2017	592,000
2	"Episode 2"	3 May 2017	531,000
3	"Episode 3"	10 May 2017	423,000
4	"Episode 4"	17 May 2017	568,000
5	"Episode 5"	24 May 2017	544,000
6	"Episode 6"	31 May 2017^{[a]} 1 June 2017^{[b]}	287,000^{[a]} 174,000^{[b]}
7	"Episode 7"	31 May 2017^{[a]} 1 June 2017^{[b]}	183,000^{[a]} 100,000^{[b]}
8	"Episode 8"	26 June 2017	237,000

== See also ==
- Changing Rooms
- Room for Improvement
- The Block
- House Rules

== Notes ==
- ^{a} Melbourne, Adelaide & Perth only
- ^{b} Sydney & Brisbane only
