= Chase Through the Night =

- Directed by: Howard Rubie
- Written by: Rob George; John Emery
- Based on: novel by Max Fatchen
- Produced by: Jim George
- Starring: Ron Blanchard; Brett Climo; John Jarratt; Nicole Kidman; Steve Dodd
- Production company: ABC-Independent Productions
- Release date: 1984
- Running time: 5 × 30 mins
- Country: Australia
- Language: English

Chase Through the Night is a 1984 Australian film about a gang of bank robbers on the run. It was a five-part, 30-minute teleseries.

The film is based on a book of the same name by Max Fatchen. The story is set in the Queensland outback. The movie was filmed in and around the town of Kaimkillenbun in Queensland.

== Cast ==
- Ron Blanchard as Mert
- Brett Climo as Ray
- John Jarratt as Clurry
- Nicole Kidman as Petra
- Steve Dodd as Narli
- Jeff Truman as Eric
- Lyn Collingwood as Mrs. Y
- Paul Sonkkila as Darby
- Scott McGregor as Yorkie
- Alan Dargin as Bindaree
