= James Davern =

Australian television producer (1933–2023)

James Edmund Davern OAM
- James Davern creator of A Country Practice (TV series) receiving the Media Peace Prize
- Born: James Edmund Davern; 21 February 1933; Belgrave, Victoria, Australia
- Died: 18 November 2023 (aged 90); Australia
- Occupations: Director; producer; writer; script editor; production company founder
- Years active: early 1960s-?
- Known for: A Country Practice as creator and producer
- Notable work: Bellbird
- Spouse: Philippa Davern (m. 1964)
- Children: 3, including: Pat Davern
- Awards: Order of Australia, Logie Hall of Fame

James Edmund Davern OAM (21 February 1933 – 18 November 2023) was an Australian television producer, director, script/screenwriter and editor and founder of production company JNP Productions. He is arguably best known for creating the long-running Australian soap /serial A Country Practice.

== Professional career ==
Davern was employed as a writer and script editor with the Australian Broadcasting Corporation (ABC) television branch in the 1960s. He worked as a producer and director in drama and music programmes and was involved in establishing a script production line.

In 1967, Davern was director and producer of the very first episode of Bellbird, Australia's first successful television soap opera, set in a rural community.

Davern moved to the Seven Network, where he created the highly popular series A Country Practice, one of the most popular drama series in Australian television history. The series ran from 1981 to 1993 with 1,058 episodes. When the Seven Network cancelled A Country Practice in 1993, it was remade by Network 10 in 1994. James Davern moved to Network 10 to work on the "new" series. It was not a success and was cancelled after 30 episodes.

Davern wrote episodes for Homicide, Alpha Scorpio, Rush, Patrol Boat, A Country Practice, and Warming Up. As producer or executive producer, he worked on shows such as Rush, Alpha Scorpio, Barnaby and Me, No Room to Run, Patrol Boat, A Country Practice, Queen of the Road, Warming Up, Hector's Bunyip, Land of Hope, Whipping Boy, The Hostages, Reprisal, Without Warning.

== Awards and honours ==
Davern was nominated for a production award at the Television Society of Australia Awards in 1970, for his work on Bellbird. However, he lost to Eric Taylor for ABC TV drama series Australian Playhouse.

Davern was inducted into the Logies Hall of Fame in 1991 in recognition of his service to and influence on Australian television.

In 2014, Davern received an Order of Australia Medal (OAM) for service to television as a writer, director and producer.

== Personal life and death ==
James Davern was born one of four children to Edmund and Eva Davern; his father died from an illness having served as a soldier in Papua New Guinea. He met his wife Philippa (née Haesler) while they were both working at the ABC in the early 1960s. They married in 1964 and had three children, Sophie Allen, Anna Davern and Pat Davern, a musician

James was an avid yachtsman and sailed regularly with the Sydney Amateur Sailing Club. He competed in multiple Sydney to Hobart Yacht Races.

In the 1990s James and Philippa bought a vineyard in the Hunter Valley and named it Wandin Valley Estate after the fictional town featured in A Country Practice.

Davern died on 18 November 2023, aged 90.

== Further information ==
Moran, Albert (interviewer). "James Davern: Interviewed by Albert Moran." ScreenSound Australia: National Film and Sound Archive Oral History - Television collection. Record No: 273689
