= Scott McGregor (television presenter) =

Australian television presenter and actor

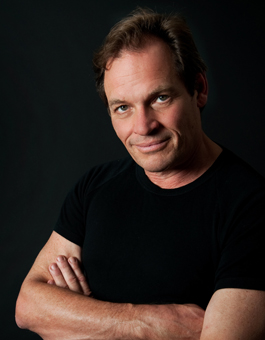
- Born: 22 October 1957 (age 68); Orange, New South Wales, Australia
- Occupations: Actor, television presenter
- Children: 2

Scott McGregor (born 22 October 1957) is an Australian actor and television presenter.

== Early life ==
Scott McGregor was born in Orange, New South Wales where his parents Douglas and Joyce McGregor owned a farm and managed The Central Western Daily newspaper. In 1969 the family moved to Mudgee when his parents purchased the Mudgee Guardian.

Scott was educated at Mudgee High School and The Scots College in Sydney. He commenced studying communications at the then Mitchell College of Advanced Education in Bathurst. Now part of Charles Sturt University, before being accepted into the National Institute of Dramatic Art where he graduated in 1979.

== Career ==
=== Stage ===
In the 1980s McGregor had leading stage acting roles in productions of the Perth Playhouse, Queensland Theatre Company, Marian Street Theatre and Nimrod Theatre Company.

=== Television ===
From 1980 to early 2000s McGregor had acting roles in many Australian television series including The Young Doctors, Skyways, The Sullivans, Cop Shop, A Country Practice, Sons and Daughters, Police Rescue, Home and Away, Water Rats and All Saints.

During the 1980s he had lead roles in the epic ABC mini-series 1915, the Coral Island and Chase Through the Night and was nominated for the best actor award in the 1983 Logies for his role as Walter Gilchrist in 1915. He had numerous film and radio appearances and was one of the Bouncers in the highly successful national tour of the play of the same name in 1985/86.

=== Presenting ===
From the 1997 McGregor turned to presenting lifestyle television as a travel and collectables presenter on The Lifestyle Channel programs Out and About, Australian Living and Australian Collections. From 2000 to 2003 he was a DIY presenter on Better Homes and Gardens and from 2002 to 2004 hosted the home renovation series Room for Improvement on the Seven Network.

In 1999 he combined television presenting with his interest in railways by hosting the travel series Railway Adventures Across Australia for Channel 10. In 2004 he followed up with the series Down The Line with Scott McGregor covering railway journeys in Australia, New Zealand and Vietnam. Both series have sold extensively in markets around the world and have had enormously successful video and DVD releases.

In 2005 McGregor presented Australian Icon Towns made for The History Channel. A second series was broadcast from January 2007.

=== Books ===
McGregor is also a published author, having written two books: 'Fix It: How to Do All Those Little Repair Jobs Around Your Home' (2007) And 'Big Boys' Toys: Blokes and their Magnificent Obsessions' (2008).

== Interest in railways ==
McGregor had a keen interest in railways since childhood. From the 1980s he started collecting railway memorabilia, including several vintage railway carriages which he restored on his property, 'Ruwenzori', near Mudgee NSW. By 1989 he had collected so much he decided to sell some and opened a stall called 'Off The Rails' at the now closed 'Chelsea House' antiques emporium in Camperdown, New South Wales. Branches were later opened at Sydney's Central Railway Station and in Balmain. In 1992 a new 'Off The Rails' shop was opened in Newtown. It moved again to a larger shop and restoration workshop at Camperdown.

In 2005 McGregor opened his country property as tourist accommodation. 'Ruwenzori Retreat' is perched on the Great Dividing Range, north of Mudgee and is made up of a collection of 9 vintage carriages (a number of which date back to the 1890s), with the 3 main carriages restored as the luxury guest accommodation. The 50 acre property also has station buildings, track, signals, a plethora of memorabilia and a network of bush tracks.

Ruwenzori Retreat has featured on TV programs such Getaway, Today, World's Most Extreme Homes, Bricks and Mortar and many others. McGregor and his Ruwenzori railway collection have also appeared on the ABC TV program Collectors.

McGregor now runs a railway tour business, 'Railway Adventures' which he founded in 2012.

== Filmography ==
=== Film ===
Year	Title	Role	Type
1983	Chase Through the Night	Yorkie	TV movie
1995	Mighty Morphin Power Rangers: The Movie	Security Guard	Feature film
2002	The Nugget	Derek McLeod	Feature film

=== Television ===
Year	Title	Role	Type
	The Young Doctors		TV series
	Skyways		TV series
1980–1981	Cop Shop	Constable Stephen Waters	TV series, 7 episodes
1981	The Sullivans	Jerry Halpern	TV series, 2 episodes
1981; 1982; 1986; 1992	A Country Practice	Brett Hill / Paul Higgins / Ray Wallace / Peter Gleeson	TV series, 9 episodes
1982	1915	Walter Gilchrist	Miniseries, 7 episodes
1983	The Coral Island	Jack	Miniseries, 9 episodes
1983	Carson's Law	Ron	TV series, 2 episodes
1984–1985	Sons and Daughters	Robin Elliott	TV series, 34 episodes
1985–86	Five Mile Creek	Edward Armstrong	TV series, 6 episodes
1988	True Believers	Jim Comerford	Miniseries, 4 episodes
1991	Heroes II: The Return	Corporal Claire Stewart	TV series, 2 episodes
1993	Police Rescue	Det Sgt Tony Wilson	TV series
1994	The Ferals	Fireman	TV series, 1 episode
1995	Eat My Shorts	Head	TV series
1995	Echo Point	Clive McInery	TV series, 6 episodes
1993; 1996	G.P.	Ron King / Colin Hodges	TV series, 2 episodes
1996	Home and Away	Keith Williams	TV series, 4 episodes
1997	Big Sky	Owner	TV series, 1 episode
1997	The Adventures of Sam	Voice	TV series, 2 episodes
1998	Children’s Hospital	Ray Reynolds	TV series, 1 episode
	Out and About	Presenter	TV series
	Australian Living	Presenter	TV series
	Australian Collections	Presenter	TV series
1998	Water Rats	Rob Jennings	TV series, 2 episodes
1998–2000	Search for Treasure Island	Paul Raymond	TV series, 8 episodes
1999	Railway Adventures Across Australia	Host	TV series
2000–2003	Better Homes and Gardens	DIY presenter	TV series
2002	All Saints	Steve Brooker	TV series, 1 episode
2002–2004	Room for Improvement	Host	TV series
2004	Down The Line with Scott McGregor	Host	TV series
2005	Australian Icon Towns	Host	TV series, 1 episode (History Channel)
2005–2006	Blue Water High	Harvey	TV series, 2 episodes
2008	The Stamp of Australia	Host	TV special (History Channel)

== Theatre ==
Year	Title	Role	Type
1979	The Three Sisters		Jane Street Theatre with NIDA
1979	Lower Depths		NIDA Theatre
1979	The Beggar’s Opera		NIDA Theatre, Playhouse, Canberra
1979	The Ballad of the Sad Café		NIDA Theatre
1980	Under Milk Wood		Playhouse, Perth
1980	Loot	Hal	Playhouse, Perth
1982	Saturday Sunday Monday	Rocco, the younger son	SGIO Theatre, Brisbane with Queensland Theatre
1982	The Tempest	Ferdinand	Albert Park Amphitheatre, Brisbane with Queensland Theatre
1984	Stage Struck		Marian Street Theatre with Australian Elizabethan Theatre Trust
1985; 1986	Bouncers	Walter	Seymour Centre, Universal Theatre, Melbourne
1986	The Secret Diary of Adrian Mole, Aged 13¾		Melbourne Athenaeum
1987	Tartuffe		Seymour Centre with Nimrod Theatre Company
1987	The Winter's Tale		Seymour Centre with Nimrod Theatre Company
1987	The Golden Age		Seymour Centre with Nimrod Theatre Company
1987	Les Liaisons Dangereuses		Seymour Centre with Nimrod Theatre Company
1988	Faces in the Street		Seymour Centre for Sydney Festival
1988	Drums of Thunder		Belvoir Street Theatre
1996	Down an Alley Filled With Cats		Marian Street Theatre for Sydney Festival
