= Terrain (film) =

- Written by: Terry Kyle
- Directed by: Terry Kyle
- Starring: Jonathan Hardy; Amanda Mires; Gerowyn Lacaze
- Music by: Craig Hanicek
- Country of origin: Australia
- Original language: English

Production
- Executive producers: Peter Gregory, Terry Kyle
- Producers: Peter Gregory, Terry Kyle, Jon Silver
- Running time: 88 minutes
- Production company: Archipelago Films

Original release
- Release: 1994

Terrain is a 1994 Australian film directed by Terry Kyle and starring Jonathan Hardy, Amande Mires, and Gerowyn Lacaze. It is set on a remote planet, and is about the crew of the research station Orpheus.

== Cast ==
- Jonathan Hardy as Giles Ballard
- Amanda Mires as Aria Iliarsky
- Gerowyn Lacaze as Sagan Lear
- Daniel Kealy as Roth Joyner
- Sally Ryan as Cal Manderson
- Marc James
- Lisa Ridgley
