= Anna Home =

English television producer and executive

Anna Home OBE
- Born: Anna Margaret Home; 13 January 1938 (age 88)
- Education: University of Oxford
- Occupations: Television executive and producer

Anna Margaret Home OBE (/ˈhjuːm/ HYOOM; born 13 January 1938) is an English television producer and executive who worked for most of her career at the BBC.

== Early career ==
After graduating from Oxford University, where she read Modern History at St Anne's College from 1956, Home joined the BBC in 1960. Initially working as a studio manager in BBC Radio, Home joined BBC Television in 1964 as a researcher for Play School. "At the time it was quite an achievement [for a woman] to get into university, not just the BBC", observed Home in 2013.

With Joy Whitby and Molly Cox, Home developed Jackanory, which began its long run in 1965. "At first people were unwilling to participate in this unknown programme", Home recalled in 1997. "But when actors realised it was the opportunity to have 15 minutes' solo experience on television, they began to queue up to get on it, and having done a Jackanory became a bit like having done your Desert Island Discs." Comedy actor Kenneth Williams, one of the most frequent participants in the series, recalled Home telling him: "Never sound as if you're patronizing the young."

Committed to children's drama output, Home revived domestically produced children's drama after a period in which the idiom had been dormant on the BBC's television channels. She was involved in the direction of such children's serials as Mandog (1972), adapted by Peter Dickinson from his own novel, because budgets did not allow her to contract more experienced people. The Changes (1975, made in 1973), a serial produced and adapted by Home from another Dickinson novel followed. By 1975, she was exclusively an executive producer of children's drama, and in this role commissioned the long-running Grange Hill (1978–2008) which had been rejected by several ITV companies, including Yorkshire Television whose children's department was now headed by Joy Whitby, which had questioned why children should want to watch a drama about being at school. Grange Hill was initially a controversial series. "As the press launched into us and No 10 was complaining loudly to the DG," Home recalled, "the Department of Health became very interested – after all we were tackling just the issues they were concerned with, but better than they could."

== Later career ==
For the 1982 ITV franchise round, she was a member of the consortium which became Television South (TVS) and replaced Southern Television. After a period at TVS as programme controller (and head of the children's and youth department) between 1981 and 1986, she returned to the BBC as head of the children's television department, responsible for about 900 hours of programming per year. Home cancelled Play School in 1988 considering it "dated"; this decision received some flak at the time. Home retired from her post at the BBC in 1997; the last series she commissioned was Teletubbies.

Home is the Chief Executive of the Children’s Film and Television Foundation, and chair of Save Kids' TV. In these roles she has become a campaigner for the retention of children's programmes on the BBC's main channels. Her book Into the Box of Delights (1993), a history of children's television, was conceived with this theme in mind. In 2009, she commented: "Teletubbies just would not get commissioned now. Children's dramas and shows are just too expensive. Children need to see programmes which reflect their life and they are no longer experiencing this. As a result, children are losing their identities."

== Honours ==
She won the Eleanor Farjeon Award in 1989, was awarded an OBE in 1993 and received the BAFTA Special Award in 1996. The same year she received the Women in Film and Television Lifetime Achievement Award.

Preceded by Edward Barnes	Head of BBC Children's Programmes; 1986–97	Succeeded by Lorraine Heggessey
