= Moonwind =

1986 science fiction novel by Louise Lawrence

- US first edition cover (publ. Harper & Row)
- Author: Louise Lawrence
- Publisher: Harper & Row
- Publication date: October 1, 1986

Moonwind is a 1986 science fiction novel by English author Louise Lawrence about two teenagers winning a trip to the Moon. One of them, Gareth, a rebellious Welsh child, falls in love with an alien, Bethkahn, after the two meet on a couple of brief encounters.
