= Room for Improvement (TV series) =

Australian television series

Room for Improvement is an Australian lifestyle television series aired on the Seven Network from 2000 until 2003. It was hosted by Scott McGregor and later Tom Williams. It also featured presenters Kate Ryerson, Alex Zaharov-Reutt, Craig Russell, Rob Palmer and Sophie Ward. Series One and Series Two were directed by Helen Parker.

This premise of the series is that homeowners receive a surprise makeover to a room in their house while they are away.

== See also ==
- Backyard Blitz
- Changing Rooms
- Aussie Property Flippers
