= The Diary of a Madman (opera) =

1958 opera by Humphrey Searle

The Diary of a Madman is a one-act chamber opera by the composer Humphrey Searle, who also wrote the libretto based on the eponymous short story by Nikolai Gogol. The opera was premiered in 1958 in Berlin.

== Background ==
The work, which is the first of Searle's operas, was commissioned by Hermann Scherchen, then the director of the Berlin Festival. Scherchen gave Searle complete choice of subject, stipulating only that the orchestra be of no more than 15 players, and that there should be no more than four singing roles. Searle had recently written incidental music for a radio production of Gogol's story, starring Paul Scofield, and decided to choose the story for his opera, providing completely new music.

The libretto was written by the composer, based on the translation of Gogol's story by D. S. Mirsky. The opera is scored for an orchestra of single strings, woodwind, and brass, with two percussionists. An electronic tape is also specified to produce particular sound effects. The voices of two dogs are directed to be sung by the same performer, using a loudspeaker. The opera was written in London and Amalfi between April and June 1958, and was premiered at the Berlin Festival on 3 October 1958, with Scherchen conducting.

== Roles ==
Role	Voice type	Premiere cast, 3 October 1958 (Conductor: Hermann Scherchen)
Aksenti Ivanovitch Popristchin	tenor	
Chief of Office Section	baritone	
Master of a Lunatic Asylum	baritone	
Sophie	soprano	
Voices of two dogs, Madgie and Fido	soprano	
Silent roles: A girl; a footman; Teplov, a Gentleman of the Chamber; Department Director; Government clerks, madmen, asylum assistants; two small dogs (a poodle and a dachshund).

== Synopsis ==
The action takes place in St. Petersburg in 1833. The opera is in five continuous scenes, each corresponding to a date in the diary, which is projected onto the backcloth, and following the outline of Gogol's story. In Scene 1 ("October 3") we meet the feckless government clerk Popristchin, short of money and in love with Sophie, the daughter of his boss. His sanity is clearly in question as he overhears a conversation between Sophie's poodle and a dachshund belonging to a passing girl (highlighted, as in most of Popritschin's future delusions, by the accompaniment of prepared electronic effects on tape). Scene 2 ("October 4"), finds Popritschin reprimanded by his boss for his inefficiency, and for his hopeless dreams of Sophie. In Scene 3 ("October 5") the increasingly demented Popritschin seeks to retrieve the correspondence which he imagines to exist between the two dogs. He believes that he has found it and that it describes Sophie's forthcoming marriage to a Gentleman of the Chamber, and also contains some rude comments about Popritschin himself. Scene 4 is dated "43 April 2000 A. D." Popritschin is now suffering from delusions of grandeur and believes himself to be King Ferdinand VIII of Spain. Turning up to his office he creates chaos before the astonished Sophie. Scene 5, dated "Madrid, Martober 86", finds Popritschin incarcerated and taunted in a lunatic asylum.

== Reception and Performances ==
The New Opera Company gave the first British performance of the opera in 1960 at Sadler's Wells Theatre, London, when the role of Popritschin was taken by Alexander Young. A recording of this production made by the BBC, directed by Barbara Bray, won the radio critics prize at the UNESCO International Rostrum of Composers in the same year.

In 1967 the opera was conducted by Walter Susskind at the Aspen Festival in Colorado.
