= You're Only Young Twice (1971 TV series) =

You're Only Young Twice is a British television comedy aired in 1971. It was produced by Associated Television (ATV). Cast included Liam Redmond, Adrienne Corri, Peter Copley, George Woodbridge, Leslie Dwyer, Vic Wise, Carmen Munroe, Anthony Jackson, Walter Swash, and John Dolan. All six episodes are believed to have been lost. It should not be confused with the 1977-1981 series of the same name, which still exists in the archives.
