= Good Morning with Rosemary =

- Also known as: Good Morning!!!; Breakfast-a-Go-Go
- Genre: Children's morning show
- Presented by: Rosemary Eather; Warwick Rankin
- Country of origin: Australia
- Original language: English
- No. of seasons: 5

Production
- Running time: 60 minutes

Original release
- Network: Network Ten
- Release: 1967 – 1971

Good Morning with Rosemary, also known as Good Morning!!!, is an Australian morning variety program that aired on TEN-10 (now part of Network Ten), and was broadcast in New South Wales. It was one of Australian Television's first weekday breakfast/variety programs for children. The program was produced and presented live to air by Rosemary Eather. The two-hour show featured news and live animals. On one occasion an elephant, named "Star" apparently counter to plan, walked between the live-to-air news reader and the camera, then toward the exit doors, with Rosemary and others chasing after the animal.

Guest celebrities included John Banner, Lorne Greene and Col Joye and Judy Stone. "Let's Explore" was a recurring feature.

== Overview ==
The show aired Monday through Friday mornings from 7:00am to 9:00am. Rosemary won the Logie Award for Best Female Television Personality (NSW) in 1970 and a special award from her peers and colleagues as the most Outstanding On Air TV Personality in 1969.

During 1969, stagehand nineteen-year-old Peter Rowan was appointed to stage manage and support Rosemary on the floor in the automated studio from which Good Morning Rosemary was broadcast. Other staff were in the control room and newsreaders would intermittently enter the studio to provide brief news content for parents who were watching the show with their children. Warwick Rankin and Jeremy Cordeaux were two of those newsreaders.

Soon after beginning his appointment Peter Rowan presented Rosemary with a list of around 120 educational subjects that could be economically and relatively easily presented on the program while being of high interest to children. Rosemary, a qualified geography teacher, was impressed and delighted.

Station management appointed Peter co-producer of the program, and when not in the studio Peter gathered and organized content which Rosemary then presented on air.

After about nine months working with Rosemary, Peter moved on to work with the station's film unit.

Other content included cartoons, serials, music clips, news, pet information, science experiments and competitions and interviews with famous personalities. During school holidays, groups of children joined Rosemary in the studio for a wide range of activities.

In 1971, the program took the new name Breakfast-a-Go-Go, paralleling, for Sydney, Fredd Bear's Breakfast-A-Go-Go on the Melbourne sister station, ATV-0. Sue Smith took over as host and her new comedic sidekick, Witless Wonder (actor Ron Blanchard), replaced Warwick Rankin when Rankin moved to his own children's show, Commander Strongarm.
