= The Ed and Zed Show =

1970 British TV series

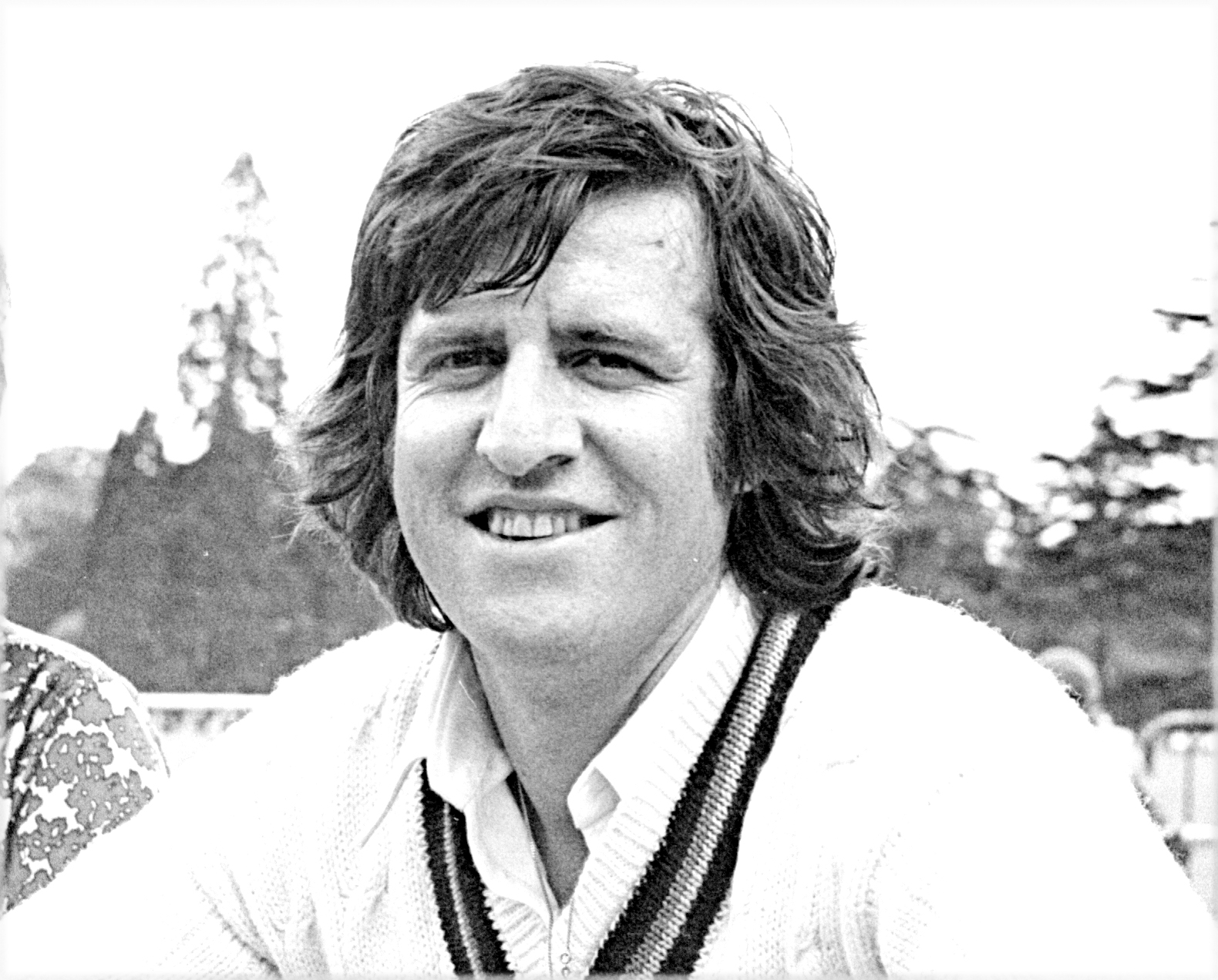
- The show's host Ed Stewart
- Genre: music
- Presented by: Ed Stewart
- No. of seasons: 1
- No. of episodes: 9

Production
- Producer: BBC

Original release
- Network: BBC
- Release: 24 October – 12 December 1970

The Ed and Zed Show is a BBC children's television programme which ran for nine episodes between October and December 1970. Episodes were aired on saturdays.

It was presented by the disc jockey Ed Stewart, nicknamed "Stewpot", and was co-hosted by Zed, the "rebel robot". Zed was often cheeky to the sometimes bad-tempered Stewart.

This programme is now of very minor significance, except for one point. While the theme of robots rebelling against their masters is a common one in culture, this is quite possibly the only case where the audience were supposed to be on the robot's side.

One feature of the robot was that at the end of every show except the last, he would overload himself by going into hysteric laughter causing smoke to billow out of his back.

The programme featured excerpts from The Wizard of Oz and the newest Walt Disney films as well as a weekly music guest, including early appearances by Mud and Hot Chocolate. Out of a total of nine episodes that were made, seven still exist (the lost editions are episodes 7 and 8).

== Episodes ==
Each episode had one musical act performing three songs and a video excerpt from a different artist.

- Episode 1 – White Plains – 24 October 1970

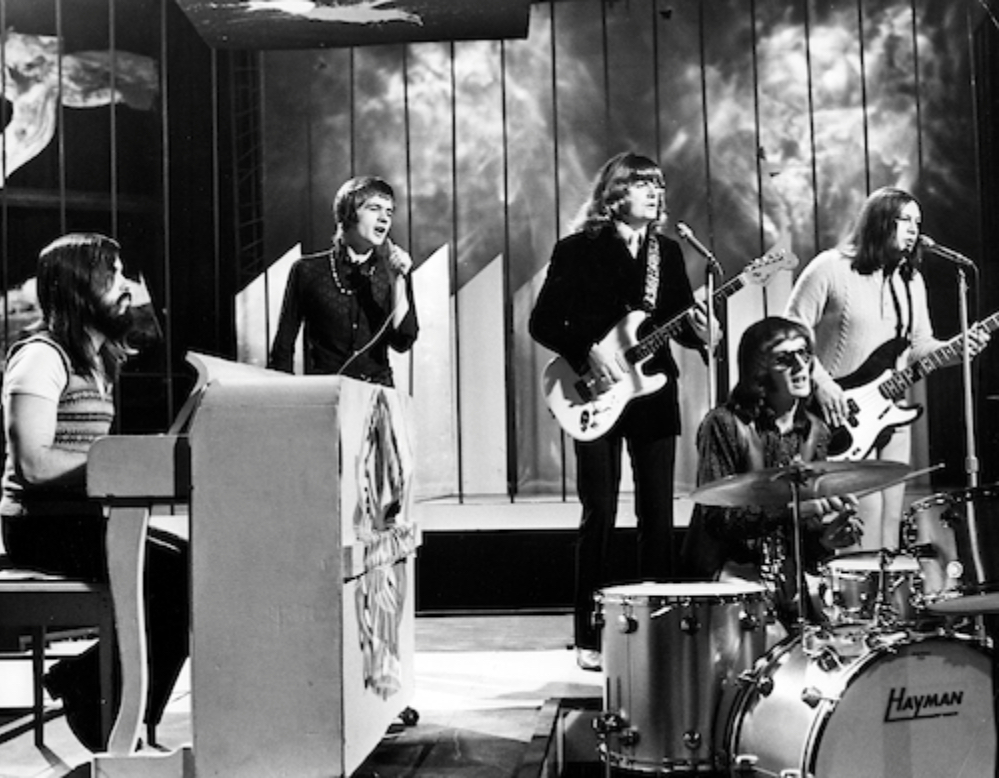
White Plains

1. "I've Got You On My Mind"
2. "Lovin' You Baby"
3. "My Baby Loves Lovin'"
4. Video excerpt: Jimmy Jones – "Good Timin'"
- Episode 2 – Hot Chocolate – 31 October 1970
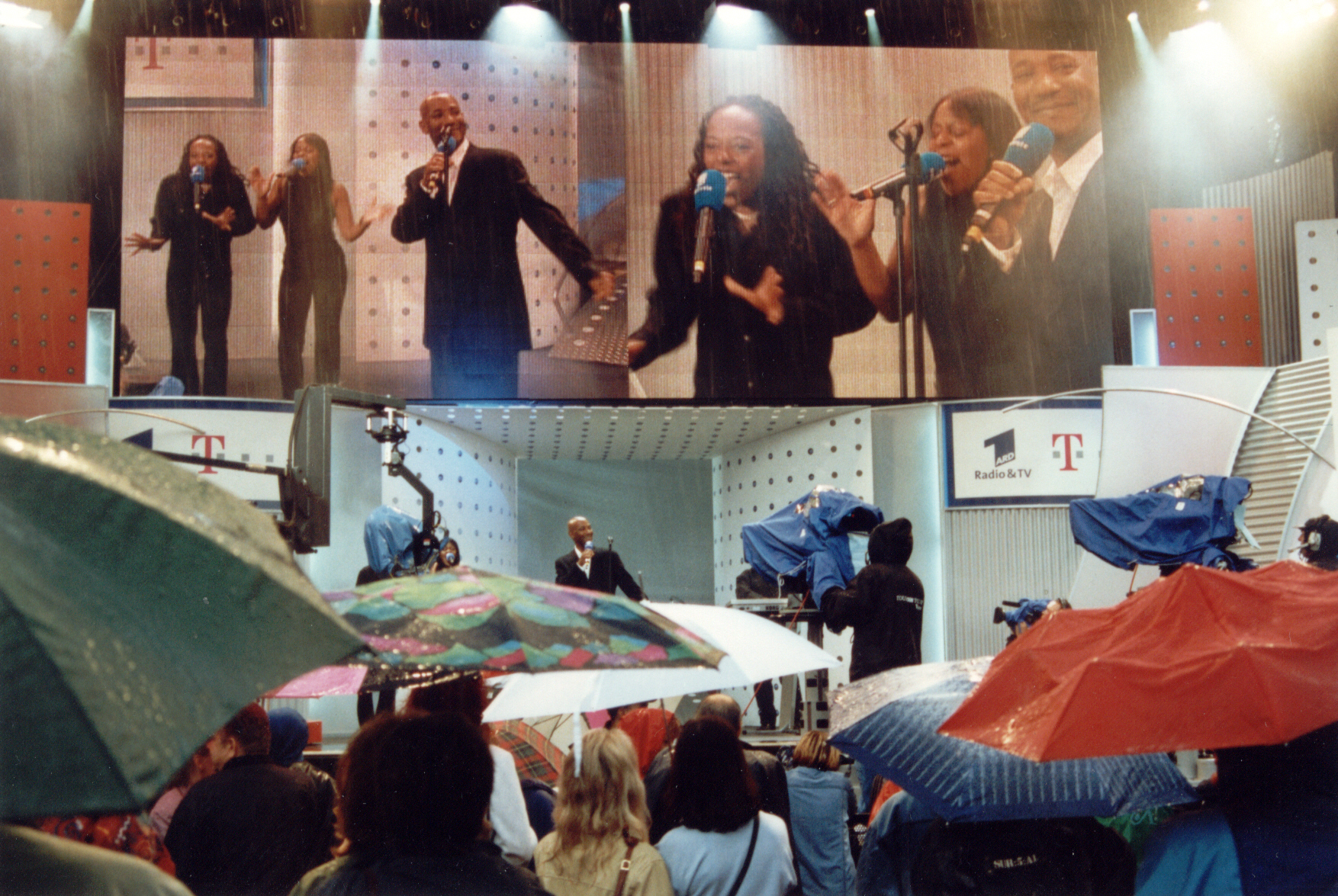
  Hot Chocolate
1. "Bet Yer Life I Do"
2. "Love Is Life"
3. "Money Don't Make A Man"
4. Video excerpt: Judas Jump – "This Feeling We Feel"
- Episode 3 – Mud – 7 November 1970
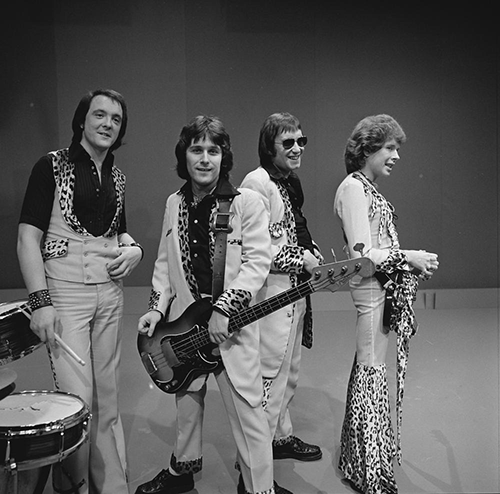
  Mud
1. "Love Grows (Where My Rosemary Goes)"
2. "Up Around the Bend"
3. "Jumping Jehosaphat"
4. Video excerpt: The Pipkins – "Gimme Dat Ding"
- Episode 4 – Sounds Incorporated – 14 November 1970
1. "Sgt. Pepper's Lonely Hearts Club Band"
2. "Maxwell's Silver Hammer"
3. "William Tell Overture"
4. Video excerpt: The Kinks – "Dedicated Follower of Fashion"
- Episode 5 – Wishful Thinking – 21 November 1970
1. "Sweets for My Sweet"
2. "Peanuts"
3. "United States Of Europe '79"
4. Video excerpt: Peter E. Bennett – "The Seagulls Name Was Nelson"
- Episode 6 – Vanity Fare – 28 November 1970
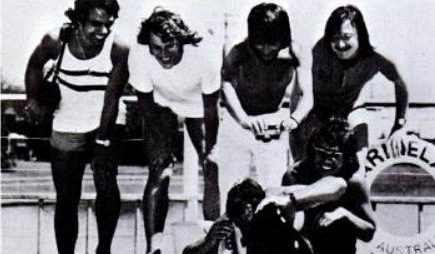
  Vanity Fare
1. "On Your Own"
2. "Carolina's Coming Home"
3. "Early in the Morning"
4. Video excerpt: Peter, Paul and Mary – "Leaving on a Jet Plane"
- Episode 7 – Gullivers People – 5 December 1970
1. It is unknown what songs Gullivers People sang on this edition, as it was wiped
- Episode 8 – The Freshmen – 12 December 1970
1. It is unknown what songs The Freshmen sang on this edition, as it was wiped
- Episode 9 – Herman's Hermits – 19 December 1970
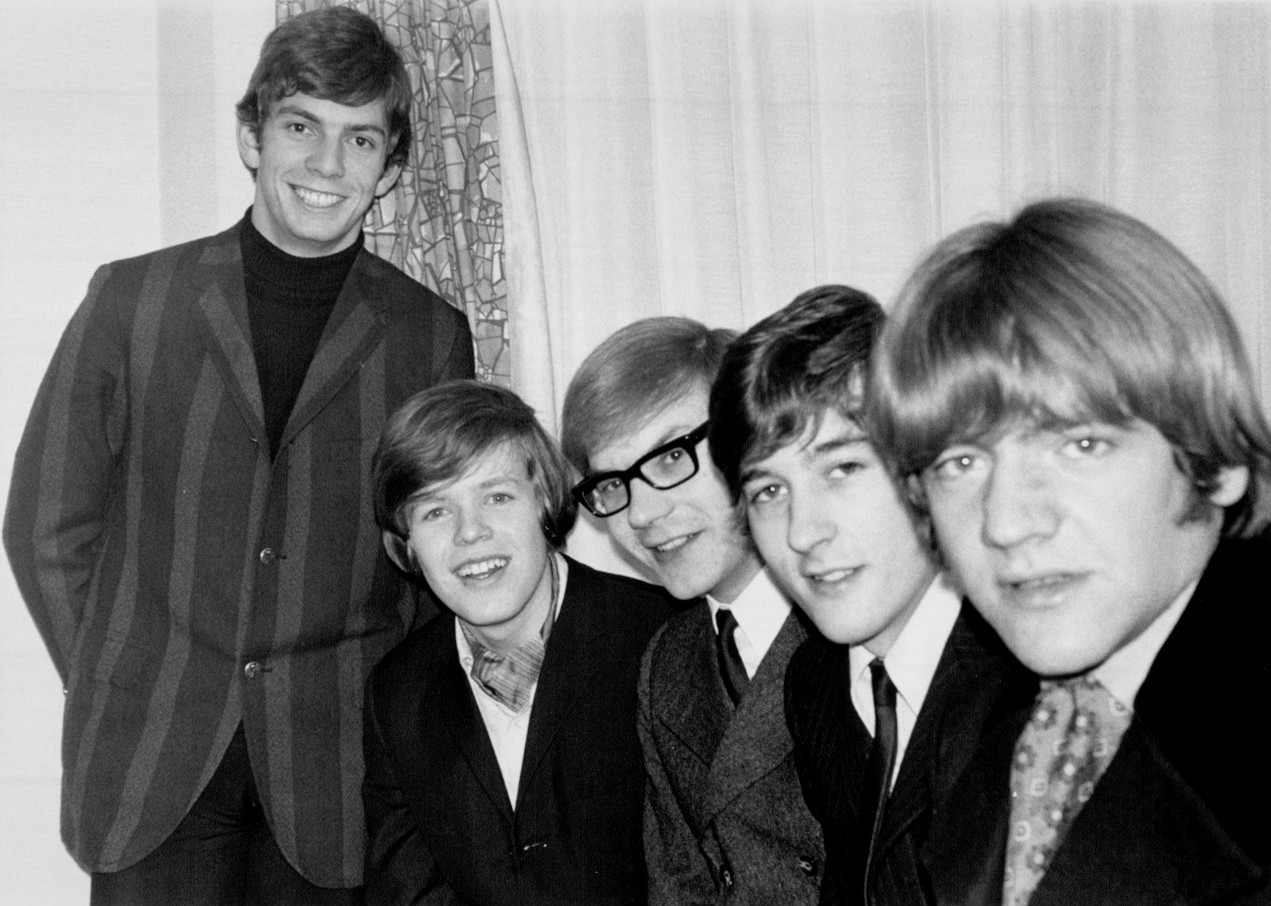
  Herman's Hermits
1. "I'm into Something Good"
2. "Lady Barbara"
3. "Sunshine Girl"
4. Video excerpt: unknown artist – "Ride Your Pony"

== See also ==
- List of fictional robots and androids
