= Louise Lawrence (author) =

English science fiction author

Elizabeth Holden (5 June 1943 – 6 December 2013), better known by her pen name Louise Lawrence, was an English science fiction author best known for her work published in the 1970s and 1980s. She has been classified as a writer for young adults. She died on 6 December 2013 of a heart attack in her home at Kiltimagh in Ireland, after suffering from heart problems a number of years earlier.

== Biography ==
Born Elizabeth Rhoda Holden on 5 June 1943 in Leatherhead, Surrey, to bricklayer Fred Holden and cook Rhoda Edith (née Cowles), she and her younger sister Catherine attended Poplar Road Primary School, Leatherhead, between 1948 and 1954. The family then moved to the Forest of Dean, where her mother had been born and grew up, and there Lawrence attended Lydney Grammar School between 1954 and 1961. Her first published poem, “The Moon”, appeared in the Lydney Grammar School magazine in 1958.

Between 1961 and 1963 she worked as a junior assistant at the Gloucestershire County Library, then left to marry Keith Wintle. She had three children with her first husband, and at this point began to write, in part as an escape from being "totally isolated socially and environmentally in a remote farmhouse, with a husband who had no time for me", as she later put it. She resumed local library assistant work in 1969, and wrote four ("very bad" by her own estimation) unpublished novels before Andra, her first published novel. She then left her husband and set out on a career as a professional writer. Andra was serialised in 1976 by ABC for Australian TV.

She married Graham Mace in 1987. In 1998 they moved to County Mayo in Ireland, where Lawrence continued to be active in writers' circles and festivals. She died in 2013.

== Books ==
- Andra (1971)
- The Power of Stars (1972)
- The Wyndcliffe (1974)
- Sing and Scatter the Daisies (1977)
- Star Lord (1978)
- Cat Call (1980)
- The Earth Witch (1981)
- Calling B for Butterfly (1982)
- The Dram Road (1983)
- Children of the Dust (1985)
- Moonwind (1986)
- The Warriors of Taan (1986)
- Extinction is Forever and Other Stories (1990)
- Keeper of the Universe (1992)
- The Disinherited (1994)
- The Llandor Trilogy:
  - The Journey Through Llandor (1995)
  - The Road to Irriyan (1996)
  - The Shadow of Mordican (1996)
- Dream-weaver (1996)
- The Crowlings (1999)
- The Witch and the Weather Mage (2013)
