= Andra (novel) =

1971 science fiction novel by Louise Lawrence

- First edition
- Author: Louise Lawrence
- Language: English
- Publisher: Collins
- Publication date: 1971

Andra is a 1971 science fiction novel, the first novel by English writer Louise Lawrence.

In 1976 it was made into a children's television program by ABC Television.

== Plot ==
The book was set 2000 years from now, after the world was destroyed by war leaving the earth knocked off its rotation and the ground above to become a desolate frozen wasteland with everyone that survived living below the ground in underground cities.

The main story revolves around Andra, a teenage girl who has a terrible accident and has to have a brain graft operation to survive. However, the only donor available was a young man that lived and died in 1987. After the operation her life is totally changed; she becomes a rebel, fighting against the rigid laws that rule society underground in Sub City One and the totalitarian authority that rules over life and death of any individual.
